= List of solar eclipses visible from the United States =

From 1900 to 2100, the United States of America (excluding its global territories) will have recorded a total of 182 solar eclipses, 21 of which are annular eclipses, 26 of which are total eclipses, and one of which is a hybrid eclipse. As of August 2026, the most recent total solar eclipse in the United States occurred on April 8, 2024; the most recent annular solar eclipse was on October 14, 2023; and the most recent partial solar eclipse occurred on August 12, 2026. The next total solar eclipse in the United States will occur on March 30, 2033 (in Alaska only), whereas the next total solar eclipse in the contiguous United States will occur on August 22, 2044 (local time). The next annular solar eclipse will occur on June 21, 2039 (in Alaska only), whereas the next annular solar eclipse in the contiguous United States will occur on February 5, 2046. The next partial solar eclipse in the United States will occur on January 26, 2028.

The events below include all eclipses whose path of totality or annularity passes through the land territory of the current fifty U.S. states and the District of Columbia. All types of solar eclipses, whether recent, upcoming, or in the past, are also included. For lists of eclipses worldwide, see the list of 20th-century solar eclipses and 21st-century solar eclipses.

== Key ==
For each event in a particular state, the date is followed by a small uppercase letter in parentheses, indicating the type of solar eclipse that passed over that state.

- (P) -- partial solar eclipse
- (A) -- annular solar eclipse
- (T) -- total solar eclipse
- (H) -- hybrid solar eclipse
- † -- only a sliver of the state was in the path of totality, annularity, or partiality

== Alabama ==
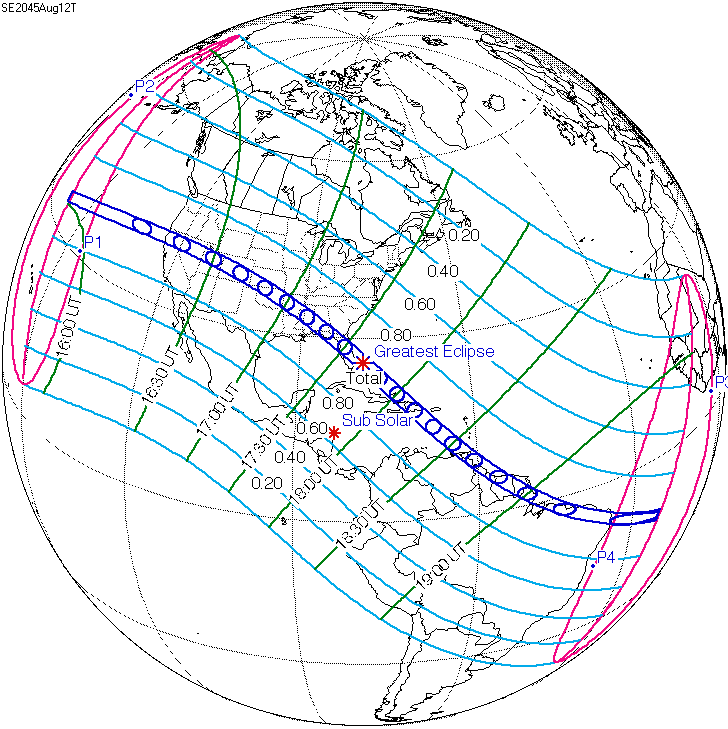
The path of the next total solar eclipse to cross Alabama on August 12, 2045

From 1900 to 2100, the state of Alabama will have recorded a total of 87 solar eclipses, two of which are annular eclipses and four of which are total eclipses. The two annular solar eclipses occurred on April 7, 1940, and May 30, 1984, respectively. One total solar eclipse occurred on June 8, 1918, and three more will occur on August 12, 2045; March 30, 2052; and May 11, 2078.

The most recent total solar eclipse in Alabama was on June 8, 1918; the most recent annular solar eclipse was on May 30, 1984; and the most recent partial solar eclipse was on April 8, 2024. The next total solar eclipse in Alabama will occur on August 12, 2045, and the next partial solar eclipse will occur on January 26, 2028.

- August 30, 1905 (P)
- January 3, 1908 (P)
- June 28, 1908 (P)
- June 17, 1909 (P)
- April 28, 1911 (P)
- April 17, 1912 (P)
- October 10, 1912 (P)
- February 3, 1916 (P)
- June 8, 1918 (T)
- November 22, 1919 (P)
- November 10, 1920 (P)
- March 28, 1922 (P) †
- September 10, 1923 (P)
- January 24, 1925 (P)
- July 9, 1926 (P)
- April 28, 1930 (P)
- August 31, 1932 (P)
- February 3, 1935 (P)
- June 8, 1937 (P) †
- April 19, 1939 (P)
- April 7, 1940 (A)
- January 25, 1944 (P)
- July 9, 1945 (P)
- November 23, 1946 (P)
- November 12, 1947 (P)
- March 7, 1951 (P)
- September 1, 1951 (P)
- June 30, 1954 (P)
- October 2, 1959 (P)
- September 20, 1960 (P)
- July 31, 1962 (P)
- July 20, 1963 (P)
- November 12, 1966 (P) †
- May 9, 1967 (P)
- September 11, 1969 (P)
- March 7, 1970 (P)
- July 10, 1972 (P)
- December 24, 1973 (P)
- December 13, 1974 (P)
- October 12, 1977 (P)
- February 26, 1979 (P)
- August 10, 1980 (P)
- May 30, 1984 (A)
- October 3, 1986 (P)
- July 11, 1991 (P)
- May 10, 1994 (P)
- February 26, 1998 (P)
- December 25, 2000 (P)
- December 14, 2001 (P)
- June 10, 2002 (P)
- April 8, 2005 (P)
- May 20, 2012 (P)
- November 3, 2013 (P)
- October 23, 2014 (P)
- August 21, 2017 (P)
- October 14, 2023 (P)
- April 8, 2024 (P)
- → January 26, 2028 (P)
- January 14, 2029 (P)
- November 14, 2031 (P)
- March 30, 2033 (P)
- January 5, 2038 (P)
- July 2, 2038 (P)
- November 4, 2040 (P)
- August 12, 2045 (T)
- June 11, 2048 (P)
- May 31, 2049 (P) †
- March 30, 2052 (T)
- January 27, 2055 (P)
- January 16, 2056 (P)
- July 12, 2056 (P)
- July 1, 2057 (P)
- June 22, 2066 (P)
- June 11, 2067 (P)
- December 6, 2067 (P)
- November 24, 2068 (P)
- September 23, 2071 (P)
- November 15, 2077 (P)
- May 11, 2078 (T)
- February 27, 2082 (P)
- February 16, 2083 (P)
- September 23, 2090 (P)
- February 7, 2092 (P)
- July 23, 2093 (P)
- December 7, 2094 (P)
- September 14, 2099 (P)
- March 10, 2100 (P)

== Alaska ==
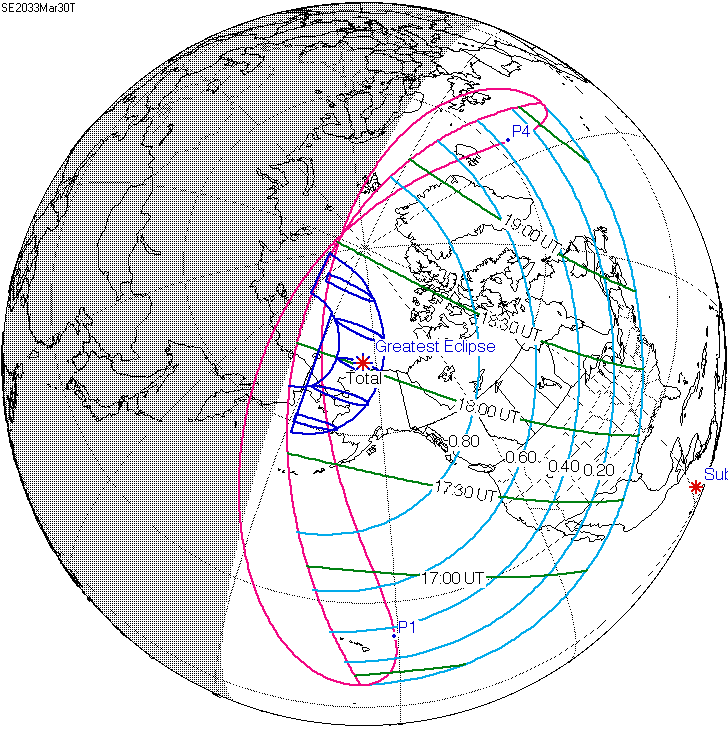
The path of the next total solar eclipse to cross Alaska on March 30, 2033

From 1900 to 2100, the state of Alaska will have recorded a total of 127 solar eclipses, six of which are annular eclipses and eight of which are total eclipses. Two of the annular eclipses have already occurred on April 19, 1939 and May 9, 1948, respectively, and four more will occur on June 21, 2039; July 1, 2057; June 22, 2066; and July 3, 2084. Six total solar eclipses have already occurred on June 29, 1927; February 4, 1943; September 12, 1950; July 20, 1963; July 10, 1972; and July 22, 1990, respectively, and two more will occur on March 30, 2033, and May 11, 2097.

The most recent total solar eclipse in Alaska was on July 22, 1990; the most recent annular solar eclipse was on May 9, 1948; and the most recent partial solar eclipse was on August 12, 2026. The next total solar eclipse in Alaska will occur on March 30, 2033; the next annular solar eclipse will occur on June 21, 2039; and the next partial solar eclipse will occur on January 14, 2029.

- April 8, 1902 (P)
- March 29, 1903 (P)
- August 20, 1906 (P)
- June 17, 1909 (P)
- November 2, 1910 (P)
- April 6, 1913 (P)
- August 10, 1915 (P)
- June 19, 1917 (P)
- June 8, 1918 (P)
- September 10, 1923 (P)
- July 9, 1926 (P)
- June 29, 1927 (T) †
- April 28, 1930 (P)
- September 12, 1931 (P)
- August 31, 1932 (P)
- February 14, 1934 (P)
- February 3, 1935 (P)
- June 19, 1936 (P)
- December 2, 1937 (P)
- November 21, 1938 (P)
- April 19, 1939 (A)
- April 7, 1940 (P)
- September 21, 1941 (P)
- September 10, 1942 (P)
- February 4, 1943 (T)
- July 9, 1945 (P)
- November 23, 1946 (P)
- November 12, 1947 (P)
- May 9, 1948 (A)
- September 12, 1950 (T) †
- February 14, 1953 (P)
- July 11, 1953 (P)
- June 30, 1954 (P)
- April 30, 1957 (P)
- April 19, 1958 (P)
- September 20, 1960 (P)
- February 5, 1962 (P) †
- July 20, 1963 (T)
- July 9, 1964 (P)
- December 4, 1964 (P)
- May 9, 1967 (P)
- September 11, 1969 (P)
- March 7, 1970 (P)
- July 22, 1971 (P)
- July 10, 1972 (T)
- May 11, 1975 (P)
- October 12, 1977 (P)
- February 26, 1979 (P)
- July 31, 1981 (P)
- July 20, 1982 (P)
- May 30, 1984 (P)
- May 19, 1985 (P)
- October 3, 1986 (P)
- March 18, 1988 (P)
- March 7, 1989 (P)
- July 22, 1990 (T)
- July 11, 1991 (P)
- January 4, 1992 (P)
- December 24, 1992 (P)
- May 21, 1993 (P)
- May 10, 1994 (P)
- March 9, 1997 (P)
- July 31, 2000 (P)
- December 25, 2000 (P) †
- December 14, 2001 (P)
- June 10, 2002 (P)
- May 31, 2003 (P)
- October 14, 2004 (P)
- March 19, 2007 (P)
- August 1, 2008 (P)
- June 1, 2011 (P)
- May 20, 2012 (P)
- October 23, 2014 (P)
- August 21, 2017 (P)
- January 6, 2019 (P)
- June 10, 2021 (P)
- October 14, 2023 (P)
- April 8, 2024 (P)
- August 12, 2026 (P)
- → January 14, 2029 (P)
- June 12, 2029 (P)
- November 14, 2031 (P)
- March 30, 2033 (T)
- September 2, 2035 (P)
- August 21, 2036 (P)
- June 21, 2039 (A)
- November 4, 2040 (P)
- October 25, 2041 (P)
- April 20, 2042 (P)
- April 9, 2043 (P)
- August 22, 2044 (P)
- August 12, 2045 (P)
- February 5, 2046 (P)
- January 26, 2047 (P)
- June 23, 2047 (P)
- June 11, 2048 (P)
- April 11, 2051 (P)
- March 30, 2052 (P)
- September 2, 2054 (P)
- January 27, 2055 (P)
- January 16, 2056 (P)
- July 1, 2057 (A)
- November 16, 2058 (P)
- April 20, 2061 (P)
- August 24, 2063 (P)
- June 22, 2066 (A)
- November 24, 2068 (P)
- April 11, 2070 (P)
- September 23, 2071 (P)
- February 7, 2073 (P)
- July 13, 2075 (P)
- July 1, 2076 (P)
- November 15, 2077 (P)
- September 13, 2080 (P)
- February 16, 2083 (P)
- July 3, 2084 (A)
- May 2, 2087 (P)
- September 23, 2090 (P)
- July 23, 2093 (P)
- July 12, 2094 (P)
- December 7, 2094 (P)
- November 27, 2095 (P)
- May 22, 2096 (P)
- May 11, 2097 (T)
- September 25, 2098 (P)
- September 14, 2099 (P)
- March 10, 2100 (P)

== Arizona ==
An animation of the most recent annular solar eclipse to cross Arizona on October 14, 2023

From 1900 to 2100, the state of Arizona will have recorded a total of 91 solar eclipses, four of which are annular eclipses. Three annular solar eclipses already occurred on May 10, 1994; May 20, 2012; and October 14, 2023, and one more will occur on November 15, 2077.

The most recent annular solar eclipse was on October 14, 2023; and the most recent partial solar eclipse was on April 8, 2024. The next annular solar eclipse will occur on November 15, 2077; and the next partial solar eclipse will occur on January 26, 2028.

- January 3, 1908 (P)
- June 28, 1908 (P)
- June 17, 1909 (P)
- April 28, 1911 (P)
- February 3, 1916 (P)
- June 8, 1918 (P)
- November 22, 1919 (P)
- September 10, 1923 (P)
- January 24, 1925 (P)
- July 9, 1926 (P)
- April 28, 1930 (P)
- August 31, 1932 (P)
- February 3, 1935 (P)
- June 8, 1937 (P)
- December 2, 1937 (P)
- November 21, 1938 (P) †
- April 19, 1939 (P)
- April 7, 1940 (P)
- February 4, 1943 (P)
- January 25, 1944 (P)
- July 9, 1945 (P)
- November 23, 1946 (P)
- November 12, 1947 (P)
- March 7, 1951 (P)
- September 20, 1960 (P)
- February 5, 1962 (P)
- July 20, 1963 (P)
- May 30, 1965 (P) †
- May 9, 1967 (P)
- September 11, 1969 (P)
- March 7, 1970 (P)
- July 10, 1972 (P)
- December 24, 1973 (P)
- December 13, 1974 (P)
- October 12, 1977 (P)
- February 26, 1979 (P)
- August 10, 1980 (P)
- May 30, 1984 (P)
- October 3, 1986 (P)
- March 7, 1989 (P)
- July 11, 1991 (P)
- January 4, 1992 (P)
- May 21, 1993 (P)
- May 10, 1994 (A)
- February 26, 1998 (P)
- December 25, 2000 (P)
- December 14, 2001 (P)
- June 10, 2002 (P)
- April 8, 2005 (P)
- May 20, 2012 (A)
- October 23, 2014 (P)
- August 21, 2017 (P)
- October 14, 2023 (A)
- April 8, 2024 (P)
- → January 26, 2028 (P)
- January 14, 2029 (P)
- November 14, 2031 (P)
- March 30, 2033 (P)
- June 21, 2039 (P)
- November 4, 2040 (P)
- April 9, 2043 (P)
- August 22, 2044 (P)
- February 16, 2045 (P)
- August 12, 2045 (P)
- February 5, 2046 (P)
- June 11, 2048 (P)
- March 30, 2052 (P)
- September 2, 2054 (P)
- January 27, 2055 (P)
- January 16, 2056 (P)
- July 12, 2056 (P)
- July 1, 2057 (P)
- June 22, 2066 (P)
- June 11, 2067 (P)
- November 24, 2068 (P)
- September 23, 2071 (P)
- November 15, 2077 (A)
- May 11, 2078 (P)
- November 4, 2078 (P)
- February 27, 2082 (P)
- February 16, 2083 (P)
- July 3, 2084 (P)
- December 16, 2085 (P)
- February 7, 2092 (P)
- December 7, 2094 (P)
- May 22, 2096 (P)
- May 11, 2097 (P)
- September 25, 2098 (P)
- March 21, 2099 (P)
- September 14, 2099 (P)
- March 10, 2100 (P)

== Arkansas ==
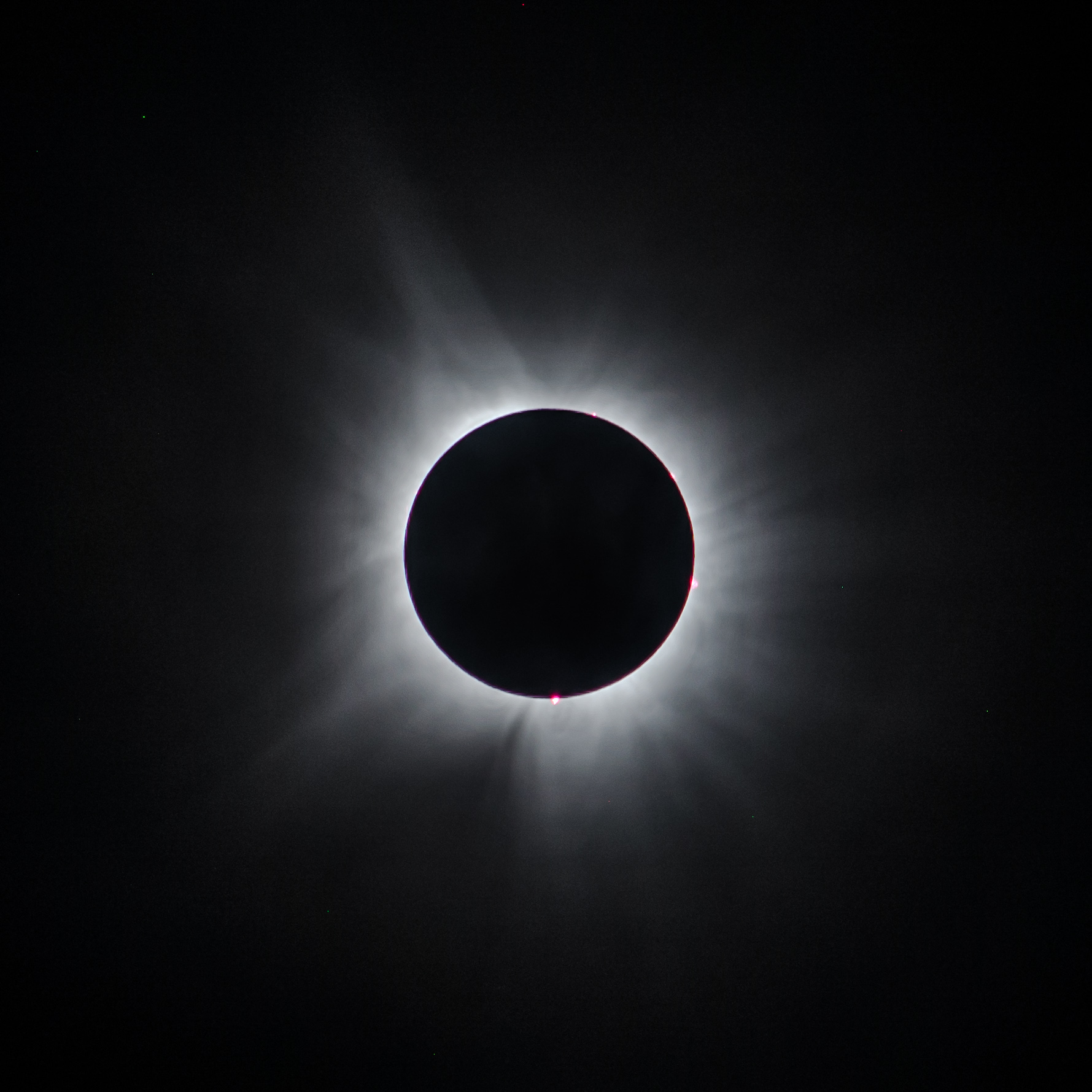
A view of the solar eclipse on April 8, 2024 from Russellville, Arkansas, during totality

From 1900 to 2100, the state of Arkansas will have recorded a total of 84 solar eclipses, three of which are total eclipses. Two total solar eclipses occurred on June 8, 1918 and April 8, 2024, respectively, and one more will occur on August 12, 2045.

The most recent total solar eclipse in Arkansas was on April 8, 2024, and the most recent partial solar eclipse was on October 14, 2023 (not counting April 8). The next total solar eclipse in Arkansas will occur on August 12, 2045, and the next partial solar eclipse will occur on January 26, 2028.

- August 30, 1905 (P)
- January 3, 1908 (P)
- June 28, 1908 (P)
- June 17, 1909 (P)
- April 28, 1911 (P)
- April 17, 1912 (P)
- October 10, 1912 (P)
- February 3, 1916 (P)
- June 8, 1918 (T)
- November 22, 1919 (P)
- November 10, 1920 (P)
- September 10, 1923 (P)
- January 24, 1925 (P)
- July 9, 1926 (P)
- April 28, 1930 (P)
- August 31, 1932 (P)
- February 3, 1935 (P)
- April 19, 1939 (P)
- April 7, 1940 (P)
- January 25, 1944 (P) †
- July 9, 1945 (P)
- November 23, 1946 (P)
- November 12, 1947 (P)
- March 7, 1951 (P)
- September 1, 1951 (P)
- June 30, 1954 (P)
- September 20, 1960 (P)
- July 20, 1963 (P)
- May 9, 1967 (P)
- September 11, 1969 (P)
- March 7, 1970 (P)
- July 10, 1972 (P)
- December 24, 1973 (P)
- December 13, 1974 (P)
- October 12, 1977 (P)
- February 26, 1979 (P)
- August 10, 1980 (P) †
- May 30, 1984 (P)
- October 3, 1986 (P)
- March 7, 1989 (P) †
- July 11, 1991 (P)
- May 21, 1993 (P) †
- May 10, 1994 (P)
- February 26, 1998 (P)
- December 25, 2000 (P)
- December 14, 2001 (P)
- June 10, 2002 (P)
- April 8, 2005 (P)
- May 20, 2012 (P)
- October 23, 2014 (P)
- August 21, 2017 (P)
- October 14, 2023 (P)
- April 8, 2024 (T)
- → January 26, 2028 (P)
- January 14, 2029 (P)
- November 14, 2031 (P)
- March 30, 2033 (P)
- January 5, 2038 (P)
- July 2, 2038 (P)
- June 21, 2039 (P)
- November 4, 2040 (P)
- August 12, 2045 (T)
- June 11, 2048 (P)
- March 30, 2052 (P)
- January 27, 2055 (P)
- January 16, 2056 (P)
- July 12, 2056 (P)
- July 1, 2057 (P)
- June 22, 2066 (P)
- June 11, 2067 (P)
- December 6, 2067 (P)
- November 24, 2068 (P)
- September 23, 2071 (P)
- November 15, 2077 (P)
- May 11, 2078 (P)
- February 27, 2082 (P)
- February 16, 2083 (P)
- September 23, 2090 (P)
- February 7, 2092 (P)
- July 23, 2093 (P)
- December 7, 2094 (P)
- March 21, 2099 (P)
- September 14, 2099 (P)
- March 10, 2100 (P)

== California ==
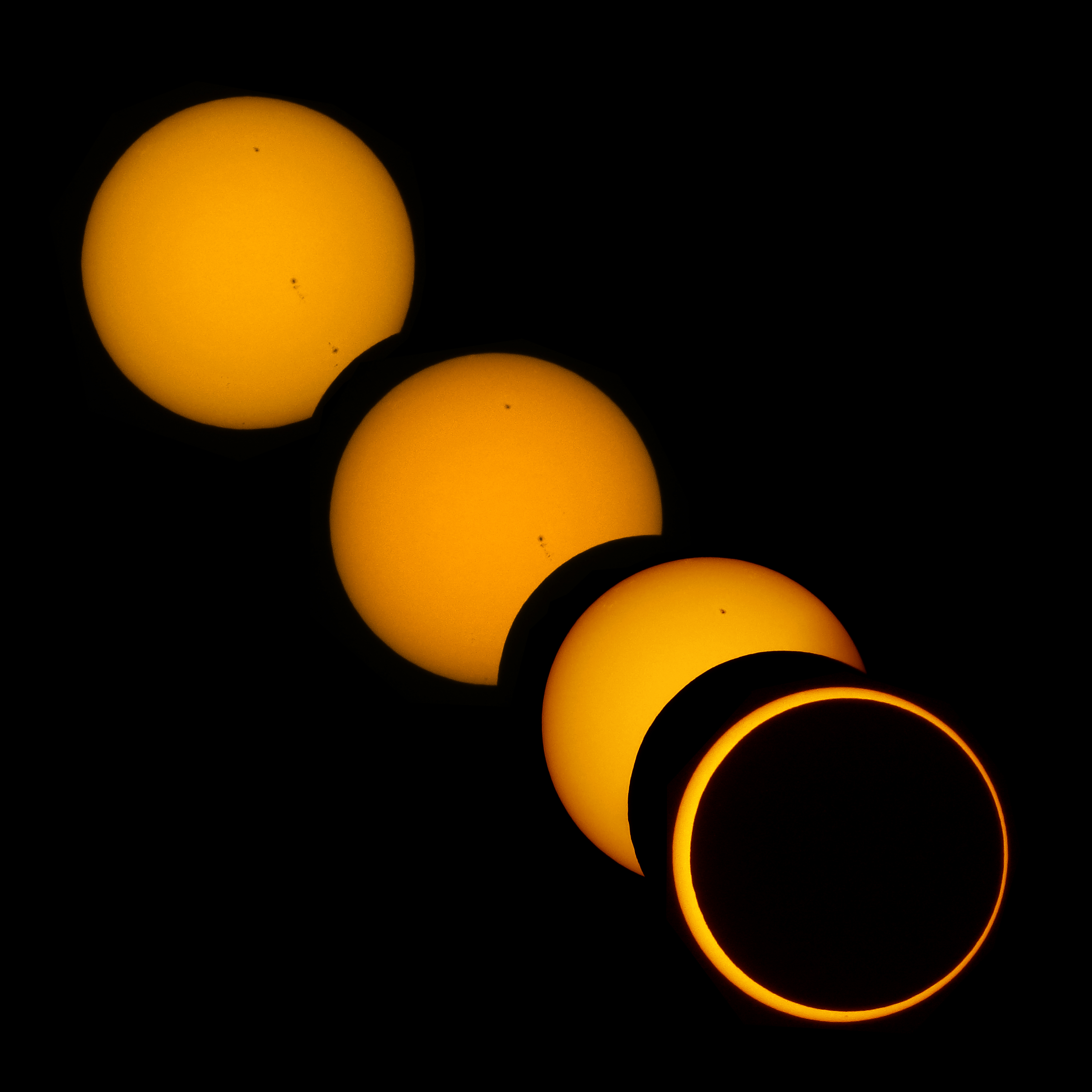
A composite series of images from the May 20, 2012 annular solar eclipse in Red Bluff, California

From 1900 to 2100, the state of California will have recorded a total of 97 solar eclipses, seven of which are annular eclipses, two of which are total eclipses, and one of which is a hybrid eclipse. Three annular solar eclipses have already occurred on January 4, 1992; May 20, 2012; and October 14, 2023, respectively, and four more will occur on February 5, 2046; November 15, 2077; July 3, 2084; and March 10, 2100. One total solar eclipse occurred on September 10, 1923, and the other will occur on August 12, 2045. The lone hybrid eclipse, of which its total eclipse portion passed over California, occurred on April 28, 1930.

The most recent total solar eclipse in California was on September 10, 1923; the most recent annular solar eclipse was on October 14, 2023; and the most recent partial solar eclipse was on April 8, 2024. The next total solar eclipse in California will occur on August 12, 2045; the next annular solar eclipse will occur on February 5, 2046; and the next partial solar eclipse will occur on January 26, 2028.

- January 3, 1908 (P) †
- June 28, 1908 (P)
- June 17, 1909 (P)
- April 28, 1911 (P)
- April 6, 1913 (P)
- February 3, 1916 (P)
- June 8, 1918 (P)
- November 22, 1919 (P)
- September 10, 1923 (T)
- July 9, 1926 (P)
- April 28, 1930 (H)
- August 31, 1932 (P)
- February 14, 1934 (P)
- February 3, 1935 (P)
- June 8, 1937 (P)
- December 2, 1937 (P)
- November 21, 1938 (P)
- April 19, 1939 (P)
- April 7, 1940 (P)
- February 4, 1943 (P)
- July 9, 1945 (P)
- November 23, 1946 (P)
- November 12, 1947 (P)
- May 9, 1948 (P)
- March 7, 1951 (P)
- April 30, 1957 (P) †
- September 20, 1960 (P)
- February 5, 1962 (P)
- July 20, 1963 (P)
- May 9, 1967 (P)
- September 11, 1969 (P)
- March 7, 1970 (P)
- July 10, 1972 (P)
- December 13, 1974 (P)
- October 12, 1977 (P)
- February 26, 1979 (P)
- August 10, 1980 (P)
- May 30, 1984 (P)
- October 3, 1986 (P) †
- March 7, 1989 (P)
- July 22, 1990 (P)
- July 11, 1991 (P)
- January 4, 1992 (A)
- May 21, 1993 (P)
- May 10, 1994 (P)
- February 26, 1998 (P) †
- July 31, 2000 (P)
- December 25, 2000 (P)
- December 14, 2001 (P)
- June 10, 2002 (P)
- April 8, 2005 (P)
- May 20, 2012 (A)
- October 23, 2014 (P)
- August 21, 2017 (P)
- October 14, 2023 (A)
- April 8, 2024 (P)
- → January 26, 2028 (P)
- January 14, 2029 (P)
- November 14, 2031 (P)
- March 30, 2033 (P)
- September 2, 2035 (P)
- June 21, 2039 (P)
- November 4, 2040 (P)
- April 20, 2042 (P) †
- April 9, 2043 (P)
- August 22, 2044 (P)
- February 16, 2045 (P)
- August 12, 2045 (T)
- February 5, 2046 (A)
- June 11, 2048 (P)
- March 30, 2052 (P)
- September 2, 2054 (P)
- January 27, 2055 (P)
- January 16, 2056 (P)
- July 12, 2056 (P)
- July 1, 2057 (P)
- June 22, 2066 (P)
- June 11, 2067 (P)
- November 24, 2068 (P)
- September 23, 2071 (P)
- November 15, 2077 (A) †
- May 11, 2078 (P)
- November 4, 2078 (P)
- February 27, 2082 (P) †
- February 16, 2083 (P)
- July 3, 2084 (A)
- December 16, 2085 (P)
- May 2, 2087 (P)
- September 23, 2090 (P)
- February 7, 2092 (P)
- December 7, 2094 (P)
- May 22, 2096 (P)
- May 11, 2097 (P)
- September 25, 2098 (P)
- March 21, 2099 (P)
- September 14, 2099 (P)
- March 10, 2100 (A)

== Colorado ==
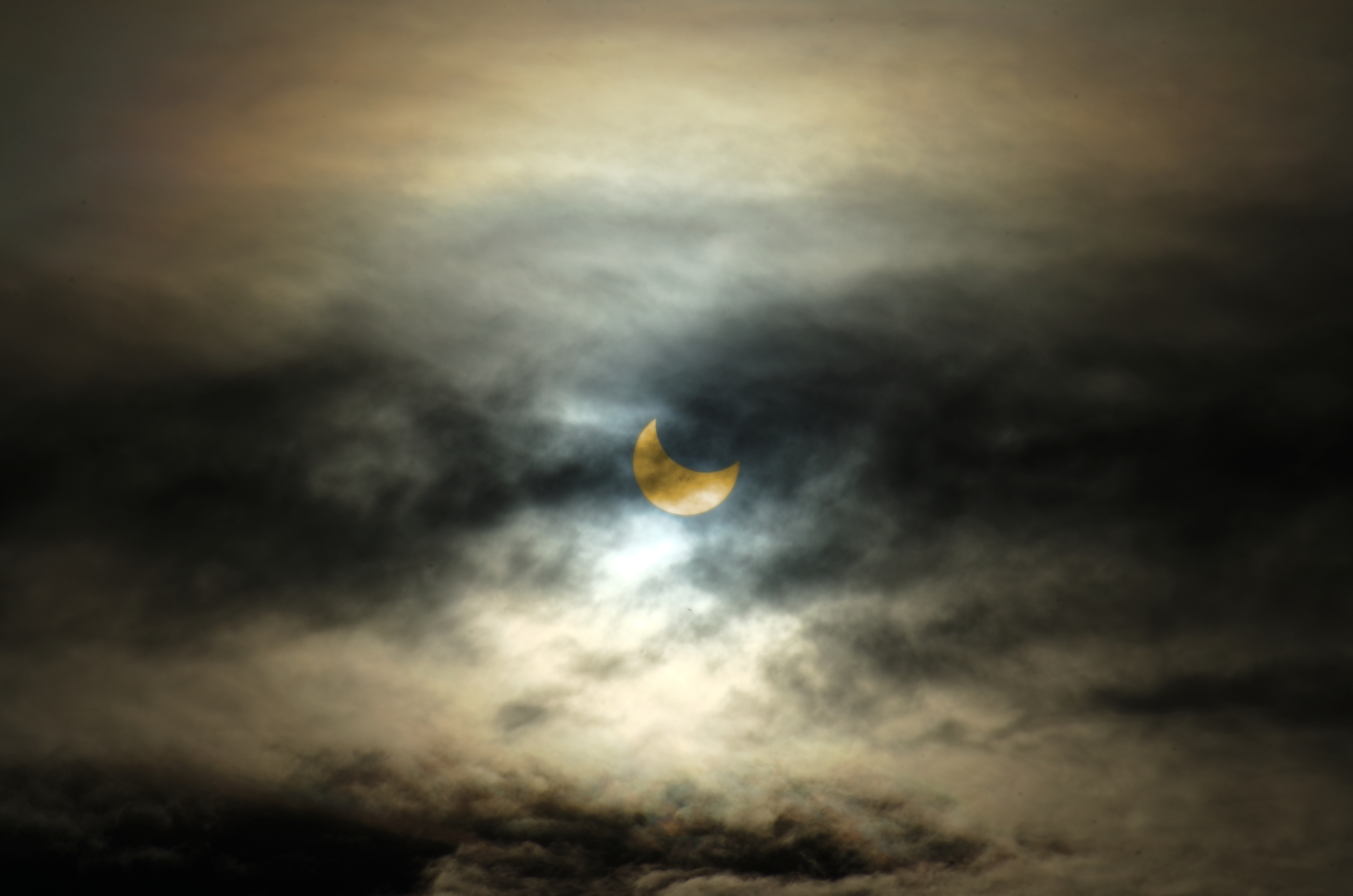
A view of the solar eclipse on October 23, 2014 from Denver, Colorado, during its partial phase

From 1900 to 2100, the state of Colorado will have recorded a total of 93 solar eclipses, four of which are annular eclipses and two of which are total eclipses. Two of the annular solar eclipses have already occurred on May 20, 2012 and October 14, 2023, respectively, and two more will occur on June 11, 2048 and November 15, 2077. One total solar eclipse occurred on June 8, 1918, and the other will occur on August 12, 2045.

The most recent total solar eclipse in Colorado was on June 8, 1918; the most recent annular solar eclipse was on October 14, 2023; and the most recent partial solar eclipse was on April 8, 2024. The next total solar eclipse in Colorado will occur on August 12, 2045; the next annular solar eclipse will occur on June 11, 2048; and the next partial solar eclipse will occur on January 26, 2028.

- August 30, 1905 (P)
- August 20, 1906 (P)
- January 3, 1908 (P)
- June 28, 1908 (P)
- June 17, 1909 (P)
- April 28, 1911 (P)
- February 3, 1916 (P)
- June 8, 1918 (T)
- November 22, 1919 (P)
- November 10, 1920 (P)
- September 10, 1923 (P)
- January 24, 1925 (P)
- July 9, 1926 (P)
- April 28, 1930 (P)
- August 31, 1932 (P)
- February 3, 1935 (P)
- June 8, 1937 (P)
- December 2, 1937 (P)
- April 19, 1939 (P)
- April 7, 1940 (P)
- February 4, 1943 (P)
- January 25, 1944 (P)
- July 9, 1945 (P)
- November 23, 1946 (P)
- November 12, 1947 (P)
- March 7, 1951 (P)
- June 30, 1954 (P)
- April 30, 1957 (P)
- September 20, 1960 (P)
- July 20, 1963 (P)
- May 9, 1967 (P)
- September 11, 1969 (P)
- March 7, 1970 (P)
- July 10, 1972 (P)
- December 24, 1973 (P)
- December 13, 1974 (P)
- October 12, 1977 (P)
- February 26, 1979 (P)
- August 10, 1980 (P)
- May 30, 1984 (P)
- October 3, 1986 (P)
- March 7, 1989 (P)
- July 11, 1991 (P)
- January 4, 1992 (P)
- May 21, 1993 (P)
- May 10, 1994 (P)
- February 26, 1998 (P) †
- December 25, 2000 (P)
- December 14, 2001 (P)
- June 10, 2002 (P)
- April 8, 2005 (P)
- May 20, 2012 (A)
- October 23, 2014 (P)
- August 21, 2017 (P)
- October 14, 2023 (A)
- April 8, 2024 (P)
- → January 26, 2028 (P)
- January 14, 2029 (P)
- November 14, 2031 (P)
- March 30, 2033 (P)
- June 21, 2039 (P)
- November 4, 2040 (P)
- April 9, 2043 (P)
- August 22, 2044 (P)
- August 12, 2045 (T)
- February 5, 2046 (P)
- June 11, 2048 (A)
- March 30, 2052 (P)
- September 2, 2054 (P)
- January 27, 2055 (P)
- January 16, 2056 (P)
- July 12, 2056 (P)
- July 1, 2057 (P)
- June 22, 2066 (P)
- June 11, 2067 (P)
- November 24, 2068 (P)
- September 23, 2071 (P)
- November 15, 2077 (A)
- May 11, 2078 (P)
- February 27, 2082 (P) †
- February 16, 2083 (P)
- July 3, 2084 (P)
- December 16, 2085 (P)
- September 23, 2090 (P)
- February 7, 2092 (P)
- July 23, 2093 (P)
- December 7, 2094 (P)
- May 22, 2096 (P)
- May 11, 2097 (P)
- September 25, 2098 (P)
- March 21, 2099 (P)
- September 14, 2099 (P)
- March 10, 2100 (P)

== Connecticut ==
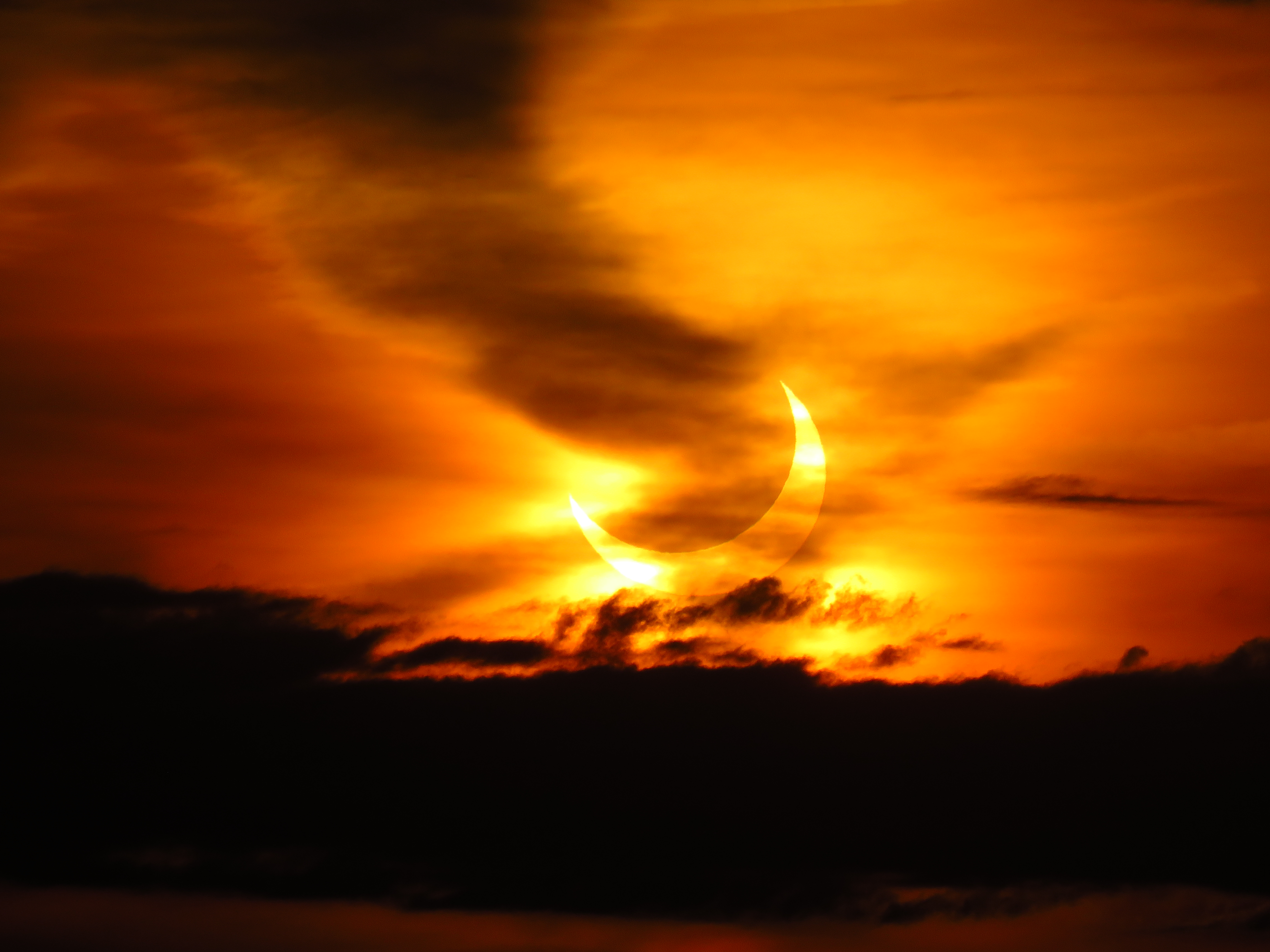
A view of the solar eclipse on June 10, 2021 from Killingly, Connecticut, during its partial phase

From 1900 to 2100, the state of Connecticut will have recorded a total of 76 solar eclipses, two of which are total eclipses. One total solar eclipse occurred on January 24, 1925, and the other will occur on May 1, 2079.

The most recent total solar eclipse in Connecticut was on January 24, 1925, and the most recent partial solar eclipse was on August 12, 2026. The next total solar eclipse in Connecticut will occur on May 1, 2079, and the next partial solar eclipse will occur on January 26, 2028.

- August 30, 1905 (P)
- June 28, 1908 (P)
- June 17, 1909 (P)
- April 17, 1912 (P)
- August 21, 1914 (P)
- February 3, 1916 (P)
- June 8, 1918 (P)
- November 22, 1919 (P)
- November 10, 1920 (P)
- September 10, 1923 (P)
- January 24, 1925 (T)
- April 28, 1930 (P)
- August 31, 1932 (P)
- February 3, 1935 (P)
- April 19, 1939 (P)
- April 7, 1940 (P)
- July 9, 1945 (P)
- November 23, 1946 (P)
- November 12, 1947 (P)
- March 7, 1951 (P)
- September 1, 1951 (P)
- June 30, 1954 (P)
- October 2, 1959 (P)
- July 20, 1963 (P)
- May 9, 1967 (P)
- March 7, 1970 (P)
- July 10, 1972 (P)
- December 24, 1973 (P)
- December 13, 1974 (P)
- April 29, 1976 (P) †
- October 12, 1977 (P)
- February 26, 1979 (P)
- May 30, 1984 (P)
- October 3, 1986 (P)
- July 11, 1991 (P)
- May 10, 1994 (P)
- February 26, 1998 (P)
- August 11, 1999 (P)
- December 25, 2000 (P)
- December 14, 2001 (P)
- November 3, 2013 (P)
- October 23, 2014 (P)
- August 21, 2017 (P)
- June 10, 2021 (P)
- October 14, 2023 (P)
- April 8, 2024 (P)
- March 29, 2025 (P)
- August 12, 2026 (P)
- → January 26, 2028 (P)
- January 14, 2029 (P)
- March 30, 2033 (P)
- January 5, 2038 (P)
- July 2, 2038 (P)
- June 21, 2039 (P)
- November 4, 2040 (P)
- August 12, 2045 (P)
- June 11, 2048 (P)
- November 14, 2050 (P)
- March 30, 2052 (P)
- January 27, 2055 (P)
- July 1, 2057 (P)
- June 22, 2066 (P)
- December 6, 2067 (P)
- April 21, 2069 (P)
- September 23, 2071 (P)
- November 15, 2077 (P)
- May 11, 2078 (P)
- May 1, 2079 (T)
- February 27, 2082 (P)
- February 16, 2083 (P)
- April 21, 2088 (P)
- September 23, 2090 (P)
- February 7, 2092 (P)
- July 23, 2093 (P)
- December 7, 2094 (P)
- September 14, 2099 (P)

== Delaware ==
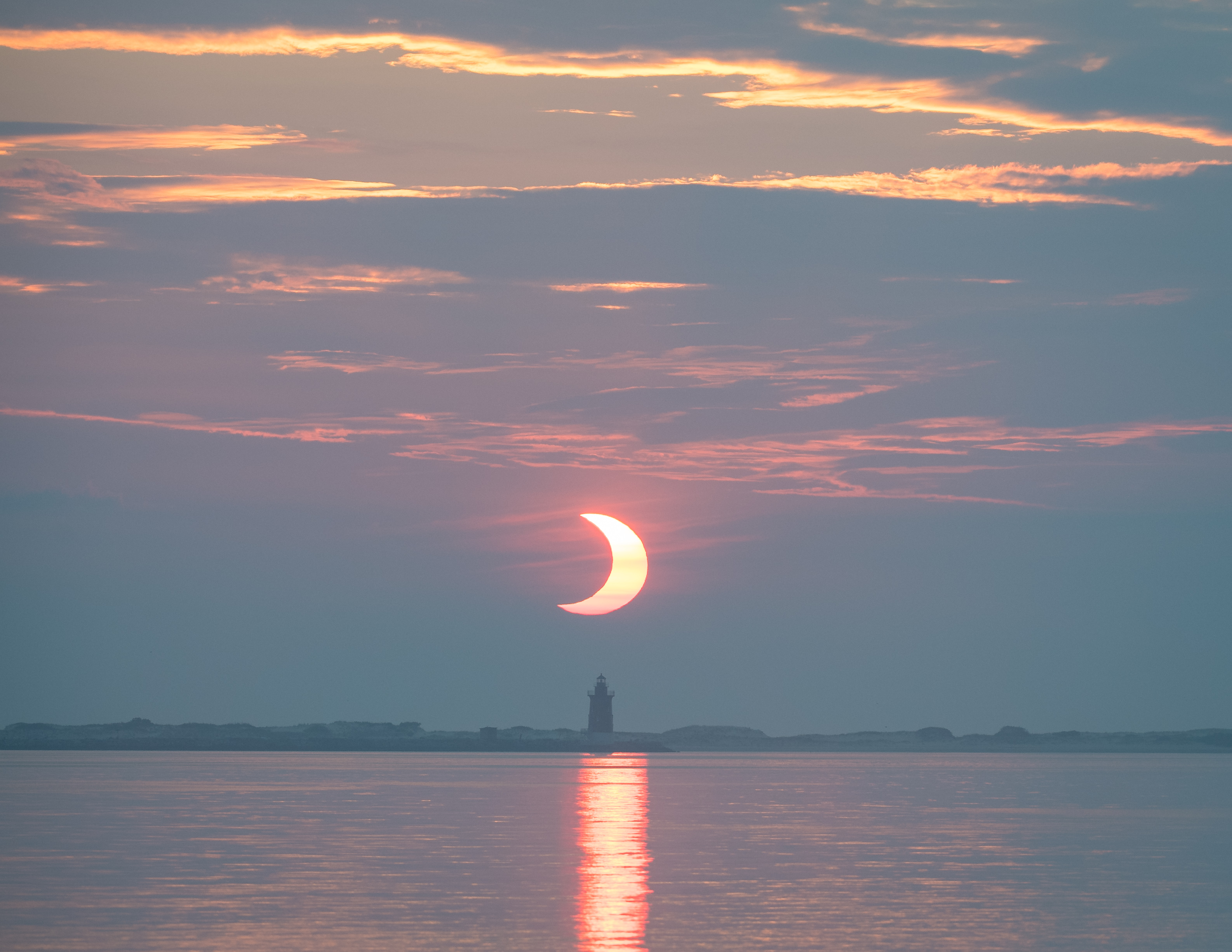
A view of the solar eclipse on June 10, 2021 from Lewes, Delaware, during its partial phase

From 1900 to 2100, the state of Delaware will have recorded a total of 78 solar eclipses, one of which is a total eclipse. That total solar eclipse will on May 1, 2079.

The most recent partial solar eclipse was on August 12, 2026. The next total solar eclipse in Delaware will occur on May 1, 2079, and the next partial solar eclipse will occur on January 26, 2028.

- August 30, 1905 (P)
- June 28, 1908 (P)
- June 17, 1909 (P)
- April 28, 1911 (P)
- April 17, 1912 (P)
- August 21, 1914 (P)
- February 3, 1916 (P)
- June 8, 1918 (P)
- November 22, 1919 (P)
- November 10, 1920 (P)
- September 10, 1923 (P)
- January 24, 1925 (P)
- April 28, 1930 (P)
- August 31, 1932 (P)
- February 3, 1935 (P)
- April 19, 1939 (P)
- April 7, 1940 (P)
- July 9, 1945 (P)
- November 23, 1946 (P)
- November 12, 1947 (P)
- March 7, 1951 (P)
- September 1, 1951 (P)
- June 30, 1954 (P)
- October 2, 1959 (P)
- July 20, 1963 (P)
- May 9, 1967 (P)
- March 7, 1970 (P)
- July 10, 1972 (P)
- December 24, 1973 (P)
- December 13, 1974 (P)
- October 12, 1977 (P)
- February 26, 1979 (P)
- May 30, 1984 (P)
- October 3, 1986 (P)
- July 11, 1991 (P)
- May 10, 1994 (P)
- February 26, 1998 (P)
- August 11, 1999 (P)
- December 25, 2000 (P)
- December 14, 2001 (P)
- April 8, 2005 (P)
- November 3, 2013 (P)
- October 23, 2014 (P)
- August 21, 2017 (P)
- June 10, 2021 (P)
- October 14, 2023 (P)
- April 8, 2024 (P)
- March 29, 2025 (P)
- August 12, 2026 (P)
- → January 26, 2028 (P)
- January 14, 2029 (P)
- November 14, 2031 (P)
- March 30, 2033 (P)
- January 5, 2038 (P)
- July 2, 2038 (P)
- June 21, 2039 (P)
- November 4, 2040 (P)
- August 12, 2045 (P)
- June 11, 2048 (P)
- November 14, 2050 (P)
- March 30, 2052 (P)
- January 27, 2055 (P)
- July 12, 2056 (P)
- July 1, 2057 (P)
- June 22, 2066 (P)
- June 11, 2067 (P)
- December 6, 2067 (P)
- September 23, 2071 (P)
- November 15, 2077 (P)
- May 11, 2078 (P)
- May 1, 2079 (T)
- February 27, 2082 (P)
- February 16, 2083 (P)
- September 23, 2090 (P)
- February 7, 2092 (P)
- July 23, 2093 (P)
- December 7, 2094 (P)
- September 14, 2099 (P)

== District of Columbia ==
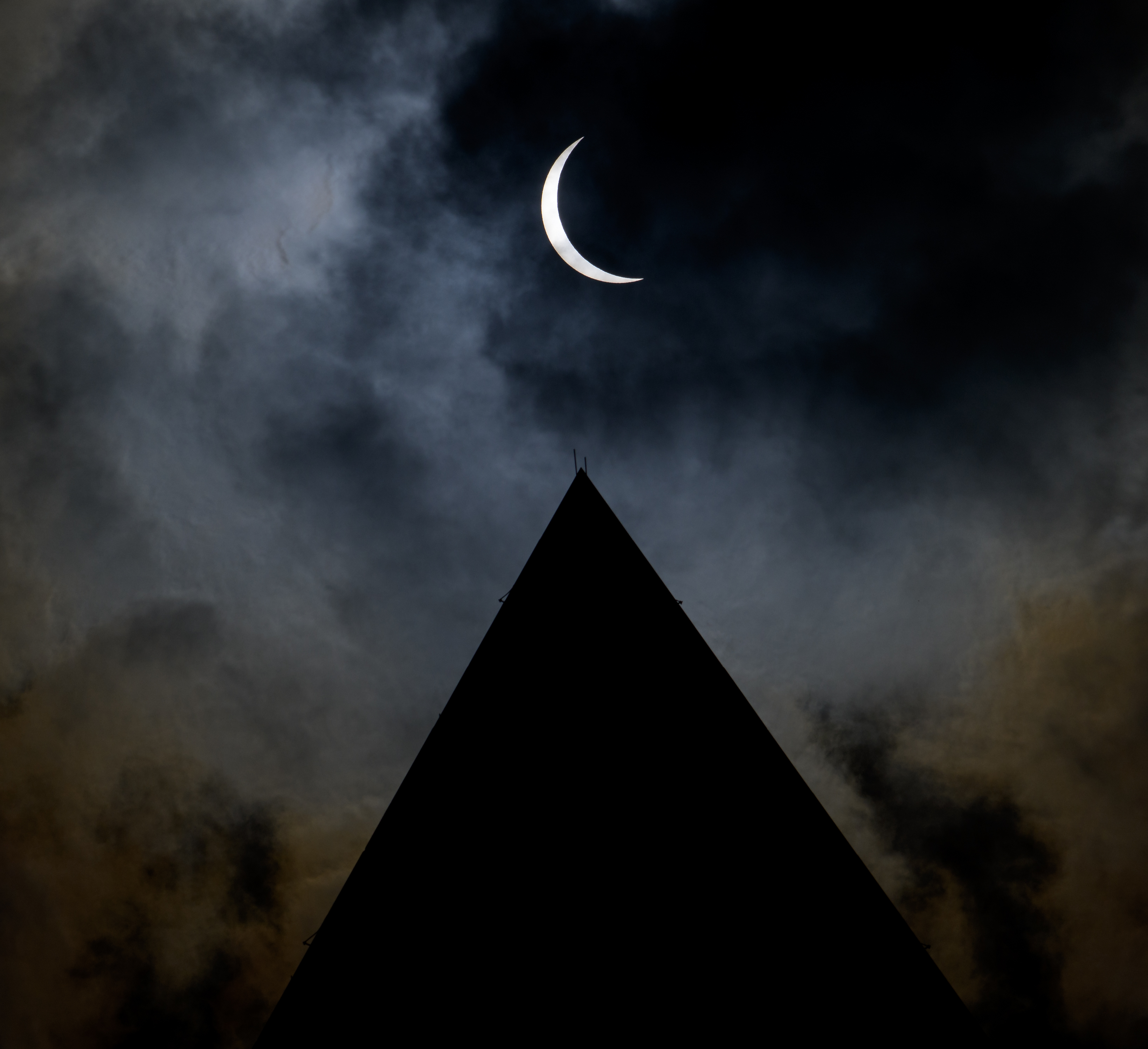
A view of the solar eclipse on April 8, 2024 from Washington, D.C. above the Washington Monument, during its partial phase

From 1900 to 2100, the District of Columbia will have recorded a total of 78 solar eclipses, of which none were or will be total or annular eclipses. The District of Columbia is the only territory of the United States, except for Puerto Rico and the U.S. Virgin Islands, to not experience an annular or total solar eclipse from 1900 to 2100.

The most recent partial solar eclipse was on August 12, 2026, and the next partial solar eclipse will occur on January 26, 2028.

- August 30, 1905 (P)
- June 28, 1908 (P)
- June 17, 1909 (P)
- April 28, 1911 (P)
- April 17, 1912 (P)
- August 21, 1914 (P)
- February 3, 1916 (P)
- June 8, 1918 (P)
- November 22, 1919 (P)
- November 10, 1920 (P)
- September 10, 1923 (P)
- January 24, 1925 (P)
- April 28, 1930 (P)
- August 31, 1932 (P)
- February 3, 1935 (P)
- April 19, 1939 (P)
- April 7, 1940 (P)
- July 9, 1945 (P)
- November 23, 1946 (P)
- November 12, 1947 (P)
- March 7, 1951 (P)
- September 1, 1951 (P)
- June 30, 1954 (P)
- October 2, 1959 (P)
- July 20, 1963 (P)
- May 9, 1967 (P)
- March 7, 1970 (P)
- July 10, 1972 (P)
- December 24, 1973 (P)
- December 13, 1974 (P)
- October 12, 1977 (P)
- February 26, 1979 (P)
- May 30, 1984 (P)
- October 3, 1986 (P)
- July 11, 1991 (P)
- May 10, 1994 (P)
- February 26, 1998 (P)
- August 11, 1999 (P)
- December 25, 2000 (P)
- December 14, 2001 (P)
- June 10, 2002 (P)
- April 8, 2005 (P)
- November 3, 2013 (P)
- October 23, 2014 (P)
- August 21, 2017 (P)
- June 10, 2021 (P)
- October 14, 2023 (P)
- April 8, 2024 (P)
- March 29, 2025 (P)
- August 12, 2026 (P)
- → January 26, 2028 (P)
- January 14, 2029 (P)
- November 14, 2031 (P)
- March 30, 2033 (P)
- January 5, 2038 (P)
- July 2, 2038 (P)
- November 4, 2040 (P)
- August 12, 2045 (P)
- June 11, 2048 (P)
- November 14, 2050 (P)
- March 30, 2052 (P)
- January 27, 2055 (P)
- July 12, 2056 (P)
- July 1, 2057 (P)
- June 22, 2066 (P)
- June 11, 2067 (P)
- December 6, 2067 (P)
- September 23, 2071 (P)
- November 15, 2077 (P)
- May 11, 2078 (P)
- May 1, 2079 (P)
- February 27, 2082 (P)
- February 16, 2083 (P)
- September 23, 2090 (P)
- February 7, 2092 (P)
- July 23, 2093 (P)
- December 7, 2094 (P)
- September 14, 2099 (P)

== Florida ==
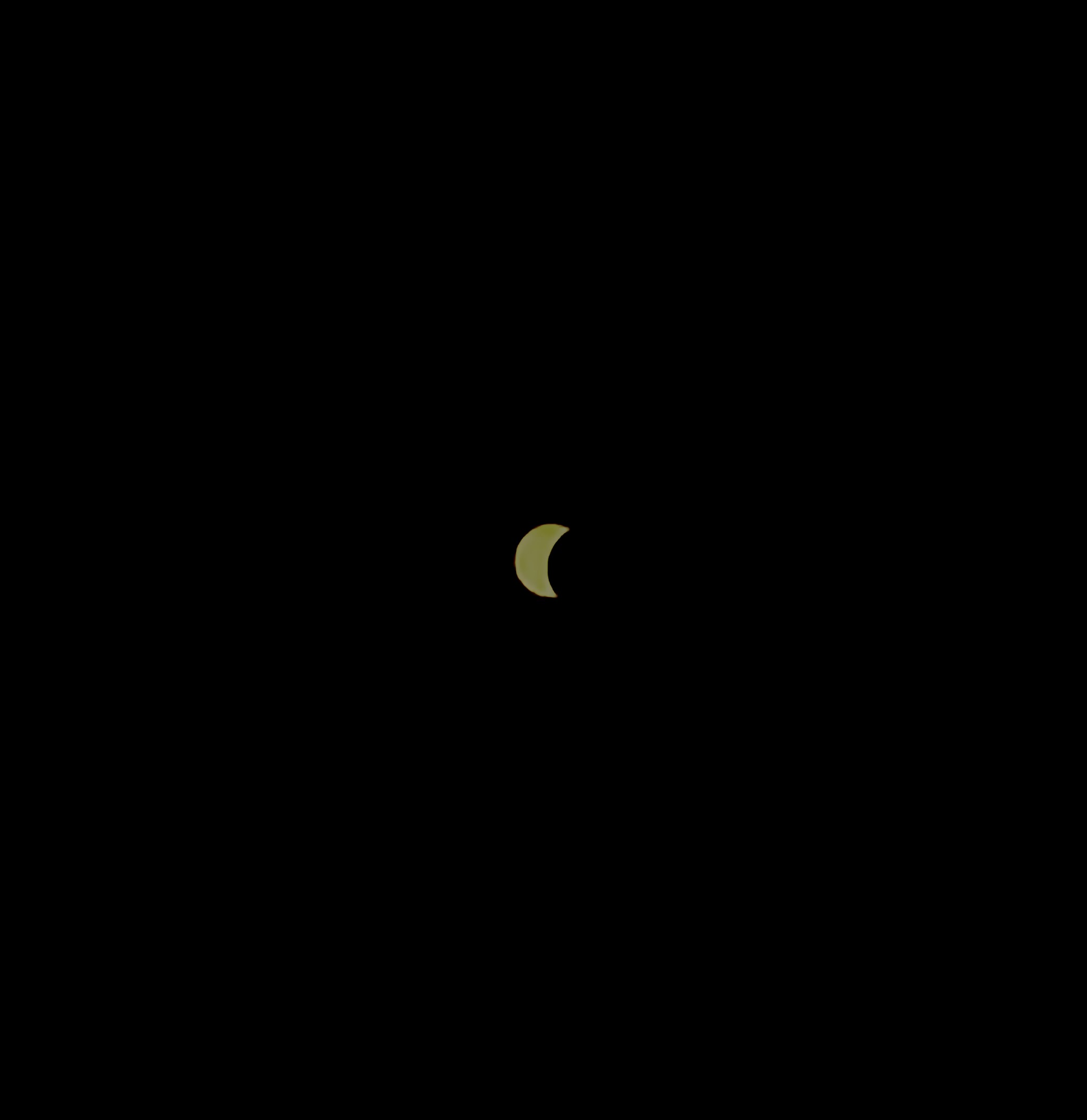
A view of the solar eclipse on April 8, 2024 from Fort Lauderdale, Florida, during its partial phase

From 1900 to 2100, the state of Florida will have recorded a total of 93 solar eclipses, two of which are annular eclipses and five of which are total eclipses. The two annular solar eclipses occurred on June 28, 1908 and April 7, 1940. Two total solar eclipses occurred on June 8, 1918 and March 7, 1970, and three more will occur on August 12, 2045; March 30, 2052; and May 11, 2078.

The most recent total solar eclipse in Florida was on March 7, 1970; the most recent annular solar eclipse was on April 7, 1940; and the most recent partial solar eclipse was on April 8, 2024. The next total solar eclipse in Florida will occur on August 12, 2045, and the next partial solar eclipse will occur on January 26, 2028.

- August 30, 1905 (P)
- January 3, 1908 (P)
- June 28, 1908 (A)
- June 17, 1909 (P)
- April 28, 1911 (P)
- April 17, 1912 (P)
- October 10, 1912 (P)
- February 3, 1916 (P)
- June 8, 1918 (T)
- November 22, 1919 (P)
- November 10, 1920 (P)
- March 28, 1922 (P)
- September 10, 1923 (P)
- January 24, 1925 (P)
- July 9, 1926 (P)
- April 28, 1930 (P)
- August 31, 1932 (P)
- February 3, 1935 (P)
- June 8, 1937 (P)
- April 19, 1939 (P)
- April 7, 1940 (A)
- October 1, 1940 (P)
- January 25, 1944 (P)
- July 9, 1945 (P)
- November 23, 1946 (P)
- November 12, 1947 (P)
- March 7, 1951 (P)
- September 1, 1951 (P)
- August 20, 1952 (P) †
- June 30, 1954 (P)
- October 2, 1959 (P)
- September 20, 1960 (P)
- July 31, 1962 (P)
- July 20, 1963 (P)
- May 30, 1965 (P) †
- November 12, 1966 (P)
- May 9, 1967 (P)
- September 11, 1969 (P)
- March 7, 1970 (T)
- July 10, 1972 (P)
- June 30, 1973 (P) †
- December 24, 1973 (P)
- December 13, 1974 (P)
- October 12, 1977 (P)
- February 26, 1979 (P)
- August 10, 1980 (P)
- May 30, 1984 (P)
- October 3, 1986 (P)
- July 11, 1991 (P)
- May 10, 1994 (P)
- April 29, 1995 (P)
- February 26, 1998 (P)
- December 25, 2000 (P)
- December 14, 2001 (P)
- June 10, 2002 (P)
- April 8, 2005 (P)
- May 20, 2012 (P)
- November 3, 2013 (P)
- October 23, 2014 (P)
- August 21, 2017 (P)
- October 14, 2023 (P)
- April 8, 2024 (P)
- → January 26, 2028 (P)
- January 14, 2029 (P)
- November 14, 2031 (P)
- January 5, 2038 (P)
- July 2, 2038 (P)
- November 4, 2040 (P)
- August 12, 2045 (T)
- June 11, 2048 (P)
- May 31, 2049 (P)
- March 30, 2052 (T)
- January 27, 2055 (P)
- January 16, 2056 (P)
- July 12, 2056 (P)
- July 1, 2057 (P)
- May 11, 2059 (P)
- June 22, 2066 (P)
- June 11, 2067 (P)
- December 6, 2067 (P)
- November 24, 2068 (P)
- September 23, 2071 (P)
- November 15, 2077 (P)
- May 11, 2078 (T)
- May 1, 2079 (P) †
- February 27, 2082 (P)
- February 16, 2083 (P)
- September 23, 2090 (P)
- February 7, 2092 (P)
- July 23, 2093 (P)
- December 7, 2094 (P)
- September 14, 2099 (P)
- March 10, 2100 (P)

== Georgia ==
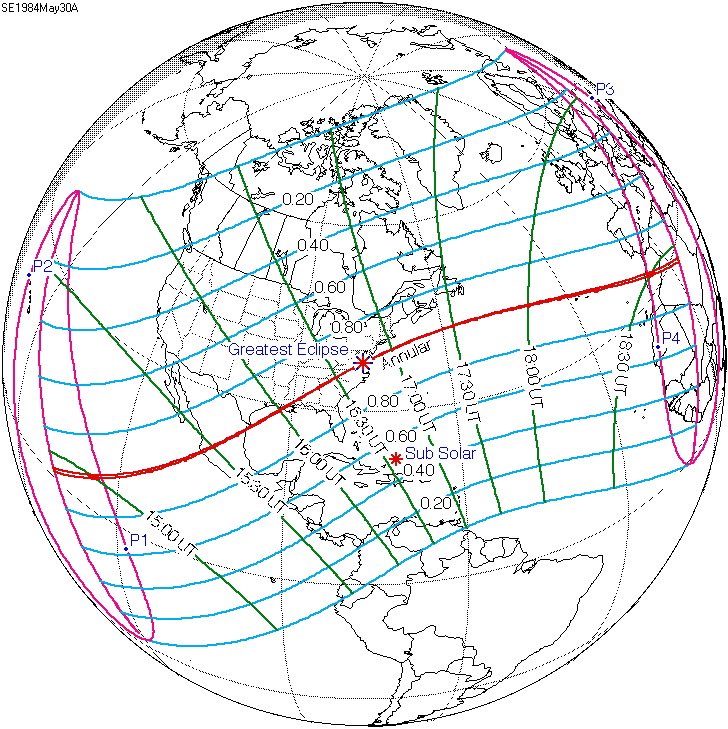
The path of the most recent annular solar eclipse to cross Georgia on May 30, 1984

From 1900 to 2100, the state of Georgia will have recorded a total of 85 solar eclipses, two of which are annular eclipses and five of which are total eclipses. The two annular solar eclipses occurred on April 7, 1940 and May 30, 1984. Two total solar eclipses occurred on March 7, 1970 and August 21, 2017, and three more will occur on August 12, 2045; March 30, 2052; and May 11, 2078.

The most recent total solar eclipse in Georgia was on August 21, 2017; the most recent annular solar eclipse was on May 30, 1984; and the most recent partial solar eclipse was on April 8, 2024. The next total solar eclipse in Georgia will occur on August 12, 2045, and the next partial solar eclipse will occur on January 26, 2028.

- August 30, 1905 (P)
- January 3, 1908 (P)
- June 28, 1908 (P)
- June 17, 1909 (P)
- April 28, 1911 (P)
- April 17, 1912 (P)
- October 10, 1912 (P)
- February 3, 1916 (P)
- June 8, 1918 (P)
- November 22, 1919 (P)
- November 10, 1920 (P)
- March 28, 1922 (P)
- September 10, 1923 (P)
- January 24, 1925 (P)
- July 9, 1926 (P)
- April 28, 1930 (P)
- August 31, 1932 (P)
- February 3, 1935 (P)
- April 19, 1939 (P)
- April 7, 1940 (A)
- October 1, 1940 (P)
- July 9, 1945 (P)
- November 23, 1946 (P)
- November 12, 1947 (P)
- March 7, 1951 (P)
- September 1, 1951 (P)
- June 30, 1954 (P)
- October 2, 1959 (P)
- September 20, 1960 (P)
- July 31, 1962 (P)
- July 20, 1963 (P)
- May 9, 1967 (P)
- September 11, 1969 (P)
- March 7, 1970 (T)
- July 10, 1972 (P)
- December 24, 1973 (P)
- December 13, 1974 (P)
- October 12, 1977 (P)
- February 26, 1979 (P)
- May 30, 1984 (A)
- October 3, 1986 (P)
- July 11, 1991 (P)
- May 10, 1994 (P)
- February 26, 1998 (P)
- December 25, 2000 (P)
- December 14, 2001 (P)
- June 10, 2002 (P)
- April 8, 2005 (P)
- May 20, 2012 (P)
- November 3, 2013 (P)
- October 23, 2014 (P)
- August 21, 2017 (T)
- June 10, 2021 (P)
- October 14, 2023 (P)
- April 8, 2024 (P)
- → January 26, 2028 (P)
- January 14, 2029 (P)
- November 14, 2031 (P)
- January 5, 2038 (P)
- July 2, 2038 (P)
- November 4, 2040 (P)
- August 12, 2045 (T)
- June 11, 2048 (P)
- May 31, 2049 (P)
- March 30, 2052 (T)
- January 27, 2055 (P)
- January 16, 2056 (P)
- July 12, 2056 (P)
- July 1, 2057 (P)
- June 22, 2066 (P)
- June 11, 2067 (P)
- December 6, 2067 (P)
- November 24, 2068 (P)
- September 23, 2071 (P)
- November 15, 2077 (P)
- May 11, 2078 (T)
- May 1, 2079 (P)
- February 27, 2082 (P)
- February 16, 2083 (P)
- September 23, 2090 (P)
- February 7, 2092 (P)
- July 23, 2093 (P)
- December 7, 2094 (P)
- September 14, 2099 (P)
- March 10, 2100 (P)

== Hawaii ==
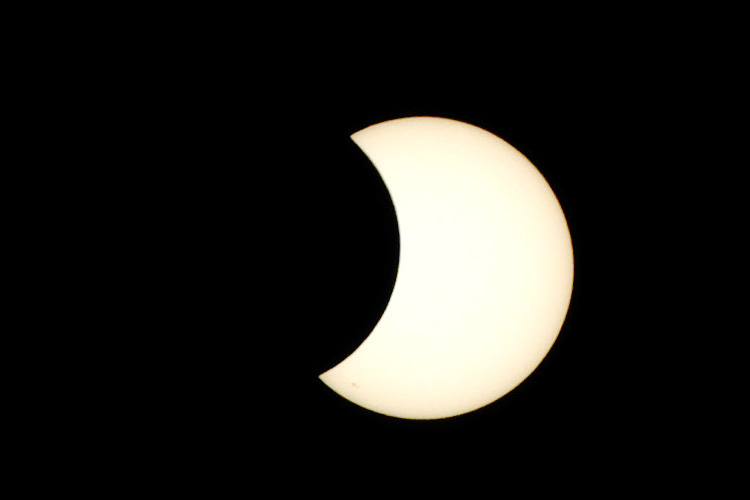
A view of the solar eclipse on May 10, 2013 from Waikiki, Hawaii, during its partial phase

From 1900 to 2100, the state of Hawaii will have recorded a total of 84 solar eclipses, two of which are annular eclipses and one of which is a total eclipse. The two annular solar eclipses will occur on February 5, 2046 and March 10, 2100. One total solar eclipse occurred on July 11, 1991.

The most recent total solar eclipse in Hawaii was on July 11, 1991, and the most recent partial solar eclipse was on October 2, 2024. The next annular solar eclipse will occur on February 5, 2046, and the next partial solar eclipse will occur on November 14, 2031.

- September 9, 1904 (P)
- January 3, 1908 (P)
- November 2, 1910 (P)
- April 28, 1911 (P)
- August 10, 1915 (P)
- June 8, 1918 (P)
- September 10, 1923 (P)
- July 9, 1926 (P)
- April 28, 1930 (P)
- February 14, 1934 (P)
- June 8, 1937 (P)
- December 2, 1937 (P)
- November 21, 1938 (P)
- April 19, 1939 (P) †
- April 7, 1940 (P)
- February 4, 1943 (P)
- November 12, 1947 (P)
- May 9, 1948 (P)
- September 12, 1950 (P)
- April 19, 1958 (P)
- February 5, 1962 (P)
- December 4, 1964 (P)
- May 30, 1965 (P)
- September 11, 1969 (P)
- March 7, 1970 (P)
- August 31, 1970 (P)
- October 12, 1977 (P)
- August 10, 1980 (P)
- July 31, 1981 (P)
- May 30, 1984 (P)
- September 23, 1987 (P)
- March 18, 1988 (P)
- March 7, 1989 (P)
- July 22, 1990 (P)
- July 11, 1991 (T)
- January 4, 1992 (P)
- December 24, 1992 (P)
- May 10, 1994 (P)
- February 26, 1998 (P)
- December 14, 2001 (P)
- June 10, 2002 (P)
- October 14, 2004 (P)
- July 22, 2009 (P)
- May 20, 2012 (P)
- May 10, 2013 (P)
- March 9, 2016 (P)
- August 21, 2017 (P)
- October 14, 2023 (P)
- April 8, 2024 (P)
- October 2, 2024 (P)
- → November 14, 2031 (P)
- March 30, 2033 (P)
- September 2, 2035 (P)
- June 21, 2039 (P)
- October 25, 2041 (P)
- April 20, 2042 (P)
- April 9, 2043 (P)
- August 22, 2044 (P)
- February 16, 2045 (P)
- August 12, 2045 (P)
- February 5, 2046 (A)
- March 30, 2052 (P)
- September 2, 2054 (P) †
- January 16, 2056 (P)
- July 12, 2056 (P)
- August 24, 2063 (P)
- August 12, 2064 (P)
- June 11, 2067 (P)
- November 24, 2068 (P)
- April 11, 2070 (P)
- September 23, 2071 (P)
- May 11, 2078 (P)
- February 16, 2083 (P)
- July 3, 2084 (P)
- June 22, 2085 (P)
- December 16, 2085 (P)
- April 10, 2089 (P)
- October 4, 2089 (P)
- November 27, 2095 (P)
- May 22, 2096 (P)
- May 11, 2097 (P)
- September 25, 2098 (P)
- March 21, 2099 (P)
- March 10, 2100 (A)

== Idaho ==
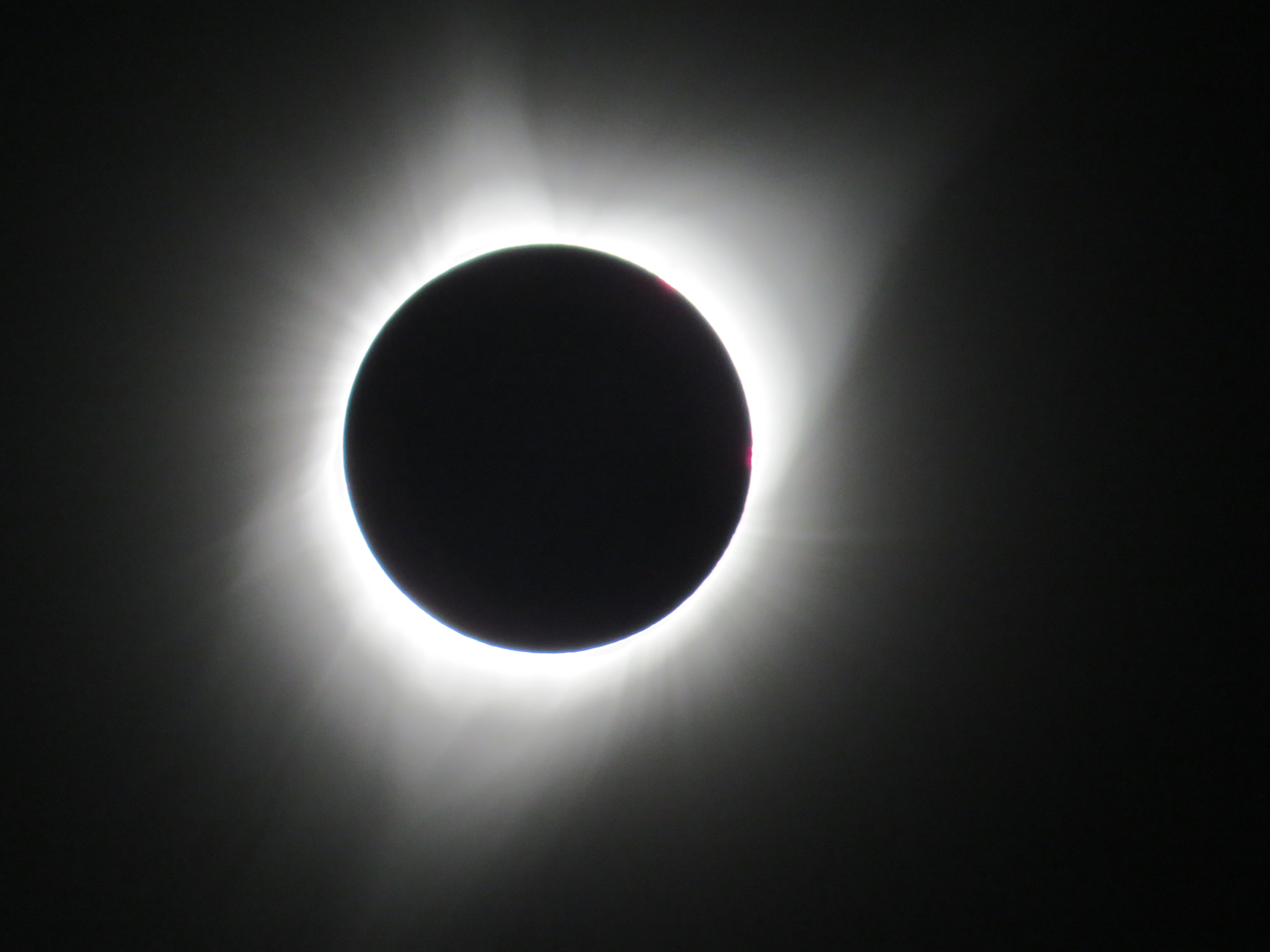
A view of the solar eclipse on August 21, 2017 from Weiser, Idaho, during totality

From 1900 to 2100, the state of Idaho will have recorded a total of 92 solar eclipses, five of which are annular eclipses, four of which are total eclipses, and one of which is a hybrid eclipse. One annular solar eclipse occurred on October 14, 2023, and the remaining four will occur on February 5, 2046; November 15, 2077; July 3, 2084; and March 10, 2100. The four total solar eclipses occurred on June 8, 1918; July 9, 1945; February 26, 1979; and August 21, 2017. The lone hybrid eclipse, of which its total eclipse portion passed over Idaho, occurred on April 28, 1930.

The most recent total solar eclipse in Idaho was on August 21, 2017; the most recent annular solar eclipse was on October 14, 2023; and the most recent partial solar eclipse was on April 8, 2024. The next annular solar eclipse will occur on February 5, 2046, and the next partial solar eclipse will occur on January 26, 2028.

- August 20, 1906 (P)
- June 28, 1908 (P)
- June 17, 1909 (P)
- April 28, 1911 (P)
- April 6, 1913 (P)
- February 3, 1916 (P)
- June 19, 1917 (P)
- June 8, 1918 (T)
- November 22, 1919 (P)
- November 10, 1920 (P)
- September 10, 1923 (P)
- January 24, 1925 (P) †
- July 9, 1926 (P)
- April 28, 1930 (H)
- August 31, 1932 (P)
- February 3, 1935 (P)
- December 2, 1937 (P)
- November 21, 1938 (P)
- April 19, 1939 (P)
- April 7, 1940 (P)
- February 4, 1943 (P)
- July 9, 1945 (T)
- November 23, 1946 (P)
- November 12, 1947 (P)
- May 9, 1948 (P)
- March 7, 1951 (P)
- July 11, 1953 (P)
- June 30, 1954 (P)
- April 30, 1957 (P)
- September 20, 1960 (P)
- February 5, 1962 (P)
- July 20, 1963 (P)
- May 9, 1967 (P)
- September 11, 1969 (P)
- March 7, 1970 (P)
- July 10, 1972 (P)
- December 13, 1974 (P)
- October 12, 1977 (P)
- February 26, 1979 (T)
- May 30, 1984 (P)
- October 3, 1986 (P)
- March 7, 1989 (P)
- July 22, 1990 (P)
- July 11, 1991 (P)
- January 4, 1992 (P)
- May 21, 1993 (P)
- May 10, 1994 (P)
- July 31, 2000 (P)
- December 25, 2000 (P)
- December 14, 2001 (P)
- June 10, 2002 (P)
- May 20, 2012 (P)
- October 23, 2014 (P)
- August 21, 2017 (T) †
- October 14, 2023 (A) †
- April 8, 2024 (P)
- → January 26, 2028 (P) †
- January 14, 2029 (P)
- March 30, 2033 (P)
- June 21, 2039 (P)
- November 4, 2040 (P)
- April 9, 2043 (P)
- August 22, 2044 (P)
- August 12, 2045 (P)
- February 5, 2046 (A)
- June 11, 2048 (P)
- March 30, 2052 (P)
- September 2, 2054 (P)
- January 27, 2055 (P)
- January 16, 2056 (P)
- July 12, 2056 (P)
- July 1, 2057 (P)
- June 22, 2066 (P)
- June 11, 2067 (P)
- November 24, 2068 (P)
- September 23, 2071 (P)
- November 15, 2077 (A)
- May 11, 2078 (P)
- February 16, 2083 (P)
- July 3, 2084 (A)
- December 16, 2085 (P)
- May 2, 2087 (P)
- September 23, 2090 (P)
- February 7, 2092 (P)
- July 23, 2093 (P)
- July 12, 2094 (P)
- December 7, 2094 (P)
- May 22, 2096 (P)
- May 11, 2097 (P)
- September 25, 2098 (P)
- September 14, 2099 (P)
- March 10, 2100 (A)

== Illinois ==
A view of the solar eclipse on August 21, 2017 from Makanda, Illinois, during totality. A diamond ring effect can be seen here.

From 1900 to 2100, the state of Illinois will have recorded a total of 84 solar eclipses, three of which are annular eclipses and three of which are total eclipses. One annular solar eclipse occurred on May 10, 1994, and the other two will occur on June 11, 2048 and July 23, 2093. Two total solar eclipses occurred on August 21, 2017 and April 8, 2024, and one more will occur on September 14, 2099.

The most recent total solar eclipse in Illinois was on April 8, 2024; the most recent annular solar eclipse was on May 10, 1994; and the most recent partial solar eclipse was on August 12, 2026. The next total solar eclipse in Illinois will occur on September 14, 2099; the next annular solar eclipse will occur on June 11, 2048; and the next partial solar eclipse will occur on January 26, 2028.

- August 30, 1905 (P)
- January 3, 1908 (P)
- June 28, 1908 (P)
- June 17, 1909 (P)
- April 28, 1911 (P)
- April 17, 1912 (P)
- August 21, 1914 (P)
- February 3, 1916 (P)
- June 8, 1918 (P)
- November 22, 1919 (P)
- November 10, 1920 (P)
- September 10, 1923 (P)
- January 24, 1925 (P)
- July 9, 1926 (P) †
- April 28, 1930 (P)
- August 31, 1932 (P)
- February 3, 1935 (P)
- April 19, 1939 (P)
- April 7, 1940 (P)
- July 9, 1945 (P)
- November 23, 1946 (P)
- November 12, 1947 (P)
- March 7, 1951 (P)
- September 1, 1951 (P)
- June 30, 1954 (P)
- September 20, 1960 (P)
- July 20, 1963 (P)
- May 9, 1967 (P)
- September 11, 1969 (P)
- March 7, 1970 (P)
- July 10, 1972 (P)
- December 24, 1973 (P)
- December 13, 1974 (P)
- October 12, 1977 (P)
- February 26, 1979 (P)
- May 30, 1984 (P)
- October 3, 1986 (P)
- March 7, 1989 (P)
- July 11, 1991 (P)
- May 21, 1993 (P)
- May 10, 1994 (A)
- February 26, 1998 (P)
- December 25, 2000 (P)
- December 14, 2001 (P)
- June 10, 2002 (P)
- April 8, 2005 (P)
- May 20, 2012 (P)
- October 23, 2014 (P)
- August 21, 2017 (T)
- June 10, 2021 (P)
- October 14, 2023 (P)
- April 8, 2024 (T)
- August 12, 2026 (P)
- → January 26, 2028 (P)
- January 14, 2029 (P)
- November 14, 2031 (P)
- March 30, 2033 (P)
- January 5, 2038 (P)
- July 2, 2038 (P)
- June 21, 2039 (P)
- November 4, 2040 (P)
- August 12, 2045 (P)
- June 11, 2048 (A)
- March 30, 2052 (P)
- January 27, 2055 (P)
- January 16, 2056 (P)
- July 12, 2056 (P)
- July 1, 2057 (P)
- June 22, 2066 (P)
- June 11, 2067 (P)
- December 6, 2067 (P)
- November 24, 2068 (P)
- September 23, 2071 (P)
- November 15, 2077 (P)
- May 11, 2078 (P)
- May 1, 2079 (P)
- February 27, 2082 (P)
- February 16, 2083 (P)
- September 23, 2090 (P)
- February 7, 2092 (P)
- July 23, 2093 (A)
- December 7, 2094 (P)
- September 14, 2099 (T)
- March 10, 2100 (P)

== Indiana ==
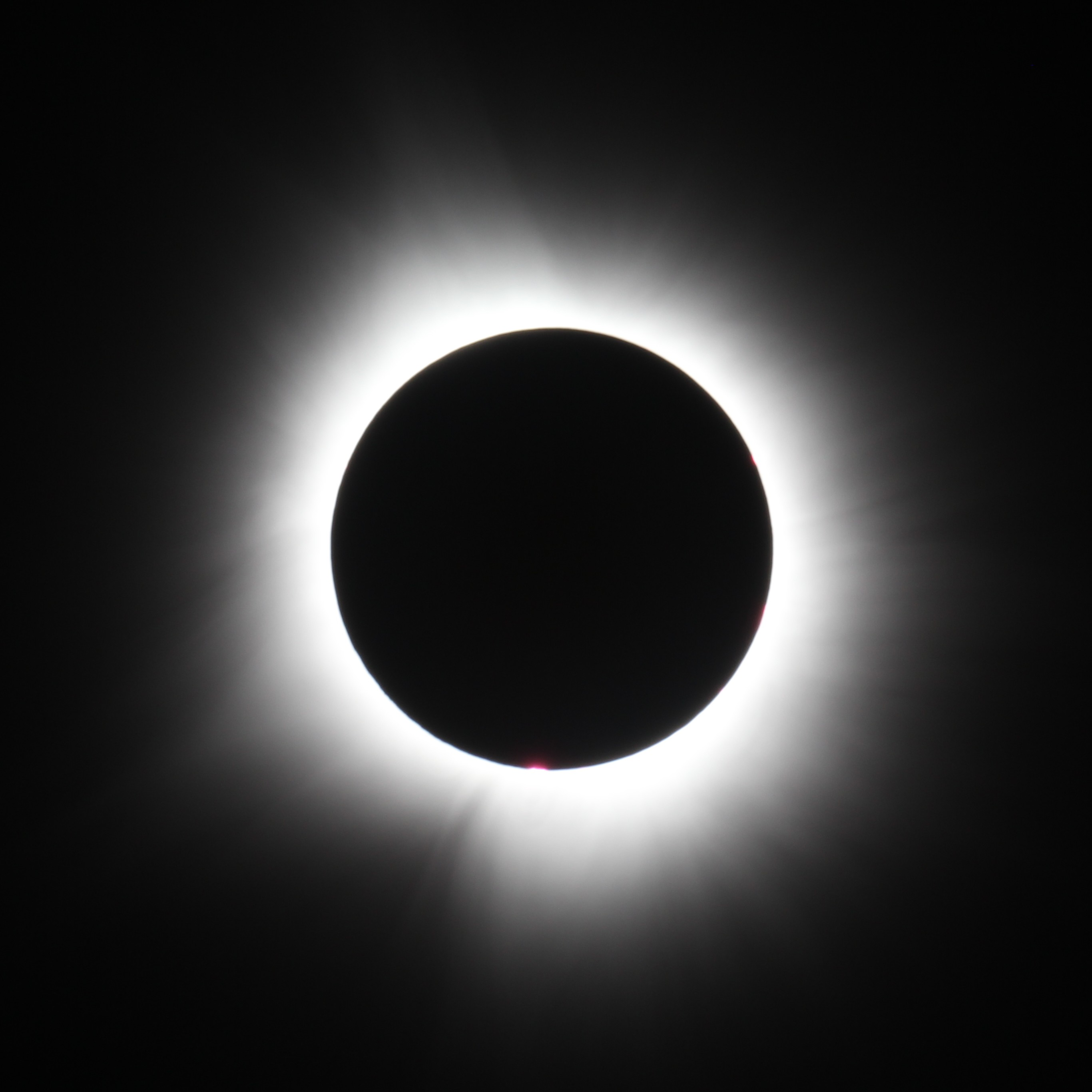
A view of the solar eclipse on April 8, 2024 from Indianapolis, Indiana, during totality

From 1900 to 2100, the state of Indiana will have recorded a total of 84 solar eclipses, two of which are annular eclipses and two of which are total eclipses. One annular solar eclipse occurred on May 10, 1994, and the other will occur on July 23, 2093. One total solar eclipses occurred on April 8, 2024, and the other will occur on September 14, 2099.

The most recent total solar eclipse in Indiana was on April 8, 2024; the most recent annular solar eclipse was on May 10, 1994; and the most recent partial solar eclipse was on August 12, 2026. The next total solar eclipse in Indiana will occur on September 14, 2099; the next annular solar eclipse will occur on July 23, 2093; and the next partial solar eclipse will occur on January 26, 2028.

- August 30, 1905 (P)
- January 3, 1908 (P)
- June 28, 1908 (P)
- June 17, 1909 (P)
- April 28, 1911 (P)
- April 17, 1912 (P)
- August 21, 1914 (P)
- February 3, 1916 (P)
- June 8, 1918 (P)
- November 22, 1919 (P)
- November 10, 1920 (P)
- September 10, 1923 (P)
- January 24, 1925 (P)
- April 28, 1930 (P)
- August 31, 1932 (P)
- February 3, 1935 (P)
- April 19, 1939 (P)
- April 7, 1940 (P)
- July 9, 1945 (P)
- November 23, 1946 (P)
- November 12, 1947 (P)
- March 7, 1951 (P)
- September 1, 1951 (P)
- June 30, 1954 (P)
- October 2, 1959 (P)
- September 20, 1960 (P)
- July 20, 1963 (P)
- May 9, 1967 (P)
- September 11, 1969 (P)
- March 7, 1970 (P)
- July 10, 1972 (P)
- December 24, 1973 (P)
- December 13, 1974 (P)
- October 12, 1977 (P)
- February 26, 1979 (P)
- May 30, 1984 (P)
- October 3, 1986 (P)
- July 11, 1991 (P)
- May 21, 1993 (P)
- May 10, 1994 (A)
- February 26, 1998 (P)
- December 25, 2000 (P)
- December 14, 2001 (P)
- June 10, 2002 (P)
- April 8, 2005 (P)
- May 20, 2012 (P)
- October 23, 2014 (P)
- August 21, 2017 (P)
- June 10, 2021 (P)
- October 14, 2023 (P)
- April 8, 2024 (T)
- August 12, 2026 (P)
- → January 26, 2028 (P)
- January 14, 2029 (P)
- November 14, 2031 (P)
- March 30, 2033 (P)
- January 5, 2038 (P)
- July 2, 2038 (P)
- June 21, 2039 (P)
- November 4, 2040 (P)
- August 12, 2045 (P)
- June 11, 2048 (P)
- November 14, 2050 (P)
- March 30, 2052 (P)
- January 27, 2055 (P)
- January 16, 2056 (P)
- July 12, 2056 (P)
- July 1, 2057 (P)
- June 22, 2066 (P)
- June 11, 2067 (P)
- December 6, 2067 (P)
- November 24, 2068 (P)
- September 23, 2071 (P)
- November 15, 2077 (P)
- May 11, 2078 (P)
- May 1, 2079 (P)
- February 27, 2082 (P)
- February 16, 2083 (P)
- September 23, 2090 (P)
- February 7, 2092 (P)
- July 23, 2093 (A)
- December 7, 2094 (P)
- September 14, 2099 (T)
- March 10, 2100 (P)

== Iowa ==
An animation of the next annular solar eclipse to cross Iowa on June 11, 2048

From 1900 to 2100, the state of Iowa will have recorded a total of 84 solar eclipses, one of which is an annular eclipse and three of which are total eclipses. The one annular solar eclipse will occur on June 11, 2048. Two total solar eclipses occurred on June 30, 1954 and August 21, 2017, and the other will occur on September 14, 2099.

The most recent total solar eclipse in Iowa was on August 21, 2017, and the most recent partial solar eclipse was on August 12, 2026. The next total solar eclipse in Iowa will occur on September 14, 2099; the next annular solar eclipse will occur on June 11, 2048; and the next partial solar eclipse will occur on January 26, 2028.

- August 30, 1905 (P)
- January 3, 1908 (P)
- June 28, 1908 (P)
- June 17, 1909 (P)
- April 28, 1911 (P)
- April 17, 1912 (P)
- August 21, 1914 (P)
- February 3, 1916 (P)
- June 8, 1918 (P)
- November 22, 1919 (P)
- November 10, 1920 (P)
- September 10, 1923 (P)
- January 24, 1925 (P)
- April 28, 1930 (P)
- August 31, 1932 (P)
- February 3, 1935 (P)
- April 19, 1939 (P)
- April 7, 1940 (P)
- July 9, 1945 (P)
- November 23, 1946 (P)
- November 12, 1947 (P)
- March 7, 1951 (P)
- September 1, 1951 (P)
- June 30, 1954 (T)
- April 30, 1957 (P)
- September 20, 1960 (P)
- July 20, 1963 (P)
- May 9, 1967 (P)
- September 11, 1969 (P)
- March 7, 1970 (P)
- July 10, 1972 (P)
- December 24, 1973 (P)
- December 13, 1974 (P)
- October 12, 1977 (P)
- February 26, 1979 (P)
- May 30, 1984 (P)
- October 3, 1986 (P)
- March 7, 1989 (P)
- July 11, 1991 (P)
- May 21, 1993 (P)
- May 10, 1994 (P)
- February 26, 1998 (P)
- December 25, 2000 (P)
- December 14, 2001 (P)
- June 10, 2002 (P)
- May 20, 2012 (P)
- October 23, 2014 (P)
- August 21, 2017 (T) †
- June 10, 2021 (P)
- October 14, 2023 (P)
- April 8, 2024 (P)
- August 12, 2026 (P)
- → January 26, 2028 (P)
- January 14, 2029 (P)
- November 14, 2031 (P)
- March 30, 2033 (P)
- June 21, 2039 (P)
- November 4, 2040 (P)
- August 22, 2044 (P)
- August 12, 2045 (P)
- June 11, 2048 (A)
- March 30, 2052 (P)
- January 27, 2055 (P)
- January 16, 2056 (P)
- July 12, 2056 (P)
- July 1, 2057 (P)
- June 22, 2066 (P)
- June 11, 2067 (P)
- December 6, 2067 (P)
- November 24, 2068 (P)
- September 23, 2071 (P)
- November 15, 2077 (P)
- May 11, 2078 (P)
- May 1, 2079 (P)
- February 16, 2083 (P)
- July 3, 2084 (P)
- September 23, 2090 (P)
- February 7, 2092 (P)
- July 23, 2093 (P)
- December 7, 2094 (P)
- May 11, 2097 (P)
- September 25, 2098 (P)
- September 14, 2099 (T) †
- March 10, 2100 (P)

== Kansas ==
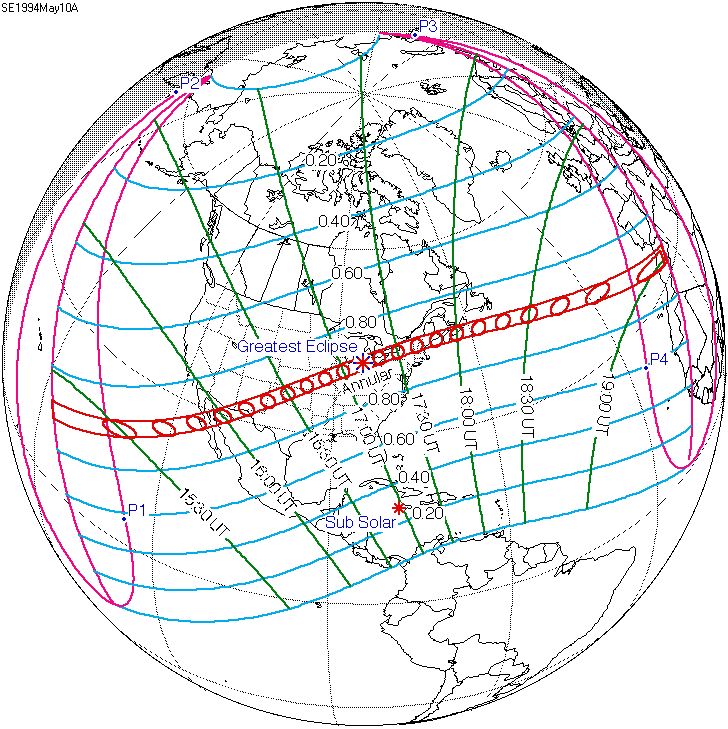
The path of the most recent annular solar eclipse to cross Kansas on May 10, 1994

From 1900 to 2100, the state of Kansas will have recorded a total of 88 solar eclipses, two of which are annular eclipses and three of which are total eclipses. One annular solar eclipse occurred on May 10, 1994, and the other will occur on June 11, 2048. Two total solar eclipses occurred on June 8, 1918 and August 21, 2017, and the other will occur on August 12, 2045.

The most recent total solar eclipse in Kansas was on August 21, 2017; the most recent annular solar eclipse was on May 10, 1994; and the most recent partial solar eclipse was on April 8, 2024. The next total solar eclipse in Kansas will occur on August 12, 2045; the next annular solar eclipse will occur on June 11, 2048; and the next partial solar eclipse will occur on January 26, 2028.

- August 30, 1905 (P)
- January 3, 1908 (P)
- June 28, 1908 (P)
- June 17, 1909 (P)
- April 28, 1911 (P)
- February 3, 1916 (P)
- June 8, 1918 (T)
- November 22, 1919 (P)
- November 10, 1920 (P)
- September 10, 1923 (P)
- January 24, 1925 (P)
- July 9, 1926 (P)
- April 28, 1930 (P)
- August 31, 1932 (P)
- February 3, 1935 (P)
- April 19, 1939 (P)
- April 7, 1940 (P)
- July 9, 1945 (P)
- November 23, 1946 (P)
- November 12, 1947 (P)
- March 7, 1951 (P)
- September 1, 1951 (P)
- June 30, 1954 (P)
- April 30, 1957 (P)
- September 20, 1960 (P)
- July 20, 1963 (P)
- May 9, 1967 (P)
- September 11, 1969 (P)
- March 7, 1970 (P)
- July 10, 1972 (P)
- December 24, 1973 (P)
- December 13, 1974 (P)
- October 12, 1977 (P)
- February 26, 1979 (P)
- May 30, 1984 (P)
- October 3, 1986 (P)
- March 7, 1989 (P)
- July 11, 1991 (P)
- January 4, 1992 (P) †
- May 21, 1993 (P)
- May 10, 1994 (A)
- February 26, 1998 (P)
- December 25, 2000 (P)
- December 14, 2001 (P)
- June 10, 2002 (P)
- April 8, 2005 (P)
- May 20, 2012 (P)
- October 23, 2014 (P)
- August 21, 2017 (T)
- October 14, 2023 (P)
- April 8, 2024 (P)
- → January 26, 2028 (P)
- January 14, 2029 (P)
- November 14, 2031 (P)
- March 30, 2033 (P)
- July 2, 2038 (P) †
- June 21, 2039 (P)
- November 4, 2040 (P)
- August 22, 2044 (P)
- August 12, 2045 (T)
- February 5, 2046 (P)
- June 11, 2048 (A)
- March 30, 2052 (P)
- September 2, 2054 (P)
- January 27, 2055 (P)
- January 16, 2056 (P)
- July 12, 2056 (P)
- July 1, 2057 (P)
- June 22, 2066 (P)
- June 11, 2067 (P)
- December 6, 2067 (P)
- November 24, 2068 (P)
- September 23, 2071 (P)
- November 15, 2077 (P)
- May 11, 2078 (P)
- February 27, 2082 (P) †
- February 16, 2083 (P)
- July 3, 2084 (P)
- December 16, 2085 (P)
- September 23, 2090 (P)
- February 7, 2092 (P)
- July 23, 2093 (P)
- December 7, 2094 (P)
- May 11, 2097 (P)
- September 25, 2098 (P)
- March 21, 2099 (P)
- September 14, 2099 (P)
- March 10, 2100 (P)

== Kentucky ==
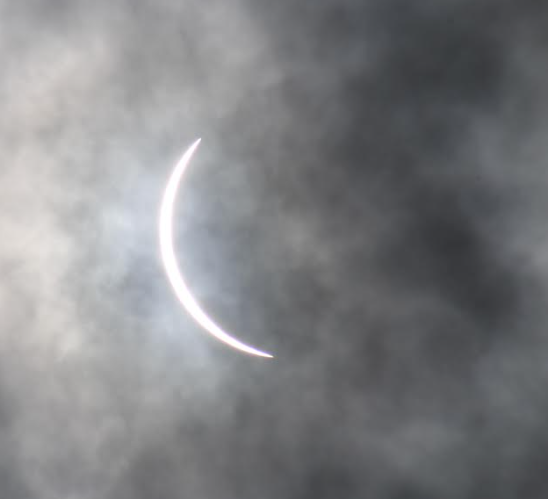
A view of the solar eclipse on April 8, 2024 from Lexington, Kentucky, during its partial phase

From 1900 to 2100, the state of Kentucky will have recorded a total of 85 solar eclipses, one of which is an annular eclipse and two of which are total eclipses. The one annular solar eclipse will occur on Solar eclipse of July 23, 2093. Two total solar eclipses occurred on August 21, 2017 and April 8, 2024.

The most recent total solar eclipse in Kentucky was on April 8, 2024, and the most recent partial solar eclipse was on August 12, 2026. The next annular solar eclipse will occur on July 23, 2093; and the next partial solar eclipse will occur on January 26, 2028.

- August 30, 1905 (P)
- January 3, 1908 (P)
- June 28, 1908 (P)
- June 17, 1909 (P)
- April 28, 1911 (P)
- April 17, 1912 (P)
- August 21, 1914 (P)
- February 3, 1916 (P)
- June 8, 1918 (P)
- November 22, 1919 (P)
- November 10, 1920 (P)
- September 10, 1923 (P)
- January 24, 1925 (P)
- July 9, 1926 (P) †
- April 28, 1930 (P)
- August 31, 1932 (P)
- February 3, 1935 (P)
- April 19, 1939 (P)
- April 7, 1940 (P)
- July 9, 1945 (P)
- November 23, 1946 (P)
- November 12, 1947 (P)
- March 7, 1951 (P)
- September 1, 1951 (P)
- June 30, 1954 (P)
- October 2, 1959 (P)
- September 20, 1960 (P)
- July 20, 1963 (P)
- May 9, 1967 (P)
- September 11, 1969 (P)
- March 7, 1970 (P)
- July 10, 1972 (P)
- December 24, 1973 (P)
- December 13, 1974 (P)
- October 12, 1977 (P)
- February 26, 1979 (P)
- May 30, 1984 (P)
- October 3, 1986 (P)
- July 11, 1991 (P)
- May 10, 1994 (P)
- February 26, 1998 (P)
- December 25, 2000 (P)
- December 14, 2001 (P)
- June 10, 2002 (P)
- April 8, 2005 (P)
- May 20, 2012 (P)
- November 3, 2013 (P)
- October 23, 2014 (P)
- August 21, 2017 (T)
- June 10, 2021 (P)
- October 14, 2023 (P)
- April 8, 2024 (T)
- August 12, 2026 (P) †
- → January 26, 2028 (P)
- January 14, 2029 (P)
- November 14, 2031 (P)
- March 30, 2033 (P)
- January 5, 2038 (P)
- July 2, 2038 (P)
- June 21, 2039 (P)
- November 4, 2040 (P)
- August 12, 2045 (P)
- June 11, 2048 (P)
- November 14, 2050 (P)
- March 30, 2052 (P)
- January 27, 2055 (P)
- January 16, 2056 (P)
- July 12, 2056 (P)
- July 1, 2057 (P)
- June 22, 2066 (P)
- June 11, 2067 (P)
- December 6, 2067 (P)
- November 24, 2068 (P)
- September 23, 2071 (P)
- November 15, 2077 (P)
- May 11, 2078 (P)
- May 1, 2079 (P)
- February 27, 2082 (P)
- February 16, 2083 (P)
- September 23, 2090 (P)
- February 7, 2092 (P)
- July 23, 2093 (A) †
- December 7, 2094 (P)
- September 14, 2099 (P)
- March 10, 2100 (P)

== Louisiana ==
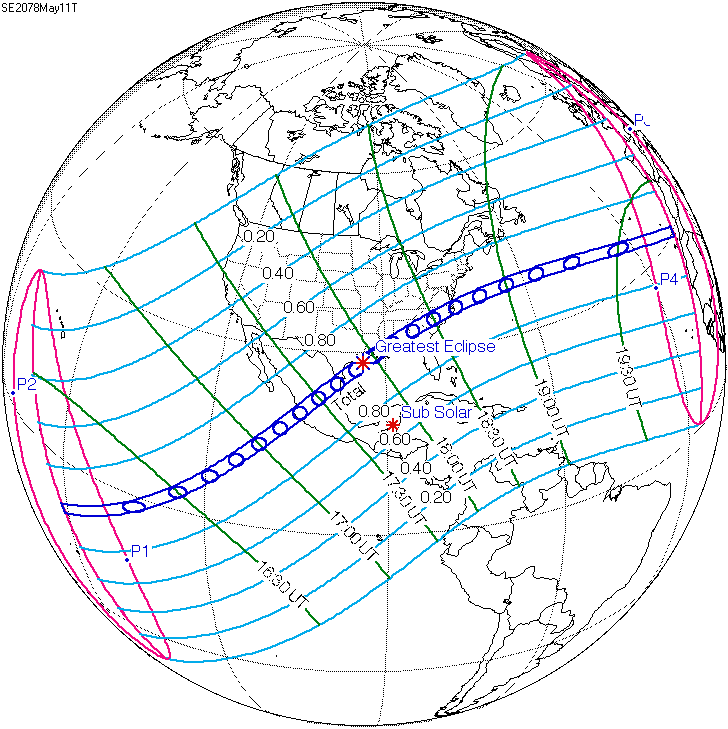
The path of the total solar eclipse that will cross Louisiana on May 11, 2078

From 1900 to 2100, the state of Louisiana will have recorded a total of 84 solar eclipses, three of which are annular eclipses and four of which are total eclipses. The three annular solar eclipses occurred on November 22, 1919; April 7, 1940; and May 30, 1984. One total solar eclipse occurred on June 8, 1918, and the remaining three will occur on August 12, 2045; March 30, 2052; and May 11, 2078.

The most recent total solar eclipse in Louisiana was on June 8, 1918; the most recent annular solar eclipse was on May 30, 1984; and the most recent partial solar eclipse was on April 8, 2024. The next total solar eclipse in Louisiana will occur on August 12, 2045, and the next partial solar eclipse will occur on January 26, 2028.

- August 30, 1905 (P)
- January 3, 1908 (P)
- June 28, 1908 (P)
- June 17, 1909 (P)
- April 28, 1911 (P)
- October 10, 1912 (P)
- February 3, 1916 (P)
- June 8, 1918 (T)
- November 22, 1919 (A)
- March 28, 1922 (P) †
- September 10, 1923 (P)
- January 24, 1925 (P)
- July 9, 1926 (P)
- April 28, 1930 (P)
- August 31, 1932 (P)
- February 3, 1935 (P)
- June 8, 1937 (P)
- April 19, 1939 (P)
- April 7, 1940 (A)
- January 25, 1944 (P)
- July 9, 1945 (P)
- November 23, 1946 (P)
- November 12, 1947 (P)
- March 7, 1951 (P)
- September 1, 1951 (P)
- June 30, 1954 (P)
- September 20, 1960 (P)
- July 20, 1963 (P)
- November 12, 1966 (P)
- May 9, 1967 (P)
- September 11, 1969 (P)
- March 7, 1970 (P)
- July 10, 1972 (P)
- December 24, 1973 (P)
- December 13, 1974 (P)
- October 12, 1977 (P)
- February 26, 1979 (P)
- August 10, 1980 (P)
- May 30, 1984 (A)
- October 3, 1986 (P)
- July 11, 1991 (P)
- May 10, 1994 (P)
- February 26, 1998 (P)
- December 25, 2000 (P)
- December 14, 2001 (P)
- June 10, 2002 (P)
- April 8, 2005 (P)
- May 20, 2012 (P)
- October 23, 2014 (P)
- August 21, 2017 (P)
- October 14, 2023 (P)
- April 8, 2024 (P)
- → January 26, 2028 (P)
- January 14, 2029 (P)
- November 14, 2031 (P)
- March 30, 2033 (P)
- January 5, 2038 (P)
- July 2, 2038 (P)
- November 4, 2040 (P)
- August 12, 2045 (T)
- June 11, 2048 (P)
- May 31, 2049 (P) †
- March 30, 2052 (T)
- January 27, 2055 (P)
- January 16, 2056 (P)
- July 12, 2056 (P)
- July 1, 2057 (P)
- June 22, 2066 (P)
- June 11, 2067 (P)
- December 6, 2067 (P)
- November 24, 2068 (P)
- September 23, 2071 (P)
- November 15, 2077 (P)
- May 11, 2078 (T)
- February 27, 2082 (P)
- February 16, 2083 (P)
- December 16, 2085 (P) †
- September 23, 2090 (P)
- February 7, 2092 (P)
- July 23, 2093 (P)
- December 7, 2094 (P)
- March 21, 2099 (P)
- September 14, 2099 (P)
- March 10, 2100 (P)

== Maine ==
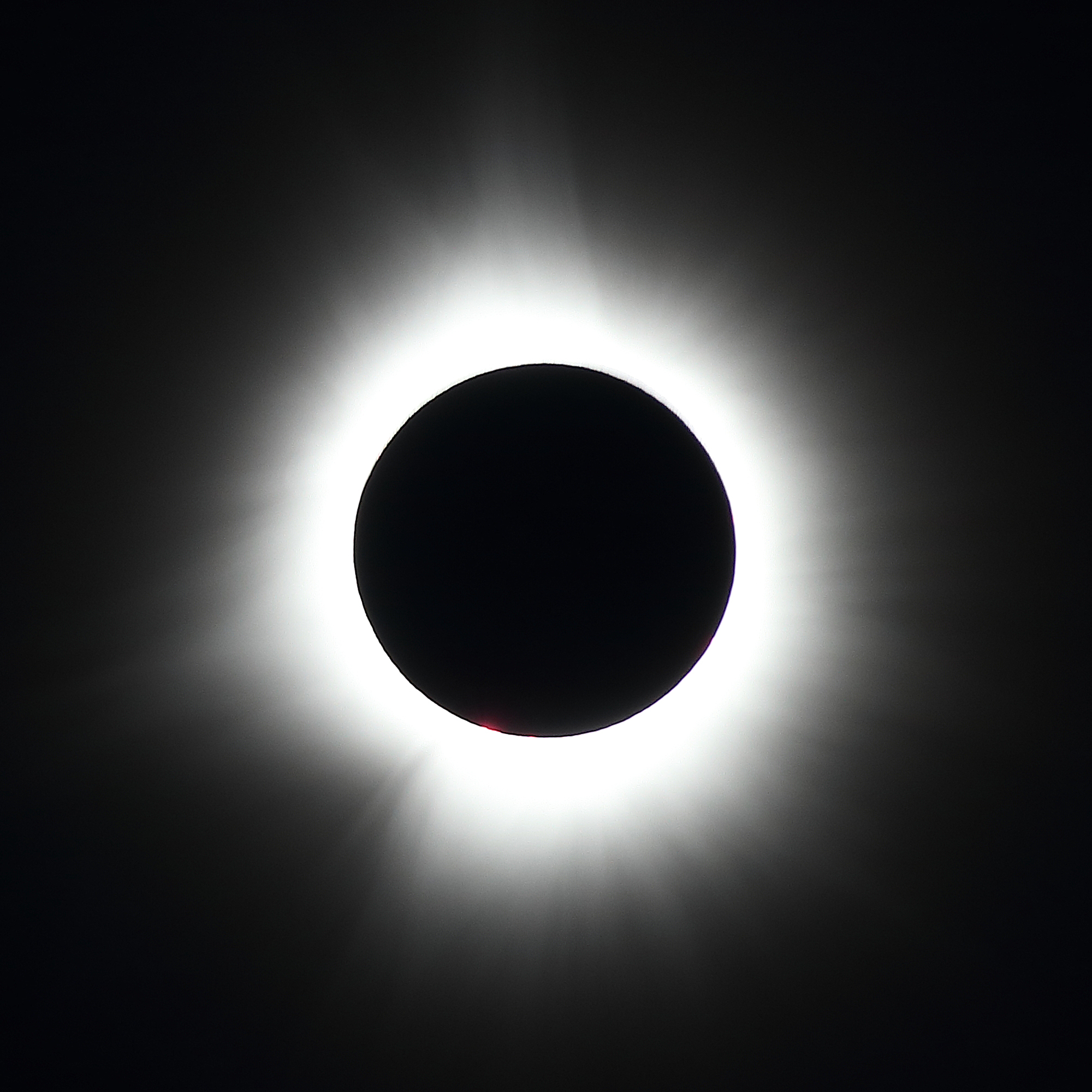
A view of the solar eclipse on April 8, 2024 from Jackman, Maine, during totality

From 1900 to 2100, the state of Maine will have recorded a total of 81 solar eclipses, two of which are annular eclipses and four of which are total eclipses. One annular solar eclipse occurred on May 10, 1994, and the other will occur on July 23, 2093. Three total solar eclipses occurred on August 31, 1932; July 20, 1963; and April 8, 2024, and the remaining one will occur on May 1, 2079.

The most recent total solar eclipse in Maine was on April 8, 2024; the most recent annular solar eclipse was on May 10, 1994; and the most recent partial solar eclipse was on August 12, 2026. The next total solar eclipse in Maine will occur on May 1, 2079; the next annular solar eclipse will occur on July 23, 2093; and the next partial solar eclipse will occur on January 26, 2028.

- August 30, 1905 (P)
- June 28, 1908 (P)
- June 17, 1909 (P)
- April 17, 1912 (P)
- August 21, 1914 (P)
- February 3, 1916 (P)
- June 8, 1918 (P)
- November 22, 1919 (P)
- November 10, 1920 (P)
- September 10, 1923 (P)
- January 24, 1925 (P)
- November 1, 1929 (P)
- April 28, 1930 (P)
- August 31, 1932 (T)
- February 3, 1935 (P)
- April 19, 1939 (P)
- April 7, 1940 (P)
- July 9, 1945 (P)
- November 23, 1946 (P)
- November 12, 1947 (P) †
- March 7, 1951 (P)
- September 1, 1951 (P)
- June 30, 1954 (P)
- October 2, 1959 (P)
- July 20, 1963 (T)
- May 9, 1967 (P)
- March 7, 1970 (P)
- July 10, 1972 (P)
- December 24, 1973 (P)
- December 13, 1974 (P)
- April 29, 1976 (P)
- October 12, 1977 (P)
- February 26, 1979 (P)
- December 4, 1983 (P)
- May 30, 1984 (P)
- October 3, 1986 (P)
- May 10, 1994 (A)
- October 12, 1996 (P)
- February 26, 1998 (P)
- August 11, 1999 (P)
- December 25, 2000 (P)
- August 1, 2008 (P)
- June 1, 2011 (P) †
- November 3, 2013 (P)
- October 23, 2014 (P)
- August 21, 2017 (P)
- June 10, 2021 (P)
- October 14, 2023 (P)
- April 8, 2024 (T)
- March 29, 2025 (P)
- August 12, 2026 (P)
- → January 26, 2028 (P)
- January 14, 2029 (P)
- March 30, 2033 (P)
- August 21, 2036 (P)
- January 5, 2038 (P)
- July 2, 2038 (P)
- June 21, 2039 (P)
- November 4, 2040 (P)
- August 12, 2045 (P)
- June 11, 2048 (P)
- November 14, 2050 (P)
- March 30, 2052 (P)
- January 27, 2055 (P)
- July 1, 2057 (P)
- June 22, 2066 (P)
- December 6, 2067 (P)
- April 21, 2069 (P)
- September 23, 2071 (P)
- November 15, 2077 (P)
- May 11, 2078 (P)
- May 1, 2079 (T)
- September 13, 2080 (P)
- February 27, 2082 (P)
- February 16, 2083 (P)
- April 21, 2088 (P)
- September 23, 2090 (P)
- February 7, 2092 (P)
- July 23, 2093 (A)
- December 7, 2094 (P)
- September 14, 2099 (P)

== Maryland ==
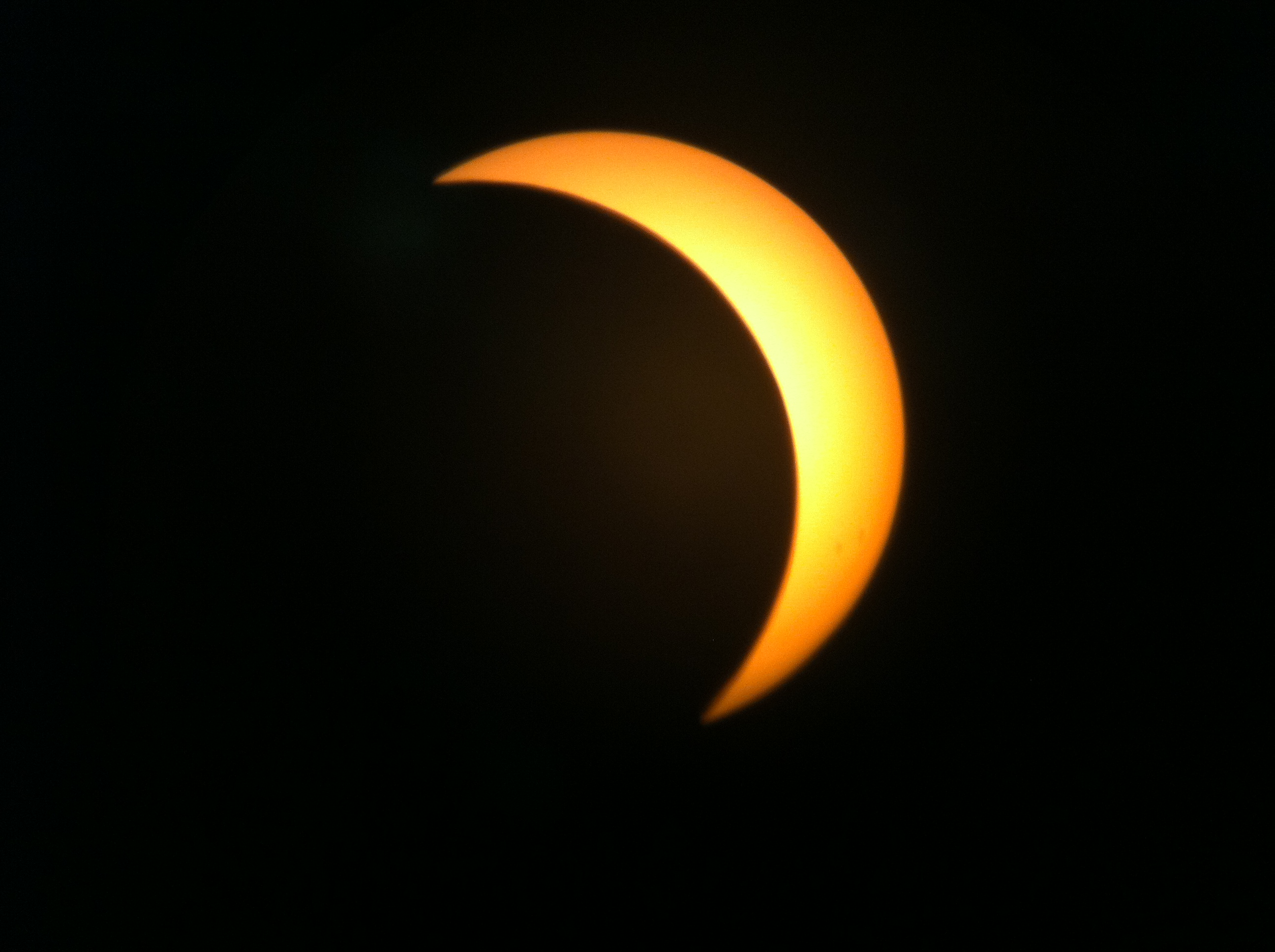
A view of the solar eclipse on August 21, 2017 from Ellicott City, Maryland, during its partial phase

From 1900 to 2100, the state of Maryland will have recorded a total of 83 solar eclipses, one of which is an annular eclipse and three of which are total eclipses. The one annular solar eclipse occurred on May 30, 1984. One total solar eclipse occurred on March 7, 1970, and the remaining two will occur on May 1, 2079 and September 14, 2099.

The most recent total solar eclipse in Maryland was on March 7, 1970; the most recent annular solar eclipse was on May 30, 1984; and the most recent partial solar eclipse was on August 12, 2026. The next total solar eclipse in Maryland will occur on May 1, 2079, and the next partial solar eclipse will occur on January 26, 2028.

- August 30, 1905 (P)
- June 28, 1908 (P)
- June 17, 1909 (P)
- April 28, 1911 (P)
- April 17, 1912 (P)
- August 21, 1914 (P)
- February 3, 1916 (P)
- June 8, 1918 (P)
- November 22, 1919 (P)
- November 10, 1920 (P)
- September 10, 1923 (P)
- January 24, 1925 (P)
- April 28, 1930 (P)
- August 31, 1932 (P)
- February 3, 1935 (P)
- April 19, 1939 (P)
- April 7, 1940 (P)
- July 9, 1945 (P)
- November 23, 1946 (P)
- November 12, 1947 (P)
- March 7, 1951 (P)
- September 1, 1951 (P)
- June 30, 1954 (P)
- October 2, 1959 (P)
- September 20, 1960 (P)
- July 20, 1963 (P)
- May 9, 1967 (P)
- March 7, 1970 (T) †
- July 10, 1972 (P)
- December 24, 1973 (P)
- December 13, 1974 (P)
- October 12, 1977 (P)
- February 26, 1979 (P)
- May 30, 1984 (A) †
- October 3, 1986 (P)
- July 11, 1991 (P)
- May 10, 1994 (P)
- February 26, 1998 (P)
- August 11, 1999 (P)
- December 25, 2000 (P)
- December 14, 2001 (P)
- June 10, 2002 (P)
- April 8, 2005 (P)
- May 20, 2012 (P)
- November 3, 2013 (P)
- October 23, 2014 (P)
- August 21, 2017 (P)
- June 10, 2021 (P)
- October 14, 2023 (P)
- April 8, 2024 (P)
- March 29, 2025 (P)
- August 12, 2026 (P)
- → January 26, 2028 (P)
- January 14, 2029 (P)
- November 14, 2031 (P)
- March 30, 2033 (P)
- January 5, 2038 (P)
- July 2, 2038 (P)
- June 21, 2039 (P)
- November 4, 2040 (P)
- August 12, 2045 (P)
- June 11, 2048 (P)
- November 14, 2050 (P)
- March 30, 2052 (P)
- January 27, 2055 (P)
- July 12, 2056 (P)
- July 1, 2057 (P)
- June 22, 2066 (P)
- June 11, 2067 (P)
- December 6, 2067 (P)
- November 24, 2068 (P)
- September 23, 2071 (P)
- November 15, 2077 (P)
- May 11, 2078 (P)
- May 1, 2079 (T)
- February 27, 2082 (P)
- February 16, 2083 (P)
- September 23, 2090 (P)
- February 7, 2092 (P)
- July 23, 2093 (P)
- December 7, 2094 (P)
- September 14, 2099 (T)
- March 10, 2100 (P) †

== Massachusetts ==
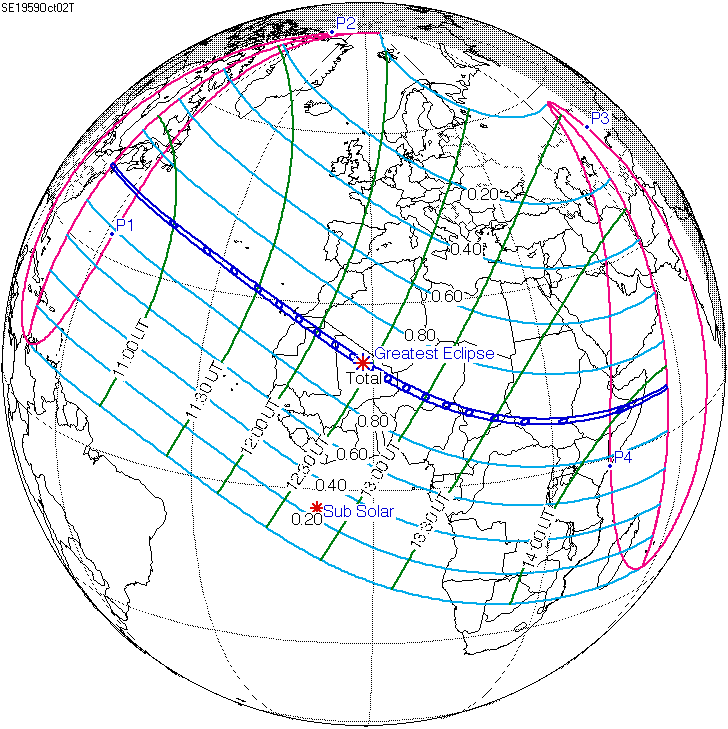
The path of the total solar eclipse that crossed Massachusetts on October 2, 1959

From 1900 to 2100, the state of Massachusetts will have recorded a total of 78 solar eclipses, one of which is an annular eclipse and five of which are total eclipses. The one annular solar eclipse occurred on May 10, 1994. Four of the total solar eclipses occurred on January 24, 1925; August 31, 1932; October 2, 1959; and March 7, 1970, respectively, and the remaining one will occur on May 1, 2079.

The most recent total solar eclipse in Massachusetts was on March 7, 1970; the most recent annular solar eclipse was on May 10, 1994; and the most recent partial solar eclipse was on August 12, 2026. The next total solar eclipse in Massachusetts will occur on May 1, 2079, and the next partial solar eclipse will occur on January 26, 2028.

- August 30, 1905 (P)
- June 28, 1908 (P)
- June 17, 1909 (P)
- April 17, 1912 (P)
- August 21, 1914 (P)
- February 3, 1916 (P)
- June 8, 1918 (P)
- November 22, 1919 (P)
- November 10, 1920 (P)
- September 10, 1923 (P)
- January 24, 1925 (T)
- November 1, 1929 (P)
- April 28, 1930 (P)
- August 31, 1932 (T)
- February 3, 1935 (P)
- April 19, 1939 (P)
- April 7, 1940 (P)
- July 9, 1945 (P)
- November 23, 1946 (P)
- November 12, 1947 (P)
- March 7, 1951 (P)
- September 1, 1951 (P)
- June 30, 1954 (P)
- October 2, 1959 (T)
- July 20, 1963 (P)
- May 9, 1967 (P)
- March 7, 1970 (T) †
- July 10, 1972 (P)
- December 24, 1973 (P)
- December 13, 1974 (P)
- April 29, 1976 (P)
- October 12, 1977 (P)
- February 26, 1979 (P)
- December 4, 1983 (P) †
- May 30, 1984 (P)
- October 3, 1986 (P)
- July 11, 1991 (P)
- May 10, 1994 (A) †
- February 26, 1998 (P)
- August 11, 1999 (P)
- December 25, 2000 (P)
- December 14, 2001 (P)
- November 3, 2013 (P)
- October 23, 2014 (P)
- August 21, 2017 (P)
- June 10, 2021 (P)
- October 14, 2023 (P)
- April 8, 2024 (P)
- March 29, 2025 (P)
- August 12, 2026 (P)
- → January 26, 2028 (P)
- January 14, 2029 (P)
- March 30, 2033 (P)
- January 5, 2038 (P)
- July 2, 2038 (P)
- June 21, 2039 (P)
- November 4, 2040 (P)
- August 12, 2045 (P)
- June 11, 2048 (P)
- November 14, 2050 (P)
- March 30, 2052 (P)
- January 27, 2055 (P)
- July 1, 2057 (P)
- June 22, 2066 (P)
- December 6, 2067 (P)
- April 21, 2069 (P)
- September 23, 2071 (P)
- November 15, 2077 (P)
- May 11, 2078 (P)
- May 1, 2079 (T)
- February 27, 2082 (P)
- February 16, 2083 (P)
- April 21, 2088 (P)
- September 23, 2090 (P)
- February 7, 2092 (P)
- July 23, 2093 (P)
- December 7, 2094 (P)
- September 14, 2099 (P)

== Michigan ==
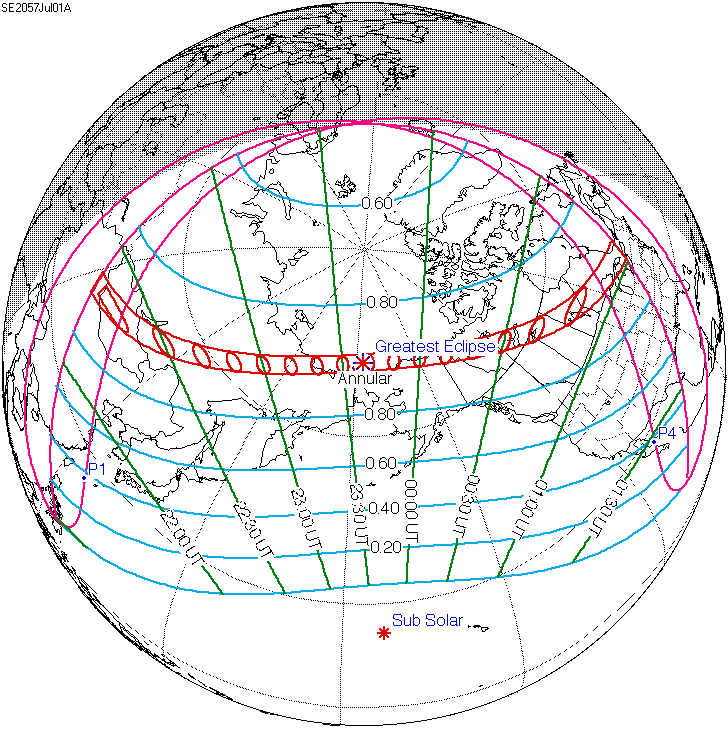
The path of the annular solar eclipse that will cross Michigan on July 1, 2057

From 1900 to 2100, the state of Michigan will have recorded a total of 87 solar eclipses, four of which are annular eclipses and four of which are total eclipses. One annular solar eclipse occurred on May 10, 1994, and the remaining three will occur on June 11, 2048; July 1, 2057; and July 23, 2093. Three of the total solar eclipses occurred on January 24, 1925; June 30, 1954; and April 8, 2024, respectively, and the remaining one will occur on September 14, 2099.

The most recent total solar eclipse in Michigan was on April 8, 2024; the most recent annular solar eclipse was on May 10, 1994; and the most recent partial solar eclipse was on August 12, 2026. The next total solar eclipse in Michigan will occur on September 14, 2099; the next annular solar eclipse will occur on June 11, 2048; and the next partial solar eclipse will occur on January 26, 2028.

- August 30, 1905 (P)
- June 28, 1908 (P)
- June 17, 1909 (P)
- April 28, 1911 (P)
- April 17, 1912 (P)
- August 21, 1914 (P)
- February 3, 1916 (P)
- June 8, 1918 (P)
- November 22, 1919 (P)
- November 10, 1920 (P)
- September 10, 1923 (P)
- January 24, 1925 (T)
- April 28, 1930 (P)
- August 31, 1932 (P)
- February 3, 1935 (P)
- April 19, 1939 (P)
- April 7, 1940 (P)
- July 9, 1945 (P)
- November 23, 1946 (P)
- November 12, 1947 (P)
- March 7, 1951 (P)
- September 1, 1951 (P)
- June 30, 1954 (T)
- April 30, 1957 (P)
- October 2, 1959 (P)
- September 20, 1960 (P)
- July 20, 1963 (P)
- May 9, 1967 (P)
- September 11, 1969 (P)
- March 7, 1970 (P)
- July 10, 1972 (P)
- December 24, 1973 (P)
- December 13, 1974 (P)
- October 12, 1977 (P)
- February 26, 1979 (P)
- May 30, 1984 (P)
- October 3, 1986 (P)
- March 7, 1989 (P)
- July 11, 1991 (P)
- May 21, 1993 (P)
- May 10, 1994 (A)
- February 26, 1998 (P)
- December 25, 2000 (P)
- December 14, 2001 (P)
- June 10, 2002 (P)
- May 20, 2012 (P)
- November 3, 2013 (P) †
- October 23, 2014 (P)
- August 21, 2017 (P)
- June 10, 2021 (P)
- October 14, 2023 (P)
- April 8, 2024 (T) †
- August 12, 2026 (P)
- → January 26, 2028 (P)
- January 14, 2029 (P)
- November 14, 2031 (P)
- March 30, 2033 (P)
- January 5, 2038 (P)
- July 2, 2038 (P)
- June 21, 2039 (P)
- November 4, 2040 (P)
- August 22, 2044 (P)
- August 12, 2045 (P)
- June 11, 2048 (A)
- November 14, 2050 (P)
- March 30, 2052 (P)
- January 27, 2055 (P)
- July 12, 2056 (P)
- July 1, 2057 (A)
- June 22, 2066 (P)
- June 11, 2067 (P)
- December 6, 2067 (P)
- November 24, 2068 (P)
- September 23, 2071 (P)
- November 15, 2077 (P)
- May 11, 2078 (P)
- May 1, 2079 (P)
- February 27, 2082 (P) †
- February 16, 2083 (P)
- July 3, 2084 (P)
- September 23, 2090 (P)
- February 7, 2092 (P)
- July 23, 2093 (A)
- December 7, 2094 (P)
- May 11, 2097 (P)
- September 14, 2099 (T)
- March 10, 2100 (P)

== Minnesota ==
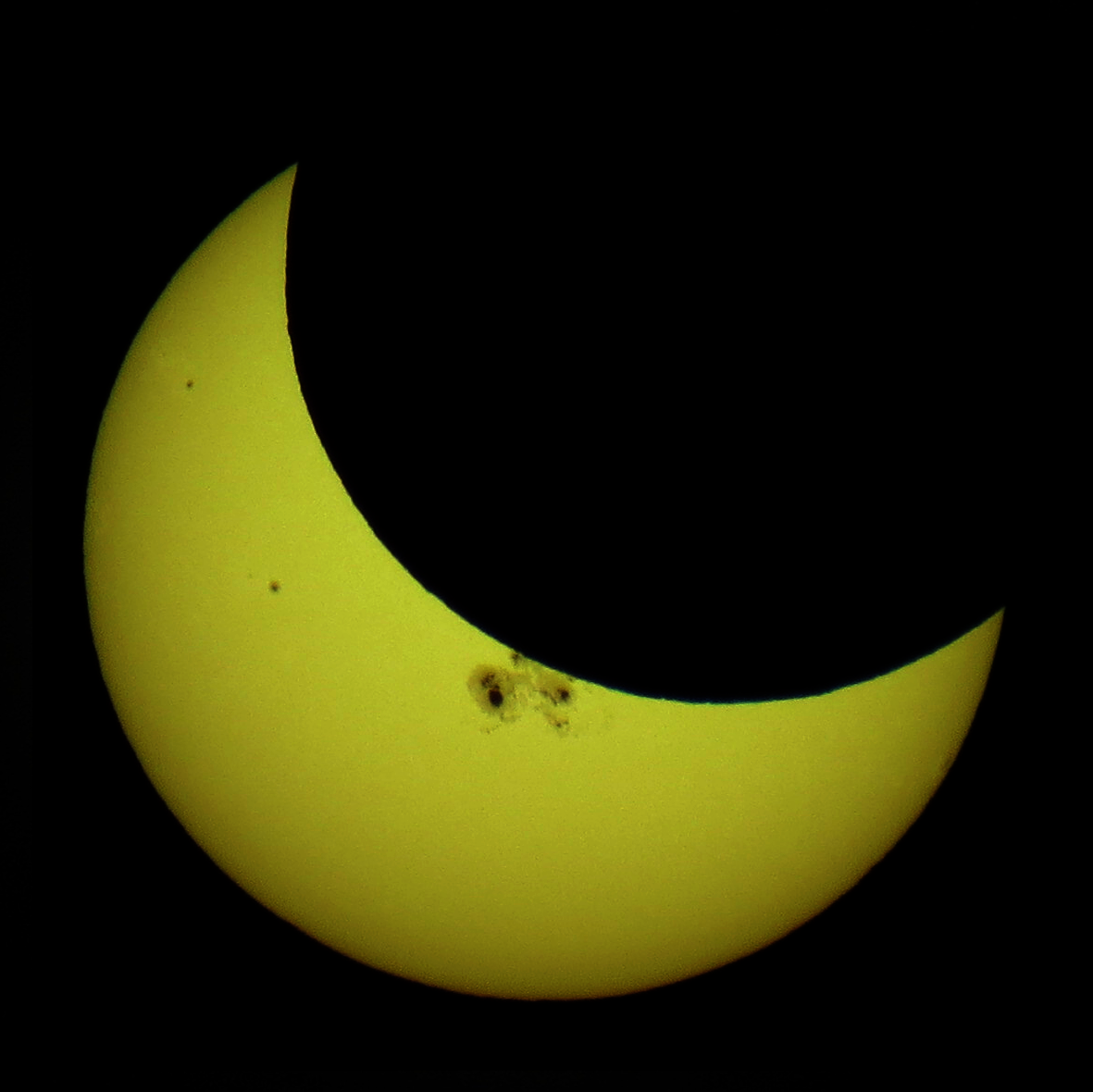
A view of the solar eclipse on October 23, 2014 from Minneapolis, Minnesota, during its partial phase

From 1900 to 2100, the state of Minnesota will have recorded a total of 85 solar eclipses, three of which are annular eclipses and three of which are total eclipses. The three annular solar eclipses will occur on June 11, 2048; July 1, 2057; and March 10, 2100. Two of the total solar eclipses occurred on January 24, 1925 and June 30, 1954, respectively, and the remaining one will occur on September 14, 2099.

The most recent total solar eclipse in Minnesota was on June 30, 1954, and the most recent partial solar eclipse was on August 12, 2026. The next total solar eclipse in Minnesota will occur on September 14, 2099; the next annular solar eclipse will occur on June 11, 2048; and the next partial solar eclipse will occur on January 26, 2028.

- August 30, 1905 (P)
- August 20, 1906 (P)
- June 28, 1908 (P)
- June 17, 1909 (P)
- April 28, 1911 (P)
- April 17, 1912 (P)
- August 21, 1914 (P)
- February 3, 1916 (P)
- June 8, 1918 (P)
- November 22, 1919 (P)
- November 10, 1920 (P)
- September 10, 1923 (P)
- January 24, 1925 (T)
- April 28, 1930 (P)
- August 31, 1932 (P)
- February 3, 1935 (P)
- April 19, 1939 (P)
- April 7, 1940 (P)
- July 9, 1945 (P)
- November 23, 1946 (P)
- November 12, 1947 (P)
- March 7, 1951 (P) †
- September 1, 1951 (P)
- June 30, 1954 (T)
- April 30, 1957 (P)
- September 20, 1960 (P)
- July 20, 1963 (P)
- May 9, 1967 (P)
- September 11, 1969 (P)
- March 7, 1970 (P)
- July 10, 1972 (P)
- December 24, 1973 (P)
- December 13, 1974 (P)
- October 12, 1977 (P)
- February 26, 1979 (P)
- May 30, 1984 (P)
- October 3, 1986 (P)
- March 7, 1989 (P)
- July 11, 1991 (P)
- May 21, 1993 (P)
- May 10, 1994 (P)
- February 26, 1998 (P)
- December 25, 2000 (P)
- December 14, 2001 (P)
- June 10, 2002 (P)
- May 20, 2012 (P)
- October 23, 2014 (P)
- August 21, 2017 (P)
- June 10, 2021 (P)
- October 14, 2023 (P)
- April 8, 2024 (P)
- August 12, 2026 (P)
- → January 26, 2028 (P)
- January 14, 2029 (P)
- November 14, 2031 (P)
- March 30, 2033 (P)
- June 21, 2039 (P)
- November 4, 2040 (P)
- April 9, 2043 (P)
- August 22, 2044 (P)
- August 12, 2045 (P)
- June 11, 2048 (A)
- March 30, 2052 (P)
- September 2, 2054 (P)
- January 27, 2055 (P)
- January 16, 2056 (P)
- July 12, 2056 (P)
- July 1, 2057 (A)
- June 22, 2066 (P)
- June 11, 2067 (P)
- November 24, 2068 (P)
- September 23, 2071 (P)
- November 15, 2077 (P)
- May 11, 2078 (P)
- May 1, 2079 (P)
- February 16, 2083 (P)
- July 3, 2084 (P)
- September 23, 2090 (P)
- February 7, 2092 (P)
- July 23, 2093 (P)
- December 7, 2094 (P)
- May 11, 2097 (P)
- September 25, 2098 (P)
- September 14, 2099 (T)
- March 10, 2100 (A)

== Mississippi ==
An animation of the most recent total solar eclipse to cross Mississippi on June 8, 1918

From 1900 to 2100, the state of Mississippi will have recorded a total of 83 solar eclipses, two of which are annular eclipses and three of which are total eclipses. The two annular solar eclipses occurred on April 7, 1940 and May 30, 1984. One of the total solar eclipses occurred on June 8, 1918, and the remaining two will occur on August 12, 2045 and May 11, 2078.

The most recent total solar eclipse in Mississippi was on June 8, 1918; the most recent annular solar eclipse was on May 30, 1984; and the most recent partial solar eclipse was on April 8, 2024. The next total solar eclipse in Mississippi will occur on August 12, 2045, and the next partial solar eclipse will occur on January 26, 2028.

- August 30, 1905 (P)
- January 3, 1908 (P)
- June 28, 1908 (P)
- June 17, 1909 (P)
- April 28, 1911 (P)
- April 17, 1912 (P)
- October 10, 1912 (P)
- February 3, 1916 (P)
- June 8, 1918 (T)
- November 22, 1919 (P)
- November 10, 1920 (P)
- September 10, 1923 (P)
- January 24, 1925 (P)
- July 9, 1926 (P)
- April 28, 1930 (P)
- August 31, 1932 (P)
- February 3, 1935 (P)
- June 8, 1937 (P)
- April 19, 1939 (P)
- April 7, 1940 (A)
- January 25, 1944 (P)
- July 9, 1945 (P)
- November 23, 1946 (P)
- November 12, 1947 (P)
- March 7, 1951 (P)
- September 1, 1951 (P)
- June 30, 1954 (P)
- September 20, 1960 (P)
- July 20, 1963 (P)
- November 12, 1966 (P)
- May 9, 1967 (P)
- September 11, 1969 (P)
- March 7, 1970 (P)
- July 10, 1972 (P)
- December 24, 1973 (P)
- December 13, 1974 (P)
- October 12, 1977 (P)
- February 26, 1979 (P)
- August 10, 1980 (P)
- May 30, 1984 (A)
- October 3, 1986 (P)
- July 11, 1991 (P)
- May 10, 1994 (P)
- February 26, 1998 (P)
- December 25, 2000 (P)
- December 14, 2001 (P)
- June 10, 2002 (P)
- April 8, 2005 (P)
- May 20, 2012 (P)
- October 23, 2014 (P)
- August 21, 2017 (P)
- October 14, 2023 (P)
- April 8, 2024 (P)
- → January 26, 2028 (P)
- January 14, 2029 (P)
- November 14, 2031 (P)
- March 30, 2033 (P)
- January 5, 2038 (P)
- July 2, 2038 (P)
- November 4, 2040 (P)
- August 12, 2045 (T)
- June 11, 2048 (P)
- March 30, 2052 (P)
- January 27, 2055 (P)
- January 16, 2056 (P)
- July 12, 2056 (P)
- July 1, 2057 (P)
- June 22, 2066 (P)
- June 11, 2067 (P)
- December 6, 2067 (P)
- November 24, 2068 (P)
- September 23, 2071 (P)
- November 15, 2077 (P)
- May 11, 2078 (T)
- February 27, 2082 (P)
- February 16, 2083 (P)
- September 23, 2090 (P)
- February 7, 2092 (P)
- July 23, 2093 (P)
- December 7, 2094 (P)
- March 21, 2099 (P)
- September 14, 2099 (P)
- March 10, 2100 (P)

== Missouri ==
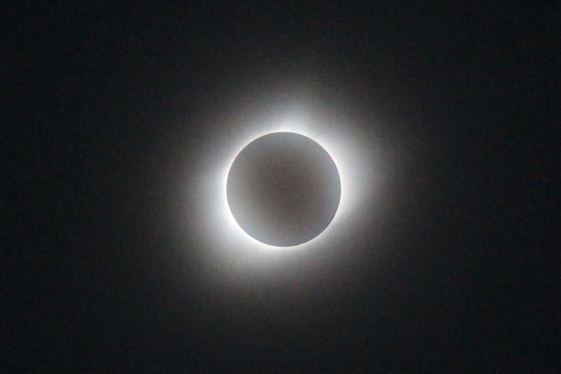
A view of the solar eclipse on August 21, 2017 from Columbia, Missouri, during totality

From 1900 to 2100, the state of Missouri will have recorded a total of 85 solar eclipses, three of which are annular eclipses and three of which are total eclipses. One annular solar eclipse occurred on May 10, 1994, and the other two will occur on June 11, 2048 and July 23, 2093. Two total solar eclipses occurred on August 21, 2017 and April 8, 2024.

The most recent total solar eclipse in Missouri was on April 8, 2024; the most recent annular solar eclipse was on May 10, 1994; and the most recent partial solar eclipse was on October 14, 2023 (not counting April 8). The next total solar eclipse in Missouri will occur on August 12, 2045; the next annular solar eclipse will occur on June 11, 2048; and the next partial solar eclipse will occur on January 26, 2028.

- August 30, 1905 (P)
- January 3, 1908 (P)
- June 28, 1908 (P)
- June 17, 1909 (P)
- April 28, 1911 (P)
- April 17, 1912 (P)
- February 3, 1916 (P)
- June 8, 1918 (P)
- November 22, 1919 (P)
- November 10, 1920 (P)
- September 10, 1923 (P)
- January 24, 1925 (P)
- July 9, 1926 (P)
- April 28, 1930 (P)
- August 31, 1932 (P)
- February 3, 1935 (P)
- April 19, 1939 (P)
- April 7, 1940 (P)
- July 9, 1945 (P)
- November 23, 1946 (P)
- November 12, 1947 (P)
- March 7, 1951 (P)
- September 1, 1951 (P)
- June 30, 1954 (P)
- September 20, 1960 (P)
- July 20, 1963 (P)
- May 9, 1967 (P)
- September 11, 1969 (P)
- March 7, 1970 (P)
- July 10, 1972 (P)
- December 24, 1973 (P)
- December 13, 1974 (P)
- October 12, 1977 (P)
- February 26, 1979 (P)
- May 30, 1984 (P)
- October 3, 1986 (P)
- March 7, 1989 (P)
- July 11, 1991 (P)
- May 21, 1993 (P)
- May 10, 1994 (A)
- February 26, 1998 (P)
- December 25, 2000 (P)
- December 14, 2001 (P)
- June 10, 2002 (P)
- April 8, 2005 (P)
- May 20, 2012 (P)
- October 23, 2014 (P)
- August 21, 2017 (T)
- June 10, 2021 (P)
- October 14, 2023 (P)
- April 8, 2024 (T)
- → January 26, 2028 (P)
- January 14, 2029 (P)
- November 14, 2031 (P)
- March 30, 2033 (P)
- January 5, 2038 (P)
- July 2, 2038 (P)
- June 21, 2039 (P)
- November 4, 2040 (P)
- August 22, 2044 (P)
- August 12, 2045 (T) †
- June 11, 2048 (A)
- March 30, 2052 (P)
- January 27, 2055 (P)
- January 16, 2056 (P)
- July 12, 2056 (P)
- July 1, 2057 (P)
- June 22, 2066 (P)
- June 11, 2067 (P)
- December 6, 2067 (P)
- November 24, 2068 (P)
- September 23, 2071 (P)
- November 15, 2077 (P)
- May 11, 2078 (P)
- February 27, 2082 (P)
- February 16, 2083 (P)
- July 3, 2084 (P)
- September 23, 2090 (P)
- February 7, 2092 (P)
- July 23, 2093 (A) †
- December 7, 2094 (P)
- September 25, 2098 (P) †
- March 21, 2099 (P)
- September 14, 2099 (P)
- March 10, 2100 (P)

== Montana ==
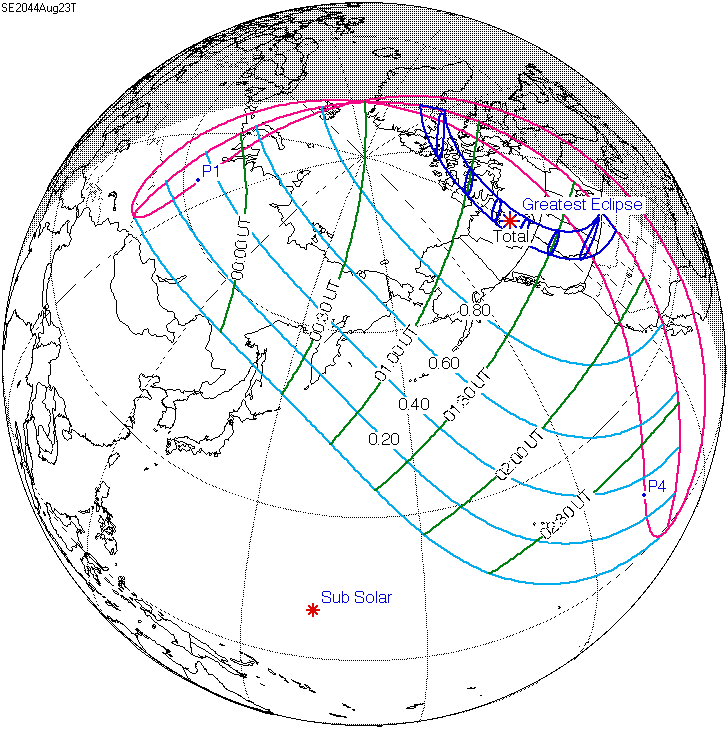
The path of the next total solar eclipse to cross Montana on August 23, 2044

From 1900 to 2100, the state of Montana will have recorded a total of 93 solar eclipses, one of which is an annular eclipse, and five of which are total eclipses, and one of which is a hybrid eclipse. The one annular solar eclipse will occur on March 10, 2100. Three of the total solar eclipses occurred on July 9, 1945; February 26, 1979; and August 21, 2017, and the remaining two will occur on August 23, 2044 and September 14, 2099. The lone hybrid eclipse, of which both its total and annular eclipse portions passed over Montana, occurred on April 28, 1930.

The most recent total solar eclipse in Montana was on August 21, 2017, and the most recent partial solar eclipse was on August 12, 2026. The next total solar eclipse in Montana will occur on August 22, 2044 (local time); the next annular solar eclipse will occur on March 10, 2100; and the next partial solar eclipse will occur on January 26, 2028.

- August 30, 1905 (P)
- August 20, 1906 (P)
- June 28, 1908 (P)
- June 17, 1909 (P)
- April 28, 1911 (P)
- April 6, 1913 (P)
- February 3, 1916 (P)
- June 19, 1917 (P)
- June 8, 1918 (P)
- November 22, 1919 (P)
- November 10, 1920 (P)
- September 10, 1923 (P)
- January 24, 1925 (P)
- July 9, 1926 (P)
- April 28, 1930 (H)
- August 31, 1932 (P)
- February 3, 1935 (P)
- December 2, 1937 (P)
- November 21, 1938 (P)
- April 19, 1939 (P)
- April 7, 1940 (P)
- February 4, 1943 (P)
- July 9, 1945 (T)
- November 23, 1946 (P)
- November 12, 1947 (P)
- May 9, 1948 (P)
- July 11, 1953 (P)
- June 30, 1954 (P)
- April 30, 1957 (P)
- September 20, 1960 (P)
- July 20, 1963 (P)
- May 9, 1967 (P)
- September 11, 1969 (P)
- March 7, 1970 (P)
- July 10, 1972 (P)
- December 24, 1973 (P)
- December 13, 1974 (P)
- October 12, 1977 (P)
- February 26, 1979 (T)
- May 30, 1984 (P)
- October 3, 1986 (P)
- March 7, 1989 (P)
- July 22, 1990 (P)
- July 11, 1991 (P)
- January 4, 1992 (P)
- May 21, 1993 (P)
- May 10, 1994 (P)
- July 31, 2000 (P)
- December 25, 2000 (P)
- December 14, 2001 (P)
- June 10, 2002 (P)
- May 20, 2012 (P)
- October 23, 2014 (P)
- August 21, 2017 (T) †
- October 14, 2023 (P)
- April 8, 2024 (P)
- August 12, 2026 (P)
- → January 26, 2028 (P)
- January 14, 2029 (P)
- March 30, 2033 (P)
- June 21, 2039 (P)
- November 4, 2040 (P)
- April 9, 2043 (P)
- August 22, 2044 (T)
- August 12, 2045 (P)
- February 5, 2046 (P)
- June 11, 2048 (P)
- March 30, 2052 (P)
- September 2, 2054 (P)
- January 27, 2055 (P)
- January 16, 2056 (P)
- July 12, 2056 (P)
- July 1, 2057 (P)
- June 22, 2066 (P)
- June 11, 2067 (P)
- November 24, 2068 (P)
- September 23, 2071 (P)
- November 15, 2077 (P)
- May 11, 2078 (P)
- February 16, 2083 (P)
- July 3, 2084 (P)
- December 16, 2085 (P)
- May 2, 2087 (P)
- September 23, 2090 (P)
- February 7, 2092 (P)
- July 23, 2093 (P)
- July 12, 2094 (P)
- December 7, 2094 (P)
- May 22, 2096 (P)
- May 11, 2097 (P)
- September 25, 2098 (P)
- September 14, 2099 (T)
- March 10, 2100 (A)

== Nebraska ==
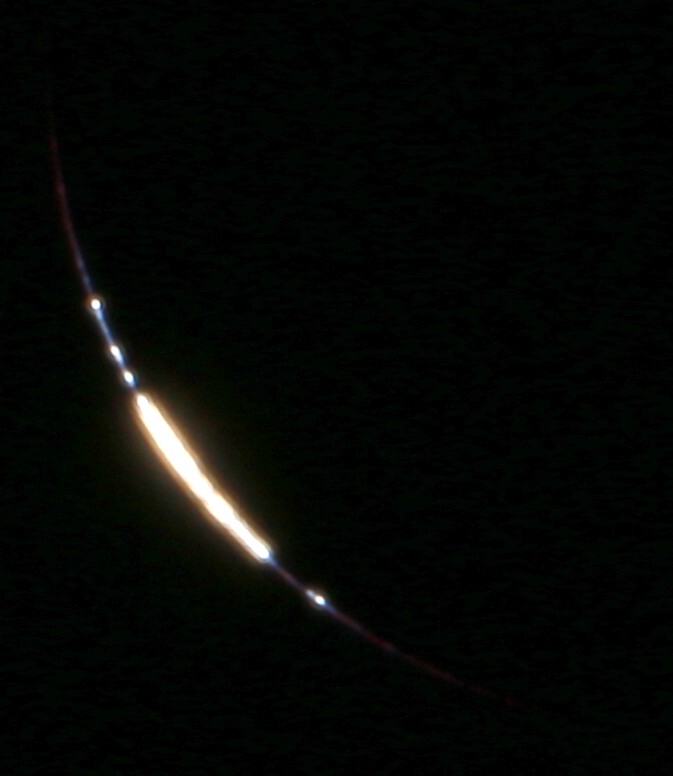
A view of the solar eclipse on August 21, 2017 from far western Nebraska, displaying Baily's Beads as it enters totality

From 1900 to 2100, the state of Nebraska will have recorded a total of 84 solar eclipses, one of which is an annular eclipse and two of which are total eclipses. The one annular solar eclipse will occur on June 11, 2048. Both total solar eclipses occurred on June 30, 1954 and August 21, 2017, respectively.

The most recent total solar eclipse in Nebraska was on August 21, 2017, and the most recent partial solar eclipse was on April 8, 2024. The next annular solar eclipse will occur on June 11, 2048, and the next partial solar eclipse will occur on January 26, 2028.

- August 30, 1905 (P)
- August 20, 1906 (P) †
- January 3, 1908 (P)
- June 28, 1908 (P)
- June 17, 1909 (P)
- April 28, 1911 (P)
- February 3, 1916 (P)
- June 8, 1918 (P)
- November 22, 1919 (P)
- November 10, 1920 (P)
- September 10, 1923 (P)
- January 24, 1925 (P)
- July 9, 1926 (P)
- April 28, 1930 (P)
- August 31, 1932 (P)
- February 3, 1935 (P)
- April 19, 1939 (P)
- April 7, 1940 (P)
- July 9, 1945 (P)
- November 23, 1946 (P)
- November 12, 1947 (P)
- March 7, 1951 (P)
- September 1, 1951 (P)
- June 30, 1954 (T)
- April 30, 1957 (P)
- September 20, 1960 (P)
- July 20, 1963 (P)
- May 9, 1967 (P)
- September 11, 1969 (P)
- March 7, 1970 (P)
- July 10, 1972 (P)
- December 24, 1973 (P)
- December 13, 1974 (P)
- October 12, 1977 (P)
- February 26, 1979 (P)
- May 30, 1984 (P)
- October 3, 1986 (P)
- March 7, 1989 (P)
- July 11, 1991 (P)
- January 4, 1992 (P) †
- May 21, 1993 (P)
- May 10, 1994 (P)
- February 26, 1998 (P) †
- December 25, 2000 (P)
- December 14, 2001 (P)
- June 10, 2002 (P)
- May 20, 2012 (P)
- October 23, 2014 (P)
- August 21, 2017 (T)
- October 14, 2023 (P)
- April 8, 2024 (P)
- → January 26, 2028 (P)
- January 14, 2029 (P)
- November 14, 2031 (P)
- March 30, 2033 (P)
- June 21, 2039 (P)
- November 4, 2040 (P)
- August 22, 2044 (P)
- August 12, 2045 (P)
- February 5, 2046 (P)
- June 11, 2048 (A)
- March 30, 2052 (P)
- September 2, 2054 (P)
- January 27, 2055 (P)
- January 16, 2056 (P)
- July 12, 2056 (P)
- July 1, 2057 (P)
- June 22, 2066 (P)
- June 11, 2067 (P)
- November 24, 2068 (P)
- September 23, 2071 (P)
- November 15, 2077 (P)
- May 11, 2078 (P)
- February 16, 2083 (P)
- July 3, 2084 (P)
- December 16, 2085 (P)
- September 23, 2090 (P)
- February 7, 2092 (P)
- July 23, 2093 (P)
- December 7, 2094 (P)
- May 11, 2097 (P)
- September 25, 2098 (P)
- September 14, 2099 (P)
- March 10, 2100 (P)

== Nevada ==
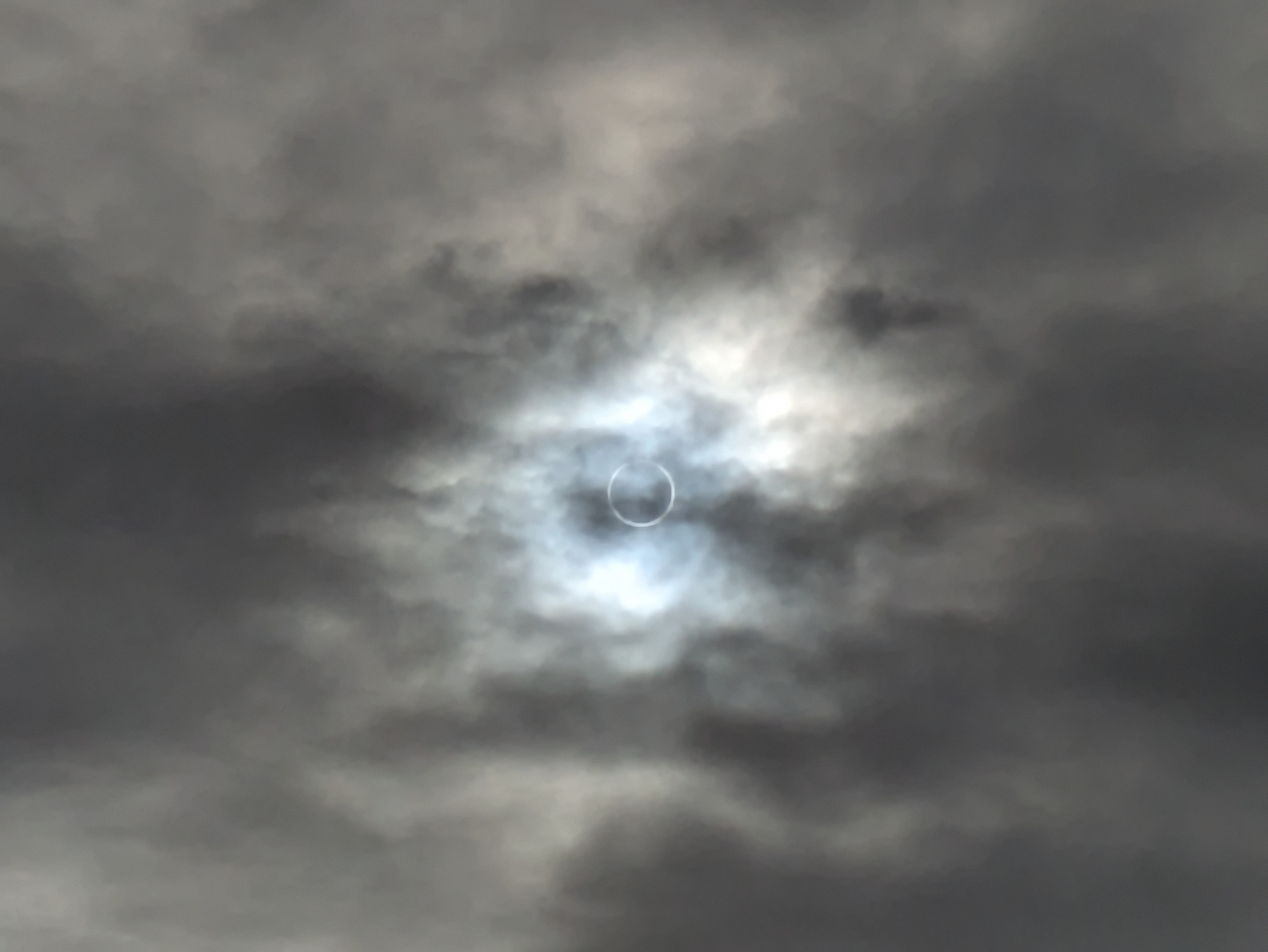
A view of the solar eclipse on October 14, 2023 from Winnemucca, Nevada, during annularity

From 1900 to 2100, the state of Nevada will have recorded a total of 90 solar eclipses, six of which are annular eclipses, one of which is a total eclipse, and one of which is a hybrid eclipse. Two of the annular solar eclipses occurred on May 20, 2012 and October 14, 2023, respectively, and the remaining four will occur on February 5, 2046; November 15, 2077; July 3, 2084; and March 10, 2100. The one total solar eclipse will occur on August 12, 2045. The lone hybrid eclipse, of which its total eclipse portion passed over Nevada, occurred on April 28, 1930.

The most recent annular solar eclipse was on October 14, 2023, and the most recent partial solar eclipse was on April 8, 2024. The next total solar eclipse in Nevada will occur on August 12, 2045; the next annular solar eclipse will occur on February 5, 2046; and the next partial solar eclipse will occur on January 26, 2028.

- August 20, 1906 (P)
- June 28, 1908 (P)
- June 17, 1909 (P)
- April 28, 1911 (P)
- April 6, 1913 (P)
- February 3, 1916 (P)
- June 8, 1918 (P)
- November 22, 1919 (P)
- September 10, 1923 (P)
- July 9, 1926 (P)
- April 28, 1930 (H)
- August 31, 1932 (P)
- February 14, 1934 (P)
- February 3, 1935 (P)
- June 8, 1937 (P)
- December 2, 1937 (P)
- November 21, 1938 (P)
- April 19, 1939 (P)
- April 7, 1940 (P)
- February 4, 1943 (P)
- July 9, 1945 (P)
- November 23, 1946 (P)
- November 12, 1947 (P)
- April 30, 1957 (P)
- September 20, 1960 (P)
- February 5, 1962 (P)
- July 20, 1963 (P)
- May 9, 1967 (P)
- September 11, 1969 (P)
- March 7, 1970 (P)
- July 10, 1972 (P)
- December 13, 1974 (P)
- October 12, 1977 (P)
- February 26, 1979 (P)
- August 10, 1980 (P)
- May 30, 1984 (P)
- October 3, 1986 (P)
- March 7, 1989 (P)
- July 22, 1990 (P)
- July 11, 1991 (P)
- January 4, 1992 (P)
- May 21, 1993 (P)
- May 10, 1994 (P)
- July 31, 2000 (P)
- December 25, 2000 (P)
- December 14, 2001 (P)
- June 10, 2002 (P)
- May 20, 2012 (A)
- October 23, 2014 (P)
- August 21, 2017 (P)
- October 14, 2023 (A)
- April 8, 2024 (P)
- → January 26, 2028 (P) †
- January 14, 2029 (P)
- November 14, 2031 (P)
- March 30, 2033 (P)
- September 2, 2035 (P)
- June 21, 2039 (P)
- November 4, 2040 (P)
- April 9, 2043 (P)
- August 22, 2044 (P)
- February 16, 2045 (P)
- August 12, 2045 (T)
- February 5, 2046 (A)
- June 11, 2048 (P)
- March 30, 2052 (P)
- September 2, 2054 (P)
- January 27, 2055 (P)
- January 16, 2056 (P)
- July 12, 2056 (P)
- July 1, 2057 (P)
- June 22, 2066 (P)
- June 11, 2067 (P)
- November 24, 2068 (P)
- September 23, 2071 (P)
- November 15, 2077 (A)
- May 11, 2078 (P)
- November 4, 2078 (P)
- February 16, 2083 (P)
- July 3, 2084 (A)
- December 16, 2085 (P)
- September 23, 2090 (P)
- February 7, 2092 (P)
- December 7, 2094 (P)
- May 22, 2096 (P)
- May 11, 2097 (P)
- September 25, 2098 (P)
- March 21, 2099 (P)
- September 14, 2099 (P)
- March 10, 2100 (A) †

== New Hampshire ==
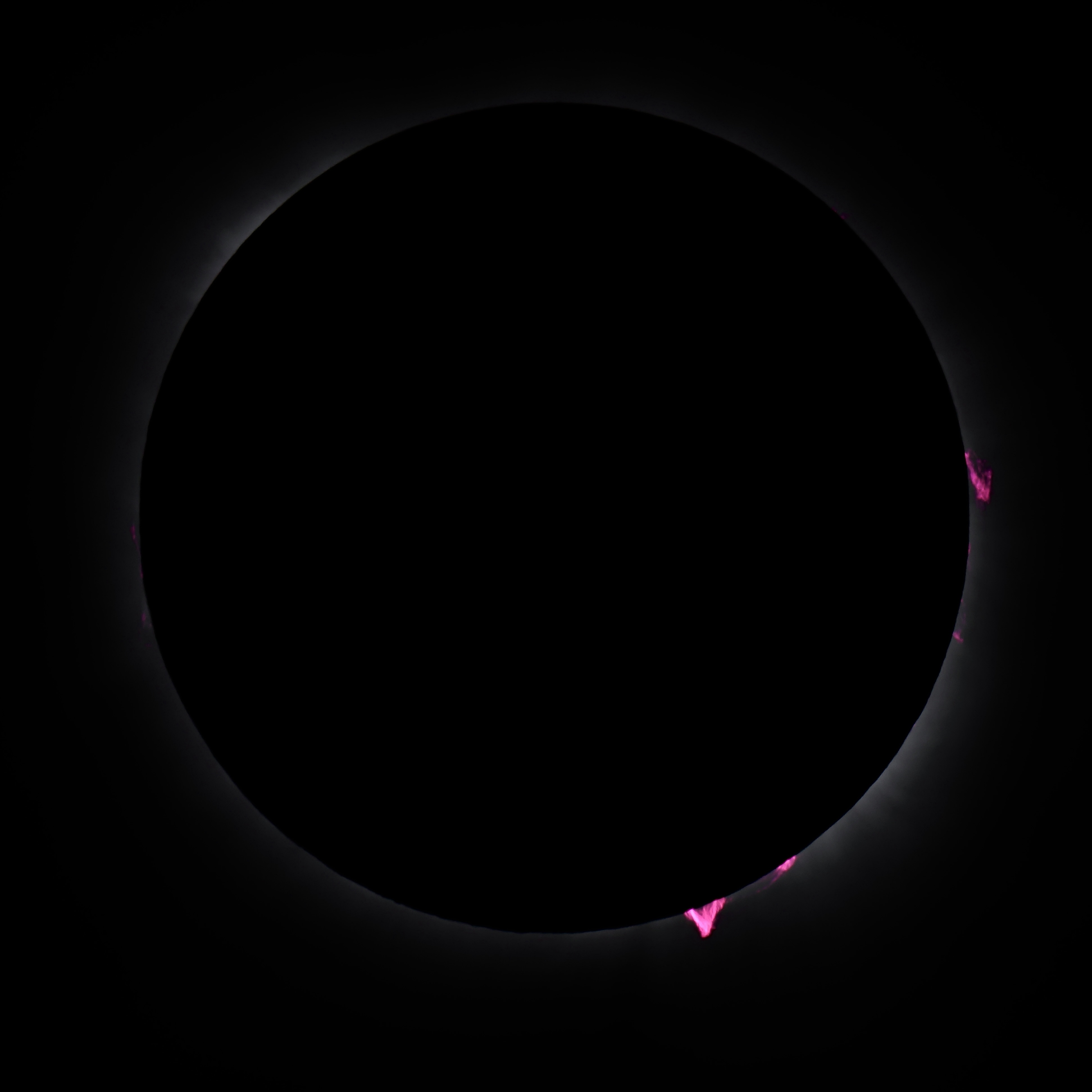
A view of the solar eclipse on April 8, 2024 from Third Connecticut Lake, New Hampshire, during totality. Note the many solar prominences ejecting from the sun.

From 1900 to 2100, the state of New Hampshire will have recorded a total of 78 solar eclipses, two of which are annular eclipses and four of which are total eclipses. One of the annular solar eclipses occurred on May 10, 1994, and the other will occur on July 23, 2093. Three of the total solar eclipses occurred on August 31, 1932; October 2, 1959; and April 8, 2024, and the remaining one will occur on May 1, 2079.

The most recent total solar eclipse in New Hampshire was on April 8, 2024; the most recent annular solar eclipse was on May 10, 1994; and the most recent partial solar eclipse was on August 12, 2026. The next total solar eclipse in New Hampshire will occur on May 1, 2079; the next annular solar eclipse will occur on July 23, 2093; and the next partial solar eclipse will occur on January 26, 2028.

- August 30, 1905 (P)
- June 28, 1908 (P)
- June 17, 1909 (P)
- April 17, 1912 (P)
- August 21, 1914 (P)
- February 3, 1916 (P)
- June 8, 1918 (P)
- November 22, 1919 (P)
- November 10, 1920 (P)
- September 10, 1923 (P)
- January 24, 1925 (P)
- November 1, 1929 (P)
- April 28, 1930 (P)
- August 31, 1932 (T)
- February 3, 1935 (P)
- April 19, 1939 (P)
- April 7, 1940 (P)
- July 9, 1945 (P)
- November 23, 1946 (P)
- November 12, 1947 (P) †
- March 7, 1951 (P)
- September 1, 1951 (P)
- June 30, 1954 (P)
- October 2, 1959 (T)
- July 20, 1963 (P)
- May 9, 1967 (P)
- March 7, 1970 (P)
- July 10, 1972 (P)
- December 24, 1973 (P)
- December 13, 1974 (P)
- April 29, 1976 (P)
- October 12, 1977 (P)
- February 26, 1979 (P)
- May 30, 1984 (P)
- October 3, 1986 (P)
- July 11, 1991 (P)
- May 10, 1994 (A)
- February 26, 1998 (P)
- August 11, 1999 (P)
- December 25, 2000 (P)
- December 14, 2001 (P) †
- November 3, 2013 (P)
- October 23, 2014 (P)
- August 21, 2017 (P)
- June 10, 2021 (P)
- October 14, 2023 (P)
- April 8, 2024 (T)
- March 29, 2025 (P)
- August 12, 2026 (P)
- → January 26, 2028 (P)
- January 14, 2029 (P)
- March 30, 2033 (P)
- August 21, 2036 (P)
- January 5, 2038 (P)
- July 2, 2038 (P)
- June 21, 2039 (P)
- November 4, 2040 (P)
- August 12, 2045 (P)
- June 11, 2048 (P)
- November 14, 2050 (P)
- March 30, 2052 (P)
- January 27, 2055 (P)
- July 1, 2057 (P)
- June 22, 2066 (P)
- December 6, 2067 (P)
- April 21, 2069 (P)
- September 23, 2071 (P)
- November 15, 2077 (P)
- May 11, 2078 (P)
- May 1, 2079 (T)
- February 27, 2082 (P)
- February 16, 2083 (P)
- April 21, 2088 (P)
- September 23, 2090 (P)
- February 7, 2092 (P)
- July 23, 2093 (A)
- December 7, 2094 (P)
- September 14, 2099 (P)

== New Jersey ==
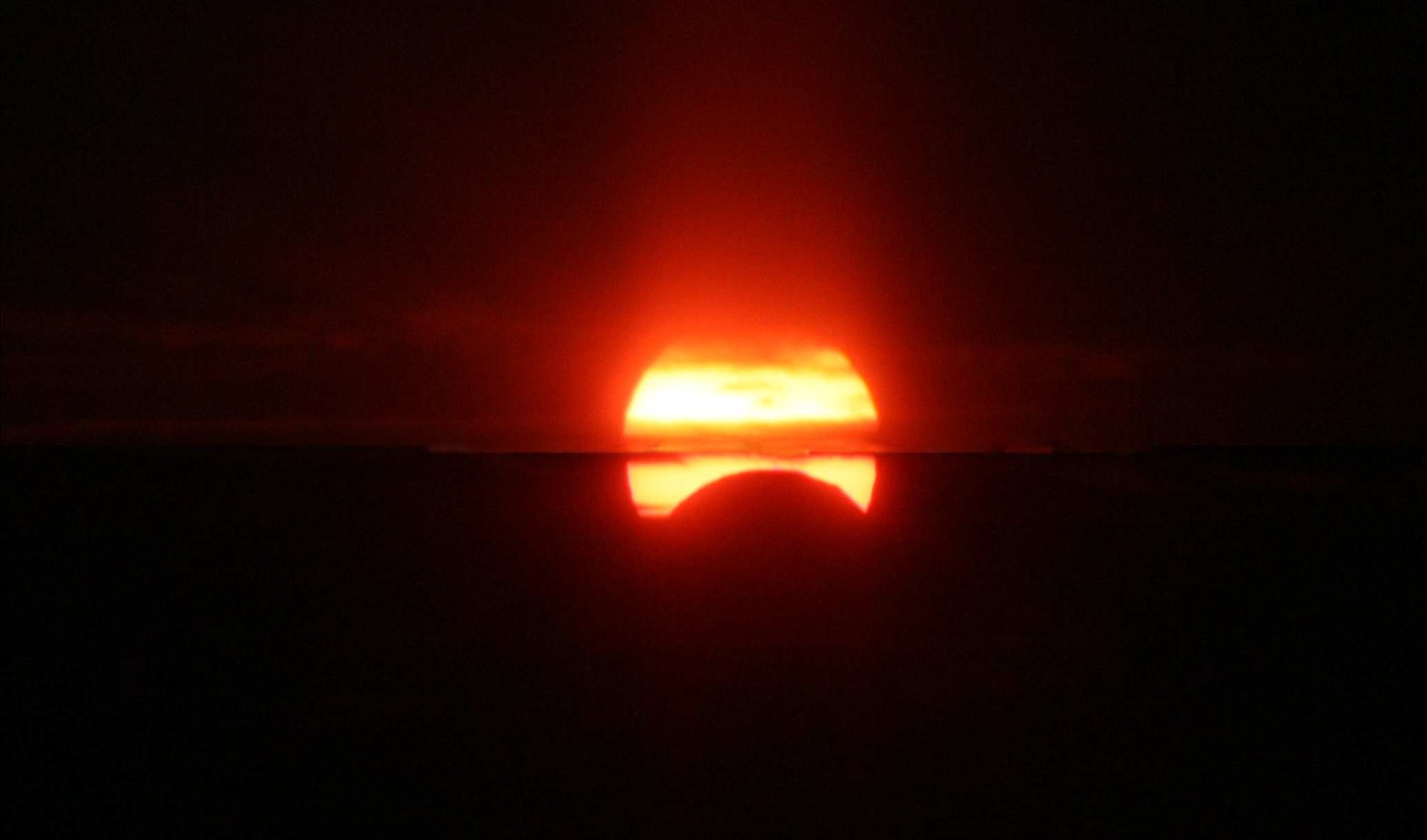
A view of the solar eclipse on November 3, 2013 from Liberty State Park, New Jersey, during its partial phase

From 1900 to 2100, the state of New Jersey will have recorded a total of 77 solar eclipses, two of which are total eclipses. One of the total solar eclipses occurred on January 24, 1925, and the remaining one will occur on May 1, 2079.

The most recent total solar eclipse in New Jersey was on January 24, 1925, and the most recent partial solar eclipse was on August 12, 2026. The next total solar eclipse in New Jersey will occur on May 1, 2079, and the next partial solar eclipse will occur on January 26, 2028.

- August 30, 1905 (P)
- June 28, 1908 (P)
- June 17, 1909 (P)
- April 28, 1911 (P) †
- April 17, 1912 (P)
- August 21, 1914 (P)
- February 3, 1916 (P)
- June 8, 1918 (P)
- November 22, 1919 (P)
- November 10, 1920 (P)
- September 10, 1923 (P)
- January 24, 1925 (T)
- April 28, 1930 (P)
- August 31, 1932 (P)
- February 3, 1935 (P)
- April 19, 1939 (P)
- April 7, 1940 (P)
- July 9, 1945 (P)
- November 23, 1946 (P)
- November 12, 1947 (P)
- March 7, 1951 (P)
- September 1, 1951 (P)
- June 30, 1954 (P)
- October 2, 1959 (P)
- July 20, 1963 (P)
- May 9, 1967 (P)
- March 7, 1970 (P)
- July 10, 1972 (P)
- December 24, 1973 (P)
- December 13, 1974 (P)
- October 12, 1977 (P)
- February 26, 1979 (P)
- May 30, 1984 (P)
- October 3, 1986 (P)
- July 11, 1991 (P)
- May 10, 1994 (P)
- February 26, 1998 (P)
- August 11, 1999 (P)
- December 25, 2000 (P)
- December 14, 2001 (P)
- April 8, 2005 (P)
- November 3, 2013 (P)
- October 23, 2014 (P)
- August 21, 2017 (P)
- June 10, 2021 (P)
- October 14, 2023 (P)
- April 8, 2024 (P)
- March 29, 2025 (P)
- August 12, 2026 (P)
- → January 26, 2028 (P)
- January 14, 2029 (P)
- November 14, 2031 (P)
- March 30, 2033 (P)
- January 5, 2038 (P)
- July 2, 2038 (P)
- June 21, 2039 (P)
- November 4, 2040 (P)
- August 12, 2045 (P)
- June 11, 2048 (P)
- November 14, 2050 (P)
- March 30, 2052 (P)
- January 27, 2055 (P)
- July 12, 2056 (P) †
- July 1, 2057 (P)
- June 22, 2066 (P)
- December 6, 2067 (P)
- September 23, 2071 (P)
- November 15, 2077 (P)
- May 11, 2078 (P)
- May 1, 2079 (T)
- February 27, 2082 (P)
- February 16, 2083 (P)
- September 23, 2090 (P)
- February 7, 2092 (P)
- July 23, 2093 (P)
- December 7, 2094 (P)
- September 14, 2099 (P)

== New Mexico ==
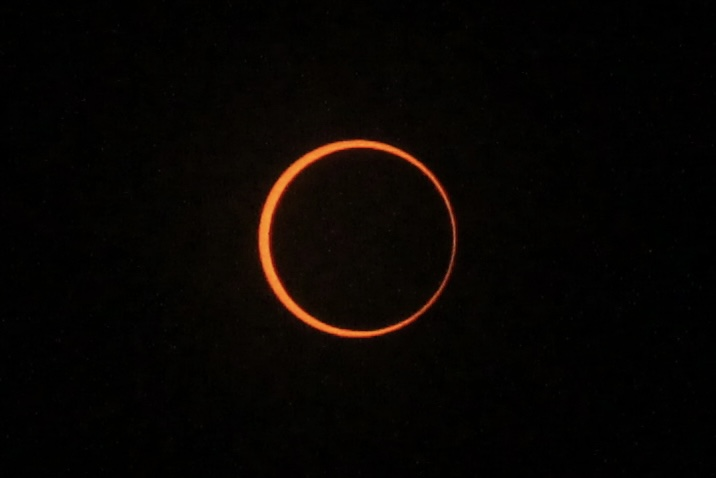
A view of the solar eclipse on October 14, 2023 from Los Alamos, New Mexico, during annularity

From 1900 to 2100, the state of New Mexico will have recorded a total of 90 solar eclipses, five of which are annular eclipses and one of which is a total eclipse. Four of the annular solar eclipses occurred on November 22, 1919; May 10, 1994; May 20, 2012; and October 14, 2023, respectively, and the remaining one will occur on November 15, 2077. The one total solar eclipse will occur on August 12, 2045.

The most recent annular solar eclipse was on October 14, 2023, and the most recent partial solar eclipse was on April 8, 2024. The next total solar eclipse in New Mexico will occur on August 12, 2045; the next annular solar eclipse will occur on November 15, 2077; and the next partial solar eclipse will occur on January 26, 2028.

- January 3, 1908 (P)
- June 28, 1908 (P)
- June 17, 1909 (P)
- April 28, 1911 (P)
- February 3, 1916 (P)
- June 8, 1918 (P)
- November 22, 1919 (A)
- September 10, 1923 (P)
- January 24, 1925 (P)
- July 9, 1926 (P)
- April 28, 1930 (P)
- August 31, 1932 (P)
- February 3, 1935 (P)
- June 8, 1937 (P)
- December 2, 1937 (P)
- April 19, 1939 (P)
- April 7, 1940 (P)
- February 4, 1943 (P)
- January 25, 1944 (P)
- July 9, 1945 (P)
- November 23, 1946 (P)
- November 12, 1947 (P)
- March 7, 1951 (P)
- June 30, 1954 (P)
- September 20, 1960 (P)
- July 20, 1963 (P)
- May 30, 1965 (P) †
- May 9, 1967 (P)
- September 11, 1969 (P)
- March 7, 1970 (P)
- July 10, 1972 (P)
- December 24, 1973 (P)
- December 13, 1974 (P)
- October 12, 1977 (P)
- February 26, 1979 (P)
- August 10, 1980 (P)
- May 30, 1984 (P)
- October 3, 1986 (P)
- March 7, 1989 (P)
- July 11, 1991 (P)
- January 4, 1992 (P)
- May 21, 1993 (P)
- May 10, 1994 (A)
- February 26, 1998 (P)
- December 25, 2000 (P)
- December 14, 2001 (P)
- June 10, 2002 (P)
- April 8, 2005 (P)
- May 20, 2012 (A)
- October 23, 2014 (P)
- August 21, 2017 (P)
- October 14, 2023 (A)
- April 8, 2024 (P)
- → January 26, 2028 (P)
- January 14, 2029 (P)
- November 14, 2031 (P)
- March 30, 2033 (P)
- July 2, 2038 (P)
- June 21, 2039 (P)
- November 4, 2040 (P)
- August 22, 2044 (P)
- August 12, 2045 (T) †
- February 5, 2046 (P)
- June 11, 2048 (P)
- March 30, 2052 (P)
- September 2, 2054 (P)
- January 27, 2055 (P)
- January 16, 2056 (P)
- July 12, 2056 (P)
- July 1, 2057 (P)
- June 22, 2066 (P)
- June 11, 2067 (P)
- November 24, 2068 (P)
- September 23, 2071 (P)
- November 15, 2077 (A)
- May 11, 2078 (P)
- November 4, 2078 (P)
- February 27, 2082 (P)
- February 16, 2083 (P)
- July 3, 2084 (P)
- December 16, 2085 (P)
- September 23, 2090 (P)
- February 7, 2092 (P)
- July 23, 2093 (P)
- December 7, 2094 (P)
- May 11, 2097 (P)
- September 25, 2098 (P)
- March 21, 2099 (P)
- September 14, 2099 (P)
- March 10, 2100 (P)

== New York ==
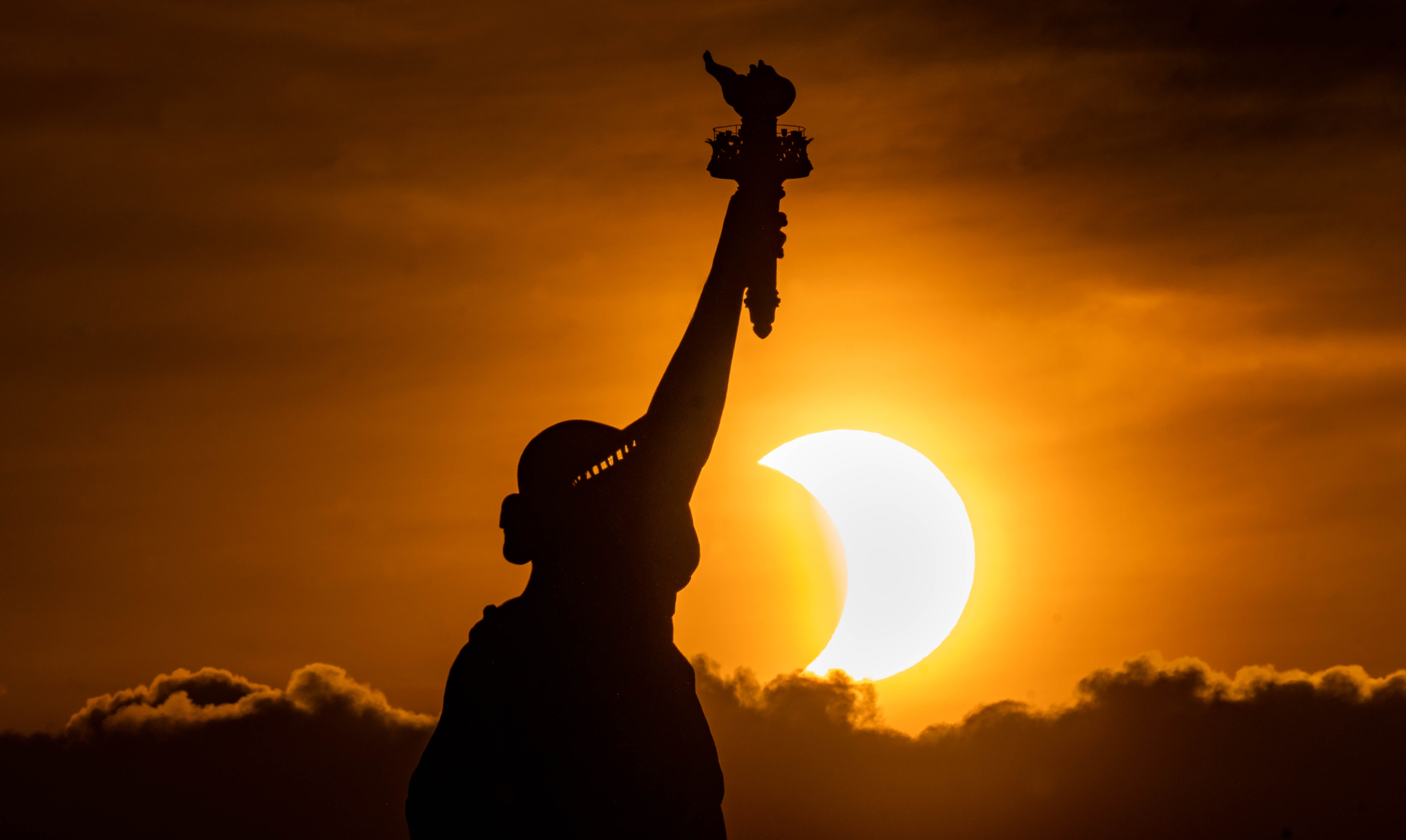
A view of the solar eclipse on June 10, 2021 from the Statue of Liberty in New York City

From 1900 to 2100, the state of New York will have recorded a total of 84 solar eclipses, two of which are annular eclipses and four of which are total eclipses. One of the annular solar eclipses occurred on May 10, 1994, and the other will occur on July 23, 2093. Three of the total solar eclipses occurred on January 24, 1925; October 2, 1959; and April 8, 2024, respectively, and the remaining one will occur on May 1, 2079.

The most recent total solar eclipse in New York was on April 8, 2024; the most recent annular solar eclipse was on May 10, 1994; and the most recent partial solar eclipse was on August 12, 2026. The next total solar eclipse in New York will occur on May 1, 2079; the next annular solar eclipse will occur on July 23, 2093; and the next partial solar eclipse will occur on January 26, 2028.

- August 30, 1905 (P)
- June 28, 1908 (P)
- June 17, 1909 (P)
- April 17, 1912 (P)
- August 21, 1914 (P)
- February 3, 1916 (P)
- June 8, 1918 (P)
- November 22, 1919 (P)
- November 10, 1920 (P)
- September 10, 1923 (P)
- January 24, 1925 (T)
- April 28, 1930 (P)
- August 31, 1932 (P)
- February 3, 1935 (P)
- April 19, 1939 (P)
- April 7, 1940 (P)
- July 9, 1945 (P)
- November 23, 1946 (P)
- November 12, 1947 (P)
- March 7, 1951 (P)
- September 1, 1951 (P)
- June 30, 1954 (P)
- October 2, 1959 (T) †
- September 20, 1960 (P)
- July 20, 1963 (P)
- May 9, 1967 (P)
- March 7, 1970 (P)
- July 10, 1972 (P)
- December 24, 1973 (P)
- December 13, 1974 (P)
- April 29, 1976 (P) †
- October 12, 1977 (P)
- February 26, 1979 (P)
- May 30, 1984 (P)
- October 3, 1986 (P)
- July 11, 1991 (P)
- May 21, 1993 (P) †
- May 10, 1994 (A)
- February 26, 1998 (P)
- August 11, 1999 (P)
- December 25, 2000 (P)
- December 14, 2001 (P)
- June 10, 2002 (P)
- April 8, 2005 (P) †
- May 20, 2012 (P)
- November 3, 2013 (P)
- October 23, 2014 (P)
- August 21, 2017 (P)
- June 10, 2021 (P)
- October 14, 2023 (P)
- April 8, 2024 (T)
- March 29, 2025 (P)
- August 12, 2026 (P)
- → January 26, 2028 (P)
- January 14, 2029 (P)
- November 14, 2031 (P)
- March 30, 2033 (P)
- January 5, 2038 (P)
- July 2, 2038 (P)
- June 21, 2039 (P)
- November 4, 2040 (P)
- August 12, 2045 (P)
- June 11, 2048 (P)
- November 14, 2050 (P)
- March 30, 2052 (P)
- January 27, 2055 (P)
- July 1, 2057 (P)
- June 22, 2066 (P)
- December 6, 2067 (P)
- November 24, 2068 (P)
- April 21, 2069 (P)
- September 23, 2071 (P)
- November 15, 2077 (P)
- May 11, 2078 (P)
- May 1, 2079 (T)
- February 27, 2082 (P)
- February 16, 2083 (P)
- April 21, 2088 (P)
- September 23, 2090 (P)
- February 7, 2092 (P)
- July 23, 2093 (A)
- December 7, 2094 (P)
- September 14, 2099 (P)
- March 10, 2100 (P)

== North Carolina ==
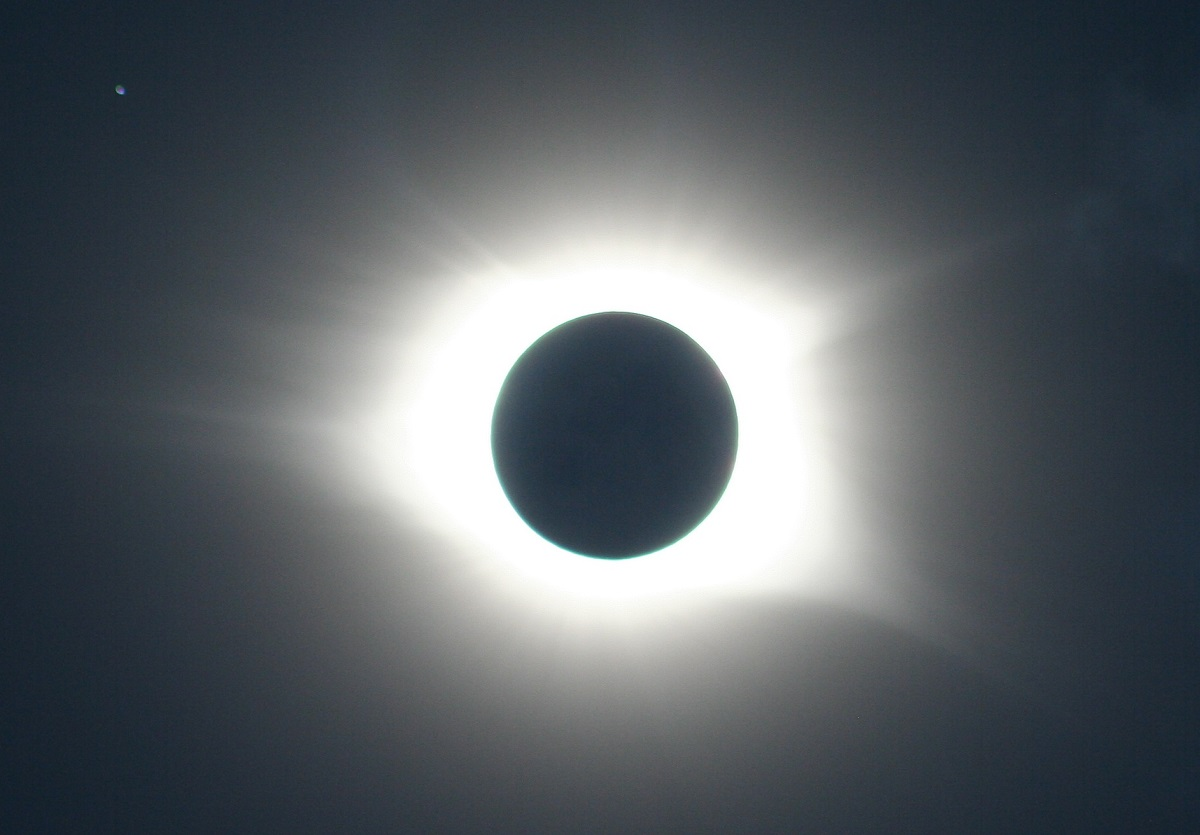
A view of the solar eclipse on August 21, 2017 from Cullowhee, North Carolina, during totality

From 1900 to 2100, the state of North Carolina will have recorded a total of 85 solar eclipses, two of which are annular eclipses and four of which are total eclipses. Both of the annular solar eclipses occurred on September 1, 1951 and May 30, 1984, respectively. Two of the total solar eclipses occurred on March 7, 1970 and August 21, 2017, respectively, and the remaining two will occur on May 11, 2078 and September 14, 2099.

The most recent total solar eclipse in North Carolina was on August 21, 2017; the most recent annular solar eclipse was on May 30, 1984; and the most recent partial solar eclipse was on August 12, 2026. The next total solar eclipse in North Carolina will occur on May 11, 2078, and the next partial solar eclipse will occur on January 26, 2028.

- August 30, 1905 (P)
- January 3, 1908 (P) †
- June 28, 1908 (P)
- June 17, 1909 (P)
- April 28, 1911 (P)
- April 17, 1912 (P)
- October 10, 1912 (P) †
- February 3, 1916 (P)
- June 8, 1918 (P)
- November 22, 1919 (P)
- November 10, 1920 (P)
- September 10, 1923 (P)
- January 24, 1925 (P)
- April 28, 1930 (P)
- August 31, 1932 (P)
- February 3, 1935 (P)
- April 19, 1939 (P)
- April 7, 1940 (P)
- July 9, 1945 (P)
- November 23, 1946 (P)
- November 12, 1947 (P)
- March 7, 1951 (P)
- September 1, 1951 (A)
- June 30, 1954 (P)
- October 2, 1959 (P)
- September 20, 1960 (P)
- July 31, 1962 (P)
- July 20, 1963 (P)
- May 9, 1967 (P)
- September 11, 1969 (P)
- March 7, 1970 (T)
- July 10, 1972 (P)
- December 24, 1973 (P)
- December 13, 1974 (P)
- October 12, 1977 (P)
- February 26, 1979 (P)
- May 30, 1984 (A)
- October 3, 1986 (P)
- July 11, 1991 (P)
- May 10, 1994 (P)
- February 26, 1998 (P)
- August 11, 1999 (P) †
- December 25, 2000 (P)
- December 14, 2001 (P)
- June 10, 2002 (P)
- April 8, 2005 (P)
- May 20, 2012 (P)
- November 3, 2013 (P)
- October 23, 2014 (P)
- August 21, 2017 (T)
- June 10, 2021 (P)
- October 14, 2023 (P)
- April 8, 2024 (P)
- March 29, 2025 (P)
- August 12, 2026 (P)
- → January 26, 2028 (P)
- January 14, 2029 (P)
- November 14, 2031 (P)
- January 5, 2038 (P)
- July 2, 2038 (P)
- November 4, 2040 (P)
- August 12, 2045 (P)
- June 11, 2048 (P)
- May 31, 2049 (P)
- November 14, 2050 (P)
- March 30, 2052 (P)
- January 27, 2055 (P)
- July 12, 2056 (P)
- July 1, 2057 (P)
- June 22, 2066 (P)
- June 11, 2067 (P)
- December 6, 2067 (P)
- November 24, 2068 (P)
- September 23, 2071 (P)
- November 15, 2077 (P)
- May 11, 2078 (T)
- May 1, 2079 (P)
- February 27, 2082 (P)
- February 16, 2083 (P)
- September 23, 2090 (P)
- February 7, 2092 (P)
- July 23, 2093 (P)
- December 7, 2094 (P)
- September 14, 2099 (T)
- March 10, 2100 (P)

== North Dakota ==
An animation of the most recent total solar eclipse to cross North Dakota on February 26, 1979

From 1900 to 2100, the state of North Dakota will have recorded a total of 85 solar eclipses, one of which is an annular eclipse and three of which are total eclipses. The one annular solar eclipse will occur on March 10, 2100. One of the total solar eclipses occurred on February 26, 1979, and the remaining two will occur on August 23, 2044 and September 14, 2099.

The most recent total solar eclipse in North Dakota was on February 26, 1979, and the most recent partial solar eclipse was on August 12, 2026. The next total solar eclipse in North Dakota will occur on August 22, 2044 (local time); the next annular solar eclipse will occur on March 10, 2100; and the next partial solar eclipse will occur on January 26, 2028.

- August 30, 1905 (P)
- August 20, 1906 (P)
- June 28, 1908 (P)
- June 17, 1909 (P)
- April 17, 1912 (P)
- August 21, 1914 (P)
- February 3, 1916 (P)
- June 8, 1918 (P)
- November 22, 1919 (P)
- November 10, 1920 (P)
- September 10, 1923 (P)
- January 24, 1925 (P)
- April 28, 1930 (P)
- August 31, 1932 (P)
- February 3, 1935 (P)
- April 19, 1939 (P)
- April 7, 1940 (P)
- July 9, 1945 (P)
- November 23, 1946 (P)
- November 12, 1947 (P)
- September 1, 1951 (P)
- June 30, 1954 (P)
- April 30, 1957 (P)
- September 20, 1960 (P)
- July 20, 1963 (P)
- May 9, 1967 (P)
- September 11, 1969 (P)
- March 7, 1970 (P)
- July 10, 1972 (P)
- December 24, 1973 (P)
- December 13, 1974 (P)
- October 12, 1977 (P)
- February 26, 1979 (T)
- May 30, 1984 (P)
- October 3, 1986 (P)
- March 7, 1989 (P)
- July 22, 1990 (P)
- July 11, 1991 (P)
- May 21, 1993 (P)
- May 10, 1994 (P)
- July 31, 2000 (P)
- December 25, 2000 (P)
- December 14, 2001 (P)
- June 10, 2002 (P)
- May 20, 2012 (P)
- October 23, 2014 (P)
- August 21, 2017 (P)
- June 10, 2021 (P)
- October 14, 2023 (P)
- April 8, 2024 (P)
- August 12, 2026 (P)
- → January 26, 2028 (P)
- January 14, 2029 (P)
- March 30, 2033 (P)
- June 21, 2039 (P)
- November 4, 2040 (P)
- April 9, 2043 (P)
- August 22, 2044 (T)
- August 12, 2045 (P)
- February 5, 2046 (P)
- June 11, 2048 (P)
- March 30, 2052 (P)
- September 2, 2054 (P)
- January 27, 2055 (P)
- January 16, 2056 (P)
- July 12, 2056 (P)
- July 1, 2057 (P)
- June 22, 2066 (P)
- June 11, 2067 (P)
- November 24, 2068 (P)
- September 23, 2071 (P)
- November 15, 2077 (P)
- May 11, 2078 (P)
- May 1, 2079 (P) †
- February 16, 2083 (P)
- July 3, 2084 (P)
- September 23, 2090 (P)
- February 7, 2092 (P)
- July 23, 2093 (P)
- December 7, 2094 (P)
- May 22, 2096 (P)
- May 11, 2097 (P)
- September 25, 2098 (P)
- September 14, 2099 (T)
- March 10, 2100 (A)

== Ohio ==
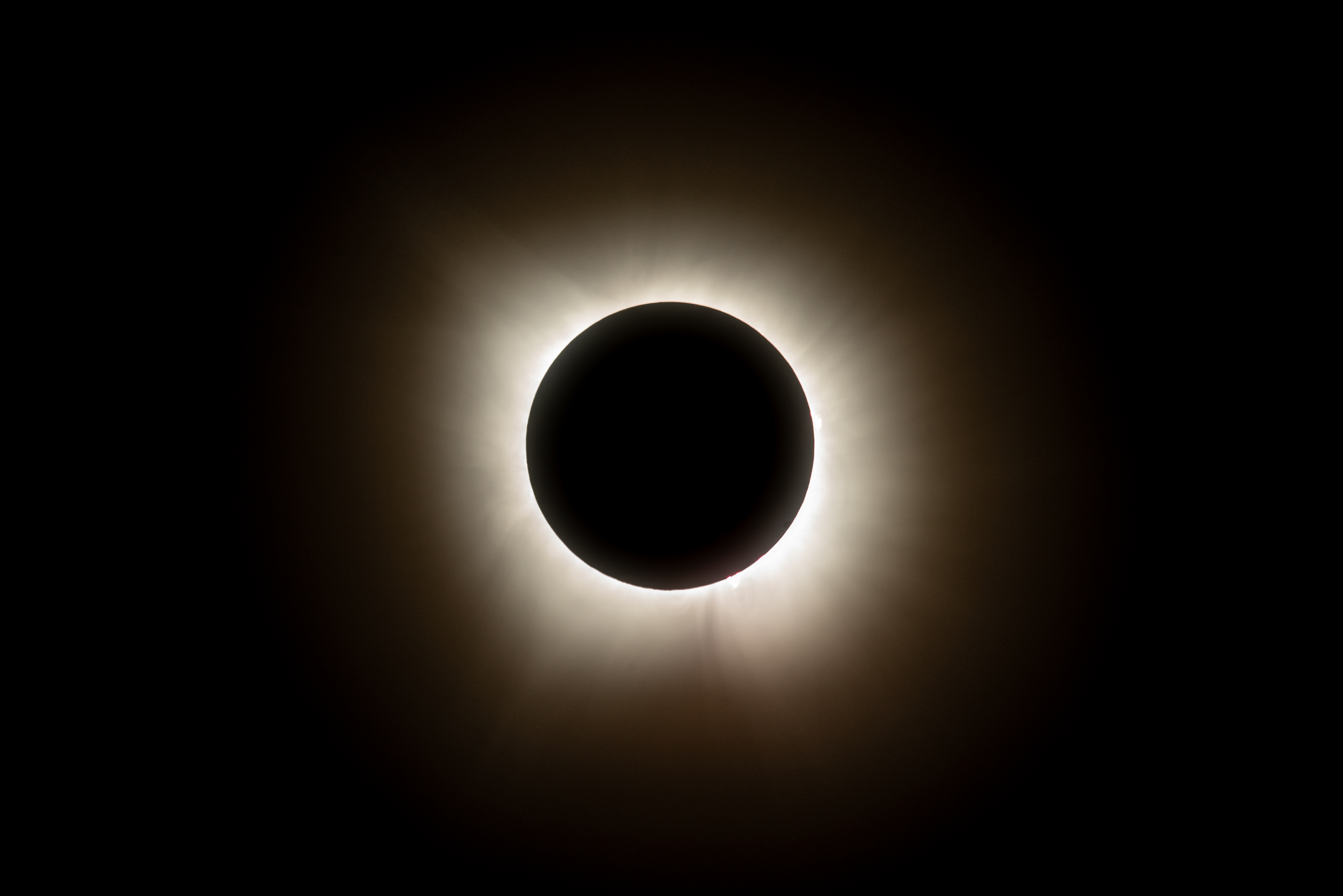
A view of the solar eclipse on April 8, 2024 from Cleveland, Ohio, during totality

From 1900 to 2100, the state of Ohio will have recorded a total of 84 solar eclipses, two of which are annular eclipses and two of which are total eclipses. One annular solar eclipse occurred on May 10, 1994, and the other will occur on July 23, 2093. One of the total solar eclipses occurred on April 8, 2024, and the remaining one will occur on September 14, 2099.

The most recent total solar eclipse in Ohio was on April 8, 2024; the most recent annular solar eclipse was on May 10, 1994; and the most recent partial solar eclipse was on August 12, 2026. The next total solar eclipse in Ohio will occur on September 14, 2099; the next annular solar eclipse will occur on July 23, 2093; and the next partial solar eclipse will occur on January 26, 2028.

- August 30, 1905 (P)
- June 28, 1908 (P)
- June 17, 1909 (P)
- April 28, 1911 (P)
- April 17, 1912 (P)
- August 21, 1914 (P)
- February 3, 1916 (P)
- June 8, 1918 (P)
- November 22, 1919 (P)
- November 10, 1920 (P)
- September 10, 1923 (P)
- January 24, 1925 (P)
- April 28, 1930 (P)
- August 31, 1932 (P)
- February 3, 1935 (P)
- April 19, 1939 (P)
- April 7, 1940 (P)
- July 9, 1945 (P)
- November 23, 1946 (P)
- November 12, 1947 (P)
- March 7, 1951 (P)
- September 1, 1951 (P)
- June 30, 1954 (P)
- October 2, 1959 (P)
- September 20, 1960 (P)
- July 20, 1963 (P)
- May 9, 1967 (P)
- September 11, 1969 (P)
- March 7, 1970 (P)
- July 10, 1972 (P)
- December 24, 1973 (P)
- December 13, 1974 (P)
- October 12, 1977 (P)
- February 26, 1979 (P)
- May 30, 1984 (P)
- October 3, 1986 (P)
- July 11, 1991 (P)
- May 21, 1993 (P)
- May 10, 1994 (A)
- February 26, 1998 (P)
- August 11, 1999 (P) †
- December 25, 2000 (P)
- December 14, 2001 (P)
- June 10, 2002 (P)
- April 8, 2005 (P)
- May 20, 2012 (P)
- November 3, 2013 (P)
- October 23, 2014 (P)
- August 21, 2017 (P)
- June 10, 2021 (P)
- October 14, 2023 (P)
- April 8, 2024 (T)
- August 12, 2026 (P)
- → January 26, 2028 (P)
- January 14, 2029 (P)
- November 14, 2031 (P)
- March 30, 2033 (P)
- January 5, 2038 (P)
- July 2, 2038 (P)
- June 21, 2039 (P)
- November 4, 2040 (P)
- August 12, 2045 (P)
- June 11, 2048 (P)
- November 14, 2050 (P)
- March 30, 2052 (P)
- January 27, 2055 (P)
- July 12, 2056 (P)
- July 1, 2057 (P)
- June 22, 2066 (P)
- June 11, 2067 (P)
- December 6, 2067 (P)
- November 24, 2068 (P)
- September 23, 2071 (P)
- November 15, 2077 (P)
- May 11, 2078 (P)
- May 1, 2079 (P)
- February 27, 2082 (P)
- February 16, 2083 (P)
- September 23, 2090 (P)
- February 7, 2092 (P)
- July 23, 2093 (A)
- December 7, 2094 (P)
- September 14, 2099 (T)
- March 10, 2100 (P)

== Oklahoma ==
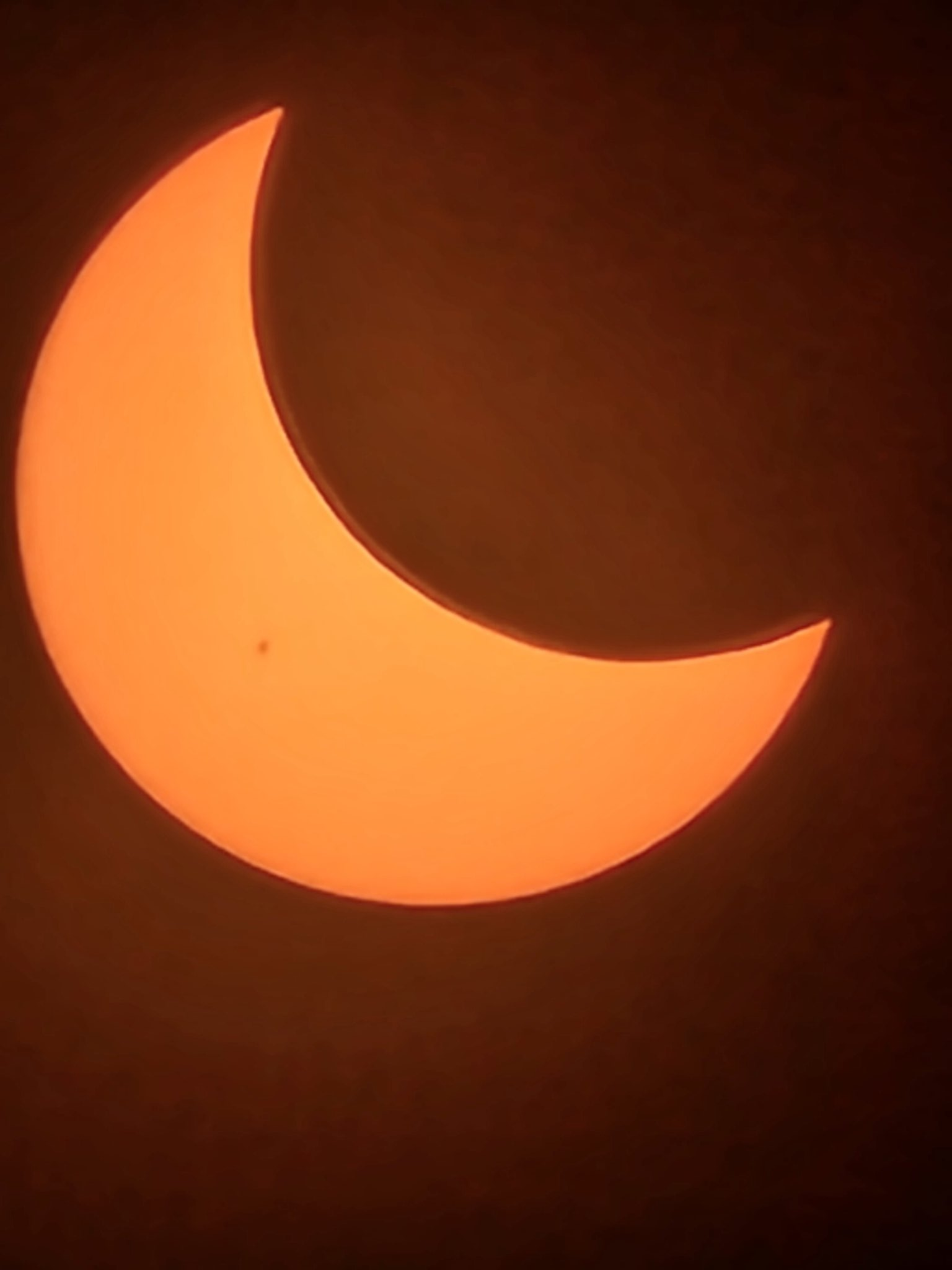
A view of the solar eclipse on October 14, 2023 from Norman, Oklahoma, during its partial phase

From 1900 to 2100, the state of Oklahoma will have recorded a total of 90 solar eclipses, two of which are annular eclipses and three of which are total eclipses. One annular solar eclipse occurred on May 10, 1994, and the other will occur on June 11, 2048. Two total solar eclipses occurred on June 8, 1918 and April 8, 2024, respectively, and the remaining one will occur on August 12, 2045.

The most recent total solar eclipse in Oklahoma was on April 8, 2024; the most recent annular solar eclipse was on May 10, 1994; and the most recent partial solar eclipse was on October 14, 2023 (not counting April 8). The next total solar eclipse in Oklahoma will occur on Solar eclipse of August 12, 2045; the next annular solar eclipse will occur on June 11, 2048; and the next partial solar eclipse will occur on January 26, 2028.

- August 30, 1905 (P)
- January 3, 1908 (P)
- June 28, 1908 (P)
- June 17, 1909 (P)
- April 28, 1911 (P)
- February 3, 1916 (P)
- June 8, 1918 (T)
- November 22, 1919 (P)
- November 10, 1920 (P)
- September 10, 1923 (P)
- January 24, 1925 (P)
- July 9, 1926 (P)
- April 28, 1930 (P)
- August 31, 1932 (P)
- February 3, 1935 (P)
- June 8, 1937 (P)
- December 2, 1937 (P) †
- April 19, 1939 (P)
- April 7, 1940 (P)
- January 25, 1944 (P)
- July 9, 1945 (P)
- November 23, 1946 (P)
- November 12, 1947 (P)
- March 7, 1951 (P)
- September 1, 1951 (P)
- June 30, 1954 (P)
- September 20, 1960 (P)
- July 20, 1963 (P)
- May 9, 1967 (P)
- September 11, 1969 (P)
- March 7, 1970 (P)
- July 10, 1972 (P)
- December 24, 1973 (P)
- December 13, 1974 (P)
- October 12, 1977 (P)
- February 26, 1979 (P)
- August 10, 1980 (P)
- May 30, 1984 (P)
- October 3, 1986 (P)
- March 7, 1989 (P)
- July 11, 1991 (P)
- January 4, 1992 (P)
- May 21, 1993 (P)
- May 10, 1994 (A)
- February 26, 1998 (P)
- December 25, 2000 (P)
- December 14, 2001 (P)
- June 10, 2002 (P)
- April 8, 2005 (P)
- May 20, 2012 (P)
- October 23, 2014 (P)
- August 21, 2017 (P)
- October 14, 2023 (P)
- April 8, 2024 (T)
- → January 26, 2028 (P)
- January 14, 2029 (P)
- November 14, 2031 (P)
- March 30, 2033 (P)
- July 2, 2038 (P)
- June 21, 2039 (P)
- November 4, 2040 (P)
- August 22, 2044 (P)
- August 12, 2045 (T)
- February 5, 2046 (P)
- June 11, 2048 (A)
- March 30, 2052 (P)
- September 2, 2054 (P) †
- January 27, 2055 (P)
- January 16, 2056 (P)
- July 12, 2056 (P)
- July 1, 2057 (P)
- June 22, 2066 (P)
- June 11, 2067 (P)
- December 6, 2067 (P)
- November 24, 2068 (P)
- September 23, 2071 (P)
- November 15, 2077 (P)
- May 11, 2078 (P)
- February 27, 2082 (P)
- February 16, 2083 (P)
- July 3, 2084 (P)
- December 16, 2085 (P)
- September 23, 2090 (P)
- February 7, 2092 (P)
- July 23, 2093 (P)
- December 7, 2094 (P)
- September 25, 2098 (P)
- March 21, 2099 (P)
- September 14, 2099 (P)
- March 10, 2100 (P)

== Oregon ==
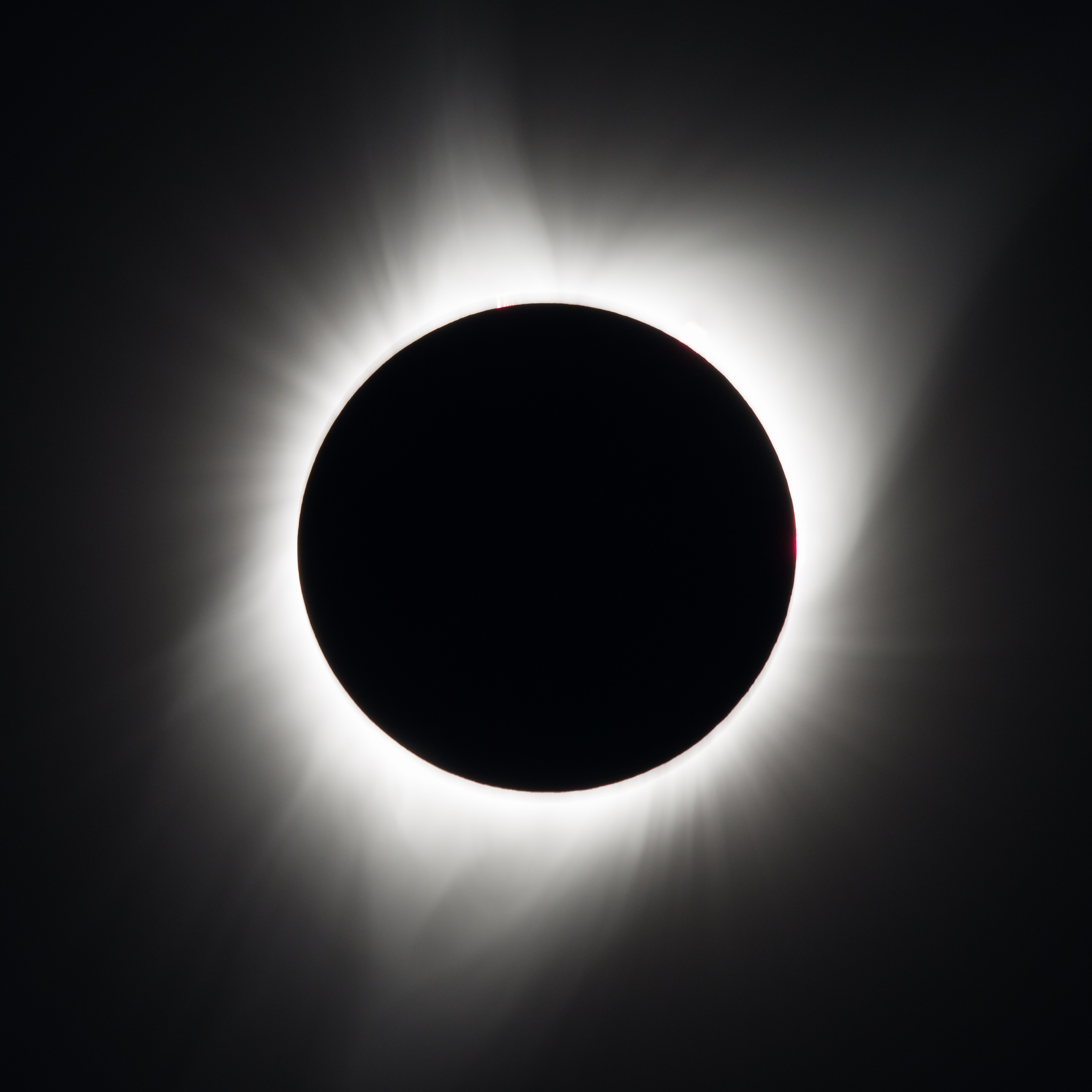
A view of the solar eclipse on August 21, 2017 from Madras, Oregon, during totality

From 1900 to 2100, the state of Oregon will have recorded a total of 89 solar eclipses, six of which are annular eclipses, four of which are total eclipses, and one of which is a hybrid eclipse. Two annular solar eclipse occurred on May 20, 2012 and October 14, 2023, and the remaining four will occur on February 5, 2046; November 15, 2077; July 3, 2084; and Solar eclipse of March 10, 2100. The four total solar eclipses occurred on June 8, 1918; July 9, 1945; February 26, 1979; and August 21, 2017. The lone hybrid eclipse, of which its total eclipse portion passed over Oregon, occurred on April 28, 1930.

The most recent total solar eclipse in Oregon was on August 21, 2017; the most recent annular solar eclipse was on October 14, 2023; and the most recent partial solar eclipse was on April 8, 2024. The next annular solar eclipse will occur on February 5, 2046, and the next partial solar eclipse will occur on January 14, 2029.

- March 29, 1903 (P)
- August 20, 1906 (P)
- June 28, 1908 (P)
- June 17, 1909 (P)
- April 28, 1911 (P)
- April 6, 1913 (P)
- February 3, 1916 (P)
- June 19, 1917 (P)
- June 8, 1918 (T)
- November 10, 1920 (P)
- September 10, 1923 (P)
- July 9, 1926 (P)
- April 28, 1930 (H)
- August 31, 1932 (P)
- February 14, 1934 (P)
- February 3, 1935 (P)
- December 2, 1937 (P)
- November 21, 1938 (P)
- April 19, 1939 (P)
- April 7, 1940 (P)
- February 4, 1943 (P)
- July 9, 1945 (T) †
- November 23, 1946 (P)
- November 12, 1947 (P)
- May 9, 1948 (P)
- July 11, 1953 (P)
- June 30, 1954 (P)
- April 30, 1957 (P)
- September 20, 1960 (P)
- February 5, 1962 (P)
- July 20, 1963 (P)
- May 9, 1967 (P)
- September 11, 1969 (P)
- March 7, 1970 (P)
- July 10, 1972 (P)
- December 13, 1974 (P)
- October 12, 1977 (P)
- February 26, 1979 (T)
- May 30, 1984 (P)
- October 3, 1986 (P)
- March 7, 1989 (P)
- July 22, 1990 (P)
- July 11, 1991 (P)
- January 4, 1992 (P)
- May 21, 1993 (P)
- May 10, 1994 (P)
- July 31, 2000 (P)
- December 25, 2000 (P)
- December 14, 2001 (P)
- June 10, 2002 (P)
- May 20, 2012 (A)
- October 23, 2014 (P)
- August 21, 2017 (T)
- October 14, 2023 (A)
- April 8, 2024 (P)
- → January 14, 2029 (P)
- March 30, 2033 (P)
- September 2, 2035 (P)
- June 21, 2039 (P)
- November 4, 2040 (P)
- April 20, 2042 (P)
- April 9, 2043 (P)
- August 22, 2044 (P)
- August 12, 2045 (P)
- February 5, 2046 (A)
- June 11, 2048 (P)
- March 30, 2052 (P)
- September 2, 2054 (P)
- January 27, 2055 (P)
- January 16, 2056 (P)
- July 12, 2056 (P)
- July 1, 2057 (P)
- June 22, 2066 (P)
- June 11, 2067 (P)
- November 24, 2068 (P)
- September 23, 2071 (P)
- November 15, 2077 (A)
- May 11, 2078 (P)
- February 16, 2083 (P)
- July 3, 2084 (A)
- December 16, 2085 (P)
- May 2, 2087 (P)
- September 23, 2090 (P)
- December 7, 2094 (P)
- May 22, 2096 (P)
- May 11, 2097 (P)
- September 25, 2098 (P)
- September 14, 2099 (P)
- March 10, 2100 (A)

== Pennsylvania ==
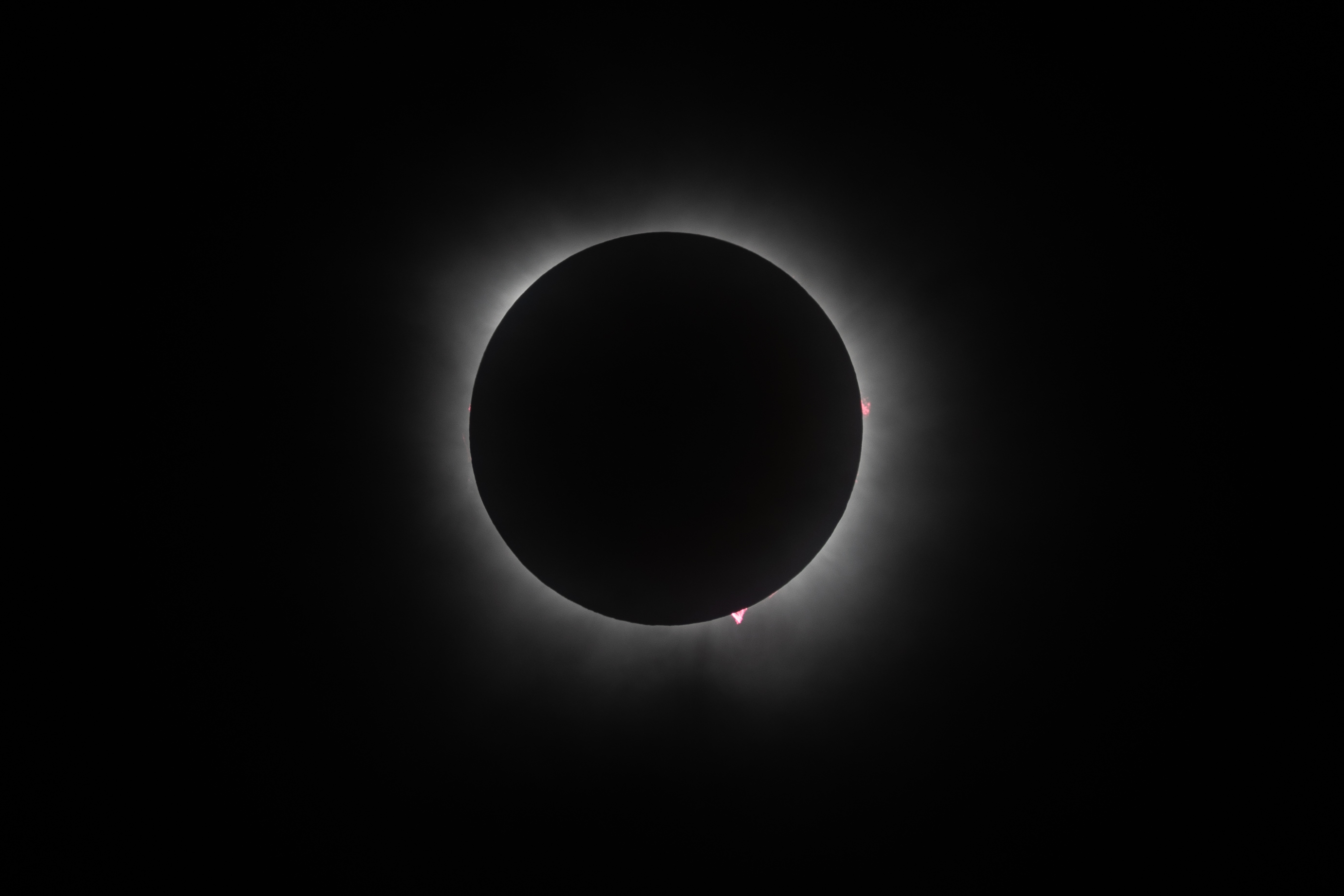
A view of the solar eclipse on April 8, 2024 from Harborcreek, Pennsylvania, during totality

From 1900 to 2100, the state of Pennsylvania will have recorded a total of 84 solar eclipses, two of which are annular eclipses and four of which are total eclipses. One annular solar eclipse occurred on May 10, 1994, and the other will occur on July 23, 2093. Two of the total solar eclipses occurred on January 24, 1925 and April 8, 2024, and the remaining two will occur on May 1, 2079 and September 14, 2099.

The most recent total solar eclipse in Pennsylvania was on April 8, 2024; the most recent annular solar eclipse was on May 10, 1994; and the most recent partial solar eclipse was on August 12, 2026. The next total solar eclipse in Pennsylvania will occur on May 1, 2079; the next annular solar eclipse will occur on July 23, 2093; and the next partial solar eclipse will occur on January 26, 2028.

- August 30, 1905 (P)
- June 28, 1908 (P)
- June 17, 1909 (P)
- April 28, 1911 (P)
- April 17, 1912 (P)
- August 21, 1914 (P)
- February 3, 1916 (P)
- June 8, 1918 (P)
- November 22, 1919 (P)
- November 10, 1920 (P)
- September 10, 1923 (P)
- January 24, 1925 (T)
- April 28, 1930 (P)
- August 31, 1932 (P)
- February 3, 1935 (P)
- April 19, 1939 (P)
- April 7, 1940 (P)
- July 9, 1945 (P)
- November 23, 1946 (P)
- November 12, 1947 (P)
- March 7, 1951 (P)
- September 1, 1951 (P)
- June 30, 1954 (P)
- October 2, 1959 (P)
- September 20, 1960 (P)
- July 20, 1963 (P)
- May 9, 1967 (P)
- September 11, 1969 (P) †
- March 7, 1970 (P)
- July 10, 1972 (P)
- December 24, 1973 (P)
- December 13, 1974 (P)
- October 12, 1977 (P)
- February 26, 1979 (P)
- May 30, 1984 (P)
- October 3, 1986 (P)
- July 11, 1991 (P)
- May 10, 1994 (A)
- February 26, 1998 (P)
- August 11, 1999 (P)
- December 25, 2000 (P)
- December 14, 2001 (P)
- June 10, 2002 (P)
- April 8, 2005 (P)
- May 20, 2012 (P)
- November 3, 2013 (P)
- October 23, 2014 (P)
- August 21, 2017 (P)
- June 10, 2021 (P)
- October 14, 2023 (P)
- April 8, 2024 (T)
- March 29, 2025 (P)
- August 12, 2026 (P)
- → January 26, 2028 (P)
- January 14, 2029 (P)
- November 14, 2031 (P)
- March 30, 2033 (P)
- January 5, 2038 (P)
- July 2, 2038 (P)
- June 21, 2039 (P)
- November 4, 2040 (P)
- August 12, 2045 (P)
- June 11, 2048 (P)
- November 14, 2050 (P)
- March 30, 2052 (P)
- January 27, 2055 (P)
- July 12, 2056 (P)
- July 1, 2057 (P)
- June 22, 2066 (P)
- June 11, 2067 (P)
- December 6, 2067 (P)
- November 24, 2068 (P)
- September 23, 2071 (P)
- November 15, 2077 (P)
- May 11, 2078 (P)
- May 1, 2079 (T)
- February 27, 2082 (P)
- February 16, 2083 (P)
- September 23, 2090 (P)
- February 7, 2092 (P)
- July 23, 2093 (A)
- December 7, 2094 (P)
- September 14, 2099 (T)
- March 10, 2100 (P)

== Rhode Island ==
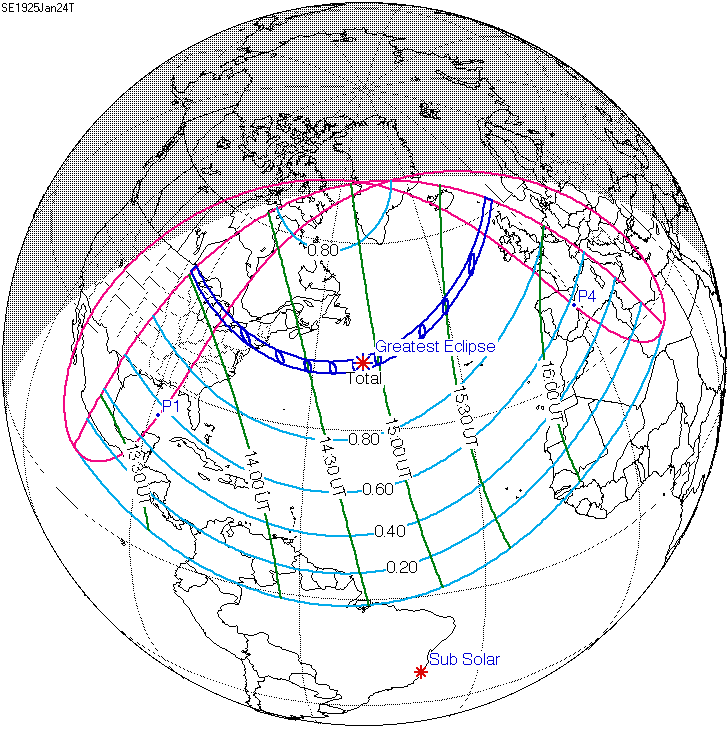
The path of the most recent total solar eclipse to cross Rhode Island on January 24, 1925

From 1900 to 2100, the state of Rhode Island will have recorded a total of 77 solar eclipses, two of which are total eclipses. One of the total solar eclipses occurred on January 24, 1925, and the remaining one will occur on May 1, 2079.

The most recent total solar eclipse in Rhode Island was on January 24, 1925, and the most recent partial solar eclipse was on August 12, 2026. The next total solar eclipse in Rhode Island will occur on May 1, 2079, and the next partial solar eclipse will occur on January 26, 2028.

- August 30, 1905 (P)
- June 28, 1908 (P)
- June 17, 1909 (P)
- April 17, 1912 (P)
- August 21, 1914 (P)
- February 3, 1916 (P)
- June 8, 1918 (P)
- November 22, 1919 (P)
- November 10, 1920 (P)
- September 10, 1923 (P)
- January 24, 1925 (T)
- November 1, 1929 (P)
- April 28, 1930 (P)
- August 31, 1932 (P)
- February 3, 1935 (P)
- April 19, 1939 (P)
- April 7, 1940 (P)
- July 9, 1945 (P)
- November 23, 1946 (P)
- November 12, 1947 (P)
- March 7, 1951 (P)
- September 1, 1951 (P)
- June 30, 1954 (P)
- October 2, 1959 (P)
- July 20, 1963 (P)
- May 9, 1967 (P)
- March 7, 1970 (P)
- July 10, 1972 (P)
- December 24, 1973 (P)
- December 13, 1974 (P)
- April 29, 1976 (P)
- October 12, 1977 (P)
- February 26, 1979 (P)
- May 30, 1984 (P)
- October 3, 1986 (P)
- July 11, 1991 (P)
- May 10, 1994 (P)
- February 26, 1998 (P)
- August 11, 1999 (P)
- December 25, 2000 (P)
- December 14, 2001 (P)
- November 3, 2013 (P)
- October 23, 2014 (P)
- August 21, 2017 (P)
- June 10, 2021 (P)
- October 14, 2023 (P)
- April 8, 2024 (P)
- March 29, 2025 (P)
- August 12, 2026 (P)
- → January 26, 2028 (P)
- January 14, 2029 (P)
- March 30, 2033 (P)
- January 5, 2038 (P)
- July 2, 2038 (P)
- June 21, 2039 (P)
- November 4, 2040 (P)
- August 12, 2045 (P)
- June 11, 2048 (P)
- November 14, 2050 (P)
- March 30, 2052 (P)
- January 27, 2055 (P)
- July 1, 2057 (P)
- June 22, 2066 (P)
- December 6, 2067 (P)
- April 21, 2069 (P)
- September 23, 2071 (P)
- November 15, 2077 (P)
- May 11, 2078 (P)
- May 1, 2079 (T)
- February 27, 2082 (P)
- February 16, 2083 (P)
- April 21, 2088 (P)
- September 23, 2090 (P)
- February 7, 2092 (P)
- July 23, 2093 (P)
- December 7, 2094 (P)
- September 14, 2099 (P)

== South Carolina ==
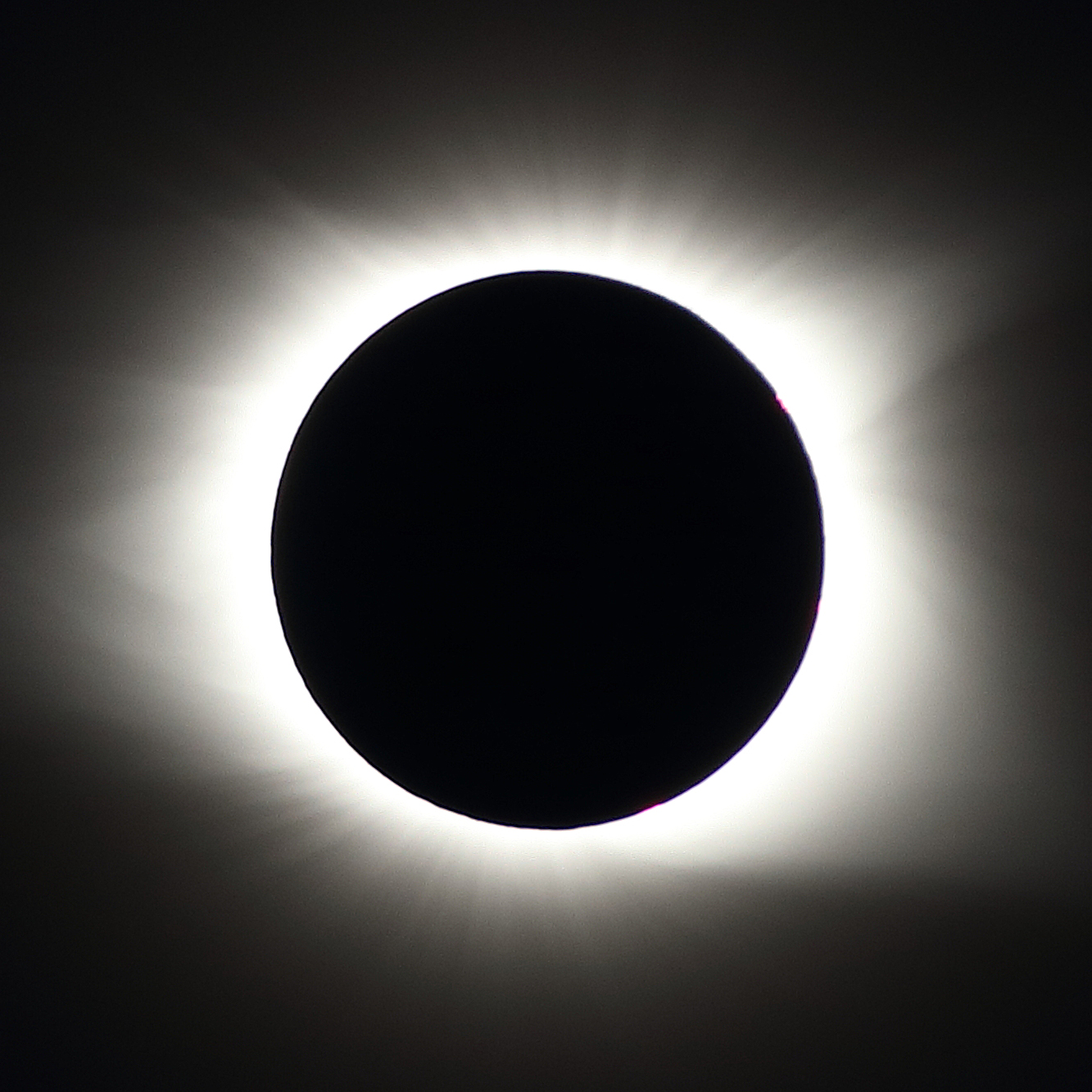
A view of the solar eclipse on August 21, 2017 from Newberry, South Carolina, during totality

From 1900 to 2100, the state of South Carolina will have recorded a total of 82 solar eclipses, two of which are annular eclipses and four of which are total eclipses. Both annular solar eclipses occurred on April 7, 1940 and May 30, 1984, respectively. Two of the total solar eclipses occurred on March 7, 1970 and August 21, 2017, and the remaining two will occur on March 30, 2052 and May 11, 2078.

The most recent total solar eclipse in South Carolina was on August 21, 2017; the most recent annular solar eclipse was on May 30, 1984; and the most recent partial solar eclipse was on April 8, 2024. The next total solar eclipse in South Carolina will occur on March 30, 2052, and the next partial solar eclipse will occur on January 26, 2028.

- August 30, 1905 (P)
- June 28, 1908 (P)
- June 17, 1909 (P)
- April 28, 1911 (P)
- April 17, 1912 (P)
- October 10, 1912 (P)
- February 3, 1916 (P)
- June 8, 1918 (P)
- November 22, 1919 (P)
- November 10, 1920 (P)
- September 10, 1923 (P)
- January 24, 1925 (P)
- July 9, 1926 (P)
- April 28, 1930 (P)
- August 31, 1932 (P)
- February 3, 1935 (P)
- April 19, 1939 (P)
- April 7, 1940 (A) †
- October 1, 1940 (P) †
- July 9, 1945 (P)
- November 23, 1946 (P)
- November 12, 1947 (P)
- March 7, 1951 (P)
- September 1, 1951 (P)
- June 30, 1954 (P)
- October 2, 1959 (P)
- September 20, 1960 (P)
- July 31, 1962 (P)
- July 20, 1963 (P)
- May 9, 1967 (P)
- September 11, 1969 (P)
- March 7, 1970 (T)
- July 10, 1972 (P)
- December 24, 1973 (P)
- December 13, 1974 (P)
- October 12, 1977 (P)
- February 26, 1979 (P)
- May 30, 1984 (A)
- October 3, 1986 (P)
- July 11, 1991 (P)
- May 10, 1994 (P)
- February 26, 1998 (P)
- December 25, 2000 (P)
- December 14, 2001 (P)
- June 10, 2002 (P)
- April 8, 2005 (P)
- May 20, 2012 (P)
- November 3, 2013 (P)
- October 23, 2014 (P)
- August 21, 2017 (T)
- June 10, 2021 (P)
- October 14, 2023 (P)
- April 8, 2024 (P)
- → January 26, 2028 (P)
- January 14, 2029 (P)
- November 14, 2031 (P)
- January 5, 2038 (P)
- July 2, 2038 (P)
- November 4, 2040 (P)
- August 12, 2045 (P)
- June 11, 2048 (P)
- May 31, 2049 (P)
- March 30, 2052 (T)
- January 27, 2055 (P)
- July 12, 2056 (P)
- July 1, 2057 (P)
- June 22, 2066 (P)
- June 11, 2067 (P)
- December 6, 2067 (P)
- November 24, 2068 (P)
- September 23, 2071 (P)
- November 15, 2077 (P)
- May 11, 2078 (T)
- May 1, 2079 (P)
- February 27, 2082 (P)
- February 16, 2083 (P)
- September 23, 2090 (P)
- February 7, 2092 (P)
- July 23, 2093 (P)
- December 7, 2094 (P)
- September 14, 2099 (P)
- March 10, 2100 (P)

== South Dakota ==
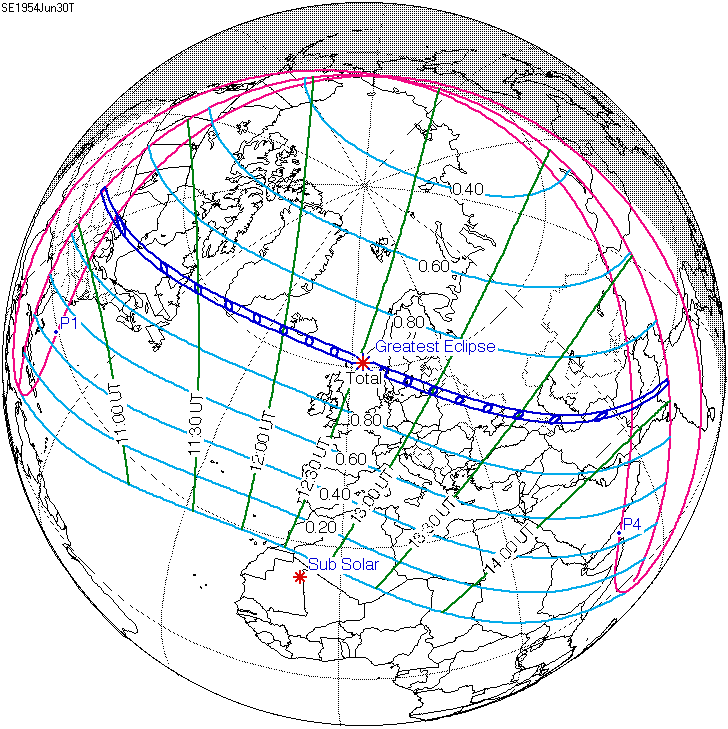
The path of the most recent total solar eclipse to cross South Dakota on June 30, 1954

From 1900 to 2100, the state of South Dakota will have recorded a total of 86 solar eclipses, two of which are annular eclipses and three of which are total eclipses. Both annular solar eclipses will occur on June 11, 2048 and Solar eclipse of March 10, 2100, respectively. One of the total solar eclipses occurred on June 30, 1954, and the remaining two will occur on August 23, 2044 and September 14, 2099.

The most recent total solar eclipse in South Dakota was on June 30, 1954, and the most recent partial solar eclipse was on August 12, 2026. The next total solar eclipse in South Dakota will occur on August 22, 2044 (local time); the next annular solar eclipse will occur on June 11, 2048; and the next partial solar eclipse will occur on January 26, 2028.

- August 30, 1905 (P)
- August 20, 1906 (P)
- June 28, 1908 (P)
- June 17, 1909 (P)
- April 28, 1911 (P)
- April 17, 1912 (P) †
- August 21, 1914 (P) †
- February 3, 1916 (P)
- June 8, 1918 (P)
- November 22, 1919 (P)
- November 10, 1920 (P)
- September 10, 1923 (P)
- January 24, 1925 (P)
- July 9, 1926 (P)
- April 28, 1930 (P)
- August 31, 1932 (P)
- February 3, 1935 (P)
- April 19, 1939 (P)
- April 7, 1940 (P)
- July 9, 1945 (P)
- November 23, 1946 (P)
- November 12, 1947 (P)
- September 1, 1951 (P)
- June 30, 1954 (T)
- April 30, 1957 (P)
- September 20, 1960 (P)
- July 20, 1963 (P)
- May 9, 1967 (P)
- September 11, 1969 (P)
- March 7, 1970 (P)
- July 10, 1972 (P)
- December 24, 1973 (P)
- December 13, 1974 (P)
- October 12, 1977 (P)
- February 26, 1979 (P)
- May 30, 1984 (P)
- October 3, 1986 (P)
- March 7, 1989 (P)
- July 11, 1991 (P)
- May 21, 1993 (P)
- May 10, 1994 (P)
- July 31, 2000 (P) †
- December 25, 2000 (P)
- December 14, 2001 (P)
- June 10, 2002 (P)
- May 20, 2012 (P)
- October 23, 2014 (P)
- August 21, 2017 (P)
- June 10, 2021 (P)
- October 14, 2023 (P)
- April 8, 2024 (P)
- August 12, 2026 (P)
- → January 26, 2028 (P)
- January 14, 2029 (P)
- November 14, 2031 (P) †
- March 30, 2033 (P)
- June 21, 2039 (P)
- November 4, 2040 (P)
- April 9, 2043 (P)
- August 22, 2044 (T)
- August 12, 2045 (P)
- February 5, 2046 (P)
- June 11, 2048 (A) †
- March 30, 2052 (P)
- September 2, 2054 (P)
- January 27, 2055 (P)
- January 16, 2056 (P)
- July 12, 2056 (P)
- July 1, 2057 (P)
- June 22, 2066 (P)
- June 11, 2067 (P)
- November 24, 2068 (P)
- September 23, 2071 (P)
- November 15, 2077 (P)
- May 11, 2078 (P)
- February 16, 2083 (P)
- July 3, 2084 (P)
- December 16, 2085 (P)
- September 23, 2090 (P)
- February 7, 2092 (P)
- July 23, 2093 (P)
- December 7, 2094 (P)
- May 11, 2097 (P)
- September 25, 2098 (P)
- September 14, 2099 (T)
- March 10, 2100 (A)

== Tennessee ==
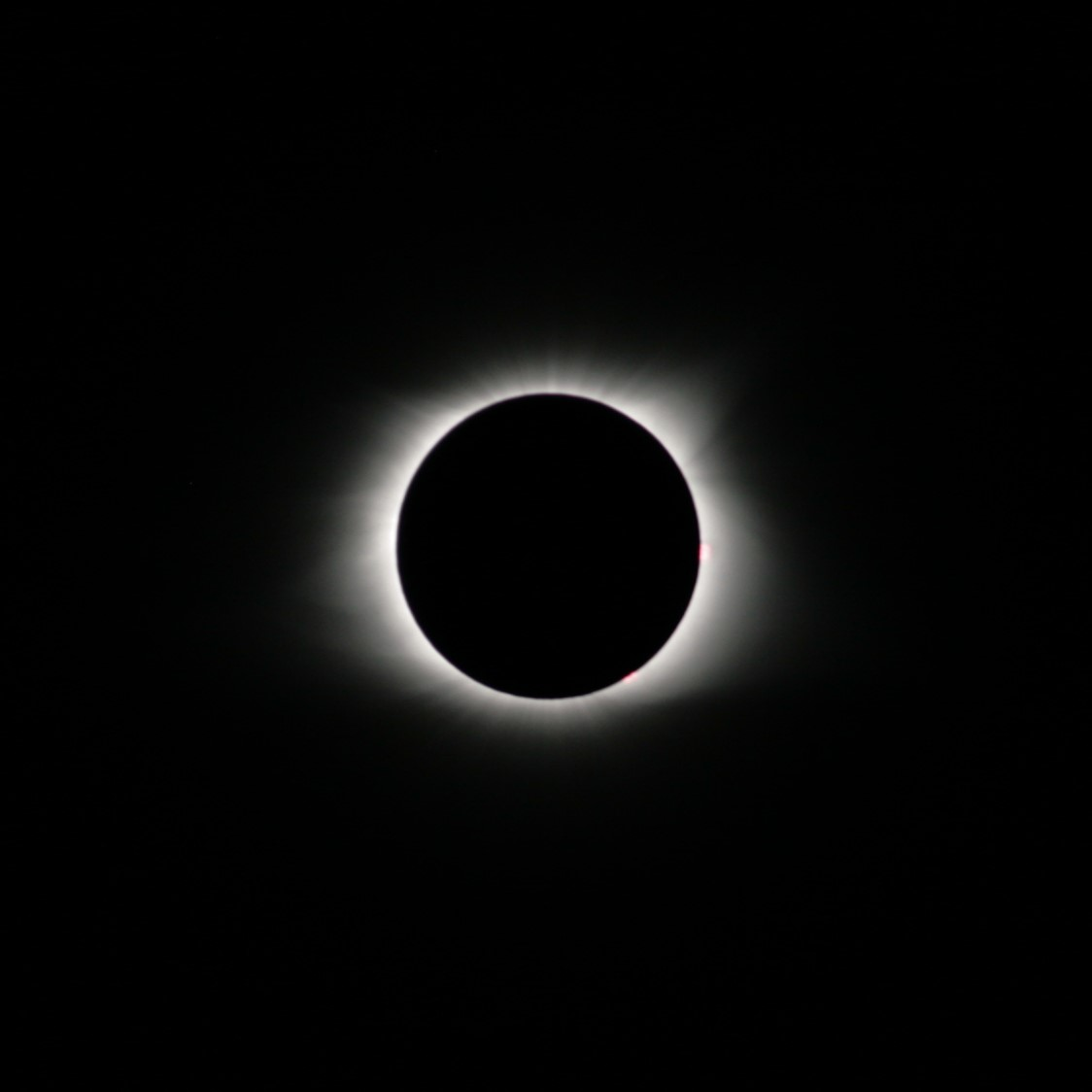
A view of the solar eclipse on August 21, 2017 from Sweetwater, Tennessee, during totality

From 1900 to 2100, the state of Tennessee will have recorded a total of 83 solar eclipses, one of which is an annular eclipse and two of which are total eclipses. The one annular solar eclipse occurred on September 1, 1951. Both of the total solar eclipses occurred on August 21, 2017 and April 8, 2024.

The most recent total solar eclipse in Tennessee was on April 8, 2024; the most recent annular solar eclipse was on September 1, 1951; and the most recent partial solar eclipse was on October 14, 2023 (not counting April 8). The next partial solar eclipse will occur on January 26, 2028.

- August 30, 1905 (P)
- January 3, 1908 (P)
- June 28, 1908 (P)
- June 17, 1909 (P)
- April 28, 1911 (P)
- April 17, 1912 (P)
- October 10, 1912 (P)
- February 3, 1916 (P)
- June 8, 1918 (P)
- November 22, 1919 (P)
- November 10, 1920 (P)
- September 10, 1923 (P)
- January 24, 1925 (P)
- July 9, 1926 (P)
- April 28, 1930 (P)
- August 31, 1932 (P)
- February 3, 1935 (P)
- April 19, 1939 (P)
- April 7, 1940 (P)
- July 9, 1945 (P)
- November 23, 1946 (P)
- November 12, 1947 (P)
- March 7, 1951 (P)
- September 1, 1951 (A)
- June 30, 1954 (P)
- October 2, 1959 (P)
- September 20, 1960 (P)
- July 20, 1963 (P)
- May 9, 1967 (P)
- September 11, 1969 (P)
- March 7, 1970 (P)
- July 10, 1972 (P)
- December 24, 1973 (P)
- December 13, 1974 (P)
- October 12, 1977 (P)
- February 26, 1979 (P)
- May 30, 1984 (P)
- October 3, 1986 (P)
- July 11, 1991 (P)
- May 10, 1994 (P)
- February 26, 1998 (P)
- December 25, 2000 (P)
- December 14, 2001 (P)
- June 10, 2002 (P)
- April 8, 2005 (P)
- May 20, 2012 (P)
- November 3, 2013 (P)
- October 23, 2014 (P)
- August 21, 2017 (T)
- June 10, 2021 (P)
- October 14, 2023 (P)
- April 8, 2024 (T) †
- → January 26, 2028 (P)
- January 14, 2029 (P)
- November 14, 2031 (P)
- March 30, 2033 (P)
- January 5, 2038 (P)
- July 2, 2038 (P)
- June 21, 2039 (P) †
- November 4, 2040 (P)
- August 12, 2045 (P)
- June 11, 2048 (P)
- March 30, 2052 (P)
- January 27, 2055 (P)
- January 16, 2056 (P)
- July 12, 2056 (P)
- July 1, 2057 (P)
- June 22, 2066 (P)
- June 11, 2067 (P)
- December 6, 2067 (P)
- November 24, 2068 (P)
- September 23, 2071 (P)
- November 15, 2077 (P)
- May 11, 2078 (P)
- May 1, 2079 (P)
- February 27, 2082 (P)
- February 16, 2083 (P)
- September 23, 2090 (P)
- February 7, 2092 (P)
- July 23, 2093 (P)
- December 7, 2094 (P)
- September 14, 2099 (P)
- March 10, 2100 (P)

== Texas ==
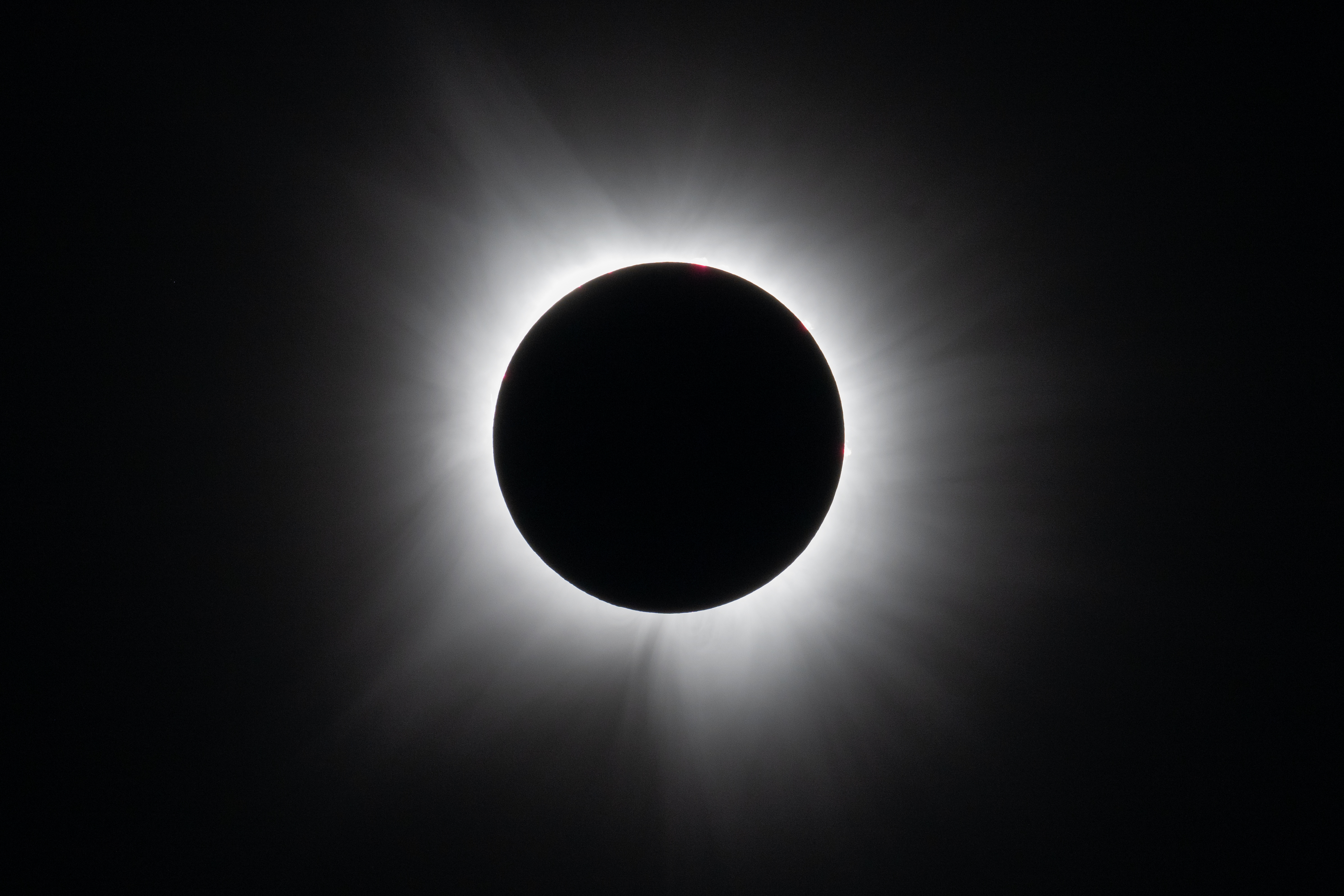
A view of the solar eclipse on April 8, 2024 from Dallas, Texas, during totality

From 1900 to 2100, the state of Texas will have recorded a total of 97 solar eclipses, seven of which are annular eclipses and four of which are total eclipses. Five of the annular solar eclipses have occurred on November 22, 1919; April 7, 1940; May 10, 1994; May 20, 2012; and October 14, 2023, respectively, and the remaining two will occur on January 16, 2056 and November 15, 2077. One of the total solar eclipses occurred on April 8, 2024, and the remaining three will occur on August 12, 2045; March 30, 2052; and May 11, 2078.

The most recent total solar eclipse in Texas was on April 8, 2024; the most recent annular solar eclipse was on October 14, 2023; and the most recent partial solar eclipse was on August 21, 2017 (not counting October 14, 2023, or April 8, 2024). The next total solar eclipse in Texas will occur on August 12, 2045; the next annular solar eclipse will occur on January 16, 2056; and the next partial solar eclipse will occur on January 26, 2028.

- August 30, 1905 (P)
- January 3, 1908 (P)
- June 28, 1908 (P)
- June 17, 1909 (P)
- April 28, 1911 (P)
- October 10, 1912 (P)
- February 3, 1916 (P)
- June 8, 1918 (P)
- November 22, 1919 (A)
- September 10, 1923 (P)
- January 24, 1925 (P)
- July 9, 1926 (P)
- April 28, 1930 (P)
- August 31, 1932 (P)
- February 3, 1935 (P)
- June 8, 1937 (P)
- December 2, 1937 (P)
- April 19, 1939 (P)
- April 7, 1940 (A)
- January 25, 1944 (P)
- July 9, 1945 (P)
- November 23, 1946 (P)
- November 12, 1947 (P)
- March 7, 1951 (P)
- September 1, 1951 (P)
- June 30, 1954 (P)
- September 20, 1960 (P)
- July 20, 1963 (P)
- May 30, 1965 (P)
- November 12, 1966 (P)
- May 9, 1967 (P)
- September 11, 1969 (P)
- March 7, 1970 (P)
- July 10, 1972 (P)
- December 24, 1973 (P)
- December 13, 1974 (P)
- October 12, 1977 (P)
- February 26, 1979 (P)
- August 10, 1980 (P)
- May 30, 1984 (P)
- October 3, 1986 (P)
- March 7, 1989 (P)
- July 11, 1991 (P)
- January 4, 1992 (P)
- May 21, 1993 (P)
- May 10, 1994 (A)
- February 26, 1998 (P)
- December 25, 2000 (P)
- December 14, 2001 (P)
- June 10, 2002 (P)
- April 8, 2005 (P)
- May 20, 2012 (A)
- October 23, 2014 (P)
- August 21, 2017 (P)
- October 14, 2023 (A)
- April 8, 2024 (T)
- → January 26, 2028 (P)
- January 14, 2029 (P)
- November 14, 2031 (P)
- March 30, 2033 (P)
- September 12, 2034 (P)
- July 2, 2038 (P)
- June 21, 2039 (P)
- November 4, 2040 (P)
- August 22, 2044 (P)
- August 12, 2045 (T)
- February 5, 2046 (P)
- June 11, 2048 (P)
- March 30, 2052 (T) †
- September 2, 2054 (P) †
- January 27, 2055 (P)
- January 16, 2056 (A)
- July 12, 2056 (P)
- July 1, 2057 (P)
- May 11, 2059 (P)
- August 12, 2064 (P)
- June 22, 2066 (P)
- June 11, 2067 (P)
- December 6, 2067 (P)
- November 24, 2068 (P)
- September 23, 2071 (P)
- November 15, 2077 (A)
- May 11, 2078 (T)
- November 4, 2078 (P)
- February 27, 2082 (P)
- February 16, 2083 (P)
- July 3, 2084 (P)
- December 16, 2085 (P)
- April 10, 2089 (P)
- September 23, 2090 (P)
- February 7, 2092 (P)
- July 23, 2093 (P)
- December 7, 2094 (P)
- September 25, 2098 (P)
- March 21, 2099 (P)
- September 14, 2099 (P)
- March 10, 2100 (P)

== Utah ==
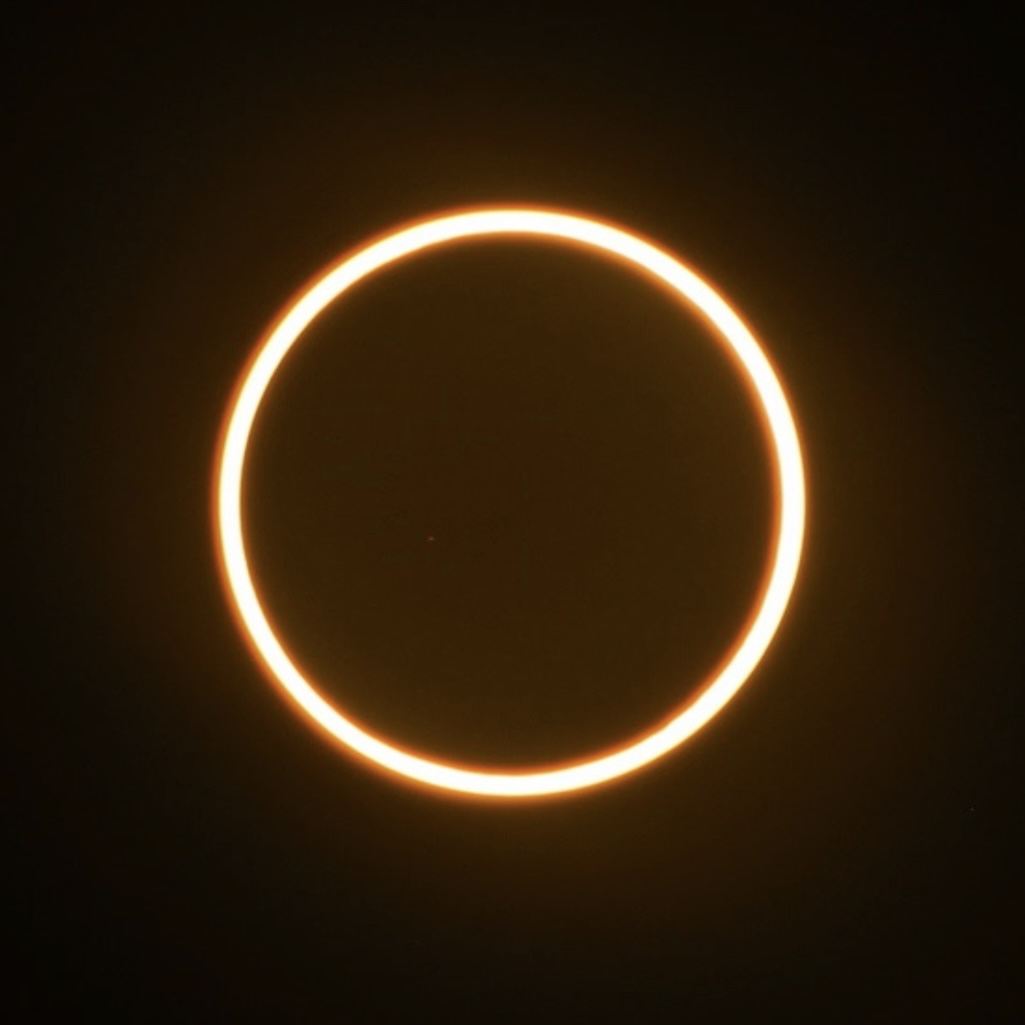
A view of the solar eclipse on October 14, 2023 from Mexican Hat, Utah, during annularity

From 1900 to 2100, the state of Utah will have recorded a total of 93 solar eclipses, four of which are annular eclipses and two of which are total eclipses. Two of the annular solar eclipses occurred on May 20, 2012 and October 14, 2023, respectively, and the remaining two will occur on November 15, 2077 and July 3, 2084. One of the total solar eclipses occurred on June 8, 1918, and the remaining one will occur on August 12, 2045.

The most recent total solar eclipse in Utah was on June 8, 1918; the most recent annular solar eclipse was on October 14, 2023; and the most recent partial solar eclipse was on April 8, 2024. The next total solar eclipse in Utah will occur on August 12, 2045; the next annular solar eclipse will occur on November 15, 2077; and the next partial solar eclipse will occur on January 26, 2028.

- August 20, 1906 (P)
- January 3, 1908 (P)
- June 28, 1908 (P)
- June 17, 1909 (P)
- April 28, 1911 (P)
- February 3, 1916 (P)
- June 8, 1918 (T)
- November 22, 1919 (P)
- November 10, 1920 (P) †
- September 10, 1923 (P)
- January 24, 1925 (P)
- July 9, 1926 (P)
- April 28, 1930 (P)
- August 31, 1932 (P)
- February 3, 1935 (P)
- June 8, 1937 (P)
- December 2, 1937 (P)
- November 21, 1938 (P) †
- April 19, 1939 (P)
- April 7, 1940 (P)
- February 4, 1943 (P)
- July 9, 1945 (P)
- November 23, 1946 (P)
- November 12, 1947 (P)
- March 7, 1951 (P) †
- June 30, 1954 (P)
- April 30, 1957 (P)
- September 20, 1960 (P)
- February 5, 1962 (P)
- July 20, 1963 (P)
- May 9, 1967 (P)
- September 11, 1969 (P)
- March 7, 1970 (P)
- July 10, 1972 (P)
- December 24, 1973 (P)
- December 13, 1974 (P)
- October 12, 1977 (P)
- February 26, 1979 (P)
- August 10, 1980 (P)
- May 30, 1984 (P)
- October 3, 1986 (P)
- March 7, 1989 (P)
- July 22, 1990 (P)
- July 11, 1991 (P)
- January 4, 1992 (P)
- May 21, 1993 (P)
- May 10, 1994 (P)
- July 31, 2000 (P)
- December 25, 2000 (P)
- December 14, 2001 (P)
- June 10, 2002 (P)
- May 20, 2012 (A)
- October 23, 2014 (P)
- August 21, 2017 (P)
- October 14, 2023 (A)
- April 8, 2024 (P)
- → January 26, 2028 (P)
- January 14, 2029 (P)
- November 14, 2031 (P)
- March 30, 2033 (P)
- June 21, 2039 (P)
- November 4, 2040 (P)
- April 9, 2043 (P)
- August 22, 2044 (P)
- August 12, 2045 (T)
- February 5, 2046 (P)
- June 11, 2048 (P)
- March 30, 2052 (P)
- September 2, 2054 (P)
- January 27, 2055 (P)
- January 16, 2056 (P)
- July 12, 2056 (P)
- July 1, 2057 (P)
- June 22, 2066 (P)
- June 11, 2067 (P)
- November 24, 2068 (P)
- September 23, 2071 (P)
- November 15, 2077 (A)
- May 11, 2078 (P)
- November 4, 2078 (P)
- February 27, 2082 (P) †
- February 16, 2083 (P)
- July 3, 2084 (A)
- December 16, 2085 (P)
- September 23, 2090 (P)
- February 7, 2092 (P)
- December 7, 2094 (P)
- May 22, 2096 (P)
- May 11, 2097 (P)
- September 25, 2098 (P)
- March 21, 2099 (P)
- September 14, 2099 (P)
- March 10, 2100 (P)

== Vermont ==
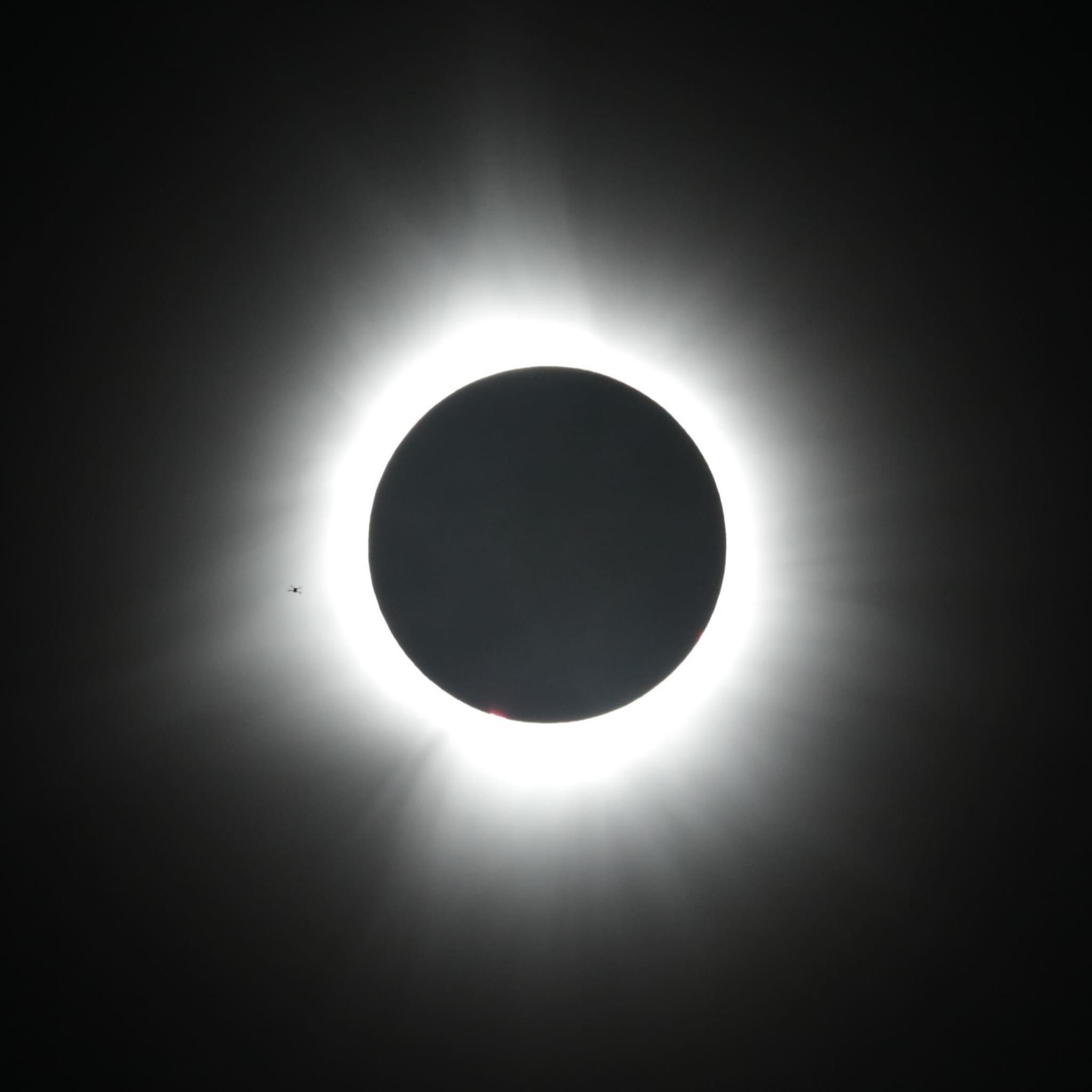
A view of the solar eclipse on April 8, 2024 from Newport, Vermont, during totality

From 1900 to 2100, the state of Vermont will have recorded a total of 79 solar eclipses, two of which are annular eclipses and four of which are total eclipses. One annular solar eclipse occurred on May 10, 1994, and the other will occur on July 23, 2093. Three of the total solar eclipses occurred on August 31, 1932; October 2, 1959; and April 8, 2024, respectively, and the remaining one will occur on May 1, 2079.

The most recent total solar eclipse in Vermont was on April 8, 2024; the most recent annular solar eclipse was on May 10, 1994; and the most recent partial solar eclipse was on August 12, 2026. The next total solar eclipse in Vermont will occur on May 1, 2079; the next annular solar eclipse will occur on July 23, 2093; and the next partial solar eclipse will occur on January 26, 2028.

- August 30, 1905 (P)
- June 28, 1908 (P)
- June 17, 1909 (P)
- April 17, 1912 (P)
- August 21, 1914 (P)
- February 3, 1916 (P)
- June 8, 1918 (P)
- November 22, 1919 (P)
- November 10, 1920 (P)
- September 10, 1923 (P)
- January 24, 1925 (P)
- April 28, 1930 (P)
- August 31, 1932 (T)
- February 3, 1935 (P)
- April 19, 1939 (P)
- April 7, 1940 (P)
- July 9, 1945 (P)
- November 23, 1946 (P)
- November 12, 1947 (P) †
- March 7, 1951 (P)
- September 1, 1951 (P)
- June 30, 1954 (P)
- October 2, 1959 (T)
- July 20, 1963 (P)
- May 9, 1967 (P)
- March 7, 1970 (P)
- July 10, 1972 (P)
- December 24, 1973 (P)
- December 13, 1974 (P)
- April 29, 1976 (P)
- October 12, 1977 (P)
- February 26, 1979 (P)
- May 30, 1984 (P)
- October 3, 1986 (P)
- July 11, 1991 (P)
- May 10, 1994 (A)
- February 26, 1998 (P)
- August 11, 1999 (P)
- December 25, 2000 (P)
- December 14, 2001 (P)
- June 10, 2002 (P)
- May 20, 2012 (P)
- November 3, 2013 (P)
- October 23, 2014 (P)
- August 21, 2017 (P)
- June 10, 2021 (P)
- October 14, 2023 (P)
- April 8, 2024 (T)
- March 29, 2025 (P)
- August 12, 2026 (P)
- → January 26, 2028 (P)
- January 14, 2029 (P)
- March 30, 2033 (P)
- August 21, 2036 (P) †
- January 5, 2038 (P)
- July 2, 2038 (P)
- June 21, 2039 (P)
- November 4, 2040 (P)
- August 12, 2045 (P)
- June 11, 2048 (P)
- November 14, 2050 (P)
- March 30, 2052 (P)
- January 27, 2055 (P)
- July 1, 2057 (P)
- June 22, 2066 (P)
- December 6, 2067 (P)
- April 21, 2069 (P)
- September 23, 2071 (P)
- November 15, 2077 (P)
- May 11, 2078 (P)
- May 1, 2079 (T)
- February 27, 2082 (P)
- February 16, 2083 (P)
- April 21, 2088 (P)
- September 23, 2090 (P)
- February 7, 2092 (P)
- July 23, 2093 (A)
- December 7, 2094 (P)
- September 14, 2099 (P)

== Virginia ==
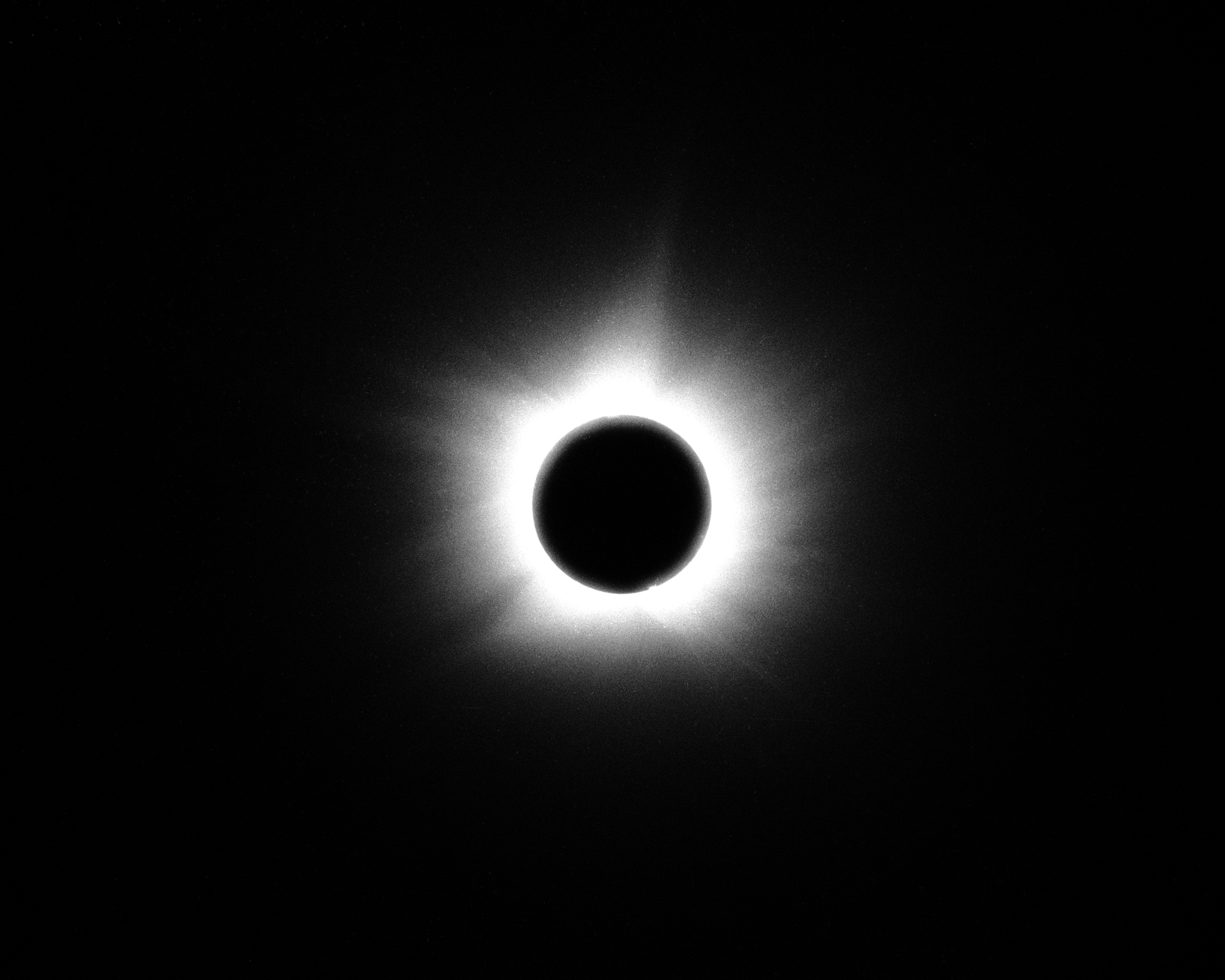
A view of the solar eclipse on March 7, 1970 from Virginia Beach, Virginia, during totality

From 1900 to 2100, the state of Virginia will have recorded a total of 84 solar eclipses, two of which are annular eclipses and three of which are total eclipses. Both annular solar eclipses occurred on September 1, 1951 and May 30, 1984, respectively. One of the total solar eclipses occurred on March 7, 1970, and the remaining two will occur on May 11, 2078 and September 14, 2099.

The most recent total solar eclipse in Virginia was on March 7, 1970; the most recent annular solar eclipse was on May 30, 1984; and the most recent partial solar eclipse was on August 12, 2026. The next total solar eclipse in Virginia will occur on May 11, 2078, and the next partial solar eclipse will occur on January 26, 2028.

- August 30, 1905 (P)
- June 28, 1908 (P)
- June 17, 1909 (P)
- April 28, 1911 (P)
- April 17, 1912 (P)
- August 21, 1914 (P)
- February 3, 1916 (P)
- June 8, 1918 (P)
- November 22, 1919 (P)
- November 10, 1920 (P)
- September 10, 1923 (P)
- January 24, 1925 (P)
- April 28, 1930 (P)
- August 31, 1932 (P)
- February 3, 1935 (P)
- April 19, 1939 (P)
- April 7, 1940 (P)
- July 9, 1945 (P)
- November 23, 1946 (P)
- November 12, 1947 (P)
- March 7, 1951 (P)
- September 1, 1951 (A)
- June 30, 1954 (P)
- October 2, 1959 (P)
- September 20, 1960 (P)
- July 20, 1963 (P)
- May 9, 1967 (P)
- September 11, 1969 (P)
- March 7, 1970 (T)
- July 10, 1972 (P)
- December 24, 1973 (P)
- December 13, 1974 (P)
- October 12, 1977 (P)
- February 26, 1979 (P)
- May 30, 1984 (A)
- October 3, 1986 (P)
- July 11, 1991 (P)
- May 10, 1994 (P)
- February 26, 1998 (P)
- August 11, 1999 (P)
- December 25, 2000 (P)
- December 14, 2001 (P)
- June 10, 2002 (P)
- April 8, 2005 (P)
- May 20, 2012 (P)
- November 3, 2013 (P)
- October 23, 2014 (P)
- August 21, 2017 (P)
- June 10, 2021 (P)
- October 14, 2023 (P)
- April 8, 2024 (P)
- March 29, 2025 (P)
- August 12, 2026 (P)
- → January 26, 2028 (P)
- January 14, 2029 (P)
- November 14, 2031 (P)
- March 30, 2033 (P)
- January 5, 2038 (P)
- July 2, 2038 (P)
- June 21, 2039 (P) †
- November 4, 2040 (P)
- August 12, 2045 (P)
- June 11, 2048 (P)
- November 14, 2050 (P)
- March 30, 2052 (P)
- January 27, 2055 (P)
- July 12, 2056 (P)
- July 1, 2057 (P)
- June 22, 2066 (P)
- June 11, 2067 (P)
- December 6, 2067 (P)
- November 24, 2068 (P)
- September 23, 2071 (P)
- November 15, 2077 (P)
- May 11, 2078 (T)
- May 1, 2079 (P)
- February 27, 2082 (P)
- February 16, 2083 (P)
- September 23, 2090 (P)
- February 7, 2092 (P)
- July 23, 2093 (P)
- December 7, 2094 (P)
- September 14, 2099 (T)
- March 10, 2100 (P)

== Washington ==
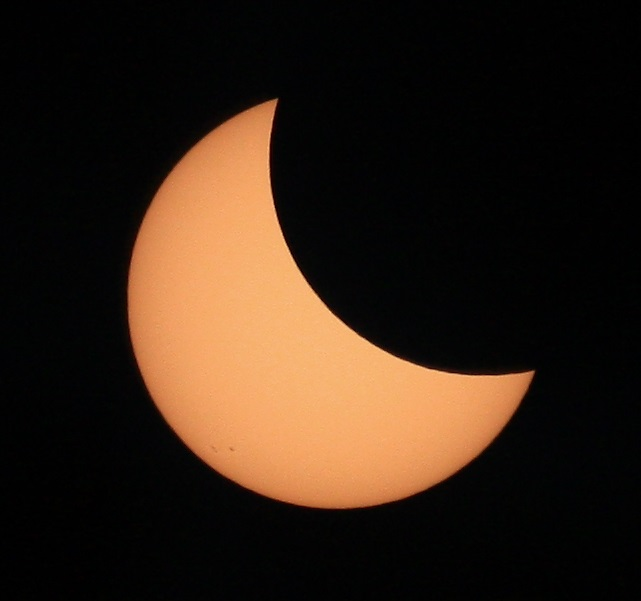
A view of the solar eclipse on August 21, 2017 from Seattle, Washington, during its partial phase

From 1900 to 2100, the state of Washington will have recorded a total of 91 solar eclipses, two of which are annular eclipses and two of which are total eclipses. Both of the annular solar eclipses will occur on November 15, 2077 and July 3, 2084. Both of the total solar eclipses occurred on June 8, 1918 and February 26, 1979.

The most recent total solar eclipse in Washington was on February 26, 1979, and the most recent partial solar eclipse was on April 8, 2024. The next annular solar eclipse will occur on November 15, 2077; and the next partial solar eclipse will occur on January 14, 2029.

- March 29, 1903 (P)
- August 20, 1906 (P)
- June 28, 1908 (P)
- June 17, 1909 (P)
- April 28, 1911 (P) †
- April 6, 1913 (P)
- February 3, 1916 (P)
- June 19, 1917 (P)
- June 8, 1918 (T)
- November 10, 1920 (P)
- September 10, 1923 (P)
- July 9, 1926 (P)
- April 28, 1930 (P)
- August 31, 1932 (P)
- February 14, 1934 (P)
- February 3, 1935 (P)
- December 2, 1937 (P)
- November 21, 1938 (P)
- April 19, 1939 (P)
- April 7, 1940 (P)
- February 4, 1943 (P)
- July 9, 1945 (P)
- November 23, 1946 (P)
- November 12, 1947 (P)
- May 9, 1948 (P)
- July 11, 1953 (P)
- June 30, 1954 (P)
- April 30, 1957 (P)
- September 20, 1960 (P)
- February 5, 1962 (P)
- July 20, 1963 (P)
- May 9, 1967 (P)
- September 11, 1969 (P)
- March 7, 1970 (P)
- July 10, 1972 (P)
- December 13, 1974 (P)
- October 12, 1977 (P)
- February 26, 1979 (T)
- July 31, 1981 (P) †
- May 30, 1984 (P)
- October 3, 1986 (P)
- March 7, 1989 (P)
- July 22, 1990 (P)
- July 11, 1991 (P)
- January 4, 1992 (P)
- May 21, 1993 (P)
- May 10, 1994 (P)
- July 31, 2000 (P)
- December 25, 2000 (P)
- December 14, 2001 (P)
- June 10, 2002 (P)
- May 20, 2012 (P)
- October 23, 2014 (P)
- August 21, 2017 (P)
- October 14, 2023 (P)
- April 8, 2024 (P)
- → January 14, 2029 (P)
- March 30, 2033 (P)
- September 2, 2035 (P)
- June 21, 2039 (P)
- November 4, 2040 (P)
- April 20, 2042 (P)
- April 9, 2043 (P)
- August 22, 2044 (P)
- August 12, 2045 (P)
- February 5, 2046 (P)
- June 11, 2048 (P)
- March 30, 2052 (P)
- September 2, 2054 (P)
- January 27, 2055 (P)
- January 16, 2056 (P)
- July 12, 2056 (P)
- July 1, 2057 (P)
- June 22, 2066 (P)
- June 11, 2067 (P)
- November 24, 2068 (P)
- September 23, 2071 (P)
- November 15, 2077 (A) †
- May 11, 2078 (P)
- February 16, 2083 (P)
- July 3, 2084 (A)
- December 16, 2085 (P)
- May 2, 2087 (P)
- September 23, 2090 (P)
- July 12, 2094 (P)
- December 7, 2094 (P)
- May 22, 2096 (P)
- May 11, 2097 (P)
- September 25, 2098 (P)
- September 14, 2099 (P)
- March 10, 2100 (P)

== West Virginia ==
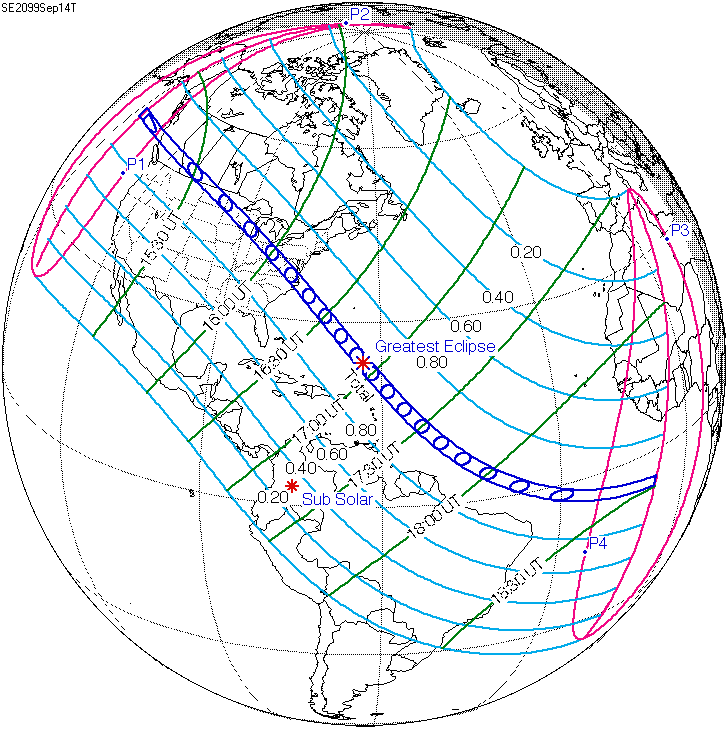
The path of the next total solar eclipse to cross West Virginia on September 14, 2099

From 1900 to 2100, the state of West Virginia will have recorded a total of 84 solar eclipses, one of which is an annular eclipse and one of which is a total eclipse. The one annular solar eclipse will occur on July 23, 2093, and the one total solar eclipse will occur on September 14, 2099.

The most recent partial solar eclipse was on August 12, 2026. The next total solar eclipse in West Virginia will occur on September 14, 2099; the next annular solar eclipse will occur on July 23, 2093; and the next partial solar eclipse will occur on January 26, 2028.

- August 30, 1905 (P)
- June 28, 1908 (P)
- June 17, 1909 (P)
- April 28, 1911 (P)
- April 17, 1912 (P)
- August 21, 1914 (P)
- February 3, 1916 (P)
- June 8, 1918 (P)
- November 22, 1919 (P)
- November 10, 1920 (P)
- September 10, 1923 (P)
- January 24, 1925 (P)
- April 28, 1930 (P)
- August 31, 1932 (P)
- February 3, 1935 (P)
- April 19, 1939 (P)
- April 7, 1940 (P)
- July 9, 1945 (P)
- November 23, 1946 (P)
- November 12, 1947 (P)
- March 7, 1951 (P)
- September 1, 1951 (P)
- June 30, 1954 (P)
- October 2, 1959 (P)
- September 20, 1960 (P)
- July 20, 1963 (P)
- May 9, 1967 (P)
- September 11, 1969 (P)
- March 7, 1970 (P)
- July 10, 1972 (P)
- December 24, 1973 (P)
- December 13, 1974 (P)
- October 12, 1977 (P)
- February 26, 1979 (P)
- May 30, 1984 (P)
- October 3, 1986 (P)
- July 11, 1991 (P)
- May 10, 1994 (P)
- February 26, 1998 (P)
- August 11, 1999 (P) †
- December 25, 2000 (P)
- December 14, 2001 (P)
- June 10, 2002 (P)
- April 8, 2005 (P)
- May 20, 2012 (P)
- November 3, 2013 (P)
- October 23, 2014 (P)
- August 21, 2017 (P)
- June 10, 2021 (P)
- October 14, 2023 (P)
- April 8, 2024 (P)
- March 29, 2025 (P)
- August 12, 2026 (P)
- → January 26, 2028 (P)
- January 14, 2029 (P)
- November 14, 2031 (P)
- March 30, 2033 (P)
- January 5, 2038 (P)
- July 2, 2038 (P)
- June 21, 2039 (P)
- November 4, 2040 (P)
- August 12, 2045 (P)
- June 11, 2048 (P)
- November 14, 2050 (P)
- March 30, 2052 (P)
- January 27, 2055 (P)
- July 12, 2056 (P)
- July 1, 2057 (P)
- June 22, 2066 (P)
- June 11, 2067 (P)
- December 6, 2067 (P)
- November 24, 2068 (P)
- September 23, 2071 (P)
- November 15, 2077 (P)
- May 11, 2078 (P)
- May 1, 2079 (P)
- February 27, 2082 (P)
- February 16, 2083 (P)
- September 23, 2090 (P)
- February 7, 2092 (P)
- July 23, 2093 (A) †
- December 7, 2094 (P)
- September 14, 2099 (T)
- March 10, 2100 (P)

== Wisconsin ==
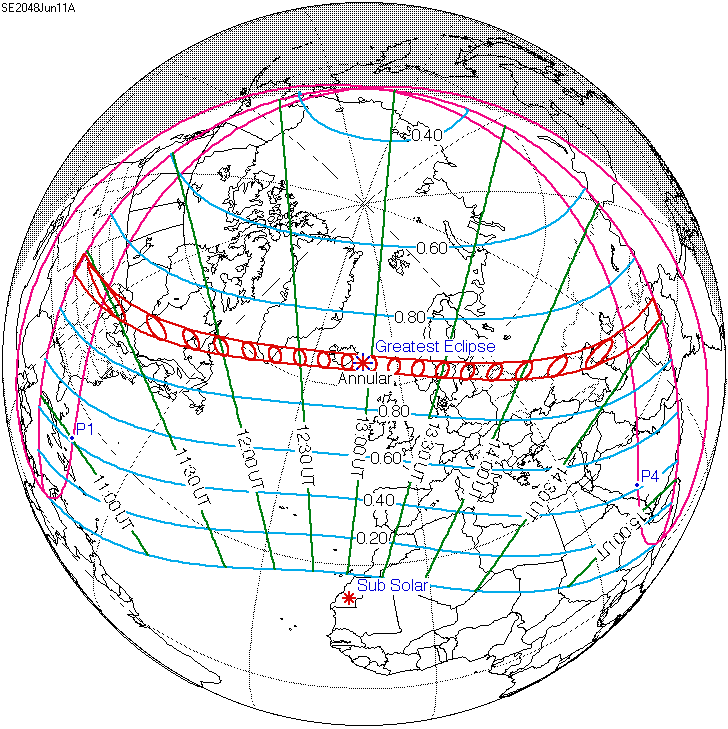
The path of the next annular solar eclipse to cross Wisconsin on June 11, 2048

From 1900 to 2100, the state of Wisconsin will have recorded a total of 83 solar eclipses, one of which is an annular eclipse and three of which are total eclipses. The one annular solar eclipse will occur on June 11, 2048. Two of the total solar eclipses occurred on January 24, 1925 and June 30, 1954, and the remaining one will occur on September 14, 2099.

The most recent total solar eclipse in Wisconsin was on June 30, 1954, and the most recent partial solar eclipse was on August 12, 2026. The next total solar eclipse in Wisconsin will occur on September 14, 2099; the next annular solar eclipse will occur on June 11, 2048; and the next partial solar eclipse will occur on January 26, 2028.

- August 30, 1905 (P)
- June 28, 1908 (P)
- June 17, 1909 (P)
- April 28, 1911 (P)
- April 17, 1912 (P)
- August 21, 1914 (P)
- February 3, 1916 (P)
- June 8, 1918 (P)
- November 22, 1919 (P)
- November 10, 1920 (P)
- September 10, 1923 (P)
- January 24, 1925 (T)
- April 28, 1930 (P)
- August 31, 1932 (P)
- February 3, 1935 (P)
- April 19, 1939 (P)
- April 7, 1940 (P)
- July 9, 1945 (P)
- November 23, 1946 (P)
- November 12, 1947 (P)
- March 7, 1951 (P)
- September 1, 1951 (P)
- June 30, 1954 (T)
- April 30, 1957 (P)
- October 2, 1959 (P) †
- September 20, 1960 (P)
- July 20, 1963 (P)
- May 9, 1967 (P)
- September 11, 1969 (P)
- March 7, 1970 (P)
- July 10, 1972 (P)
- December 24, 1973 (P)
- December 13, 1974 (P)
- October 12, 1977 (P)
- February 26, 1979 (P)
- May 30, 1984 (P)
- October 3, 1986 (P)
- March 7, 1989 (P)
- July 11, 1991 (P)
- May 21, 1993 (P)
- May 10, 1994 (P)
- February 26, 1998 (P)
- December 25, 2000 (P)
- December 14, 2001 (P)
- June 10, 2002 (P)
- May 20, 2012 (P)
- October 23, 2014 (P)
- August 21, 2017 (P)
- June 10, 2021 (P)
- October 14, 2023 (P)
- April 8, 2024 (P)
- August 12, 2026 (P)
- → January 26, 2028 (P)
- January 14, 2029 (P)
- November 14, 2031 (P)
- March 30, 2033 (P)
- June 21, 2039 (P)
- November 4, 2040 (P)
- August 22, 2044 (P)
- August 12, 2045 (P)
- June 11, 2048 (A)
- March 30, 2052 (P)
- January 27, 2055 (P)
- January 16, 2056 (P)
- July 12, 2056 (P)
- July 1, 2057 (P)
- June 22, 2066 (P)
- June 11, 2067 (P)
- December 6, 2067 (P)
- November 24, 2068 (P)
- September 23, 2071 (P)
- November 15, 2077 (P)
- May 11, 2078 (P)
- May 1, 2079 (P)
- February 16, 2083 (P)
- July 3, 2084 (P)
- September 23, 2090 (P)
- February 7, 2092 (P)
- July 23, 2093 (P)
- December 7, 2094 (P)
- May 11, 2097 (P)
- September 14, 2099 (T)
- March 10, 2100 (P)

== Wyoming ==
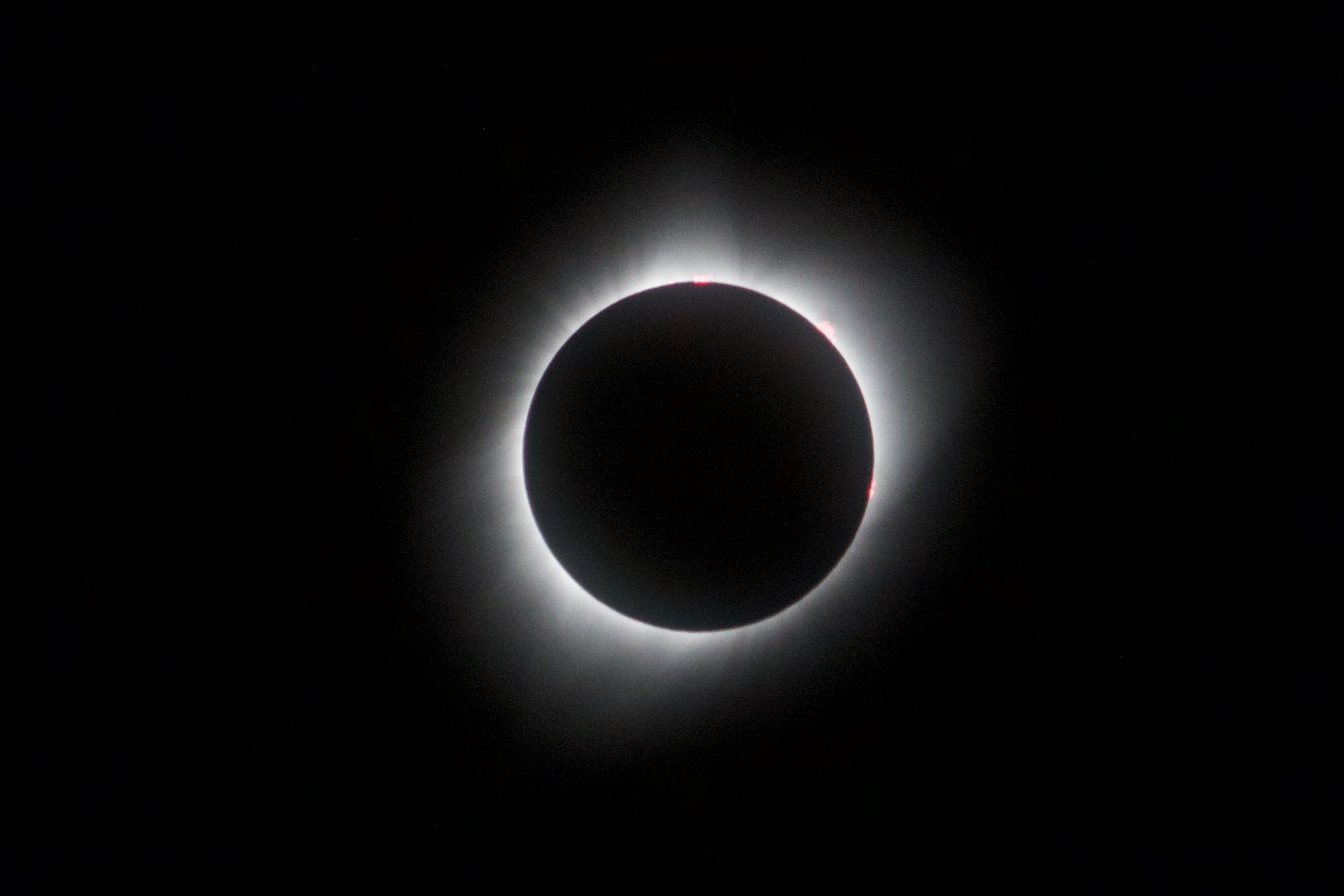
A view of the solar eclipse on August 21, 2017 from Glenrock, Wyoming, during totality

From 1900 to 2100, the state of Wyoming will have recorded a total of 85 solar eclipses, two of which are annular eclipses and two of which are total eclipses. Both of annular solar eclipses will occur on July 3, 2084 and March 10, 2100, respectively. Both of the total solar eclipses occurred on June 8, 1918 and August 21, 2017, respectively.

The most recent total solar eclipse in Wyoming was on August 21, 2017, and the most recent partial solar eclipse was on April 8, 2024. The next annular solar eclipse will occur on July 3, 2084; and the next partial solar eclipse will occur on January 26, 2028.

- August 30, 1905 (P)
- August 20, 1906 (P)
- June 28, 1908 (P)
- June 17, 1909 (P)
- April 28, 1911 (P)
- February 3, 1916 (P)
- June 8, 1918 (T)
- November 22, 1919 (P)
- November 10, 1920 (P)
- September 10, 1923 (P)
- January 24, 1925 (P)
- July 9, 1926 (P)
- April 28, 1930 (P)
- August 31, 1932 (P)
- February 3, 1935 (P)
- December 2, 1937 (P)
- April 19, 1939 (P)
- April 7, 1940 (P)
- February 4, 1943 (P)
- July 9, 1945 (P)
- November 23, 1946 (P)
- November 12, 1947 (P)
- June 30, 1954 (P)
- April 30, 1957 (P)
- September 20, 1960 (P)
- July 20, 1963 (P)
- May 9, 1967 (P)
- September 11, 1969 (P)
- March 7, 1970 (P)
- July 10, 1972 (P)
- December 24, 1973 (P)
- December 13, 1974 (P)
- October 12, 1977 (P)
- February 26, 1979 (P)
- May 30, 1984 (P)
- October 3, 1986 (P)
- March 7, 1989 (P)
- July 22, 1990 (P)
- July 11, 1991 (P)
- January 4, 1992 (P)
- May 21, 1993 (P)
- May 10, 1994 (P)
- July 31, 2000 (P)
- December 25, 2000 (P)
- December 14, 2001 (P)
- June 10, 2002 (P)
- May 20, 2012 (P)
- October 23, 2014 (P)
- August 21, 2017 (T)
- October 14, 2023 (P)
- April 8, 2024 (P)
- → January 26, 2028 (P)
- January 14, 2029 (P)
- March 30, 2033 (P)
- June 21, 2039 (P)
- November 4, 2040 (P)
- April 9, 2043 (P)
- August 22, 2044 (P)
- August 12, 2045 (P)
- February 5, 2046 (P)
- June 11, 2048 (P)
- March 30, 2052 (P)
- September 2, 2054 (P)
- January 27, 2055 (P)
- January 16, 2056 (P)
- July 12, 2056 (P)
- July 1, 2057 (P)
- June 22, 2066 (P)
- June 11, 2067 (P)
- November 24, 2068 (P)
- September 23, 2071 (P)
- November 15, 2077 (P)
- May 11, 2078 (P)
- February 16, 2083 (P)
- July 3, 2084 (A)
- December 16, 2085 (P)
- September 23, 2090 (P)
- February 7, 2092 (P)
- July 23, 2093 (P)
- December 7, 2094 (P)
- May 22, 2096 (P)
- May 11, 2097 (P)
- September 25, 2098 (P)
- September 14, 2099 (P)
- March 10, 2100 (A)

== Notable eclipses ==
- The solar eclipse that occurred on April 28, 1930 was the last hybrid eclipse in the United States that will occur until March 22, 2164.
- The solar eclipses on June 8, 1918; May 10, 1994; August 21, 2017; October 14, 2023; April 8, 2024; August 12, 2045; and September 14, 2099 each have long paths stretching from coast to coast.
- The 2024 eclipse is the only total solar eclipse of the 21st century to pass through the United States, Canada, and Mexico.
- The 2045 eclipse will be the longest total eclipse to cross the United States in the 21st century. It will last up to 6 minutes and 6 seconds.

== 1900–1950 ==
| June 28, 1908 Annular | June 8, 1918 Total | November 22, 1919 Annular | September 10, 1923 Total |
| January 24, 1925 Total | June 29, 1927 Total | April 28, 1930 Hybrid | August 31, 1932 Total |
| April 19, 1939 Annular | April 7, 1940 Annular | February 4, 1943 Total | July 9, 1945 Total |
| May 9, 1948 Annular | September 12, 1950 Total | | |

== 1951–2000 ==
| September 1, 1951 Annular | June 30, 1954 Total | October 2, 1959 Total | July 20, 1963 Total |
| March 7, 1970 Total | July 10, 1972 Total | February 26, 1979 Total | May 30, 1984 Annular |
| July 22, 1990 Total | July 11, 1991 Total | January 4, 1992 Annular | May 10, 1994 Annular |

== 2001–2050 ==
| May 20, 2012 Annular | August 21, 2017 Total | October 14, 2023 Annular | April 8, 2024 Total |
| March 30, 2033 Total | June 21, 2039 Annular | August 23, 2044 Total | August 12, 2045 Total |
| February 5, 2046 Annular | June 11, 2048 Annular | | |

== 2051–2100 ==
| March 30, 2052 Total | January 16, 2056 Annular | July 1, 2057 Annular | June 22, 2066 Annular |
| November 15, 2077 Annular | May 11, 2078 Total | May 1, 2079 Total | July 3, 2084 Annular |
| July 23, 2093 Annular | May 11, 2097 Total | September 14, 2099 Total | March 10, 2100 Annular |
