= Solar eclipse of August 7, 1869 =

Total eclipse

- Total eclipse
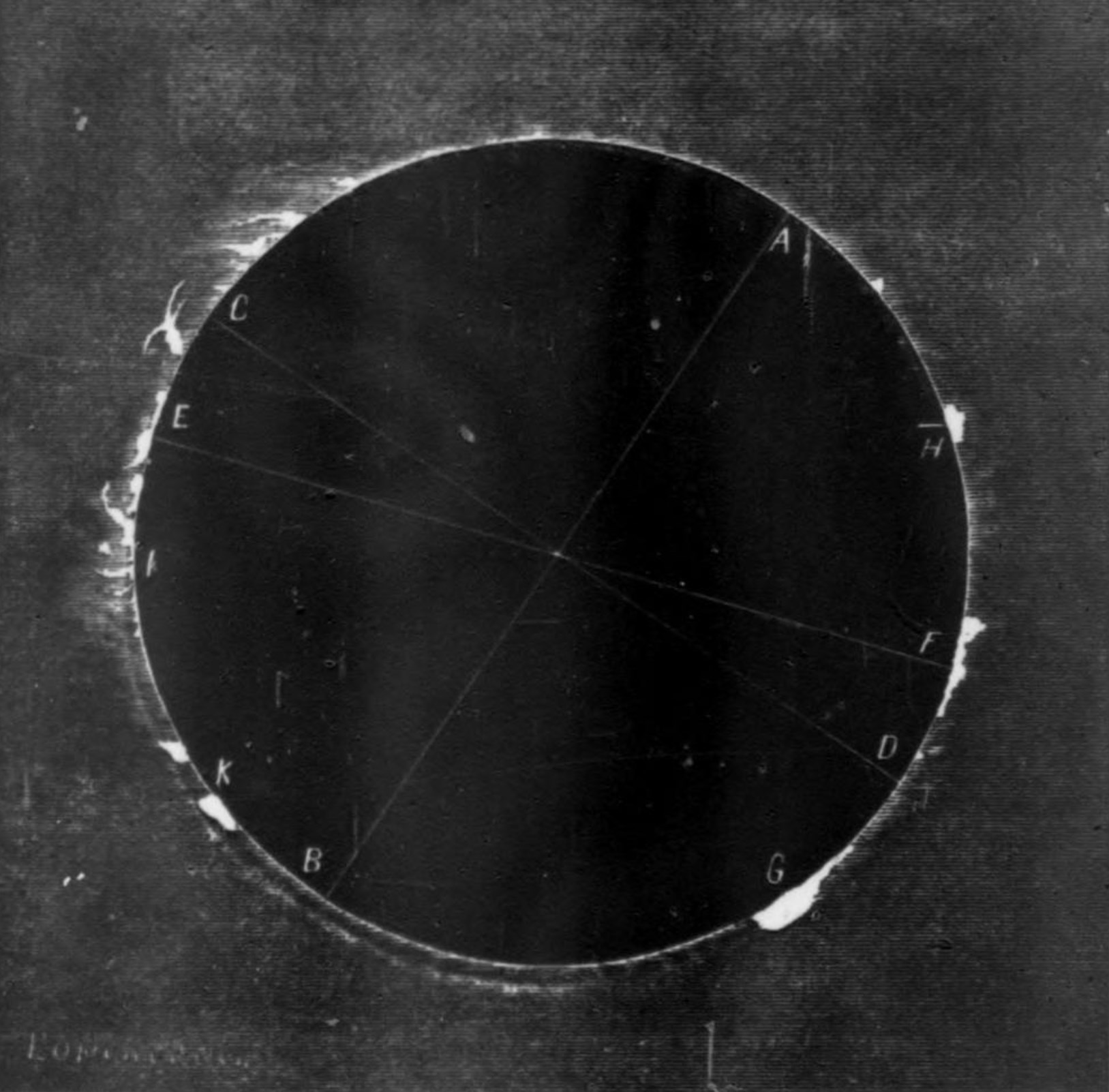
- Totality photographed by Morton's party in Iowa

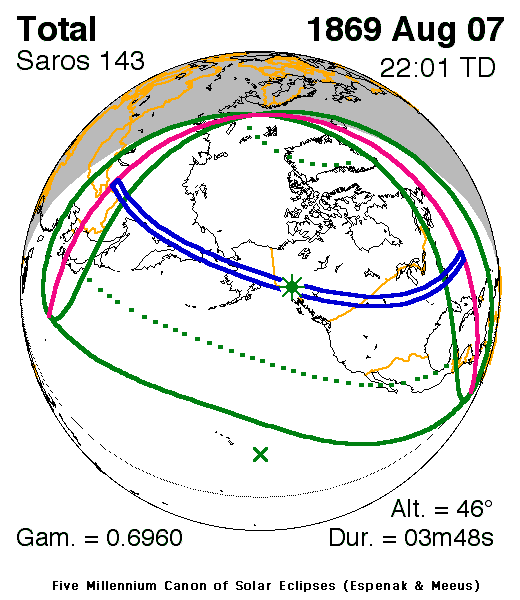
- Map
- Gamma: 0.696
- Magnitude: 1.0551

Maximum eclipse
- Duration: 228 s (3 min 48 s)
- Coordinates: 59.1°N 133.2°W
- Max. width of band: 254 km (158 mi)

Times (UTC)
- Greatest eclipse: 22:01:05

References
- Saros: 143 (15 of 72)
- Catalog # (SE5000): 9209

A total solar eclipse occurred at the Moon's ascending node of orbit between Saturday, August 7, and Sunday, August 8, 1869, with a magnitude of 1.0551. A solar eclipse occurs when the Moon passes between Earth and the Sun, thereby totally or partly obscuring the image of the Sun for a viewer on Earth. A total solar eclipse occurs when the Moon's apparent diameter is larger than the Sun's, blocking all direct sunlight, turning day into darkness. Totality occurs in a narrow path across Earth's surface, with the partial solar eclipse visible over a surrounding region thousands of kilometres wide. Occurring about 1.6 days before perigee (on August 9, 1869, at 13:20 UTC), the Moon's apparent diameter was larger.

The path of totality was visible from parts of modern-day eastern Russia, Alaska, western Canada, Montana, North Dakota, South Dakota, Minnesota, Nebraska, Iowa, Missouri, Illinois, Indiana, Kentucky, Tennessee, West Virginia, Virginia, North Carolina, and South Carolina. A partial solar eclipse was also visible for parts of Northeast Asia, North America, Central America, and the Caribbean.

== Observations ==
This eclipse was the first major eclipse photographed and also included many different scientific expeditions to view it across totality.

Maria Mitchell took a group of Vassar College students to view the eclipse with telescopes in Burlington, Iowa.

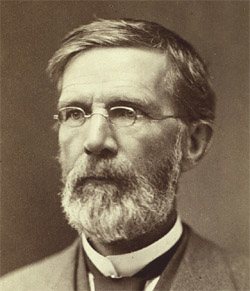
George Davidson

In 1869, astronomer and explorer George Davidson made a scientific trip to the Chilkat Valley of Alaska, to observe the eclipse; he was aided in his journey by Tlingit chief Kohklux (or Shotridge).

A photographic expedition was organized by Philadelphia's Henry Morton under the authority of John H. C. Coffin, U.S.N., Superintendent of the American Ephemeris and Nautical Almanac. The expedition observed the eclipse in Iowa at three stations: Burlington, Mount Pleasant, and Ottumwa, under the respective supervisions of Alfred M. Mayer, Henry Morton, and Charles Francis Himes (1838–1918).

Observations were also made by meteorology pioneers Cleveland Abbe and General Albert Myer, in Dakota Territory and Virginia, respectively.

== Eclipse details ==
Shown below are two tables displaying details about this particular solar eclipse. The first table outlines times at which the Moon's penumbra or umbra attains the specific parameter, and the second table describes various other parameters pertaining to this eclipse.

August 7, 1869 Solar Eclipse Times
Event	Time (UTC)
First Penumbral External Contact	1869 August 7 at 19:38:08.9 UTC
First Umbral External Contact	1869 August 7 at 20:44:43.8 UTC
First Central Line	1869 August 7 at 20:46:19.1 UTC
First Umbral Internal Contact	1869 August 7 at 20:47:55.4 UTC
Equatorial Conjunction	1869 August 7 at 21:46:10.8 UTC
Greatest Duration	1869 August 7 at 22:00:53.7 UTC
Greatest Eclipse	1869 August 7 at 22:01:04.7 UTC
Ecliptic Conjunction	1869 August 7 at 22:08:11.2 UTC
Last Umbral Internal Contact	1869 August 7 at 23:14:22.8 UTC
Last Central Line	1869 August 7 at 23:16:00.7 UTC
Last Umbral External Contact	1869 August 7 at 23:17:37.6 UTC
Last Penumbral External Contact	1869 August 8 at 00:24:03.9 UTC

August 7, 1869 Solar Eclipse Parameters
Parameter	Value
Eclipse Magnitude	1.05514
Eclipse Obscuration	1.11332
Gamma	0.69599
Sun Right Ascension	09h11m15.8s
Sun Declination	+16°14'37.3"
Sun Semi-Diameter	15'46.6"
Sun Equatorial Horizontal Parallax	08.7"
Moon Right Ascension	09h11m50.9s
Moon Declination	+16°55'41.0"
Moon Semi-Diameter	16'27.0"
Moon Equatorial Horizontal Parallax	1°00'22.4"
ΔT	1.2 s

== Eclipse season ==
This eclipse is part of an eclipse season, a period, roughly every six months, when eclipses occur. Only two (or occasionally three) eclipse seasons occur each year, and each season lasts about 35 days and repeats just short of six months (173 days) later; thus two full eclipse seasons always occur each year. Either two or three eclipses happen each eclipse season. In the sequence below, each eclipse is separated by a fortnight.

Eclipse season of July–August 1869
July 23 Descending node (full moon)	August 7 Ascending node (new moon)
Partial lunar eclipse Lunar Saros 117	Total solar eclipse Solar Saros 143

== Related eclipses ==
=== Eclipses in 1869 ===
- A partial lunar eclipse on January 28.
- An annular solar eclipse on February 11.
- A partial lunar eclipse on July 23.
- A total solar eclipse on August 7.

=== Metonic ===
- Preceded by: Solar eclipse of October 19, 1865
- Followed by: Solar eclipse of May 26, 1873

=== Tzolkinex ===
- Preceded by: Solar eclipse of June 27, 1862
- Followed by: Solar eclipse of September 17, 1876

=== Half-Saros ===
- Preceded by: Lunar eclipse of August 1, 1860
- Followed by: Lunar eclipse of August 13, 1878

=== Tritos ===
- Preceded by: Solar eclipse of September 7, 1858
- Followed by: Solar eclipse of July 7, 1880

=== Solar Saros 143 ===
- Preceded by: Solar eclipse of July 28, 1851
- Followed by: Solar eclipse of August 19, 1887

=== Inex ===
- Preceded by: Solar eclipse of August 27, 1840
- Followed by: Solar eclipse of July 18, 1898

=== Triad ===
- Preceded by: Solar eclipse of October 7, 1782
- Followed by: Solar eclipse of June 8, 1956

=== Solar eclipses of 1866–1870 ===
This eclipse is a member of a semester series. An eclipse in a semester series of solar eclipses repeats approximately every 177 days and 4 hours (a semester) at alternating nodes of the Moon's orbit.

The partial solar eclipses on April 15, 1866 and October 8, 1866 occur in the previous lunar year eclipse set, and the solar eclipses on June 28, 1870 (partial) and December 22, 1870 (total) occur in the next lunar year eclipse set.

Solar eclipse series sets from 1866 to 1870
Descending node			Ascending node		
Saros	Map	Gamma	Saros	Map	Gamma
108	March 16, 1866 Partial	1.4241	113		
118	March 6, 1867 Annular	0.7716	123	August 29, 1867 Total	−0.7940
128	February 23, 1868 Annular	0.0706	133	August 18, 1868 Total	−0.0443
138	February 11, 1869 Annular	−0.6251	143	August 7, 1869 Total	0.6960
148	January 31, 1870 Partial	−1.2829	153	July 28, 1870 Partial	1.5044

=== Saros 143 ===
This eclipse is a part of Saros series 143, repeating every 18 years, 11 days, and containing 72 events. The series started with a partial solar eclipse on March 7, 1617. It contains total eclipses from June 24, 1797 through October 24, 1995; hybrid eclipses from November 3, 2013 through December 6, 2067; and annular eclipses from December 16, 2085 through September 16, 2536. The series ends at member 72 as a partial eclipse on April 23, 2897. Its eclipses are tabulated in three columns; every third eclipse in the same column is one exeligmos apart, so they all cast shadows over approximately the same parts of the Earth.

The longest duration of totality was produced by member 16 at 3 minutes, 50 seconds on August 19, 1887, and the longest duration of annularity will be produced by member 51 at 4 minutes, 54 seconds on September 6, 2518. All eclipses in this series occur at the Moon’s ascending node of orbit.

Series members 12–33 occur between 1801 and 2200:
12	13	14
July 6, 1815	July 17, 1833	July 28, 1851
15	16	17
August 7, 1869	August 19, 1887	August 30, 1905
18	19	20
September 10, 1923	September 21, 1941	October 2, 1959
21	22	23
October 12, 1977	October 24, 1995	November 3, 2013
24	25	26
November 14, 2031	November 25, 2049	December 6, 2067
27	28	29
December 16, 2085	December 29, 2103	January 8, 2122
30	31	32
January 20, 2140	January 30, 2158	February 10, 2176
33
February 21, 2194

=== Metonic series ===
The metonic series repeats eclipses every 19 years (6939.69 days), lasting about 5 cycles. Eclipses occur in nearly the same calendar date. In addition, the octon subseries repeats 1/5 of that or every 3.8 years (1387.94 days). All eclipses in this table occur at the Moon's ascending node.

25 eclipse events between March 14, 1801 and August 7, 1888
March 14–15	December 31–January 1	October 19–20	August 7	May 26–27
107	109	111	113	115
March 14, 1801	January 1, 1805	October 19, 1808	August 7, 1812	May 27, 1816
117	119	121	123	125
March 14, 1820	January 1, 1824	October 20, 1827	August 7, 1831	May 27, 1835
127	129	131	133	135
March 15, 1839	December 31, 1842	October 20, 1846	August 7, 1850	May 26, 1854
137	139	141	143	145
March 15, 1858	December 31, 1861	October 19, 1865	August 7, 1869	May 26, 1873
147	149	151	153	
March 15, 1877	December 31, 1880	October 19, 1884	August 7, 1888	

=== Tritos series ===
This eclipse is a part of a tritos cycle, repeating at alternating nodes every 135 synodic months (≈ 3986.63 days, or 11 years minus 1 month). Their appearance and longitude are irregular due to a lack of synchronization with the anomalistic month (period of perigee), but groupings of 3 tritos cycles (≈ 33 years minus 3 months) come close (≈ 434.044 anomalistic months), so eclipses are similar in these groupings.

The partial solar eclipse on October 24, 2098 (part of Saros 164) is also a part of this series but is not included in the table below.

Series members between 1801 and 2011
February 11, 1804 (Saros 137)	January 10, 1815 (Saros 138)	December 9, 1825 (Saros 139)	November 9, 1836 (Saros 140)	October 9, 1847 (Saros 141)
September 7, 1858 (Saros 142)	August 7, 1869 (Saros 143)	July 7, 1880 (Saros 144)	June 6, 1891 (Saros 145)	May 7, 1902 (Saros 146)
April 6, 1913 (Saros 147)	March 5, 1924 (Saros 148)	February 3, 1935 (Saros 149)	January 3, 1946 (Saros 150)	December 2, 1956 (Saros 151)
November 2, 1967 (Saros 152)	October 2, 1978 (Saros 153)	August 31, 1989 (Saros 154)	July 31, 2000 (Saros 155)	July 1, 2011 (Saros 156)

=== Inex series ===
This eclipse is a part of the long period inex cycle, repeating at alternating nodes, every 358 synodic months (≈ 10,571.95 days, or 29 years minus 20 days). Their appearance and longitude are irregular due to a lack of synchronization with the anomalistic month (period of perigee). However, groupings of 3 inex cycles (≈ 87 years minus 2 months) comes close (≈ 1,151.02 anomalistic months), so eclipses are similar in these groupings.

Series members between 1801 and 2200
September 17, 1811 (Saros 141)	August 27, 1840 (Saros 142)	August 7, 1869 (Saros 143)
July 18, 1898 (Saros 144)	June 29, 1927 (Saros 145)	June 8, 1956 (Saros 146)
May 19, 1985 (Saros 147)	April 29, 2014 (Saros 148)	April 9, 2043 (Saros 149)
March 19, 2072 (Saros 150)	February 28, 2101 (Saros 151)	February 8, 2130 (Saros 152)
January 19, 2159 (Saros 153)	December 29, 2187 (Saros 154)	
