= Solar eclipse of July 9, 1945 =

Total eclipse

- Total eclipse
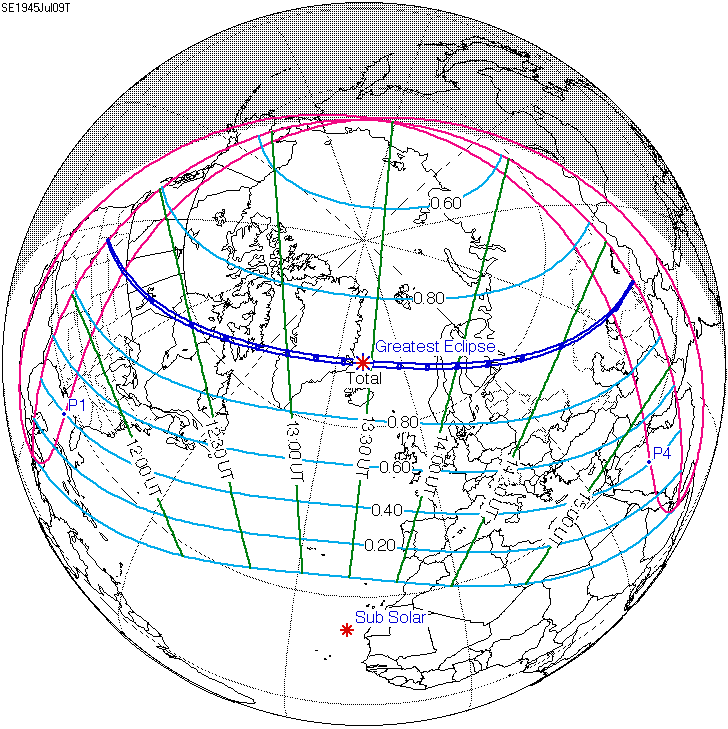
- Map
- Gamma: 0.7356
- Magnitude: 1.018

Maximum eclipse
- Duration: 75 s (1 min 15 s)
- Coordinates: 70°N 17.2°W
- Max. width of band: 92 km (57 mi)

Times (UTC)
- Greatest eclipse: 13:27:46

References
- Saros: 145 (18 of 77)
- Catalog # (SE5000): 9387

A total solar eclipse occurred at the Moon's ascending node of orbit on Monday, July 9, 1945, with a magnitude of 1.018. A solar eclipse occurs when the Moon passes between Earth and the Sun, thereby totally or partly obscuring the image of the Sun for a viewer on Earth. A total solar eclipse occurs when the Moon's apparent diameter is larger than the Sun's, blocking all direct sunlight, turning day into darkness. Totality occurs in a narrow path across Earth's surface, with the partial solar eclipse visible over a surrounding region thousands of kilometres wide. Occurring about 4.4 days after perigee (on July 5, 1945, at 4:40 UTC), the Moon's apparent diameter was larger.

The path of totality crossed Oregon, Idaho, and Montana in the northwestern United States, much of central and northeastern Canada, across Greenland and into Scandinavia, the western Soviet Union, and central Asia. A partial eclipse was visible for parts of North America, Europe, North Africa, West Asia, and the Soviet Union. The eclipse was mostly seen on July 9, 1945, except for northeastern Soviet Union, where a partial eclipse was seen on July 10 local time, or starting on July 9, passing midnight and ending on July 10 due to the midnight sun.

== Observation ==
Princeton University sent a team to observe the total eclipse southeast of Malta, Montana. The Sun happened to appear from a gap in the clouds around the second contact (the beginning of the total phase). The total phase was not affected by the clouds afterwards, but clouds gradually moved closer to the Sun, and blocking the Sun during the partial phase after the total phase ended. Nobody saw Baily's beads, prominences or shadow bands there. The team from the Franklin Institute and University of Pennsylvania in Philadelphia went to Wolseley, Saskatchewan, Canada. The weather condition was clear before sunrise, with only some thin clouds near the horizon. The Sun passed through a series of clouds after sunrise, and the weather kept good since then. The observation was successful. The team from the Yerkes Observatory, Wisconsin observed the eclipse in Pine River in southwestern Manitoba, Canada. The eclipse occurred on the morning of July 9. The eastern sky was covered with clouds at sunrise. The sun came out from the clouds 25 minutes before totality, and half an hour later the entire sky was covered with clouds again. Because the local duration of totality was only 37 seconds, the team took small- and large-scale images of the corona at the same time in order to completely record the data, to study the characteristics of both the outer and inner corona. Since the eclipse occurred only two months after the end of the European theatre of World War II, only a few Swedish teams, one Danish team and one French team managed to observe it from Scandinavia. Another small Norwegian team and some other teams in the Soviet Union did not make observations successfully due to the clouds. Among them, teams from the Stockholm Observatory, Sweden and Paris Observatory, France observed it in Brattås, Västerbotten, Sweden, and photographed the corona and spectra.

== Eclipse details ==
Shown below are two tables displaying details about this particular solar eclipse. The first table outlines times at which the Moon's penumbra or umbra attains the specific parameter, and the second table describes various other parameters pertaining to this eclipse.

July 9, 1945 Solar Eclipse Times
Event	Time (UTC)
First Penumbral External Contact	1945 July 09 at 10:59:59.7 UTC
First Umbral External Contact	1945 July 09 at 12:13:56.0 UTC
First Central Line	1945 July 09 at 12:14:14.5 UTC
First Umbral Internal Contact	1945 July 09 at 12:14:33.1 UTC
Greatest Duration	1945 July 09 at 13:25:30.5 UTC
Equatorial Conjunction	1945 July 09 at 13:25:35.0 UTC
Greatest Eclipse	1945 July 09 at 13:27:45.5 UTC
Ecliptic Conjunction	1945 July 09 at 13:35:40.9 UTC
Last Umbral Internal Contact	1945 July 09 at 14:41:02.5 UTC
Last Central Line	1945 July 09 at 14:41:18.2 UTC
Last Umbral External Contact	1945 July 09 at 14:41:34.0 UTC
Last Penumbral External Contact	1945 July 09 at 15:55:37.9 UTC

July 9, 1945 Solar Eclipse Parameters
Parameter	Value
Eclipse Magnitude	1.01801
Eclipse Obscuration	1.03635
Gamma	0.73557
Sun Right Ascension	07h13m29.9s
Sun Declination	+22°22'15.4"
Sun Semi-Diameter	15'43.9"
Sun Equatorial Horizontal Parallax	08.6"
Moon Right Ascension	07h13m34.9s
Moon Declination	+23°04'54.4"
Moon Semi-Diameter	15'50.6"
Moon Equatorial Horizontal Parallax	0°58'08.9"
ΔT	27.0 s

== Eclipse season ==
This eclipse is part of an eclipse season, a period, roughly every six months, when eclipses occur. Only two (or occasionally three) eclipse seasons occur each year, and each season lasts about 35 days and repeats just short of six months (173 days) later; thus two full eclipse seasons always occur each year. Either two or three eclipses happen each eclipse season. In the sequence below, each eclipse is separated by a fortnight.

Eclipse season of June–July 1945
June 25 Descending node (full moon)	July 9 Ascending node (new moon)
Partial lunar eclipse Lunar Saros 119	Total solar eclipse Solar Saros 145

== Related eclipses ==
=== Eclipses in 1945 ===
- An annular solar eclipse on January 14.
- A partial lunar eclipse on June 25.
- A total solar eclipse on July 9.
- A total lunar eclipse on December 19.

=== Metonic ===
- Preceded by: Solar eclipse of September 21, 1941
- Followed by: Solar eclipse of April 28, 1949

=== Tzolkinex ===
- Preceded by: Solar eclipse of May 29, 1938
- Followed by: Solar eclipse of August 20, 1952

=== Half-Saros ===
- Preceded by: Lunar eclipse of July 4, 1936
- Followed by: Lunar eclipse of July 16, 1954

=== Tritos ===
- Preceded by: Solar eclipse of August 10, 1934
- Followed by: Solar eclipse of June 8, 1956

=== Solar Saros 145 ===
- Preceded by: Solar eclipse of June 29, 1927
- Followed by: Solar eclipse of July 20, 1963

=== Inex ===
- Preceded by: Solar eclipse of July 30, 1916
- Followed by: Solar eclipse of June 20, 1974

=== Triad ===
- Preceded by: Solar eclipse of September 7, 1858
- Followed by: Solar eclipse of May 9, 2032

=== Solar eclipses of 1942–1946 ===
This eclipse is a member of a semester series. An eclipse in a semester series of solar eclipses repeats approximately every 177 days and 4 hours (a semester) at alternating nodes of the Moon's orbit.

The partial solar eclipses on March 16, 1942 and September 10, 1942 occur in the previous lunar year eclipse set, and the partial solar eclipses on May 30, 1946 and November 23, 1946 occur in the next lunar year eclipse set.

Solar eclipse series sets from 1942 to 1946
Ascending node			Descending node		
Saros	Map	Gamma	Saros	Map	Gamma
115	August 12, 1942 Partial	−1.5244	120	February 4, 1943 Total	0.8734
125	August 1, 1943 Annular	−0.8041	130	January 25, 1944 Total	0.2025
135	July 20, 1944 Annular	−0.0314	140	January 14, 1945 Annular	−0.4937
145	July 9, 1945 Total	0.7356	150	January 3, 1946 Partial	−1.2392
155	June 29, 1946 Partial	1.4361			

=== Saros 145 ===
This eclipse is a part of Saros series 145, repeating every 18 years, 11 days, and containing 77 events. The series started with a partial solar eclipse on January 4, 1639. It contains an annular eclipse on June 6, 1891; a hybrid eclipse on June 17, 1909; and total eclipses from June 29, 1927 through September 9, 2648. The series ends at member 77 as a partial eclipse on April 17, 3009. Its eclipses are tabulated in three columns; every third eclipse in the same column is one exeligmos apart, so they all cast shadows over approximately the same parts of the Earth.

The longest duration of annularity was produced by member 15 at 6 seconds (by default) on June 6, 1891, and the longest duration of totality will be produced by member 50 at 7 minutes, 12 seconds on June 25, 2522. All eclipses in this series occur at the Moon’s ascending node of orbit.

Series members 10–32 occur between 1801 and 2200:
10	11	12
April 13, 1801	April 24, 1819	May 4, 1837
13	14	15
May 16, 1855	May 26, 1873	June 6, 1891
16	17	18
June 17, 1909	June 29, 1927	July 9, 1945
19	20	21
July 20, 1963	July 31, 1981	August 11, 1999
22	23	24
August 21, 2017	September 2, 2035	September 12, 2053
25	26	27
September 23, 2071	October 4, 2089	October 16, 2107
28	29	30
October 26, 2125	November 7, 2143	November 17, 2161
31	32	
November 28, 2179	December 9, 2197	

=== Metonic series ===
The metonic series repeats eclipses every 19 years (6939.69 days), lasting about 5 cycles. Eclipses occur in nearly the same calendar date. In addition, the octon subseries repeats 1/5 of that or every 3.8 years (1387.94 days). All eclipses in this table occur at the Moon's ascending node.

22 eclipse events between December 2, 1880 and July 9, 1964
December 2–3	September 20–21	July 9–10	April 26–28	February 13–14
111	113	115	117	119
December 2, 1880		July 9, 1888	April 26, 1892	February 13, 1896
121	123	125	127	129
December 3, 1899	September 21, 1903	July 10, 1907	April 28, 1911	February 14, 1915
131	133	135	137	139
December 3, 1918	September 21, 1922	July 9, 1926	April 28, 1930	February 14, 1934
141	143	145	147	149
December 2, 1937	September 21, 1941	July 9, 1945	April 28, 1949	February 14, 1953
151	153	155		
December 2, 1956	September 20, 1960	July 9, 1964		

=== Tritos series ===
This eclipse is a part of a tritos cycle, repeating at alternating nodes every 135 synodic months (≈ 3986.63 days, or 11 years minus 1 month). Their appearance and longitude are irregular due to a lack of synchronization with the anomalistic month (period of perigee), but groupings of 3 tritos cycles (≈ 33 years minus 3 months) come close (≈ 434.044 anomalistic months), so eclipses are similar in these groupings.

Series members between 1801 and 2087
August 17, 1803 (Saros 132)	July 17, 1814 (Saros 133)	June 16, 1825 (Saros 134)	May 15, 1836 (Saros 135)	April 15, 1847 (Saros 136)
March 15, 1858 (Saros 137)	February 11, 1869 (Saros 138)	January 11, 1880 (Saros 139)	December 12, 1890 (Saros 140)	November 11, 1901 (Saros 141)
October 10, 1912 (Saros 142)	September 10, 1923 (Saros 143)	August 10, 1934 (Saros 144)	July 9, 1945 (Saros 145)	June 8, 1956 (Saros 146)
May 9, 1967 (Saros 147)	April 7, 1978 (Saros 148)	March 7, 1989 (Saros 149)	February 5, 2000 (Saros 150)	January 4, 2011 (Saros 151)
December 4, 2021 (Saros 152)	November 3, 2032 (Saros 153)	October 3, 2043 (Saros 154)	September 2, 2054 (Saros 155)	August 2, 2065 (Saros 156)
July 1, 2076 (Saros 157)	June 1, 2087 (Saros 158)			

=== Inex series ===
This eclipse is a part of the long period inex cycle, repeating at alternating nodes, every 358 synodic months (≈ 10,571.95 days, or 29 years minus 20 days). Their appearance and longitude are irregular due to a lack of synchronization with the anomalistic month (period of perigee). However, groupings of 3 inex cycles (≈ 87 years minus 2 months) comes close (≈ 1,151.02 anomalistic months), so eclipses are similar in these groupings.

Series members between 1801 and 2200
September 28, 1829 (Saros 141)	September 7, 1858 (Saros 142)	August 19, 1887 (Saros 143)
July 30, 1916 (Saros 144)	July 9, 1945 (Saros 145)	June 20, 1974 (Saros 146)
May 31, 2003 (Saros 147)	May 9, 2032 (Saros 148)	April 20, 2061 (Saros 149)
March 31, 2090 (Saros 150)	March 11, 2119 (Saros 151)	February 19, 2148 (Saros 152)
January 29, 2177 (Saros 153)		
