= Solar eclipse of September 21, 1941 =

Total eclipse

- Total eclipse
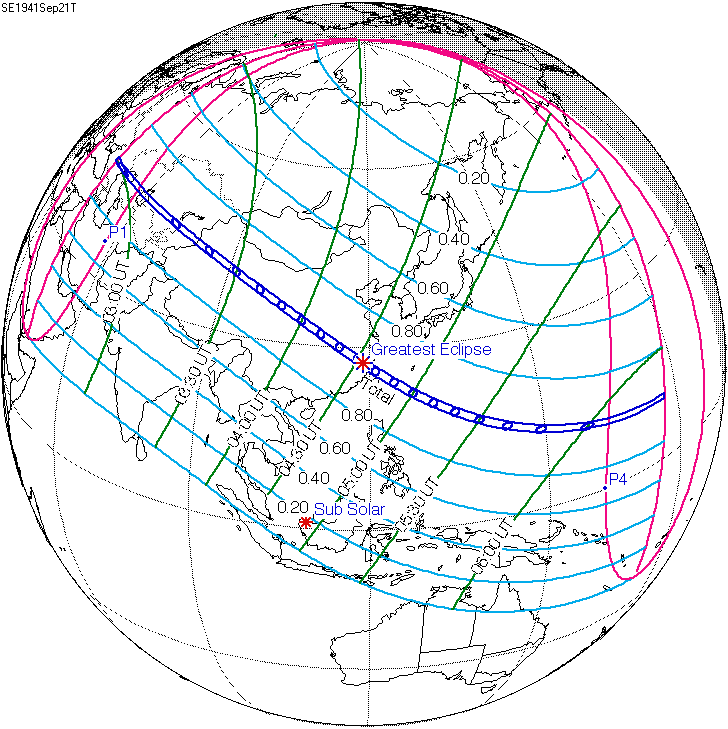
- Map
- Gamma: 0.4649
- Magnitude: 1.0379

Maximum eclipse
- Duration: 202 s (3 min 22 s)
- Coordinates: 27.3°N 119.1°E
- Max. width of band: 143 km (89 mi)

Times (UTC)
- Greatest eclipse: 4:34:03

References
- Saros: 143 (19 of 72)
- Catalog # (SE5000): 9378

A total solar eclipse occurred at the Moon's ascending node of orbit on Sunday, September 21, 1941, with a magnitude of 1.0379. A solar eclipse occurs when the Moon passes between Earth and the Sun, thereby totally or partly obscuring the image of the Sun for a viewer on Earth. A total solar eclipse occurs when the Moon's apparent diameter is larger than the Sun's, blocking all direct sunlight, turning day into darkness. Totality occurs in a narrow path across Earth's surface, with the partial solar eclipse visible over a surrounding region thousands of kilometres wide. Occurring about 2.25 days before perigee (on September 23, 1941, at 10:40 UTC), the Moon's apparent diameter was larger.

The path of totality crossed the Soviet Union (today's Russia, Kazakhstan and Kyrgyzstan), China, Taiwan, Okinawa Prefecture and South Seas Mandate (the parts now belonging to Northern Mariana and Marshall Islands) in Japan, and ended in the Pacific Ocean. A partial eclipse was visible for most of Asia, Northern Australia, and northern Oceania.

== Observations ==
=== China ===
The Chinese Solar Eclipse Observation Committee sent two teams - one led by Zhang Yuzhe and Gao Lu to the Taiyue Temple in Lintao County, Gansu, and the other to Chong'an County (now Wuyishan City), Fujian. The Lintao team started from Kunming, where a number of universities and institutes of higher education were evacuated during the war, on June 30, 1941, and arrived in Lintao on August 13. They traveled by car for a total of 3,200 kilometres and made science popularization speeches along the way.

China was under the rule of the Republic of China and the eclipse occurred during the Second Sino-Japanese War. An artillery regiment was stationed near Lintao, and 20 fighter jets were stationed at Lanzhou Airport ready to intercept Japanese planes. The foggy weather in Lintao suddenly cleared up during the eclipse, making the observation successful. The solar chromosphere spectrum, a movie of the process of the eclipse and three corona images were taken. The brightness of the corona was measured to be 0.37 times that of the full moon. In Chong'an, the cloudy weather resulted in poor results of astronomical observations, but data of the change in Earth's magnetic field during the total phase was still measured.

In November 1934, astronomer Gao Lu organized the Chinese Solar Eclipse Observation Committee to prepare for observations of the solar eclipse of June 19, 1936 and this eclipse in 1941. Due to the Soviet-German War and the Second Sino-Japanese War, European and American astronomers did not make field observations in the Soviet Union and China.

=== Japan ===
Several universities in Japan made observations in Ishigaki Island in Okinawa, Pengjia Islet in Taiwan under Japanese rule, and Chinese sites including Dongyin Island in Fujian, Nanchang in Jiangxi, Heshengqiao in Xianning, Hubei, Yanzhou in Jiayu, Hubei, and Hankou (now in Wuhan). Among them, Ishigaki Island had the sunniest weather and the most successful observation results. Results were poor due to thick clouds in Heshengqiao and Yanzhou where teams of Tokyo Imperial University, Kyoto Imperial University, and Tohoku Imperial University went.

=== Soviet Union ===
The Academy of Sciences of the Soviet Union began preparations in 1939. It was originally planned to involve 28 agencies, but due to the outbreak of World War II, only 7 observation teams were formed. The observation sites were Almaty and Kyzylorda in present-day Kazakhstan. The weather was good in Almaty with many observation results, while there were some clouds in Kyzylorda but several images were still taken. European and American astronomers did not go to the Soviet Union due to the war.

== Eclipse details ==
Shown below are two tables displaying details about this particular solar eclipse. The first table outlines times at which the Moon's penumbra or umbra attains the specific parameter, and the second table describes various other parameters pertaining to this eclipse.

September 21, 1941 Solar Eclipse Times
Event	Time (UTC)
First Penumbral External Contact	1941 September 21 at 01:58:50.4 UTC
First Umbral External Contact	1941 September 21 at 02:59:55.7 UTC
First Central Line	1941 September 21 at 03:00:37.1 UTC
First Umbral Internal Contact	1941 September 21 at 03:01:18.4 UTC
Equatorial Conjunction	1941 September 21 at 04:18:15.8 UTC
Greatest Eclipse	1941 September 21 at 04:34:02.9 UTC
Greatest Duration	1941 September 21 at 04:35:22.1 UTC
Ecliptic Conjunction	1941 September 21 at 04:38:53.8 UTC
Last Umbral Internal Contact	1941 September 21 at 06:06:56.6 UTC
Last Central Line	1941 September 21 at 06:07:40.0 UTC
Last Umbral External Contact	1941 September 21 at 06:08:23.3 UTC
Last Penumbral External Contact	1941 September 21 at 07:09:18.6 UTC

September 21, 1941 Solar Eclipse Parameters
Parameter	Value
Eclipse Magnitude	1.03791
Eclipse Obscuration	1.07725
Gamma	0.46494
Sun Right Ascension	11h51m55.1s
Sun Declination	+00°52'33.2"
Sun Semi-Diameter	15'55.9"
Sun Equatorial Horizontal Parallax	08.8"
Moon Right Ascension	11h52m29.0s
Moon Declination	+01°18'57.7"
Moon Semi-Diameter	16'17.7"
Moon Equatorial Horizontal Parallax	0°59'48.1"
ΔT	25.2 s

== Eclipse season ==
This eclipse is part of an eclipse season, a period, roughly every six months, when eclipses occur. Only two (or occasionally three) eclipse seasons occur each year, and each season lasts about 35 days and repeats just short of six months (173 days) later; thus two full eclipse seasons always occur each year. Either two or three eclipses happen each eclipse season. In the sequence below, each eclipse is separated by a fortnight.

Eclipse season of September 1941
September 5 Descending node (full moon)	September 21 Ascending node (new moon)
Partial lunar eclipse Lunar Saros 117	Total solar eclipse Solar Saros 143

== Related eclipses ==
=== Eclipses in 1941 ===
- A partial lunar eclipse on March 13.
- An annular solar eclipse on March 27.
- A partial lunar eclipse on September 5.
- A total solar eclipse on September 21.

=== Metonic ===
- Preceded by: Solar eclipse of December 2, 1937
- Followed by: Solar eclipse of July 9, 1945

=== Tzolkinex ===
- Preceded by: Solar eclipse of August 10, 1934
- Followed by: Solar eclipse of November 1, 1948

=== Half-Saros ===
- Preceded by: Lunar eclipse of September 14, 1932
- Followed by: Lunar eclipse of September 26, 1950

=== Tritos ===
- Preceded by: Solar eclipse of October 21, 1930
- Followed by: Solar eclipse of August 20, 1952

=== Solar Saros 143 ===
- Preceded by: Solar eclipse of September 10, 1923
- Followed by: Solar eclipse of October 2, 1959

=== Inex ===
- Preceded by: Solar eclipse of October 10, 1912
- Followed by: Solar eclipse of August 31, 1970

=== Triad ===
- Preceded by: Solar eclipse of November 20, 1854
- Followed by: Solar eclipse of July 22, 2028

=== Solar eclipses of 1939–1942 ===
This eclipse is a member of a semester series. An eclipse in a semester series of solar eclipses repeats approximately every 177 days and 4 hours (a semester) at alternating nodes of the Moon's orbit.

The partial solar eclipse on August 12, 1942 occurs in the next lunar year eclipse set.

Solar eclipse series sets from 1939 to 1942
Descending node			Ascending node		
Saros	Map	Gamma	Saros	Map	Gamma
118	April 19, 1939 Annular	0.9388	123	October 12, 1939 Total	−0.9737
128	April 7, 1940 Annular	0.219	133	October 1, 1940 Total	−0.2573
138	March 27, 1941 Annular	−0.5025	143	September 21, 1941 Total	0.4649
148	March 16, 1942 Partial	−1.1908	153	September 10, 1942 Partial	1.2571

=== Saros 143 ===
This eclipse is a part of Saros series 143, repeating every 18 years, 11 days, and containing 72 events. The series started with a partial solar eclipse on March 7, 1617. It contains total eclipses from June 24, 1797 through October 24, 1995; hybrid eclipses from November 3, 2013 through December 6, 2067; and annular eclipses from December 16, 2085 through September 16, 2536. The series ends at member 72 as a partial eclipse on April 23, 2897. Its eclipses are tabulated in three columns; every third eclipse in the same column is one exeligmos apart, so they all cast shadows over approximately the same parts of the Earth.

The longest duration of totality was produced by member 16 at 3 minutes, 50 seconds on August 19, 1887, and the longest duration of annularity will be produced by member 51 at 4 minutes, 54 seconds on September 6, 2518. All eclipses in this series occur at the Moon’s ascending node of orbit.

Series members 12–33 occur between 1801 and 2200:
12	13	14
July 6, 1815	July 17, 1833	July 28, 1851
15	16	17
August 7, 1869	August 19, 1887	August 30, 1905
18	19	20
September 10, 1923	September 21, 1941	October 2, 1959
21	22	23
October 12, 1977	October 24, 1995	November 3, 2013
24	25	26
November 14, 2031	November 25, 2049	December 6, 2067
27	28	29
December 16, 2085	December 29, 2103	January 8, 2122
30	31	32
January 20, 2140	January 30, 2158	February 10, 2176
33
February 21, 2194

=== Metonic series ===
The metonic series repeats eclipses every 19 years (6939.69 days), lasting about 5 cycles. Eclipses occur in nearly the same calendar date. In addition, the octon subseries repeats 1/5 of that or every 3.8 years (1387.94 days). All eclipses in this table occur at the Moon's ascending node.

22 eclipse events between December 2, 1880 and July 9, 1964
December 2–3	September 20–21	July 9–10	April 26–28	February 13–14
111	113	115	117	119
December 2, 1880		July 9, 1888	April 26, 1892	February 13, 1896
121	123	125	127	129
December 3, 1899	September 21, 1903	July 10, 1907	April 28, 1911	February 14, 1915
131	133	135	137	139
December 3, 1918	September 21, 1922	July 9, 1926	April 28, 1930	February 14, 1934
141	143	145	147	149
December 2, 1937	September 21, 1941	July 9, 1945	April 28, 1949	February 14, 1953
151	153	155		
December 2, 1956	September 20, 1960	July 9, 1964		

=== Tritos series ===
This eclipse is a part of a tritos cycle, repeating at alternating nodes every 135 synodic months (≈ 3986.63 days, or 11 years minus 1 month). Their appearance and longitude are irregular due to a lack of synchronization with the anomalistic month (period of perigee), but groupings of 3 tritos cycles (≈ 33 years minus 3 months) come close (≈ 434.044 anomalistic months), so eclipses are similar in these groupings.

The partial solar eclipses on December 7, 2170 (part of Saros 164) and November 7, 2181 (part of Saros 165) are also a part of this series but are not included in the table below.

Series members between 1801 and 2105
September 28, 1810 (Saros 131)	August 27, 1821 (Saros 132)	July 27, 1832 (Saros 133)	June 27, 1843 (Saros 134)	May 26, 1854 (Saros 135)
April 25, 1865 (Saros 136)	March 25, 1876 (Saros 137)	February 22, 1887 (Saros 138)	January 22, 1898 (Saros 139)	December 23, 1908 (Saros 140)
November 22, 1919 (Saros 141)	October 21, 1930 (Saros 142)	September 21, 1941 (Saros 143)	August 20, 1952 (Saros 144)	July 20, 1963 (Saros 145)
June 20, 1974 (Saros 146)	May 19, 1985 (Saros 147)	April 17, 1996 (Saros 148)	March 19, 2007 (Saros 149)	February 15, 2018 (Saros 150)
January 14, 2029 (Saros 151)	December 15, 2039 (Saros 152)	November 14, 2050 (Saros 153)	October 13, 2061 (Saros 154)	September 12, 2072 (Saros 155)
August 13, 2083 (Saros 156)	July 12, 2094 (Saros 157)	June 12, 2105 (Saros 158)		

=== Inex series ===
This eclipse is a part of the long period inex cycle, repeating at alternating nodes, every 358 synodic months (≈ 10,571.95 days, or 29 years minus 20 days). Their appearance and longitude are irregular due to a lack of synchronization with the anomalistic month (period of perigee). However, groupings of 3 inex cycles (≈ 87 years minus 2 months) comes close (≈ 1,151.02 anomalistic months), so eclipses are similar in these groupings.

Series members between 1801 and 2200
December 9, 1825 (Saros 139)	November 20, 1854 (Saros 140)	October 30, 1883 (Saros 141)
October 10, 1912 (Saros 142)	September 21, 1941 (Saros 143)	August 31, 1970 (Saros 144)
August 11, 1999 (Saros 145)	July 22, 2028 (Saros 146)	July 1, 2057 (Saros 147)
June 11, 2086 (Saros 148)	May 24, 2115 (Saros 149)	May 3, 2144 (Saros 150)
April 12, 2173 (Saros 151)		
