= Solar eclipse of July 20, 1963 =

Total eclipse

- Total eclipse
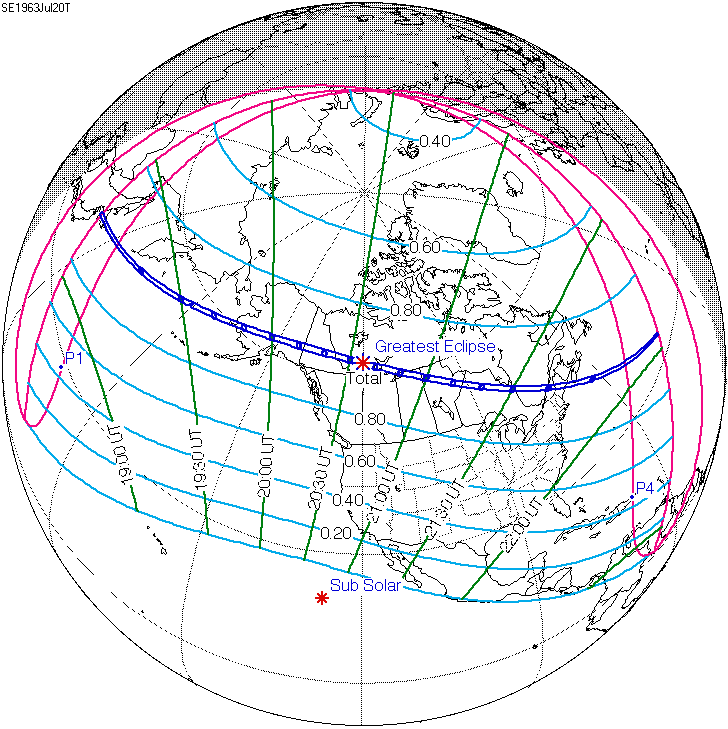
- Map
- Gamma: 0.6571
- Magnitude: 1.0224

Maximum eclipse
- Duration: 100 s (1 min 40 s)
- Coordinates: 61.7°N 119.6°W
- Max. width of band: 101 km (63 mi)

Times (UTC)
- Greatest eclipse: 20:36:13

References
- Saros: 145 (19 of 77)
- Catalog # (SE5000): 9427

A total solar eclipse occurred at the Moon's ascending node of orbit between Saturday, July 20 and Sunday, July 21, 1963, with a magnitude of 1.0224. A solar eclipse occurs when the Moon passes between Earth and the Sun, thereby totally or partly obscuring the image of the Sun for a viewer on Earth. A total solar eclipse occurs when the Moon's apparent diameter is at least the same size as the Sun's or larger, blocking all direct sunlight, turning day into darkness. Totality occurs in a narrow path across Earth's surface, with a partial solar eclipse visible over the surrounding region thousands of kilometres wide. Occurring about 4.1 days after perigee (on July 16, 1963, at 19:20 UTC), the Moon's apparent diameter was larger.

Astronomer Charles H. Smiley observed the eclipse from a U.S. Air Force F-104D Starfighter supersonic aircraft that was "racing the Moon's shadow" at 1,300 mph (2,100 km/h) extending the duration of totality to 4 minutes 3 seconds.

The Moon's apparent diameter was 4.8 arcseconds smaller than the January 25, 1963 annular solar eclipse. This was a total solar eclipse because it occurred in July when the Earth is near aphelion (furthest from the Sun). The Moon's apparent diameter was just over 2.2% larger than the Sun's.

Totality was visible from Hokkaido in Japan and Kuril Islands in Soviet Union (now belonging to Russia) on July 21, and Alaska, and Maine in the United States and also Canada on July 20. A partial eclipse was visible for parts of the eastern Soviet Union, North America, Central America, the Caribbean, far northern Europe, and northern South America.

== Observations ==
Mamoru Mohri, Japanese scientist and former NASDA astronaut, who was 15 years old and living in Hokkaido at the time, said that seeing this total solar eclipse made him want to become a scientist.

Scientists from the Dominion Observatory, University of Oxford, National Research Council Canada and University of Saskatchewan flew a Royal Canadian Air Force aircraft to observe the total eclipse at 30,000 feet (9,100 m) above the Great Slave Lake area. Due to the lack of navigation system in the area, the plane had to fly directly from Ottawa to Fort Simpson and then back to Ottawa, taking about 13 hours in total. On July 20, thin clouds in the Great Slave Lake area expanded to an altitude of 40,000 feet (12,000 m), so no results were got from optical observations, but the instruments installed on the aircraft still recorded data. In addition, wind speeds of nearly 100 knots (190 km/h; 120 mph) also caused the aircraft to enter the Moon's umbra one minute ahead of schedule, west of the planned location. In addition, scientists from the Royal Astronomical Society of Canada also made radio observations in Grand-Mère, Quebec.

== In popular culture ==
The eclipse was featured in the comic strip Peanuts (July 15–20, 1963), with Linus demonstrating a safe way of observing the eclipse as opposed to looking directly at the eclipse. On the day the eclipse passed over his area, Linus was left helplessly standing in the rain with cloud cover entirely too thick to witness the eclipse.

This particular eclipse event plays an important part in two of Stephen King's novels, Gerald's Game (1992) and Dolores Claiborne (1992).

The eclipse is mentioned in passing in John Updike' s novel Couples (1968) in relation to Piet and Foxy.

The eclipse was featured in the season 3 episode of Mad Men entitled "Seven Twenty Three" (2009, S03E07).

== Eclipse details ==
Shown below are two tables displaying details about this particular solar eclipse. The first table outlines times at which the Moon's penumbra or umbra attains the specific parameter, and the second table describes various other parameters pertaining to this eclipse.

July 20, 1963 Solar Eclipse Times
Event	Time (UTC)
First Penumbral External Contact	1963 July 20 at 18:04:48.2 UTC
First Umbral External Contact	1963 July 20 at 19:14:15.8 UTC
First Central Line	1963 July 20 at 19:14:39.4 UTC
First Umbral Internal Contact	1963 July 20 at 19:15:02.9 UTC
Equatorial Conjunction	1963 July 20 at 20:29:11.6 UTC
Greatest Duration	1963 July 20 at 20:33:37.0 UTC
Greatest Eclipse	1963 July 20 at 20:36:13.1 UTC
Ecliptic Conjunction	1963 July 20 at 20:43:16.7 UTC
Last Umbral Internal Contact	1963 July 20 at 21:57:31.4 UTC
Last Central Line	1963 July 20 at 21:57:52.2 UTC
Last Umbral External Contact	1963 July 20 at 21:58:13.0 UTC
Last Penumbral External Contact	1963 July 20 at 23:07:47.0 UTC

July 20, 1963 Solar Eclipse Parameters
Parameter	Value
Eclipse Magnitude	1.02236
Eclipse Obscuration	1.04522
Gamma	0.65710
Sun Right Ascension	07h57m51.3s
Sun Declination	+20°41'02.2"
Sun Semi-Diameter	15'44.3"
Sun Equatorial Horizontal Parallax	08.7"
Moon Right Ascension	07h58m07.4s
Moon Declination	+21°19'05.7"
Moon Semi-Diameter	15'53.9"
Moon Equatorial Horizontal Parallax	0°58'20.8"
ΔT	34.8 s

== Eclipse season ==
This eclipse is part of an eclipse season, a period, roughly every six months, when eclipses occur. Only two (or occasionally three) eclipse seasons occur each year, and each season lasts about 35 days and repeats just short of six months (173 days) later; thus two full eclipse seasons always occur each year. Either two or three eclipses happen each eclipse season. In the sequence below, each eclipse is separated by a fortnight.

Eclipse season of July 1963
July 6 Descending node (full moon)	July 20 Ascending node (new moon)
Partial lunar eclipse Lunar Saros 119	Total solar eclipse Solar Saros 145

== Related eclipses ==
=== Eclipses in 1963 ===
- A penumbral lunar eclipse on January 9.
- An annular solar eclipse on January 25.
- A partial lunar eclipse on July 6.
- A total solar eclipse on July 20.
- A total lunar eclipse on December 30.

=== Metonic ===
- Preceded by: Solar eclipse of October 2, 1959
- Followed by: Solar eclipse of May 9, 1967

=== Tzolkinex ===
- Preceded by: Solar eclipse of June 8, 1956
- Followed by: Solar eclipse of August 31, 1970

=== Half-Saros ===
- Preceded by: Lunar eclipse of July 16, 1954
- Followed by: Lunar eclipse of July 26, 1972

=== Tritos ===
- Preceded by: Solar eclipse of August 20, 1952
- Followed by: Solar eclipse of June 20, 1974

=== Solar Saros 145 ===
- Preceded by: Solar eclipse of July 9, 1945
- Followed by: Solar eclipse of July 31, 1981

=== Inex ===
- Preceded by: Solar eclipse of August 10, 1934
- Followed by: Solar eclipse of June 30, 1992

=== Triad ===
- Preceded by: Solar eclipse of September 17, 1876
- Followed by: Solar eclipse of May 20, 2050

=== Solar eclipses of 1961–1964 ===
This eclipse is a member of a semester series. An eclipse in a semester series of solar eclipses repeats approximately every 177 days and 4 hours (a semester) at alternating nodes of the Moon's orbit.

The partial solar eclipses on June 10, 1964 and December 4, 1964 occur in the next lunar year eclipse set.

Solar eclipse series sets from 1961 to 1964
Descending node			Ascending node		
Saros	Map	Gamma	Saros	Map	Gamma
120	February 15, 1961 Total	0.883	125	August 11, 1961 Annular	−0.8859
130	February 5, 1962 Total	0.2107	135	July 31, 1962 Annular	−0.113
140	January 25, 1963 Annular	−0.4898	145	July 20, 1963 Total	0.6571
150	January 14, 1964 Partial	−1.2354	155	July 9, 1964 Partial	1.3623

=== Saros 145 ===
This eclipse is a part of Saros series 145, repeating every 18 years, 11 days, and containing 77 events. The series started with a partial solar eclipse on January 4, 1639. It contains an annular eclipse on June 6, 1891; a hybrid eclipse on June 17, 1909; and total eclipses from June 29, 1927 through September 9, 2648. The series ends at member 77 as a partial eclipse on April 17, 3009. Its eclipses are tabulated in three columns; every third eclipse in the same column is one exeligmos apart, so they all cast shadows over approximately the same parts of the Earth.

The longest duration of annularity was produced by member 15 at 6 seconds (by default) on June 6, 1891, and the longest duration of totality will be produced by member 50 at 7 minutes, 12 seconds on June 25, 2522. All eclipses in this series occur at the Moon’s ascending node of orbit.

Series members 10–32 occur between 1801 and 2200:
10	11	12
April 13, 1801	April 24, 1819	May 4, 1837
13	14	15
May 16, 1855	May 26, 1873	June 6, 1891
16	17	18
June 17, 1909	June 29, 1927	July 9, 1945
19	20	21
July 20, 1963	July 31, 1981	August 11, 1999
22	23	24
August 21, 2017	September 2, 2035	September 12, 2053
25	26	27
September 23, 2071	October 4, 2089	October 16, 2107
28	29	30
October 26, 2125	November 7, 2143	November 17, 2161
31	32	
November 28, 2179	December 9, 2197	

=== Metonic series ===
The metonic series repeats eclipses every 19 years (6939.69 days), lasting about 5 cycles. Eclipses occur in nearly the same calendar date. In addition, the octon subseries repeats 1/5 of that or every 3.8 years (1387.94 days). All eclipses in this table occur at the Moon's ascending node.

22 eclipse events between December 13, 1898 and July 20, 1982
December 13–14	October 1–2	July 20–21	May 9	February 24–25
111	113	115	117	119
December 13, 1898		July 21, 1906	May 9, 1910	February 25, 1914
121	123	125	127	129
December 14, 1917	October 1, 1921	July 20, 1925	May 9, 1929	February 24, 1933
131	133	135	137	139
December 13, 1936	October 1, 1940	July 20, 1944	May 9, 1948	February 25, 1952
141	143	145	147	149
December 14, 1955	October 2, 1959	July 20, 1963	May 9, 1967	February 25, 1971
151	153	155		
December 13, 1974	October 2, 1978	July 20, 1982		

=== Tritos series ===
This eclipse is a part of a tritos cycle, repeating at alternating nodes every 135 synodic months (≈ 3986.63 days, or 11 years minus 1 month). Their appearance and longitude are irregular due to a lack of synchronization with the anomalistic month (period of perigee), but groupings of 3 tritos cycles (≈ 33 years minus 3 months) come close (≈ 434.044 anomalistic months), so eclipses are similar in these groupings.

The partial solar eclipses on December 7, 2170 (part of Saros 164) and November 7, 2181 (part of Saros 165) are also a part of this series but are not included in the table below.

Series members between 1801 and 2105
September 28, 1810 (Saros 131)	August 27, 1821 (Saros 132)	July 27, 1832 (Saros 133)	June 27, 1843 (Saros 134)	May 26, 1854 (Saros 135)
April 25, 1865 (Saros 136)	March 25, 1876 (Saros 137)	February 22, 1887 (Saros 138)	January 22, 1898 (Saros 139)	December 23, 1908 (Saros 140)
November 22, 1919 (Saros 141)	October 21, 1930 (Saros 142)	September 21, 1941 (Saros 143)	August 20, 1952 (Saros 144)	July 20, 1963 (Saros 145)
June 20, 1974 (Saros 146)	May 19, 1985 (Saros 147)	April 17, 1996 (Saros 148)	March 19, 2007 (Saros 149)	February 15, 2018 (Saros 150)
January 14, 2029 (Saros 151)	December 15, 2039 (Saros 152)	November 14, 2050 (Saros 153)	October 13, 2061 (Saros 154)	September 12, 2072 (Saros 155)
August 13, 2083 (Saros 156)	July 12, 2094 (Saros 157)	June 12, 2105 (Saros 158)		

=== Inex series ===
This eclipse is a part of the long period inex cycle, repeating at alternating nodes, every 358 synodic months (≈ 10,571.95 days, or 29 years minus 20 days). Their appearance and longitude are irregular due to a lack of synchronization with the anomalistic month (period of perigee). However, groupings of 3 inex cycles (≈ 87 years minus 2 months) comes close (≈ 1,151.02 anomalistic months), so eclipses are similar in these groupings.

Series members between 1801 and 2200
October 29, 1818 (Saros 140)	October 9, 1847 (Saros 141)	September 17, 1876 (Saros 142)
August 30, 1905 (Saros 143)	August 10, 1934 (Saros 144)	July 20, 1963 (Saros 145)
June 30, 1992 (Saros 146)	June 10, 2021 (Saros 147)	May 20, 2050 (Saros 148)
May 1, 2079 (Saros 149)	April 11, 2108 (Saros 150)	March 21, 2137 (Saros 151)
March 2, 2166 (Saros 152)	February 10, 2195 (Saros 153)	
