= Solar eclipse of November 14, 2031 =

Total eclipse

- Hybrid eclipse
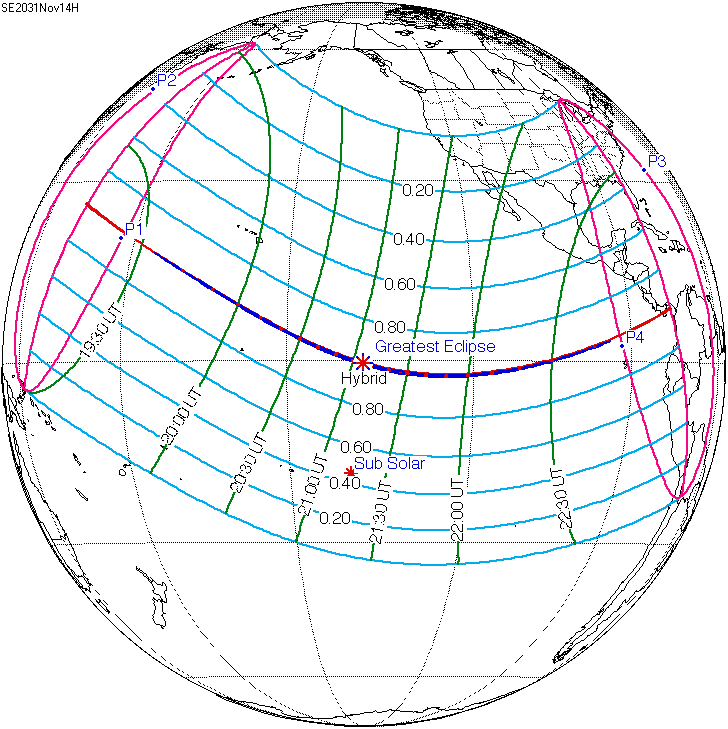
- Map
- Gamma: 0.3078
- Magnitude: 1.0106

Maximum eclipse
- Duration: 68 s (1 min 8 s)
- Coordinates: 0.6°S 137.6°W
- Max. width of band: 38 km (24 mi)

Times (UTC)
- Greatest eclipse: 21:07:31

References
- Saros: 143 (24 of 72)
- Catalog # (SE5000): 9578

A total solar eclipse will occur at the Moon's ascending node of orbit on Friday, November 14, 2031, with a magnitude of 1.0106. It is a hybrid event, with portions of its central path near sunrise and sunset as an annular eclipse. A solar eclipse occurs when the Moon passes between Earth and the Sun, thereby totally or partly obscuring the image of the Sun for a viewer on Earth. A hybrid solar eclipse is a rare type of solar eclipse that changes its appearance from annular to total and back as the Moon's shadow moves across the Earth's surface. Totality occurs between the annularity paths across the surface of the Earth, with the partial solar eclipse visible over a surrounding region thousands of kilometres wide. Occurring about 3.1 days before perigee (on November 17, 2031, at 22:00 UTC), the Moon's apparent diameter will be larger.

Since most of the path of this eclipse is narrow and passes over the Pacific Ocean, no land areas will witness totality. However, annularity will be visible from parts of Panama near sunset. A partial eclipse will be visible for parts of northern Oceania, Hawaii, southern North America, Central America, the Caribbean, and northwestern South America.

== Images ==
Animated path

== Eclipse timing ==
=== Places experiencing partial eclipse ===
Solar Eclipse of November 14, 2031 (Local Times)
Country or territory	City or place	Start of partial eclipse	Maximum eclipse	End of partial eclipse	Duration of eclipse (hr:min)	Maximum coverage
United States Minor Outlying Islands	Wake Island (Note: The times listed for this location occur on November 15, 2031, local time.)	07:00:41 (sunrise)	07:23:17	08:28:39	1:28	78.44%
Federated States of Micronesia	Palikir	06:17:26 (sunrise)	06:24:16	07:12:35	0:55	26.08%
Marshall Islands	Majuro	06:32:07	07:27:00	08:28:37	1:57	42.07%
United States Minor Outlying Islands	Midway Atoll	07:27:58	08:32:10	09:44:53	2:17	66.05%
United States	Honolulu	08:39:10	09:55:27	11:23:23	2:44	57.79%
Kiribati	Kiritimati	08:44:40	10:08:22	11:46:07	3:01	77.84%
French Polynesia	Papeete	09:36:04	10:49:11	12:07:03	2:31	26.08%
French Polynesia	Taioha'e	10:00:02	11:38:11	13:17:57	3:18	67.46%
United States	Washington, D.C.	16:43:21	16:52:09	16:55:09 (sunset)	0:12	2.39%
Haiti	Port-au-Prince	16:43:35	17:05:11	17:11:57 (sunset)	0:28	20.63%
Venezuela	Maracaibo	17:46:28	18:17:52	18:20:11 (sunset)	0:34	38.53%
Bahamas	Nassau	16:41:03	17:18:29	17:21:59 (sunset)	0:41	32.23%
Clipperton Island	Clipperton Island	12:53:36	14:21:59	15:36:18	2:43	59.97%
Venezuela	San Cristóbal	17:47:29	18:24:11	18:26:29 (sunset)	0:39	47.56%
Jamaica	Kingston	16:42:02	17:26:49	17:30:33 (sunset)	0:49	52.05%
Mexico	Mexico City	15:20:07	16:30:46	17:32:05	2:12	39.25%
Colombia	Bogotá	16:48:04	17:35:08	17:38:09 (sunset)	0:50	63.13%
Cuba	Havana	16:38:46	17:39:22	17:45:09 (sunset)	1:06	44.16%
Belize	Belmopan	15:33:16	16:41:09	17:19:34 (sunset)	1:46	56.12%
Guatemala	Guatemala City	15:31:06	16:41:47	17:30:22 (sunset)	1:59	63.10%
Cayman Islands	George Town	16:39:23	17:42:40	17:47:00 (sunset)	1:08	57.44%
El Salvador	San Salvador	15:32:40	16:43:06	17:26:17 (sunset)	1:54	67.76%
Honduras	Tegucigalpa	15:34:50	16:43:54	17:17:45 (sunset)	1:43	68.63%
Nicaragua	Managua	15:35:57	16:45:19	17:16:41 (sunset)	1:41	76.65%
Ecuador	Galápagos Islands	15:35:17	16:46:51	17:47:33 (sunset)	2:12	78.25%
Costa Rica	San José	15:38:28	16:47:02	17:11:01 (sunset)	1:33	87.35%
Peru	Lima	16:59:05	17:48:05	18:12:27 (sunset)	1:13	25.48%
Panama	Panama City	16:42:36	17:48:22	17:54:02 (sunset)	1:11	96.39%
Peru	Piura	16:48:52	17:49:27	18:17:25 (sunset)	1:29	51.65%
Ecuador	Quito	16:47:32	17:50:01	18:02:17 (sunset)	1:15	67.02%

== Eclipse details ==
Shown below are two tables displaying details about this particular solar eclipse. The first table outlines times at which the Moon's penumbra or umbra attains the specific parameter, and the second table describes various other parameters pertaining to this eclipse.

November 14, 2031 Solar Eclipse Times
Event	Time (UTC)
First Penumbral External Contact	2031 November 14 at 18:24:26.5 UTC
First Umbral External Contact	2031 November 14 at 19:25:05.7 UTC
First Central Line	2031 November 14 at 19:25:17.7 UTC
First Umbral Internal Contact	2031 November 14 at 19:25:29.6 UTC
First Penumbral Internal Contact	2031 November 14 at 20:32:10.8 UTC
Equatorial Conjunction	2031 November 14 at 21:02:09.9 UTC
Greatest Eclipse	2031 November 14 at 21:07:30.7 UTC
Ecliptic Conjunction	2031 November 14 at 21:10:47.9 UTC
Greatest Duration	2031 November 14 at 21:11:43.9 UTC
Last Penumbral Internal Contact	2031 November 14 at 21:43:00.1 UTC
Last Umbral Internal Contact	2031 November 14 at 22:49:37.4 UTC
Last Central Line	2031 November 14 at 22:49:46.9 UTC
Last Umbral External Contact	2031 November 14 at 22:49:56.3 UTC
Last Penumbral External Contact	2031 November 14 at 23:50:31.9 UTC

November 14, 2031 Solar Eclipse Parameters
Parameter	Value
Eclipse Magnitude	1.01059
Eclipse Obscuration	1.02128
Gamma	0.30776
Sun Right Ascension	15h19m31.2s
Sun Declination	-18°20'14.5"
Sun Semi-Diameter	16'09.9"
Sun Equatorial Horizontal Parallax	08.9"
Moon Right Ascension	15h19m43.3s
Moon Declination	-18°02'21.3"
Moon Semi-Diameter	16'05.0"
Moon Equatorial Horizontal Parallax	0°59'01.4"
ΔT	74.7 s

== Eclipse season ==
This eclipse is part of an eclipse season, a period, roughly every six months, when eclipses occur. Only two (or occasionally three) eclipse seasons occur each year, and each season lasts about 35 days and repeats just short of six months (173 days) later; thus two full eclipse seasons always occur each year. Either two or three eclipses happen each eclipse season. In the sequence below, each eclipse is separated by a fortnight.

Eclipse season of October–November 2031
October 30 Descending node (full moon)	November 14 Ascending node (new moon)
Penumbral lunar eclipse Lunar Saros 117	Hybrid solar eclipse Solar Saros 143

== Related eclipses ==
=== Eclipses in 2031 ===
- A penumbral lunar eclipse on May 7.
- An annular solar eclipse on May 21.
- A penumbral lunar eclipse on June 5.
- A penumbral lunar eclipse on October 30.
- A hybrid solar eclipse on November 14.

=== Metonic ===
- Preceded by: Solar eclipse of January 26, 2028
- Followed by: Solar eclipse of September 2, 2035

=== Tzolkinex ===
- Preceded by: Solar eclipse of October 2, 2024
- Followed by: Solar eclipse of December 26, 2038

=== Half-Saros ===
- Preceded by: Lunar eclipse of November 8, 2022
- Followed by: Lunar eclipse of November 18, 2040

=== Tritos ===
- Preceded by: Solar eclipse of December 14, 2020
- Followed by: Solar eclipse of October 14, 2042

=== Solar Saros 143 ===
- Preceded by: Solar eclipse of November 3, 2013
- Followed by: Solar eclipse of November 25, 2049

=== Inex ===
- Preceded by: Solar eclipse of December 4, 2002
- Followed by: Solar eclipse of October 24, 2060

=== Triad ===
- Preceded by: Solar eclipse of January 14, 1945
- Followed by: Solar eclipse of September 15, 2118

=== Solar eclipses of 2029–2032 ===
This eclipse is a member of a semester series. An eclipse in a semester series of solar eclipses repeats approximately every 177 days and 4 hours (a semester) at alternating nodes of the Moon's orbit.

The partial solar eclipses on January 14, 2029 and July 11, 2029 occur in the previous lunar year eclipse set.

Solar eclipse series sets from 2029 to 2032
Descending node			Ascending node		
Saros	Map	Gamma	Saros	Map	Gamma
118	June 12, 2029 Partial	1.29431	123	December 5, 2029 Partial	−1.06090
128	June 1, 2030 Annular	0.56265	133	November 25, 2030 Total	−0.38669
138	May 21, 2031 Annular	−0.19699	143	November 14, 2031 Hybrid	0.30776
148	May 9, 2032 Annular	−0.93748	153	November 3, 2032 Partial	1.06431

=== Saros 143 ===
This eclipse is a part of Saros series 143, repeating every 18 years, 11 days, and containing 72 events. The series started with a partial solar eclipse on March 7, 1617. It contains total eclipses from June 24, 1797 through October 24, 1995; hybrid eclipses from November 3, 2013 through December 6, 2067; and annular eclipses from December 16, 2085 through September 16, 2536. The series ends at member 72 as a partial eclipse on April 23, 2897. Its eclipses are tabulated in three columns; every third eclipse in the same column is one exeligmos apart, so they all cast shadows over approximately the same parts of the Earth.

The longest duration of totality was produced by member 16 at 3 minutes, 50 seconds on August 19, 1887, and the longest duration of annularity will be produced by member 51 at 4 minutes, 54 seconds on September 6, 2518. All eclipses in this series occur at the Moon’s ascending node of orbit.

Series members 12–33 occur between 1801 and 2200:
12	13	14
July 6, 1815	July 17, 1833	July 28, 1851
15	16	17
August 7, 1869	August 19, 1887	August 30, 1905
18	19	20
September 10, 1923	September 21, 1941	October 2, 1959
21	22	23
October 12, 1977	October 24, 1995	November 3, 2013
24	25	26
November 14, 2031	November 25, 2049	December 6, 2067
27	28	29
December 16, 2085	December 29, 2103	January 8, 2122
30	31	32
January 20, 2140	January 30, 2158	February 10, 2176
33
February 21, 2194

=== Metonic series ===
The metonic series repeats eclipses every 19 years (6939.69 days), lasting about 5 cycles. Eclipses occur in nearly the same calendar date. In addition, the octon subseries repeats 1/5 of that or every 3.8 years (1387.94 days). All eclipses in this table occur at the Moon's ascending node.

21 eclipse events between June 21, 1982 and June 21, 2058
June 21	April 8–9	January 26	November 13–14	September 1–2
117	119	121	123	125
June 21, 1982	April 9, 1986	January 26, 1990	November 13, 1993	September 2, 1997
127	129	131	133	135
June 21, 2001	April 8, 2005	January 26, 2009	November 13, 2012	September 1, 2016
137	139	141	143	145
June 21, 2020	April 8, 2024	January 26, 2028	November 14, 2031	September 2, 2035
147	149	151	153	155
June 21, 2039	April 9, 2043	January 26, 2047	November 14, 2050	September 2, 2054
157
June 21, 2058

=== Tritos series ===
This eclipse is a part of a tritos cycle, repeating at alternating nodes every 135 synodic months (≈ 3986.63 days, or 11 years minus 1 month). Their appearance and longitude are irregular due to a lack of synchronization with the anomalistic month (period of perigee), but groupings of 3 tritos cycles (≈ 33 years minus 3 months) come close (≈ 434.044 anomalistic months), so eclipses are similar in these groupings.

Series members between 1801 and 2200
August 28, 1802 (Saros 122)	July 27, 1813 (Saros 123)	June 26, 1824 (Saros 124)	May 27, 1835 (Saros 125)	April 25, 1846 (Saros 126)
March 25, 1857 (Saros 127)	February 23, 1868 (Saros 128)	January 22, 1879 (Saros 129)	December 22, 1889 (Saros 130)	November 22, 1900 (Saros 131)
October 22, 1911 (Saros 132)	September 21, 1922 (Saros 133)	August 21, 1933 (Saros 134)	July 20, 1944 (Saros 135)	June 20, 1955 (Saros 136)
May 20, 1966 (Saros 137)	April 18, 1977 (Saros 138)	March 18, 1988 (Saros 139)	February 16, 1999 (Saros 140)	January 15, 2010 (Saros 141)
December 14, 2020 (Saros 142)	November 14, 2031 (Saros 143)	October 14, 2042 (Saros 144)	September 12, 2053 (Saros 145)	August 12, 2064 (Saros 146)
July 13, 2075 (Saros 147)	June 11, 2086 (Saros 148)	May 11, 2097 (Saros 149)	April 11, 2108 (Saros 150)	March 11, 2119 (Saros 151)
February 8, 2130 (Saros 152)	January 8, 2141 (Saros 153)	December 8, 2151 (Saros 154)	November 7, 2162 (Saros 155)	October 7, 2173 (Saros 156)
September 4, 2184 (Saros 157)	August 5, 2195 (Saros 158)			

=== Inex series ===
This eclipse is a part of the long period inex cycle, repeating at alternating nodes, every 358 synodic months (≈ 10,571.95 days, or 29 years minus 20 days). Their appearance and longitude are irregular due to a lack of synchronization with the anomalistic month (period of perigee). However, groupings of 3 inex cycles (≈ 87 years minus 2 months) comes close (≈ 1,151.02 anomalistic months), so eclipses are similar in these groupings.

Series members between 1801 and 2200
April 3, 1829 (Saros 136)	March 15, 1858 (Saros 137)	February 22, 1887 (Saros 138)
February 3, 1916 (Saros 139)	January 14, 1945 (Saros 140)	December 24, 1973 (Saros 141)
December 4, 2002 (Saros 142)	November 14, 2031 (Saros 143)	October 24, 2060 (Saros 144)
October 4, 2089 (Saros 145)	September 15, 2118 (Saros 146)	August 26, 2147 (Saros 147)
August 4, 2176 (Saros 148)		
