= Solar eclipse of June 29, 1927 =

Total eclipse

- Total eclipse
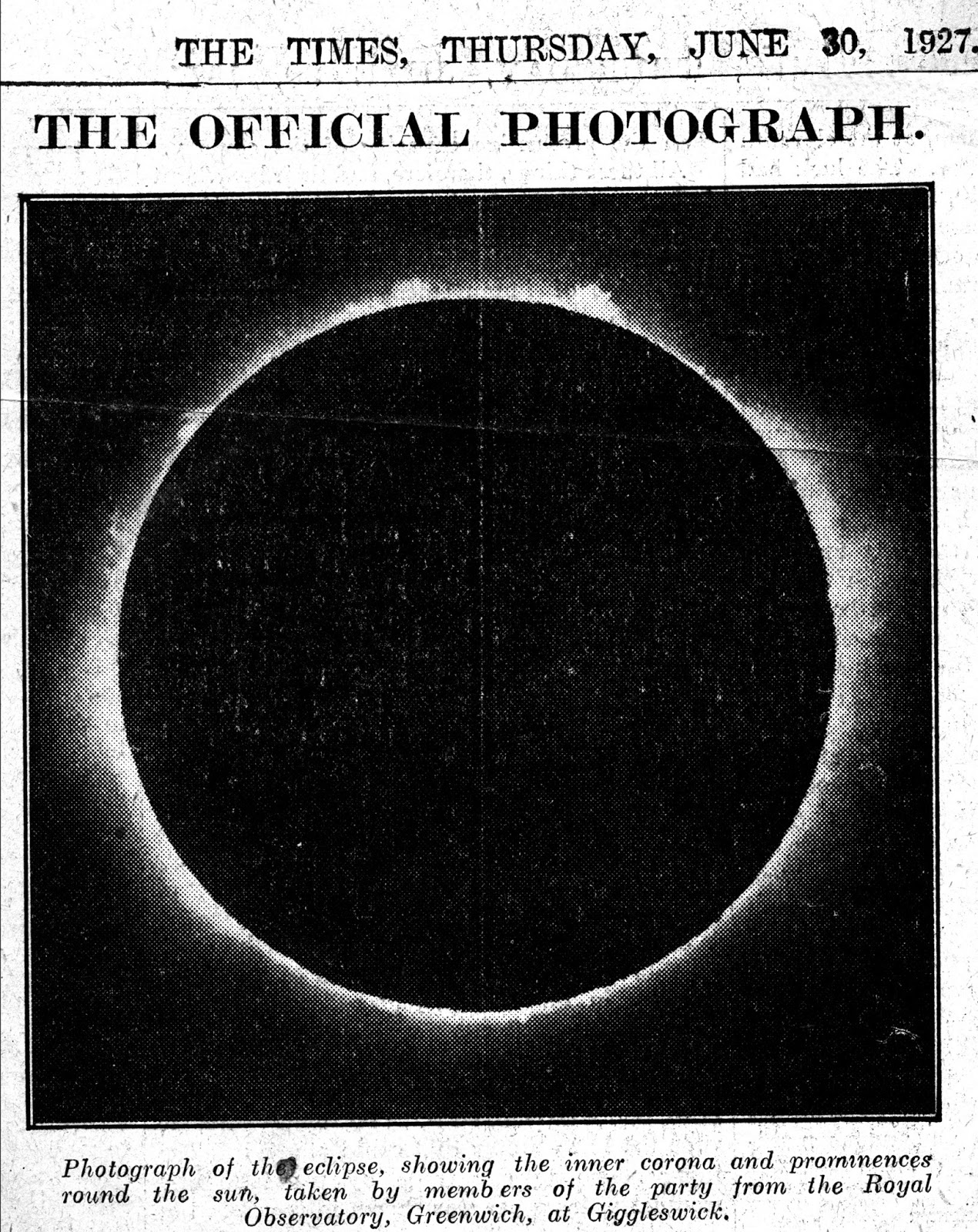
- Totality seen from Giggleswick, England taken by the Royal Observatory, Greenwich

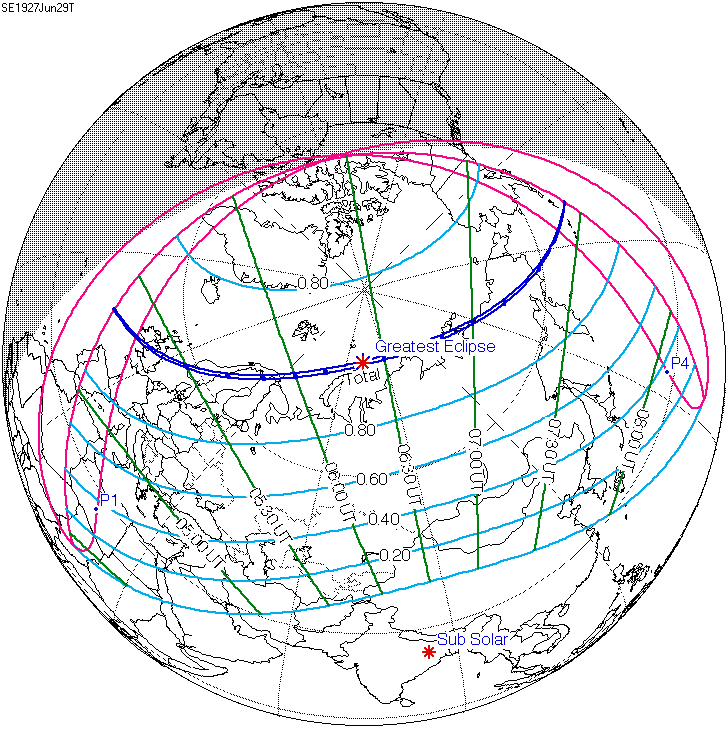
- Map
- Gamma: 0.8163
- Magnitude: 1.0128

Maximum eclipse
- Duration: 50 s (0 min 50 s)
- Coordinates: 78.1°N 73.8°E
- Max. width of band: 77 km (48 mi)

Times (UTC)
- Greatest eclipse: 6:23:27

References
- Saros: 145 (17 of 77)
- Catalog # (SE5000): 9344

A total solar eclipse occurred at the Moon's ascending node of orbit between Tuesday, June 28 and Wednesday, June 29, 1927, with a magnitude of 1.0128. A solar eclipse occurs when the Moon passes between Earth and the Sun, thereby totally or partly obscuring the image of the Sun for a viewer on Earth. A total solar eclipse occurs when the Moon's apparent diameter is larger than the Sun's, blocking all direct sunlight, turning day into darkness. Totality occurs in a narrow path across Earth's surface, with the partial solar eclipse visible over a surrounding region thousands of kilometres wide. Occurring about 20 hours after perigee (on June 28, 1927, at 10:40 UTC), the Moon's apparent diameter was larger.

The path of totality crossed far northern Europe and Asia, including the United Kingdom, Norway, Sweden, Finland and Soviet Union (today's Russia) on June 29 (Wednesday), and finally passed Amukta in Alaska on June 28 (Tuesday). A partial eclipse was visible for parts of Europe, North Africa, North Asia, and northern North America.

== Observation ==
=== United Kingdom ===
London, Midland and Scottish Railway advertising poster

This was the first total eclipse visible from British mainland soil for 203 years. The Astronomer Royal set up a camp to observe the eclipse from the grounds of Giggleswick School in North Yorkshire, which was on the line of totality. An observer at Southport, where an estimated quarter of a million people were on the shore to watch, described the eclipse for the Journal of the Royal Astronomical Society of Canada, describing it as "those memorable 23 seconds ... a landmark forever in the lives of those privileged to see for the first time the Sun's Corona, whose secrets are only revealed to us for some few minutes in each century."

This eclipse is referenced in the closing pages of Dorothy L. Sayers' novel Unnatural Death. Frances Brody's 2017 novel Death in the Stars is set at Giggleswick School while crowds were there to view the eclipse.

Virginia Woolf recorded her impression of the eclipse in her diary, describing the initial darkness dourly: "Suddenly the light went out. We had fallen. It was extinct. The earth was dead." Describing the sensation of the eclipse ending, she wrote "At first with a miraculous glittering and ethereality, later normally almost, but with a great sense of relief. It was like a recovery."

== Eclipse details ==
Shown below are two tables displaying details about this particular solar eclipse. The first table outlines times at which the Moon's penumbra or umbra attains the specific parameter, and the second table describes various other parameters pertaining to this eclipse.

June 29, 1927 Solar Eclipse Times
Event	Time (UTC)
First Penumbral External Contact	1927 June 29 at 04:00:07.6 UTC
First Umbral External Contact	1927 June 29 at 05:20:27.1 UTC
First Central Line	1927 June 29 at 05:20:38.0 UTC
First Umbral Internal Contact	1927 June 29 at 05:20:49.1 UTC
Greatest Duration	1927 June 29 at 06:21:22.6 UTC
Greatest Eclipse	1927 June 29 at 06:23:27.1 UTC
Equatorial Conjunction	1927 June 29 at 06:27:51.0 UTC
Ecliptic Conjunction	1927 June 29 at 06:32:16.1 UTC
Last Umbral Internal Contact	1927 June 29 at 07:26:05.2 UTC
Last Central Line	1927 June 29 at 07:26:13.4 UTC
Last Umbral External Contact	1927 June 29 at 07:26:21.6 UTC
Last Penumbral External Contact	1927 June 29 at 08:46:50.3 UTC

June 29, 1927 Solar Eclipse Parameters
Parameter	Value
Eclipse Magnitude	1.01277
Eclipse Obscuration	1.02570
Gamma	0.81630
Sun Right Ascension	06h28m24.1s
Sun Declination	+23°17'17.5"
Sun Semi-Diameter	15'43.9"
Sun Equatorial Horizontal Parallax	08.6"
Moon Right Ascension	06h28m13.9s
Moon Declination	+24°04'25.1"
Moon Semi-Diameter	15'47.4"
Moon Equatorial Horizontal Parallax	0°57'56.9"
ΔT	24.4 s

== Eclipse season ==
This eclipse is part of an eclipse season, a period, roughly every six months, when eclipses occur. Only two (or occasionally three) eclipse seasons occur each year, and each season lasts about 35 days and repeats just short of six months (173 days) later; thus two full eclipse seasons always occur each year. Either two or three eclipses happen each eclipse season. In the sequence below, each eclipse is separated by a fortnight.

Eclipse season of June 1927
June 15 Descending node (full moon)	June 29 Ascending node (new moon)
Total lunar eclipse Lunar Saros 119	Total solar eclipse Solar Saros 145

== Related eclipses ==
=== Eclipses in 1927 ===
- An annular solar eclipse on January 3.
- A total lunar eclipse on June 15.
- A total solar eclipse on June 29.
- A total lunar eclipse on December 8.
- A partial solar eclipse on December 24.

=== Metonic ===
- Preceded by: Solar eclipse of September 10, 1923
- Followed by: Solar eclipse of April 18, 1931

=== Tzolkinex ===
- Preceded by: Solar eclipse of May 18, 1920
- Followed by: Solar eclipse of August 10, 1934

=== Half-Saros ===
- Preceded by: Lunar eclipse of June 24, 1918
- Followed by: Lunar eclipse of July 4, 1936

=== Tritos ===
- Preceded by: Solar eclipse of July 30, 1916
- Followed by: Solar eclipse of May 29, 1938

=== Solar Saros 145 ===
- Preceded by: Solar eclipse of June 17, 1909
- Followed by: Solar eclipse of July 9, 1945

=== Inex ===
- Preceded by: Solar eclipse of July 18, 1898
- Followed by: Solar eclipse of June 8, 1956

=== Triad ===
- Preceded by: Solar eclipse of August 27, 1840
- Followed by: Solar eclipse of April 29, 2014

=== Solar eclipses of 1924–1928 ===
This eclipse is a member of a semester series. An eclipse in a semester series of solar eclipses repeats approximately every 177 days and 4 hours (a semester) at alternating nodes of the Moon's orbit.

The partial solar eclipses on March 5, 1924 and August 30, 1924 occur in the previous lunar year eclipse set, and the solar eclipses on May 19, 1928 and November 12, 1928 occur in the next lunar year eclipse set.

Solar eclipse series sets from 1924 to 1928
Ascending node			Descending node		
Saros	Map	Gamma	Saros	Map	Gamma
115	July 31, 1924 Partial	−1.4459	120	January 24, 1925 Total	0.8661
125	July 20, 1925 Annular	−0.7193	130 Totality in Sumatra, Indonesia	January 14, 1926 Total	0.1973
135	July 9, 1926 Annular	0.0538	140	January 3, 1927 Annular	−0.4956
145	June 29, 1927 Total	0.8163	150	December 24, 1927 Partial	−1.2416
155	June 17, 1928 Partial	1.5107			

=== Saros 145 ===
This eclipse is a part of Saros series 145, repeating every 18 years, 11 days, and containing 77 events. The series started with a partial solar eclipse on January 4, 1639. It contains an annular eclipse on June 6, 1891; a hybrid eclipse on June 17, 1909; and total eclipses from June 29, 1927 through September 9, 2648. The series ends at member 77 as a partial eclipse on April 17, 3009. Its eclipses are tabulated in three columns; every third eclipse in the same column is one exeligmos apart, so they all cast shadows over approximately the same parts of the Earth.

The longest duration of annularity was produced by member 15 at 6 seconds (by default) on June 6, 1891, and the longest duration of totality will be produced by member 50 at 7 minutes, 12 seconds on June 25, 2522. All eclipses in this series occur at the Moon’s ascending node of orbit.

Series members 10–32 occur between 1801 and 2200:
10	11	12
April 13, 1801	April 24, 1819	May 4, 1837
13	14	15
May 16, 1855	May 26, 1873	June 6, 1891
16	17	18
June 17, 1909	June 29, 1927	July 9, 1945
19	20	21
July 20, 1963	July 31, 1981	August 11, 1999
22	23	24
August 21, 2017	September 2, 2035	September 12, 2053
25	26	27
September 23, 2071	October 4, 2089	October 16, 2107
28	29	30
October 26, 2125	November 7, 2143	November 17, 2161
31	32	
November 28, 2179	December 9, 2197	

=== Metonic series ===
The metonic series repeats eclipses every 19 years (6939.69 days), lasting about 5 cycles. Eclipses occur in nearly the same calendar date. In addition, the octon subseries repeats 1/5 of that or every 3.8 years (1387.94 days). All eclipses in this table occur at the Moon's ascending node.

23 eclipse events between February 3, 1859 and June 29, 1946
February 1–3	November 21–22	September 8–10	June 28–29	April 16–18
109	111	113	115	117
February 3, 1859	November 21, 1862		June 28, 1870	April 16, 1874
119	121	123	125	127
February 2, 1878	November 21, 1881	September 8, 1885	June 28, 1889	April 16, 1893
129	131	133	135	137
February 1, 1897	November 22, 1900	September 9, 1904	June 28, 1908	April 17, 1912
139	141	143	145	147
February 3, 1916	November 22, 1919	September 10, 1923	June 29, 1927	April 18, 1931
149	151	153	155	
February 3, 1935	November 21, 1938	September 10, 1942	June 29, 1946	

=== Tritos series ===
This eclipse is a part of a tritos cycle, repeating at alternating nodes every 135 synodic months (≈ 3986.63 days, or 11 years minus 1 month). Their appearance and longitude are irregular due to a lack of synchronization with the anomalistic month (period of perigee), but groupings of 3 tritos cycles (≈ 33 years minus 3 months) come close (≈ 434.044 anomalistic months), so eclipses are similar in these groupings.

The partial solar eclipses on November 16, 2134 (part of Saros 164) and October 16, 2145 (part of Saros 165) are also a part of this series but are not included in the table below.

Series members between 1801 and 2069
June 6, 1807 (Saros 134)	May 5, 1818 (Saros 135)	April 3, 1829 (Saros 136)	March 4, 1840 (Saros 137)	February 1, 1851 (Saros 138)
December 31, 1861 (Saros 139)	November 30, 1872 (Saros 140)	October 30, 1883 (Saros 141)	September 29, 1894 (Saros 142)	August 30, 1905 (Saros 143)
July 30, 1916 (Saros 144)	June 29, 1927 (Saros 145)	May 29, 1938 (Saros 146)	April 28, 1949 (Saros 147)	March 27, 1960 (Saros 148)
February 25, 1971 (Saros 149)	January 25, 1982 (Saros 150)	December 24, 1992 (Saros 151)	November 23, 2003 (Saros 152)	October 23, 2014 (Saros 153)
September 21, 2025 (Saros 154)	August 21, 2036 (Saros 155)	July 22, 2047 (Saros 156)	June 21, 2058 (Saros 157)	May 20, 2069 (Saros 158)

=== Inex series ===
This eclipse is a part of the long period inex cycle, repeating at alternating nodes, every 358 synodic months (≈ 10,571.95 days, or 29 years minus 20 days). Their appearance and longitude are irregular due to a lack of synchronization with the anomalistic month (period of perigee). However, groupings of 3 inex cycles (≈ 87 years minus 2 months) comes close (≈ 1,151.02 anomalistic months), so eclipses are similar in these groupings.

Series members between 1801 and 2200
September 17, 1811 (Saros 141)	August 27, 1840 (Saros 142)	August 7, 1869 (Saros 143)
July 18, 1898 (Saros 144)	June 29, 1927 (Saros 145)	June 8, 1956 (Saros 146)
May 19, 1985 (Saros 147)	April 29, 2014 (Saros 148)	April 9, 2043 (Saros 149)
March 19, 2072 (Saros 150)	February 28, 2101 (Saros 151)	February 8, 2130 (Saros 152)
January 19, 2159 (Saros 153)	December 29, 2187 (Saros 154)	

== See also ==
- List of solar eclipses visible from Russia
- List of solar eclipses visible from the United Kingdom

== Sources ==
- Earth visibility chart and eclipse statistics Eclipse Predictions by Fred Espenak, NASA/GSFC
  - Google interactive map
  - Besselian elements
- Fotos of Solar Corona June 29, 1927
- Russia expedition for solar eclipse of June 29, 1927
