= Solar eclipse of August 30, 1905 =

Total eclipse

- Total eclipse

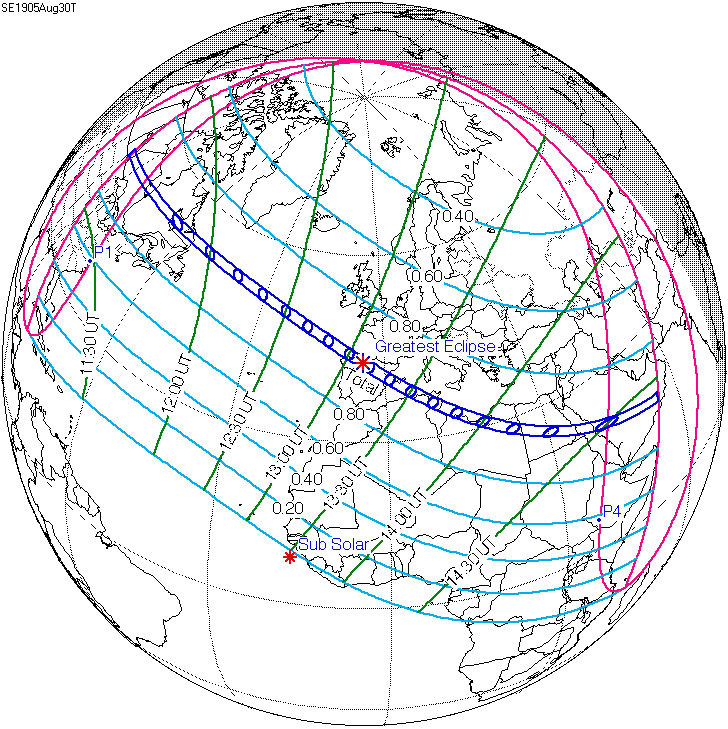
- Map
- Gamma: 0.5708
- Magnitude: 1.0477

Maximum eclipse
- Duration: 226 s (3 min 46 s)
- Coordinates: 42.5°N 4.3°W
- Max. width of band: 192 km (119 mi)

Times (UTC)
- Greatest eclipse: 13:07:26

References
- Saros: 143 (17 of 72)
- Catalog # (SE5000): 9293

A total solar eclipse occurred at the Moon's ascending node of orbit on Wednesday, August 30, 1905, with a magnitude of 1.0477. A solar eclipse occurs when the Moon passes between Earth and the Sun, thereby totally or partly obscuring the image of the Sun for a viewer on Earth. A total solar eclipse occurs when the Moon's apparent diameter is larger than the Sun's, blocking all direct sunlight, turning day into darkness. Totality occurs in a narrow path across Earth's surface, with the partial solar eclipse visible over a surrounding region thousands of kilometres wide. Occurring about 1.9 days before perigee (on September 1, 1905, at 11:10 UTC), the Moon's apparent diameter was larger.

Totality was visible from Canada, Newfoundland Colony (now belonging to Canada), Spain, French Algeria (now Algeria), French Tunisia (now Tunisia), Ottoman Tripolitania (now Libya) include the capital Tripoli, Egypt, Ottoman Empire (the parts now belonging to Saudi Arabia) including Mecca, Emirate of Jabal Shammar (now belonging to Saudi Arabia), Aden Protectorate (now belonging to Yemen), and Muscat and Oman (now Oman). A partial eclipse was visible for parts of Eastern North America, Europe, Northern Africa, Central Africa, and West Asia.

This eclipse was observed from Arija and Alcalà de Xivert in Spain. It was also observed by members of the British Astronomical Association from various locations. It was the last total solar eclipse visible in Spain until the eclipse of August 12, 2026.

== Observations ==
Teams of the United States Naval Observatory observed the eclipse from three different locations. Two were near the centerline of the path of totality: Daroca, Spain, at an altitude of 2,500 feet (760 m), and Guelma, French Algeria, at an altitude of 1,500 feet (460 m). The third was near the southern edge of the path of totality, at Porta Coeli Charterhouse, Valencia, Spain, at an altitude of 1,000 feet (300 m). The leader and some team members departed from New York City by ship on July 3 and arrived at Grao, the port of Valencia, on July 20, while other team members had already arrived there in advance. The weather was clear at all three locations, and the observations were successful. The team took images of the corona and observed the spectrum.

== Eclipse details ==
Shown below are two tables displaying details about this particular solar eclipse. The first table outlines times at which the Moon's penumbra or umbra attains the specific parameter, and the second table describes various other parameters pertaining to this eclipse.

August 30, 1905 Solar Eclipse Times
| Event | Time (UTC) |
|---|---|
| First Penumbral External Contact | 1905 August 30 at 10:37:28.1 UTC |
| First Umbral External Contact | 1905 August 30 at 11:40:16.4 UTC |
| First Central Line | 1905 August 30 at 11:41:22.2 UTC |
| First Umbral Internal Contact | 1905 August 30 at 11:42:28.2 UTC |
| Equatorial Conjunction | 1905 August 30 at 12:50:08.0 UTC |
| Greatest Duration | 1905 August 30 at 13:07:15.3 UTC |
| Greatest Eclipse | 1905 August 30 at 13:07:25.8 UTC |
| Ecliptic Conjunction | 1905 August 30 at 13:13:19.1 UTC |
| Last Umbral Internal Contact | 1905 August 30 at 14:32:33.8 UTC |
| Last Central Line | 1905 August 30 at 14:33:41.6 UTC |
| Last Umbral External Contact | 1905 August 30 at 14:34:49.2 UTC |
| Last Penumbral External Contact | 1905 August 30 at 15:37:27.7 UTC |

August 30, 1905 Solar Eclipse Parameters
| Parameter | Value |
|---|---|
| Eclipse Magnitude | 1.04766 |
| Eclipse Obscuration | 1.09759 |
| Gamma | 0.57084 |
| Sun Right Ascension | 10h32m53.1s |
| Sun Declination | +09°08'33.0" |
| Sun Semi-Diameter | 15'50.7" |
| Sun Equatorial Horizontal Parallax | 08.7" |
| Moon Right Ascension | 10h33m31.6s |
| Moon Declination | +09°41'25.8" |
| Moon Semi-Diameter | 16'22.5" |
| Moon Equatorial Horizontal Parallax | 1°00'05.8" |
| ΔT | 4.8 s |

== Eclipse season ==
This eclipse is part of an eclipse season, a period, roughly every six months, when eclipses occur. Only two (or occasionally three) eclipse seasons occur each year, and each season lasts about 35 days and repeats just short of six months (173 days) later; thus two full eclipse seasons always occur each year. Either two or three eclipses happen each eclipse season. In the sequence below, each eclipse is separated by a fortnight.

Eclipse season of August 1905
| August 15 Descending node (full moon) | August 30 Ascending node (new moon) |
|---|---|
| Partial lunar eclipse Lunar Saros 117 | Total solar eclipse Solar Saros 143 |

== Related eclipses ==
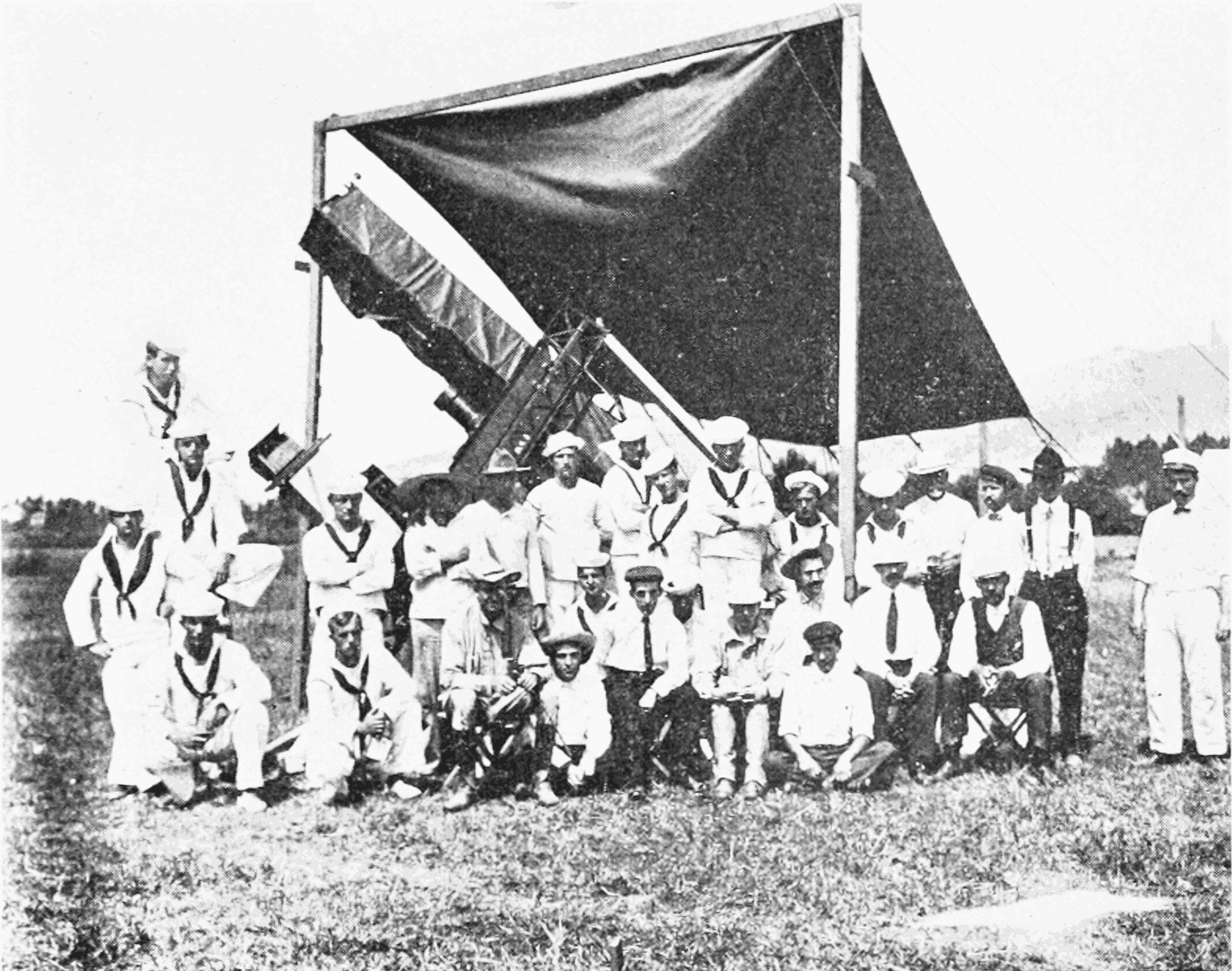
An eclipse-viewing party at Daroca

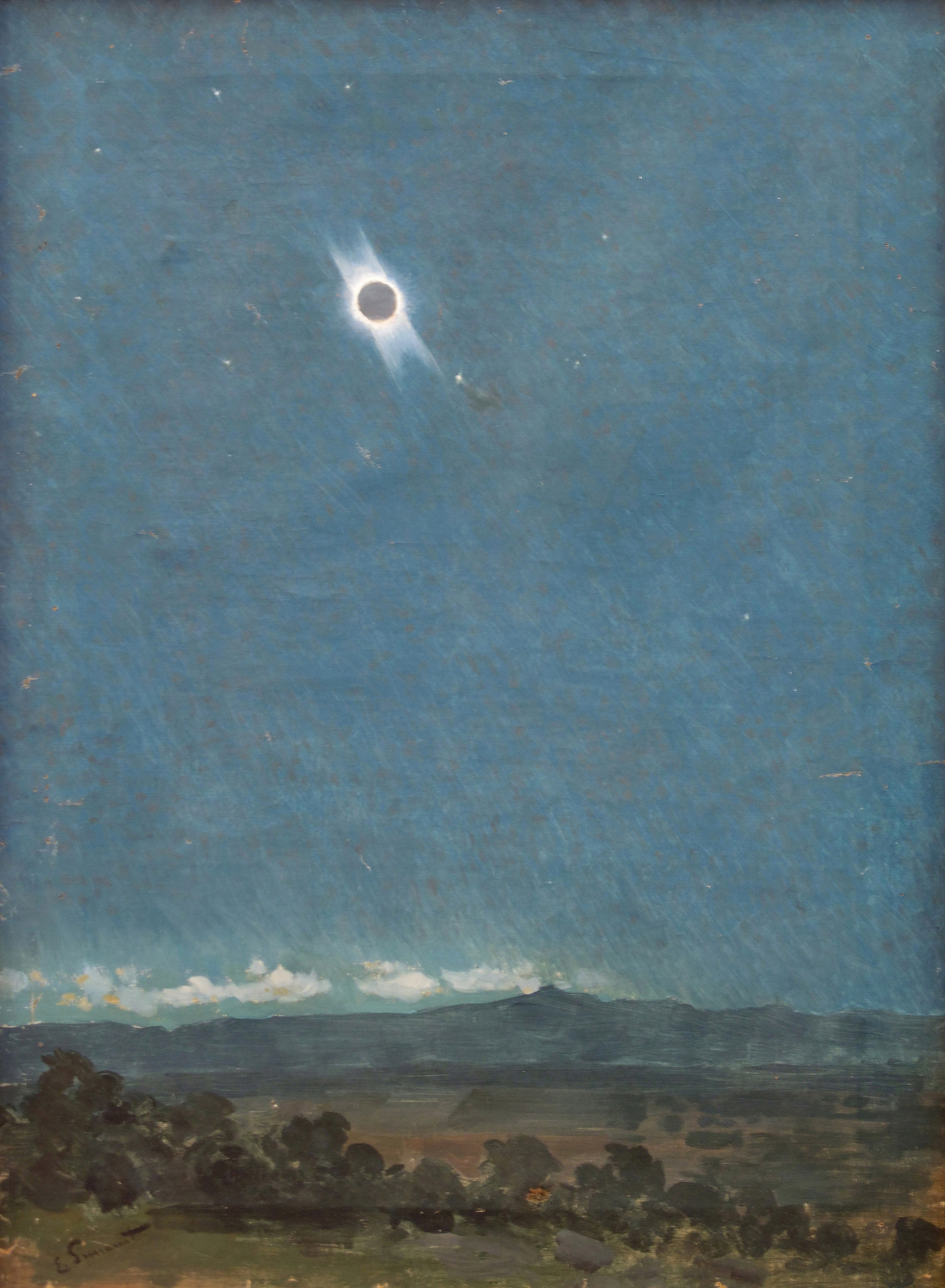
Painting by Enrique Simonet

Totality from Sagunto, Spain

=== Eclipses in 1905 ===
- A partial lunar eclipse on February 19.
- An annular solar eclipse on March 6.
- A partial lunar eclipse on August 15.
- A total solar eclipse on August 30.

=== Metonic ===
- Preceded by: Solar eclipse of November 11, 1901
- Followed by: Solar eclipse of June 17, 1909

=== Tzolkinex ===
- Preceded by: Solar eclipse of July 18, 1898
- Followed by: Solar eclipse of October 10, 1912

=== Half-Saros ===
- Preceded by: Lunar eclipse of August 23, 1896
- Followed by: Lunar eclipse of September 4, 1914

=== Tritos ===
- Preceded by: Solar eclipse of September 29, 1894
- Followed by: Solar eclipse of July 30, 1916

=== Solar Saros 143 ===
- Preceded by: Solar eclipse of August 19, 1887
- Followed by: Solar eclipse of September 10, 1923

=== Inex ===
- Preceded by: Solar eclipse of September 17, 1876
- Followed by: Solar eclipse of August 10, 1934

=== Triad ===
- Preceded by: Solar eclipse of October 29, 1818
- Followed by: Solar eclipse of June 30, 1992

=== Solar eclipses of 1902–1906 ===
This eclipse is a member of a semester series. An eclipse in a semester series of solar eclipses repeats approximately every 177 days and 4 hours (a semester) at alternating nodes of the Moon's orbit.

The partial solar eclipses on May 7, 1902 and October 31, 1902 occur in the previous lunar year eclipse set, and the partial solar eclipse on July 21, 1906 occurs in the next lunar year eclipse set.

Solar eclipse series sets from 1902 to 1906
| Descending node | | | Ascending node | | |
| Saros | Map | Gamma | Saros | Map | Gamma |
| 108 | April 8, 1902 Partial | 1.5024 | 113 | October 1, 1902 | |
| 118 | March 29, 1903 Annular | 0.8413 | 123 | September 21, 1903 Total | −0.8967 |
| 128 | March 17, 1904 Annular | 0.1299 | 133 | September 9, 1904 Total | −0.1625 |
| 138 | March 6, 1905 Annular | −0.5768 | 143 | August 30, 1905 Total | 0.5708 |
| 148 | February 23, 1906 Partial | −1.2479 | 153 | August 20, 1906 Partial | 1.3731 |

=== Saros 143 ===
This eclipse is a part of Saros series 143, repeating every 18 years, 11 days, and containing 72 events. The series started with a partial solar eclipse on March 7, 1617. It contains total eclipses from June 24, 1797 through October 24, 1995; hybrid eclipses from November 3, 2013 through December 6, 2067; and annular eclipses from December 16, 2085 through September 16, 2536. The series ends at member 72 as a partial eclipse on April 23, 2897. Its eclipses are tabulated in three columns; every third eclipse in the same column is one exeligmos apart, so they all cast shadows over approximately the same parts of the Earth.

The longest duration of totality was produced by member 16 at 3 minutes, 50 seconds on August 19, 1887, and the longest duration of annularity will be produced by member 51 at 4 minutes, 54 seconds on September 6, 2518. All eclipses in this series occur at the Moon’s ascending node of orbit.

Series members 12–33 occur between 1801 and 2200:
| 12 | 13 | 14 |
|---|---|---|
| July 6, 1815 | July 17, 1833 | July 28, 1851 |
| 15 | 16 | 17 |
| August 7, 1869 | August 19, 1887 | August 30, 1905 |
| 18 | 19 | 20 |
| September 10, 1923 | September 21, 1941 | October 2, 1959 |
| 21 | 22 | 23 |
| October 12, 1977 | October 24, 1995 | November 3, 2013 |
| 24 | 25 | 26 |
| November 14, 2031 | November 25, 2049 | December 6, 2067 |
| 27 | 28 | 29 |
| December 16, 2085 | December 29, 2103 | January 8, 2122 |
| 30 | 31 | 32 |
| January 20, 2140 | January 30, 2158 | February 10, 2176 |
33
February 21, 2194

=== Metonic series ===
The metonic series repeats eclipses every 19 years (6939.69 days), lasting about 5 cycles. Eclipses occur in nearly the same calendar date. In addition, the octon subseries repeats 1/5 of that or every 3.8 years (1387.94 days). All eclipses in this table occur at the Moon's ascending node.

25 eclipse events between April 5, 1837 and June 17, 1928
| April 5–6 | January 22–23 | November 10–11 | August 28–30 | June 17–18 |
| 107 | 109 | 111 | 113 | 115 |
|---|---|---|---|---|
| April 5, 1837 | January 22, 1841 | November 10, 1844 | August 28, 1848 | June 17, 1852 |
| 117 | 119 | 121 | 123 | 125 |
| April 5, 1856 | January 23, 1860 | November 11, 1863 | August 29, 1867 | June 18, 1871 |
| 127 | 129 | 131 | 133 | 135 |
| April 6, 1875 | January 22, 1879 | November 10, 1882 | August 29, 1886 | June 17, 1890 |
| 137 | 139 | 141 | 143 | 145 |
| April 6, 1894 | January 22, 1898 | November 11, 1901 | August 30, 1905 | June 17, 1909 |
| 147 | 149 | 151 | 153 | 155 |
| April 6, 1913 | January 23, 1917 | November 10, 1920 | August 30, 1924 | June 17, 1928 |

=== Tritos series ===
This eclipse is a part of a tritos cycle, repeating at alternating nodes every 135 synodic months (≈ 3986.63 days, or 11 years minus 1 month). Their appearance and longitude are irregular due to a lack of synchronization with the anomalistic month (period of perigee), but groupings of 3 tritos cycles (≈ 33 years minus 3 months) come close (≈ 434.044 anomalistic months), so eclipses are similar in these groupings.

The partial solar eclipses on November 16, 2134 (part of Saros 164) and October 16, 2145 (part of Saros 165) are also a part of this series but are not included in the table below.

Series members between 1801 and 2069
| June 6, 1807 (Saros 134) | May 5, 1818 (Saros 135) | April 3, 1829 (Saros 136) | March 4, 1840 (Saros 137) | February 1, 1851 (Saros 138) |
| December 31, 1861 (Saros 139) | November 30, 1872 (Saros 140) | October 30, 1883 (Saros 141) | September 29, 1894 (Saros 142) | August 30, 1905 (Saros 143) |
| July 30, 1916 (Saros 144) | June 29, 1927 (Saros 145) | May 29, 1938 (Saros 146) | April 28, 1949 (Saros 147) | March 27, 1960 (Saros 148) |
| February 25, 1971 (Saros 149) | January 25, 1982 (Saros 150) | December 24, 1992 (Saros 151) | November 23, 2003 (Saros 152) | October 23, 2014 (Saros 153) |
| September 21, 2025 (Saros 154) | August 21, 2036 (Saros 155) | July 22, 2047 (Saros 156) | June 21, 2058 (Saros 157) | May 20, 2069 (Saros 158) |

=== Inex series ===
This eclipse is a part of the long period inex cycle, repeating at alternating nodes, every 358 synodic months (≈ 10,571.95 days, or 29 years minus 20 days). Their appearance and longitude are irregular due to a lack of synchronization with the anomalistic month (period of perigee). However, groupings of 3 inex cycles (≈ 87 years minus 2 months) comes close (≈ 1,151.02 anomalistic months), so eclipses are similar in these groupings.

Series members between 1801 and 2200
| October 29, 1818 (Saros 140) | October 9, 1847 (Saros 141) | September 17, 1876 (Saros 142) |
| August 30, 1905 (Saros 143) | August 10, 1934 (Saros 144) | July 20, 1963 (Saros 145) |
| June 30, 1992 (Saros 146) | June 10, 2021 (Saros 147) | May 20, 2050 (Saros 148) |
| May 1, 2079 (Saros 149) | April 11, 2108 (Saros 150) | March 21, 2137 (Saros 151) |
| March 2, 2166 (Saros 152) | February 10, 2195 (Saros 153) | |
