= Solar eclipse of October 19, 1865 =

Annular solar eclipse October 19, 1865

- Annular eclipse
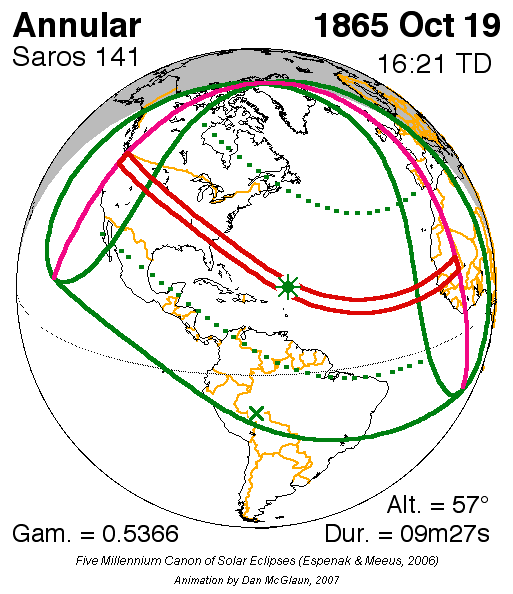
- Map
- Gamma: 0.5366
- Magnitude: 0.9263

Maximum eclipse
- Duration: 567 s (9 min 27 s)
- Coordinates: 21.3°N 60.2°W
- Max. width of band: 326 km (203 mi)

Times (UTC)
- Greatest eclipse: 16:21:14

References
- Saros: 141 (15 of 70)
- Catalog # (SE5000): 9200

An annular solar eclipse occurred at the Moon's ascending node of orbit on Thursday, October 19, 1865, with a magnitude of 0.9263. A solar eclipse occurs when the Moon passes between Earth and the Sun, thereby totally or partly obscuring the image of the Sun for a viewer on Earth. An annular solar eclipse occurs when the Moon's apparent diameter is smaller than the Sun's, blocking most of the Sun's light and causing the Sun to look like an annulus (ring). An annular eclipse appears as a partial eclipse over a region of the Earth thousands of kilometres wide. Occurring only about 9 hours after apogee (on October 19, 1865, at 7:05 UTC), the Moon's apparent diameter was smaller.

The path of annularity was visible from parts of modern-day Washington, Oregon, Montana, Idaho, Wyoming, South Dakota, Nebraska, Colorado, Kansas, Iowa, Missouri, Illinois, Arkansas, Indiana, Kentucky, Tennessee, Alabama, North Carolina, South Carolina, Georgia, Senegal, Mauritania, and Mali. A partial solar eclipse was also visible for parts of North America, Central America, the Caribbean, northern South America, Western Europe, West Africa.

== Description ==
The greatest eclipse was at 16:21:14 UTC (12:21 local time) at 21.3°N 60.2°W northeast of Antigua and Barbuda and lasted 9 min 27 sec. The maximum width of band was 326 km (203 mi).

The eclipse was visible in North America (except for the Yukon, Alaska and the northernmost part of Greenland), Central America, the Caribbean South America including, the northern parts of Peru and Bolivia and most of Brazil, the westernmost parts of Africa and Europe (westernmost Spain and Portugal, Ireland and parts of Scotland). Areas that were in the edge of the eclipse included the Galapagos Islands. In North America, it occurred in the morning, in South America, midday and in Africa and Europe, near the evening hours.

Areas that were inside the umbral portion included the United States such as parts of the north of the state Oregon, Washington Territory (now state), close to the 49th parallel and distant from the Pacific, Idaho, the Cheyenne and the Lakota areas, Nebraska Territory (now state), the states of Kansas, Missouri, southern Illinois, southern Indiana, western Kentucky, much of Tennessee, the northeast corner of Alabama, parts of the north of Georgia, the west of North Carolina and nearly all of South Carolina. Off the coast of Africa, it included the Cape Verdean Islands of Sotavento and Boa Vista Island, at the time a Portuguese colony. In Africa, it included most of Senegal, at the time a French colony, southern Agawedj (or Agaouedj, now Mauritania) and parts of Mali.

== Other ==
In many parts of Brazil except for the south, it was the third consecutive solar eclipse that took place, all of it appeared as partial, the last two were on October 30, 1864 and April 25, 1865, both with an umbral portion in one part.

== Eclipse details ==
Shown below are two tables displaying details about this particular solar eclipse. The first table outlines times at which the Moon's penumbra or umbra attains the specific parameter, and the second table describes various other parameters pertaining to this eclipse.

October 19, 1865 Solar Eclipse Times
Event	Time (UTC)
First Penumbral External Contact	1865 October 19 at 13:25:25.9 UTC
First Umbral External Contact	1865 October 19 at 14:37:23.4 UTC
First Central Line	1865 October 19 at 14:41:00.2 UTC
First Umbral Internal Contact	1865 October 19 at 14:44:39.3 UTC
Equatorial Conjunction	1865 October 19 at 16:03:30.6 UTC
Greatest Eclipse	1865 October 19 at 16:21:13.4 UTC
Greatest Duration	1865 October 19 at 16:26:46.3 UTC
Ecliptic Conjunction	1865 October 19 at 16:27:39.9 UTC
Last Umbral Internal Contact	1865 October 19 at 17:58:00.8 UTC
Last Central Line	1865 October 19 at 18:01:39.5 UTC
Last Umbral External Contact	1865 October 19 at 18:05:15.8 UTC
Last Penumbral External Contact	1865 October 19 at 19:17:08.8 UTC

October 19, 1865 Solar Eclipse Parameters
Parameter	Value
Eclipse Magnitude	0.92627
Eclipse Obscuration	0.85798
Gamma	0.53659
Sun Right Ascension	13h37m34.8s
Sun Declination	-10°09'34.2"
Sun Semi-Diameter	16'04.2"
Sun Equatorial Horizontal Parallax	08.8"
Moon Right Ascension	13h38m06.1s
Moon Declination	-09°41'45.0"
Moon Semi-Diameter	14'42.0"
Moon Equatorial Horizontal Parallax	0°53'56.8"
ΔT	5.2 s

== Eclipse season ==
This eclipse is part of an eclipse season, a period, roughly every six months, when eclipses occur. Only two (or occasionally three) eclipse seasons occur each year, and each season lasts about 35 days and repeats just short of six months (173 days) later; thus two full eclipse seasons always occur each year. Either two or three eclipses happen each eclipse season. In the sequence below, each eclipse is separated by a fortnight.

Eclipse season of October 1865
October 4 Descending node (full moon)	October 19 Ascending node (new moon)
Partial lunar eclipse Lunar Saros 115	Annular solar eclipse Solar Saros 141

== Related eclipses ==
=== Eclipses in 1865 ===
- A partial lunar eclipse on April 11.
- A total solar eclipse on April 25.
- A partial lunar eclipse on October 4.
- An annular solar eclipse on October 19.

=== Metonic ===
- Preceded by: Solar eclipse of December 31, 1861
- Followed by: Solar eclipse of August 7, 1869

=== Tzolkinex ===
- Preceded by: Solar eclipse of September 7, 1858
- Followed by: Solar eclipse of November 30, 1872

=== Half-Saros ===
- Preceded by: Lunar eclipse of October 13, 1856
- Followed by: Lunar eclipse of October 25, 1874

=== Tritos ===
- Preceded by: Solar eclipse of November 20, 1854
- Followed by: Solar eclipse of September 17, 1876

=== Solar Saros 141 ===
- Preceded by: Solar eclipse of October 9, 1847
- Followed by: Solar eclipse of October 30, 1883

=== Inex ===
- Preceded by: Solar eclipse of November 9, 1836
- Followed by: Solar eclipse of September 29, 1894

=== Triad ===
- Preceded by: Solar eclipse of December 18, 1778
- Followed by: Solar eclipse of August 20, 1952

=== Solar eclipses of 1862–1866 ===
This eclipse is a member of a semester series. An eclipse in a semester series of solar eclipses repeats approximately every 177 days and 4 hours (a semester) at alternating nodes of the Moon's orbit.

The partial solar eclipses on June 27, 1862 and December 21, 1862 occur in the previous lunar year eclipse set, and the partial solar eclipse on March 16, 1866 occurs in the next lunar year eclipse set.

Solar eclipse series sets from 1862 to 1866
Ascending node			Descending node		
Saros	Map	Gamma	Saros	Map	Gamma
111	November 21, 1862 Partial	−1.5052	116	May 17, 1863 Partial	1.0627
121	November 11, 1863 Annular	−0.8760	126	May 6, 1864 Hybrid	0.2622
131	October 30, 1864 Annular	−0.1816	136	April 25, 1865 Total	−0.4826
141	October 19, 1865 Annular	0.5366	146	April 15, 1866 Partial	−1.1846
151	October 8, 1866 Partial	1.2296			

=== Saros 141 ===
This eclipse is a part of Saros series 141, repeating every 18 years, 11 days, and containing 70 events. The series started with a partial solar eclipse on May 19, 1613. It contains annular eclipses from August 4, 1739 through October 14, 2640. There are no hybrid or total eclipses in this set. The series ends at member 70 as a partial eclipse on June 13, 2857. Its eclipses are tabulated in three columns; every third eclipse in the same column is one exeligmos apart, so they all cast shadows over approximately the same parts of the Earth.

The longest duration of annularity was produced by member 20 at 12 minutes, 9 seconds on December 14, 1955. All eclipses in this series occur at the Moon’s ascending node of orbit.

Series members 12–33 occur between 1801 and 2200:
12	13	14
September 17, 1811	September 28, 1829	October 9, 1847
15	16	17
October 19, 1865	October 30, 1883	November 11, 1901
18	19	20
November 22, 1919	December 2, 1937	December 14, 1955
21	22	23
December 24, 1973	January 4, 1992	January 15, 2010
24	25	26
January 26, 2028	February 5, 2046	February 17, 2064
27	28	29
February 27, 2082	March 10, 2100	March 22, 2118
30	31	32
April 1, 2136	April 12, 2154	April 23, 2172
33
May 4, 2190

=== Metonic series ===
The metonic series repeats eclipses every 19 years (6939.69 days), lasting about 5 cycles. Eclipses occur in nearly the same calendar date. In addition, the octon subseries repeats 1/5 of that or every 3.8 years (1387.94 days). All eclipses in this table occur at the Moon's ascending node.

25 eclipse events between March 14, 1801 and August 7, 1888
March 14–15	December 31–January 1	October 19–20	August 7	May 26–27
107	109	111	113	115
March 14, 1801	January 1, 1805	October 19, 1808	August 7, 1812	May 27, 1816
117	119	121	123	125
March 14, 1820	January 1, 1824	October 20, 1827	August 7, 1831	May 27, 1835
127	129	131	133	135
March 15, 1839	December 31, 1842	October 20, 1846	August 7, 1850	May 26, 1854
137	139	141	143	145
March 15, 1858	December 31, 1861	October 19, 1865	August 7, 1869	May 26, 1873
147	149	151	153	
March 15, 1877	December 31, 1880	October 19, 1884	August 7, 1888	

=== Tritos series ===
This eclipse is a part of a tritos cycle, repeating at alternating nodes every 135 synodic months (≈ 3986.63 days, or 11 years minus 1 month). Their appearance and longitude are irregular due to a lack of synchronization with the anomalistic month (period of perigee), but groupings of 3 tritos cycles (≈ 33 years minus 3 months) come close (≈ 434.044 anomalistic months), so eclipses are similar in these groupings.

The partial solar eclipse on November 4, 2116 (part of Saros 164) is also a part of this series but is not included in the table below.

Series members between 1801 and 2029
March 24, 1811 (Saros 136)	February 21, 1822 (Saros 137)	January 20, 1833 (Saros 138)	December 21, 1843 (Saros 139)	November 20, 1854 (Saros 140)
October 19, 1865 (Saros 141)	September 17, 1876 (Saros 142)	August 19, 1887 (Saros 143)	July 18, 1898 (Saros 144)	June 17, 1909 (Saros 145)
May 18, 1920 (Saros 146)	April 18, 1931 (Saros 147)	March 16, 1942 (Saros 148)	February 14, 1953 (Saros 149)	January 14, 1964 (Saros 150)
December 13, 1974 (Saros 151)	November 12, 1985 (Saros 152)	October 12, 1996 (Saros 153)	September 11, 2007 (Saros 154)	August 11, 2018 (Saros 155)
July 11, 2029 (Saros 156)

=== Inex series ===
This eclipse is a part of the long period inex cycle, repeating at alternating nodes, every 358 synodic months (≈ 10,571.95 days, or 29 years minus 20 days). Their appearance and longitude are irregular due to a lack of synchronization with the anomalistic month (period of perigee). However, groupings of 3 inex cycles (≈ 87 years minus 2 months) comes close (≈ 1,151.02 anomalistic months), so eclipses are similar in these groupings.

Series members between 1801 and 2200
November 29, 1807 (Saros 139)	November 9, 1836 (Saros 140)	October 19, 1865 (Saros 141)
September 29, 1894 (Saros 142)	September 10, 1923 (Saros 143)	August 20, 1952 (Saros 144)
July 31, 1981 (Saros 145)	July 11, 2010 (Saros 146)	June 21, 2039 (Saros 147)
May 31, 2068 (Saros 148)	May 11, 2097 (Saros 149)	April 22, 2126 (Saros 150)
April 2, 2155 (Saros 151)	March 12, 2184 (Saros 152)	

== See also ==
- List of solar eclipses in the 19th century
- List of solar eclipses visible from the United States
