= Solar eclipse of September 22, 2006 =

21st-century annular solar eclipse

- Annular eclipse
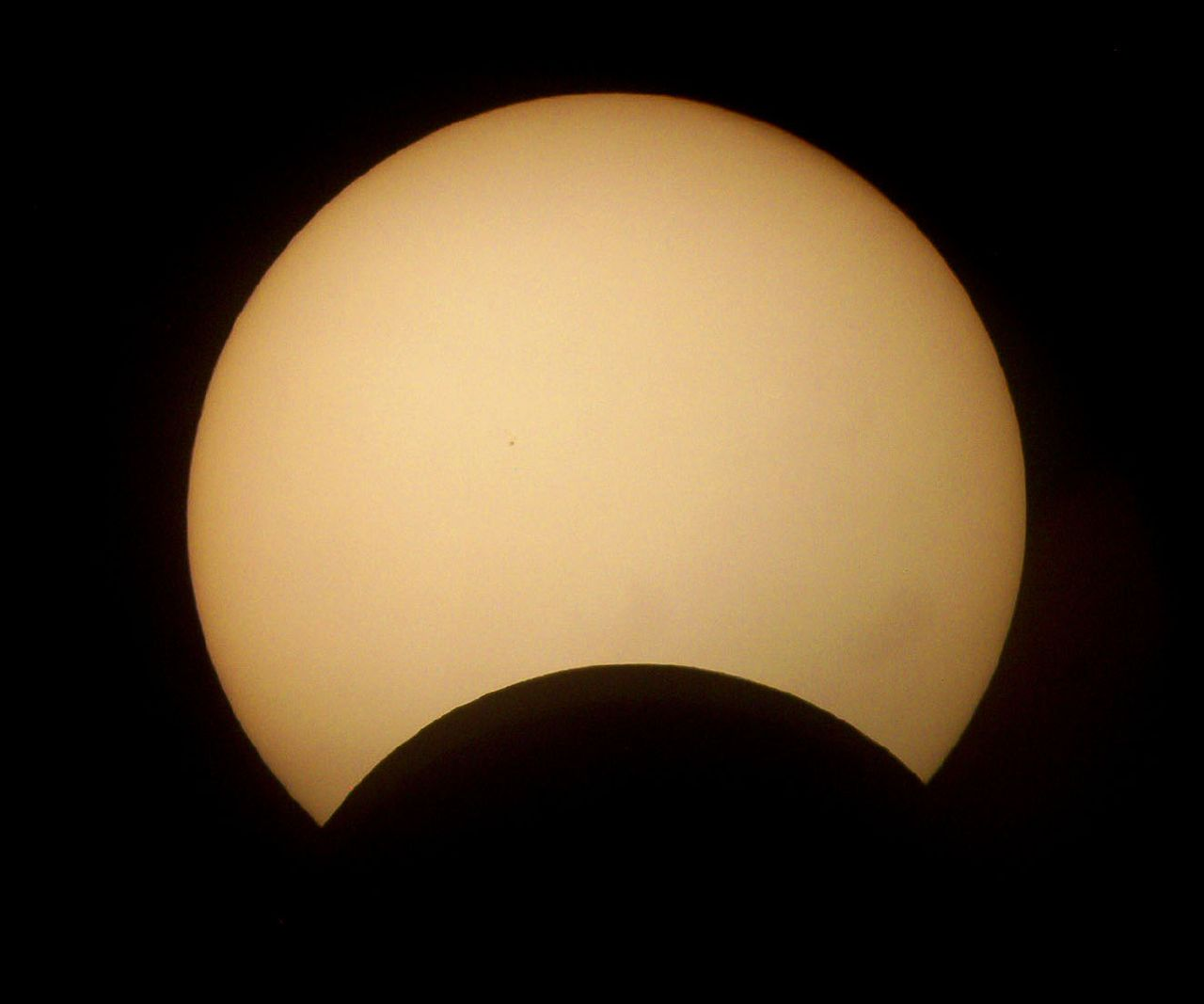
- Partial from São Paulo, Brazil

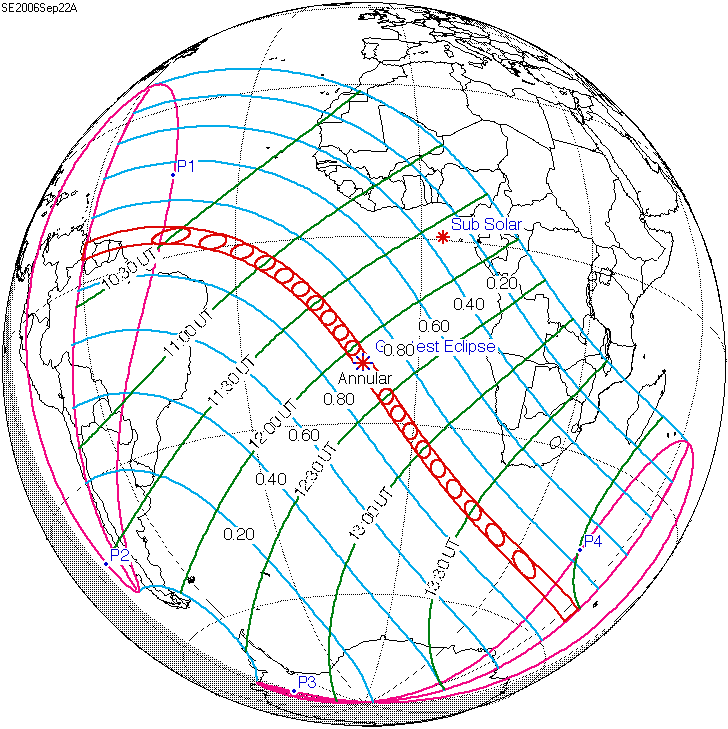
- Map
- Gamma: −0.4062
- Magnitude: 0.9352

Maximum eclipse
- Duration: 429 s (7 min 9 s)
- Coordinates: 20.6°S 9.1°W
- Max. width of band: 261 km (162 mi)

Times (UTC)
- Greatest eclipse: 11:41:16

References
- Saros: 144 (16 of 70)
- Catalog # (SE5000): 9522

An annular solar eclipse occurred at the Moon's descending node of orbit on Friday, September 22, 2006, with a magnitude of 0.9352. A solar eclipse occurs when the Moon passes between Earth and the Sun, thereby totally or partly obscuring the image of the Sun for a viewer on Earth. An annular solar eclipse occurs when the Moon's apparent diameter is smaller than the Sun's, blocking most of the Sun's light and causing the Sun to look like an annulus (ring). An annular eclipse appears as a partial eclipse over a region of the Earth thousands of kilometres wide. Occurring about 5 hours after apogee (on September 22, 2006, at 6:20 UTC), the Moon's apparent diameter was smaller.

The path of annularity of this eclipse passed through Guyana, Suriname, French Guiana, the northern tip of Roraima and Amapá of Brazil, and the southern Atlantic. A partial eclipse was visible for parts of South America, West Africa, Southern Africa, the Antarctic Peninsula, and east Antarctica.

== Images ==
Animated path

== Eclipse timing ==
=== Places experiencing annular eclipse ===
Solar Eclipse of September 22, 2006 (Local Times)
Country or territory	City or place	Start of partial eclipse	Start of annular eclipse	Maximum eclipse	End of annular eclipse	End of partial eclipse	Duration of annularity (min:s)	Duration of eclipse (hr:min)	Maximum coverage
Guyana	New Amsterdam	05:39:23 (sunrise)	05:48:44	05:50:45	05:52:45	07:04:36	4:01	1:25	85.22%
Guyana	Linden	05:42:24 (sunrise)	05:48:33	05:50:54	05:53:14	07:04:20	4:41	1:22	85.18%
Suriname	Nieuw Nickerie	06:37:17 (sunrise)	06:48:36	06:51:03	06:53:29	08:05:20	4:53	1:28	85.24%
Suriname	Paramaribo	06:29:59 (sunrise)	06:48:50	06:51:21	06:53:52	08:06:53	5:02	1:37	85.33%
French Guiana	Saint-Laurent-du-Maroni	06:25:27 (sunrise)	06:49:06	06:51:50	06:54:33	08:08:14	5:27	1:43	85.39%
French Guiana	Kourou	06:19:55 (sunrise)	06:49:36	06:52:26	06:55:16	08:09:54	5:40	1:50	85.46%
French Guiana	Cayenne	06:18:40 (sunrise)	06:49:54	06:52:44	06:55:35	08:10:30	5:41	1:52	85.48%

=== Places experiencing partial eclipse ===
Solar Eclipse of September 22, 2006 (Local Times)
Country or territory	City or place	Start of partial eclipse	Maximum eclipse	End of partial eclipse	Duration of eclipse (hr:min)	Maximum coverage
Barbados	Bridgetown	05:47:34 (sunrise)	05:49:46	06:55:18	1:08	65.18%
Guyana	Georgetown	05:41:57 (sunrise)	05:50:16	07:03:31	1:22	85.08%
French Guiana	Maripasoula	06:25:30 (sunrise)	06:53:36	08:10:28	1:45	85.38%
Saint Lucia	Castries	05:53:01 (sunrise)	05:55:13	06:53:36	1:01	58.66%
Martinique	Fort-de-France	05:53:20 (sunrise)	05:55:32	06:52:49	0:59	56.45%
Saint Vincent and the Grenadines	Kingstown	05:54:00 (sunrise)	05:56:11	06:54:32	1:01	60.61%
Dominica	Roseau	05:54:34 (sunrise)	05:56:46	06:51:50	0:57	53.19%
Trinidad and Tobago	Port of Spain	05:55:13 (sunrise)	05:57:23	06:57:20	1:02	67.37%
Guadeloupe	Basse-Terre	05:55:55 (sunrise)	05:58:08	06:50:50	0:55	49.81%
Grenada	St. George's	05:56:09 (sunrise)	05:58:19	06:55:38	0:59	61.96%
Antigua and Barbuda	St. John's	05:56:19 (sunrise)	05:58:33	06:49:20	0:53	45.99%
Cape Verde	Praia	07:47:23	09:00:33	10:23:28	2:36	40.14%
Brazil	Belém	06:03:22 (sunrise)	07:01:35	08:23:15	2:20	73.56%
Saint Kitts and Nevis	Basseterre	05:59:49 (sunrise)	06:02:03	06:48:51	0:49	42.31%
Venezuela	Ciudad Guayana	06:00:06 (sunrise)	06:02:15	06:59:21	0:59	67.24%
Brazil	Fortaleza	05:55:24	07:12:46	08:43:38	2:48	74.19%
Guinea-Bissau	Bissau	08:56:24	10:13:30	11:39:52	2:43	36.59%
Guinea	Conakry	08:59:43	10:19:53	11:49:29	2:50	39.08%
Venezuela	Caracas	06:16:45 (sunrise)	06:20:21	06:55:37	0:39	35.43%
Sierra Leone	Freetown	09:00:52	10:22:23	11:53:28	2:53	40.64%
Brazil	Brasília	06:18:31	07:25:20	08:42:09	2:24	38.23%
Liberia	Monrovia	09:06:11	10:30:04	12:03:07	2:57	40.92%
Brazil	Rio de Janeiro	06:38:22	07:45:33	09:01:44	2:23	28.76%
Saint Helena, Ascension and Tristan da Cunha	Jamestown	09:51:27	11:34:19	13:21:40	3:30	75.10%
South Africa	Cape Town	13:20:58	14:56:47	16:24:20	3:03	61.47%
South Africa	Johannesburg	13:44:04	15:03:43	16:15:24	2:31	26.04%
Lesotho	Maseru	13:41:53	15:06:20	16:22:09	2:40	35.00%
French Southern and Antarctic Lands	Port-aux-Français	17:22:53	18:12:33	18:15:49 (sunset)	0:53	56.87%
South Africa	Marion Island	15:00:30	16:23:30	17:38:46	2:38	79.31%
French Southern and Antarctic Lands	Île de la Possession	17:15:18	18:31:05	19:29:36 (sunset)	2:14	70.83%

== Eclipse details ==
Shown below are two tables displaying details about this particular solar eclipse. The first table outlines times at which the Moon's penumbra or umbra attains the specific parameter, and the second table describes various other parameters pertaining to this eclipse.

September 22, 2006 Solar Eclipse Times
Event	Time (UTC)
First Penumbral External Contact	2006 September 22 at 08:41:01.9 UTC
First Umbral External Contact	2006 September 22 at 09:49:37.0 UTC
First Central Line	2006 September 22 at 09:52:37.2 UTC
First Umbral Internal Contact	2006 September 22 at 09:55:38.2 UTC
First Penumbral Internal Contact	2006 September 22 at 11:24:51.6 UTC
Greatest Duration	2006 September 22 at 11:40:28.6 UTC
Greatest Eclipse	2006 September 22 at 11:41:16.4 UTC
Ecliptic Conjunction	2006 September 22 at 11:46:08.5 UTC
Last Penumbral Internal Contact	2006 September 22 at 11:57:02.3 UTC
Equatorial Conjunction	2006 September 22 at 12:08:15.8 UTC
Last Umbral Internal Contact	2006 September 22 at 13:26:37.6 UTC
Last Central Line	2006 September 22 at 13:29:39.0 UTC
Last Umbral External Contact	2006 September 22 at 13:32:39.5 UTC
Last Penumbral External Contact	2006 September 22 at 14:41:20.1 UTC

September 22, 2006 Solar Eclipse Parameters
Parameter	Value
Eclipse Magnitude	0.93517
Eclipse Obscuration	0.87455
Gamma	−0.40624
Sun Right Ascension	11h57m32.9s
Sun Declination	+00°15'56.9"
Sun Semi-Diameter	15'56.1"
Sun Equatorial Horizontal Parallax	08.8"
Moon Right Ascension	11h56m50.2s
Moon Declination	-00°03'07.8"
Moon Semi-Diameter	14'41.9"
Moon Equatorial Horizontal Parallax	0°53'56.7"
ΔT	65.0 s

== Eclipse season ==
This eclipse is part of an eclipse season, a period, roughly every six months, when eclipses occur. Only two (or occasionally three) eclipse seasons occur each year, and each season lasts about 35 days and repeats just short of six months (173 days) later; thus two full eclipse seasons always occur each year. Either two or three eclipses happen each eclipse season. In the sequence below, each eclipse is separated by a fortnight.

Eclipse season of September 2006
September 7 Ascending node (full moon)	September 22 Descending node (new moon)
Partial lunar eclipse Lunar Saros 118	Annular solar eclipse Solar Saros 144

== Related eclipses ==
=== Eclipses in 2006 ===
- A penumbral lunar eclipse on March 14.
- A total solar eclipse on March 29.
- A partial lunar eclipse on September 7.
- An annular solar eclipse on September 22.

=== Metonic ===
- Preceded by: Solar eclipse of December 4, 2002
- Followed by: Solar eclipse of July 11, 2010

=== Tzolkinex ===
- Preceded by: Solar eclipse of August 11, 1999
- Followed by: Solar eclipse of November 3, 2013

=== Half-Saros ===
- Preceded by: Lunar eclipse of September 16, 1997
- Followed by: Lunar eclipse of September 28, 2015

=== Tritos ===
- Preceded by: Solar eclipse of October 24, 1995
- Followed by: Solar eclipse of August 21, 2017

=== Solar Saros 144 ===
- Preceded by: Solar eclipse of September 11, 1988
- Followed by: Solar eclipse of October 2, 2024

=== Inex ===
- Preceded by: Solar eclipse of October 12, 1977
- Followed by: Solar eclipse of September 2, 2035

=== Triad ===
- Preceded by: Solar eclipse of November 22, 1919
- Followed by: Solar eclipse of July 23, 2093

=== Solar eclipses of 2004–2007 ===
This eclipse is a member of a semester series. An eclipse in a semester series of solar eclipses repeats approximately every 177 days and 4 hours (a semester) at alternating nodes of the Moon's orbit.

Solar eclipse series sets from 2004 to 2007
Ascending node			Descending node		
Saros	Map	Gamma	Saros	Map	Gamma
119	April 19, 2004 Partial	−1.13345	124	October 14, 2004 Partial	1.03481
129 Partial in Naiguatá, Venezuela	April 8, 2005 Hybrid	−0.34733	134 Annularity in Madrid, Spain	October 3, 2005 Annular	0.33058
139 Totality in Side, Turkey	March 29, 2006 Total	0.38433	144 Partial in São Paulo, Brazil	September 22, 2006 Annular	−0.40624
149 Partial in Jaipur, India	March 19, 2007 Partial	1.07277	154 Partial in Córdoba, Argentina	September 11, 2007 Partial	−1.12552

=== Saros 144 ===
This eclipse is a part of Saros series 144, repeating every 18 years, 11 days, and containing 70 events. The series started with a partial solar eclipse on April 11, 1736. It contains annular eclipses from July 7, 1880 through August 27, 2565. There are no hybrid or total eclipses in this set. The series ends at member 70 as a partial eclipse on May 5, 2980. Its eclipses are tabulated in three columns; every third eclipse in the same column is one exeligmos apart, so they all cast shadows over approximately the same parts of the Earth.

The longest duration of annularity will be produced by member 51 at 9 minutes, 52 seconds on December 29, 2168. All eclipses in this series occur at the Moon’s descending node of orbit.

Series members 5–26 occur between 1801 and 2200:
5	6	7
May 25, 1808	June 5, 1826	June 16, 1844
8	9	10
June 27, 1862	July 7, 1880	July 18, 1898
11	12	13
July 30, 1916	August 10, 1934	August 20, 1952
14	15	16
August 31, 1970	September 11, 1988	September 22, 2006
17	18	19
October 2, 2024	October 14, 2042	October 24, 2060
20	21	22
November 4, 2078	November 15, 2096	November 27, 2114
23	24	25
December 7, 2132	December 19, 2150	December 29, 2168
26
January 9, 2187

=== Metonic series ===
The metonic series repeats eclipses every 19 years (6939.69 days), lasting about 5 cycles. Eclipses occur in nearly the same calendar date. In addition, the octon subseries repeats 1/5 of that or every 3.8 years (1387.94 days). All eclipses in this table occur at the Moon's descending node.

21 eclipse events between July 11, 1953 and July 11, 2029
July 10–11	April 29–30	February 15–16	December 4	September 21–23
116	118	120	122	124
July 11, 1953	April 30, 1957	February 15, 1961	December 4, 1964	September 22, 1968
126	128	130	132	134
July 10, 1972	April 29, 1976	February 16, 1980	December 4, 1983	September 23, 1987
136	138	140	142	144
July 11, 1991	April 29, 1995	February 16, 1999	December 4, 2002	September 22, 2006
146	148	150	152	154
July 11, 2010	April 29, 2014	February 15, 2018	December 4, 2021	September 21, 2025
156
July 11, 2029

=== Tritos series ===
This eclipse is a part of a tritos cycle, repeating at alternating nodes every 135 synodic months (≈ 3986.63 days, or 11 years minus 1 month). Their appearance and longitude are irregular due to a lack of synchronization with the anomalistic month (period of perigee), but groupings of 3 tritos cycles (≈ 33 years minus 3 months) come close (≈ 434.044 anomalistic months), so eclipses are similar in these groupings.

Series members between 1801 and 2200
April 4, 1810 (Saros 126)	March 4, 1821 (Saros 127)	February 1, 1832 (Saros 128)	December 31, 1842 (Saros 129)	November 30, 1853 (Saros 130)
October 30, 1864 (Saros 131)	September 29, 1875 (Saros 132)	August 29, 1886 (Saros 133)	July 29, 1897 (Saros 134)	June 28, 1908 (Saros 135)
May 29, 1919 (Saros 136)	April 28, 1930 (Saros 137)	March 27, 1941 (Saros 138)	February 25, 1952 (Saros 139)	January 25, 1963 (Saros 140)
December 24, 1973 (Saros 141)	November 22, 1984 (Saros 142)	October 24, 1995 (Saros 143)	September 22, 2006 (Saros 144)	August 21, 2017 (Saros 145)
July 22, 2028 (Saros 146)	June 21, 2039 (Saros 147)	May 20, 2050 (Saros 148)	April 20, 2061 (Saros 149)	March 19, 2072 (Saros 150)
February 16, 2083 (Saros 151)	January 16, 2094 (Saros 152)	December 17, 2104 (Saros 153)	November 16, 2115 (Saros 154)	October 16, 2126 (Saros 155)
September 15, 2137 (Saros 156)	August 14, 2148 (Saros 157)	July 15, 2159 (Saros 158)	June 14, 2170 (Saros 159)	May 13, 2181 (Saros 160)
April 12, 2192 (Saros 161)

=== Inex series ===
This eclipse is a part of the long period inex cycle, repeating at alternating nodes, every 358 synodic months (≈ 10,571.95 days, or 29 years minus 20 days). Their appearance and longitude are irregular due to a lack of synchronization with the anomalistic month (period of perigee). However, groupings of 3 inex cycles (≈ 87 years minus 2 months) comes close (≈ 1,151.02 anomalistic months), so eclipses are similar in these groupings.

Series members between 1801 and 2200
February 11, 1804 (Saros 137)	January 20, 1833 (Saros 138)	December 31, 1861 (Saros 139)
December 12, 1890 (Saros 140)	November 22, 1919 (Saros 141)	November 1, 1948 (Saros 142)
October 12, 1977 (Saros 143)	September 22, 2006 (Saros 144)	September 2, 2035 (Saros 145)
August 12, 2064 (Saros 146)	July 23, 2093 (Saros 147)	July 4, 2122 (Saros 148)
June 14, 2151 (Saros 149)	May 24, 2180 (Saros 150)	
