= Solar eclipse of April 29, 2014 =

21st-century annular solar eclipse

- Annular eclipse
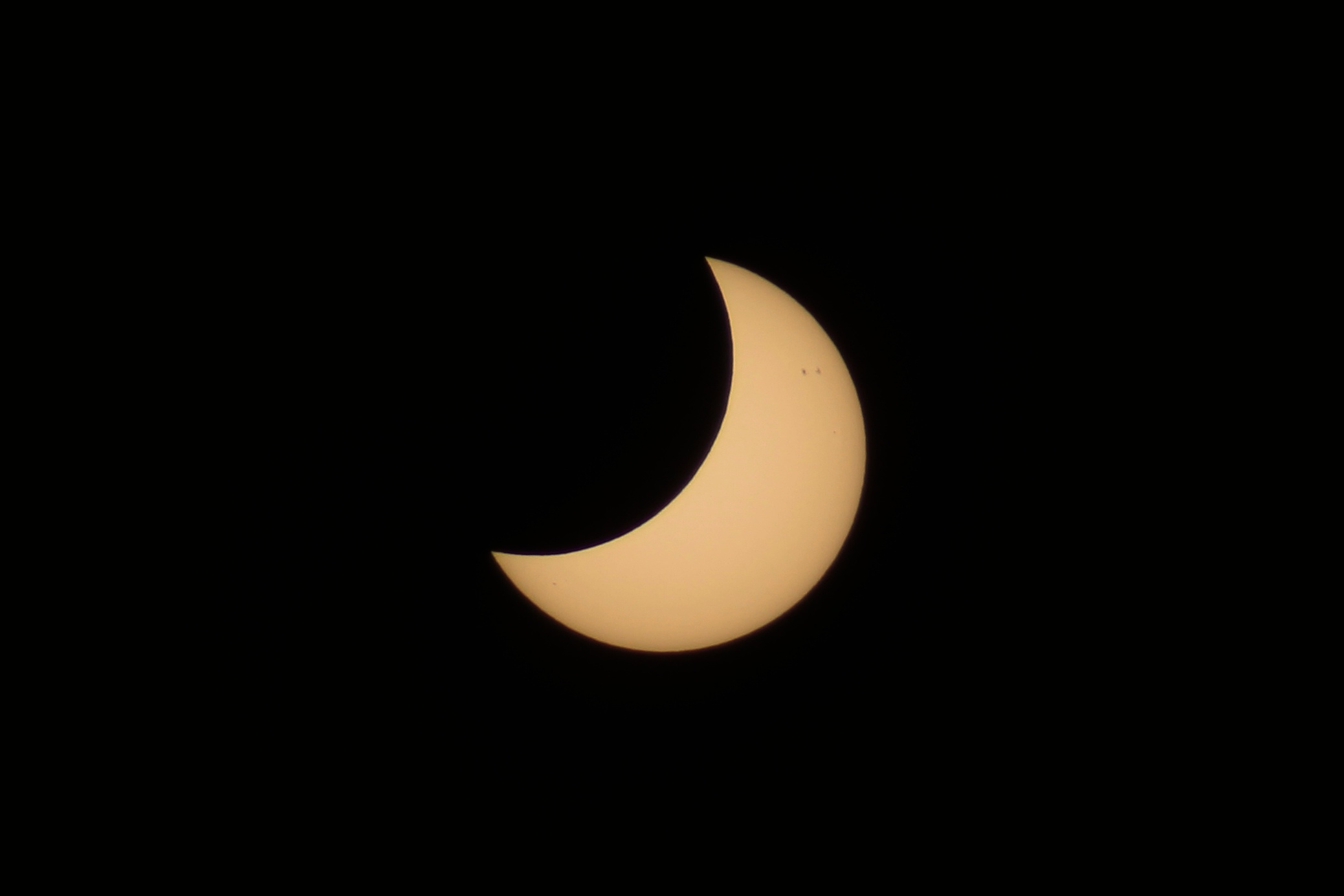
- Partial from Adelaide, Australia

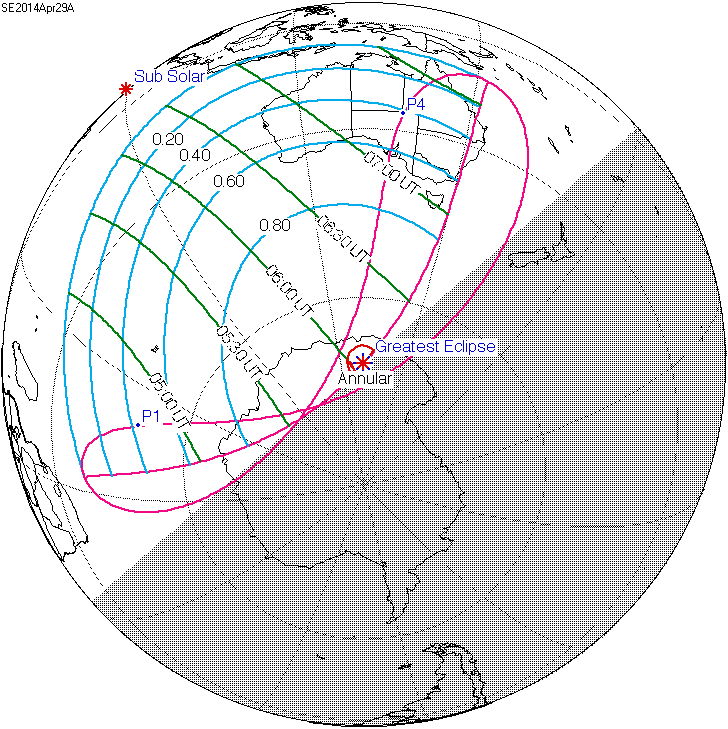
- Map
- Gamma: −1.00001
- Magnitude: 0.9868

Maximum eclipse
- Duration: -
- Coordinates: 70.6°S 131.3°E
- Max. width of band: km

Times (UTC)
- (P1) Partial begin: 3:52:38
- (U1) Total begin: 5:47:50
- Greatest eclipse: 6:04:33
- (U4) Total end: 6:09:20
- (P4) Partial end: 8:14:28

References
- Saros: 148 (21 of 75)
- Catalog # (SE5000): 9539

An annular solar eclipse occurred at the Moon's descending node of orbit on Tuesday, April 29, 2014, with a magnitude of 0.9868. A solar eclipse occurs when the Moon passes between Earth and the Sun, thereby totally or partly obscuring the image of the Sun for a viewer on Earth. An annular solar eclipse occurs when the Moon's apparent diameter is smaller than the Sun's, blocking most of the Sun's light and causing the Sun to look like an annulus (ring). An annular eclipse appears as a partial eclipse over a region of the Earth thousands of kilometres wide. The Moon's apparent diameter was near the average diameter because it occurred 6.2 days after perigee (on April 23, 2014, at 1:20 UTC) and 7.2 days before apogee (on May 6, 2014, at 11:20 UTC).

This eclipse's gamma value was closer to 1 than any other eclipse from 2000 B.C. to 3000 A.D. This means the center of the Moon's shadow passed almost exactly at the surface of the Earth, barely missing the Antarctic continent by a few kilometers, but an annular eclipse was visible from a small part of Antarctica, and a partial eclipse was visible from parts of Antarctica and Australia.

== Images ==
Animation of eclipse path

== Gallery ==
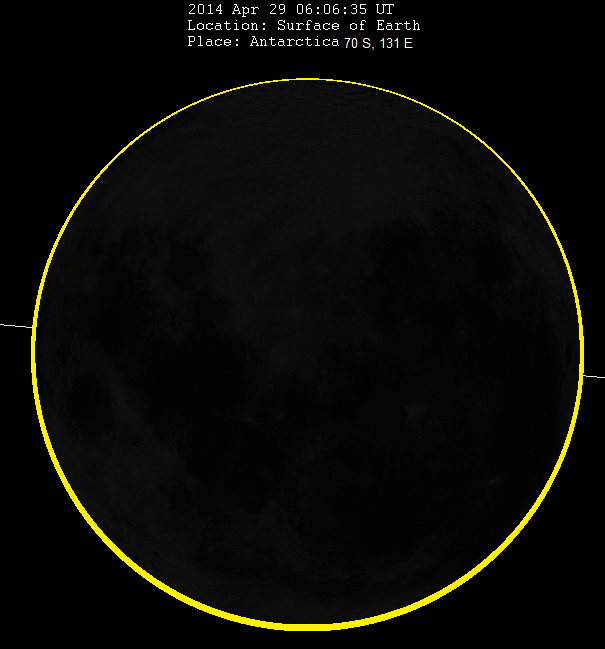
Simulated annularity from Victoria Land

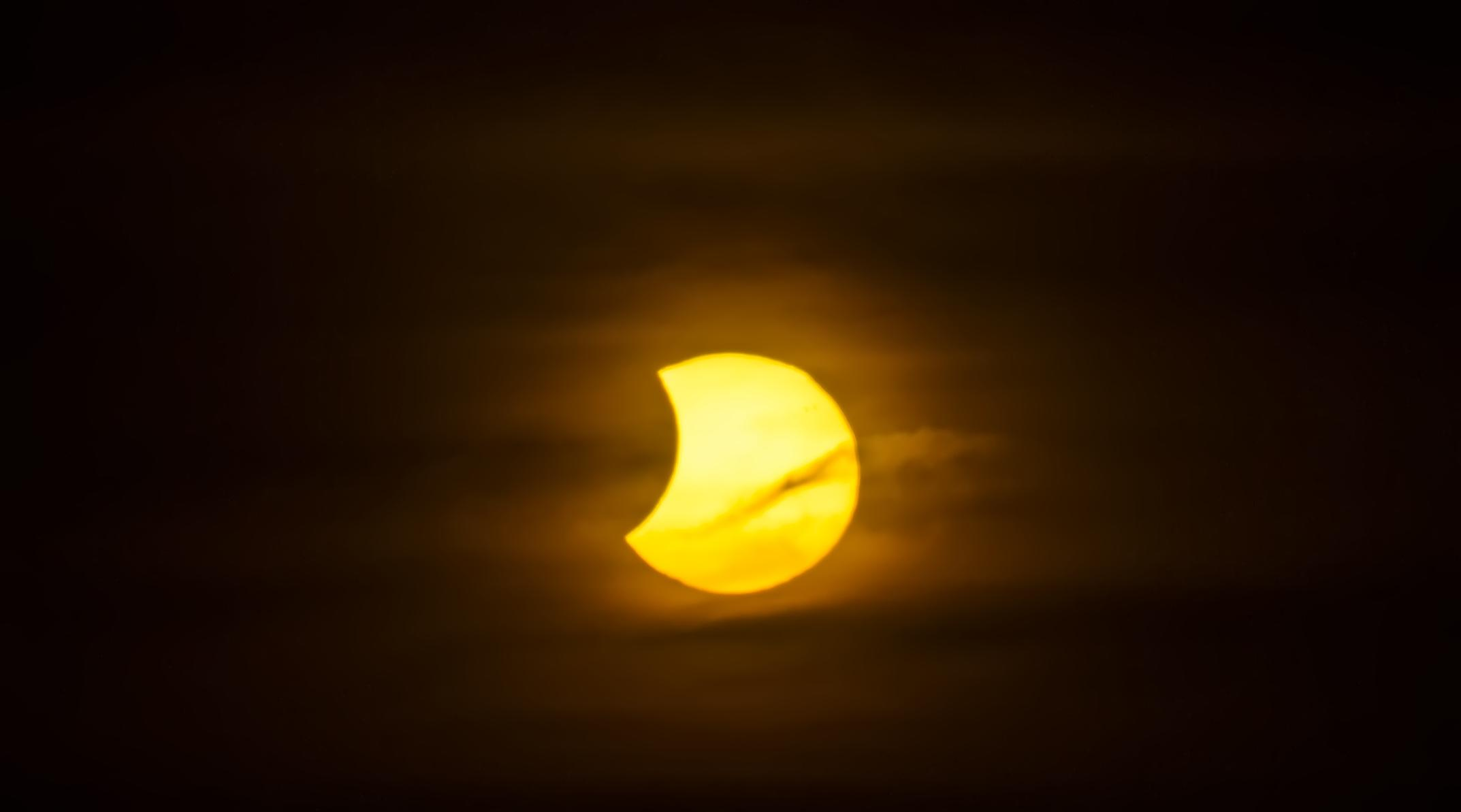
Partial from Scarborough, Queensland, 7:03 UTC

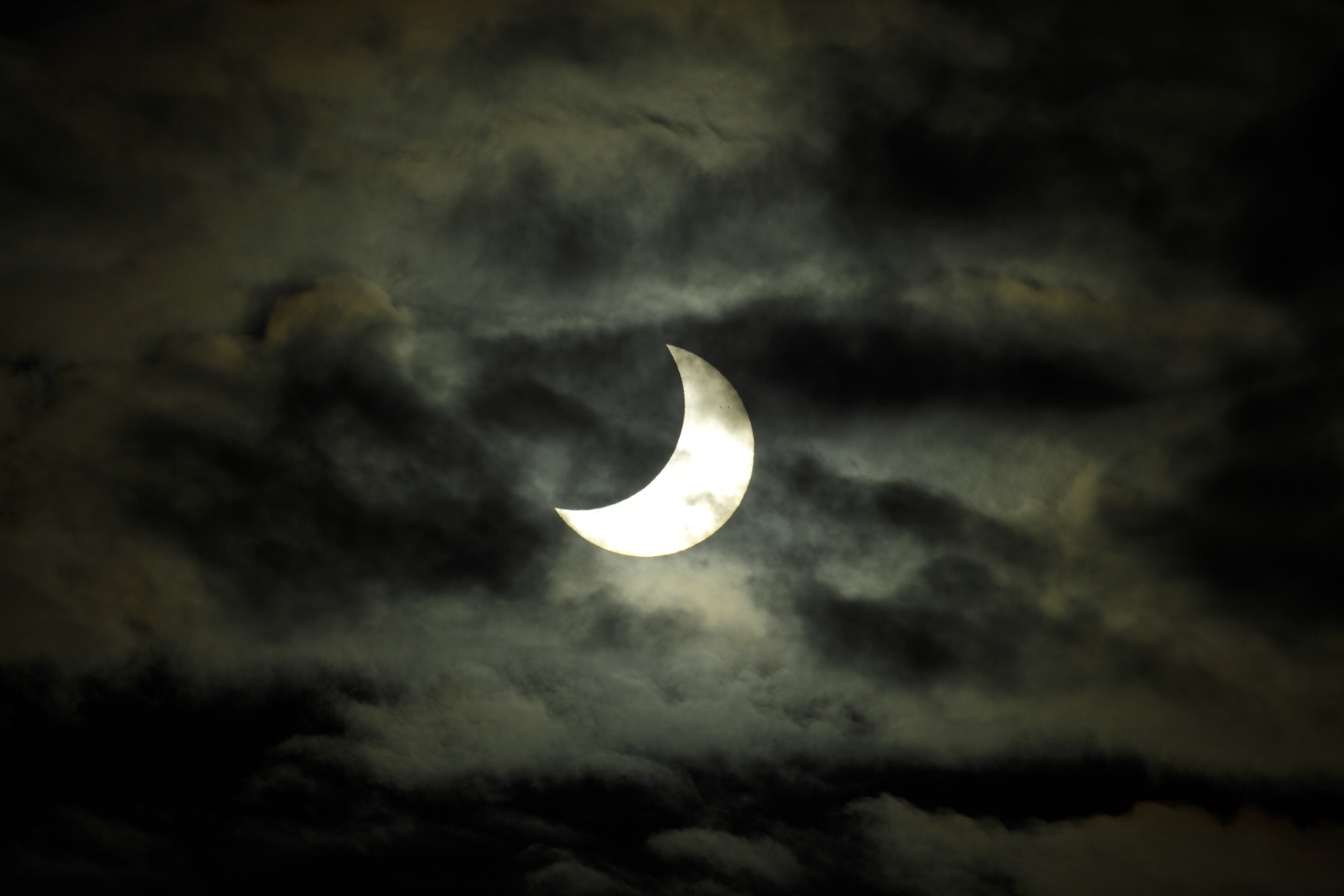
Partial from Lake Wendouree, Victoria, 7:04 UTC

== Eclipse timing ==
=== Places experiencing partial eclipse ===
Solar Eclipse of April 29, 2014 (Local Times)
Country or territory	City or place	Start of partial eclipse	Maximum eclipse	End of partial eclipse	Duration of eclipse (hr:min)	Maximum coverage
South Africa	Marion Island	07:24:32 (sunrise)	07:39:21	08:25:06	1:01	14.46%
French Southern and Antarctic Lands	Île de la Possession	08:53:48	09:47:08	10:44:35	1:51	23.19%
French Southern and Antarctic Lands	Port-aux-Français	08:57:47	10:07:42	11:22:40	2:25	47.03%
French Southern and Antarctic Lands	Île Amsterdam	09:07:48	10:17:45	11:32:42	2:25	30.05%
Antarctica	Casey Station	12:38:55	13:53:40	15:07:03	2:28	94.85%
Cocos (Keeling) Islands	Bantam	12:26:22	12:56:05	13:25:18	0:59	1.00%
Australia	Perth	13:16:37	14:42:08	15:59:10	2:43	49.25%
Australia	Lord Howe Island	16:56:01	17:16:03	17:18:39 (sunset)	0:23	12.19%
Christmas Island	Flying Fish Cove	13:14:40	13:47:58	14:19:57	1:05	1.60%
Australia	Hobart	15:50:32	17:00:16	17:17:25 (sunset)	1:27	64.44%
Australia	Eucla	14:30:01	15:47:03	16:55:09	2:25	47.46%
Indonesia	Malang	13:51:06	14:04:00	14:16:38	0:26	0.11%
Australia	Melbourne	15:57:58	17:06:52	17:35:43 (sunset)	1:38	54.61%
Australia	Adelaide	15:25:09	16:36:54	17:35:40 (sunset)	2:11	51.26%
Indonesia	Denpasar	14:45:29	15:07:54	15:29:29	0:44	0.62%
Indonesia	Singaraja	14:52:20	15:08:08	15:23:31	0:31	0.21%
Indonesia	Mataram	14:47:58	15:09:26	15:30:06	0:42	0.55%
Australia	Canberra	16:08:16	17:12:24	17:23:02 (sunset)	1:15	46.17%
Indonesia	Raba	14:54:14	15:13:30	15:32:06	0:38	0.43%
Australia	Sydney	16:13:38	17:14:11	17:16:51 (sunset)	1:03	41.39%
Australia	Brisbane	16:30:58	17:14:56	17:18:20 (sunset)	0:47	23.42%
Australia	Alice Springs	15:44:14	16:47:26	17:43:47	2:00	26.18%
Indonesia	Kupang	14:49:43	15:19:06	15:46:52	0:57	1.77%
Timor-Leste	Suai	16:00:53	16:21:50	16:41:55	0:41	0.68%
Australia	Tennant Creek	15:57:10	16:52:03	17:41:31	1:44	16.54%
Timor-Leste	Same	16:05:16	16:22:31	16:39:11	0:34	0.38%
Timor-Leste	Dili	16:11:25	16:22:46	16:33:50	0:22	0.11%
Timor-Leste	Baucau	16:16:43	16:23:50	16:30:50	0:14	0.03%
Australia	Darwin	16:20:45	16:55:25	17:27:48	1:07	3.64%
Australia	Cairns	16:56:08	17:31:26	17:59:50 (sunset)	1:04	5.91%

== Eclipse details ==
Shown below are two tables displaying details about this particular solar eclipse. The first table outlines times at which the Moon's penumbra or umbra attains the specific parameter, and the second table describes various other parameters pertaining to this eclipse.

April 29, 2014 Solar Eclipse Times
Event	Time (UTC)
First Penumbral External Contact	2014 April 29 at 03:53:46.0 UTC
Equatorial Conjunction	2014 April 29 at 05:38:58.2 UTC
First Umbral External Contact	2014 April 29 at 05:58:45.6 UTC
Greatest Eclipse	2014 April 29 at 06:04:32.9 UTC
Last Umbral Internal Contact	2014 April 29 at 06:10:41.3 UTC
Ecliptic Conjunction	2014 April 29 at 06:15:28.3 UTC
Last Penumbral External Contact	2014 April 29 at 08:15:37.1 UTC

April 29, 2014 Solar Eclipse Parameters
Parameter	Value
Eclipse Magnitude	0.98679
Eclipse Obscuration	-
Gamma	-0.99996
Sun Right Ascension	02h25m52.9s
Sun Declination	+14°26'54.2"
Sun Semi-Diameter	15'52.9"
Sun Equatorial Horizontal Parallax	08.7"
Moon Right Ascension	02h26m46.0s
Moon Declination	+13°31'06.8"
Moon Semi-Diameter	15'38.4"
Moon Equatorial Horizontal Parallax	0°57'24.1"
ΔT	67.3 s

== Eclipse season ==
This eclipse is part of an eclipse season, a period, roughly every six months, when eclipses occur. Only two (or occasionally three) eclipse seasons occur each year, and each season lasts about 35 days and repeats just short of six months (173 days) later; thus two full eclipse seasons always occur each year. Either two or three eclipses happen each eclipse season. In the sequence below, each eclipse is separated by a fortnight.

Eclipse season of April 2014
April 15 Ascending node (full moon)	April 29 Descending node (new moon)
Total lunar eclipse Lunar Saros 122	Annular solar eclipse Solar Saros 148

== Related eclipses ==
=== Eclipses in 2014 ===
- A total lunar eclipse on April 15.
- A non-central annular solar eclipse on April 29.
- A total lunar eclipse on October 8.
- A partial solar eclipse on October 23.

=== Metonic ===
- Preceded by: Solar eclipse of July 11, 2010
- Followed by: Solar eclipse of February 15, 2018

=== Tzolkinex ===
- Preceded by: Solar eclipse of March 19, 2007
- Followed by: Solar eclipse of June 10, 2021

=== Half-Saros ===
- Preceded by: Lunar eclipse of April 24, 2005
- Followed by: Lunar eclipse of May 5, 2023

=== Tritos ===
- Preceded by: Solar eclipse of May 31, 2003
- Followed by: Solar eclipse of March 29, 2025

=== Solar Saros 148 ===
- Preceded by: Solar eclipse of April 17, 1996
- Followed by: Solar eclipse of May 9, 2032

=== Inex ===
- Preceded by: Solar eclipse of May 19, 1985
- Followed by: Solar eclipse of April 9, 2043

=== Triad ===
- Preceded by: Solar eclipse of June 29, 1927
- Followed by: Solar eclipse of February 28, 2101

=== Solar eclipses of 2011–2014 ===
This eclipse is a member of a semester series. An eclipse in a semester series of solar eclipses repeats approximately every 177 days and 4 hours (a semester) at alternating nodes of the Moon's orbit.

The partial solar eclipses on January 4, 2011 and July 1, 2011 occur in the previous lunar year eclipse set.

Solar eclipse series sets from 2011 to 2014
Descending node			Ascending node		
Saros	Map	Gamma	Saros	Map	Gamma
118 Partial in Tromsø, Norway	June 1, 2011 Partial	1.21300	123 Hinode XRT footage	November 25, 2011 Partial	−1.05359
128 Annularity in Red Bluff, CA, USA	May 20, 2012 Annular	0.48279	133 Totality in Mount Carbine, Queensland, Australia	November 13, 2012 Total	−0.37189
138 Annularity in Churchills Head, Australia	May 10, 2013 Annular	−0.26937	143 Partial in Libreville, Gabon	November 3, 2013 Hybrid	0.32715
148 Partial in Adelaide, Australia	April 29, 2014 Annular (non-central)	−0.99996	153 Partial in Minneapolis, MN, USA	October 23, 2014 Partial	1.09078

=== Saros 148 ===
This eclipse is a part of Saros series 148, repeating every 18 years, 11 days, and containing 75 events. The series started with a partial solar eclipse on September 21, 1653. It contains annular eclipses on April 29, 2014 and May 9, 2032; a hybrid eclipse on May 20, 2050; and total eclipses from May 31, 2068 through August 3, 2771. The series ends at member 75 as a partial eclipse on December 12, 2987. Its eclipses are tabulated in three columns; every third eclipse in the same column is one exeligmos apart, so they all cast shadows over approximately the same parts of the Earth.

The longest duration of annularity will be produced by member 22 at 22 seconds (by default) on May 9, 2032, and the longest duration of totality will be produced by member 54 at 5 minutes, 23 seconds on April 26, 2609. All eclipses in this series occur at the Moon’s descending node of orbit.

Series members 10–31 occur between 1801 and 2200:
10	11	12
December 30, 1815	January 9, 1834	January 21, 1852
13	14	15
January 31, 1870	February 11, 1888	February 23, 1906
16	17	18
March 5, 1924	March 16, 1942	March 27, 1960
19	20	21
April 7, 1978	April 17, 1996	April 29, 2014
22	23	24
May 9, 2032	May 20, 2050	May 31, 2068
25	26	27
June 11, 2086	June 22, 2104	July 4, 2122
28	29	30
July 14, 2140	July 25, 2158	August 4, 2176
31
August 16, 2194

=== Metonic series ===
The metonic series repeats eclipses every 19 years (6939.69 days), lasting about 5 cycles. Eclipses occur in nearly the same calendar date. In addition, the octon subseries repeats 1/5 of that or every 3.8 years (1387.94 days). All eclipses in this table occur at the Moon's descending node.

21 eclipse events between July 11, 1953 and July 11, 2029
July 10–11	April 29–30	February 15–16	December 4	September 21–23
116	118	120	122	124
July 11, 1953	April 30, 1957	February 15, 1961	December 4, 1964	September 22, 1968
126	128	130	132	134
July 10, 1972	April 29, 1976	February 16, 1980	December 4, 1983	September 23, 1987
136	138	140	142	144
July 11, 1991	April 29, 1995	February 16, 1999	December 4, 2002	September 22, 2006
146	148	150	152	154
July 11, 2010	April 29, 2014	February 15, 2018	December 4, 2021	September 21, 2025
156
July 11, 2029

=== Tritos series ===
This eclipse is a part of a tritos cycle, repeating at alternating nodes every 135 synodic months (≈ 3986.63 days, or 11 years minus 1 month). Their appearance and longitude are irregular due to a lack of synchronization with the anomalistic month (period of perigee), but groupings of 3 tritos cycles (≈ 33 years minus 3 months) come close (≈ 434.044 anomalistic months), so eclipses are similar in these groupings.

The partial solar eclipses on December 18, 2188 (part of Saros 164) and November 18, 2199 (part of Saros 165) are also a part of this series but are not included in the table below.

Series members between 1801 and 2134
December 10, 1806 (Saros 129)	November 9, 1817 (Saros 130)	October 9, 1828 (Saros 131)	September 7, 1839 (Saros 132)	August 7, 1850 (Saros 133)
July 8, 1861 (Saros 134)	June 6, 1872 (Saros 135)	May 6, 1883 (Saros 136)	April 6, 1894 (Saros 137)	March 6, 1905 (Saros 138)
February 3, 1916 (Saros 139)	January 3, 1927 (Saros 140)	December 2, 1937 (Saros 141)	November 1, 1948 (Saros 142)	October 2, 1959 (Saros 143)
August 31, 1970 (Saros 144)	July 31, 1981 (Saros 145)	June 30, 1992 (Saros 146)	May 31, 2003 (Saros 147)	April 29, 2014 (Saros 148)
March 29, 2025 (Saros 149)	February 27, 2036 (Saros 150)	January 26, 2047 (Saros 151)	December 26, 2057 (Saros 152)	November 24, 2068 (Saros 153)
October 24, 2079 (Saros 154)	September 23, 2090 (Saros 155)	August 24, 2101 (Saros 156)	July 23, 2112 (Saros 157)	June 23, 2123 (Saros 158)
May 23, 2134 (Saros 159)

=== Inex series ===
This eclipse is a part of the long period inex cycle, repeating at alternating nodes, every 358 synodic months (≈ 10,571.95 days, or 29 years minus 20 days). Their appearance and longitude are irregular due to a lack of synchronization with the anomalistic month (period of perigee). However, groupings of 3 inex cycles (≈ 87 years minus 2 months) comes close (≈ 1,151.02 anomalistic months), so eclipses are similar in these groupings.

Series members between 1801 and 2200
September 17, 1811 (Saros 141)	August 27, 1840 (Saros 142)	August 7, 1869 (Saros 143)
July 18, 1898 (Saros 144)	June 29, 1927 (Saros 145)	June 8, 1956 (Saros 146)
May 19, 1985 (Saros 147)	April 29, 2014 (Saros 148)	April 9, 2043 (Saros 149)
March 19, 2072 (Saros 150)	February 28, 2101 (Saros 151)	February 8, 2130 (Saros 152)
January 19, 2159 (Saros 153)	December 29, 2187 (Saros 154)	
