= Solar eclipse of April 8, 2005 =

Total eclipse

- Hybrid eclipse
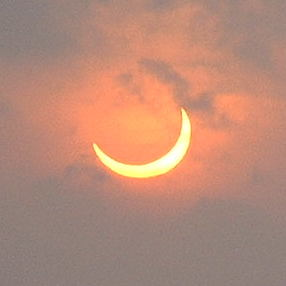
- Partial from Naiguatá, Venezuela

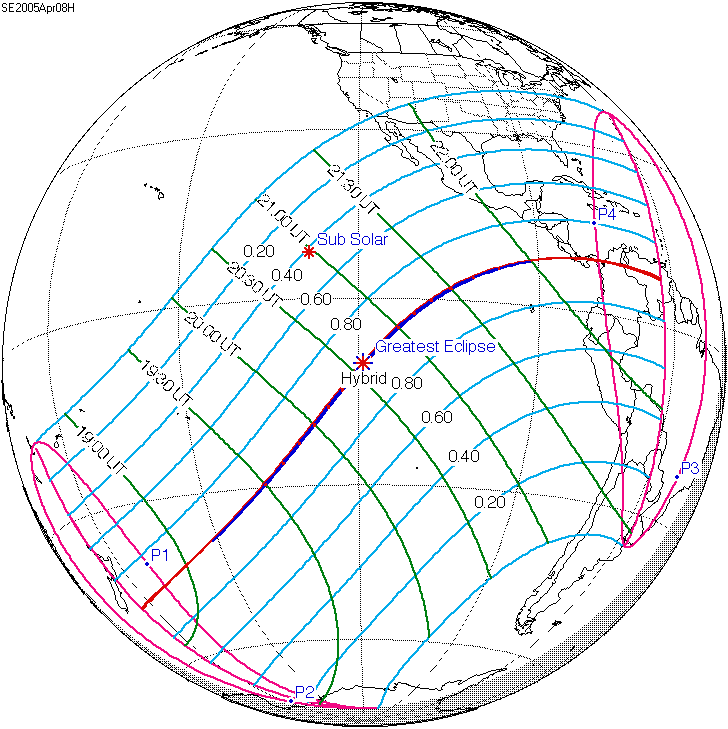
- Map
- Gamma: −0.3473
- Magnitude: 1.0074

Maximum eclipse
- Duration: 42 s (0 min 42 s)
- Coordinates: 10.6°S 119°W
- Max. width of band: 27 km (17 mi)

Times (UTC)
- Greatest eclipse: 20:36:51

References
- Saros: 129 (51 of 80)
- Catalog # (SE5000): 9519

A total solar eclipse occurred at the Moon's ascending node of orbit on Friday, April 8, 2005, with a magnitude of 1.0074. It was a hybrid event, a narrow total eclipse, and beginning and ending as an annular eclipse. A solar eclipse occurs when the Moon passes between Earth and the Sun, thereby totally or partly obscuring the image of the Sun for a viewer on Earth. A hybrid solar eclipse is a rare type of solar eclipse that changes its appearance from annular to total and back as the Moon's shadow moves across the Earth's surface. Totality occurs between the annularity paths across the surface of the Earth, with the partial solar eclipse visible over a surrounding region thousands of kilometres wide. Occurring about 4.3 days after perigee (on April 4, 2005, at 12:10 UTC), the Moon's apparent diameter was larger.

It was visible within a narrow corridor in the Pacific Ocean. The path of the eclipse started south of New Zealand and crossed the Pacific Ocean in a diagonal path and ended in the extreme northwestern part of South America. The total solar eclipse was not visible on any land, but the annular solar eclipse was visible in the southern tip of Puntarenas Province of Costa Rica, Panama, Colombia and Venezuela. A partial eclipse was visible for parts of New Zealand, Oceania, West Antarctica, Mexico, Central America, the Caribbean, and western South America.

A partial eclipse was photographed from Nicaragua; in Bogotá, several hundred schoolchildren watched the eclipse despite cloud cover. In Córdoba, an expedition from Bogotá's National University observed the eclipse.

In Panama, where the eclipse was visible (and nearly total) from nearly the entire country, it was reported that hundreds of people had booked hotels to view it, including astronomers from the United States, Mexico, France, Belgium, Denmark, Iran and Spain. While the totality of the eclipse occurred over the Pacific Ocean, it could be seen from some parts of the southern United States; it was reported that the southernmost parts of Florida had the best viewing conditions (with as much as 50% of the sun occluded), although rainy conditions in part of the region meant the event was partially obscured.

== Observations ==
NASA's Goddard Space Flight Center astrophysicist Fred Espenak and Williams College professor Jay Pasachoff boarded the cruise ship Galapagos Legend and observed the eclipse from the sea west of the Galápagos Islands. The ship first docked at several islands in the Galapagos Islands from April 1 to 3, and then started sailing westward toward the path of totality on April 4. It was cloudy at first on April 8. The ship encountered relatively large wind and waves while sailing south to look for a location with clear sky. The clouds began to disperse from 2 pm, and the Sun could be seen through the thin clouds around 2:40. It cleared up later and during the totality, the weather was excellent and the observation was very successful. After another several days of sailing, the ship arrived at the Galápagos Islands again on April 12 and docked at several islands in the following days.

In addition, cruise ships including the MV Discovery and MS Paul Gauguin carried passengers around the Pitcairn Islands and French Polynesia. A team of NASA's did ground-based observations Penonomé, Coclé, Panama.

== Images ==
Animated path

== Eclipse timing ==
=== Places experiencing annular eclipse ===
Solar Eclipse of April 8, 2005 (Local Times)
| Country or territory | City or place | Start of partial eclipse | Start of annular eclipse | Maximum eclipse | End of annular eclipse | End of partial eclipse | Duration of annularity (min:s) | Duration of eclipse (hr:min) | Maximum coverage |
|---|---|---|---|---|---|---|---|---|---|
| Panama | David | 15:53:09 | 17:10:18 | 17:10:22 | 17:10:25 | 18:17:52 | 0:07 | 2:25 | 99.55% |

=== Places experiencing partial eclipse ===
Solar Eclipse of April 8, 2005 (Local Times)
| Country or territory | City or place | Start of partial eclipse | Maximum eclipse | End of partial eclipse | Duration of eclipse (hr:min) | Maximum coverage |
|---|---|---|---|---|---|---|
| New Zealand | Auckland (Note: The times listed for this location occur on April 9, 2005, local time.) | 06:40:59 (sunrise) | 06:49:33 | 07:49:35 | 1:09 | 56.96% |
| New Zealand | Wellington | 06:44:32 (sunrise) | 06:50:39 | 07:52:56 | 1:08 | 73.66% |
| New Zealand | Chatham Islands | 06:57:12 (sunrise) | 07:38:09 | 08:44:30 | 1:47 | 89.67% |
| French Polynesia | Gambier Islands | 09:18:22 | 10:41:56 | 12:11:51 | 2:53 | 87.60% |
| Pitcairn Islands | Adamstown | 10:21:42 | 11:47:00 | 13:17:42 | 2:56 | 95.34% |
| Guyana | Georgetown | 17:15:16 | 17:59:08 | 18:01:20 (sunset) | 0:46 | 60.72% |
| Mexico | Mexico City | 15:46:40 | 17:02:24 | 18:10:45 | 2:24 | 48.83% |
| Ecuador | Quito | 15:50:55 | 17:05:09 | 18:10:05 | 2:19 | 68.16% |
| Guatemala | Guatemala City | 14:49:18 | 16:07:56 | 17:17:23 | 2:28 | 73.06% |
| Barbados | Bridgetown | 17:19:16 | 18:08:24 | 18:10:38 (sunset) | 0:51 | 65.04% |
| El Salvador | San Salvador | 14:49:51 | 16:08:32 | 17:17:52 | 2:28 | 77.25% |
| Nicaragua | Managua | 14:52:02 | 16:10:04 | 17:18:36 | 2:27 | 84.46% |
| Costa Rica | San José | 14:52:25 | 16:10:13 | 17:18:19 | 2:26 | 93.55% |
| Honduras | Tegucigalpa | 14:53:29 | 16:10:41 | 17:18:44 | 2:25 | 76.73% |
| Belize | Belmopan | 14:56:22 | 16:11:26 | 17:18:06 | 2:22 | 64.17% |
| Colombia | Bogotá | 16:01:01 | 17:12:50 | 18:03:47 (sunset) | 2:03 | 84.89% |
| Panama | Panama City | 15:58:01 | 17:13:00 | 18:18:44 | 2:21 | 97.95% |
| Trinidad and Tobago | Port of Spain | 17:16:23 | 18:13:55 | 18:16:50 (sunset) | 1:00 | 81.81% |
| Saint Lucia | Castries | 17:19:23 | 18:13:55 | 18:16:39 (sunset) | 0:57 | 69.68% |
| Saint Vincent and the Grenadines | Kingstown | 17:18:33 | 18:13:55 | 18:17:06 (sunset) | 0:59 | 72.87% |
| Grenada | St. George's | 17:17:22 | 18:16:19 | 18:18:35 (sunset) | 1:01 | 79.60% |
| Guadeloupe | Basse-Terre | 17:20:49 | 18:18:31 | 18:20:46 (sunset) | 1:00 | 65.79% |
| Venezuela | Caracas | 17:12:48 | 18:19:11 | 18:38:16 (sunset) | 1:25 | 89.88% |
| Jamaica | Kingston | 16:11:44 | 17:19:28 | 18:20:00 | 2:10 | 63.64% |
| Aruba | Oranjestad | 17:12:02 | 18:19:29 | 18:51:59 (sunset) | 1:40 | 61.43% |
| Curaçao | Willemstad | 17:12:35 | 18:19:33 | 18:47:21 (sunset) | 1:35 | 84.50% |
| Caribbean Netherlands | Kralendijk | 17:13:09 | 18:19:42 | 18:44:44 (sunset) | 1:32 | 84.10% |
| Haiti | Port-au-Prince | 17:16:26 | 18:21:09 | 19:04:44 (sunset) | 1:48 | 60.89% |
| Dominican Republic | Santo Domingo | 17:18:13 | 18:21:39 | 18:55:04 (sunset) | 1:37 | 60.58% |
| Puerto Rico | San Juan | 17:20:49 | 18:22:06 | 18:39:47 (sunset) | 1:19 | 59.20% |

== Gallery ==
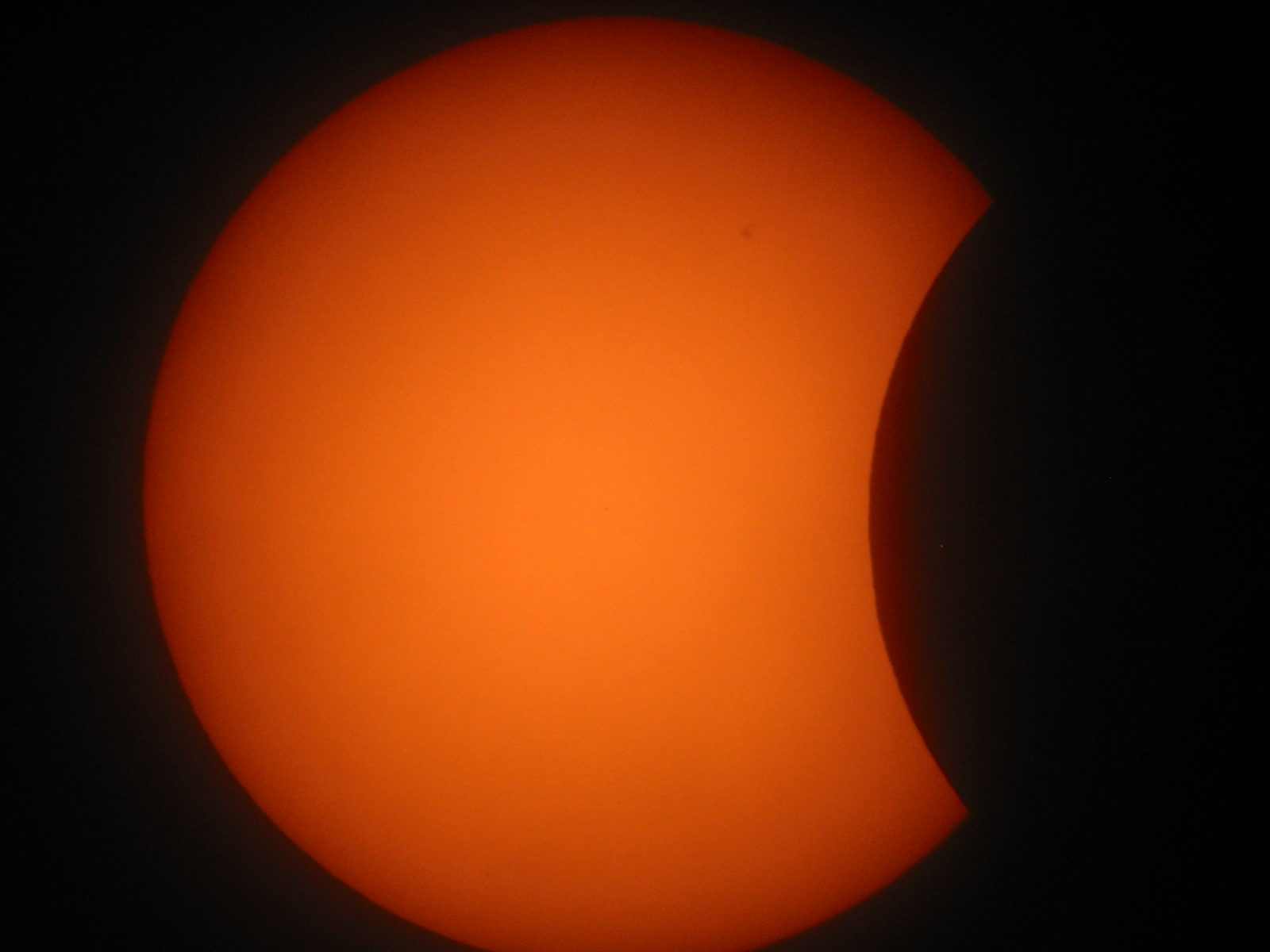
Christchurch (NZ) at sunrise

== Eclipse season ==
This eclipse is part of an eclipse season, a period, roughly every six months, when eclipses occur. Only two (or occasionally three) eclipse seasons occur each year, and each season lasts about 35 days and repeats just short of six months (173 days) later; thus two full eclipse seasons always occur each year. Either two or three eclipses happen each eclipse season. In the sequence below, each eclipse is separated by a fortnight.

Eclipse season of April 2005
| April 8 Ascending node (new moon) | April 24 Descending node (full moon) |
|---|---|
| Hybrid solar eclipse Solar Saros 129 | Penumbral lunar eclipse Lunar Saros 141 |

== Related eclipses ==
=== Eclipses in 2005 ===
- A hybrid solar eclipse on April 8.
- A penumbral lunar eclipse on April 24.
- An annular solar eclipse on October 3.
- A partial lunar eclipse on October 17.

=== Metonic ===
- Preceded by: Solar eclipse of June 21, 2001
- Followed by: Solar eclipse of January 26, 2009

=== Tzolkinex ===
- Preceded by: Solar eclipse of February 26, 1998
- Followed by: Solar eclipse of May 20, 2012

=== Half-Saros ===
- Preceded by: Lunar eclipse of April 4, 1996
- Followed by: Lunar eclipse of April 15, 2014

=== Tritos ===
- Preceded by: Solar eclipse of May 10, 1994
- Followed by: Solar eclipse of March 9, 2016

=== Solar Saros 129 ===
- Preceded by: Solar eclipse of March 29, 1987
- Followed by: Solar eclipse of April 20, 2023

=== Inex ===
- Preceded by: Solar eclipse of April 29, 1976
- Followed by: Solar eclipse of March 20, 2034

=== Triad ===
- Preceded by: Solar eclipse of June 8, 1918
- Followed by: Solar eclipse of February 7, 2092

=== Solar eclipses of 2004–2007 ===
This eclipse is a member of a semester series. An eclipse in a semester series of solar eclipses repeats approximately every 177 days and 4 hours (a semester) at alternating nodes of the Moon's orbit.

Solar eclipse series sets from 2004 to 2007
| Ascending node | | | Descending node | | |
| Saros | Map | Gamma | Saros | Map | Gamma |
| 119 | April 19, 2004 Partial | −1.13345 | 124 | October 14, 2004 Partial | 1.03481 |
| 129 Partial in Naiguatá, Venezuela | April 8, 2005 Hybrid | −0.34733 | 134 Annularity in Madrid, Spain | October 3, 2005 Annular | 0.33058 |
| 139 Totality in Side, Turkey | March 29, 2006 Total | 0.38433 | 144 Partial in São Paulo, Brazil | September 22, 2006 Annular | −0.40624 |
| 149 Partial in Jaipur, India | March 19, 2007 Partial | 1.07277 | 154 Partial in Córdoba, Argentina | September 11, 2007 Partial | −1.12552 |

=== Saros 129 ===
This eclipse is a part of Saros series 129, repeating every 18 years, 11 days, and containing 80 events. The series started with a partial solar eclipse on October 3, 1103. It contains annular eclipses from May 6, 1464 through March 18, 1969; hybrid eclipses from March 29, 1987 through April 20, 2023; and total eclipses from April 30, 2041 through July 26, 2185. The series ends at member 80 as a partial eclipse on February 21, 2528. Its eclipses are tabulated in three columns; every third eclipse in the same column is one exeligmos apart, so they all cast shadows over approximately the same parts of the Earth.

The longest duration of annularity was produced by member 34 at 5 minutes, 10 seconds on October 4, 1698, and the longest duration of totality will be produced by member 58 at 3 minutes, 43 seconds on June 25, 2131. All eclipses in this series occur at the Moon’s ascending node of orbit.

Series members 40–61 occur between 1801 and 2200:
| 40 | 41 | 42 |
|---|---|---|
| December 10, 1806 | December 20, 1824 | December 31, 1842 |
| 43 | 44 | 45 |
| January 11, 1861 | January 22, 1879 | February 1, 1897 |
| 46 | 47 | 48 |
| February 14, 1915 | February 24, 1933 | March 7, 1951 |
| 49 | 50 | 51 |
| March 18, 1969 | March 29, 1987 | April 8, 2005 |
| 52 | 53 | 54 |
| April 20, 2023 | April 30, 2041 | May 11, 2059 |
| 55 | 56 | 57 |
| May 22, 2077 | June 2, 2095 | June 13, 2113 |
| 58 | 59 | 60 |
| June 25, 2131 | July 5, 2149 | July 16, 2167 |
61
July 26, 2185

=== Metonic series ===
The metonic series repeats eclipses every 19 years (6939.69 days), lasting about 5 cycles. Eclipses occur in nearly the same calendar date. In addition, the octon subseries repeats 1/5 of that or every 3.8 years (1387.94 days). All eclipses in this table occur at the Moon's ascending node.

21 eclipse events between June 21, 1982 and June 21, 2058
| June 21 | April 8–9 | January 26 | November 13–14 | September 1–2 |
| 117 | 119 | 121 | 123 | 125 |
|---|---|---|---|---|
| June 21, 1982 | April 9, 1986 | January 26, 1990 | November 13, 1993 | September 2, 1997 |
| 127 | 129 | 131 | 133 | 135 |
| June 21, 2001 | April 8, 2005 | January 26, 2009 | November 13, 2012 | September 1, 2016 |
| 137 | 139 | 141 | 143 | 145 |
| June 21, 2020 | April 8, 2024 | January 26, 2028 | November 14, 2031 | September 2, 2035 |
| 147 | 149 | 151 | 153 | 155 |
| June 21, 2039 | April 9, 2043 | January 26, 2047 | November 14, 2050 | September 2, 2054 |
157
June 21, 2058

=== Tritos series ===
This eclipse is a part of a tritos cycle, repeating at alternating nodes every 135 synodic months (≈ 3986.63 days, or 11 years minus 1 month). Their appearance and longitude are irregular due to a lack of synchronization with the anomalistic month (period of perigee), but groupings of 3 tritos cycles (≈ 33 years minus 3 months) come close (≈ 434.044 anomalistic months), so eclipses are similar in these groupings.

Series members between 1801 and 2200
| October 19, 1808 (Saros 111) | September 19, 1819 (Saros 112) | August 18, 1830 (Saros 113) | July 18, 1841 (Saros 114) | June 17, 1852 (Saros 115) |
| May 17, 1863 (Saros 116) | April 16, 1874 (Saros 117) | March 16, 1885 (Saros 118) | February 13, 1896 (Saros 119) | January 14, 1907 (Saros 120) |
| December 14, 1917 (Saros 121) | November 12, 1928 (Saros 122) | October 12, 1939 (Saros 123) | September 12, 1950 (Saros 124) | August 11, 1961 (Saros 125) |
| July 10, 1972 (Saros 126) | June 11, 1983 (Saros 127) | May 10, 1994 (Saros 128) | April 8, 2005 (Saros 129) | March 9, 2016 (Saros 130) |
| February 6, 2027 (Saros 131) | January 5, 2038 (Saros 132) | December 5, 2048 (Saros 133) | November 5, 2059 (Saros 134) | October 4, 2070 (Saros 135) |
| September 3, 2081 (Saros 136) | August 3, 2092 (Saros 137) | July 4, 2103 (Saros 138) | June 3, 2114 (Saros 139) | May 3, 2125 (Saros 140) |
| April 1, 2136 (Saros 141) | March 2, 2147 (Saros 142) | January 30, 2158 (Saros 143) | December 29, 2168 (Saros 144) | November 28, 2179 (Saros 145) |
October 29, 2190 (Saros 146)

=== Inex series ===
This eclipse is a part of the long period inex cycle, repeating at alternating nodes, every 358 synodic months (≈ 10,571.95 days, or 29 years minus 20 days). Their appearance and longitude are irregular due to a lack of synchronization with the anomalistic month (period of perigee). However, groupings of 3 inex cycles (≈ 87 years minus 2 months) comes close (≈ 1,151.02 anomalistic months), so eclipses are similar in these groupings.

Series members between 1801 and 2200
| August 28, 1802 (Saros 122) | August 7, 1831 (Saros 123) | July 18, 1860 (Saros 124) |
| June 28, 1889 (Saros 125) | June 8, 1918 (Saros 126) | May 20, 1947 (Saros 127) |
| April 29, 1976 (Saros 128) | April 8, 2005 (Saros 129) | March 20, 2034 (Saros 130) |
| February 28, 2063 (Saros 131) | February 7, 2092 (Saros 132) | January 19, 2121 (Saros 133) |
| December 30, 2149 (Saros 134) | December 9, 2178 (Saros 135) | |
