= Solar eclipse of February 16, 1999 =

20th-century annular solar eclipse

- Annular eclipse
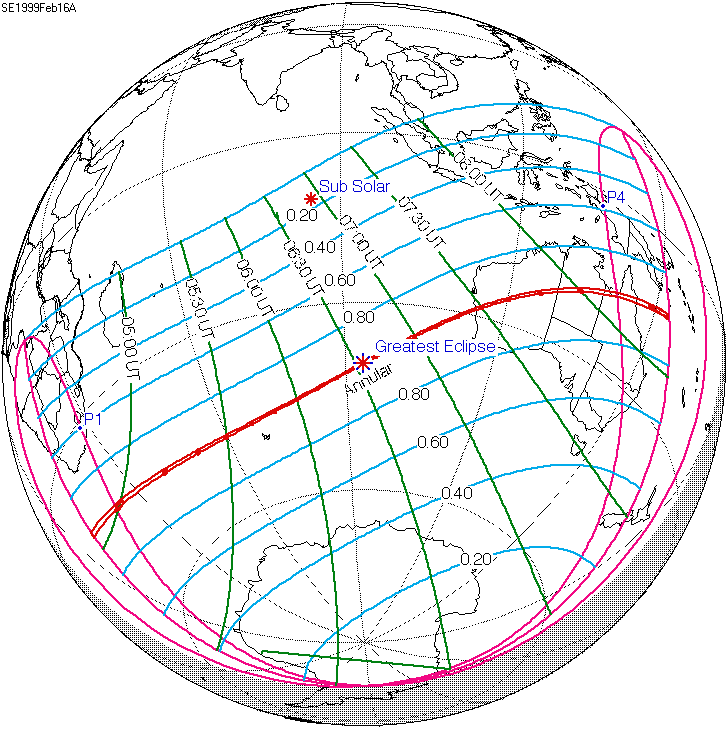
- Map
- Gamma: −0.4726
- Magnitude: 0.9928

Maximum eclipse
- Duration: 40 s (0 min 40 s)
- Coordinates: 39.8°S 93.9°E
- Max. width of band: 29 km (18 mi)

Times (UTC)
- Greatest eclipse: 6:34:38

References
- Saros: 140 (28 of 71)
- Catalog # (SE5000): 9505

External image
- https://geocities.restorativland.org/CapeCanaveral/5599/aus99/first.html

An annular solar eclipse occurred at the Moon's descending node of orbit on Tuesday, February 16, 1999, with a magnitude of 0.9928. A solar eclipse occurs when the Moon passes between Earth and the Sun, thereby totally or partly obscuring the image of the Sun for a viewer on Earth. An annular solar eclipse occurs when the Moon's apparent diameter is smaller than the Sun's, blocking most of the Sun's light and causing the Sun to look like an annulus (ring). An annular eclipse appears as a partial eclipse over a region of the Earth thousands of kilometres wide. The Moon's apparent diameter was near the average diameter because it occurred 7.9 days after apogee (on February 8, 1999, at 8:50 UTC) and 4.3 days before perigee (on February 20, 1999, at 14:30 UTC).

Annularity was visible in the southern Indian Ocean including the Prince Edward Islands, South Africa (the northern part of Marion Island and the whole Prince Edward Island), and Australia. A partial eclipse was visible for parts of Southern Africa, Antarctica, Australia, Indonesia, the Philippines, and western Oceania.

The date of this eclipse was the exact day of Lunar New Year, celebrated in places including Southeast Asia, where a partial eclipse was visible.

== Images ==

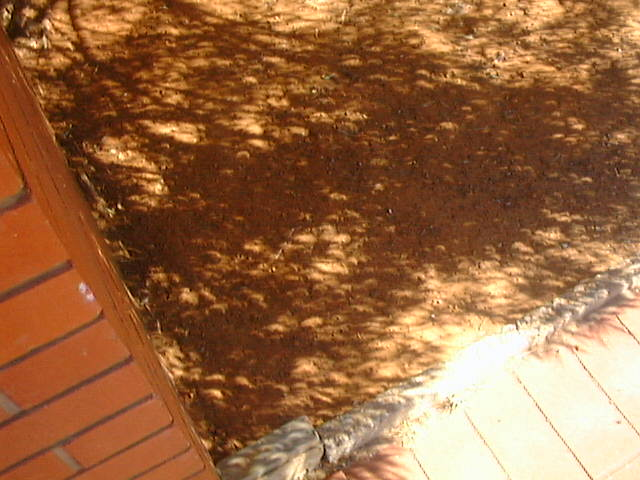
Projection through leaves, from Geraldton, Western Australia

== Eclipse timing ==
=== Places experiencing annular eclipse ===
Solar Eclipse of February 16, 1999 (Local Times)
Country or territory	City or place	Start of partial eclipse	Start of annular eclipse	Maximum eclipse	End of annular eclipse	End of partial eclipse	Duration of annularity (min:s)	Duration of eclipse (hr:min)	Maximum coverage
South Africa	Marion Island	07:02:20	08:08:17	08:08:26	08:08:35	09:21:15	0:18	2:19	97.01%
Australia	Tennant Creek	16:18:21	17:30:24	17:30:54	17:31:25	18:34:35	1:01	2:16	97.17%

=== Places experiencing partial eclipse ===
Solar Eclipse of February 16, 1999 (Local Times)
Country or territory	City or place	Start of partial eclipse	Maximum eclipse	End of partial eclipse	Duration of eclipse (hr:min)	Maximum coverage
Zimbabwe	Harare	06:04:54	06:42:16	07:22:45	1:18	9.32%
Botswana	Gaborone	06:03:17 (sunrise)	06:43:45	07:38:32	1:35	30.44%
South Africa	Johannesburg	05:53:23	06:45:14	07:42:44	1:50	33.95%
Eswatini	Mbabane	05:53:48	06:46:27	07:45:02	1:51	32.59%
Mozambique	Maputo	05:54:22	06:46:53	07:45:22	1:51	30.73%
Lesotho	Maseru	05:52:13	06:47:09	07:48:12	1:57	44.27%
Namibia	Windhoek	06:40:54 (sunrise)	06:49:01	07:32:34	0:52	28.65%
South Africa	Cape Town	06:21:56 (sunrise)	06:49:30	07:50:54	1:29	65.51%
Bouvet Island	Bouvet Island	05:42:17 (sunrise)	06:12:29	07:08:50	1:27	58.45%
French Southern and Antarctic Lands	Île de la Possession	09:07:01	10:19:32	11:39:21	2:32	95.35%
French Southern and Antarctic Lands	Port-aux-Français	09:25:53	10:45:32	12:09:31	2:44	88.33%
Antarctica	Mawson Station	10:48:18	11:48:11	12:49:36	2:01	37.67%
French Southern and Antarctic Lands	Île Amsterdam	09:31:45	11:00:23	12:32:18	3:01	74.25%
Antarctica	Casey Station	13:30:26	14:25:59	15:20:17	1:50	23.89%
New Zealand	Auckland	19:51:39	20:14:40	20:17:29 (sunset)	0:26	16.99%
Australia	Perth	13:58:23	15:24:22	16:40:06	2:42	89.51%
Cocos (Keeling) Islands	Bantam	12:41:17	13:56:44	15:04:02	2:23	21.29%
New Caledonia	Nouméa	18:02:42	18:30:22	18:32:46 (sunset)	0:30	32.28%
Norfolk Island	Kingston	18:27:17	19:01:49	19:04:22 (sunset)	0:37	35.59%
Australia	Melbourne	17:36:30	18:36:51	19:31:59	1:55	42.59%
Solomon Islands	Honiara	18:14:30	18:43:53	18:46:08 (sunset)	0:32	37.76%
Australia	Sydney	17:46:18	18:44:34	19:37:52	1:52	45.79%
Christmas Island	Flying Fish Cove	13:30:14	14:46:27	15:53:03	2:23	30.29%
Australia	Brisbane	16:54:11	17:53:55	18:32:11 (sunset)	1:38	59.07%
Indonesia	Jakarta	13:47:34	14:54:37	15:53:49	2:06	20.85%
Solomon Islands	Gizo	18:15:55	18:55:07	18:57:22 (sunset)	0:41	54.23%
Timor-Leste	Dili	14:59:36	16:10:34	17:12:35	2:13	53.62%
Papua New Guinea	Port Moresby	17:12:29	18:14:54	18:37:12 (sunset)	1:25	79.23%
Indonesia	Jayapura	16:20:46	17:20:54	17:56:54 (sunset)	1:36	50.87%
Palau	Ngerulmud	16:41:24	17:26:43	18:08:22	1:31	15.92%

== Eclipse details ==
Shown below are two tables displaying details about this particular solar eclipse. The first table outlines times at which the Moon's penumbra or umbra attains the specific parameter, and the second table describes various other parameters pertaining to this eclipse.

February 16, 1999 Solar Eclipse Times
Event	Time (UTC)
First Penumbral External Contact	1999 February 16 at 03:53:02.3 UTC
First Umbral External Contact	1999 February 16 at 04:57:41.2 UTC
First Central Line	1999 February 16 at 04:58:28.2 UTC
Greatest Duration	1999 February 16 at 04:58:28.2 UTC
First Umbral Internal Contact	1999 February 16 at 04:59:15.2 UTC
Equatorial Conjunction	1999 February 16 at 06:21:25.3 UTC
Greatest Eclipse	1999 February 16 at 06:34:38.1 UTC
Ecliptic Conjunction	1999 February 16 at 06:39:45.2 UTC
Last Umbral Internal Contact	1999 February 16 at 08:10:12.8 UTC
Last Central Line	1999 February 16 at 08:10:56.9 UTC
Last Umbral External Contact	1999 February 16 at 08:11:40.9 UTC
Last Penumbral External Contact	1999 February 16 at 09:16:13.6 UTC

February 16, 1999 Solar Eclipse Parameters
Parameter	Value
Eclipse Magnitude	0.99276
Eclipse Obscuration	0.98557
Gamma	−0.47260
Sun Right Ascension	21h57m21.0s
Sun Declination	-12°28'00.1"
Sun Semi-Diameter	16'11.4"
Sun Equatorial Horizontal Parallax	08.9"
Moon Right Ascension	21h57m48.9s
Moon Declination	-12°54'33.4"
Moon Semi-Diameter	15'50.7"
Moon Equatorial Horizontal Parallax	0°58'09.2"
ΔT	63.5 s

== Eclipse season ==
This eclipse is part of an eclipse season, a period, roughly every six months, when eclipses occur. Only two (or occasionally three) eclipse seasons occur each year, and each season lasts about 35 days and repeats just short of six months (173 days) later; thus two full eclipse seasons always occur each year. Either two or three eclipses happen each eclipse season. In the sequence below, each eclipse is separated by a fortnight.

Eclipse season of January–February 1999
January 31 Ascending node (full moon)	February 16 Descending node (new moon)
Penumbral lunar eclipse Lunar Saros 114	Annular solar eclipse Solar Saros 140

== Related eclipses ==
=== Eclipses in 1999 ===
- A penumbral lunar eclipse on January 31.
- An annular solar eclipse on February 16.
- A partial lunar eclipse on July 28.
- A total solar eclipse on August 11.

=== Metonic ===
- Preceded by: Solar eclipse of April 29, 1995
- Followed by: Solar eclipse of December 4, 2002

=== Tzolkinex ===
- Preceded by: Solar eclipse of January 4, 1992
- Followed by: Solar eclipse of March 29, 2006

=== Half-Saros ===
- Preceded by: Lunar eclipse of February 9, 1990
- Followed by: Lunar eclipse of February 21, 2008

=== Tritos ===
- Preceded by: Solar eclipse of March 18, 1988
- Followed by: Solar eclipse of January 15, 2010

=== Solar Saros 140 ===
- Preceded by: Solar eclipse of February 4, 1981
- Followed by: Solar eclipse of February 26, 2017

=== Inex ===
- Preceded by: Solar eclipse of March 7, 1970
- Followed by: Solar eclipse of January 26, 2028

=== Triad ===
- Preceded by: Solar eclipse of April 17, 1912
- Followed by: Solar eclipse of December 16, 2085

=== Solar eclipses of 1997–2000 ===
This eclipse is a member of a semester series. An eclipse in a semester series of solar eclipses repeats approximately every 177 days and 4 hours (a semester) at alternating nodes of the Moon's orbit.

The partial solar eclipses on July 1, 2000 and December 25, 2000 occur in the next lunar year eclipse set.

Solar eclipse series sets from 1997 to 2000
Descending node			Ascending node		
Saros	Map	Gamma	Saros	Map	Gamma
120 Totality in Chita, Russia	March 9, 1997 Total	0.9183	125	September 2, 1997 Partial	−1.0352
130 Totality near Guadeloupe	February 26, 1998 Total	0.2391	135	August 22, 1998 Annular	−0.2644
140	February 16, 1999 Annular	−0.4726	145 Totality in France	August 11, 1999 Total	0.5062
150	February 5, 2000 Partial	−1.2233	155	July 31, 2000 Partial	1.2166

=== Saros 140 ===
This eclipse is a part of Saros series 140, repeating every 18 years, 11 days, and containing 71 events. The series started with a partial solar eclipse on April 16, 1512. It contains total eclipses from July 21, 1656 through November 9, 1836; hybrid eclipses from November 20, 1854 through December 23, 1908; and annular eclipses from January 3, 1927 through December 7, 2485. The series ends at member 71 as a partial eclipse on June 1, 2774. Its eclipses are tabulated in three columns; every third eclipse in the same column is one exeligmos apart, so they all cast shadows over approximately the same parts of the Earth.

The longest duration of totality was produced by member 11 at 4 minutes, 10 seconds on August 12, 1692, and the longest duration of annularity will be produced by member 53 at 7 minutes, 35 seconds on November 15, 2449. All eclipses in this series occur at the Moon’s descending node of orbit.

Series members 18–39 occur between 1801 and 2200:
18	19	20
October 29, 1818	November 9, 1836	November 20, 1854
21	22	23
November 30, 1872	December 12, 1890	December 23, 1908
24	25	26
January 3, 1927	January 14, 1945	January 25, 1963
27	28	29
February 4, 1981	February 16, 1999	February 26, 2017
30	31	32
March 9, 2035	March 20, 2053	March 31, 2071
33	34	35
April 10, 2089	April 23, 2107	May 3, 2125
36	37	38
May 14, 2143	May 25, 2161	June 5, 2179
39
June 15, 2197

=== Metonic series ===
The metonic series repeats eclipses every 19 years (6939.69 days), lasting about 5 cycles. Eclipses occur in nearly the same calendar date. In addition, the octon subseries repeats 1/5 of that or every 3.8 years (1387.94 days). All eclipses in this table occur at the Moon's descending node.

21 eclipse events between July 11, 1953 and July 11, 2029
July 10–11	April 29–30	February 15–16	December 4	September 21–23
116	118	120	122	124
July 11, 1953	April 30, 1957	February 15, 1961	December 4, 1964	September 22, 1968
126	128	130	132	134
July 10, 1972	April 29, 1976	February 16, 1980	December 4, 1983	September 23, 1987
136	138	140	142	144
July 11, 1991	April 29, 1995	February 16, 1999	December 4, 2002	September 22, 2006
146	148	150	152	154
July 11, 2010	April 29, 2014	February 15, 2018	December 4, 2021	September 21, 2025
156
July 11, 2029

=== Tritos series ===
This eclipse is a part of a tritos cycle, repeating at alternating nodes every 135 synodic months (≈ 3986.63 days, or 11 years minus 1 month). Their appearance and longitude are irregular due to a lack of synchronization with the anomalistic month (period of perigee), but groupings of 3 tritos cycles (≈ 33 years minus 3 months) come close (≈ 434.044 anomalistic months), so eclipses are similar in these groupings.

Series members between 1801 and 2200
August 28, 1802 (Saros 122)	July 27, 1813 (Saros 123)	June 26, 1824 (Saros 124)	May 27, 1835 (Saros 125)	April 25, 1846 (Saros 126)
March 25, 1857 (Saros 127)	February 23, 1868 (Saros 128)	January 22, 1879 (Saros 129)	December 22, 1889 (Saros 130)	November 22, 1900 (Saros 131)
October 22, 1911 (Saros 132)	September 21, 1922 (Saros 133)	August 21, 1933 (Saros 134)	July 20, 1944 (Saros 135)	June 20, 1955 (Saros 136)
May 20, 1966 (Saros 137)	April 18, 1977 (Saros 138)	March 18, 1988 (Saros 139)	February 16, 1999 (Saros 140)	January 15, 2010 (Saros 141)
December 14, 2020 (Saros 142)	November 14, 2031 (Saros 143)	October 14, 2042 (Saros 144)	September 12, 2053 (Saros 145)	August 12, 2064 (Saros 146)
July 13, 2075 (Saros 147)	June 11, 2086 (Saros 148)	May 11, 2097 (Saros 149)	April 11, 2108 (Saros 150)	March 11, 2119 (Saros 151)
February 8, 2130 (Saros 152)	January 8, 2141 (Saros 153)	December 8, 2151 (Saros 154)	November 7, 2162 (Saros 155)	October 7, 2173 (Saros 156)
September 4, 2184 (Saros 157)	August 5, 2195 (Saros 158)			

=== Inex series ===
This eclipse is a part of the long period inex cycle, repeating at alternating nodes, every 358 synodic months (≈ 10,571.95 days, or 29 years minus 20 days). Their appearance and longitude are irregular due to a lack of synchronization with the anomalistic month (period of perigee). However, groupings of 3 inex cycles (≈ 87 years minus 2 months) comes close (≈ 1,151.02 anomalistic months), so eclipses are similar in these groupings.

Series members between 1801 and 2200
June 16, 1825 (Saros 134)	May 26, 1854 (Saros 135)	May 6, 1883 (Saros 136)
April 17, 1912 (Saros 137)	March 27, 1941 (Saros 138)	March 7, 1970 (Saros 139)
February 16, 1999 (Saros 140)	January 26, 2028 (Saros 141)	January 5, 2057 (Saros 142)
December 16, 2085 (Saros 143)	November 27, 2114 (Saros 144)	November 7, 2143 (Saros 145)
October 17, 2172 (Saros 146)		
