= Solar eclipse of September 2, 2035 =

Total eclipse

- Total eclipse
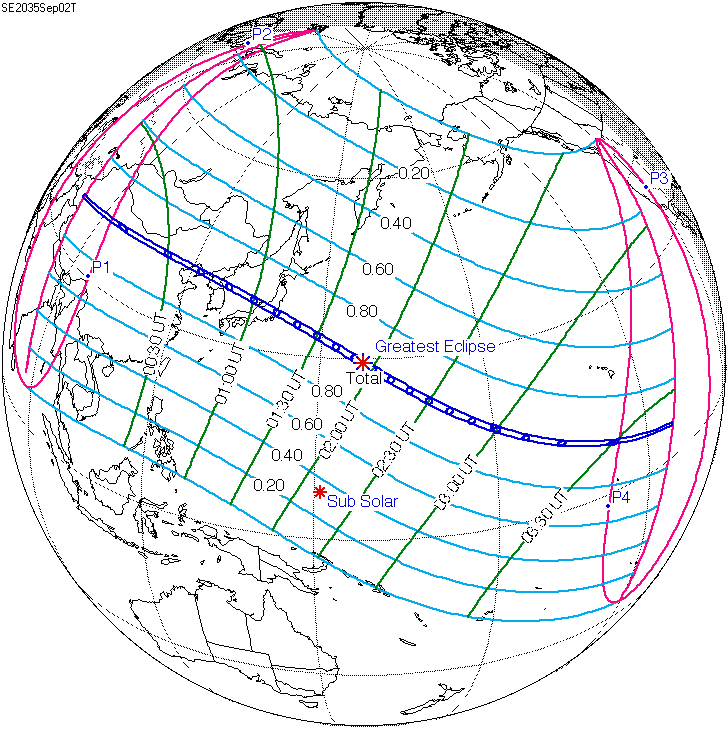
- Map
- Gamma: 0.3727
- Magnitude: 1.032

Maximum eclipse
- Duration: 174 s (2 min 54 s)
- Coordinates: 29.1°N 158°E
- Max. width of band: 116 km (72 mi)

Times (UTC)
- Greatest eclipse: 1:56:46

References
- Saros: 145 (23 of 77)
- Catalog # (SE5000): 9586

A total solar eclipse will occur at the Moon's ascending node of orbit between Saturday, September 1 and Sunday, September 2, 2035, with a magnitude of 1.032. A solar eclipse occurs when the Moon passes between Earth and the Sun, thereby totally or partly obscuring the image of the Sun for a viewer on Earth. A total solar eclipse occurs when the Moon's apparent diameter is larger than the Sun's, blocking all direct sunlight, turning day into darkness. Totality occurs in a narrow path across Earth's surface, with the partial solar eclipse visible over a surrounding region thousands of kilometres wide. Occurring about 2.9 days after perigee (on Thursday, August 30, 2035, at 3:35 UTC), the Moon's apparent diameter will be larger.

Totality will be visible from parts of northern China, North Korea, the extreme northern tip of South Korea (Goseong County, Gangwon Province) and Japan. A partial eclipse will be visible for most of Asia, northern Oceania, Hawaii, southwest Alaska, and the western United States.

== Visibility ==
Animation of the eclipse shadow. The dot in the center represents the path of totality.

The path of totality will cross two Asian capital cities, Beijing, China and Pyongyang, North Korea, and will pass north of a third, Tokyo, Japan.

== Eclipse timing ==
=== Places experiencing total eclipse ===
Solar Eclipse of September 2, 2035 (Local Times)
| Country or territory | City or place | Start of partial eclipse | Start of total eclipse | Maximum eclipse | End of total eclipse | End of partial eclipse | Duration of totality (min:s) | Duration of eclipse (hr:min) | Maximum magnitude |
|---|---|---|---|---|---|---|---|---|---|
| China | Baotou | 07:22:14 | 08:27:38 | 08:28:05 | 08:28:31 | 09:41:06 | 0:53 | 2:19 | 1.0022 |
| China | Datong | 07:23:05 | 08:29:52 | 08:30:39 | 08:31:26 | 09:45:42 | 1:34 | 2:23 | 1.0072 |
| China | Beijing | 07:24:29 | 08:32:50 | 08:33:37 | 08:34:25 | 09:50:22 | 1:35 | 2:26 | 1.0067 |
| China | Tangshan | 07:25:18 | 08:35:00 | 08:35:24 | 08:35:49 | 09:53:13 | 0:49 | 2:28 | 1.0016 |
| China | Qinhuangdao | 07:26:24 | 08:36:13 | 08:37:11 | 08:38:09 | 09:55:36 | 1:56 | 2:29 | 1.0129 |
| North Korea | Pyongyang | 08:30:28 | 09:43:54 | 09:44:48 | 09:45:41 | 11:06:42 | 1:47 | 2:36 | 1.0066 |
| North Korea | Kaechon | 08:31:00 | 09:44:56 | 09:45:12 | 09:45:28 | 11:06:47 | 0:32 | 2:36 | 1.0008 |
| North Korea | Wonsan | 08:32:04 | 09:46:12 | 09:47:15 | 09:48:19 | 11:09:50 | 2:07 | 2:38 | 1.0107 |
| Japan | Toyama | 08:42:11 | 10:03:01 | 10:03:41 | 10:04:22 | 11:31:11 | 1:21 | 2:49 | 1.0027 |
| Japan | Nagano | 08:43:32 | 10:04:25 | 10:05:34 | 10:06:43 | 11:33:19 | 2:18 | 2:50 | 1.0088 |
| Japan | Utsunomiya | 08:45:56 | 10:07:37 | 10:08:52 | 10:10:07 | 11:36:58 | 2:30 | 2:51 | 1.0111 |

=== Places experiencing partial eclipse ===
Solar Eclipse of September 2, 2035 (Local Times)
| Country or territory | City or place | Start of partial eclipse | Maximum eclipse | End of partial eclipse | Duration of eclipse (hr:min) | Maximum coverage |
|---|---|---|---|---|---|---|
| Bangladesh | Dhaka | 05:40:21 (sunrise) | 06:08:22 | 07:04:18 | 1:24 | 42.63% |
| Nepal | Kathmandu | 05:42:48 (sunrise) | 05:54:36 | 06:52:16 | 1:09 | 59.65% |
| Bhutan | Thimphu | 05:40:41 (sunrise) | 06:09:50 | 07:08:57 | 1:28 | 56.70% |
| Vietnam | Hanoi | 06:22:43 | 07:15:28 | 08:14:25 | 1:52 | 29.04% |
| Kazakhstan | Almaty | 05:17:03 (sunrise) | 05:21:05 | 06:18:42 | 1:02 | 81.69% |
| China | Ürümqi | 07:33:33 (sunrise) | 08:21:23 | 09:23:03 | 1:50 | 84.51% |
| Hong Kong | Hong Kong | 07:25:44 | 08:24:49 | 09:31:28 | 2:06 | 33.33% |
| Kyrgyzstan | Bishkek | 06:26:47 (sunrise) | 06:29:44 | 07:18:00 | 0:51 | 73.71% |
| India | New Delhi | 05:59:32 (sunrise) | 06:01:58 | 06:36:23 | 0:37 | 44.05% |
| Mongolia | Ulaanbaatar | 07:29:42 | 08:32:14 | 09:40:14 | 2:11 | 73.91% |
| Russia | Omsk | 06:13:53 (sunrise) | 06:33:38 | 07:24:46 | 1:11 | 43.67% |
| China | Tianjin | 07:24:22 | 08:34:02 | 09:51:29 | 2:27 | 98.52% |
| Russia | Irkutsk | 07:36:02 | 08:35:14 | 09:38:51 | 2:03 | 58.89% |
| Taiwan | Taipei | 07:28:27 | 08:36:04 | 09:52:27 | 2:24 | 45.05% |
| China | Shanghai | 07:25:05 | 08:36:33 | 09:56:58 | 2:32 | 68.81% |
| China | Dalian | 07:27:06 | 08:39:12 | 09:59:06 | 2:32 | 99.06% |
| Uzbekistan | Andijan | 05:38:03 (sunrise) | 05:40:53 | 06:16:16 | 0:38 | 52.03% |
| Pakistan | Lahore | 05:38:48 (sunrise) | 05:41:19 | 06:09:03 | 0:30 | 35.93% |
| North Korea | Nampo | 08:29:59 | 09:44:12 | 11:06:05 | 2:36 | 99.78% |
| Pakistan | Islamabad | 05:41:58 (sunrise) | 05:44:46 | 06:10:52 | 0:29 | 34.03% |
| South Korea | Seoul | 08:30:48 | 09:46:12 | 11:09:22 | 2:39 | 96.56% |
| North Korea | Hamhung | 08:32:38 | 09:47:37 | 11:09:47 | 2:37 | 98.97% |
| Russia | Vladivostok | 09:39:31 | 10:54:47 | 12:15:52 | 2:36 | 84.48% |
| Japan | Tokyo | 08:45:32 | 10:08:49 | 11:37:27 | 2:52 | 99.52% |
| Russia | Yuzhno-Sakhalinsk | 10:56:49 | 12:11:27 | 13:28:58 | 2:32 | 62.64% |
| United States Minor Outlying Islands | Wake Island | 12:57:25 | 14:31:02 | 15:55:09 | 2:58 | 86.78% |
| United States Minor Outlying Islands | Midway Atoll (Note: The times listed for this location occur on September 1, 2035, local time.) | 14:24:10 | 15:43:42 | 16:54:41 | 2:31 | 63.95% |
| Marshall Islands | Majuro | 13:36:02 | 15:00:29 | 16:14:31 | 2:38 | 55.37% |
| United States | Honolulu | 16:08:13 | 17:14:18 | 18:13:15 | 2:05 | 59.85% |
| Kiribati | Kiritimati | 16:30:49 | 17:36:30 | 18:33:34 (sunset) | 2:03 | 78.67% |

== In popular culture ==
The 2035 eclipse is the setting of the 2003 video game Castlevania: Aria of Sorrow. Dracula's castle is located inside the solar eclipse, having been sealed there in 1999.

== Eclipse details ==
Shown below are two tables displaying details about this particular solar eclipse. The first table outlines times at which the Moon's penumbra or umbra attains the specific parameter, and the second table describes various other parameters pertaining to this eclipse.

September 2, 2035 Solar Eclipse Times
| Event | Time (UTC) |
|---|---|
| First Penumbral External Contact | 2035 September 1 at 23:16:45.8 UTC |
| First Umbral External Contact | 2035 September 2 at 00:17:05.5 UTC |
| First Central Line | 2035 September 2 at 00:17:36.1 UTC |
| First Umbral Internal Contact | 2035 September 2 at 00:18:06.7 UTC |
| First Penumbral Internal Contact | 2035 September 2 at 01:28:48.7 UTC |
| Equatorial Conjunction | 2035 September 2 at 01:45:01.1 UTC |
| Greatest Duration | 2035 September 2 at 01:53:17.4 UTC |
| Greatest Eclipse | 2035 September 2 at 01:56:46.3 UTC |
| Ecliptic Conjunction | 2035 September 2 at 02:00:44.2 UTC |
| Last Penumbral Internal Contact | 2035 September 2 at 02:25:01.7 UTC |
| Last Umbral Internal Contact | 2035 September 2 at 03:35:37.6 UTC |
| Last Central Line | 2035 September 2 at 03:36:05.7 UTC |
| Last Umbral External Contact | 2035 September 2 at 03:36:33.8 UTC |
| Last Penumbral External Contact | 2035 September 2 at 04:36:57.8 UTC |

September 2, 2035 Solar Eclipse Parameters
| Parameter | Value |
|---|---|
| Eclipse Magnitude | 1.03204 |
| Eclipse Obscuration | 1.06510 |
| Gamma | 0.37273 |
| Sun Right Ascension | 10h44m07.3s |
| Sun Declination | +08°01'09.8" |
| Sun Semi-Diameter | 15'50.9" |
| Sun Equatorial Horizontal Parallax | 08.7" |
| Moon Right Ascension | 10h44m32.4s |
| Moon Declination | +08°22'14.7" |
| Moon Semi-Diameter | 16'06.4" |
| Moon Equatorial Horizontal Parallax | 0°59'06.9" |
| ΔT | 76.4 s |

== Eclipse season ==
This eclipse is part of an eclipse season, a period, roughly every six months, when eclipses occur. Only two (or occasionally three) eclipse seasons occur each year, and each season lasts about 35 days and repeats just short of six months (173 days) later; thus two full eclipse seasons always occur each year. Either two or three eclipses happen each eclipse season. In the sequence below, each eclipse is separated by a fortnight.

Eclipse season of August–September 2035
| August 19 Descending node (full moon) | September 2 Ascending node (new moon) |
|---|---|
| Partial lunar eclipse Lunar Saros 119 | Total solar eclipse Solar Saros 145 |

== Related eclipses ==
=== Eclipses in 2035 ===
- A penumbral lunar eclipse on February 22.
- An annular solar eclipse on March 9.
- A partial lunar eclipse on August 19.
- A total solar eclipse on September 2.

=== Metonic ===
- Preceded by: Solar eclipse of November 14, 2031
- Followed by: Solar eclipse of June 21, 2039

=== Tzolkinex ===
- Preceded by: Solar eclipse of July 22, 2028
- Followed by: Solar eclipse of October 14, 2042

=== Half-Saros ===
- Preceded by: Lunar eclipse of August 28, 2026
- Followed by: Lunar eclipse of September 7, 2044

=== Tritos ===
- Preceded by: Solar eclipse of October 2, 2024
- Followed by: Solar eclipse of August 2, 2046

=== Solar Saros 145 ===
- Preceded by: Solar eclipse of August 21, 2017
- Followed by: Solar eclipse of September 12, 2053

=== Inex ===
- Preceded by: Solar eclipse of September 22, 2006
- Followed by: Solar eclipse of August 12, 2064

=== Triad ===
- Preceded by: Solar eclipse of November 1, 1948
- Followed by: Solar eclipse of July 4, 2122

=== Solar eclipses of 2033–2036 ===
This eclipse is a member of a semester series. An eclipse in a semester series of solar eclipses repeats approximately every 177 days and 4 hours (a semester) at alternating nodes of the Moon's orbit.

The partial solar eclipse on July 23, 2036 occurs in the next lunar year eclipse set.

Solar eclipse series sets from 2033 to 2036
| Descending node | | | Ascending node | | |
| Saros | Map | Gamma | Saros | Map | Gamma |
| 120 | March 30, 2033 Total | 0.9778 | 125 | September 23, 2033 Partial | −1.1583 |
| 130 | March 20, 2034 Total | 0.2894 | 135 | September 12, 2034 Annular | −0.3936 |
| 140 | March 9, 2035 Annular | −0.4368 | 145 | September 2, 2035 Total | 0.3727 |
| 150 | February 27, 2036 Partial | −1.1942 | 155 | August 21, 2036 Partial | 1.0825 |

=== Saros 145 ===
This eclipse is a part of Saros series 145, repeating every 18 years, 11 days, and containing 77 events. The series started with a partial solar eclipse on January 4, 1639. It contains an annular eclipse on June 6, 1891; a hybrid eclipse on June 17, 1909; and total eclipses from June 29, 1927 through September 9, 2648. The series ends at member 77 as a partial eclipse on April 17, 3009. Its eclipses are tabulated in three columns; every third eclipse in the same column is one exeligmos apart, so they all cast shadows over approximately the same parts of the Earth.

The longest duration of annularity was produced by member 15 at 6 seconds (by default) on June 6, 1891, and the longest duration of totality will be produced by member 50 at 7 minutes, 12 seconds on June 25, 2522. All eclipses in this series occur at the Moon’s ascending node of orbit.

Series members 10–32 occur between 1801 and 2200:
| 10 | 11 | 12 |
|---|---|---|
| April 13, 1801 | April 24, 1819 | May 4, 1837 |
| 13 | 14 | 15 |
| May 16, 1855 | May 26, 1873 | June 6, 1891 |
| 16 | 17 | 18 |
| June 17, 1909 | June 29, 1927 | July 9, 1945 |
| 19 | 20 | 21 |
| July 20, 1963 | July 31, 1981 | August 11, 1999 |
| 22 | 23 | 24 |
| August 21, 2017 | September 2, 2035 | September 12, 2053 |
| 25 | 26 | 27 |
| September 23, 2071 | October 4, 2089 | October 16, 2107 |
| 28 | 29 | 30 |
| October 26, 2125 | November 7, 2143 | November 17, 2161 |
| 31 | 32 | |
| November 28, 2179 | December 9, 2197 | |

=== Metonic series ===
The metonic series repeats eclipses every 19 years (6939.69 days), lasting about 5 cycles. Eclipses occur in nearly the same calendar date. In addition, the octon subseries repeats 1/5 of that or every 3.8 years (1387.94 days). All eclipses in this table occur at the Moon's ascending node.

21 eclipse events between June 21, 1982 and June 21, 2058
| June 21 | April 8–9 | January 26 | November 13–14 | September 1–2 |
| 117 | 119 | 121 | 123 | 125 |
|---|---|---|---|---|
| June 21, 1982 | April 9, 1986 | January 26, 1990 | November 13, 1993 | September 2, 1997 |
| 127 | 129 | 131 | 133 | 135 |
| June 21, 2001 | April 8, 2005 | January 26, 2009 | November 13, 2012 | September 1, 2016 |
| 137 | 139 | 141 | 143 | 145 |
| June 21, 2020 | April 8, 2024 | January 26, 2028 | November 14, 2031 | September 2, 2035 |
| 147 | 149 | 151 | 153 | 155 |
| June 21, 2039 | April 9, 2043 | January 26, 2047 | November 14, 2050 | September 2, 2054 |
157
June 21, 2058

=== Tritos series ===
This eclipse is a part of a tritos cycle, repeating at alternating nodes every 135 synodic months (≈ 3986.63 days, or 11 years minus 1 month). Their appearance and longitude are irregular due to a lack of synchronization with the anomalistic month (period of perigee), but groupings of 3 tritos cycles (≈ 33 years minus 3 months) come close (≈ 434.044 anomalistic months), so eclipses are similar in these groupings.

Series members between 1801 and 2200
| June 16, 1806 (Saros 124) | May 16, 1817 (Saros 125) | April 14, 1828 (Saros 126) | March 15, 1839 (Saros 127) | February 12, 1850 (Saros 128) |
| January 11, 1861 (Saros 129) | December 12, 1871 (Saros 130) | November 10, 1882 (Saros 131) | October 9, 1893 (Saros 132) | September 9, 1904 (Saros 133) |
| August 10, 1915 (Saros 134) | July 9, 1926 (Saros 135) | June 8, 1937 (Saros 136) | May 9, 1948 (Saros 137) | April 8, 1959 (Saros 138) |
| March 7, 1970 (Saros 139) | February 4, 1981 (Saros 140) | January 4, 1992 (Saros 141) | December 4, 2002 (Saros 142) | November 3, 2013 (Saros 143) |
| October 2, 2024 (Saros 144) | September 2, 2035 (Saros 145) | August 2, 2046 (Saros 146) | July 1, 2057 (Saros 147) | May 31, 2068 (Saros 148) |
| May 1, 2079 (Saros 149) | March 31, 2090 (Saros 150) | February 28, 2101 (Saros 151) | January 29, 2112 (Saros 152) | December 28, 2122 (Saros 153) |
| November 26, 2133 (Saros 154) | October 26, 2144 (Saros 155) | September 26, 2155 (Saros 156) | August 25, 2166 (Saros 157) | July 25, 2177 (Saros 158) |
| June 24, 2188 (Saros 159) | May 24, 2199 (Saros 160) | | | |

=== Inex series ===
This eclipse is a part of the long period inex cycle, repeating at alternating nodes, every 358 synodic months (≈ 10,571.95 days, or 29 years minus 20 days). Their appearance and longitude are irregular due to a lack of synchronization with the anomalistic month (period of perigee). However, groupings of 3 inex cycles (≈ 87 years minus 2 months) comes close (≈ 1,151.02 anomalistic months), so eclipses are similar in these groupings.

Series members between 1801 and 2200
| February 11, 1804 (Saros 137) | January 20, 1833 (Saros 138) | December 31, 1861 (Saros 139) |
| December 12, 1890 (Saros 140) | November 22, 1919 (Saros 141) | November 1, 1948 (Saros 142) |
| October 12, 1977 (Saros 143) | September 22, 2006 (Saros 144) | September 2, 2035 (Saros 145) |
| August 12, 2064 (Saros 146) | July 23, 2093 (Saros 147) | July 4, 2122 (Saros 148) |
| June 14, 2151 (Saros 149) | May 24, 2180 (Saros 150) | |
