= Solar eclipse of December 4, 2021 =

Total eclipse in Antarctica

- Total eclipse
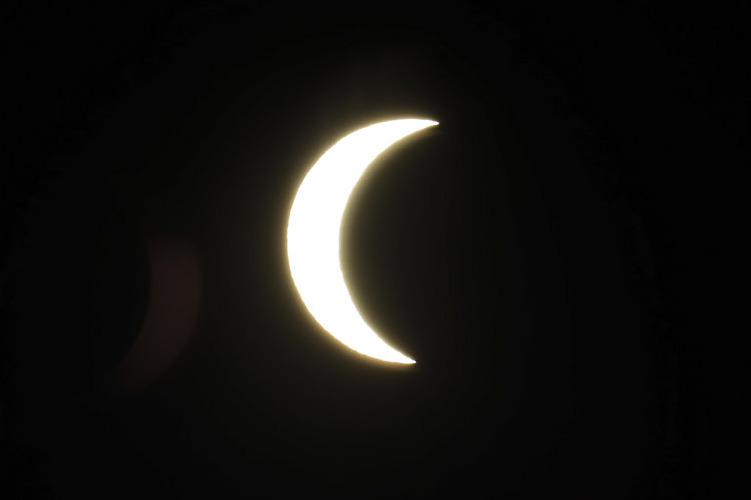
- As observed by the Royal Navy (HMS Protector) off South Georgia

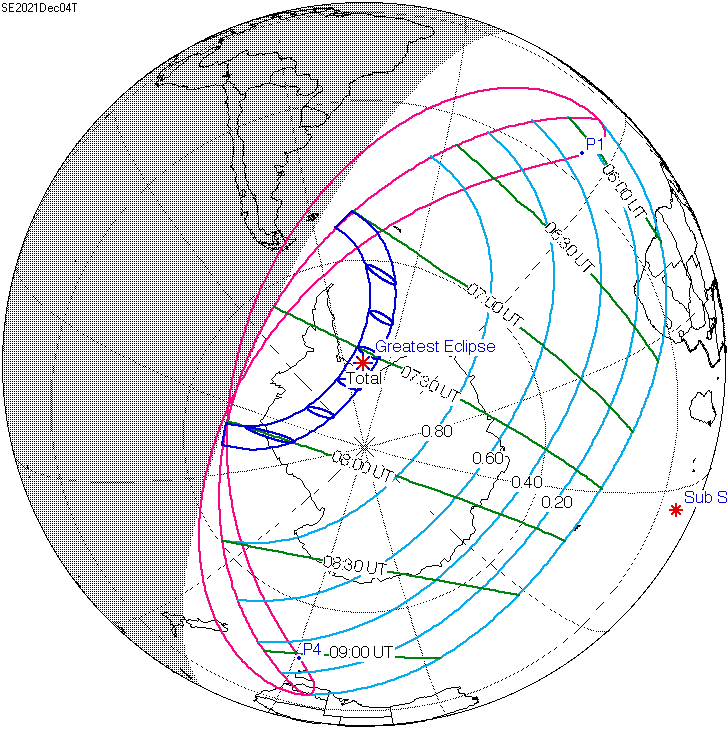
- Map
- Gamma: −0.9526
- Magnitude: 1.0367

Maximum eclipse
- Duration: 114 s (1 min 54 s)
- Coordinates: 76.8°S 46.2°W
- Max. width of band: 419 km (260 mi)

Times (UTC)
- Greatest eclipse: 7:34:38

References
- Saros: 152 (13 of 70)
- Catalog # (SE5000): 9556

A total solar eclipse occurred at the Moon’s descending node of orbit on Saturday, December 4, 2021, with a magnitude of 1.0367. A total solar eclipse occurs when the Moon's apparent diameter is larger than the Sun's and the apparent path of the Sun and Moon intersect, blocking all direct sunlight and turning daylight into darkness; the Sun appears to be black with a halo around it. Totality occurs in a narrow path across Earth's surface, with the partial solar eclipse visible over a surrounding region thousands of kilometres wide. Occurring about 2.5 hours before perigee (on December 4, 2021, at 10:00 UTC), the Moon's apparent diameter was larger.

This eclipse was unusual as the path of the total eclipse moved from east to west across West Antarctica, while most eclipse paths move from west to east. This reversal is only possible in polar regions. Its path across Antarctica crossed near Berkner Island, traversed an arc over the continent and passed over Shepard Island. A partial eclipse was visible for parts of Southern Africa, Antarctica, and Tasmania.

== Images ==
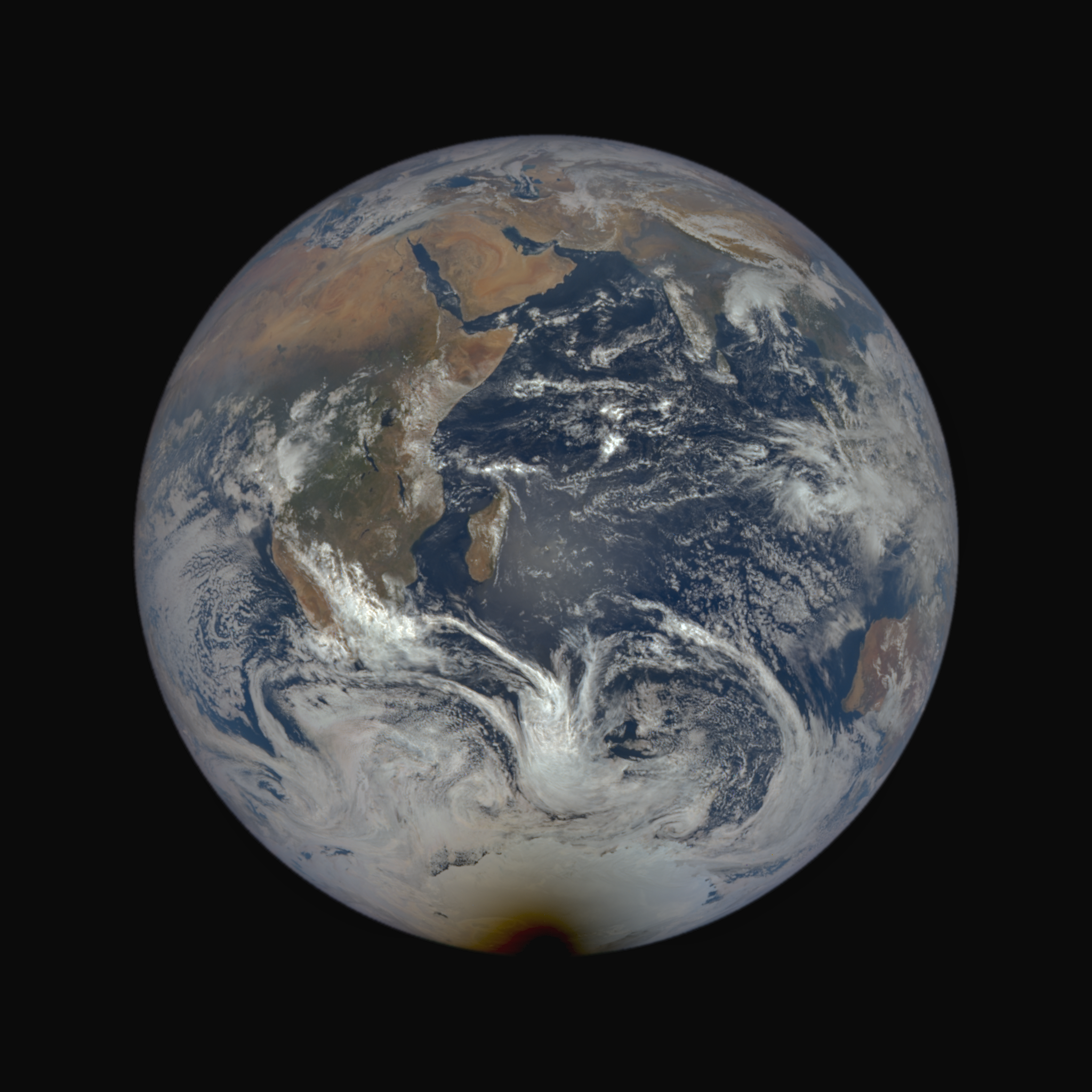
NASA's DSCOVR Satellite photo

Animated path

== Eclipse timing ==
=== Places experiencing total eclipse ===
Solar Eclipse of December 4, 2021 (Local Times)
| Country or territory | City or place | Start of partial eclipse | Start of total eclipse | Maximum eclipse | End of total eclipse | End of partial eclipse | Duration of totality (min:s) | Duration of eclipse (hr:min) | Maximum magnitude |
|---|---|---|---|---|---|---|---|---|---|
| Antarctica | Orcadas Base | 03:20:18 | 04:08:52 | 04:09:22 | 04:09:51 | 05:00:07 | 0:59 | 1:40 | 1.0035 |

=== Places experiencing partial eclipse ===
Solar Eclipse of December 4, 2021 (Local Times)
| Country or territory | City or place | Start of partial eclipse | Maximum eclipse | End of partial eclipse | Duration of eclipse (hr:min) | Maximum coverage |
|---|---|---|---|---|---|---|
| Saint Helena, Ascension and Tristan da Cunha | Jamestown | 05:42:25 (sunrise) | 05:56:45 | 06:21:54 | 0:39 | 5.51% |
| Namibia | Swakopmund | 07:45:43 | 08:00:44 | 08:16:08 | 0:30 | 0.80% |
| Namibia | Walvis Bay | 07:44:50 | 08:01:06 | 08:17:51 | 0:33 | 1.02% |
| South Africa | Bloemfontein | 08:08:31 | 08:14:21 | 08:20:15 | 0:12 | 0.03% |
| Lesotho | Mafeteng | 08:10:33 | 08:16:10 | 08:21:50 | 0:11 | 0.03% |
| South Africa | Cape Town | 07:42:28 | 08:19:08 | 08:58:04 | 1:16 | 11.66% |
| South Africa | Stellenbosch | 07:42:58 | 08:19:18 | 08:57:54 | 1:15 | 11.21% |
| South Africa | George | 07:47:45 | 08:20:53 | 08:55:52 | 1:08 | 7.55% |
| South Africa | Makhanda | 07:55:57 | 08:21:56 | 08:49:05 | 0:53 | 3.14% |
| South Africa | Gqeberha | 07:53:20 | 08:22:33 | 08:53:13 | 1:00 | 4.65% |
| Saint Helena, Ascension and Tristan da Cunha | Edinburgh of the Seven Seas | 05:38:04 | 06:24:11 | 07:13:15 | 1:35 | 52.46% |
| Bouvet Island | Bouvet Island | 06:58:09 | 07:51:44 | 08:48:39 | 1:51 | 63.13% |
| South Georgia and the South Sandwich Islands | King Edward Point | 04:08:23 | 04:57:07 | 05:47:57 | 1:40 | 96.62% |
| South Africa | Marion Island | 09:15:03 | 09:57:35 | 10:42:18 | 1:27 | 12.00% |
| French Southern and Antarctic Lands | Île de la Possession | 11:51:45 | 12:15:42 | 12:40:08 | 0:48 | 1.43% |
| Antarctica | Carlini Base | 03:29:26 | 04:17:25 | 05:06:40 | 1:37 | 95.81% |
| Antarctica | Esperanza Base | 03:29:38 | 04:18:01 | 05:07:43 | 1:38 | 96.14% |
| Antarctica | Marambio Base | 03:30:16 | 04:18:53 | 05:08:48 | 1:39 | 96.19% |
| Falkland Islands | Stanley | 04:29:49 (sunrise) | 04:34:16 | 04:52:35 | 0:23 | 27.61% |
| Chile | Puerto Williams | 04:49:57 (sunrise) | 04:55:01 | 05:01:39 | 0:12 | 6.31% |
| Argentina | Ushuaia | 04:53:35 (sunrise) | 04:59:27 | 05:01:54 | 0:08 | 1.43% |
| New Zealand | Oban | 21:11:21 | 21:23:35 | 21:27:27 (sunset) | 0:16 | 10.53% |
| Antarctica | Casey Station | 18:34:13 | 19:27:20 | 20:18:34 | 1:44 | 37.24% |
| Australia | Macquarie Island | 19:03:23 | 19:49:00 | 20:32:44 | 1:29 | 42.87% |
| Australia | Canberra | 19:56:55 | 20:02:43 | 20:05:45 (sunset) | 0:09 | 0.62% |
| Australia | Hobart | 19:34:16 | 20:06:02 | 20:35:44 (sunset) | 1:01 | 10.98% |
| Australia | Traralgon | 19:49:24 | 20:11:03 | 20:24:11 (sunset) | 0:35 | 3.36% |
| Australia | Melbourne | 19:53:13 | 20:11:57 | 20:29:22 (sunset) | 0:36 | 2.10% |

== Eclipse details ==
Shown below are two tables displaying details about this particular solar eclipse. The first table outlines times at which the Moon's penumbra or umbra attains the specific parameter, and the second table describes various other parameters pertaining to this eclipse.

December 4, 2021 Solar Eclipse Times
| Event | Time (UTC) |
|---|---|
| First Penumbral External Contact | 2021 December 4 at 05:30:26.5 UTC |
| First Umbral External Contact | 2021 December 4 at 07:01:16.7 UTC |
| First Central Line | 2021 December 4 at 07:04:03.2 UTC |
| First Umbral Internal Contact | 2021 December 4 at 07:07:04.8 UTC |
| Greatest Eclipse | 2021 December 4 at 07:34:37.9 UTC |
| Greatest Duration | 2021 December 4 at 07:34:40.1 UTC |
| Ecliptic Conjunction | 2021 December 4 at 07:44:11.1 UTC |
| Equatorial Conjunction | 2021 December 4 at 07:57:20.3 UTC |
| Last Umbral Internal Contact | 2021 December 4 at 08:01:55.8 UTC |
| Last Central Line | 2021 December 4 at 08:04:57.6 UTC |
| Last Umbral External Contact | 2021 December 4 at 08:07:44.3 UTC |
| Last Penumbral External Contact | 2021 December 4 at 09:38:39.3 UTC |

December 4, 2021 Solar Eclipse Parameters
| Parameter | Value |
|---|---|
| Eclipse Magnitude | 1.03673 |
| Eclipse Obscuration | 1.07481 |
| Gamma | −0.95261 |
| Sun Right Ascension | 16h43m32.4s |
| Sun Declination | -22°16'29.4" |
| Sun Semi-Diameter | 16'13.6" |
| Sun Equatorial Horizontal Parallax | 08.9" |
| Moon Right Ascension | 16h42m35.0s |
| Moon Declination | -23°13'22.3" |
| Moon Semi-Diameter | 16'44.7" |
| Moon Equatorial Horizontal Parallax | 1°01'27.3" |
| ΔT | 70.6 s |

== Eclipse season ==
This eclipse is part of an eclipse season, a period, roughly every six months, when eclipses occur. Only two (or occasionally three) eclipse seasons occur each year, and each season lasts about 35 days and repeats just short of six months (173 days) later; thus two full eclipse seasons always occur each year. Either two or three eclipses happen each eclipse season. In the sequence below, each eclipse is separated by a fortnight.

Eclipse season of November–December 2021
| November 19 Ascending node (full moon) | December 4 Descending node (new moon) |
|---|---|
| Partial lunar eclipse Lunar Saros 126 | Total solar eclipse Solar Saros 152 |

== Related eclipses ==
=== Eclipses in 2021 ===
- A total lunar eclipse on May 26.
- An annular solar eclipse on June 10.
- A partial lunar eclipse on November 19.
- A total solar eclipse on December 4.

=== Metonic ===
- Preceded by: Solar eclipse of February 15, 2018
- Followed by: Solar eclipse of September 21, 2025

=== Tzolkinex ===
- Preceded by: Solar eclipse of October 23, 2014
- Followed by: Solar eclipse of January 14, 2029

=== Half-Saros ===
- Preceded by: Lunar eclipse of November 28, 2012
- Followed by: Lunar eclipse of December 9, 2030

=== Tritos ===
- Preceded by: Solar eclipse of January 4, 2011
- Followed by: Solar eclipse of November 3, 2032

=== Solar Saros 152 ===
- Preceded by: Solar eclipse of November 23, 2003
- Followed by: Solar eclipse of December 15, 2039

=== Inex ===
- Preceded by: Solar eclipse of December 24, 1992
- Followed by: Solar eclipse of November 14, 2050

=== Triad ===
- Preceded by: Solar eclipse of February 3, 1935
- Followed by: Solar eclipse of October 5, 2108

=== Solar eclipses of 2018–2021 ===
This eclipse is a member of a semester series. An eclipse in a semester series of solar eclipses repeats approximately every 177 days and 4 hours (a semester) at alternating nodes of the Moon's orbit.

The partial solar eclipses on February 15, 2018 and August 11, 2018 occur in the previous lunar year eclipse set.

Solar eclipse series sets from 2018 to 2021
| Ascending node | | | Descending node | | |
| Saros | Map | Gamma | Saros | Map | Gamma |
| 117 Partial in Melbourne, Australia | July 13, 2018 Partial | −1.35423 | 122 Partial in Nakhodka, Russia | January 6, 2019 Partial | 1.14174 |
| 127 Totality in La Serena, Chile | July 2, 2019 Total | −0.64656 | 132 Annularity in Jaffna, Sri Lanka | December 26, 2019 Annular | 0.41351 |
| 137 Annularity in Beigang, Yunlin, Taiwan | June 21, 2020 Annular | 0.12090 | 142 Totality in Gorbea, Chile | December 14, 2020 Total | −0.29394 |
| 147 Partial in Halifax, Canada | June 10, 2021 Annular | 0.91516 | 152 From HMS Protector off South Georgia | December 4, 2021 Total | −0.95261 |

=== Saros 152 ===
This eclipse is a part of Saros series 152, repeating every 18 years, 11 days, and containing 70 events. The series started with a partial solar eclipse on July 26, 1805. It contains total eclipses from November 2, 1967 through September 14, 2490; hybrid eclipses from September 26, 2508 through October 17, 2544; and annular eclipses from October 29, 2562 through June 16, 2941. The series ends at member 70 as a partial eclipse on August 20, 3049. Its eclipses are tabulated in three columns; every third eclipse in the same column is one exeligmos apart, so they all cast shadows over approximately the same parts of the Earth.

The longest duration of totality will be produced by member 30 at 5 minutes, 16 seconds on June 9, 2328, and the longest duration of annularity will be produced by member 53 at 5 minutes, 20 seconds on February 16, 2743. All eclipses in this series occur at the Moon’s descending node of orbit.

Series members 1–22 occur between 1805 and 2200:
| 1 | 2 | 3 |
|---|---|---|
| July 26, 1805 | August 6, 1823 | August 16, 1841 |
| 4 | 5 | 6 |
| August 28, 1859 | September 7, 1877 | September 18, 1895 |
| 7 | 8 | 9 |
| September 30, 1913 | October 11, 1931 | October 21, 1949 |
| 10 | 11 | 12 |
| November 2, 1967 | November 12, 1985 | November 23, 2003 |
| 13 | 14 | 15 |
| December 4, 2021 | December 15, 2039 | December 26, 2057 |
| 16 | 17 | 18 |
| January 6, 2076 | January 16, 2094 | January 29, 2112 |
| 19 | 20 | 21 |
| February 8, 2130 | February 19, 2148 | March 2, 2166 |
22
March 12, 2184

=== Metonic series ===
The metonic series repeats eclipses every 19 years (6939.69 days), lasting about 5 cycles. Eclipses occur in nearly the same calendar date. In addition, the octon subseries repeats 1/5 of that or every 3.8 years (1387.94 days). All eclipses in this table occur at the Moon's descending node.

21 eclipse events between July 11, 1953 and July 11, 2029
| July 10–11 | April 29–30 | February 15–16 | December 4 | September 21–23 |
| 116 | 118 | 120 | 122 | 124 |
|---|---|---|---|---|
| July 11, 1953 | April 30, 1957 | February 15, 1961 | December 4, 1964 | September 22, 1968 |
| 126 | 128 | 130 | 132 | 134 |
| July 10, 1972 | April 29, 1976 | February 16, 1980 | December 4, 1983 | September 23, 1987 |
| 136 | 138 | 140 | 142 | 144 |
| July 11, 1991 | April 29, 1995 | February 16, 1999 | December 4, 2002 | September 22, 2006 |
| 146 | 148 | 150 | 152 | 154 |
| July 11, 2010 | April 29, 2014 | February 15, 2018 | December 4, 2021 | September 21, 2025 |
156
July 11, 2029

=== Tritos series ===
This eclipse is a part of a tritos cycle, repeating at alternating nodes every 135 synodic months (≈ 3986.63 days, or 11 years minus 1 month). Their appearance and longitude are irregular due to a lack of synchronization with the anomalistic month (period of perigee), but groupings of 3 tritos cycles (≈ 33 years minus 3 months) come close (≈ 434.044 anomalistic months), so eclipses are similar in these groupings.

Series members between 1801 and 2087
| August 17, 1803 (Saros 132) | July 17, 1814 (Saros 133) | June 16, 1825 (Saros 134) | May 15, 1836 (Saros 135) | April 15, 1847 (Saros 136) |
| March 15, 1858 (Saros 137) | February 11, 1869 (Saros 138) | January 11, 1880 (Saros 139) | December 12, 1890 (Saros 140) | November 11, 1901 (Saros 141) |
| October 10, 1912 (Saros 142) | September 10, 1923 (Saros 143) | August 10, 1934 (Saros 144) | July 9, 1945 (Saros 145) | June 8, 1956 (Saros 146) |
| May 9, 1967 (Saros 147) | April 7, 1978 (Saros 148) | March 7, 1989 (Saros 149) | February 5, 2000 (Saros 150) | January 4, 2011 (Saros 151) |
| December 4, 2021 (Saros 152) | November 3, 2032 (Saros 153) | October 3, 2043 (Saros 154) | September 2, 2054 (Saros 155) | August 2, 2065 (Saros 156) |
| July 1, 2076 (Saros 157) | June 1, 2087 (Saros 158) | | | |

=== Inex series ===
This eclipse is a part of the long period inex cycle, repeating at alternating nodes, every 358 synodic months (≈ 10,571.95 days, or 29 years minus 20 days). Their appearance and longitude are irregular due to a lack of synchronization with the anomalistic month (period of perigee). However, groupings of 3 inex cycles (≈ 87 years minus 2 months) comes close (≈ 1,151.02 anomalistic months), so eclipses are similar in these groupings.

Series members between 1801 and 2200
| April 24, 1819 (Saros 145) | April 3, 1848 (Saros 146) | March 15, 1877 (Saros 147) |
| February 23, 1906 (Saros 148) | February 3, 1935 (Saros 149) | January 14, 1964 (Saros 150) |
| December 24, 1992 (Saros 151) | December 4, 2021 (Saros 152) | November 14, 2050 (Saros 153) |
| October 24, 2079 (Saros 154) | October 5, 2108 (Saros 155) | September 15, 2137 (Saros 156) |
| August 25, 2166 (Saros 157) | August 5, 2195 (Saros 158) | |
