= Solar eclipse of December 4, 2002 =

Total eclipse

- Total eclipse
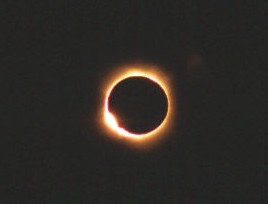
- The diamond ring effect at the end of totality, taken near Woomera, South Australia

- Map
- Gamma: −0.302
- Magnitude: 1.0244

Maximum eclipse
- Duration: 124 s (2 min 4 s)
- Coordinates: 39.5°S 59.6°E
- Max. width of band: 87 km (54 mi)

Times (UTC)
- Greatest eclipse: 7:32:16

References
- Saros: 142 (22 of 72)
- Catalog # (SE5000): 9514

A total solar eclipse occurred at the Moon's descending node of orbit on Wednesday, December 4, 2002, with a magnitude of 1.0244. A solar eclipse occurs when the Moon passes between Earth and the Sun, thereby totally or partly obscuring the image of the Sun for a viewer on Earth. A total solar eclipse occurs when the Moon's apparent diameter is larger than the Sun's, blocking all direct sunlight, turning day into darkness. Totality occurs in a narrow path across Earth's surface, with the partial solar eclipse visible over a surrounding region thousands of kilometres wide. Occurring about 1.9 days after perigee (on December 2, 2002, at 8:50 UTC), the Moon's apparent diameter was larger.

The eclipse was visible from a narrow corridor in parts of Angola, Botswana, Zimbabwe, South Africa, Mozambique, the Indian Ocean and South Australia. A partial eclipse was seen from the much broader path of the Moon's penumbra, including most of Africa and Australia in addition to parts of Indonesia and Antarctica. During the sunset after the eclipse many observers in Australia saw numerous and unusual forms of a green flash.

In some parts of Angola, it was the second total eclipse of the Sun within 18 months, following the solar eclipse of June 21, 2001.

== Observations ==
Animated path

The Chinese Academy of Sciences sent a team to Australia, to study the gravity anomalies first recorded by Indian scientists during the total solar eclipse of October 24, 1995. The Chinese Academy of Sciences also studied it during previous total solar eclipses of March 9, 1997 in Mohe County and June 21, 2001 in Zambia. With continuous observation for more than 10 years after that, China obtained the first observational evidence that the gravity field propagates at the speed of light.

== Eclipse timing ==
=== Places experiencing total eclipse ===
Solar Eclipse of December 4, 2002 (Local Times)
Country or territory	City or place	Start of partial eclipse	Start of total eclipse	Maximum eclipse	End of total eclipse	End of partial eclipse	Duration of totality (min:s)	Duration of eclipse (hr:min)	Maximum magnitude
Angola	Huambo	05:59:17	06:57:34	06:57:58	06:58:23	08:03:55	0:49	2:05	1.0047
Australia	Ceduna	18:40:12	19:40:08	19:40:24	19:40:41	20:29:20 (sunset)	0:33	1:49	1.005

=== Places experiencing partial eclipse ===
Solar Eclipse of December 4, 2002 (Local Times)
Country or territory	City or place	Start of partial eclipse	Maximum eclipse	End of partial eclipse	Duration of eclipse (hr:min)	Maximum coverage
Cameroon	Yaoundé	06:06:40 (sunrise)	06:43:05	07:39:52	1:33	54.58%
Equatorial Guinea	Malabo	06:17:26 (sunrise)	06:43:24	07:39:56	1:23	59.19%
Gabon	Libreville	06:09:15 (sunrise)	06:45:24	07:44:12	1:35	69.50%
São Tomé and Príncipe	São Tomé	05:20:04 (sunrise)	05:45:44	06:43:53	1:24	73.94%
Nigeria	Lagos	06:43:38 (sunrise)	06:47:49	07:37:02	0:53	56.60%
Benin	Porto-Novo	06:46:35 (sunrise)	06:48:56	07:37:07	0:51	56.87%
Republic of the Congo	Brazzaville	05:52:53	06:49:09	07:52:05	1:59	75.25%
Democratic Republic of the Congo	Kinshasa	05:52:54	06:49:12	07:52:11	1:59	75.40%
Angola	Luanda	05:56:10	06:53:15	07:57:05	2:01	93.78%
Burundi	Gitega	06:55:58	07:53:26	08:58:26	2:02	45.12%
Togo	Lomé	05:51:35 (sunrise)	05:53:56	06:37:43	0:46	55.70%
Ghana	Accra	05:56:20 (sunrise)	05:58:40	06:38:32	0:42	53.35%
Saint Helena, Ascension and Tristan da Cunha	Jamestown	05:42:22 (sunrise)	06:01:56	06:54:54	1:13	58.21%
Namibia	Rundu	07:04:42	08:05:47	09:14:42	2:10	93.36%
Zambia	Lusaka	07:02:37	08:07:08	09:20:49	2:18	85.36%
Malawi	Lilongwe	07:03:43	08:09:32	09:25:02	2:21	69.29%
Namibia	Windhoek	07:11:43	08:11:11	09:17:43	2:06	75.11%
Zimbabwe	Harare	07:06:17	08:12:47	09:28:54	2:23	86.88%
Botswana	Gaborone	07:14:36	08:19:18	09:32:29	2:18	86.26%
South Africa	Johannesburg	07:17:27	08:23:27	09:38:06	2:21	86.23%
Eswatini	Mbabane	07:18:26	08:26:24	09:43:29	2:25	92.17%
Mozambique	Maputo	07:18:21	08:27:11	09:45:25	2:27	96.11%
Lesotho	Maseru	07:22:49	08:28:08	09:41:32	2:19	76.60%
Madagascar	Antananarivo	08:22:24	09:35:16	10:58:32	2:36	54.51%
Madagascar	Toliara	08:22:20	09:36:39	11:01:28	2:39	76.57%
French Southern and Antarctic Lands	Port-aux-Français	11:38:56	12:56:50	14:13:50	2:35	75.45%
French Southern and Antarctic Lands	Île Amsterdam	11:41:25	13:08:19	14:30:59	2:50	80.40%
Australia	Sydney	19:12:04	19:50:08	19:53:28 (sunset)	0:41	56.12%
Australia	Melbourne	19:09:07	20:03:30	20:29:04 (sunset)	1:20	68.51%
Australia	Eucla	16:53:28	17:55:44	18:52:04	1:59	93.25%

== Gallery ==
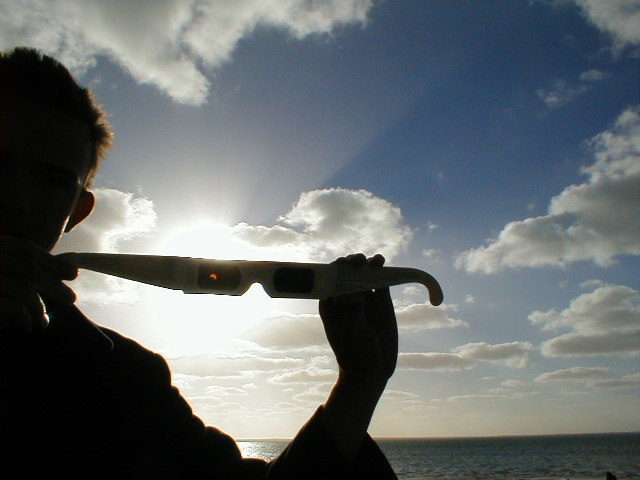
Via eclipse glasses in Ceduna, South Australia

== Eclipse details ==
Shown below are two tables displaying details about this particular solar eclipse. The first table outlines times at which the Moon's penumbra or umbra attains the specific parameter, and the second table describes various other parameters pertaining to this eclipse.

December 4, 2002 Solar Eclipse Times
Event	Time (UTC)
First Penumbral External Contact	2002 December 4 at 04:52:27.3 UTC
First Umbral External Contact	2002 December 4 at 05:51:24.0 UTC
First Central Line	2002 December 4 at 05:51:38.6 UTC
First Umbral Internal Contact	2002 December 4 at 05:51:53.2 UTC
First Penumbral Internal Contact	2002 December 4 at 06:56:18.4 UTC
Greatest Eclipse	2002 December 4 at 07:32:15.7 UTC
Greatest Duration	2002 December 4 at 07:33:01.0 UTC
Ecliptic Conjunction	2002 December 4 at 07:35:26.3 UTC
Equatorial Conjunction	2002 December 4 at 07:39:48.9 UTC
Last Penumbral Internal Contact	2002 December 4 at 08:08:01.3 UTC
Last Umbral Internal Contact	2002 December 4 at 09:12:35.9 UTC
Last Central Line	2002 December 4 at 09:12:48.5 UTC
Last Umbral External Contact	2002 December 4 at 09:13:01.0 UTC
Last Penumbral External Contact	2002 December 4 at 10:12:05.5 UTC

December 4, 2002 Solar Eclipse Parameters
Parameter	Value
Eclipse Magnitude	1.02437
Eclipse Obscuration	1.04934
Gamma	−0.30204
Sun Right Ascension	16h41m50.9s
Sun Declination	-22°13'29.2"
Sun Semi-Diameter	16'13.6"
Sun Equatorial Horizontal Parallax	08.9"
Moon Right Ascension	16h41m32.9s
Moon Declination	-22°31'05.2"
Moon Semi-Diameter	16'21.5"
Moon Equatorial Horizontal Parallax	1°00'02.3"
ΔT	64.4 s

== Eclipse season ==
This eclipse is part of an eclipse season, a period, roughly every six months, when eclipses occur. Only two (or occasionally three) eclipse seasons occur each year, and each season lasts about 35 days and repeats just short of six months (173 days) later; thus two full eclipse seasons always occur each year. Either two or three eclipses happen each eclipse season. In the sequence below, each eclipse is separated by a fortnight.

Eclipse season of November–December 2002
November 20 Ascending node (full moon)	December 4 Descending node (new moon)
Penumbral lunar eclipse Lunar Saros 116	Total solar eclipse Solar Saros 142

== Related eclipses ==
=== Eclipses in 2002 ===
- A penumbral lunar eclipse on May 26.
- An annular solar eclipse on June 10.
- A penumbral lunar eclipse on June 24.
- A penumbral lunar eclipse on November 20.
- A total solar eclipse on December 4.

=== Metonic ===
- Preceded by: Solar eclipse of February 16, 1999
- Followed by: Solar eclipse of September 22, 2006

=== Tzolkinex ===
- Preceded by: Solar eclipse of October 24, 1995
- Followed by: Solar eclipse of January 15, 2010

=== Half-Saros ===
- Preceded by: Lunar eclipse of November 29, 1993
- Followed by: Lunar eclipse of December 10, 2011

=== Tritos ===
- Preceded by: Solar eclipse of January 4, 1992
- Followed by: Solar eclipse of November 3, 2013

=== Solar Saros 142 ===
- Preceded by: Solar eclipse of November 22, 1984
- Followed by: Solar eclipse of December 14, 2020

=== Inex ===
- Preceded by: Solar eclipse of December 24, 1973
- Followed by: Solar eclipse of November 14, 2031

=== Triad ===
- Preceded by: Solar eclipse of February 3, 1916
- Followed by: Solar eclipse of October 4, 2089

=== Solar eclipses of 2000–2003 ===
This eclipse is a member of a semester series. An eclipse in a semester series of solar eclipses repeats approximately every 177 days and 4 hours (a semester) at alternating nodes of the Moon's orbit.

The partial solar eclipses on February 5, 2000 and July 31, 2000 occur in the previous lunar year eclipse set.

Solar eclipse series sets from 2000 to 2003
Ascending node			Descending node		
Saros	Map	Gamma	Saros	Map	Gamma
117	July 1, 2000 Partial	−1.28214	122 Partial projection in Minneapolis, MN, USA	December 25, 2000 Partial	1.13669
127 Totality in Lusaka, Zambia	June 21, 2001 Total	−0.57013	132 Partial in Minneapolis, MN, USA	December 14, 2001 Annular	0.40885
137 Partial in Los Angeles, CA, USA	June 10, 2002 Annular	0.19933	142 Totality in Woomera, South Australia	December 4, 2002 Total	−0.30204
147 Annularity in Culloden, Scotland	May 31, 2003 Annular	0.99598	152	November 23, 2003 Total	−0.96381

=== Saros 142 ===
This eclipse is a part of Saros series 142, repeating every 18 years, 11 days, and containing 72 events. The series started with a partial solar eclipse on April 17, 1624. It contains a hybrid eclipse on July 14, 1768, and total eclipses from July 25, 1786 through October 29, 2543. There are no annular eclipses in this set. The series ends at member 72 as a partial eclipse on June 5, 2904. Its eclipses are tabulated in three columns; every third eclipse in the same column is one exeligmos apart, so they all cast shadows over approximately the same parts of the Earth.

The longest duration of totality will be produced by member 38 at 6 minutes, 34 seconds on May 28, 2291. All eclipses in this series occur at the Moon’s descending node of orbit.

Series members 11–32 occur between 1801 and 2200:
11	12	13
August 5, 1804	August 16, 1822	August 27, 1840
14	15	16
September 7, 1858	September 17, 1876	September 29, 1894
17	18	19
October 10, 1912	October 21, 1930	November 1, 1948
20	21	22
November 12, 1966	November 22, 1984	December 4, 2002
23	24	25
December 14, 2020	December 26, 2038	January 5, 2057
26	27	28
January 16, 2075	January 27, 2093	February 8, 2111
29	30	31
February 18, 2129	March 2, 2147	March 12, 2165
32
March 23, 2183

=== Metonic series ===
The metonic series repeats eclipses every 19 years (6939.69 days), lasting about 5 cycles. Eclipses occur in nearly the same calendar date. In addition, the octon subseries repeats 1/5 of that or every 3.8 years (1387.94 days). All eclipses in this table occur at the Moon's descending node.

21 eclipse events between July 11, 1953 and July 11, 2029
July 10–11	April 29–30	February 15–16	December 4	September 21–23
116	118	120	122	124
July 11, 1953	April 30, 1957	February 15, 1961	December 4, 1964	September 22, 1968
126	128	130	132	134
July 10, 1972	April 29, 1976	February 16, 1980	December 4, 1983	September 23, 1987
136	138	140	142	144
July 11, 1991	April 29, 1995	February 16, 1999	December 4, 2002	September 22, 2006
146	148	150	152	154
July 11, 2010	April 29, 2014	February 15, 2018	December 4, 2021	September 21, 2025
156
July 11, 2029

=== Tritos series ===
This eclipse is a part of a tritos cycle, repeating at alternating nodes every 135 synodic months (≈ 3986.63 days, or 11 years minus 1 month). Their appearance and longitude are irregular due to a lack of synchronization with the anomalistic month (period of perigee), but groupings of 3 tritos cycles (≈ 33 years minus 3 months) come close (≈ 434.044 anomalistic months), so eclipses are similar in these groupings.

Series members between 1801 and 2200
June 16, 1806 (Saros 124)	May 16, 1817 (Saros 125)	April 14, 1828 (Saros 126)	March 15, 1839 (Saros 127)	February 12, 1850 (Saros 128)
January 11, 1861 (Saros 129)	December 12, 1871 (Saros 130)	November 10, 1882 (Saros 131)	October 9, 1893 (Saros 132)	September 9, 1904 (Saros 133)
August 10, 1915 (Saros 134)	July 9, 1926 (Saros 135)	June 8, 1937 (Saros 136)	May 9, 1948 (Saros 137)	April 8, 1959 (Saros 138)
March 7, 1970 (Saros 139)	February 4, 1981 (Saros 140)	January 4, 1992 (Saros 141)	December 4, 2002 (Saros 142)	November 3, 2013 (Saros 143)
October 2, 2024 (Saros 144)	September 2, 2035 (Saros 145)	August 2, 2046 (Saros 146)	July 1, 2057 (Saros 147)	May 31, 2068 (Saros 148)
May 1, 2079 (Saros 149)	March 31, 2090 (Saros 150)	February 28, 2101 (Saros 151)	January 29, 2112 (Saros 152)	December 28, 2122 (Saros 153)
November 26, 2133 (Saros 154)	October 26, 2144 (Saros 155)	September 26, 2155 (Saros 156)	August 25, 2166 (Saros 157)	July 25, 2177 (Saros 158)
June 24, 2188 (Saros 159)	May 24, 2199 (Saros 160)			

=== Inex series ===
This eclipse is a part of the long period inex cycle, repeating at alternating nodes, every 358 synodic months (≈ 10,571.95 days, or 29 years minus 20 days). Their appearance and longitude are irregular due to a lack of synchronization with the anomalistic month (period of perigee). However, groupings of 3 inex cycles (≈ 87 years minus 2 months) comes close (≈ 1,151.02 anomalistic months), so eclipses are similar in these groupings.

Series members between 1801 and 2200
April 3, 1829 (Saros 136)	March 15, 1858 (Saros 137)	February 22, 1887 (Saros 138)
February 3, 1916 (Saros 139)	January 14, 1945 (Saros 140)	December 24, 1973 (Saros 141)
December 4, 2002 (Saros 142)	November 14, 2031 (Saros 143)	October 24, 2060 (Saros 144)
October 4, 2089 (Saros 145)	September 15, 2118 (Saros 146)	August 26, 2147 (Saros 147)
August 4, 2176 (Saros 148)		
