= Solar eclipse of December 26, 2038 =

Total eclipse

- Total eclipse
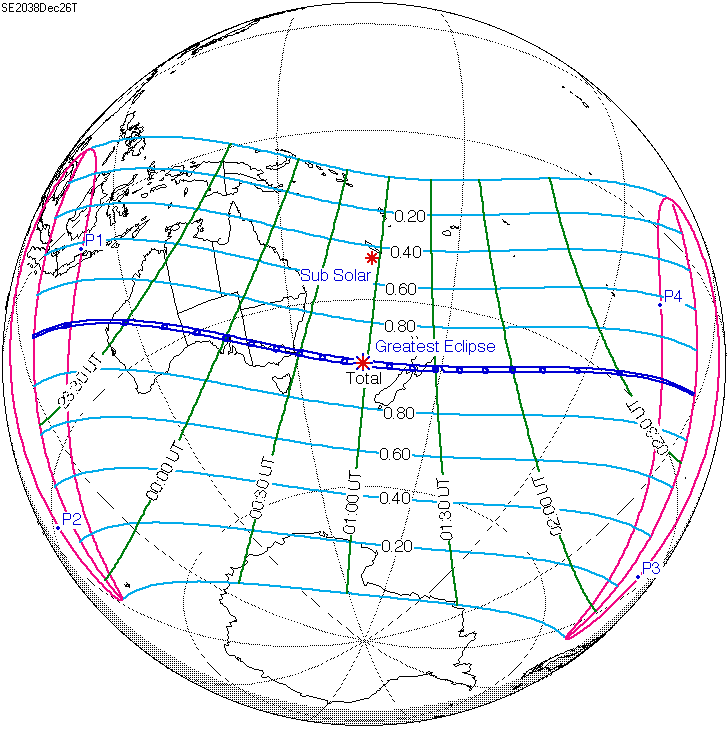
- Map
- Gamma: −0.2881
- Magnitude: 1.0268

Maximum eclipse
- Duration: 138 s (2 min 18 s)
- Coordinates: 40.3°S 164°E
- Max. width of band: 95 km (59 mi)

Times (UTC)
- Greatest eclipse: 1:00:10

References
- Saros: 142 (24 of 72)
- Catalog # (SE5000): 9594

A total solar eclipse will occur at the Moon's descending node of orbit between Saturday, December 25 and Sunday, December 26, 2038, with a magnitude of 1.0268. A solar eclipse occurs when the Moon passes between Earth and the Sun, thereby totally or partly obscuring the image of the Sun for a viewer on Earth. A total solar eclipse occurs when the Moon's apparent diameter is larger than the Sun's, blocking all direct sunlight, turning day into darkness. Totality occurs in a narrow path across Earth's surface, with the partial solar eclipse visible over a surrounding region thousands of kilometres wide. Occurring about 1.7 days after perigee (on December 24, 2038, at 8:25 UTC), the Moon's apparent diameter will be larger.

Totality will be visible from parts of Australia and New Zealand. A partial eclipse will be visible for parts of Southeast Asia, Australia, Antarctica, and Oceania.

In some parts of the world it will fall on Christmas Day, the first such eclipse since 2000, and the last until 2057.

== Images ==
Animated path

== Eclipse timing ==
=== Places experiencing total eclipse ===
Solar Eclipse of December 26, 2038 (Local Times)
Country or territory	City or place	Start of partial eclipse	Start of total eclipse	Maximum eclipse	End of total eclipse	End of partial eclipse	Duration of totality (min:s)	Duration of eclipse (hr:min)	Maximum magnitude
Australia	Whyalla	09:18:49	10:30:43	10:31:38	10:32:34	11:53:57	1:51	2:35	1.0115
Australia	Echuca	09:59:56	11:16:04	11:17:01	11:17:58	12:42:29	1:54	2:43	1.008
Australia	Shepparton	10:01:01	11:17:31	11:18:27	11:19:23	12:44:07	1:52	2:43	1.0074
New Zealand	Paraparaumu	12:55:58	14:21:53	14:22:13	14:22:33	15:44:44	0:40	2:49	1.001
New Zealand	Palmerston North	12:57:01	14:22:35	14:23:39	14:24:43	15:46:14	2:08	2:49	1.0096

=== Places experiencing partial eclipse ===
Solar Eclipse of December 26, 2038 (Local Times)
Country or territory	City or place	Start of partial eclipse	Maximum eclipse	End of partial eclipse	Duration of eclipse (hr:min)	Maximum coverage
Brunei	Bandar Seri Begawan	06:26:53	07:07:26	07:51:34	1:26	17.71%
Singapore	Singapore	07:03:26 (sunrise)	07:09:07	08:00:49	0:57	43.45%
Indonesia	Jakarta	05:38:40 (sunrise)	06:12:20	07:10:19	1:32	63.81%
Christmas Island	Flying Fish Cove	05:35:37 (sunrise)	06:15:18	07:15:07	1:40	80.21%
Malaysia	Kuala Lumpur	07:15:17 (sunrise)	07:17:38	07:58:52	0:44	37.67%
Cocos (Keeling) Islands	Bantam	05:37:39 (sunrise)	05:47:57	06:44:52	1:07	99.36%
Timor-Leste	Dili	07:23:19	08:19:00	09:22:11	1:59	40.87%
Cambodia	Phnom Penh	06:17:09 (sunrise)	06:19:33	06:43:13	0:26	9.87%
Thailand	Pattani	06:23:03 (sunrise)	06:25:30	06:54:01	0:31	21.89%
Thailand	Hat Yai	06:26:54 (sunrise)	06:29:17	06:54:04	0:27	19.04%
Papua New Guinea	Port Moresby	08:56:56	09:48:18	10:45:50	1:49	11.64%
French Southern and Antarctic Lands	Île Amsterdam	04:26:46 (sunrise)	04:48:28	05:23:27	0:57	14.64%
Australia	Melbourne	10:02:46	11:19:32	12:44:06	2:41	95.96%
Australia	Sydney	10:05:04	11:26:29	12:55:41	2:51	87.04%
New Caledonia	Nouméa	10:37:57	11:59:26	13:21:37	2:44	31.71%
Vanuatu	Port Vila	10:53:01	12:04:50	13:16:07	2:23	16.88%
Norfolk Island	Kingston	11:37:37	13:06:09	14:33:57	2:56	56.37%
New Zealand	Wellington	12:55:40	14:21:37	15:44:01	2:48	99.16%
New Zealand	Auckland	12:54:15	14:23:08	15:47:41	2:53	87.77%
Fiji	Suva	12:27:54	13:41:24	14:48:19	2:20	19.65%
Tonga	Nuku'alofa	13:38:20	14:57:26	16:07:14	2:29	33.44%
Chile	Easter Island (Note: The times listed for this location occur on December 25, 2038, local time.)	20:38:56	21:09:32	21:12:54 (sunset)	0:34	39.65%
Niue	Alofi	13:56:53	15:10:57	16:15:39	2:19	31.64%
Samoa	Apia	14:10:02	15:11:14	16:05:34	1:56	14.46%
American Samoa	Pago Pago	14:10:25	15:13:15	16:08:49	1:58	16.58%
Cook Islands	Rarotonga	15:11:19	16:24:57	17:28:58	2:18	51.38%
Pitcairn Islands	Adamstown	17:35:32	18:36:01	19:30:44	1:56	93.95%
French Polynesia	Gambier Islands	16:34:51	17:37:38	18:33:57	1:59	94.98%
French Polynesia	Papeete	15:31:26	16:37:39	17:35:53	2:04	53.52%

== Eclipse details ==
Shown below are two tables displaying details about this particular solar eclipse. The first table outlines times at which the Moon's penumbra or umbra attains the specific parameter, and the second table describes various other parameters pertaining to this eclipse.

December 26, 2038 Solar Eclipse Times
Event	Time (UTC)
First Penumbral External Contact	2038 December 25 at 22:20:51.4 UTC
First Umbral External Contact	2038 December 25 at 23:19:15.0 UTC
First Central Line	2038 December 25 at 23:19:33.4 UTC
First Umbral Internal Contact	2038 December 25 at 23:19:51.9 UTC
First Penumbral Internal Contact	2038 December 26 at 00:23:04.9 UTC
Greatest Duration	2038 December 26 at 00:59:26.3 UTC
Greatest Eclipse	2038 December 26 at 01:00:09.7 UTC
Equatorial Conjunction	2038 December 26 at 01:02:10.7 UTC
Ecliptic Conjunction	2038 December 26 at 01:03:10.7 UTC
Last Penumbral Internal Contact	2038 December 26 at 01:37:10.7 UTC
Last Umbral Internal Contact	2038 December 26 at 02:40:28.5 UTC
Last Central Line	2038 December 26 at 02:40:45.0 UTC
Last Umbral External Contact	2038 December 26 at 02:41:01.5 UTC
Last Penumbral External Contact	2038 December 26 at 03:39:31.2 UTC

December 26, 2038 Solar Eclipse Parameters
Parameter	Value
Eclipse Magnitude	1.02685
Eclipse Obscuration	1.05443
Gamma	−0.28813
Sun Right Ascension	18h18m51.7s
Sun Declination	-23°21'47.8"
Sun Semi-Diameter	16'15.7"
Sun Equatorial Horizontal Parallax	08.9"
Moon Right Ascension	18h18m46.7s
Moon Declination	-23°39'05.4"
Moon Semi-Diameter	16'25.8"
Moon Equatorial Horizontal Parallax	1°00'18.1"
ΔT	78.0 s

== Eclipse season ==
This eclipse is part of an eclipse season, a period, roughly every six months, when eclipses occur. Only two (or occasionally three) eclipse seasons occur each year, and each season lasts about 35 days and repeats just short of six months (173 days) later; thus two full eclipse seasons always occur each year. Either two or three eclipses happen each eclipse season. In the sequence below, each eclipse is separated by a fortnight.

Eclipse season of December 2038
December 11 Ascending node (full moon)	December 26 Descending node (new moon)
Penumbral lunar eclipse Lunar Saros 116	Total solar eclipse Solar Saros 142

== Related eclipses ==
=== Eclipses in 2038 ===
- An annular solar eclipse on January 5.
- A penumbral lunar eclipse on January 21.
- A penumbral lunar eclipse on June 17.
- An annular solar eclipse on July 2.
- A penumbral lunar eclipse on July 16.
- A penumbral lunar eclipse on December 11.
- A total solar eclipse on December 26.

=== Metonic ===
- Preceded by: Solar eclipse of March 9, 2035
- Followed by: Solar eclipse of October 14, 2042

=== Tzolkinex ===
- Preceded by: Solar eclipse of November 14, 2031
- Followed by: Solar eclipse of February 5, 2046

=== Half-Saros ===
- Preceded by: Lunar eclipse of December 20, 2029
- Followed by: Lunar eclipse of January 1, 2048

=== Tritos ===
- Preceded by: Solar eclipse of January 26, 2028
- Followed by: Solar eclipse of November 25, 2049

=== Solar Saros 142 ===
- Preceded by: Solar eclipse of December 14, 2020
- Followed by: Solar eclipse of January 5, 2057

=== Inex ===
- Preceded by: Solar eclipse of January 15, 2010
- Followed by: Solar eclipse of December 6, 2067

=== Triad ===
- Preceded by: Solar eclipse of February 25, 1952
- Followed by: Solar eclipse of October 26, 2125

=== Solar eclipses of 2036–2039 ===
This eclipse is a member of a semester series. An eclipse in a semester series of solar eclipses repeats approximately every 177 days and 4 hours (a semester) at alternating nodes of the Moon's orbit.

The partial solar eclipses on February 27, 2036 and August 21, 2036 occur in the previous lunar year eclipse set.

Solar eclipse series sets from 2036 to 2039
Ascending node			Descending node		
Saros	Map	Gamma	Saros	Map	Gamma
117	July 23, 2036 Partial	−1.425	122	January 16, 2037 Partial	1.1477
127	July 13, 2037 Total	−0.7246	132	January 5, 2038 Annular	0.4169
137	July 2, 2038 Annular	0.0398	142	December 26, 2038 Total	−0.2881
147	June 21, 2039 Annular	0.8312	152	December 15, 2039 Total	−0.9458

=== Saros 142 ===
This eclipse is a part of Saros series 142, repeating every 18 years, 11 days, and containing 72 events. The series started with a partial solar eclipse on April 17, 1624. It contains a hybrid eclipse on July 14, 1768, and total eclipses from July 25, 1786 through October 29, 2543. There are no annular eclipses in this set. The series ends at member 72 as a partial eclipse on June 5, 2904. Its eclipses are tabulated in three columns; every third eclipse in the same column is one exeligmos apart, so they all cast shadows over approximately the same parts of the Earth.

The longest duration of totality will be produced by member 38 at 6 minutes, 34 seconds on May 28, 2291. All eclipses in this series occur at the Moon’s descending node of orbit.

Series members 11–32 occur between 1801 and 2200:
11	12	13
August 5, 1804	August 16, 1822	August 27, 1840
14	15	16
September 7, 1858	September 17, 1876	September 29, 1894
17	18	19
October 10, 1912	October 21, 1930	November 1, 1948
20	21	22
November 12, 1966	November 22, 1984	December 4, 2002
23	24	25
December 14, 2020	December 26, 2038	January 5, 2057
26	27	28
January 16, 2075	January 27, 2093	February 8, 2111
29	30	31
February 18, 2129	March 2, 2147	March 12, 2165
32
March 23, 2183

=== Metonic series ===
The metonic series repeats eclipses every 19 years (6939.69 days), lasting about 5 cycles. Eclipses occur in nearly the same calendar date. In addition, the octon subseries repeats 1/5 of that or every 3.8 years (1387.94 days). All eclipses in this table occur at the Moon's descending node.

21 eclipse events between May 21, 1993 and May 20, 2069
May 20–21	March 9	December 25–26	October 13–14	August 1–2
118	120	122	124	126
May 21, 1993	March 9, 1997	December 25, 2000	October 14, 2004	August 1, 2008
128	130	132	134	136
May 20, 2012	March 9, 2016	December 26, 2019	October 14, 2023	August 2, 2027
138	140	142	144	146
May 21, 2031	March 9, 2035	December 26, 2038	October 14, 2042	August 2, 2046
148	150	152	154	156
May 20, 2050	March 9, 2054	December 26, 2057	October 13, 2061	August 2, 2065
158
May 20, 2069

=== Tritos series ===
This eclipse is a part of a tritos cycle, repeating at alternating nodes every 135 synodic months (≈ 3986.63 days, or 11 years minus 1 month). Their appearance and longitude are irregular due to a lack of synchronization with the anomalistic month (period of perigee), but groupings of 3 tritos cycles (≈ 33 years minus 3 months) come close (≈ 434.044 anomalistic months), so eclipses are similar in these groupings.

Series members between 1801 and 2200
October 9, 1809 (Saros 121)	September 7, 1820 (Saros 122)	August 7, 1831 (Saros 123)	July 8, 1842 (Saros 124)	June 6, 1853 (Saros 125)
May 6, 1864 (Saros 126)	April 6, 1875 (Saros 127)	March 5, 1886 (Saros 128)	February 1, 1897 (Saros 129)	January 3, 1908 (Saros 130)
December 3, 1918 (Saros 131)	November 1, 1929 (Saros 132)	October 1, 1940 (Saros 133)	September 1, 1951 (Saros 134)	July 31, 1962 (Saros 135)
June 30, 1973 (Saros 136)	May 30, 1984 (Saros 137)	April 29, 1995 (Saros 138)	March 29, 2006 (Saros 139)	February 26, 2017 (Saros 140)
January 26, 2028 (Saros 141)	December 26, 2038 (Saros 142)	November 25, 2049 (Saros 143)	October 24, 2060 (Saros 144)	September 23, 2071 (Saros 145)
August 24, 2082 (Saros 146)	July 23, 2093 (Saros 147)	June 22, 2104 (Saros 148)	May 24, 2115 (Saros 149)	April 22, 2126 (Saros 150)
March 21, 2137 (Saros 151)	February 19, 2148 (Saros 152)	January 19, 2159 (Saros 153)	December 18, 2169 (Saros 154)	November 17, 2180 (Saros 155)
October 18, 2191 (Saros 156)

=== Inex series ===
This eclipse is a part of the long period inex cycle, repeating at alternating nodes, every 358 synodic months (≈ 10,571.95 days, or 29 years minus 20 days). Their appearance and longitude are irregular due to a lack of synchronization with the anomalistic month (period of perigee). However, groupings of 3 inex cycles (≈ 87 years minus 2 months) comes close (≈ 1,151.02 anomalistic months), so eclipses are similar in these groupings.

Series members between 1801 and 2200
June 6, 1807 (Saros 134)	May 15, 1836 (Saros 135)	April 25, 1865 (Saros 136)
April 6, 1894 (Saros 137)	March 17, 1923 (Saros 138)	February 25, 1952 (Saros 139)
February 4, 1981 (Saros 140)	January 15, 2010 (Saros 141)	December 26, 2038 (Saros 142)
December 6, 2067 (Saros 143)	November 15, 2096 (Saros 144)	October 26, 2125 (Saros 145)
October 7, 2154 (Saros 146)	September 16, 2183 (Saros 147)	
