= Solar eclipse of September 12, 2034 =

Future annular solar eclipse

- Annular eclipse
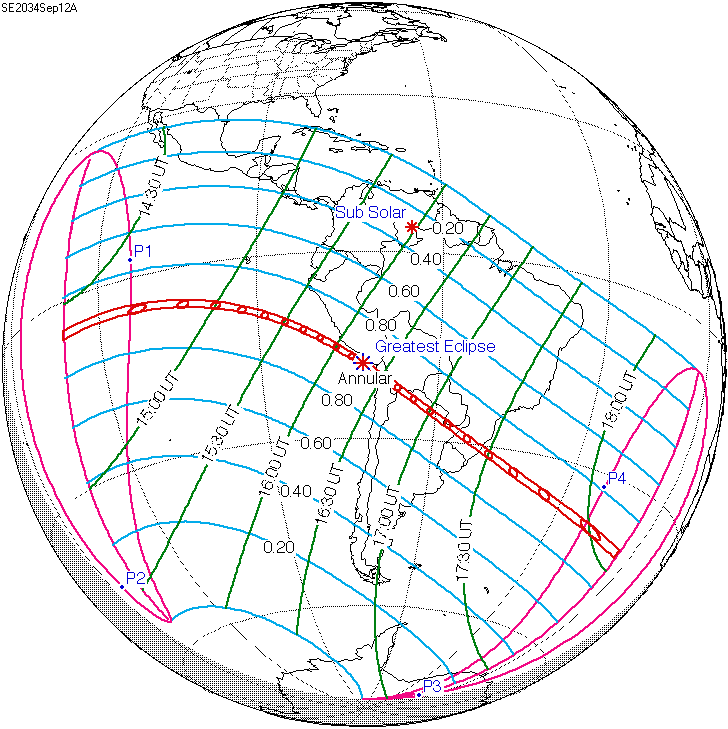
- Map
- Gamma: −0.3936
- Magnitude: 0.9736

Maximum eclipse
- Duration: 178 s (2 min 58 s)
- Coordinates: 18.2°S 72.6°W
- Max. width of band: 102 km (63 mi)

Times (UTC)
- Greatest eclipse: 16:19:28

References
- Saros: 135 (40 of 71)
- Catalog # (SE5000): 9584

An annular solar eclipse will occur at the Moon's ascending node of orbit on Tuesday, September 12, 2034, with a magnitude of 0.9736. A solar eclipse occurs when the Moon passes between Earth and the Sun, thereby totally or partly obscuring the image of the Sun for a viewer on Earth. An annular solar eclipse occurs when the Moon's apparent diameter is smaller than the Sun's, blocking most of the Sun's light and causing the Sun to look like an annulus (ring). An annular eclipse appears as a partial eclipse over a region of the Earth thousands of kilometres wide. Occurring about 5.7 days before apogee (on September 18, 2034, at 8:05 UTC), the Moon's apparent diameter will be smaller.

The eclipse will commence over the southern Pacific Ocean and then enter South America. Countries under the path include northern Chile, southern Bolivia, northern Argentina, southern Paraguay, and southern Brazil. The eclipse will then enter the Atlantic Ocean, and terminate approximately 2,000 miles (3,200 km) southeast of South America. A partial eclipse will be visible for parts of Central America, the Caribbean, South America, and Antarctica.

== Images ==
Animated path

== Eclipse timing ==
=== Places experiencing total eclipse ===
Solar Eclipse of September 12, 2034 (Local Times)
| Country or territory | City or place | Start of partial eclipse | Start of annular eclipse | Maximum eclipse | End of annular eclipse | End of partial eclipse | Duration of annularity (min:s) | Duration of eclipse (hr:min) | Maximum coverage |
|---|---|---|---|---|---|---|---|---|---|
| Chile | Iquique | 11:41:08 | 13:27:42 | 13:28:45 | 13:29:48 | 15:16:14 | 2:06 | 3:35 | 94.92% |
| Brazil | Santa Maria | 12:38:35 | 14:19:26 | 14:20:11 | 14:20:57 | 15:51:08 | 1:31 | 3:13 | 94.31% |
| Brazil | Porto Alegre | 12:45:22 | 14:24:20 | 14:25:28 | 14:26:35 | 15:54:18 | 2:15 | 3:09 | 94.21% |

=== Places experiencing partial eclipse ===
Solar Eclipse of September 12, 2034 (Local Times)
| Country or territory | City or place | Start of partial eclipse | Maximum eclipse | End of partial eclipse | Duration of eclipse (hr:min) | Maximum coverage |
|---|---|---|---|---|---|---|
| Clipperton Island | Clipperton Island | 05:29:59 | 06:31:44 | 07:42:43 | 2:13 | 40.61% |
| Mexico | Mexico City | 07:49:39 | 08:37:29 | 09:30:14 | 1:41 | 11:36% |
| Guatemala | Guatemala City | 07:47:57 | 08:49:26 | 09:58:49 | 2:11 | 19.90% |
| El Salvador | San Salvador | 07:48:10 | 08:52:00 | 10:04:12 | 2:16 | 21.54% |
| Pitcairn Islands | Adamstown | 06:40:26 (sunrise) | 06:53:57 | 07:55:11 | 1:15 | 36.88% |
| Honduras | Tegucigalpa | 07:51:57 | 08:54:53 | 10:05:37 | 2:14 | 19.04% |
| Nicaragua | Managua | 07:50:11 | 08:57:54 | 10:14:37 | 2:24 | 23.67% |
| French Polynesia | Gambier Islands | 05:59:13 (sunrise) | 06:02:19 | 06:51:06 | 0:52 | 38.96% |
| Costa Rica | San José | 07:50:57 | 09:03:50 | 10:26:36 | 2:36 | 28.06% |
| Ecuador | Galápagos Islands | 07:39:59 | 09:05:33 | 10:46:51 | 3:07 | 68.53% |
| Panama | Panama City | 08:59:01 | 10:14:03 | 11:38:01 | 2:39 | 25.91% |
| French Polynesia | Taioha'e | 05:43:22 (sunrise) | 05:46:19 | 06:10:24 | 0:27 | 23.86% |
| Ecuador | Quito | 08:57:28 | 10:29:23 | 12:12:47 | 3:15 | 52.15% |
| Colombia | Bogotá | 09:08:41 | 10:32:48 | 12:04:47 | 2:56 | 31.09% |
| Venezuela | Caracas | 10:43:14 | 11:41:57 | 12:43:01 | 2:00 | 7.53% |
| Peru | Lima | 09:11:26 | 10:54:25 | 12:46:22 | 3:35 | 86.70% |
| Chile | Arica | 11:37:26 | 13:25:18 | 15:13:44 | 3:36 | 93.37% |
| Bolivia | La Paz | 10:39:28 | 12:28:02 | 14:15:46 | 3:36 | 83.34% |
| Chile | Antofagasta | 11:47:34 | 13:33:37 | 15:18:49 | 3:31 | 85.51% |
| Chile | Santiago | 12:09:24 | 13:45:49 | 15:20:15 | 3:11 | 57.94% |
| Paraguay | Asunción | 12:22:24 | 14:08:13 | 15:44:18 | 3:22 | 90.63% |
| Argentina | Buenos Aires | 12:35:47 | 14:13:45 | 15:43:48 | 3:08 | 73.12% |
| Falkland Islands | Stanley | 13:04:59 | 14:16:20 | 15:24:23 | 2:19 | 29.93% |
| Uruguay | Montevideo | 12:40:47 | 14:18:11 | 15:46:57 | 3:06 | 75.36% |
| Bouvet Island | Bouvet Island | 18:49:15 | 19:20:13 | 19:26:19 (sunset) | 0:37 | 28.71% |
| Brazil | Brasília | 12:45:17 | 14:20:38 | 15:44:12 | 2:59 | 43.94% |
| Brazil | São Paulo | 12:52:15 | 14:30:28 | 15:55:59 | 3:04 | 67.27% |
| Brazil | Rio de Janeiro | 13:02:14 | 14:36:36 | 15:58:14 | 2:56 | 60.51% |
| South Georgia and the South Sandwich Islands | King Edward Point | 14:28:11 | 15:37:10 | 16:41:31 | 2:13 | 39.21% |
| Saint Helena, Ascension and Tristan da Cunha | Edinburgh of the Seven Seas | 16:52:44 | 18:04:07 | 18:37:40 (sunset) | 1:45 | 85.15% |

== Eclipse details ==
Shown below are two tables displaying details about this particular solar eclipse. The first table outlines times at which the Moon's penumbra or umbra attains the specific parameter, and the second table describes various other parameters pertaining to this eclipse.

September 12, 2034 Solar Eclipse Times
| Event | Time (UTC) |
|---|---|
| First Penumbral External Contact | 2034 September 12 at 13:27:53.6 UTC |
| First Umbral External Contact | 2034 September 12 at 14:33:23.3 UTC |
| First Central Line | 2034 September 12 at 14:34:48.1 UTC |
| First Umbral Internal Contact | 2034 September 12 at 14:36:13.0 UTC |
| First Penumbral Internal Contact | 2034 September 12 at 15:56:56.6 UTC |
| Ecliptic Conjunction | 2034 September 12 at 16:14:59.5 UTC |
| Greatest Eclipse | 2034 September 12 at 16:19:27.5 UTC |
| Greatest Duration | 2034 September 12 at 16:30:44.1 UTC |
| Equatorial Conjunction | 2034 September 12 at 16:33:31.2 UTC |
| Last Penumbral Internal Contact | 2034 September 12 at 16:41:33.8 UTC |
| Last Umbral Internal Contact | 2034 September 12 at 18:02:29.4 UTC |
| Last Central Line | 2034 September 12 at 18:03:57.4 UTC |
| Last Umbral External Contact | 2034 September 12 at 18:05:25.2 UTC |
| Last Penumbral External Contact | 2034 September 12 at 19:11:01.2 UTC |

September 12, 2034 Solar Eclipse Parameters
| Parameter | Value |
|---|---|
| Eclipse Magnitude | 0.97364 |
| Eclipse Obscuration | 0.94798 |
| Gamma | −0.39356 |
| Sun Right Ascension | 11h23m10.9s |
| Sun Declination | +03°57'57.5" |
| Sun Semi-Diameter | 15'53.5" |
| Sun Equatorial Horizontal Parallax | 08.7" |
| Moon Right Ascension | 11h22m44.5s |
| Moon Declination | +03°36'59.6" |
| Moon Semi-Diameter | 15'15.1" |
| Moon Equatorial Horizontal Parallax | 0°55'58.6" |
| ΔT | 76.0 s |

== Eclipse season ==
This eclipse is part of an eclipse season, a period, roughly every six months, when eclipses occur. Only two (or occasionally three) eclipse seasons occur each year, and each season lasts about 35 days and repeats just short of six months (173 days) later; thus two full eclipse seasons always occur each year. Either two or three eclipses happen each eclipse season. In the sequence below, each eclipse is separated by a fortnight.

Eclipse season of September 2034
| September 12 Ascending node (new moon) | September 28 Descending node (full moon) |
|---|---|
| Annular solar eclipse Solar Saros 135 | Partial lunar eclipse Lunar Saros 147 |

== Related eclipses ==
=== Eclipses in 2034 ===
- A total solar eclipse on March 20.
- A penumbral lunar eclipse on April 3.
- An annular solar eclipse on September 12.
- A partial lunar eclipse on September 28.

=== Metonic ===
- Preceded by: Solar eclipse of November 25, 2030
- Followed by: Solar eclipse of July 2, 2038

=== Tzolkinex ===
- Preceded by: Solar eclipse of August 2, 2027
- Followed by: Solar eclipse of October 25, 2041

=== Half-Saros ===
- Preceded by: Lunar eclipse of September 7, 2025
- Followed by: Lunar eclipse of September 19, 2043

=== Tritos ===
- Preceded by: Solar eclipse of October 14, 2023
- Followed by: Solar eclipse of August 12, 2045

=== Solar Saros 135 ===
- Preceded by: Solar eclipse of September 1, 2016
- Followed by: Solar eclipse of September 22, 2052

=== Inex ===
- Preceded by: Solar eclipse of October 3, 2005
- Followed by: Solar eclipse of August 24, 2063

=== Triad ===
- Preceded by: Solar eclipse of November 12, 1947
- Followed by: Solar eclipse of July 14, 2121

=== Solar eclipses of 2033–2036 ===
This eclipse is a member of a semester series. An eclipse in a semester series of solar eclipses repeats approximately every 177 days and 4 hours (a semester) at alternating nodes of the Moon's orbit.

The partial solar eclipse on July 23, 2036 occurs in the next lunar year eclipse set.

Solar eclipse series sets from 2033 to 2036
| Descending node | | | Ascending node | | |
| Saros | Map | Gamma | Saros | Map | Gamma |
| 120 | March 30, 2033 Total | 0.9778 | 125 | September 23, 2033 Partial | −1.1583 |
| 130 | March 20, 2034 Total | 0.2894 | 135 | September 12, 2034 Annular | −0.3936 |
| 140 | March 9, 2035 Annular | −0.4368 | 145 | September 2, 2035 Total | 0.3727 |
| 150 | February 27, 2036 Partial | −1.1942 | 155 | August 21, 2036 Partial | 1.0825 |

=== Saros 135 ===
This eclipse is a part of Saros series 135, repeating every 18 years, 11 days, and containing 71 events. The series started with a partial solar eclipse on July 5, 1331. It contains annular eclipses from October 21, 1511 through February 24, 2305; hybrid eclipses on March 8, 2323 and March 18, 2341; and total eclipses from March 29, 2359 through May 22, 2449. The series ends at member 71 as a partial eclipse on August 17, 2593. Its eclipses are tabulated in three columns; every third eclipse in the same column is one exeligmos apart, so they all cast shadows over approximately the same parts of the Earth.

The longest duration of annularity was produced by member 16 at 10 minutes, 41 seconds on December 24, 1601, and the longest duration of totality will be produced by member 62 at 2 minutes, 27 seconds on May 12, 2431. All eclipses in this series occur at the Moon’s ascending node of orbit.

Series members 28–49 occur between 1801 and 2200:
| 28 | 29 | 30 |
|---|---|---|
| May 5, 1818 | May 15, 1836 | May 26, 1854 |
| 31 | 32 | 33 |
| June 6, 1872 | June 17, 1890 | June 28, 1908 |
| 34 | 35 | 36 |
| July 9, 1926 | July 20, 1944 | July 31, 1962 |
| 37 | 38 | 39 |
| August 10, 1980 | August 22, 1998 | September 1, 2016 |
| 40 | 42 | 42 |
| September 12, 2034 | September 22, 2052 | October 4, 2070 |
| 43 | 44 | 45 |
| October 14, 2088 | October 26, 2106 | November 6, 2124 |
| 46 | 47 | 48 |
| November 17, 2142 | November 27, 2160 | December 9, 2178 |
49
December 19, 2196

=== Metonic series ===
The metonic series repeats eclipses every 19 years (6939.69 days), lasting about 5 cycles. Eclipses occur in nearly the same calendar date. In addition, the octon subseries repeats 1/5 of that or every 3.8 years (1387.94 days). All eclipses in this table occur at the Moon's ascending node.

21 eclipse events between July 1, 2000 and July 1, 2076
| July 1–2 | April 19–20 | February 5–7 | November 24–25 | September 12–13 |
| 117 | 119 | 121 | 123 | 125 |
|---|---|---|---|---|
| July 1, 2000 | April 19, 2004 | February 7, 2008 | November 25, 2011 | September 13, 2015 |
| 127 | 129 | 131 | 133 | 135 |
| July 2, 2019 | April 20, 2023 | February 6, 2027 | November 25, 2030 | September 12, 2034 |
| 137 | 139 | 141 | 143 | 145 |
| July 2, 2038 | April 20, 2042 | February 5, 2046 | November 25, 2049 | September 12, 2053 |
| 147 | 149 | 151 | 153 | 155 |
| July 1, 2057 | April 20, 2061 | February 5, 2065 | November 24, 2068 | September 12, 2072 |
157
July 1, 2076

=== Tritos series ===
This eclipse is a part of a tritos cycle, repeating at alternating nodes every 135 synodic months (≈ 3986.63 days, or 11 years minus 1 month). Their appearance and longitude are irregular due to a lack of synchronization with the anomalistic month (period of perigee), but groupings of 3 tritos cycles (≈ 33 years minus 3 months) come close (≈ 434.044 anomalistic months), so eclipses are similar in these groupings.

Series members between 1801 and 2200
| June 26, 1805 (Saros 114) | May 27, 1816 (Saros 115) | April 26, 1827 (Saros 116) | March 25, 1838 (Saros 117) | February 23, 1849 (Saros 118) |
| January 23, 1860 (Saros 119) | December 22, 1870 (Saros 120) | November 21, 1881 (Saros 121) | October 20, 1892 (Saros 122) | September 21, 1903 (Saros 123) |
| August 21, 1914 (Saros 124) | July 20, 1925 (Saros 125) | June 19, 1936 (Saros 126) | May 20, 1947 (Saros 127) | April 19, 1958 (Saros 128) |
| March 18, 1969 (Saros 129) | February 16, 1980 (Saros 130) | January 15, 1991 (Saros 131) | December 14, 2001 (Saros 132) | November 13, 2012 (Saros 133) |
| October 14, 2023 (Saros 134) | September 12, 2034 (Saros 135) | August 12, 2045 (Saros 136) | July 12, 2056 (Saros 137) | June 11, 2067 (Saros 138) |
| May 11, 2078 (Saros 139) | April 10, 2089 (Saros 140) | March 10, 2100 (Saros 141) | February 8, 2111 (Saros 142) | January 8, 2122 (Saros 143) |
| December 7, 2132 (Saros 144) | November 7, 2143 (Saros 145) | October 7, 2154 (Saros 146) | September 5, 2165 (Saros 147) | August 4, 2176 (Saros 148) |
| July 6, 2187 (Saros 149) | June 4, 2198 (Saros 150) | | | |

=== Inex series ===
This eclipse is a part of the long period inex cycle, repeating at alternating nodes, every 358 synodic months (≈ 10,571.95 days, or 29 years minus 20 days). Their appearance and longitude are irregular due to a lack of synchronization with the anomalistic month (period of perigee). However, groupings of 3 inex cycles (≈ 87 years minus 2 months) comes close (≈ 1,151.02 anomalistic months), so eclipses are similar in these groupings.

Series members between 1801 and 2200
| February 21, 1803 (Saros 127) | February 1, 1832 (Saros 128) | January 11, 1861 (Saros 129) |
| December 22, 1889 (Saros 130) | December 3, 1918 (Saros 131) | November 12, 1947 (Saros 132) |
| October 23, 1976 (Saros 133) | October 3, 2005 (Saros 134) | September 12, 2034 (Saros 135) |
| August 24, 2063 (Saros 136) | August 3, 2092 (Saros 137) | July 14, 2121 (Saros 138) |
| June 25, 2150 (Saros 139) | June 5, 2179 (Saros 140) | |
