= Solar eclipse of December 5, 2029 =

Future partial solar eclipse

- Partial eclipse
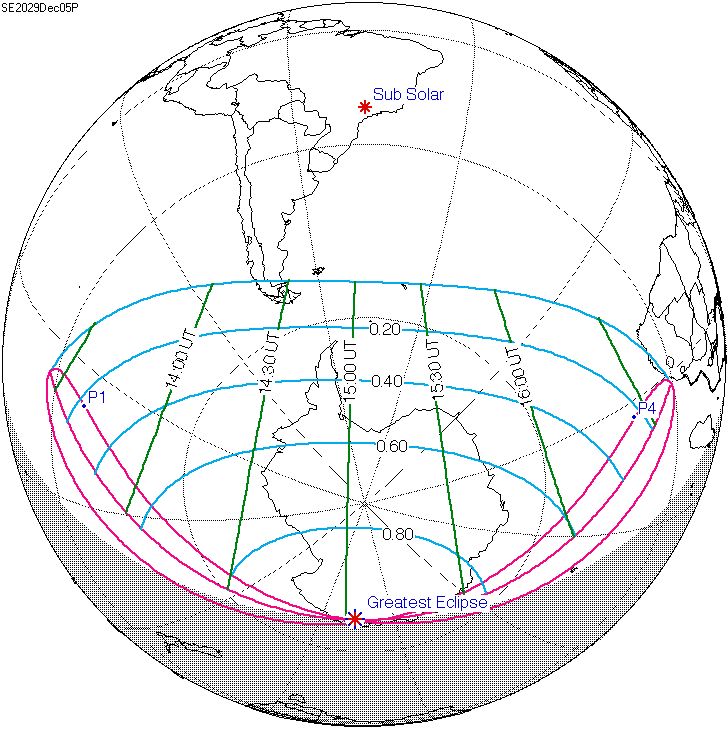
- Map
- Gamma: −1.0609
- Magnitude: 0.8911

Maximum eclipse
- Coordinates: 67.5°S 135.7°E

Times (UTC)
- Greatest eclipse: 15:03:58

References
- Saros: 123 (54 of 70)
- Catalog # (SE5000): 9574

A partial solar eclipse will occur at the Moon's ascending node of orbit on Wednesday, December 5, 2029, with a magnitude of 0.8911. A solar eclipse occurs when the Moon passes between Earth and the Sun, thereby totally or partly obscuring the image of the Sun for a viewer on Earth. A partial solar eclipse occurs in the polar regions of the Earth when the center of the Moon's shadow misses the Earth.

This will be the last of four partial solar eclipses in 2029, with the others occurring on January 14, June 12, and July 11.

A partial eclipse will be visible for parts of extreme southern Chile and Argentina and much of Antarctica.

== Images ==
Animated path

== Eclipse timing ==
=== Places experiencing partial eclipse ===
Solar Eclipse of December 5, 2029 (Local Times)
Country or territory	City or place	Start of partial eclipse	Maximum eclipse	End of partial eclipse	Duration of eclipse (hr:min)	Maximum coverage
Chile	Punta Arenas	11:05:49	11:27:04	11:48:44	0:43	1.12%
Argentina	Río Grande	11:11:03	11:32:15	11:53:49	0:43	1.07%
Argentina	Ushuaia	11:05:46	11:32:43	12:00:14	0:54	2.33%
Chile	Puerto Williams	11:06:50	11:33:49	12:01:21	0:55	2.32%
Antarctica	Rothera Research Station	10:56:06	11:47:13	12:39:23	1:43	26.06%
Antarctica	Palmer Station	10:59:53	11:48:13	12:37:28	1:38	19.01%
Antarctica	San Martín Base	10:57:04	11:48:35	12:41:05	1:44	27.01%
Antarctica	Zucchelli Station (Note: The times listed for this location occur on December 6, 2029, local time.)	03:01:47	03:51:44	04:42:14	1:40	82.73%
Antarctica	Carlini Base	11:07:38	11:52:00	12:36:58	1:29	12.59%
Antarctica	McMurdo Station	03:02:33	03:53:28	04:44:54	1:42	80.84%
Antarctica	Esperanza Base	11:08:28	11:54:34	12:41:12	1:33	14.70%
Antarctica	Marambio Base	11:08:07	11:55:25	12:43:13	1:35	16.42%
Antarctica	Orcadas Base	11:28:09	12:08:49	12:49:20	1:21	8.51%
Antarctica	Concordia Station	22:18:53	23:08:48	23:58:36	1:40	84.46%
Antarctica	Belgrano II Base	11:15:34	12:11:02	13:06:09	1:51	46.65%
Antarctica	Vostok Station	20:22:14	21:13:29	22:04:23	1:42	80.83%
Antarctica	Casey Station	22:30:35	23:18:15	23:42:28 (sunset)	1:12	84.24%
South Georgia and the South Sandwich Islands	King Edward Point	13:13:39	13:23:26	13:33:11	0:20	0.09%
Antarctica	Dumont d'Urville Station	00:12:50	01:23:48	01:47:36	1:35	38.86%
Antarctica	Neumayer Station III	14:37:36	15:31:24	16:23:43	1:46	37.00%
Antarctica	Davis Station	21:43:35	22:33:24	23:22:08	1:39	75.02%
Antarctica	Troll	14:39:27	15:33:37	16:26:13	1:47	43.48%
Antarctica	Mawson Station	19:49:56	20:40:23	21:29:26	1:40	67.94%
Bouvet Island	Bouvet Island	16:24:03	17:04:45	17:43:36	1:20	13.04%
French Southern and Antarctic Lands	Île de la Possession	20:29:40	21:08:45	21:12:32 (sunset)	0:43	35.23%
South Africa	Marion Island	18:36:31	19:17:35	19:56:47	1:20	25.77%
South Africa	Gqeberha	18:28:22	18:37:39	18:46:48	0:18	0.24%
South Africa	Port Alfred	18:27:09	18:37:40	18:48:02	0:21	0.35%
South Africa	East London	18:28:11	18:37:58	18:47:37	0:19	0.29%
South Africa	Makhanda	18:30:30	18:38:06	18:45:37	0:15	0.13%

== Eclipse details ==
Shown below are two tables displaying details about this particular solar eclipse. The first table outlines times at which the Moon's penumbra or umbra attains the specific parameter, and the second table describes various other parameters pertaining to this eclipse.

December 5, 2029 Solar Eclipse Times
Event	Time (UTC)
First Penumbral External Contact	2029 December 5 at 13:07:52.5 UTC
Ecliptic Conjunction	2029 December 5 at 14:53:17.6 UTC
Greatest Eclipse	2029 December 5 at 15:03:58.0 UTC
Equatorial Conjunction	2029 December 5 at 15:06:38.6 UTC
Last Penumbral External Contact	2029 December 5 at 17:00:04.9 UTC

December 5, 2029 Solar Eclipse Parameters
Parameter	Value
Eclipse Magnitude	0.89107
Eclipse Obscuration	0.86718
Gamma	−1.06090
Sun Right Ascension	16h49m34.2s
Sun Declination	-22°26'54.3"
Sun Semi-Diameter	16'13.8"
Sun Equatorial Horizontal Parallax	08.9"
Moon Right Ascension	16h49m27.4s
Moon Declination	-23°31'15.0"
Moon Semi-Diameter	16'34.3"
Moon Equatorial Horizontal Parallax	1°00'49.1"
ΔT	73.8 s

== Eclipse season ==
This eclipse is part of an eclipse season, a period, roughly every six months, when eclipses occur. Only two (or occasionally three) eclipse seasons occur each year, and each season lasts about 35 days and repeats just short of six months (173 days) later; thus two full eclipse seasons always occur each year. Either two or three eclipses happen each eclipse season. In the sequence below, each eclipse is separated by a fortnight.

Eclipse season of December 2029
December 5 Ascending node (new moon)	December 20 Descending node (full moon)
Partial solar eclipse Solar Saros 123	Total lunar eclipse Lunar Saros 135

== Related eclipses ==
=== Eclipses in 2029 ===
- A partial solar eclipse on January 14.
- A partial solar eclipse on June 12.
- A total lunar eclipse on June 26.
- A partial solar eclipse on July 11.
- A partial solar eclipse on December 5.
- A total lunar eclipse on December 20.

=== Metonic ===
- Preceded by: Solar eclipse of February 17, 2026
- Followed by: Solar eclipse of September 23, 2033

=== Tzolkinex ===
- Preceded by: Solar eclipse of October 25, 2022
- Followed by: Solar eclipse of January 16, 2037

=== Half-Saros ===
- Preceded by: Lunar eclipse of November 30, 2020
- Followed by: Lunar eclipse of December 11, 2038

=== Tritos ===
- Preceded by: Solar eclipse of January 6, 2019
- Followed by: Solar eclipse of November 4, 2040

=== Solar Saros 123 ===
- Preceded by: Solar eclipse of November 25, 2011
- Followed by: Solar eclipse of December 16, 2047

=== Inex ===
- Preceded by: Solar eclipse of December 25, 2000
- Followed by: Solar eclipse of November 16, 2058

=== Triad ===
- Preceded by: Solar eclipse of February 4, 1943
- Followed by: Solar eclipse of October 6, 2116

=== Solar eclipses of 2029–2032 ===
This eclipse is a member of a semester series. An eclipse in a semester series of solar eclipses repeats approximately every 177 days and 4 hours (a semester) at alternating nodes of the Moon's orbit.

The partial solar eclipses on January 14, 2029 and July 11, 2029 occur in the previous lunar year eclipse set.

Solar eclipse series sets from 2029 to 2032
Descending node			Ascending node		
Saros	Map	Gamma	Saros	Map	Gamma
118	June 12, 2029 Partial	1.29431	123	December 5, 2029 Partial	−1.06090
128	June 1, 2030 Annular	0.56265	133	November 25, 2030 Total	−0.38669
138	May 21, 2031 Annular	−0.19699	143	November 14, 2031 Hybrid	0.30776
148	May 9, 2032 Annular	−0.93748	153	November 3, 2032 Partial	1.06431

=== Saros 123 ===
This eclipse is a part of Saros series 123, repeating every 18 years, 11 days, and containing 70 events. The series started with a partial solar eclipse on April 29, 1074. It contains annular eclipses from July 2, 1182 through April 19, 1651; hybrid eclipses from April 30, 1669 through May 22, 1705; and total eclipses from June 3, 1723 through October 23, 1957. The series ends at member 70 as a partial eclipse on May 31, 2318. Its eclipses are tabulated in three columns; every third eclipse in the same column is one exeligmos apart, so they all cast shadows over approximately the same parts of the Earth.

The longest duration of annularity was produced by member 19 at 8 minutes, 7 seconds on November 9, 1398, and the longest duration of totality was produced by member 42 at 3 minutes, 27 seconds on July 27, 1813. All eclipses in this series occur at the Moon’s ascending node of orbit.

Series members 42–63 occur between 1801 and 2200:
42	43	44
July 27, 1813	August 7, 1831	August 18, 1849
45	46	47
August 29, 1867	September 8, 1885	September 21, 1903
48	49	50
October 1, 1921	October 12, 1939	October 23, 1957
51	52	53
November 3, 1975	November 13, 1993	November 25, 2011
54	55	56
December 5, 2029	December 16, 2047	December 27, 2065
57	58	59
January 7, 2084	January 19, 2102	January 30, 2120
60	61	62
February 9, 2138	February 21, 2156	March 3, 2174
63
March 13, 2192

=== Metonic series ===
The metonic series repeats eclipses every 19 years (6939.69 days), lasting about 5 cycles. Eclipses occur in nearly the same calendar date. In addition, the octon subseries repeats 1/5 of that or every 3.8 years (1387.94 days). All eclipses in this table occur at the Moon's ascending node.

21 eclipse events between July 13, 2018 and July 12, 2094
July 12–13	April 30–May 1	February 16–17	December 5–6	September 22–23
117	119	121	123	125
July 13, 2018	April 30, 2022	February 17, 2026	December 5, 2029	September 23, 2033
127	129	131	133	135
July 13, 2037	April 30, 2041	February 16, 2045	December 5, 2048	September 22, 2052
137	139	141	143	145
July 12, 2056	April 30, 2060	February 17, 2064	December 6, 2067	September 23, 2071
147	149	151	153	155
July 13, 2075	May 1, 2079	February 16, 2083	December 6, 2086	September 23, 2090
157
July 12, 2094

=== Tritos series ===
This eclipse is a part of a tritos cycle, repeating at alternating nodes every 135 synodic months (≈ 3986.63 days, or 11 years minus 1 month). Their appearance and longitude are irregular due to a lack of synchronization with the anomalistic month (period of perigee), but groupings of 3 tritos cycles (≈ 33 years minus 3 months) come close (≈ 434.044 anomalistic months), so eclipses are similar in these groupings.

Series members between 1866 and 2200
March 16, 1866 (Saros 108)			December 13, 1898 (Saros 111)	
	September 12, 1931 (Saros 114)	August 12, 1942 (Saros 115)	July 11, 1953 (Saros 116)	June 10, 1964 (Saros 117)
May 11, 1975 (Saros 118)	April 9, 1986 (Saros 119)	March 9, 1997 (Saros 120)	February 7, 2008 (Saros 121)	January 6, 2019 (Saros 122)
December 5, 2029 (Saros 123)	November 4, 2040 (Saros 124)	October 4, 2051 (Saros 125)	September 3, 2062 (Saros 126)	August 3, 2073 (Saros 127)
July 3, 2084 (Saros 128)	June 2, 2095 (Saros 129)	May 3, 2106 (Saros 130)	April 2, 2117 (Saros 131)	March 1, 2128 (Saros 132)
January 30, 2139 (Saros 133)	December 30, 2149 (Saros 134)	November 27, 2160 (Saros 135)	October 29, 2171 (Saros 136)	September 27, 2182 (Saros 137)
August 26, 2193 (Saros 138)

=== Inex series ===
This eclipse is a part of the long period inex cycle, repeating at alternating nodes, every 358 synodic months (≈ 10,571.95 days, or 29 years minus 20 days). Their appearance and longitude are irregular due to a lack of synchronization with the anomalistic month (period of perigee). However, groupings of 3 inex cycles (≈ 87 years minus 2 months) comes close (≈ 1,151.02 anomalistic months), so eclipses are similar in these groupings.

Series members between 1801 and 2200
April 26, 1827 (Saros 116)	April 5, 1856 (Saros 117)	March 16, 1885 (Saros 118)
February 25, 1914 (Saros 119)	February 4, 1943 (Saros 120)	January 16, 1972 (Saros 121)
December 25, 2000 (Saros 122)	December 5, 2029 (Saros 123)	November 16, 2058 (Saros 124)
October 26, 2087 (Saros 125)	October 6, 2116 (Saros 126)	September 16, 2145 (Saros 127)
August 27, 2174 (Saros 128)		
