= Solar eclipse of November 25, 2011 =

21st-century partial solar eclipse

- Partial eclipse
- Hinode/XRT footage of the eclipse
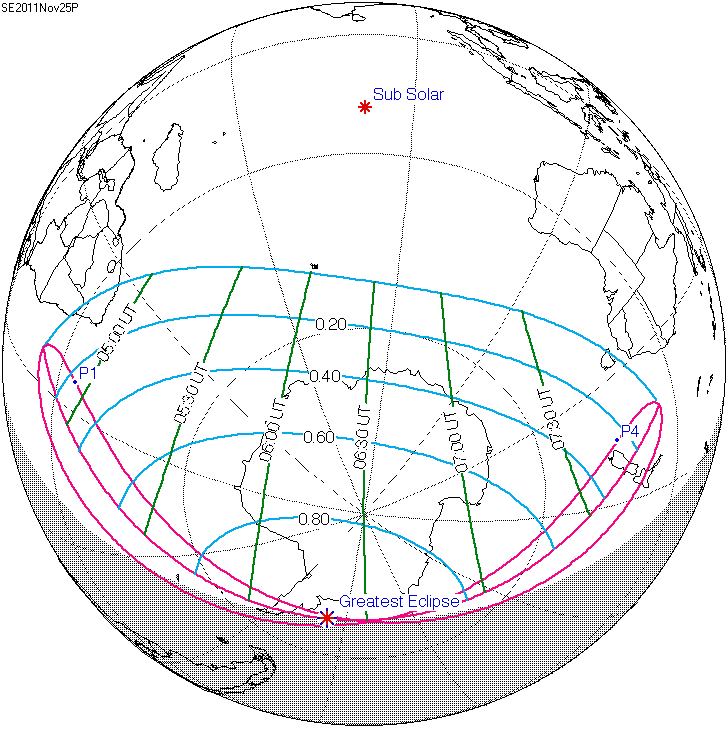
- Map
- Gamma: −1.0536
- Magnitude: 0.9047

Maximum eclipse
- Coordinates: 68.6°S 82.4°W

Times (UTC)
- (P1) Partial begin: 4:23:14
- Greatest eclipse: 6:21:24
- (P4) Partial end: 8:17:16

References
- Saros: 123 (53 of 70)
- Catalog # (SE5000): 9534

A partial solar eclipse occurred at the Moon’s ascending node of orbit on Friday, November 25, 2011, with a magnitude of 0.9047. A solar eclipse occurs when the Moon passes between Earth and the Sun, thereby totally or partly obscuring the image of the Sun for a viewer on Earth. A partial solar eclipse occurs in the polar regions of the Earth when the center of the Moon's shadow misses the Earth.

This was the last of four partial solar eclipses in 2011, with the others occurring on January 4, June 1, and July 1.

This eclipse was visible across Antarctica in its summer 24-hour day sunlight, and New Zealand at sunset with less than 20% of the Sun obscured. Parts of the western Antarctic Peninsula experienced nearly 90% obscuration of the Sun, while South Africa and Tasmania experienced a very small partial eclipse.

== Images ==
Animated path

== Eclipse timing ==
=== Places experiencing partial eclipse ===
Solar Eclipse of November 25, 2011 (Local Times)
Country or territory	City or place	Start of partial eclipse	Maximum eclipse	End of partial eclipse	Duration of eclipse (hr:min)	Maximum coverage
South Africa	Makhanda	06:44:13	06:51:55	06:59:44	0:16	0.10%
South Africa	George	06:32:26	06:52:33	07:13:19	0:41	2.01%
South Africa	Stellenbosch	06:28:24	06:52:34	07:17:41	0:49	3.86%
South Africa	Cape Town	06:28:01	06:52:35	07:18:06	0:50	4.09%
South Africa	Knysna	06:33:09	06:52:41	07:12:49	0:40	1.81%
South Africa	Gqeberha	06:38:06	06:52:46	07:07:48	0:30	0.71%
South Africa	Marion Island	07:43:25	08:19:04	08:56:34	1:13	8.54%
Bouvet Island	Bouvet Island	05:37:27	06:25:32	07:16:14	1:39	47.48%
Saint Helena, Ascension and Tristan da Cunha	Edinburgh of the Seven Seas	05:25:07 (sunrise)	05:28:25	05:47:48	0:23	17.01%
French Southern and Antarctic Lands	Île de la Possession	10:12:00	10:30:14	10:48:54	0:37	0.75%
Antarctica	Orcadas Base	02:46:16 (sunrise)	02:52:50	03:41:11	0:55	80.30%
Antarctica	Troll	05:03:12	05:56:34	06:51:41	1:48	66.79%
Antarctica	Marambio Base	02:53:46 (sunrise)	03:02:45	03:51:15	0:57	85.22%
South Georgia and the South Sandwich Islands	King Edward Point	03:58:56 (sunrise)	04:03:39	04:28:25	0:29	37.06%
Antarctica	Mawson Station	10:18:16	11:12:24	12:07:38	1:49	32.18%
Antarctica	Esperanza Base	03:06:37 (sunrise)	03:14:48	03:50:29	0:44	64.57%
Antarctica	Palmer Station	03:15:23 (sunrise)	03:24:59	03:55:37	0:40	53.51%
Antarctica	Davis Station	10:31:23	11:25:36	12:20:06	1:49	30.41%
Antarctica	Carlini Base	03:26:54 (sunrise)	03:34:16	03:50:05	0:23	21.11%
Antarctica	Concordia Station	16:54:24	17:49:49	18:44:04	1:50	47.36%
Antarctica	McMurdo Station	18:58:15	19:52:13	20:45:04	1:47	63.49%
Antarctica	Casey Station	17:02:36	17:54:22	18:44:45	1:42	25.69%
New Zealand	Chatham Islands	20:42:59	20:45:56	20:48:56 (sunset)	0:06	1.14%
New Zealand	Napier	20:12:30	20:14:31	20:16:33 (sunset)	0:04	0.48%
New Zealand	Palmerston North	20:11:43	20:21:00	20:24:13 (sunset)	0:13	4.23%
New Zealand	Wellington	20:10:19	20:26:59	20:30:15 (sunset)	0:20	8.98%
Australia	Macquarie Island	17:47:51	18:31:44	19:13:37	1:26	26.07%
New Zealand	Dunedin	20:03:07	20:40:35	21:02:06 (sunset)	0:59	19.44%
New Zealand	Christchurch	20:06:56	20:42:15	20:45:41 (sunset)	0:39	16.96%
Australia	Hobart	18:30:08	18:49:08	19:07:37	0:37	1.59%

== Eclipse details ==
Shown below are two tables displaying details about this particular solar eclipse. The first table outlines times at which the Moon's penumbra or umbra attains the specific parameter, and the second table describes various other parameters pertaining to this eclipse.

November 25, 2011 Solar Eclipse Times
Event	Time (UTC)
First Penumbral External Contact	2011 November 25 at 04:24:22.8 UTC
Ecliptic Conjunction	2011 November 25 at 06:10:47.5 UTC
Greatest Eclipse	2011 November 25 at 06:21:24.5 UTC
Equatorial Conjunction	2011 November 25 at 06:32:28.3 UTC
Last Penumbral External Contact	2011 November 25 at 08:18:24.1 UTC

November 25, 2011 Solar Eclipse Parameters
Parameter	Value
Eclipse Magnitude	0.90468
Eclipse Obscuration	0.88451
Gamma	−1.05359
Sun Right Ascension	16h02m13.7s
Sun Declination	-20°40'56.2"
Sun Semi-Diameter	16'12.1"
Sun Equatorial Horizontal Parallax	08.9"
Moon Right Ascension	16h01m46.2s
Moon Declination	-21°44'25.4"
Moon Semi-Diameter	16'32.6"
Moon Equatorial Horizontal Parallax	1°00'42.7"
ΔT	66.5 s

== Eclipse season ==
This eclipse is part of an eclipse season, a period, roughly every six months, when eclipses occur. Only two (or occasionally three) eclipse seasons occur each year, and each season lasts about 35 days and repeats just short of six months (173 days) later; thus two full eclipse seasons always occur each year. Either two or three eclipses happen each eclipse season. In the sequence below, each eclipse is separated by a fortnight.

Eclipse season of November–December 2011
November 25 Ascending node (new moon)	December 10 Descending node (full moon)
Partial solar eclipse Solar Saros 123	Total lunar eclipse Lunar Saros 135

== Related eclipses ==
=== Eclipses in 2011 ===
- A partial solar eclipse on January 4.
- A partial solar eclipse on June 1.
- A total lunar eclipse on June 15.
- A partial solar eclipse on July 1.
- A partial solar eclipse on November 25.
- A total lunar eclipse on December 10.

=== Metonic ===
- Preceded by: Solar eclipse of February 7, 2008
- Followed by: Solar eclipse of September 13, 2015

=== Tzolkinex ===
- Preceded by: Solar eclipse of October 14, 2004
- Followed by: Solar eclipse of January 6, 2019

=== Half-Saros ===
- Preceded by: Lunar eclipse of November 20, 2002
- Followed by: Lunar eclipse of November 30, 2020

=== Tritos ===
- Preceded by: Solar eclipse of December 25, 2000
- Followed by: Solar eclipse of October 25, 2022

=== Solar Saros 123 ===
- Preceded by: Solar eclipse of November 13, 1993
- Followed by: Solar eclipse of December 5, 2029

=== Inex ===
- Preceded by: Solar eclipse of December 15, 1982
- Followed by: Solar eclipse of November 4, 2040

=== Triad ===
- Preceded by: Solar eclipse of January 24, 1925
- Followed by: Solar eclipse of September 25, 2098

=== Solar eclipses of 2011–2014 ===
This eclipse is a member of a semester series. An eclipse in a semester series of solar eclipses repeats approximately every 177 days and 4 hours (a semester) at alternating nodes of the Moon's orbit.

The partial solar eclipses on January 4, 2011 and July 1, 2011 occur in the previous lunar year eclipse set.

Solar eclipse series sets from 2011 to 2014
Descending node			Ascending node		
Saros	Map	Gamma	Saros	Map	Gamma
118 Partial in Tromsø, Norway	June 1, 2011 Partial	1.21300	123 Hinode XRT footage	November 25, 2011 Partial	−1.05359
128 Annularity in Red Bluff, CA, USA	May 20, 2012 Annular	0.48279	133 Totality in Mount Carbine, Queensland, Australia	November 13, 2012 Total	−0.37189
138 Annularity in Churchills Head, Australia	May 10, 2013 Annular	−0.26937	143 Partial in Libreville, Gabon	November 3, 2013 Hybrid	0.32715
148 Partial in Adelaide, Australia	April 29, 2014 Annular (non-central)	−0.99996	153 Partial in Minneapolis, MN, USA	October 23, 2014 Partial	1.09078

=== Saros 123 ===
This eclipse is a part of Saros series 123, repeating every 18 years, 11 days, and containing 70 events. The series started with a partial solar eclipse on April 29, 1074. It contains annular eclipses from July 2, 1182 through April 19, 1651; hybrid eclipses from April 30, 1669 through May 22, 1705; and total eclipses from June 3, 1723 through October 23, 1957. The series ends at member 70 as a partial eclipse on May 31, 2318. Its eclipses are tabulated in three columns; every third eclipse in the same column is one exeligmos apart, so they all cast shadows over approximately the same parts of the Earth.

The longest duration of annularity was produced by member 19 at 8 minutes, 7 seconds on November 9, 1398, and the longest duration of totality was produced by member 42 at 3 minutes, 27 seconds on July 27, 1813. All eclipses in this series occur at the Moon’s ascending node of orbit.

Series members 42–63 occur between 1801 and 2200:
42	43	44
July 27, 1813	August 7, 1831	August 18, 1849
45	46	47
August 29, 1867	September 8, 1885	September 21, 1903
48	49	50
October 1, 1921	October 12, 1939	October 23, 1957
51	52	53
November 3, 1975	November 13, 1993	November 25, 2011
54	55	56
December 5, 2029	December 16, 2047	December 27, 2065
57	58	59
January 7, 2084	January 19, 2102	January 30, 2120
60	61	62
February 9, 2138	February 21, 2156	March 3, 2174
63
March 13, 2192

=== Metonic series ===
The metonic series repeats eclipses every 19 years (6939.69 days), lasting about 5 cycles. Eclipses occur in nearly the same calendar date. In addition, the octon subseries repeats 1/5 of that or every 3.8 years (1387.94 days). All eclipses in this table occur at the Moon's ascending node.

21 eclipse events between July 1, 2000 and July 1, 2076
July 1–2	April 19–20	February 5–7	November 24–25	September 12–13
117	119	121	123	125
July 1, 2000	April 19, 2004	February 7, 2008	November 25, 2011	September 13, 2015
127	129	131	133	135
July 2, 2019	April 20, 2023	February 6, 2027	November 25, 2030	September 12, 2034
137	139	141	143	145
July 2, 2038	April 20, 2042	February 5, 2046	November 25, 2049	September 12, 2053
147	149	151	153	155
July 1, 2057	April 20, 2061	February 5, 2065	November 24, 2068	September 12, 2072
157
July 1, 2076

=== Tritos series ===
This eclipse is a part of a tritos cycle, repeating at alternating nodes every 135 synodic months (≈ 3986.63 days, or 11 years minus 1 month). Their appearance and longitude are irregular due to a lack of synchronization with the anomalistic month (period of perigee), but groupings of 3 tritos cycles (≈ 33 years minus 3 months) come close (≈ 434.044 anomalistic months), so eclipses are similar in these groupings.

Series members between 1837 and 2200
April 5, 1837 (Saros 107)	March 5, 1848 (Saros 108)	February 3, 1859 (Saros 109)		December 2, 1880 (Saros 111)
		August 31, 1913 (Saros 114)	July 31, 1924 (Saros 115)	June 30, 1935 (Saros 116)
May 30, 1946 (Saros 117)	April 30, 1957 (Saros 118)	March 28, 1968 (Saros 119)	February 26, 1979 (Saros 120)	January 26, 1990 (Saros 121)
December 25, 2000 (Saros 122)	November 25, 2011 (Saros 123)	October 25, 2022 (Saros 124)	September 23, 2033 (Saros 125)	August 23, 2044 (Saros 126)
July 24, 2055 (Saros 127)	June 22, 2066 (Saros 128)	May 22, 2077 (Saros 129)	April 21, 2088 (Saros 130)	March 21, 2099 (Saros 131)
February 18, 2110 (Saros 132)	January 19, 2121 (Saros 133)	December 19, 2131 (Saros 134)	November 17, 2142 (Saros 135)	October 17, 2153 (Saros 136)
September 16, 2164 (Saros 137)	August 16, 2175 (Saros 138)	July 16, 2186 (Saros 139)	June 15, 2197 (Saros 140)	

=== Inex series ===
This eclipse is a part of the long period inex cycle, repeating at alternating nodes, every 358 synodic months (≈ 10,571.95 days, or 29 years minus 20 days). Their appearance and longitude are irregular due to a lack of synchronization with the anomalistic month (period of perigee). However, groupings of 3 inex cycles (≈ 87 years minus 2 months) comes close (≈ 1,151.02 anomalistic months), so eclipses are similar in these groupings.

Series members between 1801 and 2200
April 14, 1809 (Saros 116)	March 25, 1838 (Saros 117)	March 6, 1867 (Saros 118)
February 13, 1896 (Saros 119)	January 24, 1925 (Saros 120)	January 5, 1954 (Saros 121)
December 15, 1982 (Saros 122)	November 25, 2011 (Saros 123)	November 4, 2040 (Saros 124)
October 15, 2069 (Saros 125)	September 25, 2098 (Saros 126)	September 6, 2127 (Saros 127)
August 16, 2156 (Saros 128)	July 26, 2185 (Saros 129)	
