= Solar eclipse of November 25, 2030 =

Total eclipse

- Total eclipse
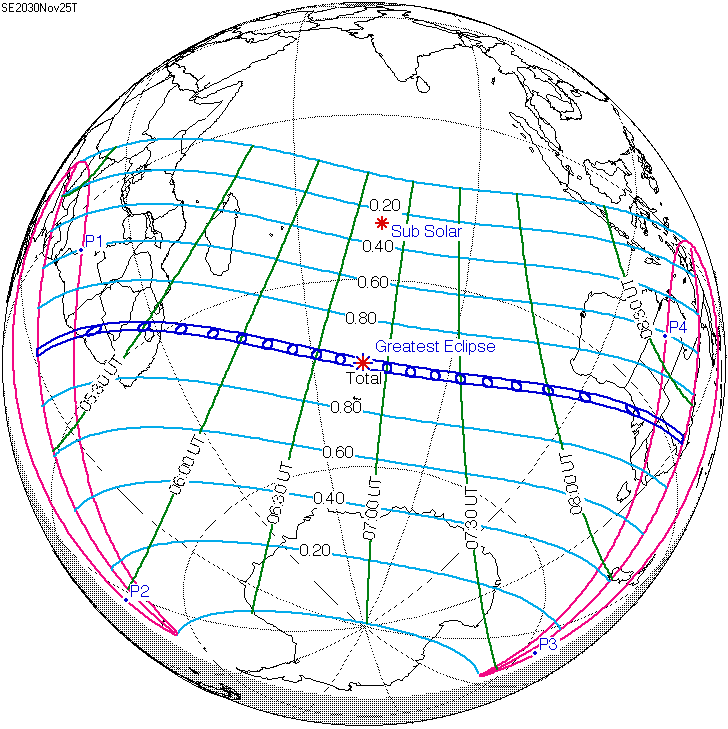
- Map
- Gamma: −0.3867
- Magnitude: 1.0468

Maximum eclipse
- Duration: 224 s (3 min 44 s)
- Coordinates: 43.6°S 71.2°E
- Max. width of band: 169 km (105 mi)

Times (UTC)
- Greatest eclipse: 6:51:37

References
- Saros: 133 (46 of 72)
- Catalog # (SE5000): 9576

A total solar eclipse will occur at the Moon's ascending node of orbit on Monday, November 25, 2030, with a magnitude of 1.0468. A solar eclipse occurs when the Moon passes between Earth and the Sun, thereby totally or partly obscuring the image of the Sun for a viewer on Earth. A total solar eclipse occurs when the Moon's apparent diameter is larger than the Sun's, blocking all direct sunlight, turning day into darkness. Totality occurs in a narrow path across Earth's surface, with the partial solar eclipse visible over a surrounding region thousands of kilometres wide. Occurring about 14 hours before perigee (on November 25, 2030, at 21:10 UTC), the Moon's apparent diameter will be larger.

Totality will be visible in Namibia, Botswana, South Africa, Lesotho, and Australia. A partial eclipse will be visible for much of Central and Southern Africa, Antarctica, Australia, and Indonesia.

== Path ==
The path of totality will begin in the Atlantic Ocean. It will then pass through Namibia (serving the capital Windhoek), Botswana (serving Tsabong), and South Africa (serving Durban; also visible in parts of Lesotho). After that, it will pass through the Indian Ocean, where it will terminate in Australia (visiting the states of South Australia, New South Wales, and Queensland).

== Images ==
Animated path

== Eclipse timing ==
=== Places experiencing total eclipse ===
Solar Eclipse of November 25, 2030 (Local Times)
Country or territory	City or place	Start of partial eclipse	Start of total eclipse	Maximum eclipse	End of total eclipse	End of partial eclipse	Duration of totality (min:s)	Duration of eclipse (hr:min)	Maximum magnitude
Namibia	Windhoek	06:24:23	07:18:54	07:19:51	07:20:47	08:21:22	1:53	1:57	1.0118
Botswana	Tsabong	06:27:16	07:24:44	07:25:13	07:25:44	08:29:52	1:00	2:03	1.0023
South Africa	Schweizer-Reneke	06:28:34	07:26:54	07:27:54	07:28:54	08:34:16	2:00	2:06	1.0094
South Africa	Phuthaditjhaba	06:30:28	07:30:18	07:31:32	07:32:47	08:40:01	2:29	2:10	1.0192
South Africa	Pietermaritzburg	06:32:05	07:32:49	07:34:00	07:35:10	08:43:26	2:21	2:11	1.0122
South Africa	Durban	06:32:33	07:33:34	07:34:47	07:36:00	08:44:37	2:26	2:12	1.0135

=== Places experiencing partial eclipse ===
Solar Eclipse of November 25, 2030 (Local Times)
Country or territory	City or place	Start of partial eclipse	Maximum eclipse	End of partial eclipse	Duration of eclipse (hr:min)	Maximum coverage
Republic of the Congo	Brazzaville	05:35:41 (sunrise)	06:04:19	06:55:42	1:20	43.36%
Democratic Republic of the Congo	Kinshasa	05:35:29 (sunrise)	06:04:22	06:55:48	1:20	43.52%
Burundi	Gitega	06:22:20	07:06:03	07:54:02	1:32	21.06%
Angola	Luanda	05:36:49 (sunrise)	06:07:21	07:02:18	1:25	61.69%
Gabon	Libreville	06:06:05 (sunrise)	06:11:00	06:49:36	0:44	33.42%
Angola	Lubango	05:26:01 (sunrise)	06:12:04	07:10:13	1:44	82.29%
Namibia	Rundu	06:20:01	07:15:21	08:16:57	1:57	83.08%
Zambia	Lusaka	06:19:12	07:15:29	08:18:42	2:00	61.18%
Malawi	Lilongwe	06:21:03	07:17:06	08:20:13	1:59	47.59%
São Tomé and Príncipe	São Tomé	05:16:54 (sunrise)	05:19:14	05:50:35	0:34	30.62%
Zimbabwe	Harare	06:21:10	07:19:32	08:25:22	2:04	64.77%
Namibia	Swakopmund	06:25:08	07:19:40	08:19:57	1:55	99.40%
Namibia	Walvis Bay	06:25:26	07:19:59	08:20:15	1:55	98.66%
Comoros	Moroni	07:30:14	08:23:09	09:22:32	1:52	25.80%
Botswana	Gaborone	06:25:43	07:24:57	08:31:21	2:06	95.70%
South Africa	Johannesburg	06:27:35	07:28:00	08:35:49	2:08	97.27%
Eswatini	Mbabane	06:28:17	07:30:03	08:39:38	2:11	92.93%
Mozambique	Maputo	06:28:16	07:30:34	08:40:53	2:13	89.50%
Lesotho	Maseru	06:31:21	07:31:50	08:39:30	2:08	98.62%
Madagascar	Antananarivo	07:34:41	08:37:13	09:48:14	2:14	41.47%
Madagascar	Toliara	07:32:22	08:37:52	09:52:20	2:20	62.50%
Saint Helena, Ascension and Tristan da Cunha	Jamestown	05:41:12 (sunrise)	05:43:38	06:09:22	0:28	38.64%
Réunion	Saint-Denis	08:47:30	09:53:33	11:07:49	2:20	36.06%
Mauritius	Port Louis	08:51:43	09:56:56	11:09:52	2:18	31.01%
French Southern and Antarctic Lands	Port-aux-Français	10:35:56	11:51:04	13:07:18	2:31	82.10%
French Southern and Antarctic Lands	Île Amsterdam	10:38:07	12:01:44	13:24:22	2:46	78.63%
Papua New Guinea	Port Moresby	17:50:02	18:13:56	18:16:16 (sunset)	0:26	22.99%
Australia	Melbourne	18:19:45	19:15:40	20:07:21	1:48	74.82%
Australia	Sydney	18:25:00	19:18:49	19:45:32 (sunset)	1:21	79.09%
Australia	Brisbane	17:30:26	18:21:46	18:24:25 (sunset)	0:54	94.64%

== Eclipse details ==
Shown below are two tables displaying details about this particular solar eclipse. The first table outlines times at which the Moon's penumbra or umbra attains the specific parameter, and the second table describes various other parameters pertaining to this eclipse.

November 25, 2030 Solar Eclipse Times
Event	Time (UTC)
First Penumbral External Contact	2030 November 25 at 04:17:55.5 UTC
First Umbral External Contact	2030 November 25 at 05:15:34.1 UTC
First Central Line	2030 November 25 at 05:16:26.9 UTC
First Umbral Internal Contact	2030 November 25 at 05:17:19.8 UTC
First Penumbral Internal Contact	2030 November 25 at 06:25:54.6 UTC
Ecliptic Conjunction	2030 November 25 at 06:47:39.2 UTC
Greatest Eclipse	2030 November 25 at 06:51:36.9 UTC
Greatest Duration	2030 November 25 at 06:53:10.2 UTC
Equatorial Conjunction	2030 November 25 at 06:55:25.4 UTC
Last Penumbral Internal Contact	2030 November 25 at 07:17:13.7 UTC
Last Umbral Internal Contact	2030 November 25 at 08:25:50.4 UTC
Last Central Line	2030 November 25 at 08:26:44.0 UTC
Last Umbral External Contact	2030 November 25 at 08:27:37.6 UTC
Last Penumbral External Contact	2030 November 25 at 09:25:15.0 UTC

November 25, 2030 Solar Eclipse Parameters
Parameter	Value
Eclipse Magnitude	1.04684
Eclipse Obscuration	1.09588
Gamma	−0.38669
Sun Right Ascension	16h03m58.7s
Sun Declination	-20°45'39.0"
Sun Semi-Diameter	16'12.1"
Sun Equatorial Horizontal Parallax	08.9"
Moon Right Ascension	16h03m49.1s
Moon Declination	-21°09'10.6"
Moon Semi-Diameter	16'41.7"
Moon Equatorial Horizontal Parallax	1°01'16.4"
ΔT	74.2 s

== Eclipse season ==
This eclipse is part of an eclipse season, a period, roughly every six months, when eclipses occur. Only two (or occasionally three) eclipse seasons occur each year, and each season lasts about 35 days and repeats just short of six months (173 days) later; thus two full eclipse seasons always occur each year. Either two or three eclipses happen each eclipse season. In the sequence below, each eclipse is separated by a fortnight.

Eclipse season of November–December 2030
November 25 Ascending node (new moon)	December 9 Descending node (full moon)
Total solar eclipse Solar Saros 133	Penumbral lunar eclipse Lunar Saros 145

== Related eclipses ==
=== Eclipses in 2030 ===
- An annular solar eclipse on June 1.
- A partial lunar eclipse on June 15.
- A total solar eclipse on November 25.
- A penumbral lunar eclipse on December 9.

=== Metonic ===
- Preceded by: Solar eclipse of February 6, 2027
- Followed by: Solar eclipse of September 12, 2034

=== Tzolkinex ===
- Preceded by: Solar eclipse of October 14, 2023
- Followed by: Solar eclipse of January 5, 2038

=== Half-Saros ===
- Preceded by: Lunar eclipse of November 19, 2021
- Followed by: Lunar eclipse of November 30, 2039

=== Tritos ===
- Preceded by: Solar eclipse of December 26, 2019
- Followed by: Solar eclipse of October 25, 2041

=== Solar Saros 133 ===
- Preceded by: Solar eclipse of November 13, 2012
- Followed by: Solar eclipse of December 5, 2048

=== Inex ===
- Preceded by: Solar eclipse of December 14, 2001
- Followed by: Solar eclipse of November 5, 2059

=== Triad ===
- Preceded by: Solar eclipse of January 25, 1944
- Followed by: Solar eclipse of September 26, 2117

=== Solar eclipses of 2029–2032 ===
This eclipse is a member of a semester series. An eclipse in a semester series of solar eclipses repeats approximately every 177 days and 4 hours (a semester) at alternating nodes of the Moon's orbit.

The partial solar eclipses on January 14, 2029 and July 11, 2029 occur in the previous lunar year eclipse set.

Solar eclipse series sets from 2029 to 2032
Descending node			Ascending node		
Saros	Map	Gamma	Saros	Map	Gamma
118	June 12, 2029 Partial	1.29431	123	December 5, 2029 Partial	−1.06090
128	June 1, 2030 Annular	0.56265	133	November 25, 2030 Total	−0.38669
138	May 21, 2031 Annular	−0.19699	143	November 14, 2031 Hybrid	0.30776
148	May 9, 2032 Annular	−0.93748	153	November 3, 2032 Partial	1.06431

=== Saros 133 ===
This eclipse is a part of Saros series 133, repeating every 18 years, 11 days, and containing 72 events. The series started with a partial solar eclipse on July 13, 1219. It contains annular eclipses from November 20, 1435 through January 13, 1526; a hybrid eclipse on January 24, 1544; and total eclipses from February 3, 1562 through June 21, 2373. The series ends at member 72 as a partial eclipse on September 5, 2499. Its eclipses are tabulated in three columns; every third eclipse in the same column is one exeligmos apart, so they all cast shadows over approximately the same parts of the Earth.

The longest duration of annularity was produced by member 25 at 1 minutes, 14 seconds on November 30, 1453, and the longest duration of totality was produced by member 61 at 6 minutes, 50 seconds on August 7, 1850. All eclipses in this series occur at the Moon’s ascending node of orbit.

Series members 34–55 occur between 1801 and 2200:
34	35	36
July 17, 1814	July 27, 1832	August 7, 1850
37	38	39
August 18, 1868	August 29, 1886	September 9, 1904
40	41	42
September 21, 1922	October 1, 1940	October 12, 1958
43	44	45
October 23, 1976	November 3, 1994	November 13, 2012
46	47	48
November 25, 2030	December 5, 2048	December 17, 2066
49	50	51
December 27, 2084	January 8, 2103	January 19, 2121
52	53	54
January 30, 2139	February 9, 2157	February 21, 2175
55
March 3, 2193

=== Metonic series ===
The metonic series repeats eclipses every 19 years (6939.69 days), lasting about 5 cycles. Eclipses occur in nearly the same calendar date. In addition, the octon subseries repeats 1/5 of that or every 3.8 years (1387.94 days). All eclipses in this table occur at the Moon's ascending node.

21 eclipse events between July 1, 2000 and July 1, 2076
July 1–2	April 19–20	February 5–7	November 24–25	September 12–13
117	119	121	123	125
July 1, 2000	April 19, 2004	February 7, 2008	November 25, 2011	September 13, 2015
127	129	131	133	135
July 2, 2019	April 20, 2023	February 6, 2027	November 25, 2030	September 12, 2034
137	139	141	143	145
July 2, 2038	April 20, 2042	February 5, 2046	November 25, 2049	September 12, 2053
147	149	151	153	155
July 1, 2057	April 20, 2061	February 5, 2065	November 24, 2068	September 12, 2072
157
July 1, 2076

=== Tritos series ===
This eclipse is a part of a tritos cycle, repeating at alternating nodes every 135 synodic months (≈ 3986.63 days, or 11 years minus 1 month). Their appearance and longitude are irregular due to a lack of synchronization with the anomalistic month (period of perigee), but groupings of 3 tritos cycles (≈ 33 years minus 3 months) come close (≈ 434.044 anomalistic months), so eclipses are similar in these groupings.

Series members between 1801 and 2200
September 8, 1801 (Saros 112)	August 7, 1812 (Saros 113)	July 8, 1823 (Saros 114)	June 7, 1834 (Saros 115)	May 6, 1845 (Saros 116)
April 5, 1856 (Saros 117)	March 6, 1867 (Saros 118)	February 2, 1878 (Saros 119)	January 1, 1889 (Saros 120)	December 3, 1899 (Saros 121)
November 2, 1910 (Saros 122)	October 1, 1921 (Saros 123)	August 31, 1932 (Saros 124)	August 1, 1943 (Saros 125)	June 30, 1954 (Saros 126)
May 30, 1965 (Saros 127)	April 29, 1976 (Saros 128)	March 29, 1987 (Saros 129)	February 26, 1998 (Saros 130)	January 26, 2009 (Saros 131)
December 26, 2019 (Saros 132)	November 25, 2030 (Saros 133)	October 25, 2041 (Saros 134)	September 22, 2052 (Saros 135)	August 24, 2063 (Saros 136)
July 24, 2074 (Saros 137)	June 22, 2085 (Saros 138)	May 22, 2096 (Saros 139)	April 23, 2107 (Saros 140)	March 22, 2118 (Saros 141)
February 18, 2129 (Saros 142)	January 20, 2140 (Saros 143)	December 19, 2150 (Saros 144)	November 17, 2161 (Saros 145)	October 17, 2172 (Saros 146)
September 16, 2183 (Saros 147)	August 16, 2194 (Saros 148)			

=== Inex series ===
This eclipse is a part of the long period inex cycle, repeating at alternating nodes, every 358 synodic months (≈ 10,571.95 days, or 29 years minus 20 days). Their appearance and longitude are irregular due to a lack of synchronization with the anomalistic month (period of perigee). However, groupings of 3 inex cycles (≈ 87 years minus 2 months) comes close (≈ 1,151.02 anomalistic months), so eclipses are similar in these groupings.

Series members between 1801 and 2200
April 14, 1828 (Saros 126)	March 25, 1857 (Saros 127)	March 5, 1886 (Saros 128)
February 14, 1915 (Saros 129)	January 25, 1944 (Saros 130)	January 4, 1973 (Saros 131)
December 14, 2001 (Saros 132)	November 25, 2030 (Saros 133)	November 5, 2059 (Saros 134)
October 14, 2088 (Saros 135)	September 26, 2117 (Saros 136)	September 6, 2146 (Saros 137)
August 16, 2175 (Saros 138)		
