= Solar eclipse of December 15, 2039 =

Total eclipse

- Total eclipse
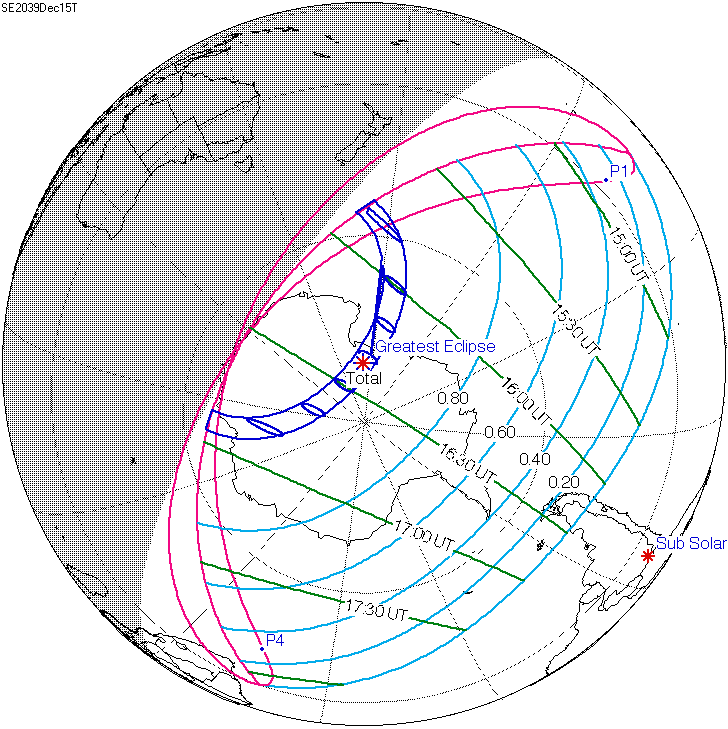
- Map
- Gamma: −0.9458
- Magnitude: 1.0356

Maximum eclipse
- Duration: 111 s (1 min 51 s)
- Coordinates: 80.9°S 172.8°E
- Max. width of band: 380 km (240 mi)

Times (UTC)
- Greatest eclipse: 16:23:46

References
- Saros: 152 (14 of 70)
- Catalog # (SE5000): 9596

A total solar eclipse will occur at the Moon's descending node of orbit on Thursday, December 15, 2039, with a magnitude of 1.0356. A solar eclipse occurs when the Moon passes between Earth and the Sun, thereby totally or partly obscuring the image of the Sun for a viewer on Earth. A total solar eclipse occurs when the Moon's apparent diameter is larger than the Sun's, blocking all direct sunlight, turning day into darkness. Totality occurs in a narrow path across Earth's surface, with the partial solar eclipse visible over a surrounding region thousands of kilometres wide. Occurring about 4.5 hours before perigee (on December 15, 2039, at 20:55 UTC), the Moon's apparent diameter will be larger.

The totality of the eclipse begins in the southern Pacific Ocean, passing over much of Antarctica and closely reaching the South Pole. A partial eclipse will be visible in the southern extremities of South America and Africa. It will terminate in the southern Indian Ocean several hours later.

== Images ==
Animated path

== Eclipse timing ==
=== Places experiencing total eclipse ===
Solar Eclipse of December 15, 2039 (Local Times)
Country or territory	City or place	Start of partial eclipse	Start of total eclipse	Maximum eclipse	End of total eclipse	End of partial eclipse	Duration of totality (min:s)	Duration of eclipse (hr:min)	Maximum magnitude
Antarctica	Davis Station	23:05:31	23:53:39	23:54:23	23:55:08	00:42:34 (Note: The time listed here for this location occurs on December 16, 2039, local time.)	1:29	1:37	1.0155

=== Places experiencing partial eclipse ===
Solar Eclipse of December 15, 2039 (Local Times)
Country or territory	City or place	Start of partial eclipse	Maximum eclipse	End of partial eclipse	Duration of eclipse (hr:min)	Maximum coverage
French Polynesia	Gambier Islands	05:19:39	05:47:29	06:16:35	0:57	7.89%
Pitcairn Islands	Adamstown	06:20:44	06:48:26	07:17:26	0:57	7.00%
New Zealand	Chatham Islands (Note: The times listed for this location occur on December 16, 2039, local time.)	05:42:22 (sunrise)	05:45:59	06:04:00	0:22	25.97%
Antarctica	Dumont d'Urville Station	01:32:24	02:19:35	03:07:20	1:35	90.73%
Antarctica	McMurdo Station	04:28:03	05:19:44	06:12:10	1:44	99.36%
Chile	Punta Arenas	12:42:31	13:22:58	14:03:53	1:21	7.53%
Argentina	Ushuaia	12:44:19	13:28:10	14:12:18	1:28	10.10%
Argentina	Río Grande	12:47:38	13:28:37	14:09:49	1:22	7.82%
Chile	Puerto Williams	12:45:23	13:29:20	14:13:31	1:28	10.18%
Antarctica	Concordia Station	23:42:11	00:31:43	01:21:24	1:39	94.33%
Antarctica	San Martín Base	12:36:07	13:34:20	14:32:37	1:57	43.71%
Antarctica	Palmer Station	12:40:03	13:36:38	14:33:06	1:53	33.99%
Antarctica	Casey Station	23:49:55	00:37:35	01:23:40	1:34	92.52%
Antarctica	Carlini Base	12:48:13	13:42:29	14:36:14	1:48	26.36%
Antarctica	Esperanza Base	12:48:54	13:44:06	14:38:40	1:50	29.33%
Antarctica	Marambio Base	12:48:26	13:44:16	14:39:27	1:51	31.59%
Falkland Islands	Stanley	13:15:29	13:45:04	14:14:24	0:59	2.59%
Antarctica	Belgrano II Base	12:50:50	13:48:45	14:45:51	1:55	68.92%
Antarctica	Orcadas Base	13:06:51	13:58:47	14:49:16	1:42	22.80%
Antarctica	Mawson Station	21:12:44	22:02:24	22:51:01	1:38	95.51%
Antarctica	Troll	16:11:48	17:07:19	18:01:04	1:49	67.60%
South Georgia and the South Sandwich Islands	King Edward Point	14:33:39	15:14:38	15:54:06	1:20	9.62%
South Africa	Marion Island	19:51:27	20:15:09	20:19:06 (sunset)	0:28	29.59%
South Africa	Gqeberha	19:23:11	19:23:55	19:24:41 (sunset)	0:02	0.11%
South Africa	Knysna	19:25:39	19:32:05	19:35:06 (sunset)	0:09	2.39%
South Africa	George	19:26:27	19:34:14	19:37:14 (sunset)	0:11	3.00%
Bouvet Island	Bouvet Island	17:48:34	18:36:18	19:21:36	1:33	33.65%
South Africa	Hermanus	19:28:44	19:43:12	19:51:22 (sunset)	0:23	5.69%
South Africa	Stellenbosch	19:30:26	19:48:35	19:51:35 (sunset)	0:21	6.51%
South Africa	Cape Town	19:30:58	19:50:19	19:53:19 (sunset)	0:22	6.62%

== Eclipse details ==
Shown below are two tables displaying details about this particular solar eclipse. The first table outlines times at which the Moon's penumbra or umbra attains the specific parameter, and the second table describes various other parameters pertaining to this eclipse.

December 15, 2039 Solar Eclipse Times
Event	Time (UTC)
First Penumbral External Contact	2039 December 15 at 14:18:57.1 UTC
First Umbral External Contact	2039 December 15 at 15:48:33.4 UTC
First Central Line	2039 December 15 at 15:51:02.4 UTC
First Umbral Internal Contact	2039 December 15 at 15:53:42.4 UTC
Greatest Eclipse	2039 December 15 at 16:23:45.9 UTC
Greatest Duration	2039 December 15 at 16:23:51.5 UTC
Ecliptic Conjunction	2039 December 15 at 16:33:15.1 UTC
Equatorial Conjunction	2039 December 15 at 16:38:03.7 UTC
Last Umbral Internal Contact	2039 December 15 at 16:53:39.5 UTC
Last Central Line	2039 December 15 at 16:56:19.9 UTC
Last Umbral External Contact	2039 December 15 at 16:58:49.2 UTC
Last Penumbral External Contact	2039 December 15 at 18:28:28.1 UTC

December 15, 2039 Solar Eclipse Parameters
Parameter	Value
Eclipse Magnitude	1.03558
Eclipse Obscuration	1.07243
Gamma	−0.94577
Sun Right Ascension	17h31m51.4s
Sun Declination	-23°16'37.6"
Sun Semi-Diameter	16'14.9"
Sun Equatorial Horizontal Parallax	08.9"
Moon Right Ascension	17h31m14.4s
Moon Declination	-24°13'58.8"
Moon Semi-Diameter	16'44.6"
Moon Equatorial Horizontal Parallax	1°01'26.8"
ΔT	78.5 s

== Eclipse season ==
This eclipse is part of an eclipse season, a period, roughly every six months, when eclipses occur. Only two (or occasionally three) eclipse seasons occur each year, and each season lasts about 35 days and repeats just short of six months (173 days) later; thus two full eclipse seasons always occur each year. Either two or three eclipses happen each eclipse season. In the sequence below, each eclipse is separated by a fortnight.

Eclipse season of November–December 2039
November 30 Ascending node (full moon)	December 15 Descending node (new moon)
Partial lunar eclipse Lunar Saros 126	Total solar eclipse Solar Saros 152

== Related eclipses ==
=== Eclipses in 2039 ===
- A partial lunar eclipse on June 6.
- An annular solar eclipse on June 21.
- A partial lunar eclipse on November 30.
- A total solar eclipse on December 15.

=== Metonic ===
- Preceded by: Solar eclipse of February 27, 2036
- Followed by: Solar eclipse of October 3, 2043

=== Tzolkinex ===
- Preceded by: Solar eclipse of November 3, 2032
- Followed by: Solar eclipse of January 26, 2047

=== Half-Saros ===
- Preceded by: Lunar eclipse of December 9, 2030
- Followed by: Lunar eclipse of December 20, 2048

=== Tritos ===
- Preceded by: Solar eclipse of January 14, 2029
- Followed by: Solar eclipse of November 14, 2050

=== Solar Saros 152 ===
- Preceded by: Solar eclipse of December 4, 2021
- Followed by: Solar eclipse of December 26, 2057

=== Inex ===
- Preceded by: Solar eclipse of January 4, 2011
- Followed by: Solar eclipse of November 24, 2068

=== Triad ===
- Preceded by: Solar eclipse of February 14, 1953
- Followed by: Solar eclipse of October 16, 2126

=== Solar eclipses of 2036–2039 ===
This eclipse is a member of a semester series. An eclipse in a semester series of solar eclipses repeats approximately every 177 days and 4 hours (a semester) at alternating nodes of the Moon's orbit.

The partial solar eclipses on February 27, 2036 and August 21, 2036 occur in the previous lunar year eclipse set.

Solar eclipse series sets from 2036 to 2039
Ascending node			Descending node		
Saros	Map	Gamma	Saros	Map	Gamma
117	July 23, 2036 Partial	−1.425	122	January 16, 2037 Partial	1.1477
127	July 13, 2037 Total	−0.7246	132	January 5, 2038 Annular	0.4169
137	July 2, 2038 Annular	0.0398	142	December 26, 2038 Total	−0.2881
147	June 21, 2039 Annular	0.8312	152	December 15, 2039 Total	−0.9458

=== Saros 152 ===
This eclipse is a part of Saros series 152, repeating every 18 years, 11 days, and containing 70 events. The series started with a partial solar eclipse on July 26, 1805. It contains total eclipses from November 2, 1967 through September 14, 2490; hybrid eclipses from September 26, 2508 through October 17, 2544; and annular eclipses from October 29, 2562 through June 16, 2941. The series ends at member 70 as a partial eclipse on August 20, 3049. Its eclipses are tabulated in three columns; every third eclipse in the same column is one exeligmos apart, so they all cast shadows over approximately the same parts of the Earth.

The longest duration of totality will be produced by member 30 at 5 minutes, 16 seconds on June 9, 2328, and the longest duration of annularity will be produced by member 53 at 5 minutes, 20 seconds on February 16, 2743. All eclipses in this series occur at the Moon’s descending node of orbit.

Series members 1–22 occur between 1805 and 2200:
1	2	3
July 26, 1805	August 6, 1823	August 16, 1841
4	5	6
August 28, 1859	September 7, 1877	September 18, 1895
7	8	9
September 30, 1913	October 11, 1931	October 21, 1949
10	11	12
November 2, 1967	November 12, 1985	November 23, 2003
13	14	15
December 4, 2021	December 15, 2039	December 26, 2057
16	17	18
January 6, 2076	January 16, 2094	January 29, 2112
19	20	21
February 8, 2130	February 19, 2148	March 2, 2166
22
March 12, 2184

=== Metonic series ===
The metonic series repeats eclipses every 19 years (6939.69 days), lasting about 5 cycles. Eclipses occur in nearly the same calendar date. In addition, the octon subseries repeats 1/5 of that or every 3.8 years (1387.94 days). All eclipses in this table occur at the Moon's descending node.

21 eclipse events between July 22, 1971 and July 22, 2047
July 22	May 9–11	February 26–27	December 14–15	October 2–3
116	118	120	122	124
July 22, 1971	May 11, 1975	February 26, 1979	December 15, 1982	October 3, 1986
126	128	130	132	134
July 22, 1990	May 10, 1994	February 26, 1998	December 14, 2001	October 3, 2005
136	138	140	142	144
July 22, 2009	May 10, 2013	February 26, 2017	December 14, 2020	October 2, 2024
146	148	150	152	154
July 22, 2028	May 9, 2032	February 27, 2036	December 15, 2039	October 3, 2043
156
July 22, 2047

=== Tritos series ===
This eclipse is a part of a tritos cycle, repeating at alternating nodes every 135 synodic months (≈ 3986.63 days, or 11 years minus 1 month). Their appearance and longitude are irregular due to a lack of synchronization with the anomalistic month (period of perigee), but groupings of 3 tritos cycles (≈ 33 years minus 3 months) come close (≈ 434.044 anomalistic months), so eclipses are similar in these groupings.

The partial solar eclipses on December 7, 2170 (part of Saros 164) and November 7, 2181 (part of Saros 165) are also a part of this series but are not included in the table below.

Series members between 1801 and 2105
September 28, 1810 (Saros 131)	August 27, 1821 (Saros 132)	July 27, 1832 (Saros 133)	June 27, 1843 (Saros 134)	May 26, 1854 (Saros 135)
April 25, 1865 (Saros 136)	March 25, 1876 (Saros 137)	February 22, 1887 (Saros 138)	January 22, 1898 (Saros 139)	December 23, 1908 (Saros 140)
November 22, 1919 (Saros 141)	October 21, 1930 (Saros 142)	September 21, 1941 (Saros 143)	August 20, 1952 (Saros 144)	July 20, 1963 (Saros 145)
June 20, 1974 (Saros 146)	May 19, 1985 (Saros 147)	April 17, 1996 (Saros 148)	March 19, 2007 (Saros 149)	February 15, 2018 (Saros 150)
January 14, 2029 (Saros 151)	December 15, 2039 (Saros 152)	November 14, 2050 (Saros 153)	October 13, 2061 (Saros 154)	September 12, 2072 (Saros 155)
August 13, 2083 (Saros 156)	July 12, 2094 (Saros 157)	June 12, 2105 (Saros 158)		

=== Inex series ===
This eclipse is a part of the long period inex cycle, repeating at alternating nodes, every 358 synodic months (≈ 10,571.95 days, or 29 years minus 20 days). Their appearance and longitude are irregular due to a lack of synchronization with the anomalistic month (period of perigee). However, groupings of 3 inex cycles (≈ 87 years minus 2 months) comes close (≈ 1,151.02 anomalistic months), so eclipses are similar in these groupings.

Series members between 1801 and 2200
May 25, 1808 (Saros 144)	May 4, 1837 (Saros 145)	April 15, 1866 (Saros 146)
March 26, 1895 (Saros 147)	March 5, 1924 (Saros 148)	February 14, 1953 (Saros 149)
January 24, 1982 (Saros 150)	January 4, 2011 (Saros 151)	December 15, 2039 (Saros 152)
November 24, 2068 (Saros 153)	November 4, 2097 (Saros 154)	October 16, 2126 (Saros 155)
September 26, 2155 (Saros 156)	September 4, 2184 (Saros 157)	
