= Solar eclipse of July 13, 2037 =

Total eclipse

- Total eclipse
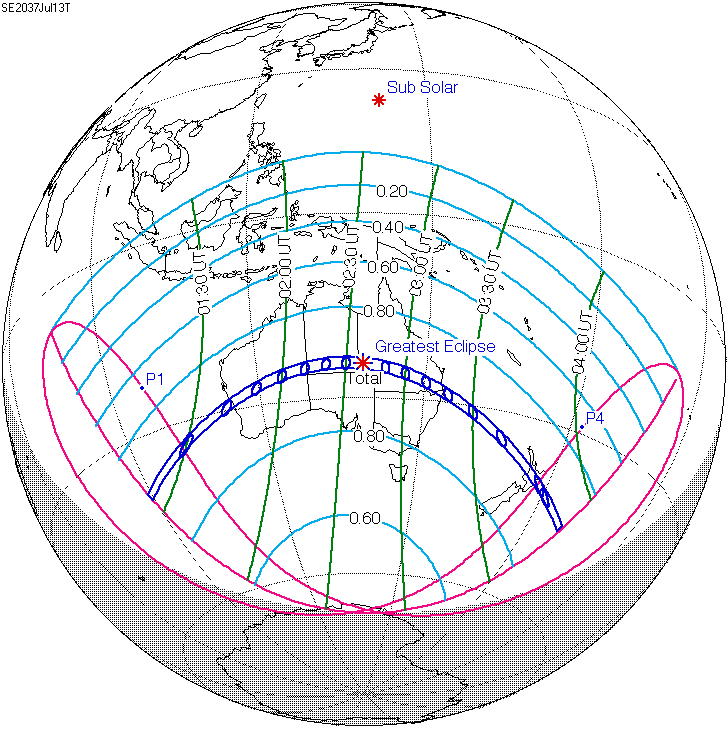
- Map
- Gamma: −0.7246
- Magnitude: 1.0413

Maximum eclipse
- Duration: 238 s (3 min 58 s)
- Coordinates: 24.8°S 139.1°E
- Max. width of band: 201 km (125 mi)

Times (UTC)
- Greatest eclipse: 2:40:36

References
- Saros: 127 (59 of 82)
- Catalog # (SE5000): 9591

A total solar eclipse will occur at the Moon's ascending node of orbit on Monday, July 13, 2037, with a magnitude of 1.0413. A solar eclipse occurs when the Moon passes between Earth and the Sun, thereby totally or partly obscuring the image of the Sun for a viewer on Earth. A total solar eclipse occurs when the Moon's apparent diameter is larger than the Sun's, blocking all direct sunlight, turning day into darkness. Totality occurs in a narrow path across Earth's surface, with the partial solar eclipse visible over a surrounding region thousands of kilometres wide. Occurring about 2.6 days before perigee (on July 15, 2037, at 17:50 UTC), the Moon's apparent diameter will be larger.

Totality will be visible from parts of Australia (including the center of Brisbane and the Gold Coast, as well as Geraldton, Western Australia) and New Zealand. A partial eclipse will be visible for parts of Indonesia, Australia, and Oceania.

== Images ==
Animated path

== Eclipse timing ==
=== Places experiencing total eclipse ===
Solar Eclipse of July 13, 2037 (Local Times)
Country or territory	City or place	Start of partial eclipse	Start of total eclipse	Maximum eclipse	End of total eclipse	End of partial eclipse	Duration of totality (min:s)	Duration of eclipse (hr:min)	Maximum magnitude
Australia	Geraldton	08:25:28	09:40:48	09:47:07	09:43:26	11:09:42	2:38	2:44	1.0104
Australia	Wiluna	08:29:56	09:50:16	09:51:21	09:52:25	11:23:41	2:09	2:54	1.0051
Australia	Uluru	10:16:14	11:45:19	11:46:54	11:48:29	13:24:11	3:10	3:08	1.0095
Australia	Curtin Springs	10:17:38	11:47:20	11:48:52	11:50:24	13:26:13	3:04	3:09	1.0086
Australia	Charleville	11:23:13	12:58:13	13:00:01	13:01:49	14:31:21	3:36	3:08	1.0135
Australia	Roma	11:30:18	13:04:58	13:06:47	13:08:35	14:36:10	3:37	3:06	1.0152
Australia	Dalby	11:37:27	13:11:28	13:13:01	13:14:34	14:40:17	3:06	3:03	1.0098
Australia	Toowoomba	11:39:31	13:13:00	13:14:39	13:16:19	14:41:16	3:19	3:02	1.0125
Australia	Ipswich	11:41:46	13:15:15	13:16:35	13:17:54	14:42:32	2:39	3:01	1.0069
Australia	Brisbane	11:42:28	13:16:42	13:17:14	13:17:46	14:43:00	1:04	3:01	1.0013
Australia	Lismore	11:43:34	13:16:01	13:17:37	13:19:13	14:42:49	3:12	2:59	1.0116
Australia	Gold Coast	11:43:44	13:16:36	13:18:06	13:19:36	14:43:25	3:00	3:00	1.0097
Australia	Ballina	11:44:22	13:16:37	13:18:16	13:19:53	14:43:14	3:16	2:59	1.0127
Australia	Tweed Heads	11:44:06	13:16:43	13:18:20	13:19:57	14:43:31	3:14	2:59	1.0125
Australia	Byron Bay	11:44:26	13:16:40	13:18:25	13:20:10	14:43:24	3:30	2:59	1.0182
Australia	Lord Howe Island	12:29:26	13:58:10	13:59:11	14:00:13	15:19:14	2:03	2:50	1.0048
New Zealand	Te Awamutu	14:31:52	15:48:23	15:48:54	15:49:26	16:57:33	1:03	2:26	1.0021
New Zealand	Taupō	14:32:41	15:48:04	15:49:06	15:50:08	16:57:19	2:04	2:25	1.009
New Zealand	Napier	14:33:30	15:48:04	15:49:14	15:50:24	16:56:57	2:20	2:23	1.0159

=== Places experiencing partial eclipse ===
Solar Eclipse of July 13, 2037 (Local Times)
Country or territory	City or place	Start of partial eclipse	Maximum eclipse	End of partial eclipse	Duration of eclipse (hr:min)	Maximum coverage
Cocos (Keeling) Islands	Bantam	06:51:54	07:42:43	08:39:27	1:48	25.85%
Singapore	Singapore	08:56:17	09:20:12	09:45:21	0:49	1.61%
Christmas Island	Flying Fish Cove	07:22:49	08:21:09	09:27:25	2:05	31.83%
Indonesia	Jakarta	07:29:38	08:22:30	09:21:47	1:52	20.56%
Australia	Perth	08:29:40	09:46:44	11:13:57	2:44	94.03%
Timor-Leste	Dili	09:38:14	10:57:41	12:26:29	2:48	47.77%
French Southern and Antarctic Lands	Île Amsterdam	07:03:01 (sunrise)	07:06:00	07:22:40	0:20	15.04%
Australia	Darwin	10:13:50	11:42:13	13:18:05	3:04	64.15%
Palau	Ngerulmud	10:35:52	11:20:10	12:05:36	1:30	4.69%
Australia	Adelaide	10:41:18	12:10:31	13:39:57	2:59	77.11%
Antarctica	Dumont d'Urville Station	11:44:47	12:45:41	13:46:28	2:02	39.98%
Australia	Melbourne	11:28:30	12:56:28	14:21:12	2:53	73.16%
Antarctica	Casey Station	10:45:57 (sunrise)	10:57:55	11:19:30	0:34	15.61%
Papua New Guinea	Port Moresby	11:27:25	12:59:07	14:25:14	2:58	50.13%
Australia	Canberra	11:36:14	13:06:39	14:31:22	2:55	81.68%
Australia	Sydney	11:40:27	13:11:46	14:36:11	2:56	86.93%
Solomon Islands	Honiara	13:11:42	14:30:55	15:41:08	2:29	35.07%
Nauru	Yaren	15:01:26	15:39:58	16:15:56	1:15	4.08%
New Caledonia	Nouméa	13:21:00	14:44:48	15:57:48	2:37	66.39%
Norfolk Island	Kingston	13:21:32	14:45:17	15:58:41	2:37	85.53%
New Zealand	Wellington	14:29:07	15:45:29	16:54:05	2:25	95.25%
Vanuatu	Port Vila	13:29:52	14:48:02	15:56:16	2:26	48.76%
New Zealand	Auckland	14:31:35	15:49:14	16:58:15	2:27	98.43%
Tuvalu	Funafuti	15:19:09	16:00:39	16:38:53	1:20	7.85%
Fiji	Suva	14:56:29	16:00:57	16:58:06	2:02	34.38%
Wallis and Futuna	Mata Utu	15:18:58	16:05:47	16:48:32	1:30	13.63%
Tonga	Nuku'alofa	16:05:52	17:05:59	17:59:50	1:54	34.26%
Samoa	Apia	16:28:10	17:08:53	17:46:32	1:18	10.07%
Niue	Alofi (Note: The times listed for this location occur on July 12, 2037, local time.)	16:19:36	17:09:36	17:55:11	1:38	21.13%
Cook Islands	Rarotonga	17:30:49	18:10:35	18:13:03 (sunset)	0:42	15.41%

== Eclipse details ==
Shown below are two tables displaying details about this particular solar eclipse. The first table outlines times at which the Moon's penumbra or umbra attains the specific parameter, and the second table describes various other parameters pertaining to this eclipse.

July 13, 2037 Solar Eclipse Times
Event	Time (UTC)
First Penumbral External Contact	2037 July 13 at 00:16:24.2 UTC
First Umbral External Contact	2037 July 13 at 01:26:24.0 UTC
First Central Line	2037 July 13 at 01:27:34.1 UTC
First Umbral Internal Contact	2037 July 13 at 01:28:44.8 UTC
Ecliptic Conjunction	2037 July 13 at 02:33:00.2 UTC
Greatest Eclipse	2037 July 13 at 02:40:35.9 UTC
Greatest Duration	2037 July 13 at 02:41:03.4 UTC
Equatorial Conjunction	2037 July 13 at 02:44:56.2 UTC
Last Umbral Internal Contact	2037 July 13 at 03:52:21.3 UTC
Last Central Line	2037 July 13 at 03:53:34.4 UTC
Last Umbral External Contact	2037 July 13 at 03:54:46.8 UTC
Last Penumbral External Contact	2037 July 13 at 05:04:40.9 UTC

July 13, 2037 Solar Eclipse Parameters
Parameter	Value
Eclipse Magnitude	1.04131
Eclipse Obscuration	1.08433
Gamma	−0.72458
Sun Right Ascension	07h31m06.7s
Sun Declination	+21°46'57.5"
Sun Semi-Diameter	15'44.0"
Sun Equatorial Horizontal Parallax	08.7"
Moon Right Ascension	07h30m56.4s
Moon Declination	+21°04'03.1"
Moon Semi-Diameter	16'12.0"
Moon Equatorial Horizontal Parallax	0°59'27.3"
ΔT	77.3 s

== Eclipse season ==
This eclipse is part of an eclipse season, a period, roughly every six months, when eclipses occur. Only two (or occasionally three) eclipse seasons occur each year, and each season lasts about 35 days and repeats just short of six months (173 days) later; thus two full eclipse seasons always occur each year. Either two or three eclipses happen each eclipse season. In the sequence below, each eclipse is separated by a fortnight.

Eclipse season of July 2037
July 13 Ascending node (new moon)	July 27 Descending node (full moon)
Total solar eclipse Solar Saros 127	Partial lunar eclipse Lunar Saros 139

== Related eclipses ==
=== Eclipses in 2037 ===
- A partial solar eclipse on January 16.
- A total lunar eclipse on January 31.
- A total solar eclipse on July 13.
- A partial lunar eclipse on July 27.

=== Metonic ===
- Preceded by: Solar eclipse of September 23, 2033
- Followed by: Solar eclipse of April 30, 2041

=== Tzolkinex ===
- Preceded by: Solar eclipse of June 1, 2030
- Followed by: Solar eclipse of August 23, 2044

=== Half-Saros ===
- Preceded by: Lunar eclipse of July 6, 2028
- Followed by: Lunar eclipse of July 18, 2046

=== Tritos ===
- Preceded by: Solar eclipse of August 12, 2026
- Followed by: Solar eclipse of June 11, 2048

=== Solar Saros 127 ===
- Preceded by: Solar eclipse of July 2, 2019
- Followed by: Solar eclipse of July 24, 2055

=== Inex ===
- Preceded by: Solar eclipse of August 1, 2008
- Followed by: Solar eclipse of June 22, 2066

=== Triad ===
- Preceded by: Solar eclipse of September 12, 1950
- Followed by: Solar eclipse of May 14, 2124

=== Solar eclipses of 2036–2039 ===
This eclipse is a member of a semester series. An eclipse in a semester series of solar eclipses repeats approximately every 177 days and 4 hours (a semester) at alternating nodes of the Moon's orbit.

The partial solar eclipses on February 27, 2036 and August 21, 2036 occur in the previous lunar year eclipse set.

Solar eclipse series sets from 2036 to 2039
Ascending node			Descending node		
Saros	Map	Gamma	Saros	Map	Gamma
117	July 23, 2036 Partial	−1.425	122	January 16, 2037 Partial	1.1477
127	July 13, 2037 Total	−0.7246	132	January 5, 2038 Annular	0.4169
137	July 2, 2038 Annular	0.0398	142	December 26, 2038 Total	−0.2881
147	June 21, 2039 Annular	0.8312	152	December 15, 2039 Total	−0.9458

=== Saros 127 ===
This eclipse is a part of Saros series 127, repeating every 18 years, 11 days, and containing 82 events. The series started with a partial solar eclipse on October 10, 991 AD. It contains total eclipses from May 14, 1352 through August 15, 2091. There are no annular or hybrid eclipses in this set. The series ends at member 82 as a partial eclipse on March 21, 2452. Its eclipses are tabulated in three columns; every third eclipse in the same column is one exeligmos apart, so they all cast shadows over approximately the same parts of the Earth.

The longest duration of totality was produced by member 31 at 5 minutes, 40 seconds on August 30, 1532. All eclipses in this series occur at the Moon’s ascending node of orbit.

Series members 46–68 occur between 1801 and 2200:
46	47	48
February 21, 1803	March 4, 1821	March 15, 1839
49	50	51
March 25, 1857	April 6, 1875	April 16, 1893
52	53	54
April 28, 1911	May 9, 1929	May 20, 1947
55	56	57
May 30, 1965	June 11, 1983	June 21, 2001
58	59	60
July 2, 2019	July 13, 2037	July 24, 2055
61	62	63
August 3, 2073	August 15, 2091	August 26, 2109
64	65	66
September 6, 2127	September 16, 2145	September 28, 2163
67	68	
October 8, 2181	October 19, 2199	

=== Metonic series ===
The metonic series repeats eclipses every 19 years (6939.69 days), lasting about 5 cycles. Eclipses occur in nearly the same calendar date. In addition, the octon subseries repeats 1/5 of that or every 3.8 years (1387.94 days). All eclipses in this table occur at the Moon's ascending node.

21 eclipse events between July 13, 2018 and July 12, 2094
July 12–13	April 30–May 1	February 16–17	December 5–6	September 22–23
117	119	121	123	125
July 13, 2018	April 30, 2022	February 17, 2026	December 5, 2029	September 23, 2033
127	129	131	133	135
July 13, 2037	April 30, 2041	February 16, 2045	December 5, 2048	September 22, 2052
137	139	141	143	145
July 12, 2056	April 30, 2060	February 17, 2064	December 6, 2067	September 23, 2071
147	149	151	153	155
July 13, 2075	May 1, 2079	February 16, 2083	December 6, 2086	September 23, 2090
157
July 12, 2094

=== Tritos series ===
This eclipse is a part of a tritos cycle, repeating at alternating nodes every 135 synodic months (≈ 3986.63 days, or 11 years minus 1 month). Their appearance and longitude are irregular due to a lack of synchronization with the anomalistic month (period of perigee), but groupings of 3 tritos cycles (≈ 33 years minus 3 months) come close (≈ 434.044 anomalistic months), so eclipses are similar in these groupings.

Series members between 1801 and 2200
March 25, 1819 (Saros 107)	February 23, 1830 (Saros 108)	January 22, 1841 (Saros 109)		November 21, 1862 (Saros 111)
		August 20, 1895 (Saros 114)	July 21, 1906 (Saros 115)	June 19, 1917 (Saros 116)
May 19, 1928 (Saros 117)	April 19, 1939 (Saros 118)	March 18, 1950 (Saros 119)	February 15, 1961 (Saros 120)	January 16, 1972 (Saros 121)
December 15, 1982 (Saros 122)	November 13, 1993 (Saros 123)	October 14, 2004 (Saros 124)	September 13, 2015 (Saros 125)	August 12, 2026 (Saros 126)
July 13, 2037 (Saros 127)	June 11, 2048 (Saros 128)	May 11, 2059 (Saros 129)	April 11, 2070 (Saros 130)	March 10, 2081 (Saros 131)
February 7, 2092 (Saros 132)	January 8, 2103 (Saros 133)	December 8, 2113 (Saros 134)	November 6, 2124 (Saros 135)	October 7, 2135 (Saros 136)
September 6, 2146 (Saros 137)	August 5, 2157 (Saros 138)	July 5, 2168 (Saros 139)	June 5, 2179 (Saros 140)	May 4, 2190 (Saros 141)

=== Inex series ===
This eclipse is a part of the long period inex cycle, repeating at alternating nodes, every 358 synodic months (≈ 10,571.95 days, or 29 years minus 20 days). Their appearance and longitude are irregular due to a lack of synchronization with the anomalistic month (period of perigee). However, groupings of 3 inex cycles (≈ 87 years minus 2 months) comes close (≈ 1,151.02 anomalistic months), so eclipses are similar in these groupings.

Series members between 1801 and 2200
December 21, 1805 (Saros 119)	November 30, 1834 (Saros 120)	November 11, 1863 (Saros 121)
October 20, 1892 (Saros 122)	October 1, 1921 (Saros 123)	September 12, 1950 (Saros 124)
August 22, 1979 (Saros 125)	August 1, 2008 (Saros 126)	July 13, 2037 (Saros 127)
June 22, 2066 (Saros 128)	June 2, 2095 (Saros 129)	May 14, 2124 (Saros 130)
April 23, 2153 (Saros 131)	April 3, 2182 (Saros 132)	
