= Solar eclipse of July 2, 2038 =

Future annular solar eclipse

- Annular eclipse
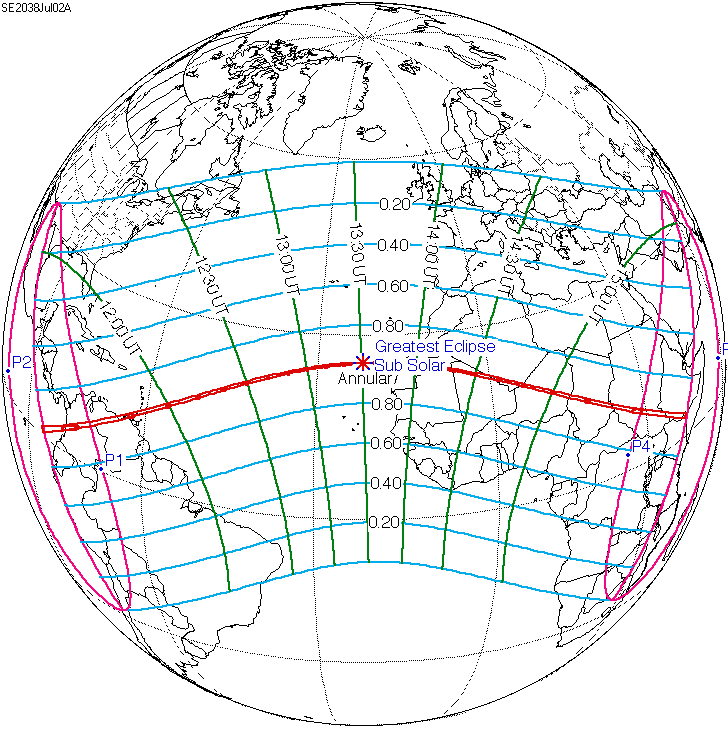
- Map
- Gamma: 0.0398
- Magnitude: 0.9911

Maximum eclipse
- Duration: 60 s (1 min 0 s)
- Coordinates: 25.4°N 21.9°W
- Max. width of band: 31 km (19 mi)

Times (UTC)
- Greatest eclipse: 13:32:55

References
- Saros: 137 (37 of 70)
- Catalog # (SE5000): 9593

An annular solar eclipse will occur at the Moon's ascending node of orbit on Friday, July 2, 2038, with a magnitude of 0.9911. A solar eclipse occurs when the Moon passes between Earth and the Sun, thereby totally or partly obscuring the image of the Sun for a viewer on Earth. An annular solar eclipse occurs when the Moon's apparent diameter is smaller than the Sun's, blocking most of the Sun's light and causing the Sun to look like an annulus (ring). An annular eclipse appears as a partial eclipse over a region of the Earth thousands of kilometres wide. Occurring about 6 days after apogee (on June 26, 2038, at 13:55 UTC), the Moon's apparent diameter will be smaller.

This solar eclipse is notable as it is the closest eclipse in Saros 137 to the subsolar point with an eclipse gamma of 0.0398.

Annularity will be visible from parts of Colombia, Venezuela, Grenada, Barbados, Western Sahara, Mauritania, northern Mali, southern Algeria, Niger, Chad, southwestern Sudan, South Sudan, southern Ethiopia, northeastern Kenya, and southwestern Somalia. A partial eclipse will be visible for parts of eastern North America, Central America, the Caribbean, northern South America, Africa, Western Europe, and the Middle East.

== Images ==
Animated path

== Eclipse timing ==
=== Places experiencing annular eclipse ===
Solar Eclipse of July 2, 2038 (Local Times)
Country or territory	City or place	Start of partial eclipse	Start of annular eclipse	Maximum eclipse	End of annular eclipse	End of partial eclipse	Duration of annularity (min:s)	Duration of eclipse (hr:min)	Maximum coverage
Colombia	Buenaventura	06:02:11 (sunrise)	06:39:20	06:39:47	06:40:13	07:49:33	0:53	1:47	95.51%
Colombia	Armenia	05:55:30 (sunrise)	06:39:51	06:40:15	06:40:40	07:51:05	0:49	1:56	95.60%
Colombia	Pereira	05:55:06 (sunrise)	06:39:40	06:40:25	06:41:10	07:51:16	1:30	1:56	95.61%
Colombia	Manizales	05:53:53 (sunrise)	06:39:51	06:40:35	06:41:19	07:51:36	1:28	1:58	95.62%
Colombia	Arauca	05:38:42	06:42:16	06:42:57	06:43:38	07:57:50	1:22	2:19	95.93%
Venezuela	Cumaná	06:40:15	07:48:05	07:48:47	07:49:29	09:10:00	1:24	2:30	96.38%
Niger	Arlit	14:16:17	15:52:41	15:53:12	15:53:44	17:13:09	1:03	2:57	97.51%

=== Places experiencing partial eclipse ===
Solar Eclipse of July 2, 2038 (Local Times)
Country or territory	City or place	Start of partial eclipse	Maximum eclipse	End of partial eclipse	Duration of eclipse (hr:min)	Maximum coverage
Ecuador	Quito	06:14:57 (sunrise)	06:37:50	07:45:50	1:31	84.37%
Colombia	Bogotá	05:48:59 (sunrise)	06:40:32	07:52:30	2:04	94.00%
Panama	Panama City	06:03:09 (sunrise)	06:42:49	07:50:32	1:47	77.77%
Venezuela	Caracas	06:40:26	07:47:14	09:05:49	2:25	93.28%
Guyana	Georgetown	06:39:14	07:50:26	09:16:03	2:37	75.32%
Trinidad and Tobago	Port of Spain	06:40:33	07:50:52	09:14:46	2:34	94.13%
Grenada	St. George's	06:41:38	07:51:58	09:15:49	2:34	96.52%
Saint Vincent and the Grenadines	Kingstown	06:42:40	07:53:29	09:17:55	2:35	94.10%
Saint Lucia	Castries	06:43:31	07:54:33	09:19:13	2:36	91.67%
Barbados	Bridgetown	06:42:50	07:54:49	09:21:01	2:38	96.68%
Martinique	Fort-de-France	06:44:07	07:55:06	09:19:38	2:36	89.55%
Dominica	Roseau	06:44:50	07:55:35	09:19:39	2:35	86.70%
Puerto Rico	San Juan	06:49:06	07:55:35	09:13:10	2:24	68.54%
Guadeloupe	Basse-Terre	06:45:37	07:56:03	09:19:35	2:34	83.80%
Spain	Valverde	12:56:29	14:43:58	16:27:19	3:31	89.53%
Spain	Las Palmas	13:03:33	14:51:05	16:32:05	3:29	87.56%
Western Sahara	Laayoune	13:09:19	14:58:00	16:37:45	3:28	90.40%
Morocco	Casablanca	13:30:29	15:07:32	16:35:31	3:05	62.40%
Mali	Timbuktu	12:45:42	14:34:39	16:04:38	3:19	77.34%
Algeria	Tamanrasset	14:07:53	15:45:31	17:06:59	2:59	86.80%
Niger	Niamey	14:06:54	15:49:23	17:12:46	3:06	72.45%
Niger	Agadez	14:19:41	15:56:04	17:15:16	2:56	93.63%
Chad	N'Djamena	14:42:10	16:09:40	17:22:16	2:40	87.75%
Sudan	Khartoum	16:06:41	17:16:25	18:17:15	2:11	68.87%
Central African Republic	Birao	14:57:41	16:17:11	17:24:24	2:27	93.94%
Somalia	Bardere	17:20:04	18:20:12	18:22:35 (sunset)	1:03	88.65%
Ethiopia	Addis Ababa	17:15:18	18:21:42	18:48:14 (sunset)	1:33	80.99%
South Sudan	Juba	16:12:25	17:23:46	18:09:38 (sunset)	1:57	89.18%
Uganda	Kampala	17:16:45	18:25:51	18:57:58 (sunset)	1:41	74.93%
Kenya	Nairobi	17:20:07	18:26:24	18:38:18 (sunset)	1:18	75.79%

== Eclipse details ==
Shown below are two tables displaying details about this particular solar eclipse. The first table outlines times at which the Moon's penumbra or umbra attains the specific parameter, and the second table describes various other parameters pertaining to this eclipse.

July 2, 2038 Solar Eclipse Times
Event	Time (UTC)
First Penumbral External Contact	2038 July 2 at 10:37:36.5 UTC
First Umbral External Contact	2038 July 2 at 11:39:19.0 UTC
First Central Line	2038 July 2 at 11:40:07.8 UTC
Greatest Duration	2038 July 2 at 11:40:07.8 UTC
First Umbral Internal Contact	2038 July 2 at 11:40:56.5 UTC
First Penumbral Internal Contact	2038 July 2 at 12:42:42.0 UTC
Greatest Eclipse	2038 July 2 at 13:32:55.0 UTC
Equatorial Conjunction	2038 July 2 at 13:33:00.0 UTC
Ecliptic Conjunction	2038 July 2 at 13:33:21.9 UTC
Last Penumbral Internal Contact	2038 July 2 at 14:23:09.1 UTC
Last Umbral Internal Contact	2038 July 2 at 15:24:55.6 UTC
Last Central Line	2038 July 2 at 15:25:41.5 UTC
Last Umbral External Contact	2038 July 2 at 15:26:27.3 UTC
Last Penumbral External Contact	2038 July 2 at 16:28:07.1 UTC

July 2, 2038 Solar Eclipse Parameters
Parameter	Value
Eclipse Magnitude	0.99113
Eclipse Obscuration	0.98233
Gamma	0.03975
Sun Right Ascension	06h46m55.4s
Sun Declination	+22°59'44.2"
Sun Semi-Diameter	15'43.9"
Sun Equatorial Horizontal Parallax	08.6"
Moon Right Ascension	06h46m55.2s
Moon Declination	+23°01'58.2"
Moon Semi-Diameter	15'20.9"
Moon Equatorial Horizontal Parallax	0°56'19.9"
ΔT	77.8 s

== Eclipse season ==
This eclipse is part of an eclipse season, a period, roughly every six months, when eclipses occur. Only two (or occasionally three) eclipse seasons occur each year, and each season lasts about 35 days and repeats just short of six months (173 days) later; thus two full eclipse seasons always occur each year. Either two or three eclipses happen each eclipse season. In the sequence below, each eclipse is separated by a fortnight. The first and last eclipse in this sequence is separated by one synodic month.

Eclipse season of June–July 2038
June 17 Descending node (full moon)	July 2 Ascending node (new moon)	July 16 Descending node (full moon)
Penumbral lunar eclipse Lunar Saros 111	Annular solar eclipse Solar Saros 137	Penumbral lunar eclipse Lunar Saros 149

== Related eclipses ==
=== Eclipses in 2038 ===
- An annular solar eclipse on January 5.
- A penumbral lunar eclipse on January 21.
- A penumbral lunar eclipse on June 17.
- An annular solar eclipse on July 2.
- A penumbral lunar eclipse on July 16.
- A penumbral lunar eclipse on December 11.
- A total solar eclipse on December 26.

=== Metonic ===
- Preceded by: Solar eclipse of September 12, 2034
- Followed by: Solar eclipse of April 20, 2042

=== Tzolkinex ===
- Preceded by: Solar eclipse of May 21, 2031
- Followed by: Solar eclipse of August 12, 2045

=== Half-Saros ===
- Preceded by: Lunar eclipse of June 26, 2029
- Followed by: Lunar eclipse of July 7, 2047

=== Tritos ===
- Preceded by: Solar eclipse of August 2, 2027
- Followed by: Solar eclipse of May 31, 2049

=== Solar Saros 137 ===
- Preceded by: Solar eclipse of June 21, 2020
- Followed by: Solar eclipse of July 12, 2056

=== Inex ===
- Preceded by: Solar eclipse of July 22, 2009
- Followed by: Solar eclipse of June 11, 2067

=== Triad ===
- Preceded by: Solar eclipse of September 1, 1951
- Followed by: Solar eclipse of May 3, 2125

=== Solar eclipses of 2036–2039 ===
This eclipse is a member of a semester series. An eclipse in a semester series of solar eclipses repeats approximately every 177 days and 4 hours (a semester) at alternating nodes of the Moon's orbit.

The partial solar eclipses on February 27, 2036 and August 21, 2036 occur in the previous lunar year eclipse set.

Solar eclipse series sets from 2036 to 2039
Ascending node			Descending node		
Saros	Map	Gamma	Saros	Map	Gamma
117	July 23, 2036 Partial	−1.425	122	January 16, 2037 Partial	1.1477
127	July 13, 2037 Total	−0.7246	132	January 5, 2038 Annular	0.4169
137	July 2, 2038 Annular	0.0398	142	December 26, 2038 Total	−0.2881
147	June 21, 2039 Annular	0.8312	152	December 15, 2039 Total	−0.9458

=== Saros 137 ===
This eclipse is a part of Saros series 137, repeating every 18 years, 11 days, and containing 70 events. The series started with a partial solar eclipse on May 25, 1389. It contains total eclipses from August 20, 1533 through December 6, 1695; the first set of hybrid eclipses from December 17, 1713 through February 11, 1804; the first set of annular eclipses from February 21, 1822 through March 25, 1876; the second set of hybrid eclipses from April 6, 1894 through April 28, 1930; and the second set of annular eclipses from May 9, 1948 through April 13, 2507. The series ends at member 70 as a partial eclipse on June 28, 2633. Its eclipses are tabulated in three columns; every third eclipse in the same column is one exeligmos apart, so they all cast shadows over approximately the same parts of the Earth.

The longest duration of totality was produced by member 11 at 2 minutes, 55 seconds on September 10, 1569, and the longest duration of annularity will be produced by member 59 at 7 minutes, 5 seconds on February 28, 2435. All eclipses in this series occur at the Moon’s ascending node of orbit.

Series members 24–46 occur between 1801 and 2200:
24	25	26
February 11, 1804	February 21, 1822	March 4, 1840
27	28	29
March 15, 1858	March 25, 1876	April 6, 1894
30	31	32
April 17, 1912	April 28, 1930	May 9, 1948
33	34	35
May 20, 1966	May 30, 1984	June 10, 2002
36	37	38
June 21, 2020	July 2, 2038	July 12, 2056
39	40	41
July 24, 2074	August 3, 2092	August 15, 2110
42	43	44
August 25, 2128	September 6, 2146	September 16, 2164
45	46	
September 27, 2182	October 9, 2200	

=== Metonic series ===
The metonic series repeats eclipses every 19 years (6939.69 days), lasting about 5 cycles. Eclipses occur in nearly the same calendar date. In addition, the octon subseries repeats 1/5 of that or every 3.8 years (1387.94 days). All eclipses in this table occur at the Moon's ascending node.

21 eclipse events between July 1, 2000 and July 1, 2076
July 1–2	April 19–20	February 5–7	November 24–25	September 12–13
117	119	121	123	125
July 1, 2000	April 19, 2004	February 7, 2008	November 25, 2011	September 13, 2015
127	129	131	133	135
July 2, 2019	April 20, 2023	February 6, 2027	November 25, 2030	September 12, 2034
137	139	141	143	145
July 2, 2038	April 20, 2042	February 5, 2046	November 25, 2049	September 12, 2053
147	149	151	153	155
July 1, 2057	April 20, 2061	February 5, 2065	November 24, 2068	September 12, 2072
157
July 1, 2076

=== Tritos series ===
This eclipse is a part of a tritos cycle, repeating at alternating nodes every 135 synodic months (≈ 3986.63 days, or 11 years minus 1 month). Their appearance and longitude are irregular due to a lack of synchronization with the anomalistic month (period of perigee), but groupings of 3 tritos cycles (≈ 33 years minus 3 months) come close (≈ 434.044 anomalistic months), so eclipses are similar in these groupings.

Series members between 1801 and 2200
April 14, 1809 (Saros 116)	March 14, 1820 (Saros 117)	February 12, 1831 (Saros 118)	January 11, 1842 (Saros 119)	December 11, 1852 (Saros 120)
November 11, 1863 (Saros 121)	October 10, 1874 (Saros 122)	September 8, 1885 (Saros 123)	August 9, 1896 (Saros 124)	July 10, 1907 (Saros 125)
June 8, 1918 (Saros 126)	May 9, 1929 (Saros 127)	April 7, 1940 (Saros 128)	March 7, 1951 (Saros 129)	February 5, 1962 (Saros 130)
January 4, 1973 (Saros 131)	December 4, 1983 (Saros 132)	November 3, 1994 (Saros 133)	October 3, 2005 (Saros 134)	September 1, 2016 (Saros 135)
August 2, 2027 (Saros 136)	July 2, 2038 (Saros 137)	May 31, 2049 (Saros 138)	April 30, 2060 (Saros 139)	March 31, 2071 (Saros 140)
February 27, 2082 (Saros 141)	January 27, 2093 (Saros 142)	December 29, 2103 (Saros 143)	November 27, 2114 (Saros 144)	October 26, 2125 (Saros 145)
September 26, 2136 (Saros 146)	August 26, 2147 (Saros 147)	July 25, 2158 (Saros 148)	June 25, 2169 (Saros 149)	May 24, 2180 (Saros 150)
April 23, 2191 (Saros 151)

=== Inex series ===
This eclipse is a part of the long period inex cycle, repeating at alternating nodes, every 358 synodic months (≈ 10,571.95 days, or 29 years minus 20 days). Their appearance and longitude are irregular due to a lack of synchronization with the anomalistic month (period of perigee). However, groupings of 3 inex cycles (≈ 87 years minus 2 months) comes close (≈ 1,151.02 anomalistic months), so eclipses are similar in these groupings.

Series members between 1801 and 2200
December 10, 1806 (Saros 129)	November 20, 1835 (Saros 130)	October 30, 1864 (Saros 131)
October 9, 1893 (Saros 132)	September 21, 1922 (Saros 133)	September 1, 1951 (Saros 134)
August 10, 1980 (Saros 135)	July 22, 2009 (Saros 136)	July 2, 2038 (Saros 137)
June 11, 2067 (Saros 138)	May 22, 2096 (Saros 139)	May 3, 2125 (Saros 140)
April 12, 2154 (Saros 141)	March 23, 2183 (Saros 142)	
