= Solar eclipse of September 13, 2015 =

21st-century partial solar eclipse

- Partial eclipse
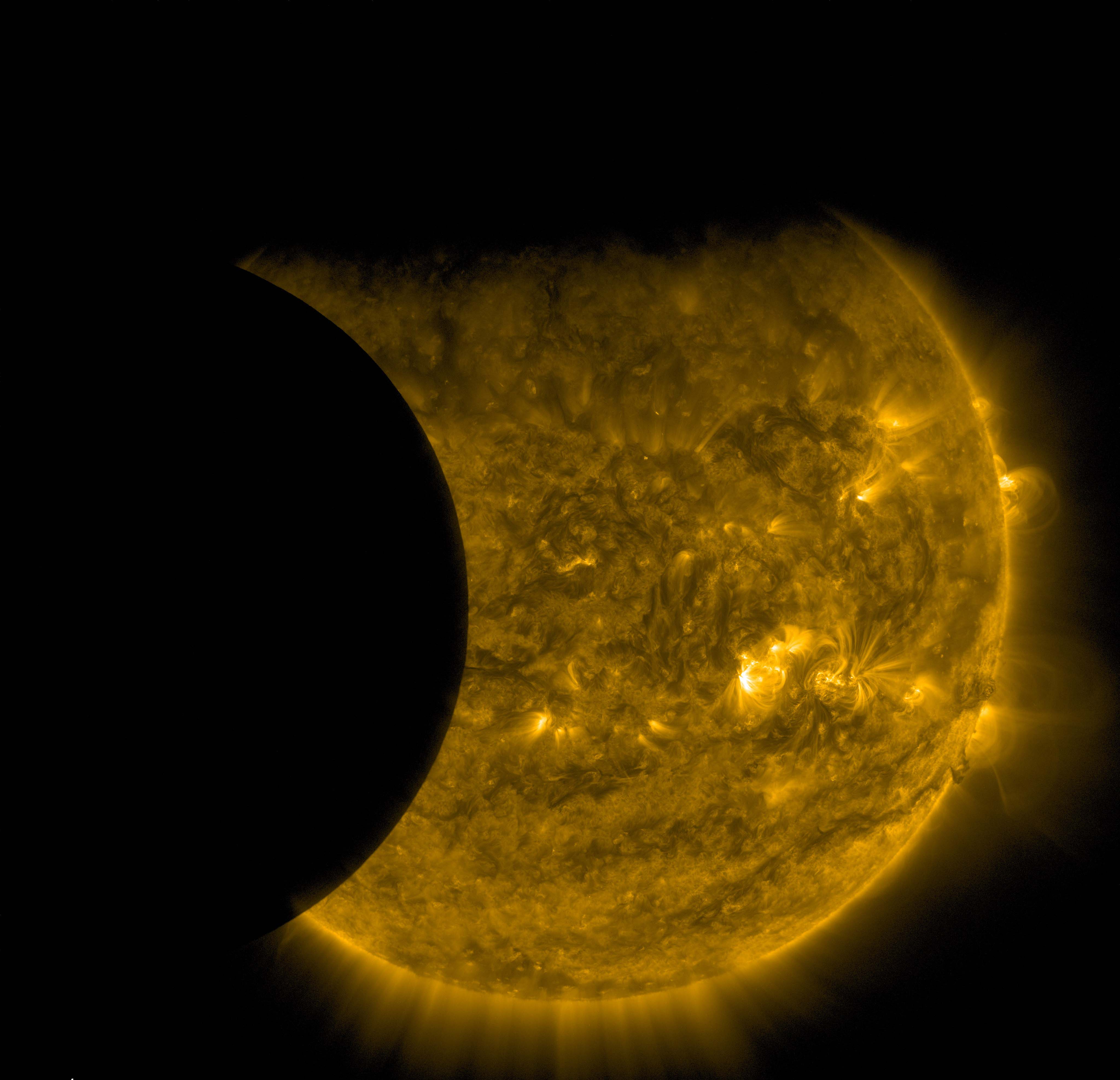
- From the Solar Dynamics Observatory

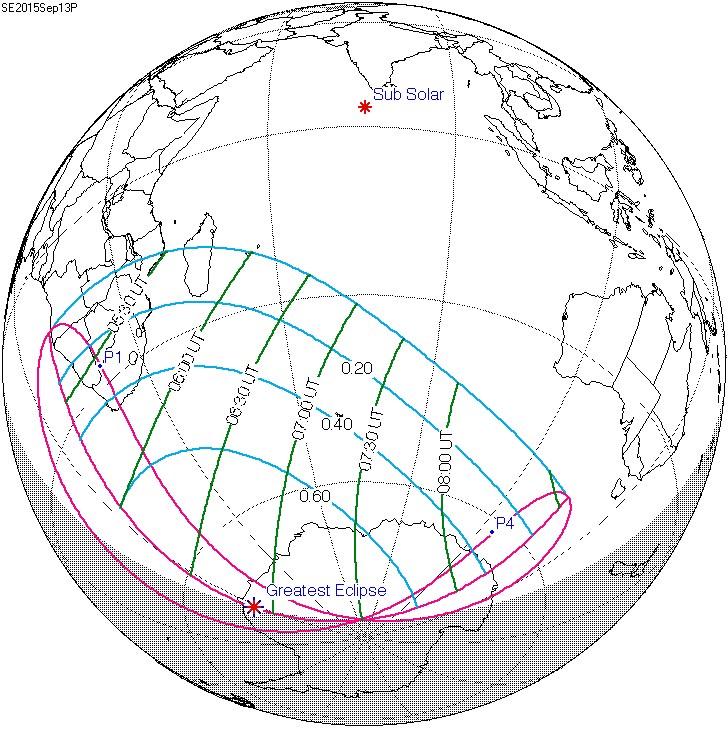
- Map
- Gamma: −1.1004
- Magnitude: 0.7875

Maximum eclipse
- Coordinates: 72.1°S 2.3°W

Times (UTC)
- Greatest eclipse: 6:55:19

References
- Saros: 125 (54 of 73)
- Catalog # (SE5000): 9542

A partial solar eclipse occurred at the Moon's ascending node of orbit on Sunday, September 13, 2015, with a magnitude of 0.7875. A solar eclipse occurs when the Moon passes between Earth and the Sun, thereby totally or partly obscuring the image of the Sun for a viewer on Earth. A partial solar eclipse occurs in the polar regions of the Earth when the center of the Moon's shadow misses the Earth.

A partial eclipse was visible for parts of Southern Africa and East Antarctica.

== Images ==

Animated path

View from center of Sun

== Eclipse timing ==
=== Places experiencing partial eclipse ===
Solar Eclipse of September 13, 2015 (Local Times)
Country or territory	City or place	Start of partial eclipse	Maximum eclipse	End of partial eclipse	Duration of eclipse (hr:min)	Maximum coverage
Zambia	Lusaka	07:03:51	07:19:32	07:35:45	0:32	0.34%
Namibia	Rundu	06:50:32	07:19:42	07:50:42	1:00	2.91%
Malawi	Blantyre	07:10:06	07:24:14	07:38:47	0:29	0.20%
Zimbabwe	Harare	06:54:32	07:24:22	07:56:10	1:02	2.29%
Namibia	Swakopmund	07:00:58 (sunrise)	07:24:59	08:09:25	1:08	9.77%
Namibia	Windhoek	06:50:44 (sunrise)	07:25:14	08:10:34	1:20	9.71%
Namibia	Walvis Bay	07:01:08 (sunrise)	07:25:21	08:10:28	1:09	10.24%
Mozambique	Beira	06:52:45	07:30:06	08:10:31	1:18	4.16%
Botswana	Gaborone	06:42:43	07:31:32	08:25:34	1:43	12.93%
South Africa	Pretoria	06:43:06	07:34:38	08:31:58	1:49	14.50%
South Africa	Johannesburg	06:42:58	07:35:18	08:33:35	1:51	15.32%
Eswatini	Mbabane	06:44:19	07:37:43	08:37:17	1:53	14.94%
Mozambique	Maputo	06:45:11	07:38:14	08:37:23	1:52	14.00%
Lesotho	Teyateyaneng	06:43:08	07:40:04	08:43:56	2:01	20.60%
Lesotho	Maseru	06:43:06	07:40:12	08:44:14	2:01	20.94%
Lesotho	Mafeteng	06:43:11	07:40:55	08:45:42	2:03	21.89%
Madagascar	Antananarivo	08:21:24	08:42:19	09:04:04	0:43	0.45%
Madagascar	Antsirabe	08:14:18	08:43:21	09:14:01	1:00	1.28%
South Africa	Cape Town	06:49:00 (sunrise)	07:43:22	08:49:29	2:00	30.37%
South Africa	Durban	06:44:44	07:43:47	08:50:10	2:05	21.15%
South Africa	Gqeberha	06:45:09	07:47:13	08:57:06	2:12	29.64%
Réunion	Saint-Denis	09:52:06	09:58:06	10:04:09	0:12	0.01%
Bouvet Island	Bouvet Island	07:58:49 (sunrise)	08:18:02	09:29:19	1:31	61.56%
South Africa	Marion Island	08:08:10	09:24:02	10:47:42	2:40	45.83%
French Southern and Antarctic Lands	Île de la Possession	10:22:53	11:41:52	13:06:28	2:44	36.46%
Antarctica	Troll	08:23:27 (sunrise)	08:54:30	10:05:38	1:42	70.98%
French Southern and Antarctic Lands	Port-aux-Français	11:00:22	12:17:05	13:33:51	2:33	25.65%
French Southern and Antarctic Lands	Île Amsterdam	11:33:19	12:18:04	13:02:23	1:29	3.04%
Antarctica	Mawson Station	11:04:40	12:21:59	13:39:47	2:35	54.34%
Antarctica	Casey Station	14:55:21	16:00:59	17:03:38	2:08	31.29%

== Eclipse details ==
Shown below are two tables displaying details about this particular solar eclipse. The first table outlines times at which the Moon's penumbra or umbra attains the specific parameter, and the second table describes various other parameters pertaining to this eclipse.

September 13, 2015 Solar Eclipse Times
Event	Time (UTC)
First Penumbral External Contact	2015 September 13 at 04:42:47.9 UTC
Ecliptic Conjunction	2015 September 13 at 06:42:23.9 UTC
Greatest Eclipse	2015 September 13 at 06:55:19.2 UTC
Equatorial Conjunction	2015 September 13 at 07:36:27.0 UTC
Last Penumbral External Contact	2015 September 13 at 09:07:32.8 UTC

September 13, 2015 Solar Eclipse Parameters
Parameter	Value
Eclipse Magnitude	0.78750
Eclipse Obscuration	0.70966
Gamma	−1.10039
Sun Right Ascension	11h23m54.6s
Sun Declination	+03°53'20.1"
Sun Semi-Diameter	15'53.6"
Sun Equatorial Horizontal Parallax	08.7"
Moon Right Ascension	11h22m43.3s
Moon Declination	+02°56'47.8"
Moon Semi-Diameter	14'43.0"
Moon Equatorial Horizontal Parallax	0°54'00.6"
ΔT	67.8 s

== Eclipse season ==
This eclipse is part of an eclipse season, a period, roughly every six months, when eclipses occur. Only two (or occasionally three) eclipse seasons occur each year, and each season lasts about 35 days and repeats just short of six months (173 days) later; thus two full eclipse seasons always occur each year. Either two or three eclipses happen each eclipse season. In the sequence below, each eclipse is separated by a fortnight.

Eclipse season of September 2015
September 13 Ascending node (new moon)	September 28 Descending node (full moon)
Partial solar eclipse Solar Saros 125	Total lunar eclipse Lunar Saros 137

== Related eclipses ==
=== Eclipses in 2015 ===
- A total solar eclipse on March 20.
- A total lunar eclipse on April 4.
- A partial solar eclipse on September 13.
- A total lunar eclipse on September 28.

=== Metonic ===
- Preceded by: Solar eclipse of November 25, 2011
- Followed by: Solar eclipse of July 2, 2019

=== Tzolkinex ===
- Preceded by: Solar eclipse of August 1, 2008
- Followed by: Solar eclipse of October 25, 2022

=== Half-Saros ===
- Preceded by: Lunar eclipse of September 7, 2006
- Followed by: Lunar eclipse of September 18, 2024

=== Tritos ===
- Preceded by: Solar eclipse of October 14, 2004
- Followed by: Solar eclipse of August 12, 2026

=== Solar Saros 125 ===
- Preceded by: Solar eclipse of September 2, 1997
- Followed by: Solar eclipse of September 23, 2033

=== Inex ===
- Preceded by: Solar eclipse of October 3, 1986
- Followed by: Solar eclipse of August 23, 2044

=== Triad ===
- Preceded by: Solar eclipse of November 12, 1928
- Followed by: Solar eclipse of July 15, 2102

=== Solar eclipses of 2015–2018 ===
This eclipse is a member of a semester series. An eclipse in a semester series of solar eclipses repeats approximately every 177 days and 4 hours (a semester) at alternating nodes of the Moon's orbit.

The partial solar eclipse on July 13, 2018 occurs in the next lunar year eclipse set.

Solar eclipse series sets from 2015 to 2018
Descending node			Ascending node		
Saros	Map	Gamma	Saros	Map	Gamma
120 Totality in Longyearbyen, Svalbard	March 20, 2015 Total	0.94536	125 Solar Dynamics Observatory	September 13, 2015 Partial	−1.10039
130 Balikpapan, Indonesia	March 9, 2016 Total	0.26092	135 Annularity in L'Étang-Salé, Réunion	September 1, 2016 Annular	−0.33301
140 Partial from Buenos Aires, Argentina	February 26, 2017 Annular	−0.45780	145 Totality in Madras, OR, USA	August 21, 2017 Total	0.43671
150 Partial in Olivos, Buenos Aires, Argentina	February 15, 2018 Partial	−1.21163	155 Partial in Huittinen, Finland	August 11, 2018 Partial	1.14758

=== Saros 125 ===
This eclipse is a part of Saros series 125, repeating every 18 years, 11 days, and containing 73 events. The series started with a partial solar eclipse on February 4, 1060. It contains total eclipses from June 13, 1276 through July 16, 1330; hybrid eclipses on July 26, 1348 and August 7, 1366; and annular eclipses from August 17, 1384 through August 22, 1979. The series ends at member 73 as a partial eclipse on April 9, 2358. Its eclipses are tabulated in three columns; every third eclipse in the same column is one exeligmos apart, so they all cast shadows over approximately the same parts of the Earth.

The longest duration of totality was produced by member 14 at 1 minutes, 11 seconds on June 25, 1294, and the longest duration of annularity was produced by member 48 at 7 minutes, 23 seconds on July 10, 1907. All eclipses in this series occur at the Moon’s ascending node of orbit.

Series members 43–64 occur between 1801 and 2200:
43	44	45
May 16, 1817	May 27, 1835	June 6, 1853
46	47	48
June 18, 1871	June 28, 1889	July 10, 1907
49	50	51
July 20, 1925	August 1, 1943	August 11, 1961
52	53	54
August 22, 1979	September 2, 1997	September 13, 2015
55	56	57
September 23, 2033	October 4, 2051	October 15, 2069
58	59	60
October 26, 2087	November 6, 2105	November 18, 2123
61	62	63
November 28, 2141	December 9, 2159	December 20, 2177
64
December 31, 2195

=== Metonic series ===
The metonic series repeats eclipses every 19 years (6939.69 days), lasting about 5 cycles. Eclipses occur in nearly the same calendar date. In addition, the octon subseries repeats 1/5 of that or every 3.8 years (1387.94 days). All eclipses in this table occur at the Moon's ascending node.

21 eclipse events between July 1, 2000 and July 1, 2076
July 1–2	April 19–20	February 5–7	November 24–25	September 12–13
117	119	121	123	125
July 1, 2000	April 19, 2004	February 7, 2008	November 25, 2011	September 13, 2015
127	129	131	133	135
July 2, 2019	April 20, 2023	February 6, 2027	November 25, 2030	September 12, 2034
137	139	141	143	145
July 2, 2038	April 20, 2042	February 5, 2046	November 25, 2049	September 12, 2053
147	149	151	153	155
July 1, 2057	April 20, 2061	February 5, 2065	November 24, 2068	September 12, 2072
157
July 1, 2076

=== Tritos series ===
This eclipse is a part of a tritos cycle, repeating at alternating nodes every 135 synodic months (≈ 3986.63 days, or 11 years minus 1 month). Their appearance and longitude are irregular due to a lack of synchronization with the anomalistic month (period of perigee), but groupings of 3 tritos cycles (≈ 33 years minus 3 months) come close (≈ 434.044 anomalistic months), so eclipses are similar in these groupings.

Series members between 1801 and 2200
March 25, 1819 (Saros 107)	February 23, 1830 (Saros 108)	January 22, 1841 (Saros 109)		November 21, 1862 (Saros 111)
		August 20, 1895 (Saros 114)	July 21, 1906 (Saros 115)	June 19, 1917 (Saros 116)
May 19, 1928 (Saros 117)	April 19, 1939 (Saros 118)	March 18, 1950 (Saros 119)	February 15, 1961 (Saros 120)	January 16, 1972 (Saros 121)
December 15, 1982 (Saros 122)	November 13, 1993 (Saros 123)	October 14, 2004 (Saros 124)	September 13, 2015 (Saros 125)	August 12, 2026 (Saros 126)
July 13, 2037 (Saros 127)	June 11, 2048 (Saros 128)	May 11, 2059 (Saros 129)	April 11, 2070 (Saros 130)	March 10, 2081 (Saros 131)
February 7, 2092 (Saros 132)	January 8, 2103 (Saros 133)	December 8, 2113 (Saros 134)	November 6, 2124 (Saros 135)	October 7, 2135 (Saros 136)
September 6, 2146 (Saros 137)	August 5, 2157 (Saros 138)	July 5, 2168 (Saros 139)	June 5, 2179 (Saros 140)	May 4, 2190 (Saros 141)

=== Inex series ===
This eclipse is a part of the long period inex cycle, repeating at alternating nodes, every 358 synodic months (≈ 10,571.95 days, or 29 years minus 20 days). Their appearance and longitude are irregular due to a lack of synchronization with the anomalistic month (period of perigee). However, groupings of 3 inex cycles (≈ 87 years minus 2 months) comes close (≈ 1,151.02 anomalistic months), so eclipses are similar in these groupings.

Series members between 1801 and 2200
February 1, 1813 (Saros 118)	January 11, 1842 (Saros 119)	December 22, 1870 (Saros 120)
December 3, 1899 (Saros 121)	November 12, 1928 (Saros 122)	October 23, 1957 (Saros 123)
October 3, 1986 (Saros 124)	September 13, 2015 (Saros 125)	August 23, 2044 (Saros 126)
August 3, 2073 (Saros 127)	July 15, 2102 (Saros 128)	June 25, 2131 (Saros 129)
June 4, 2160 (Saros 130)	May 15, 2189 (Saros 131)	
