= November 2060 lunar eclipse =

Penumbral

- Penumbral eclipse
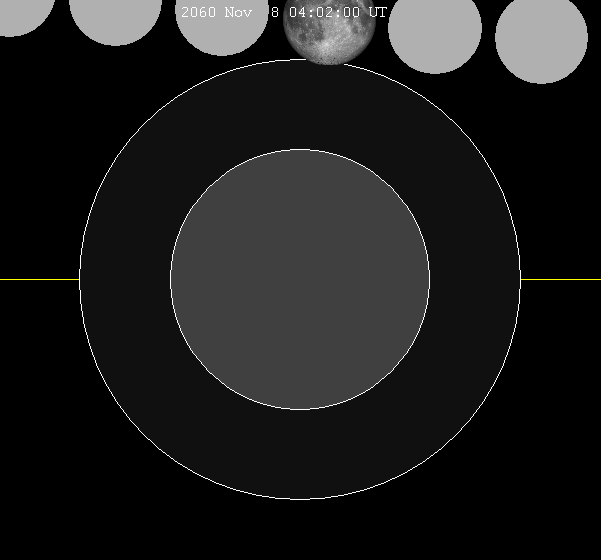
- The Moon's hourly motion shown right to left
- Date: November 8, 2060
- Gamma: 1.5332
- Magnitude: −0.9356
- Saros cycle: 156 (1 of 81)
- Penumbral: 43 minutes, 0 seconds
Contacts (UTC)
- P1: 3:40:33
- Greatest: 4:02:16
- P4: 4:24:00

A penumbral lunar eclipse will occur at the Moon’s ascending node of orbit on Monday, November 8, 2060, with an umbral magnitude of −0.9356. A lunar eclipse occurs when the Moon moves into the Earth's shadow, causing the Moon to be darkened. A penumbral lunar eclipse occurs when part or all of the Moon's near side passes into the Earth's penumbra. Unlike a solar eclipse, which can only be viewed from a relatively small area of the world, a lunar eclipse may be viewed from anywhere on the night side of Earth. Occurring only about 11 hours after perigee (on November 7, 2060, at 17:15 UTC), the Moon's apparent diameter will be larger.

This eclipse will be too small to be visually perceptible.

== Visibility ==
The eclipse will be completely visible over North and South America, West Africa, Europe, and northern Russia.

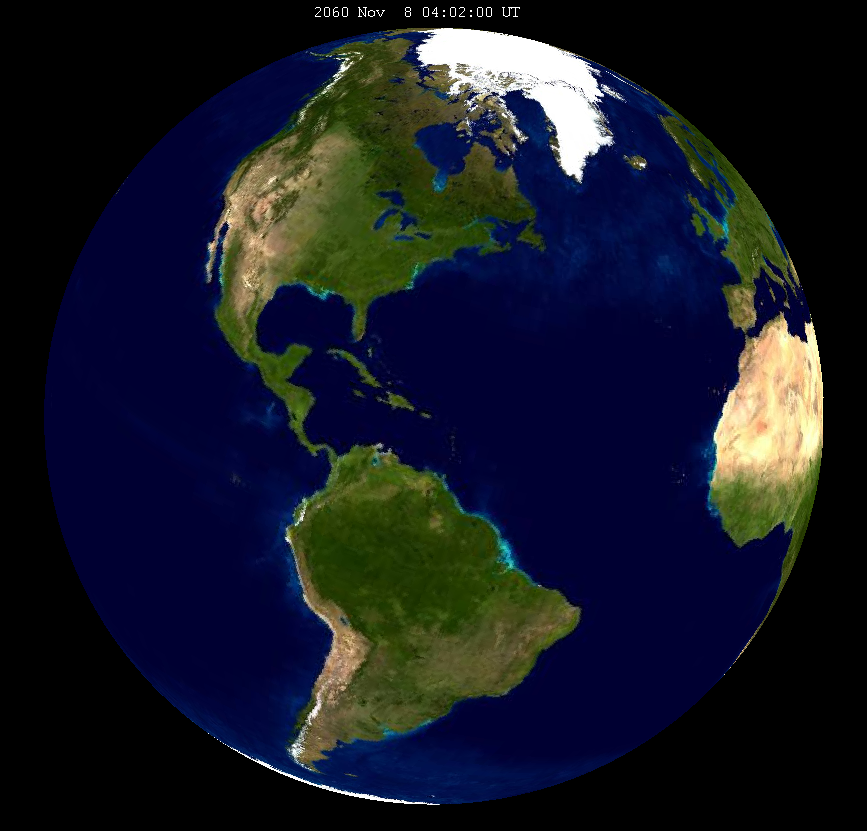
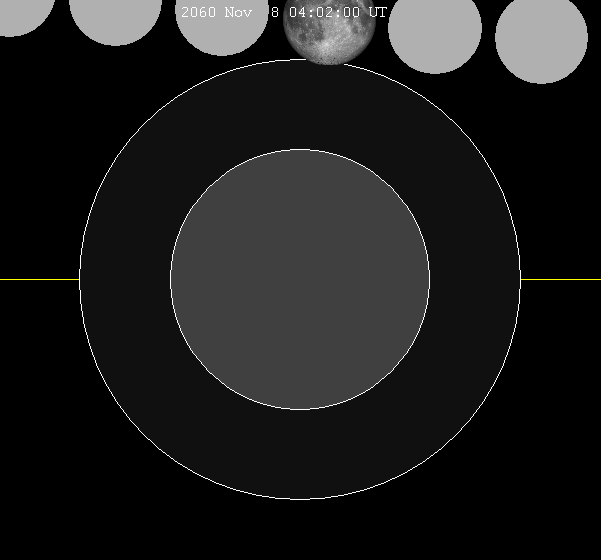

== Eclipse details ==
Shown below is a table displaying details about this particular solar eclipse. It describes various parameters pertaining to this eclipse.

November 8, 2060 Lunar Eclipse Parameters
Parameter	Value
Penumbral Magnitude	0.02860
Umbral Magnitude	−0.93560
Gamma	1.53318
Sun Right Ascension	14h56m11.8s
Sun Declination	-16°46'13.7"
Sun Semi-Diameter	16'08.5"
Sun Equatorial Horizontal Parallax	08.9"
Moon Right Ascension	02h53m43.2s
Moon Declination	+18°13'31.2"
Moon Semi-Diameter	16'44.5"
Moon Equatorial Horizontal Parallax	1°01'26.6"
ΔT	92.5 s

== Eclipse season ==
This eclipse is part of an eclipse season, a period, roughly every six months, when eclipses occur. Only two (or occasionally three) eclipse seasons occur each year, and each season lasts about 35 days and repeats just short of six months (173 days) later; thus two full eclipse seasons always occur each year. Either two or three eclipses happen each eclipse season. In the sequence below, each eclipse is separated by a fortnight. The first and last eclipse in this sequence is separated by one synodic month.

Eclipse season of October–November 2060
October 9 Ascending node (full moon)	October 24 Descending node (new moon)	November 8 Ascending node (full moon)
Penumbral lunar eclipse Lunar Saros 118	Annular solar eclipse Solar Saros 144	Penumbral lunar eclipse Lunar Saros 156

== Related eclipses ==
=== Eclipses in 2060 ===
- A penumbral lunar eclipse on April 15.
- A total solar eclipse on April 30.
- A penumbral lunar eclipse on October 9.
- An annular solar eclipse on October 24.
- A penumbral lunar eclipse on November 8.

=== Lunar Saros 156 ===
- Preceded by: Lunar eclipse of October 28, 2042
- Followed by: Lunar eclipse of November 19, 2078

=== Triad ===
- Followed by: Lunar eclipse of September 9, 2147

=== Lunar eclipses of 2056–2060 ===
This eclipse is a member of a semester series. An eclipse in a semester series of lunar eclipses repeats approximately every 177 days and 4 hours (a semester) at alternating nodes of the Moon's orbit.

The penumbral lunar eclipses on February 1, 2056 and July 26, 2056 occur in the previous lunar year eclipse set, and the penumbral lunar eclipses on April 15, 2060 and October 9, 2060 occur in the next lunar year eclipse set.

Lunar eclipse series sets from 2056 to 2060
Descending node				Ascending node			
Saros	Date Viewing	Type Chart	Gamma	Saros	Date Viewing	Type Chart	Gamma
111	2056 Jun 27	Penumbral	1.3769	116	2056 Dec 22	Penumbral	−1.1559
121	2057 Jun 17	Partial	0.6167	126	2057 Dec 11	Partial	−0.4853
131	2058 Jun 06	Total	−0.1181	136	2058 Nov 30	Total	0.2208
141	2059 May 27	Partial	−0.9097	146	2059 Nov 19	Partial	0.9004
				156	2060 Nov 08	Penumbral	1.5332

=== Metonic series ===
The Metonic cycle repeats nearly exactly every 19 years and represents a Saros cycle plus one lunar year. Because it occurs on the same calendar date, the Earth's shadow will be in nearly the same location relative to the background stars.

1. 1984 May 15.19 - penumbral (111); 2. 2003 May 16.15 - total (121); 3. 2022 May 16.17 - total (131); 4. 2041 May 16.03 - penumbral (141)	1. 1984 Nov 08.75 - penumbral (116); 2. 2003 Nov 09.05 - total (126); 3. 2022 Nov 08.46 - total (136); 4. 2041 Nov 08.19 - partial (146); 5. 2060 Nov 08.17 - penumbral (156)

=== Tritos series ===
This eclipse is a part of a tritos cycle, repeating at alternating nodes every 135 synodic months (≈ 3986.63 days, or 11 years minus 1 month). Their appearance and longitude are irregular due to a lack of synchronization with the anomalistic month (period of perigee), but groupings of 3 tritos cycles (≈ 33 years minus 3 months) come close (≈ 434.044 anomalistic months), so eclipses are similar in these groupings.

Series members between 1801 and 2060
1809 Oct 23 (Saros 133)	1820 Sep 22 (Saros 134)	1831 Aug 23 (Saros 135)	1842 Jul 22 (Saros 136)	1853 Jun 21 (Saros 137)
1864 May 21 (Saros 138)	1875 Apr 20 (Saros 139)	1886 Mar 20 (Saros 140)	1897 Feb 17 (Saros 141)	1908 Jan 18 (Saros 142)
1918 Dec 17 (Saros 143)	1929 Nov 17 (Saros 144)	1940 Oct 16 (Saros 145)	1951 Sep 15 (Saros 146)	1962 Aug 15 (Saros 147)
1973 Jul 15 (Saros 148)	1984 Jun 13 (Saros 149)			
			2060 Nov 08 (Saros 156)	
