= Lunar Saros 156 =

Saros

Saros cycle series 156 for lunar eclipses occurs at the moon's ascending node, 18 years 11 and 1/3 days. It contains 81 events.

This lunar saros is linked to Solar Saros 163.

Cat.	Saros	Mem	Date	Time UT (hr:mn)	Type	Gamma	Magnitude	Duration (min)			Contacts UT (hr:mn)						Chart
Cat.	Saros	Mem	Date	Greatest	Type	Gamma	Magnitude	Pen.	Par.	Tot.	P1	P4	U1	U2	U3	U4	Chart
−	156	−	2042 Oct 28	19:33:51	Penumbral/Miss	1.5567	-0.9738	23.4			19:21:08	19:44:29					
09787	156	1	2060 Nov 08	4:04:15	Penumbral	1.5332	-0.9375	43.6			3:42:27	4:26:03					
09828	156	2	2078 Nov 19	12:40:04	Penumbral	1.5147	-0.9047	66.0			12:07:04	13:13:04					
09870	156	3	2096 Nov 29	21:22:22	Penumbral	1.5017	-0.8816	78.1			20:43:19	22:01:25					
09912	156	4	2114 Dec 12	6:09:26	Penumbral	1.4932	-0.8666	85.0			5:26:56	6:51:56					
09954	156	5	2132 Dec 22	14:59:51	Penumbral	1.4873	-0.8564	89.5			14:15:06	15:44:36					
09998	156	6	2151 Jan 02	23:51:26	Penumbral	1.4828	-0.8484	92.8			23:05:02	0:37:50					
10041	156	7	2169 Jan 13	8:43:52	Penumbral	1.4794	-0.8423	95.1			7:56:19	9:31:25					
10084	156	8	2187 Jan 24	17:35:19	Penumbral	1.4758	-0.8356	97.5			16:46:34	18:24:04					
10127	156	9	2205 Feb 05	2:23:28	Penumbral	1.4699	-0.8245	101.2			1:32:52	3:14:04					
10171	156	10	2223 Feb 16	11:07:58	Penumbral	1.4616	-0.8088	106.1			10:14:55	12:01:01					
10216	156	11	2241 Feb 26	19:46:41	Penumbral	1.4489	-0.7848	113.2			18:50:05	20:43:17					
10261	156	12	2259 Mar 10	4:19:51	Penumbral	1.4323	-0.7537	121.8			3:18:57	5:20:45					
10307	156	13	2277 Mar 20	12:44:38	Penumbral	1.4094	-0.7109	132.7			11:38:17	13:50:59					
10354	156	14	2295 Mar 31	21:02:51	Penumbral	1.3816	-0.6593	144.6			19:50:33	22:15:09					
10400	156	15	2313 Apr 12	5:12:28	Penumbral	1.3473	-0.5956	158.0			3:53:28	6:31:28					
10446	156	16	2331 Apr 23	13:14:05	Penumbral	1.3070	-0.5211	172.1			11:48:02	14:40:08					
10492	156	17	2349 May 3	21:07:25	Penumbral	1.2602	-0.4348	186.8			19:34:01	22:40:49					
10537	156	18	2367 May 15	4:53:36	Penumbral	1.2082	-0.3390	201.5			3:12:51	6:34:21					
10582	156	19	2385 May 25	12:32:57	Penumbral	1.1510	-0.2340	216.1			10:44:54	14:21:00					
10627	156	20	2403 Jun 05	20:05:08	Penumbral	1.0884	-0.1195	230.4			18:09:56	22:00:20					
10671	156	21	2421 Jun 16	3:32:46	Partial	1.0225	0.0011	244.0	7.3		1:30:46	5:34:46	3:29:07			3:36:25	
10715	156	22	2439 Jun 27	10:55:58	Partial	0.9531	0.1276	256.9	78.1		8:47:31	13:04:25	10:16:55			11:35:01	
10759	156	23	2457 Jul 07	18:16:32	Partial	0.8822	0.2567	268.8	109.1		16:02:08	20:30:56	17:21:59			19:11:05	
10801	156	24	2475 Jul 19	1:34:32	Partial	0.8096	0.3885	279.9	132.0		23:14:35	3:54:29	0:28:32			2:40:32	
10842	156	25	2493 Jul 29	8:53:05	Partial	0.7379	0.5184	289.8	150.0		6:28:11	11:17:59	7:38:05			10:08:05	
10883	156	26	2511 Aug 10	16:12:02	Partial	0.6669	0.6468	298.8	164.6		13:42:38	18:41:26	14:49:44			17:34:20	
10923	156	27	2529 Aug 20	23:32:24	Partial	0.5976	0.7718	306.8	176.6		20:59:00	2:05:48	22:04:06			1:00:42	
10964	156	28	2547 Sep 01	6:56:14	Partial	0.5317	0.8902	313.7	186.4		4:19:23	9:33:05	5:23:02			8:29:26	
11006	156	29	2565 Sep 11	14:24:12	Total	0.4700	1.0009	319.7	194.2	4.6	11:44:21	17:04:03	12:47:06	14:21:54	14:26:30	16:01:18	
11047	156	30	2583 Sep 22	21:58:06	Total	0.4136	1.1015	324.9	200.5	47.9	19:15:39	0:40:33	20:17:51	21:34:09	22:22:03	23:38:21	
11087	156	31	2601 Oct 04	5:36:14	Total	0.3614	1.1943	329.5	205.6	64.4	2:51:29	8:20:59	3:53:26	5:04:02	6:08:26	7:19:02	
11127	156	32	2619 Oct 15	13:22:29	Total	0.3168	1.2731	333.3	209.5	74.5	10:35:50	16:09:08	11:37:44	12:45:14	13:59:44	15:07:14	
11168	156	33	2637 Oct 25	21:14:11	Total	0.2774	1.3424	336.6	212.6	81.5	18:25:53	0:02:29	19:27:53	20:33:26	21:54:56	23:00:29	
11209	156	34	2655 Nov 06	5:13:36	Total	0.2453	1.3983	339.4	214.9	86.2	2:23:54	8:03:18	3:26:09	4:30:30	5:56:42	7:01:03	
11251	156	35	2673 Nov 16	13:18:11	Total	0.2182	1.4452	342.0	216.8	89.6	10:27:11	16:09:11	11:29:47	12:33:23	14:02:59	15:06:35	
11294	156	36	2691 Nov 27	21:30:20	Total	0.1981	1.4793	344.2	218.2	91.8	18:38:14	0:22:26	19:41:14	20:44:26	22:16:14	23:19:26	
11337	156	37	2709 Dec 09	5:46:36	Total	0.1821	1.5060	346.2	219.3	93.4	2:53:30	8:39:42	3:56:57	4:59:54	6:33:18	7:36:15	
11379	156	38	2727 Dec 20	14:07:35	Total	0.1710	1.5242	348.0	220.3	94.5	11:13:35	17:01:35	12:17:26	13:20:20	14:54:50	15:57:44	
11421	156	39	2745 Dec 30	22:31:19	Total	0.1627	1.5372	349.6	221.1	95.3	19:36:31	1:26:07	20:40:46	21:43:40	23:18:58	0:21:52	
11465	156	40	2764 Jan 11	6:57:46	Total	0.1577	1.5446	351.1	221.8	95.8	4:02:13	9:53:19	5:06:52	6:09:52	7:45:40	8:48:40	
11509	156	41	2782 Jan 21	15:23:04	Total	0.1521	1.5534	352.6	222.5	96.4	12:26:46	18:19:22	13:31:49	14:34:52	16:11:16	17:14:19	
11555	156	42	2800 Feb 01	23:47:11	Total	0.1461	1.5632	353.9	223.2	97.0	20:50:14	2:44:08	21:55:35	22:58:41	0:35:41	1:38:47	
11602	156	43	2818 Feb 12	8:07:36	Total	0.1380	1.5773	355.3	224.1	97.8	5:09:57	11:05:15	6:15:33	7:18:42	8:56:30	9:59:39	
11650	156	44	2836 Feb 23	16:24:26	Total	0.1276	1.5958	356.6	225.0	98.7	13:26:08	19:22:44	14:31:56	15:35:05	17:13:47	18:16:56	
11696	156	45	2854 Mar 06	0:33:07	Total	0.1111	1.6256	358.0	226.0	100.0	21:34:07	3:32:07	22:40:07	23:43:07	1:23:07	2:26:07	
11742	156	46	2872 Mar 16	8:35:55	Total	0.0905	1.6633	359.3	227.1	101.3	5:36:16	11:35:34	6:42:22	7:45:16	9:26:34	10:29:28	
11788	156	47	2890 Mar 27	16:28:28	Total	0.0619	1.7157	360.6	228.2	102.7	13:28:10	19:28:46	14:34:22	15:37:07	17:19:49	18:22:34	
11833	156	48	2908 Apr 08	0:13:40	Total	0.0281	1.7778	361.8	229.2	103.8	21:12:46	3:14:34	22:19:04	23:21:46	1:05:34	2:08:16	
11878	156	49	2926 Apr 19	7:46:46	Total	-0.0147	1.8026	362.7	229.9	104.2	4:45:25	10:48:07	5:51:49	6:54:40	8:38:52	9:41:43	
11923	156	50	2944 Apr 29	15:12:15	Total	-0.0632	1.7139	363.4	230.1	103.5	12:10:33	18:13:57	13:17:12	14:20:30	16:04:00	17:07:18	
11969	156	51	2962 May 10	22:26:26	Total	-0.1203	1.6092	363.5	229.5	101.1	19:24:41	1:28:11	20:31:41	21:35:53	23:16:59	0:21:11	
12014	156	52	2980 May 21	5:32:38	Total	-0.1833	1.4937	362.9	227.8	96.1	2:31:11	8:34:05	3:38:44	4:44:35	6:20:41	7:26:32	
12058	156	53	2998 Jun 01	12:29:09	Total	-0.2536	1.3646	361.5	224.6	87.2	9:28:24	15:29:54	10:36:51	11:45:33	13:12:45	14:21:27	

== See also ==
- List of lunar eclipses
  - List of Saros series for lunar eclipses
