= Solar eclipse of October 14, 2042 =

Future annular solar eclipse

- Annular eclipse
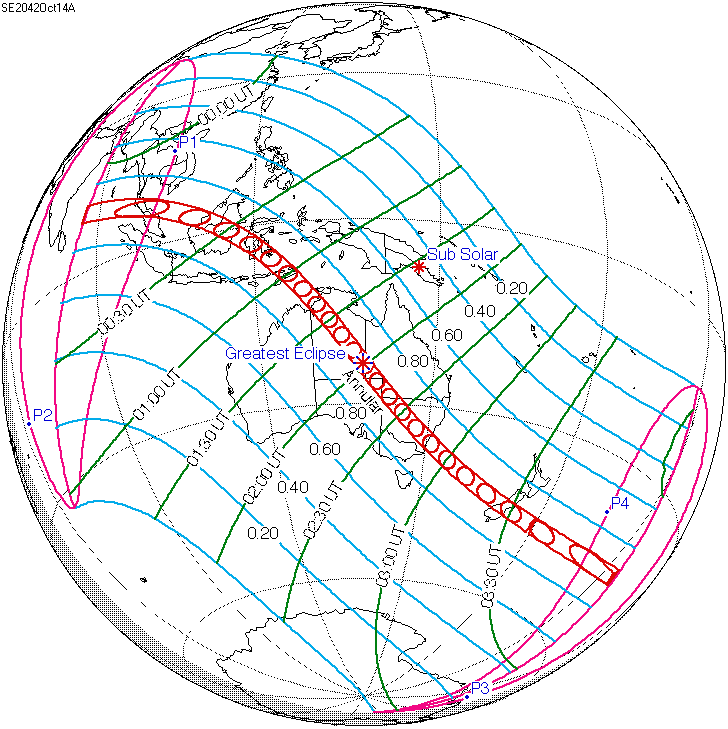
- Map
- Gamma: −0.303
- Magnitude: 0.93

Maximum eclipse
- Duration: 464 s (7 min 44 s)
- Coordinates: 23.7°S 137.8°E
- Max. width of band: 273 km (170 mi)

Times (UTC)
- Greatest eclipse: 2:00:42

References
- Saros: 144 (18 of 70)
- Catalog # (SE5000): 9602

An annular solar eclipse will occur at the Moon's descending node of orbit on Tuesday, October 14, 2042, with a magnitude of 0.93. A solar eclipse occurs when the Moon passes between Earth and the Sun, thereby totally or partly obscuring the image of the Sun for a viewer on Earth. An annular solar eclipse occurs when the Moon's apparent diameter is smaller than the Sun's, blocking most of the Sun's light and causing the Sun to look like an annulus (ring). An annular eclipse appears as a partial eclipse over a region of the Earth thousands of kilometres wide. Occurring about 9 hours before apogee (on October 14, 2042, at 11:00 UTC), the Moon's apparent diameter will be smaller.

The path of annularity will be visible from parts of the Andaman and Nicobar Islands, southern Thailand, Malaysia, Indonesia, East Timor, Australia, and New Zealand. A partial solar eclipse will be visible for parts of South Asia, Southeast Asia, Australia, Oceania, and Antarctica.

== Images ==
Animated path

== Eclipse timing ==
=== Places experiencing annular eclipse ===
Solar Eclipse of October 14, 2042 (Local Times)
Country or territory	City or place	Start of partial eclipse	Start of annular eclipse	Maximum eclipse	End of annular eclipse	End of partial eclipse	Duration of annularity (min:s)	Duration of eclipse (hr:min)	Maximum coverage
Thailand	Phuket	06:13:38 (sunrise)	07:05:52	07:08:52	07:11:53	08:27:26	6:01	2:14	84.68%
Thailand	Hat Yai	06:04:49 (sunrise)	07:07:20	07:10:25	07:13:30	08:30:39	6:10	2:26	84.80%
Malaysia	Kangar	07:05:35 (sunrise)	08:08:07	08:10:57	08:13:47	09:31:11	5:40	2:26	84.80%
Malaysia	Alor Setar	07:04:44 (sunrise)	08:08:49	08:11:22	08:13:54	09:31:48	5:05	2:27	84.81%
Malaysia	Kota Bharu	07:01:18	08:09:01	08:12:06	08:15:10	09:33:52	6:09	2:37	84.90%
Malaysia	Kuala Terengganu	07:01:59	08:10:38	08:13:25	08:16:12	09:36:04	5:34	2:34	84.96%
Malaysia	Kuching	07:06:26	08:21:03	08:23:04	08:25:03	09:52:29	4:00	2:46	85.39%
Malaysia	Sarikei	07:05:53	08:19:48	08:23:05	08:26:22	09:53:12	6:34	2:47	85.43%
Malaysia	Sibu	07:05:44	08:19:48	08:23:05	08:26:21	09:53:22	6:33	2:48	85.44%
Indonesia	Samarinda	07:10:59	08:29:37	08:32:40	08:35:41	10:08:07	6:04	2:57	85.75%
Indonesia	Balikpapan	07:11:58	08:30:19	08:33:43	08:37:08	10:09:19	6:49	2:57	85.76%
Indonesia	Mamuju	07:15:02	08:35:13	08:38:40	08:42:08	10:16:22	6:55	3:01	85.88%
Indonesia	Rantepao	07:16:00	08:37:05	08:40:26	08:43:46	10:18:58	6:41	3:03	85.93%
Indonesia	Kendari	07:19:08	08:44:36	08:45:41	08:46:45	10:26:25	2:09	3:07	86.06%
Timor-Leste	Dili	08:29:39	09:56:32	10:00:07	10:03:42	11:44:29	7:10	3:15	86.27%
Timor-Leste	Baucau	08:30:08	09:58:27	10:01:10	10:03:51	11:46:00	5:24	3:16	86.30%
Timor-Leste	Same	08:30:36	09:57:39	10:01:16	10:04:55	11:45:49	7:16	3:15	86.28%
Timor-Leste	Suai	08:30:56	09:58:07	10:01:26	10:04:47	11:45:49	6:40	3:15	86.27%
Australia	Tennant Creek	09:32:56	11:08:34	11:12:20	11:16:05	13:01:30	7:31	3:29	86.61%
Australia	Cobar	11:49:09	13:29:18	13:32:55	13:36:32	15:17:01	7:14	3:28	86.52%
Australia	Parkes	11:56:56	13:37:17	13:40:35	13:43:53	15:22:57	6:36	3:26	86.46%
Australia	Orange	11:58:52	13:40:37	13:42:38	13:44:39	15:24:36	4:02	3:26	86.45%
Australia	Bathurst	12:00:02	13:43:15	13:43:47	13:44:22	15:25:30	1:07	3:25	86.44%
Australia	Canberra	12:03:21	13:42:31	13:46:04	13:49:35	15:26:34	7:04	3:23	86.40%
Australia	Bowral	12:03:50	13:44:29	13:47:12	13:49:55	15:27:51	5:26	3:24	86.40%
Australia	Wollongong	12:04:35	13:46:46	13:48:01	13:49:17	15:28:32	2:31	3:24	86.39%
Australia	Nowra	12:05:01	13:44:58	13:48:11	13:51:24	15:28:30	6:26	3:23	86.39%
Australia	Kiama	12:05:02	13:45:55	13:48:20	13:50:46	15:28:42	4:51	3:24	86.39%
New Zealand	Queenstown	14:52:38	16:24:52	16:25:50	16:26:49	17:51:01	1:57	2:58	85.70%
New Zealand	Christchurch	14:57:56	16:28:39	16:30:39	16:32:39	17:54:23	4:00	2:56	85.60%

=== Places experiencing partial eclipse ===
Solar Eclipse of October 14, 2042 (Local Times)
Country or territory	City or place	Start of partial eclipse	Maximum eclipse	End of partial eclipse	Duration of eclipse (hr:min)	Maximum coverage
Vietnam	Hanoi	05:57:02	07:00:23	08:11:32	2:15	43.16%
Bangladesh	Dhaka	05:55:06 (sunrise)	06:00:47	07:02:45	1:08	45.12%
Myanmar	Yangon	05:57:47 (sunrise)	06:31:23	07:43:53	1:46	64.15%
Laos	Vientiane	06:02:42 (sunrise)	07:01:31	08:15:29	2:13	55.46%
China	Haikou	06:57:24	08:02:20	09:15:33	2:18	41.64%
Hong Kong	Hong Kong	07:00:17	08:02:23	09:11:45	2:11	31.11%
Bhutan	Thimphu	06:00:41 (sunrise)	06:03:08	06:57:18	0:57	33.50%
China	Sanya	06:56:36	08:03:19	09:18:53	2:22	47.81%
Thailand	Bangkok	06:08:37 (sunrise)	07:04:07	08:20:53	2:12	70.58%
India	Port Blair	05:09:23 (sunrise)	05:34:42	06:48:22	1:39	82.32%
India	Kolkata	05:32:36 (sunrise)	05:34:57	06:33:58	1:01	48.73%
Cambodia	Phnom Penh	05:57:12	07:07:20	08:27:54	2:31	73.01%
Vietnam	Ho Chi Minh City	05:57:36	07:08:52	08:30:57	2:33	73.47%
Philippines	Manila	07:01:26	08:13:11	09:34:58	2:34	43.06%
Malaysia	Kuala Lumpur	07:04:32	08:15:29	09:37:34	2:33	81.09%
Singapore	Singapore	07:06:40	08:19:08	09:43:13	2:37	78.49%
Nepal	Kathmandu	06:03:10 (sunrise)	06:05:37	06:42:03	0:39	25.50%
Brunei	Bandar Seri Begawan	07:03:34	08:21:36	09:52:28	2:49	79.16%
Sri Lanka	Sri Jayawardenepura Kotte	05:56:57 (sunrise)	05:59:08	06:47:06	0:50	54.82%
Indonesia	Jakarta	06:18:32	07:33:11	09:00:00	2:41	63.35%
Palau	Ngerulmud	08:19:15	09:37:30	11:06:03	2:47	35.06%
Christmas Island	Flying Fish Cove	06:27:13	07:40:10	09:04:31	2:37	51.95%
Indonesia	Makassar	07:19:28	08:44:19	10:23:17	3:04	85.78%
Papua New Guinea	Port Moresby	10:05:50	11:39:38	13:20:44	3:15	38.64%
Australia	Melbourne	12:02:55	13:42:30	15:21:23	3:18	76.45%
Australia	Sydney	12:03:59	13:47:43	15:28:28	3:24	85.37%
Norfolk Island	Kingston	13:38:21	15:15:13	16:42:13	3:04	45.88%
New Zealand	Auckland	14:58:54	16:32:26	17:55:25	2:57	64.38%
New Zealand	Wellington	15:00:27	16:33:11	17:56:11	2:56	79.03%
New Zealand	Chatham Islands	16:00:00	17:26:50	18:44:25	2:44	83.39%

== Eclipse details ==
Shown below are two tables displaying details about this particular solar eclipse. The first table outlines times at which the Moon's penumbra or umbra attains the specific parameter, and the second table describes various other parameters pertaining to this eclipse.

October 14, 2042 Solar Eclipse Times
Event	Time (UTC)
First Penumbral External Contact	2042 October 13 at 22:57:13.3 UTC
First Umbral External Contact	2042 October 14 at 00:04:10.2 UTC
First Central Line	2042 October 14 at 00:07:16.8 UTC
First Umbral Internal Contact	2042 October 14 at 00:10:23.8 UTC
First Penumbral Internal Contact	2042 October 14 at 01:24:38.8 UTC
Greatest Eclipse	2042 October 14 at 02:00:41.9 UTC
Ecliptic Conjunction	2042 October 14 at 02:04:20.6 UTC
Greatest Duration	2042 October 14 at 02:14:59.1 UTC
Equatorial Conjunction	2042 October 14 at 02:19:43.8 UTC
Last Penumbral Internal Contact	2042 October 14 at 02:36:17.2 UTC
Last Umbral Internal Contact	2042 October 14 at 03:50:47.6 UTC
Last Central Line	2042 October 14 at 03:53:55.3 UTC
Last Umbral External Contact	2042 October 14 at 03:57:02.4 UTC
Last Penumbral External Contact	2042 October 14 at 05:04:03.6 UTC

October 14, 2042 Solar Eclipse Parameters
Parameter	Value
Eclipse Magnitude	0.93005
Eclipse Obscuration	0.86500
Gamma	−0.30304
Sun Right Ascension	13h17m05.8s
Sun Declination	-08°08'35.1"
Sun Semi-Diameter	16'01.9"
Sun Equatorial Horizontal Parallax	08.8"
Moon Right Ascension	13h16m35.0s
Moon Declination	-08°23'00.1"
Moon Semi-Diameter	14'41.9"
Moon Equatorial Horizontal Parallax	0°53'56.6"
ΔT	80.0 s

== Eclipse season ==
This eclipse is part of an eclipse season, a period, roughly every six months, when eclipses occur. Only two (or occasionally three) eclipse seasons occur each year, and each season lasts about 35 days and repeats just short of six months (173 days) later; thus two full eclipse seasons always occur each year. Either two or three eclipses happen each eclipse season. In the sequence below, each eclipse is separated by a fortnight. The first and last eclipse in this sequence is separated by one synodic month.

Eclipse season of September–October 2042
September 29 Ascending node (full moon)	October 14 Descending node (new moon)	October 28 Ascending node (full moon)
Penumbral lunar eclipse Lunar Saros 118	Annular solar eclipse Solar Saros 144	Penumbral lunar eclipse Lunar Saros 156

== Related eclipses ==
=== Eclipses in 2042 ===
- A penumbral lunar eclipse on April 5.
- A total solar eclipse on April 20.
- A penumbral lunar eclipse on September 29.
- An annular solar eclipse on October 14.
- A penumbral lunar eclipse on October 28.

=== Metonic ===
- Preceded by: Solar eclipse of December 26, 2038
- Followed by: Solar eclipse of August 2, 2046

=== Tzolkinex ===
- Preceded by: Solar eclipse of September 2, 2035
- Followed by: Solar eclipse of November 25, 2049

=== Half-Saros ===
- Preceded by: Lunar eclipse of October 8, 2033
- Followed by: Lunar eclipse of October 19, 2051

=== Tritos ===
- Preceded by: Solar eclipse of November 14, 2031
- Followed by: Solar eclipse of September 12, 2053

=== Solar Saros 144 ===
- Preceded by: Solar eclipse of October 2, 2024
- Followed by: Solar eclipse of October 24, 2060

=== Inex ===
- Preceded by: Solar eclipse of November 3, 2013
- Followed by: Solar eclipse of September 23, 2071

=== Triad ===
- Preceded by: Solar eclipse of December 14, 1955
- Followed by: Solar eclipse of August 15, 2129

=== Solar eclipses of 2040–2043 ===
This eclipse is a member of a semester series. An eclipse in a semester series of solar eclipses repeats approximately every 177 days and 4 hours (a semester) at alternating nodes of the Moon's orbit.

Solar eclipse series sets from 2040 to 2043
Ascending node			Descending node		
Saros	Map	Gamma	Saros	Map	Gamma
119	May 11, 2040 Partial	−1.2529	124	November 4, 2040 Partial	1.0993
129	April 30, 2041 Total	−0.4492	134	October 25, 2041 Annular	0.4133
139	April 20, 2042 Total	0.2956	144	October 14, 2042 Annular	−0.303
149	April 9, 2043 Total (non-central)	1.0031	154	October 3, 2043 Annular (non-central)	1.0102

=== Saros 144 ===
This eclipse is a part of Saros series 144, repeating every 18 years, 11 days, and containing 70 events. The series started with a partial solar eclipse on April 11, 1736. It contains annular eclipses from July 7, 1880 through August 27, 2565. There are no hybrid or total eclipses in this set. The series ends at member 70 as a partial eclipse on May 5, 2980. Its eclipses are tabulated in three columns; every third eclipse in the same column is one exeligmos apart, so they all cast shadows over approximately the same parts of the Earth.

The longest duration of annularity will be produced by member 51 at 9 minutes, 52 seconds on December 29, 2168. All eclipses in this series occur at the Moon’s descending node of orbit.

Series members 5–26 occur between 1801 and 2200:
5	6	7
May 25, 1808	June 5, 1826	June 16, 1844
8	9	10
June 27, 1862	July 7, 1880	July 18, 1898
11	12	13
July 30, 1916	August 10, 1934	August 20, 1952
14	15	16
August 31, 1970	September 11, 1988	September 22, 2006
17	18	19
October 2, 2024	October 14, 2042	October 24, 2060
20	21	22
November 4, 2078	November 15, 2096	November 27, 2114
23	24	25
December 7, 2132	December 19, 2150	December 29, 2168
26
January 9, 2187

=== Metonic series ===
The metonic series repeats eclipses every 19 years (6939.69 days), lasting about 5 cycles. Eclipses occur in nearly the same calendar date. In addition, the octon subseries repeats 1/5 of that or every 3.8 years (1387.94 days). All eclipses in this table occur at the Moon's descending node.

21 eclipse events between May 21, 1993 and May 20, 2069
May 20–21	March 9	December 25–26	October 13–14	August 1–2
118	120	122	124	126
May 21, 1993	March 9, 1997	December 25, 2000	October 14, 2004	August 1, 2008
128	130	132	134	136
May 20, 2012	March 9, 2016	December 26, 2019	October 14, 2023	August 2, 2027
138	140	142	144	146
May 21, 2031	March 9, 2035	December 26, 2038	October 14, 2042	August 2, 2046
148	150	152	154	156
May 20, 2050	March 9, 2054	December 26, 2057	October 13, 2061	August 2, 2065
158
May 20, 2069

=== Tritos series ===
This eclipse is a part of a tritos cycle, repeating at alternating nodes every 135 synodic months (≈ 3986.63 days, or 11 years minus 1 month). Their appearance and longitude are irregular due to a lack of synchronization with the anomalistic month (period of perigee), but groupings of 3 tritos cycles (≈ 33 years minus 3 months) come close (≈ 434.044 anomalistic months), so eclipses are similar in these groupings.

Series members between 1801 and 2200
August 28, 1802 (Saros 122)	July 27, 1813 (Saros 123)	June 26, 1824 (Saros 124)	May 27, 1835 (Saros 125)	April 25, 1846 (Saros 126)
March 25, 1857 (Saros 127)	February 23, 1868 (Saros 128)	January 22, 1879 (Saros 129)	December 22, 1889 (Saros 130)	November 22, 1900 (Saros 131)
October 22, 1911 (Saros 132)	September 21, 1922 (Saros 133)	August 21, 1933 (Saros 134)	July 20, 1944 (Saros 135)	June 20, 1955 (Saros 136)
May 20, 1966 (Saros 137)	April 18, 1977 (Saros 138)	March 18, 1988 (Saros 139)	February 16, 1999 (Saros 140)	January 15, 2010 (Saros 141)
December 14, 2020 (Saros 142)	November 14, 2031 (Saros 143)	October 14, 2042 (Saros 144)	September 12, 2053 (Saros 145)	August 12, 2064 (Saros 146)
July 13, 2075 (Saros 147)	June 11, 2086 (Saros 148)	May 11, 2097 (Saros 149)	April 11, 2108 (Saros 150)	March 11, 2119 (Saros 151)
February 8, 2130 (Saros 152)	January 8, 2141 (Saros 153)	December 8, 2151 (Saros 154)	November 7, 2162 (Saros 155)	October 7, 2173 (Saros 156)
September 4, 2184 (Saros 157)	August 5, 2195 (Saros 158)			

=== Inex series ===
This eclipse is a part of the long period inex cycle, repeating at alternating nodes, every 358 synodic months (≈ 10,571.95 days, or 29 years minus 20 days). Their appearance and longitude are irregular due to a lack of synchronization with the anomalistic month (period of perigee). However, groupings of 3 inex cycles (≈ 87 years minus 2 months) comes close (≈ 1,151.02 anomalistic months), so eclipses are similar in these groupings.

Series members between 1801 and 2200
March 24, 1811 (Saros 136)	March 4, 1840 (Saros 137)	February 11, 1869 (Saros 138)
January 22, 1898 (Saros 139)	January 3, 1927 (Saros 140)	December 14, 1955 (Saros 141)
November 22, 1984 (Saros 142)	November 3, 2013 (Saros 143)	October 14, 2042 (Saros 144)
September 23, 2071 (Saros 145)	September 4, 2100 (Saros 146)	August 15, 2129 (Saros 147)
July 25, 2158 (Saros 148)	July 6, 2187 (Saros 149)	
