= October 2042 lunar eclipse =

Extremely short possible lunar eclipse

- Penumbral eclipse
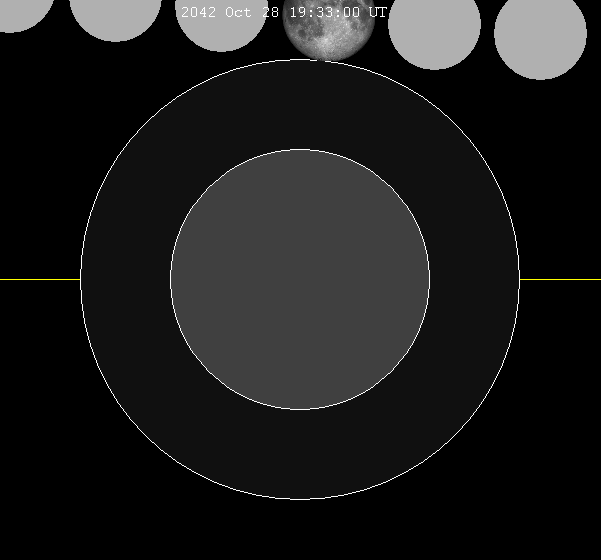
- The Moon's hourly motion shown right to left
- Date: October 28, 2042
- Gamma: 1.557
- Magnitude: −0.9738
- Saros cycle: 156 (− of 81)
- Penumbral: 24 minutes, 22 seconds
Contacts (UTC)
- P1: 19:21:08
- Greatest: 19:32:51
- P4: 19:44:29

A penumbral lunar eclipse will occur at the Moon’s ascending node of orbit on Tuesday, October 28, 2042. with an umbral magnitude of −0.9738. A lunar eclipse occurs when the Moon moves into the Earth's shadow, causing the Moon to be darkened. A penumbral lunar eclipse occurs when part or all of the Moon's near side passes into the Earth's penumbra. Unlike a solar eclipse, which can only be viewed from a relatively small area of the world, a lunar eclipse may be viewed from anywhere on the night side of Earth. Occurring only about 12 hours before perigee (on October 28, 2042, at 7:30 UTC), the Moon's apparent diameter will be larger.

This event marks the beginning of lunar saros cycle 156 according to some sources, and will be visually imperceptible to the naked eye. Many other sources denote this eclipse as a miss.

According to some sources, it will be the last of 5 metonic cycle eclipses occurring every 19 years on October 28, while the other sources calculate the Moon will miss the shadow.

== Visibility ==
The eclipse will be completely visible over much of Africa, Europe, Asia, and western Australia.

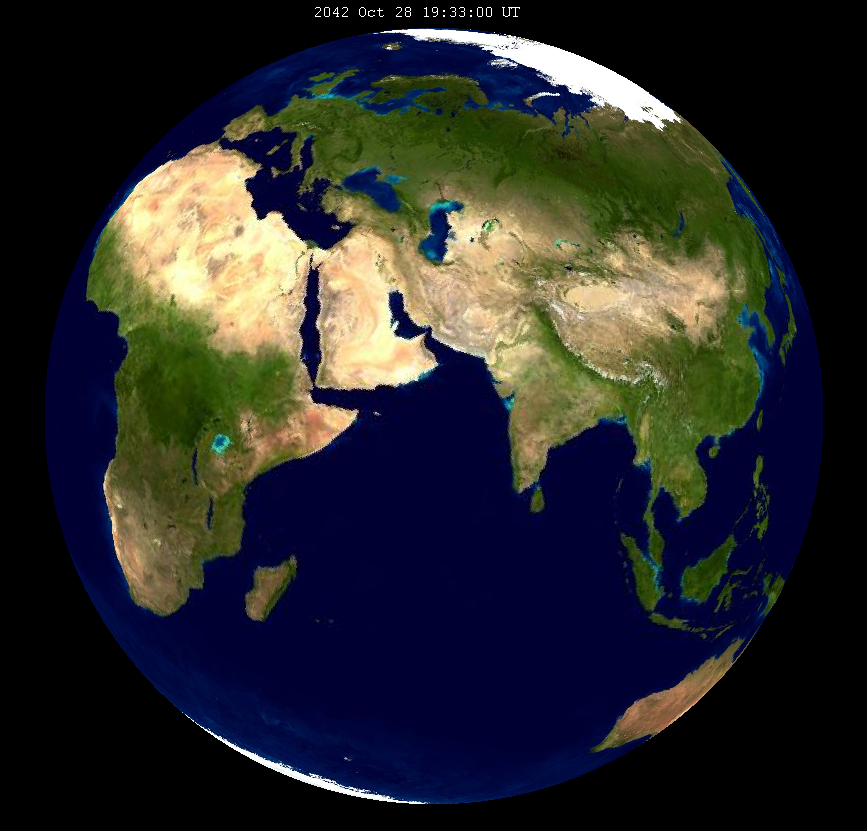
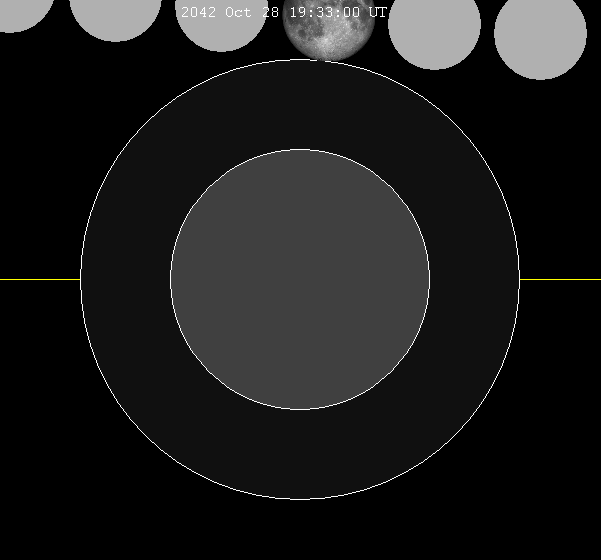

== Eclipse season ==
This eclipse is part of an eclipse season, a period, roughly every six months, when eclipses occur. Only two (or occasionally three) eclipse seasons occur each year, and each season lasts about 35 days and repeats just short of six months (173 days) later; thus two full eclipse seasons always occur each year. Either two or three eclipses happen each eclipse season. In the sequence below, each eclipse is separated by a fortnight. The first and last eclipse in this sequence is separated by one synodic month.

Eclipse season of September–October 2042
September 29 Ascending node (full moon)	October 14 Descending node (new moon)	October 28 Ascending node (full moon)
Penumbral lunar eclipse Lunar Saros 118	Annular solar eclipse Solar Saros 144	Penumbral lunar eclipse Lunar Saros 156

== Related eclipses ==
=== Eclipses in 2042 ===
- A penumbral lunar eclipse on April 5.
- A total solar eclipse on April 20.
- A penumbral lunar eclipse on September 29.
- An annular solar eclipse on October 14.
- A penumbral lunar eclipse on October 28.

=== Lunar Saros 156 ===
- Followed by: Lunar eclipse of November 8, 2060

=== Lunar eclipses of 2038–2042 ===
This eclipse is a member of a semester series. An eclipse in a semester series of lunar eclipses repeats approximately every 177 days and 4 hours (a semester) at alternating nodes of the Moon's orbit.

The penumbral lunar eclipses on January 21, 2038 and July 16, 2038 occur in the previous lunar year eclipse set, and the penumbral lunar eclipses on April 5, 2042 and September 29, 2042 occur in the next lunar year eclipse set.

Lunar eclipse series sets from 2038 to 2042
Descending node				Ascending node			
Saros	Date Viewing	Type Chart	Gamma	Saros	Date Viewing	Type Chart	Gamma
111	2038 Jun 17	Penumbral	1.3082	116	2038 Dec 11	Penumbral	−1.1448
121	2039 Jun 06	Partial	0.5460	126	2039 Nov 30	Partial	−0.4721
131	2040 May 26	Total	−0.1872	136	2040 Nov 18	Total	0.2361
141	2041 May 16	Partial	−0.9746	146	2041 Nov 08	Partial	0.9212
				156	2042 Oct 28	Penumbral	−

=== Metonic series ===
The metonic cycle repeats nearly exactly every 19 years and represents a Saros cycle plus one lunar year. Because it occurs on the same calendar date, the Earth's shadow will in nearly the same location relative to the background stars.

Metonic events: May 4 and October 28
Descending node	Ascending node
1. 1966 May 4 - Penumbral (111); 2. 1985 May 4 - Total (121); 3. 2004 May 4 - Total (131); 4. 2023 May 5 - Penumbral (141)	1. 1966 Oct 29 - Penumbral (116); 2. 1985 Oct 28 - Total (126); 3. 2004 Oct 28 - Total (136); 4. 2023 Oct 28 - Partial (146); 5. 2042 Oct 28 - Penumbral (156)

=== Tritos series ===
This eclipse is a part of a tritos cycle, repeating at alternating nodes every 135 synodic months (≈ 3986.63 days, or 11 years minus 1 month). Their appearance and longitude are irregular due to a lack of synchronization with the anomalistic month (period of perigee), but groupings of 3 tritos cycles (≈ 33 years minus 3 months) come close (≈ 434.044 anomalistic months), so eclipses are similar in these groupings.

Series members between 1801 and 2042
1802 Sep 11 (Saros 134)	1813 Aug 12 (Saros 135)	1824 Jul 11 (Saros 136)	1835 Jun 10 (Saros 137)	1846 May 11 (Saros 138)
1857 Apr 09 (Saros 139)	1868 Mar 08 (Saros 140)	1879 Feb 07 (Saros 141)	1890 Jan 06 (Saros 142)	1900 Dec 06 (Saros 143)
1911 Nov 06 (Saros 144)	1922 Oct 06 (Saros 145)	1933 Sep 04 (Saros 146)	1944 Aug 04 (Saros 147)	
		2042 Oct 28 (Saros 156)		

== See also ==
- List of lunar eclipses and List of 21st-century lunar eclipses
- February 1951 lunar eclipse
- August 2016 lunar eclipse
