= Solar eclipse of April 20, 2042 =

Total eclipse

- Total eclipse
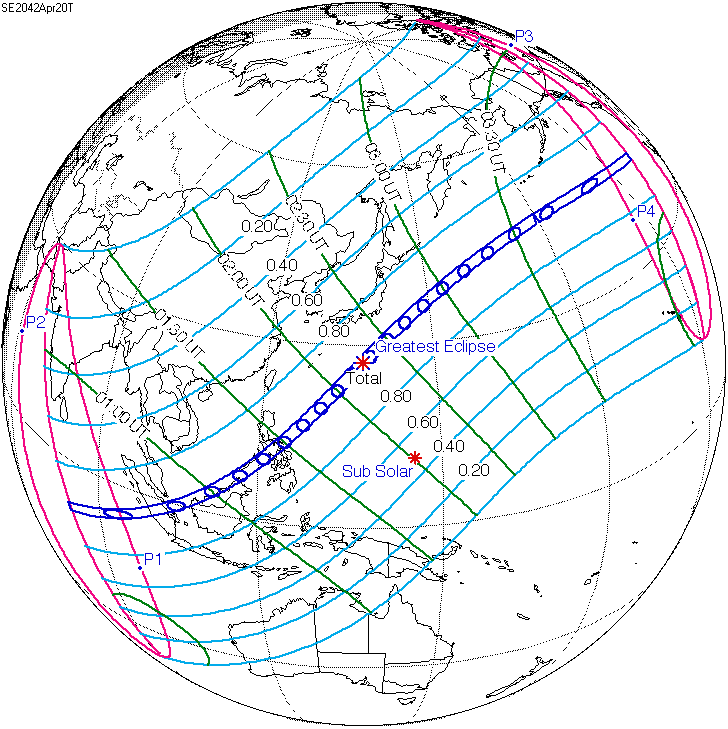
- Map
- Gamma: 0.2956
- Magnitude: 1.0614

Maximum eclipse
- Duration: 291 s (4 min 51 s)
- Coordinates: 27°N 137.3°E
- Max. width of band: 210 km (130 mi)

Times (UTC)
- Greatest eclipse: 2:17:30

References
- Saros: 139 (31 of 71)
- Catalog # (SE5000): 9601

A total solar eclipse will occur at the Moon's ascending node of orbit between Saturday, April 19 and Sunday, April 20, 2042, with a magnitude of 1.0614. A solar eclipse occurs when the Moon passes between Earth and the Sun, thereby totally or partly obscuring the image of the Sun for a viewer on Earth. A total solar eclipse occurs when the Moon's apparent diameter is larger than the Sun's, blocking all direct sunlight, turning day into darkness. Totality occurs in a narrow path across Earth's surface, with the partial solar eclipse visible over a surrounding region thousands of kilometres wide. Occurring about 21 hours after perigee (on April 19, 2042, at 5:25 UTC), the Moon's apparent diameter will be larger.

The path of totality will be visible from parts of western Indonesia (particularly Sumatra), eastern Malaysia, Brunei and the Philippines. A partial solar eclipse will be visible for parts of South Asia, Southeast Asia, northern Australia, East Asia, Northeast Asia, Hawaii, and northwestern North America.

== Images ==
Animated path

== Eclipse timing ==
=== Places experiencing total eclipse ===
Solar Eclipse of April 20, 2042 (Local Times)
Country or territory	City or place	Start of partial eclipse	Start of total eclipse	Maximum eclipse	End of total eclipse	End of partial eclipse	Duration of totality (min:s)	Duration of eclipse (hr:min)	Maximum magnitude
Indonesia	Jambi	06:47:37	07:45:55	07:47:30	07:49:06	08:54:02	3:11	2:06	1.0259
Malaysia	Kuching	07:52:19	08:54:21	08:55:39	08:56:57	10:06:16	2:36	2:14	1.0092
Malaysia	Sarikei	07:53:22	08:56:25	08:57:20	08:58:16	10:08:42	1:51	2:15	1.0042
Malaysia	Sibu	07:53:40	08:57:01	08:57:48	08:58:35	10:09:21	1:34	2:16	1.003
Malaysia	Miri	07:57:11	09:01:00	09:02:44	09:04:29	10:15:53	3:29	2:19	1.0176
Brunei	Kuala Belait	07:57:32	09:01:30	09:03:15	09:05:00	10:16:34	3:30	2:19	1.0179
Brunei	Tutong	07:58:01	09:02:17	09:03:58	09:05:39	10:17:33	3:22	2:20	1.0155
Brunei	Bandar Seri Begawan	07:58:16	09:02:48	09:04:22	09:05:56	10:18:07	3:08	2:20	1.0124
Malaysia	Labuan	07:58:56	09:03:31	09:05:15	09:06:59	10:19:14	3:28	2:20	1.0164
Malaysia	Papar	07:59:54	09:04:58	09:06:38	09:08:19	10:21:05	3:21	2:21	1.0144
Malaysia	Kota Kinabalu	08:00:19	09:05:23	09:07:10	09:08:58	10:21:45	3:35	2:21	1.0176
Philippines	Puerto Princesa	08:07:26	09:15:07	09:16:18	09:17:29	10:32:55	2:22	2:25	1.0057
Philippines	Kalibo	08:13:05	09:22:02	09:24:07	09:26:13	10:42:51	4:11	2:30	1.0233
Philippines	Legazpi	08:16:35	09:26:23	09:28:33	09:30:44	10:48:05	4:21	2:32	1.0257

=== Places experiencing partial eclipse ===
Solar Eclipse of April 20, 2042 (Local Times)
Country or territory	City or place	Start of partial eclipse	Maximum eclipse	End of partial eclipse	Duration of eclipse (hr:min)	Maximum coverage
Cocos (Keeling) Islands	Bantam	06:10:53	07:05:38	08:05:40	1:58	76.69%
Christmas Island	Flying Fish Cove	06:42:08	07:39:32	08:42:48	2:01	70.06%
Indonesia	Jakarta	06:44:24	07:44:08	08:50:21	2:06	83.36%
Singapore	Singapore	07:50:48	08:51:07	09:58:10	2:07	95.32%
Sri Lanka	Sri Jayawardenepura Kotte	06:00:15 (sunrise)	06:21:18	07:12:16	1:12	47.13%
Malaysia	Kuala Lumpur	07:53:05	08:52:21	09:58:07	2:05	85.59%
Maldives	Malé	05:58:07 (sunrise)	06:00:18	06:38:41	0:41	45.20%
Cambodia	Phnom Penh	07:06:30	08:06:31	09:12:57	2:06	66.09%
Vietnam	Ho Chi Minh City	07:05:12	08:06:38	09:14:44	2:10	71.78%
Thailand	Bangkok	07:10:41	08:06:49	09:08:32	1:58	52.45%
Myanmar	Yangon	06:47:43	07:39:01	08:34:53	1:47	38.32%
Laos	Vientiane	07:19:20	08:15:16	09:16:30	1:57	45.48%
Vietnam	Hanoi	07:26:06	08:23:20	09:25:53	2:00	44.18%
Philippines	Manila	08:17:11	09:27:48	10:45:51	2:29	94.39%
Palau	Ngerulmud	09:21:30	10:33:07	11:51:13	2:30	57.98%
Macau	Macau	08:29:37	09:33:18	10:42:59	2:13	56.98%
Hong Kong	Hong Kong	08:30:02	09:34:14	10:44:29	2:14	58.12%
Taiwan	Taipei	08:39:08	09:48:38	11:04:03	2:25	68.99%
China	Shanghai	08:53:33	10:00:17	11:11:41	2:18	54.62%
Guam	Hagåtña	10:49:41	12:03:15	13:20:39	2:31	45.64%
China	Beijing	09:14:15	10:09:20	11:07:17	1:53	27.90%
South Korea	Seoul	10:11:36	11:18:59	12:29:36	2:18	52.47%
North Korea	Pyongyang	10:14:32	11:19:42	12:27:55	2:13	46.73%
Japan	Tokyo	10:18:09	11:35:00	12:53:41	2:36	85.84%
Russia	Yuzhno-Sakhalinsk	12:43:58	13:52:59	15:02:07	2:18	58.21%
Russia	Petropavlovsk-Kamchatsky	14:08:26	15:14:57	16:19:37	2:11	59.71%
United States	Adak (Note: The times listed for this location occur on April 19, 2042, local time.)	17:31:44	18:37:11	19:38:50	2:07	79.59%
United States	Anchorage	18:47:28	19:38:43	20:27:54	1:40	44.28%
United States	Unalaska	18:40:03	19:41:26	20:39:20	1:59	72.76%
Canada	Prince Rupert	19:54:18	20:44:29	20:52:25 (sunset)	0:58	56.59%

== Eclipse details ==
Shown below are two tables displaying details about this particular solar eclipse. The first table outlines times at which the Moon's penumbra or umbra attains the specific parameter, and the second table describes various other parameters pertaining to this eclipse.

April 20, 2042 Solar Eclipse Times
Event	Time (UTC)
First Penumbral External Contact	2042 April 19 at 23:41:45.0 UTC
First Umbral External Contact	2042 April 20 at 00:37:26.5 UTC
First Central Line	2042 April 20 at 00:38:41.2 UTC
First Umbral Internal Contact	2042 April 20 at 00:39:55.9 UTC
First Penumbral Internal Contact	2042 April 20 at 01:40:21.0 UTC
Greatest Eclipse	2042 April 20 at 02:17:30.1 UTC
Ecliptic Conjunction	2042 April 20 at 02:20:31.9 UTC
Greatest Duration	2042 April 20 at 02:21:20.1 UTC
Equatorial Conjunction	2042 April 20 at 02:32:33.0 UTC
Last Penumbral Internal Contact	2042 April 20 at 02:54:18.5 UTC
Last Umbral Internal Contact	2042 April 20 at 03:54:56.1 UTC
Last Central Line	2042 April 20 at 03:56:09.9 UTC
Last Umbral External Contact	2042 April 20 at 03:57:23.7 UTC
Last Penumbral External Contact	2042 April 20 at 04:53:11.4 UTC

April 20, 2042 Solar Eclipse Parameters
Parameter	Value
Eclipse Magnitude	1.06144
Eclipse Obscuration	1.12666
Gamma	0.29559
Sun Right Ascension	01h52m12.4s
Sun Declination	+11°31'19.4"
Sun Semi-Diameter	15'55.3"
Sun Equatorial Horizontal Parallax	08.8"
Moon Right Ascension	01h51m39.9s
Moon Declination	+11°47'27.9"
Moon Semi-Diameter	16'37.6"
Moon Equatorial Horizontal Parallax	1°01'01.4"
ΔT	79.8 s

== Eclipse season ==
This eclipse is part of an eclipse season, a period, roughly every six months, when eclipses occur. Only two (or occasionally three) eclipse seasons occur each year, and each season lasts about 35 days and repeats just short of six months (173 days) later; thus two full eclipse seasons always occur each year. Either two or three eclipses happen each eclipse season. In the sequence below, each eclipse is separated by a fortnight.

Eclipse season of April 2042
April 5 Descending node (full moon)	April 20 Ascending node (new moon)
Penumbral lunar eclipse Lunar Saros 113	Total solar eclipse Solar Saros 139

== Related eclipses ==
=== Eclipses in 2042 ===
- A penumbral lunar eclipse on April 5.
- A total solar eclipse on April 20.
- A penumbral lunar eclipse on September 29.
- An annular solar eclipse on October 14.
- A penumbral lunar eclipse on October 28.

=== Metonic ===
- Preceded by: Solar eclipse of July 2, 2038
- Followed by: Solar eclipse of February 5, 2046

=== Tzolkinex ===
- Preceded by: Solar eclipse of March 9, 2035
- Followed by: Solar eclipse of May 31, 2049

=== Half-Saros ===
- Preceded by: Lunar eclipse of April 14, 2033
- Followed by: Lunar eclipse of April 26, 2051

=== Tritos ===
- Preceded by: Solar eclipse of May 21, 2031
- Followed by: Solar eclipse of March 20, 2053

=== Solar Saros 139 ===
- Preceded by: Solar eclipse of April 8, 2024
- Followed by: Solar eclipse of April 30, 2060

=== Inex ===
- Preceded by: Solar eclipse of May 10, 2013
- Followed by: Solar eclipse of March 31, 2071

=== Triad ===
- Preceded by: Solar eclipse of June 20, 1955
- Followed by: Solar eclipse of February 18, 2129

=== Solar eclipses of 2040–2043 ===
This eclipse is a member of a semester series. An eclipse in a semester series of solar eclipses repeats approximately every 177 days and 4 hours (a semester) at alternating nodes of the Moon's orbit.

Solar eclipse series sets from 2040 to 2043
Ascending node			Descending node		
Saros	Map	Gamma	Saros	Map	Gamma
119	May 11, 2040 Partial	−1.2529	124	November 4, 2040 Partial	1.0993
129	April 30, 2041 Total	−0.4492	134	October 25, 2041 Annular	0.4133
139	April 20, 2042 Total	0.2956	144	October 14, 2042 Annular	−0.303
149	April 9, 2043 Total (non-central)	1.0031	154	October 3, 2043 Annular (non-central)	1.0102

=== Saros 139 ===
This eclipse is a part of Saros series 139, repeating every 18 years, 11 days, and containing 71 events. The series started with a partial solar eclipse on May 17, 1501. It contains hybrid eclipses from August 11, 1627 through December 9, 1825 and total eclipses from December 21, 1843 through March 26, 2601. There are no annular eclipses in this set. The series ends at member 71 as a partial eclipse on July 3, 2763. Its eclipses are tabulated in three columns; every third eclipse in the same column is one exeligmos apart, so they all cast shadows over approximately the same parts of the Earth.

The longest duration of totality will be produced by member 61 at 7 minutes, 29.22 seconds on July 16, 2186. This date is the longest solar eclipse computed between 4000 BC and AD 6000. All eclipses in this series occur at the Moon’s ascending node of orbit.

Series members 18–39 occur between 1801 and 2200:
18	19	20
November 29, 1807	December 9, 1825	December 21, 1843
21	22	23
December 31, 1861	January 11, 1880	January 22, 1898
24	25	26
February 3, 1916	February 14, 1934	February 25, 1952
27	28	29
March 7, 1970	March 18, 1988	March 29, 2006
30	31	32
April 8, 2024	April 20, 2042	April 30, 2060
33	34	35
May 11, 2078	May 22, 2096	June 3, 2114
36	37	38
June 13, 2132	June 25, 2150	July 5, 2168
39
July 16, 2186

=== Metonic series ===
The metonic series repeats eclipses every 19 years (6939.69 days), lasting about 5 cycles. Eclipses occur in nearly the same calendar date. In addition, the octon subseries repeats 1/5 of that or every 3.8 years (1387.94 days). All eclipses in this table occur at the Moon's ascending node.

21 eclipse events between July 1, 2000 and July 1, 2076
July 1–2	April 19–20	February 5–7	November 24–25	September 12–13
117	119	121	123	125
July 1, 2000	April 19, 2004	February 7, 2008	November 25, 2011	September 13, 2015
127	129	131	133	135
July 2, 2019	April 20, 2023	February 6, 2027	November 25, 2030	September 12, 2034
137	139	141	143	145
July 2, 2038	April 20, 2042	February 5, 2046	November 25, 2049	September 12, 2053
147	149	151	153	155
July 1, 2057	April 20, 2061	February 5, 2065	November 24, 2068	September 12, 2072
157
July 1, 2076

=== Tritos series ===
This eclipse is a part of a tritos cycle, repeating at alternating nodes every 135 synodic months (≈ 3986.63 days, or 11 years minus 1 month). Their appearance and longitude are irregular due to a lack of synchronization with the anomalistic month (period of perigee), but groupings of 3 tritos cycles (≈ 33 years minus 3 months) come close (≈ 434.044 anomalistic months), so eclipses are similar in these groupings.

Series members between 1801 and 2200
March 4, 1802 (Saros 117)	February 1, 1813 (Saros 118)	January 1, 1824 (Saros 119)	November 30, 1834 (Saros 120)	October 30, 1845 (Saros 121)
September 29, 1856 (Saros 122)	August 29, 1867 (Saros 123)	July 29, 1878 (Saros 124)	June 28, 1889 (Saros 125)	May 28, 1900 (Saros 126)
April 28, 1911 (Saros 127)	March 28, 1922 (Saros 128)	February 24, 1933 (Saros 129)	January 25, 1944 (Saros 130)	December 25, 1954 (Saros 131)
November 23, 1965 (Saros 132)	October 23, 1976 (Saros 133)	September 23, 1987 (Saros 134)	August 22, 1998 (Saros 135)	July 22, 2009 (Saros 136)
June 21, 2020 (Saros 137)	May 21, 2031 (Saros 138)	April 20, 2042 (Saros 139)	March 20, 2053 (Saros 140)	February 17, 2064 (Saros 141)
January 16, 2075 (Saros 142)	December 16, 2085 (Saros 143)	November 15, 2096 (Saros 144)	October 16, 2107 (Saros 145)	September 15, 2118 (Saros 146)
August 15, 2129 (Saros 147)	July 14, 2140 (Saros 148)	June 14, 2151 (Saros 149)	May 14, 2162 (Saros 150)	April 12, 2173 (Saros 151)
March 12, 2184 (Saros 152)	February 10, 2195 (Saros 153)			

=== Inex series ===
This eclipse is a part of the long period inex cycle, repeating at alternating nodes, every 358 synodic months (≈ 10,571.95 days, or 29 years minus 20 days). Their appearance and longitude are irregular due to a lack of synchronization with the anomalistic month (period of perigee). However, groupings of 3 inex cycles (≈ 87 years minus 2 months) comes close (≈ 1,151.02 anomalistic months), so eclipses are similar in these groupings.

Series members between 1801 and 2200
September 28, 1810 (Saros 131)	September 7, 1839 (Saros 132)	August 18, 1868 (Saros 133)
July 29, 1897 (Saros 134)	July 9, 1926 (Saros 135)	June 20, 1955 (Saros 136)
May 30, 1984 (Saros 137)	May 10, 2013 (Saros 138)	April 20, 2042 (Saros 139)
March 31, 2071 (Saros 140)	March 10, 2100 (Saros 141)	February 18, 2129 (Saros 142)
January 30, 2158 (Saros 143)	January 9, 2187 (Saros 144)	

== In popular culture ==
A fictionalized version of the solar eclipse of April 20, 2042 is heavily featured in the 2005 novel Sunstorm by Arthur C. Clarke and Stephen Baxter.
