= Solar eclipse of October 24, 2060 =

Future annular solar eclipse

- Annular eclipse
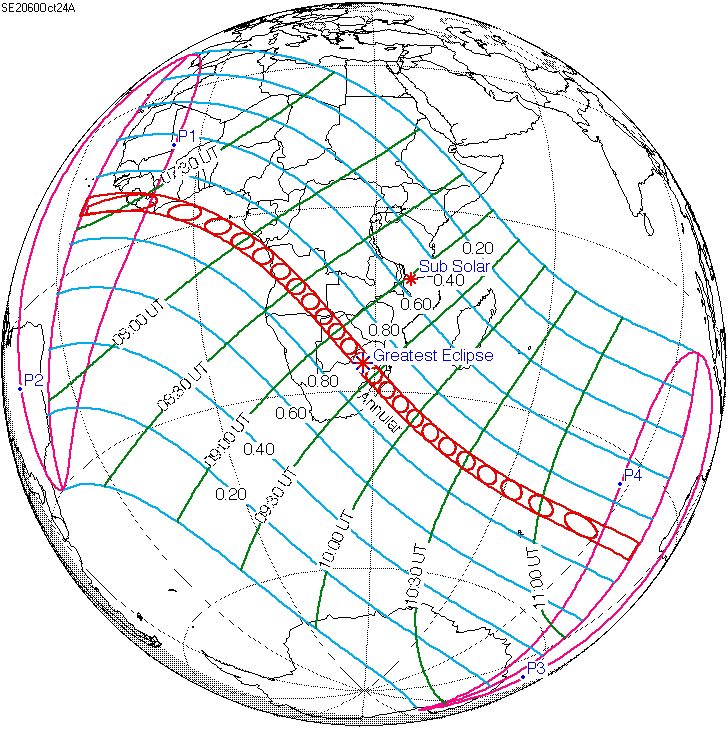
- Map
- Gamma: −0.2625
- Magnitude: 0.9277

Maximum eclipse
- Duration: 486 s (8 min 6 s)
- Coordinates: 25.8°S 28.1°E
- Max. width of band: 281 km (175 mi)

Times (UTC)
- Greatest eclipse: 9:24:10

References
- Saros: 144 (19 of 70)
- Catalog # (SE5000): 9643

An annular solar eclipse will occur at the Moon's descending node of orbit on Sunday, October 24, 2060, with a magnitude of 0.9277. A solar eclipse occurs when the Moon passes between Earth and the Sun, thereby totally or partly obscuring the image of the Sun for a viewer on Earth. An annular solar eclipse occurs when the Moon's apparent diameter is smaller than the Sun's, blocking most of the Sun's light and causing the Sun to look like an annulus (ring). An annular eclipse appears as a partial eclipse over a region of the Earth thousands of kilometres wide. Occurring about 18 hours before apogee (on October 25, 2060, at 1:20 UTC), the Moon's apparent diameter will be smaller.

The path of annularity will be visible from parts of southern Guinea, Sierra Leone, Liberia, Côte d'Ivoire, the Annobón Natural Reserve, Angola, northeastern Namibia, Botswana, and South Africa. A partial solar eclipse will also be visible for parts of eastern Brazil, Africa, and Antarctica.

== Eclipse details ==
Shown below are two tables displaying details about this particular solar eclipse. The first table outlines times at which the Moon's penumbra or umbra attains the specific parameter, and the second table describes various other parameters pertaining to this eclipse.

October 24, 2060 Solar Eclipse Times
Event	Time (UTC)
First Penumbral External Contact	2060 October 24 at 06:19:40.5 UTC
First Umbral External Contact	2060 October 24 at 07:26:08.2 UTC
First Central Line	2060 October 24 at 07:29:18.5 UTC
First Umbral Internal Contact	2060 October 24 at 07:32:29.2 UTC
First Penumbral Internal Contact	2060 October 24 at 08:43:57.6 UTC
Greatest Eclipse	2060 October 24 at 09:24:10.4 UTC
Ecliptic Conjunction	2060 October 24 at 09:27:20.1 UTC
Equatorial Conjunction	2060 October 24 at 09:39:25.2 UTC
Greatest Duration	2060 October 24 at 09:41:30.5 UTC
Last Penumbral Internal Contact	2060 October 24 at 10:04:00.7 UTC
Last Umbral Internal Contact	2060 October 24 at 11:15:41.4 UTC
Last Central Line	2060 October 24 at 11:18:52.9 UTC
Last Umbral External Contact	2060 October 24 at 11:22:03.9 UTC
Last Penumbral External Contact	2060 October 24 at 12:28:35.3 UTC

October 24, 2060 Solar Eclipse Parameters
Parameter	Value
Eclipse Magnitude	0.92766
Eclipse Obscuration	0.86055
Gamma	−0.26249
Sun Right Ascension	13h58m17.5s
Sun Declination	-12°04'28.2"
Sun Semi-Diameter	16'04.8"
Sun Equatorial Horizontal Parallax	08.8"
Moon Right Ascension	13h57m52.2s
Moon Declination	-12°17'09.7"
Moon Semi-Diameter	14'42.1"
Moon Equatorial Horizontal Parallax	0°53'57.3"
ΔT	91.0 s

== Eclipse season ==
This eclipse is part of an eclipse season, a period, roughly every six months, when eclipses occur. Only two (or occasionally three) eclipse seasons occur each year, and each season lasts about 35 days and repeats just short of six months (173 days) later; thus two full eclipse seasons always occur each year. Either two or three eclipses happen each eclipse season. In the sequence below, each eclipse is separated by a fortnight. The first and last eclipse in this sequence is separated by one synodic month.

Eclipse season of October–November 2060
October 9 Ascending node (full moon)	October 24 Descending node (new moon)	November 8 Ascending node (full moon)
Penumbral lunar eclipse Lunar Saros 118	Annular solar eclipse Solar Saros 144	Penumbral lunar eclipse Lunar Saros 156

== Related eclipses ==
=== Eclipses in 2060 ===
- A penumbral lunar eclipse on April 15.
- A total solar eclipse on April 30.
- A penumbral lunar eclipse on October 9.
- An annular solar eclipse on October 24.
- A penumbral lunar eclipse on November 8.

=== Metonic ===
- Preceded by: Solar eclipse of January 5, 2057
- Followed by: Solar eclipse of August 12, 2064

=== Tzolkinex ===
- Preceded by: Solar eclipse of September 12, 2053
- Followed by: Solar eclipse of December 6, 2067

=== Half-Saros ===
- Preceded by: Lunar eclipse of October 19, 2051
- Followed by: Lunar eclipse of October 30, 2069

=== Tritos ===
- Preceded by: Solar eclipse of November 25, 2049
- Followed by: Solar eclipse of September 23, 2071

=== Solar Saros 144 ===
- Preceded by: Solar eclipse of October 14, 2042
- Followed by: Solar eclipse of November 4, 2078

=== Inex ===
- Preceded by: Solar eclipse of November 14, 2031
- Followed by: Solar eclipse of October 4, 2089

=== Triad ===
- Preceded by: Solar eclipse of December 24, 1973
- Followed by: Solar eclipse of August 26, 2147

=== Solar eclipses of 2058–2061 ===
This eclipse is a member of a semester series. An eclipse in a semester series of solar eclipses repeats approximately every 177 days and 4 hours (a semester) at alternating nodes of the Moon's orbit.

The partial solar eclipse on June 21, 2058 occurs in the previous lunar year eclipse set.

Solar eclipse series sets from 2058 to 2061
Ascending node			Descending node		
Saros	Map	Gamma	Saros	Map	Gamma
119	May 22, 2058 Partial	−1.3194	124	November 16, 2058 Partial	1.1224
129	May 11, 2059 Total	−0.508	134	November 5, 2059 Annular	0.4454
139	April 30, 2060 Total	0.2422	144	October 24, 2060 Annular	−0.2625
149	April 20, 2061 Total	0.9578	154	October 13, 2061 Annular	−0.9639

=== Saros 144 ===
This eclipse is a part of Saros series 144, repeating every 18 years, 11 days, and containing 70 events. The series started with a partial solar eclipse on April 11, 1736. It contains annular eclipses from July 7, 1880 through August 27, 2565. There are no hybrid or total eclipses in this set. The series ends at member 70 as a partial eclipse on May 5, 2980. Its eclipses are tabulated in three columns; every third eclipse in the same column is one exeligmos apart, so they all cast shadows over approximately the same parts of the Earth.

The longest duration of annularity will be produced by member 51 at 9 minutes, 52 seconds on December 29, 2168. All eclipses in this series occur at the Moon’s descending node of orbit.

Series members 5–26 occur between 1801 and 2200:
5	6	7
May 25, 1808	June 5, 1826	June 16, 1844
8	9	10
June 27, 1862	July 7, 1880	July 18, 1898
11	12	13
July 30, 1916	August 10, 1934	August 20, 1952
14	15	16
August 31, 1970	September 11, 1988	September 22, 2006
17	18	19
October 2, 2024	October 14, 2042	October 24, 2060
20	21	22
November 4, 2078	November 15, 2096	November 27, 2114
23	24	25
December 7, 2132	December 19, 2150	December 29, 2168
26
January 9, 2187

=== Metonic series ===
The metonic series repeats eclipses every 19 years (6939.69 days), lasting about 5 cycles. Eclipses occur in nearly the same calendar date. In addition, the octon subseries repeats 1/5 of that or every 3.8 years (1387.94 days). All eclipses in this table occur at the Moon's descending node.

22 eclipse events between June 1, 2011 and October 24, 2098
May 31–June 1	March 19–20	January 5–6	October 24–25	August 12–13
118	120	122	124	126
June 1, 2011	March 20, 2015	January 6, 2019	October 25, 2022	August 12, 2026
128	130	132	134	136
June 1, 2030	March 20, 2034	January 5, 2038	October 25, 2041	August 12, 2045
138	140	142	144	146
May 31, 2049	March 20, 2053	January 5, 2057	October 24, 2060	August 12, 2064
148	150	152	154	156
May 31, 2068	March 19, 2072	January 6, 2076	October 24, 2079	August 13, 2083
158	160	162	164	
June 1, 2087			October 24, 2098	

=== Tritos series ===
This eclipse is a part of a tritos cycle, repeating at alternating nodes every 135 synodic months (≈ 3986.63 days, or 11 years minus 1 month). Their appearance and longitude are irregular due to a lack of synchronization with the anomalistic month (period of perigee), but groupings of 3 tritos cycles (≈ 33 years minus 3 months) come close (≈ 434.044 anomalistic months), so eclipses are similar in these groupings.

Series members between 1801 and 2200
October 9, 1809 (Saros 121)	September 7, 1820 (Saros 122)	August 7, 1831 (Saros 123)	July 8, 1842 (Saros 124)	June 6, 1853 (Saros 125)
May 6, 1864 (Saros 126)	April 6, 1875 (Saros 127)	March 5, 1886 (Saros 128)	February 1, 1897 (Saros 129)	January 3, 1908 (Saros 130)
December 3, 1918 (Saros 131)	November 1, 1929 (Saros 132)	October 1, 1940 (Saros 133)	September 1, 1951 (Saros 134)	July 31, 1962 (Saros 135)
June 30, 1973 (Saros 136)	May 30, 1984 (Saros 137)	April 29, 1995 (Saros 138)	March 29, 2006 (Saros 139)	February 26, 2017 (Saros 140)
January 26, 2028 (Saros 141)	December 26, 2038 (Saros 142)	November 25, 2049 (Saros 143)	October 24, 2060 (Saros 144)	September 23, 2071 (Saros 145)
August 24, 2082 (Saros 146)	July 23, 2093 (Saros 147)	June 22, 2104 (Saros 148)	May 24, 2115 (Saros 149)	April 22, 2126 (Saros 150)
March 21, 2137 (Saros 151)	February 19, 2148 (Saros 152)	January 19, 2159 (Saros 153)	December 18, 2169 (Saros 154)	November 17, 2180 (Saros 155)
October 18, 2191 (Saros 156)

=== Inex series ===
This eclipse is a part of the long period inex cycle, repeating at alternating nodes, every 358 synodic months (≈ 10,571.95 days, or 29 years minus 20 days). Their appearance and longitude are irregular due to a lack of synchronization with the anomalistic month (period of perigee). However, groupings of 3 inex cycles (≈ 87 years minus 2 months) comes close (≈ 1,151.02 anomalistic months), so eclipses are similar in these groupings.

Series members between 1801 and 2200
April 3, 1829 (Saros 136)	March 15, 1858 (Saros 137)	February 22, 1887 (Saros 138)
February 3, 1916 (Saros 139)	January 14, 1945 (Saros 140)	December 24, 1973 (Saros 141)
December 4, 2002 (Saros 142)	November 14, 2031 (Saros 143)	October 24, 2060 (Saros 144)
October 4, 2089 (Saros 145)	September 15, 2118 (Saros 146)	August 26, 2147 (Saros 147)
August 4, 2176 (Saros 148)		
