= November 2041 lunar eclipse =

Astronomical event

- Partial eclipse
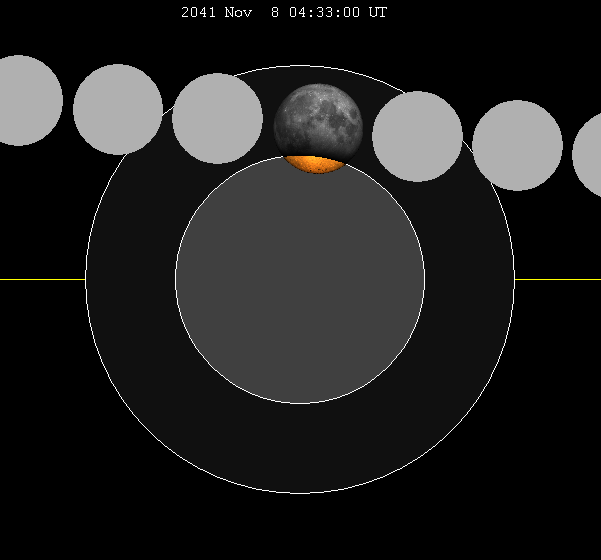
- The Moon's hourly motion shown right to left
- Date: November 8, 2041
- Gamma: 0.9212
- Magnitude: 0.1714
- Saros cycle: 146 (12 of 72)
- Partiality: 90 minutes, 21 seconds
- Penumbral: 268 minutes, 0 seconds
Contacts (UTC)
- P1: 2:19:38
- U1: 3:48:23
- Greatest: 4:33:39
- U4: 5:18:44
- P4: 6:47:39

A partial lunar eclipse will occur at the Moon’s ascending node of orbit on Friday, November 8, 2041, with an umbral magnitude of 0.1714. A lunar eclipse occurs when the Moon moves into the Earth's shadow, causing the Moon to be darkened. A partial lunar eclipse occurs when one part of the Moon is in the Earth's umbra, while the other part is in the Earth's penumbra. Unlike a solar eclipse, which can only be viewed from a relatively small area of the world, a lunar eclipse may be viewed from anywhere on the night side of Earth. Occurring about 2.7 days after perigee (on November 5, 2041, at 10:50 UTC), the Moon's apparent diameter will be larger.

== Visibility ==
The eclipse will be completely visible over North and South America, western Europe, and west Africa, seen rising over the central Pacific Ocean and setting over much of Africa, eastern Europe, the Middle East, and central Asia.

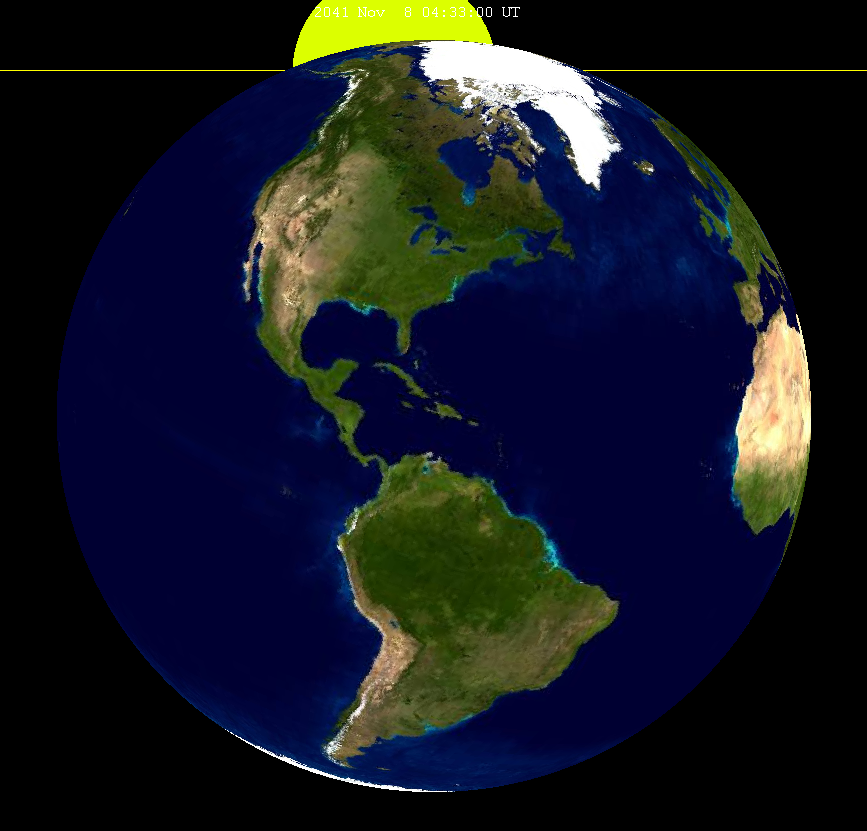
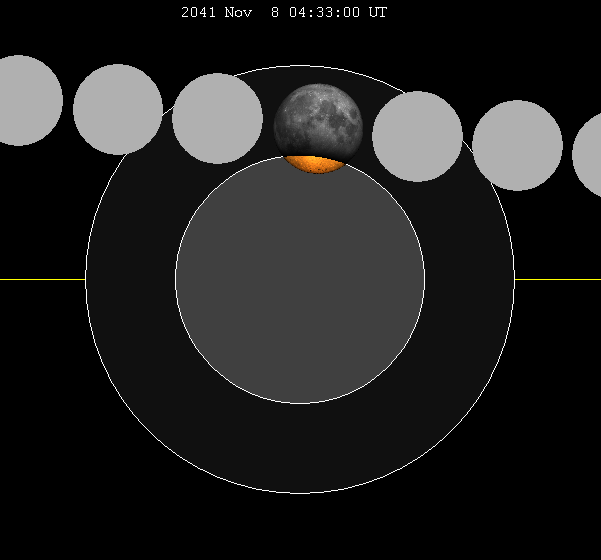

== Eclipse details ==
Shown below is a table displaying details about this particular eclipse. It describes various parameters pertaining to this eclipse.

November 8, 2041 Lunar Eclipse Parameters
| Parameter | Value |
|---|---|
| Penumbral Magnitude | 1.16747 |
| Umbral Magnitude | 0.17144 |
| Gamma | 0.92123 |
| Sun Right Ascension | 14h54m42.6s |
| Sun Declination | -16°39'56.0" |
| Sun Semi-Diameter | 16'08.5" |
| Sun Equatorial Horizontal Parallax | 08.9" |
| Moon Right Ascension | 02h53m15.3s |
| Moon Declination | +17°30'36.2" |
| Moon Semi-Diameter | 16'12.4" |
| Moon Equatorial Horizontal Parallax | 0°59'28.8" |
| ΔT | 80.2 s |

== Eclipse season ==
This eclipse is part of an eclipse season, a period, roughly every six months, when eclipses occur. Only two (or occasionally three) eclipse seasons occur each year, and each season lasts about 35 days and repeats just short of six months (173 days) later; thus two full eclipse seasons always occur each year. Either two or three eclipses happen each eclipse season. In the sequence below, each eclipse is separated by a fortnight.

Eclipse season of October–November 2041
| October 25 Descending node (new moon) | November 8 Ascending node (full moon) |
|---|---|
| Annular solar eclipse Solar Saros 134 | Partial lunar eclipse Lunar Saros 146 |

== Related eclipses ==
=== Eclipses in 2041 ===
- A total solar eclipse on April 30.
- A partial lunar eclipse on May 16.
- An annular solar eclipse on October 25.
- A partial lunar eclipse on November 8.

=== Metonic ===
- Preceded by: Lunar eclipse of January 21, 2038
- Followed by: Lunar eclipse of August 27, 2045

=== Tzolkinex ===
- Preceded by: Lunar eclipse of September 28, 2034
- Followed by: Lunar eclipse of December 20, 2048

=== Half-Saros ===
- Preceded by: Solar eclipse of November 3, 2032
- Followed by: Solar eclipse of November 14, 2050

=== Tritos ===
- Preceded by: Lunar eclipse of December 9, 2030
- Followed by: Lunar eclipse of October 8, 2052

=== Lunar Saros 146 ===
- Preceded by: Lunar eclipse of October 28, 2023
- Followed by: Lunar eclipse of November 19, 2059

=== Inex ===
- Preceded by: Lunar eclipse of November 28, 2012
- Followed by: Lunar eclipse of October 19, 2070

=== Triad ===
- Preceded by: Lunar eclipse of January 8, 1955
- Followed by: Lunar eclipse of September 9, 2128

=== Lunar eclipses of 2038–2042 ===
This eclipse is a member of a semester series. An eclipse in a semester series of lunar eclipses repeats approximately every 177 days and 4 hours (a semester) at alternating nodes of the Moon's orbit.

The penumbral lunar eclipses on January 21, 2038 and July 16, 2038 occur in the previous lunar year eclipse set, and the penumbral lunar eclipses on April 5, 2042 and September 29, 2042 occur in the next lunar year eclipse set.

Lunar eclipse series sets from 2038 to 2042
| Descending node | | | | Ascending node | | | |
| Saros | Date Viewing | Type Chart | Gamma | Saros | Date Viewing | Type Chart | Gamma |
| 111 | 2038 Jun 17 | Penumbral | 1.3082 | 116 | 2038 Dec 11 | Penumbral | −1.1448 |
| 121 | 2039 Jun 06 | Partial | 0.5460 | 126 | 2039 Nov 30 | Partial | −0.4721 |
| 131 | 2040 May 26 | Total | −0.1872 | 136 | 2040 Nov 18 | Total | 0.2361 |
| 141 | 2041 May 16 | Partial | −0.9746 | 146 | 2041 Nov 08 | Partial | 0.9212 |
| | | | | 156 | 2042 Oct 28 | Penumbral | − |

=== Metonic series ===
The Metonic cycle repeats nearly exactly every 19 years and represents a Saros cycle plus one lunar year. Because it occurs on the same calendar date, the Earth's shadow will be in nearly the same location relative to the background stars.

| 1. 1984 May 15.19 - penumbral (111); 2. 2003 May 16.15 - total (121); 3. 2022 May 16.17 - total (131); 4. 2041 May 16.03 - penumbral (141) | 1. 1984 Nov 08.75 - penumbral (116); 2. 2003 Nov 09.05 - total (126); 3. 2022 Nov 08.46 - total (136); 4. 2041 Nov 08.19 - partial (146); 5. 2060 Nov 08.17 - penumbral (156) |

=== Saros 146 ===
This eclipse is a part of Saros series 146, repeating every 18 years, 11 days, and containing 72 events. The series started with a penumbral lunar eclipse on July 11, 1843. It contains partial eclipses from October 17, 2005 through May 14, 2348; total eclipses from May 25, 2366 through November 16, 2654; and a second set of partial eclipses from November 27, 2672 through June 12, 2997. The series ends at member 72 as a penumbral eclipse on August 29, 3123.

The longest duration of totality will be produced by member 37 at 99 minutes, 22 seconds on August 8, 2492. All eclipses in this series occur at the Moon’s ascending node of orbit.

| Greatest | First | | | |
|---|---|---|---|---|
| The greatest eclipse of the series will occur on 2492 Aug 08, lasting 99 minutes, 22 seconds. | Penumbral | Partial | Total | Central |
| The greatest eclipse of the series will occur on 2492 Aug 08, lasting 99 minutes, 22 seconds. | 1843 Jul 11 | 2005 Oct 17 | 2366 May 25 | 2438 Jul 07 |
| The greatest eclipse of the series will occur on 2492 Aug 08, lasting 99 minutes, 22 seconds. | Last | | | |
| The greatest eclipse of the series will occur on 2492 Aug 08, lasting 99 minutes, 22 seconds. | Central | Total | Partial | Penumbral |
| The greatest eclipse of the series will occur on 2492 Aug 08, lasting 99 minutes, 22 seconds. | 2546 Sep 11 | 2654 Nov 16 | 2997 Jun 12 | 3123 Aug 29 |

Eclipses are tabulated in three columns; every third eclipse in the same column is one exeligmos apart, so they all cast shadows over approximately the same parts of the Earth.

Series members 1–20 occur between 1843 and 2200:
| 1 | 2 | 3 |
|---|---|---|
| 1843 Jul 11 | 1861 Jul 21 | 1879 Aug 02 |
| 4 | 5 | 6 |
| 1897 Aug 12 | 1915 Aug 24 | 1933 Sep 04 |
| 7 | 8 | 9 |
| 1951 Sep 15 | 1969 Sep 25 | 1987 Oct 07 |
| 10 | 11 | 12 |
| 2005 Oct 17 | 2023 Oct 28 | 2041 Nov 08 |
| 13 | 14 | 15 |
| 2059 Nov 19 | 2077 Nov 29 | 2095 Dec 11 |
| 16 | 17 | 18 |
| 2113 Dec 22 | 2132 Jan 02 | 2150 Jan 13 |
| 19 | 20 | |
| 2168 Jan 24 | 2186 Feb 04 | |

=== Tritos series ===
This eclipse is a part of a tritos cycle, repeating at alternating nodes every 135 synodic months (≈ 3986.63 days, or 11 years minus 1 month). Their appearance and longitude are irregular due to a lack of synchronization with the anomalistic month (period of perigee), but groupings of 3 tritos cycles (≈ 33 years minus 3 months) come close (≈ 434.044 anomalistic months), so eclipses are similar in these groupings.

Series members between 1801 and 2183
| 1801 Sep 22 (Saros 124) | 1812 Aug 22 (Saros 125) | 1823 Jul 23 (Saros 126) | 1834 Jun 21 (Saros 127) | 1845 May 21 (Saros 128) |
| 1856 Apr 20 (Saros 129) | 1867 Mar 20 (Saros 130) | 1878 Feb 17 (Saros 131) | 1889 Jan 17 (Saros 132) | 1899 Dec 17 (Saros 133) |
| 1910 Nov 17 (Saros 134) | 1921 Oct 16 (Saros 135) | 1932 Sep 14 (Saros 136) | 1943 Aug 15 (Saros 137) | 1954 Jul 16 (Saros 138) |
| 1965 Jun 14 (Saros 139) | 1976 May 13 (Saros 140) | 1987 Apr 14 (Saros 141) | 1998 Mar 13 (Saros 142) | 2009 Feb 09 (Saros 143) |
| 2020 Jan 10 (Saros 144) | 2030 Dec 09 (Saros 145) | 2041 Nov 08 (Saros 146) | 2052 Oct 08 (Saros 147) | 2063 Sep 07 (Saros 148) |
| 2074 Aug 07 (Saros 149) | 2085 Jul 07 (Saros 150) | 2096 Jun 06 (Saros 151) | 2107 May 07 (Saros 152) | |
| | | 2151 Jan 02 (Saros 156) | | 2172 Oct 31 (Saros 158) |
2183 Oct 01 (Saros 159)

=== Inex series ===
This eclipse is a part of the long period inex cycle, repeating at alternating nodes, every 358 synodic months (≈ 10,571.95 days, or 29 years minus 20 days). Their appearance and longitude are irregular due to a lack of synchronization with the anomalistic month (period of perigee). However, groupings of 3 inex cycles (≈ 87 years minus 2 months) comes close (≈ 1,151.02 anomalistic months), so eclipses are similar in these groupings.

Series members between 1801 and 2200
| 1810 Apr 19 (Saros 138) | 1839 Mar 30 (Saros 139) | 1868 Mar 08 (Saros 140) |
| 1897 Feb 17 (Saros 141) | 1926 Jan 28 (Saros 142) | 1955 Jan 08 (Saros 143) |
| 1983 Dec 20 (Saros 144) | 2012 Nov 28 (Saros 145) | 2041 Nov 08 (Saros 146) |
| 2070 Oct 19 (Saros 147) | 2099 Sep 29 (Saros 148) | 2128 Sep 09 (Saros 149) |
| 2157 Aug 20 (Saros 150) | 2186 Jul 31 (Saros 151) | |

=== Half-Saros cycle ===
A lunar eclipse will be preceded and followed by solar eclipses by 9 years and 5.5 days (a half saros). This lunar eclipse is related to two annular solar eclipses of Solar Saros 153.

| November 3, 2032 | November 14, 2050 |

== See also ==
- List of lunar eclipses and List of 21st-century lunar eclipses
