= Solar eclipse of October 25, 2041 =

Future annular solar eclipse

- Annular eclipse
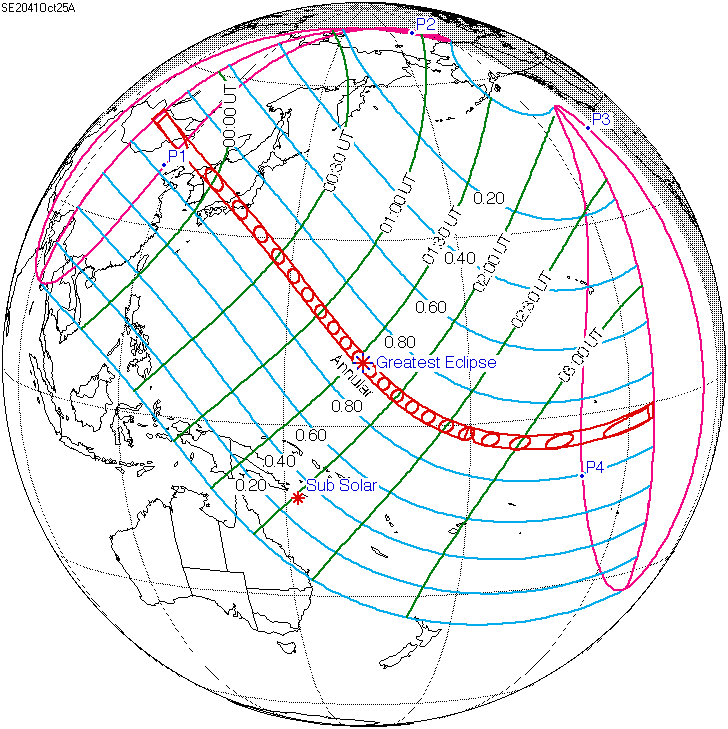
- Map
- Gamma: 0.4133
- Magnitude: 0.9467

Maximum eclipse
- Duration: 367 s (6 min 7 s)
- Coordinates: 9.9°N 162.9°E
- Max. width of band: 213 km (132 mi)

Times (UTC)
- Greatest eclipse: 1:36:22

References
- Saros: 134 (45 of 71)
- Catalog # (SE5000): 9600

An annular solar eclipse will occur at the Moon's descending node of orbit between Thursday, October 24 and Friday, October 25, 2041, with a magnitude of 0.9467. A solar eclipse occurs when the Moon passes between Earth and the Sun, thereby totally or partly obscuring the image of the Sun for a viewer on Earth. An annular solar eclipse occurs when the Moon's apparent diameter is smaller than the Sun's, blocking most of the Sun's light and causing the Sun to look like an annulus (ring). An annular eclipse appears as a partial eclipse over a region of the Earth thousands of kilometres wide. Occurring about 4.3 days after apogee (on October 20, 2041, at 17:10 UTC), the Moon's apparent diameter will be smaller.

The path of annularity will be visible from parts of Mongolia, northeastern China, North Korea, Japan, the Marshall Islands, and Kiribati. A partial solar eclipse will be visible for parts of East Asia, Southeast Asia, northeastern Australia, Oceania, and Hawaii.

== Images ==
Animated path

== Eclipse timing ==
=== Places experiencing annular eclipse ===
Solar Eclipse of October 25, 2041 (Local Times)
Country or territory	City or place	Start of partial eclipse	Start of annular eclipse	Maximum eclipse	End of annular eclipse	End of partial eclipse	Duration of annularity (min:s)	Duration of eclipse (hr:min)	Maximum coverage
Mongolia	Ulaanbaatar	07:26:19 (sunrise)	07:47:17	07:49:40	07:52:03	09:02:56	4:46	1:37	87.24%
Mongolia	Erdenet	07:39:55 (sunrise)	07:47:26	07:49:47	07:52:08	09:01:46	4:42	1:22	87.13%
Mongolia	Darkhan	07:33:16 (sunrise)	07:49:22	07:50:26	07:51:29	09:03:03	2:07	1:30	87.18%
China	Shenyang	06:40:45	07:52:44	07:54:45	07:56:46	09:16:58	4:02	2:36	87.91%
China	Benxi	06:40:42	07:53:50	07:54:55	07:56:01	09:17:28	2:11	2:37	87.94%
China	Fushun	06:40:53	07:52:44	07:55:06	07:57:28	09:17:34	4:44	2:37	87.93%
North Korea	Hamhung	07:41:30	08:55:42	08:57:45	08:59:47	10:22:45	4:05	2:41	88.10%
Japan	Kyoto	07:45:20	09:05:27	09:07:04	09:08:40	10:38:39	3:13	2:53	88.53%
Japan	Kanazawa	07:45:36	09:05:49	09:07:19	09:08:48	10:38:35	2:59	2:53	88.51%
Japan	Suzuka	07:45:50	09:05:44	09:08:05	09:10:24	10:40:11	4:40	2:54	88.56%
Japan	Tsu	07:45:50	09:06:02	09:08:04	09:10:06	10:40:13	4:04	2:54	88.57%
Japan	Nagoya	07:45:57	09:05:37	09:08:17	09:10:56	10:40:25	5:19	2:54	88.56%
Japan	Hamamatsu	07:46:34	09:06:50	09:09:30	09:12:12	10:42:20	5:22	2:56	88.61%
Japan	Shizuoka	07:46:56	09:07:49	09:10:07	09:12:26	10:43:08	4:37	2:56	88.62%
Kiribati	Tarawa	12:28:45	14:17:16	14:20:17	14:23:17	16:00:41	6:01	3:32	89.55%
Kiribati	Canton Island	14:19:04	15:57:43	15:59:22	16:01:01	17:23:04	3:18	3:04	88.77%
Kiribati	Rawaki	14:23:04	15:59:14	16:01:57	16:04:41	17:24:29	5:27	3:01	88.72%

=== Places experiencing partial eclipse ===
Solar Eclipse of October 25, 2041 (Local Times)
Country or territory	City or place	Start of partial eclipse	Maximum eclipse	End of partial eclipse	Duration of eclipse (hr:min)	Maximum coverage
China	Beijing	06:39:50	07:50:19	09:08:41	2:33	76.14%
Mongolia	Bayankhongor	07:48:01 (sunrise)	07:51:16	08:58:19	1:10	80.08%
Mongolia	Choibalsan	06:56:09 (sunrise)	07:52:06	09:08:21	2:12	85.67%
Russia	Irkutsk	07:45:51 (sunrise)	07:52:07	09:03:29	1:18	81.40%
North Korea	Pyongyang	07:40:57	08:56:24	10:20:40	2:40	85.41%
South Korea	Seoul	07:41:21	08:57:35	10:22:55	2:42	83.07%
Taiwan	Taipei	06:51:15	07:58:35	09:14:19	2:23	37.85%
Japan	Tokyo	07:47:44	09:11:19	10:44:29	2:57	86.90%
Northern Mariana Islands	Saipan	09:14:21	10:47:00	12:29:26	3:15	61.63%
Guam	Hagåtña	09:17:30	10:48:34	12:29:14	3:12	55.03%
United States Minor Outlying Islands	Wake Island	11:39:20	13:23:36	15:08:44	3:29	64.82%
Federated States of Micronesia	Palikir	10:45:38	12:31:24	14:20:00	3:34	75.63%
Marshall Islands	Majuro	12:12:03	14:03:44	15:47:30	3:35	82.01%
Nauru	Yaren	12:19:55	14:09:43	15:52:53	3:33	77.98%
Solomon Islands	Honiara	11:37:39	13:13:06	14:45:08	3:07	40.44%
United States	Honolulu (Note: The times listed for this location occur on October 24, 2041, local time.)	15:30:36	16:42:58	17:45:47	2:15	25.09%
United States Minor Outlying Islands	Baker Island	13:00:33	14:46:24	16:15:45	3:15	84.34%
Tuvalu	Funafuti	13:08:03	14:50:47	16:19:17	3:11	72.55%
Fiji	Suva	13:32:30	15:00:06	16:17:26	2:45	41.17%
United States Minor Outlying Islands	Palmyra Atoll	15:31:57	17:02:02	18:17:15	2:45	62.38%
Wallis and Futuna	Mata Utu	13:29:45	15:03:44	16:24:23	2:55	60.15%
Tokelau	Fakaofo	14:32:01	16:07:07	17:27:18	2:55	75.21%
Samoa	Apia	14:39:49	16:10:02	17:27:06	2:47	60.01%
Tonga	Nuku'alofa	14:51:20	16:10:28	17:20:13	2:29	35.14%
French Polynesia	Taiohae	16:47:17	17:40:40	17:43:21 (sunset)	0:56	55.22%
American Samoa	Pago Pago	14:42:49	16:11:36	17:27:31	2:45	58.75%
Kiribati	Kiritimati	15:45:52	17:11:48	18:15:10 (sunset)	2:29	75.28%
Niue	Alofi	14:54:36	16:15:05	17:25:07	2:31	42.98%
Cook Islands	Rarotonga	16:14:00	17:23:14	18:24:24	2:10	35.20%
French Polynesia	Papeete	16:19:24	17:26:19	18:01:33 (sunset)	1:42	42.87%

== Eclipse details ==
Shown below are two tables displaying details about this particular solar eclipse. The first table outlines times at which the Moon's penumbra or umbra attains the specific parameter, and the second table describes various other parameters pertaining to this eclipse.

October 25, 2041 Solar Eclipse Times
Event	Time (UTC)
First Penumbral External Contact	2041 October 24 at 22:41:02.8 UTC
First Umbral External Contact	2041 October 24 at 23:48:18.5 UTC
First Central Line	2041 October 24 at 23:50:49.8 UTC
First Umbral Internal Contact	2041 October 24 at 23:53:21.7 UTC
Equatorial Conjunction	2041 October 25 at 01:13:01.1 UTC
First Penumbral Internal Contact	2041 October 25 at 01:22:11.2 UTC
Ecliptic Conjunction	2041 October 25 at 01:31:31.7 UTC
Greatest Eclipse	2041 October 25 at 01:36:21.7 UTC
Last Penumbral Internal Contact	2041 October 25 at 01:51:07.0 UTC
Greatest Duration	2041 October 25 at 01:51:55.5 UTC
Last Umbral Internal Contact	2041 October 25 at 03:19:38.3 UTC
Last Central Line	2041 October 25 at 03:22:07.7 UTC
Last Umbral External Contact	2041 October 25 at 03:24:36.3 UTC
Last Penumbral External Contact	2041 October 25 at 04:31:44.8 UTC

October 25, 2041 Solar Eclipse Parameters
Parameter	Value
Eclipse Magnitude	0.94666
Eclipse Obscuration	0.89617
Gamma	0.41332
Sun Right Ascension	13h59m22.0s
Sun Declination	-12°10'20.1"
Sun Semi-Diameter	16'04.9"
Sun Equatorial Horizontal Parallax	08.8"
Moon Right Ascension	14h00m02.5s
Moon Declination	-11°49'54.3"
Moon Semi-Diameter	15'00.8"
Moon Equatorial Horizontal Parallax	0°55'06.0"
ΔT	79.5 s

== Eclipse season ==
This eclipse is part of an eclipse season, a period, roughly every six months, when eclipses occur. Only two (or occasionally three) eclipse seasons occur each year, and each season lasts about 35 days and repeats just short of six months (173 days) later; thus two full eclipse seasons always occur each year. Either two or three eclipses happen each eclipse season. In the sequence below, each eclipse is separated by a fortnight.

Eclipse season of October–November 2041
October 25 Descending node (new moon)	November 8 Ascending node (full moon)
Annular solar eclipse Solar Saros 134	Partial lunar eclipse Lunar Saros 146

== Related eclipses ==
=== Eclipses in 2041 ===
- A total solar eclipse on April 30.
- A partial lunar eclipse on May 16.
- An annular solar eclipse on October 25.
- A partial lunar eclipse on November 8.

=== Metonic ===
- Preceded by: Solar eclipse of January 5, 2038
- Followed by: Solar eclipse of August 12, 2045

=== Tzolkinex ===
- Preceded by: Solar eclipse of September 12, 2034
- Followed by: Solar eclipse of December 5, 2048

=== Half-Saros ===
- Preceded by: Lunar eclipse of October 18, 2032
- Followed by: Lunar eclipse of October 30, 2050

=== Tritos ===
- Preceded by: Solar eclipse of November 25, 2030
- Followed by: Solar eclipse of September 22, 2052

=== Solar Saros 134 ===
- Preceded by: Solar eclipse of October 14, 2023
- Followed by: Solar eclipse of November 5, 2059

=== Inex ===
- Preceded by: Solar eclipse of November 13, 2012
- Followed by: Solar eclipse of October 4, 2070

=== Triad ===
- Preceded by: Solar eclipse of December 25, 1954
- Followed by: Solar eclipse of August 25, 2128

=== Solar eclipses of 2040–2043 ===
This eclipse is a member of a semester series. An eclipse in a semester series of solar eclipses repeats approximately every 177 days and 4 hours (a semester) at alternating nodes of the Moon's orbit.

Solar eclipse series sets from 2040 to 2043
Ascending node			Descending node		
Saros	Map	Gamma	Saros	Map	Gamma
119	May 11, 2040 Partial	−1.2529	124	November 4, 2040 Partial	1.0993
129	April 30, 2041 Total	−0.4492	134	October 25, 2041 Annular	0.4133
139	April 20, 2042 Total	0.2956	144	October 14, 2042 Annular	−0.303
149	April 9, 2043 Total (non-central)	1.0031	154	October 3, 2043 Annular (non-central)	1.0102

=== Saros 134 ===
This eclipse is a part of Saros series 134, repeating every 18 years, 11 days, and containing 71 events. The series started with a partial solar eclipse on June 22, 1248. It contains total eclipses from October 9, 1428 through December 24, 1554; hybrid eclipses from January 3, 1573 through June 27, 1843; and annular eclipses from July 8, 1861 through May 21, 2384. The series ends at member 72 as a partial eclipse on August 6, 2510. Its eclipses are tabulated in three columns; every third eclipse in the same column is one exeligmos apart, so they all cast shadows over approximately the same parts of the Earth.

The longest duration of totality was produced by member 11 at 1 minutes, 30 seconds on October 9, 1428, and the longest duration of annularity will be produced by member 52 at 10 minutes, 55 seconds on January 10, 2168. All eclipses in this series occur at the Moon’s descending node of orbit.

Series members 32–53 occur between 1801 and 2200:
32	33	34
June 6, 1807	June 16, 1825	June 27, 1843
35	36	37
July 8, 1861	July 19, 1879	July 29, 1897
38	39	40
August 10, 1915	August 21, 1933	September 1, 1951
41	42	43
September 11, 1969	September 23, 1987	October 3, 2005
44	45	46
October 14, 2023	October 25, 2041	November 5, 2059
47	48	49
November 15, 2077	November 27, 2095	December 8, 2113
50	51	52
December 19, 2131	December 30, 2149	January 10, 2168
53
January 20, 2186

=== Metonic series ===
The metonic series repeats eclipses every 19 years (6939.69 days), lasting about 5 cycles. Eclipses occur in nearly the same calendar date. In addition, the octon subseries repeats 1/5 of that or every 3.8 years (1387.94 days). All eclipses in this table occur at the Moon's descending node.

22 eclipse events between June 1, 2011 and October 24, 2098
May 31–June 1	March 19–20	January 5–6	October 24–25	August 12–13
118	120	122	124	126
June 1, 2011	March 20, 2015	January 6, 2019	October 25, 2022	August 12, 2026
128	130	132	134	136
June 1, 2030	March 20, 2034	January 5, 2038	October 25, 2041	August 12, 2045
138	140	142	144	146
May 31, 2049	March 20, 2053	January 5, 2057	October 24, 2060	August 12, 2064
148	150	152	154	156
May 31, 2068	March 19, 2072	January 6, 2076	October 24, 2079	August 13, 2083
158	160	162	164	
June 1, 2087			October 24, 2098	

=== Tritos series ===
This eclipse is a part of a tritos cycle, repeating at alternating nodes every 135 synodic months (≈ 3986.63 days, or 11 years minus 1 month). Their appearance and longitude are irregular due to a lack of synchronization with the anomalistic month (period of perigee), but groupings of 3 tritos cycles (≈ 33 years minus 3 months) come close (≈ 434.044 anomalistic months), so eclipses are similar in these groupings.

Series members between 1801 and 2200
September 8, 1801 (Saros 112)	August 7, 1812 (Saros 113)	July 8, 1823 (Saros 114)	June 7, 1834 (Saros 115)	May 6, 1845 (Saros 116)
April 5, 1856 (Saros 117)	March 6, 1867 (Saros 118)	February 2, 1878 (Saros 119)	January 1, 1889 (Saros 120)	December 3, 1899 (Saros 121)
November 2, 1910 (Saros 122)	October 1, 1921 (Saros 123)	August 31, 1932 (Saros 124)	August 1, 1943 (Saros 125)	June 30, 1954 (Saros 126)
May 30, 1965 (Saros 127)	April 29, 1976 (Saros 128)	March 29, 1987 (Saros 129)	February 26, 1998 (Saros 130)	January 26, 2009 (Saros 131)
December 26, 2019 (Saros 132)	November 25, 2030 (Saros 133)	October 25, 2041 (Saros 134)	September 22, 2052 (Saros 135)	August 24, 2063 (Saros 136)
July 24, 2074 (Saros 137)	June 22, 2085 (Saros 138)	May 22, 2096 (Saros 139)	April 23, 2107 (Saros 140)	March 22, 2118 (Saros 141)
February 18, 2129 (Saros 142)	January 20, 2140 (Saros 143)	December 19, 2150 (Saros 144)	November 17, 2161 (Saros 145)	October 17, 2172 (Saros 146)
September 16, 2183 (Saros 147)	August 16, 2194 (Saros 148)			

=== Inex series ===
This eclipse is a part of the long period inex cycle, repeating at alternating nodes, every 358 synodic months (≈ 10,571.95 days, or 29 years minus 20 days). Their appearance and longitude are irregular due to a lack of synchronization with the anomalistic month (period of perigee). However, groupings of 3 inex cycles (≈ 87 years minus 2 months) comes close (≈ 1,151.02 anomalistic months), so eclipses are similar in these groupings.

Series members between 1801 and 2200
April 4, 1810 (Saros 126)	March 15, 1839 (Saros 127)	February 23, 1868 (Saros 128)
February 1, 1897 (Saros 129)	January 14, 1926 (Saros 130)	December 25, 1954 (Saros 131)
December 4, 1983 (Saros 132)	November 13, 2012 (Saros 133)	October 25, 2041 (Saros 134)
October 4, 2070 (Saros 135)	September 14, 2099 (Saros 136)	August 25, 2128 (Saros 137)
August 5, 2157 (Saros 138)	July 16, 2186 (Saros 139)	
