= List of lunar eclipses in the 21st century =

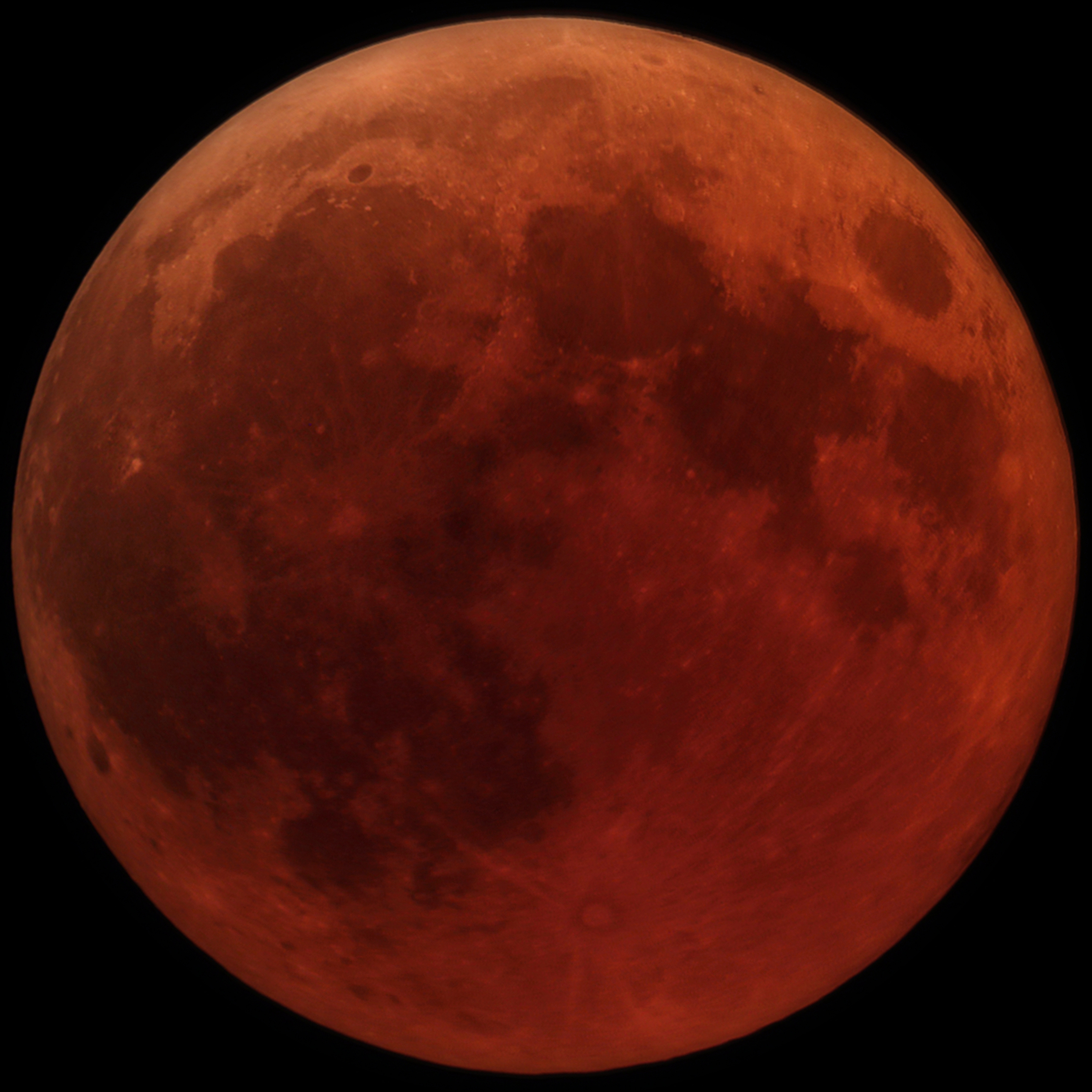
Total lunar eclipse of July 27, 2018, from Italy.

During the 21st century, there will be 228 lunar eclipses of which 86 will be penumbral, 57 will be partial and 85 will be total. Of the total eclipses, 24 will be central, in the sense that the Moon will pass through the very center (axis) of the Earth's shadow (for more information see gamma). In the 21st century, the greatest number of eclipses in one year is four, in 2009, 2020, 2038, 2056, 2085, and 2096. The predictions given here are by Fred Espenak of NASA's Goddard Space Flight Center.

The longest measured duration in which the Earth completely covered the Moon, known as totality, was during the lunar eclipse of July 27, 2018. This total lunar eclipse had a maximum duration of 1 hour, 42 minutes, and 57 seconds. The longest possible duration of a total lunar eclipse is 1 hour and 47 minutes.^{[a]}

Lunar eclipses in the 21st century

The table contains the date and time of the greatest eclipse (in dynamical time, which in this case is the time when the axis of the Earth's shadow passes over the Moon; this is in (Ephemeris Time). The number of the saros series that the eclipse belongs to is given, followed by the type of the eclipse (either total, partial or penumbral), the gamma of the eclipse (how centrally the Moon passed through the Earth's shadow), and both the penumbral and umbral magnitude of the eclipse (the fraction of the Moon's diameter obscured by the Earth). For each eclipse, the duration of the eclipse is given, as well as the eclipse's contacts (the points at which the Moon reaches and exits the Earth's penumbra and umbra).

Eclipses are listed in sets by lunar years, repeating every 12 months for each node. Ascending node eclipses are given a red background highlight, and descending node eclipses are given a blue background highlight.

== Eclipses ==
Date	Time of greatest eclipse (Terrestrial Time)	Saros	Type	Gamma	Magnitude		Duration (hr:min)		Contacts (UTC) (hr:min)				Chart	Visibility	Ref(s)
Date	Time of greatest eclipse (Terrestrial Time)	Saros	Type	Gamma	Pen.	Umb.	Par.	Tot.	U1	U2	U3	U4	Chart	Visibility	Ref(s)
January 9, 2001	20:20:35	134	Total	0.3720	2.1631	1.1902	3:16	1:01	18:42	19:50	20:51	21:59			^{[a]}
July 5, 2001	14:55:19	139	Partial	−0.7287	1.5490	0.4961	2:43	—	13:36	—		16:15			^{[a]}
December 30, 2001	10:29:18	144	Penumbral	1.0731	0.8948	−0.1141	—		—						^{[a]}
May 26, 2002	12:03:22	111	Penumbral	1.1758	0.6910	−0.2871	—		—						^{[a]}
June 24, 2002	21:27:09	149	Penumbral	−1.4439	0.2110	−0.7910	—		—						^{[a]}
November 20, 2002	01:46:36	116	Penumbral	−1.1126	0.8618	−0.2246	—		—						^{[a]}
May 16, 2003	03:40:09	121	Total	0.4123	2.0765	1.1294	3:14	0:51	02:03	03:14	04:06	05:17			^{[a]}
November 9, 2003	01:18:34	126	Total	−0.4319	2.1158	1.0197	3:31	0:22	23:33	01:07	01:30	03:04			^{[a]}
May 4, 2004	20:30:13	131	Total	−0.3132	2.2645	1.3035	3:23	1:15	18:49	19:52	21:08	22:12			^{[a]}
October 28, 2004	03:04:07	136	Total	0.2846	2.3656	1.3100	3:39	1:25	01:15	02:24	03:44	04:53			^{[a]}
April 24, 2005	09:54:51	141	Penumbral	−1.0885	0.8669	−0.1417	—		—						^{[a]}
October 17, 2005	12:03:22	146	Partial	0.9796	1.0605	0.0645	0:56	—	11:35	—		12:31			^{[a]}
March 14, 2006	23:47:29	113	Penumbral	1.0210	1.0321	−0.0584	—		—						^{[a]}
September 7, 2006	18:51:19	118	Partial	−0.9262	1.1349	0.1837	1:31	—	18:06	—		19:37			^{[a]}
March 3, 2007	23:20:54	123	Total	0.3175	2.3208	1.2347	3:41	1:13	21:30	22:44	23:58	01:11			^{[a]}
August 28, 2007	10:37:21	128	Total	−0.2145	2.4545	1.4777	3:32	1:30	08:51	09:52	11:22	12:23			^{[a]}
February 21, 2008	03:26:03	133	Total	−0.3992	2.1470	1.1081	3:25	0:50	01:43	03:01	03:51	05:09			^{[a]}
August 16, 2008	21:10:06	138	Partial	0.5646	1.8385	0.8095	3:08	—	19:36	—		22:44			^{[a]}
February 9, 2009	14:38:16	143	Penumbral	−1.0640	0.9013	−0.0863	—		—						^{[a]}
July 7, 2009	09:38:36	110	Penumbral	−1.4915	0.1578	−0.9116	—		—						^{[a]}
August 6, 2009	00:39:11	148	Penumbral	1.3572	0.4038	−0.6642	—		—						^{[a]}
December 31, 2009	19:22:39	115	Partial	0.9765	1.0572	0.0779	1:00	—	18:53	—		19:53			^{[a]}
June 26, 2010	11:38:27	120	Partial	−0.7091	1.5789	0.5383	2:43	—	10:17	—		13:00			^{[a]}
December 21, 2010	08:16:57	125	Total	0.3213	2.2822	1.2576	3:29	1:12	06:33	07:41	08:53	10:01			^{[a]}
June 15, 2011	20:12:36	130	Total	0.0897	2.6883	1.7014	3:39	1:40	18:23	19:22	21:03	22:02			^{[a]}
December 10, 2011	14:31:49	135	Total	−0.3882	2.1875	1.1076	3:32	0:51	12:46	14:06	14:57	16:18			^{[a]}
June 4, 2012	11:03:12	140	Partial	0.8248	1.3198	0.3718	2:07	—	10:00	—		12:06			^{[a]}
November 28, 2012	14:32:59	145	Penumbral	−1.0869	0.9169	−0.1859	—		—						^{[a]}
April 25, 2013	20:07:29	112	Partial	−1.0121	0.9878	0.0160	0:27	—	19:54	—		20:21			^{[a]}
May 25, 2013	04:09:58	150	Penumbral	1.5350	0.0170	−0.9322	—		—						^{[a]}
October 18, 2013	23:50:17	117	Penumbral	1.1508	0.7660	−0.2706	—		—						^{[a]}
April 15, 2014	07:45:39	122	Total	−0.3017	2.3193	1.2918	3:35	1:18	05:58	07:07	08:25	09:33			^{[a]}
October 8, 2014	10:54:35	127	Total	0.3826	2.1467	1.1670	3:20	0:59	09:15	10:25	11:24	12:34			^{[a]}
April 4, 2015	12:00:15	132	Total	0.4460	2.0802	1.0019	3:29	0:05	10:16	11:58	12:03	13:45			^{[a]}
September 28, 2015	02:47:08	137	Total	−0.3296	2.2307	1.2774	3:20	1:12	01:07	02:11	03:23	04:27			^{[a]}
March 23, 2016	11:47:12	142	Penumbral	1.1592	0.7759	−0.3107	—		—						^{[a]}
August 18, 2016	09:42:24	109	Penumbral	1.5590	0.0166	−0.9925	—		—						
September 16, 2016	18:54:17	147	Penumbral	1.0548	0.9091	−0.0624	—		—						^{[a]}
February 11, 2017	00:43:53	114	Penumbral	−1.0254	0.9896	−0.0342	—		—						^{[a]}
August 7, 2017	18:20:28	119	Partial	0.8668	1.2899	0.2477	1:55	—	17:23	—		19:18			^{[a]}
January 31, 2018	13:29:50	124	Total	−0.3014	2.2954	1.3155	3:23	1:16	11:48	12:52	14:08	15:11			^{[a]}
July 27, 2018	20:21:44	129	Total	0.1168	2.6805	1.6100	3:55	1:43	18:24	19:30	21:13	22:19			^{[a]}
January 21, 2019	05:12:16	134	Total	0.3684	2.1697	1.1966	3:17	1:02	03:34	04:41	05:43	06:51			^{[a]}
July 16, 2019	21:30:44	139	Partial	−0.6430	1.7050	0.6544	2:58	—	20:02	—		23:00			^{[a]}
January 10, 2020	19:09:59	144	Penumbral	1.0726	0.8969	−0.1146	—		—						^{[a]}
June 5, 2020	19:25:02	111	Penumbral	1.2406	0.5699	−0.4036	—		—						^{[a]}
July 5, 2020	04:30:00	149	Penumbral	−1.3639	0.3560	−0.6422	—		—						^{[a]}
November 30, 2020	09:42:49	116	Penumbral	−1.1309	0.8302	−0.2602	—		—						^{[a]}
May 26, 2021	11:18:40	121	Total	0.4774	1.9558	1.0112	3:07	0:15	09:45	11:11	11:26	12:52			^{[a]}
November 19, 2021	09:02:53	126	Partial	−0.4552	2.0738	0.9760	3:28	—	07:19	—		10:47			^{[a]}
May 16, 2022	04:11:28	131	Total	−0.2532	2.3743	1.4155	3:27	1:25	02:28	03:29	04:54	05:55			^{[a]}
November 8, 2022	10:59:09	136	Total	0.2570	2.4162	1.3607	3:01	1:25	09:09	10:17	11:42	12:49			^{[a]}
May 5, 2023	17:22:51	141	Penumbral	−1.0349	0.9655	−0.0438	—		—						^{[a]}
October 28, 2023	20:14:03	146	Partial	0.9471	1.1200	0.1234	1:17	—	19:35	—		20:53			^{[a]}
March 25, 2024	07:12:45	113	Penumbral	1.0609	0.9577	−0.1304	—		—						^{[a]}
September 18, 2024	02:44:14	118	Partial	−0.9792	1.0392	0.0869	1:03	—	02:13	—		03:16			^{[a]}
March 14, 2025	06:58:45	123	Total	0.3485	2.2614	1.1804	3:39	1:06	05:09	06:26	07:32	08:48			^{[a]}
September 7, 2025	18:11:43	128	Total	−0.2752	2.3459	1.3638	3:29	1:22	16:27	17:31	18:53	19:56			^{[a]}
March 3, 2026	11:33:37	133	Total	−0.3765	2.1858	1.1526	3:27	0:58	09:50	11:04	12:03	13:17			^{[a]}
August 28, 2026	04:12:49	138	Partial	−0.4694	1.9664	0.9319	3:18	—	02:34	—		05:52			^{[a]}
February 20, 2027	23:12:51	143	Penumbral	−1.0480	0.9286	−0.0549	—		—						^{[a]}
July 18, 2027	16:02:53	110	Penumbral	−1.5759	0.0032	−1.0662	—		—						^{[a]}
August 17, 2027	07:13:43	148	Penumbral	1.2797	0.5476	−0.5234	—		—						^{[a]}
January 12, 2028	04:12:57	115	Partial	0.9817	1.0485	0.0679	0:56	—	03:45	—		04:41			^{[a]}
July 6, 2028	18:19:41	120	Partial	−0.7904	1.4282	0.3908	2:22	—	17:09	—		19:30			^{[a]}
December 31, 2028	16:51:58	125	Total	0.3258	2.2758	1.2479	3:29	1:11	15:08	16:16	17:28	18:36			^{[a]}
June 26, 2029	03:22:05	130	Total	0.0124	2.8282	1.8452	3:40	1:42	01:32	02:31	04:13	05:12			^{[a]}
December 20, 2029	22:43:12	135	Total	−0.3811	2.2023	1.1190	3:33	0:53	20:57	22:16	23:10	00:30			^{[a]}
June 15, 2030	18:34:34	140	Partial	0.7534	1.4495	0.5025	2:24	—	17:22	—		19:47			^{[a]}
December 9, 2030	22:28:51	145	Penumbral	−1.0732	0.9430	−0.1613	—		—						^{[a]}
May 7, 2031	03:41:03	112	Penumbral	−1.0694	0.8827	−0.0892	—		—						^{[a]}
June 5, 2031	11:45:17	150	Penumbral	1.4732	0.1306	−0.8185	—		—						^{[a]}
October 30, 2031	07:46:45	117	Penumbral	1.1774	0.7173	−0.3193	—		—						^{[a]}
April 25, 2032	15:14:51	122	Total	−0.3558	2.2204	1.1925	3:31	1:06	13:28	14:41	15:46	16:59			^{[a]}
October 18, 2032	19:03:40	127	Total	0.4169	2.0841	1.1039	3:16	0:47	17:26	18:40	19:27	20:42			^{[a]}
April 14, 2033	19:13:51	132	Total	0.3954	2.1722	1.0955	3:35	0:49	17:26	18:49	19:38	21:01			^{[a]}
October 8, 2033	10:56:23	137	Total	−0.2889	2.3068	1.3508	3:22	1:19	09:15	10:17	11:36	12:38			^{[a]}
April 3, 2034	19:06:59	142	Penumbral	1.1144	0.8557	−0.2263	—		—						^{[a]}
September 28, 2034	02:47:37	147	Partial	−1.0110	0.9922	0.0155	0:27	—	02:34	—		03:01			^{[a]}
February 22, 2035	09:06:12	114	Penumbral	−1.0357	0.9663	−0.0523	—		—						^{[a]}
August 19, 2035	01:12:15	119	Partial	0.9433	1.1519	0.1049	1:17	—	00:34	—		01:51			^{[a]}
February 11, 2036	22:13:06	124	Total	−0.3110	2.2762	1.3007	3:21	1:12	20:32	21:36	22:50	23:54			^{[a]}
August 7, 2036	02:52:32	129	Total	0.2004	2.5279	1.4556	4:01	1:35	00:57	02:05	03:40	04:48			^{[a]}
January 31, 2037	14:00:16	134	Total	0.3619	2.1815	1.2086	3:17	1:04	12:22	13:28	14:32	15:39			^{[a]}
July 27, 2037	04:09:53	139	Partial	−0.5582	1.8597	0.8108	3:12	—	02:34	—		05:46			^{[a]}
January 21, 2038	03:49:52	144	Penumbral	1.0710	0.9009	−0.1127	—		—						^{[a]}
June 17, 2038	02:43:44	111	Penumbral	1.3082	0.4438	−0.5259	—		—						^{[a]}
July 16, 2038	11:35:56	149	Penumbral	−1.2837	0.5013	−0.4938	—		—						^{[a]}
December 11, 2038	17:45:00	116	Penumbral	−1.1448	0.8062	−0.2876	—		—						^{[a]}
June 6, 2039	18:54:25	121	Partial	0.5460	1.8289	0.8863	2:59	—	17:25	—		20:24			^{[a]}
November 30, 2039	16:56:28	126	Partial	−0.4721	2.0435	0.9443	3:26	—	15:13	—		18:39			^{[a]}
May 26, 2040	11:46:22	131	Total	−0.1872	2.4955	1.5365	3:31	1:32	10:01	11:00	12:32	13:32			^{[a]}
November 18, 2040	19:04:40	136	Total	0.2361	2.4543	1.3991	3:40	1:27	17:14	18:21	19:49	20:55			^{[a]}
May 16, 2041	00:41:37	141	Partial	−0.9746	1.0765	0.0663	0:58	—	00:13	—		01:11			^{[a]}
November 8, 2041	04:33:39	146	Partial	0.9212	1.1675	0.1714	1:30	—	03:48	—		05:19			^{[a]}
April 5, 2042	14:28:45	113	Penumbral	1.1080	0.8700	−0.2156	—		—						^{[a]}
September 29, 2042	10:44:20	118	Penumbral	−1.0261	0.9548	−0.0011	—		—						^{[a]}
October 28, 2042	19:33:00	156	Penumbral	1.5570	0.0080	−0.9740	—		—						
March 25, 2043	14:30:36	123	Total	0.3849	2.1920	1.1161	3:35	0:53	12:43	14:04	14:57	16:18			^{[a]}
September 19, 2043	01:50:22	128	Total	−0.3316	2.2452	1.2575	3:26	1:12	00:07	01:15	02:26	03:33			^{[a]}
March 13, 2044	19:37:05	133	Total	−0.3496	2.2322	1.2050	3:29	1:06	17:53	19:04	20:10	21:22			^{[a]}
September 7, 2044	11:19:16	138	Total	0.4318	2.0879	1.0456	3:26	0:34	09:36	11:02	11:36	13:02			^{[a]}
March 3, 2045	07:43:26	143	Penumbral	−1.0274	0.9643	−0.0148	—		—						^{[a]}
August 27, 2045	13:53:21	148	Penumbral	1.2060	0.6845	−0.3899	—		—						^{[a]}
January 22, 2046	13:01:07	115	Partial	0.9885	1.0365	0.0550	0:50	—	12:36	—		13:26			^{[a]}
July 18, 2046	01:04:36	120	Partial	−0.8691	1.2824	0.2478	1:55	—	00:07	—		02:02			^{[a]}
January 12, 2047	01:24:44	125	Total	0.3317	2.2665	1.2358	3:29	1:10	23:40	00:50	02:00	03:09			^{[a]}
July 7, 2047	10:34:15	130	Total	−0.0636	2.7326	1.7529	3:39	1:41	08:45	09:44	11:25	12:23			^{[a]}
January 1, 2048	06:52:24	135	Total	−0.3745	2.2158	1.1297	3:34	0:56	05:05	06:24	07:20	08:40			^{[a]}
June 26, 2048	02:00:57	140	Partial	0.6796	1.5841	0.6404	2:39	—	00:41	—		03:21			^{[a]}
December 20, 2048	06:26:16	145	Penumbral	−1.0624	0.9632	−0.1420	—		—						^{[a]}
May 17, 2049	11:25:06	112	Penumbral	−1.1337	0.7651	−0.2073	—		—						^{[a]}
June 15, 2049	19:12:40	150	Penumbral	1.4068	0.2526	−0.6970	—		—						^{[a]}
November 9, 2049	15:50:39	117	Penumbral	1.1964	0.6821	−0.3541	—		—						^{[a]}
May 6, 2050	22:30:28	122	Total	−0.4181	2.1064	1.0779	3:26	0:43	20:48	22:09	22:52	00:14			^{[a]}
October 30, 2050	03:20:12	127	Total	0.4435	2.0356	1.0549	3:13	0:35	01:44	03:03	03:37	04:57			^{[a]}
April 26, 2051	02:14:52	132	Total	0.3371	2.2785	1.2034	3:41	1:10	00:24	01:40	02:50	04:05			^{[a]}
October 19, 2051	19:10:13	137	Total	−0.2542	2.3719	1.4130	3:24	1:24	17:28	18:28	19:52	20:52			^{[a]}
April 14, 2052	02:16:28	142	Penumbral	1.0628	0.9478	−0.1294	—		—						^{[a]}
October 8, 2052	10:44:19	147	Partial	−0.9726	1.0653	0.0821	1:03	—	10:13	—		11:16			^{[a]}
March 4, 2053	17:20:31	114	Penumbral	−1.0530	0.9334	−0.0796	—		—						^{[a]}
August 29, 2053	08:04:22	119	Penumbral	1.0165	1.0203	−0.0319	—		—						^{[a]}
February 22, 2054	06:49:46	124	Total	−0.3242	2.2502	1.2781	3:21	1:12	05:09	06:14	07:26	08:30			^{[a]}
August 18, 2054	09:24:48	129	Total	0.2806	2.3817	1.3074	3:47	1:23	07:32	08:43	10:06	11:18			^{[a]}
February 11, 2055	22:44:34	134	Total	0.3526	2.1982	1.2258	3:18	1:06	21:05	22:12	23:18	00:24			^{[a]}
August 7, 2055	10:53:18	139	Partial	−0.4769	2.0081	0.9606	3:23	—	09:10	—		12:33			^{[a]}
February 1, 2056	12:24:20	144	Penumbral	1.0682	0.9056	−0.1096	—		—						^{[a]}
June 27, 2056	10:01:23	111	Penumbral	1.3769	0.3143	−0.6519	—		—						^{[a]}
July 26, 2056	18:41:38	149	Penumbral	−1.2048	0.6435	−0.3489	—		—						^{[a]}
December 22, 2056	01:47:09	116	Penumbral	−1.1559	0.7857	−0.3109	—		—						^{[a]}
June 17, 2057	02:24:32	121	Partial	0.6167	1.6967	0.7555	2:49	—	01:00	—		03:49			^{[a]}
December 11, 2057	00:51:49	126	Partial	−0.4853	2.0178	0.9181	3:24	—	23:10	—		02:34			^{[a]}
June 6, 2058	19:13:58	131	Total	−0.1181	2.6210	1.6611	3:33	1:37	17:27	18:25	20:03	21:01			^{[a]}
November 30, 2058	03:14:27	136	Total	0.2208	2.4802	1.4260	3:41	1:30	01:24	02:30	03:59	05:05			^{[a]}
May 27, 2059	07:53:42	141	Partial	−0.9097	1.1946	0.1829	1:37	—	07:05	—		08:42			^{[a]}
November 19, 2059	12:59:43	146	Partial	0.9004	1.2037	0.2079	1:39	—	12:10	—		13:49			^{[a]}
April 15, 2060	21:35:10	113	Penumbral	1.1621	0.7674	−0.3156	—		—						^{[a]}
October 9, 2060	18:51:37	118	Penumbral	−1.0670	0.8796	−0.0799	—		—						^{[a]}
November 8, 2060	04:02:20	156	Penumbral	1.5332	0.0266	−0.9375	—		—						^{[a]}
April 4, 2061	21:52:09	123	Total	0.4300	2.1044	1.0341	3:30	0:30	20:07	21:37	22:07	23:37			^{[a]}
September 29, 2061	09:36:16	128	Total	−0.3810	2.1556	1.1621	3:22	0:59	07:55	09:07	10:06	11:18			^{[a]}
March 25, 2062	03:31:52	133	Total	−0.3150	2.2905	1.2695	3:31	1:15	01:46	02:55	04:09	05:18			^{[a]}
September 18, 2062	18:32:03	138	Total	0.3735	2.1959	1.1496	3:32	1:00	16:46	18:02	19:02	20:18			^{[a]}
March 14, 2063	16:03:49	143	Partial	−1.0007	1.0088	0.0342	0:41	—	15:43	—		16:24			^{[a]}
September 7, 2063	20:39:11	148	Penumbral	1.1374	0.8101	−0.2678	—		—						^{[a]}
February 2, 2064	21:46:55	115	Partial	0.9969	1.0197	0.0377	0:43	—	21:26	—		22:08			^{[a]}
July 28, 2064	07:50:45	120	Partial	−0.9473	1.1361	0.1038	1:16	—	07:13	—		08:28			^{[a]}
January 22, 2065	09:56:54	125	Total	0.3371	2.2561	1.2231	3:29	1:09	08:12	09:23	10:31	11:41			^{[a]}
July 17, 2065	17:46:35	130	Total	−0.1402	2.5890	1.6121	3:36	1:37	15:58	16:58	18:35	19:35			^{[a]}
January 11, 2066	15:02:41	135	Total	−0.3687	2.2259	1.1378	3:35	0:58	13:15	14:34	15:32	16:50			^{[a]}
July 7, 2066	09:28:22	140	Partial	0.6055	1.7179	0.7753	2:51	—	08:03	—		10:54			^{[a]}
December 31, 2066	14:28:02	145	Penumbral	−1.0539	0.9773	−0.1281	—		—						^{[a]}
May 28, 2067	18:53:58	112	Penumbral	−1.2012	0.6403	−0.3329	—		—						^{[a]}
June 27, 2067	02:38:57	150	Penumbral	1.3394	0.3754	−0.5753	—		—						^{[a]}
November 21, 2067	00:02:32	117	Penumbral	1.2106	0.6544	−0.3811	—		—						^{[a]}
May 17, 2068	05:40:06	122	Partial	−0.4851	1.9826	0.9532	3:19	—	04:01	—		07:20			^{[a]}
November 9, 2068	11:44:47	127	Total	0.4645	1.9962	1.0149	3:10	0:18	10:10	11:36	11:54	13:20			^{[a]}
May 6, 2069	09:07:43	132	Total	0.2717	2.3965	1.3229	3:46	1:24	07:15	08:26	09:50	11:01			^{[a]}
October 30, 2069	03:32:51	137	Total	−0.2263	2.4235	1.4616	3:26	1:27	01:50	02:49	04:16	05:16			^{[a]}
April 25, 2070	09:19:09	142	Penumbral	1.0044	0.0515	−0.0209	—		—						^{[a]}
October 19, 2070	18:48:55	147	Partial	−0.9406	1.1258	0.1383	1:22	—	18:08	—		19:30			^{[a]}
March 16, 2071	01:28:52	114	Penumbral	−1.0756	0.8879	−0.1194	—		—						^{[a]}
September 9, 2071	15:03:22	119	Penumbral	1.0834	0.8989	−0.1586	—		—						^{[a]}
March 4, 2072	15:20:48	124	Total	−0.3430	2.2127	1.2441	3:19	1:08	13:41	14:47	15:55	17:01			^{[a]}
August 28, 2072	16:03:22	129	Total	0.3563	2.2428	1.1662	3:40	1:04	14:13	15:31	16:35	17:53			^{[a]}
February 22, 2073	07:22:31	134	Total	0.3388	2.2218	1.2503	3:20	1:09	05:43	06:48	07:57	09:02			^{[a]}
August 17, 2073	17:40:19	139	Total	−0.3998	2.1479	1.1013	3:32	0:50	15:55	17:15	18:05	19:26			^{[a]}
February 11, 2074	20:53:34	144	Penumbral	1.0611	0.9191	−0.0972	—		—						^{[a]}
July 8, 2074	17:19:13	111	Penumbral	1.4456	0.1870	−0.7765	—		—						^{[a]}
August 7, 2074	01:53:39	149	Penumbral	−1.1291	0.7813	−0.2091	—		—						^{[a]}
January 2, 2075	09:52:38	116	Penumbral	−1.1642	0.7714	−0.3271	—		—						^{[a]}
June 28, 2075	09:53:09	121	Partial	0.6897	1.5624	0.6220	2:37	—	08:35	—		11:12			^{[a]}
December 22, 2075	08:53:27	126	Partial	−0.4945	2.0008	0.9013	3:23	—	07:12	—		10:35			^{[a]}
June 17, 2076	02:37:18	131	Total	−0.0452	2.7554	1.7943	3:35	1:40	00:50	01:47	03:27	04:25			^{[a]}
December 10, 2076	11:32:22	136	Total	0.2102	2.4990	1.4460	3:41	1:31	09:42	10:47	12:18	13:23			^{[a]}
June 6, 2077	14:57:21	141	Partial	−0.8387	1.3257	0.3123	2:05	—	13:55	—		16:00			^{[a]}
November 29, 2077	21:33:21	146	Partial	0.8854	1.2309	0.2356	1:45	—	20:41	—		22:26			^{[a]}
April 27, 2078	04:33:11	113	Penumbral	1.2222	0.6558	−0.4246	—		—						^{[a]}
October 21, 2078	03:05:29	118	Penumbral	−1.1021	0.8171	−0.1462	—		—						^{[a]}
November 19, 2078	12:37:30	156	Penumbral	1.5147	0.0615	−0.9047	—		—						^{[a]}
April 16, 2079	05:08:10	123	Partial	0.4799	2.0100	0.9451	3:23	—	03:26	—		06:50			^{[a]}
October 10, 2079	17:27:54	128	Total	−0.4246	2.0786	1.0791	3:19	0:42	15:49	17:07	17:49	19:07			^{[a]}
April 4, 2080	11:21:01	133	Total	−0.2751	2.3607	1.3460	3:34	1:22	09:34	10:40	12:02	13:08			^{[a]}
September 29, 2080	01:50:03	138	Total	0.3203	2.2967	1.2443	3:37	1:14	00:01	01:13	02:27	03:39			^{[a]}
March 25, 2081	00:19:22	143	Partial	−0.9687	1.0652	0.0953	1:07	—	23:46	—		00:53			^{[a]}
September 18, 2081	03:32:45	148	Penumbral	1.0747	0.9270	−0.1545	—		—						^{[a]}
February 13, 2082	06:26:37	115	Partial	1.0101	0.9955	0.0134	0:26	—	06:14	—		06:39			^{[a]}
August 8, 2082	14:43:59	120	Penumbral	−1.0203	1.0011	−0.0294	—		—						^{[a]}
February 2, 2083	18:24:02	125	Total	0.3463	2.2400	1.2052	3:29	1:07	16:40	17:51	18:57	20:08			^{[a]}
July 29, 2083	01:02:50	130	Total	−0.2143	2.4520	1.4773	3:33	1:30	23:16	00:18	01:48	02:49			^{[a]}
January 22, 2084	23:10:14	135	Total	−0.3610	2.2407	1.1513	3:36	1:01	21:22	22:40	23:41	00:58			^{[a]}
July 17, 2084	16:56:04	140	Partial	0.5312	1.8540	0.9119	3:01	—	15:25	—		18:27			^{[a]}
January 10, 2085	22:29:42	145	Penumbral	−1.0453	0.9927	−0.1119	—		—						^{[a]}
June 8, 2085	02:14:47	112	Penumbral	−1.2745	0.5065	−0.4682	—		—						^{[a]}
July 7, 2085	10:01:51	150	Penumbral	1.2694	0.5047	−0.4478	—		—						^{[a]}
December 1, 2085	08:22:45	117	Penumbral	1.2189	0.6387	−0.3957	—		—						^{[a]}
May 28, 2086	12:40:56	122	Partial	−0.5585	1.8486	0.8180	3:09	—	11:06	—		14:16			^{[a]}
November 20, 2086	20:16:50	127	Partial	0.4799	1.9679	0.9865	3:08	—	18:43	—		21:51			^{[a]}
May 17, 2087	15:52:27	132	Total	0.1999	2.5276	1.4554	3:51	1:35	13:57	15:05	16:40	17:48			^{[a]}
November 10, 2087	12:02:39	137	Total	−0.2043	2.4654	1.5006	3:27	1:29	10:19	11:18	12:47	13:46			^{[a]}
May 5, 2088	16:13:54	142	Partial	0.9387	1.1695	0.1019	1:17	—	15:35	—		16:52			^{[a]}
October 30, 2088	03:00:23	147	Partial	−0.9147	1.1761	0.1831	1:34	—	02:14	—		03:47			^{[a]}
March 26, 2089	09:31:16	114	Penumbral	−1.1038	0.8332	−0.1681	—		—						^{[a]}
September 19, 2089	22:08:18	119	Penumbral	1.1447	0.7893	−0.2737	—		—						^{[a]}
March 15, 2090	23:45:31	124	Total	−0.3674	2.1659	1.2012	3:17	1:03	22:07	23:14	00:17	01:24			^{[a]}
September 8, 2090	22:49:29	129	Total	0.4257	2.1167	1.0377	3:33	0:32	21:03	22:34	23:05	00:36			^{[a]}
March 5, 2091	15:55:21	134	Total	0.3212	2.2537	1.2832	3:21	1:13	14:15	15:19	16:32	17:36			^{[a]}
August 29, 2091	00:35:22	139	Total	−0.3270	2.2810	1.2351	3:38	1:13	22:47	23:59	01:12	02:24			^{[a]}
February 23, 2092	05:17:55	144	Penumbral	1.0509	0.9383	−0.0789	—		—						^{[a]}
July 19, 2092	00:38:53	111	Penumbral	1.5131	0.0620	−0.8992	—		—						^{[a]}
August 17, 2092	09:10:54	149	Penumbral	−1.0568	0.9131	−0.0757	—		—						^{[a]}
January 12, 2093	17:56:56	116	Penumbral	−1.1733	0.7553	−0.3444	—		—						^{[a]}
July 8, 2093	17:21:10	121	Partial	0.7632	1.4275	0.4872	2:22	—	16:10	—		18:32			^{[a]}
January 1, 2094	16:56:58	126	Partial	−0.5024	1.9858	0.8872	3:21	—	15:16	—		18:38			^{[a]}
June 28, 2094	09:58:47	131	Total	0.0288	2.7865	1.8234	3:36	1:41	08:11	09:08	10:49	11:47			^{[a]}
December 21, 2094	19:53:21	136	Total	0.2016	2.5138	1.4627	3:40	1:32	18:03	19:08	20:39	21:44			^{[a]}
June 17, 2095	21:56:59	141	Partial	−0.7653	1.4617	0.4459	2:27	—	20:44	—		23:11			^{[a]}
December 11, 2095	06:11:49	146	Partial	0.8742	1.2510	0.2565	1:49	—	05:17	—		07:06			^{[a]}
May 7, 2096	11:21:29	113	Penumbral	1.2896	0.5309	−0.5469	—		—						^{[a]}
June 6, 2096	02:40:27	151	Penumbral	−1.5723	0.0047	−1.0584	—		—						^{[a]}
October 31, 2096	11:27:08	118	Penumbral	−1.1307	0.7666	−0.2006	—		—						^{[a]}
November 29, 2096	21:19:07	156	Penumbral	1.5017	0.0862	−0.8816	—		—						^{[a]}
April 26, 2097	12:15:01	123	Partial	0.5377	1.9013	0.8420	3:15	—	10:37	—		13:53			^{[a]}
October 21, 2097	01:27:38	128	Total	−0.4608	2.0152	1.0097	3:15	0:15	23:50	01:20	01:35	03:05			^{[a]}
April 15, 2098	19:01:30	133	Total	−0.2272	2.4454	1.4369	3:36	1:29	17:14	18:17	19:46	20:49			^{[a]}
October 10, 2098	09:16:39	138	Total	0.2749	2.3831	1.3246	3:41	1:23	07:26	08:35	09:58	11:07			^{[a]}
April 5, 2099	08:27:36	143	Partial	−0.9304	1.1333	0.1680	1:28	—	07:44	—		09:12			^{[a]}
September 29, 2099	10:33:16	148	Penumbral	1.0174	1.0340	−0.0512	—		—						^{[a]}
February 24, 2100	15:01:49	115	Penumbral	1.0267	0.9649	−0.0170	—		—						^{[a]}
August 19, 2100	21:41:35	120	Penumbral	−1.0905	0.8716	−0.1575	—		—						^{[a]}

== See also ==
- Lists of lunar eclipses
- Lunar eclipses by century
- List of lunar eclipses in the 19th century
- List of lunar eclipses in the 20th century
- List of lunar eclipses in the 22nd century
