= Solar eclipse of February 26, 2017 =

2017 annular solar eclipse in South America and Africa

- Annular eclipse
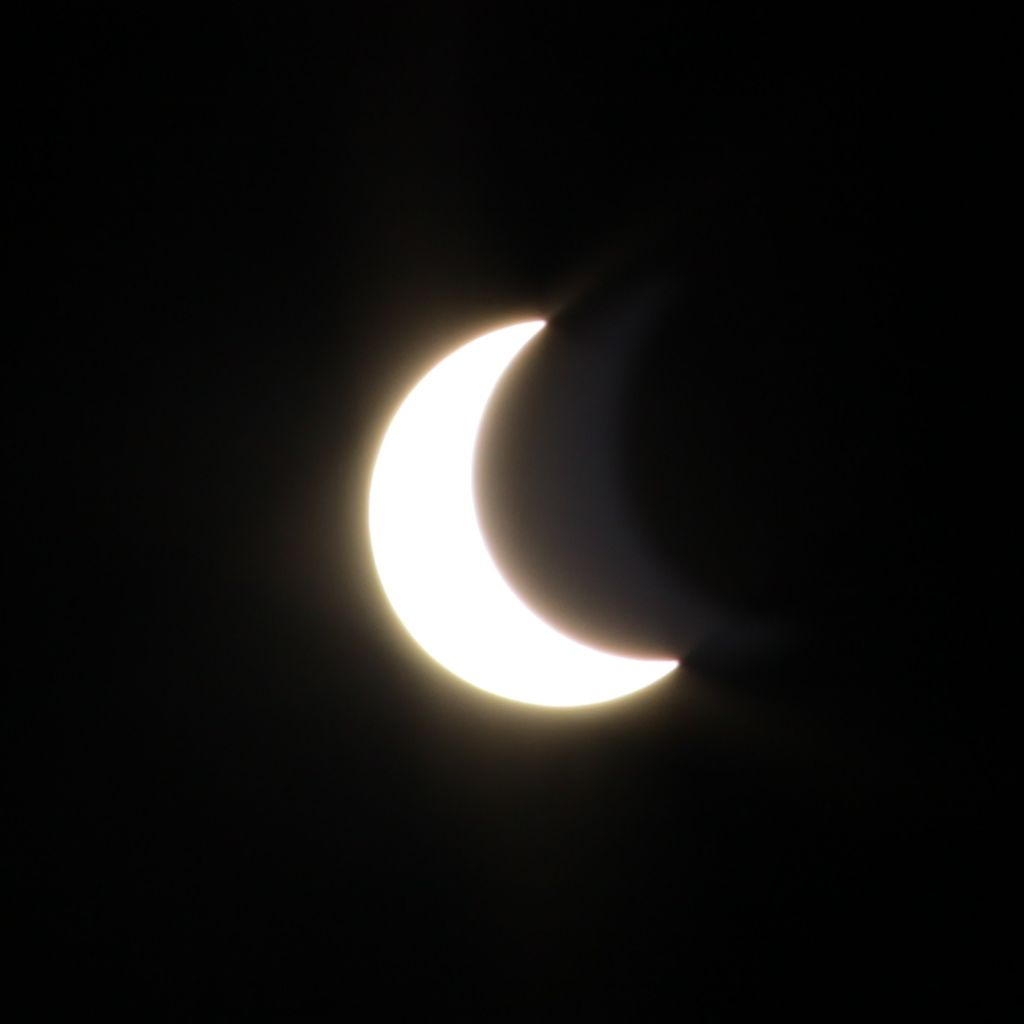
- Partial from Buenos Aires, Argentina

- Map
- Gamma: −0.4578
- Magnitude: 0.9922

Maximum eclipse
- Duration: 44 s (0 min 44 s)
- Coordinates: 34.7°S 31.2°W
- Max. width of band: 31 km (19 mi)

Times (UTC)
- Greatest eclipse: 14:54:33

References
- Saros: 140 (29 of 71)
- Catalog # (SE5000): 9545

An annular solar eclipse occurred at the Moon's descending node of orbit on Sunday, February 26, 2017, with a magnitude of 0.9922. A solar eclipse occurs when the Moon passes between Earth and the Sun, thereby totally or partly obscuring the image of the Sun for a viewer on Earth. An annular solar eclipse occurs when the Moon's apparent diameter is smaller than the Sun's, blocking most of the Sun's light and causing the Sun to look like an annulus (ring). An annular eclipse appears as a partial eclipse over a region of the Earth thousands of kilometres wide. Occurring about 4.9 days before perigee (on March 3, 2017, at 13:30 UTC), the Moon's apparent diameter was larger.

The eclipse was visible across southern Chile and Argentina in the morning and ended in Angola and southwestern Katanga, Democratic Republic of the Congo at sunset. In Argentina, the best places to see the eclipse were located in the south of the Chubut Province, in the towns of Facundo, Sarmiento and Camarones. A partial eclipse was visible for parts of southern South America, southern and western Africa, and Antarctica.

== Images ==

Animation assembled from 3 images acquired by NASA’s Earth Polychromatic Imaging Camera.

== Eclipse timing ==
=== Places experiencing annular eclipse ===
Solar Eclipse of February 26, 2017 (Local Times)
Country or territory	City or place	Start of partial eclipse	Start of annular eclipse	Maximum eclipse	End of annular eclipse	End of partial eclipse	Duration of annularity (min:s)	Duration of eclipse (hr:min)	Maximum coverage
Chile	Coyhaique	09:23:18	10:35:42	10:36:11	10:36:41	11:56:23	0:59	2:33	97.35%
Argentina	Facundo	09:24:21	10:37:48	10:38:20	10:38:51	11:59:38	1:03	2:35	97.44%
Argentina	Camarones	09:27:00	10:42:50	10:43:16	10:43:42	12:06:45	0:52	2:40	97.61%
Angola	Huambo	16:19:54	17:28:18	17:28:27	17:28:37	18:21:02 (sunset)	0:19	2:01	96.51%

=== Places experiencing partial eclipse ===
Solar Eclipse of February 26, 2017 (Local Times)
Country or territory	City or place	Start of partial eclipse	Maximum eclipse	End of partial eclipse	Duration of eclipse (hr:min)	Maximum coverage
Chile	Santiago	09:19:35	10:31:31	11:52:39	2:33	55.32%
Chile	Punta Arenas	09:33:21	10:43:23	11:58:36	2:25	72.27%
Argentina	Buenos Aires	09:31:17	10:53:09	12:23:01	2:52	65.78%
Falkland Islands	Stanley	09:41:16	10:56:37	12:16:19	2:35	72.19%
Uruguay	Montevideo	09:33:55	10:57:32	12:28:32	2:55	68.57%
Paraguay	Asunción	09:41:31	10:58:05	12:22:10	2:41	34.12%
South Georgia and the South Sandwich Islands	King Edward Point	11:10:54	12:25:18	13:39:46	2:29	50.25%
Brazil	Rio de Janeiro	10:10:15	11:40:38	13:10:48	3:01	43.25%
Malawi	Lilongwe	17:27:24	18:07:26	18:09:41 (sunset)	0:42	55.31%
Lesotho	Maseru	17:10:44	18:08:40	18:45:53 (sunset)	1:35	45.26%
Saint Helena, Ascension and Tristan da Cunha	Jamestown	14:45:59	16:10:20	17:22:55	2:37	84.39%
Eswatini	Mbabane	17:15:29	18:12:52	18:28:52 (sunset)	1:13	50.66%
South Africa	Johannesburg	17:13:59	18:13:05	18:41:10 (sunset)	1:27	52.41%
Mozambique	Maputo	17:16:25	18:13:13	18:22:55 (sunset)	1:07	50.95%
Rwanda	Kigali	17:39:26	18:13:41	18:17:05 (sunset)	0:38	41.29%
Botswana	Gaborone	17:14:08	18:15:05	18:48:31 (sunset)	1:34	57.47%
Burundi	Gitega	17:37:42	18:16:18	18:18:29 (sunset)	0:41	49.64%
Namibia	Windhoek	17:09:02	18:16:20	19:16:13	2:07	68.83%
Burundi	Bujumbura	17:37:43	18:18:31	18:20:42 (sunset)	0:43	52.91%
Zimbabwe	Harare	17:23:09	18:20:49	18:23:07 (sunset)	1:00	73.54%
Namibia	Opuwo	17:11:13	18:21:26	19:23:20	2:12	84.48%
Zambia	Lusaka	17:24:30	18:26:09	18:32:35 (sunset)	1:08	82.77%
Democratic Republic of the Congo	Lubumbashi	17:28:05	18:30:02	18:33:21 (sunset)	1:05	94.96%
Angola	Luanda	16:23:21	17:32:08	18:28:33 (sunset)	2:05	82.13%
Democratic Republic of the Congo	Kinshasa	16:31:33	17:36:46	18:17:30 (sunset)	1:46	68.47%
Republic of the Congo	Brazzaville	16:31:37	17:36:49	18:17:34 (sunset)	1:46	68.25%
São Tomé and Príncipe	São Tomé	15:34:08	16:38:34	17:35:41	2:02	46.08%
Gabon	Libreville	16:35:58	17:39:27	18:35:52	2:02	48.17%
Cameroon	Yaoundé	16:43:40	17:42:15	18:27:46 (sunset)	1:44	38.43%
Central African Republic	Bangui	16:46:41	17:42:50	17:59:20 (sunset)	1:13	41.24%

== Gallery ==
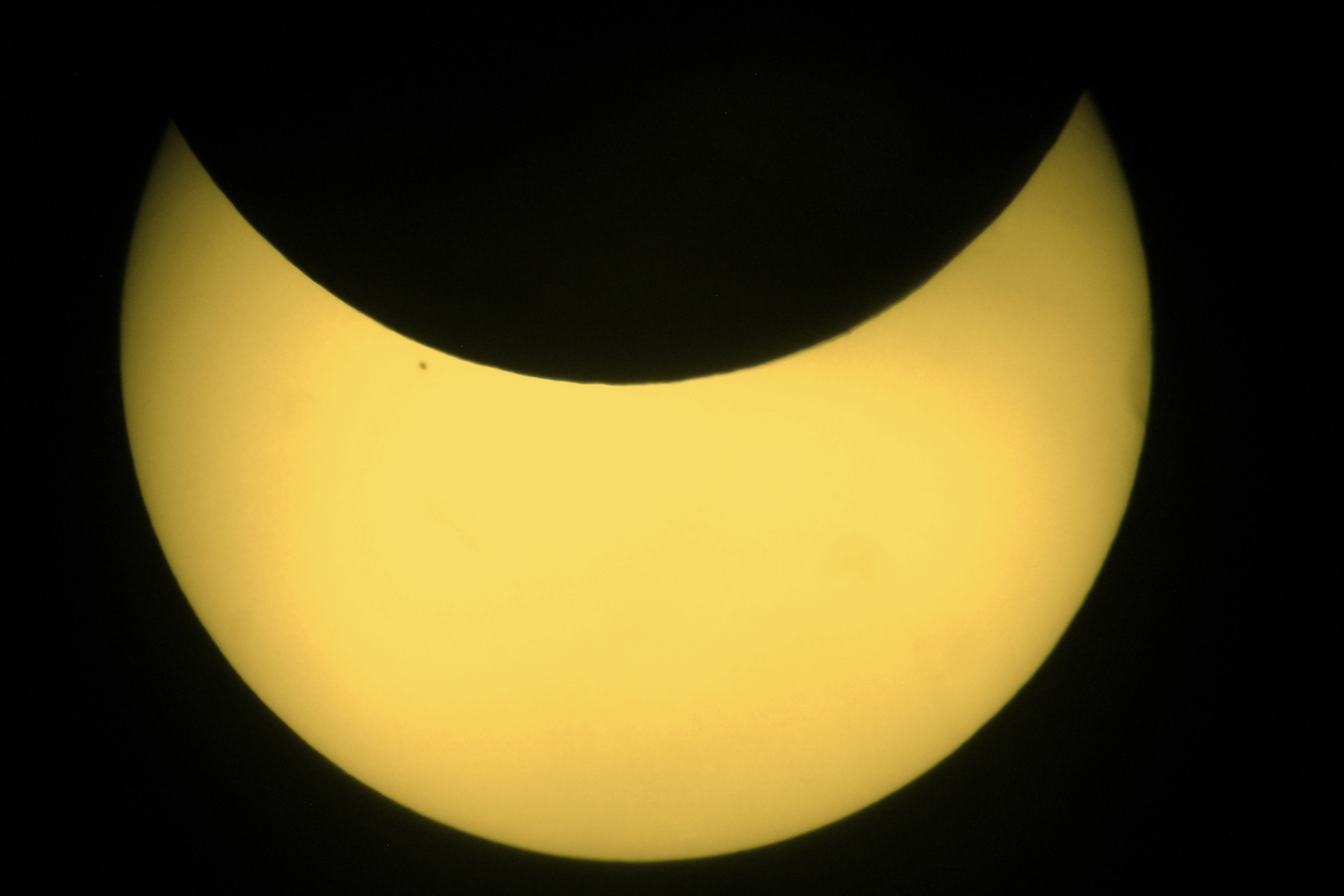
Partial from Villa Gesell, Argentina, 13:18 GMT

Coyhaique, Chile, 13:35 GMT, 1 minute before annularity

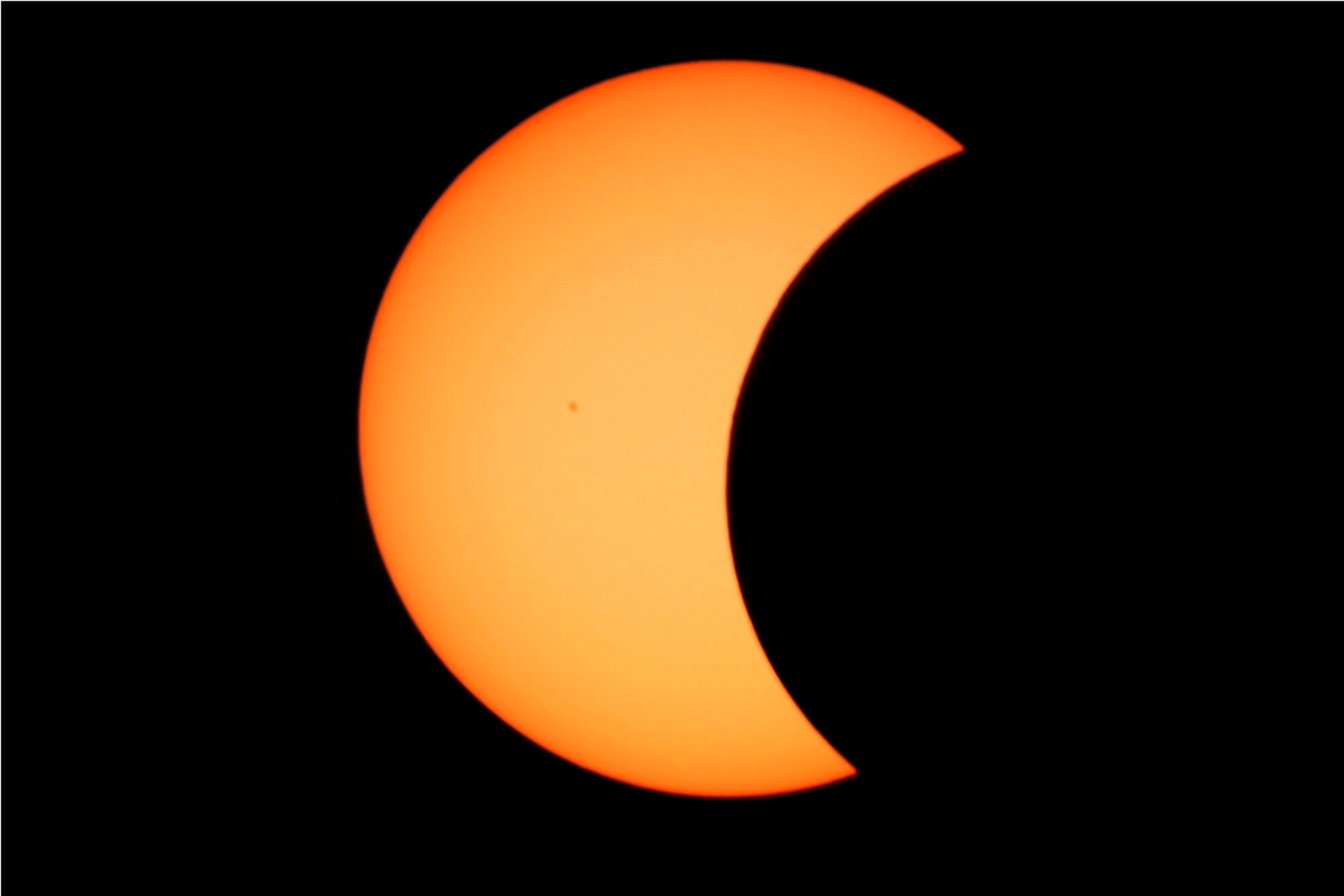
Partial from Pisco Elqui, Chile, 13:48 GMT

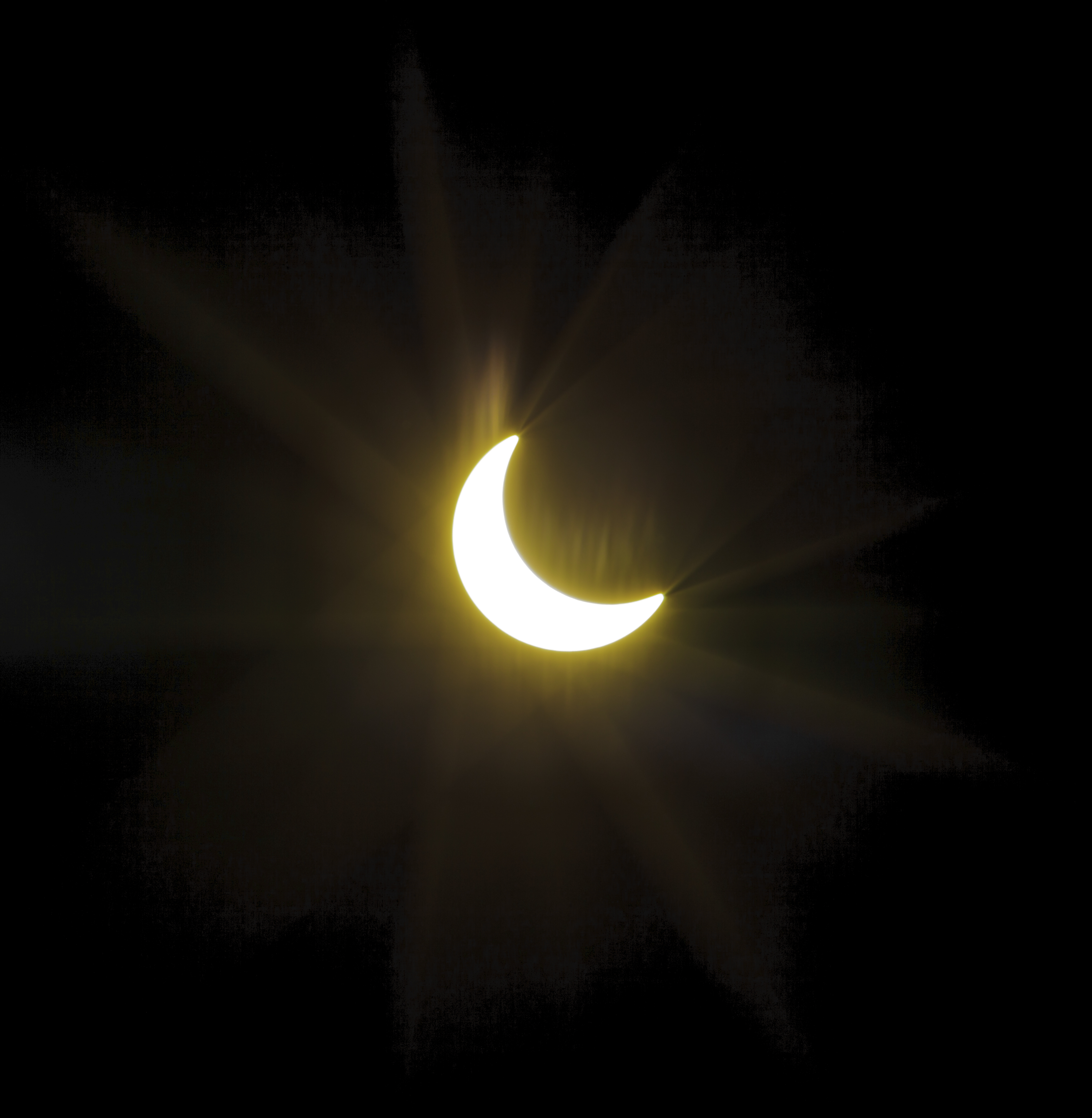
Partial from Punta del Este, Uruguay, 13:56 GMT

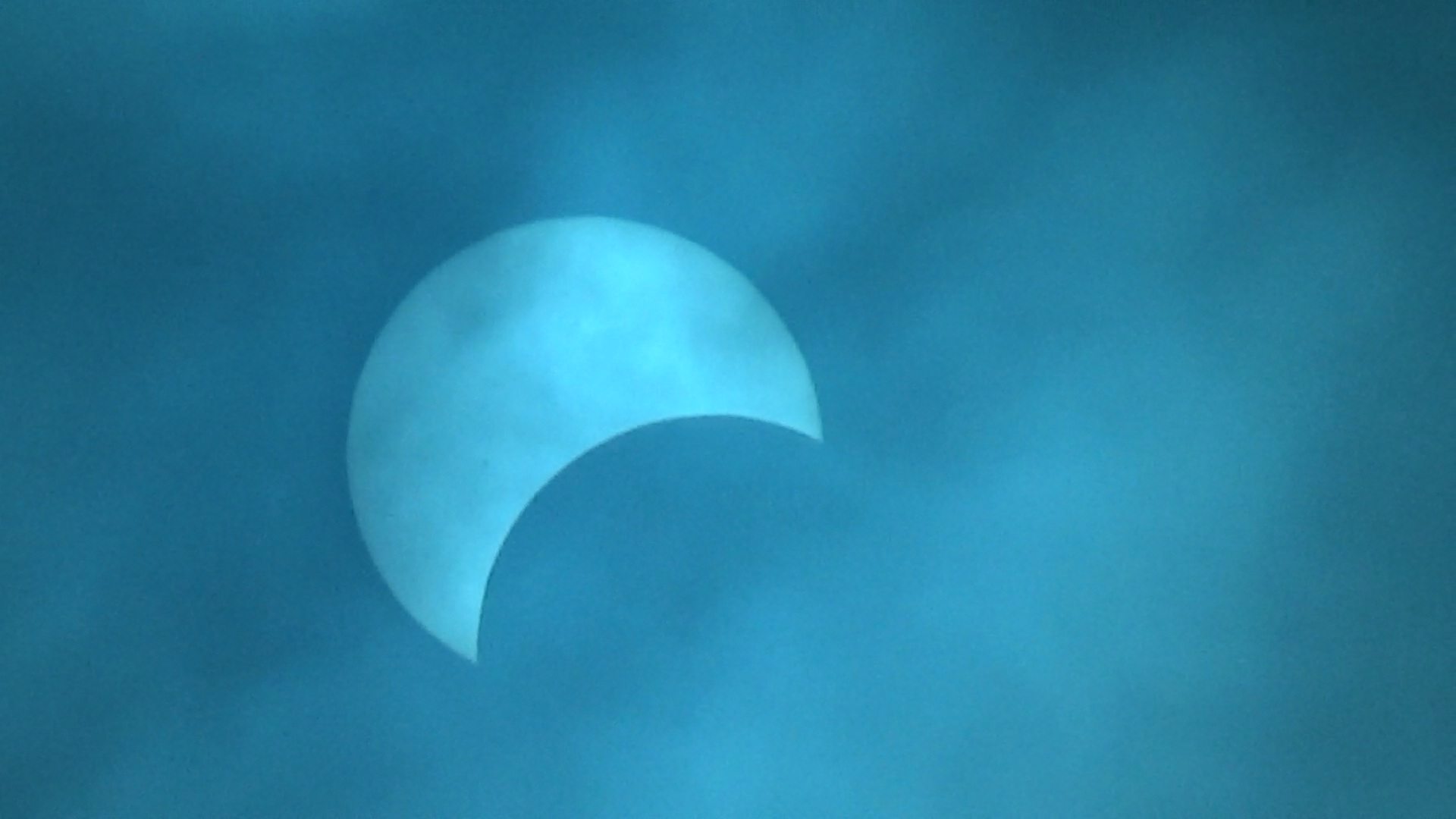
Partial from Puerto Cisnes, Chile, 14:17 GMT

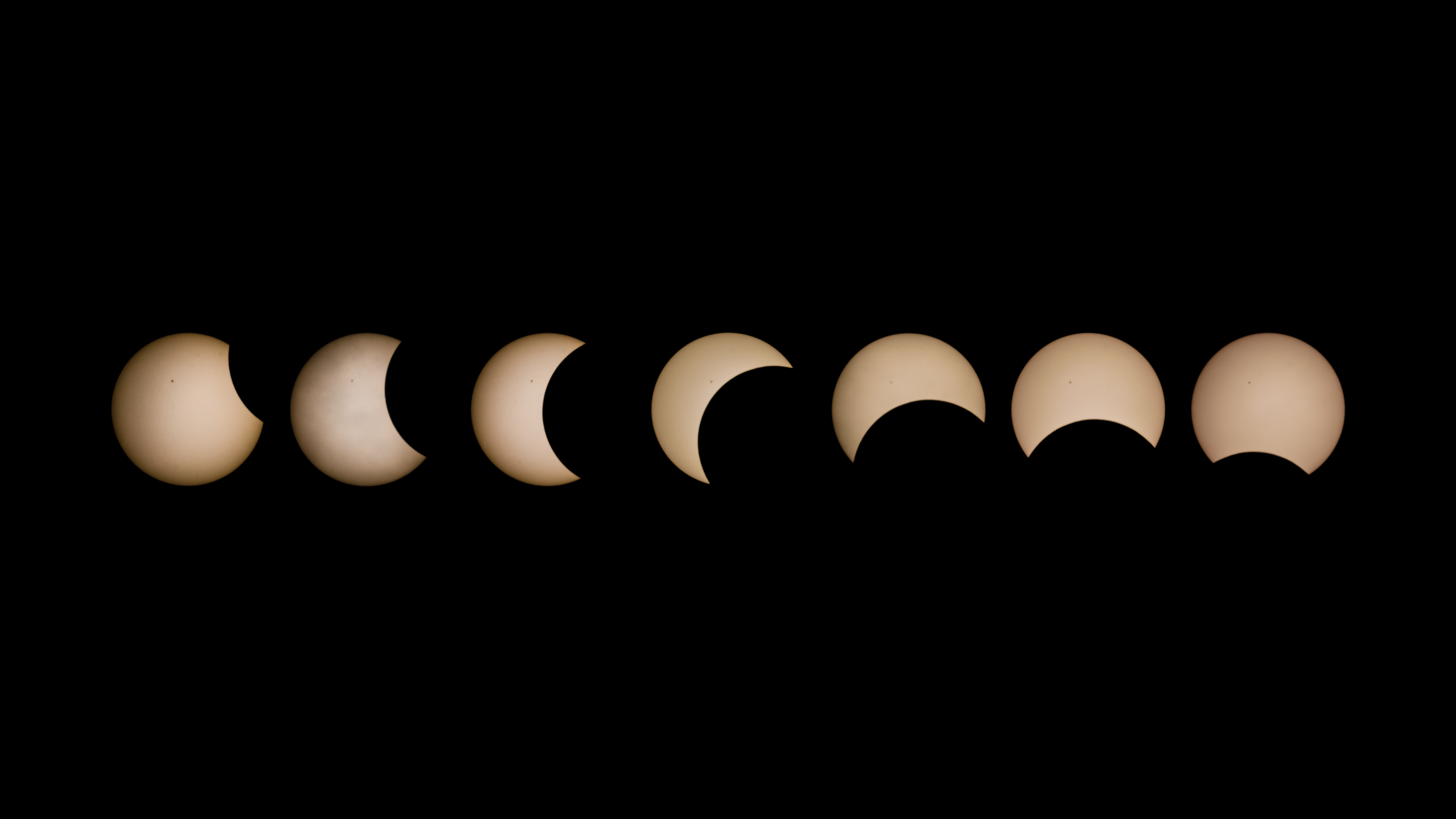
Composed image as seen from Paraná, Argentina

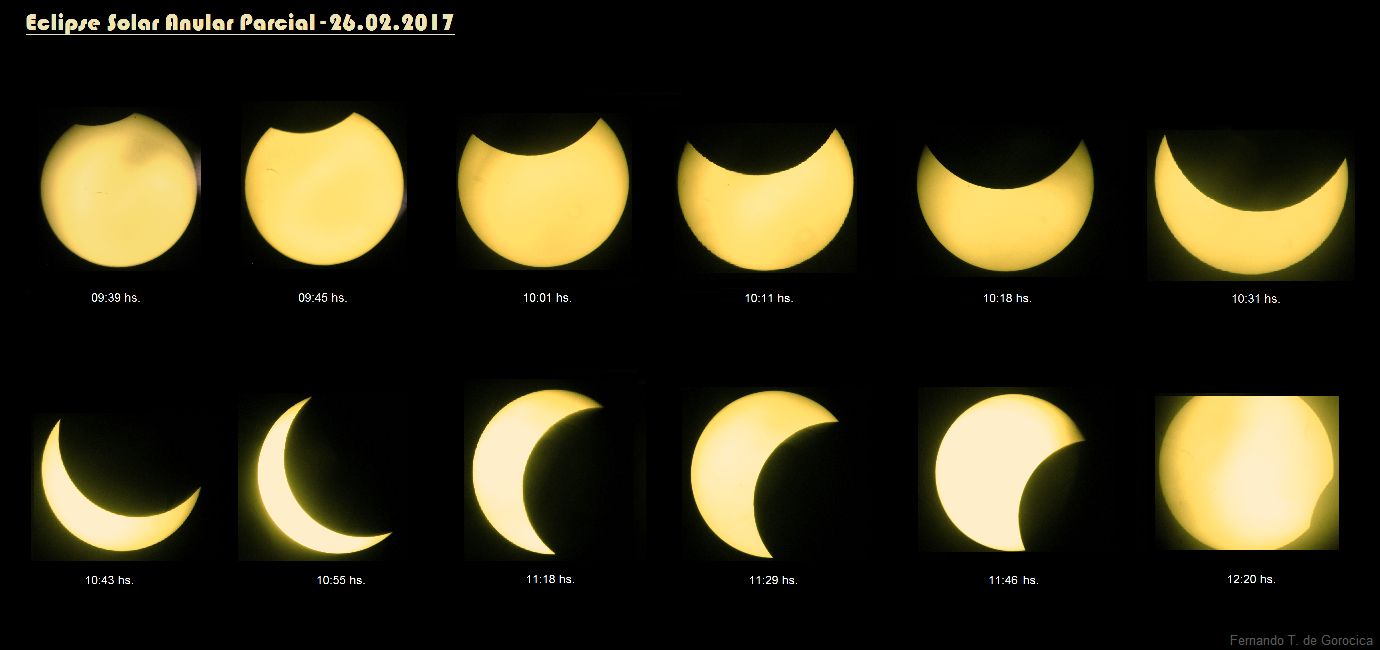
Time lapse images as seen from Villa Gesell, Argentina

Animation of the eclipse as seen from Montevideo, Uruguay

== Eclipse details ==
Shown below are two tables displaying details about this particular solar eclipse. The first table outlines times at which the Moon's penumbra or umbra attains the specific parameter, and the second table describes various other parameters pertaining to this eclipse.

February 26, 2017 Solar Eclipse Times
Event	Time (UTC)
First Penumbral External Contact	2017 February 26 at 12:11:56.1 UTC
First Umbral External Contact	2017 February 26 at 13:16:26.6 UTC
First Central Line	2017 February 26 at 13:17:14.6 UTC
Greatest Duration	2017 February 26 at 13:17:14.6 UTC
First Umbral Internal Contact	2017 February 26 at 13:18:02.7 UTC
Equatorial Conjunction	2017 February 26 at 14:39:54.4 UTC
Greatest Eclipse	2017 February 26 at 14:54:32.8 UTC
Ecliptic Conjunction	2017 February 26 at 14:59:31.7 UTC
Last Umbral Internal Contact	2017 February 26 at 16:31:16.0 UTC
Last Central Line	2017 February 26 at 16:32:01.1 UTC
Last Umbral External Contact	2017 February 26 at 16:32:46.1 UTC
Last Penumbral External Contact	2017 February 26 at 17:37:10.0 UTC

February 26, 2017 Solar Eclipse Parameters
Parameter	Value
Eclipse Magnitude	0.99223
Eclipse Obscuration	0.98451
Gamma	−0.45780
Sun Right Ascension	22h39m23.1s
Sun Declination	-08°29'38.8"
Sun Semi-Diameter	16'09.0"
Sun Equatorial Horizontal Parallax	08.9"
Moon Right Ascension	22h39m53.2s
Moon Declination	-08°55'03.6"
Moon Semi-Diameter	15'47.8"
Moon Equatorial Horizontal Parallax	0°57'58.6"
ΔT	68.6 s

== Eclipse season ==
This eclipse is part of an eclipse season, a period, roughly every six months, when eclipses occur. Only two (or occasionally three) eclipse seasons occur each year, and each season lasts about 35 days and repeats just short of six months (173 days) later; thus two full eclipse seasons always occur each year. Either two or three eclipses happen each eclipse season. In the sequence below, each eclipse is separated by a fortnight.

Eclipse season of February 2017
February 11 Ascending node (full moon)	February 26 Descending node (new moon)
Penumbral lunar eclipse Lunar Saros 114	Annular solar eclipse Solar Saros 140

== Related eclipses ==
=== Eclipses in 2017 ===
- A penumbral lunar eclipse on February 11.
- An annular solar eclipse on February 26.
- A partial lunar eclipse on August 7.
- A total solar eclipse on August 21.

=== Metonic ===
- Preceded by: Solar eclipse of May 10, 2013
- Followed by: Solar eclipse of December 14, 2020

=== Tzolkinex ===
- Preceded by: Solar eclipse of January 15, 2010
- Followed by: Solar eclipse of April 8, 2024

=== Half-Saros ===
- Preceded by: Lunar eclipse of February 21, 2008
- Followed by: Lunar eclipse of March 3, 2026

=== Tritos ===
- Preceded by: Solar eclipse of March 29, 2006
- Followed by: Solar eclipse of January 26, 2028

=== Solar Saros 140 ===
- Preceded by: Solar eclipse of February 16, 1999
- Followed by: Solar eclipse of March 9, 2035

=== Inex ===
- Preceded by: Solar eclipse of March 18, 1988
- Followed by: Solar eclipse of February 5, 2046

=== Triad ===
- Preceded by: Solar eclipse of April 28, 1930
- Followed by: Solar eclipse of December 29, 2103

=== Solar eclipses of 2015–2018 ===
This eclipse is a member of a semester series. An eclipse in a semester series of solar eclipses repeats approximately every 177 days and 4 hours (a semester) at alternating nodes of the Moon's orbit.

The partial solar eclipse on July 13, 2018 occurs in the next lunar year eclipse set.

Solar eclipse series sets from 2015 to 2018
Descending node			Ascending node		
Saros	Map	Gamma	Saros	Map	Gamma
120 Totality in Longyearbyen, Svalbard	March 20, 2015 Total	0.94536	125 Solar Dynamics Observatory	September 13, 2015 Partial	−1.10039
130 Balikpapan, Indonesia	March 9, 2016 Total	0.26092	135 Annularity in L'Étang-Salé, Réunion	September 1, 2016 Annular	−0.33301
140 Partial from Buenos Aires, Argentina	February 26, 2017 Annular	−0.45780	145 Totality in Madras, OR, USA	August 21, 2017 Total	0.43671
150 Partial in Olivos, Buenos Aires, Argentina	February 15, 2018 Partial	−1.21163	155 Partial in Huittinen, Finland	August 11, 2018 Partial	1.14758

=== Saros 140 ===
This eclipse is a part of Saros series 140, repeating every 18 years, 11 days, and containing 71 events. The series started with a partial solar eclipse on April 16, 1512. It contains total eclipses from July 21, 1656 through November 9, 1836; hybrid eclipses from November 20, 1854 through December 23, 1908; and annular eclipses from January 3, 1927 through December 7, 2485. The series ends at member 71 as a partial eclipse on June 1, 2774. Its eclipses are tabulated in three columns; every third eclipse in the same column is one exeligmos apart, so they all cast shadows over approximately the same parts of the Earth.

The longest duration of totality was produced by member 11 at 4 minutes, 10 seconds on August 12, 1692, and the longest duration of annularity will be produced by member 53 at 7 minutes, 35 seconds on November 15, 2449. All eclipses in this series occur at the Moon’s descending node of orbit.

Series members 18–39 occur between 1801 and 2200:
18	19	20
October 29, 1818	November 9, 1836	November 20, 1854
21	22	23
November 30, 1872	December 12, 1890	December 23, 1908
24	25	26
January 3, 1927	January 14, 1945	January 25, 1963
27	28	29
February 4, 1981	February 16, 1999	February 26, 2017
30	31	32
March 9, 2035	March 20, 2053	March 31, 2071
33	34	35
April 10, 2089	April 23, 2107	May 3, 2125
36	37	38
May 14, 2143	May 25, 2161	June 5, 2179
39
June 15, 2197

=== Metonic series ===
The metonic series repeats eclipses every 19 years (6939.69 days), lasting about 5 cycles. Eclipses occur in nearly the same calendar date. In addition, the octon subseries repeats 1/5 of that or every 3.8 years (1387.94 days). All eclipses in this table occur at the Moon's descending node.

21 eclipse events between July 22, 1971 and July 22, 2047
July 22	May 9–11	February 26–27	December 14–15	October 2–3
116	118	120	122	124
July 22, 1971	May 11, 1975	February 26, 1979	December 15, 1982	October 3, 1986
126	128	130	132	134
July 22, 1990	May 10, 1994	February 26, 1998	December 14, 2001	October 3, 2005
136	138	140	142	144
July 22, 2009	May 10, 2013	February 26, 2017	December 14, 2020	October 2, 2024
146	148	150	152	154
July 22, 2028	May 9, 2032	February 27, 2036	December 15, 2039	October 3, 2043
156
July 22, 2047

=== Tritos series ===
This eclipse is a part of a tritos cycle, repeating at alternating nodes every 135 synodic months (≈ 3986.63 days, or 11 years minus 1 month). Their appearance and longitude are irregular due to a lack of synchronization with the anomalistic month (period of perigee), but groupings of 3 tritos cycles (≈ 33 years minus 3 months) come close (≈ 434.044 anomalistic months), so eclipses are similar in these groupings.

Series members between 1801 and 2200
October 9, 1809 (Saros 121)	September 7, 1820 (Saros 122)	August 7, 1831 (Saros 123)	July 8, 1842 (Saros 124)	June 6, 1853 (Saros 125)
May 6, 1864 (Saros 126)	April 6, 1875 (Saros 127)	March 5, 1886 (Saros 128)	February 1, 1897 (Saros 129)	January 3, 1908 (Saros 130)
December 3, 1918 (Saros 131)	November 1, 1929 (Saros 132)	October 1, 1940 (Saros 133)	September 1, 1951 (Saros 134)	July 31, 1962 (Saros 135)
June 30, 1973 (Saros 136)	May 30, 1984 (Saros 137)	April 29, 1995 (Saros 138)	March 29, 2006 (Saros 139)	February 26, 2017 (Saros 140)
January 26, 2028 (Saros 141)	December 26, 2038 (Saros 142)	November 25, 2049 (Saros 143)	October 24, 2060 (Saros 144)	September 23, 2071 (Saros 145)
August 24, 2082 (Saros 146)	July 23, 2093 (Saros 147)	June 22, 2104 (Saros 148)	May 24, 2115 (Saros 149)	April 22, 2126 (Saros 150)
March 21, 2137 (Saros 151)	February 19, 2148 (Saros 152)	January 19, 2159 (Saros 153)	December 18, 2169 (Saros 154)	November 17, 2180 (Saros 155)
October 18, 2191 (Saros 156)

=== Inex series ===
This eclipse is a part of the long period inex cycle, repeating at alternating nodes, every 358 synodic months (≈ 10,571.95 days, or 29 years minus 20 days). Their appearance and longitude are irregular due to a lack of synchronization with the anomalistic month (period of perigee). However, groupings of 3 inex cycles (≈ 87 years minus 2 months) comes close (≈ 1,151.02 anomalistic months), so eclipses are similar in these groupings.

Series members between 1801 and 2200
July 17, 1814 (Saros 133)	June 27, 1843 (Saros 134)	June 6, 1872 (Saros 135)
May 18, 1901 (Saros 136)	April 28, 1930 (Saros 137)	April 8, 1959 (Saros 138)
March 18, 1988 (Saros 139)	February 26, 2017 (Saros 140)	February 5, 2046 (Saros 141)
January 16, 2075 (Saros 142)	December 29, 2103 (Saros 143)	December 7, 2132 (Saros 144)
November 17, 2161 (Saros 145)	October 29, 2190 (Saros 146)	

== Notes and references ==
=== References ===
- www.solar-eclipse.de - The annular solar eclipse of 02/26/2017
- NASA graphics
  - Interactive map of the eclipse from NASA
  - NASA Besselian Elements - Annular Solar Eclipse of 2017 February 26
- hermet.org: Annular Solar Eclipse: February 26 2017
