= Solar eclipse of February 5, 2046 =

Future annular solar eclipse

- Annular eclipse
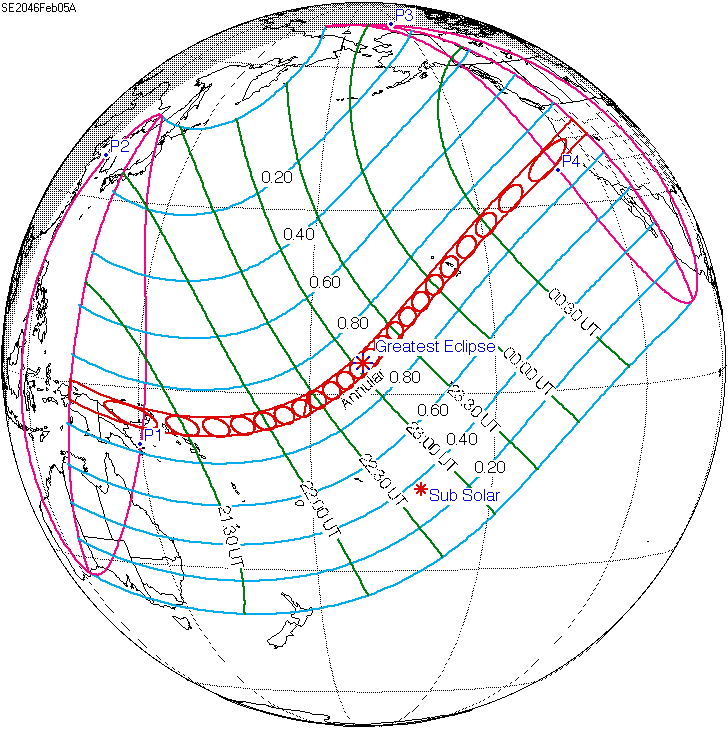
- Map
- Gamma: 0.3765
- Magnitude: 0.9232

Maximum eclipse
- Duration: 582 s (9 min 42 s)
- Coordinates: 4.8°N 171.4°W
- Max. width of band: 310 km (190 mi)

Times (UTC)
- Greatest eclipse: 23:06:26

References
- Saros: 141 (25 of 70)
- Catalog # (SE5000): 9609

An annular solar eclipse will occur at the Moon's ascending node of orbit between Monday, February 5 and Tuesday, February 6, 2046, with a magnitude of 0.9232. A solar eclipse occurs when the Moon passes between Earth and the Sun, thereby totally or partly obscuring the image of the Sun for a viewer on Earth. An annular solar eclipse occurs when the Moon's apparent diameter is smaller than the Sun's, blocking most of the Sun's light and causing the Sun to look like an annulus (ring). An annular eclipse appears as a partial eclipse over a region of the Earth thousands of kilometres wide. Occurring about 2.25 days before apogee (on February 8, 2046, at 5:10 UTC), the Moon's apparent diameter will be smaller.

The path of annularity will be visible from parts of eastern Indonesia (specifically Western New Guinea), Papua New Guinea, the Solomon Islands, Kiribati, Hawaii, and California, Oregon, Nevada, and Idaho in the United States. A partial solar eclipse will also be visible for parts of Indonesia, the Philippines, Japan, Australia, Oceania, and western North America.

== Images ==
Animated path

== Eclipse timing ==
=== Places experiencing annular eclipse ===
Solar Eclipse of February 5, 2046 (Local Times)
Country or territory	City or place	Start of partial eclipse	Start of annular eclipse	Maximum eclipse	End of annular eclipse	End of partial eclipse	Duration of annularity (min:s)	Duration of eclipse (hr:min)	Maximum coverage
Indonesia	Jayapura (Note: The times listed for this location occur on February 6, 2046, local time.)	05:44:47 (sunrise)	06:13:07	06:16:29	06:19:50	07:39:47	6:43	1:55	83.27%
Indonesia	Manokwari	06:13:15 (sunrise)	06:13:17	06:17:16	06:18:47	07:33:01	5:30	1:20	82.96%
Papua New Guinea	Rabaul	06:05:37	07:20:52	07:23:50	07:26:48	08:59:38	5:56	2:54	83.85%
Papua New Guinea	Buka	07:05:38	08:21:58	08:25:49	08:29:43	10:04:18	7:45	2:59	83.99%
Papua New Guinea	Arawa	07:05:33	08:22:52	08:26:23	08:29:54	10:05:35	7:02	3:00	84.04%
United States Minor Outlying Islands	Baker Island	08:45:16	10:35:16	10:39:59	10:44:42	12:40:02	9:26	3:55	85.32%
United States Minor Outlying Islands	Howland Island	08:46:00	10:36:10	10:40:58	10:45:45	12:41:07	9:35	3:55	85.31%
United States	Kailua-Kona	12:20:24	14:08:20	14:11:16	14:14:12	15:47:19	5:52	3:27	84.85%
United States	Nāpili-Honokōwai	12:21:23	14:07:54	14:12:02	14:16:09	15:48:04	8:15	3:27	84.82%
United States	Wailuku	12:21:38	14:07:58	14:12:13	14:16:27	15:48:09	8:29	3:27	84.82%
United States	Medford	15:35:02	16:50:57	16:53:48	16:56:40	17:31:18 (sunset)	5:43	1:56	83.12%
United States	Eureka	15:34:08	16:50:26	16:53:55	16:57:23	17:39:29 (sunset)	6:57	2:05	83.19%
United States	Arcata	15:34:12	16:50:26	16:53:55	16:57:24	17:39:02 (sunset)	6:58	2:05	83.19%
United States	Yreka	15:35:20	16:50:42	16:54:07	16:57:31	17:31:33 (sunset)	6:49	1:56	83.13%
United States	Hayfork	15:35:03	16:51:09	16:54:20	16:57:32	17:36:02 (sunset)	6:23	2:01	83.17%
United States	Fort Bragg	15:34:39	16:52:57	16:54:25	16:55:56	17:40:36 (sunset)	2:59	2:06	83.21%
United States	Redding	15:35:44	16:51:40	16:54:35	16:57:30	17:32:48 (sunset)	5:50	1:57	83.14%
United States	Cottonwood	15:35:52	16:52:09	16:54:41	16:57:14	17:32:44 (sunset)	5:05	1:57	83.14%
United States	Burney	15:36:18	16:51:46	16:54:43	16:57:40	17:29:19 (sunset)	5:54	1:53	83.11%
United States	Susanville	15:37:16	16:54:35	16:55:09	16:55:46	17:26:10 (sunset)	1:11	1:49	83.08%
United States	Ontario	16:38:51	17:51:24	17:54:28	17:57:32	18:04:05 (sunset)	6:08	1:25	82.91%
United States	Nampa	16:39:16	17:51:24	17:54:46	17:58:07	18:03:26 (sunset)	6:43	1:24	82.90%
United States	Boise	16:39:28	17:51:26	17:54:48	17:58:10	18:01:55 (sunset)	6:44	1:22	82.89%
United States	Gooding	16:40:40	17:52:38	17:53:03	17:57:22	17:57:22 (sunset)	4:44	1:17	82.87%

=== Places experiencing partial eclipse ===
Solar Eclipse of February 5, 2046 (Local Times)
Country or territory	City or place	Start of partial eclipse	Maximum eclipse	End of partial eclipse	Duration of eclipse (hr:min)	Maximum coverage
Australia	Darwin	06:42:48 (sunrise)	06:45:07	07:50:20	1:08	50.94%
Papua New Guinea	Port Moresby	06:10:57 (sunrise)	07:16:55	08:44:00	2:33	73.95%
Australia	Brisbane	06:21:52	07:19:33	08:24:15	2:02	20.84%
Palau	Ngerulmud	06:20:25 (sunrise)	06:22:42	07:38:31	1:18	62.82%
Solomon Islands	Honiara	07:06:23	08:30:08	10:12:27	3:06	79.06%
New Caledonia	Nouméa	07:16:55	08:32:59	10:00:45	2:44	37.45%
Guam	Hagåtña	06:46:47 (sunrise)	07:33:54	08:54:59	2:08	39.59%
Indonesia	Ambon	06:33:36 (sunrise)	06:35:53	07:26:09	0:53	52.55%
Vanuatu	Port Vila	07:13:48	08:37:51	10:16:30	3:03	51.44%
Timor-Leste	Dili	06:38:27 (sunrise)	06:40:45	07:20:27	0:42	35.87%
Federated States of Micronesia	Palikir	07:21:15	08:44:02	10:26:11	3:05	52.71%
Indonesia	Ternate	06:41:49 (sunrise)	06:44:59	07:28:51	0:47	44.34%
Nauru	Yaren	08:17:49	09:52:20	11:47:36	3:30	75.70%
Fiji	Suva	08:26:03	09:56:02	11:37:00	3:11	44.36%
Tonga	Nuku'alofa	09:40:42	11:05:20	12:36:18	2:56	29.31%
Tuvalu	Funafuti	08:26:59	10:10:52	12:07:18	3:40	72.76%
Kiribati	Tarawa	08:28:17	10:11:25	12:11:46	3:43	74.35%
Wallis and Futuna	Mata Utu	08:34:13	10:14:19	12:02:44	3:29	52.52%
Marshall Islands	Majuro	08:36:39	10:17:31	12:14:56	3:38	57.68%
Samoa	Apia	09:44:14	11:23:40	13:07:44	3:24	44.30%
American Samoa	Pago Pago	09:47:00	11:25:19	13:07:29	3:20	41.36%
Tokelau	Fakaofo	09:46:49	11:33:37	13:23:36	3:37	55.29%
Kiribati	Kiritimati	11:43:22	13:32:57	15:11:31	3:28	50.29%
United States Minor Outlying Islands	Midway Atoll	10:59:12	12:36:42	14:10:14	3:11	31.92%
United States	Honolulu	12:19:14	14:10:25	15:47:10	3:28	84.81%
Canada	Calgary	16:37:45	17:31:16	17:35:06 (sunset)	0:57	54.17%
Canada	Vancouver	15:33:56	16:49:48	17:16:13 (sunset)	1:42	66.80%
United States	Los Angeles	15:41:43	16:57:02	17:27:40 (sunset)	1:46	62.88%
Mexico	Tijuana	15:43:45	16:57:23	17:25:12 (sunset)	1:41	56.88%
Mexico	Hermosillo	16:52:23	17:58:25	18:06:01 (sunset)	1:14	40.59%

== Eclipse details ==
Shown below are two tables displaying details about this particular solar eclipse. The first table outlines times at which the Moon's penumbra or umbra attains the specific parameter, and the second table describes various other parameters pertaining to this eclipse.

February 5, 2046 Solar Eclipse Times
Event	Time (UTC)
First Penumbral External Contact	2046 February 5 at 20:05:17.8 UTC
First Umbral External Contact	2046 February 5 at 21:13:07.7 UTC
First Central Line	2046 February 5 at 21:16:34.4 UTC
First Umbral Internal Contact	2046 February 5 at 21:20:02.1 UTC
First Penumbral Internal Contact	2046 February 5 at 22:42:57.6 UTC
Greatest Duration	2046 February 5 at 22:50:22.5 UTC
Greatest Eclipse	2046 February 5 at 23:06:26.2 UTC
Ecliptic Conjunction	2046 February 5 at 23:10:57.3 UTC
Equatorial Conjunction	2046 February 5 at 23:25:48.6 UTC
Last Penumbral Internal Contact	2046 February 5 at 23:29:25.4 UTC
Last Umbral Internal Contact	2046 February 6 at 00:52:36.8 UTC
Last Central Line	2046 February 6 at 00:56:06.1 UTC
Last Umbral External Contact	2046 February 6 at 00:59:34.4 UTC
Last Penumbral External Contact	2046 February 6 at 02:07:29.5 UTC

February 5, 2046 Solar Eclipse Parameters
Parameter	Value
Eclipse Magnitude	0.92321
Eclipse Obscuration	0.85231
Gamma	0.37654
Sun Right Ascension	21h19m00.8s
Sun Declination	-15°38'42.4"
Sun Semi-Diameter	16'13.2"
Sun Equatorial Horizontal Parallax	08.9"
Moon Right Ascension	21h18m27.2s
Moon Declination	-15°20'02.1"
Moon Semi-Diameter	14'46.0"
Moon Equatorial Horizontal Parallax	0°54'11.7"
ΔT	81.8 s

== Eclipse season ==
This eclipse is part of an eclipse season, a period, roughly every six months, when eclipses occur. Only two (or occasionally three) eclipse seasons occur each year, and each season lasts about 35 days and repeats just short of six months (173 days) later; thus two full eclipse seasons always occur each year. Either two or three eclipses happen each eclipse season. In the sequence below, each eclipse is separated by a fortnight.

Eclipse season of January–February 2046
January 22 Descending node (full moon)	February 5 Ascending node (new moon)
Partial lunar eclipse Lunar Saros 115	Annular solar eclipse Solar Saros 141

== Related eclipses ==
=== Eclipses in 2046 ===
- A partial lunar eclipse on January 22.
- An annular solar eclipse on February 5.
- A partial lunar eclipse on July 18.
- A total solar eclipse on August 2.

=== Metonic ===
- Preceded by: Solar eclipse of April 20, 2042
- Followed by: Solar eclipse of November 25, 2049

=== Tzolkinex ===
- Preceded by: Solar eclipse of December 26, 2038
- Followed by: Solar eclipse of March 20, 2053

=== Half-Saros ===
- Preceded by: Lunar eclipse of January 31, 2037
- Followed by: Lunar eclipse of February 11, 2055

=== Tritos ===
- Preceded by: Solar eclipse of March 9, 2035
- Followed by: Solar eclipse of January 5, 2057

=== Solar Saros 141 ===
- Preceded by: Solar eclipse of January 26, 2028
- Followed by: Solar eclipse of February 17, 2064

=== Inex ===
- Preceded by: Solar eclipse of February 26, 2017
- Followed by: Solar eclipse of January 16, 2075

=== Triad ===
- Preceded by: Solar eclipse of April 8, 1959
- Followed by: Solar eclipse of December 7, 2132

=== Solar eclipses of 2044–2047 ===
This eclipse is a member of a semester series. An eclipse in a semester series of solar eclipses repeats approximately every 177 days and 4 hours (a semester) at alternating nodes of the Moon's orbit.

The partial solar eclipses on June 23, 2047 and December 16, 2047 occur in the next lunar year eclipse set.

Solar eclipse series sets from 2044 to 2047
Ascending node			Descending node		
Saros	Map	Gamma	Saros	Map	Gamma
121	February 28, 2044 Annular	−0.9954	126	August 23, 2044 Total	0.9613
131	February 16, 2045 Annular	−0.3125	136	August 12, 2045 Total	0.2116
141	February 5, 2046 Annular	0.3765	146	August 2, 2046 Total	−0.535
151	January 26, 2047 Partial	1.045	156	July 22, 2047 Partial	−1.3477

=== Saros 141 ===
This eclipse is a part of Saros series 141, repeating every 18 years, 11 days, and containing 70 events. The series started with a partial solar eclipse on May 19, 1613. It contains annular eclipses from August 4, 1739 through October 14, 2640. There are no hybrid or total eclipses in this set. The series ends at member 70 as a partial eclipse on June 13, 2857. Its eclipses are tabulated in three columns; every third eclipse in the same column is one exeligmos apart, so they all cast shadows over approximately the same parts of the Earth.

The longest duration of annularity was produced by member 20 at 12 minutes, 9 seconds on December 14, 1955. All eclipses in this series occur at the Moon’s ascending node of orbit.

Series members 12–33 occur between 1801 and 2200:
12	13	14
September 17, 1811	September 28, 1829	October 9, 1847
15	16	17
October 19, 1865	October 30, 1883	November 11, 1901
18	19	20
November 22, 1919	December 2, 1937	December 14, 1955
21	22	23
December 24, 1973	January 4, 1992	January 15, 2010
24	25	26
January 26, 2028	February 5, 2046	February 17, 2064
27	28	29
February 27, 2082	March 10, 2100	March 22, 2118
30	31	32
April 1, 2136	April 12, 2154	April 23, 2172
33
May 4, 2190

=== Metonic series ===
The metonic series repeats eclipses every 19 years (6939.69 days), lasting about 5 cycles. Eclipses occur in nearly the same calendar date. In addition, the octon subseries repeats 1/5 of that or every 3.8 years (1387.94 days). All eclipses in this table occur at the Moon's ascending node.

21 eclipse events between July 1, 2000 and July 1, 2076
July 1–2	April 19–20	February 5–7	November 24–25	September 12–13
117	119	121	123	125
July 1, 2000	April 19, 2004	February 7, 2008	November 25, 2011	September 13, 2015
127	129	131	133	135
July 2, 2019	April 20, 2023	February 6, 2027	November 25, 2030	September 12, 2034
137	139	141	143	145
July 2, 2038	April 20, 2042	February 5, 2046	November 25, 2049	September 12, 2053
147	149	151	153	155
July 1, 2057	April 20, 2061	February 5, 2065	November 24, 2068	September 12, 2072
157
July 1, 2076

=== Tritos series ===
This eclipse is a part of a tritos cycle, repeating at alternating nodes every 135 synodic months (≈ 3986.63 days, or 11 years minus 1 month). Their appearance and longitude are irregular due to a lack of synchronization with the anomalistic month (period of perigee), but groupings of 3 tritos cycles (≈ 33 years minus 3 months) come close (≈ 434.044 anomalistic months), so eclipses are similar in these groupings.

Series members between 1801 and 2200
December 21, 1805 (Saros 119)	November 19, 1816 (Saros 120)	October 20, 1827 (Saros 121)	September 18, 1838 (Saros 122)	August 18, 1849 (Saros 123)
July 18, 1860 (Saros 124)	June 18, 1871 (Saros 125)	May 17, 1882 (Saros 126)	April 16, 1893 (Saros 127)	March 17, 1904 (Saros 128)
February 14, 1915 (Saros 129)	January 14, 1926 (Saros 130)	December 13, 1936 (Saros 131)	November 12, 1947 (Saros 132)	October 12, 1958 (Saros 133)
September 11, 1969 (Saros 134)	August 10, 1980 (Saros 135)	July 11, 1991 (Saros 136)	June 10, 2002 (Saros 137)	May 10, 2013 (Saros 138)
April 8, 2024 (Saros 139)	March 9, 2035 (Saros 140)	February 5, 2046 (Saros 141)	January 5, 2057 (Saros 142)	December 6, 2067 (Saros 143)
November 4, 2078 (Saros 144)	October 4, 2089 (Saros 145)	September 4, 2100 (Saros 146)	August 4, 2111 (Saros 147)	July 4, 2122 (Saros 148)
June 3, 2133 (Saros 149)	May 3, 2144 (Saros 150)	April 2, 2155 (Saros 151)	March 2, 2166 (Saros 152)	January 29, 2177 (Saros 153)
December 29, 2187 (Saros 154)	November 28, 2198 (Saros 155)			

=== Inex series ===
This eclipse is a part of the long period inex cycle, repeating at alternating nodes, every 358 synodic months (≈ 10,571.95 days, or 29 years minus 20 days). Their appearance and longitude are irregular due to a lack of synchronization with the anomalistic month (period of perigee). However, groupings of 3 inex cycles (≈ 87 years minus 2 months) comes close (≈ 1,151.02 anomalistic months), so eclipses are similar in these groupings.

Series members between 1801 and 2200
July 17, 1814 (Saros 133)	June 27, 1843 (Saros 134)	June 6, 1872 (Saros 135)
May 18, 1901 (Saros 136)	April 28, 1930 (Saros 137)	April 8, 1959 (Saros 138)
March 18, 1988 (Saros 139)	February 26, 2017 (Saros 140)	February 5, 2046 (Saros 141)
January 16, 2075 (Saros 142)	December 29, 2103 (Saros 143)	December 7, 2132 (Saros 144)
November 17, 2161 (Saros 145)	October 29, 2190 (Saros 146)	
