= Solar eclipse of March 9, 2035 =

Future annular solar eclipse

- Annular eclipse
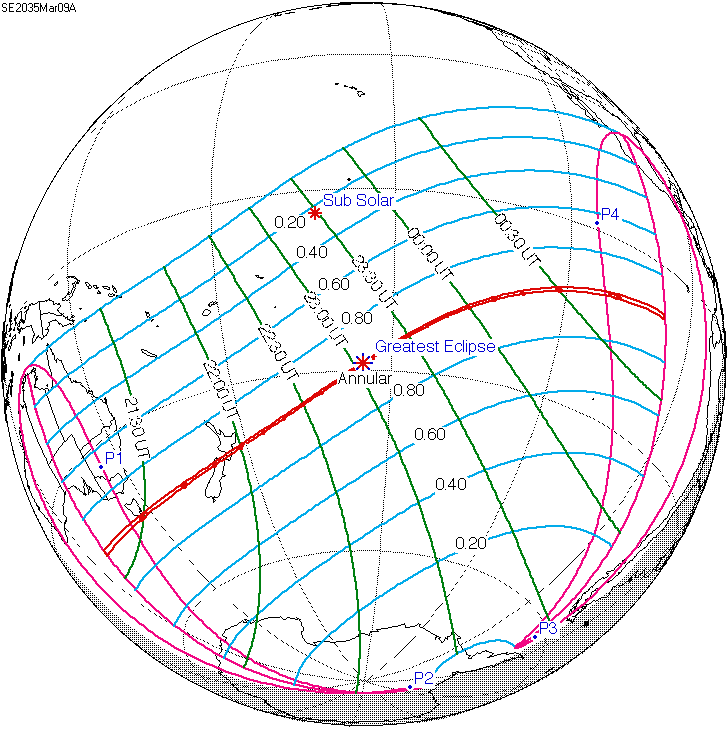
- Map
- Gamma: −0.4368
- Magnitude: 0.9919

Maximum eclipse
- Duration: 48 s (0 min 48 s)
- Coordinates: 29°S 154.9°W
- Max. width of band: 31 km (19 mi)

Times (UTC)
- Greatest eclipse: 23:05:54

References
- Saros: 140 (30 of 71)
- Catalog # (SE5000): 9585

An annular solar eclipse will occur at the Moon's descending node of orbit between Friday, March 9 and Saturday, March 10, 2035, with a magnitude of 0.9919. A solar eclipse occurs when the Moon passes between Earth and the Sun, thereby totally or partly obscuring the image of the Sun for a viewer on Earth. An annular solar eclipse occurs when the Moon's apparent diameter is smaller than the Sun's, blocking most of the Sun's light and causing the Sun to look like an annulus (ring). An annular eclipse appears as a partial eclipse over a region of the Earth thousands of kilometres wide. The Moon's apparent diameter will be near the average diameter because it will occur 7.6 days after apogee (on March 2, 2035, at 9:30 UTC) and 5.1 days before perigee (on March 15, 2035, at 1:40 UTC).

Annularity will be visible for parts of New Zealand and French Polynesia. A partial eclipse will be visible for parts of Australia, Oceania, Antarctica, and central Mexico.

== Images ==
Animated path

== Eclipse timing ==
=== Places experiencing total eclipse ===
Solar Eclipse of March 9, 2035 (Local Times)
Country or territory	City or place	Start of partial eclipse	Start of annular eclipse	Maximum eclipse	End of annular eclipse	End of partial eclipse	Duration of annularity (min:s)	Duration of eclipse (hr:min)	Maximum coverage
New Zealand	Richmond (Note: The times listed for this location occur on March 10, 2035, local time.)	09:34:43	10:51:55	10:52:27	10:52:59	12:18:01	1:04	2:43	97.50%
New Zealand	Nelson	09:34:45	10:52:03	10:52:34	10:53:06	12:18:13	1:03	2:43	97.51%
New Zealand	Paraparaumu	09:36:05	10:54:27	10:54:58	10:55:29	12:21:34	1:02	2:45	97.58%

=== Places experiencing partial eclipse ===
Solar Eclipse of March 9, 2035 (Local Times)
Country or territory	City or place	Start of partial eclipse	Maximum eclipse	End of partial eclipse	Duration of eclipse (hr:min)	Maximum coverage
Australia	Adelaide	07:09:53 (sunrise)	07:50:20	08:55:40	1:46	65.53%
Australia	Darwin	06:49:50 (sunrise)	06:52:02	07:03:45	0:14	1.19%
Australia	Brisbane	06:24:23	07:24:25	08:32:02	2:08	39.40%
Australia	Melbourne	07:21:40	08:24:26	09:34:15	2:13	75.65%
Australia	Canberra	07:21:16	08:24:58	09:36:17	2:15	66.65%
Australia	Sydney	07:21:30	08:25:33	09:37:28	2:16	61.73%
New Caledonia	Nouméa	07:37:59	08:41:30	09:53:13	2:15	27.07%
Norfolk Island	Kingston	08:30:46	09:43:05	11:04:56	2:34	50.62%
Vanuatu	Port Vila	07:50:11	08:46:49	09:49:59	2:00	15.11%
New Zealand	Auckland	09:34:24	10:54:08	12:22:29	2:48	83.84%
New Zealand	Wellington	09:36:05	10:54:42	12:20:59	2:45	97.49%
Antarctica	Dumont d'Urville Station	07:03:06	07:54:49	08:48:36	1:46	31.50%
Antarctica	Casey Station	06:00:30 (sunrise)	06:05:59	06:42:39	0:42	26.51%
Fiji	Suva	08:59:05	10:10:24	11:28:43	2:30	23.88%
Australia	Perth	06:12:20 (sunrise)	06:14:12	06:15:33	0:03	0.36%
Tonga	Nuku'alofa	10:00:08	11:24:10	12:54:14	2:54	40.53%
Tuvalu	Funafuti	09:43:57	10:24:35	11:07:11	1:23	2.79%
Wallis and Futuna	Mata Utu	09:21:46	10:31:53	11:45:58	2:24	16.79%
Niue	Alofi	10:12:55	11:41:37	13:13:05	3:00	41.82%
Samoa	Apia	10:25:26	11:44:27	13:05:51	2:40	23.86%
American Samoa	Pago Pago	10:25:25	11:46:56	13:10:24	2:45	26.61%
Tokelau	Fakaofo	10:44:43	11:53:58	13:04:06	2:19	13.52%
Cook Islands	Rarotonga	11:27:11	13:05:47	14:40:53	3:14	66.38%
French Polynesia	Papeete	11:57:59	13:37:40	15:07:16	3:09	74.24%
Kiribati	Kiritimati	12:55:42	13:54:00	14:48:22	1:53	8.25%
Pitcairn Islands	Adamstown	14:33:58	16:00:21	17:15:47	2:42	71.26%
Ecuador	Galápagos Islands	17:49:56	18:03:51	18:12:24 (sunset)	0:22	11.64%
Chile	Easter Island	18:11:16	19:17:45	20:17:03	2:06	47.67%
Mexico	Mexico City	18:23:43	18:42:10	18:44:28 (sunset)	0:21	5.02%
Clipperton Island	Clipperton Island	16:01:24	16:55:07	17:27:34 (sunset)	1:26	29.11%

== Eclipse details ==
Shown below are two tables displaying details about this particular solar eclipse. The first table outlines times at which the Moon's penumbra or umbra attains the specific parameter, and the second table describes various other parameters pertaining to this eclipse.

March 9, 2035 Solar Eclipse Times
Event	Time (UTC)
First Penumbral External Contact	2035 March 9 at 20:22:04.1 UTC
First Umbral External Contact	2035 March 9 at 21:26:19.2 UTC
First Central Line	2035 March 9 at 21:27:07.8 UTC
Greatest Duration	2035 March 9 at 21:27:07.8 UTC
First Umbral Internal Contact	2035 March 9 at 21:27:56.5 UTC
Equatorial Conjunction	2035 March 9 at 22:50:50.5 UTC
First Penumbral Internal Contact	2035 March 9 at 22:57:05.1 UTC
Greatest Eclipse	2035 March 9 at 23:05:53.6 UTC
Ecliptic Conjunction	2035 March 9 at 23:10:39.6 UTC
Last Penumbral Internal Contact	2035 March 9 at 23:15:08.3 UTC
Last Umbral Internal Contact	2035 March 10 at 00:44:04.1 UTC
Last Central Line	2035 March 10 at 00:44:49.7 UTC
Last Umbral External Contact	2035 March 10 at 00:45:35.2 UTC
Last Penumbral External Contact	2035 March 10 at 01:49:43.7 UTC

March 9, 2035 Solar Eclipse Parameters
Parameter	Value
Eclipse Magnitude	0.99191
Eclipse Obscuration	0.98388
Gamma	−0.43679
Sun Right Ascension	23h20m17.6s
Sun Declination	-04°16'22.2"
Sun Semi-Diameter	16'06.5"
Sun Equatorial Horizontal Parallax	08.9"
Moon Right Ascension	23h20m47.9s
Moon Declination	-04°40'23.8"
Moon Semi-Diameter	15'44.9"
Moon Equatorial Horizontal Parallax	0°57'47.9"
ΔT	76.2 s

== Eclipse season ==
This eclipse is part of an eclipse season, a period, roughly every six months, when eclipses occur. Only two (or occasionally three) eclipse seasons occur each year, and each season lasts about 35 days and repeats just short of six months (173 days) later; thus two full eclipse seasons always occur each year. Either two or three eclipses happen each eclipse season. In the sequence below, each eclipse is separated by a fortnight.

Eclipse season of February–March 2035
February 22 Ascending node (full moon)	March 9 Descending node (new moon)
Penumbral lunar eclipse Lunar Saros 114	Annular solar eclipse Solar Saros 140

== Related eclipses ==
=== Eclipses in 2035 ===
- A penumbral lunar eclipse on February 22.
- An annular solar eclipse on March 9.
- A partial lunar eclipse on August 19.
- A total solar eclipse on September 2.

=== Metonic ===
- Preceded by: Solar eclipse of May 21, 2031
- Followed by: Solar eclipse of December 26, 2038

=== Tzolkinex ===
- Preceded by: Solar eclipse of January 26, 2028
- Followed by: Solar eclipse of April 20, 2042

=== Half-Saros ===
- Preceded by: Lunar eclipse of March 3, 2026
- Followed by: Lunar eclipse of March 13, 2044

=== Tritos ===
- Preceded by: Solar eclipse of April 8, 2024
- Followed by: Solar eclipse of February 5, 2046

=== Solar Saros 140 ===
- Preceded by: Solar eclipse of February 26, 2017
- Followed by: Solar eclipse of March 20, 2053

=== Inex ===
- Preceded by: Solar eclipse of March 29, 2006
- Followed by: Solar eclipse of February 17, 2064

=== Triad ===
- Preceded by: Solar eclipse of May 9, 1948
- Followed by: Solar eclipse of January 8, 2122

=== Solar eclipses of 2033–2036 ===
This eclipse is a member of a semester series. An eclipse in a semester series of solar eclipses repeats approximately every 177 days and 4 hours (a semester) at alternating nodes of the Moon's orbit.

The partial solar eclipse on July 23, 2036 occurs in the next lunar year eclipse set.

Solar eclipse series sets from 2033 to 2036
Descending node			Ascending node		
Saros	Map	Gamma	Saros	Map	Gamma
120	March 30, 2033 Total	0.9778	125	September 23, 2033 Partial	−1.1583
130	March 20, 2034 Total	0.2894	135	September 12, 2034 Annular	−0.3936
140	March 9, 2035 Annular	−0.4368	145	September 2, 2035 Total	0.3727
150	February 27, 2036 Partial	−1.1942	155	August 21, 2036 Partial	1.0825

=== Saros 140 ===
This eclipse is a part of Saros series 140, repeating every 18 years, 11 days, and containing 71 events. The series started with a partial solar eclipse on April 16, 1512. It contains total eclipses from July 21, 1656 through November 9, 1836; hybrid eclipses from November 20, 1854 through December 23, 1908; and annular eclipses from January 3, 1927 through December 7, 2485. The series ends at member 71 as a partial eclipse on June 1, 2774. Its eclipses are tabulated in three columns; every third eclipse in the same column is one exeligmos apart, so they all cast shadows over approximately the same parts of the Earth.

The longest duration of totality was produced by member 11 at 4 minutes, 10 seconds on August 12, 1692, and the longest duration of annularity will be produced by member 53 at 7 minutes, 35 seconds on November 15, 2449. All eclipses in this series occur at the Moon’s descending node of orbit.

Series members 18–39 occur between 1801 and 2200:
18	19	20
October 29, 1818	November 9, 1836	November 20, 1854
21	22	23
November 30, 1872	December 12, 1890	December 23, 1908
24	25	26
January 3, 1927	January 14, 1945	January 25, 1963
27	28	29
February 4, 1981	February 16, 1999	February 26, 2017
30	31	32
March 9, 2035	March 20, 2053	March 31, 2071
33	34	35
April 10, 2089	April 23, 2107	May 3, 2125
36	37	38
May 14, 2143	May 25, 2161	June 5, 2179
39
June 15, 2197

=== Metonic series ===
The metonic series repeats eclipses every 19 years (6939.69 days), lasting about 5 cycles. Eclipses occur in nearly the same calendar date. In addition, the octon subseries repeats 1/5 of that or every 3.8 years (1387.94 days). All eclipses in this table occur at the Moon's descending node.

21 eclipse events between May 21, 1993 and May 20, 2069
May 20–21	March 9	December 25–26	October 13–14	August 1–2
118	120	122	124	126
May 21, 1993	March 9, 1997	December 25, 2000	October 14, 2004	August 1, 2008
128	130	132	134	136
May 20, 2012	March 9, 2016	December 26, 2019	October 14, 2023	August 2, 2027
138	140	142	144	146
May 21, 2031	March 9, 2035	December 26, 2038	October 14, 2042	August 2, 2046
148	150	152	154	156
May 20, 2050	March 9, 2054	December 26, 2057	October 13, 2061	August 2, 2065
158
May 20, 2069

=== Tritos series ===
This eclipse is a part of a tritos cycle, repeating at alternating nodes every 135 synodic months (≈ 3986.63 days, or 11 years minus 1 month). Their appearance and longitude are irregular due to a lack of synchronization with the anomalistic month (period of perigee), but groupings of 3 tritos cycles (≈ 33 years minus 3 months) come close (≈ 434.044 anomalistic months), so eclipses are similar in these groupings.

Series members between 1801 and 2200
December 21, 1805 (Saros 119)	November 19, 1816 (Saros 120)	October 20, 1827 (Saros 121)	September 18, 1838 (Saros 122)	August 18, 1849 (Saros 123)
July 18, 1860 (Saros 124)	June 18, 1871 (Saros 125)	May 17, 1882 (Saros 126)	April 16, 1893 (Saros 127)	March 17, 1904 (Saros 128)
February 14, 1915 (Saros 129)	January 14, 1926 (Saros 130)	December 13, 1936 (Saros 131)	November 12, 1947 (Saros 132)	October 12, 1958 (Saros 133)
September 11, 1969 (Saros 134)	August 10, 1980 (Saros 135)	July 11, 1991 (Saros 136)	June 10, 2002 (Saros 137)	May 10, 2013 (Saros 138)
April 8, 2024 (Saros 139)	March 9, 2035 (Saros 140)	February 5, 2046 (Saros 141)	January 5, 2057 (Saros 142)	December 6, 2067 (Saros 143)
November 4, 2078 (Saros 144)	October 4, 2089 (Saros 145)	September 4, 2100 (Saros 146)	August 4, 2111 (Saros 147)	July 4, 2122 (Saros 148)
June 3, 2133 (Saros 149)	May 3, 2144 (Saros 150)	April 2, 2155 (Saros 151)	March 2, 2166 (Saros 152)	January 29, 2177 (Saros 153)
December 29, 2187 (Saros 154)	November 28, 2198 (Saros 155)			

=== Inex series ===
This eclipse is a part of the long period inex cycle, repeating at alternating nodes, every 358 synodic months (≈ 10,571.95 days, or 29 years minus 20 days). Their appearance and longitude are irregular due to a lack of synchronization with the anomalistic month (period of perigee). However, groupings of 3 inex cycles (≈ 87 years minus 2 months) comes close (≈ 1,151.02 anomalistic months), so eclipses are similar in these groupings.

Series members between 1801 and 2200
August 17, 1803 (Saros 132)	July 27, 1832 (Saros 133)	July 8, 1861 (Saros 134)
June 17, 1890 (Saros 135)	May 29, 1919 (Saros 136)	May 9, 1948 (Saros 137)
April 18, 1977 (Saros 138)	March 29, 2006 (Saros 139)	March 9, 2035 (Saros 140)
February 17, 2064 (Saros 141)	January 27, 2093 (Saros 142)	January 8, 2122 (Saros 143)
December 19, 2150 (Saros 144)	November 28, 2179 (Saros 145)	
