= Solar eclipse of January 5, 2057 =

Total eclipse

- Total eclipse
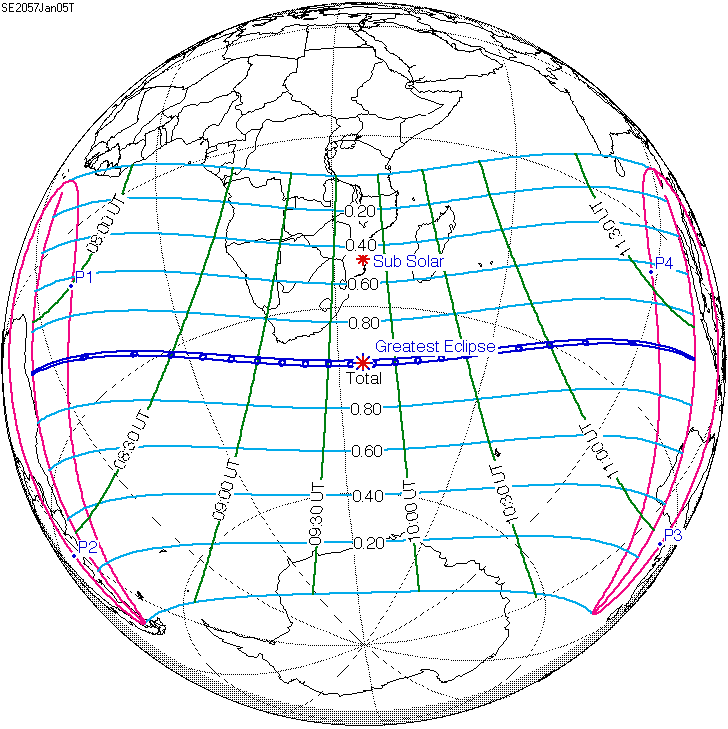
- Map
- Gamma: −0.2837
- Magnitude: 1.0287

Maximum eclipse
- Duration: 149 s (2 min 29 s)
- Coordinates: 39.2°S 35.2°E
- Max. width of band: 102 km (63 mi)

Times (UTC)
- Greatest eclipse: 9:47:52

References
- Saros: 142 (25 of 72)
- Catalog # (SE5000): 9634

A total solar eclipse will occur at the Moon's descending node of orbit on Friday, January 5, 2057, with a magnitude of 1.0287. A solar eclipse occurs when the Moon passes between Earth and the Sun, thereby totally or partly obscuring the image of the Sun for a viewer on Earth. A total solar eclipse occurs when the Moon's apparent diameter is larger than the Sun's, blocking all direct sunlight, turning day into darkness. Totality occurs in a narrow path across Earth's surface, with the partial solar eclipse visible over a surrounding region thousands of kilometres wide. Occurring about 1.6 days after perigee (on January 3, 2057, at 20:00 UTC), the Moon's apparent diameter will be larger.

This eclipse and May 20, 2050 are the next two total solar eclipses in which the Moon's shadow will trace a path that fails to hit land anywhere on Earth. Totality will begin 125 miles east of Belmonte in Brazil, then traverse southeast through the Atlantic Ocean where it will miss the Cape of Good Hope in South Africa by 250 miles, before winding northeast and concluding in the Indian Ocean 500 miles south of Java island. However, a partial solar eclipse will be visible for parts of eastern South America, Southern Africa, Antarctica, Southeast Asia, and western Australia.

== Eclipse details ==
Shown below are two tables displaying details about this particular solar eclipse. The first table outlines times at which the Moon's penumbra or umbra attains the specific parameter, and the second table describes various other parameters pertaining to this eclipse.

January 5, 2057 Solar Eclipse Times
Event	Time (UTC)
First Penumbral External Contact	2057 January 5 at 07:08:52.7 UTC
First Umbral External Contact	2057 January 5 at 08:06:59.9 UTC
First Central Line	2057 January 5 at 08:07:21.4 UTC
First Umbral Internal Contact	2057 January 5 at 08:07:42.8 UTC
First Penumbral Internal Contact	2057 January 5 at 09:10:27.5 UTC
Greatest Duration	2057 January 5 at 09:46:16.1 UTC
Equatorial Conjunction	2057 January 5 at 09:47:23.0 UTC
Greatest Eclipse	2057 January 5 at 09:47:52.2 UTC
Ecliptic Conjunction	2057 January 5 at 09:50:49.8 UTC
Last Penumbral Internal Contact	2057 January 5 at 10:25:16.8 UTC
Last Umbral Internal Contact	2057 January 5 at 11:28:04.0 UTC
Last Central Line	2057 January 5 at 11:28:23.7 UTC
Last Umbral External Contact	2057 January 5 at 11:28:43.3 UTC
Last Penumbral External Contact	2057 January 5 at 12:26:55.7 UTC

January 5, 2057 Solar Eclipse Parameters
Parameter	Value
Eclipse Magnitude	1.02873
Eclipse Obscuration	1.05829
Gamma	−0.28370
Sun Right Ascension	19h07m25.3s
Sun Declination	-22°31'37.8"
Sun Semi-Diameter	16'15.9"
Sun Equatorial Horizontal Parallax	08.9"
Moon Right Ascension	19h07m26.6s
Moon Declination	-22°48'43.6"
Moon Semi-Diameter	16'27.8"
Moon Equatorial Horizontal Parallax	1°00'25.4"
ΔT	88.4 s

== Eclipse season ==
This eclipse is part of an eclipse season, a period, roughly every six months, when eclipses occur. Only two (or occasionally three) eclipse seasons occur each year, and each season lasts about 35 days and repeats just short of six months (173 days) later; thus two full eclipse seasons always occur each year. Either two or three eclipses happen each eclipse season. In the sequence below, each eclipse is separated by a fortnight.

Eclipse season of December 2056–January 2057
December 22 Ascending node (full moon)	January 5 Descending node (new moon)
Penumbral lunar eclipse Lunar Saros 116	Total solar eclipse Solar Saros 142

== Related eclipses ==
=== Eclipses in 2057 ===
- A total solar eclipse on January 5.
- A partial lunar eclipse on June 17.
- An annular solar eclipse on July 1.
- A partial lunar eclipse on December 11.
- A total solar eclipse on December 26.

=== Metonic ===
- Preceded by: Solar eclipse of March 20, 2053
- Followed by: Solar eclipse of October 24, 2060

=== Tzolkinex ===
- Preceded by: Solar eclipse of November 25, 2049
- Followed by: Solar eclipse of February 17, 2064

=== Half-Saros ===
- Preceded by: Lunar eclipse of January 1, 2048
- Followed by: Lunar eclipse of January 11, 2066

=== Tritos ===
- Preceded by: Solar eclipse of February 5, 2046
- Followed by: Solar eclipse of December 6, 2067

=== Solar Saros 142 ===
- Preceded by: Solar eclipse of December 26, 2038
- Followed by: Solar eclipse of January 16, 2075

=== Inex ===
- Preceded by: Solar eclipse of January 26, 2028
- Followed by: Solar eclipse of December 16, 2085

=== Triad ===
- Preceded by: Solar eclipse of March 7, 1970
- Followed by: Solar eclipse of November 7, 2143

=== Solar eclipses of 2054–2058 ===
This eclipse is a member of a semester series. An eclipse in a semester series of solar eclipses repeats approximately every 177 days and 4 hours (a semester) at alternating nodes of the Moon's orbit.

The partial solar eclipses on March 9, 2054 and September 2, 2054 occur in the previous lunar year eclipse set, and the partial solar eclipses on May 22, 2058 and November 16, 2058 occur in the next lunar year eclipse set.

Solar eclipse series sets from 2054 to 2058
Ascending node			Descending node		
Saros	Map	Gamma	Saros	Map	Gamma
117	August 3, 2054 Partial	−1.4941	122	January 27, 2055 Partial	1.155
127	July 24, 2055 Total	−0.8012	132	January 16, 2056 Annular	0.4199
137	July 12, 2056 Annular	−0.0426	142	January 5, 2057 Total	−0.2837
147	July 1, 2057 Annular	0.7455	152	December 26, 2057 Total	−0.9405
157	June 21, 2058 Partial	1.4869			

=== Saros 142 ===
This eclipse is a part of Saros series 142, repeating every 18 years, 11 days, and containing 72 events. The series started with a partial solar eclipse on April 17, 1624. It contains a hybrid eclipse on July 14, 1768, and total eclipses from July 25, 1786 through October 29, 2543. There are no annular eclipses in this set. The series ends at member 72 as a partial eclipse on June 5, 2904. Its eclipses are tabulated in three columns; every third eclipse in the same column is one exeligmos apart, so they all cast shadows over approximately the same parts of the Earth.

The longest duration of totality will be produced by member 38 at 6 minutes, 34 seconds on May 28, 2291. All eclipses in this series occur at the Moon’s descending node of orbit.

Series members 11–32 occur between 1801 and 2200:
11	12	13
August 5, 1804	August 16, 1822	August 27, 1840
14	15	16
September 7, 1858	September 17, 1876	September 29, 1894
17	18	19
October 10, 1912	October 21, 1930	November 1, 1948
20	21	22
November 12, 1966	November 22, 1984	December 4, 2002
23	24	25
December 14, 2020	December 26, 2038	January 5, 2057
26	27	28
January 16, 2075	January 27, 2093	February 8, 2111
29	30	31
February 18, 2129	March 2, 2147	March 12, 2165
32
March 23, 2183

=== Metonic series ===
The metonic series repeats eclipses every 19 years (6939.69 days), lasting about 5 cycles. Eclipses occur in nearly the same calendar date. In addition, the octon subseries repeats 1/5 of that or every 3.8 years (1387.94 days). All eclipses in this table occur at the Moon's descending node.

22 eclipse events between June 1, 2011 and October 24, 2098
May 31–June 1	March 19–20	January 5–6	October 24–25	August 12–13
118	120	122	124	126
June 1, 2011	March 20, 2015	January 6, 2019	October 25, 2022	August 12, 2026
128	130	132	134	136
June 1, 2030	March 20, 2034	January 5, 2038	October 25, 2041	August 12, 2045
138	140	142	144	146
May 31, 2049	March 20, 2053	January 5, 2057	October 24, 2060	August 12, 2064
148	150	152	154	156
May 31, 2068	March 19, 2072	January 6, 2076	October 24, 2079	August 13, 2083
158	160	162	164	
June 1, 2087			October 24, 2098	

=== Tritos series ===
This eclipse is a part of a tritos cycle, repeating at alternating nodes every 135 synodic months (≈ 3986.63 days, or 11 years minus 1 month). Their appearance and longitude are irregular due to a lack of synchronization with the anomalistic month (period of perigee), but groupings of 3 tritos cycles (≈ 33 years minus 3 months) come close (≈ 434.044 anomalistic months), so eclipses are similar in these groupings.

Series members between 1801 and 2200
December 21, 1805 (Saros 119)	November 19, 1816 (Saros 120)	October 20, 1827 (Saros 121)	September 18, 1838 (Saros 122)	August 18, 1849 (Saros 123)
July 18, 1860 (Saros 124)	June 18, 1871 (Saros 125)	May 17, 1882 (Saros 126)	April 16, 1893 (Saros 127)	March 17, 1904 (Saros 128)
February 14, 1915 (Saros 129)	January 14, 1926 (Saros 130)	December 13, 1936 (Saros 131)	November 12, 1947 (Saros 132)	October 12, 1958 (Saros 133)
September 11, 1969 (Saros 134)	August 10, 1980 (Saros 135)	July 11, 1991 (Saros 136)	June 10, 2002 (Saros 137)	May 10, 2013 (Saros 138)
April 8, 2024 (Saros 139)	March 9, 2035 (Saros 140)	February 5, 2046 (Saros 141)	January 5, 2057 (Saros 142)	December 6, 2067 (Saros 143)
November 4, 2078 (Saros 144)	October 4, 2089 (Saros 145)	September 4, 2100 (Saros 146)	August 4, 2111 (Saros 147)	July 4, 2122 (Saros 148)
June 3, 2133 (Saros 149)	May 3, 2144 (Saros 150)	April 2, 2155 (Saros 151)	March 2, 2166 (Saros 152)	January 29, 2177 (Saros 153)
December 29, 2187 (Saros 154)	November 28, 2198 (Saros 155)			

=== Inex series ===
This eclipse is a part of the long period inex cycle, repeating at alternating nodes, every 358 synodic months (≈ 10,571.95 days, or 29 years minus 20 days). Their appearance and longitude are irregular due to a lack of synchronization with the anomalistic month (period of perigee). However, groupings of 3 inex cycles (≈ 87 years minus 2 months) comes close (≈ 1,151.02 anomalistic months), so eclipses are similar in these groupings.

Series members between 1801 and 2200
June 16, 1825 (Saros 134)	May 26, 1854 (Saros 135)	May 6, 1883 (Saros 136)
April 17, 1912 (Saros 137)	March 27, 1941 (Saros 138)	March 7, 1970 (Saros 139)
February 16, 1999 (Saros 140)	January 26, 2028 (Saros 141)	January 5, 2057 (Saros 142)
December 16, 2085 (Saros 143)	November 27, 2114 (Saros 144)	November 7, 2143 (Saros 145)
October 17, 2172 (Saros 146)		
