= Solar eclipse of January 4, 1992 =

20th-century annular solar eclipse

- Annular eclipse
- Map
- Gamma: 0.4091
- Magnitude: 0.9179

Maximum eclipse
- Duration: 701 s (11 min 41 s)
- Coordinates: 1°N 169.7°W
- Max. width of band: 340 km (210 mi)

Times (UTC)
- Greatest eclipse: 23:05:37

References
- Saros: 141 (22 of 70)
- Catalog # (SE5000): 9490

External images
- https://web.archive.org/web/20130530114447/http://www.astro.uni-bonn.de/~dfischer/skyreports/cal92/
- https://www.normankoren.com/Image1989/Eclipse92_2Acomp.html

An annular solar eclipse occurred at the Moon's ascending node of orbit between Saturday, January 4 and Sunday, January 5, 1992, with a magnitude of 0.9179. A solar eclipse occurs when the Moon passes between Earth and the Sun, thereby totally or partly obscuring the image of the Sun for a viewer on Earth. An annular solar eclipse occurs when the Moon's apparent diameter is smaller than the Sun's, blocking most of the Sun's light and causing the Sun to look like an annulus (ring). An annular eclipse appears as a partial eclipse over a region of the Earth thousands of kilometres wide. Occurring about 1.5 days before apogee (on January 6, 1992, at 11:40 UTC), the Moon's apparent diameter was smaller.

The duration of annularity at maximum eclipse (closest to but slightly shorter than the longest duration) was 11 minutes, 40.9 seconds in the Pacific. It will have been the longest annular solar eclipse until January 2, 3062, but the solar eclipse of December 24, 1973 lasted longer.

Annularity was visible in the Federal States of Micronesia, Nauru, Kiribati, Baker Island, Palmyra Atoll, Kingman Reef, and southwestern California, including the southwestern part of Los Angeles. A partial eclipse was visible for parts of Northeast Asia, Northern Australia, Oceania, Hawaii, and western North America.

== Observations ==
Animated path

In San Diego, the eclipse was described as "thrilling", with one observer saying it "looked like God was putting out a fire in the ocean". At other locations (like northeast Australia and the southern Philippines), it was partially obscured by clouds. Most attempts to view the eclipse from Los Angeles were unsuccessful due to cloud cover (and rain which ruined several campsites set up for eclipse-viewing). An astronomer there said that, while around ten thousand people had gathered there to watch the event, it was "completely socked up" and "as if there was no eclipse at all".

While it was only a partial eclipse in Hawaii, people nonetheless gathered to watch it; a museum reported 3,000 people in attendance during the event, although it was noted that "it was hard to tell who were there for the eclipse and who just kind of stumbled upon it".

== Eclipse timing ==
=== Places experiencing annular eclipse ===
Solar Eclipse of January 4, 1992 (Local Times)
Country or territory	City or place	Start of partial eclipse	Start of annular eclipse	Maximum eclipse	End of annular eclipse	End of partial eclipse	Duration of annularity (min:s)	Duration of eclipse (hr:min)	Maximum coverage
Federated States of Micronesia	Colonia (Note: The times listed for this location occur on January 5, 1992, local time.)	07:04:48 (sunrise)	07:13:41	07:15:25	07:17:08	08:36:36	3:27	1:32	82.11%
Nauru	Yaren	08:09:27	09:39:50	09:43:43	09:47:38	11:45:17	7:48	3:36	83.63%
Kiribati	Tabiteuea	08:18:01	09:59:00	10:04:16	10:09:34	12:16:26	10:34	3:58	84.00%
United States Minor Outlying Islands	Baker Island	08:34:44	10:32:30	10:36:39	10:40:48	12:51:02	8:18	4:16	84.29%
United States	San Bernardino	15:34:19	16:49:33	16:49:50	16:52:46	16:52:46 (sunset)	3:13	1:18	81.97%
United States	Moreno Valley	15:34:25	16:49:26	16:50:02	16:52:57	16:52:57 (sunset)	3:31	1:19	81.97%
United States	Riverside	15:34:17	16:49:29	16:50:38	16:53:34	16:53:35 (sunset)	4:05	1:19	81.97%
United States	Rancho Cucamonga	15:34:04	16:49:39	16:51:03	16:53:59	16:53:59 (sunset)	4:20	1:20	81.97%
United States	Ontario	15:34:02	16:49:38	16:51:23	16:54:19	16:54:19 (sunset)	4:41	1:20	81.97%
United States	Escondido	15:34:51	16:49:30	16:51:27	16:54:21	16:54:21 (sunset)	4:51	1:20	81.97%
United States	Pomona	15:33:57	16:49:40	16:51:48	16:54:44	16:54:45 (sunset)	5:04	1:21	81.97%
United States	Santa Clarita	15:33:11	16:51:13	16:52:15	16:53:18	16:57:05 (sunset)	2:05	1:24	81.98%
United States	Simi Valley	15:33:02	16:51:08	16:52:15	16:53:24	16:58:20 (sunset)	2:16	1:25	81.99%
United States	Thousand Oaks	15:33:01	16:50:48	16:52:18	16:53:48	16:58:48 (sunset)	3:00	1:26	82.00%
United States	Glendale	15:33:31	16:50:04	16:52:26	16:54:49	16:56:31 (sunset)	4:45	1:23	81.98%
United States	Hollywood	15:33:27	16:50:04	16:52:26	16:54:49	16:56:58 (sunset)	4:45	1:24	81.98%
United States	Huntington Beach	15:33:53	16:49:29	16:52:28	16:55:57	16:56:40 (sunset)	6:28	1:23	81.98%
United States	Oceanside	15:34:34	16:49:25	16:52:28	16:55:21	16:55:22 (sunset)	5:56	1:21	81.97%
United States	Los Angeles	15:33:32	16:49:56	16:52:28	16:55:03	16:56:46 (sunset)	5:07	1:23	81.98%
United States	Pasadena	15:33:36	16:50:00	16:52:28	16:54:55	16:56:05 (sunset)	4:55	1:22	81.97%
United States	Santa Ana	15:33:58	16:49:29	16:52:28	16:55:56	16:55:59 (sunset)	6:27	1:22	81.97%
United States	El Monte	15:33:43	16:49:50	16:52:28	16:55:12	16:55:50 (sunset)	5:22	1:22	81.97%
United States	Anaheim	15:33:54	16:49:33	16:52:28	16:55:46	16:55:56 (sunset)	6:13	1:22	81.97%
United States	San Diego	15:34:56	16:49:46	16:52:28	16:55:38	16:55:39 (sunset)	5:52	1:21	81.97%
United States	Fullerton	15:33:52	16:49:35	16:52:28	16:55:42	16:55:55 (sunset)	6:07	1:22	81.97%
United States	Long Beach	15:33:41	16:49:36	16:52:28	16:55:40	16:57:11 (sunset)	6:04	1:24	81.98%
United States	Chula Vista	15:35:02	16:49:52	16:52:28	16:55:31	16:55:31 (sunset)	5:39	1:20	81.97%
Mexico	Tijuana	15:35:07	16:50:01	16:52:28	16:55:35	16:55:36 (sunset)	5:34	1:20	81.97%
United States	Inglewood	15:33:29	16:49:52	16:52:31	16:55:09	16:57:23 (sunset)	5:17	1:24	81.98%
United States	Torrance	15:33:32	16:49:43	16:52:35	16:55:26	16:57:39 (sunset)	5:43	1:24	81.99%

=== Places experiencing partial eclipse ===
Solar Eclipse of January 4, 1992 (Local Times)
Country or territory	City or place	Start of partial eclipse	Maximum eclipse	End of partial eclipse	Duration of eclipse (hr:min)	Maximum coverage
Indonesia	Manokwari	06:03:32 (sunrise)	06:13:11	07:24:05	1:21	48.02%
Palau	Ngerulmud	06:15:22 (sunrise)	06:17:45	07:31:22	1:16	73.03%
Papua New Guinea	Port Moresby	06:12:48	07:18:50	08:37:12	2:24	38.87%
Guam	Hagåtña	06:45:09 (sunrise)	07:19:55	08:47:42	2:03	74.30%
Papua New Guinea	Rabaul	06:06:06	07:21:26	08:54:15	2:48	60.51%
Northern Mariana Islands	Saipan	06:44:13 (sunrise)	07:21:36	08:49:48	2:06	68.20%
Papua New Guinea	Buka	06:06:49	07:24:06	08:59:54	2:53	59.62%
Papua New Guinea	Arawa	06:07:27	07:25:13	09:01:40	2:54	58.16%
Federated States of Micronesia	Palikir	07:06:02	08:29:54	10:17:08	3:11	78.26%
Solomon Islands	Honiara	07:10:57	08:31:30	10:11:29	3:01	52.87%
Vanuatu	Port Vila	08:26:57	09:47:50	11:24:17	2:57	34.24%
United States Minor Outlying Islands	Wake Island	08:30:04	09:56:26	11:44:15	3:14	37.57%
Marshall Islands	Majuro	08:18:00	09:58:47	12:07:19	3:49	67.24%
Japan	Tokyo	06:51:29 (sunrise)	06:59:15	07:47:07	0:56	20.94%
Kiribati	Tarawa	08:16:20	10:00:14	12:11:37	3:55	82.75%
Fiji	Suva	08:37:38	10:09:58	11:55:29	3:18	36.73%
Tuvalu	Funafuti	08:26:28	10:14:49	12:21:56	3:55	67.66%
Tonga	Nuku'alofa	09:55:13	11:25:17	13:02:13	3:07	27.10%
Wallis and Futuna	Mata Utu	08:39:10	10:26:35	12:25:00	3:46	51.38%
United States Minor Outlying Islands	Howland Island	08:34:47	10:36:44	12:51:20	4:17	84.14%
Samoa	Apia	09:49:40	11:39:37	13:34:34	3:45	47.41%
Niue	Alofi	10:02:51	11:40:33	13:20:59	3:18	30.48%
American Samoa	Pago Pago	09:52:55	11:42:29	13:35:35	3:43	45.27%
Tokelau	Fakaofo	09:47:16	11:45:52	13:48:04	4:01	61.01%
Kiribati	Kiritimati	11:38:34	13:47:53	15:35:29	3:57	73.18%
United States	Honolulu	12:10:16	14:09:00	15:47:06	3:37	56.68%
Canada	Vancouver	15:26:39	16:23:06	16:27:18 (sunset)	1:01	36.31%
Mexico	Hermosillo	16:41:48	17:36:25	17:39:09 (sunset)	0:57	54.27%
Mexico	Mexicali	15:36:23	16:46:06	16:48:59 (sunset)	1:13	77.10%
United States	San Francisco	15:29:09	16:49:12	17:03:43 (sunset)	1:35	69.79%

== Eclipse details ==
Shown below are two tables displaying details about this particular solar eclipse. The first table outlines times at which the Moon's penumbra or umbra attains the specific parameter, and the second table describes various other parameters pertaining to this eclipse.

January 4, 1992 Solar Eclipse Times
Event	Time (UTC)
First Penumbral External Contact	1992 January 04 at 20:04:35.0 UTC
First Umbral External Contact	1992 January 04 at 21:13:17.2 UTC
First Central Line	1992 January 04 at 21:17:01.0 UTC
First Umbral Internal Contact	1992 January 04 at 21:20:46.2 UTC
First Penumbral Internal Contact	1992 January 04 at 22:52:57.9 UTC
Greatest Duration	1992 January 04 at 22:56:52.3 UTC
Greatest Eclipse	1992 January 04 at 23:05:37.0 UTC
Ecliptic Conjunction	1992 January 04 at 23:10:33.0 UTC
Equatorial Conjunction	1992 January 04 at 23:15:42.7 UTC
Last Penumbral Internal Contact	1992 January 04 at 23:18:00.0 UTC
Last Umbral Internal Contact	1992 January 05 at 00:50:20.4 UTC
Last Central Line	1992 January 05 at 00:54:06.6 UTC
Last Umbral External Contact	1992 January 05 at 00:57:51.5 UTC
Last Penumbral External Contact	1992 January 05 at 02:06:36.8 UTC

January 4, 1992 Solar Eclipse Parameters
Parameter	Value
Eclipse Magnitude	0.91791
Eclipse Obscuration	0.84256
Gamma	0.40908
Sun Right Ascension	19h00m10.0s
Sun Declination	-22°43'13.0"
Sun Semi-Diameter	16'15.9"
Sun Equatorial Horizontal Parallax	08.9"
Moon Right Ascension	18h59m50.7s
Moon Declination	-22°21'37.6"
Moon Semi-Diameter	14'43.6"
Moon Equatorial Horizontal Parallax	0°54'02.8"
ΔT	58.3 s

== Eclipse season ==
This eclipse is part of an eclipse season, a period, roughly every six months, when eclipses occur. Only two (or occasionally three) eclipse seasons occur each year, and each season lasts about 35 days and repeats just short of six months (173 days) later; thus two full eclipse seasons always occur each year. Either two or three eclipses happen each eclipse season. In the sequence below, each eclipse is separated by a fortnight.

Eclipse season of December 1991–January 1992
December 21 Descending node (full moon)	January 4 Ascending node (new moon)
Partial lunar eclipse Lunar Saros 115	Annular solar eclipse Solar Saros 141

== Related eclipses ==
=== Eclipses in 1992 ===
- An annular solar eclipse on January 4.
- A partial lunar eclipse on June 15.
- A total solar eclipse on June 30.
- A total lunar eclipse on December 9.
- A partial solar eclipse on December 24.

=== Metonic ===
- Preceded by: Solar eclipse of March 18, 1988
- Followed by: Solar eclipse of October 24, 1995

=== Tzolkinex ===
- Preceded by: Solar eclipse of November 22, 1984
- Followed by: Solar eclipse of February 16, 1999

=== Half-Saros ===
- Preceded by: Lunar eclipse of December 30, 1982
- Followed by: Lunar eclipse of January 9, 2001

=== Tritos ===
- Preceded by: Solar eclipse of February 4, 1981
- Followed by: Solar eclipse of December 4, 2002

=== Solar Saros 141 ===
- Preceded by: Solar eclipse of December 24, 1973
- Followed by: Solar eclipse of January 15, 2010

=== Inex ===
- Preceded by: Solar eclipse of January 25, 1963
- Followed by: Solar eclipse of December 14, 2020

=== Triad ===
- Preceded by: Solar eclipse of March 6, 1905
- Followed by: Solar eclipse of November 4, 2078

=== Solar eclipses of 1990–1992 ===
This eclipse is a member of a semester series. An eclipse in a semester series of solar eclipses repeats approximately every 177 days and 4 hours (a semester) at alternating nodes of the Moon's orbit.

Solar eclipse series sets from 1990 to 1992
Ascending node			Descending node		
Saros	Map	Gamma	Saros	Map	Gamma
121	January 26, 1990 Annular	−0.9457	126 Partial in Finland	July 22, 1990 Total	0.7597
131	January 15, 1991 Annular	−0.2727	136 Totality in Playas del Coco, Costa Rica	July 11, 1991 Total	−0.0041
141	January 4, 1992 Annular	0.4091	146	June 30, 1992 Total	−0.7512
151	December 24, 1992 Partial	1.0711			

=== Saros 141 ===
This eclipse is a part of Saros series 141, repeating every 18 years, 11 days, and containing 70 events. The series started with a partial solar eclipse on May 19, 1613. It contains annular eclipses from August 4, 1739 through October 14, 2640. There are no hybrid or total eclipses in this set. The series ends at member 70 as a partial eclipse on June 13, 2857. Its eclipses are tabulated in three columns; every third eclipse in the same column is one exeligmos apart, so they all cast shadows over approximately the same parts of the Earth.

The longest duration of annularity was produced by member 20 at 12 minutes, 9 seconds on December 14, 1955. All eclipses in this series occur at the Moon’s ascending node of orbit.

Series members 12–33 occur between 1801 and 2200:
12	13	14
September 17, 1811	September 28, 1829	October 9, 1847
15	16	17
October 19, 1865	October 30, 1883	November 11, 1901
18	19	20
November 22, 1919	December 2, 1937	December 14, 1955
21	22	23
December 24, 1973	January 4, 1992	January 15, 2010
24	25	26
January 26, 2028	February 5, 2046	February 17, 2064
27	28	29
February 27, 2082	March 10, 2100	March 22, 2118
30	31	32
April 1, 2136	April 12, 2154	April 23, 2172
33
May 4, 2190

=== Metonic series ===
The metonic series repeats eclipses every 19 years (6939.69 days), lasting about 5 cycles. Eclipses occur in nearly the same calendar date. In addition, the octon subseries repeats 1/5 of that or every 3.8 years (1387.94 days). All eclipses in this table occur at the Moon's ascending node.

22 eclipse events between January 5, 1935 and August 11, 2018
January 4–5	October 23–24	August 10–12	May 30–31	March 18–19
111	113	115	117	119
January 5, 1935		August 12, 1942	May 30, 1946	March 18, 1950
121	123	125	127	129
January 5, 1954	October 23, 1957	August 11, 1961	May 30, 1965	March 18, 1969
131	133	135	137	139
January 4, 1973	October 23, 1976	August 10, 1980	May 30, 1984	March 18, 1988
141	143	145	147	149
January 4, 1992	October 24, 1995	August 11, 1999	May 31, 2003	March 19, 2007
151	153	155		
January 4, 2011	October 23, 2014	August 11, 2018		

=== Tritos series ===
This eclipse is a part of a tritos cycle, repeating at alternating nodes every 135 synodic months (≈ 3986.63 days, or 11 years minus 1 month). Their appearance and longitude are irregular due to a lack of synchronization with the anomalistic month (period of perigee), but groupings of 3 tritos cycles (≈ 33 years minus 3 months) come close (≈ 434.044 anomalistic months), so eclipses are similar in these groupings.

Series members between 1801 and 2200
June 16, 1806 (Saros 124)	May 16, 1817 (Saros 125)	April 14, 1828 (Saros 126)	March 15, 1839 (Saros 127)	February 12, 1850 (Saros 128)
January 11, 1861 (Saros 129)	December 12, 1871 (Saros 130)	November 10, 1882 (Saros 131)	October 9, 1893 (Saros 132)	September 9, 1904 (Saros 133)
August 10, 1915 (Saros 134)	July 9, 1926 (Saros 135)	June 8, 1937 (Saros 136)	May 9, 1948 (Saros 137)	April 8, 1959 (Saros 138)
March 7, 1970 (Saros 139)	February 4, 1981 (Saros 140)	January 4, 1992 (Saros 141)	December 4, 2002 (Saros 142)	November 3, 2013 (Saros 143)
October 2, 2024 (Saros 144)	September 2, 2035 (Saros 145)	August 2, 2046 (Saros 146)	July 1, 2057 (Saros 147)	May 31, 2068 (Saros 148)
May 1, 2079 (Saros 149)	March 31, 2090 (Saros 150)	February 28, 2101 (Saros 151)	January 29, 2112 (Saros 152)	December 28, 2122 (Saros 153)
November 26, 2133 (Saros 154)	October 26, 2144 (Saros 155)	September 26, 2155 (Saros 156)	August 25, 2166 (Saros 157)	July 25, 2177 (Saros 158)
June 24, 2188 (Saros 159)	May 24, 2199 (Saros 160)			

=== Inex series ===
This eclipse is a part of the long period inex cycle, repeating at alternating nodes, every 358 synodic months (≈ 10,571.95 days, or 29 years minus 20 days). Their appearance and longitude are irregular due to a lack of synchronization with the anomalistic month (period of perigee). However, groupings of 3 inex cycles (≈ 87 years minus 2 months) comes close (≈ 1,151.02 anomalistic months), so eclipses are similar in these groupings.

Series members between 1801 and 2200
May 5, 1818 (Saros 135)	April 15, 1847 (Saros 136)	March 25, 1876 (Saros 137)
March 6, 1905 (Saros 138)	February 14, 1934 (Saros 139)	January 25, 1963 (Saros 140)
January 4, 1992 (Saros 141)	December 14, 2020 (Saros 142)	November 25, 2049 (Saros 143)
November 4, 2078 (Saros 144)	October 16, 2107 (Saros 145)	September 26, 2136 (Saros 146)
September 5, 2165 (Saros 147)	August 16, 2194 (Saros 148)	
