= Solar eclipse of November 25, 2049 =

Total eclipse

- Hybrid eclipse
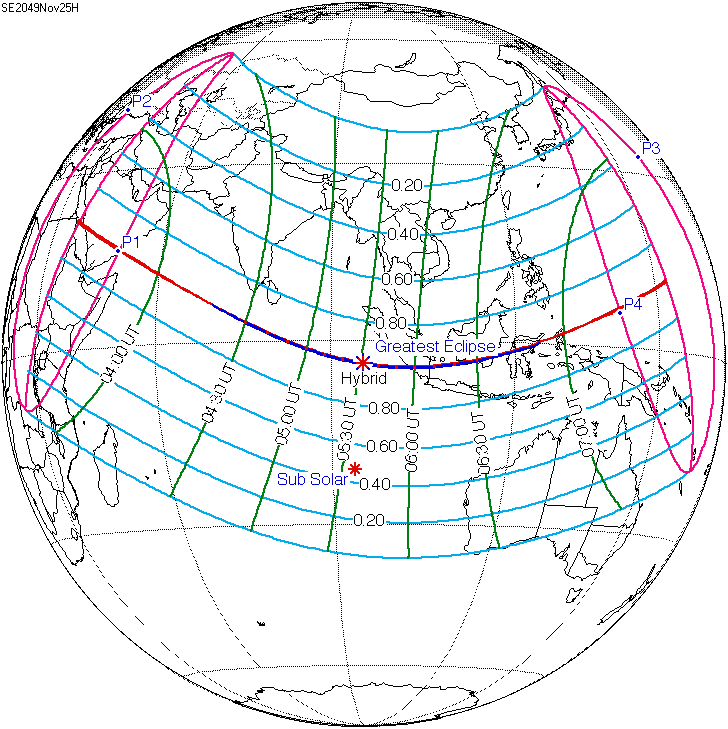
- Map
- Gamma: 0.2943
- Magnitude: 1.0057

Maximum eclipse
- Duration: 38 s (0 min 38 s)
- Coordinates: 3.8°S 95.2°E
- Max. width of band: 21 km (13 mi)

Times (UTC)
- Greatest eclipse: 5:33:48

References
- Saros: 143 (25 of 72)
- Catalog # (SE5000): 9618

A total solar eclipse will occur at the Moon's ascending node of orbit on Thursday, November 25, 2049, with a magnitude of 1.0057. It is a hybrid event, with only a fraction of its path as total, and longer sections at the start and end as an annular eclipse. A solar eclipse occurs when the Moon passes between Earth and the Sun, thereby totally or partly obscuring the image of the Sun for a viewer on Earth. An annular solar eclipse occurs when the Moon's apparent diameter is smaller than the Sun's, blocking most of the Sun's light and causing the Sun to look like an annulus (ring). An annular eclipse appears as a partial eclipse over a region of the Earth thousands of kilometres wide. Occurring about 3.2 days before perigee (on November 28, 2049, at 11:05 UTC), the Moon's apparent diameter will be larger.

The path of the eclipse will be visible as an annular eclipse from parts of Saudi Arabia and Yemen before transitioning to a total eclipse. Totality will be visible from parts of Indonesia before the eclipse transforms back to an annular eclipse, then passing over Micronesia. A partial solar eclipse will also be visible for parts of East Africa, the Middle East, Central Asia, South Asia, Southeast Asia, and Australia.

== Images ==
Animated path

== Eclipse timing ==
=== Places experiencing partial eclipse ===
Solar Eclipse of November 25, 2049 (Local Times)
Country or territory	City or place	Start of partial eclipse	Maximum eclipse	End of partial eclipse	Duration of eclipse (hr:min)	Maximum coverage
Eritrea	Asmara	06:31:24 (sunrise)	06:48:51	07:54:19	1:23	79.87%
Sudan	Port Sudan	05:45:24 (sunrise)	05:49:07	06:54:11	1:09	92.94%
Saudi Arabia	Mecca	06:38:20 (sunrise)	06:49:48	07:56:18	1:18	94.68%
Djibouti	Djibouti	06:08:35 (sunrise)	06:49:57	07:57:28	1:49	72.74%
Yemen	Sanaa	06:10:19 (sunrise)	06:50:03	07:59:22	1:49	87.98%
Somalia	Bosaso	05:49:16	06:52:29	08:05:12	2:16	81.33%
Saudi Arabia	Riyadh	06:16:14 (sunrise)	06:52:40	08:01:43	1:45	73.39%
Bahrain	Manama	06:03:43 (sunrise)	06:55:04	08:04:45	2:01	62.46%
Oman	Salalah	06:48:58	07:55:05	09:11:36	2:23	88.77%
Qatar	Doha	05:58:10 (sunrise)	06:55:12	08:05:56	2:08	64.19%
United Arab Emirates	Abu Dhabi	06:53:10	07:56:41	09:09:13	2:16	62.67%
United Arab Emirates	Dubai	06:54:17	07:57:38	09:09:52	2:16	58.72%
Sudan	Khartoum	05:57:28 (sunrise)	05:59:54	06:49:44	0:52	63.17%
India	Mumbai	08:33:35	09:47:50	11:14:31	2:41	51.67%
Maldives	Malé	08:01:37	09:24:21	11:03:01	3:01	99.79%
India	Bengaluru	08:36:23	09:58:36	11:35:19	2:59	63.19%
India	Thiruvananthapuram	08:34:31	09:59:09	11:39:27	3:05	79.27%
Sri Lanka	Sri Jayawardenepura Kotte	08:39:01	10:07:11	11:50:50	3:12	80.01%
Malaysia	Kuala Lumpur	12:04:33	13:52:48	15:33:49	3:29	72.15%
Singapore	Singapore	12:11:48	14:01:06	15:40:20	3:29	79.06%
Christmas Island	Flying Fish Cove	11:24:13	13:08:26	14:42:16	3:18	76.35%
Indonesia	Jakarta	11:24:13	13:11:49	14:47:04	3:23	92.76%
Brunei	Bandar Seri Begawan	12:52:47	14:34:16	15:59:17	3:07	71.75%
Timor-Leste	Dili	14:26:36	15:53:13	17:06:21	2:40	66.38%
Philippines	General Santos	13:24:50	14:55:13	16:10:23	2:46	78.32%
Philippines	Davao City	13:26:22	14:55:48	16:10:17	2:44	75.39%
Federated States of Micronesia	Palikir	17:14:18	18:05:02	18:07:21 (sunset)	0:53	67.07%
Palau	Ngerulmud	14:46:28	16:07:02	17:15:09	2:29	85.72%
Guam	Hagåtña	16:01:42	17:12:33	17:50:44 (sunset)	1:49	78.17%
Federated States of Micronesia	Weno	16:09:25	17:15:57	17:31:48 (sunset)	1:22	88.16%

== Eclipse details ==
Shown below are two tables displaying details about this particular solar eclipse. The first table outlines times at which the Moon's penumbra or umbra attains the specific parameter, and the second table describes various other parameters pertaining to this eclipse.

November 25, 2049 Solar Eclipse Times
Event	Time (UTC)
First Penumbral External Contact	2049 November 25 at 02:49:44.1 UTC
First Umbral External Contact	2049 November 25 at 03:50:24.6 UTC
First Central Line	2049 November 25 at 03:50:45.7 UTC
Greatest Duration	2049 November 25 at 03:50:45.7 UTC
First Umbral Internal Contact	2049 November 25 at 03:51:06.8 UTC
First Penumbral Internal Contact	2049 November 25 at 04:57:11.0 UTC
Equatorial Conjunction	2049 November 25 at 05:30:50.7 UTC
Greatest Eclipse	2049 November 25 at 05:33:47.9 UTC
Ecliptic Conjunction	2049 November 25 at 05:36:57.1 UTC
Last Penumbral Internal Contact	2049 November 25 at 06:10:30.6 UTC
Last Umbral Internal Contact	2049 November 25 at 07:16:33.1 UTC
Last Central Line	2049 November 25 at 07:16:51.6 UTC
Last Umbral External Contact	2049 November 25 at 07:17:10.1 UTC
Last Penumbral External Contact	2049 November 25 at 08:17:47.4 UTC

November 25, 2049 Solar Eclipse Parameters
Parameter	Value
Eclipse Magnitude	1.00570
Eclipse Obscuration	1.01144
Gamma	0.29427
Sun Right Ascension	16h05m24.9s
Sun Declination	-20°49'25.8"
Sun Semi-Diameter	16'12.0"
Sun Equatorial Horizontal Parallax	08.9"
Moon Right Ascension	16h05m31.7s
Moon Declination	-20°32'13.6"
Moon Semi-Diameter	16'02.3"
Moon Equatorial Horizontal Parallax	0°58'51.9"
ΔT	84.0 s

== Eclipse season ==
This eclipse is part of an eclipse season, a period, roughly every six months, when eclipses occur. Only two (or occasionally three) eclipse seasons occur each year, and each season lasts about 35 days and repeats just short of six months (173 days) later; thus two full eclipse seasons always occur each year. Either two or three eclipses happen each eclipse season. In the sequence below, each eclipse is separated by a fortnight.

Eclipse season of November 2049
November 9 Descending node (full moon)	November 25 Ascending node (new moon)
Penumbral lunar eclipse Lunar Saros 117	Hybrid solar eclipse Solar Saros 143

== Related eclipses ==
=== Eclipses in 2049 ===
- A penumbral lunar eclipse on May 17.
- An annular solar eclipse on May 31.
- A penumbral lunar eclipse on June 15.
- A penumbral lunar eclipse on November 9.
- A hybrid solar eclipse on November 25.

=== Metonic ===
- Preceded by: Solar eclipse of February 5, 2046
- Followed by: Solar eclipse of September 12, 2053

=== Tzolkinex ===
- Preceded by: Solar eclipse of October 14, 2042
- Followed by: Solar eclipse of January 5, 2057

=== Half-Saros ===
- Preceded by: Lunar eclipse of November 18, 2040
- Followed by: Lunar eclipse of November 30, 2058

=== Tritos ===
- Preceded by: Solar eclipse of December 26, 2038
- Followed by: Solar eclipse of October 24, 2060

=== Solar Saros 143 ===
- Preceded by: Solar eclipse of November 14, 2031
- Followed by: Solar eclipse of December 6, 2067

=== Inex ===
- Preceded by: Solar eclipse of December 14, 2020
- Followed by: Solar eclipse of November 4, 2078

=== Triad ===
- Preceded by: Solar eclipse of January 25, 1963
- Followed by: Solar eclipse of September 26, 2136

=== Solar eclipses of 2047–2050 ===
This eclipse is a member of a semester series. An eclipse in a semester series of solar eclipses repeats approximately every 177 days and 4 hours (a semester) at alternating nodes of the Moon's orbit.

The partial solar eclipses on January 26, 2047 and July 22, 2047 occur in the previous lunar year eclipse set.

Solar eclipse series sets from 2047 to 2050
Descending node			Ascending node		
Saros	Map	Gamma	Saros	Map	Gamma
118	June 23, 2047 Partial	1.3766	123	December 16, 2047 Partial	−1.0661
128	June 11, 2048 Annular	0.6468	133	December 5, 2048 Total	−0.3973
138	May 31, 2049 Annular	−0.1187	143	November 25, 2049 Hybrid	0.2943
148	May 20, 2050 Hybrid	−0.8688	153	November 14, 2050 Partial	1.0447

=== Saros 143 ===
This eclipse is a part of Saros series 143, repeating every 18 years, 11 days, and containing 72 events. The series started with a partial solar eclipse on March 7, 1617. It contains total eclipses from June 24, 1797 through October 24, 1995; hybrid eclipses from November 3, 2013 through December 6, 2067; and annular eclipses from December 16, 2085 through September 16, 2536. The series ends at member 72 as a partial eclipse on April 23, 2897. Its eclipses are tabulated in three columns; every third eclipse in the same column is one exeligmos apart, so they all cast shadows over approximately the same parts of the Earth.

The longest duration of totality was produced by member 16 at 3 minutes, 50 seconds on August 19, 1887, and the longest duration of annularity will be produced by member 51 at 4 minutes, 54 seconds on September 6, 2518. All eclipses in this series occur at the Moon’s ascending node of orbit.

Series members 12–33 occur between 1801 and 2200:
12	13	14
July 6, 1815	July 17, 1833	July 28, 1851
15	16	17
August 7, 1869	August 19, 1887	August 30, 1905
18	19	20
September 10, 1923	September 21, 1941	October 2, 1959
21	22	23
October 12, 1977	October 24, 1995	November 3, 2013
24	25	26
November 14, 2031	November 25, 2049	December 6, 2067
27	28	29
December 16, 2085	December 29, 2103	January 8, 2122
30	31	32
January 20, 2140	January 30, 2158	February 10, 2176
33
February 21, 2194

=== Metonic series ===
The metonic series repeats eclipses every 19 years (6939.69 days), lasting about 5 cycles. Eclipses occur in nearly the same calendar date. In addition, the octon subseries repeats 1/5 of that or every 3.8 years (1387.94 days). All eclipses in this table occur at the Moon's ascending node.

21 eclipse events between July 1, 2000 and July 1, 2076
July 1–2	April 19–20	February 5–7	November 24–25	September 12–13
117	119	121	123	125
July 1, 2000	April 19, 2004	February 7, 2008	November 25, 2011	September 13, 2015
127	129	131	133	135
July 2, 2019	April 20, 2023	February 6, 2027	November 25, 2030	September 12, 2034
137	139	141	143	145
July 2, 2038	April 20, 2042	February 5, 2046	November 25, 2049	September 12, 2053
147	149	151	153	155
July 1, 2057	April 20, 2061	February 5, 2065	November 24, 2068	September 12, 2072
157
July 1, 2076

=== Tritos series ===
This eclipse is a part of a tritos cycle, repeating at alternating nodes every 135 synodic months (≈ 3986.63 days, or 11 years minus 1 month). Their appearance and longitude are irregular due to a lack of synchronization with the anomalistic month (period of perigee), but groupings of 3 tritos cycles (≈ 33 years minus 3 months) come close (≈ 434.044 anomalistic months), so eclipses are similar in these groupings.

Series members between 1801 and 2200
October 9, 1809 (Saros 121)	September 7, 1820 (Saros 122)	August 7, 1831 (Saros 123)	July 8, 1842 (Saros 124)	June 6, 1853 (Saros 125)
May 6, 1864 (Saros 126)	April 6, 1875 (Saros 127)	March 5, 1886 (Saros 128)	February 1, 1897 (Saros 129)	January 3, 1908 (Saros 130)
December 3, 1918 (Saros 131)	November 1, 1929 (Saros 132)	October 1, 1940 (Saros 133)	September 1, 1951 (Saros 134)	July 31, 1962 (Saros 135)
June 30, 1973 (Saros 136)	May 30, 1984 (Saros 137)	April 29, 1995 (Saros 138)	March 29, 2006 (Saros 139)	February 26, 2017 (Saros 140)
January 26, 2028 (Saros 141)	December 26, 2038 (Saros 142)	November 25, 2049 (Saros 143)	October 24, 2060 (Saros 144)	September 23, 2071 (Saros 145)
August 24, 2082 (Saros 146)	July 23, 2093 (Saros 147)	June 22, 2104 (Saros 148)	May 24, 2115 (Saros 149)	April 22, 2126 (Saros 150)
March 21, 2137 (Saros 151)	February 19, 2148 (Saros 152)	January 19, 2159 (Saros 153)	December 18, 2169 (Saros 154)	November 17, 2180 (Saros 155)
October 18, 2191 (Saros 156)

=== Inex series ===
This eclipse is a part of the long period inex cycle, repeating at alternating nodes, every 358 synodic months (≈ 10,571.95 days, or 29 years minus 20 days). Their appearance and longitude are irregular due to a lack of synchronization with the anomalistic month (period of perigee). However, groupings of 3 inex cycles (≈ 87 years minus 2 months) comes close (≈ 1,151.02 anomalistic months), so eclipses are similar in these groupings.

Series members between 1801 and 2200
May 5, 1818 (Saros 135)	April 15, 1847 (Saros 136)	March 25, 1876 (Saros 137)
March 6, 1905 (Saros 138)	February 14, 1934 (Saros 139)	January 25, 1963 (Saros 140)
January 4, 1992 (Saros 141)	December 14, 2020 (Saros 142)	November 25, 2049 (Saros 143)
November 4, 2078 (Saros 144)	October 16, 2107 (Saros 145)	September 26, 2136 (Saros 146)
September 5, 2165 (Saros 147)	August 16, 2194 (Saros 148)	
