= Solar eclipse of January 26, 2028 =

Future annular solar eclipse

- Annular eclipse
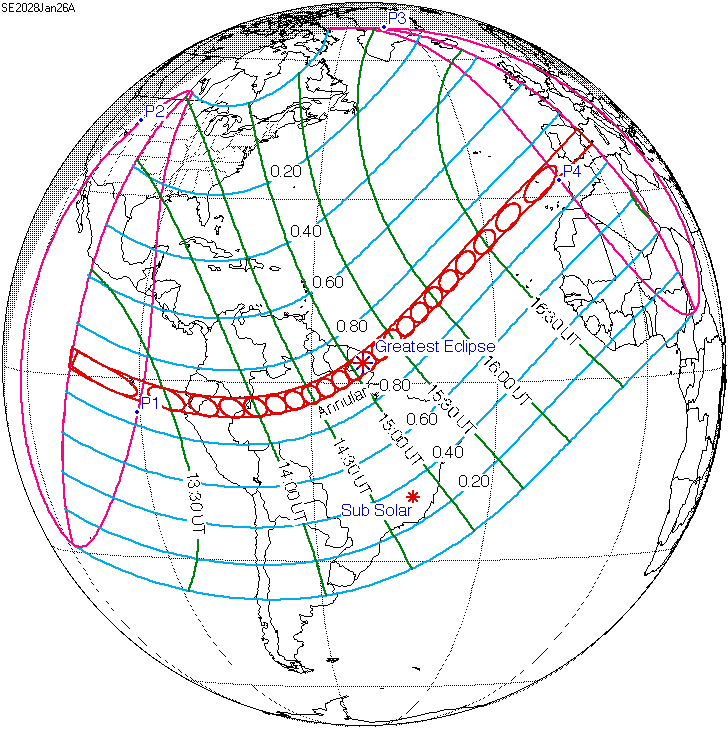
- Map
- Gamma: 0.3901
- Magnitude: 0.9208

Maximum eclipse
- Duration: 627 s (10 min 27 s)
- Coordinates: 3°N 51.5°W
- Max. width of band: 323 km (201 mi)

Times (UTC)
- Greatest eclipse: 15:08:59

References
- Saros: 141 (24 of 70)
- Catalog # (SE5000): 9569

An annular solar eclipse will occur at the Moon's ascending node of orbit on Wednesday, January 26, 2028, with a magnitude of 0.9208. A solar eclipse occurs when the Moon passes between Earth and the Sun, thereby totally or partly obscuring the image of the Sun for a viewer on Earth. An annular solar eclipse occurs when the Moon's apparent diameter is smaller than the Sun's, blocking most of the Sun's light and causing the Sun to look like an annulus (ring). An annular eclipse appears as a partial eclipse over a region of the Earth thousands of kilometres wide. Occurring about 2 days before apogee (on January 28, 2028, at 15:30 UTC), the Moon's apparent diameter will be smaller.

The path of annularity will pass through Ecuador, Peru, northern Brazil, and French Guiana. It will then travel across the Atlantic Ocean and end in southern Portugal (including the whole Madeira Islands), northern Morocco, and southern Spain. A partial eclipse will be visible over much of central and northern South America, Central America, the Caribbean, eastern North America and Western Europe, and West Africa.

== Stars and planets visible during annularity ==
The proportion of the sun which is exposed during peak annularity will produce more than enough glare to obscure all stars and almost all planets. However, Venus may be easily seen along part of the eclipse's path. It will be 39º east of the Sun, so it will lie below the eastern horizon or be low in the east for observers in South America. Observers in Spain will, weather permitting, have a much better view of Venus, which will be high in the southwest as the eclipsed Sun anticipates sunset.

== Eclipse timing ==
=== Places experiencing annular eclipse ===
Solar Eclipse of January 26, 2028 (Local Times)
Country or territory	City or place	Start of partial eclipse	Start of annular eclipse	Maximum eclipse	End of annular eclipse	End of partial eclipse	Duration of annularity (min:s)	Duration of eclipse (hr:min)	Maximum coverage
Ecuador	Galápagos Islands	06:07:45	07:22:42	07:25:29	07:28:17	09:01:43	5:35	2:56	83.34%
Peru	Piura	07:09:06	08:33:08	08:34:48	08:36:26	10:22:01	3:18	3:13	83.84%
Ecuador	Loja	07:10:16	08:33:36	08:37:55	08:42:14	10:27:56	8:38	3:18	83.90%
Ecuador	Cuenca	07:10:53	08:35:49	08:39:02	08:42:14	10:29:53	6:25	3:19	83.91%
Peru	Iquitos	07:15:05	08:45:50	08:50:09	08:54:28	10:48:20	8:38	3:33	84.21%
Brazil	Tabatinga	07:18:25	08:52:58	08:57:42	09:02:28	10:59:06	9:30	3:41	84.38%
Brazil	Tefé	08:26:20	10:08:20	10:13:19	10:18:18	12:18:31	9:58	3:52	84.61%
Brazil	Manaus	08:34:57	10:24:33	10:28:10	10:31:46	12:33:31	7:13	3:59	84.79%
Portugal	Funchal	15:19:58	16:46:43	16:50:13	16:53:44	18:08:18	7:01	2:48	83.28%
Portugal	Beja	15:32:34	16:52:51	16:55:00	16:57:11	17:47:10 (sunset)	4:20	2:15	82.84%
Portugal	Albufeira	15:32:09	16:51:44	16:55:05	16:58:27	17:50:44 (sunset)	6:43	2:19	82.87%
Spain	Huelva	16:33:30	17:52:01	17:55:36	17:59:12	18:45:10 (sunset)	7:11	2:12	82.82%
Spain	Barcelona	16:40:19	17:53:27	17:55:38	17:59:12	17:59:13 (sunset)	5:45	1:19	82.45%
Spain	Seville	16:34:28	17:52:20	17:55:58	17:59:35	18:41:03 (sunset)	7:15	2:07	82.79%
Spain	Cádiz	16:34:13	17:52:43	17:56:04	17:59:24	18:44:04 (sunset)	6:41	2:10	82.82%
Spain	Córdoba	16:35:37	17:52:40	17:56:16	17:59:52	18:35:07 (sunset)	7:12	2:00	82.74%
Morocco	Tangier	15:34:47	16:55:03	16:56:25	16:57:48	17:43:48 (sunset)	2:45	2:09	82.82%
Gibraltar	Gibraltar	16:35:15	17:54:31	17:56:32	17:58:33	18:41:07 (sunset)	4:02	2:06	82.79%
Spain	Ceuta	16:35:18	17:55:51	17:56:35	17:57:21	18:41:30 (sunset)	1:30	2:06	82.80%
Spain	Marbella	16:35:41	17:54:11	17:56:36	17:59:03	18:38:28 (sunset)	4:52	2:03	82.77%
Spain	Jaén	16:36:33	17:53:13	17:56:39	18:00:04	18:31:24 (sunset)	6:51	1:55	82.71%
Spain	Málaga	16:36:07	17:54:16	17:56:44	17:59:12	18:36:10 (sunset)	4:56	2:00	82.75%
Spain	Granada	16:36:51	17:54:13	17:56:53	17:59:33	18:31:55 (sunset)	5:20	1:55	82.71%
Spain	Valencia	16:39:06	17:53:28	17:56:59	18:00:29	18:13:57 (sunset)	7:01	1:35	82.56%
Spain	Murcia	16:38:53	17:55:03	17:57:21	17:59:40	18:20:16 (sunset)	4:37	1:41	82.61%
Spain	Villajoyosa	16:39:30	17:54:45	17:57:23	18:00:02	18:15:31 (sunset)	5:17	1:36	82.57%
Spain	Alicante	16:39:20	17:54:52	17:57:23	17:59:54	18:16:54 (sunset)	5:02	1:38	82.58%
Spain	Benidorm	16:39:34	17:54:46	17:57:24	18:00:01	18:15:04 (sunset)	5:15	1:36	82.57%
Spain	Palma	16:41:19	17:54:53	17:57:31	18:00:09	18:01:36 (sunset)	5:16	1:20	82.46%
Spain	Ibiza	16:40:40	17:55:23	17:57:34	17:59:47	18:08:00 (sunset)	4:24	1:27	82.51%

=== Places experiencing partial eclipse ===
Solar Eclipse of January 26, 2028 (Local Times)
Country or territory	City or place	Start of partial eclipse	Maximum eclipse	End of partial eclipse	Duration of eclipse (hr:min)	Maximum coverage
Mexico	Mexico City	07:12:41 (sunrise)	07:35:45	08:52:19	1:40	36.49%
Peru	Lima	07:11:42	08:37:27	10:22:24	3:11	65.02%
Guatemala	Guatemala City	06:31:13 (sunrise)	07:38:10	09:06:49	2:36	42.30%
El Salvador	San Salvador	06:24:32 (sunrise)	07:38:48	09:09:48	2:45	43.82%
Nicaragua	Managua	06:23:39	07:41:12	09:17:12	2:54	46.23%
Ecuador	Quito	07:12:58	08:42:06	10:34:30	3:22	78.57%
Costa Rica	San José	06:21:24	07:42:10	09:22:58	3:02	51.10%
Panama	Panama City	07:23:45	08:49:55	10:37:57	3:14	52.08%
Jamaica	Kingston	07:47:32	09:10:36	10:50:46	3:03	30.24%
Cuba	Havana	07:54:47	09:05:35	10:29:29	2:34	20.81%
Haiti	Port-au-Prince	07:56:20	09:25:19	11:09:39	3:13	30.02%
Bolivia	La Paz	08:21:54	09:51:54	11:37:35	3:16	50.84%
Colombia	Bogotá	07:22:36	08:57:22	10:55:34	3:33	63.86%
Venezuela	Caracas	08:44:34	10:29:09	12:29:53	3:45	50.82%
Trinidad and Tobago	Port of Spain	08:55:43	10:49:21	12:50:45	3:55	55.77%
Guyana	Georgetown	08:54:27	10:53:43	12:57:13	4:03	69.90%
Dominican Republic	Santo Domingo	09:00:24	10:33:27	12:20:24	3:19	31.25%
Barbados	Bridgetown	09:06:17	11:01:26	12:59:36	3:53	52.61%
Puerto Rico	San Juan	09:07:52	10:47:34	12:36:58	3:29	33.88%
Suriname	Paramaribo	09:59:38	12:02:08	14:04:13	4:05	77.22%
Brazil	Belém	10:05:44	12:07:33	14:03:42	3:58	73.70%
French Guiana	Cayenne	10:05:16	12:09:39	14:09:40	4:04	83.93%
Belgium	Brussels	16:37:53	17:13:08	17:22:48 (sunset)	0:45	29.27%
Cape Verde	Praia	13:52:59	15:31:51	16:55:13	3:02	56.73%
France	Paris	16:37:50	17:33:51	17:37:35 (sunset)	1:00	53.97%
United Kingdom	London	15:35:59	16:34:20	16:38:21 (sunset)	1:02	50.38%
Mauritania	Nouakchott	15:15:32	16:44:02	17:59:34	2:44	50.48%
Ireland	Dublin	15:33:07	16:45:15	16:55:50 (sunset)	1:23	46.60%
Jersey	Saint Helier	15:35:40	16:50:22	16:54:22 (sunset)	1:19	60.97%
Western Sahara	Laayoune	15:23:57	16:51:51	18:07:34	2:44	70.94%
Portugal	Lisbon	15:31:18	16:54:12	17:50:43 (sunset)	2:19	81.28%
Andorra	Andorra la Vella	16:39:30	17:55:38	17:59:03 (sunset)	1:20	82.06%
Spain	Madrid	16:36:13	17:55:39	18:25:04 (sunset)	1:49	82.41%
Morocco	Casablanca	15:32:51	16:55:56	17:55:18 (sunset)	2:22	80.57%
Algeria	Algiers	16:42:47	17:58:37	18:06:09 (sunset)	1:23	77.10%

== Eclipse details ==
Shown below are two tables displaying details about this particular solar eclipse. The first table outlines times at which the Moon's penumbra or umbra attains the specific parameter, and the second table describes various other parameters pertaining to this eclipse.

January 26, 2028 Solar Eclipse Times
Event	Time (UTC)
First Penumbral External Contact	2028 January 26 at 12:07:52.6 UTC
First Umbral External Contact	2028 January 26 at 13:16:03.3 UTC
First Central Line	2028 January 26 at 13:19:37.5 UTC
First Umbral Internal Contact	2028 January 26 at 13:23:12.8 UTC
First Penumbral Internal Contact	2028 January 26 at 14:49:10.7 UTC
Greatest Duration	2028 January 26 at 14:54:20.6 UTC
Greatest Eclipse	2028 January 26 at 15:08:58.8 UTC
Ecliptic Conjunction	2028 January 26 at 15:13:40.4 UTC
Equatorial Conjunction	2028 January 26 at 15:25:58.3 UTC
Last Penumbral Internal Contact	2028 January 26 at 15:28:20.7 UTC
Last Umbral Internal Contact	2028 January 26 at 16:54:32.7 UTC
Last Central Line	2028 January 26 at 16:58:09.5 UTC
Last Umbral External Contact	2028 January 26 at 17:01:45.1 UTC
Last Penumbral External Contact	2028 January 26 at 18:10:00.6 UTC

January 26, 2028 Solar Eclipse Parameters
Parameter	Value
Eclipse Magnitude	0.92080
Eclipse Obscuration	0.84787
Gamma	0.39014
Sun Right Ascension	20h34m14.2s
Sun Declination	-18°43'33.0"
Sun Semi-Diameter	16'14.6"
Sun Equatorial Horizontal Parallax	08.9"
Moon Right Ascension	20h33m43.7s
Moon Declination	-18°23'46.3"
Moon Semi-Diameter	14'45.1"
Moon Equatorial Horizontal Parallax	0°54'08.3"
ΔT	73.0 s

== Eclipse season ==
This eclipse is part of an eclipse season, a period, roughly every six months, when eclipses occur. Only two (or occasionally three) eclipse seasons occur each year, and each season lasts about 35 days and repeats just short of six months (173 days) later; thus two full eclipse seasons always occur each year. Either two or three eclipses happen each eclipse season. In the sequence below, each eclipse is separated by a fortnight.

Eclipse season of January 2028
January 12 Descending node (full moon)	January 26 Ascending node (new moon)
Partial lunar eclipse Lunar Saros 115	Annular solar eclipse Solar Saros 141

== Related eclipses ==
=== Eclipses in 2028 ===
- A partial lunar eclipse on January 12.
- An annular solar eclipse on January 26.
- A partial lunar eclipse on July 6.
- A total solar eclipse on July 22.
- A total lunar eclipse on December 31.

=== Metonic ===
- Preceded by: Solar eclipse of April 8, 2024
- Followed by: Solar eclipse of November 14, 2031

=== Tzolkinex ===
- Preceded by: Solar eclipse of December 14, 2020
- Followed by: Solar eclipse of March 9, 2035

=== Half-Saros ===
- Preceded by: Lunar eclipse of January 21, 2019
- Followed by: Lunar eclipse of January 31, 2037

=== Tritos ===
- Preceded by: Solar eclipse of February 26, 2017
- Followed by: Solar eclipse of December 26, 2038

=== Solar Saros 141 ===
- Preceded by: Solar eclipse of January 15, 2010
- Followed by: Solar eclipse of February 5, 2046

=== Inex ===
- Preceded by: Solar eclipse of February 16, 1999
- Followed by: Solar eclipse of January 5, 2057

=== Triad ===
- Preceded by: Solar eclipse of March 27, 1941
- Followed by: Solar eclipse of November 27, 2114

=== Solar eclipses of 2026–2029 ===
This eclipse is a member of a semester series. An eclipse in a semester series of solar eclipses repeats approximately every 177 days and 4 hours (a semester) at alternating nodes of the Moon's orbit.

The partial solar eclipses on June 12, 2029 and December 5, 2029 occur in the next lunar year eclipse set.

Solar eclipse series sets from 2026 to 2029
Ascending node			Descending node		
Saros	Map	Gamma	Saros	Map	Gamma
121	February 17, 2026 Annular	−0.97427	126	August 12, 2026 Total	0.89774
131	February 6, 2027 Annular	−0.29515	136	August 2, 2027 Total	0.14209
141	January 26, 2028 Annular	0.39014	146	July 22, 2028 Total	−0.60557
151	January 14, 2029 Partial	1.05532	156	July 11, 2029 Partial	−1.41908

=== Saros 141 ===
This eclipse is a part of Saros series 141, repeating every 18 years, 11 days, and containing 70 events. The series started with a partial solar eclipse on May 19, 1613. It contains annular eclipses from August 4, 1739 through October 14, 2640. There are no hybrid or total eclipses in this set. The series ends at member 70 as a partial eclipse on June 13, 2857. Its eclipses are tabulated in three columns; every third eclipse in the same column is one exeligmos apart, so they all cast shadows over approximately the same parts of the Earth.

The longest duration of annularity was produced by member 20 at 12 minutes, 9 seconds on December 14, 1955. All eclipses in this series occur at the Moon’s ascending node of orbit.

Series members 12–33 occur between 1801 and 2200:
12	13	14
September 17, 1811	September 28, 1829	October 9, 1847
15	16	17
October 19, 1865	October 30, 1883	November 11, 1901
18	19	20
November 22, 1919	December 2, 1937	December 14, 1955
21	22	23
December 24, 1973	January 4, 1992	January 15, 2010
24	25	26
January 26, 2028	February 5, 2046	February 17, 2064
27	28	29
February 27, 2082	March 10, 2100	March 22, 2118
30	31	32
April 1, 2136	April 12, 2154	April 23, 2172
33
May 4, 2190

=== Metonic series ===
The metonic series repeats eclipses every 19 years (6939.69 days), lasting about 5 cycles. Eclipses occur in nearly the same calendar date. In addition, the octon subseries repeats 1/5 of that or every 3.8 years (1387.94 days). All eclipses in this table occur at the Moon's ascending node.

21 eclipse events between June 21, 1982 and June 21, 2058
June 21	April 8–9	January 26	November 13–14	September 1–2
117	119	121	123	125
June 21, 1982	April 9, 1986	January 26, 1990	November 13, 1993	September 2, 1997
127	129	131	133	135
June 21, 2001	April 8, 2005	January 26, 2009	November 13, 2012	September 1, 2016
137	139	141	143	145
June 21, 2020	April 8, 2024	January 26, 2028	November 14, 2031	September 2, 2035
147	149	151	153	155
June 21, 2039	April 9, 2043	January 26, 2047	November 14, 2050	September 2, 2054
157
June 21, 2058

=== Tritos series ===
This eclipse is a part of a tritos cycle, repeating at alternating nodes every 135 synodic months (≈ 3986.63 days, or 11 years minus 1 month). Their appearance and longitude are irregular due to a lack of synchronization with the anomalistic month (period of perigee), but groupings of 3 tritos cycles (≈ 33 years minus 3 months) come close (≈ 434.044 anomalistic months), so eclipses are similar in these groupings.

Series members between 1801 and 2200
October 9, 1809 (Saros 121)	September 7, 1820 (Saros 122)	August 7, 1831 (Saros 123)	July 8, 1842 (Saros 124)	June 6, 1853 (Saros 125)
May 6, 1864 (Saros 126)	April 6, 1875 (Saros 127)	March 5, 1886 (Saros 128)	February 1, 1897 (Saros 129)	January 3, 1908 (Saros 130)
December 3, 1918 (Saros 131)	November 1, 1929 (Saros 132)	October 1, 1940 (Saros 133)	September 1, 1951 (Saros 134)	July 31, 1962 (Saros 135)
June 30, 1973 (Saros 136)	May 30, 1984 (Saros 137)	April 29, 1995 (Saros 138)	March 29, 2006 (Saros 139)	February 26, 2017 (Saros 140)
January 26, 2028 (Saros 141)	December 26, 2038 (Saros 142)	November 25, 2049 (Saros 143)	October 24, 2060 (Saros 144)	September 23, 2071 (Saros 145)
August 24, 2082 (Saros 146)	July 23, 2093 (Saros 147)	June 22, 2104 (Saros 148)	May 24, 2115 (Saros 149)	April 22, 2126 (Saros 150)
March 21, 2137 (Saros 151)	February 19, 2148 (Saros 152)	January 19, 2159 (Saros 153)	December 18, 2169 (Saros 154)	November 17, 2180 (Saros 155)
October 18, 2191 (Saros 156)

=== Inex series ===
This eclipse is a part of the long period inex cycle, repeating at alternating nodes, every 358 synodic months (≈ 10,571.95 days, or 29 years minus 20 days). Their appearance and longitude are irregular due to a lack of synchronization with the anomalistic month (period of perigee). However, groupings of 3 inex cycles (≈ 87 years minus 2 months) comes close (≈ 1,151.02 anomalistic months), so eclipses are similar in these groupings.

Series members between 1801 and 2200
June 16, 1825 (Saros 134)	May 26, 1854 (Saros 135)	May 6, 1883 (Saros 136)
April 17, 1912 (Saros 137)	March 27, 1941 (Saros 138)	March 7, 1970 (Saros 139)
February 16, 1999 (Saros 140)	January 26, 2028 (Saros 141)	January 5, 2057 (Saros 142)
December 16, 2085 (Saros 143)	November 27, 2114 (Saros 144)	November 7, 2143 (Saros 145)
October 17, 2172 (Saros 146)		
