= Facundo, Chubut =

Coordinates: 45°17′S 69°57′W

Facundo (Chubut)
- Municipality and village
- Interactive map of Facundo (Chubut)
- Country: Argentina
- Province: Chubut Province
- Time zone: UTC−3 (ART)

Facundo (Chubut) is a village and municipality in Chubut Province in southern Argentina.
