= May 2013 lunar eclipse =

Short penumbral

- Penumbral eclipse
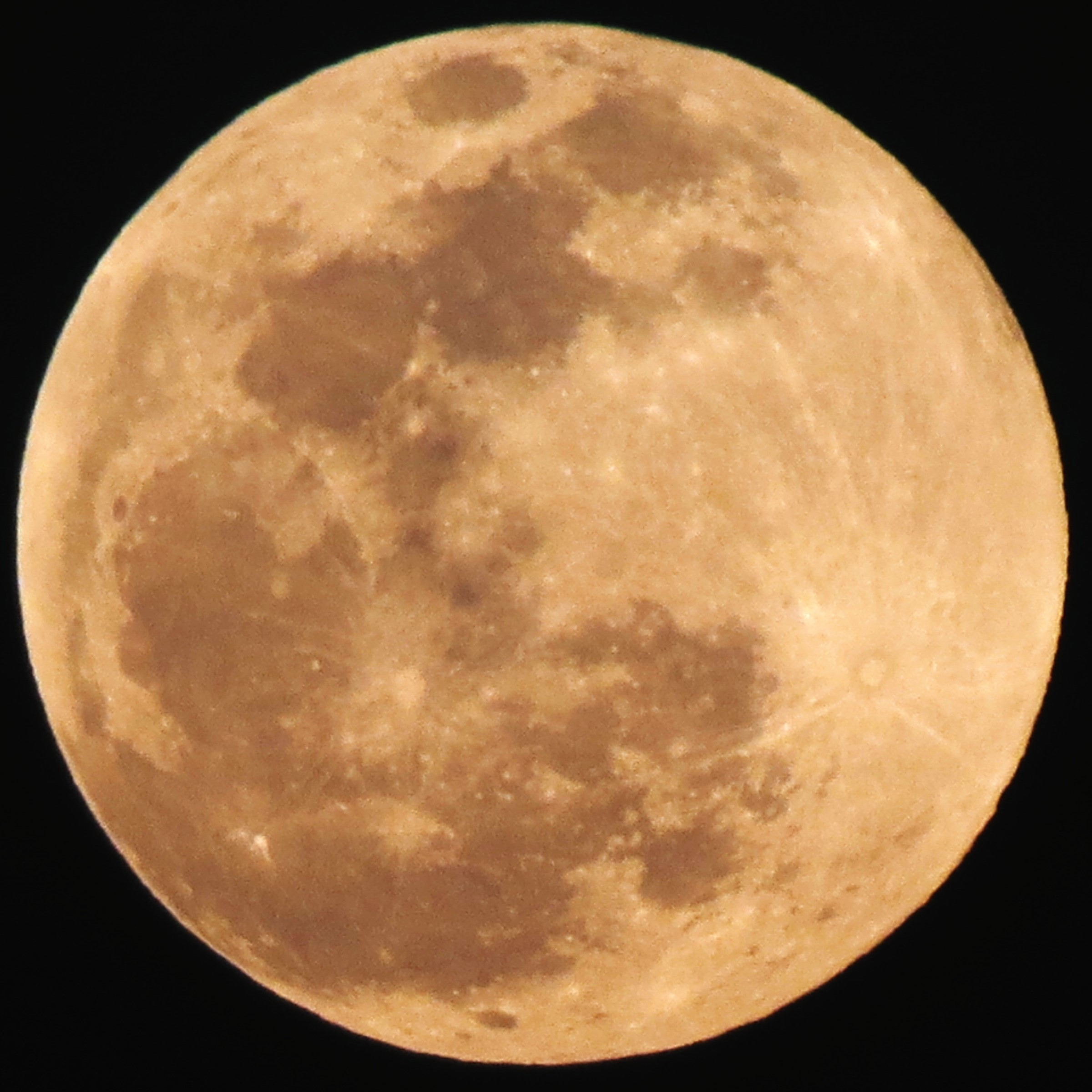
- Date: May 25, 2013
- Gamma: 1.5350
- Magnitude: −0.9322
- Saros cycle: 150 (1 of 71)
- Penumbral: 33 minutes, 34 seconds
Contacts (UTC)
- P1: 3:53:15
- Greatest: 4:09:58
- P4: 4:26:49

A penumbral lunar eclipse occurred at the Moon’s ascending node of orbit on Saturday, May 25, 2013, with an umbral magnitude of −0.9322. A lunar eclipse occurs when the Moon moves into the Earth's shadow, causing the Moon to be darkened. A penumbral lunar eclipse occurs when part or all of the Moon's near side passes into the Earth's penumbra. Unlike a solar eclipse, which can only be viewed from a relatively small area of the world, a lunar eclipse may be viewed from anywhere on the night side of Earth. Occurring only about 18 hours before perigee (on May 25, 2013, at 21:40 UTC), the Moon's apparent diameter was larger.

This eclipse was visually imperceptible due to the small entry into the penumbral shadow. It also marked the beginning of Saros series 150.

== Visibility ==
The eclipse was completely visible over much of North and South America, west Africa, and western Europe, seen rising over the central Pacific Ocean and western Canada and setting over central Europe and central Africa.

Hourly motion shown right to left	The Moon's hourly motion across the Earth's shadow in the constellation of Scorpius.
Visibility map

== Images ==
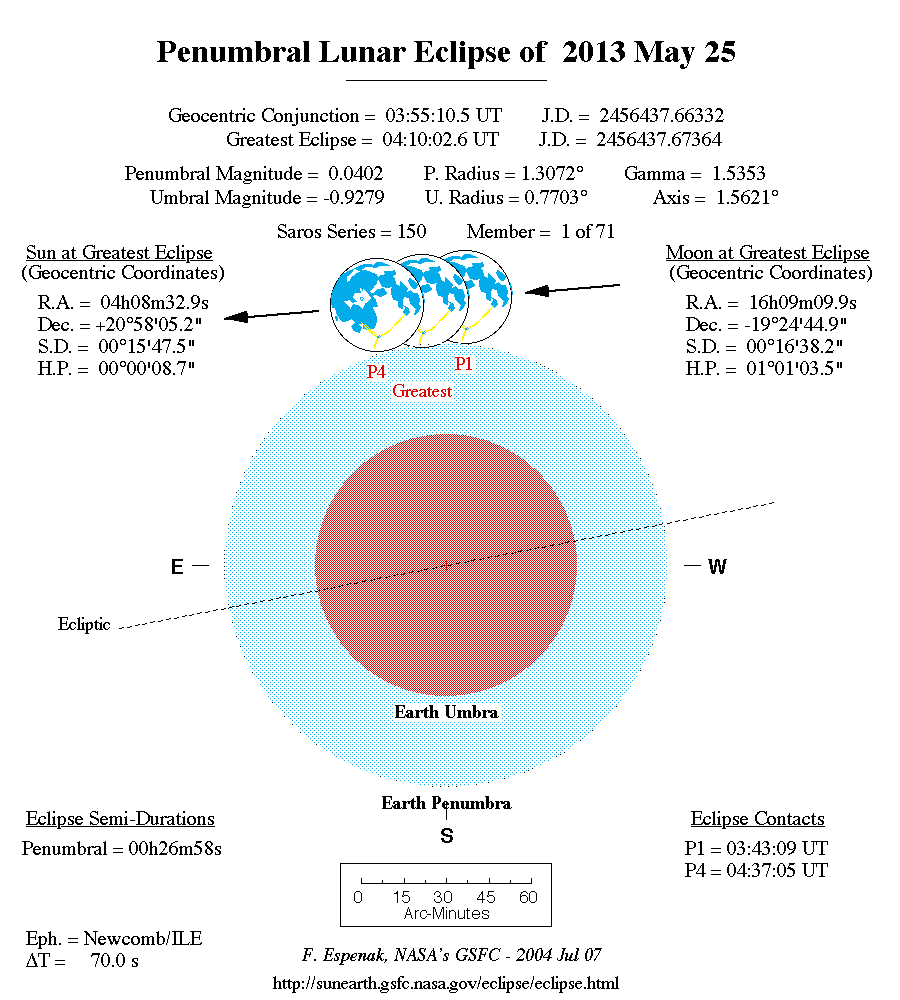
NASA chart of the eclipse

== Gallery ==
Animation of the eclipse viewed from South pole of the Moon

== Eclipse details ==
Shown below is a table displaying details about this particular solar eclipse. It describes various parameters pertaining to this eclipse.

May 25, 2013 Lunar Eclipse Parameters
Parameter	Value
Penumbral Magnitude	0.01702
Umbral Magnitude	−0.93215
Gamma	1.53512
Sun Right Ascension	04h08m32.9s
Sun Declination	+20°58'05.1"
Sun Semi-Diameter	15'47.5"
Sun Equatorial Horizontal Parallax	08.7"
Moon Right Ascension	16h09m09.9s
Moon Declination	-19°24'45.3"
Moon Semi-Diameter	16'38.2"
Moon Equatorial Horizontal Parallax	1°01'03.5"
ΔT	67.1 s

== Eclipse season ==
This eclipse is part of an eclipse season, a period, roughly every six months, when eclipses occur. Only two (or occasionally three) eclipse seasons occur each year, and each season lasts about 35 days and repeats just short of six months (173 days) later; thus two full eclipse seasons always occur each year. Either two or three eclipses happen each eclipse season. In the sequence below, each eclipse is separated by a fortnight. The first and last eclipse in this sequence is separated by one synodic month.

Eclipse season of April–May 2013
April 25 Ascending node (full moon)	May 10 Descending node (new moon)	May 25 Ascending node (full moon)
Partial lunar eclipse Lunar Saros 112	Annular solar eclipse Solar Saros 138	Penumbral lunar eclipse Lunar Saros 150

== Related eclipses ==
=== Eclipses in 2013 ===
- A partial lunar eclipse on April 25.
- An annular solar eclipse on May 10.
- A penumbral lunar eclipse on May 25.
- A penumbral lunar eclipse on October 18.
- A hybrid solar eclipse on November 3.

=== Metonic ===
- Preceded by: Lunar eclipse of August 6, 2009

=== Tzolkinex ===
- Followed by: Lunar eclipse of July 5, 2020

=== Tritos ===
- Preceded by: Lunar eclipse of June 24, 2002

=== Lunar Saros 150 ===
- Followed by: Lunar eclipse of June 5, 2031

=== Inex ===
- Preceded by: Lunar eclipse of June 13, 1984

=== Triad ===
- Preceded by: Lunar eclipse of July 25, 1926

=== Lunar eclipses of 2009–2013 ===
This eclipse is a member of a semester series. An eclipse in a semester series of lunar eclipses repeats approximately every 177 days and 4 hours (a semester) at alternating nodes of the Moon's orbit.

The penumbral lunar eclipses on February 9, 2009 and August 6, 2009 occur in the previous lunar year eclipse set, and the lunar eclipses on April 25, 2013 (partial) and October 18, 2013 (penumbral) occur in the next lunar year eclipse set.

Lunar eclipse series sets from 2009 to 2013
Ascending node				Descending node			
Saros	Date Viewing	Type Chart	Gamma	Saros	Date Viewing	Type Chart	Gamma
110	2009 Jul 07	Penumbral	−1.4916	115	2009 Dec 31	Partial	0.9766
120	2010 Jun 26	Partial	−0.7091	125	2010 Dec 21	Total	0.3214
130	2011 Jun 15	Total	0.0897	135	2011 Dec 10	Total	−0.3882
140	2012 Jun 04	Partial	0.8248	145	2012 Nov 28	Penumbral	−1.0869
150	2013 May 25	Penumbral	1.5351				

=== Saros 150 ===
This eclipse is a part of Saros series 150, repeating every 18 years, 11 days, and containing 71 events. The series started with a penumbral lunar eclipse on May 25, 2013. It contains partial eclipses from August 20, 2157 through April 19, 2554; total eclipses from April 29, 2572 through August 28, 2770; and a second set of partial eclipses from September 7, 2788 through February 8, 3041. The series ends at member 71 as a penumbral eclipse on June 30, 3275.

The longest duration of totality will be produced by member 36 at 105 minutes, 16 seconds on July 4, 2680. All eclipses in this series occur at the Moon’s ascending node of orbit.

Greatest	First			
The greatest eclipse of the series will occur on 2680 Jul 04, lasting 105 minutes, 16 seconds.	Penumbral	Partial	Total	Central
The greatest eclipse of the series will occur on 2680 Jul 04, lasting 105 minutes, 16 seconds.	2013 May 25	2157 Aug 20	2572 Apr 29	2626 Jun 02
The greatest eclipse of the series will occur on 2680 Jul 04, lasting 105 minutes, 16 seconds.	Last			
The greatest eclipse of the series will occur on 2680 Jul 04, lasting 105 minutes, 16 seconds.	Central	Total	Partial	Penumbral
The greatest eclipse of the series will occur on 2680 Jul 04, lasting 105 minutes, 16 seconds.	2734 Aug 07	2770 Aug 28	3041 Feb 08	3275 Jun 30

Eclipses are tabulated in three columns; every third eclipse in the same column is one exeligmos apart, so they all cast shadows over approximately the same parts of the Earth.

Series members 1–11 occur between 2013 and 2200:
1	2	3
2013 May 25	2031 Jun 05	2049 Jun 15
4	5	6
2067 Jun 27	2085 Jul 07	2103 Jul 19
7	8	9
2121 Jul 30	2139 Aug 10	2157 Aug 20
10	11	
2175 Aug 31	2193 Sep 11	

=== Tritos series ===
This eclipse is a part of a tritos cycle, repeating at alternating nodes every 135 synodic months (≈ 3986.63 days, or 11 years minus 1 month). Their appearance and longitude are irregular due to a lack of synchronization with the anomalistic month (period of perigee), but groupings of 3 tritos cycles (≈ 33 years minus 3 months) come close (≈ 434.044 anomalistic months), so eclipses are similar in these groupings.

Series members between 1801 and 2078
1806 Jan 05 (Saros 131)	1816 Dec 04 (Saros 132)	1827 Nov 03 (Saros 133)	1838 Oct 03 (Saros 134)	1849 Sep 02 (Saros 135)
1860 Aug 01 (Saros 136)	1871 Jul 02 (Saros 137)	1882 Jun 01 (Saros 138)	1893 Apr 30 (Saros 139)	1904 Mar 31 (Saros 140)
1915 Mar 01 (Saros 141)	1926 Jan 28 (Saros 142)	1936 Dec 28 (Saros 143)	1947 Nov 28 (Saros 144)	1958 Oct 27 (Saros 145)
1969 Sep 25 (Saros 146)	1980 Aug 26 (Saros 147)	1991 Jul 26 (Saros 148)	2002 Jun 24 (Saros 149)	2013 May 25 (Saros 150)
2078 Nov 19 (Saros 156)

=== Inex series ===
This eclipse is a part of the long period inex cycle, repeating at alternating nodes, every 358 synodic months (≈ 10,571.95 days, or 29 years minus 20 days). Their appearance and longitude are irregular due to a lack of synchronization with the anomalistic month (period of perigee). However, groupings of 3 inex cycles (≈ 87 years minus 2 months) comes close (≈ 1,151.02 anomalistic months), so eclipses are similar in these groupings.

Series members between 1801 and 2200
1810 Oct 12 (Saros 143)	1839 Sep 23 (Saros 144)	1868 Sep 02 (Saros 145)
1897 Aug 12 (Saros 146)	1926 Jul 25 (Saros 147)	
1984 Jun 13 (Saros 149)	2013 May 25 (Saros 150)	
	2187 Jan 24 (Saros 156)	

== See also ==
- List of lunar eclipses and List of 21st-century lunar eclipses
- File:Penumbral eclipse of May 25, 2013 from lunar south pole.gif Animation of Earth as seen from lunar south pole during the eclipse.
