= June 2049 lunar eclipse =

Astronomical event

- Penumbral eclipse
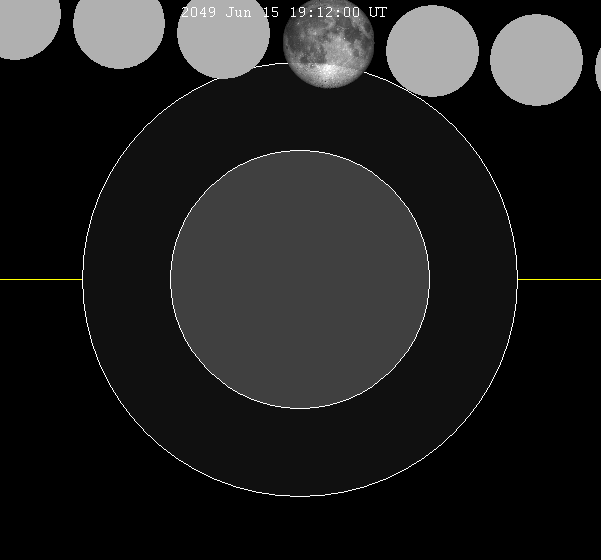
- The Moon's hourly motion shown right to left
- Date: June 15, 2049
- Gamma: 1.4068
- Magnitude: −0.6970
- Saros cycle: 150 (3 of 71)
- Penumbral: 131 minutes, 58 seconds
Contacts (UTC)
- P1: 18:06:44
- Greatest: 19:12:40
- P4: 20:18:43

A penumbral lunar eclipse will occur at the Moon’s ascending node of orbit on Tuesday, June 15, 2049, with an umbral magnitude of −0.6970. A lunar eclipse occurs when the Moon moves into the Earth's shadow, causing the Moon to be darkened. A penumbral lunar eclipse occurs when part or all of the Moon's near side passes into the Earth's penumbra. Unlike a solar eclipse, which can only be viewed from a relatively small area of the world, a lunar eclipse may be viewed from anywhere on the night side of Earth. Occurring only about 23.5 hours before perigee (on June 16, 2049, at 18:40 UTC), the Moon's apparent diameter will be larger.

== Visibility ==
The eclipse will be completely visible over central and east Africa, eastern Europe, much of Asia, Australia, and Antarctica, seen rising over west Africa and western Europe and setting over northeast Asia and the western Pacific Ocean.

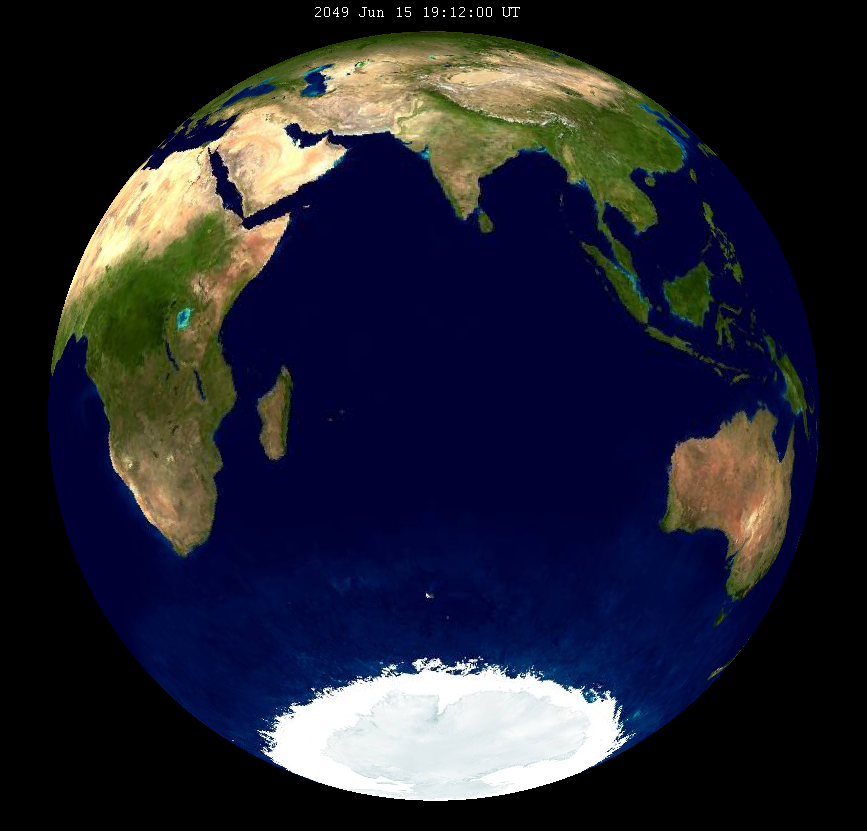
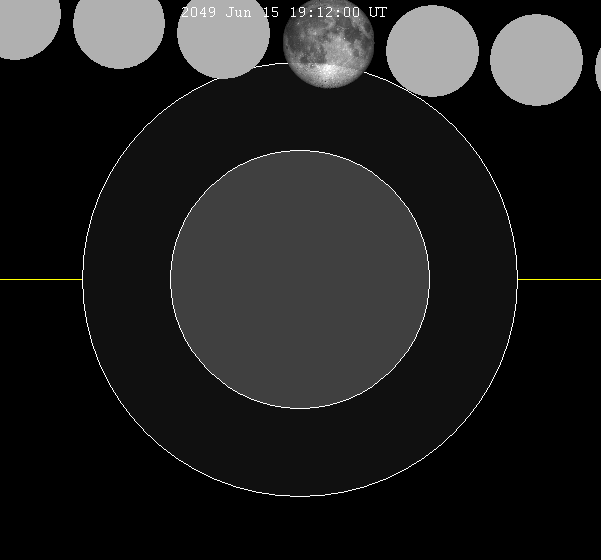

== Eclipse details ==
Shown below is a table displaying details about this particular solar eclipse. It describes various parameters pertaining to this eclipse.

June 15, 2049 Lunar Eclipse Parameters
Parameter	Value
Penumbral Magnitude	0.25260
Umbral Magnitude	−0.69700
Gamma	1.40692
Sun Right Ascension	05h38m45.5s
Sun Declination	+23°20'31.0"
Sun Semi-Diameter	15'44.8"
Sun Equatorial Horizontal Parallax	08.7"
Moon Right Ascension	17h38m24.2s
Moon Declination	-21°55'02.3"
Moon Semi-Diameter	16'34.9"
Moon Equatorial Horizontal Parallax	1°00'51.4"
ΔT	84.8 s

== Eclipse season ==
This eclipse is part of an eclipse season, a period, roughly every six months, when eclipses occur. Only two (or occasionally three) eclipse seasons occur each year, and each season lasts about 35 days and repeats just short of six months (173 days) later; thus two full eclipse seasons always occur each year. Either two or three eclipses happen each eclipse season. In the sequence below, each eclipse is separated by a fortnight. The first and last eclipse in this sequence is separated by one synodic month.

Eclipse season of May–June 2049
May 17 Ascending node (full moon)	May 31 Descending node (new moon)	June 15 Ascending node (full moon)
Penumbral lunar eclipse Lunar Saros 112	Annular solar eclipse Solar Saros 138	Penumbral lunar eclipse Lunar Saros 150

== Related eclipses ==
=== Eclipses in 2049 ===
- A penumbral lunar eclipse on May 17.
- An annular solar eclipse on May 31.
- A penumbral lunar eclipse on June 15.
- A penumbral lunar eclipse on November 9.
- A hybrid solar eclipse on November 25.

=== Metonic ===
- Preceded by: Lunar eclipse of August 27, 2045

=== Tzolkinex ===
- Followed by: Lunar eclipse of July 26, 2056

=== Half-Saros ===
- Followed by: Solar eclipse of June 21, 2058

=== Tritos ===
- Preceded by: Lunar eclipse of July 16, 2038

=== Lunar Saros 150 ===
- Preceded by: Lunar eclipse of June 5, 2031
- Followed by: Lunar eclipse of June 27, 2067

=== Inex ===
- Preceded by: Lunar eclipse of July 5, 2020

=== Triad ===
- Preceded by: Lunar eclipse of August 15, 1962
- Followed by: Lunar eclipse of April 16, 2136

=== Lunar eclipses of 2049–2052 ===
This eclipse is a member of a semester series. An eclipse in a semester series of lunar eclipses repeats approximately every 177 days and 4 hours (a semester) at alternating nodes of the Moon's orbit.

The penumbral lunar eclipses on May 17, 2049 and November 9, 2049 occur in the next lunar year eclipse set.

Lunar eclipse series sets from 2046 to 2049
Descending node				Ascending node			
Saros	Date Viewing	Type Chart	Gamma	Saros	Date Viewing	Type Chart	Gamma
115	2046 Jan 22	Partial	0.9885	120	2046 Jul 18	Partial	−0.8691
125	2047 Jan 12	Total	0.3317	130	2047 Jul 07	Total	−0.0636
135	2048 Jan 01	Total	−0.3745	140	2048 Jun 26	Partial	0.6796
145	2048 Dec 20	Penumbral	−1.0624	150	2049 Jun 15	Penumbral	1.4068

=== Saros 150 ===
This eclipse is a part of Saros series 150, repeating every 18 years, 11 days, and containing 71 events. The series started with a penumbral lunar eclipse on May 25, 2013. It contains partial eclipses from August 20, 2157 through April 19, 2554; total eclipses from April 29, 2572 through August 28, 2770; and a second set of partial eclipses from September 7, 2788 through February 8, 3041. The series ends at member 71 as a penumbral eclipse on June 30, 3275.

The longest duration of totality will be produced by member 36 at 105 minutes, 16 seconds on July 4, 2680. All eclipses in this series occur at the Moon’s ascending node of orbit.

Greatest	First			
The greatest eclipse of the series will occur on 2680 Jul 04, lasting 105 minutes, 16 seconds.	Penumbral	Partial	Total	Central
The greatest eclipse of the series will occur on 2680 Jul 04, lasting 105 minutes, 16 seconds.	2013 May 25	2157 Aug 20	2572 Apr 29	2626 Jun 02
The greatest eclipse of the series will occur on 2680 Jul 04, lasting 105 minutes, 16 seconds.	Last			
The greatest eclipse of the series will occur on 2680 Jul 04, lasting 105 minutes, 16 seconds.	Central	Total	Partial	Penumbral
The greatest eclipse of the series will occur on 2680 Jul 04, lasting 105 minutes, 16 seconds.	2734 Aug 07	2770 Aug 28	3041 Feb 08	3275 Jun 30

Eclipses are tabulated in three columns; every third eclipse in the same column is one exeligmos apart, so they all cast shadows over approximately the same parts of the Earth.

Series members 1–11 occur between 2013 and 2200:
1	2	3
2013 May 25	2031 Jun 05	2049 Jun 15
4	5	6
2067 Jun 27	2085 Jul 07	2103 Jul 19
7	8	9
2121 Jul 30	2139 Aug 10	2157 Aug 20
10	11	
2175 Aug 31	2193 Sep 11	

=== Tritos series ===
This eclipse is a part of a tritos cycle, repeating at alternating nodes every 135 synodic months (≈ 3986.63 days, or 11 years minus 1 month). Their appearance and longitude are irregular due to a lack of synchronization with the anomalistic month (period of perigee), but groupings of 3 tritos cycles (≈ 33 years minus 3 months) come close (≈ 434.044 anomalistic months), so eclipses are similar in these groupings.

Series members between 1801 and 2147
1809 Apr 30 (Saros 128)	1820 Mar 29 (Saros 129)	1831 Feb 26 (Saros 130)	1842 Jan 26 (Saros 131)	1852 Dec 26 (Saros 132)
1863 Nov 25 (Saros 133)	1874 Oct 25 (Saros 134)	1885 Sep 24 (Saros 135)	1896 Aug 23 (Saros 136)	1907 Jul 25 (Saros 137)
1918 Jun 24 (Saros 138)	1929 May 23 (Saros 139)	1940 Apr 22 (Saros 140)	1951 Mar 23 (Saros 141)	1962 Feb 19 (Saros 142)
1973 Jan 18 (Saros 143)	1983 Dec 20 (Saros 144)	1994 Nov 18 (Saros 145)	2005 Oct 17 (Saros 146)	2016 Sep 16 (Saros 147)
2027 Aug 17 (Saros 148)	2038 Jul 16 (Saros 149)	2049 Jun 15 (Saros 150)		
			2114 Dec 12 (Saros 156)	
	2147 Sep 09 (Saros 159)			

=== Inex series ===
This eclipse is a part of the long period inex cycle, repeating at alternating nodes, every 358 synodic months (≈ 10,571.95 days, or 29 years minus 20 days). Their appearance and longitude are irregular due to a lack of synchronization with the anomalistic month (period of perigee). However, groupings of 3 inex cycles (≈ 87 years minus 2 months) comes close (≈ 1,151.02 anomalistic months), so eclipses are similar in these groupings.

Series members between 1801 and 2200
1817 Nov 23 (Saros 142)	1846 Nov 03 (Saros 143)	1875 Oct 14 (Saros 144)
1904 Sep 24 (Saros 145)	1933 Sep 04 (Saros 146)	1962 Aug 15 (Saros 147)
1991 Jul 26 (Saros 148)	2020 Jul 05 (Saros 149)	2049 Jun 15 (Saros 150)
	2107 May 07 (Saros 152)	2136 Apr 16 (Saros 153)
	2194 Mar 07 (Saros 155)	

=== Half-Saros cycle ===
A lunar eclipse will be preceded and followed by solar eclipses by 9 years and 5.5 days (a half saros). This lunar eclipse is related to one partial solar eclipse of Solar Saros 157.

June 21, 2058
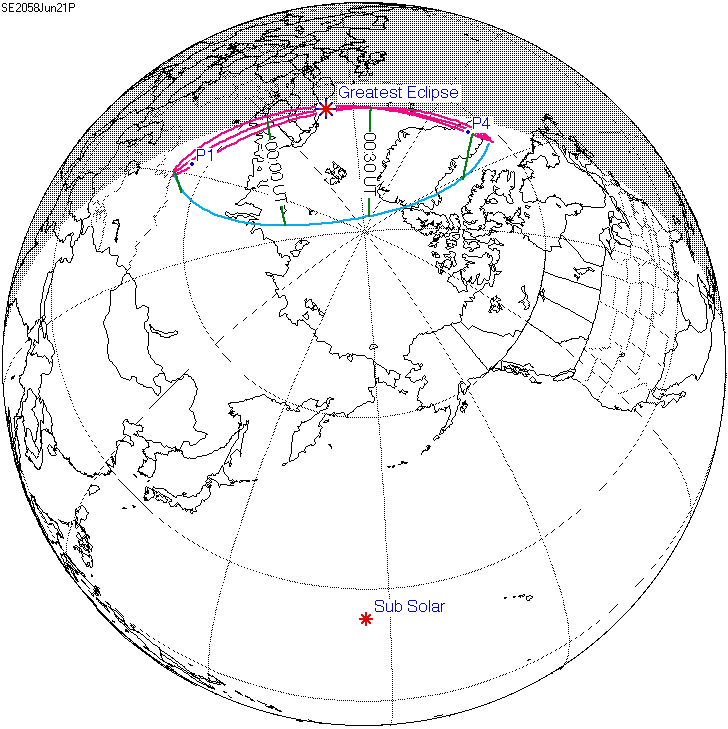

== See also ==
- List of lunar eclipses and List of 21st-century lunar eclipses
