= Solar eclipse of May 31, 2049 =

Future annular solar eclipse

- Annular eclipse
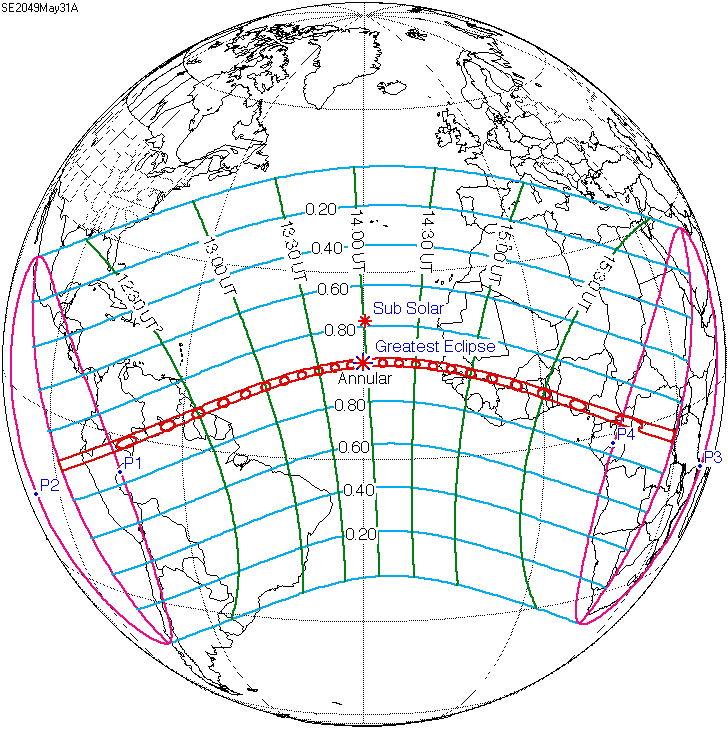
- Map
- Gamma: −0.1187
- Magnitude: 0.9631

Maximum eclipse
- Duration: 285 s (4 min 45 s)
- Coordinates: 15.3°N 29.9°W
- Max. width of band: 134 km (83 mi)

Times (UTC)
- Greatest eclipse: 13:59:59

References
- Saros: 138 (33 of 70)
- Catalog # (SE5000): 9617

An annular solar eclipse will occur at the Moon's descending node of orbit on Monday, May 31, 2049, with a magnitude of 0.9631. A solar eclipse occurs when the Moon passes between Earth and the Sun, thereby totally or partly obscuring the image of the Sun for a viewer on Earth. An annular solar eclipse occurs when the Moon's apparent diameter is smaller than the Sun's, blocking most of the Sun's light and causing the Sun to look like an annulus (ring). An annular eclipse appears as a partial eclipse over a region of the Earth thousands of kilometres wide. Occurring about 4.1 days before apogee (on June 4, 2049, at 15:40 UTC), the Moon's apparent diameter will be smaller.

The path of annularity will be visible from parts of Peru, southern Ecuador, southern Colombia, northern Brazil, southern Venezuela, Guyana, northern Suriname, Cape Verde, Senegal, Gambia, southwestern Mali, northern Guinea, southwestern Burkina Faso, northeastern Côte d'Ivoire, Ghana, Togo, Benin, southern Nigeria, Cameroon, extreme northern Gabon, northern Congo, the Democratic Republic of the Congo, Burundi, and western Tanzania. A partial solar eclipse will also be visible for parts of Central America, the Caribbean, northern and central South America, the Southeastern United States, Africa, Southern Europe, and the Middle East.

== Images ==
Animated path

== Eclipse timing ==
=== Places experiencing annular eclipse ===
Solar eclipse of May 31, 2049 (local times)
Country or territory	City or place	Start of partial eclipse	Start of annular eclipse	Maximum eclipse	End of annular eclipse	End of partial eclipse	Duration of annularity (min:s)	Duration of eclipse (hr:min)	Maximum coverage
Guyana	Linden	07:06:08	08:28:43	08:29:16	08:29:48	10:13:24	1:05	3:07	91.91%
Guyana	New Amsterdam	07:06:43	08:29:22	08:30:39	08:31:56	10:15:58	2:34	3:09	91.95%
Suriname	Nieuw Nickerie	08:06:45	09:29:13	09:31:12	09:33:12	11:17:20	3:59	3:11	91.97%
Cape Verde	Praia	11:17:52	13:21:11	13:22:58	13:24:46	15:17:15	3:35	3:59	92.82%
Senegal	Dakar	12:39:43	14:42:01	14:44:09	14:46:15	16:29:33	4:14	3:50	92.63%
Senegal	Thiès	12:41:39	14:44:06	14:45:39	14:47:14	16:30:17	3:08	3:49	92.62%
Gambia	Farafenni	12:46:35	14:48:58	14:50:34	14:52:12	16:33:30	3:14	3:47	92.55%
Senegal	Tambacounda	12:54:06	14:54:04	14:56:08	14:58:12	16:36:11	4:08	3:42	92.47%
Mali	Sikasso	13:25:17	15:16:01	15:17:42	15:19:24	16:47:08	3:23	3:22	92.05%
Ghana	Tamale	13:42:56	15:26:29	15:28:09	15:29:48	16:51:58	3:19	3:09	91.76%
Togo	Atakpamé	13:50:19	15:31:20	15:32:35	15:33:51	16:54:13	2:31	3:04	91.61%
Benin	Savè	14:53:56	16:32:35	16:34:08	16:35:43	17:54:28	3:08	3:01	91.55%
Benin	Bohicon	14:53:19	16:32:46	16:34:10	16:35:35	17:54:50	2:49	3:02	91.55%
Nigeria	Abeokuta	14:56:58	16:33:56	16:35:54	16:37:53	17:55:20	3:57	2:58	91.48%
Nigeria	Lagos	14:57:27	16:35:34	16:36:22	16:37:12	17:55:44	1:38	2:58	91.47%
Nigeria	Ibadan	14:58:20	16:34:49	16:36:27	16:38:07	17:55:23	3:18	2:57	91.46%
Nigeria	Benin City	15:03:33	16:37:17	16:39:12	16:41:07	17:56:29	3:50	2:53	91.34%
Nigeria	Awka	15:07:12	16:39:46	16:40:50	16:41:55	17:56:51	2:09	2:50	91.26%
Nigeria	Owerri	15:07:34	16:39:20	16:41:15	16:43:11	17:57:15	3:51	2:50	91.25%
Nigeria	Port Harcourt	15:07:58	16:40:54	16:41:38	16:42:23	17:57:35	1:29	2:50	91.23%
Nigeria	Umuahia	15:08:38	16:39:48	16:41:41	16:43:35	17:57:19	3:47	2:49	91.22%
Nigeria	Uyo	15:09:57	16:40:31	16:42:25	16:44:19	17:57:38	3:48	2:48	91.19%
Nigeria	Calabar	15:10:56	16:40:56	16:42:51	16:44:46	17:57:43	3:50	2:47	91.17%
Cameroon	Douala	15:14:29	16:42:50	16:44:36	16:46:20	17:58:18	3:30	2:44	91.07%
Cameroon	Yaoundé	15:18:16	16:44:22	16:46:07	16:47:53	17:58:26	3:31	2:40	90.97%
Republic of the Congo	Ouésso	15:27:21	16:48:07	16:49:59	16:51:49	17:58:59	3:42	2:32	90.68%
Democratic Republic of the Congo	Mbandaka	15:31:15	16:50:02	16:51:31	16:53:00	17:48:27 (sunset)	2:58	2:17	90.54%
Burundi	Rutana	16:43:40	17:52:32	17:52:49	17:55:04	17:55:04 (sunset)	2:34	1:11	89.91%
Burundi	Gitega	16:43:33	17:53:38	17:53:51	17:54:24	17:56:07 (sunset)	0:46	1:13	89.91%
Burundi	Bujumbura	16:43:10	17:53:00	17:54:02	17:55:05	17:58:28 (sunset)	2:05	1:15	89.93%

=== Places experiencing partial eclipse ===
Solar eclipse of May 31, 2049 (local times)
Country or territory	City or place	Start of partial eclipse	Maximum eclipse	End of partial eclipse	Duration of eclipse (hr:min)	Maximum coverage
Peru	Lima	06:22:05 (sunrise)	07:04:16	08:20:51	1:59	67.82%
Ecuador	Quito	06:08:37 (sunrise)	07:07:08	08:25:17	2:17	80.05%
Venezuela	Caracas	07:09:19	08:22:54	09:52:00	2:43	64.06%
Brazil	Boa Vista	07:02:44	08:23:00	10:03:09	3:00	90.81%
Guyana	Georgetown	07:06:54	08:30:12	10:14:29	3:08	90.31%
Suriname	Paramaribo	08:07:50	09:34:13	11:23:11	3:15	91.58%
French Guiana	Cayenne	08:09:30	09:38:49	11:31:52	3:22	84.55%
Cape Verde	Santa Maria	11:21:06	13:24:45	15:17:10	3:56	90.81%
Mauritania	Nouakchott	12:46:37	14:46:22	16:28:05	3:41	81.42%
Gambia	Banjul	12:42:47	14:47:37	16:32:01	3:49	92.32%
Senegal	Touba	12:45:40	14:48:51	16:31:54	3:46	92.38%
Guinea-Bissau	Bissau	12:46:45	14:51:43	16:34:46	3:48	87.94%
Guinea	Conakry	12:55:08	14:58:56	16:38:58	3:44	81.33%
Sierra Leone	Freetown	12:57:42	15:01:00	16:40:04	3:42	78.18%
Mali	Bamako	13:16:10	15:11:33	16:43:53	3:28	91.82%
Ivory Coast	Yamoussoukro	13:29:54	15:21:54	16:50:12	3:20	81.94%
Burkina Faso	Ouagadougou	13:39:11	15:24:32	16:48:59	3:10	84.68%
Niger	Niamey	14:50:15	16:29:07	17:49:16	2:59	75.64%
Ghana	Accra	13:47:55	15:31:54	16:54:29	3:07	84.54%
Togo	Lomé	13:51:41	15:33:41	16:55:00	3:03	88.44%
Benin	Porto-Novo	14:55:24	16:35:23	17:55:27	3:00	91.16%
Nigeria	Abuja	15:06:38	16:39:16	17:54:51	2:48	82.63%
São Tomé and Príncipe	São Tomé	14:11:00	15:43:33	16:58:38	2:48	76.98%
Equatorial Guinea	Malabo	15:12:42	16:43:55	17:58:19	2:46	90.81%
Gabon	Libreville	15:16:36	16:46:05	17:59:16	2:43	81.18%
Central African Republic	Bangui	15:30:02	16:49:49	17:54:16 (sunset)	2:24	81.61%
Republic of the Congo	Impfondo	15:30:18	16:50:51	17:51:46 (sunset)	2:21	90.51%
Democratic Republic of the Congo	Kinshasa	15:29:48	16:51:19	17:53:09 (sunset)	2:23	73.90%
Burundi	Ruyigi	16:43:45	17:52:31	17:54:46 (sunset)	1:11	89.29%
Rwanda	Kigali	16:43:27	17:53:44	17:57:59 (sunset)	1:15	85.89%

== Eclipse details ==
Shown below are two tables displaying details about this particular solar eclipse. The first table outlines times at which the Moon's penumbra or umbra attains the specific parameter, and the second table describes various other parameters pertaining to this eclipse.

May 31, 2049 solar eclipse times
Event	Time (UTC)
First penumbral external contact	2049 May 31 at 10:59:01.7 UTC
First umbral external contact	2049 May 31 at 12:02:48.8 UTC
First central line	2049 May 31 at 12:04:32.9 UTC
First umbral internal contact	2049 May 31 at 12:06:17.1 UTC
First penumbral internal contact	2049 May 31 at 13:10:53.8 UTC
Equatorial conjunction	2049 May 31 at 13:59:23.1 UTC
Greatest eclipse	2049 May 31 at 13:59:58.8 UTC
Ecliptic conjunction	2049 May 31 at 14:01:22.0 UTC
Greatest duration	2049 May 31 at 14:05:27.1 UTC
Last penumbral internal contact	2049 May 31 at 14:49:03.8 UTC
Last umbral internal contact	2049 May 31 at 15:53:39.3 UTC
Last central line	2049 May 31 at 15:55:25.6 UTC
Last umbral external contact	2049 May 31 at 15:57:12.0 UTC
Last penumbral external contact	2049 May 31 at 17:01:01.0 UTC

May 31, 2049 solar eclipse parameters
Parameter	Value
Eclipse magnitude	0.96312
Eclipse obscuration	0.92760
Gamma	−0.11870
Sun right ascension	04h35m51.4s
Sun declination	+22°01'26.4"
Sun semi-diameter	15'46.5"
Sun equatorial horizontal parallax	08.7"
Moon right ascension	04h35m52.6s
Moon declination	+21°54'56.7"
Moon semi-diameter	14'57.8"
Moon equatorial horizontal parallax	0°54'55.1"
ΔT	83.7 s

== Eclipse season ==
This eclipse is part of an eclipse season, a period, roughly every six months, when eclipses occur. Only two (or occasionally three) eclipse seasons occur each year, and each season lasts about 35 days and repeats just short of six months (173 days) later; thus two full eclipse seasons always occur each year. Either two or three eclipses happen each eclipse season. In the sequence below, each eclipse is separated by a fortnight. The first and last eclipse in this sequence is separated by one synodic month.

Eclipse season of May–June 2049
May 17 Ascending node (full moon)	May 31 Descending node (new moon)	June 15 Ascending node (full moon)
Penumbral lunar eclipse Lunar Saros 112	Annular solar eclipse Solar Saros 138	Penumbral lunar eclipse Lunar Saros 150

== Related eclipses ==
=== Eclipses in 2049 ===
- A penumbral lunar eclipse on May 17
- An annular solar eclipse on May 31
- A penumbral lunar eclipse on June 15
- A penumbral lunar eclipse on November 9
- A hybrid solar eclipse on November 25

=== Metonic ===
- Preceded by: Solar eclipse of August 12, 2045
- Followed by: Solar eclipse of March 20, 2053

=== Tzolkinex ===
- Preceded by: Solar eclipse of April 20, 2042
- Followed by: Solar eclipse of July 12, 2056

=== Half-Saros ===
- Preceded by: Lunar eclipse of May 26, 2040
- Followed by: Lunar eclipse of June 6, 2058

=== Tritos ===
- Preceded by: Solar eclipse of July 2, 2038
- Followed by: Solar eclipse of April 30, 2060

=== Solar Saros 138 ===
- Preceded by: Solar eclipse of May 21, 2031
- Followed by: Solar eclipse of June 11, 2067

=== Inex ===
- Preceded by: Solar eclipse of June 21, 2020
- Followed by: Solar eclipse of May 11, 2078

=== Triad ===
- Preceded by: Solar eclipse of July 31, 1962
- Followed by: Solar eclipse of April 1, 2136

=== Solar eclipses of 2047–2050 ===
This eclipse is a member of a semester series. An eclipse in a semester series of solar eclipses repeats approximately every 177 days and 4 hours (a semester) at alternating nodes of the Moon's orbit.

The partial solar eclipses on January 26, 2047 and July 22, 2047 occur in the previous lunar year eclipse set.

Solar eclipse series sets from 2047 to 2050
Descending node			Ascending node		
Saros	Map	Gamma	Saros	Map	Gamma
118	June 23, 2047 Partial	1.3766	123	December 16, 2047 Partial	−1.0661
128	June 11, 2048 Annular	0.6468	133	December 5, 2048 Total	−0.3973
138	May 31, 2049 Annular	−0.1187	143	November 25, 2049 Hybrid	0.2943
148	May 20, 2050 Hybrid	−0.8688	153	November 14, 2050 Partial	1.0447

=== Saros 138 ===
This eclipse is a part of Saros series 138, repeating every 18 years, 11 days, and containing 70 events. The series started with a partial solar eclipse on June 6, 1472. It contains annular eclipses from August 31, 1598 through February 18, 2482; a hybrid eclipse on March 1, 2500; and total eclipses from March 12, 2518 through April 3, 2554. The series ends at member 70 as a partial eclipse on July 11, 2716. Its eclipses are tabulated in three columns; every third eclipse in the same column is one exeligmos apart, so they all cast shadows over approximately the same parts of the Earth.

The longest duration of annularity was produced by member 23 at 8 minutes, 2 seconds on February 11, 1869, and the longest duration of totality will be produced by member 61 at 56 seconds on April 3, 2554. All eclipses in this series occur at the Moon’s descending node of orbit.

Series members 20–41 occur between 1801 and 2200:
20	21	22
January 10, 1815	January 20, 1833	February 1, 1851
23	24	25
February 11, 1869	February 22, 1887	March 6, 1905
26	27	28
March 17, 1923	March 27, 1941	April 8, 1959
29	30	31
April 18, 1977	April 29, 1995	May 10, 2013
32	33	34
May 21, 2031	May 31, 2049	June 11, 2067
35	36	37
June 22, 2085	July 4, 2103	July 14, 2121
38	39	40
July 25, 2139	August 5, 2157	August 16, 2175
41
August 26, 2193

=== Metonic series ===
The metonic series repeats eclipses every 19 years (6939.69 days), lasting about 5 cycles. Eclipses occur in nearly the same calendar date. In addition, the octon subseries repeats 1/5 of that or every 3.8 years (1387.94 days). All eclipses in this table occur at the Moon's descending node.

22 eclipse events between June 1, 2011 and October 24, 2098
May 31–June 1	March 19–20	January 5–6	October 24–25	August 12–13
118	120	122	124	126
June 1, 2011	March 20, 2015	January 6, 2019	October 25, 2022	August 12, 2026
128	130	132	134	136
June 1, 2030	March 20, 2034	January 5, 2038	October 25, 2041	August 12, 2045
138	140	142	144	146
May 31, 2049	March 20, 2053	January 5, 2057	October 24, 2060	August 12, 2064
148	150	152	154	156
May 31, 2068	March 19, 2072	January 6, 2076	October 24, 2079	August 13, 2083
158	160	162	164	
June 1, 2087			October 24, 2098	

=== Tritos series ===
This eclipse is a part of a tritos cycle, repeating at alternating nodes every 135 synodic months (≈ 3986.63 days, or 11 years minus 1 month). Their appearance and longitude are irregular due to a lack of synchronization with the anomalistic month (period of perigee), but groupings of 3 tritos cycles (≈ 33 years minus 3 months) come close (≈ 434.044 anomalistic months), so eclipses are similar in these groupings.

Series members between 1801 and 2200
April 14, 1809 (Saros 116)	March 14, 1820 (Saros 117)	February 12, 1831 (Saros 118)	January 11, 1842 (Saros 119)	December 11, 1852 (Saros 120)
November 11, 1863 (Saros 121)	October 10, 1874 (Saros 122)	September 8, 1885 (Saros 123)	August 9, 1896 (Saros 124)	July 10, 1907 (Saros 125)
June 8, 1918 (Saros 126)	May 9, 1929 (Saros 127)	April 7, 1940 (Saros 128)	March 7, 1951 (Saros 129)	February 5, 1962 (Saros 130)
January 4, 1973 (Saros 131)	December 4, 1983 (Saros 132)	November 3, 1994 (Saros 133)	October 3, 2005 (Saros 134)	September 1, 2016 (Saros 135)
August 2, 2027 (Saros 136)	July 2, 2038 (Saros 137)	May 31, 2049 (Saros 138)	April 30, 2060 (Saros 139)	March 31, 2071 (Saros 140)
February 27, 2082 (Saros 141)	January 27, 2093 (Saros 142)	December 29, 2103 (Saros 143)	November 27, 2114 (Saros 144)	October 26, 2125 (Saros 145)
September 26, 2136 (Saros 146)	August 26, 2147 (Saros 147)	July 25, 2158 (Saros 148)	June 25, 2169 (Saros 149)	May 24, 2180 (Saros 150)
April 23, 2191 (Saros 151)

=== Inex series ===
This eclipse is a part of the long period inex cycle, repeating at alternating nodes, every 358 synodic months (≈ 10,571.95 days, or 29 years minus 20 days). Their appearance and longitude are irregular due to a lack of synchronization with the anomalistic month (period of perigee). However, groupings of 3 inex cycles (≈ 87 years minus 2 months) comes close (≈ 1,151.02 anomalistic months), so eclipses are similar in these groupings.

Series members between 1801 and 2200
November 9, 1817 (Saros 130)	October 20, 1846 (Saros 131)	September 29, 1875 (Saros 132)
September 9, 1904 (Saros 133)	August 21, 1933 (Saros 134)	July 31, 1962 (Saros 135)
July 11, 1991 (Saros 136)	June 21, 2020 (Saros 137)	May 31, 2049 (Saros 138)
May 11, 2078 (Saros 139)	April 23, 2107 (Saros 140)	April 1, 2136 (Saros 141)
March 12, 2165 (Saros 142)	February 21, 2194 (Saros 143)	
