= Solar eclipse of May 21, 2031 =

Future annular solar eclipse

- Annular eclipse
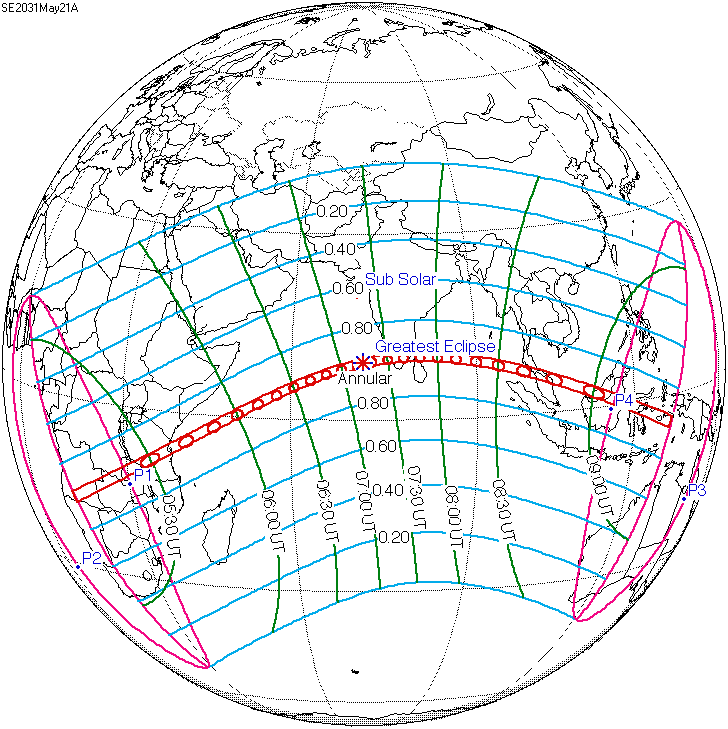
- Map
- Gamma: −0.197
- Magnitude: 0.9589

Maximum eclipse
- Duration: 326 s (5 min 26 s)
- Coordinates: 8.9°N 71.7°E
- Max. width of band: 152 km (94 mi)

Times (UTC)
- Greatest eclipse: 7:16:04

References
- Saros: 138 (32 of 70)
- Catalog # (SE5000): 9577

An annular solar eclipse will occur at the Moon's descending node of orbit on Wednesday, May 21, 2031, with a magnitude of 0.9589. A solar eclipse occurs when the Moon passes between Earth and the Sun, thereby totally or partly obscuring the image of the Sun for a viewer on Earth. An annular solar eclipse occurs when the Moon's apparent diameter is smaller than the Sun's, blocking most of the Sun's light and causing the Sun to look like an annulus (ring). An annular eclipse appears as a partial eclipse over a region of the Earth thousands of kilometres wide. Occurring about 3.8 days before apogee (on May 25, 2031, at 3:10 UTC), the Moon's apparent diameter will be smaller.

Annularity will be visible from parts of Angola, Zambia, the southern Democratic Republic of the Congo, northern Malawi, Tanzania, southern India, northern Sri Lanka, the Andaman and Nicobar Islands, southern Thailand, Malaysia, and much of Indonesia. A partial eclipse will be visible for much of Africa, the Middle East, South Asia, Southeast Asia, and Australia.

== Images ==
Animated path

== Eclipse timing ==
=== Places experiencing annular eclipse ===
Solar Eclipse of May 21, 2031 (Local Times)
Country or territory	City or place	Start of partial eclipse	Start of annular eclipse	Maximum eclipse	End of annular eclipse	End of partial eclipse	Duration of annularity (min:s)	Duration of eclipse (hr:min)	Maximum coverage
Democratic Republic of the Congo	Lubumbashi	06:20:25 (sunrise)	07:21:59	07:23:56	07:25:53	08:46:19	3:54	2:26	90.03%
Zambia	Kasama	06:14:31	07:24:26	07:26:27	07:28:29	08:52:48	4:03	2:38	90.24%
Tanzania	Mbeya	07:14:56	08:26:35	08:28:36	08:30:36	09:57:40	4:01	2:43	90.39%
Tanzania	Dar es Salaam	07:16:42	08:33:46	08:35:13	08:36:40	10:11:54	2:54	2:55	90.73%
Tanzania	Zanzibar City	07:16:57	08:33:23	08:35:30	08:37:37	10:12:15	4:14	2:55	90.74%
India	Kochi	10:57:36	13:01:00	13:03:23	13:05:46	15:02:30	4:46	4:05	92.05%
India	Alappuzha	10:57:19	13:00:50	13:03:28	13:06:05	15:02:46	5:15	4:05	92.05%
India	Chalakudy	10:58:16	13:03:02	13:03:53	13:04:45	15:02:38	1:43	4:04	92.05%
India	Kottayam	10:58:02	13:01:34	13:04:14	13:06:55	15:03:14	5:21	4:05	92.04%
India	Thiruvalla	10:57:59	13:01:54	13:04:20	13:06:48	15:03:24	4:54	4:05	92.04%
India	Pathanamthitta	10:58:32	13:02:59	13:05:06	13:07:15	15:03:57	4:16	4:05	92.03%
India	Painavu	10:59:40	13:03:21	13:05:58	13:08:36	15:04:15	5:15	4:05	92.04%
India	Gudalur	11:00:29	13:04:24	13:07:05	13:09:46	15:05:03	5:22	4:05	92.03%
India	Theni	11:01:36	13:05:39	13:08:08	13:10:36	15:05:33	4:57	4:04	92.02%
India	Madurai	11:03:37	13:07:53	13:10:30	13:13:07	15:07:06	5:14	4:03	92.01%
India	Ilaiyangudi	11:05:03	13:09:45	13:12:21	13:14:56	15:08:22	5:11	4:03	91.99%
India	Karaikudi	11:06:00	13:10:34	13:13:02	13:15:31	15:08:37	4:57	4:03	91.99%
India	Vedaranyam	11:10:02	13:15:28	13:17:07	13:18:48	15:10:56	3:20	4:01	91.96%
Sri Lanka	Jaffna	11:09:55	13:14:58	13:17:33	13:20:08	15:11:30	5:10	4:02	91.95%
Malaysia	Kangar	14:56:18	16:42:13	16:44:23	16:46:35	18:09:56	4:22	3:14	90.95%
Malaysia	Alor Setar	14:56:54	16:42:31	16:44:49	16:47:06	18:10:09	4:35	3:13	90.94%
Malaysia	George Town	14:56:54	16:44:03	16:44:59	16:45:57	18:10:22	1:54	3:13	90.93%
Malaysia	Kota Bharu	15:03:09	16:46:23	16:47:59	16:49:37	18:11:15	3:14	3:08	90.83%
Malaysia	Kuala Terengganu	15:06:04	16:47:25	16:49:39	16:51:53	18:11:59	4:28	3:06	90.77%
Malaysia	Sarikei	15:29:12	16:58:41	17:00:46	17:02:50	18:15:15	4:09	2:46	90.25%
Malaysia	Sibu	15:29:51	16:58:54	17:00:59	17:03:06	18:15:14	4:12	2:45	90.24%
Indonesia	Samarinda	15:40:44	17:04:08	17:05:25	17:06:44	18:10:50 (sunset)	2:36	2:30	89.90%
Indonesia	Palu	15:45:07	17:04:52	17:06:53	17:08:53	17:59:21 (sunset)	4:01	2:14	89.75%
Indonesia	Ambon	16:55:01	18:07:17	18:09:11	18:11:04	18:21:58 (sunset)	3:47	1:27	89.29%

=== Places experiencing partial eclipse ===
Solar Eclipse of May 21, 2031 (Local Times)
Country or territory	City or place	Start of partial eclipse	Maximum eclipse	End of partial eclipse	Duration of eclipse (hr:min)	Maximum coverage
Angola	Menongue	06:04:10 (sunrise)	06:20:46	07:34:37	1:30	89.03%
Angola	Huambo	06:09:07 (sunrise)	06:20:46	07:32:57	1:24	80.87%
Angola	Luena	05:50:52 (sunrise)	06:21:25	07:36:53	1:46	83.07%
Angola	Luanda	06:13:10 (sunrise)	06:21:28	07:30.16	1:17	64.42%
Namibia	Windhoek	07:19:30 (sunrise)	07:21:58	08:33:16	1:14	72.46%
Zambia	Lusaka	06:23:01 (sunrise)	07:23:45	08:45:44	2:23	81.36%
Zimbabwe	Harare	06:15:45 (sunrise)	07:25:11	08:47:54	2:32	69.41%
Malawi	Lilongwe	06:14:35	07:27:20	08:54:43	2:40	77.91%
Burundi	Gitega	06:18:24	07:28:51	08:53:10	2:35	70.40%
Rwanda	Kigali	06:19:45	07:29:54	08:53:47	2:34	65.82%
Tanzania	Dodoma	07:16:16	08:31:55	10:04:09	2:48	88.51%
Kenya	Nairobi	07:19:59	08:36:19	10:09:38	2:50	74.72%
Comoros	Moroni	07:18:00	08:37:46	10:16:03	2:58	70.16%
Somalia	Mogadishu	07:25:47	08:50:58	10:37:14	3:11	78.87%
Seychelles	Victoria	08:30:16	10:05:18	12:04:20	3:34	72.04%
Maldives	Malé	10:13:55	12:18:22	14:23:15	4:09	77.42%
India	Mumbai	11:03:33	12:55:57	14:47:03	3:44	60.09%
India	Bengaluru	11:05:36	13:09:31	15:04:31	3:59	83.75%
Sri Lanka	Sri Jayawardenepura Kotte	11:07:26	13:16:25	15:11:30	4:04	84.78%
Myanmar	Yangon	13:16:00	15:01:23	16:27:47	3:12	61.64%
Thailand	Bangkok	13:58:37	15:41:17	17:04:24	3:06	68.19%
Malaysia	Kuala Lumpur	15:02:07	16:48:00	18:11:41	3:10	85.80%
Cambodia	Phnom Penh	14:11:43	15:49:19	17:08:25	2:57	70.76%
Singapore	Singapore	15:09:36	16:51:48	18:12:57	3:03	81.80%
Vietnam	Ho Chi Minh City	14:16:39	15:52:05	17:09:37	2:53	71.40%
Australia	Darwin	17:27:24	18:25:55	18:28:13 (sunset)	1:01	61.23%
Indonesia	Jakarta	14:22:29	15:56:07	17:11:40	2:49	60.10%
Indonesia	Pontianak	14:24:52	15:59:00	17:15:01	2:50	83.76%
Brunei	Bandar Seri Begawan	15:36:05	17:02:43	18:14:15	2:38	81.23%
Timor-Leste	Dili	16:53:05	18:08:20	18:25:10 (sunset)	1:32	75.03%

== Eclipse details ==
Shown below are two tables displaying details about this particular solar eclipse. The first table outlines times at which the Moon's penumbra or umbra attains the specific parameter, and the second table describes various other parameters pertaining to this eclipse.

May 21, 2031 Solar Eclipse Times
Event	Time (UTC)
First Penumbral External Contact	2031 May 21 at 04:15:23.0 UTC
First Umbral External Contact	2031 May 21 at 05:19:52.6 UTC
First Central Line	2031 May 21 at 05:21:47.0 UTC
First Umbral Internal Contact	2031 May 21 at 05:23:41.5 UTC
First Penumbral Internal Contact	2031 May 21 at 06:30:37.3 UTC
Equatorial Conjunction	2031 May 21 at 07:13:28.3 UTC
Greatest Eclipse	2031 May 21 at 07:16:04.3 UTC
Ecliptic Conjunction	2031 May 21 at 07:18:22.9 UTC
Greatest Duration	2031 May 21 at 07:24:28.7 UTC
Last Penumbral Internal Contact	2031 May 21 at 08:01:34.7 UTC
Last Umbral Internal Contact	2031 May 21 at 09:08:27.6 UTC
Last Central Line	2031 May 21 at 09:10:24.0 UTC
Last Umbral External Contact	2031 May 21 at 09:12:20.5 UTC
Last Penumbral External Contact	2031 May 21 at 10:16:51.4 UTC

May 21, 2031 Solar Eclipse Parameters
Parameter	Value
Eclipse Magnitude	0.95892
Eclipse Obscuration	0.91954
Gamma	−0.19699
Sun Right Ascension	03h51m34.6s
Sun Declination	+20°09'39.2"
Sun Semi-Diameter	15'48.2"
Sun Equatorial Horizontal Parallax	08.7"
Moon Right Ascension	03h51m39.8s
Moon Declination	+19°58'57.5"
Moon Semi-Diameter	14'55.8"
Moon Equatorial Horizontal Parallax	0°54'47.5"
ΔT	74.4 s

== Stars and Planets during the Eclipse ==
Even those stars and planets bright enough to be visible during a total solar eclipse are in most cases not visible during an annular eclipse. The best candidate for naked-eye sighting is Venus, although it will be many degrees east of the Sun and therefore below the eastern horizon for morning observers in Africa. In southern India it will be well up in the east but at a lower altitude than the Sun. Venus will be best seen in those areas such as Malaysia and Indonesia where the eclipse peaks near sunset; it will be high in the west.

If any star is spotted during the eclipse it will be Sirius, which will be high in the east-southeast for observers in India and high in the west-southwest for observers in the East Indies.

== Eclipse season ==
This eclipse is part of an eclipse season, a period, roughly every six months, when eclipses occur. Only two (or occasionally three) eclipse seasons occur each year, and each season lasts about 35 days and repeats just short of six months (173 days) later; thus two full eclipse seasons always occur each year. Either two or three eclipses happen each eclipse season. In the sequence below, each eclipse is separated by a fortnight. The first and last eclipse in this sequence is separated by one synodic month.

Eclipse season of May–June 2031
May 7 Ascending node (full moon)	May 21 Descending node (new moon)	June 5 Ascending node (full moon)
Penumbral lunar eclipse Lunar Saros 112	Annular solar eclipse Solar Saros 138	Penumbral lunar eclipse Lunar Saros 150

== Related eclipses ==
=== Eclipses in 2031 ===
- A penumbral lunar eclipse on May 7.
- An annular solar eclipse on May 21.
- A penumbral lunar eclipse on June 5.
- A penumbral lunar eclipse on October 30.
- A hybrid solar eclipse on November 14.

=== Metonic ===
- Preceded by: Solar eclipse of August 2, 2027
- Followed by: Solar eclipse of March 9, 2035

=== Tzolkinex ===
- Preceded by: Solar eclipse of April 8, 2024
- Followed by: Solar eclipse of July 2, 2038

=== Half-Saros ===
- Preceded by: Lunar eclipse of May 16, 2022
- Followed by: Lunar eclipse of May 26, 2040

=== Tritos ===
- Preceded by: Solar eclipse of June 21, 2020
- Followed by: Solar eclipse of April 20, 2042

=== Solar Saros 138 ===
- Preceded by: Solar eclipse of May 10, 2013
- Followed by: Solar eclipse of May 31, 2049

=== Inex ===
- Preceded by: Solar eclipse of June 10, 2002
- Followed by: Solar eclipse of April 30, 2060

=== Triad ===
- Preceded by: Solar eclipse of July 20, 1944
- Followed by: Solar eclipse of March 22, 2118

=== Solar eclipses of 2029–2032 ===
This eclipse is a member of a semester series. An eclipse in a semester series of solar eclipses repeats approximately every 177 days and 4 hours (a semester) at alternating nodes of the Moon's orbit.

The partial solar eclipses on January 14, 2029 and July 11, 2029 occur in the previous lunar year eclipse set.

Solar eclipse series sets from 2029 to 2032
Descending node			Ascending node		
Saros	Map	Gamma	Saros	Map	Gamma
118	June 12, 2029 Partial	1.29431	123	December 5, 2029 Partial	−1.06090
128	June 1, 2030 Annular	0.56265	133	November 25, 2030 Total	−0.38669
138	May 21, 2031 Annular	−0.19699	143	November 14, 2031 Hybrid	0.30776
148	May 9, 2032 Annular	−0.93748	153	November 3, 2032 Partial	1.06431

=== Saros 138 ===
This eclipse is a part of Saros series 138, repeating every 18 years, 11 days, and containing 70 events. The series started with a partial solar eclipse on June 6, 1472. It contains annular eclipses from August 31, 1598 through February 18, 2482; a hybrid eclipse on March 1, 2500; and total eclipses from March 12, 2518 through April 3, 2554. The series ends at member 70 as a partial eclipse on July 11, 2716. Its eclipses are tabulated in three columns; every third eclipse in the same column is one exeligmos apart, so they all cast shadows over approximately the same parts of the Earth.

The longest duration of annularity was produced by member 23 at 8 minutes, 2 seconds on February 11, 1869, and the longest duration of totality will be produced by member 61 at 56 seconds on April 3, 2554. All eclipses in this series occur at the Moon’s descending node of orbit.

Series members 20–41 occur between 1801 and 2200:
20	21	22
January 10, 1815	January 20, 1833	February 1, 1851
23	24	25
February 11, 1869	February 22, 1887	March 6, 1905
26	27	28
March 17, 1923	March 27, 1941	April 8, 1959
29	30	31
April 18, 1977	April 29, 1995	May 10, 2013
32	33	34
May 21, 2031	May 31, 2049	June 11, 2067
35	36	37
June 22, 2085	July 4, 2103	July 14, 2121
38	39	40
July 25, 2139	August 5, 2157	August 16, 2175
41
August 26, 2193

=== Metonic series ===
The metonic series repeats eclipses every 19 years (6939.69 days), lasting about 5 cycles. Eclipses occur in nearly the same calendar date. In addition, the octon subseries repeats 1/5 of that or every 3.8 years (1387.94 days). All eclipses in this table occur at the Moon's descending node.

21 eclipse events between May 21, 1993 and May 20, 2069
May 20–21	March 9	December 25–26	October 13–14	August 1–2
118	120	122	124	126
May 21, 1993	March 9, 1997	December 25, 2000	October 14, 2004	August 1, 2008
128	130	132	134	136
May 20, 2012	March 9, 2016	December 26, 2019	October 14, 2023	August 2, 2027
138	140	142	144	146
May 21, 2031	March 9, 2035	December 26, 2038	October 14, 2042	August 2, 2046
148	150	152	154	156
May 20, 2050	March 9, 2054	December 26, 2057	October 13, 2061	August 2, 2065
158
May 20, 2069

=== Tritos series ===
This eclipse is a part of a tritos cycle, repeating at alternating nodes every 135 synodic months (≈ 3986.63 days, or 11 years minus 1 month). Their appearance and longitude are irregular due to a lack of synchronization with the anomalistic month (period of perigee), but groupings of 3 tritos cycles (≈ 33 years minus 3 months) come close (≈ 434.044 anomalistic months), so eclipses are similar in these groupings.

Series members between 1801 and 2200
March 4, 1802 (Saros 117)	February 1, 1813 (Saros 118)	January 1, 1824 (Saros 119)	November 30, 1834 (Saros 120)	October 30, 1845 (Saros 121)
September 29, 1856 (Saros 122)	August 29, 1867 (Saros 123)	July 29, 1878 (Saros 124)	June 28, 1889 (Saros 125)	May 28, 1900 (Saros 126)
April 28, 1911 (Saros 127)	March 28, 1922 (Saros 128)	February 24, 1933 (Saros 129)	January 25, 1944 (Saros 130)	December 25, 1954 (Saros 131)
November 23, 1965 (Saros 132)	October 23, 1976 (Saros 133)	September 23, 1987 (Saros 134)	August 22, 1998 (Saros 135)	July 22, 2009 (Saros 136)
June 21, 2020 (Saros 137)	May 21, 2031 (Saros 138)	April 20, 2042 (Saros 139)	March 20, 2053 (Saros 140)	February 17, 2064 (Saros 141)
January 16, 2075 (Saros 142)	December 16, 2085 (Saros 143)	November 15, 2096 (Saros 144)	October 16, 2107 (Saros 145)	September 15, 2118 (Saros 146)
August 15, 2129 (Saros 147)	July 14, 2140 (Saros 148)	June 14, 2151 (Saros 149)	May 14, 2162 (Saros 150)	April 12, 2173 (Saros 151)
March 12, 2184 (Saros 152)	February 10, 2195 (Saros 153)			

=== Inex series ===
This eclipse is a part of the long period inex cycle, repeating at alternating nodes, every 358 synodic months (≈ 10,571.95 days, or 29 years minus 20 days). Their appearance and longitude are irregular due to a lack of synchronization with the anomalistic month (period of perigee). However, groupings of 3 inex cycles (≈ 87 years minus 2 months) comes close (≈ 1,151.02 anomalistic months), so eclipses are similar in these groupings.

Series members between 1801 and 2200
October 9, 1828 (Saros 131)	September 18, 1857 (Saros 132)	August 29, 1886 (Saros 133)
August 10, 1915 (Saros 134)	July 20, 1944 (Saros 135)	June 30, 1973 (Saros 136)
June 10, 2002 (Saros 137)	May 21, 2031 (Saros 138)	April 30, 2060 (Saros 139)
April 10, 2089 (Saros 140)	March 22, 2118 (Saros 141)	March 2, 2147 (Saros 142)
February 10, 2176 (Saros 143)		
