= June 2031 lunar eclipse =

Lunar Eclipse

- Penumbral eclipse
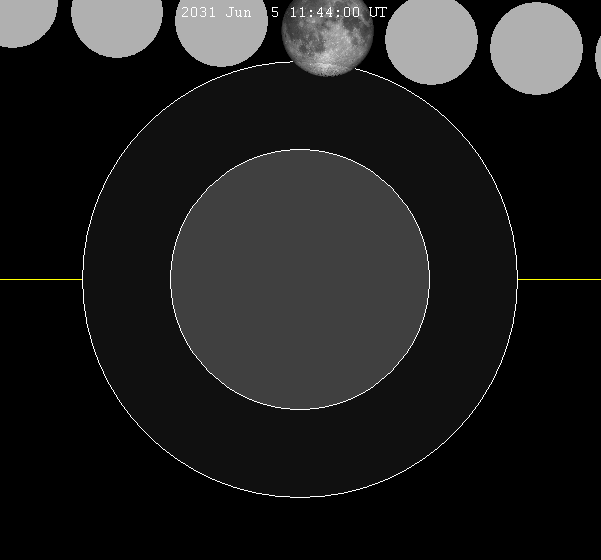
- The Moon's hourly motion shown right to left
- Date: June 5, 2031
- Gamma: 1.4732
- Magnitude: −0.8185
- Saros cycle: 150 (2 of 71)
- Penumbral: 95 minutes, 33 seconds
Contacts (UTC)
- P1: 10:56:16
- Greatest: 11:45:17
- P4: 12:31:49

A penumbral lunar eclipse will occur at the Moon’s ascending node of orbit on Thursday, June 5, 2031, with an umbral magnitude of −0.8185. A lunar eclipse occurs when the Moon moves into the Earth's shadow, causing the Moon to be darkened. A penumbral lunar eclipse occurs when part or all of the Moon's near side passes into the Earth's penumbra. Unlike a solar eclipse, which can only be viewed from a relatively small area of the world, a lunar eclipse may be viewed from anywhere on the night side of Earth. Occurring only about 20.5 hours before perigee (on June 6, 2031, at 8:10 UTC), the Moon's apparent diameter will be larger.

== Visibility ==
The eclipse will be completely visible over the Pacific Ocean, Australia, and Antarctica, seen rising over east Asia and setting over western North and South America.

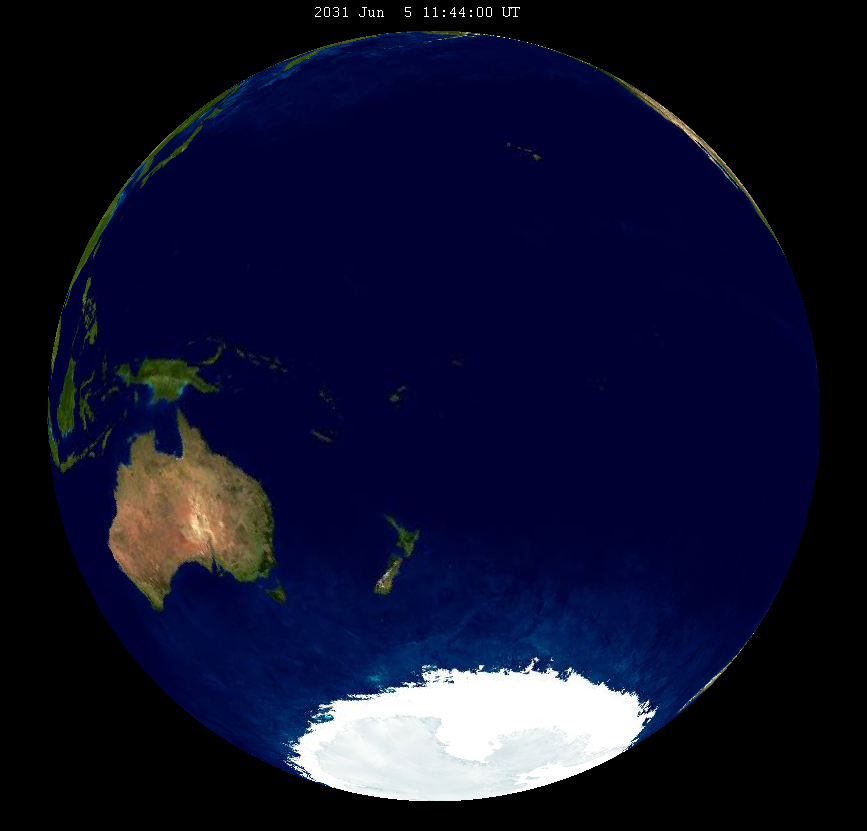
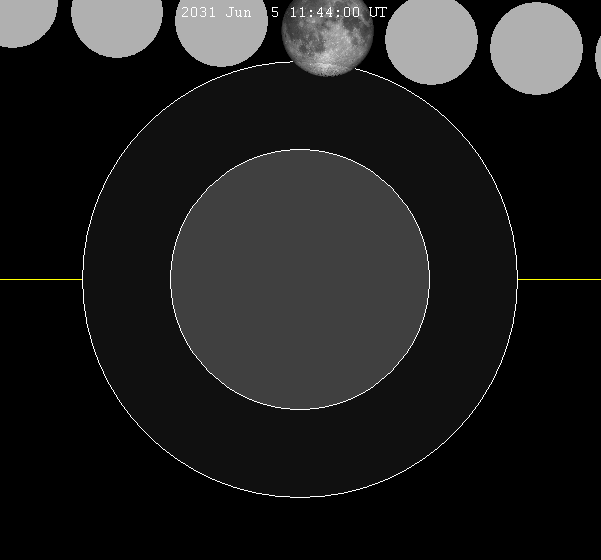

== Eclipse details ==
Shown below is a table displaying details about this particular solar eclipse. It describes various parameters pertaining to this eclipse.

June 5, 2031 Lunar Eclipse Parameters
Parameter	Value
Penumbral Magnitude	0.13062
Umbral Magnitude	−0.81845
Gamma	1.47322
Sun Right Ascension	04h53m21.6s
Sun Declination	+22°33'01.5"
Sun Semi-Diameter	15'45.9"
Sun Equatorial Horizontal Parallax	08.7"
Moon Right Ascension	16h53m29.4s
Moon Declination	-21°03'14.0"
Moon Semi-Diameter	16'36.6"
Moon Equatorial Horizontal Parallax	1°00'57.7"
ΔT	74.6 s

== Eclipse season ==
This eclipse is part of an eclipse season, a period, roughly every six months, when eclipses occur. Only two (or occasionally three) eclipse seasons occur each year, and each season lasts about 35 days and repeats just short of six months (173 days) later; thus two full eclipse seasons always occur each year. Either two or three eclipses happen each eclipse season. In the sequence below, each eclipse is separated by a fortnight. The first and last eclipse in this sequence is separated by one synodic month.

Eclipse season of May–June 2031
May 7 Ascending node (full moon)	May 21 Descending node (new moon)	June 5 Ascending node (full moon)
Penumbral lunar eclipse Lunar Saros 112	Annular solar eclipse Solar Saros 138	Penumbral lunar eclipse Lunar Saros 150

== Related eclipses ==
=== Eclipses in 2031 ===
- A penumbral lunar eclipse on May 7.
- An annular solar eclipse on May 21.
- A penumbral lunar eclipse on June 5.
- A penumbral lunar eclipse on October 30.
- A hybrid solar eclipse on November 14.

=== Metonic ===
- Preceded by: Lunar eclipse of August 17, 2027

=== Tzolkinex ===
- Followed by: Lunar eclipse of July 16, 2038

=== Tritos ===
- Preceded by: Lunar eclipse of July 5, 2020

=== Lunar Saros 150 ===
- Preceded by: Lunar eclipse of May 25, 2013
- Followed by: Lunar eclipse of June 15, 2049

=== Inex ===
- Preceded by: Lunar eclipse of June 24, 2002

=== Triad ===
- Preceded by: Lunar eclipse of August 4, 1944

=== Lunar eclipses of 2027–2031 ===
This eclipse is a member of a semester series. An eclipse in a semester series of lunar eclipses repeats approximately every 177 days and 4 hours (a semester) at alternating nodes of the Moon's orbit.

The penumbral lunar eclipses on February 20, 2027 and August 17, 2027 occur in the previous lunar year eclipse set, and the penumbral lunar eclipses on May 7, 2031 and October 30, 2031 occur in the next lunar year eclipse set.

Lunar eclipse series sets from 2027 to 2031
Ascending node				Descending node			
Saros	Date Viewing	Type Chart	Gamma	Saros	Date Viewing	Type Chart	Gamma
110	2027 Jul 18	Penumbral	−1.5759	115	2028 Jan 12	Partial	0.9818
120	2028 Jul 06	Partial	−0.7904	125	2028 Dec 31	Total	0.3258
130	2029 Jun 26	Total	0.0124	135	2029 Dec 20	Total	−0.3811
140	2030 Jun 15	Partial	0.7535	145	2030 Dec 09	Penumbral	−1.0732
150	2031 Jun 05	Penumbral	1.4732				

=== Saros 150 ===
This eclipse is a part of Saros series 150, repeating every 18 years, 11 days, and containing 71 events. The series started with a penumbral lunar eclipse on May 25, 2013. It contains partial eclipses from August 20, 2157 through April 19, 2554; total eclipses from April 29, 2572 through August 28, 2770; and a second set of partial eclipses from September 7, 2788 through February 8, 3041. The series ends at member 71 as a penumbral eclipse on June 30, 3275.

The longest duration of totality will be produced by member 36 at 105 minutes, 16 seconds on July 4, 2680. All eclipses in this series occur at the Moon’s ascending node of orbit.

Greatest	First			
The greatest eclipse of the series will occur on 2680 Jul 04, lasting 105 minutes, 16 seconds.	Penumbral	Partial	Total	Central
The greatest eclipse of the series will occur on 2680 Jul 04, lasting 105 minutes, 16 seconds.	2013 May 25	2157 Aug 20	2572 Apr 29	2626 Jun 02
The greatest eclipse of the series will occur on 2680 Jul 04, lasting 105 minutes, 16 seconds.	Last			
The greatest eclipse of the series will occur on 2680 Jul 04, lasting 105 minutes, 16 seconds.	Central	Total	Partial	Penumbral
The greatest eclipse of the series will occur on 2680 Jul 04, lasting 105 minutes, 16 seconds.	2734 Aug 07	2770 Aug 28	3041 Feb 08	3275 Jun 30

Eclipses are tabulated in three columns; every third eclipse in the same column is one exeligmos apart, so they all cast shadows over approximately the same parts of the Earth.

Series members 1–11 occur between 2013 and 2200:
1	2	3
2013 May 25	2031 Jun 05	2049 Jun 15
4	5	6
2067 Jun 27	2085 Jul 07	2103 Jul 19
7	8	9
2121 Jul 30	2139 Aug 10	2157 Aug 20
10	11	
2175 Aug 31	2193 Sep 11	

=== Tritos series ===
This eclipse is a part of a tritos cycle, repeating at alternating nodes every 135 synodic months (≈ 3986.63 days, or 11 years minus 1 month). Their appearance and longitude are irregular due to a lack of synchronization with the anomalistic month (period of perigee), but groupings of 3 tritos cycles (≈ 33 years minus 3 months) come close (≈ 434.044 anomalistic months), so eclipses are similar in these groupings.

Series members between 1801 and 2096
1802 Mar 19 (Saros 129)	1813 Feb 15 (Saros 130)	1824 Jan 16 (Saros 131)	1834 Dec 16 (Saros 132)	1845 Nov 14 (Saros 133)
1856 Oct 13 (Saros 134)	1867 Sep 14 (Saros 135)	1878 Aug 13 (Saros 136)	1889 Jul 12 (Saros 137)	1900 Jun 13 (Saros 138)
1911 May 13 (Saros 139)	1922 Apr 11 (Saros 140)	1933 Mar 12 (Saros 141)	1944 Feb 09 (Saros 142)	1955 Jan 08 (Saros 143)
1965 Dec 08 (Saros 144)	1976 Nov 06 (Saros 145)	1987 Oct 07 (Saros 146)	1998 Sep 06 (Saros 147)	2009 Aug 06 (Saros 148)
2020 Jul 05 (Saros 149)	2031 Jun 05 (Saros 150)			
		2096 Nov 29 (Saros 156)		

=== Inex series ===
This eclipse is a part of the long period inex cycle, repeating at alternating nodes, every 358 synodic months (≈ 10,571.95 days, or 29 years minus 20 days). Their appearance and longitude are irregular due to a lack of synchronization with the anomalistic month (period of perigee). However, groupings of 3 inex cycles (≈ 87 years minus 2 months) comes close (≈ 1,151.02 anomalistic months), so eclipses are similar in these groupings.

Series members between 1801 and 2031
1828 Oct 23 (Saros 143)	1857 Oct 03 (Saros 144)	1886 Sep 13 (Saros 145)
1915 Aug 24 (Saros 146)	1944 Aug 04 (Saros 147)	1973 Jul 15 (Saros 148)
2002 Jun 24 (Saros 149)	2031 Jun 05 (Saros 150)	

== See also ==
- List of lunar eclipses and List of 21st-century lunar eclipses
