= Solar eclipse of May 10, 2013 =

21st-century annular solar eclipse

- Annular eclipse
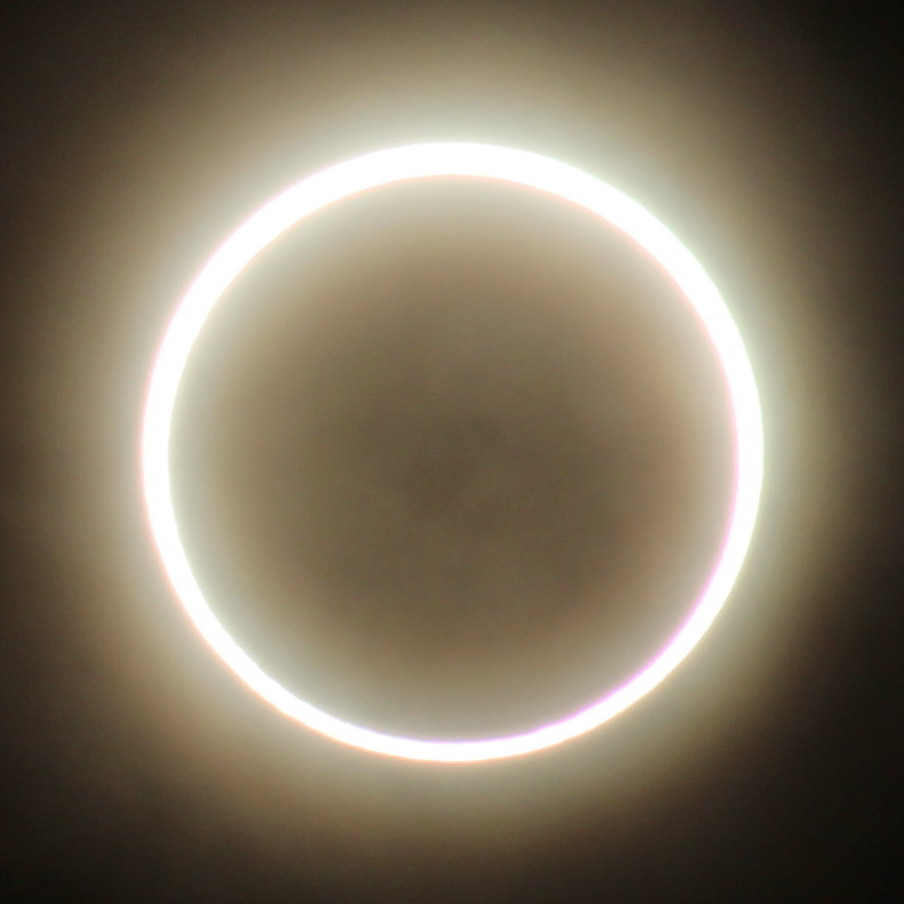
- Annularity viewed from Churchills Head, Australia.

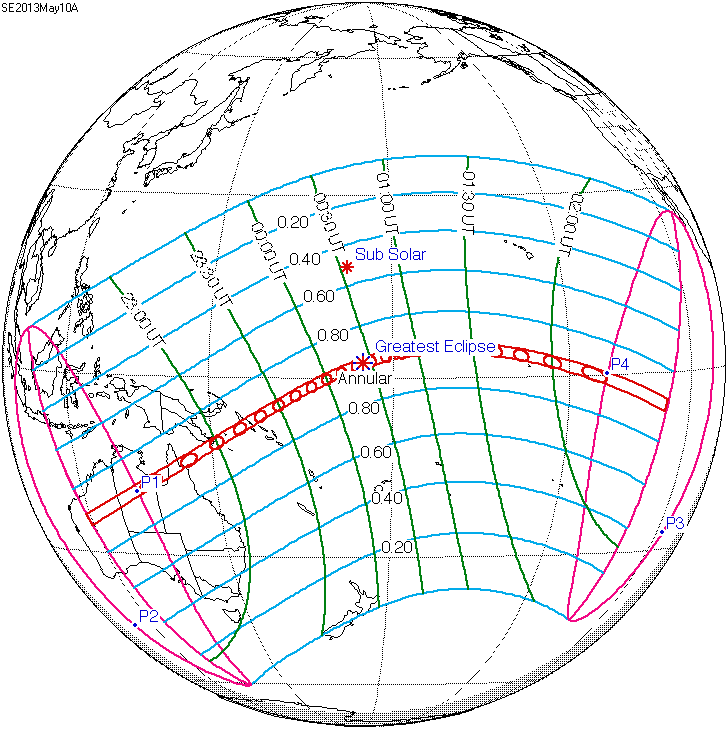
- Map
- Gamma: −0.2694
- Magnitude: 0.9544

Maximum eclipse
- Duration: 363 s (6 min 3 s)
- Coordinates: 2.2°N 175.5°E
- Max. width of band: 173 km (107 mi)

Times (UTC)
- (P1) Partial begin: 21:25:10
- (U1) Total begin: 22:30:34
- Greatest eclipse: 0:26:20
- (U4) Total end: 2:19:58
- (P4) Partial end: 3:25:23

References
- Saros: 138 (31 of 70)
- Catalog # (SE5000): 9537

An annular solar eclipse occurred at the Moon's descending node of orbit between Thursday, May 9 and Friday, May 10, 2013, with a magnitude of 0.9544. A solar eclipse occurs when the Moon passes between Earth and the Sun, thereby totally or partly obscuring the image of the Sun for a viewer on Earth. An annular solar eclipse occurs when the Moon's apparent diameter is smaller than the Sun's, blocking most of the Sun's light and causing the Sun to look like an annulus (ring). An annular eclipse appears as a partial eclipse over a region of the Earth thousands of kilometres wide. Occurring about 3.6 days before apogee (on May 13, 2013, at 14:30 UTC), the Moon's apparent diameter was smaller.

Annularity was visible from parts of Western Australia, Northern Territory and Queensland, Australia, the Louisiade Archipelago (belonging to Papua New Guinea), the Solomon Islands, and Kiribati. All land within the path of annularity was west of the 180th meridian, except Tabuaeran in Kiribati. However, time zone of the Line Islands including Tabuaeran was changed from UTC−10 to UTC+14 in 1995, so annular eclipse visible from land was completely on May 10.

A partial eclipse was visible for parts of Indonesia, Australia, New Zealand, Oceania, and Hawaii. Part of these areas are west of the 180th meridian, seeing the eclipse on May 10, and the rest east of the 180th meridian, seeing the eclipse on May 9.

== Visibility ==
Animation of eclipse path.

Annularity was visible from a 171 to 225 kilometre-wide track that traversed Australia, eastern Papua New Guinea, the Solomon Islands, and the Gilbert Islands, with the maximum of 6 minutes 3 seconds visible from the Pacific Ocean east of French Polynesia.

== Eclipse timing ==
=== Places experiencing annular eclipse ===
Solar Eclipse of May 10, 2013 (Local Times)
Country or territory	City or place	Start of partial eclipse	Start of annular eclipse	Maximum eclipse	End of annular eclipse	End of partial eclipse	Duration of annularity (min:s)	Duration of eclipse (hr:min)	Maximum coverage
Australia	Newman	06:25:06 (sunrise)	06:31:34	06:32:28	06:33:22	07:45:55	1:48	1:21	88.61%
Australia	Tennant Creek	06:55:11	08:05:47	08:07:19	08:08:50	09:32:45	3:03	2:41	89.33%
Solomon Islands	Gizo	08:39:05	10:12:11	10:13:36	10:15:01	12:10:37	2:50	3:32	90.65%
Kiribati	Tarawa	10:15:32	12:11:51	12:14:47	12:17:44	14:22:10	5:53	4:07	91.24%

=== Places experiencing partial eclipse ===
Solar Eclipse of May 10, 2013 (Local Times)
Country or territory	City or place	Start of partial eclipse	Maximum eclipse	End of partial eclipse	Duration of eclipse (hr:min)	Maximum coverage
Indonesia	Denpasar	06:23:03 (sunrise)	06:33:29	07:35:06	1:12	37.04%
Timor-Leste	Dili	06:41:29 (sunrise)	07:35:46	08:48:32	2:07	48.32%
Australia	Darwin	06:57:43	08:06:46	09:28:16	2:33	67.92%
Australia	Cairns	07:27:58	08:48:44	10:27:02	2:59	83.11%
Indonesia	Jayapura	06:37:26	07:51:46	09:21:28	2:44	51.19%
Australia	Melbourne	07:50:09	08:52:16	10:02:08	2:12	24.80%
Papua New Guinea	Port Moresby	07:31:09	08:54:41	10:37:38	3:06	83.94%
Indonesia	Jakarta	05:53:27 (sunrise)	05:56:21	06:25:21	0:32	15.56%
Australia	Perth	06:54:25 (sunrise)	06:57:05	07:45:03	0:51	51.01%
Australia	Sydney	07:49:34	08:57:08	10:14:22	2:25	26.98%
Australia	Brisbane	07:41:17	08:57:50	10:27:59	2:47	40.49%
Solomon Islands	Honiara	08:42:02	10:19:36	12:19:27	3:37	82.45%
New Caledonia	Nouméa	08:58:50	10:27:22	12:10:22	3:12	35.03%
Vanuatu	Port Vila	08:58:46	10:35:43	12:28:33	3:30	44.03%
Federated States of Micronesia	Palikir	09:02:15	10:36:25	12:28:31	3:26	52.52%
Nauru	Yaren	10:00:22	11:50:41	13:58:39	3:58	90.88%
Fiji	Suva	10:30:41	12:12:51	13:58:32	3:28	30.89%
Marshall Islands	Majuro	10:21:27	12:16:42	14:19:44	3:58	73.44%
United States Minor Outlying Islands	Wake Island	10:47:56	12:18:02	13:53:45	3:06	28.65%
Tuvalu	Funafuti	10:27:10	12:27:02	14:26:36	3:59	56.26%
Wallis and Futuna	Mata Utu	10:47:14	12:41:39	14:28:27	3:41	39.10%
United States Minor Outlying Islands	Baker Island (Note: The times listed for this location occur on May 9, 2013, local time.)	10:45:57	12:54:39	14:50:46	4:05	81.21%
Samoa	Apia	12:06:56	13:59:39	15:38:16	3:31	36.01%
Tokelau	Fakaofo	12:05:55	14:06:31	15:49:30	3:44	48.50%
United States Minor Outlying Islands	Palmyra Atoll	13:46:32	15:42:57	17:15:45	3:29	87.42%
United States	Honolulu	14:22:30	15:47:47	17:00:35	2:38	32.20%
Kiribati	Kiritimati	14:01:51	15:52:39	17:20:05	3:18	89.46%
French Polynesia	Papeete	14:32:03	15:55:59	17:05:34	2:34	33.95%
Pitcairn Islands	Adamstown	17:01:39	18:03:23	18:06:28 (sunset)	1:05	29.62%
French Polynesia	Taioha'e	15:18:10	16:42:13	17:36:21 (sunset)	2:18	68.60%

== Gallery ==
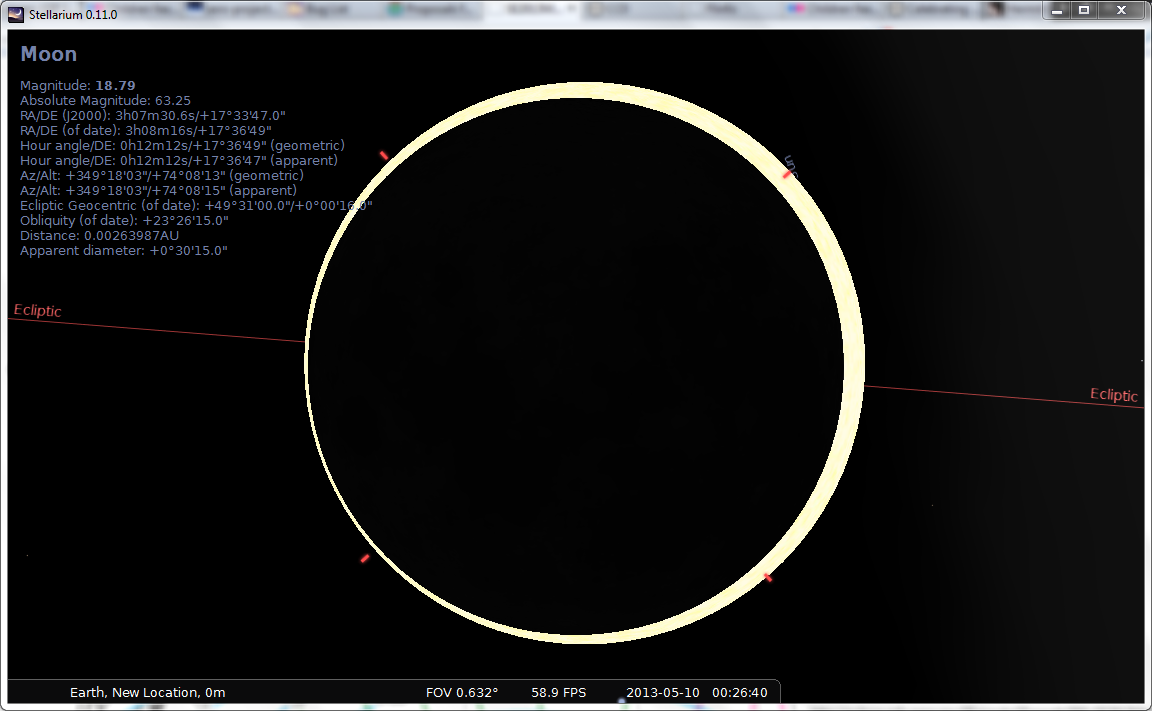
Simulation of greatest annularity east of Marakei, Kiribati.

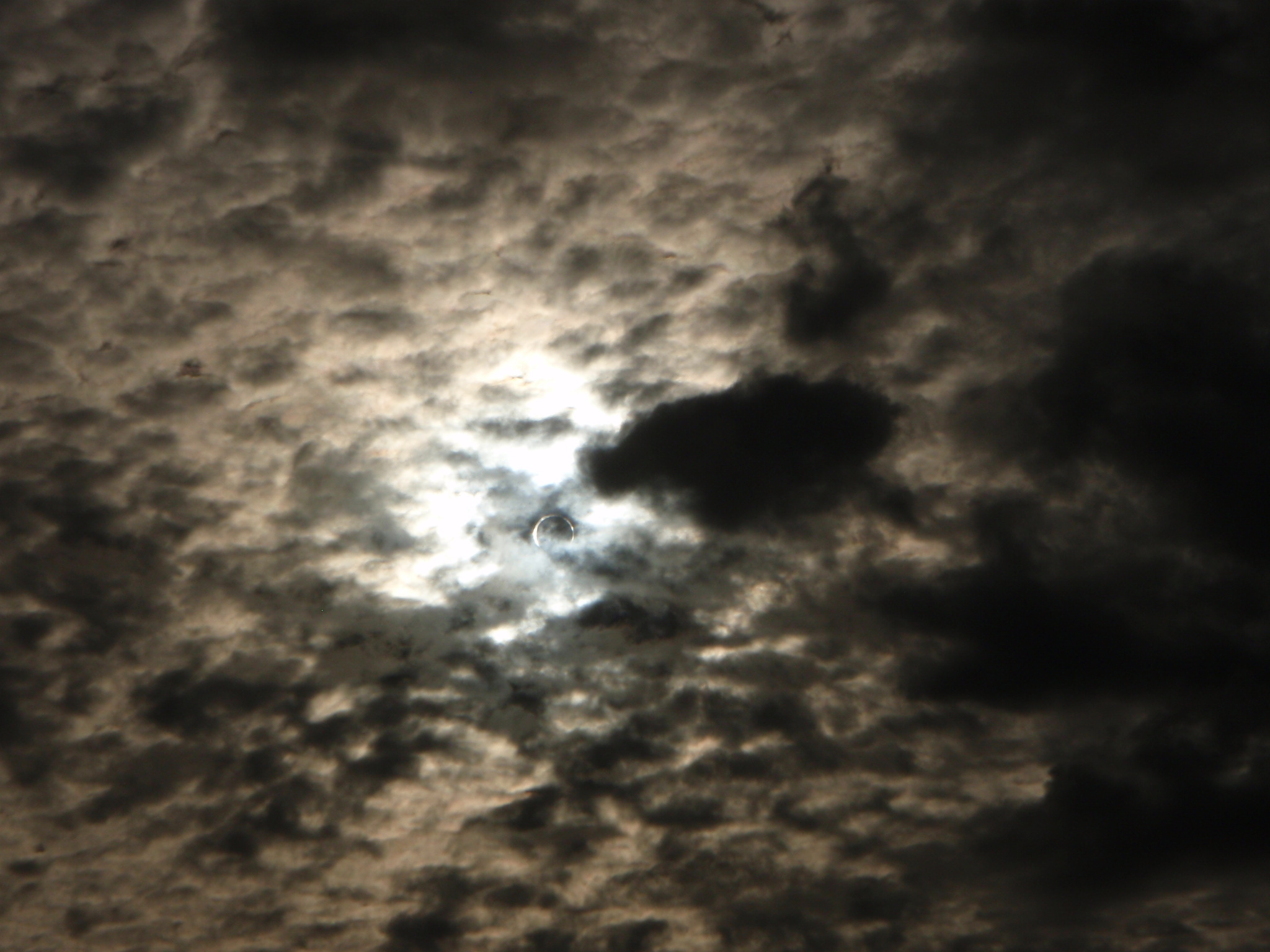
Anthony Lagoon, Australia, 22:20 GMT (May 9)

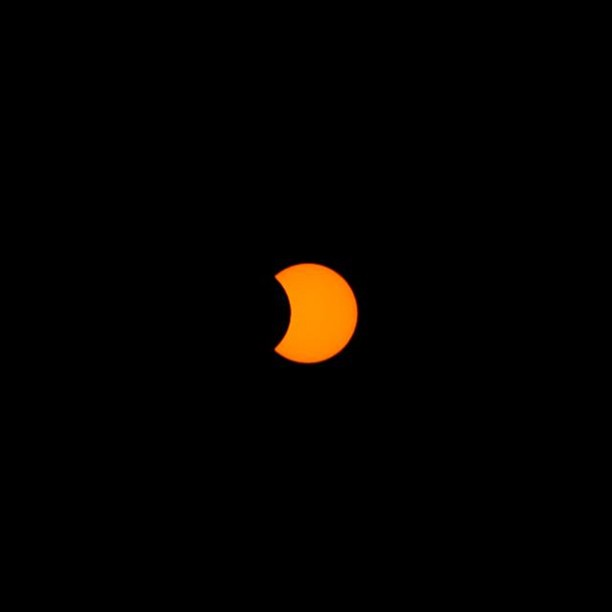
Partial from Manly Beach, New South Wales, 22:30 GMT (May 9)

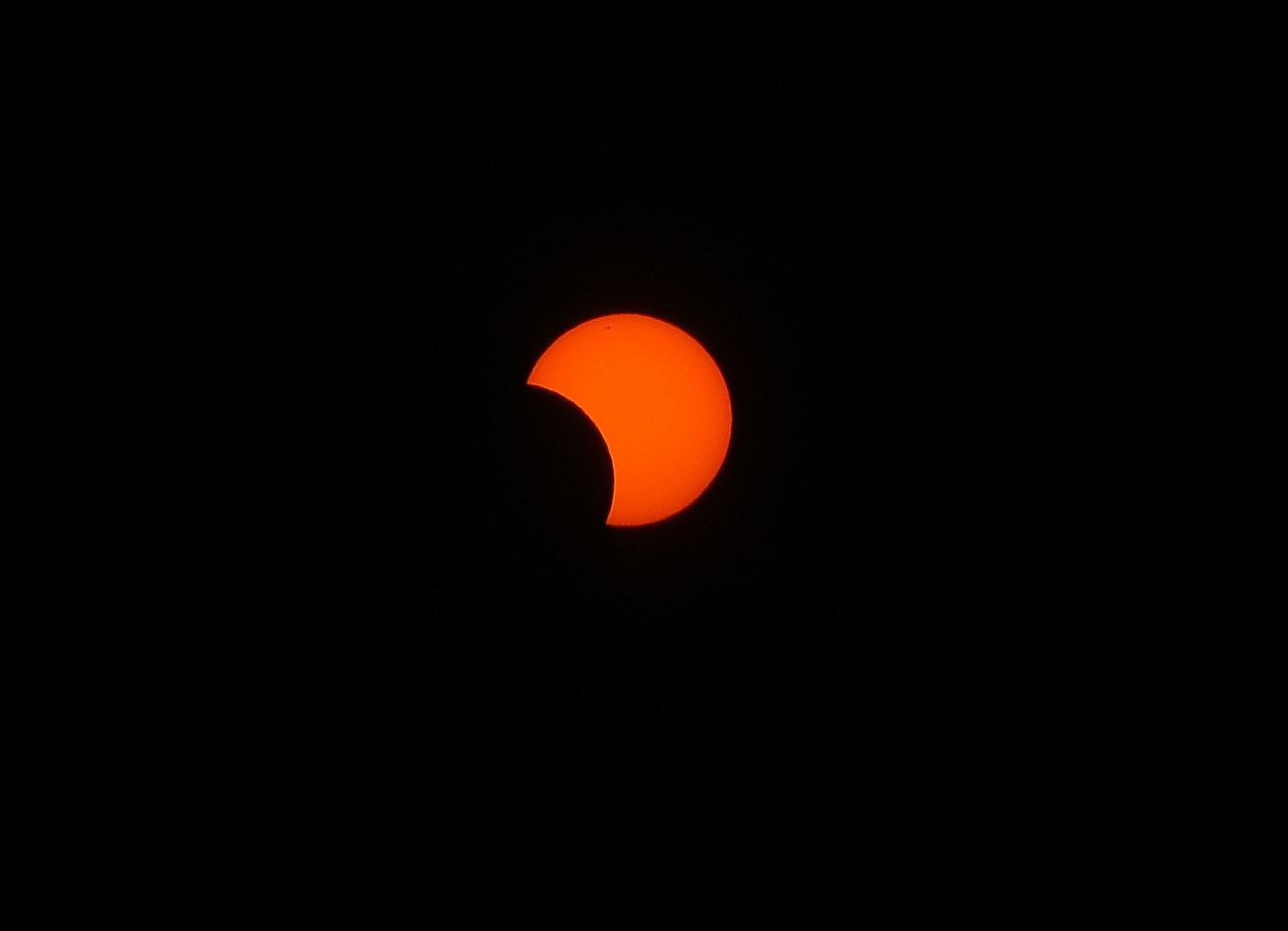
Partial from Docklands, Victoria, 22:49 GMT (May 9)

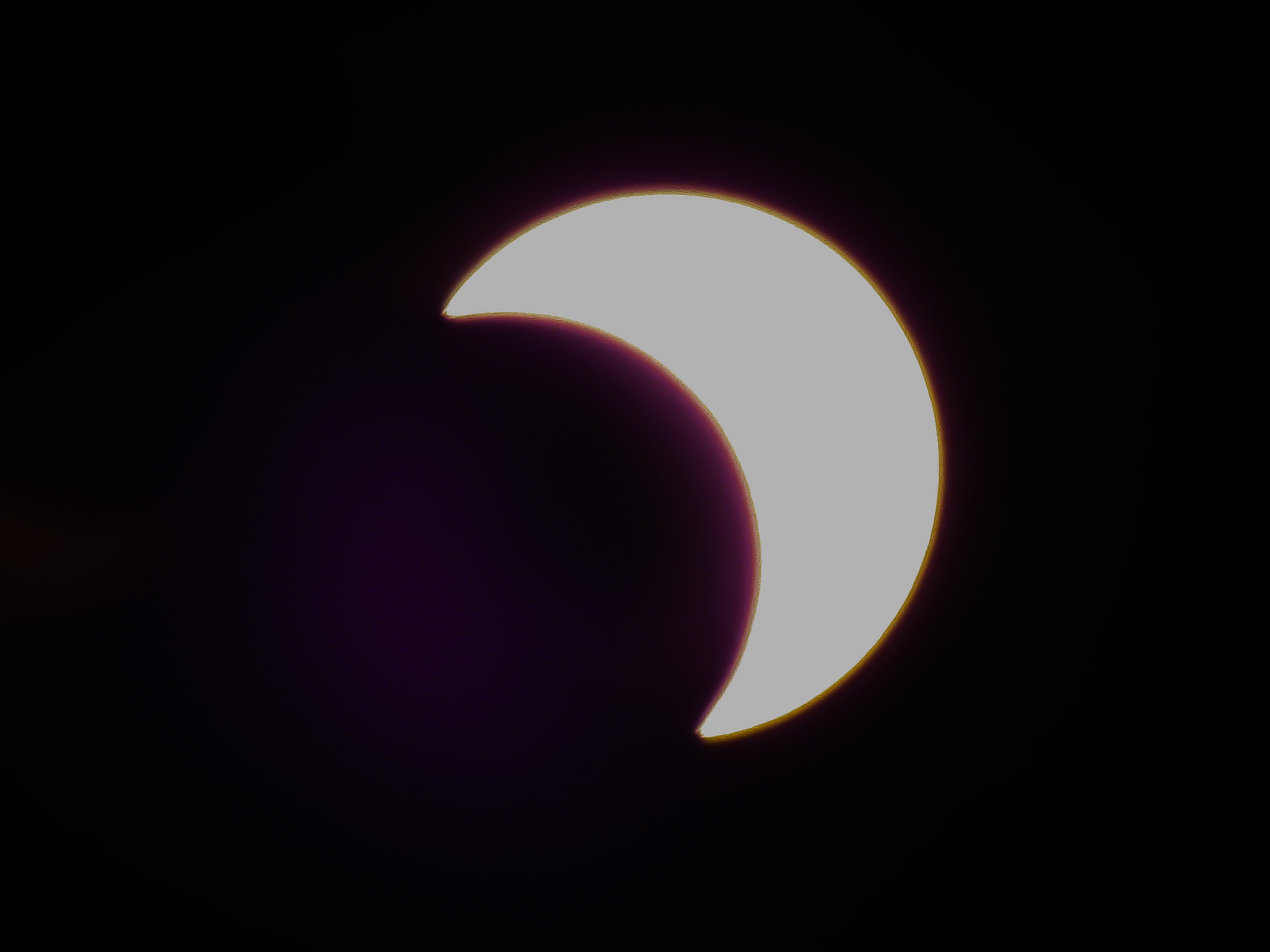
Partial from Rockhampton, Queensland, 22:57 GMT (May 9)

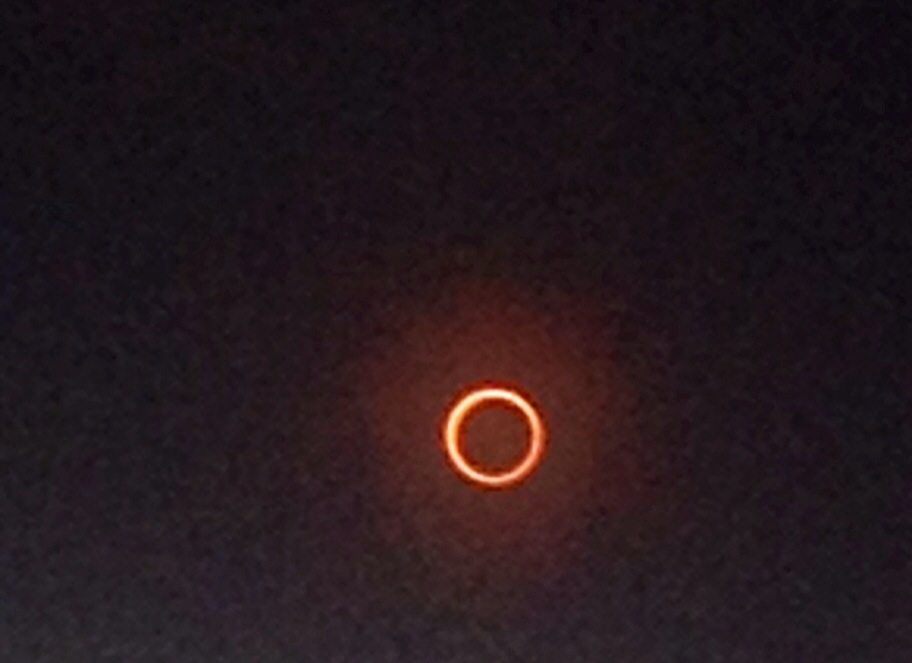
Bairiki, Kiribati, 0:15 GMT

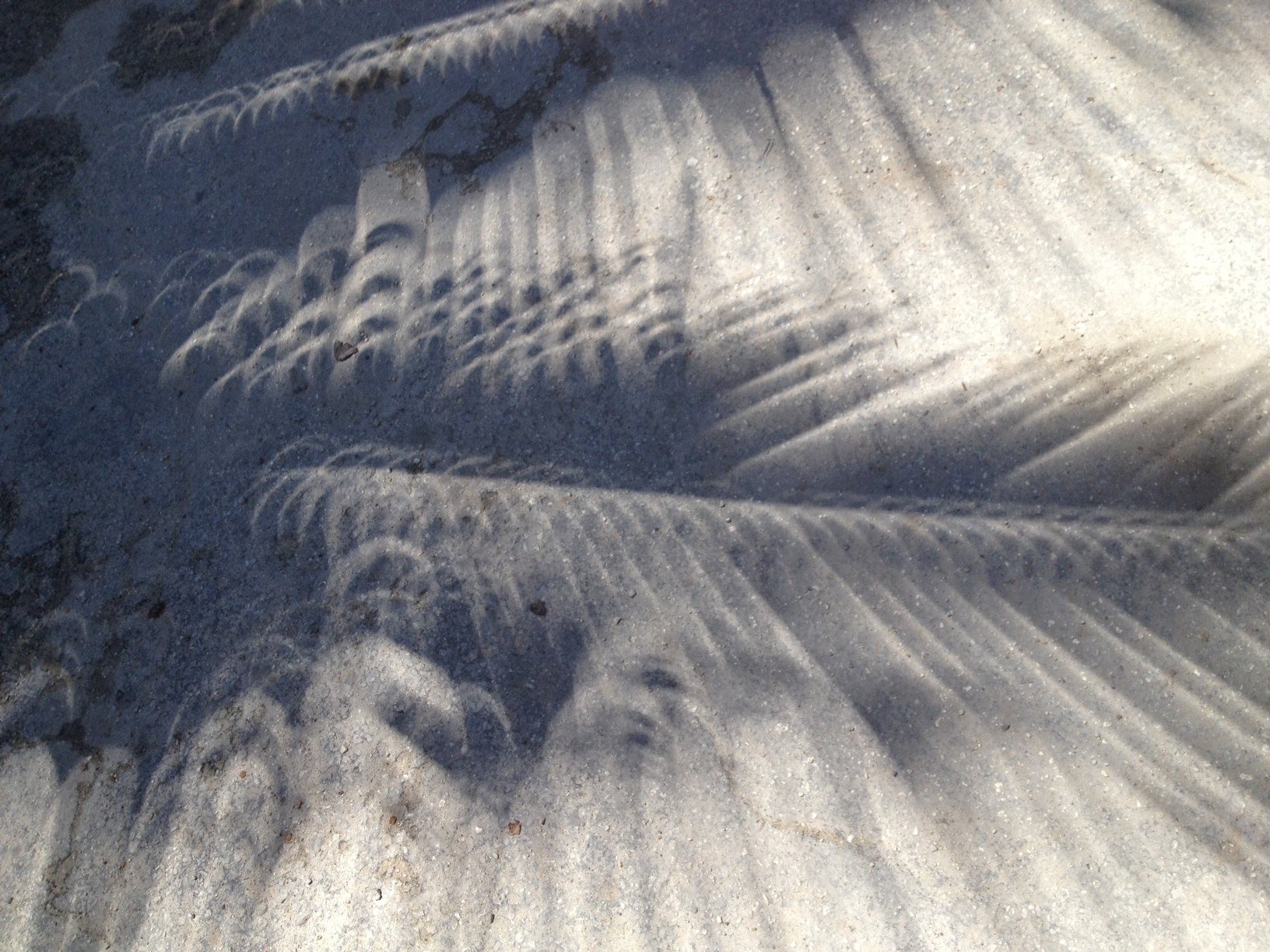
Eclipse shadows from a coconut leaf shadow. From Tarawa, Kiribati at 0:30 GMT

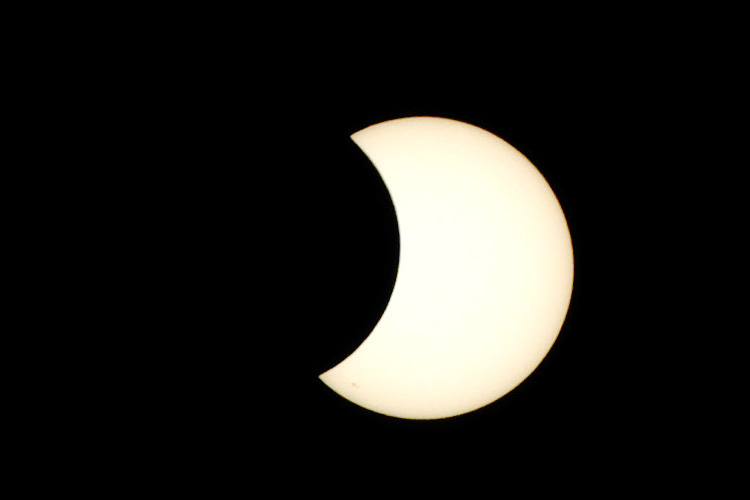
Partial from Waikiki, Hawaii, 2:12 GMT

== Eclipse details ==
Shown below are two tables displaying details about this particular solar eclipse. The first table outlines times at which the Moon's penumbra or umbra attains the specific parameter, and the second table describes various other parameters pertaining to this eclipse.

May 10, 2013 Solar Eclipse Times
Event	Time (UTC)
First Penumbral External Contact	2013 May 09 at 21:26:16.9 UTC
First Umbral External Contact	2013 May 09 at 22:31:41.4 UTC
First Central Line	2013 May 09 at 22:33:47.5 UTC
First Umbral Internal Contact	2013 May 09 at 22:35:53.8 UTC
First Penumbral Internal Contact	2013 May 09 at 23:46:27.1 UTC
Equatorial Conjunction	2013 May 10 at 00:20:48.1 UTC
Greatest Eclipse	2013 May 10 at 00:26:20.3 UTC
Ecliptic Conjunction	2013 May 10 at 00:29:30.5 UTC
Greatest Duration	2013 May 10 at 00:36:27.6 UTC
Last Penumbral Internal Contact	2013 May 10 at 01:06:21.8 UTC
Last Umbral Internal Contact	2013 May 10 at 02:16:49.4 UTC
Last Central Line	2013 May 10 at 02:18:57.6 UTC
Last Umbral External Contact	2013 May 10 at 02:21:05.6 UTC
Last Penumbral External Contact	2013 May 10 at 03:26:30.5 UTC

May 10, 2013 Solar Eclipse Parameters
Parameter	Value
Eclipse Magnitude	0.95443
Eclipse Obscuration	0.91093
Gamma	−0.26937
Sun Right Ascension	03h08m17.4s
Sun Declination	+17°36'34.3"
Sun Semi-Diameter	15'50.4"
Sun Equatorial Horizontal Parallax	08.7"
Moon Right Ascension	03h08m28.1s
Moon Declination	+17°22'06.3"
Moon Semi-Diameter	14'53.8"
Moon Equatorial Horizontal Parallax	0°54'40.4"
ΔT	67.0 s

== Eclipse season ==
This eclipse is part of an eclipse season, a period, roughly every six months, when eclipses occur. Only two (or occasionally three) eclipse seasons occur each year, and each season lasts about 35 days and repeats just short of six months (173 days) later; thus two full eclipse seasons always occur each year. Either two or three eclipses happen each eclipse season. In the sequence below, each eclipse is separated by a fortnight. The first and last eclipse in this sequence is separated by one synodic month.

Eclipse season of April–May 2013
April 25 Ascending node (full moon)	May 10 Descending node (new moon)	May 25 Ascending node (full moon)
Partial lunar eclipse Lunar Saros 112	Annular solar eclipse Solar Saros 138	Penumbral lunar eclipse Lunar Saros 150

== Related eclipses ==
=== Eclipses in 2013 ===
- A partial lunar eclipse on April 25.
- An annular solar eclipse on May 10.
- A penumbral lunar eclipse on May 25.
- A penumbral lunar eclipse on October 18.
- A hybrid solar eclipse on November 3.

=== Metonic ===
- Preceded by: Solar eclipse of July 22, 2009
- Followed by: Solar eclipse of February 26, 2017

=== Tzolkinex ===
- Preceded by: Solar eclipse of March 29, 2006
- Followed by: Solar eclipse of June 21, 2020

=== Half-Saros ===
- Preceded by: Lunar eclipse of May 4, 2004
- Followed by: Lunar eclipse of May 16, 2022

=== Tritos ===
- Preceded by: Solar eclipse of June 10, 2002
- Followed by: Solar eclipse of April 8, 2024

=== Solar Saros 138 ===
- Preceded by: Solar eclipse of April 29, 1995
- Followed by: Solar eclipse of May 21, 2031

=== Inex ===
- Preceded by: Solar eclipse of May 30, 1984
- Followed by: Solar eclipse of April 20, 2042

=== Triad ===
- Preceded by: Solar eclipse of July 9, 1926
- Followed by: Solar eclipse of March 10, 2100

=== Solar eclipses of 2011–2014 ===
This eclipse is a member of a semester series. An eclipse in a semester series of solar eclipses repeats approximately every 177 days and 4 hours (a semester) at alternating nodes of the Moon's orbit.

The partial solar eclipses on January 4, 2011 and July 1, 2011 occur in the previous lunar year eclipse set.

Solar eclipse series sets from 2011 to 2014
Descending node			Ascending node		
Saros	Map	Gamma	Saros	Map	Gamma
118 Partial in Tromsø, Norway	June 1, 2011 Partial	1.21300	123 Hinode XRT footage	November 25, 2011 Partial	−1.05359
128 Annularity in Red Bluff, CA, USA	May 20, 2012 Annular	0.48279	133 Totality in Mount Carbine, Queensland, Australia	November 13, 2012 Total	−0.37189
138 Annularity in Churchills Head, Australia	May 10, 2013 Annular	−0.26937	143 Partial in Libreville, Gabon	November 3, 2013 Hybrid	0.32715
148 Partial in Adelaide, Australia	April 29, 2014 Annular (non-central)	−0.99996	153 Partial in Minneapolis, MN, USA	October 23, 2014 Partial	1.09078

=== Saros 138 ===
This eclipse is a part of Saros series 138, repeating every 18 years, 11 days, and containing 70 events. The series started with a partial solar eclipse on June 6, 1472. It contains annular eclipses from August 31, 1598 through February 18, 2482; a hybrid eclipse on March 1, 2500; and total eclipses from March 12, 2518 through April 3, 2554. The series ends at member 70 as a partial eclipse on July 11, 2716. Its eclipses are tabulated in three columns; every third eclipse in the same column is one exeligmos apart, so they all cast shadows over approximately the same parts of the Earth.

The longest duration of annularity was produced by member 23 at 8 minutes, 2 seconds on February 11, 1869, and the longest duration of totality will be produced by member 61 at 56 seconds on April 3, 2554. All eclipses in this series occur at the Moon’s descending node of orbit.

Series members 20–41 occur between 1801 and 2200:
20	21	22
January 10, 1815	January 20, 1833	February 1, 1851
23	24	25
February 11, 1869	February 22, 1887	March 6, 1905
26	27	28
March 17, 1923	March 27, 1941	April 8, 1959
29	30	31
April 18, 1977	April 29, 1995	May 10, 2013
32	33	34
May 21, 2031	May 31, 2049	June 11, 2067
35	36	37
June 22, 2085	July 4, 2103	July 14, 2121
38	39	40
July 25, 2139	August 5, 2157	August 16, 2175
41
August 26, 2193

=== Metonic series ===
The metonic series repeats eclipses every 19 years (6939.69 days), lasting about 5 cycles. Eclipses occur in nearly the same calendar date. In addition, the octon subseries repeats 1/5 of that or every 3.8 years (1387.94 days). All eclipses in this table occur at the Moon's descending node.

21 eclipse events between July 22, 1971 and July 22, 2047
July 22	May 9–11	February 26–27	December 14–15	October 2–3
116	118	120	122	124
July 22, 1971	May 11, 1975	February 26, 1979	December 15, 1982	October 3, 1986
126	128	130	132	134
July 22, 1990	May 10, 1994	February 26, 1998	December 14, 2001	October 3, 2005
136	138	140	142	144
July 22, 2009	May 10, 2013	February 26, 2017	December 14, 2020	October 2, 2024
146	148	150	152	154
July 22, 2028	May 9, 2032	February 27, 2036	December 15, 2039	October 3, 2043
156
July 22, 2047

=== Tritos series ===
This eclipse is a part of a tritos cycle, repeating at alternating nodes every 135 synodic months (≈ 3986.63 days, or 11 years minus 1 month). Their appearance and longitude are irregular due to a lack of synchronization with the anomalistic month (period of perigee), but groupings of 3 tritos cycles (≈ 33 years minus 3 months) come close (≈ 434.044 anomalistic months), so eclipses are similar in these groupings.

Series members between 1801 and 2200
December 21, 1805 (Saros 119)	November 19, 1816 (Saros 120)	October 20, 1827 (Saros 121)	September 18, 1838 (Saros 122)	August 18, 1849 (Saros 123)
July 18, 1860 (Saros 124)	June 18, 1871 (Saros 125)	May 17, 1882 (Saros 126)	April 16, 1893 (Saros 127)	March 17, 1904 (Saros 128)
February 14, 1915 (Saros 129)	January 14, 1926 (Saros 130)	December 13, 1936 (Saros 131)	November 12, 1947 (Saros 132)	October 12, 1958 (Saros 133)
September 11, 1969 (Saros 134)	August 10, 1980 (Saros 135)	July 11, 1991 (Saros 136)	June 10, 2002 (Saros 137)	May 10, 2013 (Saros 138)
April 8, 2024 (Saros 139)	March 9, 2035 (Saros 140)	February 5, 2046 (Saros 141)	January 5, 2057 (Saros 142)	December 6, 2067 (Saros 143)
November 4, 2078 (Saros 144)	October 4, 2089 (Saros 145)	September 4, 2100 (Saros 146)	August 4, 2111 (Saros 147)	July 4, 2122 (Saros 148)
June 3, 2133 (Saros 149)	May 3, 2144 (Saros 150)	April 2, 2155 (Saros 151)	March 2, 2166 (Saros 152)	January 29, 2177 (Saros 153)
December 29, 2187 (Saros 154)	November 28, 2198 (Saros 155)			

=== Inex series ===
This eclipse is a part of the long period inex cycle, repeating at alternating nodes, every 358 synodic months (≈ 10,571.95 days, or 29 years minus 20 days). Their appearance and longitude are irregular due to a lack of synchronization with the anomalistic month (period of perigee). However, groupings of 3 inex cycles (≈ 87 years minus 2 months) comes close (≈ 1,151.02 anomalistic months), so eclipses are similar in these groupings.

Series members between 1801 and 2200
September 28, 1810 (Saros 131)	September 7, 1839 (Saros 132)	August 18, 1868 (Saros 133)
July 29, 1897 (Saros 134)	July 9, 1926 (Saros 135)	June 20, 1955 (Saros 136)
May 30, 1984 (Saros 137)	May 10, 2013 (Saros 138)	April 20, 2042 (Saros 139)
March 31, 2071 (Saros 140)	March 10, 2100 (Saros 141)	February 18, 2129 (Saros 142)
January 30, 2158 (Saros 143)	January 9, 2187 (Saros 144)	
