= Lunar Saros 150 =

Eclipse cycle of the moon

Member 1
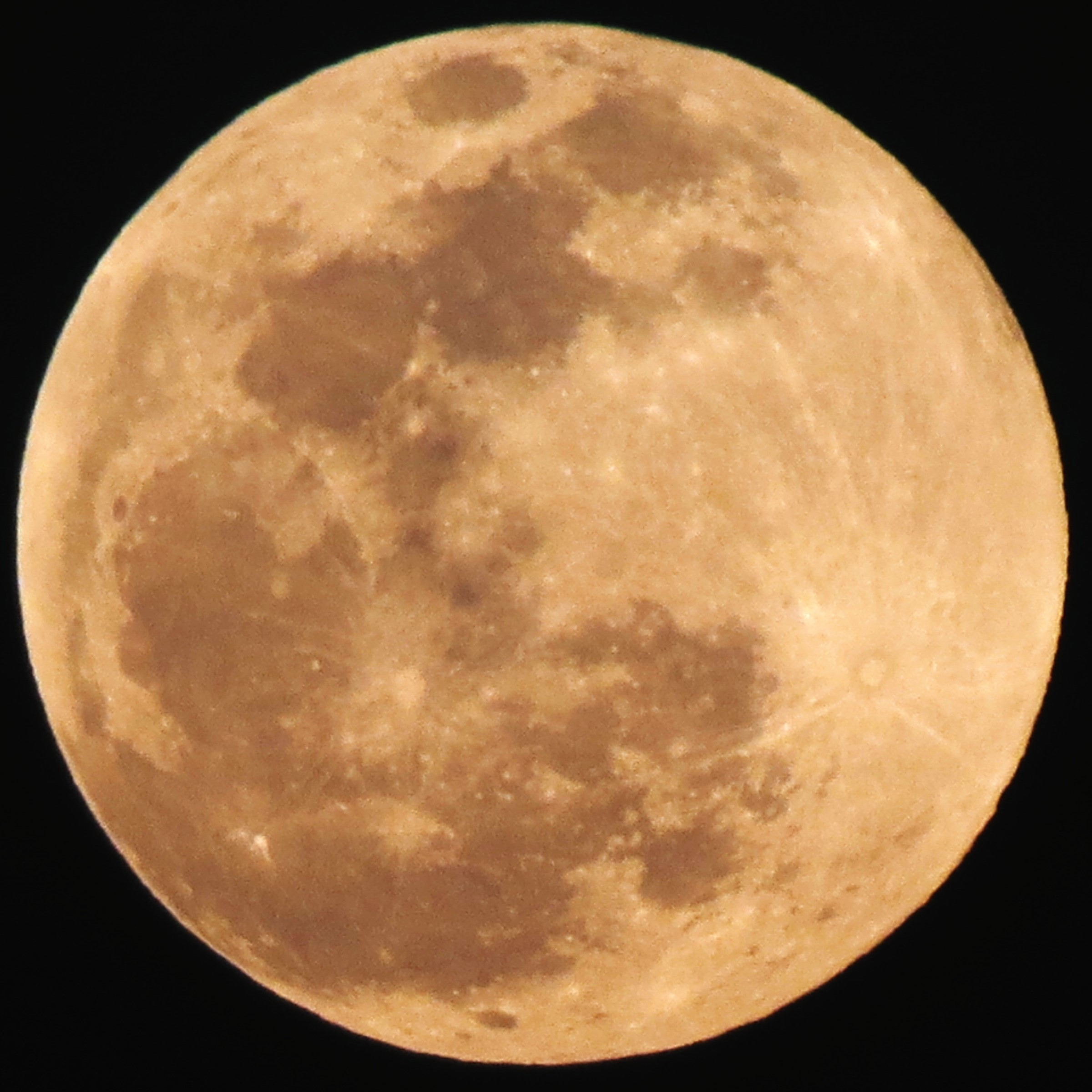
May 25, 2013

Saros cycle series 150 for lunar eclipses occurs at the moon's ascending node, 18 years 11 and 1/3 days. It contains 71 events.

This lunar saros is linked to Solar Saros 157.

Cat.	Saros	Mem	Date	Time UT (hr:mn)	Type	Gamma	Magnitude	Duration (min)			Contacts UT (hr:mn)						Chart
Cat.	Saros	Mem	Date	Greatest	Type	Gamma	Magnitude	Pen.	Par.	Tot.	P1	P4	U1	U2	U3	U4	Chart
09680	150	1	2013 May 25	4:11:06	Penumbral	1.5350	-0.9335	33.6			3:54:18	4:27:54					
09721	150	2	2031 Jun 05	11:45:17	Penumbral	1.4731	-0.8199	95.6			10:57:29	12:33:05					
09761	150	3	2049 Jun 15	19:14:12	Penumbral	1.4068	-0.6985	132.0			18:08:12	20:20:12					
09802	150	4	2067 Jun 27	2:41:06	Penumbral	1.3394	-0.5753	159.8			1:21:12	4:01:00					
09843	150	5	2085 Jul 07	10:04:40	Penumbral	1.2694	-0.4478	183.5			8:32:55	11:36:25					
09885	150	6	2103 Jul 19	17:28:43	Penumbral	1.2002	-0.3220	203.4			15:47:01	19:10:25					
09927	150	7	2121 Jul 30	0:52:44	Penumbral	1.1312	-0.1968	220.8			23:02:20	2:43:08					
09970	150	8	2139 Aug 10	8:18:10	Penumbral	1.0638	-0.0749	236.0			6:20:10	10:16:10					
10014	150	9	2157 Aug 20	15:46:36	Partial	0.9992	0.0415	249.2	45.1		13:42:00	17:51:12	15:24:03			16:09:09	
10057	150	10	2175 Aug 31	23:19:04	Partial	0.9385	0.1506	260.6	84.8		21:08:46	1:29:22	22:36:40			0:01:28	
10100	150	11	2193 Sep 11	6:57:00	Partial	0.8828	0.2505	270.4	108.1		4:41:48	9:12:12	6:02:57			7:51:03	
10143	150	12	2211 Sep 23	14:39:33	Partial	0.8314	0.3421	278.9	124.9		12:20:06	16:59:00	13:37:06			15:42:00	
10187	150	13	2229 Oct 03	22:29:31	Partial	0.7865	0.4216	286.0	137.4		20:06:31	0:52:31	21:20:49			23:38:13	
10232	150	14	2247 Oct 15	6:25:30	Partial	0.7471	0.4911	292.2	147.1		3:59:24	8:51:36	5:11:57			7:39:03	
10278	150	15	2265 Oct 25	14:28:59	Partial	0.7146	0.5480	297.3	154.4		12:00:20	16:57:38	13:11:47			15:46:11	
10324	150	16	2283 Nov 05	22:38:43	Partial	0.6877	0.5945	301.6	160.1		20:07:55	1:09:31	21:18:40			23:58:46	
10370	150	17	2301 Nov 17	6:56:02	Partial	0.6678	0.6283	305.1	164.1		4:23:29	9:28:35	5:33:59			8:18:05	
10416	150	18	2319 Nov 28	15:18:35	Partial	0.6528	0.6533	308.0	167.1		12:44:35	17:52:35	13:55:02			16:42:08	
10462	150	19	2337 Dec 08	23:45:53	Partial	0.6423	0.6702	310.4	169.2		21:10:41	2:21:05	22:21:17			1:10:29	
10508	150	20	2355 Dec 20	8:16:43	Partial	0.6355	0.6805	312.4	170.6		5:40:31	10:52:55	6:51:25			9:42:01	
10554	150	21	2373 Dec 30	16:50:27	Partial	0.6322	0.6848	314.0	171.5		14:13:27	19:27:27	15:24:42			18:16:12	
10598	150	22	2392 Jan 11	1:23:56	Partial	0.6291	0.6889	315.6	172.4		22:46:08	4:01:44	23:57:44			2:50:08	
10643	150	23	2410 Jan 21	9:56:47	Partial	0.6263	0.6926	317.0	173.2		7:18:17	12:35:17	8:30:11			11:23:23	
10687	150	24	2428 Feb 01	18:26:27	Partial	0.6218	0.6999	318.6	174.4		15:47:09	21:05:45	16:59:15			19:53:39	
10731	150	25	2446 Feb 12	2:53:07	Partial	0.6155	0.7106	320.3	175.9		0:12:58	5:33:16	1:25:10			4:21:04	
10774	150	26	2464 Feb 23	11:12:18	Partial	0.6041	0.7311	322.4	178.3		8:31:06	13:53:30	9:43:09			12:41:27	
10816	150	27	2482 Mar 05	19:26:14	Partial	0.5889	0.7585	324.9	181.3		16:43:47	22:08:41	17:55:35			20:56:53	
10857	150	28	2500 Mar 17	3:30:27	Partial	0.5665	0.7996	327.9	185.4		0:46:30	6:14:24	1:57:45			5:03:09	
10898	150	29	2518 Mar 28	11:27:42	Partial	0.5390	0.8498	331.2	190.1		8:42:06	14:13:18	9:52:39			13:02:45	
10938	150	30	2536 Apr 07	19:13:18	Partial	0.5027	0.9165	335.1	195.6		16:25:45	22:00:51	17:35:30			20:51:06	
10980	150	31	2554 Apr 19	2:51:33	Partial	0.4610	0.9929	339.2	201.4		0:01:57	5:41:09	1:10:51			4:32:15	
11022	150	32	2572 Apr 29	10:18:28	Total	0.4106	1.0853	343.6	207.5	45.6	7:26:40	13:10:16	8:34:43	9:55:40	10:41:16	12:02:13	
11062	150	33	2590 May 10	17:36:56	Total	0.3540	1.1891	347.9	213.5	65.8	14:42:59	20:30:53	15:50:11	17:04:02	18:09:50	19:23:41	
11102	150	34	2608 May 22	0:45:18	Total	0.2896	1.3069	352.1	219.1	80.7	21:49:15	3:41:21	22:55:45	0:04:57	1:25:39	2:34:51	
11142	150	35	2626 Jun 02	7:46:44	Total	0.2203	1.4338	355.8	223.9	91.7	4:48:50	10:44:38	5:54:47	7:00:53	8:32:35	9:38:41	
11183	150	36	2644 Jun 12	14:40:34	Total	0.1454	1.5705	359.0	227.7	99.4	11:41:04	17:40:04	12:46:43	13:50:52	15:30:16	16:34:25	
11224	150	37	2662 Jun 23	21:28:04	Total	0.0662	1.7152	361.5	230.3	104.0	18:27:19	0:28:49	19:32:55	20:36:04	22:20:04	23:23:13	
11267	150	38	2680 Jul 04	4:11:07	Total	-0.0161	1.8060	363.0	231.3	105.3	1:09:37	7:12:37	2:15:28	3:18:28	5:03:46	6:06:46	
11309	150	39	2698 Jul 15	10:51:12	Total	-0.1003	1.6503	363.5	230.7	102.9	7:49:27	13:52:57	8:55:51	9:59:45	11:42:39	12:46:33	
11352	150	40	2716 Jul 26	17:28:56	Total	-0.1855	1.4926	363.0	228.4	96.4	14:27:26	20:30:26	15:34:44	16:40:44	18:17:08	19:23:08	
11394	150	41	2734 Aug 07	0:06:17	Total	-0.2703	1.3353	361.3	224.2	84.8	21:05:38	3:06:56	22:14:11	23:23:53	0:48:41	1:58:23	
11437	150	42	2752 Aug 17	6:45:06	Total	-0.3533	1.1814	358.7	218.2	66.0	3:45:45	9:44:27	4:56:00	6:12:06	7:18:06	8:34:12	
11482	150	43	2770 Aug 28	13:27:15	Total	-0.4330	1.0331	355.1	210.4	29.6	10:29:42	16:24:48	11:42:03	13:12:27	13:42:03	15:12:27	
11527	150	44	2788 Sep 07	20:12:11	Partial	-0.5098	0.8901	350.6	200.9		17:16:53	23:07:29	18:31:44			21:52:38	
11573	150	45	2806 Sep 19	3:03:31	Partial	-0.5808	0.7577	345.6	190.1		0:10:43	5:56:19	1:28:28			4:38:34	
11620	150	46	2824 Sep 29	10:00:55	Partial	-0.6461	0.6356	340.2	178.0		7:10:49	12:51:01	8:31:55			11:29:55	
11667	150	47	2842 Oct 10	17:06:32	Partial	-0.7043	0.5264	334.7	165.2		14:19:11	19:53:53	15:43:56			18:29:08	
11713	150	48	2860 Oct 21	0:18:17	Partial	-0.7571	0.4273	329.2	151.3		21:33:41	3:02:53	23:02:38			1:33:56	
11759	150	49	2878 Nov 01	7:39:31	Partial	-0.8017	0.3432	324.0	137.6		4:57:31	10:21:31	6:30:43			8:48:19	
11805	150	50	2896 Nov 11	15:07:55	Partial	-0.8401	0.2708	319.3	123.6		12:28:16	17:47:34	14:06:07			16:09:43	
11850	150	51	2914 Nov 23	22:44:30	Partial	-0.8712	0.2118	315.3	110.4		20:06:51	1:22:09	21:49:18			23:39:42	
11895	150	52	2932 Dec 04	6:27:49	Partial	-0.8966	0.1636	311.8	97.8		3:51:55	9:03:43	5:38:55			7:16:43	
11940	150	53	2950 Dec 15	14:18:10	Partial	-0.9159	0.1269	309.1	86.6		11:43:37	16:52:43	13:34:52			15:01:28	
11987	150	54	2968 Dec 25	22:13:36	Partial	-0.9309	0.0984	306.9	76.6		19:40:09	0:47:03	21:35:18			22:51:54	
12031	150	55	2987 Jan 06	6:11:45	Partial	-0.9434	0.0748	304.9	67.0		3:39:18	8:44:12	5:38:15			6:45:15	

== See also ==
- List of lunar eclipses
  - List of Saros series for lunar eclipses
