= Solar eclipse of May 9, 1948 =

20th-century annular solar eclipse

- Annular eclipse
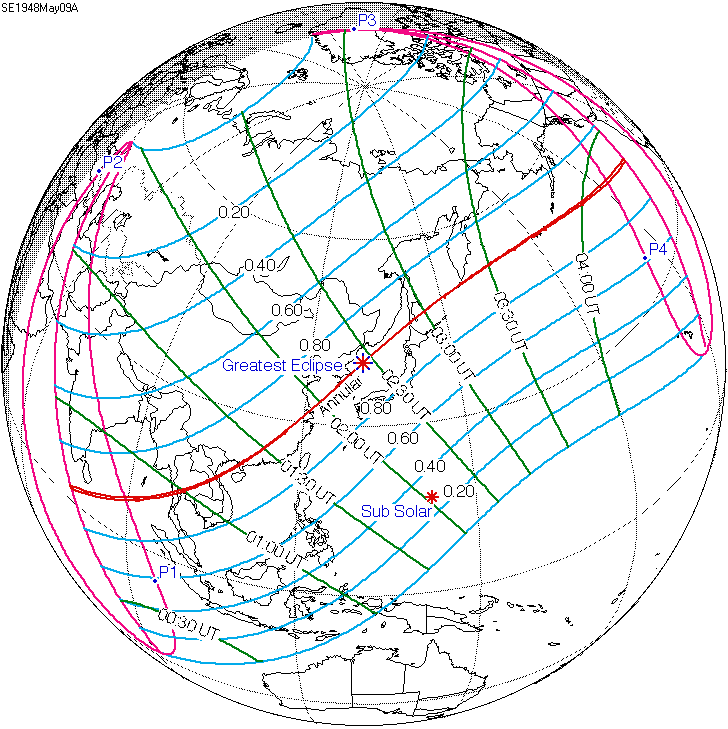
- Map
- Gamma: 0.4133
- Magnitude: 0.9999

Maximum eclipse
- Duration: 0 s (0 min 0 s)
- Coordinates: 39.8°N 131.2°E

Times (UTC)
- Greatest eclipse: 2:26:04

References
- Saros: 137 (32 of 70)
- Catalog # (SE5000): 9394

External image
- http://xjubier.free.fr/en/site_pages/solar_eclipses/ASE_19480509_pg01.html

An annular solar eclipse occurred at the Moon's ascending node of orbit between Saturday, May 8 and Sunday, May 9, 1948, with a magnitude of 0.9999. A solar eclipse occurs when the Moon passes between Earth and the Sun, thereby totally or partly obscuring the image of the Sun for a viewer on Earth. An annular solar eclipse occurs when the Moon's apparent diameter is smaller than the Sun's, blocking most of the Sun's light and causing the Sun to look like an annulus (ring). An annular eclipse appears as a partial eclipse over a region of the Earth thousands of kilometres wide. The Moon's apparent diameter was near the average diameter because it occurred 7 days after apogee (on May 2, 1948, at 2:00 UTC) and 6.7 days before perigee (on May 15, 1948, at 17:10 UTC).

The moon's apparent diameter was only 0.006% smaller than the Sun's, so this was an annular solar eclipse. The path width of this large annular solar eclipse, was about 200 meters and lasted only 0.3 seconds. The large annular eclipse covered over 99% of the Sun, creating a dramatic spectacle for observers in only an extremely narrow strip; however, it was fleeting, lasting just moments at the point of maximum eclipse.

Annularity was visible from Car Nicobar, the northernmost of the Nicobar Islands, and Burma, Siam (now renamed to Thailand) including Bangkok, French Indochina (the part now belonging to Laos), North Vietnam (now belonging to Vietnam), China, South Korea, Rebun Island in Japan, Kuril Islands in the Soviet Union (now belonging to Russia) on May 9, and Alaska on May 8. A partial eclipse was visible for parts of South Asia, Southeast Asia, East Asia, Northeast Asia, Alaska, and northwest Canada.

This was the first of four central solar eclipses visible from Bangkok from 1948 to 1958, where it is extremely rare for a large city to witness four central solar eclipses within 10 years.

== Observations ==
During this eclipse, the apex of the Moon's umbral cone was very close to the Earth's surface, and the magnitude was very large. The edges of the Moon and the Sun were very close to each other as seen from the Earth. Baily's beads on the lunar limb, which are usually only visible during a total solar eclipse, could also be seen. Therefore this eclipse was also an excellent opportunity to measure the size and shape of the Earth, as well as the mountains and valleys on the lunar limb. The National Geographic Society sent 7 teams respectively to Myeik in Burma, Bangkok in Siam, Wukang County (now belonging to Deqing County, Zhejiang) in China, Onyang-eup of Asan-gun (now Onyang-dong, Asan City) in South Korea, Rebun Island in Japan, Adak Island in Alaska, as well as from the air onboard a Boeing B-29 Superfortress departing from Shemya Island. The scale of this observation was larger than ever before. In the end, the teams from the air and on Rebun Island got the best results with good weather conditions, while the results in Myeik and Bangkok were relatively good, Adak Island still somewhat valuable, Onyang-eup missing many goals, and Wukang with the worst results where there was rain during the eclipse. It was shortly after the end of World War II, and the observation in Japan showed friendship among the science community. Kafuka, one of the two villages on the island, supported the observation team, and a Solar Eclipse Observation Monument was built in 1954 to commemorate it. The monument was first erected in Kitousu, the center of the observation site. It was moved to Itsukushima Shrine in 2003, across the sea facing Rishirifuji.

Prior to it, the two hybrid solar eclipses of April 17, 1912 and April 28, 1930, also belonging to Solar Saros 137, also occurred with a magnitude close to 1. Observations were made near Paris, France and Camptonville, California respectively. There was an opportunity to make similar observations during the annular solar eclipse of May 20, 1966 in Greece and Turkey, also belonging to the same solar Saros cycle.

The Institute of Astronomy of the Academia Sinica (predecessor of Purple Mountain Observatory), Department of Physics of National Central University and Bureau of Surveying of the Ministry of National Defense also formed a team. The initial plan was to go to Guangdong, far from the observation site of the American team, hoping that the two teams would not be affected by bad weather at the same time. However after checking the weather, traffic and law and order conditions near Guangzhou, Hangzhou and Suzhou, the team finally decided on Cibiwu in Yuhang County. The decision was made based on the fact that meteorological data showed bad conditions generally across the whole Jiangnan in May, within the East Asian rainy season, and funding is limited so travel could not be made for a long distance. Besides, Xujiahui (Zi-Ka-Wei) Observatory estimated that there was 70% hope in Cibiwu, and it is close to the observation site of the American team, allowing the Chinese team to see the equipment of the American team for future reference. Zhang Yuzhe, director of the Institute of Astronomy, visited the United States and Canada to study the spectrum of eclipsing binaries in 1946. However, the Ministry of Foreign Affairs of the Republic of China stopped funding him the return trip back to China. He took the opportunity of joining the observation team to return to China in March 1948, and observed it together with Chen Zungui. In the end, due to the weather conditions, just like the American team which traveled to China, the Chinese team also only measured changes in the luminosity of the sun. The Qingdao Observatory, Sun Yat-sen University Observatory and the Department of Physics of Tongji University also made observations.

== Eclipse details ==
Shown below are two tables displaying details about this particular solar eclipse. The first table outlines times at which the Moon's penumbra or umbra attains the specific parameter, and the second table describes various other parameters pertaining to this eclipse.

May 9, 1948 Solar Eclipse Times
| Event | Time (UTC) |
|---|---|
| First Penumbral External Contact | 1948 May 8 at 23:40:23.2 UTC |
| First Umbral External Contact | 1948 May 9 at 00:44:35.7 UTC |
| First Central Line | 1948 May 9 at 00:45:07.7 UTC |
| Greatest Duration | 1948 May 9 at 00:45:07.7 UTC |
| First Umbral Internal Contact | 1948 May 9 at 00:45:39.6 UTC |
| First Penumbral Internal Contact | 1948 May 9 at 02:06:53.9 UTC |
| Greatest Eclipse | 1948 May 9 at 02:26:03.6 UTC |
| Ecliptic Conjunction | 1948 May 9 at 02:30:35.8 UTC |
| Equatorial Conjunction | 1948 May 9 at 02:44:18.7 UTC |
| Last Penumbral Internal Contact | 1948 May 9 at 02:44:48.6 UTC |
| Last Umbral Internal Contact | 1948 May 9 at 04:06:18.3 UTC |
| Last Central Line | 1948 May 9 at 04:06:47.3 UTC |
| Last Umbral External Contact | 1948 May 9 at 04:07:16.3 UTC |
| Last Penumbral External Contact | 1948 May 9 at 05:11:30.1 UTC |

May 9, 1948 Solar Eclipse Parameters
| Parameter | Value |
|---|---|
| Eclipse Magnitude | 0.99994 |
| Eclipse Obscuration | 0.99989 |
| Gamma | 0.41332 |
| Sun Right Ascension | 03h03m37.8s |
| Sun Declination | +17°18'09.3" |
| Sun Semi-Diameter | 15'50.3" |
| Sun Equatorial Horizontal Parallax | 08.7" |
| Moon Right Ascension | 03h03m01.1s |
| Moon Declination | +17°40'05.5" |
| Moon Semi-Diameter | 15'36.6" |
| Moon Equatorial Horizontal Parallax | 0°57'17.4" |
| ΔT | 28.4 s |

== Eclipse season ==
This eclipse is part of an eclipse season, a period, roughly every six months, when eclipses occur. Only two (or occasionally three) eclipse seasons occur each year, and each season lasts about 35 days and repeats just short of six months (173 days) later; thus two full eclipse seasons always occur each year. Either two or three eclipses happen each eclipse season. In the sequence below, each eclipse is separated by a fortnight.

Eclipse season of April–May 1948
| April 23 Descending node (full moon) | May 9 Ascending node (new moon) |
|---|---|
| Partial lunar eclipse Lunar Saros 111 | Annular solar eclipse Solar Saros 137 |

== Related eclipses ==
=== Eclipses in 1948 ===
- A partial lunar eclipse on April 23.
- An annular solar eclipse on May 9.
- A penumbral lunar eclipse on October 18.
- A total solar eclipse on November 1.

=== Metonic ===
- Preceded by: Solar eclipse of July 20, 1944
- Followed by: Solar eclipse of February 25, 1952

=== Tzolkinex ===
- Preceded by: Solar eclipse of March 27, 1941
- Followed by: Solar eclipse of June 20, 1955

=== Half-Saros ===
- Preceded by: Lunar eclipse of May 3, 1939
- Followed by: Lunar eclipse of May 13, 1957

=== Tritos ===
- Preceded by: Solar eclipse of June 8, 1937
- Followed by: Solar eclipse of April 8, 1959

=== Solar Saros 137 ===
- Preceded by: Solar eclipse of April 28, 1930
- Followed by: Solar eclipse of May 20, 1966

=== Inex ===
- Preceded by: Solar eclipse of May 29, 1919
- Followed by: Solar eclipse of April 18, 1977

=== Triad ===
- Preceded by: Solar eclipse of July 8, 1861
- Followed by: Solar eclipse of March 9, 2035

=== Solar eclipses of 1946–1949 ===
This eclipse is a member of a semester series. An eclipse in a semester series of solar eclipses repeats approximately every 177 days and 4 hours (a semester) at alternating nodes of the Moon's orbit.

The partial solar eclipses on January 3, 1946 and June 29, 1946 occur in the previous lunar year eclipse set.

Solar eclipse series sets from 1946 to 1949
| Ascending node | | | Descending node | | |
| Saros | Map | Gamma | Saros | Map | Gamma |
| 117 | May 30, 1946 Partial | −1.0711 | 122 | November 23, 1946 Partial | 1.105 |
| 127 | May 20, 1947 Total | −0.3528 | 132 | November 12, 1947 Annular | 0.3743 |
| 137 | May 9, 1948 Annular | 0.4133 | 142 | November 1, 1948 Total | −0.3517 |
| 147 | April 28, 1949 Partial | 1.2068 | 152 | October 21, 1949 Partial | −1.027 |

=== Saros 137 ===
This eclipse is a part of Saros series 137, repeating every 18 years, 11 days, and containing 70 events. The series started with a partial solar eclipse on May 25, 1389. It contains total eclipses from August 20, 1533 through December 6, 1695; the first set of hybrid eclipses from December 17, 1713 through February 11, 1804; the first set of annular eclipses from February 21, 1822 through March 25, 1876; the second set of hybrid eclipses from April 6, 1894 through April 28, 1930; and the second set of annular eclipses from May 9, 1948 through April 13, 2507. The series ends at member 70 as a partial eclipse on June 28, 2633. Its eclipses are tabulated in three columns; every third eclipse in the same column is one exeligmos apart, so they all cast shadows over approximately the same parts of the Earth.

The longest duration of totality was produced by member 11 at 2 minutes, 55 seconds on September 10, 1569, and the longest duration of annularity will be produced by member 59 at 7 minutes, 5 seconds on February 28, 2435. All eclipses in this series occur at the Moon’s ascending node of orbit.

Series members 24–46 occur between 1801 and 2200:
| 24 | 25 | 26 |
|---|---|---|
| February 11, 1804 | February 21, 1822 | March 4, 1840 |
| 27 | 28 | 29 |
| March 15, 1858 | March 25, 1876 | April 6, 1894 |
| 30 | 31 | 32 |
| April 17, 1912 | April 28, 1930 | May 9, 1948 |
| 33 | 34 | 35 |
| May 20, 1966 | May 30, 1984 | June 10, 2002 |
| 36 | 37 | 38 |
| June 21, 2020 | July 2, 2038 | July 12, 2056 |
| 39 | 40 | 41 |
| July 24, 2074 | August 3, 2092 | August 15, 2110 |
| 42 | 43 | 44 |
| August 25, 2128 | September 6, 2146 | September 16, 2164 |
| 45 | 46 | |
| September 27, 2182 | October 9, 2200 | |

=== Metonic series ===
The metonic series repeats eclipses every 19 years (6939.69 days), lasting about 5 cycles. Eclipses occur in nearly the same calendar date. In addition, the octon subseries repeats 1/5 of that or every 3.8 years (1387.94 days). All eclipses in this table occur at the Moon's ascending node.

22 eclipse events between December 13, 1898 and July 20, 1982
| December 13–14 | October 1–2 | July 20–21 | May 9 | February 24–25 |
| 111 | 113 | 115 | 117 | 119 |
|---|---|---|---|---|
| December 13, 1898 | | July 21, 1906 | May 9, 1910 | February 25, 1914 |
| 121 | 123 | 125 | 127 | 129 |
| December 14, 1917 | October 1, 1921 | July 20, 1925 | May 9, 1929 | February 24, 1933 |
| 131 | 133 | 135 | 137 | 139 |
| December 13, 1936 | October 1, 1940 | July 20, 1944 | May 9, 1948 | February 25, 1952 |
| 141 | 143 | 145 | 147 | 149 |
| December 14, 1955 | October 2, 1959 | July 20, 1963 | May 9, 1967 | February 25, 1971 |
| 151 | 153 | 155 | | |
| December 13, 1974 | October 2, 1978 | July 20, 1982 | | |

=== Tritos series ===
This eclipse is a part of a tritos cycle, repeating at alternating nodes every 135 synodic months (≈ 3986.63 days, or 11 years minus 1 month). Their appearance and longitude are irregular due to a lack of synchronization with the anomalistic month (period of perigee), but groupings of 3 tritos cycles (≈ 33 years minus 3 months) come close (≈ 434.044 anomalistic months), so eclipses are similar in these groupings.

Series members between 1801 and 2200
| June 16, 1806 (Saros 124) | May 16, 1817 (Saros 125) | April 14, 1828 (Saros 126) | March 15, 1839 (Saros 127) | February 12, 1850 (Saros 128) |
| January 11, 1861 (Saros 129) | December 12, 1871 (Saros 130) | November 10, 1882 (Saros 131) | October 9, 1893 (Saros 132) | September 9, 1904 (Saros 133) |
| August 10, 1915 (Saros 134) | July 9, 1926 (Saros 135) | June 8, 1937 (Saros 136) | May 9, 1948 (Saros 137) | April 8, 1959 (Saros 138) |
| March 7, 1970 (Saros 139) | February 4, 1981 (Saros 140) | January 4, 1992 (Saros 141) | December 4, 2002 (Saros 142) | November 3, 2013 (Saros 143) |
| October 2, 2024 (Saros 144) | September 2, 2035 (Saros 145) | August 2, 2046 (Saros 146) | July 1, 2057 (Saros 147) | May 31, 2068 (Saros 148) |
| May 1, 2079 (Saros 149) | March 31, 2090 (Saros 150) | February 28, 2101 (Saros 151) | January 29, 2112 (Saros 152) | December 28, 2122 (Saros 153) |
| November 26, 2133 (Saros 154) | October 26, 2144 (Saros 155) | September 26, 2155 (Saros 156) | August 25, 2166 (Saros 157) | July 25, 2177 (Saros 158) |
| June 24, 2188 (Saros 159) | May 24, 2199 (Saros 160) | | | |

=== Inex series ===
This eclipse is a part of the long period inex cycle, repeating at alternating nodes, every 358 synodic months (≈ 10,571.95 days, or 29 years minus 20 days). Their appearance and longitude are irregular due to a lack of synchronization with the anomalistic month (period of perigee). However, groupings of 3 inex cycles (≈ 87 years minus 2 months) comes close (≈ 1,151.02 anomalistic months), so eclipses are similar in these groupings.

Series members between 1801 and 2200
| August 17, 1803 (Saros 132) | July 27, 1832 (Saros 133) | July 8, 1861 (Saros 134) |
| June 17, 1890 (Saros 135) | May 29, 1919 (Saros 136) | May 9, 1948 (Saros 137) |
| April 18, 1977 (Saros 138) | March 29, 2006 (Saros 139) | March 9, 2035 (Saros 140) |
| February 17, 2064 (Saros 141) | January 27, 2093 (Saros 142) | January 8, 2122 (Saros 143) |
| December 19, 2150 (Saros 144) | November 28, 2179 (Saros 145) | |
