= Solar eclipse of December 6, 2086 =

Future partial solar eclipse

- Partial eclipse
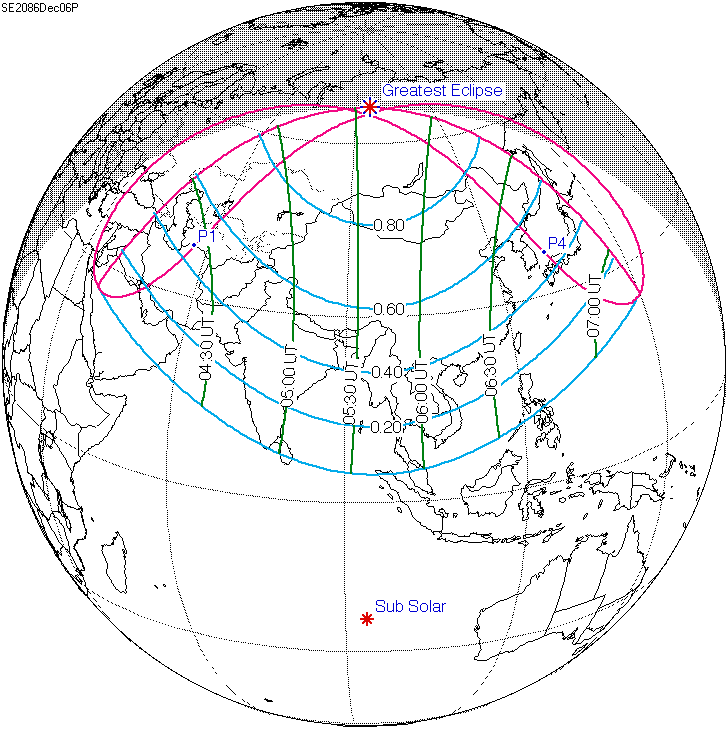
- Map
- Gamma: 1.0194
- Magnitude: 0.9271

Maximum eclipse
- Coordinates: 67.4°N 96.2°E

Times (UTC)
- Greatest eclipse: 5:38:55

References
- Saros: 153 (13 of 70)
- Catalog # (SE5000): 9702

A partial solar eclipse will occur at the Moon's ascending node of orbit on Friday, December 6, 2086, with a magnitude of 0.9271. A solar eclipse occurs when the Moon passes between Earth and the Sun, thereby totally or partly obscuring the image of the Sun for a viewer on Earth. A partial solar eclipse occurs in the polar regions of the Earth when the center of the Moon's shadow misses the Earth.

The partial solar eclipse will be visible for much of Asia.

== Eclipse details ==
Shown below are two tables displaying details about this particular solar eclipse. The first table outlines times at which the Moon's penumbra or umbra attains the specific parameter, and the second table describes various other parameters pertaining to this eclipse.

December 6, 2086 Solar Eclipse Times
Event	Time (UTC)
First Penumbral External Contact	2086 December 06 at 03:21:35.8 UTC
Equatorial Conjunction	2086 December 06 at 05:36:56.3 UTC
Greatest Eclipse	2086 December 06 at 05:38:55.4 UTC
Ecliptic Conjunction	2086 December 06 at 05:50:30.7 UTC
Last Penumbral External Contact	2086 December 06 at 07:56:10.8 UTC

December 6, 2086 Solar Eclipse Parameters
Parameter	Value
Eclipse Magnitude	0.92711
Eclipse Obscuration	0.86398
Gamma	1.01940
Sun Right Ascension	16h52m56.6s
Sun Declination	-22°31'57.0"
Sun Semi-Diameter	16'13.7"
Sun Equatorial Horizontal Parallax	08.9"
Moon Right Ascension	16h53m00.7s
Moon Declination	-21°35'36.6"
Moon Semi-Diameter	15'06.1"
Moon Equatorial Horizontal Parallax	0°55'25.4"
ΔT	111.4 s

== Eclipse season ==
This eclipse is part of an eclipse season, a period, roughly every six months, when eclipses occur. Only two (or occasionally three) eclipse seasons occur each year, and each season lasts about 35 days and repeats just short of six months (173 days) later; thus two full eclipse seasons always occur each year. Either two or three eclipses happen each eclipse season. In the sequence below, each eclipse is separated by a fortnight.

Eclipse season of November–December 2086
November 20 Descending node (full moon)	December 6 Ascending node (new moon)
Partial lunar eclipse Lunar Saros 127	Partial solar eclipse Solar Saros 153

== Related eclipses ==
=== Eclipses in 2086 ===
- A partial lunar eclipse on May 28.
- A total solar eclipse on June 11.
- A partial lunar eclipse on November 20.
- A partial solar eclipse on December 6.

=== Metonic ===
- Preceded by: Solar eclipse of February 16, 2083
- Followed by: Solar eclipse of September 23, 2090

=== Tzolkinex ===
- Preceded by: Solar eclipse of October 24, 2079
- Followed by: Solar eclipse of January 16, 2094

=== Half-Saros ===
- Preceded by: Lunar eclipse of November 29, 2077
- Followed by: Lunar eclipse of December 11, 2095

=== Tritos ===
- Preceded by: Solar eclipse of January 6, 2076
- Followed by: Solar eclipse of November 4, 2097

=== Solar Saros 153 ===
- Preceded by: Solar eclipse of November 24, 2068
- Followed by: Solar eclipse of December 17, 2104

=== Inex ===
- Preceded by: Solar eclipse of December 26, 2057
- Followed by: Solar eclipse of November 16, 2115

=== Triad ===
- Preceded by: Solar eclipse of February 5, 2000
- Followed by: Solar eclipse of October 7, 2173

=== Solar eclipses of 2083–2087 ===
This eclipse is a member of a semester series. An eclipse in a semester series of solar eclipses repeats approximately every 177 days and 4 hours (a semester) at alternating nodes of the Moon's orbit.

The partial solar eclipses on February 16, 2083 and August 13, 2083 occur in the previous lunar year eclipse set, and the partial solar eclipses on May 2, 2087 and October 26, 2087 occur in the next lunar year eclipse set.

Solar eclipse series sets from 2083 to 2087
Descending node			Ascending node		
Saros	Map	Gamma	Saros	Map	Gamma
118	July 15, 2083 Partial	1.5465	123	January 7, 2084 Partial	−1.0715
128	July 3, 2084 Annular	0.8208	133	December 27, 2084 Total	−0.4094
138	June 22, 2085 Annular	0.0452	143	December 16, 2085 Annular	0.2786
148	June 11, 2086 Total	−0.7215	153	December 6, 2086 Partial	1.0194
158	June 1, 2087 Partial	−1.4186			

=== Saros 153 ===
This eclipse is a part of Saros series 153, repeating every 18 years, 11 days, and containing 70 events. The series started with a partial solar eclipse on July 28, 1870. It contains annular eclipses from December 17, 2104 through May 26, 2970. There are no hybrid or total eclipses in this set. The series ends at member 70 as a partial eclipse on August 22, 3114. Its eclipses are tabulated in three columns; every third eclipse in the same column is one exeligmos apart, so they all cast shadows over approximately the same parts of the Earth.

The longest duration of annularity will be produced by member 38 at 7 minutes, 1 seconds on September 5, 2537. All eclipses in this series occur at the Moon’s ascending node of orbit.

Series members 1–19 occur between 1870 and 2200:
1	2	3
July 28, 1870	August 7, 1888	August 20, 1906
4	5	6
August 30, 1924	September 10, 1942	September 20, 1960
7	8	9
October 2, 1978	October 12, 1996	October 23, 2014
10	11	12
November 3, 2032	November 14, 2050	November 24, 2068
13	14	15
December 6, 2086	December 17, 2104	December 28, 2122
16	17	18
January 8, 2141	January 19, 2159	January 29, 2177
19
February 10, 2195

=== Metonic series ===
The metonic series repeats eclipses every 19 years (6939.69 days), lasting about 5 cycles. Eclipses occur in nearly the same calendar date. In addition, the octon subseries repeats 1/5 of that or every 3.8 years (1387.94 days). All eclipses in this table occur at the Moon's ascending node.

21 eclipse events between July 13, 2018 and July 12, 2094
July 12–13	April 30–May 1	February 16–17	December 5–6	September 22–23
117	119	121	123	125
July 13, 2018	April 30, 2022	February 17, 2026	December 5, 2029	September 23, 2033
127	129	131	133	135
July 13, 2037	April 30, 2041	February 16, 2045	December 5, 2048	September 22, 2052
137	139	141	143	145
July 12, 2056	April 30, 2060	February 17, 2064	December 6, 2067	September 23, 2071
147	149	151	153	155
July 13, 2075	May 1, 2079	February 16, 2083	December 6, 2086	September 23, 2090
157
July 12, 2094

=== Tritos series ===
This eclipse is a part of a tritos cycle, repeating at alternating nodes every 135 synodic months (≈ 3986.63 days, or 11 years minus 1 month). Their appearance and longitude are irregular due to a lack of synchronization with the anomalistic month (period of perigee), but groupings of 3 tritos cycles (≈ 33 years minus 3 months) come close (≈ 434.044 anomalistic months), so eclipses are similar in these groupings.

Series members between 1801 and 2200
February 21, 1803 (Saros 127)	January 21, 1814 (Saros 128)	December 20, 1824 (Saros 129)	November 20, 1835 (Saros 130)	October 20, 1846 (Saros 131)
September 18, 1857 (Saros 132)	August 18, 1868 (Saros 133)	July 19, 1879 (Saros 134)	June 17, 1890 (Saros 135)	May 18, 1901 (Saros 136)
April 17, 1912 (Saros 137)	March 17, 1923 (Saros 138)	February 14, 1934 (Saros 139)	January 14, 1945 (Saros 140)	December 14, 1955 (Saros 141)
November 12, 1966 (Saros 142)	October 12, 1977 (Saros 143)	September 11, 1988 (Saros 144)	August 11, 1999 (Saros 145)	July 11, 2010 (Saros 146)
June 10, 2021 (Saros 147)	May 9, 2032 (Saros 148)	April 9, 2043 (Saros 149)	March 9, 2054 (Saros 150)	February 5, 2065 (Saros 151)
January 6, 2076 (Saros 152)	December 6, 2086 (Saros 153)	November 4, 2097 (Saros 154)	October 5, 2108 (Saros 155)	September 5, 2119 (Saros 156)
August 4, 2130 (Saros 157)	July 3, 2141 (Saros 158)	June 3, 2152 (Saros 159)		April 1, 2174 (Saros 161)

=== Inex series ===
This eclipse is a part of the long period inex cycle, repeating at alternating nodes, every 358 synodic months (≈ 10,571.95 days, or 29 years minus 20 days). Their appearance and longitude are irregular due to a lack of synchronization with the anomalistic month (period of perigee). However, groupings of 3 inex cycles (≈ 87 years minus 2 months) comes close (≈ 1,151.02 anomalistic months), so eclipses are similar in these groupings.

Series members between 1801 and 2200
June 5, 1826 (Saros 144)	May 16, 1855 (Saros 145)	April 25, 1884 (Saros 146)
April 6, 1913 (Saros 147)	March 16, 1942 (Saros 148)	February 25, 1971 (Saros 149)
February 5, 2000 (Saros 150)	January 14, 2029 (Saros 151)	December 26, 2057 (Saros 152)
December 6, 2086 (Saros 153)	November 16, 2115 (Saros 154)	October 26, 2144 (Saros 155)
October 7, 2173 (Saros 156)		
