= Solar eclipse of April 17, 1912 =

Total eclipse

- Hybrid eclipse
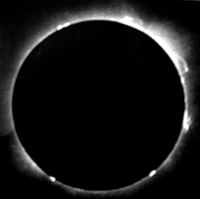
- The Observatory of Paris had the Globule balloon aloft for the 17 April 1912 hybrid eclipse, reported by Camille Flammarion.

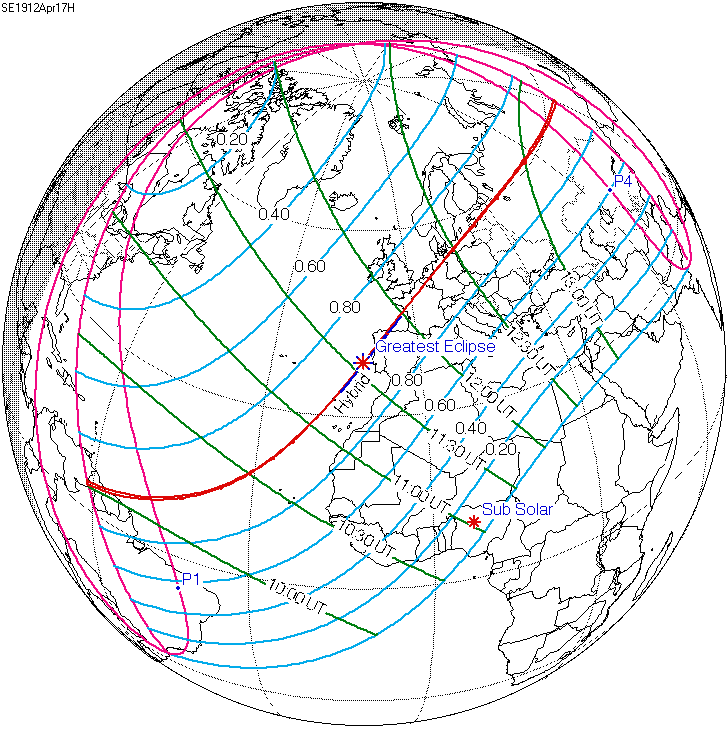
- Map
- Gamma: 0.528
- Magnitude: 1.0003

Maximum eclipse
- Duration: 2 s (0 min 2 s)
- Coordinates: 38.4°N 11.3°W
- Max. width of band: 1 km (0.62 mi)

Times (UTC)
- Greatest eclipse: 11:34:22

References
- Saros: 137 (30 of 70)
- Catalog # (SE5000): 9308

A total solar eclipse occurred at the Moon's ascending node of orbit on Wednesday, April 17, 1912, with a magnitude of 1.0003. It was a hybrid event, starting and ending as an annular eclipse, with only a small portion of totality (only 1.3 km (0.808 mi or 4,265 feet) wide). A solar eclipse occurs when the Moon passes between Earth and the Sun, thereby totally or partly obscuring the image of the Sun for a viewer on Earth. A hybrid solar eclipse is a rare type of solar eclipse that changes its appearance from annular to total and back as the Moon's shadow moves across the Earth's surface. Totality occurs between the annularity paths across the surface of the Earth, with the partial solar eclipse visible over a surrounding region thousands of kilometres wide. Occurring 7.4 days after apogee (on April 10, 1912, at 0:50 UTC) and 5.5 days before perigee (on April 22, 1912, at 22:20 UTC), the Moon's apparent diameter was larger.

Annularity was first visible from southeastern tip of Venezuela, northern tip of Brazil, British Guyana (today's Guyana), Dutch Guiana (today's Suriname) and Porto Santo Island in Madeira, Portugal, then totality from Portugal and Spain, with annularity continuing northeast across France (including northwestern suburbs of Paris), Belgium, Netherlands, Germany and Russian Empire (the parts now belonging to northern Latvia, southern Estonia and Russia). A partial eclipse was visible for parts of eastern South America, eastern North America, West Africa, Europe, and West Asia.

It was the 30th eclipse of the 137th Saros cycle, which began with a partial eclipse on May 25, 1389, and will conclude with a partial eclipse on June 28, 2633. This eclipse occurred two days after the RMS Titanic sank in the northwestern Atlantic Ocean.

== Observations ==
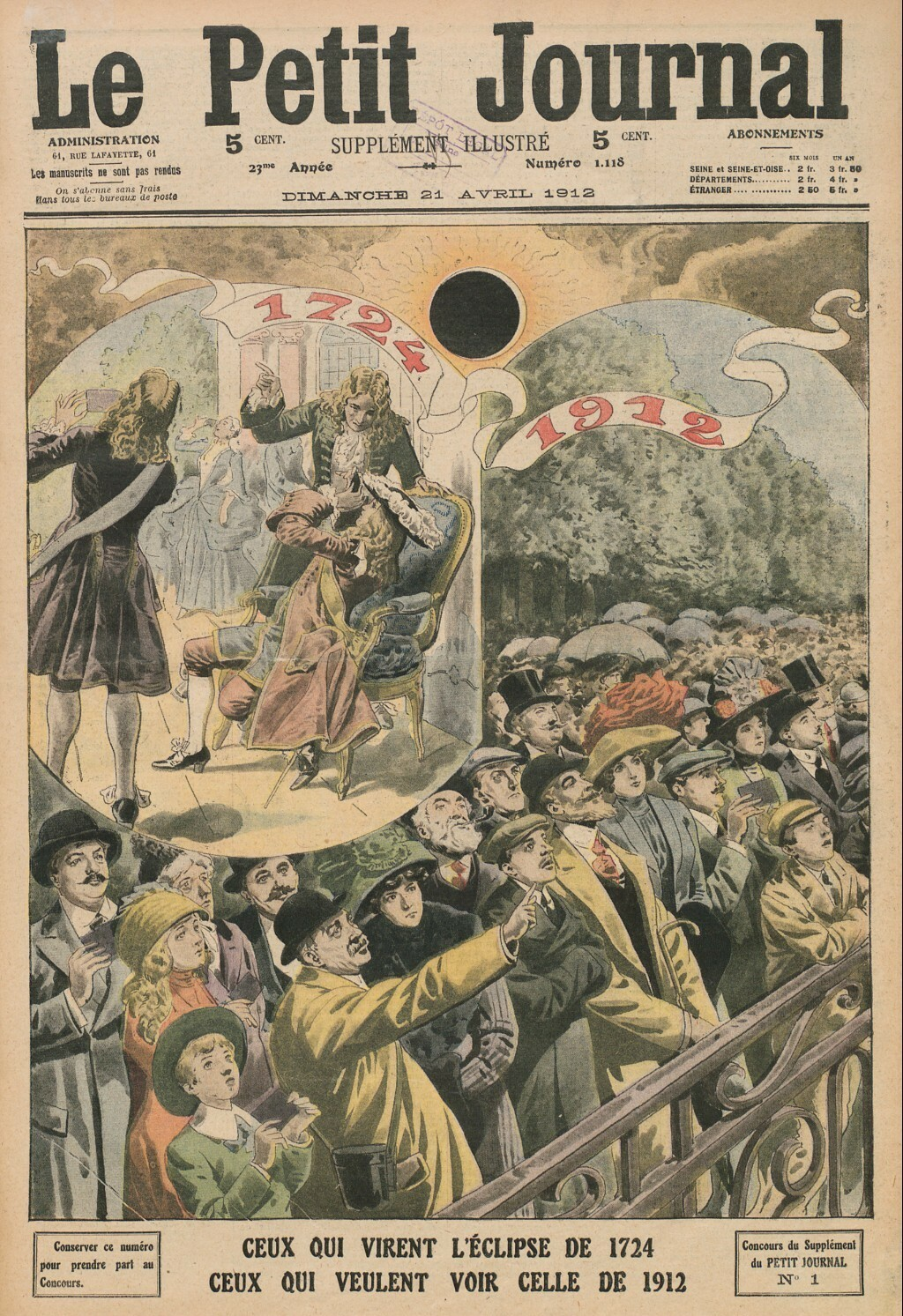
The Le Petit Journal cover, on 1912 April 21, shows eclipse watchers in 1912 along with the solar eclipse of May 22, 1724, the previous total solar eclipse visible from Paris, France
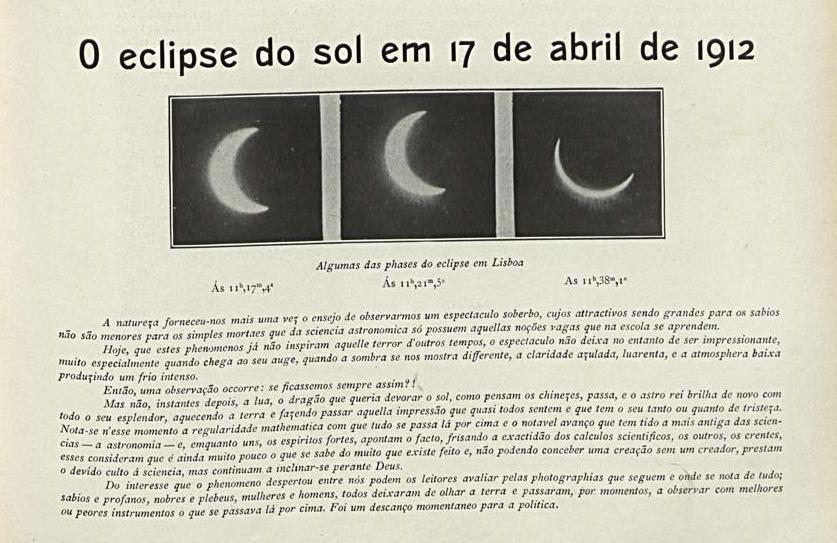
The 1 May 1912 edition of the luso-Brazilian Brasil-Portugal magazine publishes photographs of the eclipse, as it was seen in Lisbon. An editorial says: "One can tell, on that moment, the mathematical regularity that presides over everything that goes on above and the considerable achievements that the oldest of sciences — Astronomy — has been meeting. While some, strong spirits, point out the fact and point out how precise are scientific calculi, the others, believers, consider that what we can grasp is still too little and, not being able to conceive a Creation without a Creator, pay homage to science but continue to kneel before God. The reader can judge the interest that the phenomenon sparked among us by himself though the photographs that follow, where one can see it all; the wise and the godless, the noble and the commoners, women and men, everyone paid no attention to earthly matters and, for a moment, observed with better or worse instruments what was going on up above. It was even a momentaneous rest for politics."
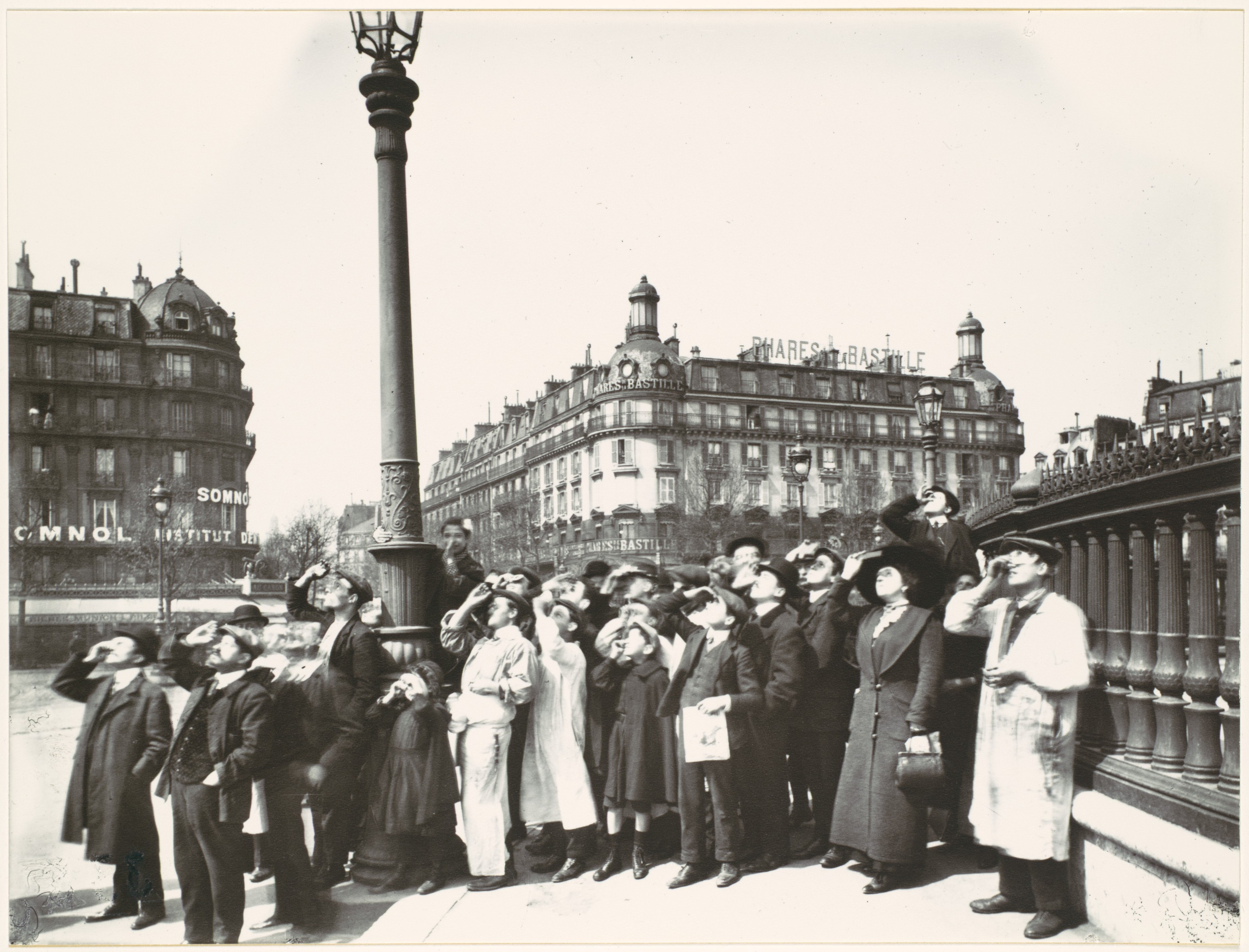

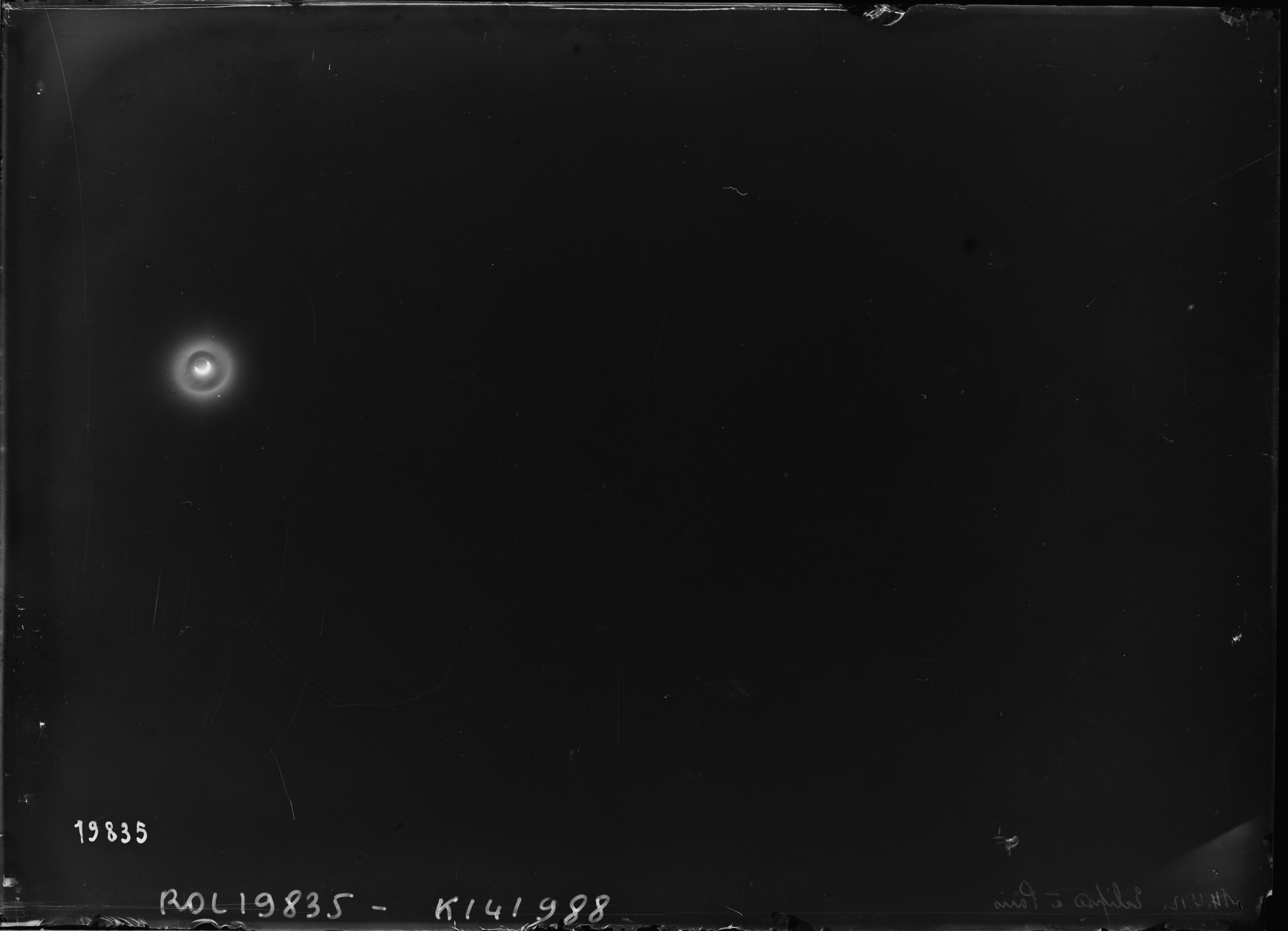

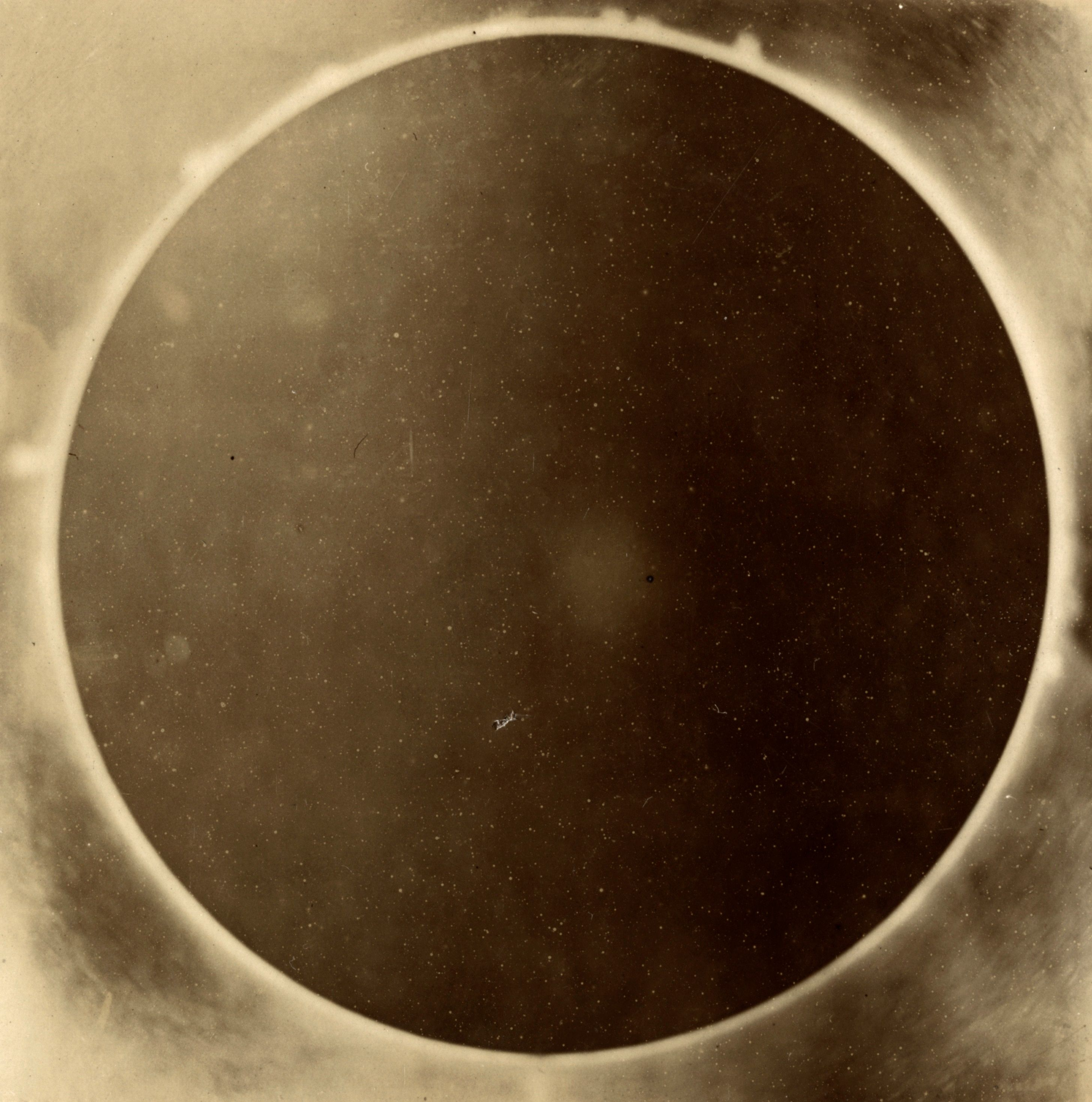

During a hybrid solar eclipse, the apex of the moon's umbral cone is very close to the Earth's surface, and the magnitude is very large. The edges of the moon and the sun are very close to each other as seen from the Earth in both the total and annular portion of the path. A series of Baily's beads on the lunar limb provide an excellent opportunity to measure the size and shape of the Earth, as well as the mountains and valleys on the lunar limb. Measurements were made in Europe during this eclipse to locate precisely the limits of the umbral shadow by spreading people every 100 metres along a straight road.

The hybrid solar eclipse of April 28, 1930, also belonging to Solar Saros 137, also occurred with a magnitude close to 1. Similar observations were made near Camptonville, California. Such observations were also made during two later annular solar eclipses of May 9, 1948 in Rebun Island, Japan and May 20, 1966 in Greece and Turkey, also belonging to the same solar Saros cycle. Similar measurements were also done in New York City during the total solar eclipse of January 24, 1925, which did not belong to the same Saros cycle 137 had a magnitude much larger than 1.

== Eclipse details ==
Shown below are two tables displaying details about this particular solar eclipse. The first table outlines times at which the Moon's penumbra or umbra attains the specific parameter, and the second table describes various other parameters pertaining to this eclipse.

April 17, 1912 Solar Eclipse Times
Event	Time (UTC)
First Penumbral External Contact	1912 April 17 at 08:53:53.3 UTC
First Umbral External Contact	1912 April 17 at 10:00:21.2 UTC
First Central Line	1912 April 17 at 10:00:52.4 UTC
Greatest Duration	1912 April 17 at 10:00:52.4 UTC
First Umbral Internal Contact	1912 April 17 at 10:01:23.5 UTC
Greatest Eclipse	1912 April 17 at 11:34:21.9 UTC
Ecliptic Conjunction	1912 April 17 at 11:40:06.1 UTC
Equatorial Conjunction	1912 April 17 at 12:03:39.6 UTC
Last Umbral Internal Contact	1912 April 17 at 13:07:04.3 UTC
Last Central Line	1912 April 17 at 13:07:32.6 UTC
Last Umbral External Contact	1912 April 17 at 13:08:00.8 UTC
Last Penumbral External Contact	1912 April 17 at 14:14:32.4 UTC

April 17, 1912 Solar Eclipse Parameters
Parameter	Value
Eclipse Magnitude	1.00032
Eclipse Obscuration	1.00064
Gamma	0.52797
Sun Right Ascension	01h40m32.0s
Sun Declination	+10°26'25.1"
Sun Semi-Diameter	15'55.5"
Sun Equatorial Horizontal Parallax	08.8"
Moon Right Ascension	01h39m36.3s
Moon Declination	+10°53'32.1"
Moon Semi-Diameter	15'42.9"
Moon Equatorial Horizontal Parallax	0°57'40.6"
ΔT	13.7 s

== Eclipse season ==
This eclipse is part of an eclipse season, a period, roughly every six months, when eclipses occur. Only two (or occasionally three) eclipse seasons occur each year, and each season lasts about 35 days and repeats just short of six months (173 days) later; thus two full eclipse seasons always occur each year. Either two or three eclipses happen each eclipse season. In the sequence below, each eclipse is separated by a fortnight.

Eclipse season of April 1912
April 1 Descending node (full moon)	April 17 Ascending node (new moon)
Partial lunar eclipse Lunar Saros 111	Hybrid solar eclipse Solar Saros 137

== Related eclipses ==
=== Eclipses in 1912 ===
- A partial lunar eclipse on April 1.
- A hybrid solar eclipse on April 17.
- A partial lunar eclipse on September 26.
- A total solar eclipse on October 10.

=== Metonic ===
- Preceded by: Solar eclipse of June 28, 1908
- Followed by: Solar eclipse of February 3, 1916

=== Tzolkinex ===
- Preceded by: Solar eclipse of March 6, 1905
- Followed by: Solar eclipse of May 29, 1919

=== Half-Saros ===
- Preceded by: Lunar eclipse of April 12, 1903
- Followed by: Lunar eclipse of April 22, 1921

=== Tritos ===
- Preceded by: Solar eclipse of May 18, 1901
- Followed by: Solar eclipse of March 17, 1923

=== Solar Saros 137 ===
- Preceded by: Solar eclipse of April 6, 1894
- Followed by: Solar eclipse of April 28, 1930

=== Inex ===
- Preceded by: Solar eclipse of May 6, 1883
- Followed by: Solar eclipse of March 27, 1941

=== Triad ===
- Preceded by: Solar eclipse of June 16, 1825
- Followed by: Solar eclipse of February 16, 1999

=== Solar eclipses of 1910–1913 ===
This eclipse is a member of a semester series. An eclipse in a semester series of solar eclipses repeats approximately every 177 days and 4 hours (a semester) at alternating nodes of the Moon's orbit.

The partial solar eclipse on August 31, 1913 occurs in the next lunar year eclipse set.

Solar eclipse series sets from 1910 to 1913
Ascending node			Descending node		
Saros	Map	Gamma	Saros	Map	Gamma
117	May 9, 1910 Total	−0.9437	122	November 2, 1910 Partial	1.0603
127	April 28, 1911 Total	−0.2294	132	October 22, 1911 Annular	0.3224
137	April 17, 1912 Hybrid	0.528	142	October 10, 1912 Total	−0.4149
147	April 6, 1913 Partial	1.3147	152	September 30, 1913 Partial	−1.1005

=== Saros 137 ===
This eclipse is a part of Saros series 137, repeating every 18 years, 11 days, and containing 70 events. The series started with a partial solar eclipse on May 25, 1389. It contains total eclipses from August 20, 1533 through December 6, 1695; the first set of hybrid eclipses from December 17, 1713 through February 11, 1804; the first set of annular eclipses from February 21, 1822 through March 25, 1876; the second set of hybrid eclipses from April 6, 1894 through April 28, 1930; and the second set of annular eclipses from May 9, 1948 through April 13, 2507. The series ends at member 70 as a partial eclipse on June 28, 2633. Its eclipses are tabulated in three columns; every third eclipse in the same column is one exeligmos apart, so they all cast shadows over approximately the same parts of the Earth.

The longest duration of totality was produced by member 11 at 2 minutes, 55 seconds on September 10, 1569, and the longest duration of annularity will be produced by member 59 at 7 minutes, 5 seconds on February 28, 2435. All eclipses in this series occur at the Moon’s ascending node of orbit.

Series members 24–46 occur between 1801 and 2200:
24	25	26
February 11, 1804	February 21, 1822	March 4, 1840
27	28	29
March 15, 1858	March 25, 1876	April 6, 1894
30	31	32
April 17, 1912	April 28, 1930	May 9, 1948
33	34	35
May 20, 1966	May 30, 1984	June 10, 2002
36	37	38
June 21, 2020	July 2, 2038	July 12, 2056
39	40	41
July 24, 2074	August 3, 2092	August 15, 2110
42	43	44
August 25, 2128	September 6, 2146	September 16, 2164
45	46	
September 27, 2182	October 9, 2200	

=== Metonic series ===
The metonic series repeats eclipses every 19 years (6939.69 days), lasting about 5 cycles. Eclipses occur in nearly the same calendar date. In addition, the octon subseries repeats 1/5 of that or every 3.8 years (1387.94 days). All eclipses in this table occur at the Moon's ascending node.

23 eclipse events between February 3, 1859 and June 29, 1946
February 1–3	November 21–22	September 8–10	June 28–29	April 16–18
109	111	113	115	117
February 3, 1859	November 21, 1862		June 28, 1870	April 16, 1874
119	121	123	125	127
February 2, 1878	November 21, 1881	September 8, 1885	June 28, 1889	April 16, 1893
129	131	133	135	137
February 1, 1897	November 22, 1900	September 9, 1904	June 28, 1908	April 17, 1912
139	141	143	145	147
February 3, 1916	November 22, 1919	September 10, 1923	June 29, 1927	April 18, 1931
149	151	153	155	
February 3, 1935	November 21, 1938	September 10, 1942	June 29, 1946	

=== Tritos series ===
This eclipse is a part of a tritos cycle, repeating at alternating nodes every 135 synodic months (≈ 3986.63 days, or 11 years minus 1 month). Their appearance and longitude are irregular due to a lack of synchronization with the anomalistic month (period of perigee), but groupings of 3 tritos cycles (≈ 33 years minus 3 months) come close (≈ 434.044 anomalistic months), so eclipses are similar in these groupings.

Series members between 1801 and 2200
February 21, 1803 (Saros 127)	January 21, 1814 (Saros 128)	December 20, 1824 (Saros 129)	November 20, 1835 (Saros 130)	October 20, 1846 (Saros 131)
September 18, 1857 (Saros 132)	August 18, 1868 (Saros 133)	July 19, 1879 (Saros 134)	June 17, 1890 (Saros 135)	May 18, 1901 (Saros 136)
April 17, 1912 (Saros 137)	March 17, 1923 (Saros 138)	February 14, 1934 (Saros 139)	January 14, 1945 (Saros 140)	December 14, 1955 (Saros 141)
November 12, 1966 (Saros 142)	October 12, 1977 (Saros 143)	September 11, 1988 (Saros 144)	August 11, 1999 (Saros 145)	July 11, 2010 (Saros 146)
June 10, 2021 (Saros 147)	May 9, 2032 (Saros 148)	April 9, 2043 (Saros 149)	March 9, 2054 (Saros 150)	February 5, 2065 (Saros 151)
January 6, 2076 (Saros 152)	December 6, 2086 (Saros 153)	November 4, 2097 (Saros 154)	October 5, 2108 (Saros 155)	September 5, 2119 (Saros 156)
August 4, 2130 (Saros 157)	July 3, 2141 (Saros 158)	June 3, 2152 (Saros 159)		April 1, 2174 (Saros 161)

=== Inex series ===
This eclipse is a part of the long period inex cycle, repeating at alternating nodes, every 358 synodic months (≈ 10,571.95 days, or 29 years minus 20 days). Their appearance and longitude are irregular due to a lack of synchronization with the anomalistic month (period of perigee). However, groupings of 3 inex cycles (≈ 87 years minus 2 months) comes close (≈ 1,151.02 anomalistic months), so eclipses are similar in these groupings.

Series members between 1801 and 2200
June 16, 1825 (Saros 134)	May 26, 1854 (Saros 135)	May 6, 1883 (Saros 136)
April 17, 1912 (Saros 137)	March 27, 1941 (Saros 138)	March 7, 1970 (Saros 139)
February 16, 1999 (Saros 140)	January 26, 2028 (Saros 141)	January 5, 2057 (Saros 142)
December 16, 2085 (Saros 143)	November 27, 2114 (Saros 144)	November 7, 2143 (Saros 145)
October 17, 2172 (Saros 146)		
