= Solar eclipse of February 5, 2000 =

20th-century partial solar eclipse

- Partial eclipse
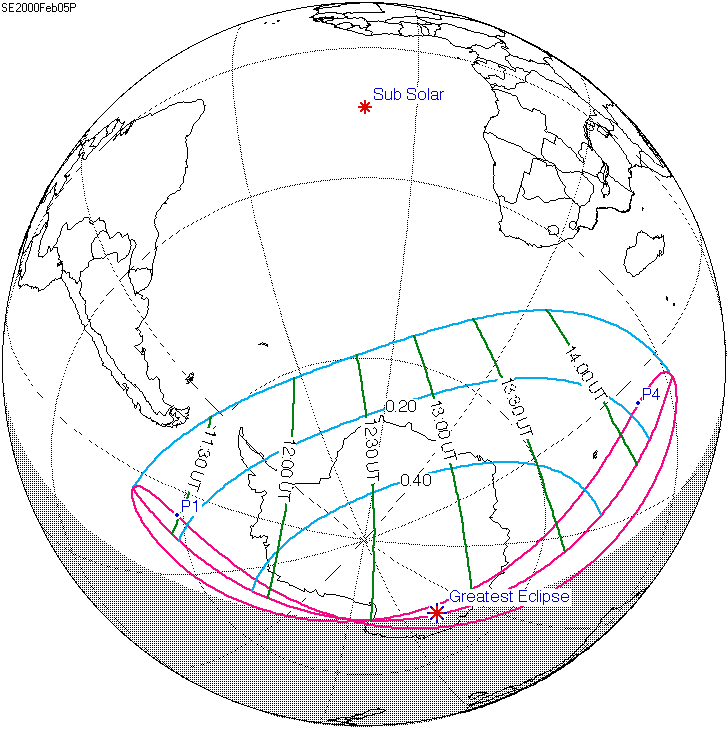
- Map
- Gamma: −1.2233
- Magnitude: 0.5795

Maximum eclipse
- Coordinates: 70.2°S 134.1°E

Times (UTC)
- Greatest eclipse: 12:50:27

References
- Saros: 150 (16 of 71)
- Catalog # (SE5000): 9507

A partial solar eclipse occurred at the Moon's descending node of orbit on Saturday, February 5, 2000, with a magnitude of 0.5795. A solar eclipse occurs when the Moon passes between Earth and the Sun, thereby totally or partly obscuring the image of the Sun for a viewer on Earth. A partial solar eclipse occurs in the polar regions of the Earth when the center of the Moon's shadow misses the Earth.

This was the first of four partial solar eclipses in 2000, with the others occurring on July 1, July 31, and December 25.

A partial eclipse was visible for parts of Antarctica.

== Images ==
Animated path

== Eclipse timing ==
=== Places experiencing partial eclipse ===
Solar eclipse of February 5, 2000 (local times)
Country or territory	City or place	Start of partial eclipse	Maximum eclipse	End of partial eclipse	Duration of eclipse (hr:min)	Maximum coverage
Antarctica	Carlini Base	08:13:02	08:38:34	09:04:46	0:52	1.76%
Antarctica	Palmer Station	08:06:07	08:40:44	09:16:30	1:10	5.05%
Antarctica	Esperanza Base	08:12:25	08:41:32	09:11:29	0:59	2.61%
Antarctica	Marambio Base	08:11:34	08:43:13	09:15:50	1:04	3.41%
Antarctica	Rothera Research Station	08:03:59	08:44:35	09:26:36	1:23	9.05%
Antarctica	San Martín Base	08:04:33	08:45:58	09:28:47	1:24	9.55%
Antarctica	Belgrano II Base	08:21:14	09:14:55	10:09:18	1:48	20.40%
Antarctica	Neumayer Station III	11:38:15	12:29:04	13:19:51	1:42	12.19%
Antarctica	McMurdo Station (Note: The times listed for this location occur on February 6, 2000, local time.)	00:35:25	01:29:26	02:23:19	1:48	43.75%
Antarctica	Zucchelli Station	00:38:18	01:31:23	02:24:16	1:46	44.70%
Antarctica	Troll	11:42:41	12:37:03	13:30:51	1:48	16.13%
Antarctica	Vostok Station	17:50:26	18:47:43	19:43:51	1:53	43.55%
Antarctica	Concordia Station	19:52:44	20:48:24	21:43:01	1:50	45.96%
Antarctica	Casey Station	20:11:42	21:06:01	21:46:45 (sunset)	1:35	45.01%
Antarctica	Davis Station	19:13:34	20:11:21	21:06:45	1:53	38.40%
Antarctica	Mawson Station	18:15:14	19:13:38	20:09:24	1:54	32.91%
French Southern and Antarctic Lands	Port-aux-Français	18:00:24	18:49:28	19:35:41	1:35	21.87%
South Africa	Marion Island	16:17:40	16:51:56	17:24:31	1:07	3.73%
French Southern and Antarctic Lands	Île de la Possession	18:13:57	18:56:42	19:36:55	1:23	9.96%
French Southern and Antarctic Lands	Île Amsterdam	18:27:06	18:56:43	18:59:39 (sunset)	0:33	10.74%

== Eclipse details ==
Shown below are two tables displaying details about this particular solar eclipse. The first table outlines times at which the Moon's penumbra or umbra attains the specific parameter, and the second table describes various other parameters pertaining to this eclipse.

February 5, 2000 solar eclipse times
Event	Time (UTC)
First penumbral external contact	2000 February 05 at 10:56:47.8 UTC
Equatorial conjunction	2000 February 05 at 12:20:54.0 UTC
Greatest eclipse	2000 February 05 at 12:50:26.9 UTC
Ecliptic conjunction	2000 February 05 at 13:04:20.3 UTC
Last penumbral external contact	2000 February 05 at 14:44:14.8 UTC

February 5, 2000 solar eclipse parameters
Parameter	Value
Eclipse magnitude	0.57949
Eclipse obscuration	0.46882
Gamma	−1.22325
Sun right ascension	21h13m55.0s
Sun declination	-16°02'00.9"
Sun semi-diameter	16'13.3"
Sun equatorial horizontal parallax	08.9"
Moon right ascension	21h14m52.3s
Moon declination	-17°07'51.7"
Moon semi-diameter	15'01.4"
Moon equatorial horizontal parallax	0°55'08.1"
ΔT	63.8 s

== Eclipse season ==
This eclipse is part of an eclipse season, a period, roughly every six months, when eclipses occur. Only two (or occasionally three) eclipse seasons occur each year, and each season lasts about 35 days and repeats just short of six months (173 days) later; thus two full eclipse seasons always occur each year. Either two or three eclipses happen each eclipse season. In the sequence below, each eclipse is separated by a fortnight.

Eclipse season of January–February 2000
January 21 Ascending node (full moon)	February 5 Descending node (new moon)
Total lunar eclipse Lunar Saros 124	Partial solar eclipse Solar Saros 150

== Related eclipses ==
=== Eclipses in 2000 ===
- A total lunar eclipse on January 21
- A partial solar eclipse on February 5
- A partial solar eclipse on July 1
- A total lunar eclipse on July 16
- A partial solar eclipse on July 31
- A partial solar eclipse on December 25

=== Metonic ===
- Preceded by: Solar eclipse of April 17, 1996
- Followed by: Solar eclipse of November 23, 2003

=== Tzolkinex ===
- Preceded by: Solar eclipse of December 24, 1992
- Followed by: Solar eclipse of March 19, 2007

=== Half-Saros ===
- Preceded by: Lunar eclipse of January 30, 1991
- Followed by: Lunar eclipse of February 9, 2009

=== Tritos ===
- Preceded by: Solar eclipse of March 7, 1989
- Followed by: Solar eclipse of January 4, 2011

=== Solar Saros 150 ===
- Preceded by: Solar eclipse of January 25, 1982
- Followed by: Solar eclipse of February 15, 2018

=== Inex ===
- Preceded by: Solar eclipse of February 25, 1971
- Followed by: Solar eclipse of January 14, 2029

=== Triad ===
- Preceded by: Solar eclipse of April 6, 1913
- Followed by: Solar eclipse of December 6, 2086

=== Solar eclipses of 1997–2000 ===
This eclipse is a member of a semester series. An eclipse in a semester series of solar eclipses repeats approximately every 177 days and 4 hours (a semester) at alternating nodes of the Moon's orbit.

The partial solar eclipses on July 1, 2000 and December 25, 2000 occur in the next lunar year eclipse set.

Solar eclipse series sets from 1997 to 2000
Descending node			Ascending node		
Saros	Map	Gamma	Saros	Map	Gamma
120 Totality in Chita, Russia	March 9, 1997 Total	0.9183	125	September 2, 1997 Partial	−1.0352
130 Totality near Guadeloupe	February 26, 1998 Total	0.2391	135	August 22, 1998 Annular	−0.2644
140	February 16, 1999 Annular	−0.4726	145 Totality in France	August 11, 1999 Total	0.5062
150	February 5, 2000 Partial	−1.2233	155	July 31, 2000 Partial	1.2166

=== Saros 150 ===
This eclipse is a part of Saros series 150, repeating every 18 years, 11 days, and containing 71 events. The series started with a partial solar eclipse on August 24, 1729. It contains annular eclipses from April 22, 2126 through June 22, 2829. There are no hybrid or total eclipses in this set. The series ends at member 71 as a partial eclipse on September 29, 2991. Its eclipses are tabulated in three columns; every third eclipse in the same column is one exeligmos apart, so they all cast shadows over approximately the same parts of the Earth.

The longest duration of annularity will be produced by member 45 at 9 minutes, 58 seconds on December 19, 2522. All eclipses in this series occur at the Moon’s descending node of orbit.

Series members 5–27 occur between 1801 and 2200:
5	6	7
October 7, 1801	October 19, 1819	October 29, 1837
8	9	10
November 9, 1855	November 20, 1873	December 1, 1891
11	12	13
December 12, 1909	December 24, 1927	January 3, 1946
14	15	16
January 14, 1964	January 25, 1982	February 5, 2000
17	18	19
February 15, 2018	February 27, 2036	March 9, 2054
20	21	22
March 19, 2072	March 31, 2090	April 11, 2108
23	24	25
April 22, 2126	May 3, 2144	May 14, 2162
26	27	
May 24, 2180	June 4, 2198	

=== Metonic series ===
The metonic series repeats eclipses every 19 years (6939.69 days), lasting about 5 cycles. Eclipses occur in nearly the same calendar date. In addition, the octon subseries repeats 1/5 of that or every 3.8 years (1387.94 days). All eclipses in this table occur at the Moon's descending node.

22 eclipse events between September 12, 1931 and July 1, 2011
September 11–12	June 30–July 1	April 17–19	February 4–5	November 22–23
114	116	118	120	122
September 12, 1931	June 30, 1935	April 19, 1939	February 4, 1943	November 23, 1946
124	126	128	130	132
September 12, 1950	June 30, 1954	April 19, 1958	February 5, 1962	November 23, 1965
134	136	138	140	142
September 11, 1969	June 30, 1973	April 18, 1977	February 4, 1981	November 22, 1984
144	146	148	150	152
September 11, 1988	June 30, 1992	April 17, 1996	February 5, 2000	November 23, 2003
154	156			
September 11, 2007	July 1, 2011			

=== Tritos series ===
This eclipse is a part of a tritos cycle, repeating at alternating nodes every 135 synodic months (≈ 3986.63 days, or 11 years minus 1 month). Their appearance and longitude are irregular due to a lack of synchronization with the anomalistic month (period of perigee), but groupings of 3 tritos cycles (≈ 33 years minus 3 months) come close (≈ 434.044 anomalistic months), so eclipses are similar in these groupings.

Series members between 1801 and 2087
August 17, 1803 (Saros 132)	July 17, 1814 (Saros 133)	June 16, 1825 (Saros 134)	May 15, 1836 (Saros 135)	April 15, 1847 (Saros 136)
March 15, 1858 (Saros 137)	February 11, 1869 (Saros 138)	January 11, 1880 (Saros 139)	December 12, 1890 (Saros 140)	November 11, 1901 (Saros 141)
October 10, 1912 (Saros 142)	September 10, 1923 (Saros 143)	August 10, 1934 (Saros 144)	July 9, 1945 (Saros 145)	June 8, 1956 (Saros 146)
May 9, 1967 (Saros 147)	April 7, 1978 (Saros 148)	March 7, 1989 (Saros 149)	February 5, 2000 (Saros 150)	January 4, 2011 (Saros 151)
December 4, 2021 (Saros 152)	November 3, 2032 (Saros 153)	October 3, 2043 (Saros 154)	September 2, 2054 (Saros 155)	August 2, 2065 (Saros 156)
July 1, 2076 (Saros 157)	June 1, 2087 (Saros 158)			

=== Inex series ===
This eclipse is a part of the long period inex cycle, repeating at alternating nodes, every 358 synodic months (≈ 10,571.95 days, or 29 years minus 20 days). Their appearance and longitude are irregular due to a lack of synchronization with the anomalistic month (period of perigee). However, groupings of 3 inex cycles (≈ 87 years minus 2 months) comes close (≈ 1,151.02 anomalistic months), so eclipses are similar in these groupings.

Series members between 1801 and 2200
June 5, 1826 (Saros 144)	May 16, 1855 (Saros 145)	April 25, 1884 (Saros 146)
April 6, 1913 (Saros 147)	March 16, 1942 (Saros 148)	February 25, 1971 (Saros 149)
February 5, 2000 (Saros 150)	January 14, 2029 (Saros 151)	December 26, 2057 (Saros 152)
December 6, 2086 (Saros 153)	November 16, 2115 (Saros 154)	October 26, 2144 (Saros 155)
October 7, 2173 (Saros 156)		
