= Solar eclipse of January 6, 2076 =

Total eclipse

- Total eclipse
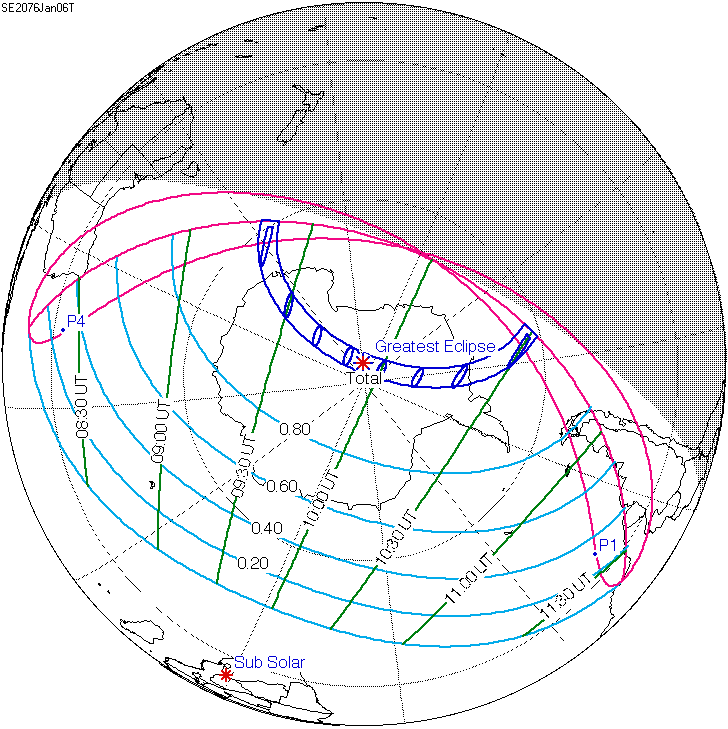
- Map
- Gamma: −0.9373
- Magnitude: 1.0342

Maximum eclipse
- Duration: 109 s (1 min 49 s)
- Coordinates: 87.2°S 173.7°W
- Max. width of band: 340 km (210 mi)

Times (UTC)
- Greatest eclipse: 10:07:27

References
- Saros: 152 (16 of 70)
- Catalog # (SE5000): 9677

A total solar eclipse will occur at the Moon's descending node of orbit on Monday, January 6, 2076, with a magnitude of 1.0342. A solar eclipse occurs when the Moon passes between Earth and the Sun, thereby totally or partly obscuring the image of the Sun for a viewer on Earth. A total solar eclipse occurs when the Moon's apparent diameter is larger than the Sun's, blocking all direct sunlight, turning day into darkness. Totality occurs in a narrow path across Earth's surface, with the partial solar eclipse visible over a surrounding region thousands of kilometres wide. Occurring about 8.5 hours before perigee (on January 6, 2076, at 18:40 UTC), the Moon's apparent diameter will be larger.

This will be the first of four solar eclipses in 2076, with the others occurring on June 1, July 1, and November 26.

The path of totality will be visible from parts of Antarctica. A partial solar eclipse will also be visible for parts of southern South America, Antarctica, and southwestern Australia.

== Eclipse details ==
Shown below are two tables displaying details about this particular solar eclipse. The first table outlines times at which the Moon's penumbra or umbra attains the specific parameter, and the second table describes various other parameters pertaining to this eclipse.

January 6, 2076 Solar Eclipse Times
Event	Time (UTC)
First Penumbral External Contact	2076 January 6 at 08:01:50.9 UTC
First Umbral External Contact	2076 January 6 at 09:30:07.4 UTC
First Central Line	2076 January 6 at 09:32:18.8 UTC
First Umbral Internal Contact	2076 January 6 at 09:34:37.8 UTC
Equatorial Conjunction	2076 January 6 at 10:05:23.8 UTC
Greatest Eclipse	2076 January 6 at 10:07:27.5 UTC
Greatest Duration	2076 January 6 at 10:07:36.9 UTC
Ecliptic Conjunction	2076 January 6 at 10:16:52.4 UTC
Last Umbral Internal Contact	2076 January 6 at 10:40:18.1 UTC
Last Central Line	2076 January 6 at 10:42:37.7 UTC
Last Umbral External Contact	2076 January 6 at 10:44:49.5 UTC
Last Penumbral External Contact	2076 January 6 at 12:13:04.2 UTC

January 6, 2076 Solar Eclipse Parameters
Parameter	Value
Eclipse Magnitude	1.03424
Eclipse Obscuration	1.06965
Gamma	−0.93732
Sun Right Ascension	19h09m11.6s
Sun Declination	-22°28'36.7"
Sun Semi-Diameter	16'15.9"
Sun Equatorial Horizontal Parallax	08.9"
Moon Right Ascension	19h09m16.9s
Moon Declination	-23°26'00.6"
Moon Semi-Diameter	16'43.8"
Moon Equatorial Horizontal Parallax	1°01'24.1"
ΔT	102.2 s

== Eclipse season ==
This eclipse is part of an eclipse season, a period, roughly every six months, when eclipses occur. Only two (or occasionally three) eclipse seasons occur each year, and each season lasts about 35 days and repeats just short of six months (173 days) later; thus two full eclipse seasons always occur each year. Either two or three eclipses happen each eclipse season. In the sequence below, each eclipse is separated by a fortnight.

Eclipse season of December 2075–January 2076
December 22 Ascending node (full moon)	January 6 Descending node (new moon)
Partial lunar eclipse Lunar Saros 126	Total solar eclipse Solar Saros 152

== Related eclipses ==
=== Eclipses in 2076 ===
- A total solar eclipse on January 6.
- A partial solar eclipse on June 1.
- A total lunar eclipse on June 17.
- A partial solar eclipse on July 1.
- A partial solar eclipse on November 26.
- A total lunar eclipse on December 10.

=== Metonic ===
- Preceded by: Solar eclipse of March 19, 2072
- Followed by: Solar eclipse of October 24, 2079

=== Tzolkinex ===
- Preceded by: Solar eclipse of November 24, 2068
- Followed by: Solar eclipse of February 16, 2083

=== Half-Saros ===
- Preceded by: Lunar eclipse of December 31, 2066
- Followed by: Lunar eclipse of January 10, 2085

=== Tritos ===
- Preceded by: Solar eclipse of February 5, 2065
- Followed by: Solar eclipse of December 6, 2086

=== Solar Saros 152 ===
- Preceded by: Solar eclipse of December 26, 2057
- Followed by: Solar eclipse of January 16, 2094

=== Inex ===
- Preceded by: Solar eclipse of January 26, 2047
- Followed by: Solar eclipse of December 17, 2104

=== Triad ===
- Preceded by: Solar eclipse of March 7, 1989
- Followed by: Solar eclipse of November 6, 2162

=== Solar eclipses of 2073–2076 ===
This eclipse is a member of a semester series. An eclipse in a semester series of solar eclipses repeats approximately every 177 days and 4 hours (a semester) at alternating nodes of the Moon's orbit.

The partial solar eclipses on June 1, 2076 and November 26, 2076 occur in the next lunar year eclipse set.

Solar eclipse series sets from 2073 to 2076
Descending node			Ascending node		
Saros	Map	Gamma	Saros	Map	Gamma
122	February 7, 2073 Partial	1.1651	127	August 3, 2073 Total	−0.8763
132	January 27, 2074 Annular	0.4251	137	July 24, 2074 Annular	−0.1242
142	January 16, 2075 Total	−0.2799	147	July 13, 2075 Annular	0.6583
152	January 6, 2076 Total	−0.9373	157	July 1, 2076 Partial	1.4005

=== Saros 152 ===
This eclipse is a part of Saros series 152, repeating every 18 years, 11 days, and containing 70 events. The series started with a partial solar eclipse on July 26, 1805. It contains total eclipses from November 2, 1967 through September 14, 2490; hybrid eclipses from September 26, 2508 through October 17, 2544; and annular eclipses from October 29, 2562 through June 16, 2941. The series ends at member 70 as a partial eclipse on August 20, 3049. Its eclipses are tabulated in three columns; every third eclipse in the same column is one exeligmos apart, so they all cast shadows over approximately the same parts of the Earth.

The longest duration of totality will be produced by member 30 at 5 minutes, 16 seconds on June 9, 2328, and the longest duration of annularity will be produced by member 53 at 5 minutes, 20 seconds on February 16, 2743. All eclipses in this series occur at the Moon’s descending node of orbit.

Series members 1–22 occur between 1805 and 2200:
1	2	3
July 26, 1805	August 6, 1823	August 16, 1841
4	5	6
August 28, 1859	September 7, 1877	September 18, 1895
7	8	9
September 30, 1913	October 11, 1931	October 21, 1949
10	11	12
November 2, 1967	November 12, 1985	November 23, 2003
13	14	15
December 4, 2021	December 15, 2039	December 26, 2057
16	17	18
January 6, 2076	January 16, 2094	January 29, 2112
19	20	21
February 8, 2130	February 19, 2148	March 2, 2166
22
March 12, 2184

=== Metonic series ===
The metonic series repeats eclipses every 19 years (6939.69 days), lasting about 5 cycles. Eclipses occur in nearly the same calendar date. In addition, the octon subseries repeats 1/5 of that or every 3.8 years (1387.94 days). All eclipses in this table occur at the Moon's descending node.

22 eclipse events between June 1, 2011 and October 24, 2098
May 31–June 1	March 19–20	January 5–6	October 24–25	August 12–13
118	120	122	124	126
June 1, 2011	March 20, 2015	January 6, 2019	October 25, 2022	August 12, 2026
128	130	132	134	136
June 1, 2030	March 20, 2034	January 5, 2038	October 25, 2041	August 12, 2045
138	140	142	144	146
May 31, 2049	March 20, 2053	January 5, 2057	October 24, 2060	August 12, 2064
148	150	152	154	156
May 31, 2068	March 19, 2072	January 6, 2076	October 24, 2079	August 13, 2083
158	160	162	164	
June 1, 2087			October 24, 2098	

=== Tritos series ===
This eclipse is a part of a tritos cycle, repeating at alternating nodes every 135 synodic months (≈ 3986.63 days, or 11 years minus 1 month). Their appearance and longitude are irregular due to a lack of synchronization with the anomalistic month (period of perigee), but groupings of 3 tritos cycles (≈ 33 years minus 3 months) come close (≈ 434.044 anomalistic months), so eclipses are similar in these groupings.

Series members between 1801 and 2200
February 21, 1803 (Saros 127)	January 21, 1814 (Saros 128)	December 20, 1824 (Saros 129)	November 20, 1835 (Saros 130)	October 20, 1846 (Saros 131)
September 18, 1857 (Saros 132)	August 18, 1868 (Saros 133)	July 19, 1879 (Saros 134)	June 17, 1890 (Saros 135)	May 18, 1901 (Saros 136)
April 17, 1912 (Saros 137)	March 17, 1923 (Saros 138)	February 14, 1934 (Saros 139)	January 14, 1945 (Saros 140)	December 14, 1955 (Saros 141)
November 12, 1966 (Saros 142)	October 12, 1977 (Saros 143)	September 11, 1988 (Saros 144)	August 11, 1999 (Saros 145)	July 11, 2010 (Saros 146)
June 10, 2021 (Saros 147)	May 9, 2032 (Saros 148)	April 9, 2043 (Saros 149)	March 9, 2054 (Saros 150)	February 5, 2065 (Saros 151)
January 6, 2076 (Saros 152)	December 6, 2086 (Saros 153)	November 4, 2097 (Saros 154)	October 5, 2108 (Saros 155)	September 5, 2119 (Saros 156)
August 4, 2130 (Saros 157)	July 3, 2141 (Saros 158)	June 3, 2152 (Saros 159)		April 1, 2174 (Saros 161)

=== Inex series ===
This eclipse is a part of the long period inex cycle, repeating at alternating nodes, every 358 synodic months (≈ 10,571.95 days, or 29 years minus 20 days). Their appearance and longitude are irregular due to a lack of synchronization with the anomalistic month (period of perigee). However, groupings of 3 inex cycles (≈ 87 years minus 2 months) comes close (≈ 1,151.02 anomalistic months), so eclipses are similar in these groupings.

Series members between 1801 and 2200
July 6, 1815 (Saros 143)	June 16, 1844 (Saros 144)	May 26, 1873 (Saros 145)
May 7, 1902 (Saros 146)	April 18, 1931 (Saros 147)	March 27, 1960 (Saros 148)
March 7, 1989 (Saros 149)	February 15, 2018 (Saros 150)	January 26, 2047 (Saros 151)
January 6, 2076 (Saros 152)	December 17, 2104 (Saros 153)	November 26, 2133 (Saros 154)
November 7, 2162 (Saros 155)	October 18, 2191 (Saros 156)	
