= Solar eclipse of May 20, 1966 =

20th-century annular solar eclipse

- Annular eclipse
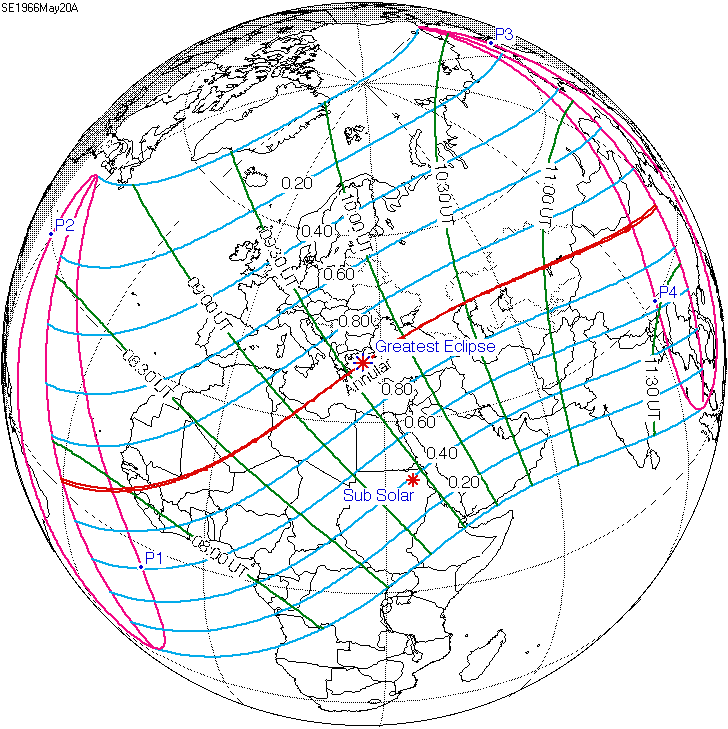
- Map
- Gamma: 0.3467
- Magnitude: 0.9991

Maximum eclipse
- Duration: 5 s (0 min 5 s)
- Coordinates: 39.2°N 26.4°E
- Max. width of band: 3 km (1.9 mi)

Times (UTC)
- Greatest eclipse: 9:39:02

References
- Saros: 137 (33 of 70)
- Catalog # (SE5000): 9434

An annular solar eclipse occurred at the Moon's ascending node of orbit on Friday, May 20, 1966, with a magnitude of 0.9991. A solar eclipse occurs when the Moon passes between Earth and the Sun, thereby totally or partly obscuring the image of the Sun for a viewer on Earth. An annular solar eclipse occurs when the Moon's apparent diameter is smaller than the Sun's, blocking most of the Sun's light and causing the Sun to look like an annulus (ring). An annular eclipse appears as a partial eclipse over a region of the Earth thousands of kilometres wide. The Moon's apparent diameter was near the average diameter because it occurred 6.8 days after apogee (on May 13, 1966, at 14:00 UTC) and 7.2 days before perigee (on May 27, 1966, at 15:00 UTC).

Annularity was visible from Guinea (including the capital city Conakry), Mali, Algeria, Libya, Greece, Turkey, the Soviet Union (today's Russia and Kazakhstan) and China. A partial eclipse was visible for parts of North Africa, Central Africa, Northeast Africa, Europe, West Asia, Central Asia, North Asia, and South Asia.

== Observations ==
During this eclipse, the apex of the moon's umbral cone was very close to the Earth's surface, and the magnitude was very large. The edges of the moon and the sun were very close to each other as seen from the Earth. Baily's beads on the lunar limb, which are usually only visible during a total solar eclipse, could also be seen. Therefore this eclipse was also an excellent opportunity to measure the size and shape of the Earth, as well as the mountains and valleys on the lunar limb. Many scientists observed the annular eclipse in Greece and Turkey, which are close to the location of maximum eclipse and have better observation conditions. The observation sites in Greece were mainly concentrated in Saronida and Anavyssos south of Athens, while those in Turkey were mainly concentrated in Ayvalik, across the sea facing the Greek island Lesbos.

Similar to the Baily's beads, the corona is generally only visible in a total solar eclipse. Because the magnitude of this annular eclipse was close to 1, some predicted that the corona would be visible. An observation team went to Lesbos Island but only saw the Baily's beads, not the corona.

Prior to it, the two hybrid solar eclipses of April 17, 1912 and April 28, 1930, and another annular solar eclipse of May 9, 1948 also belonging to Solar Saros 137, also occurred with a magnitude close to 1. Observations were made near Paris in France, Camptonville, California and Rebun Island in Japan respectively.

== Eclipse details ==
Shown below are two tables displaying details about this particular solar eclipse. The first table outlines times at which the Moon's penumbra or umbra attains the specific parameter, and the second table describes various other parameters pertaining to this eclipse.

May 20, 1966 Solar Eclipse Times
| Event | Time (UTC) |
|---|---|
| First Penumbral External Contact | 1966 May 20 at 06:50:51.2 UTC |
| First Umbral External Contact | 1966 May 20 at 07:54:07.8 UTC |
| First Central Line | 1966 May 20 at 07:54:41.4 UTC |
| Greatest Duration | 1966 May 20 at 07:54:41.4 UTC |
| First Umbral Internal Contact | 1966 May 20 at 07:55:14.9 UTC |
| First Penumbral Internal Contact | 1966 May 20 at 09:07:24.3 UTC |
| Greatest Eclipse | 1966 May 20 at 09:39:01.6 UTC |
| Ecliptic Conjunction | 1966 May 20 at 09:42:51.0 UTC |
| Equatorial Conjunction | 1966 May 20 at 09:51:45.8 UTC |
| Last Penumbral Internal Contact | 1966 May 20 at 10:10:21.8 UTC |
| Last Umbral Internal Contact | 1966 May 20 at 11:22:42.3 UTC |
| Last Central Line | 1966 May 20 at 11:23:12.9 UTC |
| Last Umbral External Contact | 1966 May 20 at 11:23:43.5 UTC |
| Last Penumbral External Contact | 1966 May 20 at 12:27:00.2 UTC |

May 20, 1966 Solar Eclipse Parameters
| Parameter | Value |
|---|---|
| Eclipse Magnitude | 0.99915 |
| Eclipse Obscuration | 0.99830 |
| Gamma | 0.34672 |
| Sun Right Ascension | 03h46m47.1s |
| Sun Declination | +19°55'23.3" |
| Sun Semi-Diameter | 15'48.2" |
| Sun Equatorial Horizontal Parallax | 08.7" |
| Moon Right Ascension | 03h46m20.7s |
| Moon Declination | +20°14'08.1" |
| Moon Semi-Diameter | 15'33.4" |
| Moon Equatorial Horizontal Parallax | 0°57'05.7" |
| ΔT | 36.9 s |

== Eclipse season ==
This eclipse is part of an eclipse season, a period, roughly every six months, when eclipses occur. Only two (or occasionally three) eclipse seasons occur each year, and each season lasts about 35 days and repeats just short of six months (173 days) later; thus two full eclipse seasons always occur each year. Either two or three eclipses happen each eclipse season. In the sequence below, each eclipse is separated by a fortnight.

Eclipse season of May 1966
| May 4 Descending node (full moon) | May 20 Ascending node (new moon) |
|---|---|
| Penumbral lunar eclipse Lunar Saros 111 | Annular solar eclipse Solar Saros 137 |

== Related eclipses ==
=== Eclipses in 1966 ===
- A penumbral lunar eclipse on May 4.
- An annular solar eclipse on May 20.
- A penumbral lunar eclipse on October 29.
- A total solar eclipse on November 12.

=== Metonic ===
- Preceded by: Solar eclipse of July 31, 1962
- Followed by: Solar eclipse of March 7, 1970

=== Tzolkinex ===
- Preceded by: Solar eclipse of April 8, 1959
- Followed by: Solar eclipse of June 30, 1973

=== Half-Saros ===
- Preceded by: Lunar eclipse of May 13, 1957
- Followed by: Lunar eclipse of May 25, 1975

=== Tritos ===
- Preceded by: Solar eclipse of June 20, 1955
- Followed by: Solar eclipse of April 18, 1977

=== Solar Saros 137 ===
- Preceded by: Solar eclipse of May 9, 1948
- Followed by: Solar eclipse of May 30, 1984

=== Inex ===
- Preceded by: Solar eclipse of June 8, 1937
- Followed by: Solar eclipse of April 29, 1995

=== Triad ===
- Preceded by: Solar eclipse of July 19, 1879
- Followed by: Solar eclipse of March 20, 2053

=== Solar eclipses of 1964–1967 ===
This eclipse is a member of a semester series. An eclipse in a semester series of solar eclipses repeats approximately every 177 days and 4 hours (a semester) at alternating nodes of the Moon's orbit.

The partial solar eclipses on January 14, 1964 and July 9, 1964 occur in the previous lunar year eclipse set.

Solar eclipse series sets from 1964 to 1967
| Ascending node | | | Descending node | | |
| Saros | Map | Gamma | Saros | Map | Gamma |
| 117 | June 10, 1964 Partial | −1.1393 | 122 | December 4, 1964 Partial | 1.1193 |
| 127 | May 30, 1965 Total | −0.4225 | 132 | November 23, 1965 Annular | 0.3906 |
| 137 | May 20, 1966 Annular | 0.3467 | 142 | November 12, 1966 Total | −0.33 |
| 147 | May 9, 1967 Partial | 1.1422 | 152 | November 2, 1967 Total (non-central) | 1.0007 |

=== Saros 137 ===
This eclipse is a part of Saros series 137, repeating every 18 years, 11 days, and containing 70 events. The series started with a partial solar eclipse on May 25, 1389. It contains total eclipses from August 20, 1533 through December 6, 1695; the first set of hybrid eclipses from December 17, 1713 through February 11, 1804; the first set of annular eclipses from February 21, 1822 through March 25, 1876; the second set of hybrid eclipses from April 6, 1894 through April 28, 1930; and the second set of annular eclipses from May 9, 1948 through April 13, 2507. The series ends at member 70 as a partial eclipse on June 28, 2633. Its eclipses are tabulated in three columns; every third eclipse in the same column is one exeligmos apart, so they all cast shadows over approximately the same parts of the Earth.

The longest duration of totality was produced by member 11 at 2 minutes, 55 seconds on September 10, 1569, and the longest duration of annularity will be produced by member 59 at 7 minutes, 5 seconds on February 28, 2435. All eclipses in this series occur at the Moon’s ascending node of orbit.

Series members 24–46 occur between 1801 and 2200:
| 24 | 25 | 26 |
|---|---|---|
| February 11, 1804 | February 21, 1822 | March 4, 1840 |
| 27 | 28 | 29 |
| March 15, 1858 | March 25, 1876 | April 6, 1894 |
| 30 | 31 | 32 |
| April 17, 1912 | April 28, 1930 | May 9, 1948 |
| 33 | 34 | 35 |
| May 20, 1966 | May 30, 1984 | June 10, 2002 |
| 36 | 37 | 38 |
| June 21, 2020 | July 2, 2038 | July 12, 2056 |
| 39 | 40 | 41 |
| July 24, 2074 | August 3, 2092 | August 15, 2110 |
| 42 | 43 | 44 |
| August 25, 2128 | September 6, 2146 | September 16, 2164 |
| 45 | 46 | |
| September 27, 2182 | October 9, 2200 | |

=== Metonic series ===
The metonic series repeats eclipses every 19 years (6939.69 days), lasting about 5 cycles. Eclipses occur in nearly the same calendar date. In addition, the octon subseries repeats 1/5 of that or every 3.8 years (1387.94 days). All eclipses in this table occur at the Moon's ascending node.

22 eclipse events between December 24, 1916 and July 31, 2000
| December 24–25 | October 12 | July 31–August 1 | May 19–20 | March 7 |
| 111 | 113 | 115 | 117 | 119 |
|---|---|---|---|---|
| December 24, 1916 | | July 31, 1924 | May 19, 1928 | March 7, 1932 |
| 121 | 123 | 125 | 127 | 129 |
| December 25, 1935 | October 12, 1939 | August 1, 1943 | May 20, 1947 | March 7, 1951 |
| 131 | 133 | 135 | 137 | 139 |
| December 25, 1954 | October 12, 1958 | July 31, 1962 | May 20, 1966 | March 7, 1970 |
| 141 | 143 | 145 | 147 | 149 |
| December 24, 1973 | October 12, 1977 | July 31, 1981 | May 19, 1985 | March 7, 1989 |
| 151 | 153 | 155 | | |
| December 24, 1992 | October 12, 1996 | July 31, 2000 | | |

=== Tritos series ===
This eclipse is a part of a tritos cycle, repeating at alternating nodes every 135 synodic months (≈ 3986.63 days, or 11 years minus 1 month). Their appearance and longitude are irregular due to a lack of synchronization with the anomalistic month (period of perigee), but groupings of 3 tritos cycles (≈ 33 years minus 3 months) come close (≈ 434.044 anomalistic months), so eclipses are similar in these groupings.

Series members between 1801 and 2200
| August 28, 1802 (Saros 122) | July 27, 1813 (Saros 123) | June 26, 1824 (Saros 124) | May 27, 1835 (Saros 125) | April 25, 1846 (Saros 126) |
| March 25, 1857 (Saros 127) | February 23, 1868 (Saros 128) | January 22, 1879 (Saros 129) | December 22, 1889 (Saros 130) | November 22, 1900 (Saros 131) |
| October 22, 1911 (Saros 132) | September 21, 1922 (Saros 133) | August 21, 1933 (Saros 134) | July 20, 1944 (Saros 135) | June 20, 1955 (Saros 136) |
| May 20, 1966 (Saros 137) | April 18, 1977 (Saros 138) | March 18, 1988 (Saros 139) | February 16, 1999 (Saros 140) | January 15, 2010 (Saros 141) |
| December 14, 2020 (Saros 142) | November 14, 2031 (Saros 143) | October 14, 2042 (Saros 144) | September 12, 2053 (Saros 145) | August 12, 2064 (Saros 146) |
| July 13, 2075 (Saros 147) | June 11, 2086 (Saros 148) | May 11, 2097 (Saros 149) | April 11, 2108 (Saros 150) | March 11, 2119 (Saros 151) |
| February 8, 2130 (Saros 152) | January 8, 2141 (Saros 153) | December 8, 2151 (Saros 154) | November 7, 2162 (Saros 155) | October 7, 2173 (Saros 156) |
| September 4, 2184 (Saros 157) | August 5, 2195 (Saros 158) | | | |

=== Inex series ===
This eclipse is a part of the long period inex cycle, repeating at alternating nodes, every 358 synodic months (≈ 10,571.95 days, or 29 years minus 20 days). Their appearance and longitude are irregular due to a lack of synchronization with the anomalistic month (period of perigee). However, groupings of 3 inex cycles (≈ 87 years minus 2 months) comes close (≈ 1,151.02 anomalistic months), so eclipses are similar in these groupings.

Series members between 1801 and 2200
| August 27, 1821 (Saros 132) | August 7, 1850 (Saros 133) | July 19, 1879 (Saros 134) |
| June 28, 1908 (Saros 135) | June 8, 1937 (Saros 136) | May 20, 1966 (Saros 137) |
| April 29, 1995 (Saros 138) | April 8, 2024 (Saros 139) | March 20, 2053 (Saros 140) |
| February 27, 2082 (Saros 141) | February 8, 2111 (Saros 142) | January 20, 2140 (Saros 143) |
| December 29, 2168 (Saros 144) | December 9, 2197 (Saros 145) | |
