= Solar eclipse of March 7, 1970 =

Total eclipse

- Total eclipse
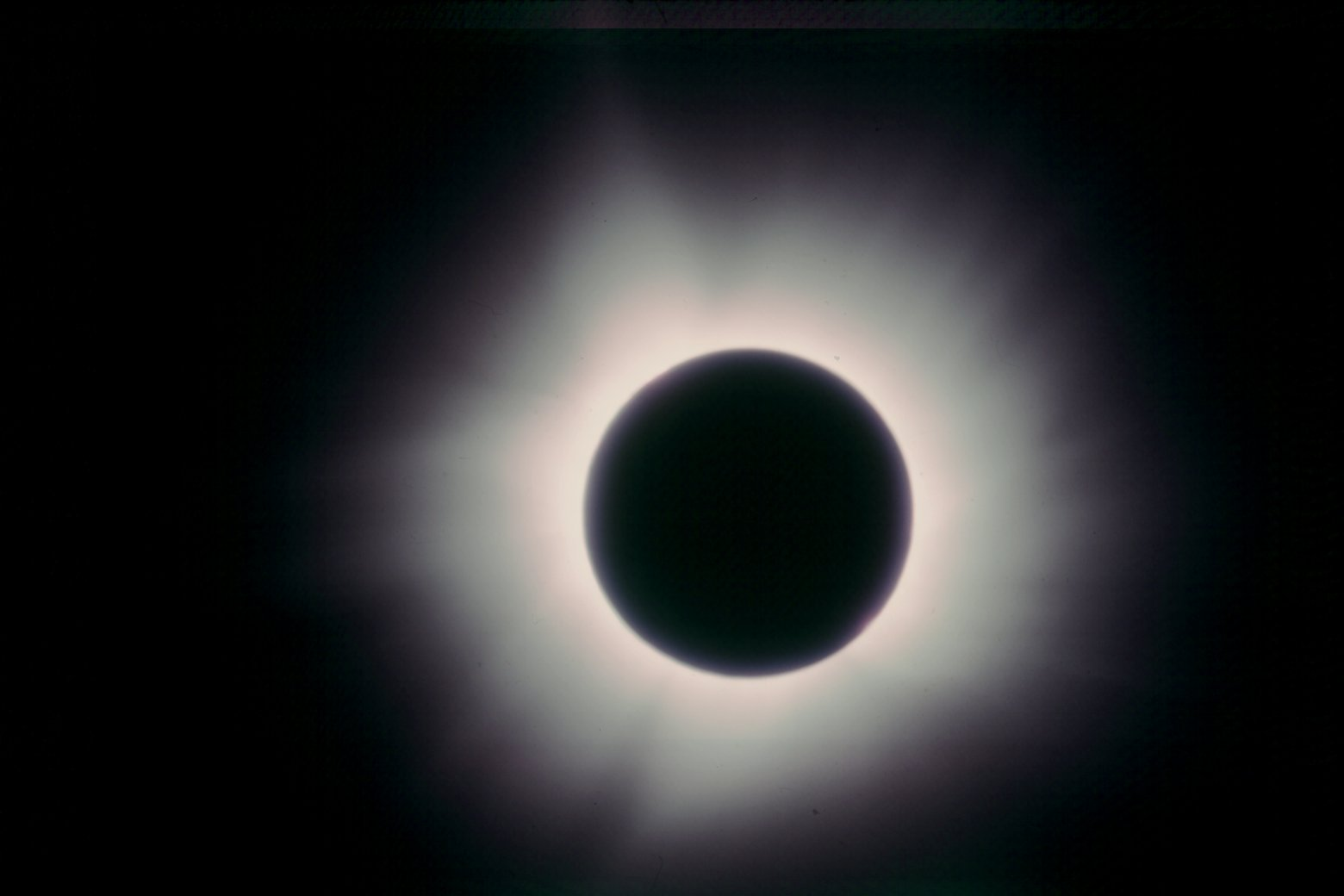
- Totality from Williamston, NC

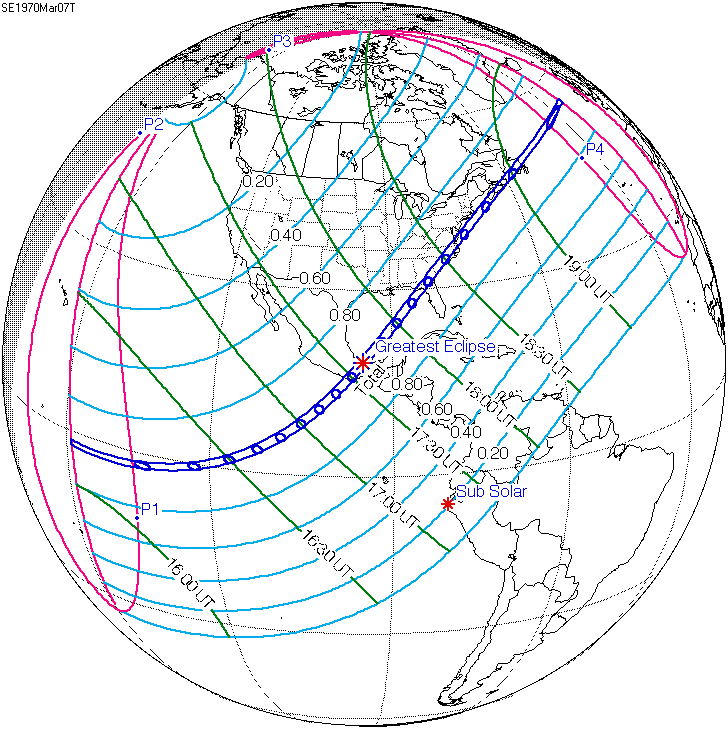
- Map
- Gamma: 0.4473
- Magnitude: 1.0414

Maximum eclipse
- Duration: 208 s (3 min 28 s)
- Coordinates: 18.2°N 94.7°W
- Max. width of band: 153 km (95 mi)

Times (UTC)
- Greatest eclipse: 17:38:30

References
- Saros: 139 (27 of 71)
- Catalog # (SE5000): 9442

A total solar eclipse occurred at the Moon's ascending node of orbit on Saturday, March 7, 1970, with a magnitude of 1.0414. A solar eclipse occurs when the Moon passes between Earth and the Sun, thereby totally or partly obscuring the image of the Sun for a viewer on Earth. A total solar eclipse occurs when the Moon's apparent diameter is larger than the Sun's, blocking all direct sunlight, turning day into darkness. Totality occurs in a narrow path across Earth's surface, with the partial solar eclipse visible over a surrounding region thousands of kilometres wide. Occurring about 1.3 days after perigee (on March 6, 1970, at 10:30 UTC), this eclipse occurred when the Moon's apparent diameter was larger.

The greatest eclipse occurred over Mexico at 11:38 am CST, with totality lasting 3 minutes and 27.65 seconds. Totality over the U.S. lasted up to 3 minutes and 10 seconds. The media declared Perry as the first municipality in Florida to be in the eclipse direct path.

Inclement weather obstructed the viewing from that location and most of the eclipse path through the remainder of the southern states. There was not an eclipse with a greater duration of totality over the contiguous U.S. until April 8, 2024, a period of 54 years.

Totality was visible across southern Mexico and the Gulf of Mexico, Florida, Georgia, South Carolina, North Carolina, Virginia, Maryland, and Nantucket, Massachusetts in the United States, northeast to the Maritimes of eastern Canada, and northern Miquelon-Langlade in the French overseas collectivity of Saint Pierre and Miquelon. A partial eclipse was visible for parts of Hawaii, North America, Central America, the Caribbean, and northern South America.

== Scientific effects ==
This eclipse slowed a radio transmission of atomic time from North Carolina to Washington, D.C.

Animation of eclipse path (3 minutes per frame)

== Observations ==
An observation team from the Swiss Federal Observatory observed the total eclipse in Nejapa and Miahuatlán, Mexico. The weather conditions were good at both locations. Miahuatlán offered particularly good observation conditions with an altitude of 1,620 metres above sea level, high air quality and solar zenith angle of 63° at the time of the eclipse. The team took images of the corona and analyzed them with a polarizing filter. Austrian-American physicist Erwin Saxl and American physicist Mildred Allen reported anomalous changes in the period of a torsion pendulum when observing a partial solar eclipse with a magnitude of 0.954 from Harvard, Massachusetts, called the "Saxl Effect".

=== Visible Planets and Stars ===
During totality, other celestial objects brighter than magnitude 1.5 often become visible. By far the brightest and therefore easiest object seen around totality on 7/3/1970 was Venus, which lay about an hour east of the eclipsed Sun. Mars and Saturn were about three hours east of the Sun with Saturn the brighter planet, while Mercury, 16 days away from superior conjunction (and therefore showing most of its sunlit side, making it bright), was an hour or so west of the Sun. Of the stars, Fomalhaut was almost due south of the Sun, the Summer Triangle of Vega, Deneb and Altair was well up in the west, and recently risen Aldebaran and Capella were in the east and northeast respectively.

== In popular culture ==
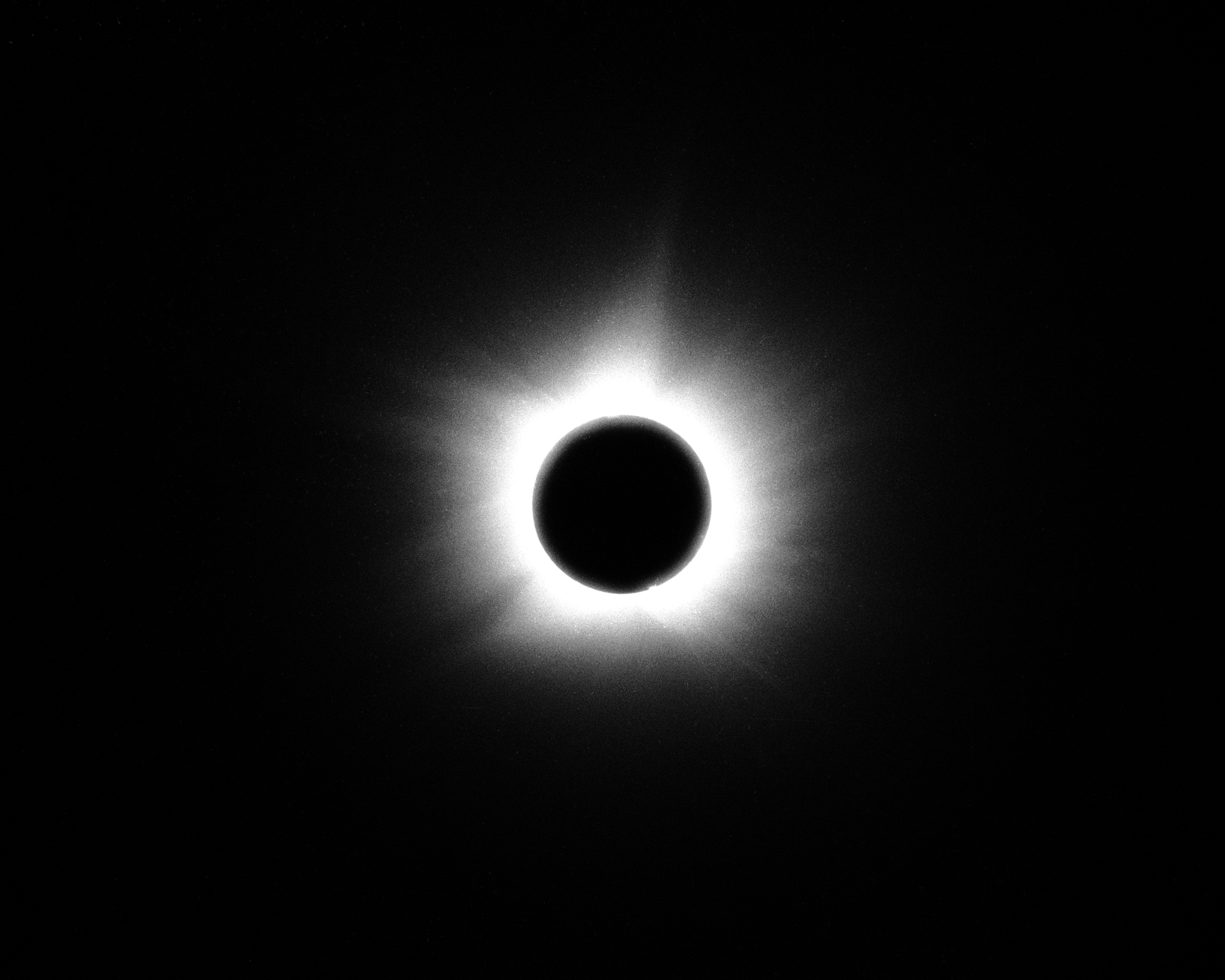
Totality as seen from Virginia Beach, VA

CBS showed the first color broadcast of a total eclipse.

This eclipse might be referenced in the second episode of the first season of The Mary Tyler Moore Show when a guest of Mary's accidentally exposes a roll of film that Howard Arnell, an ex-boyfriend of Mary's, says, "It's just the pictures I took of the total eclipse of the sun."

The eclipse may be referenced in the 1972 hit popular song “You're So Vain” by Carly Simon, although in context, the lyrics more closely align with a different eclipse two years later.

== Eclipse details ==
Shown below are two tables displaying details about this particular solar eclipse. The first table outlines times at which the Moon's penumbra or umbra attains the specific parameter, and the second table describes various other parameters pertaining to this eclipse.

March 7, 1970 Solar Eclipse Times
Event	Time (UTC)
First Penumbral External Contact	1970 March 7 at 15:04:56.2 UTC
First Umbral External Contact	1970 March 7 at 16:04:26.6 UTC
First Central Line	1970 March 7 at 16:05:14.2 UTC
First Umbral Internal Contact	1970 March 7 at 16:06:01.9 UTC
First Penumbral Internal Contact	1970 March 7 at 17:27:53.7 UTC
Greatest Duration	1970 March 7 at 17:35:20.9 UTC
Greatest Eclipse	1970 March 7 at 17:38:29.7 UTC
Ecliptic Conjunction	1970 March 7 at 17:43:07.4 UTC
Last Penumbral Internal Contact	1970 March 7 at 17:48:30.7 UTC
Equatorial Conjunction	1970 March 7 at 18:03:52.1 UTC
Last Umbral Internal Contact	1970 March 7 at 19:10:43.5 UTC
Last Central Line	1970 March 7 at 19:11:29.8 UTC
Last Umbral External Contact	1970 March 7 at 19:12:16.1 UTC
Last Penumbral External Contact	1970 March 7 at 20:11:56.2 UTC

March 7, 1970 Solar Eclipse Parameters
Parameter	Value
Eclipse Magnitude	1.04145
Eclipse Obscuration	1.08461
Gamma	0.44728
Sun Right Ascension	23h11m11.6s
Sun Declination	-05°14'13.6"
Sun Semi-Diameter	16'06.8"
Sun Equatorial Horizontal Parallax	08.9"
Moon Right Ascension	23h10m19.7s
Moon Declination	-04°50'27.0"
Moon Semi-Diameter	16'31.8"
Moon Equatorial Horizontal Parallax	1°00'39.8"
ΔT	40.4 s

== Eclipse season ==
This eclipse is part of an eclipse season, a period, roughly every six months, when eclipses occur. Only two (or occasionally three) eclipse seasons occur each year, and each season lasts about 35 days and repeats just short of six months (173 days) later; thus two full eclipse seasons always occur each year. Either two or three eclipses happen each eclipse season. In the sequence below, each eclipse is separated by a fortnight.

Eclipse season of February–March 1970
February 21 Descending node (full moon)	March 7 Ascending node (new moon)
Partial lunar eclipse Lunar Saros 113	Total solar eclipse Solar Saros 139

== Related eclipses ==
=== Eclipses in 1970 ===
- A partial lunar eclipse on February 21.
- A total solar eclipse on March 7.
- A partial lunar eclipse on August 17.
- An annular solar eclipse on August 31.

=== Metonic ===
- Preceded by: Solar eclipse of May 20, 1966
- Followed by: Solar eclipse of December 24, 1973

=== Tzolkinex ===
- Preceded by: Solar eclipse of January 25, 1963
- Followed by: Solar eclipse of April 18, 1977

=== Half-Saros ===
- Preceded by: Lunar eclipse of March 2, 1961
- Followed by: Lunar eclipse of March 13, 1979

=== Tritos ===
- Preceded by: Solar eclipse of April 8, 1959
- Followed by: Solar eclipse of February 4, 1981

=== Solar Saros 139 ===
- Preceded by: Solar eclipse of February 25, 1952
- Followed by: Solar eclipse of March 18, 1988

=== Inex ===
- Preceded by: Solar eclipse of March 27, 1941
- Followed by: Solar eclipse of February 16, 1999

=== Triad ===
- Preceded by: Solar eclipse of May 6, 1883
- Followed by: Solar eclipse of January 5, 2057

=== Solar eclipses of 1968–1971 ===
This eclipse is a member of a semester series. An eclipse in a semester series of solar eclipses repeats approximately every 177 days and 4 hours (a semester) at alternating nodes of the Moon's orbit.

The partial solar eclipse on July 22, 1971 occurs in the next lunar year eclipse set.

Solar eclipse series sets from 1968 to 1971
Ascending node			Descending node		
Saros	Map	Gamma	Saros	Map	Gamma
119	March 28, 1968 Partial	−1.037	124	September 22, 1968 Total	0.9451
129	March 18, 1969 Annular	−0.2704	134	September 11, 1969 Annular	0.2201
139 Totality in Williamston, NC; USA	March 7, 1970 Total	0.4473	144	August 31, 1970 Annular	−0.5364
149	February 25, 1971 Partial	1.1188	154	August 20, 1971 Partial	−1.2659

=== Saros 139 ===
This eclipse is a part of Saros series 139, repeating every 18 years, 11 days, and containing 71 events. The series started with a partial solar eclipse on May 17, 1501. It contains hybrid eclipses from August 11, 1627 through December 9, 1825 and total eclipses from December 21, 1843 through March 26, 2601. There are no annular eclipses in this set. The series ends at member 71 as a partial eclipse on July 3, 2763. Its eclipses are tabulated in three columns; every third eclipse in the same column is one exeligmos apart, so they all cast shadows over approximately the same parts of the Earth.

The longest duration of totality will be produced by member 61 at 7 minutes, 29.22 seconds on July 16, 2186. This date is the longest solar eclipse computed between 4000 BC and AD 6000. All eclipses in this series occur at the Moon’s ascending node of orbit.

Series members 18–39 occur between 1801 and 2200:
18	19	20
November 29, 1807	December 9, 1825	December 21, 1843
21	22	23
December 31, 1861	January 11, 1880	January 22, 1898
24	25	26
February 3, 1916	February 14, 1934	February 25, 1952
27	28	29
March 7, 1970	March 18, 1988	March 29, 2006
30	31	32
April 8, 2024	April 20, 2042	April 30, 2060
33	34	35
May 11, 2078	May 22, 2096	June 3, 2114
36	37	38
June 13, 2132	June 25, 2150	July 5, 2168
39
July 16, 2186

=== Metonic series ===
The metonic series repeats eclipses every 19 years (6939.69 days), lasting about 5 cycles. Eclipses occur in nearly the same calendar date. In addition, the octon subseries repeats 1/5 of that or every 3.8 years (1387.94 days). All eclipses in this table occur at the Moon's ascending node.

22 eclipse events between December 24, 1916 and July 31, 2000
December 24–25	October 12	July 31–August 1	May 19–20	March 7
111	113	115	117	119
December 24, 1916		July 31, 1924	May 19, 1928	March 7, 1932
121	123	125	127	129
December 25, 1935	October 12, 1939	August 1, 1943	May 20, 1947	March 7, 1951
131	133	135	137	139
December 25, 1954	October 12, 1958	July 31, 1962	May 20, 1966	March 7, 1970
141	143	145	147	149
December 24, 1973	October 12, 1977	July 31, 1981	May 19, 1985	March 7, 1989
151	153	155		
December 24, 1992	October 12, 1996	July 31, 2000		

=== Tritos series ===
This eclipse is a part of a tritos cycle, repeating at alternating nodes every 135 synodic months (≈ 3986.63 days, or 11 years minus 1 month). Their appearance and longitude are irregular due to a lack of synchronization with the anomalistic month (period of perigee), but groupings of 3 tritos cycles (≈ 33 years minus 3 months) come close (≈ 434.044 anomalistic months), so eclipses are similar in these groupings.

Series members between 1801 and 2200
June 16, 1806 (Saros 124)	May 16, 1817 (Saros 125)	April 14, 1828 (Saros 126)	March 15, 1839 (Saros 127)	February 12, 1850 (Saros 128)
January 11, 1861 (Saros 129)	December 12, 1871 (Saros 130)	November 10, 1882 (Saros 131)	October 9, 1893 (Saros 132)	September 9, 1904 (Saros 133)
August 10, 1915 (Saros 134)	July 9, 1926 (Saros 135)	June 8, 1937 (Saros 136)	May 9, 1948 (Saros 137)	April 8, 1959 (Saros 138)
March 7, 1970 (Saros 139)	February 4, 1981 (Saros 140)	January 4, 1992 (Saros 141)	December 4, 2002 (Saros 142)	November 3, 2013 (Saros 143)
October 2, 2024 (Saros 144)	September 2, 2035 (Saros 145)	August 2, 2046 (Saros 146)	July 1, 2057 (Saros 147)	May 31, 2068 (Saros 148)
May 1, 2079 (Saros 149)	March 31, 2090 (Saros 150)	February 28, 2101 (Saros 151)	January 29, 2112 (Saros 152)	December 28, 2122 (Saros 153)
November 26, 2133 (Saros 154)	October 26, 2144 (Saros 155)	September 26, 2155 (Saros 156)	August 25, 2166 (Saros 157)	July 25, 2177 (Saros 158)
June 24, 2188 (Saros 159)	May 24, 2199 (Saros 160)			

=== Inex series ===
This eclipse is a part of the long period inex cycle, repeating at alternating nodes, every 358 synodic months (≈ 10,571.95 days, or 29 years minus 20 days). Their appearance and longitude are irregular due to a lack of synchronization with the anomalistic month (period of perigee). However, groupings of 3 inex cycles (≈ 87 years minus 2 months) comes close (≈ 1,151.02 anomalistic months), so eclipses are similar in these groupings.

Series members between 1801 and 2200
June 16, 1825 (Saros 134)	May 26, 1854 (Saros 135)	May 6, 1883 (Saros 136)
April 17, 1912 (Saros 137)	March 27, 1941 (Saros 138)	March 7, 1970 (Saros 139)
February 16, 1999 (Saros 140)	January 26, 2028 (Saros 141)	January 5, 2057 (Saros 142)
December 16, 2085 (Saros 143)	November 27, 2114 (Saros 144)	November 7, 2143 (Saros 145)
October 17, 2172 (Saros 146)		
