= Solar eclipse of November 12, 1966 =

Total eclipse

- Total eclipse
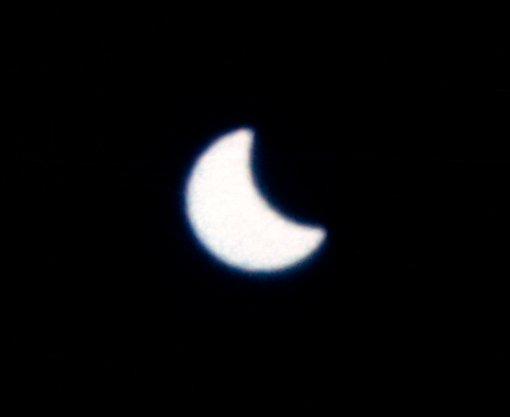
- The eclipse as viewed from Gemini XII

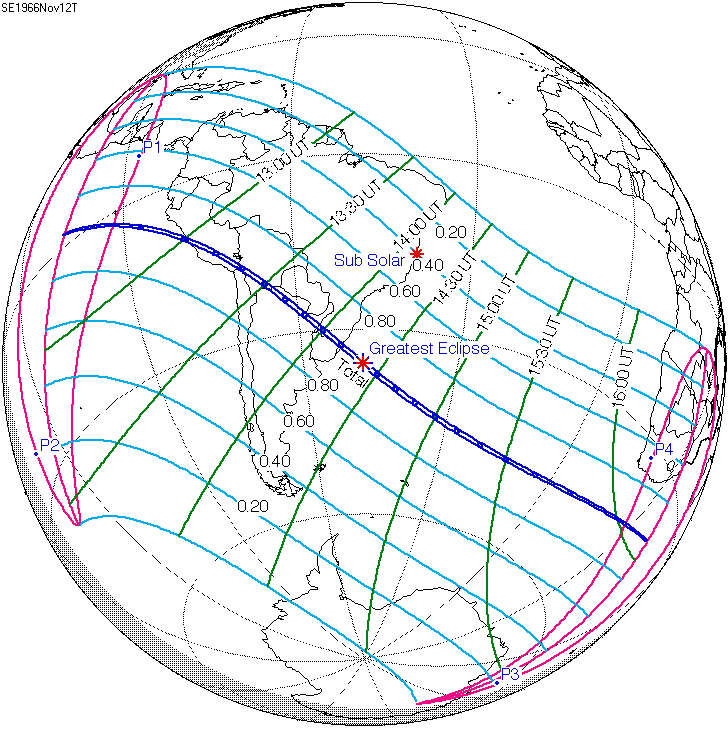
- Map
- Gamma: −0.33
- Magnitude: 1.0234

Maximum eclipse
- Duration: 117 s (1 min 57 s)
- Coordinates: 35.6°S 48.2°W
- Max. width of band: 84 km (52 mi)

Times (UTC)
- Greatest eclipse: 14:23:28

References
- Saros: 142 (20 of 72)
- Catalog # (SE5000): 9435

A total solar eclipse occurred at the Moon's descending node of orbit on Saturday, November 12, 1966, with a magnitude of 1.0234. A solar eclipse occurs when the Moon passes between Earth and the Sun, thereby totally or partly obscuring the image of the Sun for a viewer on Earth. A total solar eclipse occurs when the Moon's apparent diameter is larger than the Sun's, blocking all direct sunlight, turning day into darkness. Totality occurs in a narrow path across Earth's surface, with the partial solar eclipse visible over a surrounding region thousands of kilometres wide. Occurring about 2.25 days after perigee (on November 10, 1966, at 8:40 UTC), the Moon's apparent diameter was larger.

The path of totality cut a swath across South America from north of Lima, Peru, passing the northeastern tip of Chile, Bolivia, Northwest of Argentina, southwestern tip of Ñeembucú Department in Paraguay, nearly to the southernmost tip of Brazil. A partial eclipse was visible for parts of Central America, the Caribbean, South America, Antarctica, and Southern Africa.

== Observations ==
The NASA Gemini XII mission observed this total eclipse from space:

The Canary Island controller greeted the crew in the morning with the news that there would be a second maneuver - 5 meters forward - to line the vehicles up properly. The prospects panned out richly, and the crew reported seeing the eclipse "right on the money at 16:01:44 g.e.t." Although the crew thought for a moment that they were slightly off track, their aim had actually been accurate.

The 28 October 1966 launch of the U.S. Air Force's Orbiting Vehicle 3-2 (OV3-2) was timed such that it could observe ambient charged particle variations before, during, and after the eclipse.

== Eclipse details ==
Shown below are two tables displaying details about this particular solar eclipse. The first table outlines times at which the Moon's penumbra or umbra attains the specific parameter, and the second table describes various other parameters pertaining to this eclipse.

November 12, 1966 Solar Eclipse Times
| Event | Time (UTC) |
|---|---|
| First Penumbral External Contact | 1966 November 12 at 11:43:29.6 UTC |
| First Umbral External Contact | 1966 November 12 at 12:43:07.1 UTC |
| First Central Line | 1966 November 12 at 12:43:20.6 UTC |
| First Umbral Internal Contact | 1966 November 12 at 12:43:34.2 UTC |
| First Penumbral Internal Contact | 1966 November 12 at 13:50:12.8 UTC |
| Greatest Eclipse | 1966 November 12 at 14:23:27.6 UTC |
| Greatest Duration | 1966 November 12 at 14:24:40.6 UTC |
| Ecliptic Conjunction | 1966 November 12 at 14:26:56.5 UTC |
| Equatorial Conjunction | 1966 November 12 at 14:37:07.7 UTC |
| Last Penumbral Internal Contact | 1966 November 12 at 14:56:22.2 UTC |
| Last Umbral Internal Contact | 1966 November 12 at 16:03:15.2 UTC |
| Last Central Line | 1966 November 12 at 16:03:26.4 UTC |
| Last Umbral External Contact | 1966 November 12 at 16:03:37.7 UTC |
| Last Penumbral External Contact | 1966 November 12 at 17:03:24.9 UTC |

November 12, 1966 Solar Eclipse Parameters
| Parameter | Value |
|---|---|
| Eclipse Magnitude | 1.02336 |
| Eclipse Obscuration | 1.04727 |
| Gamma | −0.33001 |
| Sun Right Ascension | 15h09m12.8s |
| Sun Declination | -17°40'44.2" |
| Sun Semi-Diameter | 16'09.6" |
| Sun Equatorial Horizontal Parallax | 08.9" |
| Moon Right Ascension | 15h08m42.7s |
| Moon Declination | -17°59'03.2" |
| Moon Semi-Diameter | 16'16.8" |
| Moon Equatorial Horizontal Parallax | 0°59'44.7" |
| ΔT | 37.3 s |

== Eclipse season ==
This eclipse is part of an eclipse season, a period, roughly every six months, when eclipses occur. Only two (or occasionally three) eclipse seasons occur each year, and each season lasts about 35 days and repeats just short of six months (173 days) later; thus, two full eclipse seasons always occur each year. Either two or three eclipses happen each eclipse season. In the sequence below, each eclipse is separated by a fortnight.

Eclipse season of October–November 1966
| October 29 Ascending node (full moon) | November 12 Descending node (new moon) |
|---|---|
| Penumbral lunar eclipse Lunar Saros 116 | Total solar eclipse Solar Saros 142 |

== Related eclipses ==
=== Eclipses in 1966 ===
- A penumbral lunar eclipse on May 4.
- An annular solar eclipse on May 20.
- A penumbral lunar eclipse on October 29.
- A total solar eclipse on November 12.

=== Metonic ===
- Preceded by: Solar eclipse of January 25, 1963
- Followed by: Solar eclipse of August 31, 1970

=== Tzolkinex ===
- Preceded by: Solar eclipse of October 2, 1959
- Followed by: Solar eclipse of December 24, 1973

=== Half-Saros ===
- Preceded by: Lunar eclipse of November 7, 1957
- Followed by: Lunar eclipse of November 18, 1975

=== Tritos ===
- Preceded by: Solar eclipse of December 14, 1955
- Followed by: Solar eclipse of October 12, 1977

=== Solar Saros 142 ===
- Preceded by: Solar eclipse of November 1, 1948
- Followed by: Solar eclipse of November 22, 1984

=== Inex ===
- Preceded by: Solar eclipse of December 2, 1937
- Followed by: Solar eclipse of October 24, 1995

=== Triad ===
- Preceded by: Solar eclipse of January 11, 1880
- Followed by: Solar eclipse of September 12, 2053

=== Solar eclipses of 1964–1967 ===
This eclipse is a member of a semester series. An eclipse in a semester series of solar eclipses repeats approximately every 177 days and 4 hours (a semester) at alternating nodes of the Moon's orbit.

The partial solar eclipses on January 14, 1964 and July 9, 1964 occur in the previous lunar year eclipse set.

Solar eclipse series sets from 1964 to 1967
| Ascending node | | | Descending node | | |
| Saros | Map | Gamma | Saros | Map | Gamma |
| 117 | June 10, 1964 Partial | −1.1393 | 122 | December 4, 1964 Partial | 1.1193 |
| 127 | May 30, 1965 Total | −0.4225 | 132 | November 23, 1965 Annular | 0.3906 |
| 137 | May 20, 1966 Annular | 0.3467 | 142 | November 12, 1966 Total | −0.33 |
| 147 | May 9, 1967 Partial | 1.1422 | 152 | November 2, 1967 Total (non-central) | 1.0007 |

=== Saros 142 ===
This eclipse is a part of Saros series 142, repeating every 18 years, 11 days, and containing 72 events. The series started with a partial solar eclipse on April 17, 1624. It contains a hybrid eclipse on July 14, 1768, and total eclipses from July 25, 1786 through October 29, 2543. There are no annular eclipses in this set. The series ends at member 72 as a partial eclipse on June 5, 2904. Its eclipses are tabulated in three columns; every third eclipse in the same column is one exeligmos apart, so they all cast shadows over approximately the same parts of the Earth.

The longest duration of totality will be produced by member 38 at 6 minutes, 34 seconds on May 28, 2291. All eclipses in this series occur at the Moon’s descending node of orbit.

Series members 11–32 occur between 1801 and 2200:
| 11 | 12 | 13 |
|---|---|---|
| August 5, 1804 | August 16, 1822 | August 27, 1840 |
| 14 | 15 | 16 |
| September 7, 1858 | September 17, 1876 | September 29, 1894 |
| 17 | 18 | 19 |
| October 10, 1912 | October 21, 1930 | November 1, 1948 |
| 20 | 21 | 22 |
| November 12, 1966 | November 22, 1984 | December 4, 2002 |
| 23 | 24 | 25 |
| December 14, 2020 | December 26, 2038 | January 5, 2057 |
| 26 | 27 | 28 |
| January 16, 2075 | January 27, 2093 | February 8, 2111 |
| 29 | 30 | 31 |
| February 18, 2129 | March 2, 2147 | March 12, 2165 |
32
March 23, 2183

=== Metonic series ===
The metonic series repeats eclipses every 19 years (6939.69 days), lasting about 5 cycles. Eclipses occur in nearly the same calendar date. In addition, the octon subseries repeats 1/5 of that or every 3.8 years (1387.94 days). All eclipses in this table occur at the Moon's descending node.

22 eclipse events between April 8, 1902 and August 31, 1989
| April 7–8 | January 24–25 | November 12 | August 31–September 1 | June 19–20 |
| 108 | 110 | 112 | 114 | 116 |
|---|---|---|---|---|
| April 8, 1902 | | | August 31, 1913 | June 19, 1917 |
| 118 | 120 | 122 | 124 | 126 |
| April 8, 1921 | January 24, 1925 | November 12, 1928 | August 31, 1932 | June 19, 1936 |
| 128 | 130 | 132 | 134 | 136 |
| April 7, 1940 | January 25, 1944 | November 12, 1947 | September 1, 1951 | June 20, 1955 |
| 138 | 140 | 142 | 144 | 146 |
| April 8, 1959 | January 25, 1963 | November 12, 1966 | August 31, 1970 | June 20, 1974 |
| 148 | 150 | 152 | 154 | |
| April 7, 1978 | January 25, 1982 | November 12, 1985 | August 31, 1989 | |

=== Tritos series ===
This eclipse is a part of a tritos cycle, repeating at alternating nodes every 135 synodic months (≈ 3986.63 days, or 11 years minus 1 month). Their appearance and longitude are irregular due to a lack of synchronization with the anomalistic month (period of perigee), but groupings of 3 tritos cycles (≈ 33 years minus 3 months) come close (≈ 434.044 anomalistic months), so eclipses are similar in these groupings.

Series members between 1801 and 2200
| February 21, 1803 (Saros 127) | January 21, 1814 (Saros 128) | December 20, 1824 (Saros 129) | November 20, 1835 (Saros 130) | October 20, 1846 (Saros 131) |
| September 18, 1857 (Saros 132) | August 18, 1868 (Saros 133) | July 19, 1879 (Saros 134) | June 17, 1890 (Saros 135) | May 18, 1901 (Saros 136) |
| April 17, 1912 (Saros 137) | March 17, 1923 (Saros 138) | February 14, 1934 (Saros 139) | January 14, 1945 (Saros 140) | December 14, 1955 (Saros 141) |
| November 12, 1966 (Saros 142) | October 12, 1977 (Saros 143) | September 11, 1988 (Saros 144) | August 11, 1999 (Saros 145) | July 11, 2010 (Saros 146) |
| June 10, 2021 (Saros 147) | May 9, 2032 (Saros 148) | April 9, 2043 (Saros 149) | March 9, 2054 (Saros 150) | February 5, 2065 (Saros 151) |
| January 6, 2076 (Saros 152) | December 6, 2086 (Saros 153) | November 4, 2097 (Saros 154) | October 5, 2108 (Saros 155) | September 5, 2119 (Saros 156) |
| August 4, 2130 (Saros 157) | July 3, 2141 (Saros 158) | June 3, 2152 (Saros 159) | | April 1, 2174 (Saros 161) |

=== Inex series ===
This eclipse is a part of the long period inex cycle, repeating at alternating nodes, every 358 synodic months (≈ 10,571.95 days, or 29 years minus 20 days). Their appearance and longitude are irregular due to a lack of synchronization with the anomalistic month (period of perigee). However, groupings of 3 inex cycles (≈ 87 years minus 2 months) comes close (≈ 1,151.02 anomalistic months), so eclipses are similar in these groupings.

Series members between 1801 and 2200
| February 21, 1822 (Saros 137) | February 1, 1851 (Saros 138) | January 11, 1880 (Saros 139) |
| December 23, 1908 (Saros 140) | December 2, 1937 (Saros 141) | November 12, 1966 (Saros 142) |
| October 24, 1995 (Saros 143) | October 2, 2024 (Saros 144) | September 12, 2053 (Saros 145) |
| August 24, 2082 (Saros 146) | August 4, 2111 (Saros 147) | July 14, 2140 (Saros 148) |
| June 25, 2169 (Saros 149) | June 4, 2198 (Saros 150) | |
