= Solar eclipse of December 14, 1955 =

20th-century annular solar eclipse

- Annular eclipse
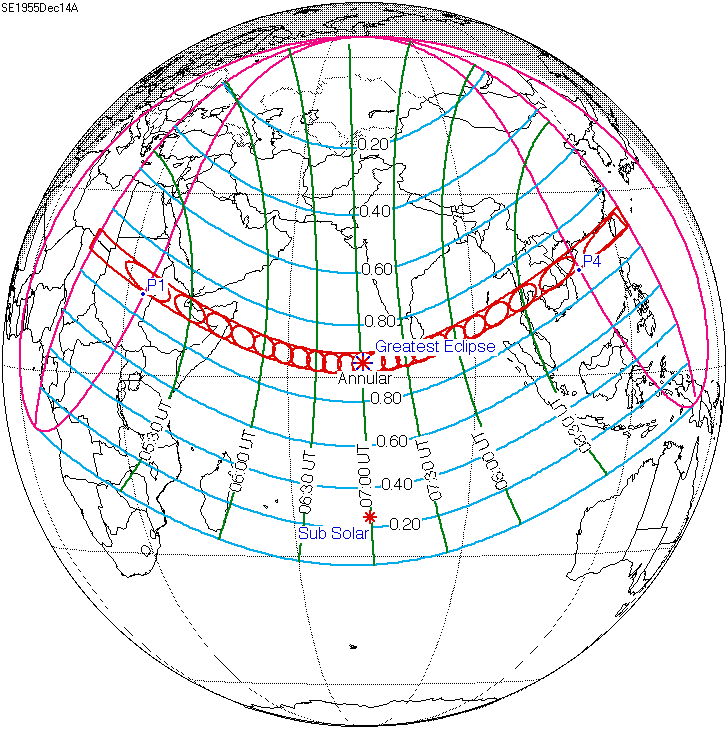
- Map
- Gamma: 0.4266
- Magnitude: 0.9176

Maximum eclipse
- Duration: 729 s (12 min 9 s)
- Coordinates: 2.1°N 72.2°E
- Max. width of band: 346 km (215 mi)

Times (UTC)
- Greatest eclipse: 7:02:25

References
- Saros: 141 (20 of 70)
- Catalog # (SE5000): 9411

An annular solar eclipse occurred at the Moon's ascending node of orbit on Wednesday, December 14, 1955, with a magnitude of 0.9176. A solar eclipse occurs when the Moon passes between Earth and the Sun, thereby totally or partly obscuring the image of the Sun for a viewer on Earth. An annular solar eclipse occurs when the Moon's apparent diameter is smaller than the Sun's, blocking most of the Sun's light and causing the Sun to look like an annulus (ring). An annular eclipse appears as a partial eclipse over a region of the Earth thousands of kilometres wide. Occurring about 1 day before apogee (on December 15, 1955, at 7:10 UTC), the Moon's apparent diameter was smaller.

The duration of annularity at maximum eclipse (closest to but slightly shorter than the longest duration) was 12 minutes, 9.17 seconds in the Indian Ocean. It was the longest annular solar eclipse from December 17, 168 to January 14, 3080. Among all the 23740 solar eclipses from 4000 BC to 6000 AD, 7881 are annular, and only three of them are longer than this one. This was the 20th member of Solar Saros 141, and the last of first set of solar eclipses without a penumbral internal contact (without a penumbra northern limit), the next event is the December 24, 1973 event, which is the first of 19 solar eclipses with a penumbral internal contact (has penumbral northern and southern limits) until 2298 Jul 09.

Annularity was visible from French Equatorial Africa (the part now belonging to Chad), Libya, Anglo-Egyptian Sudan (the part now belonging to Sudan) including the capital city Khartoum, French Somaliland (today's Djibouti) including the capital Djibouti City, British Somaliland (today's Somaliland) including the capital city Hargeisa, the Trust Territory of Somaliland (today's Somalia), the Maldives, Andaman and Nicobar Islands, Burma, Thailand including the capital city Bangkok, Cambodia, Laos, North Vietnam and South Vietnam (now belonging to Vietnam), China, British Hong Kong, Taiwan (including the Pratas Islands), and Ryukyu Islands. A partial eclipse was visible for parts of East Africa and Asia.

This was the third of four central solar eclipses visible from Bangkok from 1948 to 1958, where it is extremely rare for a large city to witness four central solar eclipses within 10 years.

== Extreme duration ==
With a maximum length of annularity duration of 12 minutes and 9.17 seconds, this is the longest solar eclipse in the millennium, as well as the longest duration in Saros 141 and one of the longest eclipses ever observed. The annular path begins in northern Africa, then passing Maldives (near the maximum eclipse), then crosses just southern edge of Sri Lanka, then the track continues to some countries in Indochina and the track ends just slightly after the track passes Taiwan.

== Observation ==
A joint team of the Georgetown University Astronomical Observatory, Washington, D.C. and the United States Air Force observed the annular eclipse in multiple locations around the world. Among them, in Khartoum, capital of Anglo-Egyptian Sudan, the partial phase started before sunrise, and the annular phase was shortly after sunrise. The team measured the refraction with the zenith distance between 80° and 90°.

== Eclipse details ==
Shown below are two tables displaying details about this particular solar eclipse. The first table outlines times at which the Moon's penumbra or umbra attains the specific parameter, and the second table describes various other parameters pertaining to this eclipse.

December 14, 1955 Solar Eclipse Times
Event	Time (UTC)
First Penumbral External Contact	1955 December 14 at 04:01:44.4 UTC
First Umbral External Contact	1955 December 14 at 05:10:54.4 UTC
First Central Line	1955 December 14 at 05:14:41.0 UTC
First Umbral Internal Contact	1955 December 14 at 05:18:29.1 UTC
Greatest Duration	1955 December 14 at 07:01:01.9 UTC
Greatest Eclipse	1955 December 14 at 07:02:25.1 UTC
Equatorial Conjunction	1955 December 14 at 07:04:18.1 UTC
Ecliptic Conjunction	1955 December 14 at 07:07:33.8 UTC
Last Umbral Internal Contact	1955 December 14 at 08:46:19.4 UTC
Last Central Line	1955 December 14 at 08:50:08.2 UTC
Last Umbral External Contact	1955 December 14 at 08:53:55.4 UTC
Last Penumbral External Contact	1955 December 14 at 10:03:06.4 UTC

December 14, 1955 Solar Eclipse Parameters
Parameter	Value
Eclipse Magnitude	0.91764
Eclipse Obscuration	0.84206
Gamma	0.42658
Sun Right Ascension	17h23m01.9s
Sun Declination	-23°10'20.1"
Sun Semi-Diameter	16'14.9"
Sun Equatorial Horizontal Parallax	08.9"
Moon Right Ascension	17h22m58.2s
Moon Declination	-22°47'23.2"
Moon Semi-Diameter	14'42.5"
Moon Equatorial Horizontal Parallax	0°53'59.0"
ΔT	31.3 s

== Eclipse season ==
This eclipse is part of an eclipse season, a period, roughly every six months, when eclipses occur. Only two (or occasionally three) eclipse seasons occur each year, and each season lasts about 35 days and repeats just short of six months (173 days) later; thus two full eclipse seasons always occur each year. Either two or three eclipses happen each eclipse season. In the sequence below, each eclipse is separated by a fortnight.

Eclipse season of November–December 1955
November 29 Descending node (full moon)	December 14 Ascending node (new moon)
Partial lunar eclipse Lunar Saros 115	Annular solar eclipse Solar Saros 141

== Related eclipses ==
=== Eclipses in 1955 ===
- A penumbral lunar eclipse on January 8.
- A penumbral lunar eclipse on June 5.
- A total solar eclipse on June 20.
- A partial lunar eclipse on November 29.
- An annular solar eclipse on December 14.

=== Metonic ===
- Preceded by: Solar eclipse of February 25, 1952
- Followed by: Solar eclipse of October 2, 1959

=== Tzolkinex ===
- Preceded by: Solar eclipse of November 1, 1948
- Followed by: Solar eclipse of January 25, 1963

=== Half-Saros ===
- Preceded by: Lunar eclipse of December 8, 1946
- Followed by: Lunar eclipse of December 19, 1964

=== Tritos ===
- Preceded by: Solar eclipse of January 14, 1945
- Followed by: Solar eclipse of November 12, 1966

=== Solar Saros 141 ===
- Preceded by: Solar eclipse of December 2, 1937
- Followed by: Solar eclipse of December 24, 1973

=== Inex ===
- Preceded by: Solar eclipse of January 3, 1927
- Followed by: Solar eclipse of November 22, 1984

=== Triad ===
- Preceded by: Solar eclipse of February 11, 1869
- Followed by: Solar eclipse of October 14, 2042

=== Solar eclipses of 1953–1956 ===
This eclipse is a member of a semester series. An eclipse in a semester series of solar eclipses repeats approximately every 177 days and 4 hours (a semester) at alternating nodes of the Moon's orbit.

The partial solar eclipses on February 14, 1953 and August 9, 1953 occur in the previous lunar year eclipse set.

Solar eclipse series sets from 1953 to 1956
Descending node			Ascending node		
Saros	Map	Gamma	Saros	Map	Gamma
116	July 11, 1953 Partial	1.4388	121	January 5, 1954 Annular	−0.9296
126	June 30, 1954 Total	0.6135	131	December 25, 1954 Annular	−0.2576
136	June 20, 1955 Total	−0.1528	141	December 14, 1955 Annular	0.4266
146	June 8, 1956 Total	−0.8934	151	December 2, 1956 Partial	1.0923

=== Saros 141 ===
This eclipse is a part of Saros series 141, repeating every 18 years, 11 days, and containing 70 events. The series started with a partial solar eclipse on May 19, 1613. It contains annular eclipses from August 4, 1739 through October 14, 2640. There are no hybrid or total eclipses in this set. The series ends at member 70 as a partial eclipse on June 13, 2857. Its eclipses are tabulated in three columns; every third eclipse in the same column is one exeligmos apart, so they all cast shadows over approximately the same parts of the Earth.

The longest duration of annularity was produced by member 20 at 12 minutes, 9 seconds on December 14, 1955. All eclipses in this series occur at the Moon’s ascending node of orbit.

Series members 12–33 occur between 1801 and 2200:
12	13	14
September 17, 1811	September 28, 1829	October 9, 1847
15	16	17
October 19, 1865	October 30, 1883	November 11, 1901
18	19	20
November 22, 1919	December 2, 1937	December 14, 1955
21	22	23
December 24, 1973	January 4, 1992	January 15, 2010
24	25	26
January 26, 2028	February 5, 2046	February 17, 2064
27	28	29
February 27, 2082	March 10, 2100	March 22, 2118
30	31	32
April 1, 2136	April 12, 2154	April 23, 2172
33
May 4, 2190

=== Metonic series ===
The metonic series repeats eclipses every 19 years (6939.69 days), lasting about 5 cycles. Eclipses occur in nearly the same calendar date. In addition, the octon subseries repeats 1/5 of that or every 3.8 years (1387.94 days). All eclipses in this table occur at the Moon's ascending node.

22 eclipse events between December 13, 1898 and July 20, 1982
December 13–14	October 1–2	July 20–21	May 9	February 24–25
111	113	115	117	119
December 13, 1898		July 21, 1906	May 9, 1910	February 25, 1914
121	123	125	127	129
December 14, 1917	October 1, 1921	July 20, 1925	May 9, 1929	February 24, 1933
131	133	135	137	139
December 13, 1936	October 1, 1940	July 20, 1944	May 9, 1948	February 25, 1952
141	143	145	147	149
December 14, 1955	October 2, 1959	July 20, 1963	May 9, 1967	February 25, 1971
151	153	155		
December 13, 1974	October 2, 1978	July 20, 1982		

=== Tritos series ===
This eclipse is a part of a tritos cycle, repeating at alternating nodes every 135 synodic months (≈ 3986.63 days, or 11 years minus 1 month). Their appearance and longitude are irregular due to a lack of synchronization with the anomalistic month (period of perigee), but groupings of 3 tritos cycles (≈ 33 years minus 3 months) come close (≈ 434.044 anomalistic months), so eclipses are similar in these groupings.

Series members between 1801 and 2200
February 21, 1803 (Saros 127)	January 21, 1814 (Saros 128)	December 20, 1824 (Saros 129)	November 20, 1835 (Saros 130)	October 20, 1846 (Saros 131)
September 18, 1857 (Saros 132)	August 18, 1868 (Saros 133)	July 19, 1879 (Saros 134)	June 17, 1890 (Saros 135)	May 18, 1901 (Saros 136)
April 17, 1912 (Saros 137)	March 17, 1923 (Saros 138)	February 14, 1934 (Saros 139)	January 14, 1945 (Saros 140)	December 14, 1955 (Saros 141)
November 12, 1966 (Saros 142)	October 12, 1977 (Saros 143)	September 11, 1988 (Saros 144)	August 11, 1999 (Saros 145)	July 11, 2010 (Saros 146)
June 10, 2021 (Saros 147)	May 9, 2032 (Saros 148)	April 9, 2043 (Saros 149)	March 9, 2054 (Saros 150)	February 5, 2065 (Saros 151)
January 6, 2076 (Saros 152)	December 6, 2086 (Saros 153)	November 4, 2097 (Saros 154)	October 5, 2108 (Saros 155)	September 5, 2119 (Saros 156)
August 4, 2130 (Saros 157)	July 3, 2141 (Saros 158)	June 3, 2152 (Saros 159)		April 1, 2174 (Saros 161)

=== Inex series ===
This eclipse is a part of the long period inex cycle, repeating at alternating nodes, every 358 synodic months (≈ 10,571.95 days, or 29 years minus 20 days). Their appearance and longitude are irregular due to a lack of synchronization with the anomalistic month (period of perigee). However, groupings of 3 inex cycles (≈ 87 years minus 2 months) comes close (≈ 1,151.02 anomalistic months), so eclipses are similar in these groupings.

Series members between 1801 and 2200
March 24, 1811 (Saros 136)	March 4, 1840 (Saros 137)	February 11, 1869 (Saros 138)
January 22, 1898 (Saros 139)	January 3, 1927 (Saros 140)	December 14, 1955 (Saros 141)
November 22, 1984 (Saros 142)	November 3, 2013 (Saros 143)	October 14, 2042 (Saros 144)
September 23, 2071 (Saros 145)	September 4, 2100 (Saros 146)	August 15, 2129 (Saros 147)
July 25, 2158 (Saros 148)	July 6, 2187 (Saros 149)	
