= Solar eclipse of May 18, 1901 =

Total eclipse

- Total eclipse
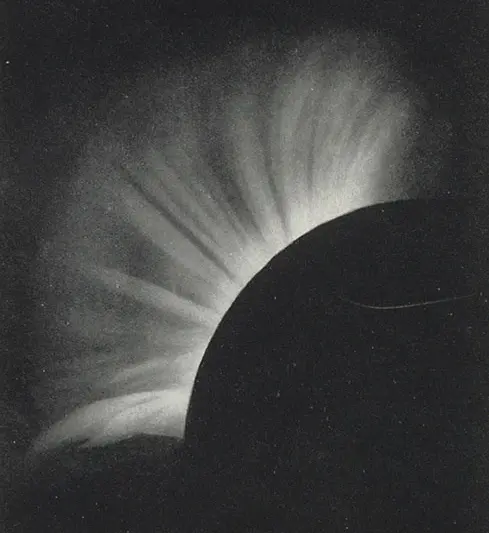
- Totality from Mauritius taken by Annie S. D. Maunder

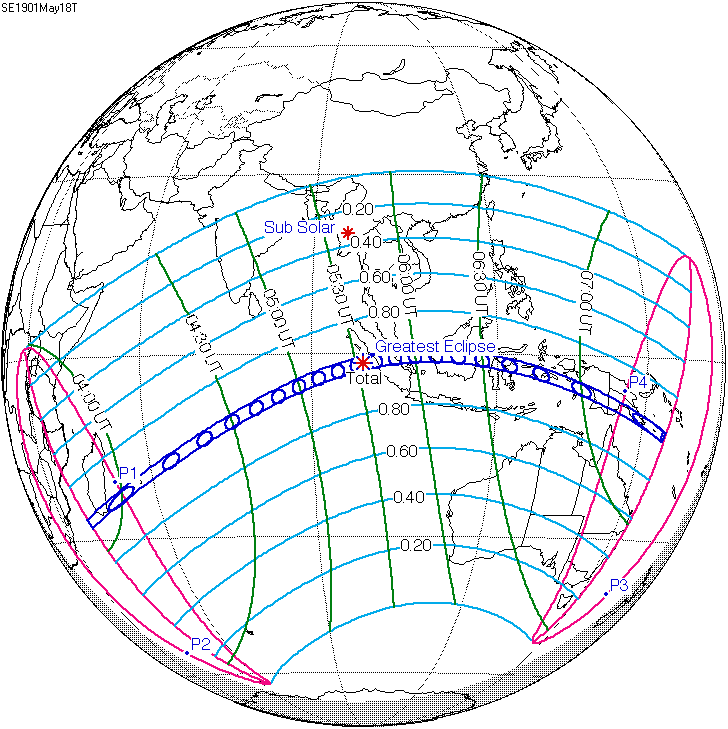
- Map
- Gamma: −0.3626
- Magnitude: 1.068

Maximum eclipse
- Duration: 389 s (6 min 29 s)
- Coordinates: 1.7°S 98.4°E
- Max. width of band: 238 km (148 mi)

Times (UTC)
- Greatest eclipse: 5:33:48

References
- Saros: 136 (31 of 71)
- Catalog # (SE5000): 9283

A total solar eclipse occurred at the Moon's descending node of orbit on Saturday, May 18, 1901, with a magnitude of 1.068. A solar eclipse occurs when the Moon passes between Earth and the Sun, thereby totally or partly obscuring the image of the Sun for a viewer on Earth. A total solar eclipse occurs when the Moon's apparent diameter is larger than the Sun's, blocking all direct sunlight, turning day into darkness. Totality occurs in a narrow path across Earth's surface, with the partial solar eclipse visible over a surrounding region thousands of kilometres wide. Occurring about 23 hours after perigee (on May 17, 1901, at 6:50 UTC), the Moon's apparent diameter was larger.

The path of totality crossed French Madagascar (the part now belonging to Madagascar), Réunion, British Mauritius (now Mauritius), Dutch East Indies (now Indonesia), and British New Guinea (now belonging to Papua New Guinea). A partial eclipse was visible for parts of East Africa, South Asia, Southeast Asia, Australia, and Western Oceania.

== Observations ==
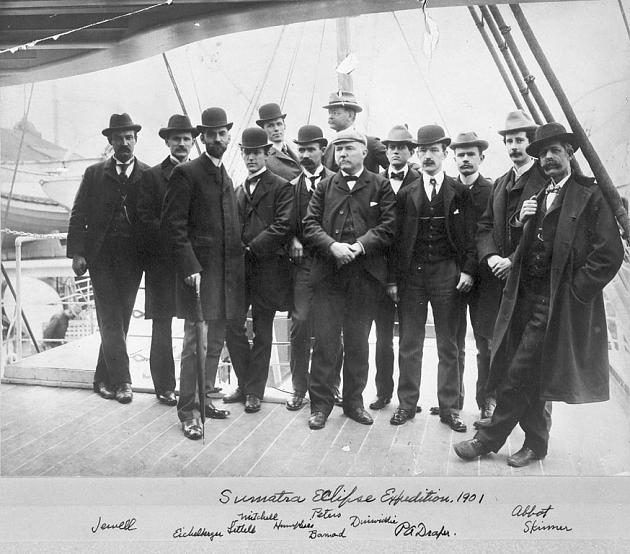
The Sumatra eclipse expedition

The Joint Permanent Eclipse Committee of the Royal Society and Royal Astronomical Society observed the total eclipse in Padang on the west coast of Sumatra, Dutch East Indies. The weather was good after sunrise on May 18, but clouds gradually increased after the start of the eclipse. During the total phase, clouds continued to cover the sun and tended to become thicker, making it increasingly difficult to see the sun through the clouds. A team from Lick Observatory, California also observed it in Padang.

== Eclipse details ==
Shown below are two tables displaying details about this particular solar eclipse. The first table outlines times at which the Moon's penumbra or umbra attains the specific parameter, and the second table describes various other parameters pertaining to this eclipse.

May 18, 1901 Solar Eclipse Times
Event	Time (UTC)
First Penumbral External Contact	1901 May 18 at 02:59:47.9 UTC
First Umbral External Contact	1901 May 18 at 03:56:01.2 UTC
First Central Line	1901 May 18 at 03:57:29.2 UTC
First Umbral Internal Contact	1901 May 18 at 03:58:57.4 UTC
First Penumbral Internal Contact	1901 May 18 at 05:03:42.9 UTC
Equatorial Conjunction	1901 May 18 at 05:28:40.2 UTC
Greatest Eclipse	1901 May 18 at 05:33:48.0 UTC
Greatest Duration	1901 May 18 at 05:35:43.3 UTC
Ecliptic Conjunction	1901 May 18 at 05:37:30.7 UTC
Last Penumbral Internal Contact	1901 May 18 at 06:04:00.5 UTC
Last Umbral Internal Contact	1901 May 18 at 07:08:43.7 UTC
Last Central Line	1901 May 18 at 07:10:10.7 UTC
Last Umbral External Contact	1901 May 18 at 07:11:37.6 UTC
Last Penumbral External Contact	1901 May 18 at 08:07:52.8 UTC

May 18, 1901 Solar Eclipse Parameters
Parameter	Value
Eclipse Magnitude	1.06800
Eclipse Obscuration	1.14063
Gamma	−0.36258
Sun Right Ascension	03h37m03.3s
Sun Declination	+19°23'51.8"
Sun Semi-Diameter	15'48.4"
Sun Equatorial Horizontal Parallax	08.7"
Moon Right Ascension	03h37m15.9s
Moon Declination	+19°02'00.5"
Moon Semi-Diameter	16'37.0"
Moon Equatorial Horizontal Parallax	1°00'58.9"
ΔT	-1.0 s

== Eclipse season ==
This eclipse is part of an eclipse season, a period, roughly every six months, when eclipses occur. Only two (or occasionally three) eclipse seasons occur each year, and each season lasts about 35 days and repeats just short of six months (173 days) later; thus two full eclipse seasons always occur each year. Either two or three eclipses happen each eclipse season. In the sequence below, each eclipse is separated by a fortnight.

Eclipse season of May 1901
May 3 Ascending node (full moon)	May 18 Descending node (new moon)
Penumbral lunar eclipse Lunar Saros 110	Total solar eclipse Solar Saros 136

== Related eclipses ==
=== Eclipses in 1901 ===
- A penumbral lunar eclipse on May 3.
- A total solar eclipse on May 18.
- A partial lunar eclipse on October 27.
- An annular solar eclipse on November 11.

=== Metonic ===
- Preceded by: Solar eclipse of July 29, 1897
- Followed by: Solar eclipse of March 6, 1905

=== Tzolkinex ===
- Preceded by: Solar eclipse of April 6, 1894
- Followed by: Solar eclipse of June 28, 1908

=== Half-Saros ===
- Preceded by: Lunar eclipse of May 11, 1892
- Followed by: Lunar eclipse of May 24, 1910

=== Tritos ===
- Preceded by: Solar eclipse of June 17, 1890
- Followed by: Solar eclipse of April 17, 1912

=== Solar Saros 136 ===
- Preceded by: Solar eclipse of May 6, 1883
- Followed by: Solar eclipse of May 29, 1919

=== Inex ===
- Preceded by: Solar eclipse of June 6, 1872
- Followed by: Solar eclipse of April 28, 1930

=== Triad ===
- Preceded by: Solar eclipse of July 17, 1814
- Followed by: Solar eclipse of March 18, 1988

=== Solar eclipses of 1898–1902 ===
This eclipse is a member of a semester series. An eclipse in a semester series of solar eclipses repeats approximately every 177 days and 4 hours (a semester) at alternating nodes of the Moon's orbit.

The solar eclipses on January 22, 1898 (total) and July 18, 1898 (annular) occur in the previous lunar year eclipse set, and the partial solar eclipse on April 8, 1902 occurs in the next lunar year eclipse set.

Solar eclipse series sets from 1898 to 1902
Ascending node			Descending node		
Saros	Map	Gamma	Saros	Map	Gamma
111	December 13, 1898 Partial	−1.5252	116	June 8, 1899 Partial	1.2089
121	December 3, 1899 Annular	−0.9061	126 Totality in Wadesboro, North Carolina	May 28, 1900 Total	0.3943
131	November 22, 1900 Annular	−0.2245	136	May 18, 1901 Total	−0.3626
141	November 11, 1901 Annular	0.4758	146	May 7, 1902 Partial	−1.0831
151	October 31, 1902 Partial	1.1556			

=== Saros 136 ===
This eclipse is a part of Saros series 136, repeating every 18 years, 11 days, and containing 71 events. The series started with a partial solar eclipse on June 14, 1360. It contains annular eclipses from September 8, 1504 through November 12, 1594; hybrid eclipses from November 22, 1612 through January 17, 1703; and total eclipses from January 27, 1721 through May 13, 2496. The series ends at member 71 as a partial eclipse on July 30, 2622. Its eclipses are tabulated in three columns; every third eclipse in the same column is one exeligmos apart, so they all cast shadows over approximately the same parts of the Earth.

The longest duration of annularity was produced by member 9 at 32 seconds on September 8, 1504, and the longest duration of totality was produced by member 34 at 7 minutes, 7.74 seconds on June 20, 1955. All eclipses in this series occur at the Moon’s descending node of orbit.

Series members 26–47 occur between 1801 and 2200:
26	27	28
March 24, 1811	April 3, 1829	April 15, 1847
29	30	31
April 25, 1865	May 6, 1883	May 18, 1901
32	33	34
May 29, 1919	June 8, 1937	June 20, 1955
35	36	37
June 30, 1973	July 11, 1991	July 22, 2009
38	39	40
August 2, 2027	August 12, 2045	August 24, 2063
41	42	43
September 3, 2081	September 14, 2099	September 26, 2117
44	45	46
October 7, 2135	October 17, 2153	October 29, 2171
47
November 8, 2189

=== Metonic series ===
The metonic series repeats eclipses every 19 years (6939.69 days), lasting about 5 cycles. Eclipses occur in nearly the same calendar date. In addition, the octon subseries repeats 1/5 of that or every 3.8 years (1387.94 days). All eclipses in this table occur at the Moon's descending node.

22 eclipse events between March 5, 1848 and July 30, 1935
March 5–6	December 22–24	October 9–11	July 29–30	May 17–18
108	110	112	114	116
March 5, 1848			July 29, 1859	May 17, 1863
118	120	122	124	126
March 6, 1867	December 22, 1870	October 10, 1874	July 29, 1878	May 17, 1882
128	130	132	134	136
March 5, 1886	December 22, 1889	October 9, 1893	July 29, 1897	May 18, 1901
138	140	142	144	146
March 6, 1905	December 23, 1908	October 10, 1912	July 30, 1916	May 18, 1920
148	150	152	154	
March 5, 1924	December 24, 1927	October 11, 1931	July 30, 1935	

=== Tritos series ===
This eclipse is a part of a tritos cycle, repeating at alternating nodes every 135 synodic months (≈ 3986.63 days, or 11 years minus 1 month). Their appearance and longitude are irregular due to a lack of synchronization with the anomalistic month (period of perigee), but groupings of 3 tritos cycles (≈ 33 years minus 3 months) come close (≈ 434.044 anomalistic months), so eclipses are similar in these groupings.

Series members between 1801 and 2200
February 21, 1803 (Saros 127)	January 21, 1814 (Saros 128)	December 20, 1824 (Saros 129)	November 20, 1835 (Saros 130)	October 20, 1846 (Saros 131)
September 18, 1857 (Saros 132)	August 18, 1868 (Saros 133)	July 19, 1879 (Saros 134)	June 17, 1890 (Saros 135)	May 18, 1901 (Saros 136)
April 17, 1912 (Saros 137)	March 17, 1923 (Saros 138)	February 14, 1934 (Saros 139)	January 14, 1945 (Saros 140)	December 14, 1955 (Saros 141)
November 12, 1966 (Saros 142)	October 12, 1977 (Saros 143)	September 11, 1988 (Saros 144)	August 11, 1999 (Saros 145)	July 11, 2010 (Saros 146)
June 10, 2021 (Saros 147)	May 9, 2032 (Saros 148)	April 9, 2043 (Saros 149)	March 9, 2054 (Saros 150)	February 5, 2065 (Saros 151)
January 6, 2076 (Saros 152)	December 6, 2086 (Saros 153)	November 4, 2097 (Saros 154)	October 5, 2108 (Saros 155)	September 5, 2119 (Saros 156)
August 4, 2130 (Saros 157)	July 3, 2141 (Saros 158)	June 3, 2152 (Saros 159)		April 1, 2174 (Saros 161)

=== Inex series ===
This eclipse is a part of the long period inex cycle, repeating at alternating nodes, every 358 synodic months (≈ 10,571.95 days, or 29 years minus 20 days). Their appearance and longitude are irregular due to a lack of synchronization with the anomalistic month (period of perigee). However, groupings of 3 inex cycles (≈ 87 years minus 2 months) comes close (≈ 1,151.02 anomalistic months), so eclipses are similar in these groupings.

Series members between 1801 and 2200
July 17, 1814 (Saros 133)	June 27, 1843 (Saros 134)	June 6, 1872 (Saros 135)
May 18, 1901 (Saros 136)	April 28, 1930 (Saros 137)	April 8, 1959 (Saros 138)
March 18, 1988 (Saros 139)	February 26, 2017 (Saros 140)	February 5, 2046 (Saros 141)
January 16, 2075 (Saros 142)	December 29, 2103 (Saros 143)	December 7, 2132 (Saros 144)
November 17, 2161 (Saros 145)	October 29, 2190 (Saros 146)	
