= Solar eclipse of November 11, 1901 =

20th-century annular solar eclipse

- Annular eclipse
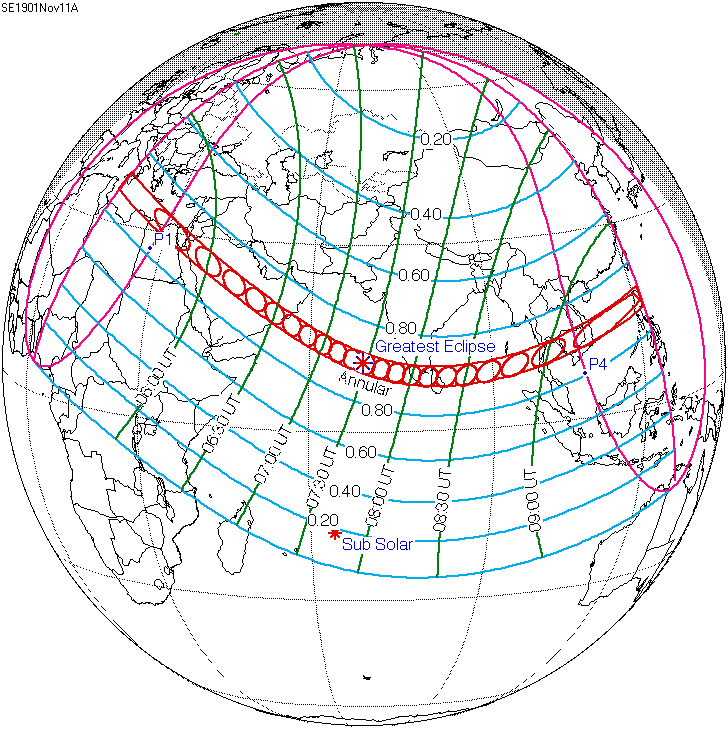
- Map
- Gamma: 0.4758
- Magnitude: 0.9216

Maximum eclipse
- Duration: 661 s (11 min 1 s)
- Coordinates: 10.8°N 68.9°E
- Max. width of band: 336 km (209 mi)

Times (UTC)
- Greatest eclipse: 7:28:21

References
- Saros: 141 (17 of 70)
- Catalog # (SE5000): 9284

An annular solar eclipse occurred at the Moon's ascending node of orbit on Monday, November 11, 1901, with a magnitude of 0.9216. A solar eclipse occurs when the Moon passes between Earth and the Sun, thereby totally or partly obscuring the image of the Sun for a viewer on Earth. An annular solar eclipse occurs when the Moon's apparent diameter is smaller than the Sun's, blocking most of the Sun's light and causing the Sun to look like an annulus (ring). An annular eclipse appears as a partial eclipse over a region of the Earth thousands of kilometres wide. Occurring about 4.5 hours before apogee (on November 11, 1901, at 12:00 UTC), the Moon's apparent diameter was smaller.

Annularity was visible from the Italian island Sicily, the whole British Malta (now Malta), Ottoman Tripolitania (now Libya), Egypt, Ottoman Empire (parts now belonging to Cretan State in Greece, Israel, Jordan and Saudi Arabia), Emirate of Jabal Shammar (now belonging to Saudi Arabia), Aden Protectorate (now belonging to Yemen), Muscat and Oman (now Oman), British Raj (the parts now belonging to India, Andaman and Nicobar Islands and Myanmar), British Ceylon (now Sri Lanka), Siam (name changed to Thailand later), French Indochina (the parts now belonging to Cambodia, southern tip of Laos and southern Vietnam, including Phnom Penh), Bombay Reef in the Paracel Islands, and Philippines. A partial eclipse was visible for parts of North Africa, East Africa, most of Asia, and Northern Australia.

== Eclipse details ==
Shown below are two tables displaying details about this particular solar eclipse. The first table outlines times at which the Moon's penumbra or umbra attains the specific parameter, and the second table describes various other parameters pertaining to this eclipse.

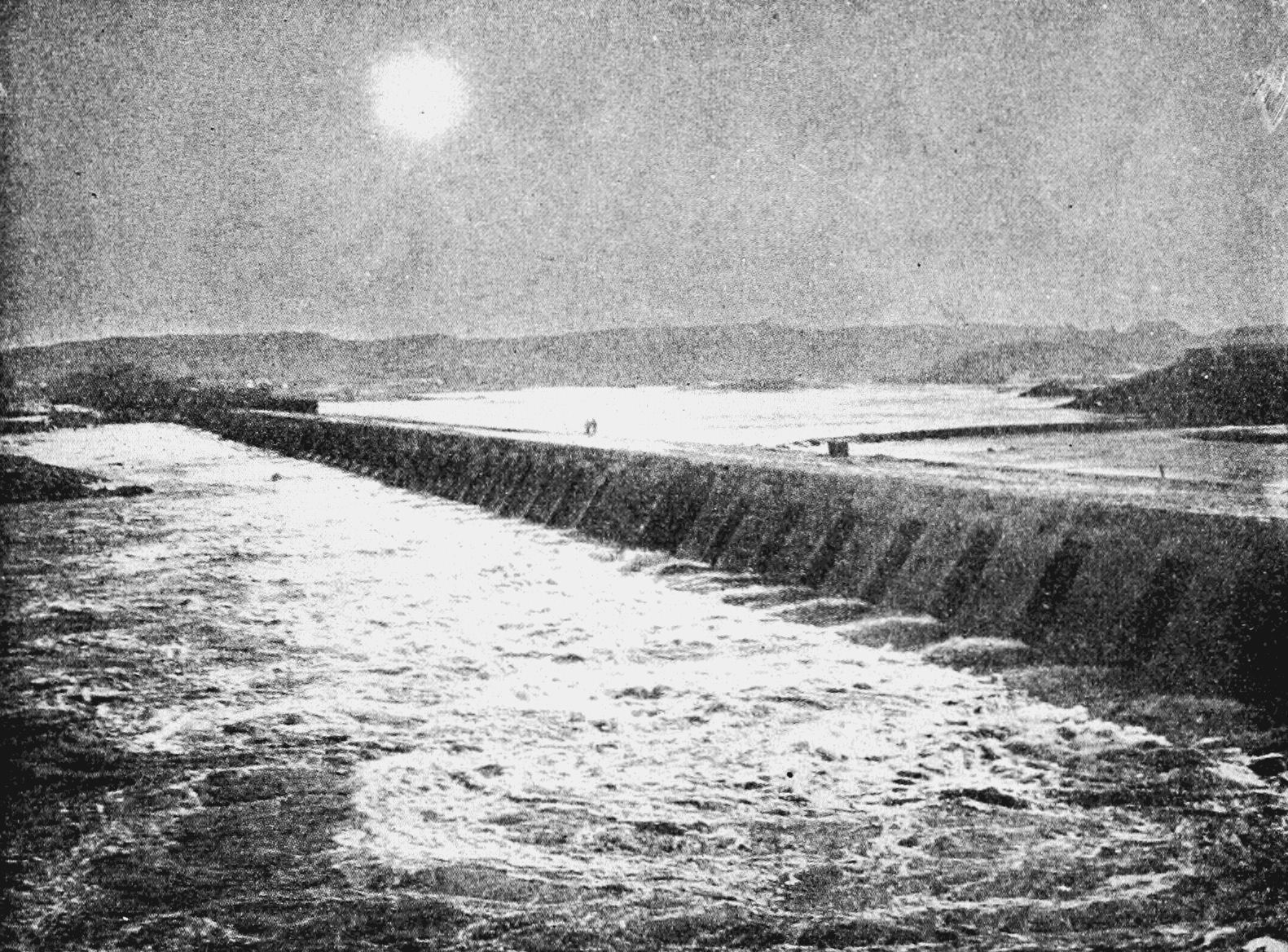
View of the eclipse at Aswan Dam, Egypt

November 11, 1901 Solar Eclipse Times
Event	Time (UTC)
First Penumbral External Contact	1901 November 11 at 04:29:38.4 UTC
First Umbral External Contact	1901 November 11 at 05:39:58.5 UTC
First Central Line	1901 November 11 at 05:43:40.3 UTC
First Umbral Internal Contact	1901 November 11 at 05:47:24.1 UTC
Equatorial Conjunction	1901 November 11 at 07:17:59.6 UTC
Greatest Eclipse	1901 November 11 at 07:28:20.9 UTC
Ecliptic Conjunction	1901 November 11 at 07:34:04.9 UTC
Greatest Duration	1901 November 11 at 07:34:34.5 UTC
Last Umbral Internal Contact	1901 November 11 at 09:09:25.3 UTC
Last Central Line	1901 November 11 at 09:13:09.0 UTC
Last Umbral External Contact	1901 November 11 at 09:16:50.9 UTC
Last Penumbral External Contact	1901 November 11 at 10:27:08.6 UTC

November 11, 1901 Solar Eclipse Parameters
Parameter	Value
Eclipse Magnitude	0.92156
Eclipse Obscuration	0.84926
Gamma	0.47576
Sun Right Ascension	15h03m02.2s
Sun Declination	-17°15'48.8"
Sun Semi-Diameter	16'09.6"
Sun Equatorial Horizontal Parallax	08.9"
Moon Right Ascension	15h03m21.4s
Moon Declination	-16°50'38.2"
Moon Semi-Diameter	14'41.8"
Moon Equatorial Horizontal Parallax	0°53'56.3"
ΔT	-0.3 s

== Eclipse season ==
This eclipse is part of an eclipse season, a period, roughly every six months, when eclipses occur. Only two (or occasionally three) eclipse seasons occur each year, and each season lasts about 35 days and repeats just short of six months (173 days) later; thus two full eclipse seasons always occur each year. Either two or three eclipses happen each eclipse season. In the sequence below, each eclipse is separated by a fortnight.

Eclipse season of October–November 1901
October 27 Descending node (full moon)	November 11 Ascending node (new moon)
Partial lunar eclipse Lunar Saros 115	Annular solar eclipse Solar Saros 141

== Related eclipses ==
=== Eclipses in 1901 ===
- A penumbral lunar eclipse on May 3.
- A total solar eclipse on May 18.
- A partial lunar eclipse on October 27.
- An annular solar eclipse on November 11.

=== Metonic ===
- Preceded by: Solar eclipse of January 22, 1898
- Followed by: Solar eclipse of August 30, 1905

=== Tzolkinex ===
- Preceded by: Solar eclipse of September 29, 1894
- Followed by: Solar eclipse of December 23, 1908

=== Half-Saros ===
- Preceded by: Lunar eclipse of November 4, 1892
- Followed by: Lunar eclipse of November 17, 1910

=== Tritos ===
- Preceded by: Solar eclipse of December 12, 1890
- Followed by: Solar eclipse of October 10, 1912

=== Solar Saros 141 ===
- Preceded by: Solar eclipse of October 30, 1883
- Followed by: Solar eclipse of November 22, 1919

=== Inex ===
- Preceded by: Solar eclipse of November 30, 1872
- Followed by: Solar eclipse of October 21, 1930

=== Triad ===
- Preceded by: Solar eclipse of January 10, 1815
- Followed by: Solar eclipse of September 11, 1988

=== Solar eclipses of 1898–1902 ===
This eclipse is a member of a semester series. An eclipse in a semester series of solar eclipses repeats approximately every 177 days and 4 hours (a semester) at alternating nodes of the Moon's orbit.

The solar eclipses on January 22, 1898 (total) and July 18, 1898 (annular) occur in the previous lunar year eclipse set, and the partial solar eclipse on April 8, 1902 occurs in the next lunar year eclipse set.

Solar eclipse series sets from 1898 to 1902
Ascending node			Descending node		
Saros	Map	Gamma	Saros	Map	Gamma
111	December 13, 1898 Partial	−1.5252	116	June 8, 1899 Partial	1.2089
121	December 3, 1899 Annular	−0.9061	126 Totality in Wadesboro, North Carolina	May 28, 1900 Total	0.3943
131	November 22, 1900 Annular	−0.2245	136	May 18, 1901 Total	−0.3626
141	November 11, 1901 Annular	0.4758	146	May 7, 1902 Partial	−1.0831
151	October 31, 1902 Partial	1.1556			

=== Saros 141 ===
This eclipse is a part of Saros series 141, repeating every 18 years, 11 days, and containing 70 events. The series started with a partial solar eclipse on May 19, 1613. It contains annular eclipses from August 4, 1739 through October 14, 2640. There are no hybrid or total eclipses in this set. The series ends at member 70 as a partial eclipse on June 13, 2857. Its eclipses are tabulated in three columns; every third eclipse in the same column is one exeligmos apart, so they all cast shadows over approximately the same parts of the Earth.

The longest duration of annularity was produced by member 20 at 12 minutes, 9 seconds on December 14, 1955. All eclipses in this series occur at the Moon’s ascending node of orbit.

Series members 12–33 occur between 1801 and 2200:
12	13	14
September 17, 1811	September 28, 1829	October 9, 1847
15	16	17
October 19, 1865	October 30, 1883	November 11, 1901
18	19	20
November 22, 1919	December 2, 1937	December 14, 1955
21	22	23
December 24, 1973	January 4, 1992	January 15, 2010
24	25	26
January 26, 2028	February 5, 2046	February 17, 2064
27	28	29
February 27, 2082	March 10, 2100	March 22, 2118
30	31	32
April 1, 2136	April 12, 2154	April 23, 2172
33
May 4, 2190

=== Metonic series ===
The metonic series repeats eclipses every 19 years (6939.69 days), lasting about 5 cycles. Eclipses occur in nearly the same calendar date. In addition, the octon subseries repeats 1/5 of that or every 3.8 years (1387.94 days). All eclipses in this table occur at the Moon's ascending node.

25 eclipse events between April 5, 1837 and June 17, 1928
April 5–6	January 22–23	November 10–11	August 28–30	June 17–18
107	109	111	113	115
April 5, 1837	January 22, 1841	November 10, 1844	August 28, 1848	June 17, 1852
117	119	121	123	125
April 5, 1856	January 23, 1860	November 11, 1863	August 29, 1867	June 18, 1871
127	129	131	133	135
April 6, 1875	January 22, 1879	November 10, 1882	August 29, 1886	June 17, 1890
137	139	141	143	145
April 6, 1894	January 22, 1898	November 11, 1901	August 30, 1905	June 17, 1909
147	149	151	153	155
April 6, 1913	January 23, 1917	November 10, 1920	August 30, 1924	June 17, 1928

=== Tritos series ===
This eclipse is a part of a tritos cycle, repeating at alternating nodes every 135 synodic months (≈ 3986.63 days, or 11 years minus 1 month). Their appearance and longitude are irregular due to a lack of synchronization with the anomalistic month (period of perigee), but groupings of 3 tritos cycles (≈ 33 years minus 3 months) come close (≈ 434.044 anomalistic months), so eclipses are similar in these groupings.

Series members between 1801 and 2087
August 17, 1803 (Saros 132)	July 17, 1814 (Saros 133)	June 16, 1825 (Saros 134)	May 15, 1836 (Saros 135)	April 15, 1847 (Saros 136)
March 15, 1858 (Saros 137)	February 11, 1869 (Saros 138)	January 11, 1880 (Saros 139)	December 12, 1890 (Saros 140)	November 11, 1901 (Saros 141)
October 10, 1912 (Saros 142)	September 10, 1923 (Saros 143)	August 10, 1934 (Saros 144)	July 9, 1945 (Saros 145)	June 8, 1956 (Saros 146)
May 9, 1967 (Saros 147)	April 7, 1978 (Saros 148)	March 7, 1989 (Saros 149)	February 5, 2000 (Saros 150)	January 4, 2011 (Saros 151)
December 4, 2021 (Saros 152)	November 3, 2032 (Saros 153)	October 3, 2043 (Saros 154)	September 2, 2054 (Saros 155)	August 2, 2065 (Saros 156)
July 1, 2076 (Saros 157)	June 1, 2087 (Saros 158)			

=== Inex series ===
This eclipse is a part of the long period inex cycle, repeating at alternating nodes, every 358 synodic months (≈ 10,571.95 days, or 29 years minus 20 days). Their appearance and longitude are irregular due to a lack of synchronization with the anomalistic month (period of perigee). However, groupings of 3 inex cycles (≈ 87 years minus 2 months) comes close (≈ 1,151.02 anomalistic months), so eclipses are similar in these groupings.

Series members between 1801 and 2200
January 10, 1815 (Saros 138)	December 21, 1843 (Saros 139)	November 30, 1872 (Saros 140)
November 11, 1901 (Saros 141)	October 21, 1930 (Saros 142)	October 2, 1959 (Saros 143)
September 11, 1988 (Saros 144)	August 21, 2017 (Saros 145)	August 2, 2046 (Saros 146)
July 13, 2075 (Saros 147)	June 22, 2104 (Saros 148)	June 3, 2133 (Saros 149)
May 14, 2162 (Saros 150)	April 23, 2191 (Saros 151)	
