= Solar eclipse of January 16, 2075 =

Total eclipse

- Total eclipse
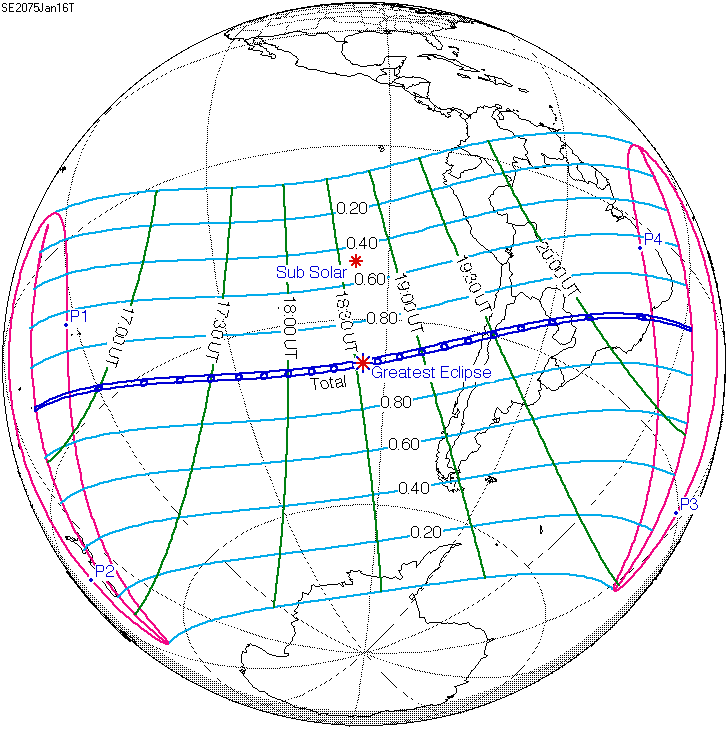
- Map
- Gamma: −0.2799
- Magnitude: 1.0311

Maximum eclipse
- Duration: 162 s (2 min 42 s)
- Coordinates: 37.2°S 94.1°W
- Max. width of band: 110 km (68 mi)

Times (UTC)
- Greatest eclipse: 18:36:04

References
- Saros: 142 (26 of 72)
- Catalog # (SE5000): 9675

A total solar eclipse will occur at the Moon's descending node of orbit on Wednesday, January 16, 2075, with a magnitude of 1.0311. A solar eclipse occurs when the Moon passes between Earth and the Sun, thereby totally or partly obscuring the image of the Sun for a viewer on Earth. A total solar eclipse occurs when the Moon's apparent diameter is larger than the Sun's, blocking all direct sunlight, turning day into darkness. Totality occurs in a narrow path across Earth's surface, with the partial solar eclipse visible over a surrounding region thousands of kilometres wide. Occurring about 1.5 days after perigee (on January 15, 2075, at 7:25 UTC), the Moon's apparent diameter will be larger.

The path of totality will be visible from parts of Chile, Argentina, Paraguay, and Brazil. A partial solar eclipse will also be visible for parts of Oceania, Antarctica, and South America.

== Eclipse details ==
Shown below are two tables displaying details about this particular solar eclipse. The first table outlines times at which the Moon's penumbra or umbra attains the specific parameter, and the second table describes various other parameters pertaining to this eclipse.

January 16, 2075 Solar Eclipse Times
Event	Time (UTC)
First Penumbral External Contact	2075 January 16 at 15:57:25.0 UTC
First Umbral External Contact	2075 January 16 at 16:55:14.7 UTC
First Central Line	2075 January 16 at 16:55:40.1 UTC
First Umbral Internal Contact	2075 January 16 at 16:56:05.5 UTC
First Penumbral Internal Contact	2075 January 16 at 17:58:22.3 UTC
Equatorial Conjunction	2075 January 16 at 18:33:19.8 UTC
Greatest Duration	2075 January 16 at 18:33:39.8 UTC
Greatest Eclipse	2075 January 16 at 18:36:04.3 UTC
Ecliptic Conjunction	2075 January 16 at 18:38:59.2 UTC
Last Penumbral Internal Contact	2075 January 16 at 19:13:49.8 UTC
Last Umbral Internal Contact	2075 January 16 at 20:16:07.2 UTC
Last Central Line	2075 January 16 at 20:16:30.9 UTC
Last Umbral External Contact	2075 January 16 at 20:16:54.6 UTC
Last Penumbral External Contact	2075 January 16 at 21:14:48.6 UTC

January 16, 2075 Solar Eclipse Parameters
Parameter	Value
Eclipse Magnitude	1.03115
Eclipse Obscuration	1.06327
Gamma	−0.27987
Sun Right Ascension	19h55m06.1s
Sun Declination	-20°47'51.3"
Sun Semi-Diameter	16'15.5"
Sun Equatorial Horizontal Parallax	08.9"
Moon Right Ascension	19h55m12.8s
Moon Declination	-21°04'40.9"
Moon Semi-Diameter	16'29.7"
Moon Equatorial Horizontal Parallax	1°00'32.2"
ΔT	101.4 s

== Eclipse season ==
This eclipse is part of an eclipse season, a period, roughly every six months, when eclipses occur. Only two (or occasionally three) eclipse seasons occur each year, and each season lasts about 35 days and repeats just short of six months (173 days) later; thus two full eclipse seasons always occur each year. Either two or three eclipses happen each eclipse season. In the sequence below, each eclipse is separated by a fortnight.

Eclipse season of January 2075
January 2 Ascending node (full moon)	January 16 Descending node (new moon)
Penumbral lunar eclipse Lunar Saros 116	Total solar eclipse Solar Saros 142

== Related eclipses ==
=== Eclipses in 2075 ===
- A penumbral lunar eclipse on January 2.
- A total solar eclipse on January 16.
- A partial lunar eclipse on June 28.
- An annular solar eclipse on July 13.
- A partial lunar eclipse on December 22.

=== Metonic ===
- Preceded by: Solar eclipse of March 31, 2071
- Followed by: Solar eclipse of November 4, 2078

=== Tzolkinex ===
- Preceded by: Solar eclipse of December 6, 2067
- Followed by: Solar eclipse of February 27, 2082

=== Half-Saros ===
- Preceded by: Lunar eclipse of January 11, 2066
- Followed by: Lunar eclipse of January 22, 2084

=== Tritos ===
- Preceded by: Solar eclipse of February 17, 2064
- Followed by: Solar eclipse of December 16, 2085

=== Solar Saros 142 ===
- Preceded by: Solar eclipse of January 5, 2057
- Followed by: Solar eclipse of January 27, 2093

=== Inex ===
- Preceded by: Solar eclipse of February 5, 2046
- Followed by: Solar eclipse of December 29, 2103

=== Triad ===
- Preceded by: Solar eclipse of March 18, 1988
- Followed by: Solar eclipse of November 17, 2161

=== Solar eclipses of 2073–2076 ===
This eclipse is a member of a semester series. An eclipse in a semester series of solar eclipses repeats approximately every 177 days and 4 hours (a semester) at alternating nodes of the Moon's orbit.

The partial solar eclipses on June 1, 2076 and November 26, 2076 occur in the next lunar year eclipse set.

Solar eclipse series sets from 2073 to 2076
Descending node			Ascending node		
Saros	Map	Gamma	Saros	Map	Gamma
122	February 7, 2073 Partial	1.1651	127	August 3, 2073 Total	−0.8763
132	January 27, 2074 Annular	0.4251	137	July 24, 2074 Annular	−0.1242
142	January 16, 2075 Total	−0.2799	147	July 13, 2075 Annular	0.6583
152	January 6, 2076 Total	−0.9373	157	July 1, 2076 Partial	1.4005

=== Saros 142 ===
This eclipse is a part of Saros series 142, repeating every 18 years, 11 days, and containing 72 events. The series started with a partial solar eclipse on April 17, 1624. It contains a hybrid eclipse on July 14, 1768, and total eclipses from July 25, 1786 through October 29, 2543. There are no annular eclipses in this set. The series ends at member 72 as a partial eclipse on June 5, 2904. Its eclipses are tabulated in three columns; every third eclipse in the same column is one exeligmos apart, so they all cast shadows over approximately the same parts of the Earth.

The longest duration of totality will be produced by member 38 at 6 minutes, 34 seconds on May 28, 2291. All eclipses in this series occur at the Moon’s descending node of orbit.

Series members 11–32 occur between 1801 and 2200:
11	12	13
August 5, 1804	August 16, 1822	August 27, 1840
14	15	16
September 7, 1858	September 17, 1876	September 29, 1894
17	18	19
October 10, 1912	October 21, 1930	November 1, 1948
20	21	22
November 12, 1966	November 22, 1984	December 4, 2002
23	24	25
December 14, 2020	December 26, 2038	January 5, 2057
26	27	28
January 16, 2075	January 27, 2093	February 8, 2111
29	30	31
February 18, 2129	March 2, 2147	March 12, 2165
32
March 23, 2183

=== Metonic series ===
The metonic series repeats eclipses every 19 years (6939.69 days), lasting about 5 cycles. Eclipses occur in nearly the same calendar date. In addition, the octon subseries repeats 1/5 of that or every 3.8 years (1387.94 days). All eclipses in this table occur at the Moon's descending node.

22 eclipse events between June 12, 2029 and November 4, 2116
June 11–12	March 30–31	January 16	November 4–5	August 23–24
118	120	122	124	126
June 12, 2029	March 30, 2033	January 16, 2037	November 4, 2040	August 23, 2044
128	130	132	134	136
June 11, 2048	March 30, 2052	January 16, 2056	November 5, 2059	August 24, 2063
138	140	142	144	146
June 11, 2067	March 31, 2071	January 16, 2075	November 4, 2078	August 24, 2082
148	150	152	154	156
June 11, 2086	March 31, 2090	January 16, 2094	November 4, 2097	August 24, 2101
158	160	162	164	
June 12, 2105			November 4, 2116	

=== Tritos series ===
This eclipse is a part of a tritos cycle, repeating at alternating nodes every 135 synodic months (≈ 3986.63 days, or 11 years minus 1 month). Their appearance and longitude are irregular due to a lack of synchronization with the anomalistic month (period of perigee), but groupings of 3 tritos cycles (≈ 33 years minus 3 months) come close (≈ 434.044 anomalistic months), so eclipses are similar in these groupings.

Series members between 1801 and 2200
March 4, 1802 (Saros 117)	February 1, 1813 (Saros 118)	January 1, 1824 (Saros 119)	November 30, 1834 (Saros 120)	October 30, 1845 (Saros 121)
September 29, 1856 (Saros 122)	August 29, 1867 (Saros 123)	July 29, 1878 (Saros 124)	June 28, 1889 (Saros 125)	May 28, 1900 (Saros 126)
April 28, 1911 (Saros 127)	March 28, 1922 (Saros 128)	February 24, 1933 (Saros 129)	January 25, 1944 (Saros 130)	December 25, 1954 (Saros 131)
November 23, 1965 (Saros 132)	October 23, 1976 (Saros 133)	September 23, 1987 (Saros 134)	August 22, 1998 (Saros 135)	July 22, 2009 (Saros 136)
June 21, 2020 (Saros 137)	May 21, 2031 (Saros 138)	April 20, 2042 (Saros 139)	March 20, 2053 (Saros 140)	February 17, 2064 (Saros 141)
January 16, 2075 (Saros 142)	December 16, 2085 (Saros 143)	November 15, 2096 (Saros 144)	October 16, 2107 (Saros 145)	September 15, 2118 (Saros 146)
August 15, 2129 (Saros 147)	July 14, 2140 (Saros 148)	June 14, 2151 (Saros 149)	May 14, 2162 (Saros 150)	April 12, 2173 (Saros 151)
March 12, 2184 (Saros 152)	February 10, 2195 (Saros 153)			

=== Inex series ===
This eclipse is a part of the long period inex cycle, repeating at alternating nodes, every 358 synodic months (≈ 10,571.95 days, or 29 years minus 20 days). Their appearance and longitude are irregular due to a lack of synchronization with the anomalistic month (period of perigee). However, groupings of 3 inex cycles (≈ 87 years minus 2 months) comes close (≈ 1,151.02 anomalistic months), so eclipses are similar in these groupings.

Series members between 1801 and 2200
July 17, 1814 (Saros 133)	June 27, 1843 (Saros 134)	June 6, 1872 (Saros 135)
May 18, 1901 (Saros 136)	April 28, 1930 (Saros 137)	April 8, 1959 (Saros 138)
March 18, 1988 (Saros 139)	February 26, 2017 (Saros 140)	February 5, 2046 (Saros 141)
January 16, 2075 (Saros 142)	December 29, 2103 (Saros 143)	December 7, 2132 (Saros 144)
November 17, 2161 (Saros 145)	October 29, 2190 (Saros 146)	
