= Thomas Smillie =

British-American photographer and archivist

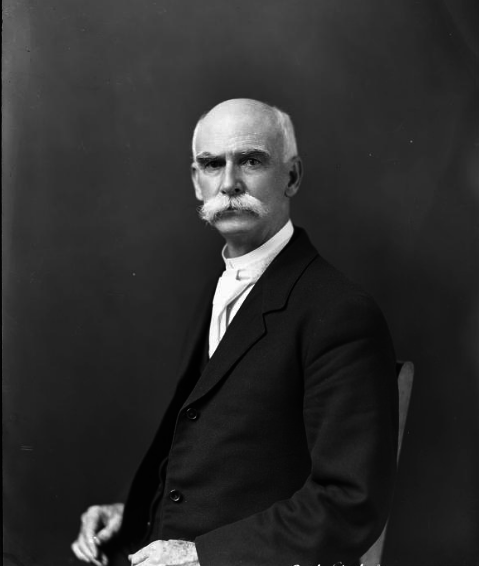
- Born: Thomas William Smillie; April 15, 1843; Edinburgh, Scotland, United Kingdom
- Died: March 7, 1917 (aged 73)
- Known for: Photography

Thomas William Smillie (April 15, 1843 – March 7, 1917) was a British-American photographer and archivist. He served as the first official photographer of the Smithsonian Institution, as well as the first official curator of the Smithsonian's photography collection.

== Early life ==
Smillie was born in Edinburgh, but moved to the United States with his family at age five. He eventually attended Georgetown University as a student in medicine and chemistry.

== Career ==
At the age of 27, Smillie started for the Smithsonian as a staff photographer using different photographic techniques to document the Smithsonian's daily operation, its exhibitions and people. In 1890, Louisa Bernie Gallaher was transferred to his photographic department after Smillie had noticed her photography skills. Gallaher became his chief assistant.

Smillie gained field experience as an expedition photographer for the United States Fish Commission and he photographed the Solar eclipse of May 28, 1900. Additionally, upon the creation of the formal Section of Photography at the Smithsonian in 1896, Smillie was appointed a Smithsonian Custodian in charge of the growing photographic collection; he would hold both positions until his death in 1917.

One of Smillie's interests was in preserving the history of photography. After assuming his curatorial duties, he decided that, "an effort will be made hereafter, especially in connection with the future expositions of amateur photography, to secure such works as are necessary to make the collection in the National Museum a reference and record collection, which shall not only be a matter of interest and pleasure to the public, but of practical value to the photographers themselves." His initial purchases for the Section of Photography included a camera and equipment owned by Samuel Morse.

In 1913, Smillie curated the Smithsonian's first-ever photography exhibition.

Frances Benjamin Johnston learned photography from him, among others.

== Example works ==
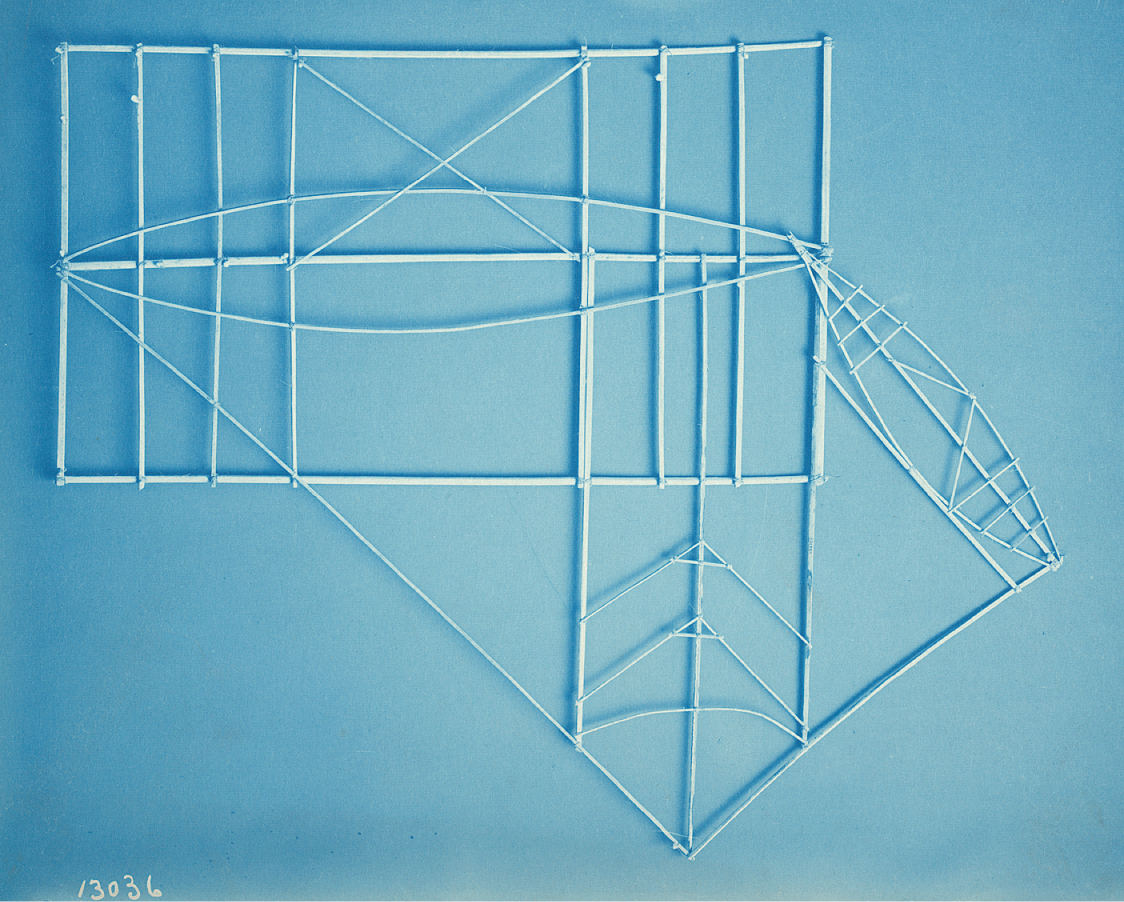
Marshall Islands Navigation Map

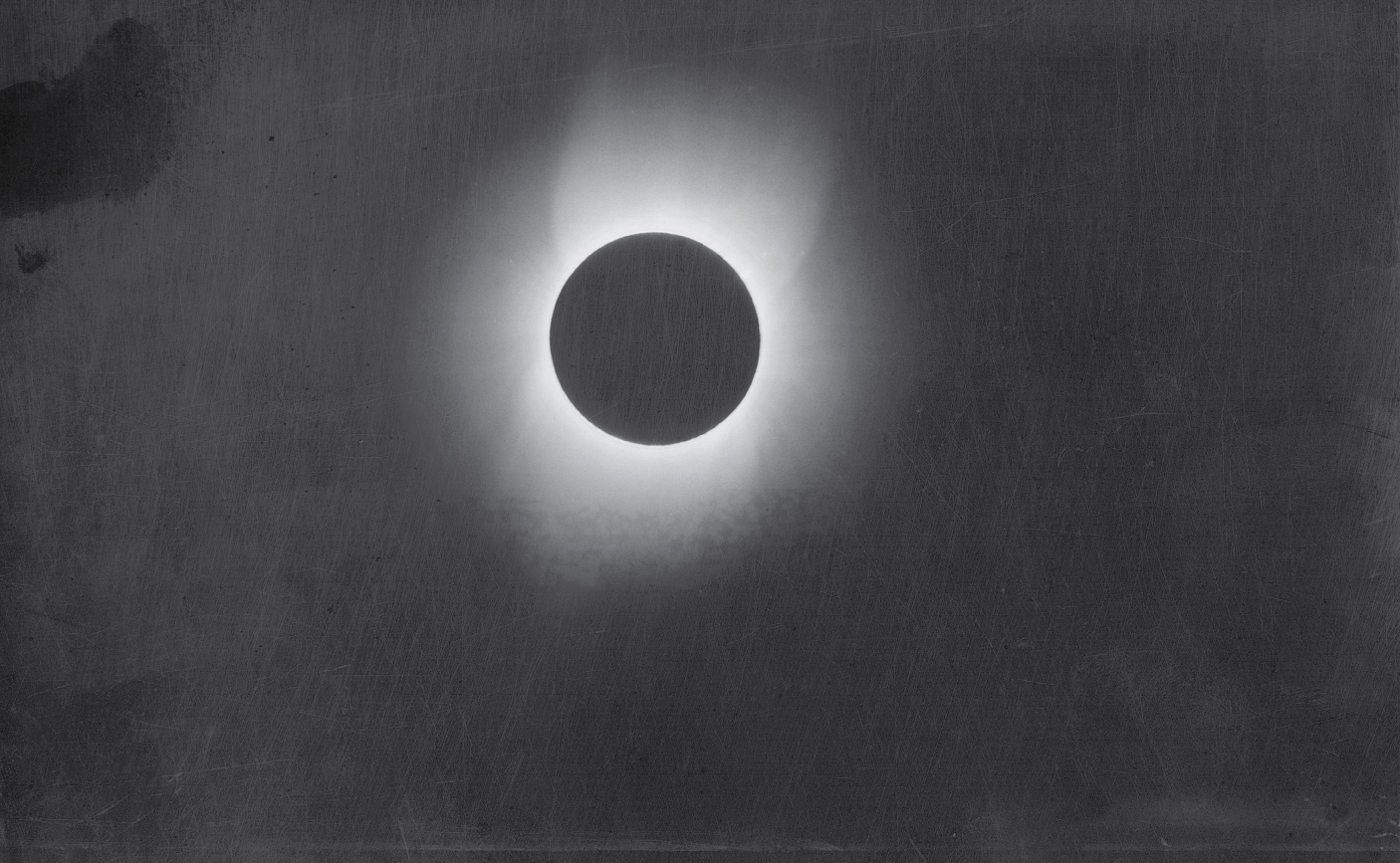
Corona of the Sun during a Solar Eclipse

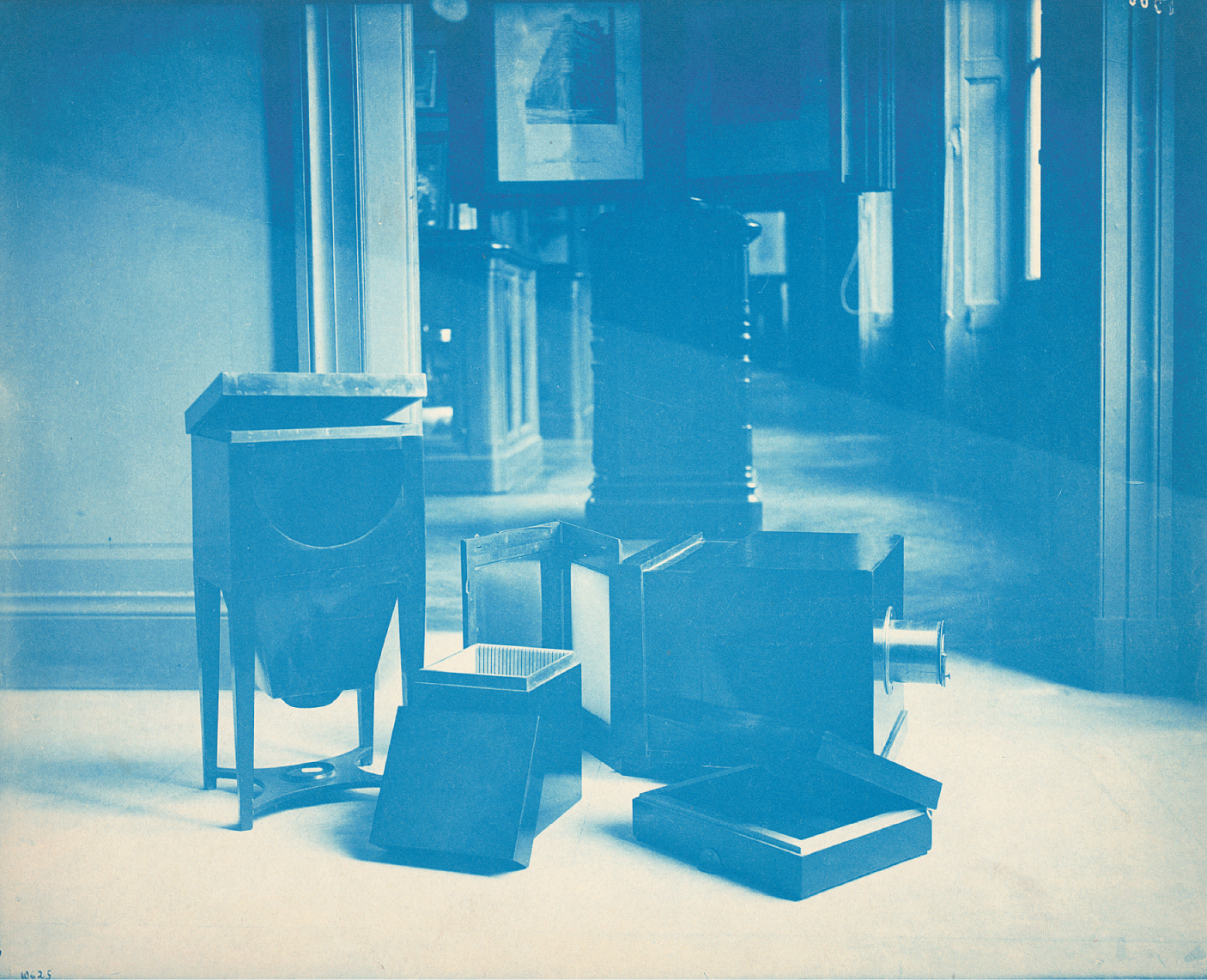
Samuel F. B. Morse's Daguerreotype Equipment

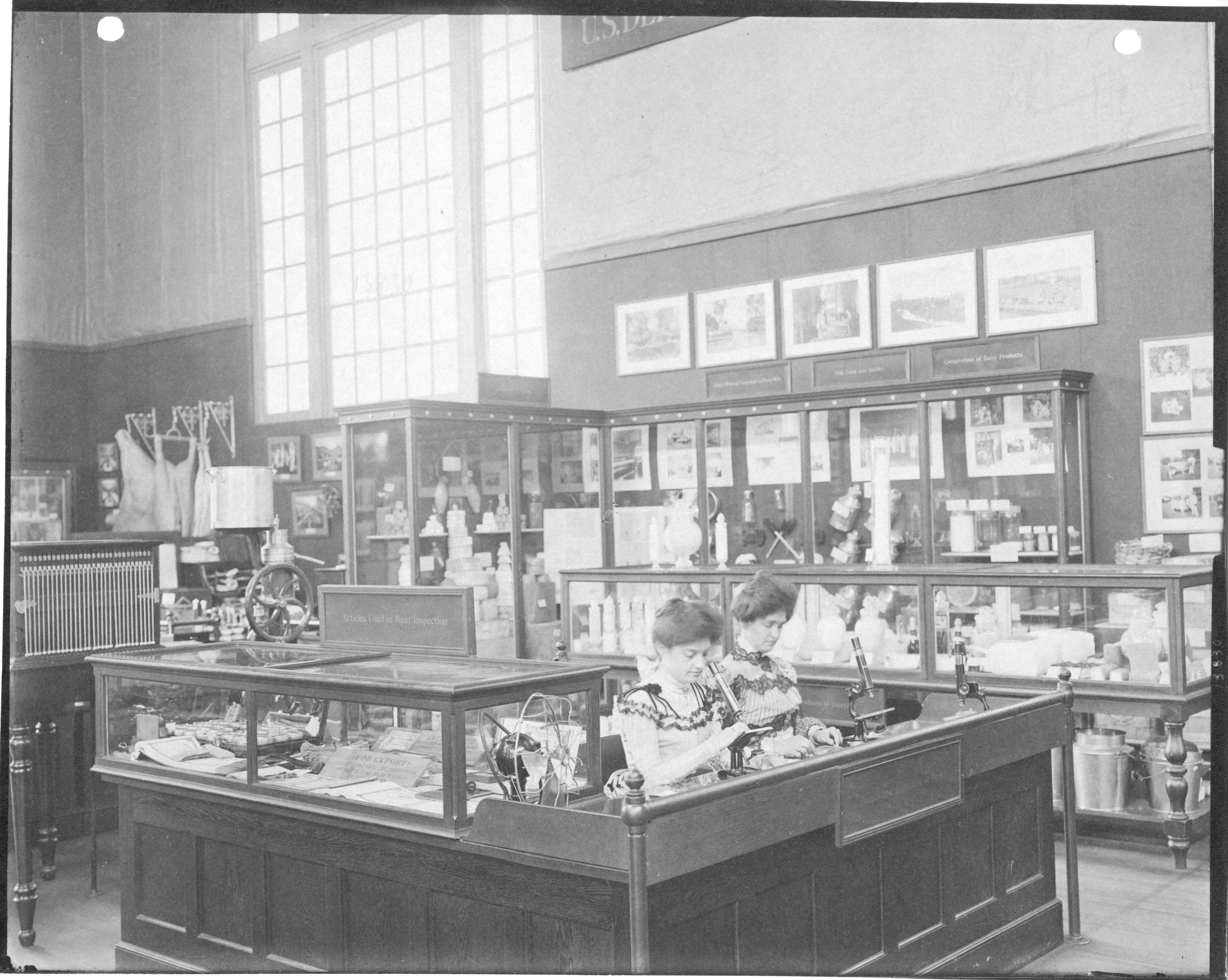
Pan-American Exposition, Department of Agriculture display, food and drug inspections

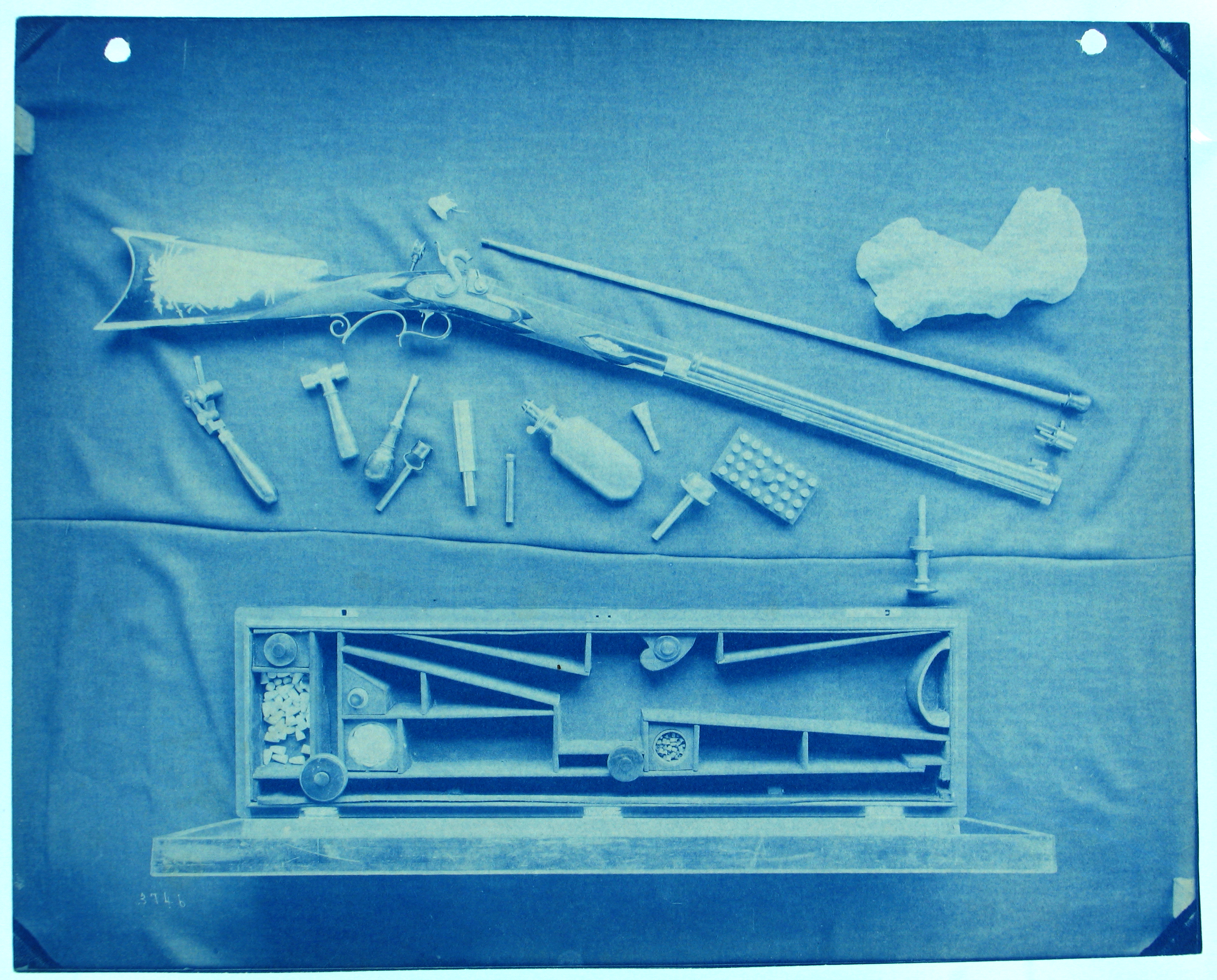
Item in the Smithsonian collection

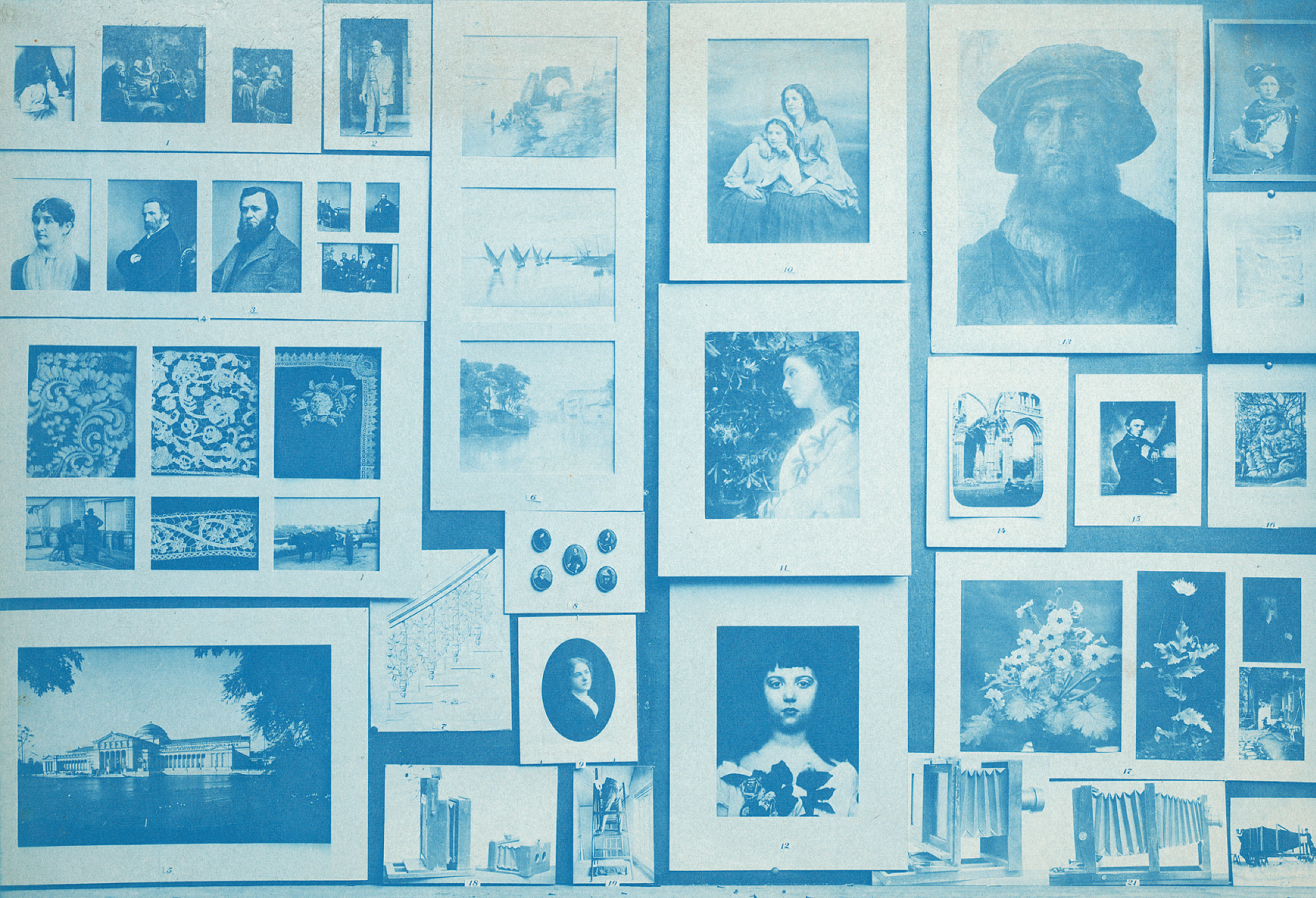
Smithsonian Photography Exhibition
