= Louisa Bernie Gallaher =

American scientific photographer for the Smithsonian

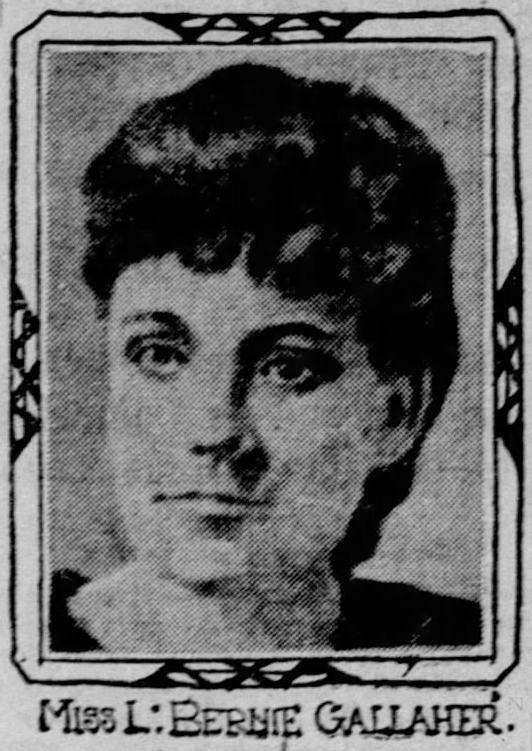
- Gallaher c. 1905
- Born: 1857/1858; Washington, D. C., U.S.
- Died: April 18, 1917 (aged 59); Washington, D. C., U.S.
- Occupation: Photographer

Louisa Bernie Gallaher, also known as L. Bernie Gallaher (born 1857/1858 - April 18, 1917), was an American scientific photographer for the Smithsonian United States National Museum (USNM). She was the Smithsonian's first woman photographer and worked at the institution for 39 years, from 1878 until her death in 1917.

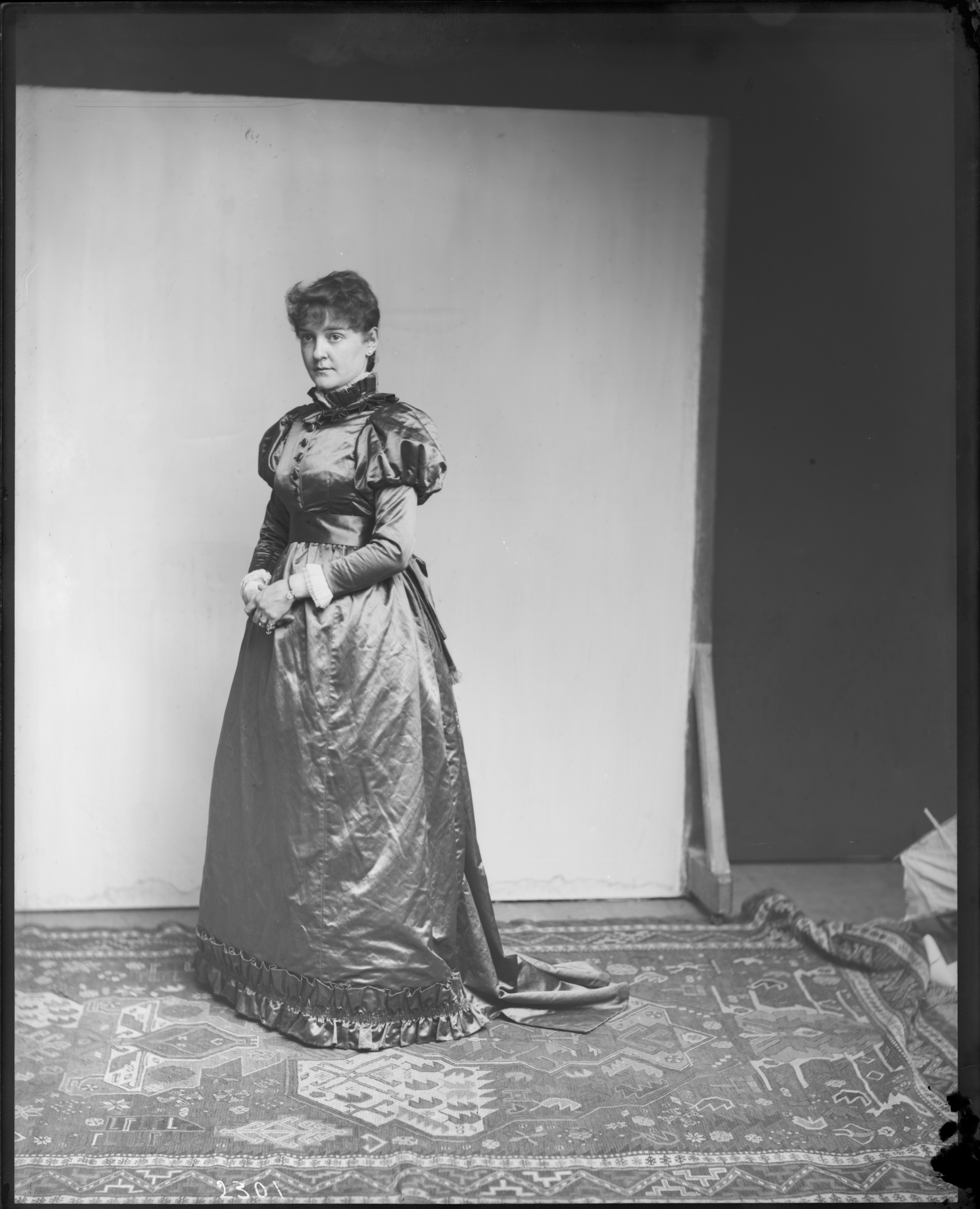
A woman presumed to be Gallaher models a dress from the USNM collections.

== Life and career ==
Gallaher was born in Washington, D.C., in 1857 or 1858, to Eliza A. Gallaher and B. Frank Gallaher. At the age of 20, Louisa Gallaher began her work at the Smithsonian as a clerk, and later began teaching herself photography during her time in the museum's mammalian department. By 1890, she was transferred to the institution's photographic department, where she became the chief assistant to Smithsonian's first photographer, Thomas Smillie, who took notice to her developing photography skills prior to the transfer. She was tasked with the photography of people and museum displays, such as paintings, engravings, and sculptures. Additionally, she specialized in photomicrography, and created X-ray reproductions. Occasionally, she could be seen working outside, where she shot photographs of animals.

As part of her work at the museum, she developed various photos, creating platinum prints and processing others' photographs that were sent to the museum. Furthermore, she created lantern slides, which were used in lectures across the United States and Europe.

Gallaher continued to work in the museum's photographic department until her death on April 18, 1917, in Washington, D.C., at the age of 59. Prior to her death, much of her work was falsely credited to her boss, Thomas Smillie. By 2019, Smithsonian archivists had begun correcting Gallaher's missing credits.
