= Solar eclipse of May 28, 1900 =

Total eclipse

- Total eclipse
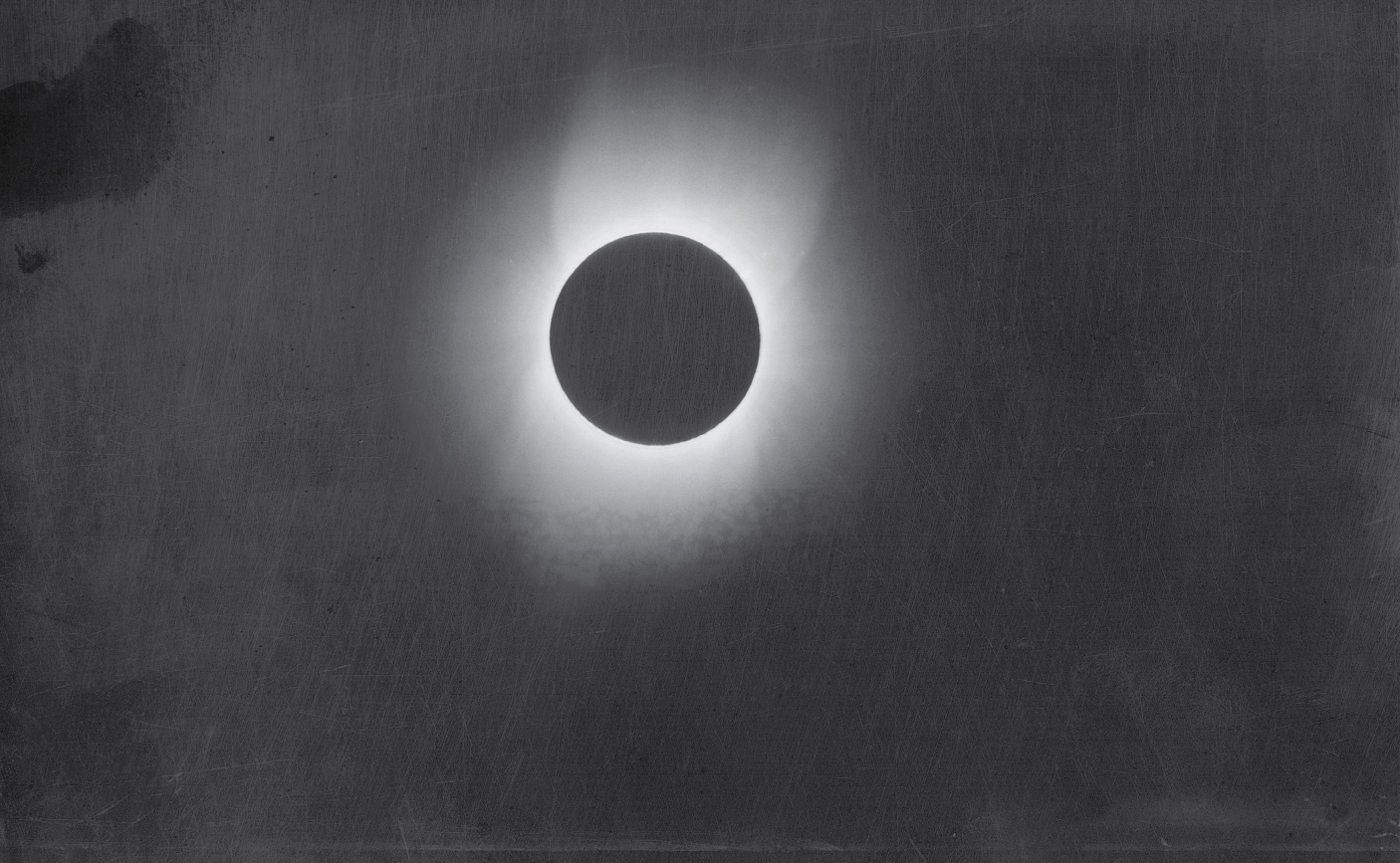
- Totality photographed in Wadesboro, North Carolina, by Thomas Smillie for the Smithsonian Solar Eclipse Expedition to capture photographic proof of the solar corona

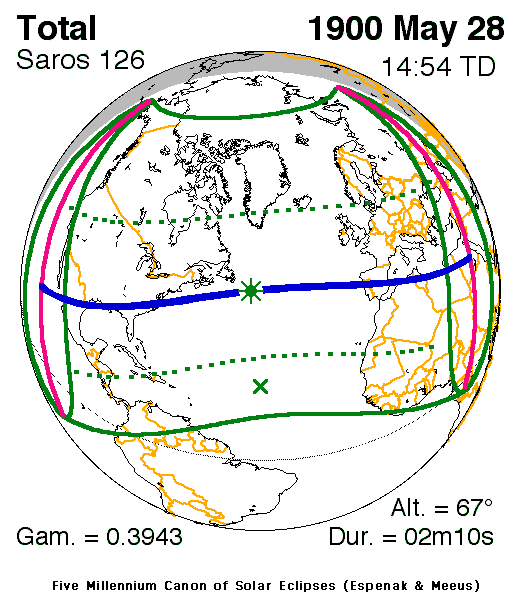
- Map
- Gamma: 0.3943
- Magnitude: 1.0249

Maximum eclipse
- Duration: 130 s (2 min 10 s)
- Coordinates: 44.8°N 46.5°W
- Max. width of band: 92 km (57 mi)

Times (UTC)
- Greatest eclipse: 14:53:56

References
- Saros: 126 (41 of 72)
- Catalog # (SE5000): 9281

A total solar eclipse occurred at the Moon's descending node of orbit on Monday, May 28, 1900, with a magnitude of 1.0249. A solar eclipse occurs when the Moon passes between Earth and the Sun, thereby totally or partly obscuring the image of the Sun for a viewer on Earth. A total solar eclipse occurs when the Moon's apparent diameter is larger than the Sun's, blocking all direct sunlight, turning day into darkness. Totality occurs in a narrow path across Earth's surface, with the partial solar eclipse visible over a surrounding region thousands of kilometres wide. Occurring about 3.9 days after perigee (on May 24, 1900, at 17:30 UTC), the Moon's apparent diameter was larger.

The path of totality was visible from parts of Mexico, the states of Texas, Louisiana, Mississippi, Alabama, Georgia, South Carolina, North Carolina, and Virginia in the United States, Portugal, Spain, Algeria, Tripoli, and Egypt. A partial solar eclipse was also visible for parts of North America, Central America, the Caribbean, northern South America, Europe, West Africa, and North Africa.

== Viewing ==
In 1900 the Smithsonian Astrophysical Observatory, then based in Washington, D.C., loaded several railroad cars with scientific equipment and headed to Wadesboro, North Carolina. Scientists had determined that this small town would be the best location in North America for viewing the total solar eclipse, and the Smithsonian Solar Eclipse Expedition hoped to capture photographic images of the solar corona during the event for further study. The team included Thomas Smillie, the mission's photographer. Smillie rigged cameras to seven telescopes and successfully made eight glass-plate negatives, ranging in size from eleven by fourteen inches to thirty by thirty inches. Smillie's work was considered an amazing photographic and scientific achievement.

In addition to the team from the Smithsonian:

[s]cientific expeditions were mounted from some of the world’s preeminent astronomy programs including Princeton University, the University of Chicago, . . . and the British Astronomical Association. S. P. Langley and C. A. Young, two of the founders of modern astronomy, were also there.

According to Wadesboro's newspaper, the Anson Independent, the public came out in droves. Extra trains—including a special excursion train from Charlotte—brought out hundreds of people, and by the time the eclipse’s effects were beginning to be seen around 7:30 a.m., the streets were packed, and people were vying for better spots from rooftops and windows..

The same local newspaper described the total eclipse itself as lasting for less than a minute and a half, and recorded that though a large crowd was on hand, it was nearly silent during that entire time. The paper also mentioned that the drop in temperature from the shadow caused by the eclipse was quite significant.

The eclipse was filmed by Nevil Maskelyne in North Carolina. It was also observed from Mahelma in Algeria by John Evershed.

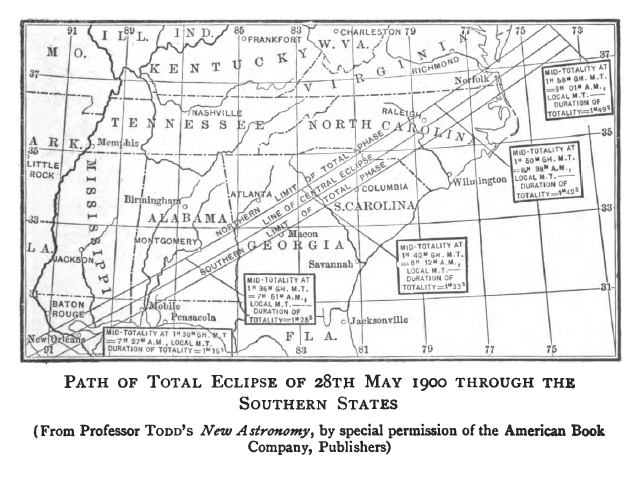
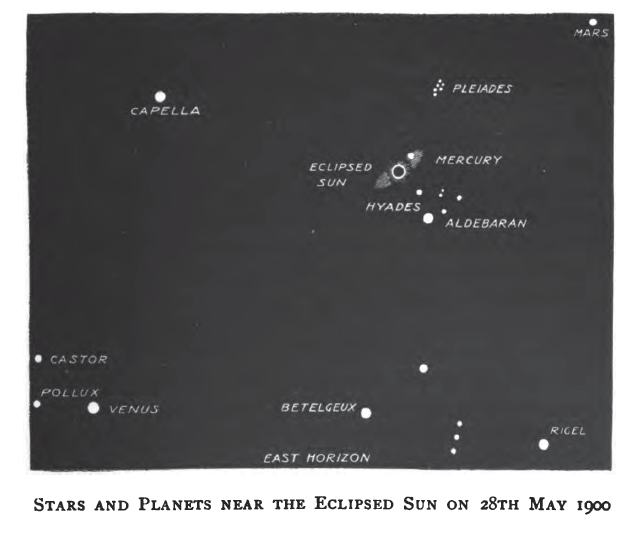
| A map from 1900 | The stars during total eclipse | Recording of the eclipse |

== Eclipse details ==
Shown below are two tables displaying details about this particular solar eclipse. The first table outlines times at which the Moon's penumbra or umbra attains the specific parameter, and the second table describes various other parameters pertaining to this eclipse.

May 28, 1900 Solar Eclipse Times
| Event | Time (UTC) |
|---|---|
| First Penumbral External Contact | 1900 May 28 at 12:12:21.6 UTC |
| First Umbral External Contact | 1900 May 28 at 13:14:08.2 UTC |
| First Central Line | 1900 May 28 at 13:14:27.0 UTC |
| First Umbral Internal Contact | 1900 May 28 at 13:14:45.8 UTC |
| First Penumbral Internal Contact | 1900 May 28 at 14:29:28.7 UTC |
| Ecliptic Conjunction | 1900 May 28 at 14:49:42.6 UTC |
| Greatest Duration | 1900 May 28 at 14:52:29.6 UTC |
| Greatest Eclipse | 1900 May 28 at 14:53:55.5 UTC |
| Equatorial Conjunction | 1900 May 28 at 14:56:57.5 UTC |
| Last Penumbral Internal Contact | 1900 May 28 at 15:18:16.5 UTC |
| Last Umbral Internal Contact | 1900 May 28 at 16:33:06.4 UTC |
| Last Central Line | 1900 May 28 at 16:33:22.5 UTC |
| Last Umbral External Contact | 1900 May 28 at 16:33:38.7 UTC |
| Last Penumbral External Contact | 1900 May 28 at 17:35:33.8 UTC |

May 28, 1900 Solar Eclipse Parameters
| Parameter | Value |
|---|---|
| Eclipse Magnitude | 1.02494 |
| Eclipse Obscuration | 1.05051 |
| Gamma | 0.39427 |
| Sun Right Ascension | 04h19m46.8s |
| Sun Declination | +21°27'14.4" |
| Sun Semi-Diameter | 15'46.6" |
| Sun Equatorial Horizontal Parallax | 08.7" |
| Moon Right Ascension | 04h19m39.8s |
| Moon Declination | +21°50'10.6" |
| Moon Semi-Diameter | 15'55.8" |
| Moon Equatorial Horizontal Parallax | 0°58'27.9" |
| ΔT | -2.2 s |

== Eclipse season ==
This eclipse is part of an eclipse season, a period, roughly every six months, when eclipses occur. Only two (or occasionally three) eclipse seasons occur each year, and each season lasts about 35 days and repeats just short of six months (173 days) later; thus two full eclipse seasons always occur each year. Either two or three eclipses happen each eclipse season. In the sequence below, each eclipse is separated by a fortnight.

Eclipse season of May–June 1900
| May 28 Descending node (new moon) | June 13 Ascending node (full moon) |
|---|---|
| Total solar eclipse Solar Saros 126 | Penumbral lunar eclipse Lunar Saros 138 |

== Related eclipses ==
=== Eclipses in 1900 ===
- A total solar eclipse on May 28.
- A penumbral lunar eclipse on June 13.
- An annular solar eclipse on November 22.
- A penumbral lunar eclipse on December 6.

=== Metonic ===
- Preceded by: Solar eclipse of August 9, 1896
- Followed by: Solar eclipse of March 17, 1904

=== Tzolkinex ===
- Preceded by: Solar eclipse of April 16, 1893
- Followed by: Solar eclipse of July 10, 1907

=== Half-Saros ===
- Preceded by: Lunar eclipse of May 23, 1891
- Followed by: Lunar eclipse of June 4, 1909

=== Tritos ===
- Preceded by: Solar eclipse of June 28, 1889
- Followed by: Solar eclipse of April 28, 1911

=== Solar Saros 126 ===
- Preceded by: Solar eclipse of May 17, 1882
- Followed by: Solar eclipse of June 8, 1918

=== Inex ===
- Preceded by: Solar eclipse of June 18, 1871
- Followed by: Solar eclipse of May 9, 1929

=== Triad ===
- Preceded by: Solar eclipse of July 27, 1813
- Followed by: Solar eclipse of March 29, 1987

=== Solar eclipses of 1898–1902 ===
This eclipse is a member of a semester series. An eclipse in a semester series of solar eclipses repeats approximately every 177 days and 4 hours (a semester) at alternating nodes of the Moon's orbit.

The solar eclipses on January 22, 1898 (total) and July 18, 1898 (annular) occur in the previous lunar year eclipse set, and the partial solar eclipse on April 8, 1902 occurs in the next lunar year eclipse set.

Solar eclipse series sets from 1898 to 1902
| Ascending node | | | Descending node | | |
| Saros | Map | Gamma | Saros | Map | Gamma |
| 111 | December 13, 1898 Partial | −1.5252 | 116 | June 8, 1899 Partial | 1.2089 |
| 121 | December 3, 1899 Annular | −0.9061 | 126 Totality in Wadesboro, North Carolina | May 28, 1900 Total | 0.3943 |
| 131 | November 22, 1900 Annular | −0.2245 | 136 | May 18, 1901 Total | −0.3626 |
| 141 | November 11, 1901 Annular | 0.4758 | 146 | May 7, 1902 Partial | −1.0831 |
| 151 | October 31, 1902 Partial | 1.1556 | | | |

=== Saros 126 ===
This eclipse is a part of Saros series 126, repeating every 18 years, 11 days, and containing 72 events. The series started with a partial solar eclipse on March 10, 1179. It contains annular eclipses from June 4, 1323 through April 4, 1810; hybrid eclipses from April 14, 1828 through May 6, 1864; and total eclipses from May 17, 1882 through August 23, 2044. The series ends at member 72 as a partial eclipse on May 3, 2459. Its eclipses are tabulated in three columns; every third eclipse in the same column is one exeligmos apart, so they all cast shadows over approximately the same parts of the Earth.

The longest duration of annularity was produced by member 11 at 6 minutes, 30 seconds on June 26, 1359, and the longest duration of totality was produced by member 45 at 2 minutes, 36 seconds on July 10, 1972. All eclipses in this series occur at the Moon’s descending node of orbit.

Series members 36–57 occur between 1801 and 2200:
| 36 | 37 | 38 |
|---|---|---|
| April 4, 1810 | April 14, 1828 | April 25, 1846 |
| 39 | 40 | 41 |
| May 6, 1864 | May 17, 1882 | May 28, 1900 |
| 42 | 43 | 44 |
| June 8, 1918 | June 19, 1936 | June 30, 1954 |
| 45 | 46 | 47 |
| July 10, 1972 | July 22, 1990 | August 1, 2008 |
| 48 | 49 | 50 |
| August 12, 2026 | August 23, 2044 | September 3, 2062 |
| 51 | 52 | 53 |
| September 13, 2080 | September 25, 2098 | October 6, 2116 |
| 54 | 55 | 56 |
| October 17, 2134 | October 28, 2152 | November 8, 2170 |
57
November 18, 2188

=== Metonic series ===
The metonic series repeats eclipses every 19 years (6939.69 days), lasting about 5 cycles. Eclipses occur in nearly the same calendar date. In addition, the octon subseries repeats 1/5 of that or every 3.8 years (1387.94 days). All eclipses in this table occur at the Moon's descending node.

22 eclipse events between March 16, 1866 and August 9, 1953
| March 16–17 | January 1–3 | October 20–22 | August 9–10 | May 27–29 |
| 108 | 110 | 112 | 114 | 116 |
|---|---|---|---|---|
| March 16, 1866 | | | August 9, 1877 | May 27, 1881 |
| 118 | 120 | 122 | 124 | 126 |
| March 16, 1885 | January 1, 1889 | October 20, 1892 | August 9, 1896 | May 28, 1900 |
| 128 | 130 | 132 | 134 | 136 |
| March 17, 1904 | January 3, 1908 | October 22, 1911 | August 10, 1915 | May 29, 1919 |
| 138 | 140 | 142 | 144 | 146 |
| March 17, 1923 | January 3, 1927 | October 21, 1930 | August 10, 1934 | May 29, 1938 |
| 148 | 150 | 152 | 154 | |
| March 16, 1942 | January 3, 1946 | October 21, 1949 | August 9, 1953 | |

=== Tritos series ===
This eclipse is a part of a tritos cycle, repeating at alternating nodes every 135 synodic months (≈ 3986.63 days, or 11 years minus 1 month). Their appearance and longitude are irregular due to a lack of synchronization with the anomalistic month (period of perigee), but groupings of 3 tritos cycles (≈ 33 years minus 3 months) come close (≈ 434.044 anomalistic months), so eclipses are similar in these groupings.

Series members between 1801 and 2200
| March 4, 1802 (Saros 117) | February 1, 1813 (Saros 118) | January 1, 1824 (Saros 119) | November 30, 1834 (Saros 120) | October 30, 1845 (Saros 121) |
| September 29, 1856 (Saros 122) | August 29, 1867 (Saros 123) | July 29, 1878 (Saros 124) | June 28, 1889 (Saros 125) | May 28, 1900 (Saros 126) |
| April 28, 1911 (Saros 127) | March 28, 1922 (Saros 128) | February 24, 1933 (Saros 129) | January 25, 1944 (Saros 130) | December 25, 1954 (Saros 131) |
| November 23, 1965 (Saros 132) | October 23, 1976 (Saros 133) | September 23, 1987 (Saros 134) | August 22, 1998 (Saros 135) | July 22, 2009 (Saros 136) |
| June 21, 2020 (Saros 137) | May 21, 2031 (Saros 138) | April 20, 2042 (Saros 139) | March 20, 2053 (Saros 140) | February 17, 2064 (Saros 141) |
| January 16, 2075 (Saros 142) | December 16, 2085 (Saros 143) | November 15, 2096 (Saros 144) | October 16, 2107 (Saros 145) | September 15, 2118 (Saros 146) |
| August 15, 2129 (Saros 147) | July 14, 2140 (Saros 148) | June 14, 2151 (Saros 149) | May 14, 2162 (Saros 150) | April 12, 2173 (Saros 151) |
| March 12, 2184 (Saros 152) | February 10, 2195 (Saros 153) | | | |

=== Inex series ===
This eclipse is a part of the long period inex cycle, repeating at alternating nodes, every 358 synodic months (≈ 10,571.95 days, or 29 years minus 20 days). Their appearance and longitude are irregular due to a lack of synchronization with the anomalistic month (period of perigee). However, groupings of 3 inex cycles (≈ 87 years minus 2 months) comes close (≈ 1,151.02 anomalistic months), so eclipses are similar in these groupings.

Series members between 1801 and 2200
| July 27, 1813 (Saros 123) | July 8, 1842 (Saros 124) | June 18, 1871 (Saros 125) |
| May 28, 1900 (Saros 126) | May 9, 1929 (Saros 127) | April 19, 1958 (Saros 128) |
| March 29, 1987 (Saros 129) | March 9, 2016 (Saros 130) | February 16, 2045 (Saros 131) |
| January 27, 2074 (Saros 132) | January 8, 2103 (Saros 133) | December 19, 2131 (Saros 134) |
| November 27, 2160 (Saros 135) | November 8, 2189 (Saros 136) | |
