= List of solar eclipses in the 19th century =

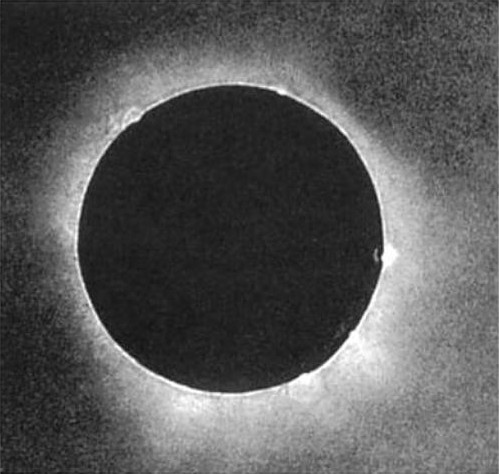
Total solar eclipse of July 28, 1851, from Königsberg, Prussia (now Kaliningrad, Russia).

During the 19th century, there were 242 solar eclipses of which 87 were partial, 77 were annular, 63 were total and 15 were hybrids between total and annular eclipses. In the 19th century, the greatest number of eclipses in one year is five, in 1805, though the years 1801, 1812, 1819, 1823, 1830, 1841, 1848, 1859, 1870, and 1880 had four eclipses each. Two months, January 1805 and December 1880, featured two solar eclipses, on January 1 and January 30 in 1805 and on December 2 and December 31 in 1880. The predictions given here are by Fred Espenak of NASA's Goddard Space Flight Center.

The longest measured duration in which the Moon completely covered the Sun, known as totality, was during the solar eclipse of August 7, 1850. This total solar eclipse had a maximum duration of 6 minutes and 50 seconds. The longest possible duration of a total solar eclipse is 7 minutes and 32 seconds. The longest annular solar eclipse of the 19th century took place on October 30, 1883, with a duration of 10 minutes and 17 seconds. The maximum possible duration is 12 minutes and 29 seconds. Four instances of back-to-back hybrid solar eclipses within a period of less than six months occurred in the 19th century. The first instance occurred on June 6 and November 29, 1807; the second instance occurred on June 16 and December 9, 1825; the third instance occurred on October 20, 1827 and April 14, 1828; and the fourth instance occurred on October 30, 1845 and April 25, 1846.^{[a]}

The table contains the date and time of the greatest eclipse (in dynamical time), which in this case is the time when the axis of the Moon's shadow cone passes closest to the centre of Earth; this is in (Ephemeris Time). The number of the saros series that the eclipse belongs to is given, followed by the type of the eclipse (either total, annular, partial or hybrid), the gamma of the eclipse (how centrally the shadow of the Moon strikes the Earth), and the magnitude of the eclipse (the fraction of the Sun's diameter obscured by the Moon). For total and annular eclipses, the duration of the eclipse is given, as well as the location of the greatest eclipse (the point of maximum eclipse) and the path width of the total or annular eclipse. The geographical areas from which the eclipse can be seen are listed along with a chart illustrating each eclipse's respective path.

== Eclipses ==
Date	Time of greatest eclipse (Terrestrial Time)	Saros	Type	Gamma	Magnitude	Central duration (min:s)	Location	Path width		Geographical area	Chart	Ref(s)
Date	Time of greatest eclipse (Terrestrial Time)	Saros	Type	Gamma	Magnitude	Central duration (min:s)	Location	km	mi	Geographical area	Chart	Ref(s)
March 14, 1801	15:45:35	107	Partial	−1.4433	0.1873	—	61.2°S 40.6°E	—				^{[a]}
April 13, 1801	4:08:06	145	Partial	1.3153	0.4208	—	61.3°N 11.7°E	—				^{[a]}
September 8, 1801	5:54:40	112	Partial	1.4657	0.1614	—	61.1°N 168.5°W	—				^{[a]}
October 7, 1801	19:42:34	150	Partial	−1.3552	0.3505	—	61.2°S 141.3°E	—				^{[a]}
March 4, 1802	5:14:29	117	Total	−0.6942	1.0428	3:02	44.0°S 131.5°E	196	122	Total: Antarctica, Australia, Vanuatu		^{[a]}
August 28, 1802	7:12:00	122	Annular	0.7569	0.9367	5:35	51.3°N 105.7°E	354	220	Annular: Greenland, Svalbard, Russia, Mongolia, China, Ryukyu Islands		^{[a]}
February 21, 1803	21:18:46	127	Total	−0.0074	1.0492	4:09	11.1°S 135.9°W	163	101	Total: Norfolk Island, French Polynesia, Mexico, Southern Florida, Bahamas		^{[a]}
August 17, 1803	8:25:03	132	Annular	−0.0049	0.9657	3:47	13.6°N 54.7°E	124	77	Annular: Western Sahara, Mauritania, Mali, Algeria, Libya, Egypt, Saudi Arabia, Yemen		^{[a]}
February 11, 1804	11:16:33	137	Hybrid	0.7053	1.0000	0:00	26.7°N 4.5°W	0	0	Hybrid: Mauritania, Algeria, Italy, Croatia, Slovenia, Hungary, Slovakia, Poland, Belarus, Russia		^{[a]}
August 5, 1804	15:57:13	142	Total	−0.7623	1.0144	1:20	29.3°S 77.1°W	75	47	Total: Chile, Argentina		^{[a]}
January 1, 1805	1:14:57	109	Partial	−1.5315	0.0642	—	65.0°S 42.1°W	—				^{[a]}
January 30, 1805	18:57:01	147	Partial	1.4650	0.1675	—	62.7°N 152.8°W	—				^{[a]}
June 26, 1805	23:27:40	114	Partial	1.0461	0.9357	—	65.5°N 9.9°W	—				^{[a]}
July 26, 1805	6:14:19	152	Partial	−1.4571	0.1405	—	63.2°S 42.8°E	—				^{[a]}
December 21, 1805	0:17:38	119	Annular	−0.8751	0.9134	6:27	83.1°S 143.8°W	692	430	Annular: Antarctica		^{[a]}
June 16, 1806	16:24:27	124	Total	0.3203	1.0604	4:55	42.2°N 64.6°W	210	130	Total: Mexico, Arizona, New Mexico, Texas, Oklahoma, Colorado, Kansas, Missouri, Iowa, Illinois, Indiana, Michigan, Ohio, Pennsylvania, New York, Connecticut, Massachusetts, Rhode Island, Vermont, New Hampshire, Maine, Western Sahara, Mauritania, Mali, Niger		^{[a]}
December 10, 1806	2:19:40	129	Annular	−0.1627	0.9591	4:32	32.4°S 143.4°E	151	94	Annular: Australia, Tonga		^{[a]}
June 6, 1807	5:18:31	134	Hybrid	−0.4577	1.0055	0:38	4.7°S 100.4°E	21	13	Hybrid: Indonesia, Australia		^{[a]}
November 29, 1807	11:42:09	139	Hybrid	0.5377	1.0135	1:26	11.1°N 3.9°E	55	34	Hybrid: Mauritania, Mali, Burkina Faso, Benin, Nigeria, Cameroon, Chad, Sudan, Saudi Arabia, United Arab Emirates, Iran		^{[a]}
May 25, 1808	11:02:35	144	Partial	−1.2665	0.5064	—	68.4°S 27.8°E	—				^{[a]}
October 19, 1808	16:55:30	111	Partial	−1.4443	0.1687	—	71.3°S 160.8°E	—				^{[a]}
November 18, 1808	2:30:03	149	Partial	1.1875	0.6564	—	69.2°N 162.6°E	—				^{[a]}
April 14, 1809	20:07:11	116	Annular	0.8741	0.9429	4:35	65.8°N 157.3°W	435	270	Annular: Alaska, Northern Canada, Greenland		^{[a]}
October 9, 1809	7:38:42	121	Total	−0.7904	1.0137	1:02	55.1°S 38.4°E	77	48	Total: Antarctica		^{[a]}
April 4, 1810	1:41:19	126	Annular	0.1031	0.9967	0:21	11.1°N 153.8°E	12	7.5	Annular: Indonesia		^{[a]}
September 28, 1810	16:37:25	131	Annular	−0.0697	0.9681	3:45	5.8°S 72.8°W	115	71	Annular: Ecuador, Peru, Brazil, Bolivia		^{[a]}
March 24, 1811	14:12:13	136	Total	−0.6190	1.0416	3:27	35.2°S 18.0°W	176	109	Total: Southern Chile, Southern Argentina, Falkland Islands, Namibia, Botswana, Zimbabwe, Mozambique		^{[a]}
September 17, 1811	18:43:45	141	Annular	0.6798	0.9345	6:51	43.0°N 85.9°W	330	210	Annular: Alaska, Canada, North Dakota, Minnesota, Wisconsin, Michigan, Illinois, Indiana, Ohio, Pennsylvania, West Virginia, Virginia, Maryland, Delaware, North Carolina, Bermuda		^{[a]}
February 12, 1812	20:28:40	108	Partial	1.3544	0.3422	—	70.7°N 168.8°W	—				^{[a]}
March 13, 1812	6:19:31	146	Partial	−1.2914	0.4594	—	71.9°S 173.3°W	—				^{[a]}
August 7, 1812	5:15:50	113	Partial	−1.4205	0.2343	—	70.0°S 67.0°E	—				^{[a]}
September 5, 1812	19:04:10	151	Partial	1.3939	0.2874	—	71.8°N 4.5°E	—				^{[a]}
February 1, 1813	8:58:27	118	Annular	0.7151	0.9820	1:53	27.9°N 40.4°E	91	57	Annular: Morocco, Algeria, Libya, Egypt, Saudi Arabia, Iraq, Iran, Turkmenistan, Uzbekistan, Kyrgyzstan, Kazakhstan, Southern Russia		^{[a]}
July 27, 1813	14:55:35	123	Total	−0.6006	1.0341	3:27	17.4°S 47.4°W	144	89	Total: Chile, Peru, Bolivia, Brazil		^{[a]}
January 21, 1814	14:24:47	128	Annular	0.0253	0.9350	8:28	18.6°S 33.4°W	242	150	Annular: Peru, Bolivia, Brazil, São Tomé and Príncipe, Gabon, Equatorial Guinea, Cameroon, Republic of the Congo, Central African Republic, Democratic Republic of the Congo		^{[a]}
July 17, 1814	6:30:29	133	Total	0.1641	1.0774	6:33	30.9°N 84.7°E	254	158	Total: Chad, Sudan, Egypt, Saudi Arabia, Bahrain, Qatar, Iran, Afghanistan, Pakistan, India, Nepal, China, Myanmar, Philippines		^{[a]}
January 10, 1815	13:57:06	138	Annular	−0.6626	0.9143	7:55	63.7°S 23.6°W	438	272	Annular: Antarctic Peninsula		^{[a]}
July 6, 1815	23:43:07	143	Total	0.9062	1.0593	3:13	88.1°N 162.7°W	470	290	Total: Russia, Northern Canada		^{[a]}
December 30, 1815	14:38:39	148	Partial	−1.3130	0.4273	—	66.7°S 146.4°E	—				^{[a]}
May 27, 1816	3:13:24	115	Annular	−0.9492	0.9791	1:54	48.0°S 153.5°E	238	148	Annular: Antarctica, New Zealand		^{[a]}
November 19, 1816	10:17:23	120	Total	0.8407	1.0233	2:00	35.0°N 41.5°E	144	89	Total: Norway, Sweden, Poland, Ukraine, Romania, Turkey, Syria, Iraq, Iran, Afghanistan, Pakistan, India, Western China		^{[a]}
May 16, 1817	6:58:14	125	Annular	−0.2049	0.9483	6:30	7.9°N 78.5°E	194	121	Annular: South Africa, Lesotho, Eswatini, Mozambique, Madagascar, Maldives, India, Sri Lanka, Myanmar, Thailand, Laos, Vietnam, Philippines, Palau		^{[a]}
November 9, 1817	1:53:53	130	Total	0.1487	1.0536	4:42	8.9°S 150.9°E	179	111	Total: China, Eastern India, Myanmar, Philippines, Palau, Papua New Guinea, Vanuatu, Fiji, Tonga, Niue, Cook Islands, French Polynesia		^{[a]}
May 5, 1818	7:15:49	135	Annular	0.5440	0.9464	5:05	45.8°N 52.5°E	233	145	Annular: Benin, Nigeria, Niger, Chad, Libya, Sudan, Egypt, Israel, Jordan, Syria, Iraq, Turkey, Iran, Armenia, Azerbaijan, Georgia, Russia, Kazakhstan		^{[a]}
October 29, 1818	17:07:10	140	Total	−0.5524	1.0241	1:51	43.1°S 99.4°W	98	61	Total: None		^{[a]}
March 25, 1819	23:44:30	107	Partial	−1.4722	0.1329	—	61.2°S 87.9°W	—				^{[a]}
April 24, 1819	11:31:59	145	Partial	1.2579	0.5225	—	61.7°N 108.0°W	—				^{[a]}
September 19, 1819	13:03:47	112	Partial	1.5258	0.0595	—	61.0°N 75.6°E	—				^{[a]}
October 19, 1819	3:27:17	150	Partial	−1.3226	0.4085	—	61.5°S 16.4°E	—				^{[a]}
March 14, 1820	13:37:15	117	Total	−0.7200	1.0467	3:20	41.5°S 5.7°E	220	140	Total: Antarctica, South Africa, Namibia, Botswana, Zimbabwe, Mozambique, Madagascar		^{[a]}
September 7, 1820	13:59:58	122	Annular	0.8250	0.9329	5:49	51.6°N 8.7°E	432	268	Annular: Greenland, Norway, Denmark, Netherlands, Germany, France, Czech Republic, Austria, Switzerland, Slovenia, Croatia, Italy, Bosnia and Herzegovina, Montenegro, Albania, Greece, Libya, Egypt, Israel, Jordan, Saudi Arabia, Iraq, Kuwait		^{[a]}
March 4, 1821	5:50:13	127	Total	−0.0283	1.0506	4:14	8.0°S 96.3°E	168	104	Total: Lesotho, South Africa, Indonesia, Singapore, Malaysia, Philippines		^{[a]}
August 27, 1821	15:19:42	132	Annular	0.0671	0.9661	3:38	13.6°N 47.8°W	123	76	Annular: Mexico, Arizona, New Mexico, Texas, Arkansas, Louisiana, Mississippi, Alabama, Georgia, South Carolina		^{[a]}
February 21, 1822	19:40:40	137	Annular	0.6914	0.9996	0:02	28.6°N 132.3°W	2	1.2	Annular: California, Nevada, Oregon, Idaho, Montana, Canada		^{[a]}
August 16, 1822	23:14:34	142	Total	−0.6905	1.0173	1:35	26.1°S 173.5°E	80	50	Total: Australia, New Caledonia		^{[a]}
January 12, 1823	9:20:12	109	Partial	−1.5413	0.0484	—	64.0°S 173.0°W	—				^{[a]}
February 11, 1823	3:03:02	147	Partial	1.4546	0.1856	—	62.0°N 76.7°E	—				^{[a]}
July 8, 1823	6:56:28	114	Partial	1.1182	0.7958	—	64.6°N 132.0°W	—				^{[a]}
August 6, 1823	13:45:42	152	Partial	−1.3871	0.2753	—	62.5°S 79.3°W	—				^{[a]}
January 1, 1824	8:21:09	119	Annular	−0.8821	0.9139	6:21	79.9°S 116.2°E	705	438	Annular: Antarctica		^{[a]}
June 26, 1824	23:46:33	124	Total	0.3959	1.0578	4:31	46.6°N 171.4°W	207	129	Total: China, North Korea, South Korea, Japan		^{[a]}
December 20, 1824	10:40:36	129	Annular	−0.1685	0.9610	4:15	33.3°S 20.4°E	144	89	Annular: Brazil, South Africa, Madagascar		^{[a]}
June 16, 1825	12:19:03	134	Hybrid	−0.3812	1.0036	0:25	1.0°N 6.0°W	13	8.1	Hybrid: Bolivia, Brazil, Angola, Democratic Republic of the Congo, Zambia, Mozambique, Madagascar		^{[a]}
December 9, 1825	20:21:45	139	Hybrid	0.5296	1.0148	1:34	9.2°N 127.4°W	60	37	Hybrid: Mexico, Florida		^{[a]}
June 5, 1826	17:39:05	144	Partial	−1.1887	0.6407	—	67.4°S 82.5°W	—				^{[a]}
October 31, 1826	1:20:39	111	Partial	−1.4696	0.1222	—	70.6°S 21.2°E	—				^{[a]}
November 29, 1826	11:14:08	149	Partial	1.1764	0.6770	—	68.2°N 19.9°E	—				^{[a]}
April 26, 1827	3:11:14	116	Annular	0.9316	0.9458	3:53	74.8°N 73.4°E	559	347	Annular: Russia, Northern Canada		^{[a]}
October 20, 1827	15:42:05	121	Hybrid	−0.8252	1.0070	0:30	62.3°S 87.6°W	43	27	Hybrid: Antarctica		^{[a]}
April 14, 1828	9:19:38	126	Hybrid	0.1498	1.0029	0:18	17.9°N 37.7°E	10	6.2	Hybrid: Equatorial Guinea, Cameroon, Central African Republic, Sudan, Saudi Arabia, United Arab Emirates, Iran, Pakistan, India, Nepal, Myanmar, China		^{[a]}
October 9, 1828	0:07:47	131	Annular	−0.1139	0.9623	4:26	12.5°S 173.0°E	137	85	Annular: Philippines, Palau, Fiji, Tonga, Pitcairn Islands		^{[a]}
April 3, 1829	22:18:36	136	Total	−0.5803	1.0474	4:05	28.5°S 142.6°W	192	119	Total: None		^{[a]}
September 28, 1829	1:46:53	141	Annular	0.6244	0.9317	7:43	34.9°N 164.3°E	323	201	Annular: Russia, Northeastern China, Northern Japan, Hawaii		^{[a]}
February 23, 1830	5:04:13	108	Partial	1.3716	0.3100	—	71.3°N 49.0°E	—				^{[a]}
March 24, 1830	14:38:43	146	Partial	−1.2622	0.5148	—	72.0°S 47.7°E	—				^{[a]}
August 18, 1830	12:13:35	113	Partial	−1.4865	0.1171	—	70.7°S 50.2°W	—				^{[a]}
September 17, 1830	2:08:12	151	Partial	1.3325	0.3930	—	72.1°N 115.6°W	—				^{[a]}
February 12, 1831	17:21:45	118	Annular	0.7288	0.9807	1:57	31.9°N 88.3°W	100	62	Annular: Mexico, Texas, Louisiana, Mississippi, Alabama, Georgia, South Carolina, North Carolina, Virginia, Maryland, Delaware, New Jersey, Massachusetts, Canada		^{[a]}
August 7, 1831	22:15:59	123	Total	−0.6691	1.0349	3:20	24.9°S 160.9°W	158	98	Total: Australia		^{[a]}
February 1, 1832	22:30:14	128	Annular	0.0355	0.9344	8:35	15.3°S 154.4°W	245	152	Annular: Papua New Guinea, Vanuatu, Fiji, Tonga, Niue, Cook Islands, French Polynesia		^{[a]}
July 27, 1832	14:01:06	133	Total	0.0919	1.0776	6:46	24.5°N 27.9°W	252	157	Total: Mexico, Guatemala, Belize, Honduras, Cayman Islands, Jamaica, Cuba, Haiti, Turks and Caicos Islands, Bahamas, Western Sahara, Mauritania, Mali, Burkina Faso, Niger, Benin, Nigeria, Cameroon, Central African Republic, Republic of the Congo, Democratic Republic of the Congo, Uganda, Rwanda, Tanzania		^{[a]}
January 20, 1833	21:56:55	138	Annular	−0.6530	0.9155	7:59	60.6°S 137.4°W	426	265	Annular: Chile, Argentina		^{[a]}
July 17, 1833	7:08:02	143	Total	0.8348	1.0591	3:29	77.5°N 92.5°E	357	222	Total: Iceland, Russian Far East		^{[a]}
January 9, 1834	22:55:31	148	Partial	−1.3043	0.4418	—	67.8°S 11.3°E	—				^{[a]}
June 7, 1834	10:08:38	115	Partial	−1.0291	0.9295	—	64.6°S 55.4°E	—				^{[a]}
November 30, 1834	18:56:35	120	Total	0.8497	1.0233	2:02	34.9°N 91.6°W	150	93	Total: Canada, Montana, Wyoming, Nebraska, Colorado, Kansas, Oklahoma, Missouri, Arkansas, Mississippi, Alabama, Georgia, South Carolina		^{[a]}
May 27, 1835	13:35:42	125	Annular	−0.2846	0.9486	6:44	5.3°N 20.2°W	196	122	Annular: Chile, Argentina, Paraguay, Brazil, Sierra Leone, Guinea, Liberia, Côte d'Ivoire, Mali, Burkina Faso, Ghana, Togo, Benin, Nigeria, Cameroon, Chad, Central African Republic, Democratic Republic of the Congo, Uganda, Kenya		^{[a]}
November 20, 1835	10:31:58	130	Total	0.1649	1.0510	4:35	10.7°S 21.6°E	171	106	Total: Mauritania, Senegal, Mali, Burkina Faso, Côte d'Ivoire, Ghana, São Tomé and Príncipe, Gabon, Republic of the Congo, Democratic Republic of the Congo, Angola, Zambia, Mozambique, Malawi, Madagascar		^{[a]}
May 15, 1836	14:01:39	135	Annular	0.4699	0.9509	4:47	45.1°N 44.4°W	203	126	Annular: El Salvador, Honduras, Nicaragua, Jamaica, Cuba, Haiti, Bahamas, Turks and Caicos Islands, Ireland, United Kingdom, Germany, Denmark, Sweden, Poland, Lithuania, Belarus, Ukraine, Russia, Kazakhstan		^{[a]}
November 9, 1836	1:29:26	140	Total	−0.5327	1.0191	1:28	46.1°S 136.8°E	77	48	Total: Australia		^{[a]}
April 5, 1837	7:35:30	107	Partial	−1.5080	0.0651	—	61.3°S 145.6°E	—				^{[a]}
May 4, 1837	18:48:28	145	Partial	1.1934	0.6381	—	62.3°N 133.9°E	—				^{[a]}
October 29, 1837	11:19:24	150	Partial	−1.2967	0.4542	—	61.9°S 110.5°W	—				^{[a]}
March 25, 1838	21:52:16	117	Total	−0.7524	1.0505	3:39	39.7°S 118.3°W	249	155	Total: Antarctica		^{[a]}
September 18, 1838	20:55:56	122	Annular	0.8867	0.9289	6:06	52.4°N 90.6°W	562	349	Annular: Canada, Minnesota, Wisconsin, Michigan, Indiana, Ohio, Pennsylvania, Kentucky, New York, New Jersey, West Virginia, Delaware, Maryland, Virginia, North Carolina		^{[a]}
March 15, 1839	14:13:42	127	Total	−0.0558	1.0520	4:20	5.1°S 29.5°W	172	107	Total: Chile, Argentina, Paraguay, Brazil, Guinea, Guinea-Bissau, Senegal, Mali, Mauritania, Algeria, Niger, Libya, Egypt		^{[a]}
September 7, 1839	22:23:26	132	Annular	0.1324	0.9661	3:34	12.8°N 152.7°W	123	76	Annular: Japan, Hawaii		^{[a]}
March 4, 1840	3:58:22	137	Annular	0.6727	0.9995	0:03	30.6°N 101.7°E	2	1.2	Annular: India, Bangladesh, Myanmar, China, Mongolia, Russian Far East		^{[a]}
August 27, 1840	6:37:32	142	Total	−0.6223	1.0195	1:45	24.3°S 62.9°E	83	52	Total: Angola, Democratic Republic of the Congo, Zambia, Malawi, Tanzania, Mozambique, Comoros, Madagascar		^{[a]}
January 22, 1841	17:24:16	109	Partial	−1.5516	0.0316	—	63.1°S 56.6°E	—				^{[a]}
February 21, 1841	11:03:56	147	Partial	1.4406	0.2095	—	61.5°N 52.4°W	—				^{[a]}
July 18, 1841	14:25:14	114	Partial	1.1903	0.6556	—	63.7°N 106.2°E	—				^{[a]}
August 16, 1841	21:20:24	152	Partial	−1.3193	0.4059	—	61.9°S 158.0°E	—				^{[a]}
January 11, 1842	16:25:41	119	Annular	−0.8882	0.9151	6:15	75.8°S 1.4°E	710	440	Annular: Antarctica		^{[a]}
July 8, 1842	7:06:27	124	Total	0.4726	1.0543	4:05	50.1°N 83.6°E	204	127	Total: Portugal, Spain, Andorra, France, Monaco, Italy, Austria, Slovenia, Hungary, Slovakia, Poland, Ukraine, Belarus, Russia, Kazakhstan, Mongolia, China, Ryukyu Islands, Northern Mariana Islands		^{[a]}
December 31, 1842	19:04:24	129	Annular	−0.1727	0.9634	3:54	33.1°S 103.2°W	135	84	Annular: Tonga, Peru, Bolivia, Brazil		^{[a]}
June 27, 1843	19:17:03	134	Hybrid	−0.3038	1.0011	0:07	5.9°N 111.0°W	4	2.5	Hybrid: Peru, Bolivia, Paraguay		^{[a]}
December 21, 1843	5:03:26	139	Total	0.5227	1.0165	1:43	8.0°N 101.0°E	66	41	Total: Saudi Arabia, Oman, India, Andaman and Nicobar Islands, Thailand, Vietnam, Philippines		^{[a]}
June 16, 1844	0:13:22	144	Partial	−1.1092	0.7778	—	66.4°S 168.3°E	—				^{[a]}
November 10, 1844	9:51:45	111	Partial	−1.4901	0.0847	—	69.8°S 119.3°W	—				^{[a]}
December 9, 1844	20:01:39	149	Partial	1.1682	0.6924	—	67.1°N 123.0°W	—				^{[a]}
May 6, 1845	10:09:00	116	Annular	0.9945	0.9462	3:15	73.4°N 110.6°W	—		Annular: Northern Canada		^{[a]}
October 30, 1845	23:51:58	121	Hybrid	−0.8537	1.0005	0:02	69.1°S 144.5°E	3	1.9	Hybrid: Antarctica		^{[a]}
April 25, 1846	16:50:30	126	Hybrid	0.2037	1.0088	0:53	24.8°N 76.2°W	31	19	Hybrid: Mexico, Guatemala, Belize, Cuba, Bahamas, Canary Islands, Western Sahara, Mauritania, Algeria		^{[a]}
October 20, 1846	7:46:12	131	Annular	−0.1506	0.9567	5:05	18.7°S 57.3°E	159	99	Annular: Ghana, Togo, Benin, Nigeria, Cameroon, Central African Republic, Republic of the Congo, Democratic Republic of the Congo, Rwanda, Burundi, Tanzania, Madagascar, Australia		^{[a]}
April 15, 1847	6:16:13	136	Total	−0.5339	1.0530	4:44	21.6°S 95.0°E	206	128	Total: Australia		^{[a]}
October 9, 1847	9:00:23	141	Annular	0.5774	0.9290	8:35	27.7°N 52.8°E	323	201	Annular: Ireland, United Kingdom, France, Belgium, Luxembourg, Germany, Switzerland, Italy, Austria, Slovenia, Croatia, Hungary, Bosnia and Herzegovina, Serbia, Montenegro, Kosovo, Romania, Bulgaria, North Macedonia, Greece, Turkey, Syria, Iraq, Iran, Kuwait, United Arab Emirates, Oman, India, Myanmar, Thailand, Laos, Vietnam		^{[a]}
March 5, 1848	13:31:35	108	Partial	1.3950	0.2662	—	71.8°N 91.7°W	—				^{[a]}
April 3, 1848	22:49:07	146	Partial	−1.2264	0.5834	—	71.8°S 89.0°W	—				^{[a]}
August 28, 1848	19:18:22	113	Partial	−1.5474	0.0090	—	71.3°S 169.6°W	—				^{[a]}
September 27, 1848	9:21:19	151	Partial	1.2773	0.4875	—	72.2°N 121.9°E	—				^{[a]}
February 23, 1849	1:38:09	118	Annular	0.7474	0.9796	1:58	36.7°N 144.3°E	108	67	Annular: China, Japan, Alaska		^{[a]}
August 18, 1849	5:40:49	123	Total	−0.7343	1.0349	3:07	32.9°S 83.5°E	172	107	Total: None		^{[a]}
February 12, 1850	6:29:37	128	Annular	0.0503	0.9345	8:35	11.0°S 85.6°E	245	152	Annular: Angola, Democratic Republic of the Congo, Zambia, Malawi, Mozambique, Madagascar, Indonesia, Malaysia, Brunei, Philippines		^{[a]}
August 7, 1850	21:33:54	133	Total	0.0215	1.0769	6:50	17.7°N 141.8°W	249	155	Total: Hawaii		^{[a]}
February 1, 1851	5:54:27	138	Annular	−0.6413	0.9175	8:01	56.4°S 106.9°E	409	254	Annular: Australia, Norfolk Island		^{[a]}
July 28, 1851	14:33:42	143	Total	0.7643	1.0577	3:41	68.0°N 19.6°W	296	184	Total: Alaska, Canada, Greenland, Iceland, Norway, Sweden, Denmark, Poland, Lithuania, Belarus, Ukraine, Russia, Georgia, Armenia, Azerbaijan		^{[a]}
January 21, 1852	7:12:16	148	Partial	−1.2948	0.4577	—	68.9°S 124.3°W	—				^{[a]}
June 17, 1852	16:59:50	115	Partial	−1.1111	0.7828	—	65.6°S 57.3°W	—				^{[a]}
December 11, 1852	3:40:44	120	Total	0.8551	1.0237	2:05	35.2°N 133.9°E	156	97	Total: Russia, Mongolia, China, North Korea, South Korea, Japan		^{[a]}
June 6, 1853	20:07:21	125	Annular	−0.3686	0.9486	6:59	1.5°N 117.9°W	203	126	Annular: Cook Islands, French Polynesia, Ecuador, Peru, Brazil		^{[a]}
November 30, 1853	19:15:39	130	Total	0.1763	1.0485	4:28	12.0°S 109.0°W	164	102	Total: Peru, Bolivia, Brazil		^{[a]}
May 26, 1854	20:42:53	135	Annular	0.3918	0.9551	4:32	43.3°N 140.1°W	178	111	Annular: Marshall Islands, Canada, Washington, Idaho, Montana, North Dakota, Minnesota, Michigan, New York, Vermont, New Hampshire, Massachusetts, Maine		^{[a]}
November 20, 1854	9:56:58	140	Hybrid	−0.5179	1.0144	1:07	48.9°S 12.7°E	57	35	Hybrid: Brazil		^{[a]}
May 16, 1855	2:01:12	145	Partial	1.1249	0.7624	—	62.9°N 16.6°E	—				^{[a]}
November 9, 1855	19:17:51	150	Partial	−1.2767	0.4892	—	62.5°S 121.0°E	—				^{[a]}
April 5, 1856	6:01:01	117	Total	−0.7906	1.0539	3:56	39.1°S 119.2°E	285	177	Total: Antarctica, Australia		^{[a]}
September 29, 1856	3:59:44	122	Annular	0.9420	0.9246	6:21	54.3°N 169.1°E	831	516	Annular: Russian Far East		^{[a]}
March 25, 1857	22:29:38	127	Total	−0.0892	1.0534	4:28	2.4°S 153.4°W	177	110	Total: Australia, Niue, Cook Islands, Mexico		^{[a]}
September 18, 1857	5:36:05	132	Annular	0.1912	0.9659	3:34	11.6°N 100.0°E	125	78	Annular: Turkey, Armenia, Azerbaijan, Iran, Turkmenistan, Afghanistan, Pakistan, India, Nepal, China, Bangladesh, Myanmar, Thailand, Indonesia, Australia		^{[a]}
March 15, 1858	12:05:28	137	Annular	0.6461	0.9996	0:02	32.7°N 20.9°W	2	1.2	Annular: Trinidad and Tobago, United Kingdom, Norway, Sweden, Finland, Russia		^{[a]}
September 7, 1858	14:09:29	142	Total	−0.5609	1.0210	1:50	23.9°S 49.8°W	85	53	Total: Peru, Brazil, Bolivia		^{[a]}
February 3, 1859	1:22:42	109	Partial	−1.5659	0.0077	—	62.4°S 72.1°W	—				^{[a]}
March 4, 1859	18:54:49	147	Partial	1.4193	0.2461	—	61.2°N 178.8°W	—				^{[a]}
July 29, 1859	21:56:57	114	Partial	1.2598	0.5205	—	63.0°N 16.0°W	—				^{[a]}
August 28, 1859	5:02:00	152	Partial	−1.2569	0.5261	—	61.5°S 33.7°E	—				^{[a]}
January 23, 1860	0:27:31	119	Annular	−0.8969	0.9168	6:07	71.8°S 117.2°W	719	447	Annular: Antarctica		^{[a]}
July 18, 1860	14:26:24	124	Total	0.5487	1.0500	3:39	52.5°N 20.3°W	198	123	Total: Oregon, Washington, Idaho, Montana, Canada, Spain, Algeria, Tunisia, Libya, Egypt, Sudan, Eritrea		^{[a]}
January 11, 1861	3:29:23	129	Annular	−0.1767	0.9664	3:30	31.8°S 132.7°E	123	76	Annular: Australia, Kiribati		^{[a]}
July 8, 1861	2:10:26	134	Annular	−0.2231	0.9979	0:14	10.0°N 145.8°E	7	4.3	Annular: Indonesia, Malaysia, Thailand, Philippines, Tonga		^{[a]}
December 31, 1861	13:49:06	139	Total	0.5186	1.0186	1:55	7.8°N 31.6°W	74	46	Total: Venezuela, Trinidad and Tobago, Senegal, Mauritania, Mali, Algeria, Tunisia, Libya, Greece		^{[a]}
June 27, 1862	6:42:21	144	Partial	−1.0252	0.9222	—	65.4°S 60.8°E	—				^{[a]}
November 21, 1862	18:29:48	111	Partial	−1.5051	0.0580	—	68.8°S 99.1°E	—				^{[a]}
December 21, 1862	4:53:03	149	Partial	1.1633	0.7016	—	66.0°N 93.6°E	—				^{[a]}
May 17, 1863	17:00:45	116	Partial	1.0627	0.8606	—	69.2°N 126.8°E	—				^{[a]}
November 11, 1863	8:09:03	121	Annular	−0.8759	0.9943	0:22	75.4°S 15.1°E	42	26	Annular: Antarctica		^{[a]}
May 6, 1864	0:16:48	126	Hybrid	0.2621	1.0146	1:25	31.6°N 171.5°E	52	32	Hybrid: Malaysia, Philippines		^{[a]}
October 30, 1864	15:30:31	131	Annular	−0.1816	0.9514	5:41	24.3°S 59.3°W	181	112	Annular: Peru, Chile, Bolivia, Argentina, Paraguay, Brazil		^{[a]}
April 25, 1865	14:08:34	136	Total	−0.4826	1.0584	5:23	14.8°S 25.8°W	219	136	Total: Chile, Argentina, Uruguay, Brazil, Angola, Zambia, Mozambique		^{[a]}
October 19, 1865	16:21:14	141	Annular	0.5366	0.9263	9:27	21.3°N 60.2°W	326	203	Annular: Washington, Oregon, Idaho, Montana, Wyoming, South Dakota, Nebraska, Colorado, Kansas, Iowa, Missouri, Illinois, Indiana, Arkansas, Kentucky, Tennessee, North Carolina, South Carolina, Alabama, Georgia, Cape Verde, Senegal, Mauritania, Mali		^{[a]}
March 16, 1866	21:51:25	108	Partial	1.4241	0.2114	—	72.0°N 129.2°E	—				^{[a]}
April 15, 1866	6:51:40	146	Partial	−1.1846	0.6637	—	71.4°S 136.6°E	—				^{[a]}
October 8, 1866	16:44:22	151	Partial	1.2296	0.5693	—	71.9°N 3.0°W	—				^{[a]}
March 6, 1867	9:46:48	118	Annular	0.7716	0.9787	1:57	42.3°N 18.4°E	118	73	Annular: Morocco, Algeria, Italy, Bosnia and Herzegovina, Montenegro, Albania, Kosovo, Serbia, Romania, Moldova, Ukraine, Russia		^{[a]}
August 29, 1867	13:13:07	123	Total	−0.7940	1.0344	2:51	41.1°S 34.9°W	189	117	Total: Chile, Argentina, Uruguay		^{[a]}
February 23, 1868	14:21:31	128	Annular	0.0706	0.9348	8:30	6.1°S 33.0°W	244	152	Annular: Peru, Bolivia, Brazil, Sierra Leone, Liberia, Guinea, Côte d'Ivoire, Mali, Burkina Faso, Ghana, Niger, Nigeria, Chad, Libya, Sudan		^{[a]}
August 18, 1868	5:12:10	133	Total	−0.0443	1.0756	6:47	10.6°N 102.2°E	245	152	Total: Ethiopia, Eritrea, Djibouti, Yemen, India, Myanmar, Thailand, Cambodia, Vietnam, Malaysia, Brunei, Indonesia, Papua New Guinea		^{[a]}
February 11, 1869	13:46:39	138	Annular	−0.6252	0.9201	8:02	51.3°S 9.7°W	387	240	Annular: South Africa, Lesotho, Madagascar		^{[a]}
August 7, 1869	22:01:05	143	Total	0.6960	1.0551	3:48	59.1°N 133.2°W	254	158	Total: Russian Far East, Alaska, Canada, Montana, North Dakota, South Dakota, Minnesota, Nebraska, Iowa, Missouri, Illinois, Indiana, Kentucky, Tennessee, Virginia, West Virginia, North Carolina, South Carolina		^{[a]}
January 31, 1870	15:26:25	148	Partial	−1.2829	0.4781	—	69.9°S 100.0°E	—				^{[a]}
June 28, 1870	23:46:43	115	Partial	−1.1949	0.6335	—	66.6°S 169.4°W	—				^{[a]}
July 28, 1870	11:02:31	153	Partial	1.5044	0.0742	—	69.2°N 170.9°E	—				^{[a]}
December 22, 1870	12:27:33	120	Total	0.8585	1.0248	2:11	35.7°N 1.5°W	165	103	Total: Portugal, Spain, Algeria, Tunisia, Italy, Greece, Turkey, Bulgaria, Ukraine, Russia		^{[a]}
June 18, 1871	2:35:01	125	Annular	−0.4550	0.9481	7:14	3.5°S 144.7°E	214	133	Annular: Indonesia, Papua New Guinea, Wallis and Futuna, Samoa, American Samoa, Cook Islands		^{[a]}
December 12, 1871	4:03:38	130	Total	0.1836	1.0465	4:23	12.7°S 119.4°E	157	98	Total: India, Sri Lanka, Indonesia, Australia, Solomon Islands, Kiribati		^{[a]}
June 6, 1872	3:20:03	135	Annular	0.3095	0.9590	4:20	40.5°N 124.8°E	157	98	Annular: India, Bangladesh, Myanmar, China, North Korea, Russia, Japan		^{[a]}
November 30, 1872	18:29:33	140	Hybrid	−0.5081	1.0099	0:47	51.2°S 111.8°W	40	25	Hybrid: None		^{[a]}
May 26, 1873	9:08:56	145	Partial	1.0513	0.8971	—	63.7°N 99.6°W	—				^{[a]}
November 20, 1873	3:22:52	150	Partial	−1.2624	0.5138	—	63.2°S 9.5°W	—				^{[a]}
April 16, 1874	14:00:53	117	Total	−0.8384	1.0569	4:11	39.9°S 0.9°W	335	208	Total: Antarctica, South Africa, Namibia, Lesotho		^{[a]}
October 10, 1874	11:13:33	122	Annular	0.9889	0.9193	6:28	58.6°N 72.0°E	—		Annular: Russia, Kazakhstan		^{[a]}
April 6, 1875	06:37:26	127	Total	−0.1292	1.0547	4:37	0.2°S 84.8°E	182	113	Total: Myanmar, Thailand, Cambodia, Laos, Vietnam, China		^{[a]}
September 29, 1875	12:58:09	132	Annular	0.2428	0.9656	3:36	10.0°N 10.1°W	127	79	Annular: New York, Vermont, New Hampshire, Massachusetts, Maine, Mauritania, Senegal, Guinea, Liberia, Côte d'Ivoire, Angola, Zambia, Malawi, Mozambique		^{[a]}
March 25, 1876	20:05:06	137	Annular	0.6143	0.9999	0:01	34.8°N 141.1°W	1	0.62	Annular: Hawaii, Canada, Greenland		^{[a]}
September 17, 1876	21:49:15	142	Total	−0.5054	1.0220	1:53	24.6°S 164.5°W	86	53	Total: Niue		^{[a]}
March 15, 1877	02:38:09	147	Partial	1.3924	0.2917	—	61.0°N 56.7°E	—				^{[a]}
August 9, 1877	5:30:24	114	Partial	1.3277	0.3889	—	62.3°N 138.6°W	—				^{[a]}
September 7, 1877	12:48:42	152	Partial	−1.1985	0.6382	—	61.2°S 91.8°W	—				^{[a]}
February 2, 1878	8:27:52	119	Annular	−0.9071	0.9191	5:59	67.9°S 122.4°E	729	453	Annular: Antarctica, Australia		^{[a]}
July 29, 1878	21:47:18	124	Total	0.6233	1.0450	3:11	53.8°N 124.0°W	191	119	Total: Russian Far East, Alaska, Canada, Washington, Idaho, Montana, Wyoming, Colorado, Kansas, Oklahoma, Texas, Louisiana, Cuba, Haiti, Dominican Republic		^{[a]}
January 22, 1879	11:53:08	129	Annular	−0.1824	0.9700	3:03	29.8°S 8.5°E	110	68	Annular: Argentina, Uruguay, Brazil, Namibia, Botswana, Zambia, Democratic Republic of the Congo, Malawi, Tanzania		^{[a]}
July 19, 1879	9:04:32	134	Annular	−0.1440	0.9942	0:39	13.0°N 42.9°E	20	12	Annular: Guinea, Mali, Burkina Faso, Niger, Chad, Sudan, Eritrea, Somalia		^{[a]}
January 11, 1880	22:34:25	139	Total	0.5136	1.0212	2:07	8.3°N 164.1°W	84	52	Total: Northern Mariana Islands, Marshall Islands, California, Nevada, Utah, Wyoming		^{[a]}
July 7, 1880	13:10:28	144	Annular	−0.9406	0.9441	5:47	46.4°S 33.4°W	611	380	Annular: Falkland Islands		^{[a]}
December 2, 1880	3:11:33	111	Partial	−1.5172	0.0369	—	67.8°S 42.9°W	—				^{[a]}
December 31, 1880	13:45:01	149	Partial	1.1591	0.7096	—	65.0°N 49.5°W	—				^{[a]}
May 27, 1881	23:48:41	116	Partial	1.1345	0.7370	—	68.2°N 13.3°E	—				^{[a]}
November 21, 1881	16:31:10	121	Annular	−0.8931	0.9887	0:43	81.2°S 114.5°W	90	56	Annular: Antarctica		^{[a]}
May 17, 1882	7:36:27	126	Total	0.3269	1.0200	1:50	38.4°N 61.6°E	72	45	Total: Burkina Faso, Ghana, Niger, Nigeria, Chad, Libya, Egypt, Saudi Arabia, Iraq, Iran, Turkmenistan, Uzbekistan, Tajikistan, Kyrgyzstan, China		^{[a]}
November 10, 1882	23:22:21	131	Annular	−0.2056	0.9465	6:14	29.2°S 177.0°W	201	125	Annular: Indonesia, Papua New Guinea, New Caledonia		^{[a]}
May 6, 1883	21:53:49	136	Total	−0.4250	1.0634	5:58	8.1°S 144.6°W	229	142	Total: Cook Islands		^{[a]}
October 30, 1883	23:50:54	141	Annular	0.5030	0.9238	10:17	15.6°N 174.9°W	331	206	Annular: China, North Korea, Japan		^{[a]}
March 27, 1884	6:02:11	108	Partial	1.4602	0.1436	—	72.0°N 7.7°W	—				^{[a]}
April 25, 1884	14:46:17	146	Partial	−1.1365	0.7563	—	70.7°S 4.6°E	—				^{[a]}
October 19, 1884	0:17:42	151	Partial	1.1892	0.6385	—	71.5°N 130.2°W	—				^{[a]}
March 16, 1885	17:45:43	118	Annular	0.8030	0.9778	1:55	48.9°N 106.1°W	132	82	Annular: California, Nevada, Oregon, Idaho, Montana, Canada, Greenland		^{[a]}
September 8, 1885	20:51:52	123	Total	−0.8489	1.0332	2:31	49.6°S 156.5°W	211	131	Total: New Zealand, Antarctica		^{[a]}
March 5, 1886	22:05:26	128	Annular	0.0971	0.9357	8:20	0.5°S 150.1°W	241	150	Annular: Papua New Guinea, Solomon Islands, Fiji, Tokelau, Mexico		^{[a]}
August 29, 1886	12:55:23	133	Total	−0.1059	1.0735	6:36	3.5°N 15.3°W	240	150	Total: Panama, Colombia, Venezuela, Curaçao, Trinidad and Tobago, Grenada, Saint Vincent and the Grenadines, Barbados, Angola, Zambia, Zimbabwe, Mozambique, Madagascar		^{[a]}
February 22, 1887	21:33:04	138	Annular	−0.6040	0.9232	8:01	45.7°S 126.5°W	362	225	Annular: Chile		^{[a]}
August 19, 1887	5:32:05	143	Total	0.6313	1.0518	3:50	50.6°N 111.9°E	221	137	Total: Germany, Poland, Belarus, Lithuania, Russia, Mongolia, China, North Korea, Japan		^{[a]}
February 11, 1888	23:38:15	148	Partial	−1.2685	0.5029	—	70.7°S 35.7°W	—				^{[a]}
July 9, 1888	6:30:52	115	Partial	−1.2797	0.4832	—	67.6°S 78.8°E	—				^{[a]}
August 7, 1888	18:05:46	153	Partial	1.4368	0.1983	—	70.1°N 53.0°E	—				^{[a]}
January 1, 1889	21:16:50	120	Total	0.8603	1.0262	2:17	36.7°N 137.6°W	175	109	Total: Aleutian Islands, California, Nevada, Idaho, Wyoming, Montana, North Dakota, Canada		^{[a]}
June 28, 1889	9:00:00	125	Annular	−0.5431	0.9471	7:22	9.6°S 47.3°E	232	144	Annular: Namibia, Botswana, Zimbabwe, Zambia, Malawi, Mozambique, Tanzania		^{[a]}
December 22, 1889	12:54:15	130	Total	0.1888	1.0449	4:18	12.7°S 12.8°W	152	94	Total: Venezuela, Trinidad and Tobago, French Guiana, Angola, Democratic Republic of the Congo, Burundi, Rwanda, Tanzania, Kenya, Somalia		^{[a]}
June 17, 1890	9:55:05	135	Annular	0.2246	0.9625	4:09	36.5°N 29.3°E	140	87	Annular: Guinea-Bissau, Gambia, Senegal, Mauritania, Mali, Algeria, Libya, Greece, Turkey, Syria, Iraq, Iran, Afghanistan, Pakistan, India, Nepal, Bangladesh, Myanmar, Thailand, Laos		^{[a]}
December 12, 1890	3:05:28	140	Hybrid	−0.5016	1.0059	0:28	52.8°S 123.9°E	24	15	Hybrid: None		^{[a]}
June 6, 1891	16:15:36	145	Annular	0.9754	0.9981	0:06	74.5°N 163.8°E	33	21	Annular: Russian Far East		^{[a]}
December 1, 1891	11:31:08	150	Partial	−1.2514	0.5326	—	64.1°S 140.9°W	—				^{[a]}
April 26, 1892	21:55:20	117	Total	−0.8870	1.0591	4:19	42.5°S 119.4°W	414	257	Total: Antarctica		^{[a]}
October 20, 1892	18:36:06	122	Partial	1.0286	0.9054	—	61.4°N 33.3°W	—				^{[a]}
April 16, 1893	14:36:11	127	Total	−0.1763	1.0556	4:47	1.3°N 34.6°W	186	116	Total: Chile, Argentina, Paraguay, Brazil, Senegal, Gambia, Mauritania, Mali, Niger, Chad, Sudan		^{[a]}
October 9, 1893	20:30:22	132	Annular	0.2867	0.9652	3:41	8.1°N 123.0°W	130	81	Annular: Peru, Bolivia		^{[a]}
April 6, 1894	3:53:41	137	Hybrid	0.5740	1.0001	0:01	36.7°N 102.4°E	1	0.62	Hybrid: India, Bangladesh, China, Mongolia, Russia, Alaska		^{[a]}
September 29, 1894	5:39:02	142	Total	−0.4573	1.0226	1:55	26.1°S 78.5°E	85	53	Total: Democratic Republic of the Congo, Uganda, Kenya, Somalia, Seychelles		^{[a]}
March 26, 1895	10:09:33	147	Partial	1.3565	0.3531	—	61.0°N 64.8°W	—				^{[a]}
August 20, 1895	13:09:16	114	Partial	1.3911	0.2665	—	61.8°N 97.7°E	—				^{[a]}
September 18, 1895	20:44:01	152	Partial	−1.1470	0.7369	—	61.0°S 140.7°E	—				^{[a]}
February 13, 1896	16:23:13	119	Annular	−0.9220	0.9218	5:48	64.6°S 3.5°E	761	473	Annular: Antarctica		^{[a]}
August 9, 1896	5:09:00	124	Total	0.6963	1.0392	2:43	54.4°N 132.2°E	182	113	Total: Norway, Sweden, Finland, Russia, Japan		^{[a]}
February 1, 1897	20:15:15	129	Annular	−0.1903	0.9742	2:34	27.1°S 115.7°W	94	58	Annular: Colombia, Venezuela, Trinidad and Tobago		^{[a]}
July 29, 1897	15:56:58	134	Annular	−0.0640	0.9899	1:05	15.3°N 59.0°W	35	22	Annular: Mexico, Bahamas, Turks and Caicos Islands, British Virgin Islands, Sint Maarten, Antigua and Barbuda, Brazil		^{[a]}
January 22, 1898	7:19:12	139	Total	0.5079	1.0244	2:21	9.5°N 63.6°E	96	60	Total: Nigeria, Cameroon, Chad, Central African Republic, South Sudan, Kenya, Ethiopia, Somalia, India, Nepal, China		^{[a]}
July 18, 1898	19:36:54	144	Annular	−0.8547	0.9450	6:11	35.7°S 130.1°W	385	239	Annular: None		^{[a]}
December 13, 1898	11:58:13	111	Partial	−1.5252	0.0231	—	66.8°S 174.5°E	—				^{[a]}
January 11, 1899	22:38:02	149	Partial	1.1559	0.7158	—	64.0°N 167.5°E	—				^{[a]}
June 8, 1899	6:33:43	116	Partial	1.2089	0.6076	—	67.2°N 98.9°W	—				^{[a]}
December 3, 1899	0:57:28	121	Annular	−0.9061	0.9836	1:01	86.6°S 121.5°E	140	87	Annular: Antarctica		^{[a]}
May 28, 1900	14:53:56	126	Total	0.3943	1.0249	2:10	44.8°N 46.5°W	92	57	Total: Mexico, Texas, Louisiana, Mississippi, Alabama, Georgia, South Carolina, North Carolina, Virginia, Portugal, Spain, Algeria, Tunisia, Libya, Egypt		^{[a]}
November 22, 1900	7:19:43	131	Annular	−0.2245	0.9421	6:42	33.1°S 64.8°E	220	140	Annular: Angola, Zambia, Zimbabwe, Mozambique, Madagascar, Australia		^{[a]}

== See also ==
- List of solar eclipses in the 18th century
- List of solar eclipses in the 20th century
- List of solar eclipses in the 21st century
