= 1919 solar eclipse =

Two solar eclipses occurred during 1919:

- The total solar eclipse of May 29, 1919, used for a famous experiment demonstrating general relativity
- The annular solar eclipse of November 22, 1919
