= Solar eclipse of January 14, 1945 =

20th-century annular solar eclipse

- Annular eclipse
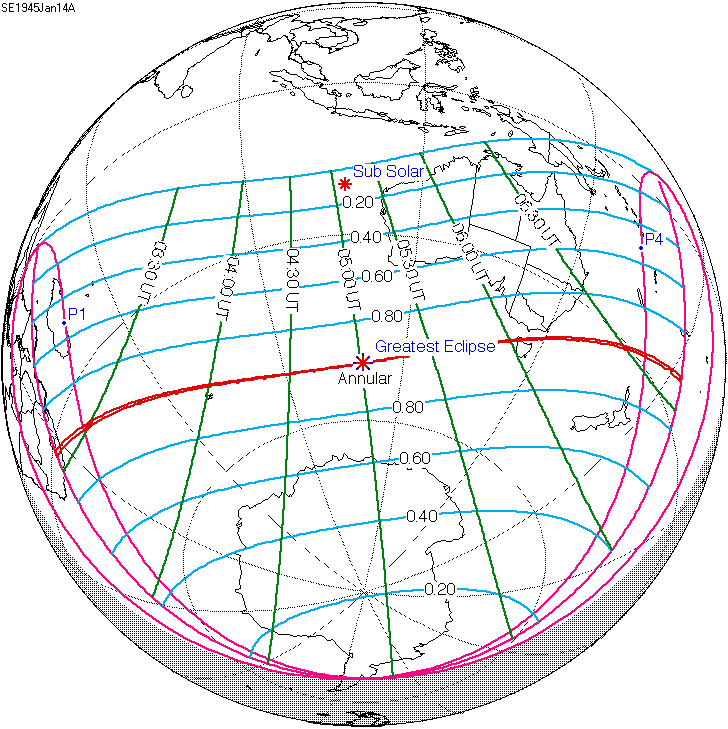
- Map
- Gamma: −0.4937
- Magnitude: 0.997

Maximum eclipse
- Duration: 15 s (0 min 15 s)
- Coordinates: 51.1°S 110.3°E
- Max. width of band: 12 km (7.5 mi)

Times (UTC)
- Greatest eclipse: 5:01:43

References
- Saros: 140 (25 of 71)
- Catalog # (SE5000): 9386

An annular solar eclipse occurred at the Moon's descending node of orbit on Sunday, January 14, 1945, with a magnitude of 0.997. A solar eclipse occurs when the Moon passes between Earth and the Sun, thereby totally or partly obscuring the image of the Sun for a viewer on Earth. An annular solar eclipse occurs when the Moon's apparent diameter is smaller than the Sun's, blocking most of the Sun's light and causing the Sun to look like an annulus (ring). An annular eclipse appears as a partial eclipse over a region of the Earth thousands of kilometres wide. The Moon's apparent diameter was near the average diameter because it occurred 8.3 days after apogee (on January 5, 1945, at 20:40 UTC) and 3.5 days before perigee (on January 17, 1945, at 17:50 UTC).

Annularity was visible from Eastern Cape in South Africa, and northeastern Tasmania Island and Furneaux Group in Australia. A partial eclipse was visible for parts of Southern Africa, Antarctica, Australia, and Oceania.

== Eclipse details ==
Shown below are two tables displaying details about this particular solar eclipse. The first table outlines times at which the Moon's penumbra or umbra attains the specific parameter, and the second table describes various other parameters pertaining to this eclipse.

January 14, 1945 Solar Eclipse Times
Event	Time (UTC)
First Penumbral External Contact	1945 January 14 at 02:22:25.7 UTC
First Umbral External Contact	1945 January 14 at 03:26:59.2 UTC
First Central Line	1945 January 14 at 03:27:37.2 UTC
Greatest Duration	1945 January 14 at 03:27:37.2 UTC
First Umbral Internal Contact	1945 January 14 at 03:28:15.1 UTC
Equatorial Conjunction	1945 January 14 at 04:57:46.0 UTC
Greatest Eclipse	1945 January 14 at 05:01:43.2 UTC
Ecliptic Conjunction	1945 January 14 at 05:07:00.6 UTC
Last Umbral Internal Contact	1945 January 14 at 06:35:16.2 UTC
Last Central Line	1945 January 14 at 06:35:51.4 UTC
Last Umbral External Contact	1945 January 14 at 06:36:26.6 UTC
Last Penumbral External Contact	1945 January 14 at 07:40:56.5 UTC

January 14, 1945 Solar Eclipse Parameters
Parameter	Value
Eclipse Magnitude	0.99704
Eclipse Obscuration	0.99409
Gamma	−0.49366
Sun Right Ascension	19h42m12.3s
Sun Declination	-21°22'08.0"
Sun Semi-Diameter	16'15.6"
Sun Equatorial Horizontal Parallax	08.9"
Moon Right Ascension	19h42m21.5s
Moon Declination	-21°50'56.3"
Moon Semi-Diameter	15'59.0"
Moon Equatorial Horizontal Parallax	0°58'39.7"
ΔT	26.8 s

== Eclipse season ==
This eclipse is part of an eclipse season, a period, roughly every six months, when eclipses occur. Only two (or occasionally three) eclipse seasons occur each year, and each season lasts about 35 days and repeats just short of six months (173 days) later; thus two full eclipse seasons always occur each year. Either two or three eclipses happen each eclipse season. In the sequence below, each eclipse is separated by a fortnight.

Eclipse season of December 1944–January 1945
December 29 Ascending node (full moon)	January 14 Descending node (new moon)
Penumbral lunar eclipse Lunar Saros 114	Annular solar eclipse Solar Saros 140

== Related eclipses ==
=== Eclipses in 1945 ===
- An annular solar eclipse on January 14.
- A partial lunar eclipse on June 25.
- A total solar eclipse on July 9.
- A total lunar eclipse on December 19.

=== Metonic ===
- Preceded by: Solar eclipse of March 27, 1941
- Followed by: Solar eclipse of November 1, 1948

=== Tzolkinex ===
- Preceded by: Solar eclipse of December 2, 1937
- Followed by: Solar eclipse of February 25, 1952

=== Half-Saros ===
- Preceded by: Lunar eclipse of January 8, 1936
- Followed by: Lunar eclipse of January 19, 1954

=== Tritos ===
- Preceded by: Solar eclipse of February 14, 1934
- Followed by: Solar eclipse of December 14, 1955

=== Solar Saros 140 ===
- Preceded by: Solar eclipse of January 3, 1927
- Followed by: Solar eclipse of January 25, 1963

=== Inex ===
- Preceded by: Solar eclipse of February 3, 1916
- Followed by: Solar eclipse of December 24, 1973

=== Triad ===
- Preceded by: Solar eclipse of March 15, 1858
- Followed by: Solar eclipse of November 14, 2031

=== Solar eclipses of 1942–1946 ===
This eclipse is a member of a semester series. An eclipse in a semester series of solar eclipses repeats approximately every 177 days and 4 hours (a semester) at alternating nodes of the Moon's orbit.

The partial solar eclipses on March 16, 1942 and September 10, 1942 occur in the previous lunar year eclipse set, and the partial solar eclipses on May 30, 1946 and November 23, 1946 occur in the next lunar year eclipse set.

Solar eclipse series sets from 1942 to 1946
Ascending node			Descending node		
Saros	Map	Gamma	Saros	Map	Gamma
115	August 12, 1942 Partial	−1.5244	120	February 4, 1943 Total	0.8734
125	August 1, 1943 Annular	−0.8041	130	January 25, 1944 Total	0.2025
135	July 20, 1944 Annular	−0.0314	140	January 14, 1945 Annular	−0.4937
145	July 9, 1945 Total	0.7356	150	January 3, 1946 Partial	−1.2392
155	June 29, 1946 Partial	1.4361			

=== Saros 140 ===
This eclipse is a part of Saros series 140, repeating every 18 years, 11 days, and containing 71 events. The series started with a partial solar eclipse on April 16, 1512. It contains total eclipses from July 21, 1656 through November 9, 1836; hybrid eclipses from November 20, 1854 through December 23, 1908; and annular eclipses from January 3, 1927 through December 7, 2485. The series ends at member 71 as a partial eclipse on June 1, 2774. Its eclipses are tabulated in three columns; every third eclipse in the same column is one exeligmos apart, so they all cast shadows over approximately the same parts of the Earth.

The longest duration of totality was produced by member 11 at 4 minutes, 10 seconds on August 12, 1692, and the longest duration of annularity will be produced by member 53 at 7 minutes, 35 seconds on November 15, 2449. All eclipses in this series occur at the Moon’s descending node of orbit.

Series members 18–39 occur between 1801 and 2200:
18	19	20
October 29, 1818	November 9, 1836	November 20, 1854
21	22	23
November 30, 1872	December 12, 1890	December 23, 1908
24	25	26
January 3, 1927	January 14, 1945	January 25, 1963
27	28	29
February 4, 1981	February 16, 1999	February 26, 2017
30	31	32
March 9, 2035	March 20, 2053	March 31, 2071
33	34	35
April 10, 2089	April 23, 2107	May 3, 2125
36	37	38
May 14, 2143	May 25, 2161	June 5, 2179
39
June 15, 2197

=== Metonic series ===
The metonic series repeats eclipses every 19 years (6939.69 days), lasting about 5 cycles. Eclipses occur in nearly the same calendar date. In addition, the octon subseries repeats 1/5 of that or every 3.8 years (1387.94 days). All eclipses in this table occur at the Moon's descending node.

22 eclipse events between March 27, 1884 and August 20, 1971
March 27–29	January 14	November 1–2	August 20–21	June 8
108	110	112	114	116
March 27, 1884			August 20, 1895	June 8, 1899
118	120	122	124	126
March 29, 1903	January 14, 1907	November 2, 1910	August 21, 1914	June 8, 1918
128	130	132	134	136
March 28, 1922	January 14, 1926	November 1, 1929	August 21, 1933	June 8, 1937
138	140	142	144	146
March 27, 1941	January 14, 1945	November 1, 1948	August 20, 1952	June 8, 1956
148	150	152	154	
March 27, 1960	January 14, 1964	November 2, 1967	August 20, 1971	

=== Tritos series ===
This eclipse is a part of a tritos cycle, repeating at alternating nodes every 135 synodic months (≈ 3986.63 days, or 11 years minus 1 month). Their appearance and longitude are irregular due to a lack of synchronization with the anomalistic month (period of perigee), but groupings of 3 tritos cycles (≈ 33 years minus 3 months) come close (≈ 434.044 anomalistic months), so eclipses are similar in these groupings.

Series members between 1801 and 2200
February 21, 1803 (Saros 127)	January 21, 1814 (Saros 128)	December 20, 1824 (Saros 129)	November 20, 1835 (Saros 130)	October 20, 1846 (Saros 131)
September 18, 1857 (Saros 132)	August 18, 1868 (Saros 133)	July 19, 1879 (Saros 134)	June 17, 1890 (Saros 135)	May 18, 1901 (Saros 136)
April 17, 1912 (Saros 137)	March 17, 1923 (Saros 138)	February 14, 1934 (Saros 139)	January 14, 1945 (Saros 140)	December 14, 1955 (Saros 141)
November 12, 1966 (Saros 142)	October 12, 1977 (Saros 143)	September 11, 1988 (Saros 144)	August 11, 1999 (Saros 145)	July 11, 2010 (Saros 146)
June 10, 2021 (Saros 147)	May 9, 2032 (Saros 148)	April 9, 2043 (Saros 149)	March 9, 2054 (Saros 150)	February 5, 2065 (Saros 151)
January 6, 2076 (Saros 152)	December 6, 2086 (Saros 153)	November 4, 2097 (Saros 154)	October 5, 2108 (Saros 155)	September 5, 2119 (Saros 156)
August 4, 2130 (Saros 157)	July 3, 2141 (Saros 158)	June 3, 2152 (Saros 159)		April 1, 2174 (Saros 161)

=== Inex series ===
This eclipse is a part of the long period inex cycle, repeating at alternating nodes, every 358 synodic months (≈ 10,571.95 days, or 29 years minus 20 days). Their appearance and longitude are irregular due to a lack of synchronization with the anomalistic month (period of perigee). However, groupings of 3 inex cycles (≈ 87 years minus 2 months) comes close (≈ 1,151.02 anomalistic months), so eclipses are similar in these groupings.

Series members between 1801 and 2200
April 3, 1829 (Saros 136)	March 15, 1858 (Saros 137)	February 22, 1887 (Saros 138)
February 3, 1916 (Saros 139)	January 14, 1945 (Saros 140)	December 24, 1973 (Saros 141)
December 4, 2002 (Saros 142)	November 14, 2031 (Saros 143)	October 24, 2060 (Saros 144)
October 4, 2089 (Saros 145)	September 15, 2118 (Saros 146)	August 26, 2147 (Saros 147)
August 4, 2176 (Saros 148)		
