= C/1948 V1 =

Non-periodic comet

C/1948 V1 (Eclipse Comet of 1948)
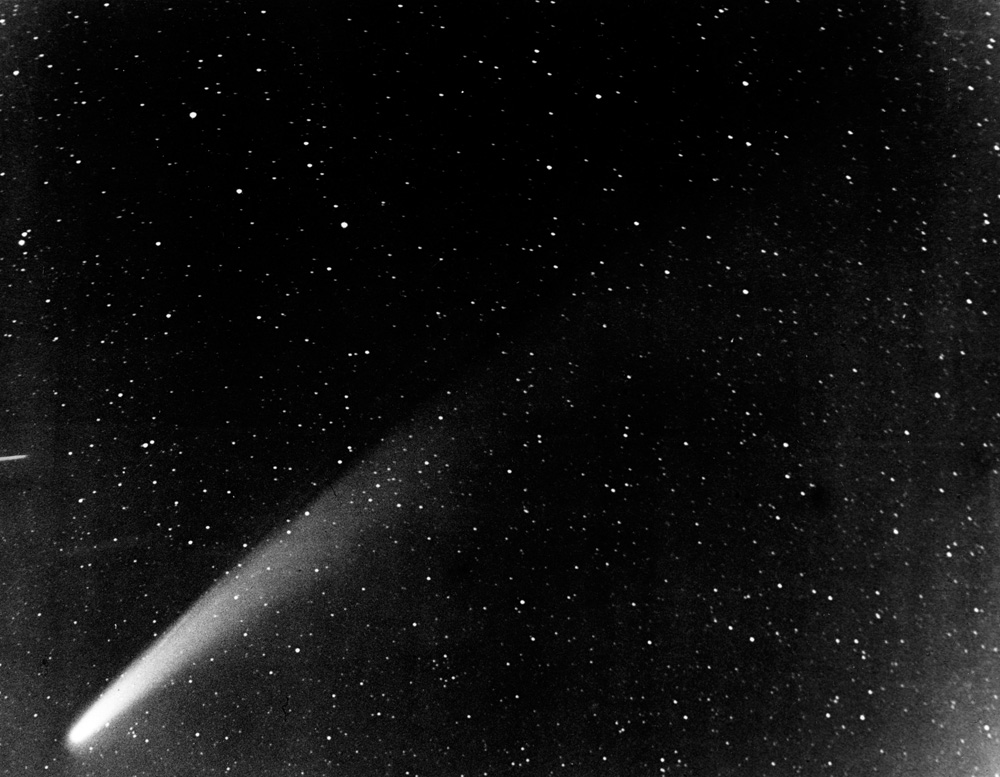
- The Eclipse Comet of 1948 photographed by W. C. Braun from the McDonald Observatory on November 14, 1948

Discovery
- Discovery date: 1 November 1948

Designations
- Alternative designations: 1948 XI, 1948l

Orbital characteristics
- Epoch: 10 January 1949 (JD 2432926.5)
- Observation arc: 137 days
- Number of observations: 17
- Aphelion: 3,149.44 AU
- Perihelion: 0.1354 AU
- Semi-major axis: 1,574.79 AU
- Eccentricity: 0.9999
- Orbital period: 62,494.39 years
- Inclination: 23.116°
- Longitude of ascending node: 211.043°
- Argument of periapsis: 107.249°
- Last perihelion: 27 October 1948
- T_{Jupiter}: 0.423
- Earth MOID: 0.1883 AU
- Jupiter MOID: 1.8182 AU

Physical characteristics
- Mean radius: 1.531 km (0.951 mi) (Note: Calculated mean radius using the formula: $\log_{10}\,(\,R\,)\ =\;0.9 +\;0.13 (\,H\,)$ Where $\,H\,$ is the comet's absolute total magnitude (M1))
- Comet total magnitude (M1): 5.5
- Comet nuclear magnitude (M2): 9.0
- Apparent magnitude: –1.0 (1948 apparition)

The Eclipse Comet of 1948, formally known as C/1948 V1, was an especially bright comet discovered during a solar eclipse on November 1, 1948. Although there have been several comets that have been seen during solar eclipses, the Eclipse Comet of 1948 is perhaps the best-known; it was however, best viewed only from the Southern Hemisphere.

When it was first discovered during totality, it was already quite bright, at magnitude –1.0; as it was near perihelion, this was its peak brightness. Its visibility during morning twilight improved as it receded outward from the Sun; it peaked near zero magnitude, and at one point displayed a tail roughly 30 degrees in length, before falling below naked eye visibility by the end of December.
