= Solar eclipse of November 1, 1948 =

Total eclipse

- Total eclipse
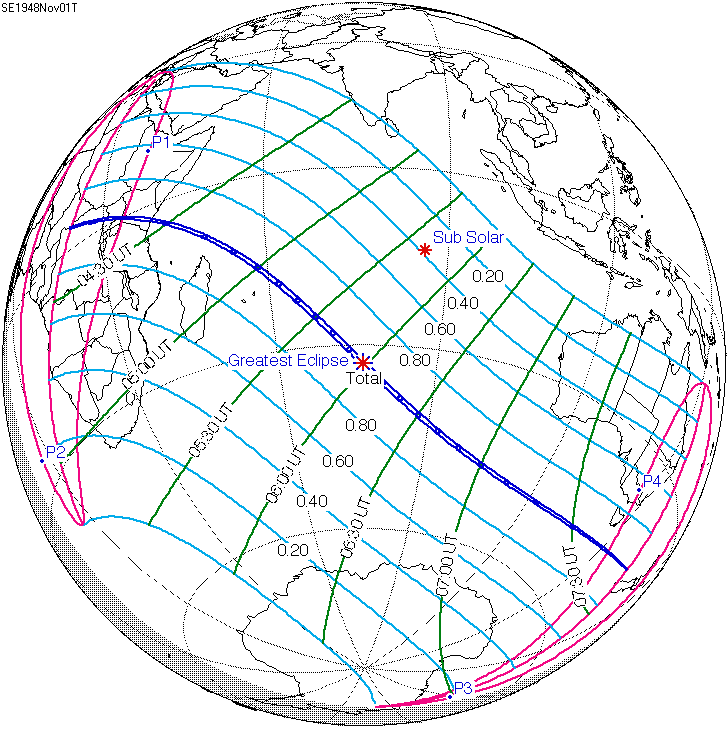
- Map
- Gamma: −0.3517
- Magnitude: 1.0231

Maximum eclipse
- Duration: 116 s (1 min 56 s)
- Coordinates: 33.1°S 76.2°E
- Max. width of band: 84 km (52 mi)

Times (UTC)
- Greatest eclipse: 5:59:18

References
- Saros: 142 (19 of 72)
- Catalog # (SE5000): 9395

A total solar eclipse occurred at the Moon's descending node of orbit on Monday, November 1, 1948, with a magnitude of 1.0231. A solar eclipse occurs when the Moon passes between Earth and the Sun, thereby totally or partly obscuring the image of the Sun for a viewer on Earth. A total solar eclipse occurs when the Moon's apparent diameter is larger than the Sun's, blocking all direct sunlight, turning day into darkness. Totality occurs in a narrow path across Earth's surface, with the partial solar eclipse visible over a surrounding region thousands of kilometres wide. Occurring about 2.4 days after perigee (on October 29, 1948, at 21:20 UTC), the Moon's apparent diameter was larger.

Totality was visible from Belgian Congo (today's DR Congo), Uganda Protectorate (today's Uganda) including the capital city Kampala, British Kenya (today's Kenya) including the capital city Nairobi, British Seychelles (today's Seychelles), and British Mauritius (today's Mauritius). A partial eclipse was visible for parts of East Africa, Southern Africa, Antarctica, and Australia.

During this eclipse, comet C/1948 V1, also known as the Eclipse Comet of 1948, was discovered shining near the Sun.

== Eclipse details ==
Shown below are two tables displaying details about this particular solar eclipse. The first table outlines times at which the Moon's penumbra or umbra attains the specific parameter, and the second table describes various other parameters pertaining to this eclipse.

November 1, 1948 Solar Eclipse Times
Event	Time (UTC)
First Penumbral External Contact	1948 November 01 at 03:19:27.1 UTC
First Umbral External Contact	1948 November 01 at 04:19:32.4 UTC
First Central Line	1948 November 01 at 04:19:46.0 UTC
First Umbral Internal Contact	1948 November 01 at 04:19:59.5 UTC
First Penumbral Internal Contact	1948 November 01 at 05:28:35.7 UTC
Greatest Eclipse	1948 November 01 at 05:59:17.9 UTC
Greatest Duration	1948 November 01 at 06:00:10.8 UTC
Ecliptic Conjunction	1948 November 01 at 06:03:01.1 UTC
Equatorial Conjunction	1948 November 01 at 06:16:14.5 UTC
Last Penumbral Internal Contact	1948 November 01 at 06:29:35.7 UTC
Last Umbral Internal Contact	1948 November 01 at 07:38:28.6 UTC
Last Central Line	1948 November 01 at 07:38:39.8 UTC
Last Umbral External Contact	1948 November 01 at 07:38:51.1 UTC
Last Penumbral External Contact	1948 November 01 at 08:39:07.0 UTC

November 1, 1948 Solar Eclipse Parameters
Parameter	Value
Eclipse Magnitude	1.02312
Eclipse Obscuration	1.04677
Gamma	−0.35172
Sun Right Ascension	14h25m22.0s
Sun Declination	-14°24'53.4"
Sun Semi-Diameter	16'07.1"
Sun Equatorial Horizontal Parallax	08.9"
Moon Right Ascension	14h24m46.3s
Moon Declination	-14°43'55.8"
Moon Semi-Diameter	16'14.2"
Moon Equatorial Horizontal Parallax	0°59'35.3"
ΔT	28.6 s

== Eclipse season ==
This eclipse is part of an eclipse season, a period, roughly every six months, when eclipses occur. Only two (or occasionally three) eclipse seasons occur each year, and each season lasts about 35 days and repeats just short of six months (173 days) later; thus two full eclipse seasons always occur each year. Either two or three eclipses happen each eclipse season. In the sequence below, each eclipse is separated by a fortnight.

Eclipse season of October–November 1948
October 18 Ascending node (full moon)	November 1 Descending node (new moon)
Penumbral lunar eclipse Lunar Saros 116	Total solar eclipse Solar Saros 142

== Related eclipses ==
=== Eclipses in 1948 ===
- A partial lunar eclipse on April 23.
- An annular solar eclipse on May 9.
- A penumbral lunar eclipse on October 18.
- A total solar eclipse on November 1.

=== Metonic ===
- Preceded by: Solar eclipse of January 14, 1945
- Followed by: Solar eclipse of August 20, 1952

=== Tzolkinex ===
- Preceded by: Solar eclipse of September 21, 1941
- Followed by: Solar eclipse of December 14, 1955

=== Half-Saros ===
- Preceded by: Lunar eclipse of October 28, 1939
- Followed by: Lunar eclipse of November 7, 1957

=== Tritos ===
- Preceded by: Solar eclipse of December 2, 1937
- Followed by: Solar eclipse of October 2, 1959

=== Solar Saros 142 ===
- Preceded by: Solar eclipse of October 21, 1930
- Followed by: Solar eclipse of November 12, 1966

=== Inex ===
- Preceded by: Solar eclipse of November 22, 1919
- Followed by: Solar eclipse of October 12, 1977

=== Triad ===
- Preceded by: Solar eclipse of December 31, 1861
- Followed by: Solar eclipse of September 2, 2035

=== Solar eclipses of 1946–1949 ===
This eclipse is a member of a semester series. An eclipse in a semester series of solar eclipses repeats approximately every 177 days and 4 hours (a semester) at alternating nodes of the Moon's orbit.

The partial solar eclipses on January 3, 1946 and June 29, 1946 occur in the previous lunar year eclipse set.

Solar eclipse series sets from 1946 to 1949
Ascending node			Descending node		
Saros	Map	Gamma	Saros	Map	Gamma
117	May 30, 1946 Partial	−1.0711	122	November 23, 1946 Partial	1.105
127	May 20, 1947 Total	−0.3528	132	November 12, 1947 Annular	0.3743
137	May 9, 1948 Annular	0.4133	142	November 1, 1948 Total	−0.3517
147	April 28, 1949 Partial	1.2068	152	October 21, 1949 Partial	−1.027

=== Saros 142 ===
This eclipse is a part of Saros series 142, repeating every 18 years, 11 days, and containing 72 events. The series started with a partial solar eclipse on April 17, 1624. It contains a hybrid eclipse on July 14, 1768, and total eclipses from July 25, 1786 through October 29, 2543. There are no annular eclipses in this set. The series ends at member 72 as a partial eclipse on June 5, 2904. Its eclipses are tabulated in three columns; every third eclipse in the same column is one exeligmos apart, so they all cast shadows over approximately the same parts of the Earth.

The longest duration of totality will be produced by member 38 at 6 minutes, 34 seconds on May 28, 2291. All eclipses in this series occur at the Moon’s descending node of orbit.

Series members 11–32 occur between 1801 and 2200:
11	12	13
August 5, 1804	August 16, 1822	August 27, 1840
14	15	16
September 7, 1858	September 17, 1876	September 29, 1894
17	18	19
October 10, 1912	October 21, 1930	November 1, 1948
20	21	22
November 12, 1966	November 22, 1984	December 4, 2002
23	24	25
December 14, 2020	December 26, 2038	January 5, 2057
26	27	28
January 16, 2075	January 27, 2093	February 8, 2111
29	30	31
February 18, 2129	March 2, 2147	March 12, 2165
32
March 23, 2183

=== Metonic series ===
The metonic series repeats eclipses every 19 years (6939.69 days), lasting about 5 cycles. Eclipses occur in nearly the same calendar date. In addition, the octon subseries repeats 1/5 of that or every 3.8 years (1387.94 days). All eclipses in this table occur at the Moon's descending node.

22 eclipse events between March 27, 1884 and August 20, 1971
March 27–29	January 14	November 1–2	August 20–21	June 8
108	110	112	114	116
March 27, 1884			August 20, 1895	June 8, 1899
118	120	122	124	126
March 29, 1903	January 14, 1907	November 2, 1910	August 21, 1914	June 8, 1918
128	130	132	134	136
March 28, 1922	January 14, 1926	November 1, 1929	August 21, 1933	June 8, 1937
138	140	142	144	146
March 27, 1941	January 14, 1945	November 1, 1948	August 20, 1952	June 8, 1956
148	150	152	154	
March 27, 1960	January 14, 1964	November 2, 1967	August 20, 1971	

=== Tritos series ===
This eclipse is a part of a tritos cycle, repeating at alternating nodes every 135 synodic months (≈ 3986.63 days, or 11 years minus 1 month). Their appearance and longitude are irregular due to a lack of synchronization with the anomalistic month (period of perigee), but groupings of 3 tritos cycles (≈ 33 years minus 3 months) come close (≈ 434.044 anomalistic months), so eclipses are similar in these groupings.

The partial solar eclipses on December 18, 2188 (part of Saros 164) and November 18, 2199 (part of Saros 165) are also a part of this series but are not included in the table below.

Series members between 1801 and 2134
December 10, 1806 (Saros 129)	November 9, 1817 (Saros 130)	October 9, 1828 (Saros 131)	September 7, 1839 (Saros 132)	August 7, 1850 (Saros 133)
July 8, 1861 (Saros 134)	June 6, 1872 (Saros 135)	May 6, 1883 (Saros 136)	April 6, 1894 (Saros 137)	March 6, 1905 (Saros 138)
February 3, 1916 (Saros 139)	January 3, 1927 (Saros 140)	December 2, 1937 (Saros 141)	November 1, 1948 (Saros 142)	October 2, 1959 (Saros 143)
August 31, 1970 (Saros 144)	July 31, 1981 (Saros 145)	June 30, 1992 (Saros 146)	May 31, 2003 (Saros 147)	April 29, 2014 (Saros 148)
March 29, 2025 (Saros 149)	February 27, 2036 (Saros 150)	January 26, 2047 (Saros 151)	December 26, 2057 (Saros 152)	November 24, 2068 (Saros 153)
October 24, 2079 (Saros 154)	September 23, 2090 (Saros 155)	August 24, 2101 (Saros 156)	July 23, 2112 (Saros 157)	June 23, 2123 (Saros 158)
May 23, 2134 (Saros 159)

=== Inex series ===
This eclipse is a part of the long period inex cycle, repeating at alternating nodes, every 358 synodic months (≈ 10,571.95 days, or 29 years minus 20 days). Their appearance and longitude are irregular due to a lack of synchronization with the anomalistic month (period of perigee). However, groupings of 3 inex cycles (≈ 87 years minus 2 months) comes close (≈ 1,151.02 anomalistic months), so eclipses are similar in these groupings.

Series members between 1801 and 2200
February 11, 1804 (Saros 137)	January 20, 1833 (Saros 138)	December 31, 1861 (Saros 139)
December 12, 1890 (Saros 140)	November 22, 1919 (Saros 141)	November 1, 1948 (Saros 142)
October 12, 1977 (Saros 143)	September 22, 2006 (Saros 144)	September 2, 2035 (Saros 145)
August 12, 2064 (Saros 146)	July 23, 2093 (Saros 147)	July 4, 2122 (Saros 148)
June 14, 2151 (Saros 149)	May 24, 2180 (Saros 150)	
