= Solar eclipse of December 2, 1937 =

20th-century annular solar eclipse

- Annular eclipse
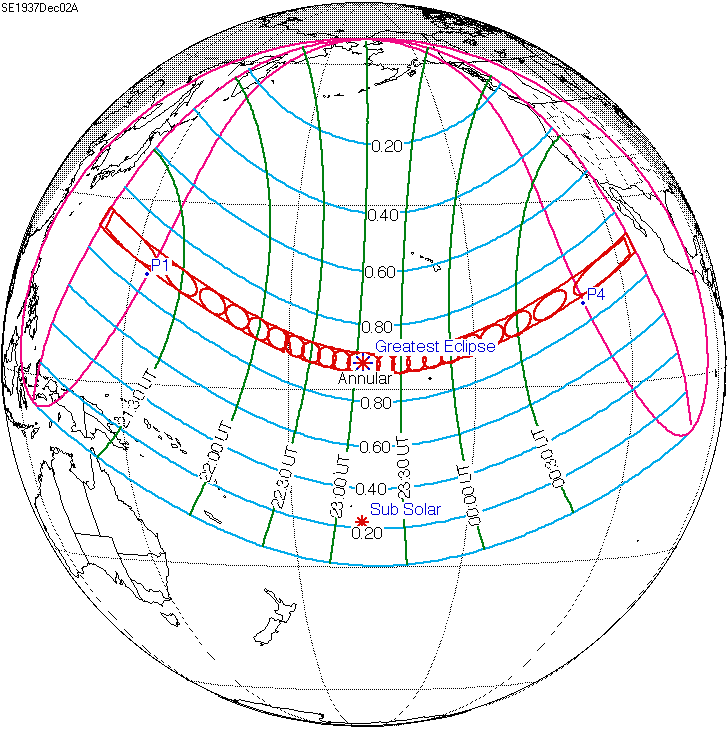
- Map
- Gamma: 0.4389
- Magnitude: 0.9184

Maximum eclipse
- Duration: 720 s (12 min 0 s)
- Coordinates: 4°N 167.8°W
- Max. width of band: 344 km (214 mi)

Times (UTC)
- Greatest eclipse: 23:05:45

References
- Saros: 141 (19 of 70)
- Catalog # (SE5000): 9370

An annular solar eclipse occurred at the Moon's ascending node of orbit between Thursday, December 2 and Friday, December 3, 1937, with a magnitude of 0.9184. A solar eclipse occurs when the Moon passes between Earth and the Sun, thereby totally or partly obscuring the image of the Sun for a viewer on Earth. An annular solar eclipse occurs when the Moon's apparent diameter is smaller than the Sun's, blocking most of the Sun's light and causing the Sun to look like an annulus (ring). An annular eclipse appears as a partial eclipse over a region of the Earth thousands of kilometres wide. Occurring about 18 hours before apogee (on December 3, 1937, at 16:50 UTC), the Moon's apparent diameter was smaller.

The duration of annularity at maximum eclipse (closest to but slightly shorter than the longest duration) was 12 minutes, 0.33 seconds in the Pacific Ocean. It was the longest annular solar eclipse since December 25, 1628, but the Solar eclipse of December 14, 1955 lasted longer.

Annularity was visible from outlying islands in Japan on December 3, including part of Ogasawara Village and South Seas Mandate (the part now belonging to Marshall Islands), and also Teraina and Tabuaeran in the Gilbert and Ellice Islands (the part now belonging to Kiribati), a colony of the United Kingdom, on December 2. (However, time zone of the Line Islands including Teraina and Tabuaeran was changed from UTC−10 to UTC+14 in 1995. The date would be December 3 for all annular eclipse visible from land if observing the present day's time zone.)

A partial eclipse was visible for parts of East Asia, northern Oceania, Hawaii, and western North America. Part of these areas are east of the 180th meridian, seeing the eclipse on December 2, and the rest west of the 180th meridian, seeing the eclipse on December 3.

== Eclipse details ==
Shown below are two tables displaying details about this particular solar eclipse. The first table outlines times at which the Moon's penumbra or umbra attains the specific parameter, and the second table describes various other parameters pertaining to this eclipse.

December 2, 1937 Solar Eclipse Times
Event	Time (UTC)
First Penumbral External Contact	1937 December 2 at 20:05:29.6 UTC
First Umbral External Contact	1937 December 2 at 21:14:57.2 UTC
First Central Line	1937 December 2 at 21:18:43.1 UTC
First Umbral Internal Contact	1937 December 2 at 21:22:30.7 UTC
Equatorial Conjunction	1937 December 2 at 23:03:27.6 UTC
Greatest Eclipse	1937 December 2 at 23:05:45.1 UTC
Greatest Duration	1937 December 2 at 23:07:42.3 UTC
Ecliptic Conjunction	1937 December 2 at 23:11:03.1 UTC
Last Umbral Internal Contact	1937 December 3 at 00:49:00.8 UTC
Last Central Line	1937 December 3 at 00:52:48.8 UTC
Last Umbral External Contact	1937 December 3 at 00:56:35.2 UTC
Last Penumbral External Contact	1937 December 3 at 02:06:02.7 UTC

December 2, 1937 Solar Eclipse Parameters
Parameter	Value
Eclipse Magnitude	0.91842
Eclipse Obscuration	0.84349
Gamma	0.43886
Sun Right Ascension	16h35m02.2s
Sun Declination	-22°00'36.6"
Sun Semi-Diameter	16'13.6"
Sun Equatorial Horizontal Parallax	08.9"
Moon Right Ascension	16h35m06.6s
Moon Declination	-21°37'01.0"
Moon Semi-Diameter	14'42.2"
Moon Equatorial Horizontal Parallax	0°53'57.6"
ΔT	24.0 s

== Eclipse season ==
This eclipse is part of an eclipse season, a period, roughly every six months, when eclipses occur. Only two (or occasionally three) eclipse seasons occur each year, and each season lasts about 35 days and repeats just short of six months (173 days) later; thus two full eclipse seasons always occur each year. Either two or three eclipses happen each eclipse season. In the sequence below, each eclipse is separated by a fortnight.

Eclipse season of November–December 1937
November 18 Descending node (full moon)	December 2 Ascending node (new moon)
Partial lunar eclipse Lunar Saros 115	Annular solar eclipse Solar Saros 141

== Related eclipses ==
=== Eclipses in 1937 ===
- A penumbral lunar eclipse on May 25.
- A total solar eclipse on June 8.
- A partial lunar eclipse on November 18.
- An annular solar eclipse on December 2.

=== Metonic ===
- Preceded by: Solar eclipse of February 14, 1934
- Followed by: Solar eclipse of September 21, 1941

=== Tzolkinex ===
- Preceded by: Solar eclipse of October 21, 1930
- Followed by: Solar eclipse of January 14, 1945

=== Half-Saros ===
- Preceded by: Lunar eclipse of November 27, 1928
- Followed by: Lunar eclipse of December 8, 1946

=== Tritos ===
- Preceded by: Solar eclipse of January 3, 1927
- Followed by: Solar eclipse of November 1, 1948

=== Solar Saros 141 ===
- Preceded by: Solar eclipse of November 22, 1919
- Followed by: Solar eclipse of December 14, 1955

=== Inex ===
- Preceded by: Solar eclipse of December 23, 1908
- Followed by: Solar eclipse of November 12, 1966

=== Triad ===
- Preceded by: Solar eclipse of February 1, 1851
- Followed by: Solar eclipse of October 2, 2024

=== Solar eclipses of 1935–1938 ===
This eclipse is a member of a semester series. An eclipse in a semester series of solar eclipses repeats approximately every 177 days and 4 hours (a semester) at alternating nodes of the Moon's orbit.

The partial solar eclipses on February 3, 1935 and July 30, 1935 occur in the previous lunar year eclipse set.

Solar eclipse series sets from 1935 to 1938
Ascending node			Descending node		
Saros	Map	Gamma	Saros	Map	Gamma
111	January 5, 1935 Partial	−1.5381	116	June 30, 1935 Partial	1.3623
121	December 25, 1935 Annular	−0.9228	126	June 19, 1936 Total	0.5389
131	December 13, 1936 Annular	−0.2493	136 Totality in Kanton Island, Kiribati	June 8, 1937 Total	−0.2253
141	December 2, 1937 Annular	0.4389	146	May 29, 1938 Total	−0.9607
151	November 21, 1938 Partial	1.1077			

=== Saros 141 ===
This eclipse is a part of Saros series 141, repeating every 18 years, 11 days, and containing 70 events. The series started with a partial solar eclipse on May 19, 1613. It contains annular eclipses from August 4, 1739 through October 14, 2640. There are no hybrid or total eclipses in this set. The series ends at member 70 as a partial eclipse on June 13, 2857. Its eclipses are tabulated in three columns; every third eclipse in the same column is one exeligmos apart, so they all cast shadows over approximately the same parts of the Earth.

The longest duration of annularity was produced by member 20 at 12 minutes, 9 seconds on December 14, 1955. All eclipses in this series occur at the Moon’s ascending node of orbit.

Series members 12–33 occur between 1801 and 2200:
12	13	14
September 17, 1811	September 28, 1829	October 9, 1847
15	16	17
October 19, 1865	October 30, 1883	November 11, 1901
18	19	20
November 22, 1919	December 2, 1937	December 14, 1955
21	22	23
December 24, 1973	January 4, 1992	January 15, 2010
24	25	26
January 26, 2028	February 5, 2046	February 17, 2064
27	28	29
February 27, 2082	March 10, 2100	March 22, 2118
30	31	32
April 1, 2136	April 12, 2154	April 23, 2172
33
May 4, 2190

=== Metonic series ===
The metonic series repeats eclipses every 19 years (6939.69 days), lasting about 5 cycles. Eclipses occur in nearly the same calendar date. In addition, the octon subseries repeats 1/5 of that or every 3.8 years (1387.94 days). All eclipses in this table occur at the Moon's ascending node.

22 eclipse events between December 2, 1880 and July 9, 1964
December 2–3	September 20–21	July 9–10	April 26–28	February 13–14
111	113	115	117	119
December 2, 1880		July 9, 1888	April 26, 1892	February 13, 1896
121	123	125	127	129
December 3, 1899	September 21, 1903	July 10, 1907	April 28, 1911	February 14, 1915
131	133	135	137	139
December 3, 1918	September 21, 1922	July 9, 1926	April 28, 1930	February 14, 1934
141	143	145	147	149
December 2, 1937	September 21, 1941	July 9, 1945	April 28, 1949	February 14, 1953
151	153	155		
December 2, 1956	September 20, 1960	July 9, 1964		

=== Tritos series ===
This eclipse is a part of a tritos cycle, repeating at alternating nodes every 135 synodic months (≈ 3986.63 days, or 11 years minus 1 month). Their appearance and longitude are irregular due to a lack of synchronization with the anomalistic month (period of perigee), but groupings of 3 tritos cycles (≈ 33 years minus 3 months) come close (≈ 434.044 anomalistic months), so eclipses are similar in these groupings.

The partial solar eclipses on December 18, 2188 (part of Saros 164) and November 18, 2199 (part of Saros 165) are also a part of this series but are not included in the table below.

Series members between 1801 and 2134
December 10, 1806 (Saros 129)	November 9, 1817 (Saros 130)	October 9, 1828 (Saros 131)	September 7, 1839 (Saros 132)	August 7, 1850 (Saros 133)
July 8, 1861 (Saros 134)	June 6, 1872 (Saros 135)	May 6, 1883 (Saros 136)	April 6, 1894 (Saros 137)	March 6, 1905 (Saros 138)
February 3, 1916 (Saros 139)	January 3, 1927 (Saros 140)	December 2, 1937 (Saros 141)	November 1, 1948 (Saros 142)	October 2, 1959 (Saros 143)
August 31, 1970 (Saros 144)	July 31, 1981 (Saros 145)	June 30, 1992 (Saros 146)	May 31, 2003 (Saros 147)	April 29, 2014 (Saros 148)
March 29, 2025 (Saros 149)	February 27, 2036 (Saros 150)	January 26, 2047 (Saros 151)	December 26, 2057 (Saros 152)	November 24, 2068 (Saros 153)
October 24, 2079 (Saros 154)	September 23, 2090 (Saros 155)	August 24, 2101 (Saros 156)	July 23, 2112 (Saros 157)	June 23, 2123 (Saros 158)
May 23, 2134 (Saros 159)

=== Inex series ===
This eclipse is a part of the long period inex cycle, repeating at alternating nodes, every 358 synodic months (≈ 10,571.95 days, or 29 years minus 20 days). Their appearance and longitude are irregular due to a lack of synchronization with the anomalistic month (period of perigee). However, groupings of 3 inex cycles (≈ 87 years minus 2 months) comes close (≈ 1,151.02 anomalistic months), so eclipses are similar in these groupings.

Series members between 1801 and 2200
February 21, 1822 (Saros 137)	February 1, 1851 (Saros 138)	January 11, 1880 (Saros 139)
December 23, 1908 (Saros 140)	December 2, 1937 (Saros 141)	November 12, 1966 (Saros 142)
October 24, 1995 (Saros 143)	October 2, 2024 (Saros 144)	September 12, 2053 (Saros 145)
August 24, 2082 (Saros 146)	August 4, 2111 (Saros 147)	July 14, 2140 (Saros 148)
June 25, 2169 (Saros 149)	June 4, 2198 (Saros 150)	
