= Solar eclipse of December 24, 1973 =

20th-century annular solar eclipse

- Annular eclipse
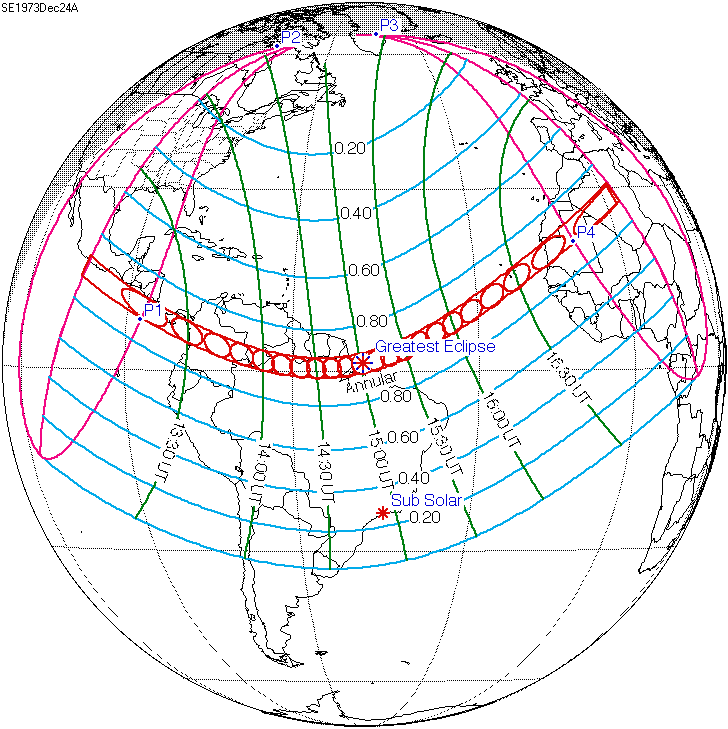
- Map
- Gamma: 0.4171
- Magnitude: 0.9174

Maximum eclipse
- Duration: 722 s (12 min 2 s)
- Coordinates: 1.1°N 48.5°W
- Max. width of band: 345 km (214 mi)

Times (UTC)
- Greatest eclipse: 15:02:44

References
- Saros: 141 (21 of 70)
- Catalog # (SE5000): 9451

An annular solar eclipse occurred at the Moon's ascending node of orbit on Monday, December 24, 1973, with a magnitude of 0.9174. A solar eclipse occurs when the Moon passes between Earth and the Sun, thereby totally or partly obscuring the image of the Sun for a viewer on Earth. An annular solar eclipse occurs when the Moon's apparent diameter is smaller than the Sun's, blocking most of the Sun's light and causing the Sun to look like an annulus (ring). An annular eclipse appears as a partial eclipse over a region of the Earth thousands of kilometres wide. Occurring about 1.25 days before apogee (on December 25, 1973, at 21:30 UTC), the Moon's apparent diameter was smaller.

The duration of annularity at maximum eclipse (closest to but slightly shorter than the longest duration) was 12 minutes, 2.37 seconds in the Atlantic Ocean near the Brazilian coast. It was the longest annular solar eclipse until January 14, 3080, but the Solar eclipse of December 14, 1955 lasted longer.

Annularity was visible from southern Mexico, southwestern Nicaragua, Costa Rica including the capital city San José, Panama, Colombia including the capital city Bogotá, southern Venezuela, Brazil, southern Guyana, southern Dutch Guiana (today's Suriname), southern French Guiana, Portuguese Cape Verde (today's Cape Verde) including the capital city Praia, Mauritania including the capital city Nouakchott, Spanish Sahara (today's Western Sahara), Mali, and Algeria. A partial eclipse was visible for parts of eastern North America, Central America, the Caribbean, northern and central South America, Western Europe, and West Africa.

== Eclipse details ==
Shown below are two tables displaying details about this particular solar eclipse. The first table outlines times at which the Moon's penumbra or umbra attains the specific parameter, and the second table describes various other parameters pertaining to this eclipse.

December 24, 1973 Solar Eclipse Times
Event	Time (UTC)
First Penumbral External Contact	1973 December 24 at 12:01:48.2 UTC
First Umbral External Contact	1973 December 24 at 13:10:43.7 UTC
First Central Line	1973 December 24 at 13:14:29.7 UTC
First Umbral Internal Contact	1973 December 24 at 13:18:17.1 UTC
First Penumbral Internal Contact	1973 December 24 at 14:54:55.3 UTC
Greatest Duration	1973 December 24 at 14:57:39.1 UTC
Greatest Eclipse	1973 December 24 at 15:02:43.5 UTC
Ecliptic Conjunction	1973 December 24 at 15:07:45.5 UTC
Equatorial Conjunction	1973 December 24 at 15:08:46.6 UTC
Last Penumbral Internal Contact	1973 December 24 at 15:10:21.8 UTC
Last Umbral Internal Contact	1973 December 24 at 16:47:05.3 UTC
Last Central Line	1973 December 24 at 16:50:53.5 UTC
Last Umbral External Contact	1973 December 24 at 16:54:40.4 UTC
Last Penumbral External Contact	1973 December 24 at 18:03:38.0 UTC

December 24, 1973 Solar Eclipse Parameters
Parameter	Value
Eclipse Magnitude	0.91745
Eclipse Obscuration	0.84171
Gamma	0.41710
Sun Right Ascension	18h11m38.6s
Sun Declination	-23°24'56.0"
Sun Semi-Diameter	16'15.7"
Sun Equatorial Horizontal Parallax	08.9"
Moon Right Ascension	18h11m26.8s
Moon Declination	-23°02'37.9"
Moon Semi-Diameter	14'43.0"
Moon Equatorial Horizontal Parallax	0°54'00.7"
ΔT	44.5 s

== Eclipse season ==
This eclipse is part of an eclipse season, a period, roughly every six months, when eclipses occur. Only two (or occasionally three) eclipse seasons occur each year, and each season lasts about 35 days and repeats just short of six months (173 days) later; thus two full eclipse seasons always occur each year. Either two or three eclipses happen each eclipse season. In the sequence below, each eclipse is separated by a fortnight.

Eclipse season of December 1973
December 10 Descending node (full moon)	December 24 Ascending node (new moon)
Partial lunar eclipse Lunar Saros 115	Annular solar eclipse Solar Saros 141

== Related eclipses ==
=== Eclipses in 1973 ===
- An annular solar eclipse on January 4.
- A penumbral lunar eclipse on January 18.
- A penumbral lunar eclipse on June 15.
- A total solar eclipse on June 30.
- A penumbral lunar eclipse on July 15.
- A partial lunar eclipse on December 10.
- An annular solar eclipse on December 24.

=== Metonic ===
- Preceded by: Solar eclipse of March 7, 1970
- Followed by: Solar eclipse of October 12, 1977

=== Tzolkinex ===
- Preceded by: Solar eclipse of November 12, 1966
- Followed by: Solar eclipse of February 4, 1981

=== Half-Saros ===
- Preceded by: Lunar eclipse of December 19, 1964
- Followed by: Lunar eclipse of December 30, 1982

=== Tritos ===
- Preceded by: Solar eclipse of January 25, 1963
- Followed by: Solar eclipse of November 22, 1984

=== Solar Saros 141 ===
- Preceded by: Solar eclipse of December 14, 1955
- Followed by: Solar eclipse of January 4, 1992

=== Inex ===
- Preceded by: Solar eclipse of January 14, 1945
- Followed by: Solar eclipse of December 4, 2002

=== Triad ===
- Preceded by: Solar eclipse of February 22, 1887
- Followed by: Solar eclipse of October 24, 2060

=== Solar eclipses of 1971–1974 ===
This eclipse is a member of a semester series. An eclipse in a semester series of solar eclipses repeats approximately every 177 days and 4 hours (a semester) at alternating nodes of the Moon's orbit.

The partial solar eclipses on February 25, 1971 and August 20, 1971 occur in the previous lunar year eclipse set.

Solar eclipse series sets from 1971 to 1974
Descending node			Ascending node		
Saros	Map	Gamma	Saros	Map	Gamma
116	July 22, 1971 Partial	1.513	121	January 16, 1972 Annular	−0.9365
126	July 10, 1972 Total	0.6872	131	January 4, 1973 Annular	−0.2644
136	June 30, 1973 Total	−0.0785	141	December 24, 1973 Annular	0.4171
146	June 20, 1974 Total	−0.8239	151	December 13, 1974 Partial	1.0797

=== Saros 141 ===
This eclipse is a part of Saros series 141, repeating every 18 years, 11 days, and containing 70 events. The series started with a partial solar eclipse on May 19, 1613. It contains annular eclipses from August 4, 1739 through October 14, 2640. There are no hybrid or total eclipses in this set. The series ends at member 70 as a partial eclipse on June 13, 2857. Its eclipses are tabulated in three columns; every third eclipse in the same column is one exeligmos apart, so they all cast shadows over approximately the same parts of the Earth.

The longest duration of annularity was produced by member 20 at 12 minutes, 9 seconds on December 14, 1955. All eclipses in this series occur at the Moon’s ascending node of orbit.

Series members 12–33 occur between 1801 and 2200:
12	13	14
September 17, 1811	September 28, 1829	October 9, 1847
15	16	17
October 19, 1865	October 30, 1883	November 11, 1901
18	19	20
November 22, 1919	December 2, 1937	December 14, 1955
21	22	23
December 24, 1973	January 4, 1992	January 15, 2010
24	25	26
January 26, 2028	February 5, 2046	February 17, 2064
27	28	29
February 27, 2082	March 10, 2100	March 22, 2118
30	31	32
April 1, 2136	April 12, 2154	April 23, 2172
33
May 4, 2190

=== Metonic series ===
The metonic series repeats eclipses every 19 years (6939.69 days), lasting about 5 cycles. Eclipses occur in nearly the same calendar date. In addition, the octon subseries repeats 1/5 of that or every 3.8 years (1387.94 days). All eclipses in this table occur at the Moon's ascending node.

22 eclipse events between December 24, 1916 and July 31, 2000
December 24–25	October 12	July 31–August 1	May 19–20	March 7
111	113	115	117	119
December 24, 1916		July 31, 1924	May 19, 1928	March 7, 1932
121	123	125	127	129
December 25, 1935	October 12, 1939	August 1, 1943	May 20, 1947	March 7, 1951
131	133	135	137	139
December 25, 1954	October 12, 1958	July 31, 1962	May 20, 1966	March 7, 1970
141	143	145	147	149
December 24, 1973	October 12, 1977	July 31, 1981	May 19, 1985	March 7, 1989
151	153	155		
December 24, 1992	October 12, 1996	July 31, 2000		

=== Tritos series ===
This eclipse is a part of a tritos cycle, repeating at alternating nodes every 135 synodic months (≈ 3986.63 days, or 11 years minus 1 month). Their appearance and longitude are irregular due to a lack of synchronization with the anomalistic month (period of perigee), but groupings of 3 tritos cycles (≈ 33 years minus 3 months) come close (≈ 434.044 anomalistic months), so eclipses are similar in these groupings.

Series members between 1801 and 2200
April 4, 1810 (Saros 126)	March 4, 1821 (Saros 127)	February 1, 1832 (Saros 128)	December 31, 1842 (Saros 129)	November 30, 1853 (Saros 130)
October 30, 1864 (Saros 131)	September 29, 1875 (Saros 132)	August 29, 1886 (Saros 133)	July 29, 1897 (Saros 134)	June 28, 1908 (Saros 135)
May 29, 1919 (Saros 136)	April 28, 1930 (Saros 137)	March 27, 1941 (Saros 138)	February 25, 1952 (Saros 139)	January 25, 1963 (Saros 140)
December 24, 1973 (Saros 141)	November 22, 1984 (Saros 142)	October 24, 1995 (Saros 143)	September 22, 2006 (Saros 144)	August 21, 2017 (Saros 145)
July 22, 2028 (Saros 146)	June 21, 2039 (Saros 147)	May 20, 2050 (Saros 148)	April 20, 2061 (Saros 149)	March 19, 2072 (Saros 150)
February 16, 2083 (Saros 151)	January 16, 2094 (Saros 152)	December 17, 2104 (Saros 153)	November 16, 2115 (Saros 154)	October 16, 2126 (Saros 155)
September 15, 2137 (Saros 156)	August 14, 2148 (Saros 157)	July 15, 2159 (Saros 158)	June 14, 2170 (Saros 159)	May 13, 2181 (Saros 160)
April 12, 2192 (Saros 161)

=== Inex series ===
This eclipse is a part of the long period inex cycle, repeating at alternating nodes, every 358 synodic months (≈ 10,571.95 days, or 29 years minus 20 days). Their appearance and longitude are irregular due to a lack of synchronization with the anomalistic month (period of perigee). However, groupings of 3 inex cycles (≈ 87 years minus 2 months) comes close (≈ 1,151.02 anomalistic months), so eclipses are similar in these groupings.

Series members between 1801 and 2200
April 3, 1829 (Saros 136)	March 15, 1858 (Saros 137)	February 22, 1887 (Saros 138)
February 3, 1916 (Saros 139)	January 14, 1945 (Saros 140)	December 24, 1973 (Saros 141)
December 4, 2002 (Saros 142)	November 14, 2031 (Saros 143)	October 24, 2060 (Saros 144)
October 4, 2089 (Saros 145)	September 15, 2118 (Saros 146)	August 26, 2147 (Saros 147)
August 4, 2176 (Saros 148)		
