= Solar eclipse of October 21, 1930 =

Total eclipse

- Total eclipse
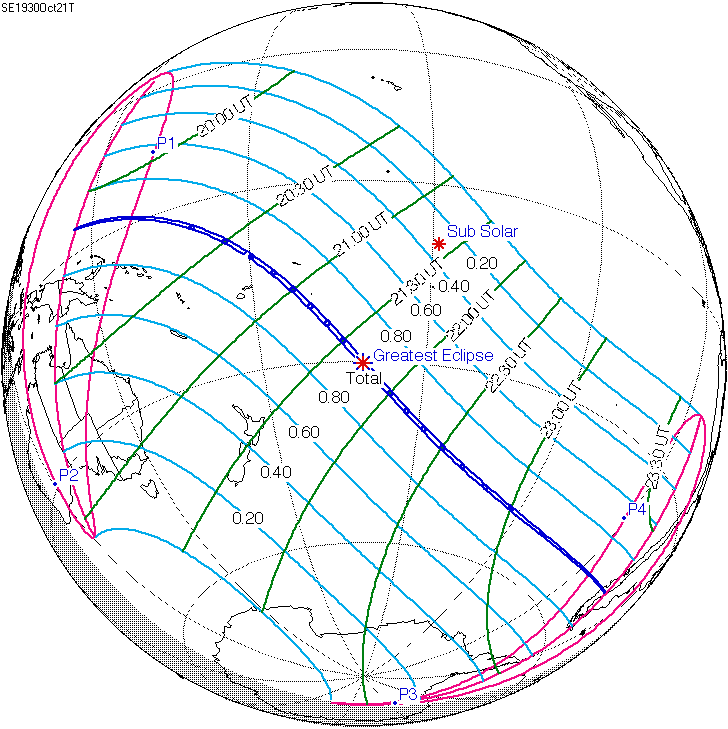
- Map
- Gamma: −0.3804
- Magnitude: 1.023

Maximum eclipse
- Duration: 115 s (1 min 55 s)
- Coordinates: 30.5°S 161.1°W
- Max. width of band: 84 km (52 mi)

Times (UTC)
- Greatest eclipse: 21:43:53

References
- Saros: 142 (18 of 72)
- Catalog # (SE5000): 9352

A total solar eclipse occurred at the Moon's descending node of orbit between Tuesday, October 21 and Wednesday, October 22, 1930, with a magnitude of 1.023. A solar eclipse occurs when the Moon passes between Earth and the Sun, thereby totally or partly obscuring the image of the Sun for a viewer on Earth. A total solar eclipse occurs when the Moon's apparent diameter is larger than the Sun's, blocking all direct sunlight, turning day into darkness. Totality occurs in a narrow path across Earth's surface, with the partial solar eclipse visible over a surrounding region thousands of kilometres wide. Occurring about 2.6 days after perigee (on October 19, 1930, at 7:40 UTC), the Moon's apparent diameter was larger.

Totality was visible from Niuafoʻou in Tonga, Chile, and a tiny part of Santa Cruz Province, Argentina. A partial eclipse was visible for parts of Australia, Oceania, Antarctica, and southern South America.

== Eclipse details ==
Shown below are two tables displaying details about this particular solar eclipse. The first table outlines times at which the Moon's penumbra or umbra attains the specific parameter, and the second table describes various other parameters pertaining to this eclipse.

October 21, 1930 Solar Eclipse Times
| Event | Time (UTC) |
|---|---|
| First Penumbral External Contact | 1930 October 21 at 19:04:22.4 UTC |
| First Umbral External Contact | 1930 October 21 at 20:05:03.7 UTC |
| First Central Line | 1930 October 21 at 20:05:17.8 UTC |
| First Umbral Internal Contact | 1930 October 21 at 20:05:31.9 UTC |
| First Penumbral Internal Contact | 1930 October 21 at 21:17:17.4 UTC |
| Greatest Eclipse | 1930 October 21 at 21:43:53.4 UTC |
| Greatest Duration | 1930 October 21 at 21:44:03.4 UTC |
| Ecliptic Conjunction | 1930 October 21 at 21:47:55.4 UTC |
| Equatorial Conjunction | 1930 October 21 at 22:04:15.8 UTC |
| Last Penumbral Internal Contact | 1930 October 21 at 22:10:00.4 UTC |
| Last Umbral Internal Contact | 1930 October 21 at 23:22:05.3 UTC |
| Last Central Line | 1930 October 21 at 23:22:17.0 UTC |
| Last Umbral External Contact | 1930 October 21 at 23:22:28.7 UTC |
| Last Penumbral External Contact | 1930 October 22 at 00:23:21.5 UTC |

October 21, 1930 Solar Eclipse Parameters
| Parameter | Value |
|---|---|
| Eclipse Magnitude | 1.02304 |
| Eclipse Obscuration | 1.04660 |
| Gamma | −0.38038 |
| Sun Right Ascension | 13h43m08.4s |
| Sun Declination | -10°41'09.2" |
| Sun Semi-Diameter | 16'04.3" |
| Sun Equatorial Horizontal Parallax | 08.8" |
| Moon Right Ascension | 13h42m27.1s |
| Moon Declination | -11°01'17.9" |
| Moon Semi-Diameter | 16'11.5" |
| Moon Equatorial Horizontal Parallax | 0°59'25.5" |
| ΔT | 24.0 s |

== Eclipse season ==
This eclipse is part of an eclipse season, a period, roughly every six months, when eclipses occur. Only two (or occasionally three) eclipse seasons occur each year, and each season lasts about 35 days and repeats just short of six months (173 days) later; thus two full eclipse seasons always occur each year. Either two or three eclipses happen each eclipse season. In the sequence below, each eclipse is separated by a fortnight.

Eclipse season of October 1930
| October 7 Ascending node (full moon) | October 21 Descending node (new moon) |
|---|---|
| Partial lunar eclipse Lunar Saros 116 | Total solar eclipse Solar Saros 142 |

== Related eclipses ==
=== Eclipses in 1930 ===
- A partial lunar eclipse on April 13.
- A hybrid solar eclipse on April 28.
- A partial lunar eclipse on October 7.
- A total solar eclipse on October 21.

=== Metonic ===
- Preceded by: Solar eclipse of January 3, 1927
- Followed by: Solar eclipse of August 10, 1934

=== Tzolkinex ===
- Preceded by: Solar eclipse of September 10, 1923
- Followed by: Solar eclipse of December 2, 1937

=== Half-Saros ===
- Preceded by: Lunar eclipse of October 16, 1921
- Followed by: Lunar eclipse of October 28, 1939

=== Tritos ===
- Preceded by: Solar eclipse of November 22, 1919
- Followed by: Solar eclipse of September 21, 1941

=== Solar Saros 142 ===
- Preceded by: Solar eclipse of October 10, 1912
- Followed by: Solar eclipse of November 1, 1948

=== Inex ===
- Preceded by: Solar eclipse of November 11, 1901
- Followed by: Solar eclipse of October 2, 1959

=== Triad ===
- Preceded by: Solar eclipse of December 21, 1843
- Followed by: Solar eclipse of August 21, 2017

=== Solar eclipses of 1928–1931 ===
This eclipse is a member of a semester series. An eclipse in a semester series of solar eclipses repeats approximately every 177 days and 4 hours (a semester) at alternating nodes of the Moon's orbit.

The partial solar eclipse on June 17, 1928 occurs in the previous lunar year eclipse set, and the partial solar eclipse on September 12, 1931 occurs in the next lunar year eclipse set.

Solar eclipse series sets from 1928 to 1931
| Ascending node | | | Descending node | | |
| Saros | Map | Gamma | Saros | Map | Gamma |
| 117 | May 19, 1928 Total (non-central) | 1.0048 | 122 | November 12, 1928 Partial | 1.0861 |
| 127 | May 9, 1929 Total | −0.2887 | 132 | November 1, 1929 Annular | 0.3514 |
| 137 | April 28, 1930 Hybrid | 0.473 | 142 | October 21, 1930 Total | −0.3804 |
| 147 | April 18, 1931 Partial | 1.2643 | 152 | October 11, 1931 Partial | −1.0607 |

=== Saros 142 ===
This eclipse is a part of Saros series 142, repeating every 18 years, 11 days, and containing 72 events. The series started with a partial solar eclipse on April 17, 1624. It contains a hybrid eclipse on July 14, 1768, and total eclipses from July 25, 1786 through October 29, 2543. There are no annular eclipses in this set. The series ends at member 72 as a partial eclipse on June 5, 2904. Its eclipses are tabulated in three columns; every third eclipse in the same column is one exeligmos apart, so they all cast shadows over approximately the same parts of the Earth.

The longest duration of totality will be produced by member 38 at 6 minutes, 34 seconds on May 28, 2291. All eclipses in this series occur at the Moon’s descending node of orbit.

Series members 11–32 occur between 1801 and 2200:
| 11 | 12 | 13 |
|---|---|---|
| August 5, 1804 | August 16, 1822 | August 27, 1840 |
| 14 | 15 | 16 |
| September 7, 1858 | September 17, 1876 | September 29, 1894 |
| 17 | 18 | 19 |
| October 10, 1912 | October 21, 1930 | November 1, 1948 |
| 20 | 21 | 22 |
| November 12, 1966 | November 22, 1984 | December 4, 2002 |
| 23 | 24 | 25 |
| December 14, 2020 | December 26, 2038 | January 5, 2057 |
| 26 | 27 | 28 |
| January 16, 2075 | January 27, 2093 | February 8, 2111 |
| 29 | 30 | 31 |
| February 18, 2129 | March 2, 2147 | March 12, 2165 |
32
March 23, 2183

=== Metonic series ===
The metonic series repeats eclipses every 19 years (6939.69 days), lasting about 5 cycles. Eclipses occur in nearly the same calendar date. In addition, the octon subseries repeats 1/5 of that or every 3.8 years (1387.94 days). All eclipses in this table occur at the Moon's descending node.

22 eclipse events between March 16, 1866 and August 9, 1953
| March 16–17 | January 1–3 | October 20–22 | August 9–10 | May 27–29 |
| 108 | 110 | 112 | 114 | 116 |
|---|---|---|---|---|
| March 16, 1866 | | | August 9, 1877 | May 27, 1881 |
| 118 | 120 | 122 | 124 | 126 |
| March 16, 1885 | January 1, 1889 | October 20, 1892 | August 9, 1896 | May 28, 1900 |
| 128 | 130 | 132 | 134 | 136 |
| March 17, 1904 | January 3, 1908 | October 22, 1911 | August 10, 1915 | May 29, 1919 |
| 138 | 140 | 142 | 144 | 146 |
| March 17, 1923 | January 3, 1927 | October 21, 1930 | August 10, 1934 | May 29, 1938 |
| 148 | 150 | 152 | 154 | |
| March 16, 1942 | January 3, 1946 | October 21, 1949 | August 9, 1953 | |

=== Tritos series ===
This eclipse is a part of a tritos cycle, repeating at alternating nodes every 135 synodic months (≈ 3986.63 days, or 11 years minus 1 month). Their appearance and longitude are irregular due to a lack of synchronization with the anomalistic month (period of perigee), but groupings of 3 tritos cycles (≈ 33 years minus 3 months) come close (≈ 434.044 anomalistic months), so eclipses are similar in these groupings.

The partial solar eclipses on December 7, 2170 (part of Saros 164) and November 7, 2181 (part of Saros 165) are also a part of this series but are not included in the table below.

Series members between 1801 and 2105
| September 28, 1810 (Saros 131) | August 27, 1821 (Saros 132) | July 27, 1832 (Saros 133) | June 27, 1843 (Saros 134) | May 26, 1854 (Saros 135) |
| April 25, 1865 (Saros 136) | March 25, 1876 (Saros 137) | February 22, 1887 (Saros 138) | January 22, 1898 (Saros 139) | December 23, 1908 (Saros 140) |
| November 22, 1919 (Saros 141) | October 21, 1930 (Saros 142) | September 21, 1941 (Saros 143) | August 20, 1952 (Saros 144) | July 20, 1963 (Saros 145) |
| June 20, 1974 (Saros 146) | May 19, 1985 (Saros 147) | April 17, 1996 (Saros 148) | March 19, 2007 (Saros 149) | February 15, 2018 (Saros 150) |
| January 14, 2029 (Saros 151) | December 15, 2039 (Saros 152) | November 14, 2050 (Saros 153) | October 13, 2061 (Saros 154) | September 12, 2072 (Saros 155) |
| August 13, 2083 (Saros 156) | July 12, 2094 (Saros 157) | June 12, 2105 (Saros 158) | | |

=== Inex series ===
This eclipse is a part of the long period inex cycle, repeating at alternating nodes, every 358 synodic months (≈ 10,571.95 days, or 29 years minus 20 days). Their appearance and longitude are irregular due to a lack of synchronization with the anomalistic month (period of perigee). However, groupings of 3 inex cycles (≈ 87 years minus 2 months) comes close (≈ 1,151.02 anomalistic months), so eclipses are similar in these groupings.

Series members between 1801 and 2200
| January 10, 1815 (Saros 138) | December 21, 1843 (Saros 139) | November 30, 1872 (Saros 140) |
| November 11, 1901 (Saros 141) | October 21, 1930 (Saros 142) | October 2, 1959 (Saros 143) |
| September 11, 1988 (Saros 144) | August 21, 2017 (Saros 145) | August 2, 2046 (Saros 146) |
| July 13, 2075 (Saros 147) | June 22, 2104 (Saros 148) | June 3, 2133 (Saros 149) |
| May 14, 2162 (Saros 150) | April 23, 2191 (Saros 151) | |
