= Solar eclipse of February 17, 2064 =

Future annular solar eclipse

- Annular eclipse
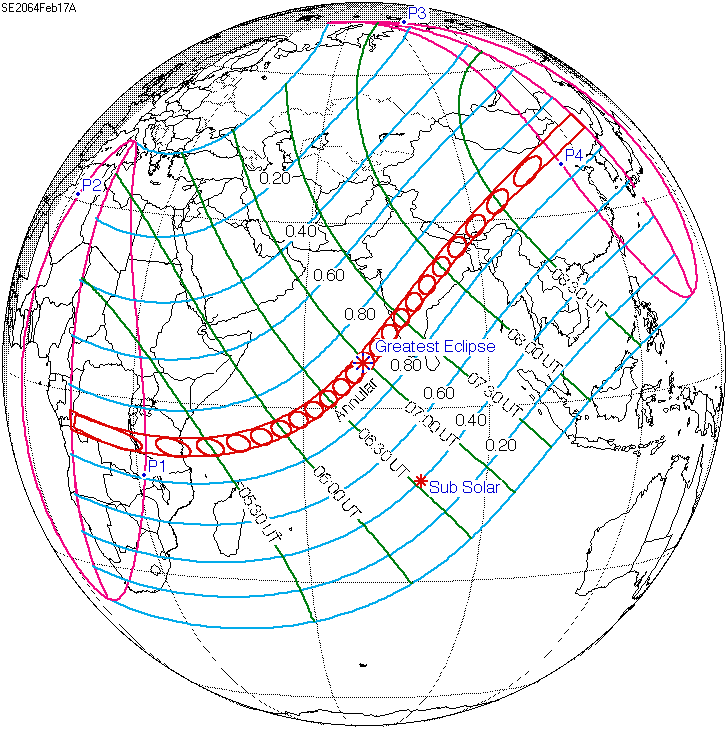
- Map
- Gamma: 0.3597
- Magnitude: 0.9262

Maximum eclipse
- Duration: 536 s (8 min 56 s)
- Coordinates: 7°N 69.7°E
- Max. width of band: 295 km (183 mi)

Times (UTC)
- Greatest eclipse: 7:00:23

References
- Saros: 141 (26 of 70)
- Catalog # (SE5000): 9650

An annular solar eclipse will occur at the Moon's ascending node of orbit on Sunday, February 17, 2064, with a magnitude of 0.9262. A solar eclipse occurs when the Moon passes between Earth and the Sun, thereby totally or partly obscuring the image of the Sun for a viewer on Earth. An annular solar eclipse occurs when the Moon's apparent diameter is smaller than the Sun's, blocking most of the Sun's light and causing the Sun to look like an annulus (ring). An annular eclipse appears as a partial eclipse over a region of the Earth thousands of kilometres wide. Occurring about 2.5 days before apogee (on February 15, 2064, at 18:40 UTC), the Moon's apparent diameter will be smaller.

The path of annularity will be visible from parts of southeastern Congo, northern Angola, the Democratic Republic of the Congo, extreme northern Zambia, Tanzania, the Seychelles, India, Nepal, northwestern Bangladesh, Bhutan, and China. A partial solar eclipse will also be visible for most of Africa and Asia.

== Eclipse details ==
Shown below are two tables displaying details about this particular solar eclipse. The first table outlines times at which the Moon's penumbra or umbra attains the specific parameter, and the second table describes various other parameters pertaining to this eclipse.

February 17, 2064 Solar Eclipse Times
| Event | Time (UTC) |
|---|---|
| First Penumbral External Contact | 2064 February 17 at 03:59:12.4 UTC |
| First Umbral External Contact | 2064 February 17 at 05:06:37.9 UTC |
| First Central Line | 2064 February 17 at 05:09:55.6 UTC |
| First Umbral Internal Contact | 2064 February 17 at 05:13:14.1 UTC |
| First Penumbral Internal Contact | 2064 February 17 at 06:33:12.1 UTC |
| Greatest Duration | 2064 February 17 at 06:44:39.0 UTC |
| Greatest Eclipse | 2064 February 17 at 07:00:23.3 UTC |
| Ecliptic Conjunction | 2064 February 17 at 07:04:41.9 UTC |
| Equatorial Conjunction | 2064 February 17 at 07:21:11.6 UTC |
| Last Penumbral Internal Contact | 2064 February 17 at 07:27:03.5 UTC |
| Last Umbral Internal Contact | 2064 February 17 at 08:47:18.3 UTC |
| Last Central Line | 2064 February 17 at 08:50:38.5 UTC |
| Last Umbral External Contact | 2064 February 17 at 08:53:57.9 UTC |
| Last Penumbral External Contact | 2064 February 17 at 10:01:29.1 UTC |

February 17, 2064 Solar Eclipse Parameters
| Parameter | Value |
|---|---|
| Eclipse Magnitude | 0.92624 |
| Eclipse Obscuration | 0.85792 |
| Gamma | 0.35965 |
| Sun Right Ascension | 22h02m13.8s |
| Sun Declination | -12°01'37.5" |
| Sun Semi-Diameter | 16'11.3" |
| Sun Equatorial Horizontal Parallax | 08.9" |
| Moon Right Ascension | 22h01m38.9s |
| Moon Declination | -11°44'08.3" |
| Moon Semi-Diameter | 14'47.1" |
| Moon Equatorial Horizontal Parallax | 0°54'15.6" |
| ΔT | 93.2 s |

== Eclipse season ==
This eclipse is part of an eclipse season, a period, roughly every six months, when eclipses occur. Only two (or occasionally three) eclipse seasons occur each year, and each season lasts about 35 days and repeats just short of six months (173 days) later; thus two full eclipse seasons always occur each year. Either two or three eclipses happen each eclipse season. In the sequence below, each eclipse is separated by a fortnight.

Eclipse season of February 2064
| February 2 Descending node (full moon) | February 17 Ascending node (new moon) |
|---|---|
| Partial lunar eclipse Lunar Saros 115 | Annular solar eclipse Solar Saros 141 |

== Related eclipses ==
=== Eclipses in 2064 ===
- A partial lunar eclipse on February 2.
- An annular solar eclipse on February 17.
- A partial lunar eclipse on July 28.
- A total solar eclipse on August 12.

=== Metonic ===
- Preceded by: Solar eclipse of April 30, 2060
- Followed by: Solar eclipse of December 6, 2067

=== Tzolkinex ===
- Preceded by: Solar eclipse of January 5, 2057
- Followed by: Solar eclipse of March 31, 2071

=== Half-Saros ===
- Preceded by: Lunar eclipse of February 11, 2055
- Followed by: Lunar eclipse of February 22, 2073

=== Tritos ===
- Preceded by: Solar eclipse of March 20, 2053
- Followed by: Solar eclipse of January 16, 2075

=== Solar Saros 141 ===
- Preceded by: Solar eclipse of February 5, 2046
- Followed by: Solar eclipse of February 27, 2082

=== Inex ===
- Preceded by: Solar eclipse of March 9, 2035
- Followed by: Solar eclipse of January 27, 2093

=== Triad ===
- Preceded by: Solar eclipse of April 18, 1977
- Followed by: Solar eclipse of December 19, 2150

=== Solar eclipses of 2062–2065 ===
This eclipse is a member of a semester series. An eclipse in a semester series of solar eclipses repeats approximately every 177 days and 4 hours (a semester) at alternating nodes of the Moon's orbit.

The partial solar eclipses on July 3, 2065 and December 27, 2065 occur in the next lunar year eclipse set.

Solar eclipse series sets from 2062 to 2065
| Ascending node | | | Descending node | | |
| Saros | Map | Gamma | Saros | Map | Gamma |
| 121 | March 11, 2062 Partial | −1.0238 | 126 | September 3, 2062 Partial | 1.0191 |
| 131 | February 28, 2063 Annular | −0.336 | 136 | August 24, 2063 Total | 0.2771 |
| 141 | February 17, 2064 Annular | 0.3597 | 146 | August 12, 2064 Total | −0.4652 |
| 151 | February 5, 2065 Partial | 1.0336 | 156 | August 2, 2065 Partial | −1.2759 |

=== Saros 141 ===
This eclipse is a part of Saros series 141, repeating every 18 years, 11 days, and containing 70 events. The series started with a partial solar eclipse on May 19, 1613. It contains annular eclipses from August 4, 1739 through October 14, 2640. There are no hybrid or total eclipses in this set. The series ends at member 70 as a partial eclipse on June 13, 2857. Its eclipses are tabulated in three columns; every third eclipse in the same column is one exeligmos apart, so they all cast shadows over approximately the same parts of the Earth.

The longest duration of annularity was produced by member 20 at 12 minutes, 9 seconds on December 14, 1955. All eclipses in this series occur at the Moon’s ascending node of orbit.

Series members 12–33 occur between 1801 and 2200:
| 12 | 13 | 14 |
|---|---|---|
| September 17, 1811 | September 28, 1829 | October 9, 1847 |
| 15 | 16 | 17 |
| October 19, 1865 | October 30, 1883 | November 11, 1901 |
| 18 | 19 | 20 |
| November 22, 1919 | December 2, 1937 | December 14, 1955 |
| 21 | 22 | 23 |
| December 24, 1973 | January 4, 1992 | January 15, 2010 |
| 24 | 25 | 26 |
| January 26, 2028 | February 5, 2046 | February 17, 2064 |
| 27 | 28 | 29 |
| February 27, 2082 | March 10, 2100 | March 22, 2118 |
| 30 | 31 | 32 |
| April 1, 2136 | April 12, 2154 | April 23, 2172 |
33
May 4, 2190

=== Metonic series ===
The metonic series repeats eclipses every 19 years (6939.69 days), lasting about 5 cycles. Eclipses occur in nearly the same calendar date. In addition, the octon subseries repeats 1/5 of that or every 3.8 years (1387.94 days). All eclipses in this table occur at the Moon's ascending node.

21 eclipse events between July 13, 2018 and July 12, 2094
| July 12–13 | April 30–May 1 | February 16–17 | December 5–6 | September 22–23 |
| 117 | 119 | 121 | 123 | 125 |
|---|---|---|---|---|
| July 13, 2018 | April 30, 2022 | February 17, 2026 | December 5, 2029 | September 23, 2033 |
| 127 | 129 | 131 | 133 | 135 |
| July 13, 2037 | April 30, 2041 | February 16, 2045 | December 5, 2048 | September 22, 2052 |
| 137 | 139 | 141 | 143 | 145 |
| July 12, 2056 | April 30, 2060 | February 17, 2064 | December 6, 2067 | September 23, 2071 |
| 147 | 149 | 151 | 153 | 155 |
| July 13, 2075 | May 1, 2079 | February 16, 2083 | December 6, 2086 | September 23, 2090 |
157
July 12, 2094

=== Tritos series ===
This eclipse is a part of a tritos cycle, repeating at alternating nodes every 135 synodic months (≈ 3986.63 days, or 11 years minus 1 month). Their appearance and longitude are irregular due to a lack of synchronization with the anomalistic month (period of perigee), but groupings of 3 tritos cycles (≈ 33 years minus 3 months) come close (≈ 434.044 anomalistic months), so eclipses are similar in these groupings.

Series members between 1801 and 2200
| March 4, 1802 (Saros 117) | February 1, 1813 (Saros 118) | January 1, 1824 (Saros 119) | November 30, 1834 (Saros 120) | October 30, 1845 (Saros 121) |
| September 29, 1856 (Saros 122) | August 29, 1867 (Saros 123) | July 29, 1878 (Saros 124) | June 28, 1889 (Saros 125) | May 28, 1900 (Saros 126) |
| April 28, 1911 (Saros 127) | March 28, 1922 (Saros 128) | February 24, 1933 (Saros 129) | January 25, 1944 (Saros 130) | December 25, 1954 (Saros 131) |
| November 23, 1965 (Saros 132) | October 23, 1976 (Saros 133) | September 23, 1987 (Saros 134) | August 22, 1998 (Saros 135) | July 22, 2009 (Saros 136) |
| June 21, 2020 (Saros 137) | May 21, 2031 (Saros 138) | April 20, 2042 (Saros 139) | March 20, 2053 (Saros 140) | February 17, 2064 (Saros 141) |
| January 16, 2075 (Saros 142) | December 16, 2085 (Saros 143) | November 15, 2096 (Saros 144) | October 16, 2107 (Saros 145) | September 15, 2118 (Saros 146) |
| August 15, 2129 (Saros 147) | July 14, 2140 (Saros 148) | June 14, 2151 (Saros 149) | May 14, 2162 (Saros 150) | April 12, 2173 (Saros 151) |
| March 12, 2184 (Saros 152) | February 10, 2195 (Saros 153) | | | |

=== Inex series ===
This eclipse is a part of the long period inex cycle, repeating at alternating nodes, every 358 synodic months (≈ 10,571.95 days, or 29 years minus 20 days). Their appearance and longitude are irregular due to a lack of synchronization with the anomalistic month (period of perigee). However, groupings of 3 inex cycles (≈ 87 years minus 2 months) comes close (≈ 1,151.02 anomalistic months), so eclipses are similar in these groupings.

Series members between 1801 and 2200
| August 17, 1803 (Saros 132) | July 27, 1832 (Saros 133) | July 8, 1861 (Saros 134) |
| June 17, 1890 (Saros 135) | May 29, 1919 (Saros 136) | May 9, 1948 (Saros 137) |
| April 18, 1977 (Saros 138) | March 29, 2006 (Saros 139) | March 9, 2035 (Saros 140) |
| February 17, 2064 (Saros 141) | January 27, 2093 (Saros 142) | January 8, 2122 (Saros 143) |
| December 19, 2150 (Saros 144) | November 28, 2179 (Saros 145) | |
