= Solar eclipse of August 12, 2064 =

Total eclipse

- Total eclipse
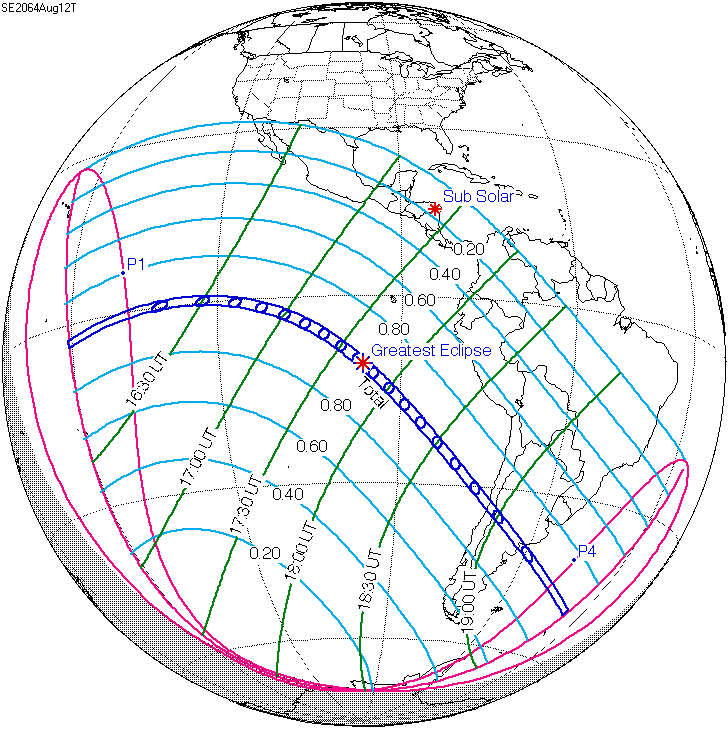
- Map
- Gamma: −0.4652
- Magnitude: 1.0495

Maximum eclipse
- Duration: 268 s (4 min 28 s)
- Coordinates: 10.9°S 96°W
- Max. width of band: 184 km (114 mi)

Times (UTC)
- Greatest eclipse: 17:46:06

References
- Saros: 146 (30 of 76)
- Catalog # (SE5000): 9651

A total solar eclipse will occur at the Moon's descending node of orbit on Tuesday, August 12, 2064, with a magnitude of 1.0495. A solar eclipse occurs when the Moon passes between Earth and the Sun, thereby totally or partly obscuring the image of the Sun for a viewer on Earth. A total solar eclipse occurs when the Moon's apparent diameter is larger than the Sun's, blocking all direct sunlight, turning day into darkness. Totality occurs in a narrow path across Earth's surface, with the partial solar eclipse visible over a surrounding region thousands of kilometres wide. Occurring about 2.2 days before perigee (on August 14, 2064, at 21:30 UTC), the Moon's apparent diameter will be larger.

The path of totality will be visible from parts of Chile and Argentina. A partial solar eclipse will also be visible for parts of eastern Oceania, Mexico, Central America, South America, and Antarctica. This eclipse will pass through the Chilean cities of Valparaíso and the capital Santiago.

== Eclipse details ==
Shown below are two tables displaying details about this particular solar eclipse. The first table outlines times at which the Moon's penumbra or umbra attains the specific parameter, and the second table describes various other parameters pertaining to this eclipse.

August 12, 2064 Solar Eclipse Times
Event	Time (UTC)
First Penumbral External Contact	2064 August 12 at 15:11:35.0 UTC
First Umbral External Contact	2064 August 12 at 16:11:44.1 UTC
First Central Line	2064 August 12 at 16:12:46.2 UTC
First Umbral Internal Contact	2064 August 12 at 16:13:48.4 UTC
Greatest Duration	2064 August 12 at 17:42:17.7 UTC
Greatest Eclipse	2064 August 12 at 17:46:06.3 UTC
Ecliptic Conjunction	2064 August 12 at 17:50:55.5 UTC
Equatorial Conjunction	2064 August 12 at 18:08:08.1 UTC
Last Umbral Internal Contact	2064 August 12 at 19:18:07.7 UTC
Last Central Line	2064 August 12 at 19:19:12.1 UTC
Last Umbral External Contact	2064 August 12 at 19:20:16.3 UTC
Last Penumbral External Contact	2064 August 12 at 20:20:24.3 UTC

August 12, 2064 Solar Eclipse Parameters
Parameter	Value
Eclipse Magnitude	1.04946
Eclipse Obscuration	1.10138
Gamma	−0.46521
Sun Right Ascension	09h32m49.7s
Sun Declination	+14°33'07.1"
Sun Semi-Diameter	15'47.0"
Sun Equatorial Horizontal Parallax	08.7"
Moon Right Ascension	09h32m02.7s
Moon Declination	+14°07'45.3"
Moon Semi-Diameter	16'19.3"
Moon Equatorial Horizontal Parallax	0°59'54.2"
ΔT	93.6 s

== Eclipse season ==
This eclipse is part of an eclipse season, a period, roughly every six months, when eclipses occur. Only two (or occasionally three) eclipse seasons occur each year, and each season lasts about 35 days and repeats just short of six months (173 days) later; thus two full eclipse seasons always occur each year. Either two or three eclipses happen each eclipse season. In the sequence below, each eclipse is separated by a fortnight.

Eclipse season of July–August 2064
July 28 Ascending node (full moon)	August 12 Descending node (new moon)
Partial lunar eclipse Lunar Saros 120	Total solar eclipse Solar Saros 146

== Related eclipses ==
=== Eclipses in 2064 ===
- A partial lunar eclipse on February 2.
- An annular solar eclipse on February 17.
- A partial lunar eclipse on July 28.
- A total solar eclipse on August 12.

=== Metonic ===
- Preceded by: Solar eclipse of October 24, 2060
- Followed by: Solar eclipse of May 31, 2068

=== Tzolkinex ===
- Preceded by: Solar eclipse of July 1, 2057
- Followed by: Solar eclipse of September 23, 2071

=== Half-Saros ===
- Preceded by: Lunar eclipse of August 7, 2055
- Followed by: Lunar eclipse of August 17, 2073

=== Tritos ===
- Preceded by: Solar eclipse of September 12, 2053
- Followed by: Solar eclipse of July 13, 2075

=== Solar Saros 146 ===
- Preceded by: Solar eclipse of August 2, 2046
- Followed by: Solar eclipse of August 24, 2082

=== Inex ===
- Preceded by: Solar eclipse of September 2, 2035
- Followed by: Solar eclipse of July 23, 2093

=== Triad ===
- Preceded by: Solar eclipse of October 12, 1977
- Followed by: Solar eclipse of June 14, 2151

=== Solar eclipses of 2062–2065 ===
This eclipse is a member of a semester series. An eclipse in a semester series of solar eclipses repeats approximately every 177 days and 4 hours (a semester) at alternating nodes of the Moon's orbit.

The partial solar eclipses on July 3, 2065 and December 27, 2065 occur in the next lunar year eclipse set.

Solar eclipse series sets from 2062 to 2065
Ascending node			Descending node		
Saros	Map	Gamma	Saros	Map	Gamma
121	March 11, 2062 Partial	−1.0238	126	September 3, 2062 Partial	1.0191
131	February 28, 2063 Annular	−0.336	136	August 24, 2063 Total	0.2771
141	February 17, 2064 Annular	0.3597	146	August 12, 2064 Total	−0.4652
151	February 5, 2065 Partial	1.0336	156	August 2, 2065 Partial	−1.2759

=== Saros 146 ===
This eclipse is a part of Saros series 146, repeating every 18 years, 11 days, and containing 76 events. The series started with a partial solar eclipse on September 19, 1541. It contains total eclipses from May 29, 1938 through October 7, 2154; hybrid eclipses from October 17, 2172 through November 20, 2226; and annular eclipses from November 30, 2244 through August 10, 2659. The series ends at member 76 as a partial eclipse on December 29, 2893. Its eclipses are tabulated in three columns; every third eclipse in the same column is one exeligmos apart, so they all cast shadows over approximately the same parts of the Earth.

The longest duration of totality was produced by member 26 at 5 minutes, 21 seconds on June 30, 1992, and the longest duration of annularity will be produced by member 63 at 3 minutes, 30 seconds on August 10, 2659. All eclipses in this series occur at the Moon’s descending node of orbit.

Series members 16–37 occur between 1801 and 2200:
16	17	18
March 13, 1812	March 24, 1830	April 3, 1848
19	20	21
April 15, 1866	April 25, 1884	May 7, 1902
22	23	24
May 18, 1920	May 29, 1938	June 8, 1956
25	26	27
June 20, 1974	June 30, 1992	July 11, 2010
28	29	30
July 22, 2028	August 2, 2046	August 12, 2064
31	32	33
August 24, 2082	September 4, 2100	September 15, 2118
34	35	36
September 26, 2136	October 7, 2154	October 17, 2172
37
October 29, 2190

=== Metonic series ===
The metonic series repeats eclipses every 19 years (6939.69 days), lasting about 5 cycles. Eclipses occur in nearly the same calendar date. In addition, the octon subseries repeats 1/5 of that or every 3.8 years (1387.94 days). All eclipses in this table occur at the Moon's descending node.

22 eclipse events between June 1, 2011 and October 24, 2098
May 31–June 1	March 19–20	January 5–6	October 24–25	August 12–13
118	120	122	124	126
June 1, 2011	March 20, 2015	January 6, 2019	October 25, 2022	August 12, 2026
128	130	132	134	136
June 1, 2030	March 20, 2034	January 5, 2038	October 25, 2041	August 12, 2045
138	140	142	144	146
May 31, 2049	March 20, 2053	January 5, 2057	October 24, 2060	August 12, 2064
148	150	152	154	156
May 31, 2068	March 19, 2072	January 6, 2076	October 24, 2079	August 13, 2083
158	160	162	164	
June 1, 2087			October 24, 2098	

=== Tritos series ===
This eclipse is a part of a tritos cycle, repeating at alternating nodes every 135 synodic months (≈ 3986.63 days, or 11 years minus 1 month). Their appearance and longitude are irregular due to a lack of synchronization with the anomalistic month (period of perigee), but groupings of 3 tritos cycles (≈ 33 years minus 3 months) come close (≈ 434.044 anomalistic months), so eclipses are similar in these groupings.

Series members between 1801 and 2200
August 28, 1802 (Saros 122)	July 27, 1813 (Saros 123)	June 26, 1824 (Saros 124)	May 27, 1835 (Saros 125)	April 25, 1846 (Saros 126)
March 25, 1857 (Saros 127)	February 23, 1868 (Saros 128)	January 22, 1879 (Saros 129)	December 22, 1889 (Saros 130)	November 22, 1900 (Saros 131)
October 22, 1911 (Saros 132)	September 21, 1922 (Saros 133)	August 21, 1933 (Saros 134)	July 20, 1944 (Saros 135)	June 20, 1955 (Saros 136)
May 20, 1966 (Saros 137)	April 18, 1977 (Saros 138)	March 18, 1988 (Saros 139)	February 16, 1999 (Saros 140)	January 15, 2010 (Saros 141)
December 14, 2020 (Saros 142)	November 14, 2031 (Saros 143)	October 14, 2042 (Saros 144)	September 12, 2053 (Saros 145)	August 12, 2064 (Saros 146)
July 13, 2075 (Saros 147)	June 11, 2086 (Saros 148)	May 11, 2097 (Saros 149)	April 11, 2108 (Saros 150)	March 11, 2119 (Saros 151)
February 8, 2130 (Saros 152)	January 8, 2141 (Saros 153)	December 8, 2151 (Saros 154)	November 7, 2162 (Saros 155)	October 7, 2173 (Saros 156)
September 4, 2184 (Saros 157)	August 5, 2195 (Saros 158)			

=== Inex series ===
This eclipse is a part of the long period inex cycle, repeating at alternating nodes, every 358 synodic months (≈ 10,571.95 days, or 29 years minus 20 days). Their appearance and longitude are irregular due to a lack of synchronization with the anomalistic month (period of perigee). However, groupings of 3 inex cycles (≈ 87 years minus 2 months) comes close (≈ 1,151.02 anomalistic months), so eclipses are similar in these groupings.

Series members between 1801 and 2200
February 11, 1804 (Saros 137)	January 20, 1833 (Saros 138)	December 31, 1861 (Saros 139)
December 12, 1890 (Saros 140)	November 22, 1919 (Saros 141)	November 1, 1948 (Saros 142)
October 12, 1977 (Saros 143)	September 22, 2006 (Saros 144)	September 2, 2035 (Saros 145)
August 12, 2064 (Saros 146)	July 23, 2093 (Saros 147)	July 4, 2122 (Saros 148)
June 14, 2151 (Saros 149)	May 24, 2180 (Saros 150)	
