= Solar eclipse of November 22, 1984 =

Total eclipse

- Total eclipse
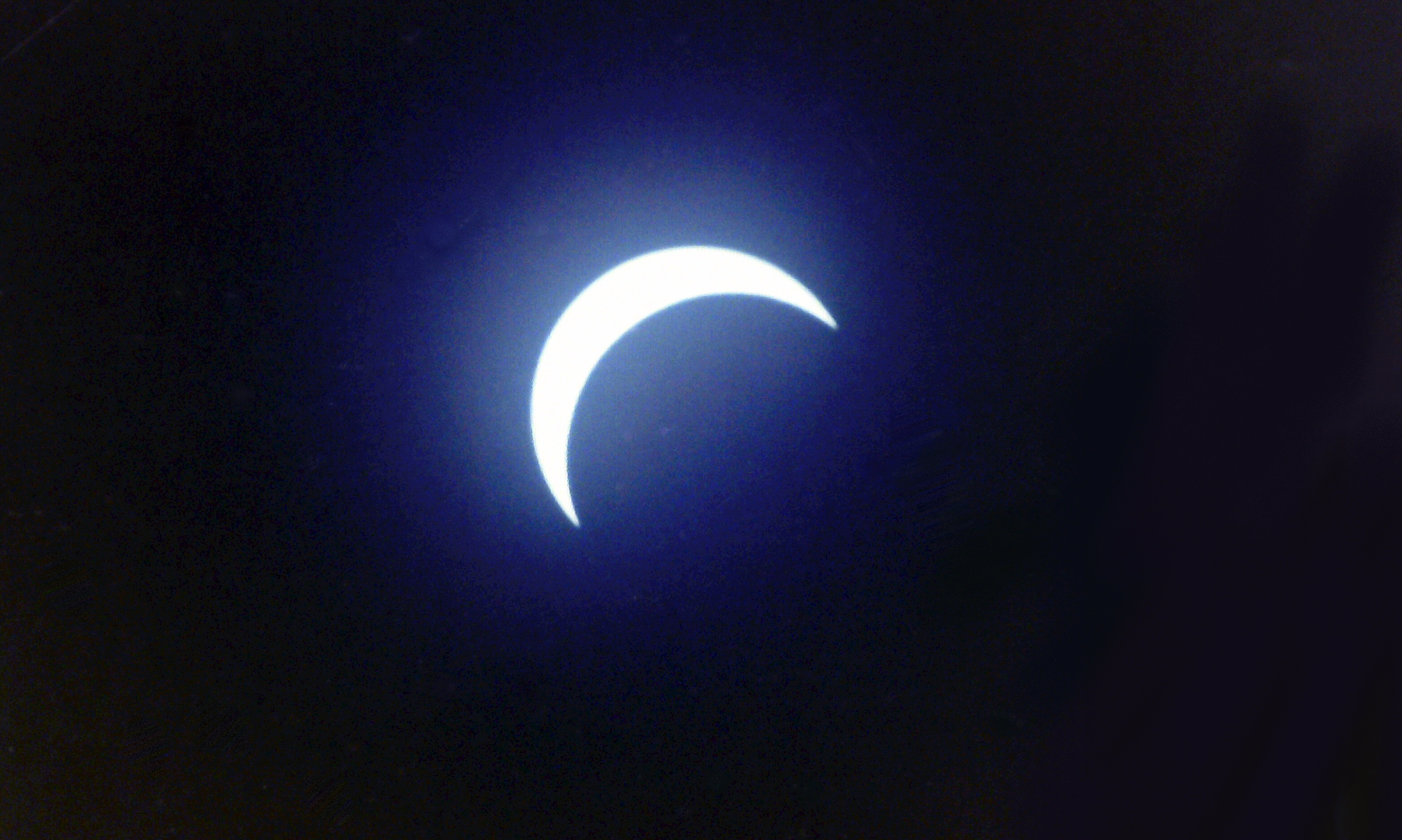
- Partial from Gisborne, New Zealand

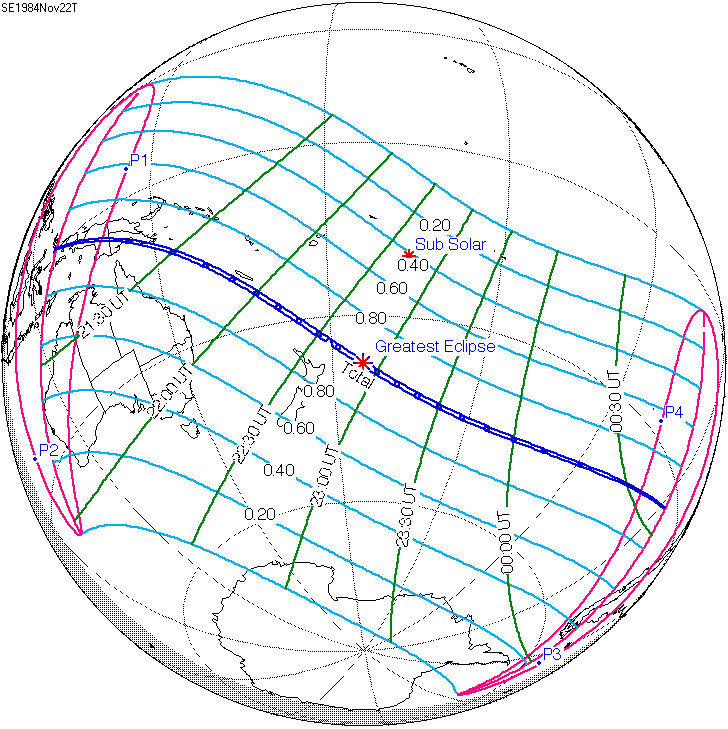
- Map
- Gamma: −0.3132
- Magnitude: 1.0237

Maximum eclipse
- Duration: 120 s (2 min 0 s)
- Coordinates: 37.8°S 173.6°W
- Max. width of band: 85 km (53 mi)

Times (UTC)
- Greatest eclipse: 22:54:17

References
- Saros: 142 (21 of 72)
- Catalog # (SE5000): 9475

A total solar eclipse occurred at the Moon's descending node of orbit between Thursday, November 22 and Friday, November 23, 1984, with a magnitude of 1.0237. A solar eclipse occurs when the Moon passes between Earth and the Sun, thereby totally or partly obscuring the image of the Sun for a viewer on Earth. A total solar eclipse occurs when the Moon's apparent diameter is larger than the Sun's, blocking all direct sunlight, turning day into darkness. Totality occurs in a narrow path across Earth's surface, with the partial solar eclipse visible over a surrounding region thousands of kilometres wide. Occurring about 2.1 days after perigee (on November 20, 1984, at 20:50 UTC), the Moon's apparent diameter was larger.

Totality was visible in Indonesia, Papua New Guinea and southern Pacific Ocean. West of the International Date Line the eclipse took place on November 23, including all land in the path of totality. A partial eclipse was visible for parts of Indonesia, Australia, Oceania, Antarctica, and extreme southern South America.

== Observations ==
Jay Pasachoff led an observation team from Williams College in Massachusetts to Papua New Guinea, taking images of the process of the eclipse and the corona, as well as the Baily's beads and the illuminance of the corona. Besides the observations, the team members also went to places near the Sepik River in northern Papua New Guinea.

== Eclipse details ==
Shown below are two tables displaying details about this particular solar eclipse. The first table outlines times at which the Moon's penumbra or umbra attains the specific parameter, and the second table describes various other parameters pertaining to this eclipse.

November 22, 1984 Solar Eclipse Times
Event	Time (UTC)
First Penumbral External Contact	1984 November 22 at 20:14:19.4 UTC
First Umbral External Contact	1984 November 22 at 21:13:34.5 UTC
First Central Line	1984 November 22 at 21:13:48.2 UTC
First Umbral Internal Contact	1984 November 22 at 21:14:01.9 UTC
First Penumbral Internal Contact	1984 November 22 at 22:19:19.9 UTC
Greatest Eclipse	1984 November 22 at 22:54:16.8 UTC
Greatest Duration	1984 November 22 at 22:55:25.9 UTC
Ecliptic Conjunction	1984 November 22 at 22:57:34.7 UTC
Equatorial Conjunction	1984 November 22 at 23:04:48.0 UTC
Last Penumbral Internal Contact	1984 November 22 at 23:28:57.9 UTC
Last Umbral Internal Contact	1984 November 23 at 00:34:27.7 UTC
Last Central Line	1984 November 23 at 00:34:39.2 UTC
Last Umbral External Contact	1984 November 23 at 00:34:50.7 UTC
Last Penumbral External Contact	1984 November 23 at 01:34:14.6 UTC

November 22, 1984 Solar Eclipse Parameters
Parameter	Value
Eclipse Magnitude	1.02368
Eclipse Obscuration	1.04792
Gamma	−0.31318
Sun Right Ascension	15h54m44.1s
Sun Declination	-20°19'37.3"
Sun Semi-Diameter	16'11.9"
Sun Equatorial Horizontal Parallax	08.9"
Moon Right Ascension	15h54m19.9s
Moon Declination	-20°37'27.2"
Moon Semi-Diameter	16'19.2"
Moon Equatorial Horizontal Parallax	0°59'53.7"
ΔT	54.3 s

== Eclipse season ==
This eclipse is part of an eclipse season, a period, roughly every six months, when eclipses occur. Only two (or occasionally three) eclipse seasons occur each year, and each season lasts about 35 days and repeats just short of six months (173 days) later; thus two full eclipse seasons always occur each year. Either two or three eclipses happen each eclipse season. In the sequence below, each eclipse is separated by a fortnight.

Eclipse season of November 1984
November 8 Ascending node (full moon)	November 22 Descending node (new moon)
Penumbral lunar eclipse Lunar Saros 116	Annular solar eclipse Solar Saros 142

== Related eclipses ==
=== Eclipses in 1984 ===
- A penumbral lunar eclipse on May 15.
- An annular solar eclipse on May 30.
- A penumbral lunar eclipse on June 13.
- A penumbral lunar eclipse on November 8.
- A total solar eclipse on November 22.

=== Metonic ===
- Preceded by: Solar eclipse of February 4, 1981
- Followed by: Solar eclipse of September 11, 1988

=== Tzolkinex ===
- Preceded by: Solar eclipse of October 12, 1977
- Followed by: Solar eclipse of January 4, 1992

=== Half-Saros ===
- Preceded by: Lunar eclipse of November 18, 1975
- Followed by: Lunar eclipse of November 29, 1993

=== Tritos ===
- Preceded by: Solar eclipse of December 24, 1973
- Followed by: Solar eclipse of October 24, 1995

=== Solar Saros 142 ===
- Preceded by: Solar eclipse of November 12, 1966
- Followed by: Solar eclipse of December 4, 2002

=== Inex ===
- Preceded by: Solar eclipse of December 14, 1955
- Followed by: Solar eclipse of November 3, 2013

=== Triad ===
- Preceded by: Solar eclipse of January 22, 1898
- Followed by: Solar eclipse of September 23, 2071

=== Solar eclipses of 1982–1985 ===
This eclipse is a member of a semester series. An eclipse in a semester series of solar eclipses repeats approximately every 177 days and 4 hours (a semester) at alternating nodes of the Moon's orbit.

The partial solar eclipses on January 25, 1982 and July 20, 1982 occur in the previous lunar year eclipse set.

Solar eclipse series sets from 1982 to 1985
Ascending node			Descending node		
Saros	Map	Gamma	Saros	Map	Gamma
117	June 21, 1982 Partial	−1.2102	122	December 15, 1982 Partial	1.1293
127	June 11, 1983 Total	−0.4947	132	December 4, 1983 Annular	0.4015
137	May 30, 1984 Annular	0.2755	142 Partial in Gisborne, New Zealand	November 22, 1984 Total	−0.3132
147	May 19, 1985 Partial	1.072	152	November 12, 1985 Total	−0.9795

=== Saros 142 ===
This eclipse is a part of Saros series 142, repeating every 18 years, 11 days, and containing 72 events. The series started with a partial solar eclipse on April 17, 1624. It contains a hybrid eclipse on July 14, 1768, and total eclipses from July 25, 1786 through October 29, 2543. There are no annular eclipses in this set. The series ends at member 72 as a partial eclipse on June 5, 2904. Its eclipses are tabulated in three columns; every third eclipse in the same column is one exeligmos apart, so they all cast shadows over approximately the same parts of the Earth.

The longest duration of totality will be produced by member 38 at 6 minutes, 34 seconds on May 28, 2291. All eclipses in this series occur at the Moon’s descending node of orbit.

Series members 11–32 occur between 1801 and 2200:
11	12	13
August 5, 1804	August 16, 1822	August 27, 1840
14	15	16
September 7, 1858	September 17, 1876	September 29, 1894
17	18	19
October 10, 1912	October 21, 1930	November 1, 1948
20	21	22
November 12, 1966	November 22, 1984	December 4, 2002
23	24	25
December 14, 2020	December 26, 2038	January 5, 2057
26	27	28
January 16, 2075	January 27, 2093	February 8, 2111
29	30	31
February 18, 2129	March 2, 2147	March 12, 2165
32
March 23, 2183

=== Metonic series ===
The metonic series repeats eclipses every 19 years (6939.69 days), lasting about 5 cycles. Eclipses occur in nearly the same calendar date. In addition, the octon subseries repeats 1/5 of that or every 3.8 years (1387.94 days). All eclipses in this table occur at the Moon's descending node.

22 eclipse events between September 12, 1931 and July 1, 2011
September 11–12	June 30–July 1	April 17–19	February 4–5	November 22–23
114	116	118	120	122
September 12, 1931	June 30, 1935	April 19, 1939	February 4, 1943	November 23, 1946
124	126	128	130	132
September 12, 1950	June 30, 1954	April 19, 1958	February 5, 1962	November 23, 1965
134	136	138	140	142
September 11, 1969	June 30, 1973	April 18, 1977	February 4, 1981	November 22, 1984
144	146	148	150	152
September 11, 1988	June 30, 1992	April 17, 1996	February 5, 2000	November 23, 2003
154	156			
September 11, 2007	July 1, 2011			

=== Tritos series ===
This eclipse is a part of a tritos cycle, repeating at alternating nodes every 135 synodic months (≈ 3986.63 days, or 11 years minus 1 month). Their appearance and longitude are irregular due to a lack of synchronization with the anomalistic month (period of perigee), but groupings of 3 tritos cycles (≈ 33 years minus 3 months) come close (≈ 434.044 anomalistic months), so eclipses are similar in these groupings.

Series members between 1801 and 2200
April 4, 1810 (Saros 126)	March 4, 1821 (Saros 127)	February 1, 1832 (Saros 128)	December 31, 1842 (Saros 129)	November 30, 1853 (Saros 130)
October 30, 1864 (Saros 131)	September 29, 1875 (Saros 132)	August 29, 1886 (Saros 133)	July 29, 1897 (Saros 134)	June 28, 1908 (Saros 135)
May 29, 1919 (Saros 136)	April 28, 1930 (Saros 137)	March 27, 1941 (Saros 138)	February 25, 1952 (Saros 139)	January 25, 1963 (Saros 140)
December 24, 1973 (Saros 141)	November 22, 1984 (Saros 142)	October 24, 1995 (Saros 143)	September 22, 2006 (Saros 144)	August 21, 2017 (Saros 145)
July 22, 2028 (Saros 146)	June 21, 2039 (Saros 147)	May 20, 2050 (Saros 148)	April 20, 2061 (Saros 149)	March 19, 2072 (Saros 150)
February 16, 2083 (Saros 151)	January 16, 2094 (Saros 152)	December 17, 2104 (Saros 153)	November 16, 2115 (Saros 154)	October 16, 2126 (Saros 155)
September 15, 2137 (Saros 156)	August 14, 2148 (Saros 157)	July 15, 2159 (Saros 158)	June 14, 2170 (Saros 159)	May 13, 2181 (Saros 160)
April 12, 2192 (Saros 161)

=== Inex series ===
This eclipse is a part of the long period inex cycle, repeating at alternating nodes, every 358 synodic months (≈ 10,571.95 days, or 29 years minus 20 days). Their appearance and longitude are irregular due to a lack of synchronization with the anomalistic month (period of perigee). However, groupings of 3 inex cycles (≈ 87 years minus 2 months) comes close (≈ 1,151.02 anomalistic months), so eclipses are similar in these groupings.

Series members between 1801 and 2200
March 24, 1811 (Saros 136)	March 4, 1840 (Saros 137)	February 11, 1869 (Saros 138)
January 22, 1898 (Saros 139)	January 3, 1927 (Saros 140)	December 14, 1955 (Saros 141)
November 22, 1984 (Saros 142)	November 3, 2013 (Saros 143)	October 14, 2042 (Saros 144)
September 23, 2071 (Saros 145)	September 4, 2100 (Saros 146)	August 15, 2129 (Saros 147)
July 25, 2158 (Saros 148)	July 6, 2187 (Saros 149)	
