= Solar eclipse of October 12, 1977 =

Total eclipse

- Total eclipse
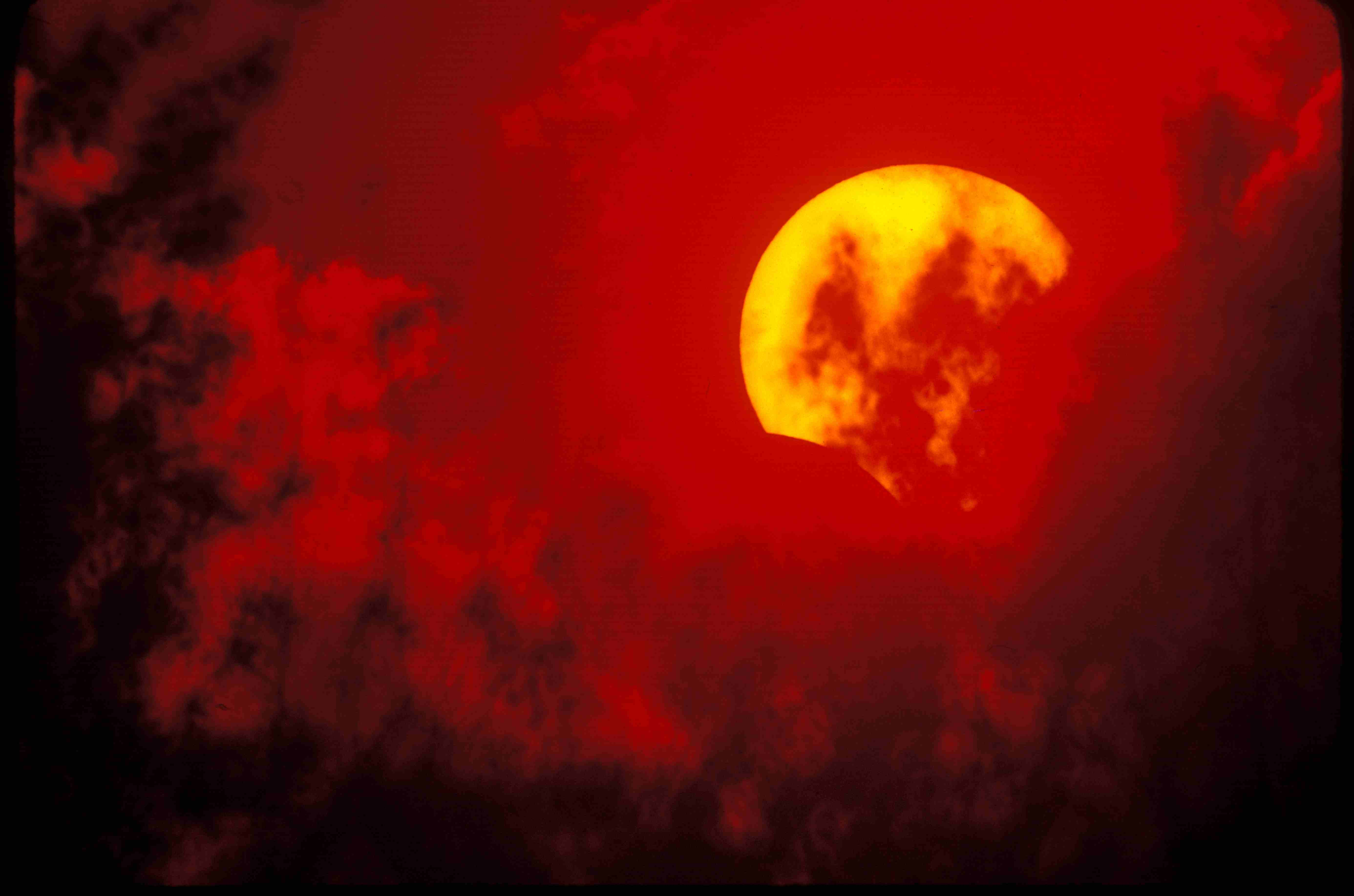

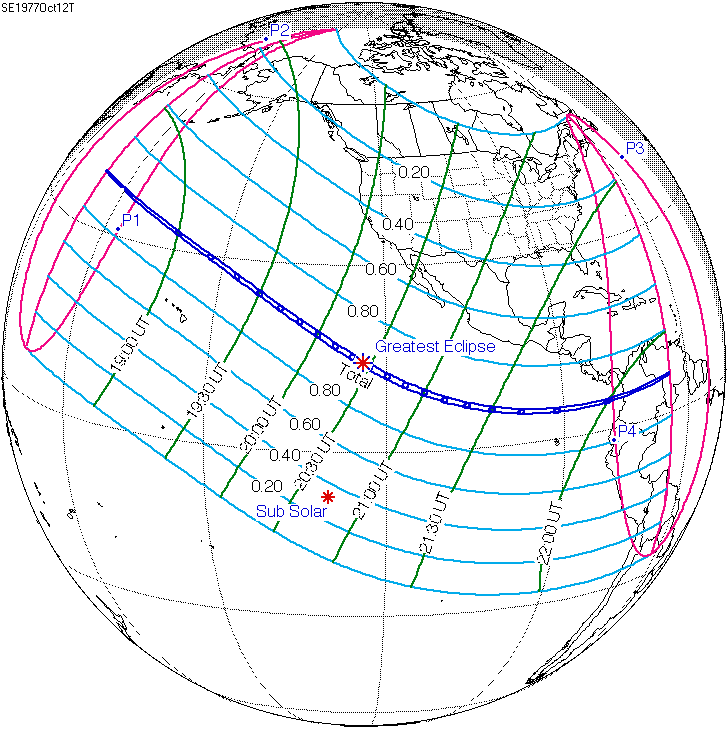
- Map
- Gamma: 0.3836
- Magnitude: 1.0269

Maximum eclipse
- Duration: 157 s (2 min 37 s)
- Coordinates: 14.1°N 123.6°W
- Max. width of band: 99 km (62 mi)

Times (UTC)
- Greatest eclipse: 20:27:27

References
- Saros: 143 (21 of 72)
- Catalog # (SE5000): 9459

A total solar eclipse occurred at the Moon's ascending node of orbit on Wednesday, October 12, 1977, with a magnitude of 1.0269. A solar eclipse occurs when the Moon passes between Earth and the Sun, thereby totally or partly obscuring the image of the Sun for a viewer on Earth. A total solar eclipse occurs when the Moon's apparent diameter is larger than the Sun's, blocking all direct sunlight, turning day into darkness. Totality occurs in a narrow path across Earth's surface, with the partial solar eclipse visible over a surrounding region thousands of kilometres wide. Occurring about 2.6 days before perigee (on October 15, 1977, at 10:00 UTC), the Moon's apparent diameter was larger.

Totality was visible in the Pacific Ocean, Colombia and Venezuela. A partial eclipse was visible for parts of North America, Central America, the Caribbean, and northern South America.

== Observations ==
The National Geographic Society funded an expedition by sea led by Jay Pasachoff from Williams College, Massachusetts to the northeast Pacific Ocean to observe the total eclipse. The team took images of the sky and corona during the totality phase as well as corona spectrum and infrared images.

== Eclipse details ==
Shown below are two tables displaying details about this particular solar eclipse. The first table outlines times at which the Moon's penumbra or umbra attains the specific parameter, and the second table describes various other parameters pertaining to this eclipse.

October 12, 1977 Solar Eclipse Times
| Event | Time (UTC) |
|---|---|
| First Penumbral External Contact | 1977 October 12 at 17:48:24.0 UTC |
| First Umbral External Contact | 1977 October 12 at 18:48:59.6 UTC |
| First Central Line | 1977 October 12 at 18:49:18.4 UTC |
| First Umbral Internal Contact | 1977 October 12 at 18:49:37.3 UTC |
| First Penumbral Internal Contact | 1977 October 12 at 20:01:41.4 UTC |
| Equatorial Conjunction | 1977 October 12 at 20:15:17.1 UTC |
| Greatest Eclipse | 1977 October 12 at 20:27:27.3 UTC |
| Greatest Duration | 1977 October 12 at 20:30:55.5 UTC |
| Ecliptic Conjunction | 1977 October 12 at 20:31:29.7 UTC |
| Last Penumbral Internal Contact | 1977 October 12 at 20:53:33.8 UTC |
| Last Umbral Internal Contact | 1977 October 12 at 22:05:23.4 UTC |
| Last Central Line | 1977 October 12 at 22:05:44.5 UTC |
| Last Umbral External Contact | 1977 October 12 at 22:06:05.6 UTC |
| Last Penumbral External Contact | 1977 October 12 at 23:06:31.5 UTC |

October 12, 1977 Solar Eclipse Parameters
| Parameter | Value |
|---|---|
| Eclipse Magnitude | 1.02694 |
| Eclipse Obscuration | 1.05462 |
| Gamma | 0.38363 |
| Sun Right Ascension | 13h11m36.7s |
| Sun Declination | -07°35'30.0" |
| Sun Semi-Diameter | 16'01.8" |
| Sun Equatorial Horizontal Parallax | 08.8" |
| Moon Right Ascension | 13h12m03.0s |
| Moon Declination | -07°13'40.8" |
| Moon Semi-Diameter | 16'12.7" |
| Moon Equatorial Horizontal Parallax | 0°59'29.8" |
| ΔT | 48.3 s |

== Eclipse season ==
This eclipse is part of an eclipse season, a period, roughly every six months, when eclipses occur. Only two (or occasionally three) eclipse seasons occur each year, and each season lasts about 35 days and repeats just short of six months (173 days) later; thus two full eclipse seasons always occur each year. Either two or three eclipses happen each eclipse season. In the sequence below, each eclipse is separated by a fortnight.

Eclipse season of September–October 1977
| September 27 Descending node (full moon) | October 12 Ascending node (new moon) |
|---|---|
| Penumbral lunar eclipse Lunar Saros 117 | Total solar eclipse Solar Saros 143 |

== Related eclipses ==
=== Eclipses in 1977 ===
- A partial lunar eclipse on April 4.
- An annular solar eclipse on April 18.
- A penumbral lunar eclipse on September 27.
- A total solar eclipse on October 12.

=== Metonic ===
- Preceded by: Solar eclipse of December 24, 1973
- Followed by: Solar eclipse of July 31, 1981

=== Tzolkinex ===
- Preceded by: Solar eclipse of August 31, 1970
- Followed by: Solar eclipse of November 22, 1984

=== Half-Saros ===
- Preceded by: Lunar eclipse of October 6, 1968
- Followed by: Lunar eclipse of October 17, 1986

=== Tritos ===
- Preceded by: Solar eclipse of November 12, 1966
- Followed by: Solar eclipse of September 11, 1988

=== Solar Saros 143 ===
- Preceded by: Solar eclipse of October 2, 1959
- Followed by: Solar eclipse of October 24, 1995

=== Inex ===
- Preceded by: Solar eclipse of November 1, 1948
- Followed by: Solar eclipse of September 22, 2006

=== Triad ===
- Preceded by: Solar eclipse of December 12, 1890
- Followed by: Solar eclipse of August 12, 2064

=== Solar eclipses of 1975–1978 ===
This eclipse is a member of a semester series. An eclipse in a semester series of solar eclipses repeats approximately every 177 days and 4 hours (a semester) at alternating nodes of the Moon's orbit.

Solar eclipse series sets from 1975 to 1978
| Descending node | | | Ascending node | | |
| Saros | Map | Gamma | Saros | Map | Gamma |
| 118 | May 11, 1975 Partial | 1.0647 | 123 | November 3, 1975 Partial | −1.0248 |
| 128 | April 29, 1976 Annular | 0.3378 | 133 | October 23, 1976 Total | −0.327 |
| 138 | April 18, 1977 Annular | −0.399 | 143 | October 12, 1977 Total | 0.3836 |
| 148 | April 7, 1978 Partial | −1.1081 | 153 | October 2, 1978 Partial | 1.1616 |

=== Saros 143 ===
This eclipse is a part of Saros series 143, repeating every 18 years, 11 days, and containing 72 events. The series started with a partial solar eclipse on March 7, 1617. It contains total eclipses from June 24, 1797 through October 24, 1995; hybrid eclipses from November 3, 2013 through December 6, 2067; and annular eclipses from December 16, 2085 through September 16, 2536. The series ends at member 72 as a partial eclipse on April 23, 2897. Its eclipses are tabulated in three columns; every third eclipse in the same column is one exeligmos apart, so they all cast shadows over approximately the same parts of the Earth.

The longest duration of totality was produced by member 16 at 3 minutes, 50 seconds on August 19, 1887, and the longest duration of annularity will be produced by member 51 at 4 minutes, 54 seconds on September 6, 2518. All eclipses in this series occur at the Moon’s ascending node of orbit.

Series members 12–33 occur between 1801 and 2200:
| 12 | 13 | 14 |
|---|---|---|
| July 6, 1815 | July 17, 1833 | July 28, 1851 |
| 15 | 16 | 17 |
| August 7, 1869 | August 19, 1887 | August 30, 1905 |
| 18 | 19 | 20 |
| September 10, 1923 | September 21, 1941 | October 2, 1959 |
| 21 | 22 | 23 |
| October 12, 1977 | October 24, 1995 | November 3, 2013 |
| 24 | 25 | 26 |
| November 14, 2031 | November 25, 2049 | December 6, 2067 |
| 27 | 28 | 29 |
| December 16, 2085 | December 29, 2103 | January 8, 2122 |
| 30 | 31 | 32 |
| January 20, 2140 | January 30, 2158 | February 10, 2176 |
33
February 21, 2194

=== Metonic series ===
The metonic series repeats eclipses every 19 years (6939.69 days), lasting about 5 cycles. Eclipses occur in nearly the same calendar date. In addition, the octon subseries repeats 1/5 of that or every 3.8 years (1387.94 days). All eclipses in this table occur at the Moon's ascending node.

22 eclipse events between December 24, 1916 and July 31, 2000
| December 24–25 | October 12 | July 31–August 1 | May 19–20 | March 7 |
| 111 | 113 | 115 | 117 | 119 |
|---|---|---|---|---|
| December 24, 1916 | | July 31, 1924 | May 19, 1928 | March 7, 1932 |
| 121 | 123 | 125 | 127 | 129 |
| December 25, 1935 | October 12, 1939 | August 1, 1943 | May 20, 1947 | March 7, 1951 |
| 131 | 133 | 135 | 137 | 139 |
| December 25, 1954 | October 12, 1958 | July 31, 1962 | May 20, 1966 | March 7, 1970 |
| 141 | 143 | 145 | 147 | 149 |
| December 24, 1973 | October 12, 1977 | July 31, 1981 | May 19, 1985 | March 7, 1989 |
| 151 | 153 | 155 | | |
| December 24, 1992 | October 12, 1996 | July 31, 2000 | | |

=== Tritos series ===
This eclipse is a part of a tritos cycle, repeating at alternating nodes every 135 synodic months (≈ 3986.63 days, or 11 years minus 1 month). Their appearance and longitude are irregular due to a lack of synchronization with the anomalistic month (period of perigee), but groupings of 3 tritos cycles (≈ 33 years minus 3 months) come close (≈ 434.044 anomalistic months), so eclipses are similar in these groupings.

Series members between 1801 and 2200
| February 21, 1803 (Saros 127) | January 21, 1814 (Saros 128) | December 20, 1824 (Saros 129) | November 20, 1835 (Saros 130) | October 20, 1846 (Saros 131) |
| September 18, 1857 (Saros 132) | August 18, 1868 (Saros 133) | July 19, 1879 (Saros 134) | June 17, 1890 (Saros 135) | May 18, 1901 (Saros 136) |
| April 17, 1912 (Saros 137) | March 17, 1923 (Saros 138) | February 14, 1934 (Saros 139) | January 14, 1945 (Saros 140) | December 14, 1955 (Saros 141) |
| November 12, 1966 (Saros 142) | October 12, 1977 (Saros 143) | September 11, 1988 (Saros 144) | August 11, 1999 (Saros 145) | July 11, 2010 (Saros 146) |
| June 10, 2021 (Saros 147) | May 9, 2032 (Saros 148) | April 9, 2043 (Saros 149) | March 9, 2054 (Saros 150) | February 5, 2065 (Saros 151) |
| January 6, 2076 (Saros 152) | December 6, 2086 (Saros 153) | November 4, 2097 (Saros 154) | October 5, 2108 (Saros 155) | September 5, 2119 (Saros 156) |
| August 4, 2130 (Saros 157) | July 3, 2141 (Saros 158) | June 3, 2152 (Saros 159) | | April 1, 2174 (Saros 161) |

=== Inex series ===
This eclipse is a part of the long period inex cycle, repeating at alternating nodes, every 358 synodic months (≈ 10,571.95 days, or 29 years minus 20 days). Their appearance and longitude are irregular due to a lack of synchronization with the anomalistic month (period of perigee). However, groupings of 3 inex cycles (≈ 87 years minus 2 months) comes close (≈ 1,151.02 anomalistic months), so eclipses are similar in these groupings.

Series members between 1801 and 2200
| February 11, 1804 (Saros 137) | January 20, 1833 (Saros 138) | December 31, 1861 (Saros 139) |
| December 12, 1890 (Saros 140) | November 22, 1919 (Saros 141) | November 1, 1948 (Saros 142) |
| October 12, 1977 (Saros 143) | September 22, 2006 (Saros 144) | September 2, 2035 (Saros 145) |
| August 12, 2064 (Saros 146) | July 23, 2093 (Saros 147) | July 4, 2122 (Saros 148) |
| June 14, 2151 (Saros 149) | May 24, 2180 (Saros 150) | |
