= Solar eclipse of November 22, 1919 =

20th-century annular solar eclipse

- Annular eclipse
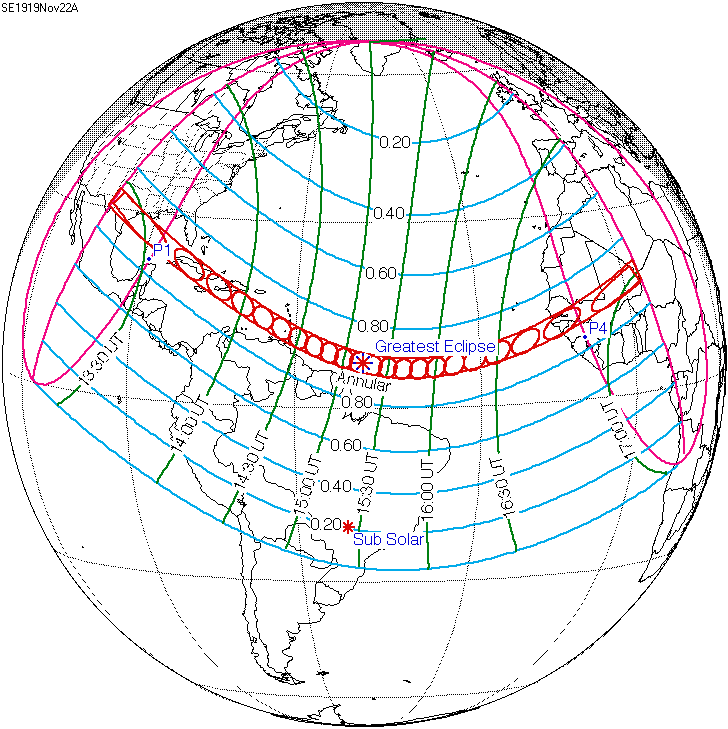
- Map
- Gamma: 0.4549
- Magnitude: 0.9198

Maximum eclipse
- Duration: 697 s (11 min 37 s)
- Coordinates: 6.9°N 48.9°W
- Max. width of band: 341 km (212 mi)

Times (UTC)
- Greatest eclipse: 15:14:12

References
- Saros: 141 (18 of 70)
- Catalog # (SE5000): 9327

An annular solar eclipse occurred at the Moon's ascending node of orbit on Saturday, November 22, 1919, with a magnitude of 0.9198. A solar eclipse occurs when the Moon passes between Earth and the Sun, thereby totally or partly obscuring the image of the Sun for a viewer on Earth. An annular solar eclipse occurs when the Moon's apparent diameter is smaller than the Sun's, blocking most of the Sun's light and causing the Sun to look like an annulus (ring). An annular eclipse appears as a partial eclipse over a region of the Earth thousands of kilometres wide. Occurring only 11 hours before apogee (on November 23, 1919, at 2:20 UTC), the Moon's apparent diameter was smaller.

The duration of annularity at maximum eclipse (closest to but slightly shorter than the longest duration) was 11 minutes, 36.56 seconds in the Atlantic Ocean north of Brazil. It was the longest annular solar eclipse since January 5, 1647, but the Solar eclipse of December 2, 1937 lasted longer.

Places inside the annular eclipse included North America and the Caribbean, including Austin, San Antonio, Houston and Galveston, Texas in the United States and the northern tip of Coahuila, Mexico at around 7:30 CT (13:30 UTC), more than a quarter of the Gulf of Mexico and close to the Florida Keys in the United States which occurred before 8:45 ET (13:45 UTC), it also included Cuba, most of Haiti and the southwesternmost Dominican Republic, it was almost near Venezuela and it included Saint Vincent and the Grenadines and Barbados which happened in the mid morning hours. The greatest eclipse occurred at 15:14:12 UTC. In Africa, it included the Gambia, southern Senegal including Casamance, Portuguese Guinea (now Guinea-Bissau), the northern part of French Guinea (now Guinea) which occurred before 15:45 (16:45 UTC) and southeasternmost Mauritania and the middle portion of the French Sudan (now Mali) which included Bamako and Timbuktu, it occurred in the late afternoon before sunset at 17:00 UTC. A partial eclipse was visible for parts of North America, the Caribbean, northern South America, West Africa, and Western Europe.

== Eclipse details ==
Shown below are two tables displaying details about this particular solar eclipse. The first table outlines times at which the Moon's penumbra or umbra attains the specific parameter, and the second table describes various other parameters pertaining to this eclipse.

November 22, 1919 Solar Eclipse Times
| Event | Time (UTC) |
|---|---|
| First Penumbral External Contact | 1919 November 22 at 12:14:34.5 UTC |
| First Umbral External Contact | 1919 November 22 at 13:24:24.6 UTC |
| First Central Line | 1919 November 22 at 13:28:08.9 UTC |
| First Umbral Internal Contact | 1919 November 22 at 13:31:54.8 UTC |
| Equatorial Conjunction | 1919 November 22 at 15:07:48.2 UTC |
| Greatest Eclipse | 1919 November 22 at 15:14:11.5 UTC |
| Greatest Duration | 1919 November 22 at 15:18:47.7 UTC |
| Ecliptic Conjunction | 1919 November 22 at 15:19:40.7 UTC |
| Last Umbral Internal Contact | 1919 November 22 at 16:56:32.6 UTC |
| Last Central Line | 1919 November 22 at 17:00:18.7 UTC |
| Last Umbral External Contact | 1919 November 22 at 17:04:03.2 UTC |
| Last Penumbral External Contact | 1919 November 22 at 18:13:52.1 UTC |

November 22, 1919 Solar Eclipse Parameters
| Parameter | Value |
|---|---|
| Eclipse Magnitude | 0.91976 |
| Eclipse Obscuration | 0.84597 |
| Gamma | 0.45492 |
| Sun Right Ascension | 15h48m15.3s |
| Sun Declination | -20°00'09.7" |
| Sun Semi-Diameter | 16'11.7" |
| Sun Equatorial Horizontal Parallax | 08.9" |
| Moon Right Ascension | 15h48m27.5s |
| Moon Declination | -19°35'51.4" |
| Moon Semi-Diameter | 14'41.9" |
| Moon Equatorial Horizontal Parallax | 0°53'56.7" |
| ΔT | 21.1 s |

== Eclipse season ==
This eclipse is part of an eclipse season, a period, roughly every six months, when eclipses occur. Only two (or occasionally three) eclipse seasons occur each year, and each season lasts about 35 days and repeats just short of six months (173 days) later; thus two full eclipse seasons always occur each year. Either two or three eclipses happen each eclipse season. In the sequence below, each eclipse is separated by a fortnight.

Eclipse season of November 1919
| November 7 Descending node (full moon) | November 22 Ascending node (new moon) |
|---|---|
| Partial lunar eclipse Lunar Saros 115 | Annular solar eclipse Solar Saros 141 |

== Related eclipses ==
=== Eclipses in 1919 ===
- A penumbral lunar eclipse on May 15.
- A total solar eclipse on May 29.
- A partial lunar eclipse on November 7.
- An annular solar eclipse on November 22.

=== Metonic ===
- Preceded by: Solar eclipse of February 3, 1916
- Followed by: Solar eclipse of September 10, 1923

=== Tzolkinex ===
- Preceded by: Solar eclipse of October 10, 1912
- Followed by: Solar eclipse of January 3, 1927

=== Half-Saros ===
- Preceded by: Lunar eclipse of November 17, 1910
- Followed by: Lunar eclipse of November 27, 1928

=== Tritos ===
- Preceded by: Solar eclipse of December 23, 1908
- Followed by: Solar eclipse of October 21, 1930

=== Solar Saros 141 ===
- Preceded by: Solar eclipse of November 11, 1901
- Followed by: Solar eclipse of December 2, 1937

=== Inex ===
- Preceded by: Solar eclipse of December 12, 1890
- Followed by: Solar eclipse of November 1, 1948

=== Triad ===
- Preceded by: Solar eclipse of January 20, 1833
- Followed by: Solar eclipse of September 22, 2006

=== Solar eclipses of 1916–1920 ===
This eclipse is a member of a semester series. An eclipse in a semester series of solar eclipses repeats approximately every 177 days and 4 hours (a semester) at alternating nodes of the Moon's orbit.

The solar eclipses on February 3, 1916 (total), July 30, 1916 (annular), January 23, 1917 (partial), and July 19, 1917 (partial) occur in the previous lunar year eclipse set.

Solar eclipse series sets from 1916 to 1920
| Ascending node | | | Descending node | | |
| Saros | Map | Gamma | Saros | Map | Gamma |
| 111 | December 24, 1916 Partial | −1.5321 | 116 | June 19, 1917 Partial | 1.2857 |
| 121 | December 14, 1917 Annular | −0.9157 | 126 | June 8, 1918 Total | 0.4658 |
| 131 | December 3, 1918 Annular | −0.2387 | 136 Totality in Príncipe | May 29, 1919 Total | −0.2955 |
| 141 | November 22, 1919 Annular | 0.4549 | 146 | May 18, 1920 Partial | −1.0239 |
| 151 | November 10, 1920 Partial | 1.1287 | | | |

=== Saros 141 ===
This eclipse is a part of Saros series 141, repeating every 18 years, 11 days, and containing 70 events. The series started with a partial solar eclipse on May 19, 1613. It contains annular eclipses from August 4, 1739 through October 14, 2640. There are no hybrid or total eclipses in this set. The series ends at member 70 as a partial eclipse on June 13, 2857. Its eclipses are tabulated in three columns; every third eclipse in the same column is one exeligmos apart, so they all cast shadows over approximately the same parts of the Earth.

The longest duration of annularity was produced by member 20 at 12 minutes, 9 seconds on December 14, 1955. All eclipses in this series occur at the Moon’s ascending node of orbit.

Series members 12–33 occur between 1801 and 2200:
| 12 | 13 | 14 |
|---|---|---|
| September 17, 1811 | September 28, 1829 | October 9, 1847 |
| 15 | 16 | 17 |
| October 19, 1865 | October 30, 1883 | November 11, 1901 |
| 18 | 19 | 20 |
| November 22, 1919 | December 2, 1937 | December 14, 1955 |
| 21 | 22 | 23 |
| December 24, 1973 | January 4, 1992 | January 15, 2010 |
| 24 | 25 | 26 |
| January 26, 2028 | February 5, 2046 | February 17, 2064 |
| 27 | 28 | 29 |
| February 27, 2082 | March 10, 2100 | March 22, 2118 |
| 30 | 31 | 32 |
| April 1, 2136 | April 12, 2154 | April 23, 2172 |
33
May 4, 2190

=== Metonic series ===
The metonic series repeats eclipses every 19 years (6939.69 days), lasting about 5 cycles. Eclipses occur in nearly the same calendar date. In addition, the octon subseries repeats 1/5 of that or every 3.8 years (1387.94 days). All eclipses in this table occur at the Moon's ascending node.

23 eclipse events between February 3, 1859 and June 29, 1946
| February 1–3 | November 21–22 | September 8–10 | June 28–29 | April 16–18 |
| 109 | 111 | 113 | 115 | 117 |
|---|---|---|---|---|
| February 3, 1859 | November 21, 1862 | | June 28, 1870 | April 16, 1874 |
| 119 | 121 | 123 | 125 | 127 |
| February 2, 1878 | November 21, 1881 | September 8, 1885 | June 28, 1889 | April 16, 1893 |
| 129 | 131 | 133 | 135 | 137 |
| February 1, 1897 | November 22, 1900 | September 9, 1904 | June 28, 1908 | April 17, 1912 |
| 139 | 141 | 143 | 145 | 147 |
| February 3, 1916 | November 22, 1919 | September 10, 1923 | June 29, 1927 | April 18, 1931 |
| 149 | 151 | 153 | 155 | |
| February 3, 1935 | November 21, 1938 | September 10, 1942 | June 29, 1946 | |

=== Tritos series ===
This eclipse is a part of a tritos cycle, repeating at alternating nodes every 135 synodic months (≈ 3986.63 days, or 11 years minus 1 month). Their appearance and longitude are irregular due to a lack of synchronization with the anomalistic month (period of perigee), but groupings of 3 tritos cycles (≈ 33 years minus 3 months) come close (≈ 434.044 anomalistic months), so eclipses are similar in these groupings.

The partial solar eclipses on December 7, 2170 (part of Saros 164) and November 7, 2181 (part of Saros 165) are also a part of this series but are not included in the table below.

Series members between 1801 and 2105
| September 28, 1810 (Saros 131) | August 27, 1821 (Saros 132) | July 27, 1832 (Saros 133) | June 27, 1843 (Saros 134) | May 26, 1854 (Saros 135) |
| April 25, 1865 (Saros 136) | March 25, 1876 (Saros 137) | February 22, 1887 (Saros 138) | January 22, 1898 (Saros 139) | December 23, 1908 (Saros 140) |
| November 22, 1919 (Saros 141) | October 21, 1930 (Saros 142) | September 21, 1941 (Saros 143) | August 20, 1952 (Saros 144) | July 20, 1963 (Saros 145) |
| June 20, 1974 (Saros 146) | May 19, 1985 (Saros 147) | April 17, 1996 (Saros 148) | March 19, 2007 (Saros 149) | February 15, 2018 (Saros 150) |
| January 14, 2029 (Saros 151) | December 15, 2039 (Saros 152) | November 14, 2050 (Saros 153) | October 13, 2061 (Saros 154) | September 12, 2072 (Saros 155) |
| August 13, 2083 (Saros 156) | July 12, 2094 (Saros 157) | June 12, 2105 (Saros 158) | | |

=== Inex series ===
This eclipse is a part of the long period inex cycle, repeating at alternating nodes, every 358 synodic months (≈ 10,571.95 days, or 29 years minus 20 days). Their appearance and longitude are irregular due to a lack of synchronization with the anomalistic month (period of perigee). However, groupings of 3 inex cycles (≈ 87 years minus 2 months) comes close (≈ 1,151.02 anomalistic months), so eclipses are similar in these groupings.

Series members between 1801 and 2200
| February 11, 1804 (Saros 137) | January 20, 1833 (Saros 138) | December 31, 1861 (Saros 139) |
| December 12, 1890 (Saros 140) | November 22, 1919 (Saros 141) | November 1, 1948 (Saros 142) |
| October 12, 1977 (Saros 143) | September 22, 2006 (Saros 144) | September 2, 2035 (Saros 145) |
| August 12, 2064 (Saros 146) | July 23, 2093 (Saros 147) | July 4, 2122 (Saros 148) |
| June 14, 2151 (Saros 149) | May 24, 2180 (Saros 150) | |
