= Solar eclipse of June 21, 2039 =

Future annular solar eclipse

- Annular eclipse
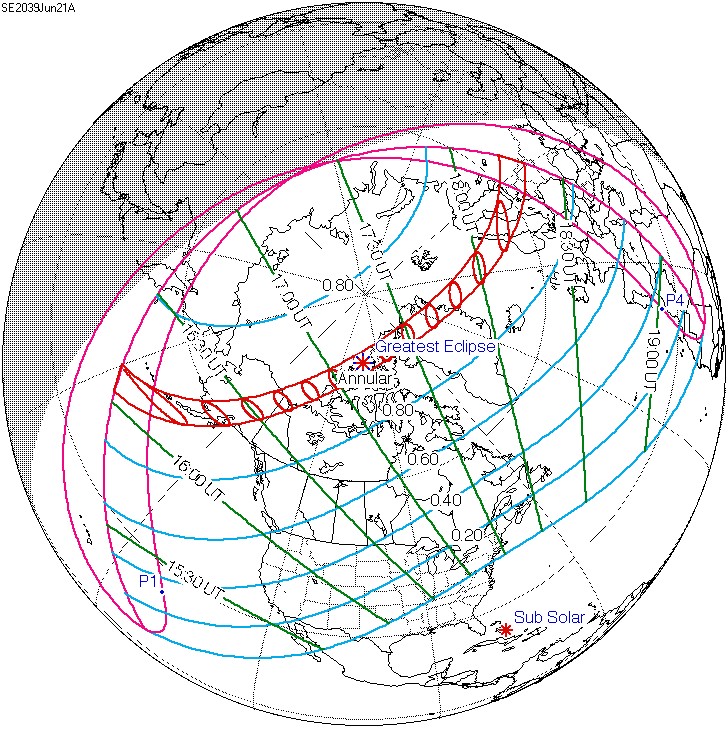
- Map
- Gamma: 0.8312
- Magnitude: 0.9454

Maximum eclipse
- Duration: 245 s (4 min 5 s)
- Coordinates: 78.9°N 102.1°W
- Max. width of band: 365 km (227 mi)

Times (UTC)
- Greatest eclipse: 17:12:54

References
- Saros: 147 (24 of 80)
- Catalog # (SE5000): 9595

An annular solar eclipse will occur at the Moon's ascending node of orbit on Tuesday, June 21, 2039, with a magnitude of 0.9454. A solar eclipse occurs when the Moon passes between Earth and the Sun, thereby totally or partly obscuring the image of the Sun for a viewer on Earth. An annular solar eclipse occurs when the Moon's apparent diameter is smaller than the Sun's, blocking most of the Sun's light and causing the Sun to look like an annulus (ring). An annular eclipse appears as a partial eclipse over a region of the Earth thousands of kilometres wide. Occurring about 2 days after apogee (on June 19, 2039, at 16:55 UTC), the Moon's apparent diameter will be smaller.

Annularity will be visible from parts of Alaska, northern Canada, Greenland, Norway, Sweden, southern Finland, Estonia, Latvia, northeastern Lithuania, western Russia, and Belarus. A partial eclipse will be visible for parts of Hawaii, North America, Europe, Northwest Africa, and northern Russia.

This eclipse will start only a few hours after the northern solstice and most of the path will go across areas with midnight sun. For mainland Norway, Sweden and Belarus, it will be the first central solar eclipse since June 1954.

== Images ==
Animated path

== Eclipse timing ==
=== Places experiencing annular eclipse ===
Solar Eclipse of June 21, 2039 (Local Times)
Country or territory	City or place	Start of partial eclipse	Start of annular eclipse	Maximum eclipse	End of annular eclipse	End of partial eclipse	Duration of annularity (min:s)	Duration of eclipse (hr:min)	Maximum coverage
United States	Unalaska	07:14:12	08:12:24	08:13:29	08:14:34	09:16:53	2:10	2:03	88.50%
United States	Anchorage	07:19:11	08:22:17	08:24:05	08:25:23	09:33:41	3:36	2:15	89.06%
United States	Fairbanks	07:25:28	08:29:38	08:31:31	08:33:25	09:41:53	3:47	2:16	89.15%
Canada	Aklavik	09:31:30	10:40:16	10:40:51	10:41:27	11:54:17	1:11	2:23	89.40%
Canada	Tuktoyaktuk	09:34:09	10:42:50	10:43:57	10:45:02	11:57:33	2:12	2:23	89.43%
Canada	Eureka	11:06:20	12:16:49	12:18:50	12:20:52	13:31:40	4:03	2:25	89.52%
Greenland	Danmarkshavn	16:35:29	17:44:26	17:46:25	17:48:25	18:55:01	3:59	2:20	89.30%
Norway	Mo i Rana	19:02:19	20:05:35	20:07:20	20:09:04	21:09:07	3:29	2:07	88.75%
Norway	Leirfjord	19:02:45	20:06:06	20:08:00	20:09:53	21:09:55	3:47	2:07	88.76%
Norway	Sandnessjøen	19:02:49	20:06:13	20:08:08	20:10:02	21:10:06	3:49	2:07	88.76%
Norway	Levanger	19:07:05	20:11:26	20:12:19	20:13:13	21:13:57	1:47	2:07	88.73%
Sweden	Östersund	19:08:08	20:10:50	20:12:30	20:14:10	21:13:22	3:20	2:05	88.65%
Sweden	Sundsvall	19:09:26	20:11:11	20:13:01	20:14:51	21:13:13	3:40	2:04	88.58%
Estonia	Narva	20:12:42	21:11:57	21:13:11	21:14:26	22:10:44	2:29	1:58	88.29%
Finland	Helsinki	20:12:11	21:11:52	21:13:34	21:15:16	22:11:51	3:24	2:00	88.37%
Estonia	Kohtla-Järve	20:12:54	21:12:06	21:13:36	21:15:07	22:11:18	3:01	1:58	88.31%
Finland	Espoo	20:12:11	21:11:54	21:13:38	21:15:22	22:11:59	3:28	2:00	88.38%
Estonia	Tallinn	20:13:25	21:12:50	21:14:41	21:16:31	22:12:48	3:41	1:59	88.35%
Estonia	Tartu	20:14:40	21:13:25	21:15:14	21:17:03	22:12:44	3:38	1:58	88.28%
Latvia	Gulbene	20:16:32	21:14:59	21:16:48	21:18:37	22:12:49 (sunset)	3:38	1:56	88.24%
Russia	Smolensk	20:18:18	21:15:02	21:16:52	21:18:42	21:33:14 (sunset)	3:40	1:15	88.05%
Latvia	Valmiera	20:16:20	21:15:13	21:16:58	21:18:44	22:14:27	3:31	1:58	88.28%
Estonia	Kuressaare	20:15:52	21:15:53	21:17:19	21:18:46	22:15:29	2:53	2:00	88.36%
Belarus	Vitebsk	20:18:25	21:15:40	21:17:28	21:19:15	21:43:35 (sunset)	3:35	1:25	88.10%
Belarus	Polotsk	20:18:29	21:16:11	21:17:54	21:19:36	21:51:21 (sunset)	3:25	1:33	88.14%
Latvia	Riga	20:17:37	21:17:11	21:18:23	21:19:36	22:15:55	2:25	1:58	88.28%
Latvia	Daugavpils	20:18:38	21:17:14	21:18:37	21:20:00	22:03:18 (sunset)	2:46	1:45	88.20%
Belarus	Mogilev	20:20:14	21:17:28	21:18:55	21:20:22	21:34:06 (sunset)	2:54	1:14	88.05%
Latvia	Jelgava	20:18:12	21:18:18	21:18:59	21:19:40	22:16:28	1:22	2:02	88.28%
Belarus	Barysaw	20:20:28	21:18:38	21:19:36	21:20:35	21:43:31 (sunset)	1:57	1:23	88.10%

=== Places experiencing partial eclipse ===
Solar Eclipse of June 21, 2039 (Local Times)
Country or territory	City or place	Start of partial eclipse	Maximum eclipse	End of partial eclipse	Duration of eclipse (hr:min)	Maximum coverage
United States	Adak	06:27:17 (sunrise)	07:14:44	08:14:54	1:48	85.39%
Canada	Inuvik	09:31:53	10:41:32	11:55:14	2:23	89.27%
Greenland	Qaanaaq	15:11:39	16:26:12	17:40:16	2:29	87.21%
Greenland	Pituffik	13:11:38	14:26:48	15:41:23	2:30	85.32%
Finland	Rovaniemi	20:01:19	21:03:54	22:03:46	2:02	85.30%
Finland	Kemi	20:02:48	21:05:28	22:05:19	2:03	86.43%
Russia	Moscow	20:14:38	21:08:08	21:17:59 (sunset)	1:03	83.10%
Iceland	Reykjavík	16:56:24	18:09:50	19:18:21	2:22	70.63%
Faroe Islands	Tórshavn	18:07:37	19:17:00	20:21:40	2:14	76.37%
Sweden	Stockholm	19:14:48	20:17:31	21:16:43	2:02	88.34%
Norway	Oslo	19:14:17	20:18:51	21:19:31	2:05	85.01%
Latvia	Ventspils	20:17:29	21:18:56	22:16:59	2:00	88.24%
Latvia	Liepāja	20:19:04	21:20:25	22:18:18	1:59	87.25%
Belarus	Minsk	20:21:17	21:20:32	21:45:13 (sunset)	1:24	87.91%
Lithuania	Vilnius	20:20:52	21:20:47	21:59:33 (sunset)	1:39	87.61%
Denmark	Copenhagen	19:21:58	20:24:58	21:23:59	2:02	80.52%
Ukraine	Rivne	20:26:39	21:25:13	21:31:06 (sunset)	1:04	83.24%
Poland	Warsaw	19:26:04	20:26:10	21:01:05 (sunset)	1:35	81.77%
Germany	Berlin	19:27:29	20:29:18	21:27:06	2:00	76.36%
Czech Republic	Prague	19:31:29	20:32:13	21:15:39 (sunset)	1:44	73.28%
Netherlands	Amsterdam	19:28:48	20:32:26	21:31:28	2:03	69.22%
Ireland	Dublin	18:26:06	19:32:41	20:33:55	2:08	61.59%
Hungary	Budapest	19:34:18	20:33:09	20:44:38 (sunset)	1:10	72.75%
Slovakia	Bratislava	19:33:56	20:33:24	20:55:26 (sunset)	1:22	72.26%
Austria	Vienna	19:34:06	20:33:43	20:58:38 (sunset)	1:25	71.74%
Belgium	Brussels	19:31:49	20:34:56	21:33:23	2:02	66.11%
United Kingdom	London	18:30:37	19:34:59	20:34:24	2:04	63.45%
Croatia	Zagreb	19:38:13	20:36:54	20:49:42 (sunset)	1:11	67.21%
France	Paris	19:35:55	20:38:30	21:36:18	2:00	60.78%
Italy	Rome	19:46:15	20:43:32	20:48:44 (sunset)	1:02	56.78%

== Eclipse details ==
Shown below are two tables displaying details about this particular solar eclipse. The first table outlines times at which the Moon's penumbra or umbra attains the specific parameter, and the second table describes various other parameters pertaining to this eclipse.

June 21, 2039 Solar Eclipse Times
Event	Time (UTC)
First Penumbral External Contact	2039 June 21 at 14:36:23.7 UTC
First Umbral External Contact	2039 June 21 at 16:03:44.2 UTC
First Central Line	2039 June 21 at 16:07:35.0 UTC
First Umbral Internal Contact	2039 June 21 at 16:11:35.6 UTC
Greatest Eclipse	2039 June 21 at 17:12:53.8 UTC
Greatest Duration	2039 June 21 at 17:13:03.9 UTC
Equatorial Conjunction	2039 June 21 at 17:22:29.4 UTC
Ecliptic Conjunction	2039 June 21 at 17:22:39.0 UTC
Last Umbral Internal Contact	2039 June 21 at 18:14:06.4 UTC
Last Central Line	2039 June 21 at 18:18:06.0 UTC
Last Umbral External Contact	2039 June 21 at 18:21:55.6 UTC
Last Penumbral External Contact	2039 June 21 at 19:49:17.2 UTC

June 21, 2039 Solar Eclipse Parameters
Parameter	Value
Eclipse Magnitude	0.94542
Eclipse Obscuration	0.89382
Gamma	0.83117
Sun Right Ascension	06h00m54.5s
Sun Declination	+23°26'03.6"
Sun Semi-Diameter	15'44.3"
Sun Equatorial Horizontal Parallax	08.7"
Moon Right Ascension	06h00m35.3s
Moon Declination	+24°10'44.9"
Moon Semi-Diameter	14'45.6"
Moon Equatorial Horizontal Parallax	0°54'10.2"
ΔT	78.3 s

== Eclipse season ==
This eclipse is part of an eclipse season, a period, roughly every six months, when eclipses occur. Only two (or occasionally three) eclipse seasons occur each year, and each season lasts about 35 days and repeats just short of six months (173 days) later; thus two full eclipse seasons always occur each year. Either two or three eclipses happen each eclipse season. In the sequence below, each eclipse is separated by a fortnight.

Eclipse season of June 2039
June 6 Descending node (full moon)	June 21 Ascending node (new moon)
Partial lunar eclipse Lunar Saros 121	Annular solar eclipse Solar Saros 147

== Related eclipses ==
=== Eclipses in 2039 ===
- A partial lunar eclipse on June 6.
- An annular solar eclipse on June 21.
- A partial lunar eclipse on November 30.
- A total solar eclipse on December 15.

=== Metonic ===
- Preceded by: Solar eclipse of September 2, 2035
- Followed by: Solar eclipse of April 9, 2043

=== Tzolkinex ===
- Preceded by: Solar eclipse of May 9, 2032
- Followed by: Solar eclipse of August 2, 2046

=== Half-Saros ===
- Preceded by: Lunar eclipse of June 15, 2030
- Followed by: Lunar eclipse of June 26, 2048

=== Tritos ===
- Preceded by: Solar eclipse of July 22, 2028
- Followed by: Solar eclipse of May 20, 2050

=== Solar Saros 147 ===
- Preceded by: Solar eclipse of June 10, 2021
- Followed by: Solar eclipse of July 1, 2057

=== Inex ===
- Preceded by: Solar eclipse of July 11, 2010
- Followed by: Solar eclipse of May 31, 2068

=== Triad ===
- Preceded by: Solar eclipse of August 20, 1952
- Followed by: Solar eclipse of April 22, 2126

=== Solar eclipses of 2036–2039 ===
This eclipse is a member of a semester series. An eclipse in a semester series of solar eclipses repeats approximately every 177 days and 4 hours (a semester) at alternating nodes of the Moon's orbit.

The partial solar eclipses on February 27, 2036 and August 21, 2036 occur in the previous lunar year eclipse set.

Solar eclipse series sets from 2036 to 2039
Ascending node			Descending node		
Saros	Map	Gamma	Saros	Map	Gamma
117	July 23, 2036 Partial	−1.425	122	January 16, 2037 Partial	1.1477
127	July 13, 2037 Total	−0.7246	132	January 5, 2038 Annular	0.4169
137	July 2, 2038 Annular	0.0398	142	December 26, 2038 Total	−0.2881
147	June 21, 2039 Annular	0.8312	152	December 15, 2039 Total	−0.9458

=== Saros 147 ===
This eclipse is a part of Saros series 147, repeating every 18 years, 11 days, and containing 80 events. The series started with a partial solar eclipse on October 12, 1624. It contains annular eclipses from May 31, 2003 through July 31, 2706. There are no hybrid or total eclipses in this set. The series ends at member 80 as a partial eclipse on February 24, 3049. Its eclipses are tabulated in three columns; every third eclipse in the same column is one exeligmos apart, so they all cast shadows over approximately the same parts of the Earth.

The longest duration of annularity will be produced by member 38 at 9 minutes, 41 seconds on November 21, 2291. All eclipses in this series occur at the Moon’s ascending node of orbit.

Series members 11–32 occur between 1801 and 2200:
11	12	13
January 30, 1805	February 11, 1823	February 21, 1841
14	15	16
March 4, 1859	March 15, 1877	March 26, 1895
17	18	19
April 6, 1913	April 18, 1931	April 28, 1949
20	21	22
May 9, 1967	May 19, 1985	May 31, 2003
23	24	25
June 10, 2021	June 21, 2039	July 1, 2057
26	27	28
July 13, 2075	July 23, 2093	August 4, 2111
29	30	31
August 15, 2129	August 26, 2147	September 5, 2165
32
September 16, 2183

=== Metonic series ===
The metonic series repeats eclipses every 19 years (6939.69 days), lasting about 5 cycles. Eclipses occur in nearly the same calendar date. In addition, the octon subseries repeats 1/5 of that or every 3.8 years (1387.94 days). All eclipses in this table occur at the Moon's ascending node.

21 eclipse events between June 21, 1982 and June 21, 2058
June 21	April 8–9	January 26	November 13–14	September 1–2
117	119	121	123	125
June 21, 1982	April 9, 1986	January 26, 1990	November 13, 1993	September 2, 1997
127	129	131	133	135
June 21, 2001	April 8, 2005	January 26, 2009	November 13, 2012	September 1, 2016
137	139	141	143	145
June 21, 2020	April 8, 2024	January 26, 2028	November 14, 2031	September 2, 2035
147	149	151	153	155
June 21, 2039	April 9, 2043	January 26, 2047	November 14, 2050	September 2, 2054
157
June 21, 2058

=== Tritos series ===
This eclipse is a part of a tritos cycle, repeating at alternating nodes every 135 synodic months (≈ 3986.63 days, or 11 years minus 1 month). Their appearance and longitude are irregular due to a lack of synchronization with the anomalistic month (period of perigee), but groupings of 3 tritos cycles (≈ 33 years minus 3 months) come close (≈ 434.044 anomalistic months), so eclipses are similar in these groupings.

Series members between 1801 and 2200
April 4, 1810 (Saros 126)	March 4, 1821 (Saros 127)	February 1, 1832 (Saros 128)	December 31, 1842 (Saros 129)	November 30, 1853 (Saros 130)
October 30, 1864 (Saros 131)	September 29, 1875 (Saros 132)	August 29, 1886 (Saros 133)	July 29, 1897 (Saros 134)	June 28, 1908 (Saros 135)
May 29, 1919 (Saros 136)	April 28, 1930 (Saros 137)	March 27, 1941 (Saros 138)	February 25, 1952 (Saros 139)	January 25, 1963 (Saros 140)
December 24, 1973 (Saros 141)	November 22, 1984 (Saros 142)	October 24, 1995 (Saros 143)	September 22, 2006 (Saros 144)	August 21, 2017 (Saros 145)
July 22, 2028 (Saros 146)	June 21, 2039 (Saros 147)	May 20, 2050 (Saros 148)	April 20, 2061 (Saros 149)	March 19, 2072 (Saros 150)
February 16, 2083 (Saros 151)	January 16, 2094 (Saros 152)	December 17, 2104 (Saros 153)	November 16, 2115 (Saros 154)	October 16, 2126 (Saros 155)
September 15, 2137 (Saros 156)	August 14, 2148 (Saros 157)	July 15, 2159 (Saros 158)	June 14, 2170 (Saros 159)	May 13, 2181 (Saros 160)
April 12, 2192 (Saros 161)

=== Inex series ===
This eclipse is a part of the long period inex cycle, repeating at alternating nodes, every 358 synodic months (≈ 10,571.95 days, or 29 years minus 20 days). Their appearance and longitude are irregular due to a lack of synchronization with the anomalistic month (period of perigee). However, groupings of 3 inex cycles (≈ 87 years minus 2 months) comes close (≈ 1,151.02 anomalistic months), so eclipses are similar in these groupings.

Series members between 1801 and 2200
November 29, 1807 (Saros 139)	November 9, 1836 (Saros 140)	October 19, 1865 (Saros 141)
September 29, 1894 (Saros 142)	September 10, 1923 (Saros 143)	August 20, 1952 (Saros 144)
July 31, 1981 (Saros 145)	July 11, 2010 (Saros 146)	June 21, 2039 (Saros 147)
May 31, 2068 (Saros 148)	May 11, 2097 (Saros 149)	April 22, 2126 (Saros 150)
April 2, 2155 (Saros 151)	March 12, 2184 (Saros 152)	
