= Solar eclipse of July 11, 2010 =

Total eclipse

- Total eclipse
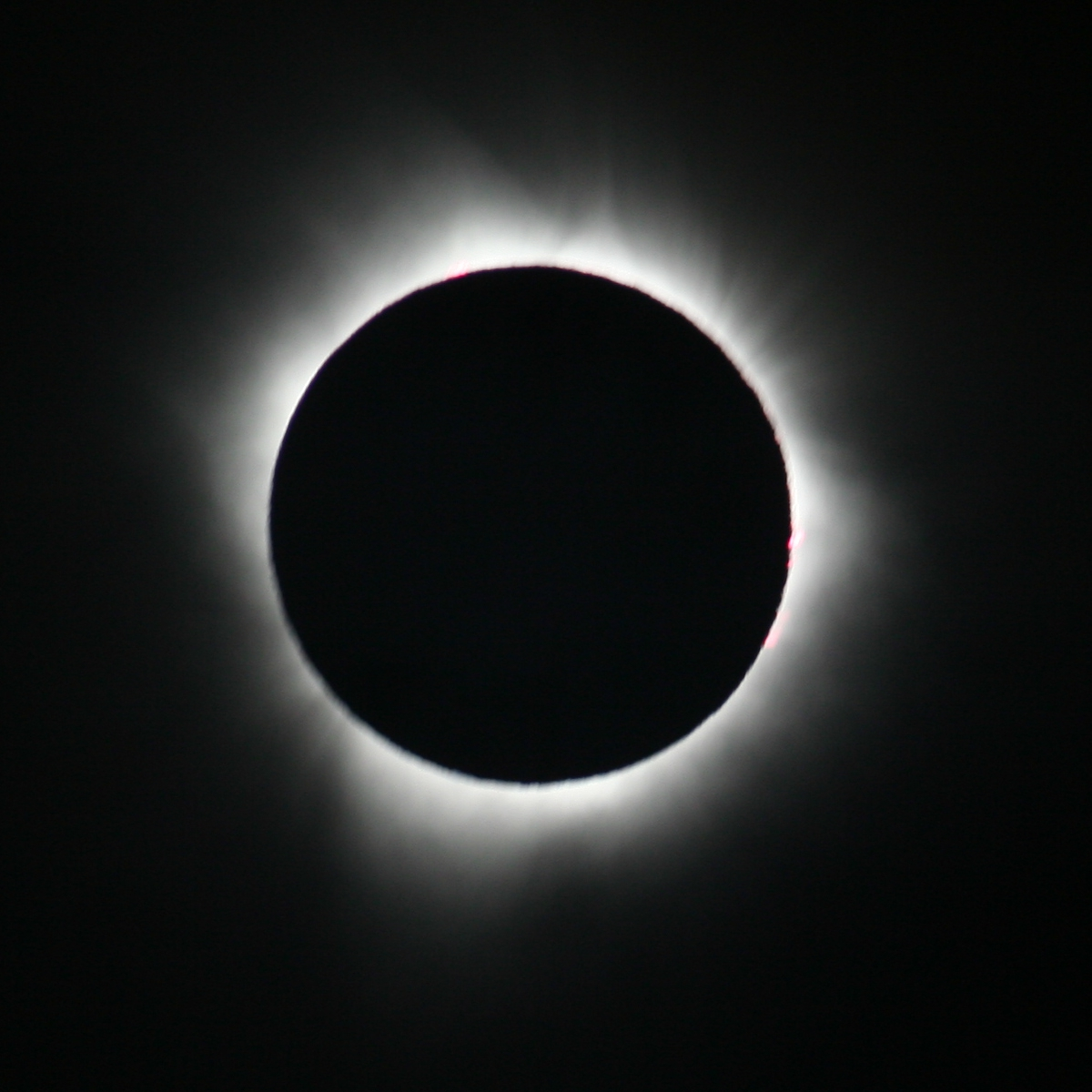
- Totality from Hao, French Polynesia

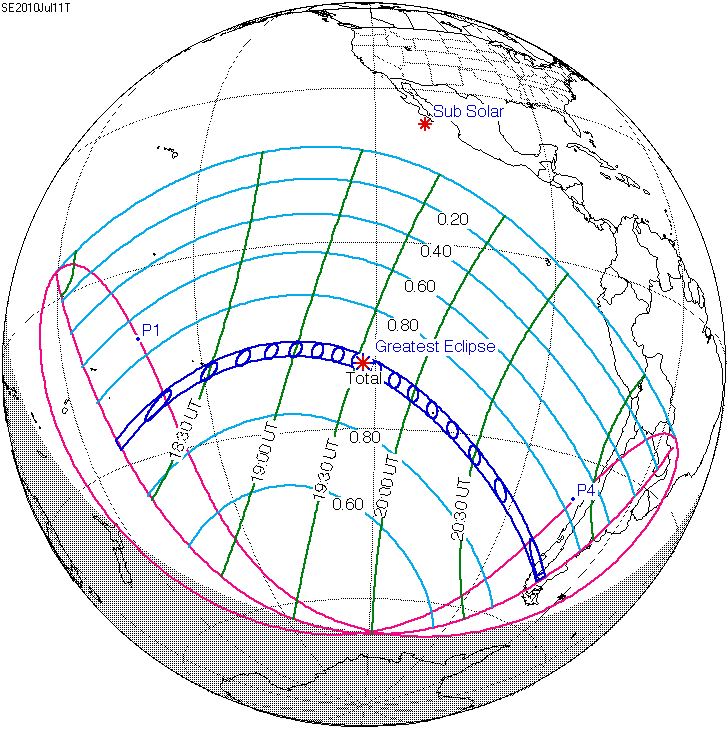
- Map
- Gamma: −0.6788
- Magnitude: 1.058

Maximum eclipse
- Duration: 320 s (5 min 20 s)
- Coordinates: 19.7°S 121.9°W
- Max. width of band: 259 km (161 mi)

Times (UTC)
- (P1) Partial begin: 17:09:41
- (U1) Total begin: 18:15:15
- Greatest eclipse: 19:34:38
- (U4) Total end: 20:51:42
- (P4) Partial end: 21:57:16

References
- Saros: 146 (27 of 76)
- Catalog # (SE5000): 9530

A total solar eclipse occurred at the Moon's descending node of orbit between Sunday, July 11 and Monday, July 12, 2010, with a magnitude of 1.058. A solar eclipse occurs when the Moon passes between Earth and the Sun, thereby totally or partly obscuring the image of the Sun for a viewer on Earth. A total solar eclipse occurs when the Moon's apparent diameter is larger than the Sun's, blocking all direct sunlight, turning day into darkness. Totality occurs in a narrow path across Earth's surface, with the partial solar eclipse visible over a surrounding region thousands of kilometres wide. Occurring about 1.6 days before perigee (on July 13, 2010, at 12:20 UTC), the Moon's apparent diameter was larger.

== Visibility ==
Animated map of the eclipse's visibility over the southern Pacific Ocean

The eclipse on this day was one of the most remote in recorded history. It was visible over much of the southern Pacific Ocean, touching Mangaia (most southerly of the Cook Islands), several atolls in French Polynesia, Easter Island, and Chile and Argentina's Patagonian plains including the Southern Patagonian Ice Field.

Fred Espenak, a NASA astrophysicist, said:

"One of the most unique things about this particular eclipse is that it crosses a unique and interesting archaeological site: Easter Island. On Easter Island there are these great statues... There's a lot of mystery about these statues, but in any case, this is the first total eclipse to hit the island in about 1,400 years."

In French Polynesia, the eclipse was seen with 98 percent totality. During that time, the diamond ring effect and the Baily's beads occurred.

It ended at sunset over the southern tips of Argentina and Chile in South America, including the town of El Calafate. The Sun's altitude was only 1° during the 2 minute 47 second total phase, but Argentino Lake offered an adequate line-of-sight to the eclipse hanging just above the rugged Andes skyline.

A 58% partiality occurred at sunset in Santiago, Chile, but it was not visible due to adverse weather conditions. In other cities such as Valparaíso and Coquimbo, clearer skies permitted the event to be witnessed in continental Chile.

== Observations ==
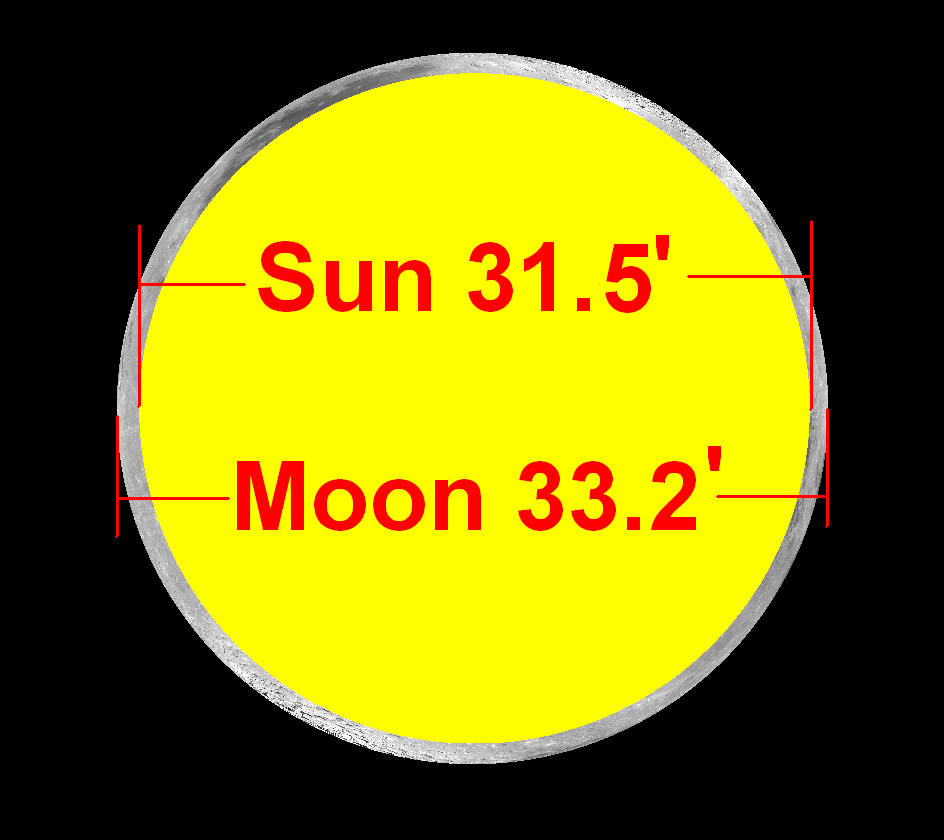
The Moon's diameter was 5.805% larger than the Sun's, represented by the magnitude of eclipse of the table above, making for a relatively long eclipse duration of five minutes, 20.24 seconds.

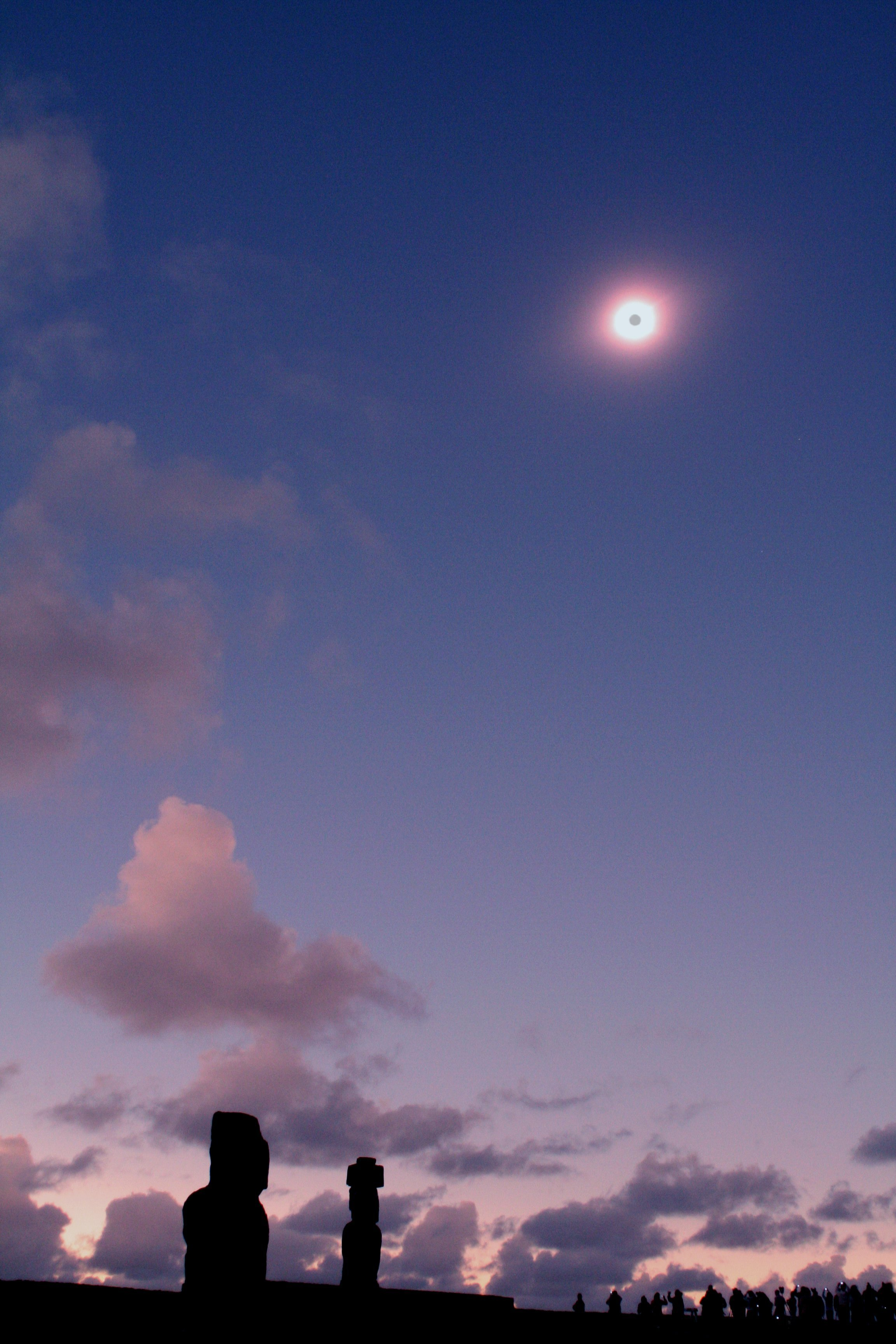
Totality as seen from Hanga Roa, Easter Island

Total eclipse began 750 kilometers (470 mi) southeast of Tonga at approximately 18:15 UTC and reached Easter Island by 20:11 UTC. The global sky photography project The World At Night stationed photographers throughout the eclipse's visibility track. Eclipse chasers photographed the event on board a chartered airplane, cruise ships, numerous Pacific islands, and in Argentina's Patagonia region. Totality was observed for four minutes and 41 seconds (4:41; 281 seconds) on Easter Island, where it was observed for the first time in 1,400 years. Approximately 4,000 observers visited Easter Island for this eclipse, including tourists, scientists, photographers, filmmakers and journalists, prompting an increase in security at its important moai archeological sites. The eclipse occurred at the same time that the final game of the 2010 FIFA World Cup was being played in South Africa, and many soccer fans in Tahiti watched the match instead of observing the partial eclipse with a high percentage of obscuring the Sun by over 98%. The path of totality of this eclipse barely missed some significant inhabited islands of French Polynesia, including passing just about 20 km south of the southern end of Tahiti.

This eclipse was the first one to happen over French Polynesia in 350 years. An estimated 5,000 tourists visited various islands in the archipelago to observe the event. Nearly 120,000 pairs of special glasses were distributed for observers. Eclipse chasers were also able to observe the eclipse at El Calafate, near the southern tip of Argentina, before the sun set just two minutes later.

Several hours after the eclipse was observed in continental Chile, a magnitude 6.2 earthquake struck in the Antofagasta Region. There were no major injuries or damage in the nearby cities of Calama, Chile and San Pedro de Atacama.

== Eclipse timing ==
=== Places experiencing total eclipse ===
Solar Eclipse of July 11, 2010 (Local Times)
Country or territory	City or place	Start of partial eclipse	Start of total eclipse	Maximum eclipse	End of total eclipse	End of partial eclipse	Duration of totality (min:s)	Duration of eclipse (hr:min)	Maximum magnitude
Chile	Easter Island	12:40:42	14:08:37	14:11:01	14:13:24	15:34:27	4:47	2:54	1.0249
Argentina	El Calafate	16:44:13	17:48:31	17:49:54	17:51:18	18:04:08 (sunset)	2:47	1:20	1.0206

=== Places experiencing partial eclipse ===
Solar Eclipse of July 11, 2010 (Local Times)
Country or territory	City or place	Start of partial eclipse	Maximum eclipse	End of partial eclipse	Duration of eclipse (hr:min)	Maximum coverage
United States Minor Outlying Islands	Baker Island	05:47:34 (sunrise)	05:59:58	06:34:36	0:47	9.50%
Tokelau	Fakaofo (Note: The times listed for this location occur on July 12, 2010, local time.)	06:42:02 (sunrise)	07:03:40	08:00:49	1:19	44.12%
United States Minor Outlying Islands	Palmyra Atoll	07:28:40	08:04:30	08:43:06	1:14	8.96%
Samoa	Apia	06:51:49 (sunrise)	07:05:48	08:06:41	1:15	58.75%
American Samoa	Pago Pago	06:48:18 (sunrise)	07:06:26	08:08:35	1:20	61.82%
Kiribati	Kiritimati	07:18:32	08:08:15	09:03:34	1:45	24.29%
Niue	Alofi	06:53:34 (sunrise)	07:10:05	08:15:40	1:22	79.64%
Wallis and Futuna	Mata Utu	06:08:29 (sunrise)	06:10:51	07:01:06	0:53	49.01%
Cook Islands	Rarotonga	07:16:59 (sunrise)	08:18:36	09:32:52	2:16	99.64%
Tonga	Nuku'alofa	07:18:29 (sunrise)	07:20:58	08:12:35	0:54	70.00%
Tuvalu	Funafuti	06:19:02 (sunrise)	06:22:23	06:48:50	0:30	19.13%
French Polynesia	Papeete	07:15:53	08:27:21	09:50:05	2:34	98.79%
Fiji	Tubou	06:27:39 (sunrise)	06:30:05	07:05:37	0:38	41.58%
Fiji	Suva	06:38:32 (sunrise)	06:41:28	07:03:18	0:25	21.60%
Pitcairn Islands	Adamstown	09:50:36	11:16:34	12:48:02	2:57	83.33%
New Zealand	Chatham Islands	08:03:26 (sunrise)	08:07:33	08:23:17	0:20	12.66%
Falkland Islands	Stanley	15:52:42	15:56:33	16:00:21 (sunset)	0:08	1.86%
Chile	Punta Arenas	15:43:05	16:41:01	16:45:26 (sunset)	1:02	88.67%
Argentina	Río Gallegos	16:45:35	17:41:57	17:46:08 (sunset)	1:01	87.21%
Uruguay	Montevideo	17:15:27	17:46:23	17:49:14 (sunset)	0:34	24.59%
Peru	Lima	15:24:17	15:52:19	16:18:59	0:55	2.77%
Argentina	Comodoro Rivadavia	16:52:02	17:55:44	18:02:29 (sunset)	1:10	84.50%
Argentina	Buenos Aires	17:13:47	17:55:52	17:58:43 (sunset)	0:45	32.86%
Argentina	Bariloche	16:52:24	17:57:16	18:32:59 (sunset)	1:41	75.25%
Argentina	Rawson	16:56:36	17:58:14	18:01:34 (sunset)	1:05	72.86%
Chile	Santiago	16:00:27	17:00:53	17:50:36 (sunset)	1:50	49.14%
Bolivia	La Paz	16:39:13	17:01:27	17:22:50	0:44	1.79%
Brazil	Uruguaiana	17:23:38	18:01:55	18:04:34 (sunset)	0:41	18.73%
Bolivia	Sucre	16:37:17	17:03:44	17:29:00	0:52	3.31%
Paraguay	Asunción	16:33:14	17:06:29	17:16:03 (sunset)	0:43	8.53%

== Eclipse details ==
Shown below are two tables displaying details about this particular solar eclipse. The first table outlines times at which the moon's penumbra or umbra attains the specific parameter, and the second table describes various other parameters pertaining to this eclipse.

July 11, 2010 Solar Eclipse Times
Event	Time (UTC)
First Penumbral External Contact	2010 July 11 at 17:10:44.0 UTC
First Umbral External Contact	2010 July 11 at 18:16:18.5 UTC
First Central Line	2010 July 11 at 18:17:56.9 UTC
First Umbral Internal Contact	2010 July 11 at 18:19:36.2 UTC
Greatest Duration	2010 July 11 at 19:32:32.2 UTC
Greatest Eclipse	2010 July 11 at 19:34:37.9 UTC
Ecliptic Conjunction	2010 July 11 at 19:41:33.7 UTC
Equatorial Conjunction	2010 July 11 at 19:52:01.5 UTC
Last Umbral Internal Contact	2010 July 11 at 20:49:26.0 UTC
Last Central Line	2010 July 11 at 20:51:07.2 UTC
Last Umbral External Contact	2010 July 11 at 20:52:47.5 UTC
Last Penumbral External Contact	2010 July 11 at 21:58:20.8 UTC

July 11, 2010 Solar Eclipse Parameters
Parameter	Value
Eclipse Magnitude	1.05805
Eclipse Obscuration	1.11946
Gamma	−0.67877
Sun Right Ascension	07h23m57.6s
Sun Declination	+22°02'11.0"
Sun Semi-Diameter	15'43.9"
Sun Equatorial Horizontal Parallax	08.7"
Moon Right Ascension	07h23m15.8s
Moon Declination	+21°22'29.3"
Moon Semi-Diameter	16'26.6"
Moon Equatorial Horizontal Parallax	1°00'20.9"
ΔT	66.2 s

== Eclipse season ==
This eclipse is part of an eclipse season, a period, roughly every six months, when eclipses occur. Only two (or occasionally three) eclipse seasons occur each year, and each season lasts about 35 days and repeats just short of six months (173 days) later; thus two full eclipse seasons always occur each year. Either two or three eclipses happen each eclipse season. In the sequence below, each eclipse is separated by a fortnight.

Eclipse season of June–July 2010
June 26 Ascending node (full moon)	July 11 Descending node (new moon)
Partial lunar eclipse Lunar Saros 120	Total solar eclipse Solar Saros 146

== Related eclipses ==
=== Eclipses in 2010 ===
- An annular solar eclipse on January 15.
- A partial lunar eclipse on June 26.
- A total solar eclipse on July 11.
- A total lunar eclipse on December 21.

=== Metonic ===
- Preceded by: Solar eclipse of September 22, 2006
- Followed by: Solar eclipse of April 29, 2014

=== Tzolkinex ===
- Preceded by: Solar eclipse of May 31, 2003
- Followed by: Solar eclipse of August 21, 2017

=== Half-Saros ===
- Preceded by: Lunar eclipse of July 5, 2001
- Followed by: Lunar eclipse of July 16, 2019

=== Tritos ===
- Preceded by: Solar eclipse of August 11, 1999
- Followed by: Solar eclipse of June 10, 2021

=== Solar Saros 146 ===
- Preceded by: Solar eclipse of June 30, 1992
- Followed by: Solar eclipse of July 22, 2028

=== Inex ===
- Preceded by: Solar eclipse of July 31, 1981
- Followed by: Solar eclipse of June 21, 2039

=== Triad ===
- Preceded by: Solar eclipse of September 10, 1923
- Followed by: Solar eclipse of May 11, 2097

=== Solar eclipses of 2008–2011 ===
This eclipse is a member of a semester series. An eclipse in a semester series of solar eclipses repeats approximately every 177 days and 4 hours (a semester) at alternating nodes of the Moon's orbit.

The partial solar eclipses on June 1, 2011 and November 25, 2011 occur in the next lunar year eclipse set.

Solar eclipse series sets from 2008 to 2011
Ascending node			Descending node		
Saros	Map	Gamma	Saros	Map	Gamma
121 Partial in Christchurch, New Zealand	February 7, 2008 Annular	−0.95701	126 Totality in Kumul, Xinjiang, China	August 1, 2008 Total	0.83070
131 Annularity in Palangka Raya, Indonesia	January 26, 2009 Annular	−0.28197	136 Totality in Kurigram District, Bangladesh	July 22, 2009 Total	0.06977
141 Annularity in Jinan, Shandong, China	January 15, 2010 Annular	0.40016	146 Totality in Hao, French Polynesia	July 11, 2010 Total	−0.67877
151 Partial in Poland	January 4, 2011 Partial	1.06265	156	July 1, 2011 Partial	−1.49171

=== Saros 146 ===
This eclipse is a part of Saros series 146, repeating every 18 years, 11 days, and containing 76 events. The series started with a partial solar eclipse on September 19, 1541. It contains total eclipses from May 29, 1938 through October 7, 2154; hybrid eclipses from October 17, 2172 through November 20, 2226; and annular eclipses from November 30, 2244 through August 10, 2659. The series ends at member 76 as a partial eclipse on December 29, 2893. Its eclipses are tabulated in three columns; every third eclipse in the same column is one exeligmos apart, so they all cast shadows over approximately the same parts of the Earth.

The longest duration of totality was produced by member 26 at 5 minutes, 21 seconds on June 30, 1992, and the longest duration of annularity will be produced by member 63 at 3 minutes, 30 seconds on August 10, 2659. All eclipses in this series occur at the Moon’s descending node of orbit.

Series members 16–37 occur between 1801 and 2200:
16	17	18
March 13, 1812	March 24, 1830	April 3, 1848
19	20	21
April 15, 1866	April 25, 1884	May 7, 1902
22	23	24
May 18, 1920	May 29, 1938	June 8, 1956
25	26	27
June 20, 1974	June 30, 1992	July 11, 2010
28	29	30
July 22, 2028	August 2, 2046	August 12, 2064
31	32	33
August 24, 2082	September 4, 2100	September 15, 2118
34	35	36
September 26, 2136	October 7, 2154	October 17, 2172
37
October 29, 2190

=== Metonic series ===
The metonic series repeats eclipses every 19 years (6939.69 days), lasting about 5 cycles. Eclipses occur in nearly the same calendar date. In addition, the octon subseries repeats 1/5 of that or every 3.8 years (1387.94 days). All eclipses in this table occur at the Moon's descending node.

21 eclipse events between July 11, 1953 and July 11, 2029
July 10–11	April 29–30	February 15–16	December 4	September 21–23
116	118	120	122	124
July 11, 1953	April 30, 1957	February 15, 1961	December 4, 1964	September 22, 1968
126	128	130	132	134
July 10, 1972	April 29, 1976	February 16, 1980	December 4, 1983	September 23, 1987
136	138	140	142	144
July 11, 1991	April 29, 1995	February 16, 1999	December 4, 2002	September 22, 2006
146	148	150	152	154
July 11, 2010	April 29, 2014	February 15, 2018	December 4, 2021	September 21, 2025
156
July 11, 2029

=== Tritos series ===
This eclipse is a part of a tritos cycle, repeating at alternating nodes every 135 synodic months (≈ 3986.63 days, or 11 years minus 1 month). Their appearance and longitude are irregular due to a lack of synchronization with the anomalistic month (period of perigee), but groupings of 3 tritos cycles (≈ 33 years minus 3 months) come close (≈ 434.044 anomalistic months), so eclipses are similar in these groupings.

Series members between 1801 and 2200
February 21, 1803 (Saros 127)	January 21, 1814 (Saros 128)	December 20, 1824 (Saros 129)	November 20, 1835 (Saros 130)	October 20, 1846 (Saros 131)
September 18, 1857 (Saros 132)	August 18, 1868 (Saros 133)	July 19, 1879 (Saros 134)	June 17, 1890 (Saros 135)	May 18, 1901 (Saros 136)
April 17, 1912 (Saros 137)	March 17, 1923 (Saros 138)	February 14, 1934 (Saros 139)	January 14, 1945 (Saros 140)	December 14, 1955 (Saros 141)
November 12, 1966 (Saros 142)	October 12, 1977 (Saros 143)	September 11, 1988 (Saros 144)	August 11, 1999 (Saros 145)	July 11, 2010 (Saros 146)
June 10, 2021 (Saros 147)	May 9, 2032 (Saros 148)	April 9, 2043 (Saros 149)	March 9, 2054 (Saros 150)	February 5, 2065 (Saros 151)
January 6, 2076 (Saros 152)	December 6, 2086 (Saros 153)	November 4, 2097 (Saros 154)	October 5, 2108 (Saros 155)	September 5, 2119 (Saros 156)
August 4, 2130 (Saros 157)	July 3, 2141 (Saros 158)	June 3, 2152 (Saros 159)		April 1, 2174 (Saros 161)

=== Inex series ===
This eclipse is a part of the long period inex cycle, repeating at alternating nodes, every 358 synodic months (≈ 10,571.95 days, or 29 years minus 20 days). Their appearance and longitude are irregular due to a lack of synchronization with the anomalistic month (period of perigee). However, groupings of 3 inex cycles (≈ 87 years minus 2 months) comes close (≈ 1,151.02 anomalistic months), so eclipses are similar in these groupings.

Series members between 1801 and 2200
November 29, 1807 (Saros 139)	November 9, 1836 (Saros 140)	October 19, 1865 (Saros 141)
September 29, 1894 (Saros 142)	September 10, 1923 (Saros 143)	August 20, 1952 (Saros 144)
July 31, 1981 (Saros 145)	July 11, 2010 (Saros 146)	June 21, 2039 (Saros 147)
May 31, 2068 (Saros 148)	May 11, 2097 (Saros 149)	April 22, 2126 (Saros 150)
April 2, 2155 (Saros 151)	March 12, 2184 (Saros 152)	
