= Solar eclipse of June 10, 2021 =

Annular solar eclipse

- Annular eclipse
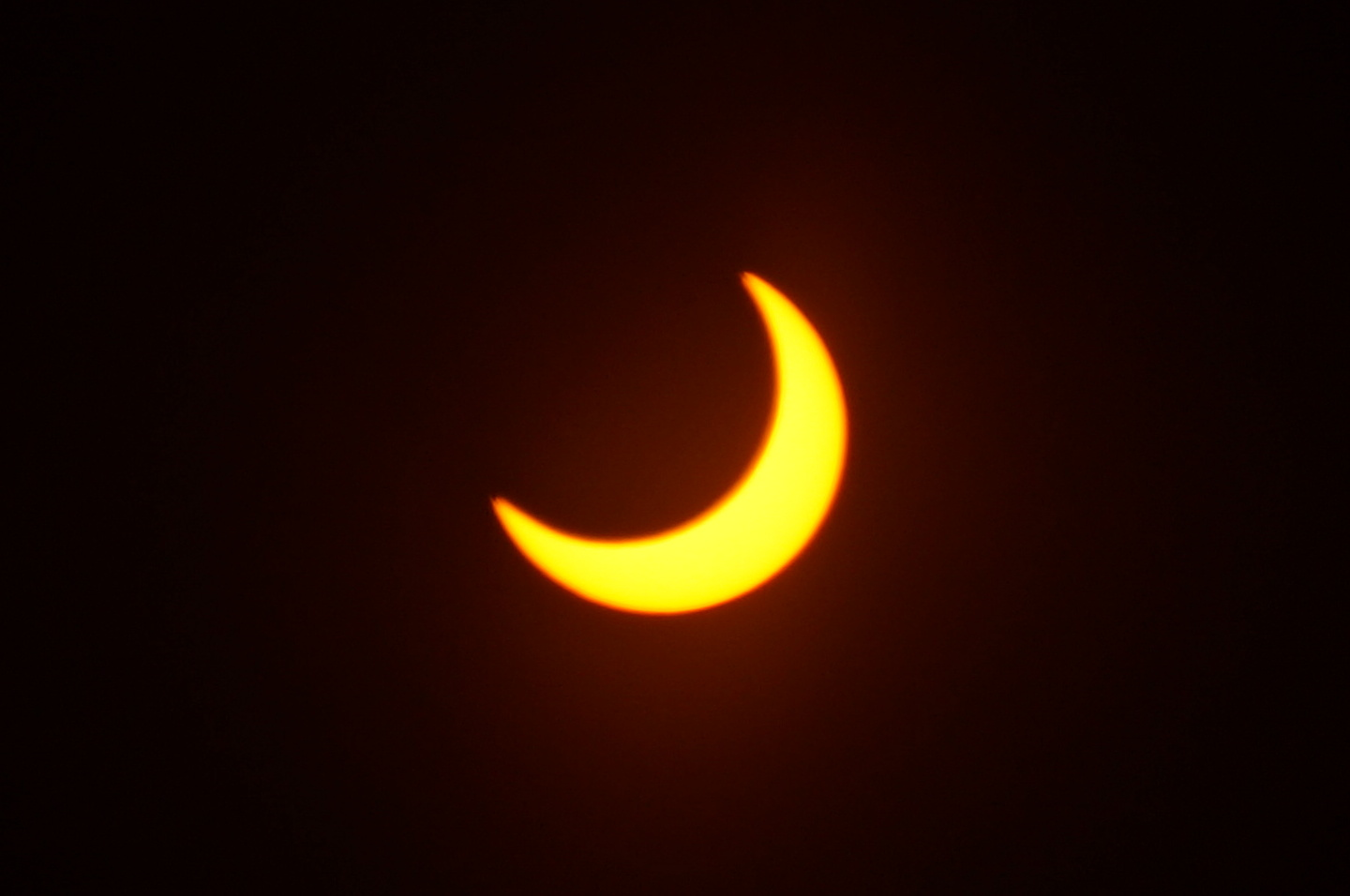
- Partial from Halifax, Canada

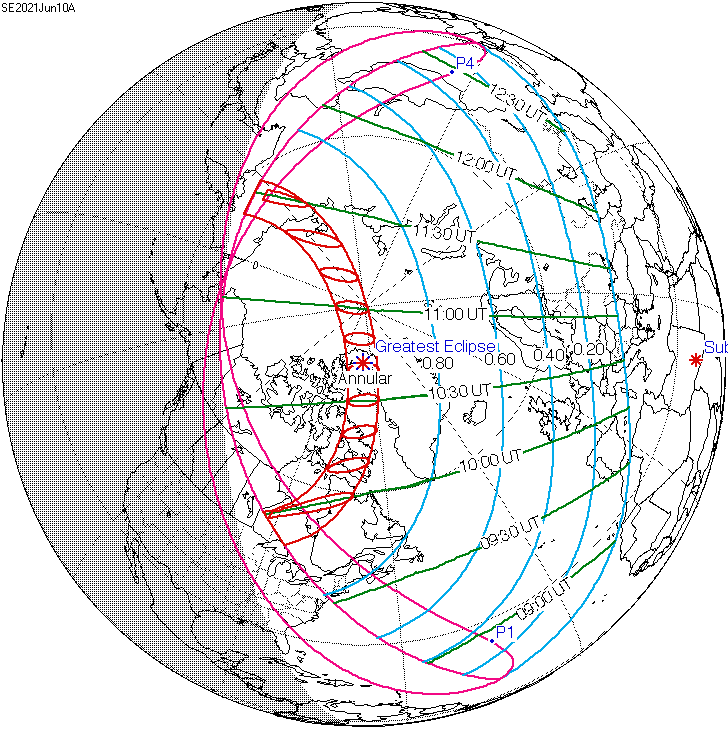
- Map
- Gamma: 0.9152
- Magnitude: 0.9435

Maximum eclipse
- Duration: 231 s (3 min 51 s)
- Coordinates: 80.8°N 66.8°W
- Max. width of band: 527 km (327 mi)

Times (UTC)
- Greatest eclipse: 10:43:07

References
- Saros: 147 (23 of 80)
- Catalog # (SE5000): 9555

An annular solar eclipse occurred at the Moon’s ascending node of orbit on Thursday, June 10, 2021, with a magnitude of 0.9435. A solar eclipse occurs when the Moon passes between Earth and the Sun, thereby totally or partly obscuring the Sun for a viewer on Earth. An annular solar eclipse occurs when the Moon's apparent diameter is smaller than the Sun's, blocking most of the Sun's light and causing the Sun to look like an annulus (ring). An annular eclipse appears as a partial eclipse over a region of the Earth thousands of kilometres wide. Occurring about 2.3 days after apogee (on June 8, 2021, at 3:30 UTC), the Moon's apparent diameter was smaller.

The annular eclipse was visible from parts of northeastern Canada (particularly Ontario and Nunavut), Greenland, the Arctic Ocean (passing over the North Pole), and the Russian Far East. A partial eclipse was visible for parts of northern North America, Europe, and North Asia.

== Path ==
Animated image showing the path of the eclipse shadows.

The annular eclipse started at 09:55 UTC for 3 minutes 37 seconds along the northern shore of Lake Superior in Ontario, Canada. The path of the antumbral shadow then headed across Hudson Bay through northwestern Quebec and the Hudson Strait to Baffin Island in Nunavut, where the town of Iqaluit saw 3 minutes and 5 seconds of annularity. After this, it then travelled across Baffin Bay and along the northwestern coast of Greenland, where the point of greatest eclipse occurred at 10:41 UTC in Nares Strait for 3 minutes 51 seconds. The shadow then crossed Ellesmere Island and the Arctic Ocean, passing over the North Pole (which was located away from the central line of the eclipse but saw 2 minutes and 36 seconds of annularity), before heading south towards northeastern Siberia, where the city of Srednekolymsk saw 3 minutes and 35 seconds of annularity at 11:27 UTC. Shortly afterwards, the central line of the annular eclipse ended at 11:29 UTC.

== Eclipse timing ==
=== Places experiencing annular eclipse ===
Solar Eclipse of June 10, 2021 (Local Times)
Country or territory	City or place	Start of partial eclipse	Start of annular eclipse	Maximum eclipse	End of annular eclipse	End of partial eclipse	Duration of annularity (min:s)	Duration of eclipse (hr:min)	Maximum coverage
Canada	Nipigon	05:48:58 (sunrise)	05:51:06	05:52:59	05:54:17	06:50:17	3:11	1:01	88.01%
Canada	Pickle Lake	04:44:16 (sunrise)	04:55:27	04:57:07	04:58:46	05:54:55	3:19	1:11	88.07%
Canada	Sanikiluaq	05:00:36	05:56:51	05:58:42	06:00:32	07:00:09	3:41	2:00	88.47%
Canada	Inukjuak	05:02:32	05:59:30	06:01:20	06:03:10	07:03:30	3:40	2:01	88.56%
Canada	Salluit	05:06:39	06:05:08	06:06:55	06:08:41	07:10:27	3:33	2:04	88.72%
Canada	Iqaluit	05:06:06	06:06:31	06:08:03	06:09:35	07:13:32	3:04	2:07	88.89%
Canada	Kinngait	05:10:07	06:09:22	06:10:45	06:12:08	07:14:30	2:46	2:04	88.75%
Canada	Pangnirtung	05:09:13	06:10:57	06:12:15	06:13:32	07:18:43	2:35	2:10	88.99%
Canada	Qikiqtarjuaq	05:11:14	06:13:47	06:14:52	06:15:57	07:21:52	2:10	2:11	89.05%
Canada	Clyde River	05:17:35	06:19:10	06:21:04	06:22:58	07:27:26	3:48	2:10	89.02%
Greenland	Savissivik	07:27:03	08:30:11	08:32:05	08:34:00	09:39:21	3:49	2:12	89.14%
Greenland	Pituffik	06:28:33	07:31:23	07:33:15	07:35:06	08:40:01	3:43	2:11	89.11%
Greenland	Qaanaaq	07:30:22	08:33:20	08:35:10	08:37:00	09:41:55	3:40	2:12	89.11%
Canada	Alert	05:39:27	06:43:43	06:45:32	06:47:21	07:52:51	3:38	2:13	89.19%
Russia	Chokurdakh	21:26:47	22:25:01	22:26:49	22:28:37	23:25:19	3:36	1:59	88.45%
Russia	Srednekolymsk	21:28:45	22:25:21	22:27:08	22:28:55	23:24:04	3:34	1:55	88.27%
Russia	Belaya Gora	21:30:21	22:28:28	22:29:54	22:31:20	23:27:47	2:52	1:57	88.39%
Russia	Zyryanka	21:32:10	22:28:38	22:30:17	22:31:57	23:26:49	3:19	1:55	88.22%

=== Places experiencing partial eclipse ===
Solar Eclipse of June 10, 2021 (Local Times)
Country or territory	City or place	Start of partial eclipse	Maximum eclipse	End of partial eclipse	Duration of eclipse (hr:min)	Maximum coverage
Bermuda	Hamilton	06:11:49 (sunrise)	06:16:17	07:11:58	1:00	51.35%
United States	New York City	05:24:33 (sunrise)	05:32:49	06:30:53	1:06	72.55%
Saint Pierre and Miquelon	Saint-Pierre	06:35:14	07:34:28	08:38:49	2:04	67.08%
Canada	Montreal	05:05:27 (sunrise)	05:39:13	06:39:01	1:34	78.90%
Canada	Toronto	05:35:48 (sunrise)	05:40:01	06:37:59	1:02	80.16%
United States	Washington, D.C.	05:42:24 (sunrise)	05:47:51	06:29:15	0:47	55.10%
Greenland	Nuuk	07:02:31	08:07:48	09:17:19	2:15	81.70%
Ireland	Dublin	10:01:18	11:08:43	12:21:40	2:20	28.56%
France	Paris	11:12:47	12:11:57	13:15:23	2:03	13.17%
Isle of Man	Douglas	10:04:31	11:12:34	12:25:52	2:21	28.62%
United Kingdom	London	10:08:49	11:13:18	12:22:34	2:14	19.98%
Iceland	Reykjavík	09:06:16	10:17:10	11:32:41	2:26	60.53%
Belgium	Brussels	11:17:05	12:19:16	13:25:24	2:08	15.43%
Netherlands	Amsterdam	11:18:22	12:22:57	13:31:22	2:13	18.04%
Faroe Islands	Tórshavn	10:12:20	11:24:51	12:41:33	2:29	45.94%
Norway	Oslo	11:30:35	12:42:50	13:57:08	2:27	30.98%
Sweden	Stockholm	11:41:55	12:53:21	14:05:25	2:24	26.61%
Svalbard and Jan Mayen	Longyearbyen	11:46:24	12:58:44	14:11:14	2:25	71.03%
Estonia	Tallinn	12:52:58	14:03:54	15:14:09	2:21	25.06%
Finland	Helsinki	12:52:40	14:04:17	15:15:08	2:22	26.79%
Finland	Rovaniemi	12:50:39	14:05:14	15:19:05	2:28	42.35%
Russia	Pevek	22:18:37	23:16:16	00:13:03 (Note: The time listed here for this location occurs on June 11, 2021, local time.)	1:54	85.59%
Russia	Moscow	13:22:23	14:26:26	15:27:35	2:05	15.66%
Russia	Tiksi	19:30:01	20:32:36	21:33:05	2:03	85.00%
Russia	Verkhoyansk	20:36:01	21:36:50	22:35:28	1:59	84.26%
Russia	Yakutsk	19:46:08	20:45:41	21:42:40	1:57	77.39%
China	Mohe	19:03:48	20:00:38	20:14:01 (sunset)	1:10	60.72%
China	Hulunbuir	19:11:29	20:00:58	20:05:03 (sunset)	0:54	51.05%
Russia	Irkutsk	19:11:55	20:09:52	21:04:03	1:52	45.22%
Mongolia	Ulaanbaatar	19:20:09	20:14:54	20:50:25 (sunset)	1:30	39.76%

== Gallery ==
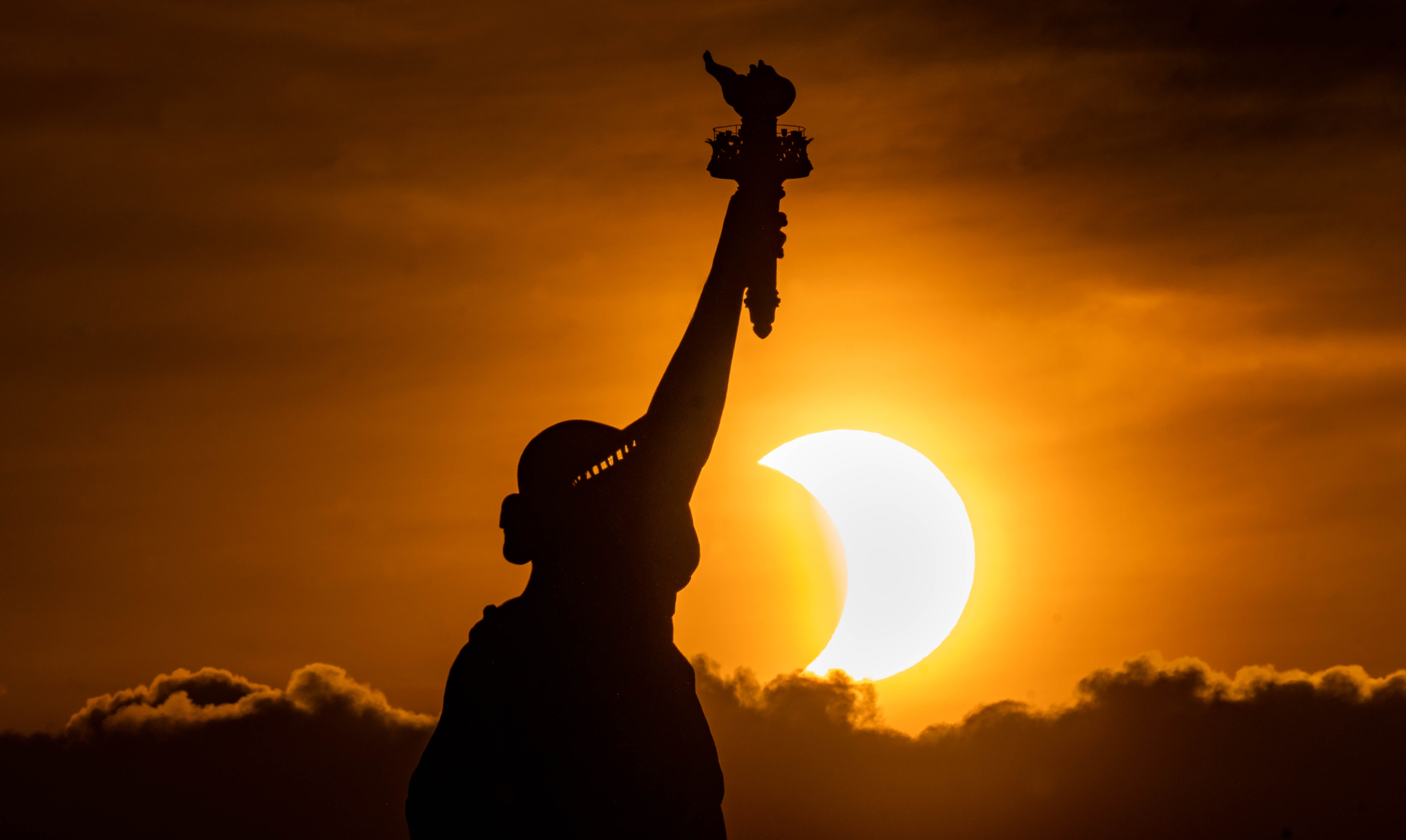
Eclipse over the Statue of Liberty in New York City

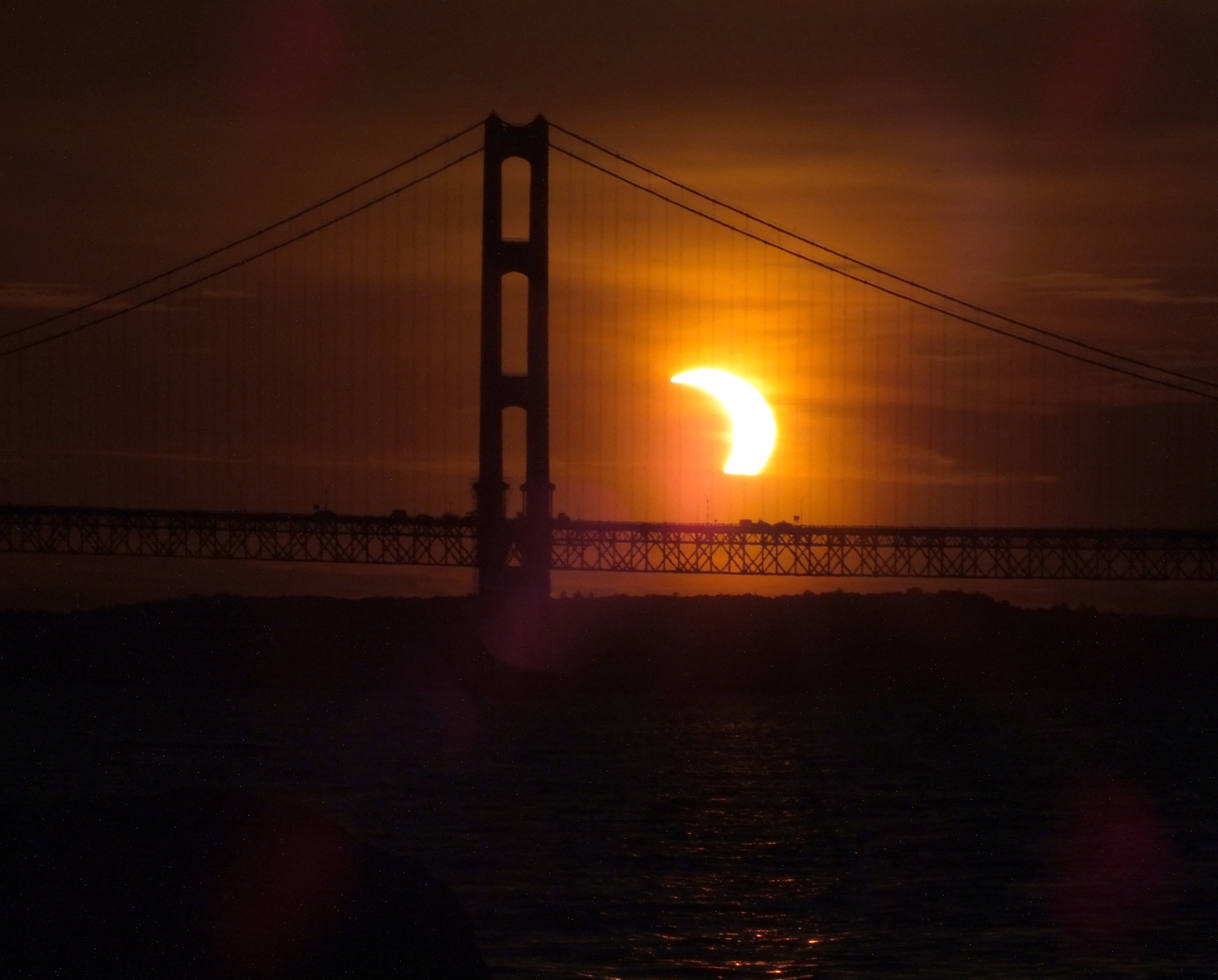
Eclipse behind Mackinac Bridge in Michigan

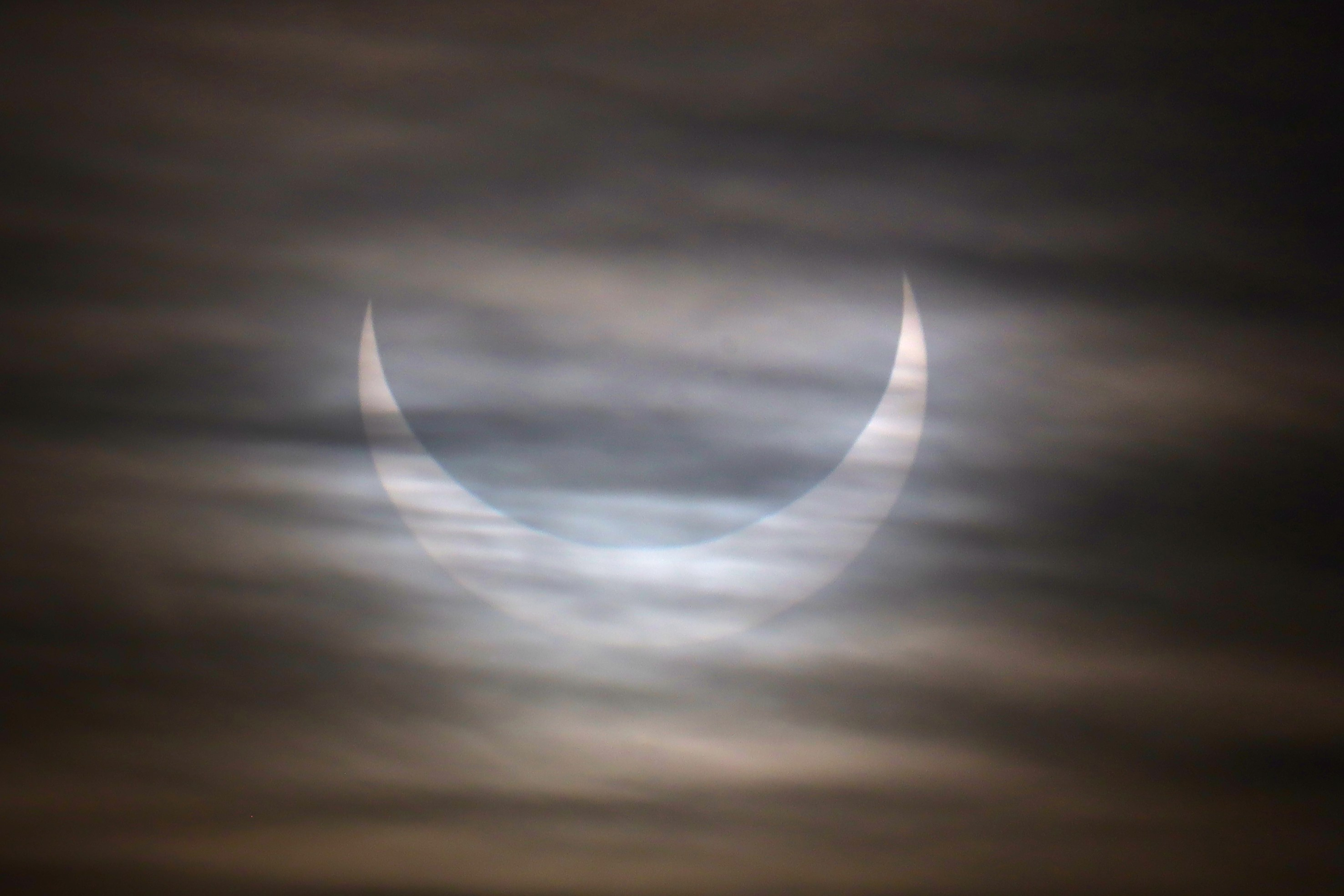
Montpelier, Vermont, 9:33 UTC

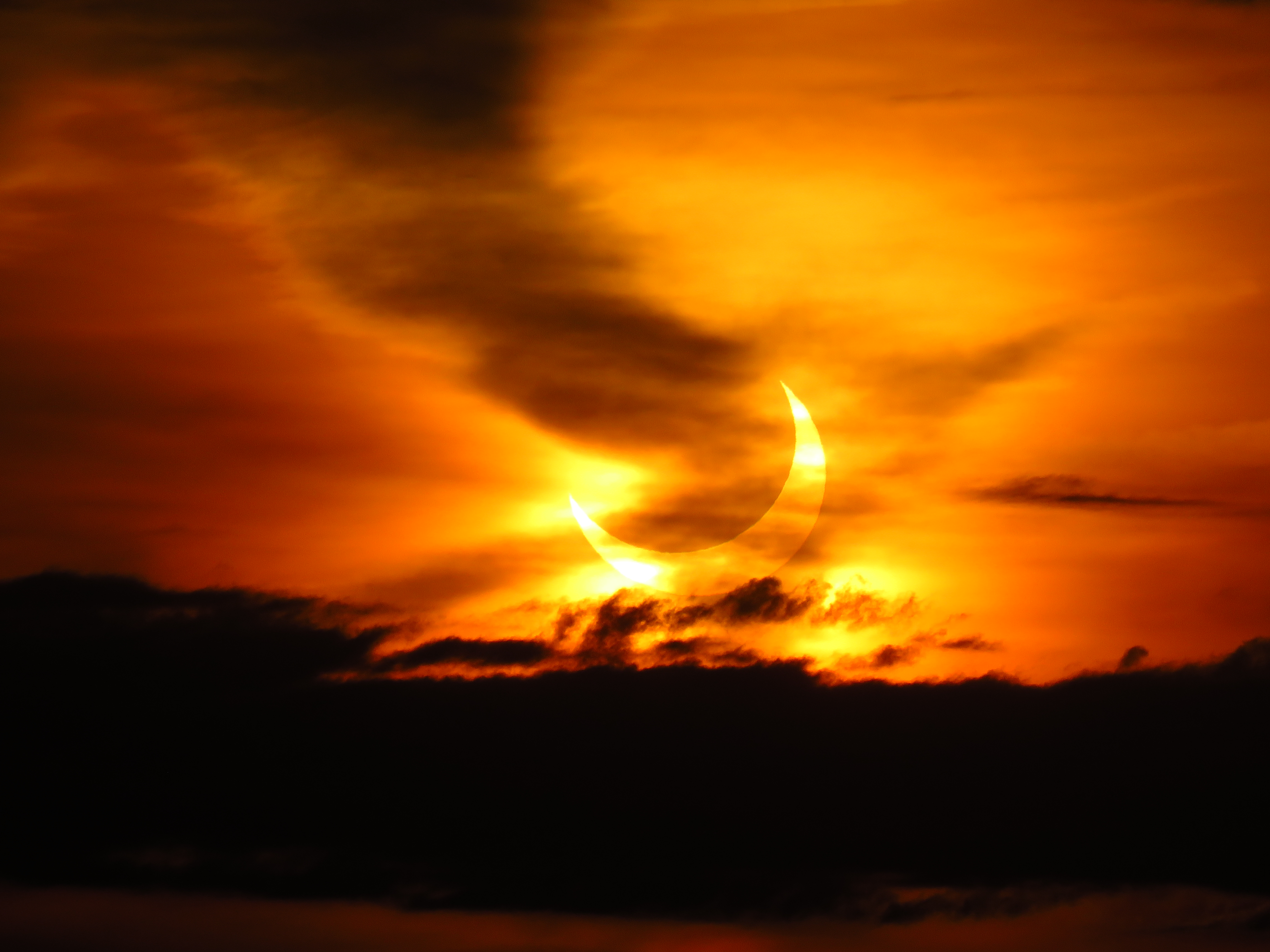
Killingly, Connecticut, 9:35 UTC

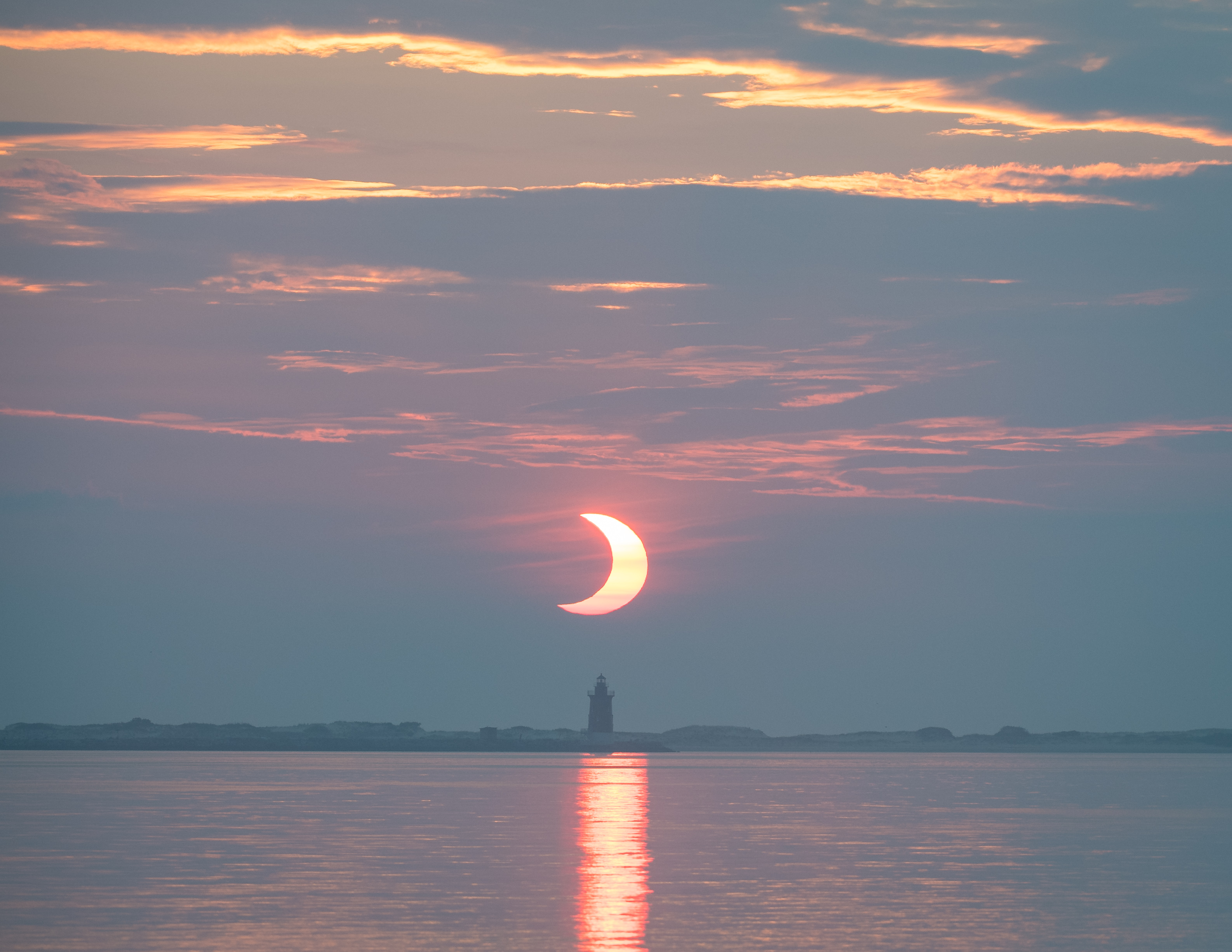
Lewes, Delaware, 9:42 UTC

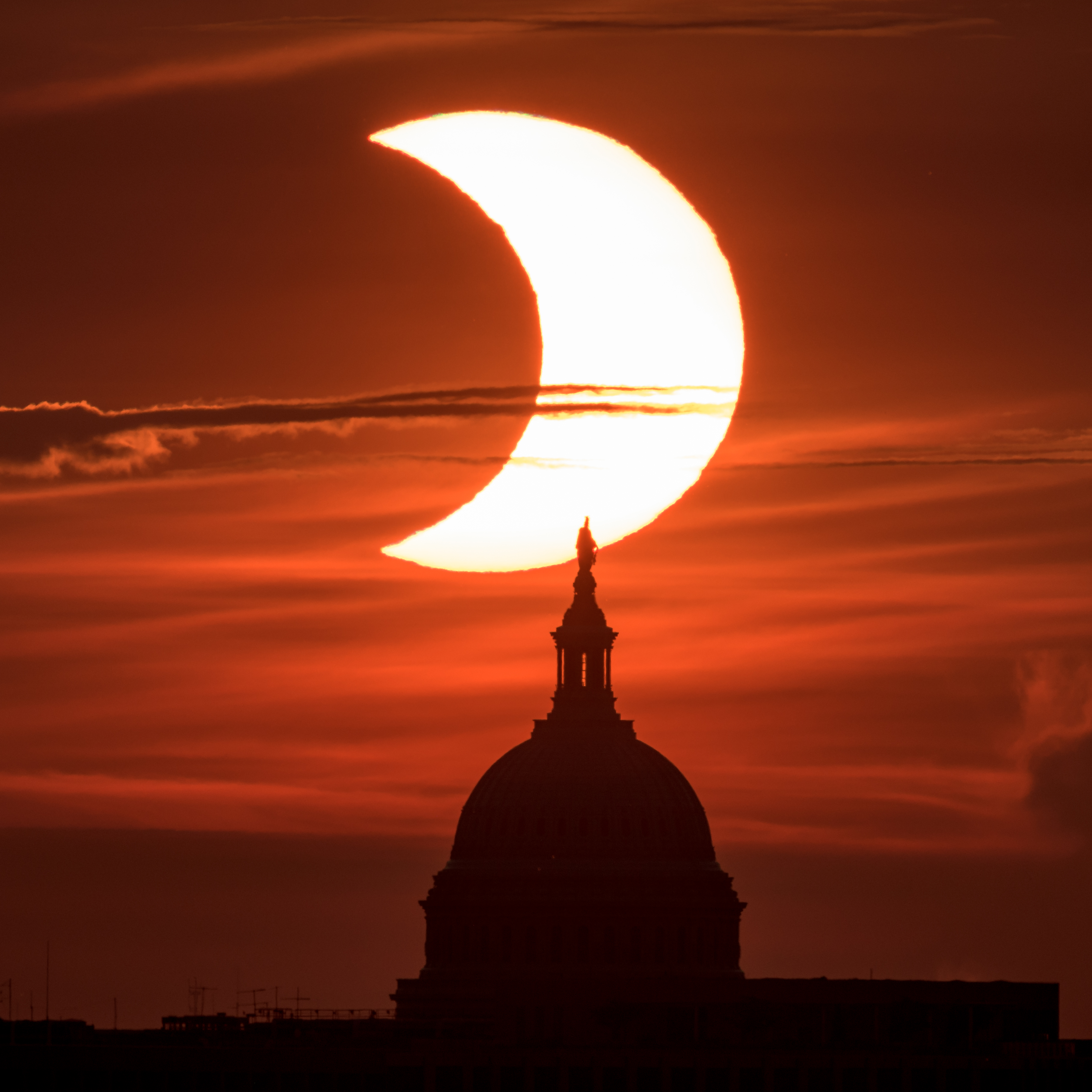
Arlington, Virginia, 9:56 UTC

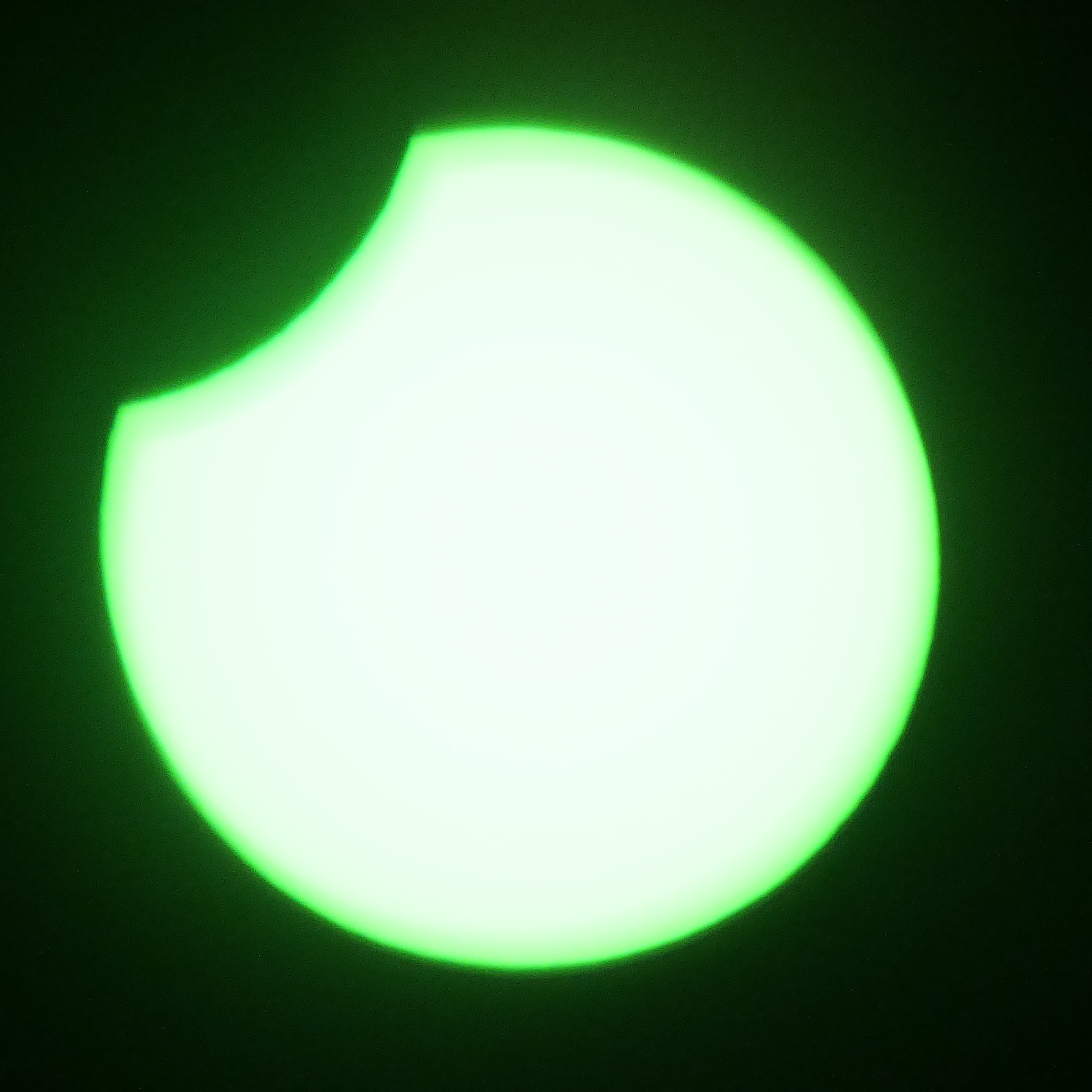
Logroño, Spain, 10:10 UTC

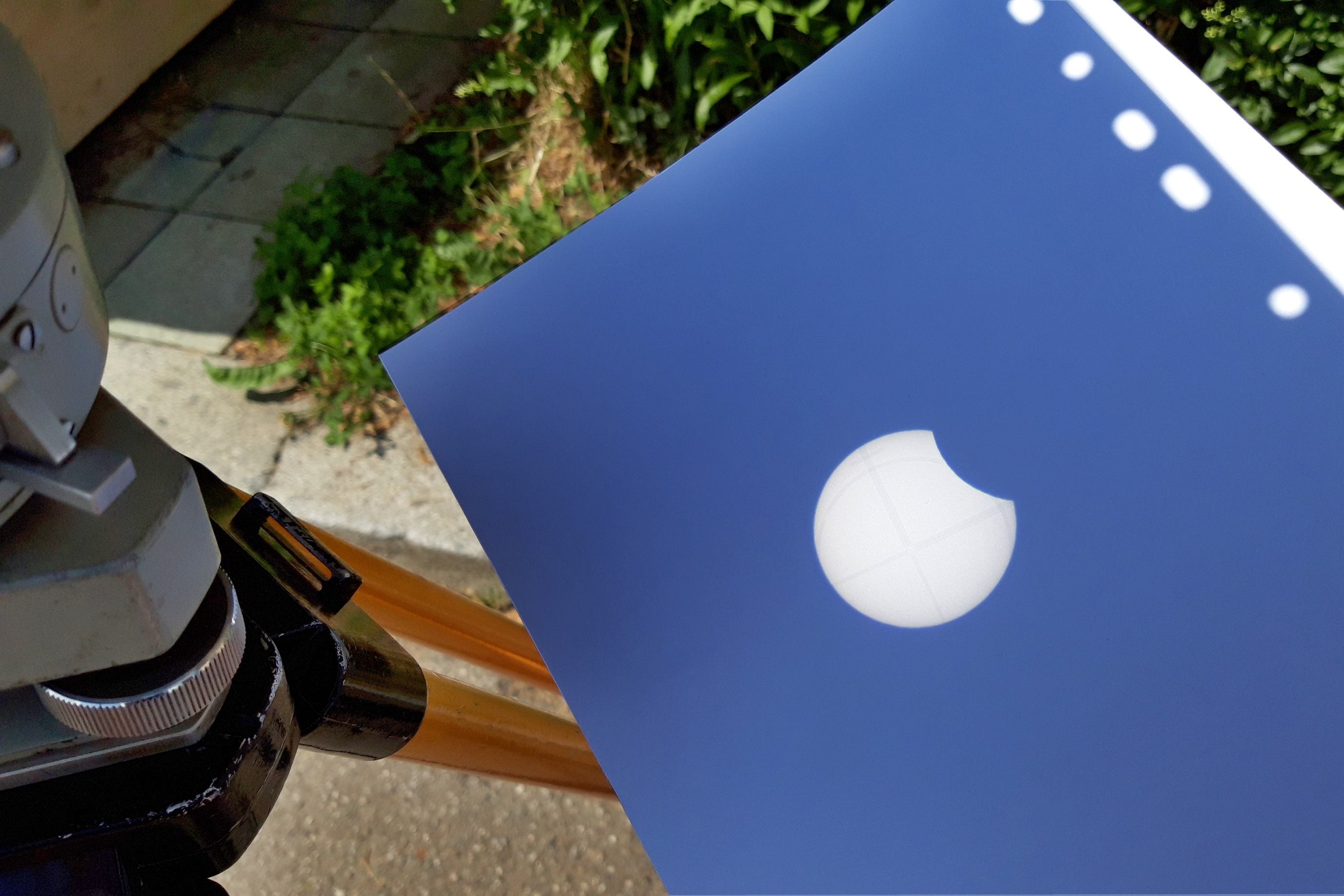
Projection from Prague, Czechia, 10:24 UTC

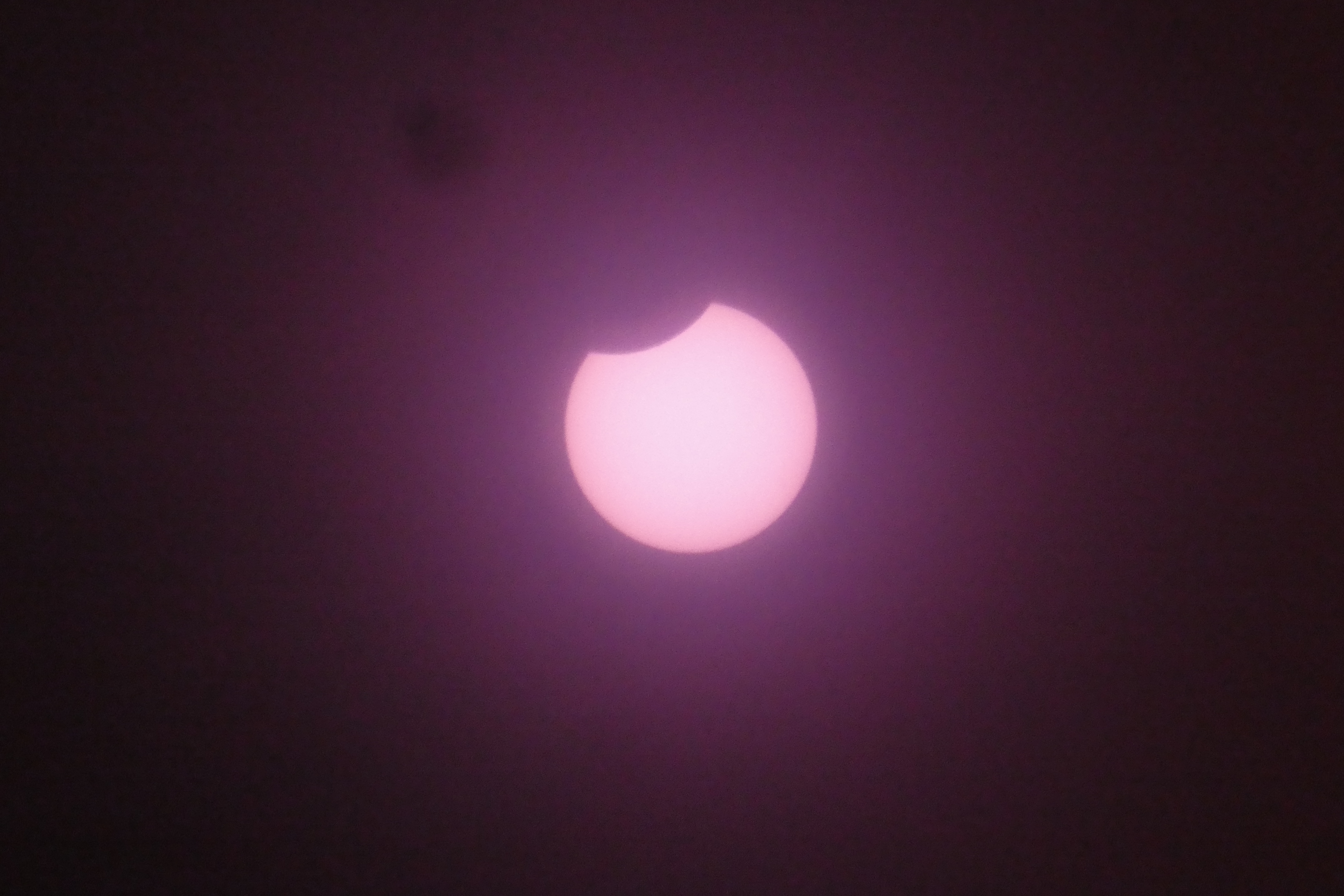
Haut-Doubs, France, 10:26 UTC

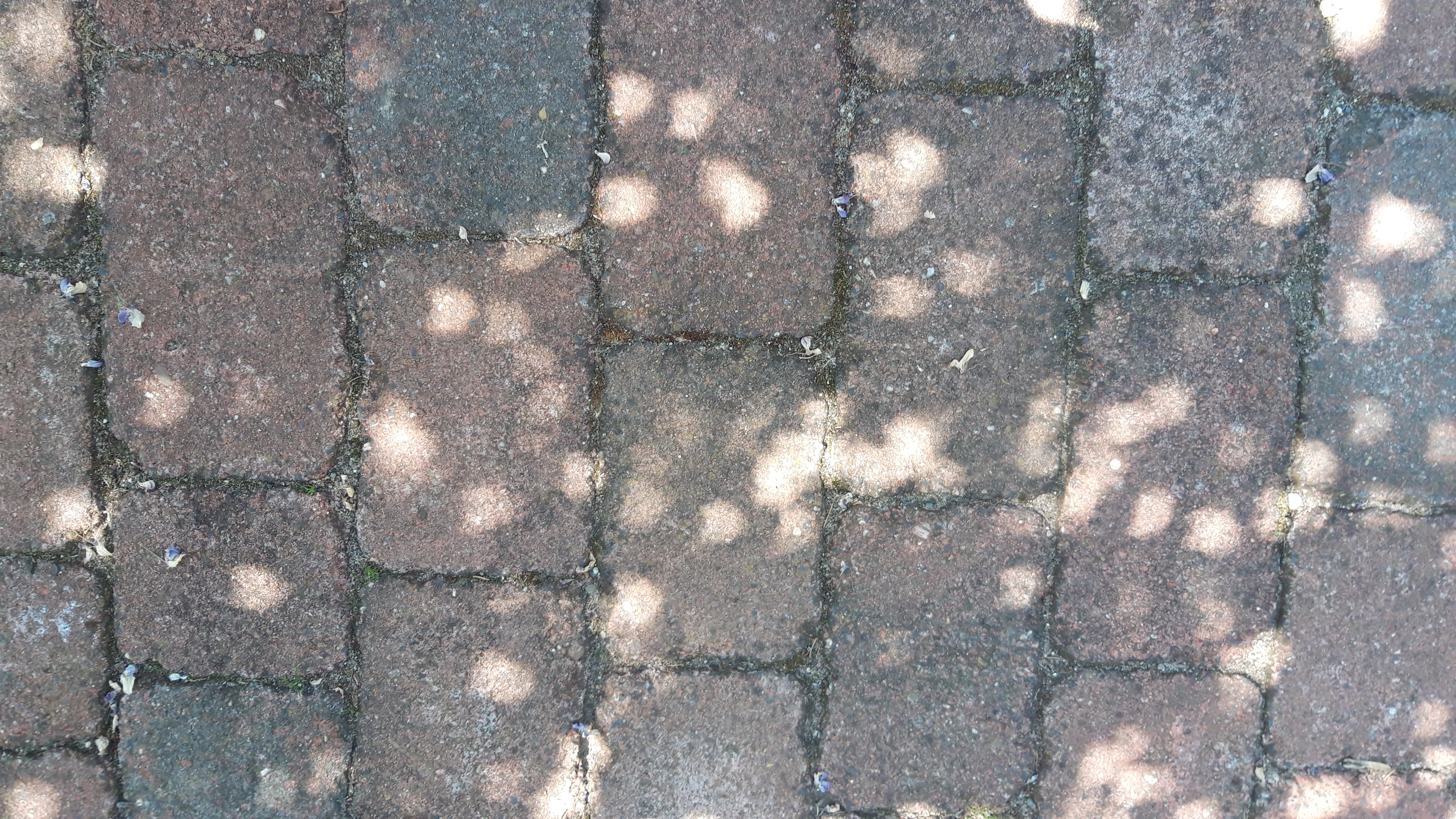
Projection through leaves in Woerden, Netherlands, 10:30 UTC

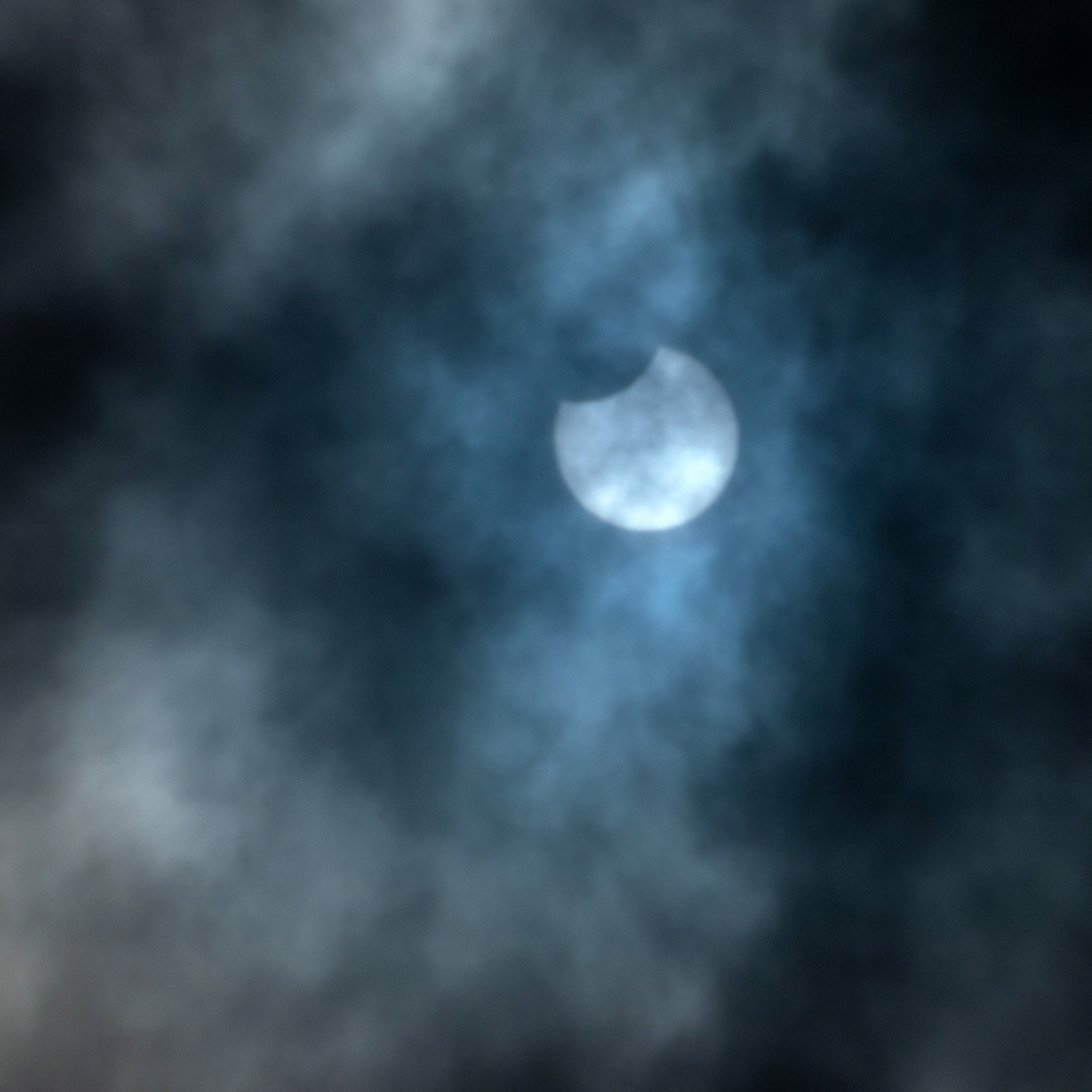
Brastad, Sweden, 10:32 UTC

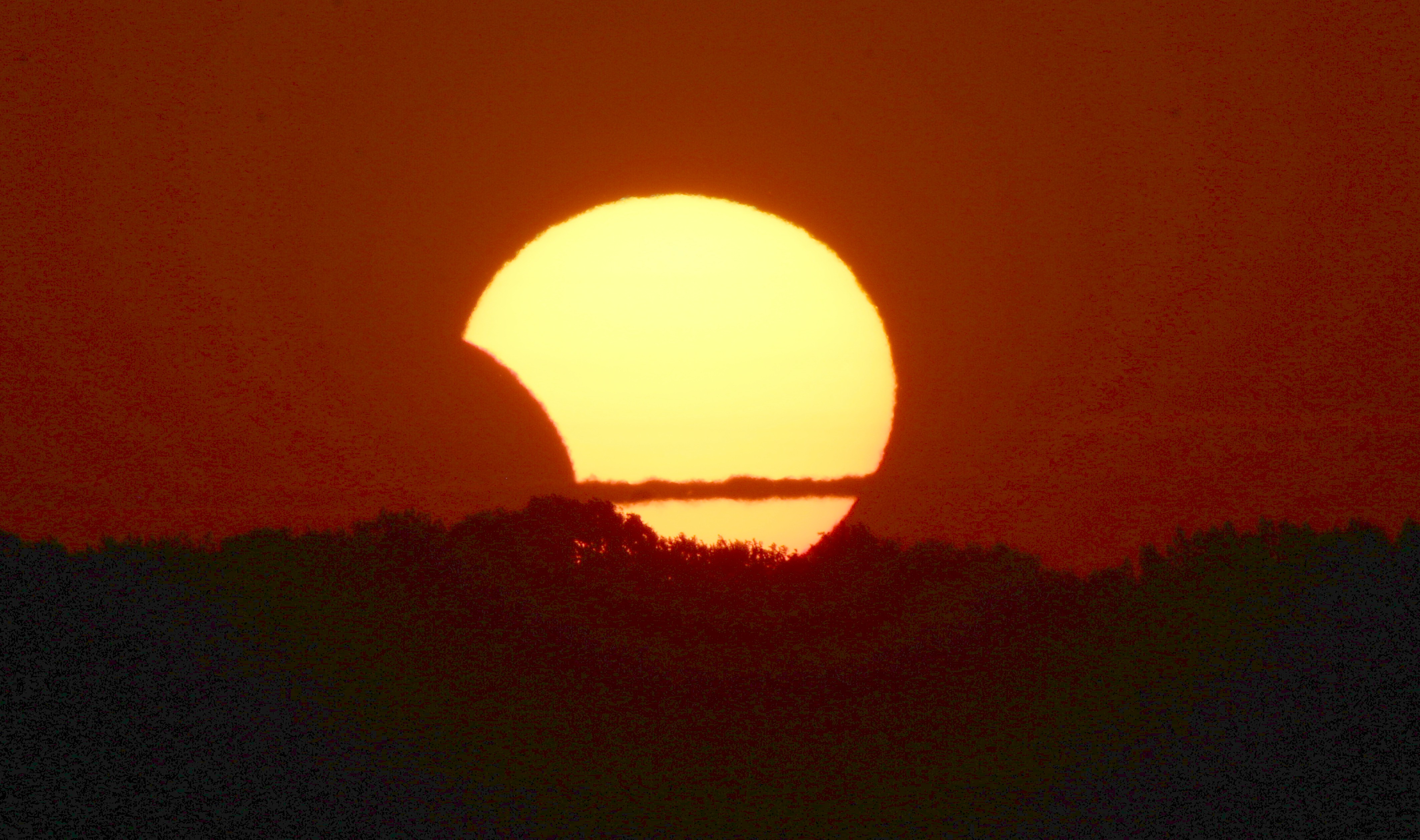
Lino Lakes, Minnesota, 10:33 UTC

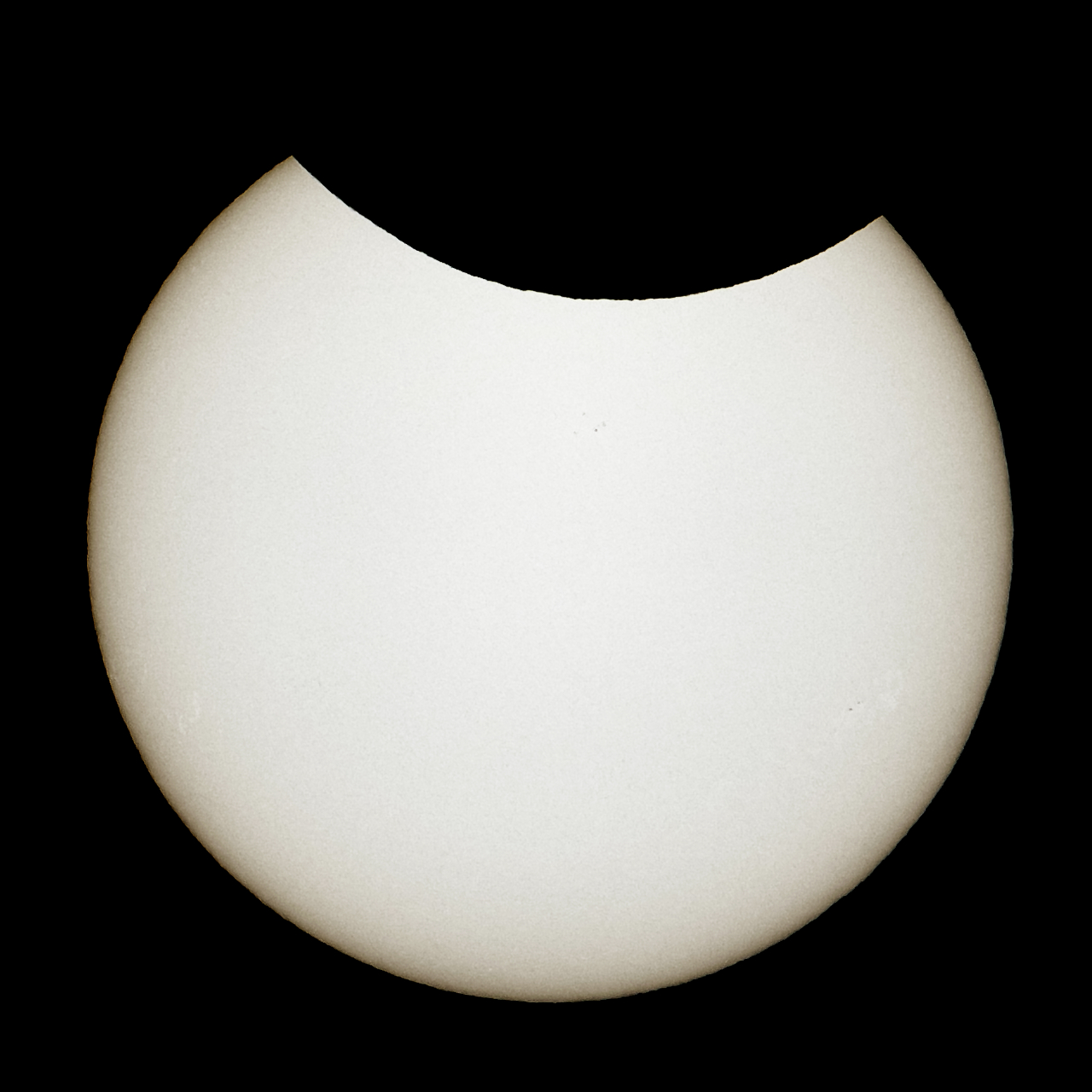
Berlin, Germany, 10:38 UTC

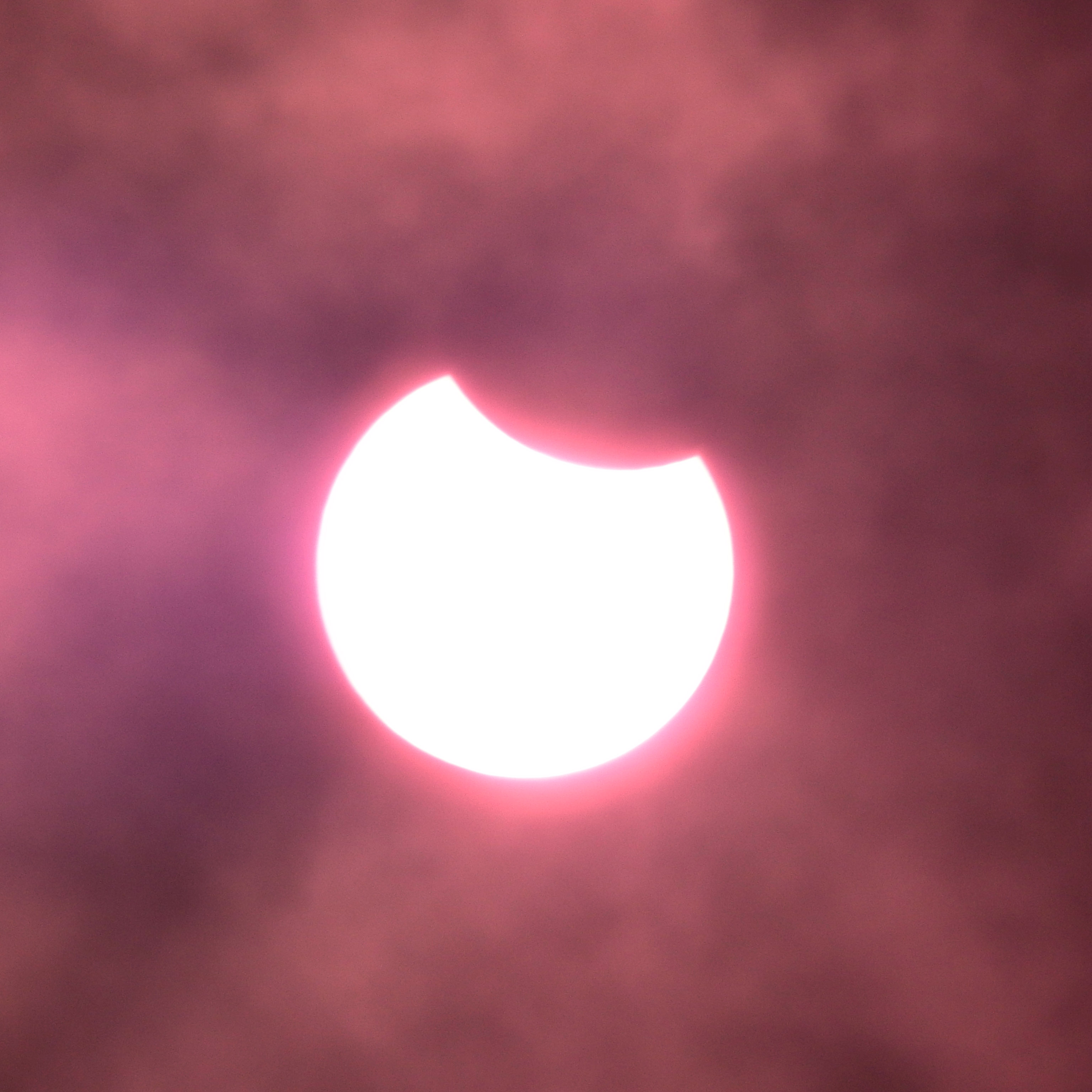
Beccles, England, 10:48 UTC

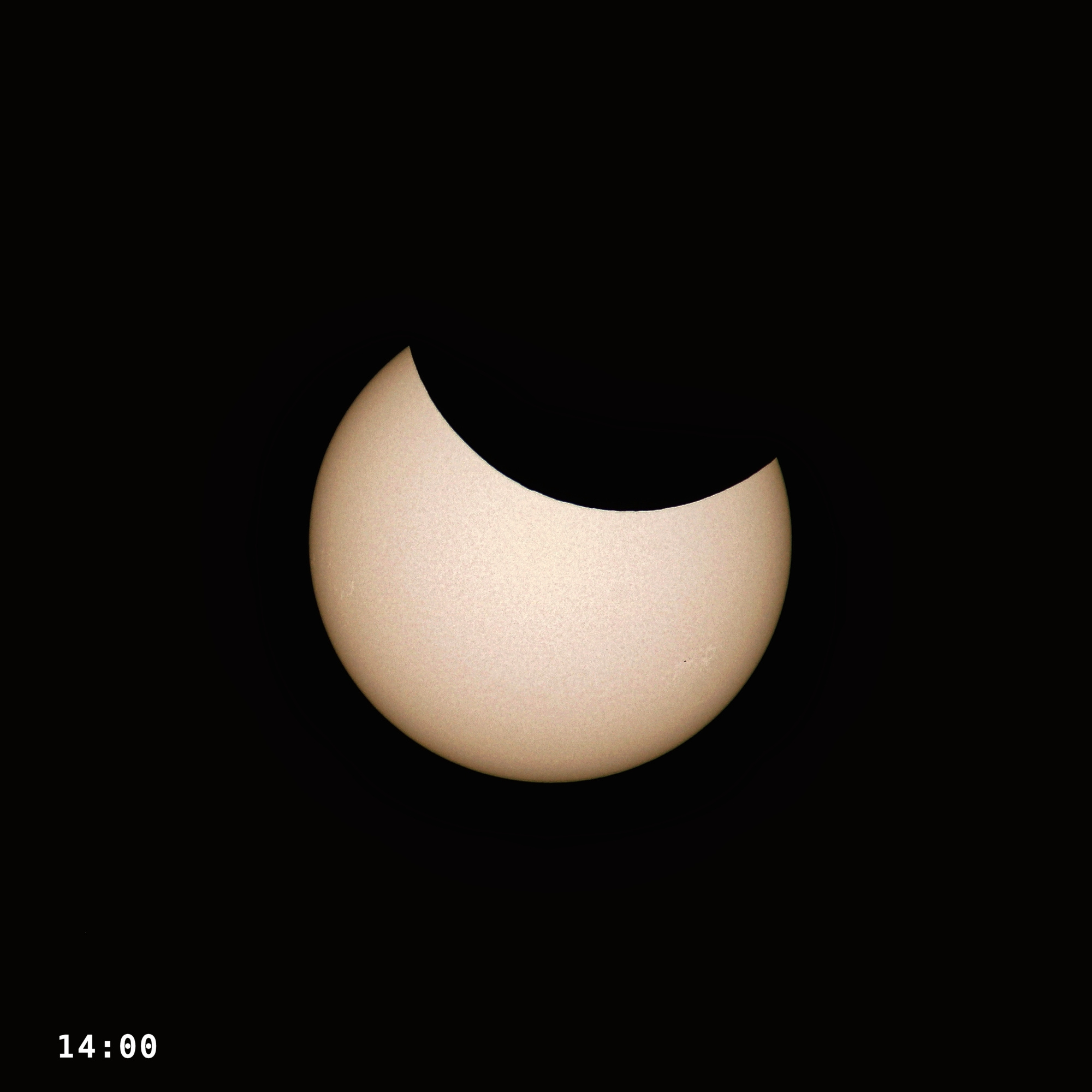
Huittinen, Finland, 11:00 UTC

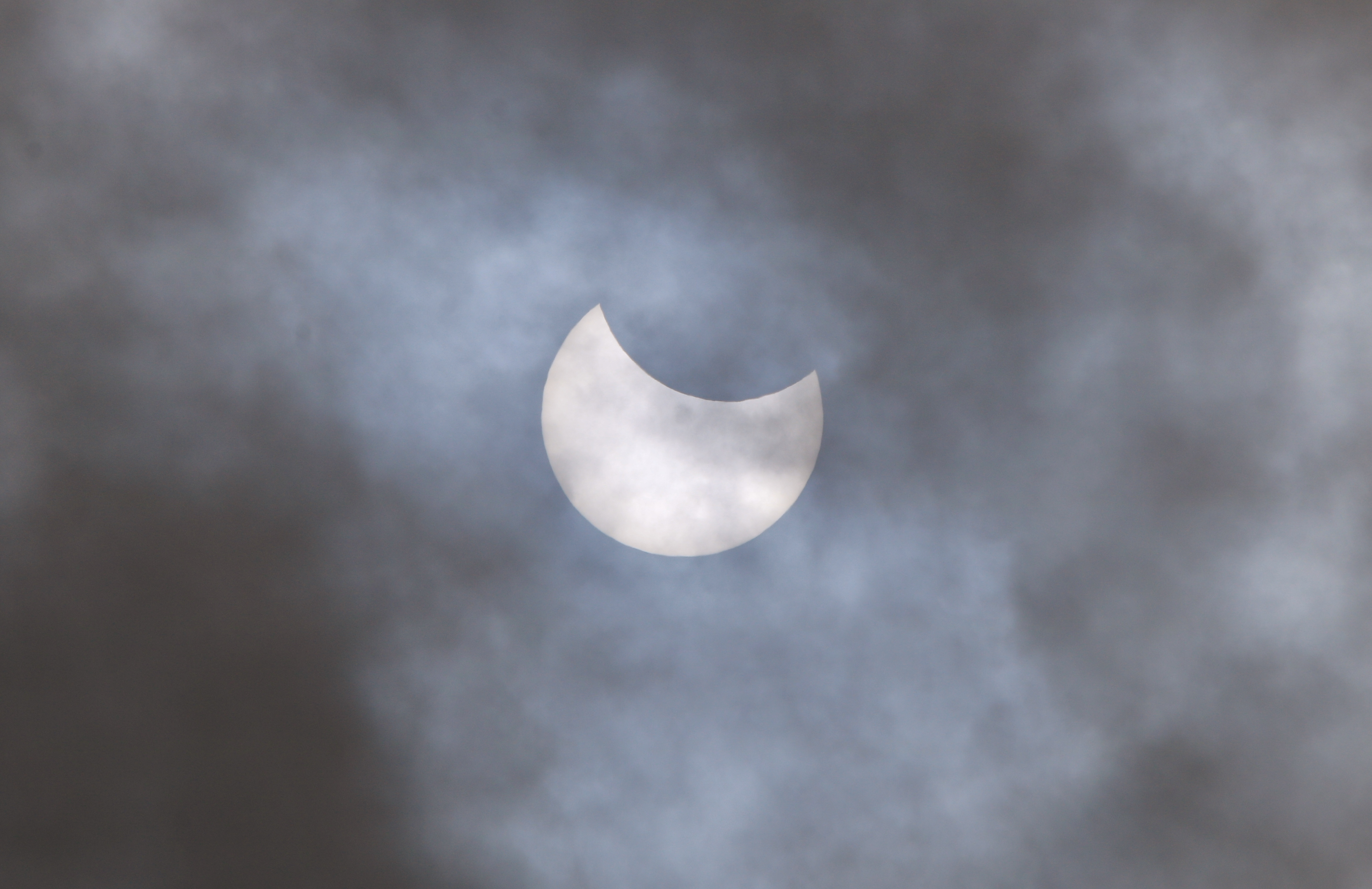
Sumburgh, Shetland, 11:04 UTC

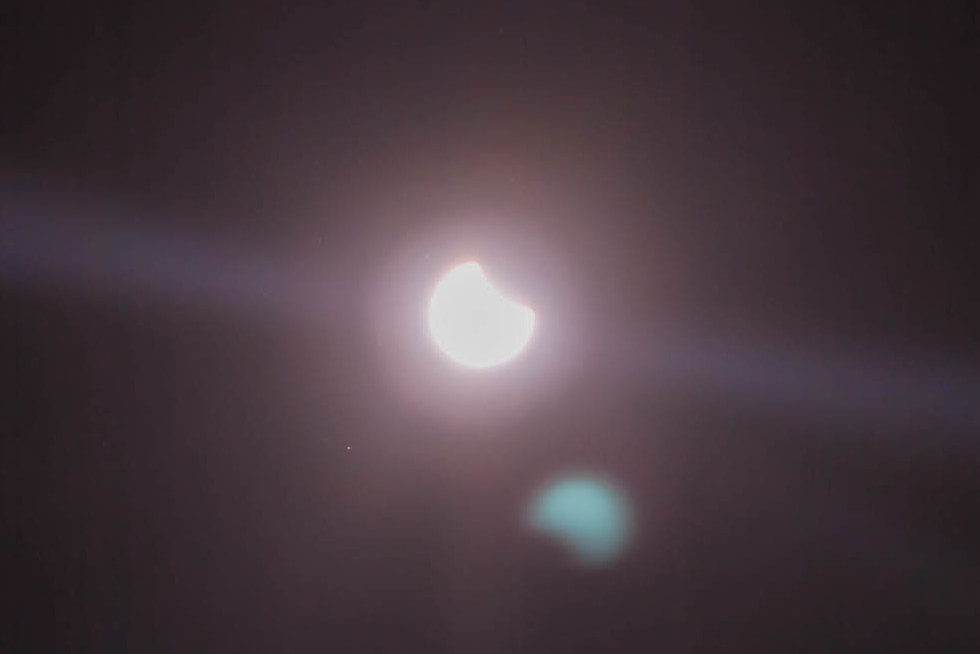
Saint Petersburg, Russia, 11:09 UTC

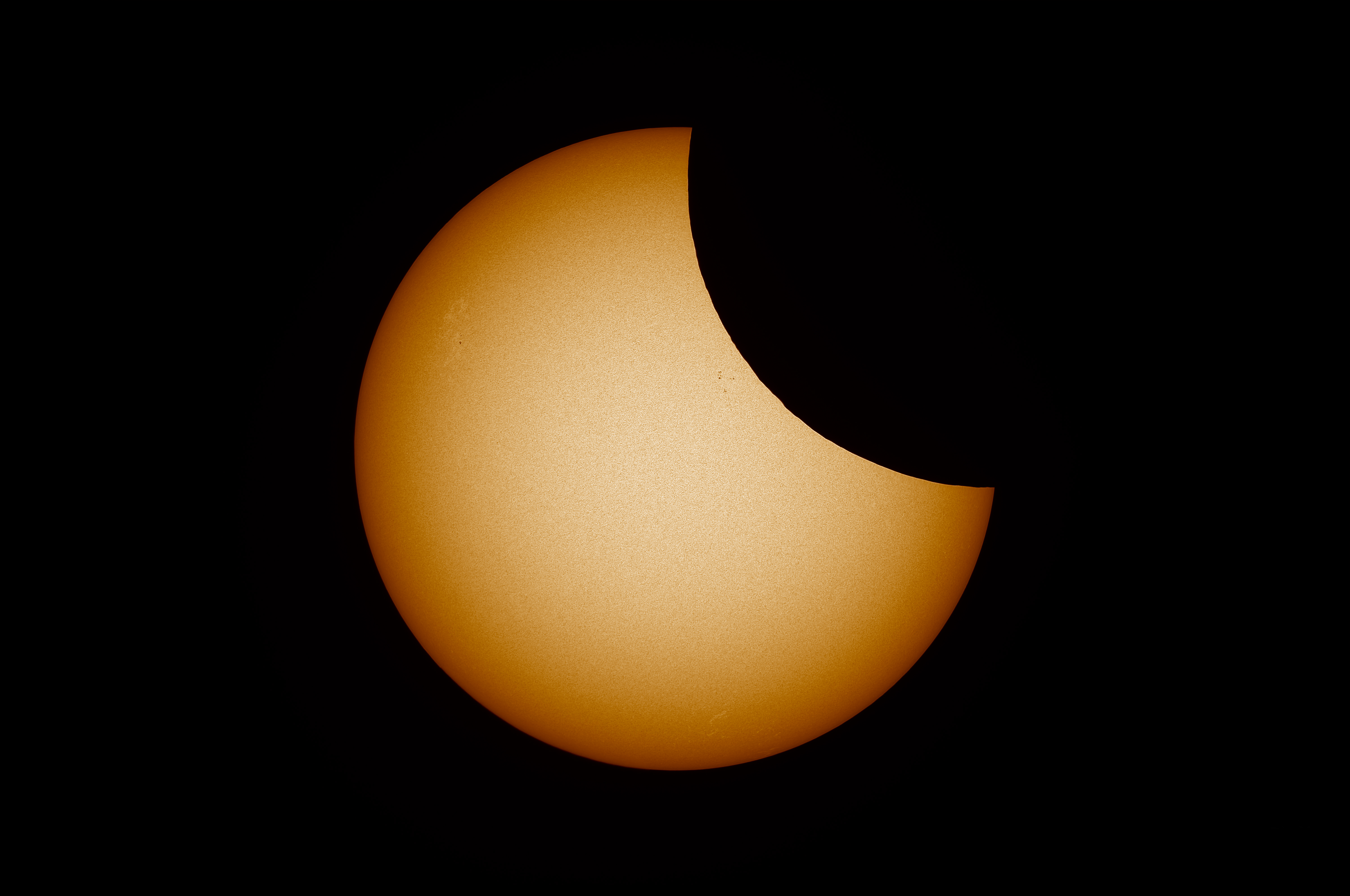
Partial from Tõrva, Estonia

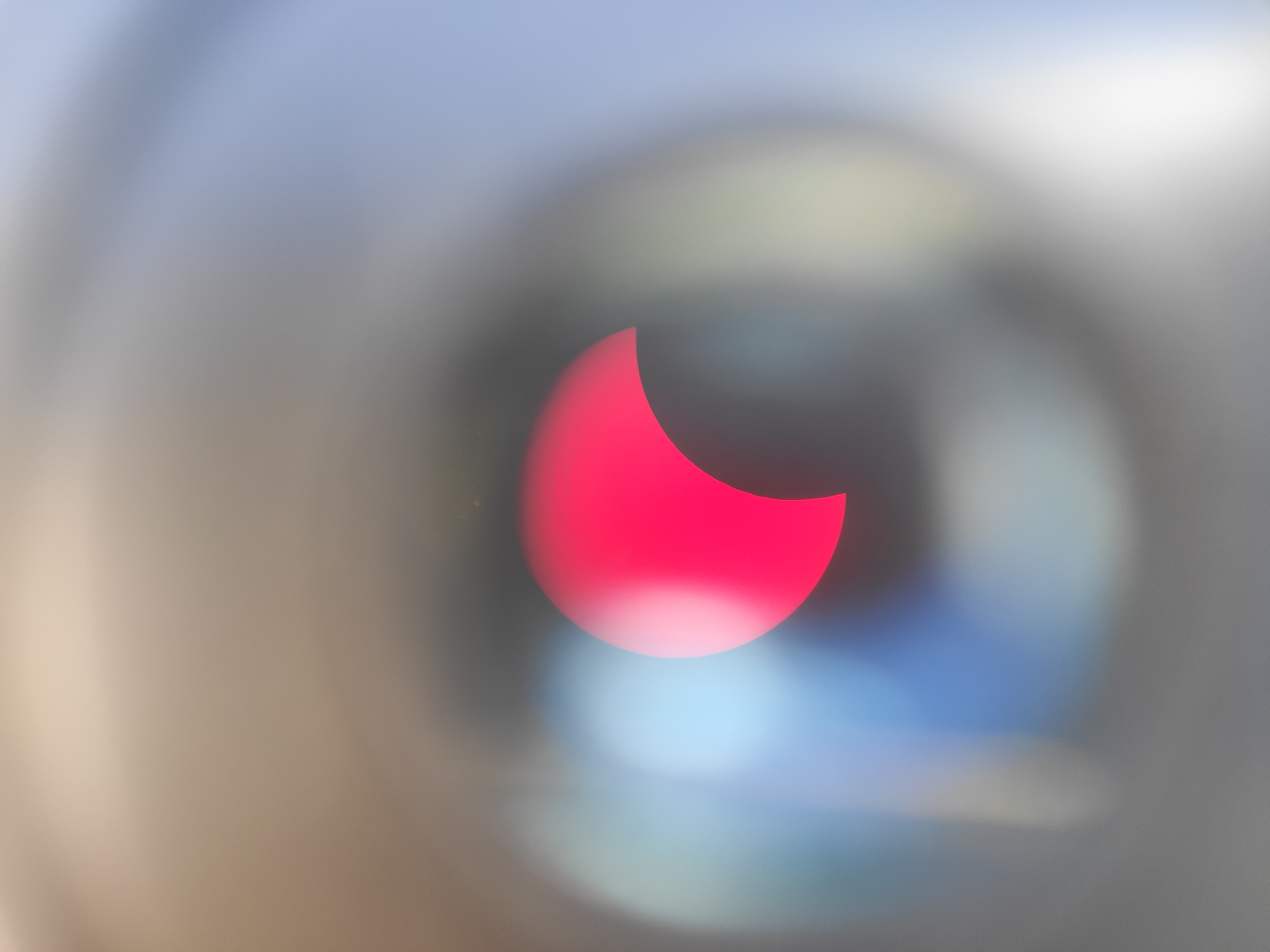
Petrozavodsk, Russia, 11:27 UTC, Coronado telescope

Timelapse-video from Akademgorodok, Novosibirsk, Russia

Timelapse-video from Kharbalakh, Yakutia, Russia

== Eclipse details ==
Shown below are two tables displaying details about this particular solar eclipse. The first table outlines times at which the Moon's penumbra or umbra attains the specific parameter, and the second table describes various other parameters pertaining to this eclipse.

June 10, 2021 Solar Eclipse Times
Event	Time (UTC)
First Penumbral External Contact	2021 June 10 at 08:13:30.6 UTC
First Umbral External Contact	2021 June 10 at 09:50:58.1 UTC
First Central Line	2021 June 10 at 09:56:08.7 UTC
First Umbral Internal Contact	2021 June 10 at 10:01:51.4 UTC
Greatest Eclipse	2021 June 10 at 10:43:06.7 UTC
Greatest Duration	2021 June 10 at 10:43:07.8 UTC
Ecliptic Conjunction	2021 June 10 at 10:53:48.1 UTC
Equatorial Conjunction	2021 June 10 at 11:02:14.3 UTC
Last Umbral Internal Contact	2021 June 10 at 11:24:10.3 UTC
Last Central Line	2021 June 10 at 11:29:51.9 UTC
Last Umbral External Contact	2021 June 10 at 11:35:01.3 UTC
Last Penumbral External Contact	2021 June 10 at 13:12:31.9 UTC

June 10, 2021 Solar Eclipse Parameters
Parameter	Value
Eclipse Magnitude	0.94350
Eclipse Obscuration	0.89019
Gamma	0.91516
Sun Right Ascension	05h15m31.4s
Sun Declination	+23°02'37.1"
Sun Semi-Diameter	15'45.2"
Sun Equatorial Horizontal Parallax	08.7"
Moon Right Ascension	05h14m53.6s
Moon Declination	+23°51'21.6"
Moon Semi-Diameter	14'46.8"
Moon Equatorial Horizontal Parallax	0°54'14.5"
ΔT	70.4 s

== Eclipse season ==
This eclipse is part of an eclipse season, a period, roughly every six months, when eclipses occur. Only two (or occasionally three) eclipse seasons occur each year, and each season lasts about 35 days and repeats just short of six months (173 days) later; thus two full eclipse seasons always occur each year. Either two or three eclipses happen each eclipse season. In the sequence below, each eclipse is separated by a fortnight.

Eclipse season of May–June 2021
May 26 Descending node (full moon)	June 10 Ascending node (new moon)
Total lunar eclipse Lunar Saros 121	Annular solar eclipse Solar Saros 147

== Related eclipses ==
=== Eclipses in 2021 ===
- A total lunar eclipse on May 26.
- An annular solar eclipse on June 10.
- A partial lunar eclipse on November 19.
- A total solar eclipse on December 4.

=== Metonic ===
- Preceded by: Solar eclipse of August 21, 2017
- Followed by: Solar eclipse of March 29, 2025

=== Tzolkinex ===
- Preceded by: Solar eclipse of April 29, 2014
- Followed by: Solar eclipse of July 22, 2028

=== Half-Saros ===
- Preceded by: Lunar eclipse of June 4, 2012
- Followed by: Lunar eclipse of June 15, 2030

=== Tritos ===
- Preceded by: Solar eclipse of July 11, 2010
- Followed by: Solar eclipse of May 9, 2032

=== Solar Saros 147 ===
- Preceded by: Solar eclipse of May 31, 2003
- Followed by: Solar eclipse of June 21, 2039

=== Inex ===
- Preceded by: Solar eclipse of June 30, 1992
- Followed by: Solar eclipse of May 20, 2050

=== Triad ===
- Preceded by: Solar eclipse of August 10, 1934
- Followed by: Solar eclipse of April 11, 2108

=== Solar eclipses of 2018–2021 ===
This eclipse is a member of a semester series. An eclipse in a semester series of solar eclipses repeats approximately every 177 days and 4 hours (a semester) at alternating nodes of the Moon's orbit.

The partial solar eclipses on February 15, 2018 and August 11, 2018 occur in the previous lunar year eclipse set.

Solar eclipse series sets from 2018 to 2021
Ascending node			Descending node		
Saros	Map	Gamma	Saros	Map	Gamma
117 Partial in Melbourne, Australia	July 13, 2018 Partial	−1.35423	122 Partial in Nakhodka, Russia	January 6, 2019 Partial	1.14174
127 Totality in La Serena, Chile	July 2, 2019 Total	−0.64656	132 Annularity in Jaffna, Sri Lanka	December 26, 2019 Annular	0.41351
137 Annularity in Beigang, Yunlin, Taiwan	June 21, 2020 Annular	0.12090	142 Totality in Gorbea, Chile	December 14, 2020 Total	−0.29394
147 Partial in Halifax, Canada	June 10, 2021 Annular	0.91516	152 From HMS Protector off South Georgia	December 4, 2021 Total	−0.95261

=== Saros 147 ===
This eclipse is a part of Saros series 147, repeating every 18 years, 11 days, and containing 80 events. The series started with a partial solar eclipse on October 12, 1624. It contains annular eclipses from May 31, 2003 through July 31, 2706. There are no hybrid or total eclipses in this set. The series ends at member 80 as a partial eclipse on February 24, 3049. Its eclipses are tabulated in three columns; every third eclipse in the same column is one exeligmos apart, so they all cast shadows over approximately the same parts of the Earth.

The longest duration of annularity will be produced by member 38 at 9 minutes, 41 seconds on November 21, 2291. All eclipses in this series occur at the Moon’s ascending node of orbit.

Series members 11–32 occur between 1801 and 2200:
11	12	13
January 30, 1805	February 11, 1823	February 21, 1841
14	15	16
March 4, 1859	March 15, 1877	March 26, 1895
17	18	19
April 6, 1913	April 18, 1931	April 28, 1949
20	21	22
May 9, 1967	May 19, 1985	May 31, 2003
23	24	25
June 10, 2021	June 21, 2039	July 1, 2057
26	27	28
July 13, 2075	July 23, 2093	August 4, 2111
29	30	31
August 15, 2129	August 26, 2147	September 5, 2165
32
September 16, 2183

=== Metonic series ===
The metonic series repeats eclipses every 19 years (6939.69 days), lasting about 5 cycles. Eclipses occur in nearly the same calendar date. In addition, the octon subseries repeats 1/5 of that or every 3.8 years (1387.94 days). All eclipses in this table occur at the Moon's ascending node.

20 eclipse events between June 10, 1964 and August 21, 2036
June 10–11	March 28–29	January 14–16	November 3	August 21–22
117	119	121	123	125
June 10, 1964	March 28, 1968	January 16, 1972	November 3, 1975	August 22, 1979
127	129	131	133	135
June 11, 1983	March 29, 1987	January 15, 1991	November 3, 1994	August 22, 1998
137	139	141	143	145
June 10, 2002	March 29, 2006	January 15, 2010	November 3, 2013	August 21, 2017
147	149	151	153	155
June 10, 2021	March 29, 2025	January 14, 2029	November 3, 2032	August 21, 2036

=== Tritos series ===
This eclipse is a part of a tritos cycle, repeating at alternating nodes every 135 synodic months (≈ 3986.63 days, or 11 years minus 1 month). Their appearance and longitude are irregular due to a lack of synchronization with the anomalistic month (period of perigee), but groupings of 3 tritos cycles (≈ 33 years minus 3 months) come close (≈ 434.044 anomalistic months), so eclipses are similar in these groupings.

Series members between 1801 and 2200
February 21, 1803 (Saros 127)	January 21, 1814 (Saros 128)	December 20, 1824 (Saros 129)	November 20, 1835 (Saros 130)	October 20, 1846 (Saros 131)
September 18, 1857 (Saros 132)	August 18, 1868 (Saros 133)	July 19, 1879 (Saros 134)	June 17, 1890 (Saros 135)	May 18, 1901 (Saros 136)
April 17, 1912 (Saros 137)	March 17, 1923 (Saros 138)	February 14, 1934 (Saros 139)	January 14, 1945 (Saros 140)	December 14, 1955 (Saros 141)
November 12, 1966 (Saros 142)	October 12, 1977 (Saros 143)	September 11, 1988 (Saros 144)	August 11, 1999 (Saros 145)	July 11, 2010 (Saros 146)
June 10, 2021 (Saros 147)	May 9, 2032 (Saros 148)	April 9, 2043 (Saros 149)	March 9, 2054 (Saros 150)	February 5, 2065 (Saros 151)
January 6, 2076 (Saros 152)	December 6, 2086 (Saros 153)	November 4, 2097 (Saros 154)	October 5, 2108 (Saros 155)	September 5, 2119 (Saros 156)
August 4, 2130 (Saros 157)	July 3, 2141 (Saros 158)	June 3, 2152 (Saros 159)		April 1, 2174 (Saros 161)

=== Inex series ===
This eclipse is a part of the long period inex cycle, repeating at alternating nodes, every 358 synodic months (≈ 10,571.95 days, or 29 years minus 20 days). Their appearance and longitude are irregular due to a lack of synchronization with the anomalistic month (period of perigee). However, groupings of 3 inex cycles (≈ 87 years minus 2 months) comes close (≈ 1,151.02 anomalistic months), so eclipses are similar in these groupings.

Series members between 1801 and 2200
October 29, 1818 (Saros 140)	October 9, 1847 (Saros 141)	September 17, 1876 (Saros 142)
August 30, 1905 (Saros 143)	August 10, 1934 (Saros 144)	July 20, 1963 (Saros 145)
June 30, 1992 (Saros 146)	June 10, 2021 (Saros 147)	May 20, 2050 (Saros 148)
May 1, 2079 (Saros 149)	April 11, 2108 (Saros 150)	March 21, 2137 (Saros 151)
March 2, 2166 (Saros 152)	February 10, 2195 (Saros 153)	
