= Solar eclipse of April 6, 1875 =

Total eclipse

- Total eclipse
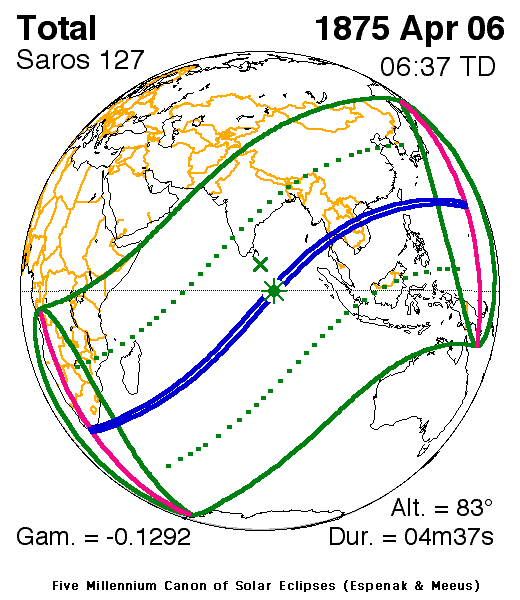
- Map
- Gamma: −0.1292
- Magnitude: 1.0547

Maximum eclipse
- Duration: 277 s (4 min 37 s)
- Coordinates: 0.2°S 84.8°E
- Max. width of band: 182 km (113 mi)

Times (UTC)
- Greatest eclipse: 6:37:26

References
- Saros: 127 (50 of 82)
- Catalog # (SE5000): 9222

A total solar eclipse occurred at the Moon's ascending node of orbit on Tuesday, April 6, 1875, with a magnitude of 1.0547. A solar eclipse occurs when the Moon passes between Earth and the Sun, thereby totally or partly obscuring the image of the Sun for a viewer on Earth. A total solar eclipse occurs when the Moon's apparent diameter is larger than the Sun's, blocking all direct sunlight, turning day into darkness. Totality occurs in a narrow path across Earth's surface, with the partial solar eclipse visible over a surrounding region thousands of kilometres wide. Occurring about 1.2 days before perigee (on April 7, 1875, at 10:50 UTC), the Moon's apparent diameter was larger.

The path of totality was visible from parts of the modern-day Andaman and Nicobar Islands, Myanmar, Thailand, northwestern Cambodia, Laos, Vietnam, and southern Hainan. A partial solar eclipse was also visible for parts of Southern Africa, South Asia, Southeast Asia, and East Asia.

== Observations ==
Astronomers J. N. Lockyer and Arthur Schuster traveled to observe the eclipse and measure spectral lines to determine the elemental contents of the solar corona.

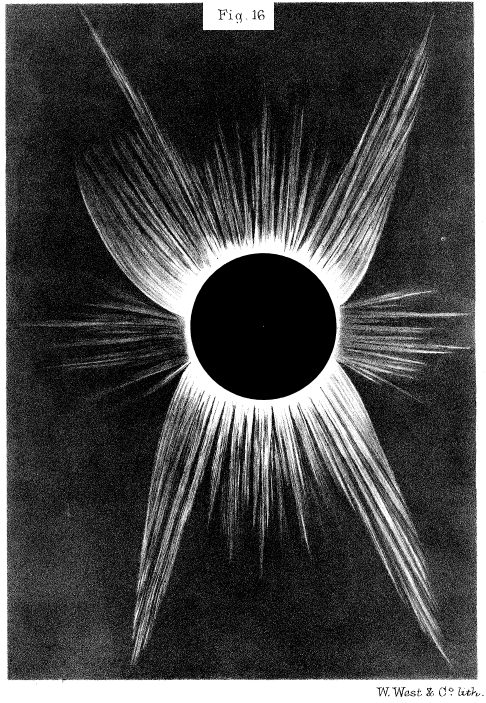

== Eclipse details ==
Shown below are two tables displaying details about this particular solar eclipse. The first table outlines times at which the Moon's penumbra or umbra attains the specific parameter, and the second table describes various other parameters pertaining to this eclipse.

April 6, 1875 Solar Eclipse Times
Event	Time (UTC)
First Penumbral External Contact	1875 April 6 at 03:58:24.3 UTC
First Umbral External Contact	1875 April 6 at 04:53:30.8 UTC
First Central Line	1875 April 6 at 04:54:30.3 UTC
First Umbral Internal Contact	1875 April 6 at 04:55:29.9 UTC
First Penumbral Internal Contact	1875 April 6 at 05:51:22.0 UTC
Equatorial Conjunction	1875 April 6 at 06:30:12.4 UTC
Ecliptic Conjunction	1875 April 6 at 06:36:06.1 UTC
Greatest Eclipse	1875 April 6 at 06:37:26.0 UTC
Greatest Duration	1875 April 6 at 06:41:48.9 UTC
Last Penumbral Internal Contact	1875 April 6 at 07:23:40.2 UTC
Last Umbral Internal Contact	1875 April 6 at 08:19:24.7 UTC
Last Central Line	1875 April 6 at 08:20:25.7 UTC
Last Umbral External Contact	1875 April 6 at 08:21:26.7 UTC
Last Penumbral External Contact	1875 April 6 at 09:16:27.4 UTC

April 6, 1875 Solar Eclipse Parameters
Parameter	Value
Eclipse Magnitude	1.05467
Eclipse Obscuration	1.11232
Gamma	−0.12915
Sun Right Ascension	00h59m10.4s
Sun Declination	+06°19'21.5"
Sun Semi-Diameter	15'58.4"
Sun Equatorial Horizontal Parallax	08.8"
Moon Right Ascension	00h59m25.4s
Moon Declination	+06°12'27.7"
Moon Semi-Diameter	16'33.9"
Moon Equatorial Horizontal Parallax	1°00'47.6"
ΔT	-3.3 s

== Eclipse season ==
This eclipse is part of an eclipse season, a period, roughly every six months, when eclipses occur. Only two (or occasionally three) eclipse seasons occur each year, and each season lasts about 35 days and repeats just short of six months (173 days) later; thus two full eclipse seasons always occur each year. Either two or three eclipses happen each eclipse season. In the sequence below, each eclipse is separated by a fortnight.

Eclipse season of April 1875
April 6, 1875 Ascending node (new moon)	April 20 Descending node (full moon)
Total solar eclipse Solar Saros 127	Penumbral lunar eclipse Lunar Saros 139

== Related eclipses ==
=== Eclipses in 1875 ===
- A total solar eclipse on April 6.
- A penumbral lunar eclipse on April 20.
- A penumbral lunar eclipse on September 15.
- An annular solar eclipse on September 29.
- A penumbral lunar eclipse on October 14.

=== Metonic ===
- Preceded by: Solar eclipse of June 18, 1871
- Followed by: Solar eclipse of January 22, 1879

=== Tzolkinex ===
- Preceded by: Solar eclipse of February 23, 1868
- Followed by: Solar eclipse of May 17, 1882

=== Half-Saros ===
- Preceded by: Lunar eclipse of March 31, 1866
- Followed by: Lunar eclipse of April 10, 1884

=== Tritos ===
- Preceded by: Solar eclipse of May 6, 1864
- Followed by: Solar eclipse of March 5, 1886

=== Solar Saros 127 ===
- Preceded by: Solar eclipse of March 25, 1857
- Followed by: Solar eclipse of April 16, 1893

=== Inex ===
- Preceded by: Solar eclipse of April 25, 1846
- Followed by: Solar eclipse of March 17, 1904

=== Triad ===
- Preceded by: Solar eclipse of June 4, 1788
- Followed by: Solar eclipse of February 5, 1962

=== Solar eclipses of 1874–1877 ===
This eclipse is a member of a semester series. An eclipse in a semester series of solar eclipses repeats approximately every 177 days and 4 hours (a semester) at alternating nodes of the Moon's orbit.

The partial solar eclipse on August 9, 1877 occurs in the next lunar year eclipse set.

Solar eclipse series sets from 1874 to 1877
Ascending node			Descending node		
Saros	Map	Gamma	Saros	Map	Gamma
117	April 16, 1874 Total	−0.8364	122	October 10, 1874 Annular	0.9889
127	April 6, 1875 Total	−0.1292	132	September 29, 1875 Annular	0.2427
137	March 25, 1876 Annular	0.6142	142	September 17, 1876 Total	−0.5054
147	March 15, 1877 Partial	1.3924	152	September 7, 1877 Partial	−1.1985

=== Saros 127 ===
This eclipse is a part of Saros series 127, repeating every 18 years, 11 days, and containing 82 events. The series started with a partial solar eclipse on October 10, 991 AD. It contains total eclipses from May 14, 1352 through August 15, 2091. There are no annular or hybrid eclipses in this set. The series ends at member 82 as a partial eclipse on March 21, 2452. Its eclipses are tabulated in three columns; every third eclipse in the same column is one exeligmos apart, so they all cast shadows over approximately the same parts of the Earth.

The longest duration of totality was produced by member 31 at 5 minutes, 40 seconds on August 30, 1532. All eclipses in this series occur at the Moon’s ascending node of orbit.

Series members 46–68 occur between 1801 and 2200:
46	47	48
February 21, 1803	March 4, 1821	March 15, 1839
49	50	51
March 25, 1857	April 6, 1875	April 16, 1893
52	53	54
April 28, 1911	May 9, 1929	May 20, 1947
55	56	57
May 30, 1965	June 11, 1983	June 21, 2001
58	59	60
July 2, 2019	July 13, 2037	July 24, 2055
61	62	63
August 3, 2073	August 15, 2091	August 26, 2109
64	65	66
September 6, 2127	September 16, 2145	September 28, 2163
67	68	
October 8, 2181	October 19, 2199	

=== Metonic series ===
The metonic series repeats eclipses every 19 years (6939.69 days), lasting about 5 cycles. Eclipses occur in nearly the same calendar date. In addition, the octon subseries repeats 1/5 of that or every 3.8 years (1387.94 days). All eclipses in this table occur at the Moon's ascending node.

25 eclipse events between April 5, 1837 and June 17, 1928
April 5–6	January 22–23	November 10–11	August 28–30	June 17–18
107	109	111	113	115
April 5, 1837	January 22, 1841	November 10, 1844	August 28, 1848	June 17, 1852
117	119	121	123	125
April 5, 1856	January 23, 1860	November 11, 1863	August 29, 1867	June 18, 1871
127	129	131	133	135
April 6, 1875	January 22, 1879	November 10, 1882	August 29, 1886	June 17, 1890
137	139	141	143	145
April 6, 1894	January 22, 1898	November 11, 1901	August 30, 1905	June 17, 1909
147	149	151	153	155
April 6, 1913	January 23, 1917	November 10, 1920	August 30, 1924	June 17, 1928

=== Tritos series ===
This eclipse is a part of a tritos cycle, repeating at alternating nodes every 135 synodic months (≈ 3986.63 days, or 11 years minus 1 month). Their appearance and longitude are irregular due to a lack of synchronization with the anomalistic month (period of perigee), but groupings of 3 tritos cycles (≈ 33 years minus 3 months) come close (≈ 434.044 anomalistic months), so eclipses are similar in these groupings.

Series members between 1801 and 2200
October 9, 1809 (Saros 121)	September 7, 1820 (Saros 122)	August 7, 1831 (Saros 123)	July 8, 1842 (Saros 124)	June 6, 1853 (Saros 125)
May 6, 1864 (Saros 126)	April 6, 1875 (Saros 127)	March 5, 1886 (Saros 128)	February 1, 1897 (Saros 129)	January 3, 1908 (Saros 130)
December 3, 1918 (Saros 131)	November 1, 1929 (Saros 132)	October 1, 1940 (Saros 133)	September 1, 1951 (Saros 134)	July 31, 1962 (Saros 135)
June 30, 1973 (Saros 136)	May 30, 1984 (Saros 137)	April 29, 1995 (Saros 138)	March 29, 2006 (Saros 139)	February 26, 2017 (Saros 140)
January 26, 2028 (Saros 141)	December 26, 2038 (Saros 142)	November 25, 2049 (Saros 143)	October 24, 2060 (Saros 144)	September 23, 2071 (Saros 145)
August 24, 2082 (Saros 146)	July 23, 2093 (Saros 147)	June 22, 2104 (Saros 148)	May 24, 2115 (Saros 149)	April 22, 2126 (Saros 150)
March 21, 2137 (Saros 151)	February 19, 2148 (Saros 152)	January 19, 2159 (Saros 153)	December 18, 2169 (Saros 154)	November 17, 2180 (Saros 155)
October 18, 2191 (Saros 156)

=== Inex series ===
This eclipse is a part of the long period inex cycle, repeating at alternating nodes, every 358 synodic months (≈ 10,571.95 days, or 29 years minus 20 days). Their appearance and longitude are irregular due to a lack of synchronization with the anomalistic month (period of perigee). However, groupings of 3 inex cycles (≈ 87 years minus 2 months) comes close (≈ 1,151.02 anomalistic months), so eclipses are similar in these groupings.

Series members between 1801 and 2200
May 16, 1817 (Saros 125)	April 25, 1846 (Saros 126)	April 6, 1875 (Saros 127)
March 17, 1904 (Saros 128)	February 24, 1933 (Saros 129)	February 5, 1962 (Saros 130)
January 15, 1991 (Saros 131)	December 26, 2019 (Saros 132)	December 5, 2048 (Saros 133)
November 15, 2077 (Saros 134)	October 26, 2106 (Saros 135)	October 7, 2135 (Saros 136)
September 16, 2164 (Saros 137)	August 26, 2193 (Saros 138)	
