= Solar eclipse of February 25, 1952 =

Total eclipse

- Total eclipse
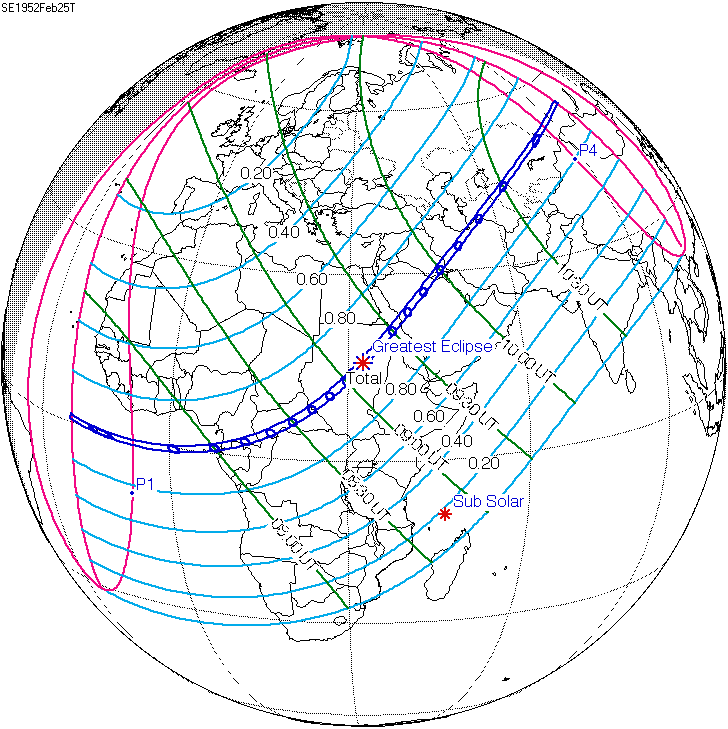
- Map
- Gamma: 0.4697
- Magnitude: 1.0366

Maximum eclipse
- Duration: 189 s (3 min 9 s)
- Coordinates: 15.6°N 32.7°E
- Max. width of band: 138 km (86 mi)

Times (UTC)
- Greatest eclipse: 9:11:35

References
- Saros: 139 (26 of 71)
- Catalog # (SE5000): 9402

A total solar eclipse occurred at the Moon's ascending node of orbit on Monday, February 25, 1952, with a magnitude of 1.0366. A solar eclipse occurs when the Moon passes between Earth and the Sun, thereby totally or partly obscuring the image of the Sun for a viewer on Earth. A total solar eclipse occurs when the Moon's apparent diameter is larger than the Sun's, blocking all direct sunlight, turning day into darkness. Totality occurs in a narrow path across Earth's surface, with the partial solar eclipse visible over a surrounding region thousands of kilometres wide. Occurring 1.4 days after perigee (on February 23, 1952, at 22:30 UTC), the Moon's apparent diameter was larger.

The path of totality crossed French Equatorial Africa, Belgian Congo, Anglo-Egyptian Sudan, Arabia, Pahlavi Iran and the Soviet Union. A partial eclipse was visible for parts of Africa, Europe, West Asia, Central Asia, and South Asia.

== Observations ==
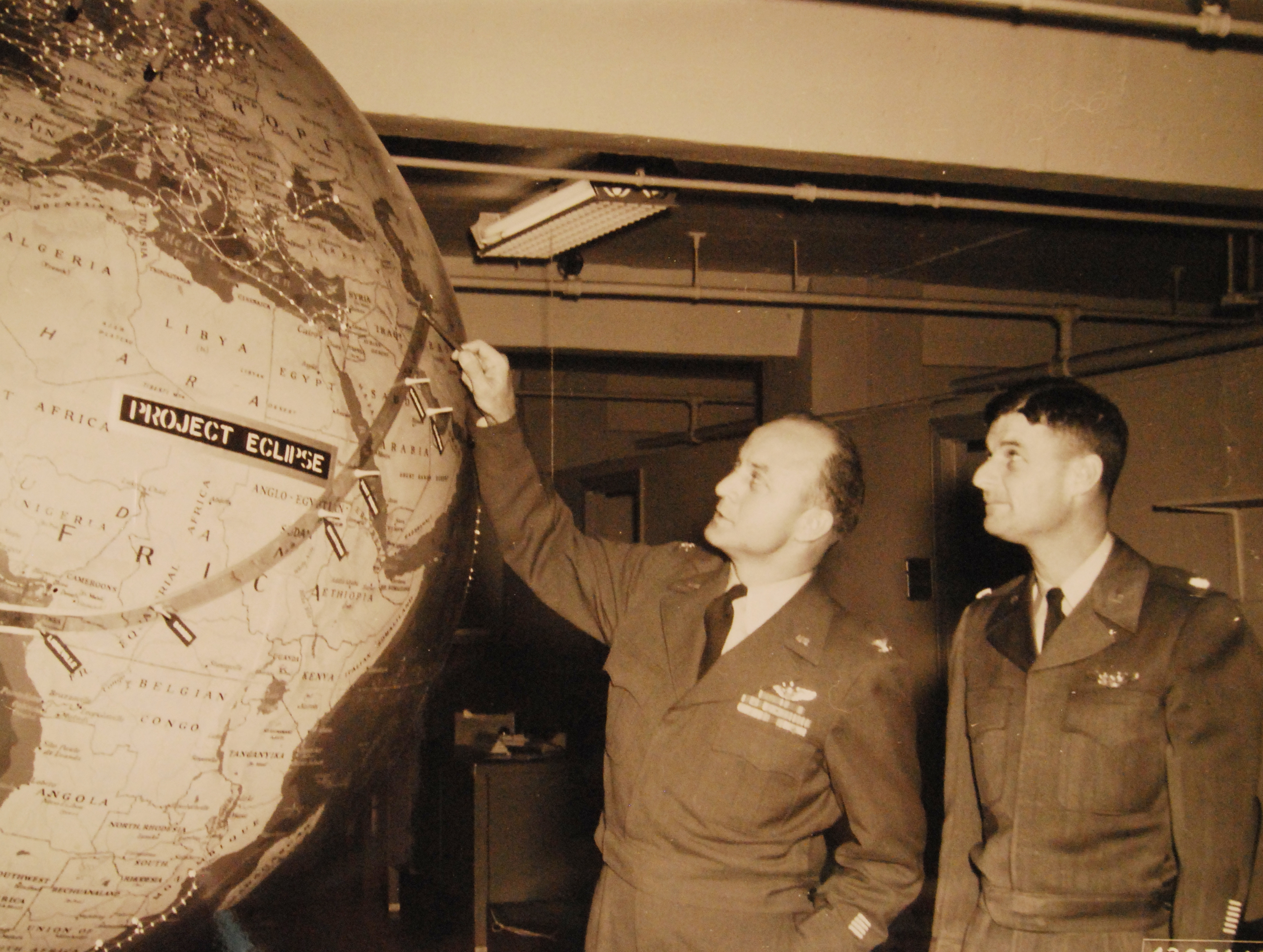
USAF officers tracing the path of the eclipse on a globe

Astronomers from various countries started traveling to Khartoum, capital of Anglo-Egyptian Sudan from January 1952. The team of the United States Naval Research Laboratory made studies in radio astronomy, spectrum, luminosity of corona and spectral observations. Teams of the High Altitude Observatory of Harvard University and University of Colorado analyzed the spectrum of the Balmer series in the hydrogen spectral series. In addition, French astronomer Bernard Ferdinand Lyot, who invented the coronagraph that allows observing the solar corona at any time, not limited to total solar eclipses, died of a heart attack in Cairo, Egypt on his way back from observing the total solar eclipse in Sudan.

== Eclipse details ==
Shown below are two tables displaying details about this particular solar eclipse. The first table outlines times at which the Moon's penumbra or umbra attains the specific parameter, and the second table describes various other parameters pertaining to this eclipse.

February 25, 1952 Solar Eclipse Times
Event	Time (UTC)
First Penumbral External Contact	1952 February 25 at 06:38:16.5 UTC
First Umbral External Contact	1952 February 25 at 07:38:39.4 UTC
First Central Line	1952 February 25 at 07:39:19.4 UTC
First Umbral Internal Contact	1952 February 25 at 07:39:59.5 UTC
Greatest Duration	1952 February 25 at 09:07:12.9 UTC
Greatest Eclipse	1952 February 25 at 09:11:34.8 UTC
Ecliptic Conjunction	1952 February 25 at 09:16:27.1 UTC
Equatorial Conjunction	1952 February 25 at 09:36:51.1 UTC
Last Umbral Internal Contact	1952 February 25 at 10:42:56.4 UTC
Last Central Line	1952 February 25 at 10:43:34.9 UTC
Last Umbral External Contact	1952 February 25 at 10:44:13.4 UTC
Last Penumbral External Contact	1952 February 25 at 11:44:46.4 UTC

February 25, 1952 Solar Eclipse Parameters
Parameter	Value
Eclipse Magnitude	1.03660
Eclipse Obscuration	1.07454
Gamma	0.46973
Sun Right Ascension	22h30m04.0s
Sun Declination	-09°25'03.8"
Sun Semi-Diameter	16'09.4"
Sun Equatorial Horizontal Parallax	08.9"
Moon Right Ascension	22h29m11.4s
Moon Declination	-08°59'49.8"
Moon Semi-Diameter	16'30.0"
Moon Equatorial Horizontal Parallax	1°00'33.5"
ΔT	30.0 s

== Eclipse season ==
This eclipse is part of an eclipse season, a period, roughly every six months, when eclipses occur. Only two (or occasionally three) eclipse seasons occur each year, and each season lasts about 35 days and repeats just short of six months (173 days) later; thus two full eclipse seasons always occur each year. Either two or three eclipses happen each eclipse season. In the sequence below, each eclipse is separated by a fortnight.

Eclipse season of February 1952
February 11 Descending node (full moon)	February 25 Ascending node (new moon)
Partial lunar eclipse Lunar Saros 113	Total solar eclipse Solar Saros 139

== Related eclipses ==
=== Eclipses in 1952 ===
- A partial lunar eclipse on February 11.
- A total solar eclipse on February 25.
- A partial lunar eclipse on August 5.
- An annular solar eclipse on August 20.

=== Metonic ===
- Preceded by: Solar eclipse of May 9, 1948
- Followed by: Solar eclipse of December 14, 1955

=== Tzolkinex ===
- Preceded by: Solar eclipse of January 14, 1945
- Followed by: Solar eclipse of April 8, 1959

=== Half-Saros ===
- Preceded by: Lunar eclipse of February 20, 1943
- Followed by: Lunar eclipse of March 2, 1961

=== Tritos ===
- Preceded by: Solar eclipse of March 27, 1941
- Followed by: Solar eclipse of January 25, 1963

=== Solar Saros 139 ===
- Preceded by: Solar eclipse of February 14, 1934
- Followed by: Solar eclipse of March 7, 1970

=== Inex ===
- Preceded by: Solar eclipse of March 17, 1923
- Followed by: Solar eclipse of February 4, 1981

=== Triad ===
- Preceded by: Solar eclipse of April 25, 1865
- Followed by: Solar eclipse of December 26, 2038

=== Solar eclipses of 1950–1953 ===
This eclipse is a member of a semester series. An eclipse in a semester series of solar eclipses repeats approximately every 177 days and 4 hours (a semester) at alternating nodes of the Moon's orbit.

The partial solar eclipse on July 11, 1953 occurs in the next lunar year eclipse set.

Solar eclipse series sets from 1950 to 1953
Ascending node			Descending node		
Saros	Map	Gamma	Saros	Map	Gamma
119	March 18, 1950 Annular (non-central)	0.9988	124	September 12, 1950 Total	0.8903
129	March 7, 1951 Annular	−0.242	134	September 1, 1951 Annular	0.1557
139	February 25, 1952 Total	0.4697	144	August 20, 1952 Annular	−0.6102
149	February 14, 1953 Partial	1.1331	154	August 9, 1953 Partial	−1.344

=== Saros 139 ===
This eclipse is a part of Saros series 139, repeating every 18 years, 11 days, and containing 71 events. The series started with a partial solar eclipse on May 17, 1501. It contains hybrid eclipses from August 11, 1627 through December 9, 1825 and total eclipses from December 21, 1843 through March 26, 2601. There are no annular eclipses in this set. The series ends at member 71 as a partial eclipse on July 3, 2763. Its eclipses are tabulated in three columns; every third eclipse in the same column is one exeligmos apart, so they all cast shadows over approximately the same parts of the Earth.

The longest duration of totality will be produced by member 61 at 7 minutes, 29.22 seconds on July 16, 2186. This date is the longest solar eclipse computed between 4000 BC and AD 6000. All eclipses in this series occur at the Moon’s ascending node of orbit.

Series members 18–39 occur between 1801 and 2200:
18	19	20
November 29, 1807	December 9, 1825	December 21, 1843
21	22	23
December 31, 1861	January 11, 1880	January 22, 1898
24	25	26
February 3, 1916	February 14, 1934	February 25, 1952
27	28	29
March 7, 1970	March 18, 1988	March 29, 2006
30	31	32
April 8, 2024	April 20, 2042	April 30, 2060
33	34	35
May 11, 2078	May 22, 2096	June 3, 2114
36	37	38
June 13, 2132	June 25, 2150	July 5, 2168
39
July 16, 2186

=== Metonic series ===
The metonic series repeats eclipses every 19 years (6939.69 days), lasting about 5 cycles. Eclipses occur in nearly the same calendar date. In addition, the octon subseries repeats 1/5 of that or every 3.8 years (1387.94 days). All eclipses in this table occur at the Moon's ascending node.

22 eclipse events between December 13, 1898 and July 20, 1982
December 13–14	October 1–2	July 20–21	May 9	February 24–25
111	113	115	117	119
December 13, 1898		July 21, 1906	May 9, 1910	February 25, 1914
121	123	125	127	129
December 14, 1917	October 1, 1921	July 20, 1925	May 9, 1929	February 24, 1933
131	133	135	137	139
December 13, 1936	October 1, 1940	July 20, 1944	May 9, 1948	February 25, 1952
141	143	145	147	149
December 14, 1955	October 2, 1959	July 20, 1963	May 9, 1967	February 25, 1971
151	153	155		
December 13, 1974	October 2, 1978	July 20, 1982		

=== Tritos series ===
This eclipse is a part of a tritos cycle, repeating at alternating nodes every 135 synodic months (≈ 3986.63 days, or 11 years minus 1 month). Their appearance and longitude are irregular due to a lack of synchronization with the anomalistic month (period of perigee), but groupings of 3 tritos cycles (≈ 33 years minus 3 months) come close (≈ 434.044 anomalistic months), so eclipses are similar in these groupings.

Series members between 1801 and 2200
April 4, 1810 (Saros 126)	March 4, 1821 (Saros 127)	February 1, 1832 (Saros 128)	December 31, 1842 (Saros 129)	November 30, 1853 (Saros 130)
October 30, 1864 (Saros 131)	September 29, 1875 (Saros 132)	August 29, 1886 (Saros 133)	July 29, 1897 (Saros 134)	June 28, 1908 (Saros 135)
May 29, 1919 (Saros 136)	April 28, 1930 (Saros 137)	March 27, 1941 (Saros 138)	February 25, 1952 (Saros 139)	January 25, 1963 (Saros 140)
December 24, 1973 (Saros 141)	November 22, 1984 (Saros 142)	October 24, 1995 (Saros 143)	September 22, 2006 (Saros 144)	August 21, 2017 (Saros 145)
July 22, 2028 (Saros 146)	June 21, 2039 (Saros 147)	May 20, 2050 (Saros 148)	April 20, 2061 (Saros 149)	March 19, 2072 (Saros 150)
February 16, 2083 (Saros 151)	January 16, 2094 (Saros 152)	December 17, 2104 (Saros 153)	November 16, 2115 (Saros 154)	October 16, 2126 (Saros 155)
September 15, 2137 (Saros 156)	August 14, 2148 (Saros 157)	July 15, 2159 (Saros 158)	June 14, 2170 (Saros 159)	May 13, 2181 (Saros 160)
April 12, 2192 (Saros 161)

=== Inex series ===
This eclipse is a part of the long period inex cycle, repeating at alternating nodes, every 358 synodic months (≈ 10,571.95 days, or 29 years minus 20 days). Their appearance and longitude are irregular due to a lack of synchronization with the anomalistic month (period of perigee). However, groupings of 3 inex cycles (≈ 87 years minus 2 months) comes close (≈ 1,151.02 anomalistic months), so eclipses are similar in these groupings.

Series members between 1801 and 2200
June 6, 1807 (Saros 134)	May 15, 1836 (Saros 135)	April 25, 1865 (Saros 136)
April 6, 1894 (Saros 137)	March 17, 1923 (Saros 138)	February 25, 1952 (Saros 139)
February 4, 1981 (Saros 140)	January 15, 2010 (Saros 141)	December 26, 2038 (Saros 142)
December 6, 2067 (Saros 143)	November 15, 2096 (Saros 144)	October 26, 2125 (Saros 145)
October 7, 2154 (Saros 146)	September 16, 2183 (Saros 147)	
