= August 1969 lunar eclipse =

Penumbral lunar eclipse August 27, 1969

- Penumbral eclipse
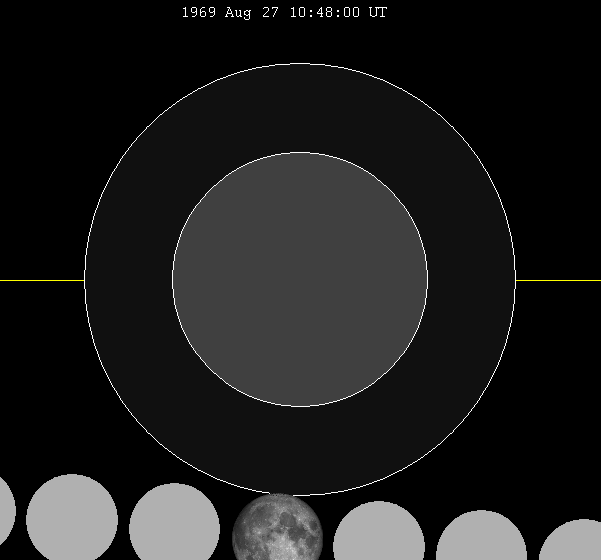
- The Moon's hourly motion shown right to left
- Date: August 27, 1969
- Gamma: −1.5407
- Magnitude: −0.9514
- Saros cycle: 108 (72 of 72)
- Penumbral: 31 minutes, 16 seconds
Contacts (UTC)
- P1: 10:31:50
- Greatest: 10:47:35
- P4: 11:03:06

A penumbral lunar eclipse occurred at the Moon’s ascending node of orbit on Wednesday, August 27, 1969, with an umbral magnitude of −0.9514. A lunar eclipse occurs when the Moon moves into the Earth's shadow, causing the Moon to be darkened. A penumbral lunar eclipse occurs when part or all of the Moon's near side passes into the Earth's penumbra. Unlike a solar eclipse, which can only be viewed from a relatively small area of the world, a lunar eclipse may be viewed from anywhere on the night side of Earth. Occurring about 2.25 days after perigee (on August 25, 1969, at 16:30 UTC), the Moon's apparent diameter was larger.

This was the last lunar eclipse of Lunar Saros 108.

== Visibility ==
The eclipse was completely "visible" over east and northeast Asia, Australia, western and central North America, western South America, and Antarctica.

"Visible" is quoted here as a magnitude of 1.3% in the penumbra is not discernible at all with the human eye. It means the parts of the world where the full Moon was above the horizon, just looking like an uneclipsed Moon.

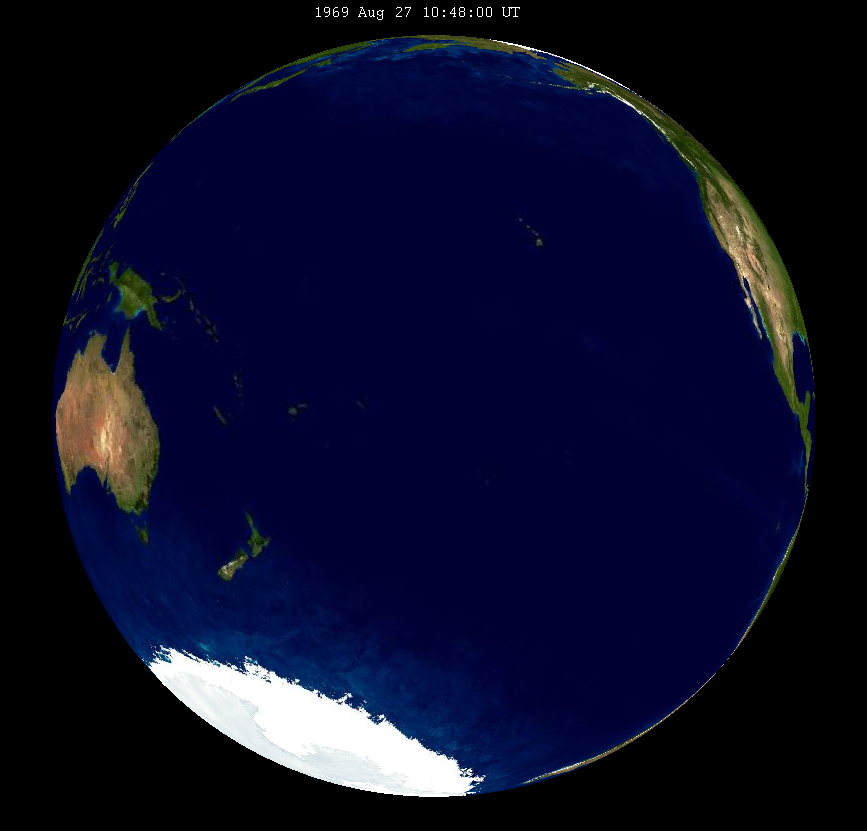
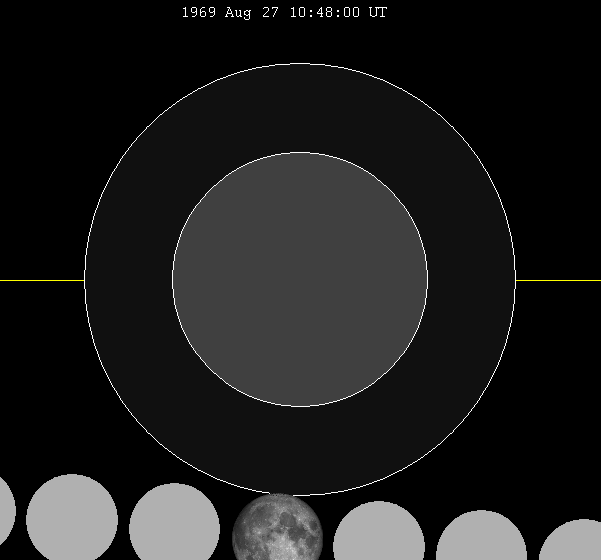

== Eclipse details ==
Shown below is a table displaying details about this particular lunar eclipse. It describes various parameters pertaining to this eclipse.

August 27, 1969 Lunar Eclipse Parameters
Parameter	Value
Penumbral Magnitude	0.01337
Umbral Magnitude	−0.95141
Gamma	−1.54066
Sun Right Ascension	10h23m30.2s
Sun Declination	+10°03'05.7"
Sun Semi-Diameter	15'50.0"
Sun Equatorial Horizontal Parallax	08.7"
Moon Right Ascension	22h26m20.1s
Moon Declination	-11°25'58.1"
Moon Semi-Diameter	16'24.7"
Moon Equatorial Horizontal Parallax	1°00'13.8"
ΔT	39.8 s

== Eclipse season ==
This eclipse is part of an eclipse season, a period, roughly every six months, when eclipses occur. Only two (or occasionally three) eclipse seasons occur each year, and each season lasts about 35 days and repeats just short of six months (173 days) later; thus two full eclipse seasons always occur each year. Either two or three eclipses happen each eclipse season. In the sequence below, each eclipse is separated by a fortnight. The first and last eclipse in this sequence is separated by one synodic month.

Eclipse season of August–September 1969
August 27 Ascending node (full moon)	September 11 Descending node (new moon)	September 25 Ascending node (full moon)
Penumbral lunar eclipse Lunar Saros 108	Annular solar eclipse Solar Saros 134	Penumbral lunar eclipse Lunar Saros 146

== Related eclipses ==
=== Eclipses in 1969 ===
- An annular solar eclipse on March 18.
- A penumbral lunar eclipse on April 2.
- A penumbral lunar eclipse on August 27.
- An annular solar eclipse on September 11.
- A penumbral lunar eclipse on September 25.

=== Metonic ===
- Followed by: Lunar eclipse of June 15, 1973

=== Tzolkinex ===
- Preceded by: Lunar eclipse of July 17, 1962

=== Lunar Saros 108 ===
- Preceded by: Lunar eclipse of August 17, 1951

=== Inex ===
- Followed by: Lunar eclipse of August 8, 1998

=== Triad ===
- Followed by: Lunar eclipse of June 27, 2056

=== Lunar eclipses of 1969–1973 ===
This eclipse is a member of a semester series. An eclipse in a semester series of lunar eclipses repeats approximately every 177 days and 4 hours (a semester) at alternating nodes of the Moon's orbit.

The penumbral lunar eclipses on April 2, 1969 and September 25, 1969 occur in the previous lunar year eclipse set, and the lunar eclipses on June 15, 1973 (penumbral) and December 10, 1973 (partial) occur in the next lunar year eclipse set.

Lunar eclipse series sets from 1969 to 1973
Ascending node				Descending node			
Saros	Date Viewing	Type Chart	Gamma	Saros	Date Viewing	Type Chart	Gamma
108	1969 Aug 27	Penumbral	−1.5407	113	1970 Feb 21	Partial	0.9620
118	1970 Aug 17	Partial	−0.8053	123	1971 Feb 10	Total	0.2741
128	1971 Aug 06	Total	−0.0794	133	1972 Jan 30	Total	−0.4273
138	1972 Jul 26	Partial	0.7117	143	1973 Jan 18	Penumbral	−1.0845
148	1973 Jul 15	Penumbral	1.5178				

=== Saros 108 ===
This eclipse is a part of Saros series 108, repeating every 18 years, 11 days, and containing 72 events. The series started with a penumbral lunar eclipse on July 8, 689 AD. It contains partial eclipses from February 9, 1050 through May 17, 1212; total eclipses from May 28, 1230 through September 23, 1428; and a second set of partial eclipses from October 5, 1446 through June 1, 1825. The series ends at member 72 as a penumbral eclipse on August 27, 1969.

The longest duration of totality was produced by member 35 at 105 minutes, 57 seconds on July 10, 1302. All eclipses in this series occur at the Moon’s ascending node of orbit.

Greatest	First			
The greatest eclipse of the series occurred on 1302 Jul 10, lasting 105 minutes, 57 seconds.	Penumbral	Partial	Total	Central
The greatest eclipse of the series occurred on 1302 Jul 10, lasting 105 minutes, 57 seconds.	689 Jul 08	1050 Feb 09	1230 May 28	1266 Jun 19
The greatest eclipse of the series occurred on 1302 Jul 10, lasting 105 minutes, 57 seconds.	Last			
The greatest eclipse of the series occurred on 1302 Jul 10, lasting 105 minutes, 57 seconds.	Central	Total	Partial	Penumbral
The greatest eclipse of the series occurred on 1302 Jul 10, lasting 105 minutes, 57 seconds.	1374 Aug 22	1428 Sep 23	1825 Jun 01	1969 Aug 27

Eclipses are tabulated in three columns; every third eclipse in the same column is one exeligmos apart, so they all cast shadows over approximately the same parts of the Earth.

Series members 63–72 occur between 1801 and 1969:
63	64	65
1807 May 21	1825 Jun 01	1843 Jun 12
66	67	68
1861 Jun 22	1879 Jul 03	1897 Jul 14
69	70	71
1915 Jul 26	1933 Aug 05	1951 Aug 17
72
1969 Aug 27

=== Tritos series ===
This eclipse is a part of a tritos cycle, repeating at alternating nodes every 135 synodic months (≈ 3986.63 days, or 11 years minus 1 month). Their appearance and longitude are irregular due to a lack of synchronization with the anomalistic month (period of perigee), but groupings of 3 tritos cycles (≈ 33 years minus 3 months) come close (≈ 434.044 anomalistic months), so eclipses are similar in these groupings.

Series members between 1904 and 2200
1904 Mar 02 (Saros 102)	1915 Jan 31 (Saros 103)			
	1969 Aug 27 (Saros 108)	1980 Jul 27 (Saros 109)	1991 Jun 27 (Saros 110)	2002 May 26 (Saros 111)
2013 Apr 25 (Saros 112)	2024 Mar 25 (Saros 113)	2035 Feb 22 (Saros 114)	2046 Jan 22 (Saros 115)	2056 Dec 22 (Saros 116)
2067 Nov 21 (Saros 117)	2078 Oct 21 (Saros 118)	2089 Sep 19 (Saros 119)	2100 Aug 19 (Saros 120)	2111 Jul 21 (Saros 121)
2122 Jun 20 (Saros 122)	2133 May 19 (Saros 123)	2144 Apr 18 (Saros 124)	2155 Mar 19 (Saros 125)	2166 Feb 15 (Saros 126)
2177 Jan 14 (Saros 127)	2187 Dec 15 (Saros 128)	2198 Nov 13 (Saros 129)		

=== Inex series ===
This eclipse is a part of the long period inex cycle, repeating at alternating nodes, every 358 synodic months (≈ 10,571.95 days, or 29 years minus 20 days). Their appearance and longitude are irregular due to a lack of synchronization with the anomalistic month (period of perigee). However, groupings of 3 inex cycles (≈ 87 years minus 2 months) comes close (≈ 1,151.02 anomalistic months), so eclipses are similar in these groupings.

Series members between 1801 and 2200
1824 Dec 06 (Saros 103)		
		1969 Aug 27 (Saros 108)
1998 Aug 08 (Saros 109)	2027 Jul 18 (Saros 110)	2056 Jun 27 (Saros 111)
2085 Jun 08 (Saros 112)	2114 May 19 (Saros 113)	2143 Apr 29 (Saros 114)
2172 Apr 09 (Saros 115)

== See also ==
- List of lunar eclipses
- List of 20th-century lunar eclipses
