= August 1951 lunar eclipse =

Penumbral lunar eclipse August 17, 1951

- Penumbral eclipse
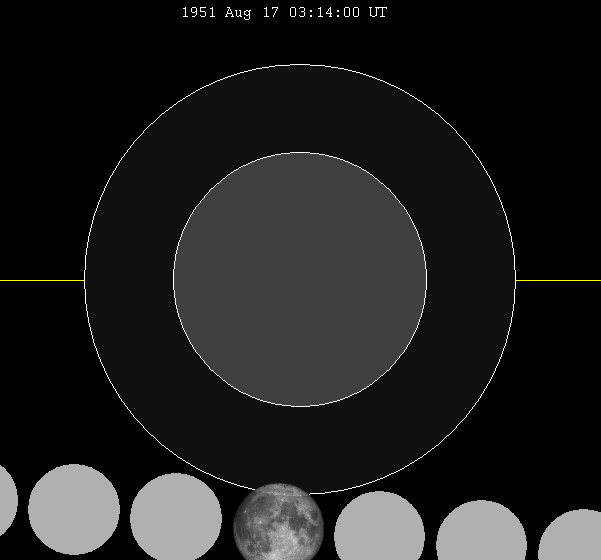
- The Moon's hourly motion shown right to left
- Date: August 17, 1951
- Gamma: −1.4828
- Magnitude: −0.8455
- Saros cycle: 108 (71 of 72)
- Penumbral: 93 minutes, 36 seconds
Contacts (UTC)
- P1: 2:27:14
- Greatest: 3:14:09
- P4: 4:00:50

A penumbral lunar eclipse occurred at the Moon’s ascending node of orbit on Friday, August 17, 1951, with an umbral magnitude of −0.8455. A lunar eclipse occurs when the Moon moves into the Earth's shadow, causing the Moon to be darkened. A penumbral lunar eclipse occurs when part or all of the Moon's near side passes into the Earth's penumbra. Unlike a solar eclipse, which can only be viewed from a relatively small area of the world, a lunar eclipse may be viewed from anywhere on the night side of Earth. Occurring about 1.9 days after perigee (on August 15, 1951, at 5:05 UTC), the Moon's apparent diameter was larger.

This eclipse was the third of four penumbral lunar eclipses in 1951, with the others occurring on February 21, March 23, and September 15.

== Visibility ==
The eclipse was completely visible over eastern and central North America, South America, western Europe, and much of Africa, seen rising over northwestern North America and setting over Eastern Europe, east Africa, and the Middle East.

Simulated views of Earth from moon
| Center of moon | Lunar north pole |

== Eclipse details ==
Shown below is a table displaying details about this particular lunar eclipse. It describes various parameters pertaining to this eclipse.

August 17, 1951 Lunar Eclipse Parameters
| Parameter | Value |
|---|---|
| Penumbral Magnitude | 0.11962 |
| Umbral Magnitude | −0.84547 |
| Gamma | −1.48284 |
| Sun Right Ascension | 09h43m00.9s |
| Sun Declination | +13°43'00.9" |
| Sun Semi-Diameter | 15'47.8" |
| Sun Equatorial Horizontal Parallax | 08.7" |
| Moon Right Ascension | 21h45m34.5s |
| Moon Declination | -15°03'57.5" |
| Moon Semi-Diameter | 16'22.1" |
| Moon Equatorial Horizontal Parallax | 1°00'04.5" |
| ΔT | 29.7 s |

== Eclipse season ==
This eclipse is part of an eclipse season, a period, roughly every six months, when eclipses occur. Only two (or occasionally three) eclipse seasons occur each year, and each season lasts about 35 days and repeats just short of six months (173 days) later; thus two full eclipse seasons always occur each year. Either two or three eclipses happen each eclipse season. In the sequence below, each eclipse is separated by a fortnight. The first and last eclipse in this sequence is separated by one synodic month.

Eclipse season of August–September 1951
| August 17 Ascending node (full moon) | September 1 Descending node (new moon) | September 15 Ascending node (full moon) |
|---|---|---|
| Penumbral lunar eclipse Lunar Saros 108 | Annular solar eclipse Solar Saros 134 | Penumbral lunar eclipse Lunar Saros 146 |

== Related eclipses ==
=== Eclipses in 1951 ===
- A penumbral lunar eclipse on February 21.
- An annular solar eclipse on March 7.
- A penumbral lunar eclipse on March 23.
- A penumbral lunar eclipse on August 17.
- An annular solar eclipse on September 1.
- A penumbral lunar eclipse on September 15.

=== Metonic ===
- Followed by: Lunar eclipse of June 5, 1955

=== Tzolkinex ===
- Preceded by: Lunar eclipse of July 6, 1944

=== Half-Saros ===
- Preceded by: Solar eclipse of August 12, 1942

=== Tritos ===
- Followed by: Lunar eclipse of July 17, 1962

=== Lunar Saros 108 ===
- Preceded by: Lunar eclipse of August 5, 1933
- Followed by: Lunar eclipse of August 27, 1969

=== Inex ===
- Followed by: Lunar eclipse of July 27, 1980

=== Triad ===
- Preceded by: Lunar eclipse of October 15, 1864
- Followed by: Lunar eclipse of June 17, 2038

=== Lunar eclipses of 1951–1955 ===
This eclipse is a member of a semester series. An eclipse in a semester series of lunar eclipses repeats approximately every 177 days and 4 hours (a semester) at alternating nodes of the Moon's orbit.

The penumbral lunar eclipses on March 23, 1951 and September 15, 1951 occur in the previous lunar year eclipse set, and the lunar eclipses on June 5, 1955 (penumbral) and November 29, 1955 (partial) occur in the next lunar year eclipse set.

Lunar eclipse series sets from 1951 to 1955
| Descending node | | | | Ascending node | | | |
| Saros | Date Viewing | Type Chart | Gamma | Saros | Date Viewing | Type Chart | Gamma |
| 103 | 1951 Feb 21 | Penumbral | − | 108 | 1951 Aug 17 | Penumbral | −1.4828 |
| 113 | 1952 Feb 11 | Partial | 0.9416 | 118 | 1952 Aug 05 | Partial | −0.7384 |
| 123 | 1953 Jan 29 | Total | 0.2606 | 128 | 1953 Jul 26 | Total | −0.0071 |
| 133 | 1954 Jan 19 | Total | −0.4357 | 138 | 1954 Jul 16 | Partial | 0.7877 |
| 143 | 1955 Jan 08 | Penumbral | −1.0907 | | | | |

=== Metonic series ===
The Metonic cycle repeats nearly exactly every 19 years and represents a Saros cycle plus one lunar year. Because it occurs on the same calendar date, the Earth's shadow will in nearly the same location relative to the background stars.

Metonic lunar eclipse sets 1951–2027
| Descending node | | | Ascending node | | |
| Saros | Date | Type | Saros | Date | Type |
|---|---|---|---|---|---|
| 103 | 1951 Feb 21.88 | Penumbral | 108 | 1951 Aug 17.13 | Penumbral |
| 113 | 1970 Feb 21.35 | Partial | 118 | 1970 Aug 17.14 | Partial |
| 123 | 1989 Feb 20.64 | Total | 128 | 1989 Aug 17.13 | Total |
| 133 | 2008 Feb 21.14 | Total | 138 | 2008 Aug 16.88 | Partial |
| 143 | 2027 Feb 20.96 | Penumbral | 148 | 2027 Aug 17.30 | Penumbral |

=== Saros 108 ===
This eclipse is a part of Saros series 108, repeating every 18 years, 11 days, and containing 72 events. The series started with a penumbral lunar eclipse on July 8, 689 AD. It contains partial eclipses from February 9, 1050 through May 17, 1212; total eclipses from May 28, 1230 through September 23, 1428; and a second set of partial eclipses from October 5, 1446 through June 1, 1825. The series ends at member 72 as a penumbral eclipse on August 27, 1969.

The longest duration of totality was produced by member 35 at 105 minutes, 57 seconds on July 10, 1302. All eclipses in this series occur at the Moon’s ascending node of orbit.

| Greatest | First | | | |
|---|---|---|---|---|
| The greatest eclipse of the series occurred on 1302 Jul 10, lasting 105 minutes, 57 seconds. | Penumbral | Partial | Total | Central |
| The greatest eclipse of the series occurred on 1302 Jul 10, lasting 105 minutes, 57 seconds. | 689 Jul 08 | 1050 Feb 09 | 1230 May 28 | 1266 Jun 19 |
| The greatest eclipse of the series occurred on 1302 Jul 10, lasting 105 minutes, 57 seconds. | Last | | | |
| The greatest eclipse of the series occurred on 1302 Jul 10, lasting 105 minutes, 57 seconds. | Central | Total | Partial | Penumbral |
| The greatest eclipse of the series occurred on 1302 Jul 10, lasting 105 minutes, 57 seconds. | 1374 Aug 22 | 1428 Sep 23 | 1825 Jun 01 | 1969 Aug 27 |

Eclipses are tabulated in three columns; every third eclipse in the same column is one exeligmos apart, so they all cast shadows over approximately the same parts of the Earth.

Series members 63–72 occur between 1801 and 1969:
| 63 | 64 | 65 |
|---|---|---|
| 1807 May 21 | 1825 Jun 01 | 1843 Jun 12 |
| 66 | 67 | 68 |
| 1861 Jun 22 | 1879 Jul 03 | 1897 Jul 14 |
| 69 | 70 | 71 |
| 1915 Jul 26 | 1933 Aug 05 | 1951 Aug 17 |
72
1969 Aug 27

=== Tritos series ===
This eclipse is a part of a tritos cycle, repeating at alternating nodes every 135 synodic months (≈ 3986.63 days, or 11 years minus 1 month). Their appearance and longitude are irregular due to a lack of synchronization with the anomalistic month (period of perigee), but groupings of 3 tritos cycles (≈ 33 years minus 3 months) come close (≈ 434.044 anomalistic months), so eclipses are similar in these groupings.

Series members between 1886 and 2200
| 1886 Feb 18 (Saros 102) | 1897 Jan 18 (Saros 103) | | | |
| | 1951 Aug 17 (Saros 108) | 1962 Jul 17 (Saros 109) | 1973 Jun 15 (Saros 110) | 1984 May 15 (Saros 111) |
| 1995 Apr 15 (Saros 112) | 2006 Mar 14 (Saros 113) | 2017 Feb 11 (Saros 114) | 2028 Jan 12 (Saros 115) | 2038 Dec 11 (Saros 116) |
| 2049 Nov 09 (Saros 117) | 2060 Oct 09 (Saros 118) | 2071 Sep 09 (Saros 119) | 2082 Aug 08 (Saros 120) | 2093 Jul 08 (Saros 121) |
| 2104 Jun 08 (Saros 122) | 2115 May 08 (Saros 123) | 2126 Apr 07 (Saros 124) | 2137 Mar 07 (Saros 125) | 2148 Feb 04 (Saros 126) |
| 2159 Jan 04 (Saros 127) | 2169 Dec 04 (Saros 128) | 2180 Nov 02 (Saros 129) | 2191 Oct 02 (Saros 130) | |

=== Inex series ===
This eclipse is a part of the long period inex cycle, repeating at alternating nodes, every 358 synodic months (≈ 10,571.95 days, or 29 years minus 20 days). Their appearance and longitude are irregular due to a lack of synchronization with the anomalistic month (period of perigee). However, groupings of 3 inex cycles (≈ 87 years minus 2 months) comes close (≈ 1,151.02 anomalistic months), so eclipses are similar in these groupings.

Series members between 1801 and 2200
| 1806 Nov 26 (Saros 103) | | 1864 Oct 15 (Saros 105) |
| 1893 Sep 25 (Saros 106) | | 1951 Aug 17 (Saros 108) |
| 1980 Jul 27 (Saros 109) | 2009 Jul 07 (Saros 110) | 2038 Jun 17 (Saros 111) |
| 2067 May 28 (Saros 112) | 2096 May 07 (Saros 113) | 2125 Apr 18 (Saros 114) |
| 2154 Mar 29 (Saros 115) | 2183 Mar 09 (Saros 116) | |

=== Half-Saros cycle ===
A lunar eclipse will be preceded and followed by solar eclipses by 9 years and 5.5 days (a half saros). This lunar eclipse is related to one partial solar eclipse of Solar Saros 115.

August 12, 1942
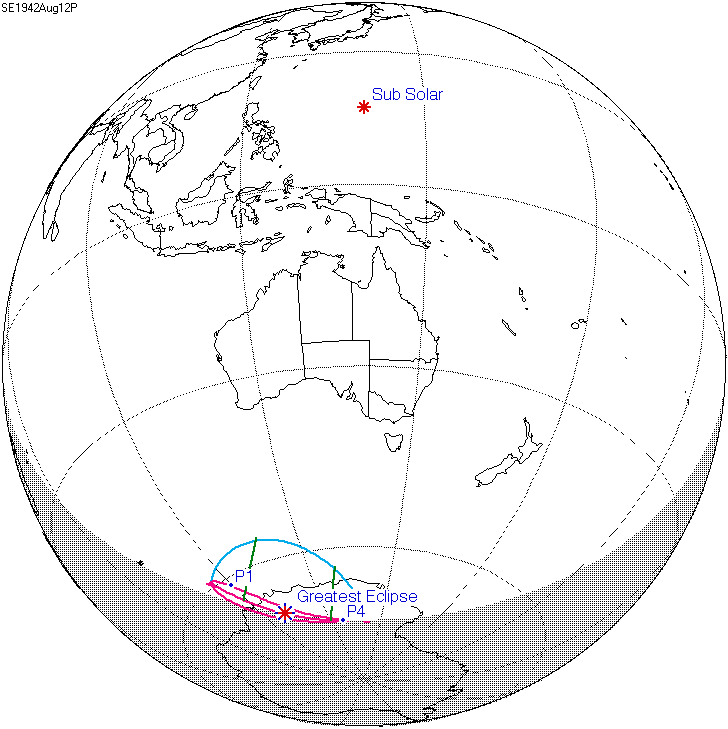

== See also ==
- List of lunar eclipses
- List of 20th-century lunar eclipses
