= Lunar Saros 108 =

Series of lunar eclipses

Saros cycle series 108 for lunar eclipses occurred at the moon's ascending node, 18 years 11 and 1/3 days. It contained 72 events.

This lunar saros was linked to Solar Saros 115.

Cat.	Saros	Mem	Date	Time UT (hr:mn)	Type	Gamma	Magnitude	Duration (min)			Contacts UT (hr:mn)						Chart
Cat.	Saros	Mem	Date	Greatest	Type	Gamma	Magnitude	Pen.	Par.	Tot.	P1	P4	U1	U2	U3	U4	Chart
06493	108	1	689 Jul 08	9:04:39	Penumbral	1.5561	-1.0111	37.9			8:45:42	9:23:36					
06538	108	2	707 Jul 19	15:57:32	Penumbral	1.4877	-0.8881	111.6			15:01:44	16:53:20					
06582	108	3	725 Jul 29	22:53:00	Penumbral	1.4218	-0.7699	151.0			21:37:30	0:08:30					
06626	108	4	743 Aug 10	5:54:17	Penumbral	1.3608	-0.6608	179.3			4:24:38	7:23:56					
06670	108	5	761 Aug 20	12:59:01	Penumbral	1.3031	-0.5578	202.0			11:18:01	14:40:01					
06713	108	6	779 Aug 31	20:12:04	Penumbral	1.2523	-0.4676	219.8			18:22:10	22:01:58					
06755	108	7	797 Sep 11	3:30:50	Penumbral	1.2065	-0.3866	234.5			1:33:35	5:28:05					
06796	108	8	815 Sep 22	10:58:23	Penumbral	1.1683	-0.3194	246.1			8:55:20	13:01:26					
06837	108	9	833 Oct 02	18:32:17	Penumbral	1.1356	-0.2622	255.6			16:24:29	20:40:05					
06877	108	10	851 Oct 14	2:15:28	Penumbral	1.1107	-0.2193	262.7			0:04:07	4:26:49					
06918	108	11	869 Oct 24	10:04:36	Penumbral	1.0909	-0.1854	268.4			7:50:24	12:18:48					
06959	108	12	887 Nov 04	17:59:53	Penumbral	1.0765	-0.1611	272.7			15:43:32	20:16:14					
07001	108	13	905 Nov 15	2:00:01	Penumbral	1.0662	-0.1441	275.9			23:42:04	4:17:58					
07041	108	14	923 Nov 26	10:04:30	Penumbral	1.0602	-0.1346	278.0			7:45:30	12:23:30					
07082	108	15	941 Dec 06	18:10:10	Penumbral	1.0551	-0.1263	279.8			15:50:16	20:30:04					
07123	108	16	959 Dec 18	2:15:57	Penumbral	1.0504	-0.1185	281.4			23:55:15	4:36:39					
07164	108	17	977 Dec 28	10:20:09	Penumbral	1.0448	-0.1086	283.0			7:58:39	12:41:39					
07206	108	18	996 Jan 08	18:21:43	Penumbral	1.0376	-0.0952	284.9			15:59:16	20:44:10					
07250	108	19	1014 Jan 19	2:16:49	Penumbral	1.0254	-0.0726	287.5			23:53:04	4:40:34					
07295	108	20	1032 Jan 30	10:06:26	Penumbral	1.0092	-0.0421	290.9			7:40:59	12:31:53					
07340	108	21	1050 Feb 09	17:47:23	Partial	0.9861	0.0013	295.3	8.9		15:19:44	20:15:02	17:42:56			17:51:50	
07384	108	22	1068 Feb 21	1:20:57	Partial	0.9572	0.0555	300.5	57.8		22:50:42	3:51:12	0:52:03			1:49:51	
07428	108	23	1086 Mar 03	8:43:45	Partial	0.9199	0.1254	306.9	86.1		6:10:18	11:17:12	8:00:42			9:26:48	
07474	108	24	1104 Mar 13	15:58:54	Partial	0.8762	0.207	313.8	109.3		13:22:00	18:35:48	15:04:15			16:53:33	
07520	108	25	1122 Mar 24	23:03:27	Partial	0.824	0.3044	321.4	130.7		20:22:45	1:44:09	21:58:06			0:08:48	
07566	108	26	1140 Apr 4	5:59:42	Partial	0.7647	0.4147	329.2	150		3:15:06	8:44:18	4:44:42			7:14:42	
07613	108	27	1158 Apr 15	12:47:06	Partial	0.6979	0.5388	337.1	167.7		9:58:33	15:35:39	11:23:15			14:10:57	
07660	108	28	1176 Apr 25	19:28:08	Partial	0.6255	0.6732	344.6	183.3		16:35:50	22:20:26	17:56:29			20:59:47	
07706	108	29	1194 May 7	2:03:17	Partial	0.5479	0.8169	351.5	196.8		23:07:32	4:59:02	0:24:53			3:41:41	
07752	108	30	1212 May 17	8:32:49	Partial	0.4652	0.9699	357.6	208.5		5:34:01	11:31:37	6:48:34			10:17:04	
07799	108	31	1230 May 28	15:00:09	Total	0.3801	1.1271	362.6	217.9	56.8	11:58:51	18:01:27	13:11:12	14:31:45	15:28:33	16:49:06	
07844	108	32	1248 Jun 07	21:24:58	Total	0.2922	1.2892	366.5	225.2	81.0	18:21:43	0:28:13	19:32:22	20:44:28	22:05:28	23:17:34	
07889	108	33	1266 Jun 19	3:50:18	Total	0.2044	1.4511	369.2	230.3	94.8	0:45:42	6:54:54	1:55:09	3:02:54	4:37:42	5:45:27	
07934	108	34	1284 Jun 29	10:16:00	Total	0.1164	1.6131	370.7	233.4	102.7	7:10:39	13:21:21	8:19:18	9:24:39	11:07:21	12:12:42	
07979	108	35	1302 Jul 10	16:46:06	Total	0.0313	1.7694	371.0	234.5	105.9	13:40:36	19:51:36	14:48:51	15:53:09	17:39:03	18:43:21	
08022	108	36	1320 Jul 20	23:20:21	Total	-0.0510	1.7335	370.2	233.9	105.3	20:15:15	2:25:27	21:23:24	22:27:42	0:13:00	1:17:18	
08064	108	37	1338 Aug 01	6:00:25	Total	-0.1292	1.5901	368.4	231.8	101.4	2:56:13	9:04:37	4:04:31	5:09:43	6:51:07	7:56:19	
08106	108	38	1356 Aug 11	12:47:57	Total	-0.2017	1.4568	365.9	228.4	94.4	9:45:00	15:50:54	10:53:45	12:00:45	13:35:09	14:42:09	
08147	108	39	1374 Aug 22	19:44:13	Total	-0.2675	1.3358	362.9	224.2	84.8	16:42:46	22:45:40	17:52:07	19:01:49	20:26:37	21:36:19	
08188	108	40	1392 Sep 02	2:49:46	Total	-0.3265	1.2271	359.5	219.4	72.3	23:50:01	5:49:31	1:00:04	2:13:37	3:25:55	4:39:28	
08229	108	41	1410 Sep 13	10:04:27	Total	-0.3788	1.1308	355.9	214.2	56.6	7:06:30	13:02:24	8:17:21	9:36:09	10:32:45	11:51:33	
08271	108	42	1428 Sep 23	17:29:54	Total	-0.4230	1.0492	352.5	209.1	35.6	14:33:39	20:26:09	15:45:21	17:12:06	17:47:42	19:14:27	
08313	108	43	1446 Oct 05	1:05:29	Partial	-0.4596	0.9818	349.2	204.4		22:10:53	4:00:05	23:23:17			2:47:41	
08354	108	44	1464 Oct 15	8:50:47	Partial	-0.4889	0.9280	346.2	200.2		5:57:41	11:43:53	7:10:41			10:30:53	
08394	108	45	1482 Oct 26	16:45:28	Partial	-0.5111	0.8871	343.6	196.7		13:53:40	19:37:16	15:07:07			18:23:49	
08434	108	46	1500 Nov 06	0:48:33	Partial	-0.5272	0.8577	341.4	193.9		21:57:51	3:39:15	23:11:36			2:25:30	
08474	108	47	1518 Nov 17	8:59:11	Partial	-0.5379	0.8385	339.5	191.9		6:09:26	11:48:56	7:23:14			10:35:08	
08515	108	48	1536 Nov 27	17:14:01	Partial	-0.5457	0.8249	337.8	190.3		14:25:07	20:02:55	15:38:52			18:49:10	
08557	108	49	1554 Dec 09	1:34:26	Partial	-0.5496	0.8188	336.3	189.3		22:46:17	4:22:35	23:59:47			3:09:05	
08600	108	50	1572 Dec 19	9:56:07	Partial	-0.5525	0.8148	334.8	188.5		7:08:43	12:43:31	8:21:52			11:30:22	
08643	108	51	1591 Jan 09	18:19:22	Partial	-0.5552	0.8116	333.3	187.7		15:32:43	21:06:01	16:45:31			19:53:13	
08687	108	52	1609 Jan 20	2:39:41	Partial	-0.5607	0.8034	331.4	186.5		23:53:59	5:25:23	1:06:26			4:12:56	
08732	108	53	1627 Jan 31	10:59:17	Partial	-0.5675	0.7932	329.4	185.2		8:14:35	13:43:59	9:26:41			12:31:53	
08776	108	54	1645 Feb 10	19:13:47	Partial	-0.5789	0.7748	326.8	183.1		16:30:23	21:57:11	17:42:14			20:45:20	
08821	108	55	1663 Feb 22	3:23:34	Partial	-0.5950	0.7481	323.8	180.2		0:41:40	6:05:28	1:53:28			4:53:40	
08867	108	56	1681 Mar 04	11:26:33	Partial	-0.6173	0.7101	320.1	176.2		8:46:30	14:06:36	9:58:27			12:54:39	
08913	108	57	1699 Mar 15	19:23:52	Partial	-0.6453	0.6619	315.7	171.0		16:46:01	22:01:43	17:58:22			20:49:22	
08959	108	58	1717 Mar 27	3:13:41	Partial	-0.6800	0.6013	310.4	164.1		0:38:29	5:48:53	1:51:38			4:35:44	
09006	108	59	1735 Apr 07	10:56:51	Partial	-0.7210	0.5292	304.2	155.3		8:24:45	13:28:57	9:39:12			12:14:30	
09053	108	60	1753 Apr 17	18:33:18	Partial	-0.7683	0.4454	297.0	143.9		16:04:48	21:01:48	17:21:21			19:45:15	
09099	108	61	1771 Apr 29	2:04:10	Partial	-0.8211	0.3515	288.5	129.3		23:39:55	4:28:25	0:59:31			3:08:49	
09144	108	62	1789 May 9	9:28:39	Partial	-0.8799	0.2465	278.7	109.6		7:09:18	11:48:00	8:33:51			10:23:27	
09189	108	63	1807 May 21	16:49:32	Partial	-0.9423	0.1346	267.4	82.0		14:35:50	19:03:14	16:08:32			17:30:32	
09234	108	64	1825 Jun 01	0:06:18	Partial	-1.0089	0.0149	254.4	27.6		21:59:06	2:13:30	23:52:30			0:20:06	
09280	108	65	1843 Jun 12	7:22:16	Penumbral	-1.0767	-0.1073	240.0			5:22:16	9:22:16					
09325	108	66	1861 Jun 22	14:35:14	Penumbral	-1.1476	-0.2355	223.2			12:43:38	16:26:50					
09369	108	67	1879 Jul 03	21:50:28	Penumbral	-1.2172	-0.3618	204.6			20:08:10	23:32:46					
09413	108	68	1897 Jul 14	5:05:19	Penumbral	-1.2879	-0.4902	183.0			3:33:49	6:36:49					
09455	108	69	1915 Jul 26	12:24:39	Penumbral	-1.3553	-0.6129	158.7			11:05:18	13:44:00					
09497	108	70	1933 Aug 05	19:46:05	Penumbral	-1.4216	-0.7338	129.5			18:41:20	20:50:50					
09538	108	71	1951 Aug 17	3:14:39	Penumbral	-1.4828	-0.8456	93.6			2:27:51	4:01:27					
09579	108	72	1969 Aug 27	10:48:15	Penumbral	-1.5407	-0.9516	31.3			10:32:36	11:03:54					

== See also ==
- List of lunar eclipses
  - List of Saros series for lunar eclipses
