= Solar eclipse of February 5, 1962 =

Total eclipse

- Total eclipse
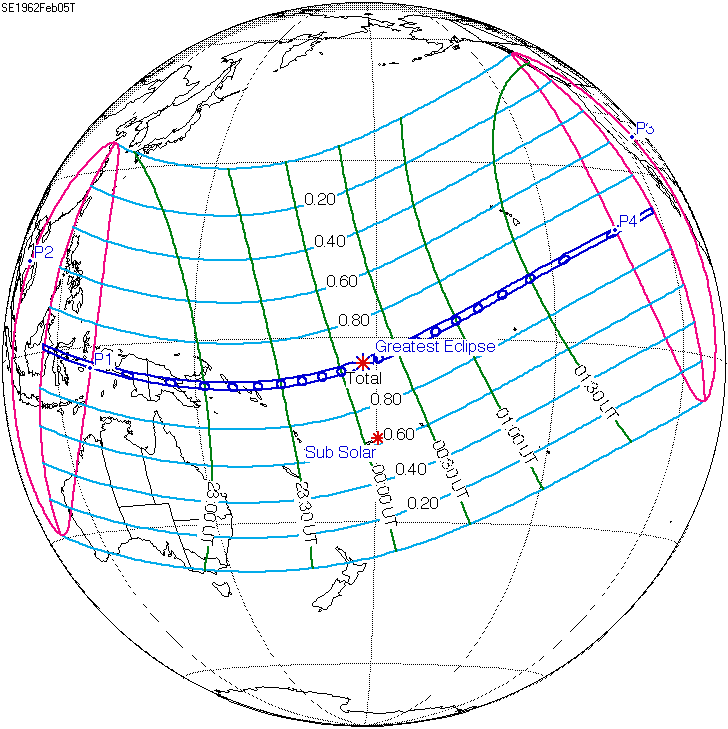
- Map
- Gamma: 0.2107
- Magnitude: 1.043

Maximum eclipse
- Duration: 248 s (4 min 8 s)
- Coordinates: 4.2°S 178.1°E
- Max. width of band: 147 km (91 mi)

Times (UTC)
- Greatest eclipse: 0:12:38

References
- Saros: 130 (49 of 73)
- Catalog # (SE5000): 9424

A total solar eclipse occurred at the Moon's descending node of orbit between Sunday, February 4 and Monday, February 5, 1962, with a magnitude of 1.043. A solar eclipse occurs when the Moon passes between Earth and the Sun, thereby totally or partly obscuring the image of the Sun for a viewer on Earth. A total solar eclipse occurs when the Moon's apparent diameter is larger than the Sun's, blocking all direct sunlight, turning day into darkness. Totality occurs in a narrow path across Earth's surface, with the partial solar eclipse visible over a surrounding region thousands of kilometres wide. Occurring about 21.5 hours before perigee (on February 5, 1962, at 21:40 UTC), the Moon's apparent diameter was larger.

Totality was visible from Indonesia, Netherlands New Guinea (now belonging to Indonesia), the Territory of Papua New Guinea (today's Papua New Guinea), British Solomon Islands (today's Solomon Islands), and Palmyra Atoll. A partial eclipse was visible for parts of East Asia, Australia, Oceania, Hawaii, and western North America. Among these places, the eclipse was on February 5 west of the International Date Line, and February 4 east of it.

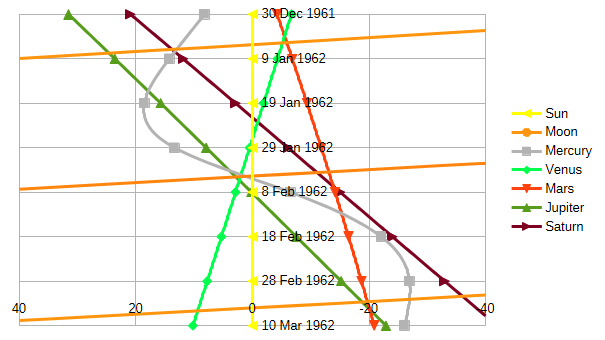
Ecliptic longitude of the five naked-eye planets and the moon minus that of the sun in early 1962. East is to the left. A total eclipse occurred on February 5, during which Mercury, Venus, and Jupiter were less than 3° to the east and Mars and Saturn less than 14° to the west of the sun.

The date of this eclipse visible from Asia, February 5, was also Lunar New Year celebrated in multiple countries. The five naked-eye planets (Mercury, Venus, Mars, Jupiter, and Saturn) were all near the sun at the time, and could all be seen simultaneously by any observers watching the total eclipse.

== Observation ==
A team sent by Kyoto University of Japan observed this eclipse in Lae, the second largest city and a port on the east coast of the Territory Papua New Guinea. The spectrum was analyzed with spectrophotometry, and photometry of the inner corona was conducted.

== Eclipse details ==
Shown below are two tables displaying details about this particular solar eclipse. The first table outlines times at which the Moon's penumbra or umbra attains the specific parameter, and the second table describes various other parameters pertaining to this eclipse.

February 5, 1962 Solar Eclipse Times
Event	Time (UTC)
First Penumbral External Contact	1962 February 4 at 21:34:34.9 UTC
First Umbral External Contact	1962 February 4 at 22:30:37.9 UTC
First Central Line	1962 February 4 at 22:31:19.7 UTC
First Umbral Internal Contact	1962 February 4 at 22:32:01.6 UTC
First Penumbral Internal Contact	1962 February 4 at 23:30:13.6 UTC
Greatest Duration	1962 February 5 at 00:10:27.2 UTC
Ecliptic Conjunction	1962 February 5 at 00:10:27.6 UTC
Greatest Eclipse	1962 February 5 at 00:12:37.8 UTC
Equatorial Conjunction	1962 February 5 at 00:17:05.8 UTC
Last Penumbral Internal Contact	1962 February 5 at 00:54:55.5 UTC
Last Umbral Internal Contact	1962 February 5 at 01:53:09.3 UTC
Last Central Line	1962 February 5 at 01:53:52.4 UTC
Last Umbral External Contact	1962 February 5 at 01:54:35.4 UTC
Last Penumbral External Contact	1962 February 5 at 02:50:36.1 UTC

February 5, 1962 Solar Eclipse Parameters
Parameter	Value
Eclipse Magnitude	1.04296
Eclipse Obscuration	1.08777
Gamma	0.21066
Sun Right Ascension	21h12m42.3s
Sun Declination	-16°07'38.7"
Sun Semi-Diameter	16'13.3"
Sun Equatorial Horizontal Parallax	08.9"
Moon Right Ascension	21h12m31.6s
Moon Declination	-15°55'04.4"
Moon Semi-Diameter	16'38.3"
Moon Equatorial Horizontal Parallax	1°01'03.7"
ΔT	34.0 s

== Eclipse season ==
This eclipse is part of an eclipse season, a period, roughly every six months, when eclipses occur. Only two (or occasionally three) eclipse seasons occur each year, and each season lasts about 35 days and repeats just short of six months (173 days) later; thus two full eclipse seasons always occur each year. Either two or three eclipses happen each eclipse season. In the sequence below, each eclipse is separated by a fortnight.

Eclipse season of February 1962
February 5 Descending node (new moon)	February 19 Ascending node (full moon)
Total solar eclipse Solar Saros 130	Penumbral lunar eclipse Lunar Saros 142

== Related eclipses ==
=== Eclipses in 1962 ===
- A total solar eclipse on February 5.
- A penumbral lunar eclipse on February 19.
- A penumbral lunar eclipse on July 17.
- An annular solar eclipse on July 31.
- A penumbral lunar eclipse on August 15.

=== Metonic ===
- Preceded by: Solar eclipse of April 19, 1958
- Followed by: Solar eclipse of November 23, 1965

=== Tzolkinex ===
- Preceded by: Solar eclipse of December 25, 1954
- Followed by: Solar eclipse of March 18, 1969

=== Half-Saros ===
- Preceded by: Lunar eclipse of January 29, 1953
- Followed by: Lunar eclipse of February 10, 1971

=== Tritos ===
- Preceded by: Solar eclipse of March 7, 1951
- Followed by: Solar eclipse of January 4, 1973

=== Solar Saros 130 ===
- Preceded by: Solar eclipse of January 25, 1944
- Followed by: Solar eclipse of February 16, 1980

=== Inex ===
- Preceded by: Solar eclipse of February 24, 1933
- Followed by: Solar eclipse of January 15, 1991

=== Triad ===
- Preceded by: Solar eclipse of April 6, 1875
- Followed by: Solar eclipse of December 5, 2048

=== Solar eclipses of 1961–1964 ===
This eclipse is a member of a semester series. An eclipse in a semester series of solar eclipses repeats approximately every 177 days and 4 hours (a semester) at alternating nodes of the Moon's orbit.

The partial solar eclipses on June 10, 1964 and December 4, 1964 occur in the next lunar year eclipse set.

Solar eclipse series sets from 1961 to 1964
Descending node			Ascending node		
Saros	Map	Gamma	Saros	Map	Gamma
120	February 15, 1961 Total	0.883	125	August 11, 1961 Annular	−0.8859
130	February 5, 1962 Total	0.2107	135	July 31, 1962 Annular	−0.113
140	January 25, 1963 Annular	−0.4898	145	July 20, 1963 Total	0.6571
150	January 14, 1964 Partial	−1.2354	155	July 9, 1964 Partial	1.3623

=== Saros 130 ===
This eclipse is a part of Saros series 130, repeating every 18 years, 11 days, and containing 73 events. The series started with a partial solar eclipse on August 20, 1096. It contains total eclipses from April 5, 1475 through July 18, 2232. There are no annular or hybrid eclipses in this set. The series ends at member 73 as a partial eclipse on October 25, 2394. Its eclipses are tabulated in three columns; every third eclipse in the same column is one exeligmos apart, so they all cast shadows over approximately the same parts of the Earth.

The longest duration of totality was produced by member 30 at 6 minutes, 41 seconds on July 11, 1619. All eclipses in this series occur at the Moon’s descending node of orbit.

Series members 41–62 occur between 1801 and 2200:
41	42	43
November 9, 1817	November 20, 1835	November 30, 1853
44	45	46
December 12, 1871	December 22, 1889	January 3, 1908
47	48	49
January 14, 1926	January 25, 1944	February 5, 1962
50	51	52
February 16, 1980	February 26, 1998	March 9, 2016
53	54	55
March 20, 2034	March 30, 2052	April 11, 2070
56	57	58
April 21, 2088	May 3, 2106	May 14, 2124
59	60	61
May 25, 2142	June 4, 2160	June 16, 2178
62
June 26, 2196

=== Metonic series ===
The metonic series repeats eclipses every 19 years (6939.69 days), lasting about 5 cycles. Eclipses occur in nearly the same calendar date. In addition, the octon subseries repeats 1/5 of that or every 3.8 years (1387.94 days). All eclipses in this table occur at the Moon's descending node.

22 eclipse events between September 12, 1931 and July 1, 2011
September 11–12	June 30–July 1	April 17–19	February 4–5	November 22–23
114	116	118	120	122
September 12, 1931	June 30, 1935	April 19, 1939	February 4, 1943	November 23, 1946
124	126	128	130	132
September 12, 1950	June 30, 1954	April 19, 1958	February 5, 1962	November 23, 1965
134	136	138	140	142
September 11, 1969	June 30, 1973	April 18, 1977	February 4, 1981	November 22, 1984
144	146	148	150	152
September 11, 1988	June 30, 1992	April 17, 1996	February 5, 2000	November 23, 2003
154	156			
September 11, 2007	July 1, 2011			

=== Tritos series ===
This eclipse is a part of a tritos cycle, repeating at alternating nodes every 135 synodic months (≈ 3986.63 days, or 11 years minus 1 month). Their appearance and longitude are irregular due to a lack of synchronization with the anomalistic month (period of perigee), but groupings of 3 tritos cycles (≈ 33 years minus 3 months) come close (≈ 434.044 anomalistic months), so eclipses are similar in these groupings.

Series members between 1801 and 2200
April 14, 1809 (Saros 116)	March 14, 1820 (Saros 117)	February 12, 1831 (Saros 118)	January 11, 1842 (Saros 119)	December 11, 1852 (Saros 120)
November 11, 1863 (Saros 121)	October 10, 1874 (Saros 122)	September 8, 1885 (Saros 123)	August 9, 1896 (Saros 124)	July 10, 1907 (Saros 125)
June 8, 1918 (Saros 126)	May 9, 1929 (Saros 127)	April 7, 1940 (Saros 128)	March 7, 1951 (Saros 129)	February 5, 1962 (Saros 130)
January 4, 1973 (Saros 131)	December 4, 1983 (Saros 132)	November 3, 1994 (Saros 133)	October 3, 2005 (Saros 134)	September 1, 2016 (Saros 135)
August 2, 2027 (Saros 136)	July 2, 2038 (Saros 137)	May 31, 2049 (Saros 138)	April 30, 2060 (Saros 139)	March 31, 2071 (Saros 140)
February 27, 2082 (Saros 141)	January 27, 2093 (Saros 142)	December 29, 2103 (Saros 143)	November 27, 2114 (Saros 144)	October 26, 2125 (Saros 145)
September 26, 2136 (Saros 146)	August 26, 2147 (Saros 147)	July 25, 2158 (Saros 148)	June 25, 2169 (Saros 149)	May 24, 2180 (Saros 150)
April 23, 2191 (Saros 151)

=== Inex series ===
This eclipse is a part of the long period inex cycle, repeating at alternating nodes, every 358 synodic months (≈ 10,571.95 days, or 29 years minus 20 days). Their appearance and longitude are irregular due to a lack of synchronization with the anomalistic month (period of perigee). However, groupings of 3 inex cycles (≈ 87 years minus 2 months) comes close (≈ 1,151.02 anomalistic months), so eclipses are similar in these groupings.

Series members between 1801 and 2200
May 16, 1817 (Saros 125)	April 25, 1846 (Saros 126)	April 6, 1875 (Saros 127)
March 17, 1904 (Saros 128)	February 24, 1933 (Saros 129)	February 5, 1962 (Saros 130)
January 15, 1991 (Saros 131)	December 26, 2019 (Saros 132)	December 5, 2048 (Saros 133)
November 15, 2077 (Saros 134)	October 26, 2106 (Saros 135)	October 7, 2135 (Saros 136)
September 16, 2164 (Saros 137)	August 26, 2193 (Saros 138)	
