= Solar eclipse of February 24, 1933 =

20th-century annular solar eclipse

- Annular eclipse
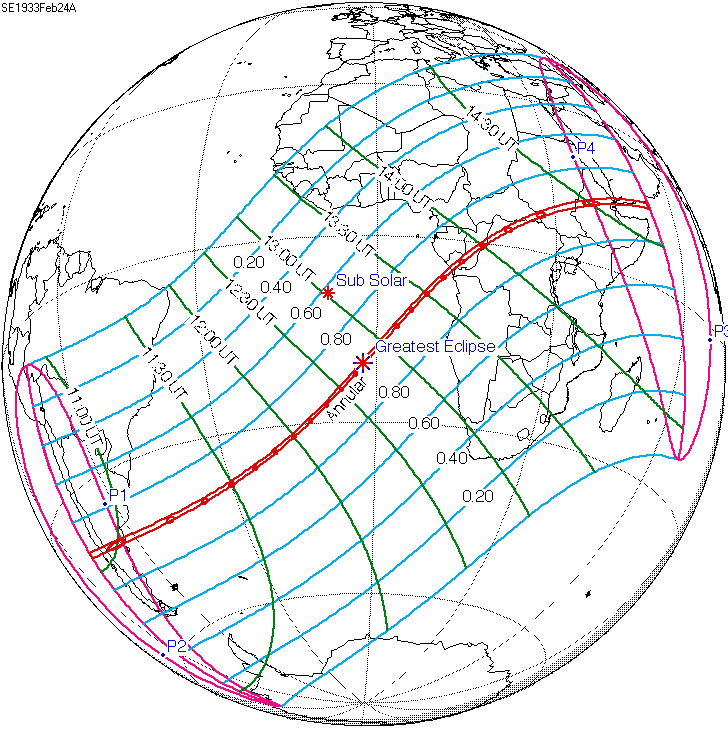
- Map
- Gamma: −0.2191
- Magnitude: 0.9841

Maximum eclipse
- Duration: 92 s (1 min 32 s)
- Coordinates: 20.8°S 2.1°W
- Max. width of band: 58 km (36 mi)

Times (UTC)
- Greatest eclipse: 12:46:39

References
- Saros: 129 (47 of 80)
- Catalog # (SE5000): 9358

An annular solar eclipse occurred at the Moon's ascending node of orbit on Friday, February 24, 1933, with a magnitude of 0.9841. A solar eclipse occurs when the Moon passes between Earth and the Sun, thereby totally or partly obscuring the image of the Sun for a viewer on Earth. An annular solar eclipse occurs when the Moon's apparent diameter is smaller than the Sun's, blocking most of the Sun's light and causing the Sun to look like an annulus (ring). The Moon's apparent diameter was near the average diameter because it occurred 6.1 days after perigee (on February 18, 1933, at 10:50 UTC) and 7.25 days before apogee (on March 3, 1933, at 18:10 UTC).

Annularity was visible from Chile, Argentina, Portuguese Angola (today's Angola), French Equatorial Africa (parts now belonging to R. Congo and Central African Republic), Belgian Congo (today's DR Congo), Anglo-Egyptian Sudan (parts now belonging to South Sudan and Sudan), Ethiopia, French Somaliland (today's Djibouti), southeastern Italian Eritrea (today's Eritrea), and Mutawakkilite Kingdom of Yemen, Aden Protectorate and Aden Province in British Raj (now belonging to Yemen). A partial eclipse was visible for parts of southern and central South America, Antarctica, Africa, and the Middle East.

== Eclipse details ==
Shown below are two tables displaying details about this particular solar eclipse. The first table outlines times at which the Moon's penumbra or umbra attains the specific parameter, and the second table describes various other parameters pertaining to this eclipse.

February 24, 1933 Solar Eclipse Times
| Event | Time (UTC) |
|---|---|
| First Penumbral External Contact | 1933 February 24 at 09:56:13.4 UTC |
| First Umbral External Contact | 1933 February 24 at 10:57:42.3 UTC |
| First Central Line | 1933 February 24 at 10:58:41.9 UTC |
| First Umbral Internal Contact | 1933 February 24 at 10:59:41.6 UTC |
| First Penumbral Internal Contact | 1933 February 24 at 12:04:02.5 UTC |
| Equatorial Conjunction | 1933 February 24 at 12:34:09.6 UTC |
| Ecliptic Conjunction | 1933 February 24 at 12:44:13.6 UTC |
| Greatest Eclipse | 1933 February 24 at 12:46:39.0 UTC |
| Last Penumbral Internal Contact | 1933 February 24 at 13:29:31.9 UTC |
| Last Umbral Internal Contact | 1933 February 24 at 14:33:42.2 UTC |
| Greatest Duration | 1933 February 24 at 14:34:44.6 UTC |
| Last Central Line | 1933 February 24 at 14:34:44.6 UTC |
| Last Umbral External Contact | 1933 February 24 at 14:35:47.1 UTC |
| Last Penumbral External Contact | 1933 February 24 at 15:37:16.0 UTC |

February 24, 1933 Solar Eclipse Parameters
| Parameter | Value |
|---|---|
| Eclipse Magnitude | 0.98411 |
| Eclipse Obscuration | 0.96847 |
| Gamma | −0.21909 |
| Sun Right Ascension | 22h29m09.4s |
| Sun Declination | -09°30'27.0" |
| Sun Semi-Diameter | 16'09.4" |
| Sun Equatorial Horizontal Parallax | 08.9" |
| Moon Right Ascension | 22h29m32.7s |
| Moon Declination | -09°41'36.6" |
| Moon Semi-Diameter | 15'39.2" |
| Moon Equatorial Horizontal Parallax | 0°57'26.7" |
| ΔT | 23.9 s |

== Eclipse season ==
This eclipse is part of an eclipse season, a period, roughly every six months, when eclipses occur. Only two (or occasionally three) eclipse seasons occur each year, and each season lasts about 35 days and repeats just short of six months (173 days) later; thus two full eclipse seasons always occur each year. Either two or three eclipses happen each eclipse season. In the sequence below, each eclipse is separated by a fortnight. The first and last eclipse in this sequence is separated by one synodic month.

Eclipse season of February–March 1933
| February 10 Descending node (full moon) | February 24 Ascending node (new moon) | March 12 Descending node (full moon) |
|---|---|---|
| Penumbral lunar eclipse Lunar Saros 103 | Annular solar eclipse Solar Saros 129 | Penumbral lunar eclipse Lunar Saros 141 |

== Related eclipses ==
=== Eclipses in 1933 ===
- A penumbral lunar eclipse on February 10.
- An annular solar eclipse on February 24.
- A penumbral lunar eclipse on March 12.
- A penumbral lunar eclipse on August 5.
- An annular solar eclipse on August 21.
- A penumbral lunar eclipse on September 4.

=== Metonic ===
- Preceded by: Solar eclipse of May 9, 1929
- Followed by: Solar eclipse of December 13, 1936

=== Tzolkinex ===
- Preceded by: Solar eclipse of January 14, 1926
- Followed by: Solar eclipse of April 7, 1940

=== Half-Saros ===
- Preceded by: Lunar eclipse of February 20, 1924
- Followed by: Lunar eclipse of March 3, 1942

=== Tritos ===
- Preceded by: Solar eclipse of March 28, 1922
- Followed by: Solar eclipse of January 25, 1944

=== Solar Saros 129 ===
- Preceded by: Solar eclipse of February 14, 1915
- Followed by: Solar eclipse of March 7, 1951

=== Inex ===
- Preceded by: Solar eclipse of March 17, 1904
- Followed by: Solar eclipse of February 5, 1962

=== Triad ===
- Preceded by: Solar eclipse of April 25, 1846
- Followed by: Solar eclipse of December 26, 2019

=== Solar eclipses of 1931–1935 ===
This eclipse is a member of a semester series. An eclipse in a semester series of solar eclipses repeats approximately every 177 days and 4 hours (a semester) at alternating nodes of the Moon's orbit.

The partial solar eclipses on April 18, 1931 and October 11, 1931 occur in the previous lunar year eclipse set, and the solar eclipses on January 5, 1935 (partial), June 30, 1935 (partial), and December 25, 1935 (annular) occur in the next lunar year eclipse set.

Solar eclipse series sets from 1931 to 1935
| Descending node | | | Ascending node | | |
| Saros | Map | Gamma | Saros | Map | Gamma |
| 114 | September 12, 1931 Partial | 1.506 | 119 | March 7, 1932 Annular | −0.9673 |
| 124 | August 31, 1932 Total | 0.8307 | 129 | February 24, 1933 Annular | −0.2191 |
| 134 | August 21, 1933 Annular | 0.0869 | 139 | February 14, 1934 Total | 0.4868 |
| 144 | August 10, 1934 Annular | −0.689 | 149 | February 3, 1935 Partial | 1.1438 |
| 154 | July 30, 1935 Partial | −1.4259 | | | |

=== Saros 129 ===
This eclipse is a part of Saros series 129, repeating every 18 years, 11 days, and containing 80 events. The series started with a partial solar eclipse on October 3, 1103. It contains annular eclipses from May 6, 1464 through March 18, 1969; hybrid eclipses from March 29, 1987 through April 20, 2023; and total eclipses from April 30, 2041 through July 26, 2185. The series ends at member 80 as a partial eclipse on February 21, 2528. Its eclipses are tabulated in three columns; every third eclipse in the same column is one exeligmos apart, so they all cast shadows over approximately the same parts of the Earth.

The longest duration of annularity was produced by member 34 at 5 minutes, 10 seconds on October 4, 1698, and the longest duration of totality will be produced by member 58 at 3 minutes, 43 seconds on June 25, 2131. All eclipses in this series occur at the Moon’s ascending node of orbit.

Series members 40–61 occur between 1801 and 2200:
| 40 | 41 | 42 |
|---|---|---|
| December 10, 1806 | December 20, 1824 | December 31, 1842 |
| 43 | 44 | 45 |
| January 11, 1861 | January 22, 1879 | February 1, 1897 |
| 46 | 47 | 48 |
| February 14, 1915 | February 24, 1933 | March 7, 1951 |
| 49 | 50 | 51 |
| March 18, 1969 | March 29, 1987 | April 8, 2005 |
| 52 | 53 | 54 |
| April 20, 2023 | April 30, 2041 | May 11, 2059 |
| 55 | 56 | 57 |
| May 22, 2077 | June 2, 2095 | June 13, 2113 |
| 58 | 59 | 60 |
| June 25, 2131 | July 5, 2149 | July 16, 2167 |
61
July 26, 2185

=== Metonic series ===
The metonic series repeats eclipses every 19 years (6939.69 days), lasting about 5 cycles. Eclipses occur in nearly the same calendar date. In addition, the octon subseries repeats 1/5 of that or every 3.8 years (1387.94 days). All eclipses in this table occur at the Moon's ascending node.

22 eclipse events between December 13, 1898 and July 20, 1982
| December 13–14 | October 1–2 | July 20–21 | May 9 | February 24–25 |
| 111 | 113 | 115 | 117 | 119 |
|---|---|---|---|---|
| December 13, 1898 | | July 21, 1906 | May 9, 1910 | February 25, 1914 |
| 121 | 123 | 125 | 127 | 129 |
| December 14, 1917 | October 1, 1921 | July 20, 1925 | May 9, 1929 | February 24, 1933 |
| 131 | 133 | 135 | 137 | 139 |
| December 13, 1936 | October 1, 1940 | July 20, 1944 | May 9, 1948 | February 25, 1952 |
| 141 | 143 | 145 | 147 | 149 |
| December 14, 1955 | October 2, 1959 | July 20, 1963 | May 9, 1967 | February 25, 1971 |
| 151 | 153 | 155 | | |
| December 13, 1974 | October 2, 1978 | July 20, 1982 | | |

=== Tritos series ===
This eclipse is a part of a tritos cycle, repeating at alternating nodes every 135 synodic months (≈ 3986.63 days, or 11 years minus 1 month). Their appearance and longitude are irregular due to a lack of synchronization with the anomalistic month (period of perigee), but groupings of 3 tritos cycles (≈ 33 years minus 3 months) come close (≈ 434.044 anomalistic months), so eclipses are similar in these groupings.

Series members between 1801 and 2200
| March 4, 1802 (Saros 117) | February 1, 1813 (Saros 118) | January 1, 1824 (Saros 119) | November 30, 1834 (Saros 120) | October 30, 1845 (Saros 121) |
| September 29, 1856 (Saros 122) | August 29, 1867 (Saros 123) | July 29, 1878 (Saros 124) | June 28, 1889 (Saros 125) | May 28, 1900 (Saros 126) |
| April 28, 1911 (Saros 127) | March 28, 1922 (Saros 128) | February 24, 1933 (Saros 129) | January 25, 1944 (Saros 130) | December 25, 1954 (Saros 131) |
| November 23, 1965 (Saros 132) | October 23, 1976 (Saros 133) | September 23, 1987 (Saros 134) | August 22, 1998 (Saros 135) | July 22, 2009 (Saros 136) |
| June 21, 2020 (Saros 137) | May 21, 2031 (Saros 138) | April 20, 2042 (Saros 139) | March 20, 2053 (Saros 140) | February 17, 2064 (Saros 141) |
| January 16, 2075 (Saros 142) | December 16, 2085 (Saros 143) | November 15, 2096 (Saros 144) | October 16, 2107 (Saros 145) | September 15, 2118 (Saros 146) |
| August 15, 2129 (Saros 147) | July 14, 2140 (Saros 148) | June 14, 2151 (Saros 149) | May 14, 2162 (Saros 150) | April 12, 2173 (Saros 151) |
| March 12, 2184 (Saros 152) | February 10, 2195 (Saros 153) | | | |

=== Inex series ===
This eclipse is a part of the long period inex cycle, repeating at alternating nodes, every 358 synodic months (≈ 10,571.95 days, or 29 years minus 20 days). Their appearance and longitude are irregular due to a lack of synchronization with the anomalistic month (period of perigee). However, groupings of 3 inex cycles (≈ 87 years minus 2 months) comes close (≈ 1,151.02 anomalistic months), so eclipses are similar in these groupings.

Series members between 1801 and 2200
| May 16, 1817 (Saros 125) | April 25, 1846 (Saros 126) | April 6, 1875 (Saros 127) |
| March 17, 1904 (Saros 128) | February 24, 1933 (Saros 129) | February 5, 1962 (Saros 130) |
| January 15, 1991 (Saros 131) | December 26, 2019 (Saros 132) | December 5, 2048 (Saros 133) |
| November 15, 2077 (Saros 134) | October 26, 2106 (Saros 135) | October 7, 2135 (Saros 136) |
| September 16, 2164 (Saros 137) | August 26, 2193 (Saros 138) | |
