= August 1933 lunar eclipse =

Penumbral lunar eclipse August 5, 1933

- Penumbral eclipse
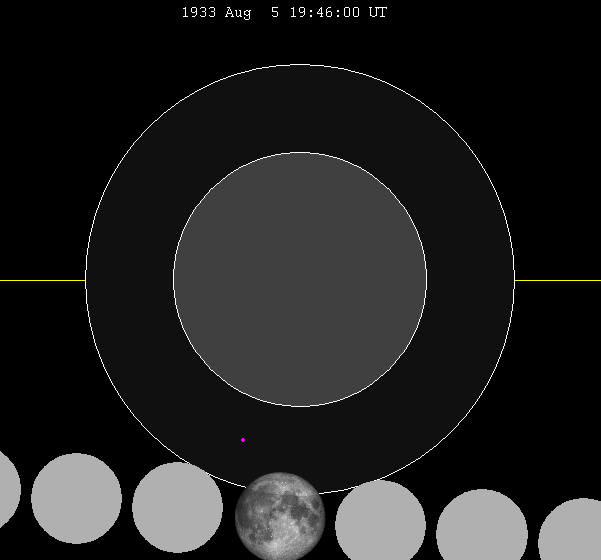
- The Moon's hourly motion shown right to left
- Date: August 5, 1933
- Gamma: −1.4216
- Magnitude: −0.7336
- Saros cycle: 108 (70 of 72)
- Penumbral: 129 minutes, 33 seconds
Contacts (UTC)
- P1: 18:40:48
- Greatest: 19:45:41
- P4: 20:50:21

A penumbral lunar eclipse occurred at the Moon’s ascending node of orbit on Saturday, August 5, 1933, with an umbral magnitude of −0.7336. A lunar eclipse occurs when the Moon moves into the Earth's shadow, causing the Moon to be darkened. A penumbral lunar eclipse occurs when part or all of the Moon's near side passes into the Earth's penumbra. Unlike a solar eclipse, which can only be viewed from a relatively small area of the world, a lunar eclipse may be viewed from anywhere on the night side of Earth. Occurring about 2.1 days after perigee (on August 3, 1933, at 17:40 UTC), the Moon's apparent diameter was larger.

This eclipse was the third of four penumbral lunar eclipses in 1933, with the others occurring on February 10, March 12, and September 4.

== Visibility ==
The eclipse was completely visible over much of Africa, eastern Europe, much of Asia, Australia, and Antarctica, seen rising over western Europe, west Africa, and eastern Brazil and setting over northeast Asia and the western Pacific Ocean.

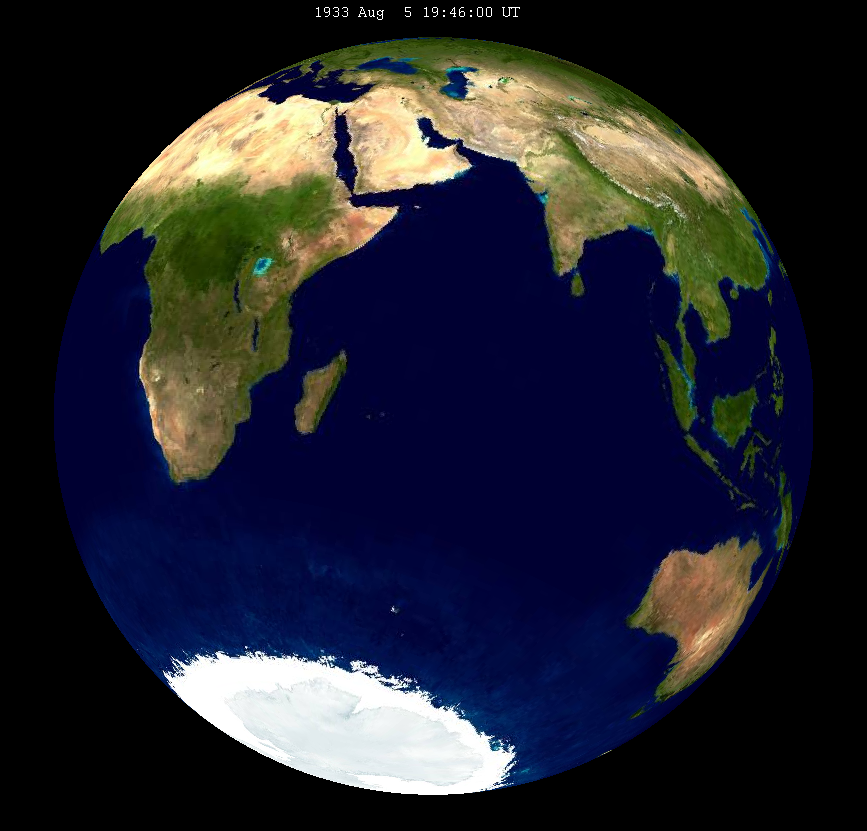
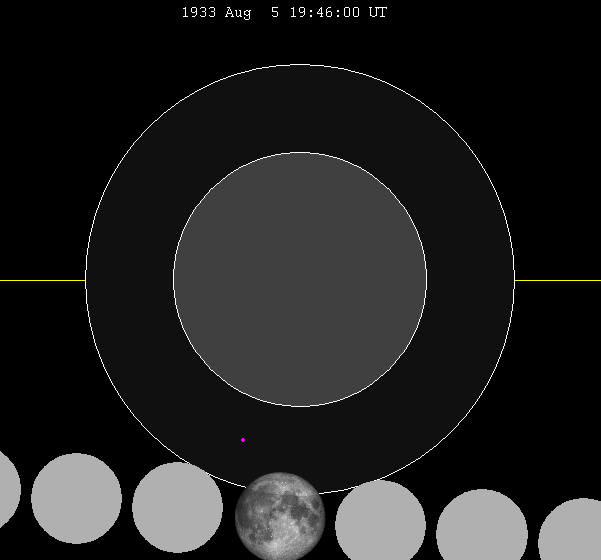

== Eclipse details ==
Shown below is a table displaying details about this particular solar eclipse. It describes various parameters pertaining to this eclipse.

August 5, 1933 Lunar Eclipse Parameters
Parameter	Value
Penumbral Magnitude	0.23237
Umbral Magnitude	−0.73362
Gamma	−1.42163
Sun Right Ascension	09h01m27.7s
Sun Declination	+16°56'57.5"
Sun Semi-Diameter	15'46.2"
Sun Equatorial Horizontal Parallax	08.7"
Moon Right Ascension	21h03m41.4s
Moon Declination	-18°15'57.4"
Moon Semi-Diameter	16'19.5"
Moon Equatorial Horizontal Parallax	0°59'54.8"
ΔT	23.9 s

== Eclipse season ==
This eclipse is part of an eclipse season, a period, roughly every six months, when eclipses occur. Only two (or occasionally three) eclipse seasons occur each year, and each season lasts about 35 days and repeats just short of six months (173 days) later; thus two full eclipse seasons always occur each year. Either two or three eclipses happen each eclipse season. In the sequence below, each eclipse is separated by a fortnight. The first and last eclipse in this sequence is separated by one synodic month.

Eclipse season of August–September 1933
August 5 Ascending node (full moon)	August 21 Descending node (new moon)	September 4 Ascending node (full moon)
Penumbral lunar eclipse Lunar Saros 108	Annular solar eclipse Solar Saros 134	Penumbral lunar eclipse Lunar Saros 146

== Related eclipses ==
=== Eclipses in 1933 ===
- A penumbral lunar eclipse on February 10.
- An annular solar eclipse on February 24.
- A penumbral lunar eclipse on March 12.
- A penumbral lunar eclipse on August 5.
- An annular solar eclipse on August 21.
- A penumbral lunar eclipse on September 4.

=== Metonic ===
- Followed by: Lunar eclipse of May 25, 1937

=== Tzolkinex ===
- Preceded by: Lunar eclipse of June 25, 1926

=== Half-Saros ===
- Preceded by: Solar eclipse of July 31, 1924
- Followed by: Solar eclipse of August 12, 1942

=== Tritos ===
- Followed by: Lunar eclipse of July 6, 1944

=== Lunar Saros 108 ===
- Preceded by: Lunar eclipse of July 26, 1915
- Followed by: Lunar eclipse of August 17, 1951

=== Inex ===
- Followed by: Lunar eclipse of July 17, 1962

=== Triad ===
- Preceded by: Lunar eclipse of October 4, 1846
- Followed by: Lunar eclipse of June 5, 2020

=== Lunar eclipses of 1933–1936 ===
This eclipse is a member of a semester series. An eclipse in a semester series of lunar eclipses repeats approximately every 177 days and 4 hours (a semester) at alternating nodes of the Moon's orbit.

The penumbral lunar eclipses on March 12, 1933 and September 4, 1933 occur in the previous lunar year eclipse set.

Lunar eclipse series sets from 1933 to 1936
Descending node				Ascending node			
Saros	Date Viewing	Type Chart	Gamma	Saros	Date Viewing	Type Chart	Gamma
103	1933 Feb 10	Penumbral	1.5600	108	1933 Aug 05	Penumbral	−1.4216
113	1934 Jan 30	Partial	0.9258	118	1934 Jul 26	Partial	−0.6681
123	1935 Jan 19	Total	0.2498	128	1935 Jul 16	Total	0.0672
133	1936 Jan 08	Total	−0.4429	138	1936 Jul 04	Partial	0.8642
143	1936 Dec 28	Penumbral	−1.0971				

=== Saros 108 ===
This eclipse is a part of Saros series 108, repeating every 18 years, 11 days, and containing 72 events. The series started with a penumbral lunar eclipse on July 8, 689 AD. It contains partial eclipses from February 9, 1050 through May 17, 1212; total eclipses from May 28, 1230 through September 23, 1428; and a second set of partial eclipses from October 5, 1446 through June 1, 1825. The series ends at member 72 as a penumbral eclipse on August 27, 1969.

The longest duration of totality was produced by member 35 at 105 minutes, 57 seconds on July 10, 1302. All eclipses in this series occur at the Moon’s ascending node of orbit.

Greatest	First			
The greatest eclipse of the series occurred on 1302 Jul 10, lasting 105 minutes, 57 seconds.	Penumbral	Partial	Total	Central
The greatest eclipse of the series occurred on 1302 Jul 10, lasting 105 minutes, 57 seconds.	689 Jul 08	1050 Feb 09	1230 May 28	1266 Jun 19
The greatest eclipse of the series occurred on 1302 Jul 10, lasting 105 minutes, 57 seconds.	Last			
The greatest eclipse of the series occurred on 1302 Jul 10, lasting 105 minutes, 57 seconds.	Central	Total	Partial	Penumbral
The greatest eclipse of the series occurred on 1302 Jul 10, lasting 105 minutes, 57 seconds.	1374 Aug 22	1428 Sep 23	1825 Jun 01	1969 Aug 27

Eclipses are tabulated in three columns; every third eclipse in the same column is one exeligmos apart, so they all cast shadows over approximately the same parts of the Earth.

Series members 63–72 occur between 1801 and 1969:
63	64	65
1807 May 21	1825 Jun 01	1843 Jun 12
66	67	68
1861 Jun 22	1879 Jul 03	1897 Jul 14
69	70	71
1915 Jul 26	1933 Aug 05	1951 Aug 17
72
1969 Aug 27

=== Tritos series ===
This eclipse is a part of a tritos cycle, repeating at alternating nodes every 135 synodic months (≈ 3986.63 days, or 11 years minus 1 month). Their appearance and longitude are irregular due to a lack of synchronization with the anomalistic month (period of perigee), but groupings of 3 tritos cycles (≈ 33 years minus 3 months) come close (≈ 434.044 anomalistic months), so eclipses are similar in these groupings.

Series members between 1835 and 2200
1835 May 12 (Saros 99)	1846 Apr 11 (Saros 100)		1868 Feb 08 (Saros 102)	1879 Jan 08 (Saros 103)
				1933 Aug 05 (Saros 108)
1944 Jul 06 (Saros 109)	1955 Jun 05 (Saros 110)	1966 May 04 (Saros 111)	1977 Apr 04 (Saros 112)	1988 Mar 03 (Saros 113)
1999 Jan 31 (Saros 114)	2009 Dec 31 (Saros 115)	2020 Nov 30 (Saros 116)	2031 Oct 30 (Saros 117)	2042 Sep 29 (Saros 118)
2053 Aug 29 (Saros 119)	2064 Jul 28 (Saros 120)	2075 Jun 28 (Saros 121)	2086 May 28 (Saros 122)	2097 Apr 26 (Saros 123)
2108 Mar 27 (Saros 124)	2119 Feb 25 (Saros 125)	2130 Jan 24 (Saros 126)	2140 Dec 23 (Saros 127)	2151 Nov 24 (Saros 128)
2162 Oct 23 (Saros 129)	2173 Sep 21 (Saros 130)	2184 Aug 21 (Saros 131)	2195 Jul 22 (Saros 132)	

=== Inex series ===
This eclipse is a part of the long period inex cycle, repeating at alternating nodes, every 358 synodic months (≈ 10,571.95 days, or 29 years minus 20 days). Their appearance and longitude are irregular due to a lack of synchronization with the anomalistic month (period of perigee). However, groupings of 3 inex cycles (≈ 87 years minus 2 months) comes close (≈ 1,151.02 anomalistic months), so eclipses are similar in these groupings.

Series members between 1846 and 2200
1846 Oct 04 (Saros 105)	1875 Sep 15 (Saros 106)	
1933 Aug 05 (Saros 108)	1962 Jul 17 (Saros 109)	1991 Jun 27 (Saros 110)
2020 Jun 05 (Saros 111)	2049 May 17 (Saros 112)	2078 Apr 27 (Saros 113)
2107 Apr 07 (Saros 114)	2136 Mar 18 (Saros 115)	2165 Feb 26 (Saros 116)
2194 Feb 05 (Saros 117)

=== Half-Saros cycle ===
A lunar eclipse will be preceded and followed by solar eclipses by 9 years and 5.5 days (a half saros). This lunar eclipse is related to two total solar eclipses of Solar Saros 115.

July 31, 1924	August 12, 1942

== See also ==
- List of lunar eclipses
- List of 20th-century lunar eclipses
