= Solar eclipse of March 7, 1951 =

20th-century annular solar eclipse

- Annular eclipse
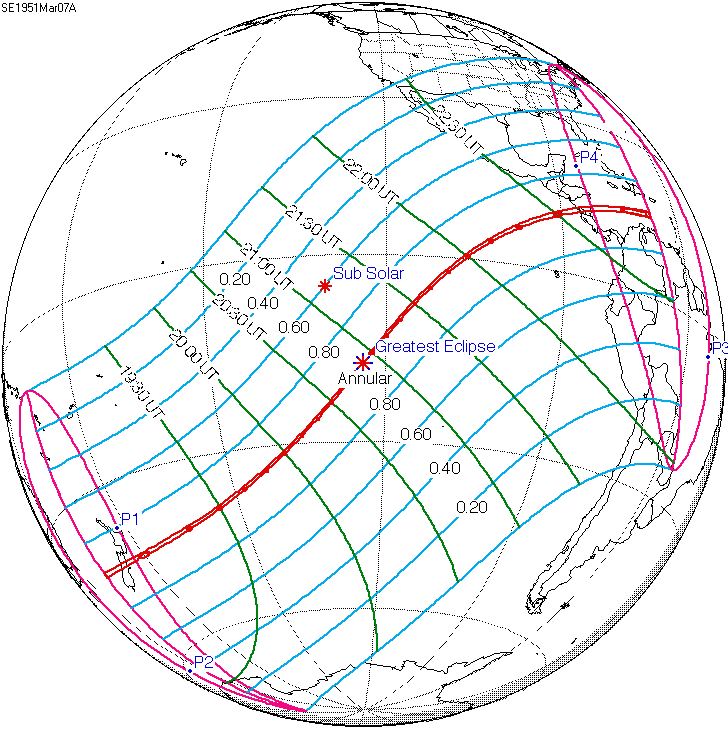
- Map
- Gamma: −0.242
- Magnitude: 0.9896

Maximum eclipse
- Duration: 59 s (0 min 59 s)
- Coordinates: 17.7°S 123.5°W
- Max. width of band: 38 km (24 mi)

Times (UTC)
- Greatest eclipse: 20:53:40

References
- Saros: 129 (48 of 80)
- Catalog # (SE5000): 9400

An annular solar eclipse occurred at the Moon's ascending node of orbit between Wednesday, March 7 and Thursday, March 8, 1951, with a magnitude of 0.9896. A solar eclipse occurs when the Moon passes between Earth and the Sun, thereby totally or partly obscuring the image of the Sun for a viewer on Earth. An annular solar eclipse occurs when the Moon's apparent diameter is smaller than the Sun's, blocking most of the Sun's light and causing the Sun to look like an annulus (ring). An annular eclipse appears as a partial eclipse over a region of the Earth thousands of kilometres wide. The Moon's apparent diameter was near the average diameter because it occurred 5.5 days after perigee (on March 2, 1951, at 7:10 UTC) and 7.4 days before apogee (on March 15, 1951, at 6:20 UTC).

Annularity was visible from New Zealand on March 8 (Thursday), and northern Costa Rica, Nicaragua, and San Andrés Island in Colombia on March 7 (Wednesday). A partial eclipse was visible for parts of Oceania, western South America, southern North America, Central America, and the Caribbean.

== Broadcast ==
This was the first solar eclipse broadcast live on television. American stations such as WCBS-TV, WNET, and NBC News broadcast it live. The path of annularity did not pass the United States of America, and only a partial solar eclipse was visible from the southeastern half of the country. For example, in New York City, a partial solar eclipse occurred right before the sunset, whose gratitude (ratio of diameter covered by the Moon) was only 17%, meaning only 8% of the total disk area was covered at the peak of the eclipse. The curator of the Hayden Planetarium in New York also asked "don’t get people too excited about it" in an interview with The New York Times, but many TV stations still incorporated the solar eclipse into their regular afternoon schedule and also some new TV technology was inaugurated.

== Eclipse details ==
Shown below are two tables displaying details about this particular solar eclipse. The first table outlines times at which the Moon's penumbra or umbra attains the specific parameter, and the second table describes various other parameters pertaining to this eclipse.

March 7, 1951 Solar Eclipse Times
Event	Time (UTC)
First Penumbral External Contact	1951 March 7 at 18:04:26.8 UTC
First Umbral External Contact	1951 March 7 at 19:05:55.2 UTC
First Central Line	1951 March 7 at 19:06:44.2 UTC
First Umbral Internal Contact	1951 March 7 at 19:07:33.2 UTC
First Penumbral Internal Contact	1951 March 7 at 20:12:35.1 UTC
Equatorial Conjunction	1951 March 7 at 20:39:08.0 UTC
Ecliptic Conjunction	1951 March 7 at 20:51:00.5 UTC
Greatest Eclipse	1951 March 7 at 20:53:39.9 UTC
Last Penumbral Internal Contact	1951 March 7 at 21:35:03.7 UTC
Last Umbral Internal Contact	1951 March 7 at 22:39:53.5 UTC
Last Central Line	1951 March 7 at 22:40:45.3 UTC
Greatest Duration	1951 March 7 at 22:40:45.3 UTC
Last Umbral External Contact	1951 March 7 at 22:41:37.2 UTC
Last Penumbral External Contact	1951 March 7 at 23:43:05.1 UTC

March 7, 1951 Solar Eclipse Parameters
Parameter	Value
Eclipse Magnitude	0.98959
Eclipse Obscuration	0.97930
Gamma	−0.24196
Sun Right Ascension	23h10m14.1s
Sun Declination	-05°20'18.6"
Sun Semi-Diameter	16'06.8"
Sun Equatorial Horizontal Parallax	08.9"
Moon Right Ascension	23h10m40.8s
Moon Declination	-05°32'31.4"
Moon Semi-Diameter	15'42.0"
Moon Equatorial Horizontal Parallax	0°57'37.1"
ΔT	29.6 s

== Eclipse season ==
This eclipse is part of an eclipse season, a period, roughly every six months, when eclipses occur. Only two (or occasionally three) eclipse seasons occur each year, and each season lasts about 35 days and repeats just short of six months (173 days) later; thus two full eclipse seasons always occur each year. Either two or three eclipses happen each eclipse season. In the sequence below, each eclipse is separated by a fortnight. The first and last eclipse in this sequence is separated by one synodic month.

Eclipse season of February–March 1951
February 21 Descending node (full moon)	March 7 Ascending node (new moon)	March 23 Descending node (full moon)
Penumbral lunar eclipse Lunar Saros 103	Annular solar eclipse Solar Saros 129	Penumbral lunar eclipse Lunar Saros 141

== Related eclipses ==
=== Eclipses in 1951 ===
- A penumbral lunar eclipse on February 21.
- An annular solar eclipse on March 7.
- A penumbral lunar eclipse on March 23.
- A penumbral lunar eclipse on August 17.
- An annular solar eclipse on September 1.
- A penumbral lunar eclipse on September 15.

=== Metonic ===
- Preceded by: Solar eclipse of May 20, 1947
- Followed by: Solar eclipse of December 25, 1954

=== Tzolkinex ===
- Preceded by: Solar eclipse of January 25, 1944
- Followed by: Solar eclipse of April 19, 1958

=== Half-Saros ===
- Preceded by: Lunar eclipse of March 3, 1942
- Followed by: Lunar eclipse of March 13, 1960

=== Tritos ===
- Preceded by: Solar eclipse of April 7, 1940
- Followed by: Solar eclipse of February 5, 1962

=== Solar Saros 129 ===
- Preceded by: Solar eclipse of February 24, 1933
- Followed by: Solar eclipse of March 18, 1969

=== Inex ===
- Preceded by: Solar eclipse of March 28, 1922
- Followed by: Solar eclipse of February 16, 1980

=== Triad ===
- Preceded by: Solar eclipse of May 6, 1864
- Followed by: Solar eclipse of January 5, 2038

=== Solar eclipses of 1950–1953 ===
This eclipse is a member of a semester series. An eclipse in a semester series of solar eclipses repeats approximately every 177 days and 4 hours (a semester) at alternating nodes of the Moon's orbit.

The partial solar eclipse on July 11, 1953 occurs in the next lunar year eclipse set.

Solar eclipse series sets from 1950 to 1953
Ascending node			Descending node		
Saros	Map	Gamma	Saros	Map	Gamma
119	March 18, 1950 Annular (non-central)	0.9988	124	September 12, 1950 Total	0.8903
129	March 7, 1951 Annular	−0.242	134	September 1, 1951 Annular	0.1557
139	February 25, 1952 Total	0.4697	144	August 20, 1952 Annular	−0.6102
149	February 14, 1953 Partial	1.1331	154	August 9, 1953 Partial	−1.344

=== Saros 129 ===
This eclipse is a part of Saros series 129, repeating every 18 years, 11 days, and containing 80 events. The series started with a partial solar eclipse on October 3, 1103. It contains annular eclipses from May 6, 1464 through March 18, 1969; hybrid eclipses from March 29, 1987 through April 20, 2023; and total eclipses from April 30, 2041 through July 26, 2185. The series ends at member 80 as a partial eclipse on February 21, 2528. Its eclipses are tabulated in three columns; every third eclipse in the same column is one exeligmos apart, so they all cast shadows over approximately the same parts of the Earth.

The longest duration of annularity was produced by member 34 at 5 minutes, 10 seconds on October 4, 1698, and the longest duration of totality will be produced by member 58 at 3 minutes, 43 seconds on June 25, 2131. All eclipses in this series occur at the Moon’s ascending node of orbit.

Series members 40–61 occur between 1801 and 2200:
40	41	42
December 10, 1806	December 20, 1824	December 31, 1842
43	44	45
January 11, 1861	January 22, 1879	February 1, 1897
46	47	48
February 14, 1915	February 24, 1933	March 7, 1951
49	50	51
March 18, 1969	March 29, 1987	April 8, 2005
52	53	54
April 20, 2023	April 30, 2041	May 11, 2059
55	56	57
May 22, 2077	June 2, 2095	June 13, 2113
58	59	60
June 25, 2131	July 5, 2149	July 16, 2167
61
July 26, 2185

=== Metonic series ===
The metonic series repeats eclipses every 19 years (6939.69 days), lasting about 5 cycles. Eclipses occur in nearly the same calendar date. In addition, the octon subseries repeats 1/5 of that or every 3.8 years (1387.94 days). All eclipses in this table occur at the Moon's ascending node.

22 eclipse events between December 24, 1916 and July 31, 2000
December 24–25	October 12	July 31–August 1	May 19–20	March 7
111	113	115	117	119
December 24, 1916		July 31, 1924	May 19, 1928	March 7, 1932
121	123	125	127	129
December 25, 1935	October 12, 1939	August 1, 1943	May 20, 1947	March 7, 1951
131	133	135	137	139
December 25, 1954	October 12, 1958	July 31, 1962	May 20, 1966	March 7, 1970
141	143	145	147	149
December 24, 1973	October 12, 1977	July 31, 1981	May 19, 1985	March 7, 1989
151	153	155		
December 24, 1992	October 12, 1996	July 31, 2000		

=== Tritos series ===
This eclipse is a part of a tritos cycle, repeating at alternating nodes every 135 synodic months (≈ 3986.63 days, or 11 years minus 1 month). Their appearance and longitude are irregular due to a lack of synchronization with the anomalistic month (period of perigee), but groupings of 3 tritos cycles (≈ 33 years minus 3 months) come close (≈ 434.044 anomalistic months), so eclipses are similar in these groupings.

Series members between 1801 and 2200
April 14, 1809 (Saros 116)	March 14, 1820 (Saros 117)	February 12, 1831 (Saros 118)	January 11, 1842 (Saros 119)	December 11, 1852 (Saros 120)
November 11, 1863 (Saros 121)	October 10, 1874 (Saros 122)	September 8, 1885 (Saros 123)	August 9, 1896 (Saros 124)	July 10, 1907 (Saros 125)
June 8, 1918 (Saros 126)	May 9, 1929 (Saros 127)	April 7, 1940 (Saros 128)	March 7, 1951 (Saros 129)	February 5, 1962 (Saros 130)
January 4, 1973 (Saros 131)	December 4, 1983 (Saros 132)	November 3, 1994 (Saros 133)	October 3, 2005 (Saros 134)	September 1, 2016 (Saros 135)
August 2, 2027 (Saros 136)	July 2, 2038 (Saros 137)	May 31, 2049 (Saros 138)	April 30, 2060 (Saros 139)	March 31, 2071 (Saros 140)
February 27, 2082 (Saros 141)	January 27, 2093 (Saros 142)	December 29, 2103 (Saros 143)	November 27, 2114 (Saros 144)	October 26, 2125 (Saros 145)
September 26, 2136 (Saros 146)	August 26, 2147 (Saros 147)	July 25, 2158 (Saros 148)	June 25, 2169 (Saros 149)	May 24, 2180 (Saros 150)
April 23, 2191 (Saros 151)

=== Inex series ===
This eclipse is a part of the long period inex cycle, repeating at alternating nodes, every 358 synodic months (≈ 10,571.95 days, or 29 years minus 20 days). Their appearance and longitude are irregular due to a lack of synchronization with the anomalistic month (period of perigee). However, groupings of 3 inex cycles (≈ 87 years minus 2 months) comes close (≈ 1,151.02 anomalistic months), so eclipses are similar in these groupings.

Series members between 1801 and 2200
June 16, 1806 (Saros 124)	May 27, 1835 (Saros 125)	May 6, 1864 (Saros 126)
April 16, 1893 (Saros 127)	March 28, 1922 (Saros 128)	March 7, 1951 (Saros 129)
February 16, 1980 (Saros 130)	January 26, 2009 (Saros 131)	January 5, 2038 (Saros 132)
December 17, 2066 (Saros 133)	November 27, 2095 (Saros 134)	November 6, 2124 (Saros 135)
October 17, 2153 (Saros 136)	September 27, 2182 (Saros 137)	
