= Solar eclipse of August 21, 1933 =

20th-century annular solar eclipse

- Annular eclipse
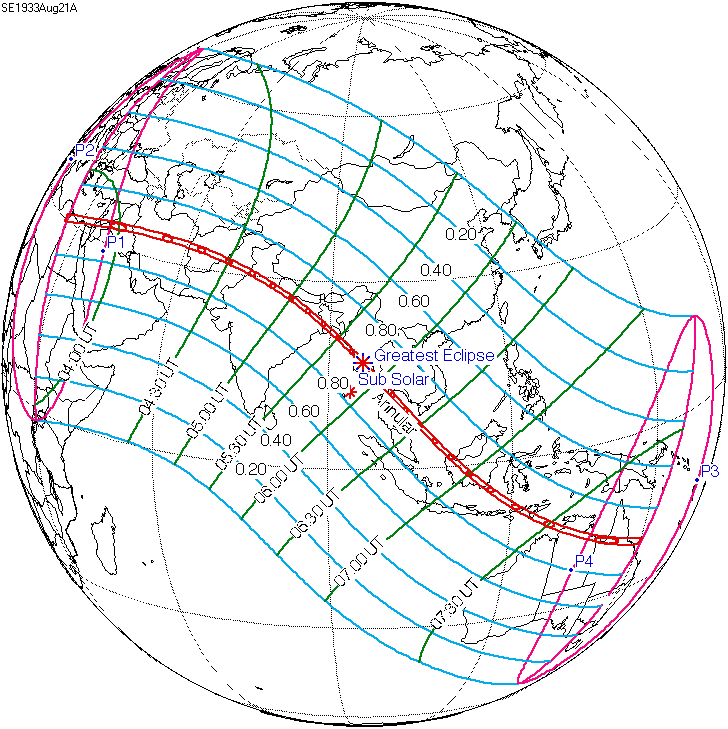
- Map
- Gamma: 0.0869
- Magnitude: 0.9801

Maximum eclipse
- Duration: 124 s (2 min 4 s)
- Coordinates: 16.9°N 95.9°E
- Max. width of band: 71 km (44 mi)

Times (UTC)
- Greatest eclipse: 5:49:11

References
- Saros: 134 (39 of 71)
- Catalog # (SE5000): 9359

An annular solar eclipse occurred at the Moon's descending node of orbit on Monday, August 21, 1933, with a magnitude of 0.9801. A solar eclipse occurs when the Moon passes between Earth and the Sun, thereby totally or partly obscuring the image of the Sun for a viewer on Earth. An annular solar eclipse occurs when the Moon's apparent diameter is smaller than the Sun's, blocking most of the Sun's light and causing the Sun to look like an annulus (ring). An annular eclipse appears as a partial eclipse over a region of the Earth thousands of kilometres wide. Occurring only 5.6 days after apogee (on August 15, 1933, at 15:40 UTC), the Moon's apparent diameter was smaller.

Annularity was visible from a small tip of northeastern Italian Libya (today's Libya), Egypt, Mandatory Palestine (today's Israel, Palestine and Jordan) including Jerusalem and Amman, French Mandate for Syria and the Lebanon (the part now belonging to Syria), Iraq including Baghdad, Persia, Afghanistan, British Raj (the parts now belonging to Pakistan, India, Bangladesh and Myanmar), Siam (name changed to Thailand later), Dutch East Indies (today's Indonesia), Raj of Sarawak (now belonging to Malaysia), and Australia. A partial eclipse was visible for parts of Northeast Africa, Eastern Europe, Asia, and Australia.

== Eclipse details ==
Shown below are two tables displaying details about this particular solar eclipse. The first table outlines times at which the Moon's penumbra or umbra attains the specific parameter, and the second table describes various other parameters pertaining to this eclipse.

August 21, 1933 Solar Eclipse Times
Event	Time (UTC)
First Penumbral External Contact	1933 August 21 at 02:52:30.3 UTC
First Umbral External Contact	1933 August 21 at 03:54:48.4 UTC
First Central Line	1933 August 21 at 03:55:58.9 UTC
Greatest Duration	1933 August 21 at 03:55:58.9 UTC
First Umbral Internal Contact	1933 August 21 at 03:57:09.4 UTC
First Penumbral Internal Contact	1933 August 21 at 04:59:51.0 UTC
Equatorial Conjunction	1933 August 21 at 05:44:23.7 UTC
Ecliptic Conjunction	1933 August 21 at 05:48:11.5 UTC
Greatest Eclipse	1933 August 21 at 05:49:10.9 UTC
Last Penumbral Internal Contact	1933 August 21 at 06:38:38.7 UTC
Last Umbral Internal Contact	1933 August 21 at 07:41:17.5 UTC
Last Central Line	1933 August 21 at 07:42:25.2 UTC
Last Umbral External Contact	1933 August 21 at 07:43:32.9 UTC
Last Penumbral External Contact	1933 August 21 at 08:45:47.4 UTC

August 21, 1933 Solar Eclipse Parameters
Parameter	Value
Eclipse Magnitude	0.98011
Eclipse Obscuration	0.96062
Gamma	0.08688
Sun Right Ascension	09h59m34.9s
Sun Declination	+12°16'29.3"
Sun Semi-Diameter	15'48.7"
Sun Equatorial Horizontal Parallax	08.7"
Moon Right Ascension	09h59m43.6s
Moon Declination	+12°20'51.3"
Moon Semi-Diameter	15'15.5"
Moon Equatorial Horizontal Parallax	0°55'59.9"
ΔT	23.9 s

== Eclipse season ==
This eclipse is part of an eclipse season, a period, roughly every six months, when eclipses occur. Only two (or occasionally three) eclipse seasons occur each year, and each season lasts about 35 days and repeats just short of six months (173 days) later; thus two full eclipse seasons always occur each year. Either two or three eclipses happen each eclipse season. In the sequence below, each eclipse is separated by a fortnight. The first and last eclipse in this sequence is separated by one synodic month.

Eclipse season of August–September 1933
August 5 Ascending node (full moon)	August 21 Descending node (new moon)	September 4 Ascending node (full moon)
Penumbral lunar eclipse Lunar Saros 108	Annular solar eclipse Solar Saros 134	Penumbral lunar eclipse Lunar Saros 146

== Related eclipses ==
=== Eclipses in 1933 ===
- A penumbral lunar eclipse on February 10.
- An annular solar eclipse on February 24.
- A penumbral lunar eclipse on March 12.
- A penumbral lunar eclipse on August 5.
- An annular solar eclipse on August 21.
- A penumbral lunar eclipse on September 4.

=== Metonic ===
- Preceded by: Solar eclipse of November 1, 1929
- Followed by: Solar eclipse of June 8, 1937

=== Tzolkinex ===
- Preceded by: Solar eclipse of July 9, 1926
- Followed by: Solar eclipse of October 1, 1940

=== Half-Saros ===
- Preceded by: Lunar eclipse of August 14, 1924
- Followed by: Lunar eclipse of August 26, 1942

=== Tritos ===
- Preceded by: Solar eclipse of September 21, 1922
- Followed by: Solar eclipse of July 20, 1944

=== Solar Saros 134 ===
- Preceded by: Solar eclipse of August 10, 1915
- Followed by: Solar eclipse of September 1, 1951

=== Inex ===
- Preceded by: Solar eclipse of September 9, 1904
- Followed by: Solar eclipse of July 31, 1962

=== Triad ===
- Preceded by: Solar eclipse of October 20, 1846
- Followed by: Solar eclipse of June 21, 2020

=== Solar eclipses of 1931–1935 ===
This eclipse is a member of a semester series. An eclipse in a semester series of solar eclipses repeats approximately every 177 days and 4 hours (a semester) at alternating nodes of the Moon's orbit.

The partial solar eclipses on April 18, 1931 and October 11, 1931 occur in the previous lunar year eclipse set, and the solar eclipses on January 5, 1935 (partial), June 30, 1935 (partial), and December 25, 1935 (annular) occur in the next lunar year eclipse set.

Solar eclipse series sets from 1931 to 1935
Descending node			Ascending node		
Saros	Map	Gamma	Saros	Map	Gamma
114	September 12, 1931 Partial	1.506	119	March 7, 1932 Annular	−0.9673
124	August 31, 1932 Total	0.8307	129	February 24, 1933 Annular	−0.2191
134	August 21, 1933 Annular	0.0869	139	February 14, 1934 Total	0.4868
144	August 10, 1934 Annular	−0.689	149	February 3, 1935 Partial	1.1438
154	July 30, 1935 Partial	−1.4259			

=== Saros 134 ===
This eclipse is a part of Saros series 134, repeating every 18 years, 11 days, and containing 71 events. The series started with a partial solar eclipse on June 22, 1248. It contains total eclipses from October 9, 1428 through December 24, 1554; hybrid eclipses from January 3, 1573 through June 27, 1843; and annular eclipses from July 8, 1861 through May 21, 2384. The series ends at member 72 as a partial eclipse on August 6, 2510. Its eclipses are tabulated in three columns; every third eclipse in the same column is one exeligmos apart, so they all cast shadows over approximately the same parts of the Earth.

The longest duration of totality was produced by member 11 at 1 minutes, 30 seconds on October 9, 1428, and the longest duration of annularity will be produced by member 52 at 10 minutes, 55 seconds on January 10, 2168. All eclipses in this series occur at the Moon’s descending node of orbit.

Series members 32–53 occur between 1801 and 2200:
32	33	34
June 6, 1807	June 16, 1825	June 27, 1843
35	36	37
July 8, 1861	July 19, 1879	July 29, 1897
38	39	40
August 10, 1915	August 21, 1933	September 1, 1951
41	42	43
September 11, 1969	September 23, 1987	October 3, 2005
44	45	46
October 14, 2023	October 25, 2041	November 5, 2059
47	48	49
November 15, 2077	November 27, 2095	December 8, 2113
50	51	52
December 19, 2131	December 30, 2149	January 10, 2168
53
January 20, 2186

=== Metonic series ===
The metonic series repeats eclipses every 19 years (6939.69 days), lasting about 5 cycles. Eclipses occur in nearly the same calendar date. In addition, the octon subseries repeats 1/5 of that or every 3.8 years (1387.94 days). All eclipses in this table occur at the Moon's descending node.

22 eclipse events between March 27, 1884 and August 20, 1971
March 27–29	January 14	November 1–2	August 20–21	June 8
108	110	112	114	116
March 27, 1884			August 20, 1895	June 8, 1899
118	120	122	124	126
March 29, 1903	January 14, 1907	November 2, 1910	August 21, 1914	June 8, 1918
128	130	132	134	136
March 28, 1922	January 14, 1926	November 1, 1929	August 21, 1933	June 8, 1937
138	140	142	144	146
March 27, 1941	January 14, 1945	November 1, 1948	August 20, 1952	June 8, 1956
148	150	152	154	
March 27, 1960	January 14, 1964	November 2, 1967	August 20, 1971	

=== Tritos series ===
This eclipse is a part of a tritos cycle, repeating at alternating nodes every 135 synodic months (≈ 3986.63 days, or 11 years minus 1 month). Their appearance and longitude are irregular due to a lack of synchronization with the anomalistic month (period of perigee), but groupings of 3 tritos cycles (≈ 33 years minus 3 months) come close (≈ 434.044 anomalistic months), so eclipses are similar in these groupings.

Series members between 1801 and 2200
August 28, 1802 (Saros 122)	July 27, 1813 (Saros 123)	June 26, 1824 (Saros 124)	May 27, 1835 (Saros 125)	April 25, 1846 (Saros 126)
March 25, 1857 (Saros 127)	February 23, 1868 (Saros 128)	January 22, 1879 (Saros 129)	December 22, 1889 (Saros 130)	November 22, 1900 (Saros 131)
October 22, 1911 (Saros 132)	September 21, 1922 (Saros 133)	August 21, 1933 (Saros 134)	July 20, 1944 (Saros 135)	June 20, 1955 (Saros 136)
May 20, 1966 (Saros 137)	April 18, 1977 (Saros 138)	March 18, 1988 (Saros 139)	February 16, 1999 (Saros 140)	January 15, 2010 (Saros 141)
December 14, 2020 (Saros 142)	November 14, 2031 (Saros 143)	October 14, 2042 (Saros 144)	September 12, 2053 (Saros 145)	August 12, 2064 (Saros 146)
July 13, 2075 (Saros 147)	June 11, 2086 (Saros 148)	May 11, 2097 (Saros 149)	April 11, 2108 (Saros 150)	March 11, 2119 (Saros 151)
February 8, 2130 (Saros 152)	January 8, 2141 (Saros 153)	December 8, 2151 (Saros 154)	November 7, 2162 (Saros 155)	October 7, 2173 (Saros 156)
September 4, 2184 (Saros 157)	August 5, 2195 (Saros 158)			

=== Inex series ===
This eclipse is a part of the long period inex cycle, repeating at alternating nodes, every 358 synodic months (≈ 10,571.95 days, or 29 years minus 20 days). Their appearance and longitude are irregular due to a lack of synchronization with the anomalistic month (period of perigee). However, groupings of 3 inex cycles (≈ 87 years minus 2 months) comes close (≈ 1,151.02 anomalistic months), so eclipses are similar in these groupings.

Series members between 1801 and 2200
November 9, 1817 (Saros 130)	October 20, 1846 (Saros 131)	September 29, 1875 (Saros 132)
September 9, 1904 (Saros 133)	August 21, 1933 (Saros 134)	July 31, 1962 (Saros 135)
July 11, 1991 (Saros 136)	June 21, 2020 (Saros 137)	May 31, 2049 (Saros 138)
May 11, 2078 (Saros 139)	April 23, 2107 (Saros 140)	April 1, 2136 (Saros 141)
March 12, 2165 (Saros 142)	February 21, 2194 (Saros 143)	
