= Solar eclipse of September 1, 1951 =

20th-century annular solar eclipse

- Annular eclipse
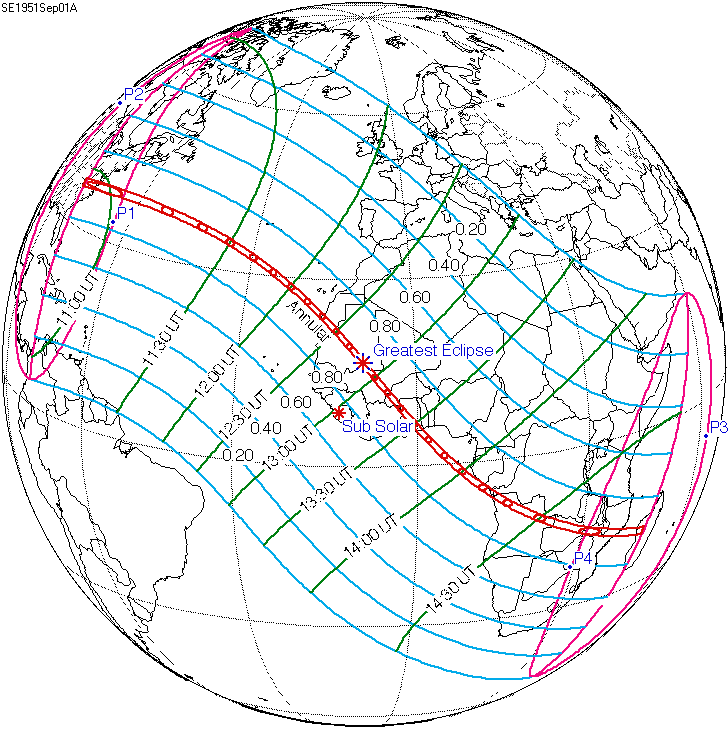
- Map
- Gamma: 0.1557
- Magnitude: 0.9747

Maximum eclipse
- Duration: 156 s (2 min 36 s)
- Coordinates: 16.5°N 8.5°W
- Max. width of band: 91 km (57 mi)

Times (UTC)
- Greatest eclipse: 12:51:51

References
- Saros: 134 (40 of 71)
- Catalog # (SE5000): 9401

An annular solar eclipse occurred at the Moon's descending node of orbit on Saturday, September 1, 1951, with a magnitude of 0.9747. A solar eclipse occurs when the Moon passes between Earth and the Sun, thereby totally or partly obscuring the image of the Sun for a viewer on Earth. An annular solar eclipse occurs when the Moon's apparent diameter is smaller than the Sun's, blocking most of the Sun's light and causing the Sun to look like an annulus (ring). An annular eclipse appears as a partial eclipse over a region of the Earth thousands of kilometres wide. Occurring 5.4 days after apogee (on August 27, 1951, at 3:50 UTC), the Moon's apparent diameter was smaller.

Annularity was visible from Tennessee, North Carolina, and Virginia in the United States, Spanish Sahara (today's West Sahara), French West Africa (the parts now belonging to Mauritania, Mali, Burkina Faso and Ivory Coast), British Gold Coast (today's Ghana), southern tip of French Equatorial Africa (the part now belonging to R. Congo), Belgian Congo (today's DR Congo), Northern Rhodesia (today's Zambia), Portuguese Mozambique (today's Mozambique), Nyasaland (today's Malawi), and French Madagascar (the part now belonging to Madagascar). A partial eclipse was visible for parts of eastern North America, the Caribbean, northern South America, Europe, and Africa.

== Eclipse details ==
Shown below are two tables displaying details about this particular solar eclipse. The first table outlines times at which the Moon's penumbra or umbra attains the specific parameter, and the second table describes various other parameters pertaining to this eclipse.

September 1, 1951 Solar Eclipse Times
Event	Time (UTC)
First Penumbral External Contact	1951 September 1 at 09:54:58.5 UTC
First Umbral External Contact	1951 September 1 at 10:57:51.5 UTC
First Central Line	1951 September 1 at 10:59:13.3 UTC
First Umbral Internal Contact	1951 September 1 at 11:00:35.1 UTC
Greatest Duration	1951 September 1 at 11:26:30.5 UTC
First Penumbral Internal Contact	1951 September 1 at 12:04:50.8 UTC
Equatorial Conjunction	1951 September 1 at 12:42:32.1 UTC
Ecliptic Conjunction	1951 September 1 at 12:50:04.3 UTC
Greatest Eclipse	1951 September 1 at 12:51:51.1 UTC
Last Penumbral Internal Contact	1951 September 1 at 13:39:05.6 UTC
Last Umbral Internal Contact	1951 September 1 at 14:43:15.0 UTC
Last Central Line	1951 September 1 at 14:44:34.0 UTC
Last Umbral External Contact	1951 September 1 at 14:45:53.0 UTC
Last Penumbral External Contact	1951 September 1 at 15:48:41.5 UTC

September 1, 1951 Solar Eclipse Parameters
Parameter	Value
Eclipse Magnitude	0.97473
Eclipse Obscuration	0.95011
Gamma	0.15570
Sun Right Ascension	10h39m41.0s
Sun Declination	+08°28'11.5"
Sun Semi-Diameter	15'50.9"
Sun Equatorial Horizontal Parallax	08.7"
Moon Right Ascension	10h39m57.2s
Moon Declination	+08°35'52.2"
Moon Semi-Diameter	15'12.7"
Moon Equatorial Horizontal Parallax	0°55'49.8"
ΔT	29.8 s

== Eclipse season ==
This eclipse is part of an eclipse season, a period, roughly every six months, when eclipses occur. Only two (or occasionally three) eclipse seasons occur each year, and each season lasts about 35 days and repeats just short of six months (173 days) later; thus two full eclipse seasons always occur each year. Either two or three eclipses happen each eclipse season. In the sequence below, each eclipse is separated by a fortnight. The first and last eclipse in this sequence is separated by one synodic month.

Eclipse season of August–September 1951
August 17 Ascending node (full moon)	September 1 Descending node (new moon)	September 15 Ascending node (full moon)
Penumbral lunar eclipse Lunar Saros 108	Annular solar eclipse Solar Saros 134	Penumbral lunar eclipse Lunar Saros 146

== Related eclipses ==
=== Eclipses in 1951 ===
- A penumbral lunar eclipse on February 21.
- An annular solar eclipse on March 7.
- A penumbral lunar eclipse on March 23.
- A penumbral lunar eclipse on August 17.
- An annular solar eclipse on September 1.
- A penumbral lunar eclipse on September 15.

=== Metonic ===
- Preceded by: Solar eclipse of November 12, 1947
- Followed by: Solar eclipse of June 20, 1955

=== Tzolkinex ===
- Preceded by: Solar eclipse of July 20, 1944
- Followed by: Solar eclipse of October 12, 1958

=== Half-Saros ===
- Preceded by: Lunar eclipse of August 26, 1942
- Followed by: Lunar eclipse of September 5, 1960

=== Tritos ===
- Preceded by: Solar eclipse of October 1, 1940
- Followed by: Solar eclipse of July 31, 1962

=== Solar Saros 134 ===
- Preceded by: Solar eclipse of August 21, 1933
- Followed by: Solar eclipse of September 11, 1969

=== Inex ===
- Preceded by: Solar eclipse of September 21, 1922
- Followed by: Solar eclipse of August 10, 1980

=== Triad ===
- Preceded by: Solar eclipse of October 30, 1864
- Followed by: Solar eclipse of July 2, 2038

=== Solar eclipses of 1950–1953 ===
This eclipse is a member of a semester series. An eclipse in a semester series of solar eclipses repeats approximately every 177 days and 4 hours (a semester) at alternating nodes of the Moon's orbit.

The partial solar eclipse on July 11, 1953 occurs in the next lunar year eclipse set.

Solar eclipse series sets from 1950 to 1953
Ascending node			Descending node		
Saros	Map	Gamma	Saros	Map	Gamma
119	March 18, 1950 Annular (non-central)	0.9988	124	September 12, 1950 Total	0.8903
129	March 7, 1951 Annular	−0.242	134	September 1, 1951 Annular	0.1557
139	February 25, 1952 Total	0.4697	144	August 20, 1952 Annular	−0.6102
149	February 14, 1953 Partial	1.1331	154	August 9, 1953 Partial	−1.344

=== Saros 134 ===
This eclipse is a part of Saros series 134, repeating every 18 years, 11 days, and containing 71 events. The series started with a partial solar eclipse on June 22, 1248. It contains total eclipses from October 9, 1428 through December 24, 1554; hybrid eclipses from January 3, 1573 through June 27, 1843; and annular eclipses from July 8, 1861 through May 21, 2384. The series ends at member 72 as a partial eclipse on August 6, 2510. Its eclipses are tabulated in three columns; every third eclipse in the same column is one exeligmos apart, so they all cast shadows over approximately the same parts of the Earth.

The longest duration of totality was produced by member 11 at 1 minutes, 30 seconds on October 9, 1428, and the longest duration of annularity will be produced by member 52 at 10 minutes, 55 seconds on January 10, 2168. All eclipses in this series occur at the Moon’s descending node of orbit.

Series members 32–53 occur between 1801 and 2200:
32	33	34
June 6, 1807	June 16, 1825	June 27, 1843
35	36	37
July 8, 1861	July 19, 1879	July 29, 1897
38	39	40
August 10, 1915	August 21, 1933	September 1, 1951
41	42	43
September 11, 1969	September 23, 1987	October 3, 2005
44	45	46
October 14, 2023	October 25, 2041	November 5, 2059
47	48	49
November 15, 2077	November 27, 2095	December 8, 2113
50	51	52
December 19, 2131	December 30, 2149	January 10, 2168
53
January 20, 2186

=== Metonic series ===
The metonic series repeats eclipses every 19 years (6939.69 days), lasting about 5 cycles. Eclipses occur in nearly the same calendar date. In addition, the octon subseries repeats 1/5 of that or every 3.8 years (1387.94 days). All eclipses in this table occur at the Moon's descending node.

22 eclipse events between April 8, 1902 and August 31, 1989
April 7–8	January 24–25	November 12	August 31–September 1	June 19–20
108	110	112	114	116
April 8, 1902			August 31, 1913	June 19, 1917
118	120	122	124	126
April 8, 1921	January 24, 1925	November 12, 1928	August 31, 1932	June 19, 1936
128	130	132	134	136
April 7, 1940	January 25, 1944	November 12, 1947	September 1, 1951	June 20, 1955
138	140	142	144	146
April 8, 1959	January 25, 1963	November 12, 1966	August 31, 1970	June 20, 1974
148	150	152	154	
April 7, 1978	January 25, 1982	November 12, 1985	August 31, 1989	

=== Tritos series ===
This eclipse is a part of a tritos cycle, repeating at alternating nodes every 135 synodic months (≈ 3986.63 days, or 11 years minus 1 month). Their appearance and longitude are irregular due to a lack of synchronization with the anomalistic month (period of perigee), but groupings of 3 tritos cycles (≈ 33 years minus 3 months) come close (≈ 434.044 anomalistic months), so eclipses are similar in these groupings.

Series members between 1801 and 2200
October 9, 1809 (Saros 121)	September 7, 1820 (Saros 122)	August 7, 1831 (Saros 123)	July 8, 1842 (Saros 124)	June 6, 1853 (Saros 125)
May 6, 1864 (Saros 126)	April 6, 1875 (Saros 127)	March 5, 1886 (Saros 128)	February 1, 1897 (Saros 129)	January 3, 1908 (Saros 130)
December 3, 1918 (Saros 131)	November 1, 1929 (Saros 132)	October 1, 1940 (Saros 133)	September 1, 1951 (Saros 134)	July 31, 1962 (Saros 135)
June 30, 1973 (Saros 136)	May 30, 1984 (Saros 137)	April 29, 1995 (Saros 138)	March 29, 2006 (Saros 139)	February 26, 2017 (Saros 140)
January 26, 2028 (Saros 141)	December 26, 2038 (Saros 142)	November 25, 2049 (Saros 143)	October 24, 2060 (Saros 144)	September 23, 2071 (Saros 145)
August 24, 2082 (Saros 146)	July 23, 2093 (Saros 147)	June 22, 2104 (Saros 148)	May 24, 2115 (Saros 149)	April 22, 2126 (Saros 150)
March 21, 2137 (Saros 151)	February 19, 2148 (Saros 152)	January 19, 2159 (Saros 153)	December 18, 2169 (Saros 154)	November 17, 2180 (Saros 155)
October 18, 2191 (Saros 156)

=== Inex series ===
This eclipse is a part of the long period inex cycle, repeating at alternating nodes, every 358 synodic months (≈ 10,571.95 days, or 29 years minus 20 days). Their appearance and longitude are irregular due to a lack of synchronization with the anomalistic month (period of perigee). However, groupings of 3 inex cycles (≈ 87 years minus 2 months) comes close (≈ 1,151.02 anomalistic months), so eclipses are similar in these groupings.

Series members between 1801 and 2200
December 10, 1806 (Saros 129)	November 20, 1835 (Saros 130)	October 30, 1864 (Saros 131)
October 9, 1893 (Saros 132)	September 21, 1922 (Saros 133)	September 1, 1951 (Saros 134)
August 10, 1980 (Saros 135)	July 22, 2009 (Saros 136)	July 2, 2038 (Saros 137)
June 11, 2067 (Saros 138)	May 22, 2096 (Saros 139)	May 3, 2125 (Saros 140)
April 12, 2154 (Saros 141)	March 23, 2183 (Saros 142)	
