= Solar eclipse of November 23, 1965 =

20th-century annular solar eclipse

- Annular eclipse
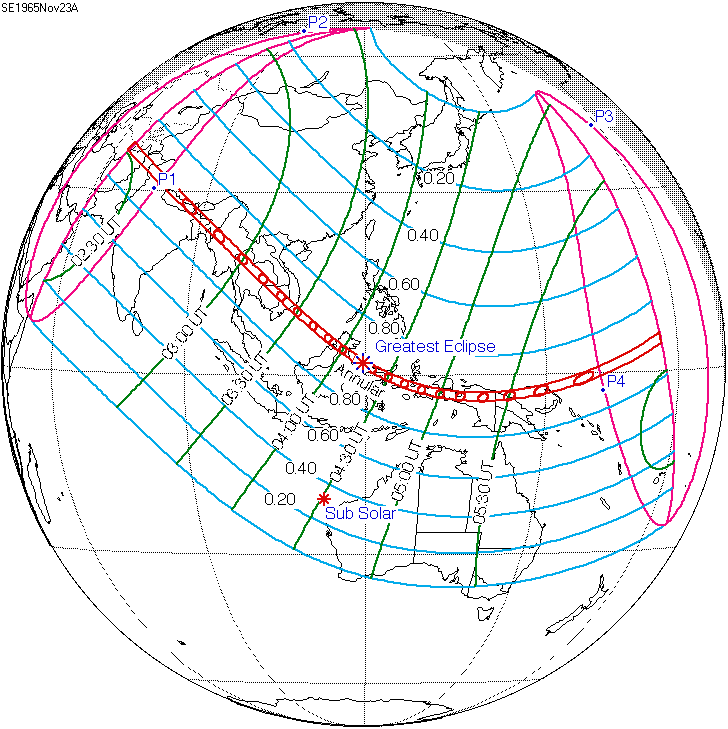
- Map
- Gamma: 0.3906
- Magnitude: 0.9656

Maximum eclipse
- Duration: 242 s (4 min 2 s)
- Coordinates: 1.7°N 119.8°E
- Max. width of band: 134 km (83 mi)

Times (UTC)
- Greatest eclipse: 4:14:51

References
- Saros: 132 (43 of 71)
- Catalog # (SE5000): 9433

An annular solar eclipse occurred at the Moon's descending node of orbit on Tuesday, November 23, 1965, with a magnitude of 0.9656. A solar eclipse occurs when the Moon passes between Earth and the Sun, thereby totally or partly obscuring the image of the Sun for a viewer on Earth. An annular solar eclipse occurs when the Moon's apparent diameter is smaller than the Sun's, blocking most of the Sun's light and causing the Sun to look like an annulus (ring). An annular eclipse appears as a partial eclipse over a region of the Earth thousands of kilometres wide. Occurring about 6.3 days before apogee (on November 29, 1965, at 12:00 UTC), the Moon's apparent diameter was smaller.

Annularity was visible from the Soviet Union (today's eastern Turkmenistan, southern Uzbekistan and southwestern Tajikistan), Afghanistan, West Pakistan, India, China, Nepal (including the capital city Kathmandu), southwestern Sikkim (now merged with India), East Pakistan (today's Bangladesh), Union of Burma (today's Myanmar), southwestern tip of Sainyabuli Province in Laos, Cambodia, South Vietnam (now belonging to Vietnam), Spratly Islands, Brunei, Malaysia, Indonesia, the Territory of Papua New Guinea (today's Papua New Guinea), and Gilbert and Ellice Islands (the part now belonging to Kiribati). 8 of the 14 eight-thousanders—Dhaulagiri, Annapurna, Manaslu, Shishapangma, Cho Oyu, Everest, Lhotse and Makalu, as well as the highest peak of Oceania, Puncak Jaya, lie in the path of annularity. A partial eclipse was visible for most of Asia, Australia, and Oceania.

== Observation ==
An observation team of the Lockheed Corporation and the United States Air Force observed the annular eclipse near Chiang Mai, Thailand's second largest city. They calculated the relationship between the angular diameters of the Moon and the Sun during annularity, and the flattening of the Moon based on the results.

== Eclipse details ==
Shown below are two tables displaying details about this particular solar eclipse. The first table outlines times at which the Moon's penumbra or umbra attains the specific parameter, and the second table describes various other parameters pertaining to this eclipse.

November 23, 1965 Solar Eclipse Times
Event	Time (UTC)
First Penumbral External Contact	1965 November 23 at 01:24:37.4 UTC
First Umbral External Contact	1965 November 23 at 02:29:29.3 UTC
First Central Line	1965 November 23 at 02:31:10.9 UTC
First Umbral Internal Contact	1965 November 23 at 02:32:52.8 UTC
First Penumbral Internal Contact	1965 November 23 at 03:52:46.9 UTC
Equatorial Conjunction	1965 November 23 at 04:00:47.7 UTC
Ecliptic Conjunction	1965 November 23 at 04:10:27.3 UTC
Greatest Eclipse	1965 November 23 at 04:14:51.0 UTC
Last Penumbral Internal Contact	1965 November 23 at 04:37:14.5 UTC
Greatest Duration	1965 November 23 at 04:40:27.4 UTC
Last Umbral Internal Contact	1965 November 23 at 05:56:56.0 UTC
Last Central Line	1965 November 23 at 05:58:40.8 UTC
Last Umbral External Contact	1965 November 23 at 06:00:25.4 UTC
Last Penumbral External Contact	1965 November 23 at 07:05:17.0 UTC

November 23, 1965 Solar Eclipse Parameters
Parameter	Value
Eclipse Magnitude	0.96561
Eclipse Obscuration	0.93240
Gamma	0.39061
Sun Right Ascension	15h54m02.2s
Sun Declination	-20°17'39.6"
Sun Semi-Diameter	16'11.9"
Sun Equatorial Horizontal Parallax	08.9"
Moon Right Ascension	15h54m30.7s
Moon Declination	-19°56'39.6"
Moon Semi-Diameter	15'24.9"
Moon Equatorial Horizontal Parallax	0°56'34.5"
ΔT	36.5 s

== Eclipse season ==
This eclipse is part of an eclipse season, a period, roughly every six months, when eclipses occur. Only two (or occasionally three) eclipse seasons occur each year, and each season lasts about 35 days and repeats just short of six months (173 days) later; thus two full eclipse seasons always occur each year. Either two or three eclipses happen each eclipse season. In the sequence below, each eclipse is separated by a fortnight.

Eclipse season of November–December 1965
November 23 Descending node (new moon)	December 8 Ascending node (full moon)
Annular solar eclipse Solar Saros 132	Penumbral lunar eclipse Lunar Saros 144

== Related eclipses ==
=== Eclipses in 1965 ===
- A total solar eclipse on May 30.
- A partial lunar eclipse on June 14.
- An annular solar eclipse on November 23.
- A penumbral lunar eclipse on December 8.

=== Metonic ===
- Preceded by: Solar eclipse of February 5, 1962
- Followed by: Solar eclipse of September 11, 1969

=== Tzolkinex ===
- Preceded by: Solar eclipse of October 12, 1958
- Followed by: Solar eclipse of January 4, 1973

=== Half-Saros ===
- Preceded by: Lunar eclipse of November 18, 1956
- Followed by: Lunar eclipse of November 29, 1974

=== Tritos ===
- Preceded by: Solar eclipse of December 25, 1954
- Followed by: Solar eclipse of October 23, 1976

=== Solar Saros 132 ===
- Preceded by: Solar eclipse of November 12, 1947
- Followed by: Solar eclipse of December 4, 1983

=== Inex ===
- Preceded by: Solar eclipse of December 13, 1936
- Followed by: Solar eclipse of November 3, 1994

=== Triad ===
- Preceded by: Solar eclipse of January 22, 1879
- Followed by: Solar eclipse of September 22, 2052

=== Solar eclipses of 1964–1967 ===
This eclipse is a member of a semester series. An eclipse in a semester series of solar eclipses repeats approximately every 177 days and 4 hours (a semester) at alternating nodes of the Moon's orbit.

The partial solar eclipses on January 14, 1964 and July 9, 1964 occur in the previous lunar year eclipse set.

Solar eclipse series sets from 1964 to 1967
Ascending node			Descending node		
Saros	Map	Gamma	Saros	Map	Gamma
117	June 10, 1964 Partial	−1.1393	122	December 4, 1964 Partial	1.1193
127	May 30, 1965 Total	−0.4225	132	November 23, 1965 Annular	0.3906
137	May 20, 1966 Annular	0.3467	142	November 12, 1966 Total	−0.33
147	May 9, 1967 Partial	1.1422	152	November 2, 1967 Total (non-central)	1.0007

=== Saros 132 ===
This eclipse is a part of Saros series 132, repeating every 18 years, 11 days, and containing 71 events. The series started with a partial solar eclipse on August 13, 1208. It contains annular eclipses from March 17, 1569 through March 12, 2146; hybrid eclipses on March 23, 2164 and April 3, 2182; and total eclipses from April 14, 2200 through June 19, 2308. The series ends at member 71 as a partial eclipse on September 25, 2470. Its eclipses are tabulated in three columns; every third eclipse in the same column is one exeligmos apart, so they all cast shadows over approximately the same parts of the Earth.

The longest duration of annularity was produced by member 25 at 6 minutes, 56 seconds on May 9, 1641, and the longest duration of totality will be produced by member 61 at 2 minutes, 14 seconds on June 8, 2290. All eclipses in this series occur at the Moon’s descending node of orbit.

Series members 34–56 occur between 1801 and 2200:
34	35	36
August 17, 1803	August 27, 1821	September 7, 1839
37	38	39
September 18, 1857	September 29, 1875	October 9, 1893
40	41	42
October 22, 1911	November 1, 1929	November 12, 1947
43	44	45
November 23, 1965	December 4, 1983	December 14, 2001
46	47	48
December 26, 2019	January 5, 2038	January 16, 2056
49	50	51
January 27, 2074	February 7, 2092	February 18, 2110
52	53	54
March 1, 2128	March 12, 2146	March 23, 2164
55	56	
April 3, 2182	April 14, 2200	

=== Metonic series ===
The metonic series repeats eclipses every 19 years (6939.69 days), lasting about 5 cycles. Eclipses occur in nearly the same calendar date. In addition, the octon subseries repeats 1/5 of that or every 3.8 years (1387.94 days). All eclipses in this table occur at the Moon's descending node.

22 eclipse events between September 12, 1931 and July 1, 2011
September 11–12	June 30–July 1	April 17–19	February 4–5	November 22–23
114	116	118	120	122
September 12, 1931	June 30, 1935	April 19, 1939	February 4, 1943	November 23, 1946
124	126	128	130	132
September 12, 1950	June 30, 1954	April 19, 1958	February 5, 1962	November 23, 1965
134	136	138	140	142
September 11, 1969	June 30, 1973	April 18, 1977	February 4, 1981	November 22, 1984
144	146	148	150	152
September 11, 1988	June 30, 1992	April 17, 1996	February 5, 2000	November 23, 2003
154	156			
September 11, 2007	July 1, 2011			

=== Tritos series ===
This eclipse is a part of a tritos cycle, repeating at alternating nodes every 135 synodic months (≈ 3986.63 days, or 11 years minus 1 month). Their appearance and longitude are irregular due to a lack of synchronization with the anomalistic month (period of perigee), but groupings of 3 tritos cycles (≈ 33 years minus 3 months) come close (≈ 434.044 anomalistic months), so eclipses are similar in these groupings.

Series members between 1801 and 2200
March 4, 1802 (Saros 117)	February 1, 1813 (Saros 118)	January 1, 1824 (Saros 119)	November 30, 1834 (Saros 120)	October 30, 1845 (Saros 121)
September 29, 1856 (Saros 122)	August 29, 1867 (Saros 123)	July 29, 1878 (Saros 124)	June 28, 1889 (Saros 125)	May 28, 1900 (Saros 126)
April 28, 1911 (Saros 127)	March 28, 1922 (Saros 128)	February 24, 1933 (Saros 129)	January 25, 1944 (Saros 130)	December 25, 1954 (Saros 131)
November 23, 1965 (Saros 132)	October 23, 1976 (Saros 133)	September 23, 1987 (Saros 134)	August 22, 1998 (Saros 135)	July 22, 2009 (Saros 136)
June 21, 2020 (Saros 137)	May 21, 2031 (Saros 138)	April 20, 2042 (Saros 139)	March 20, 2053 (Saros 140)	February 17, 2064 (Saros 141)
January 16, 2075 (Saros 142)	December 16, 2085 (Saros 143)	November 15, 2096 (Saros 144)	October 16, 2107 (Saros 145)	September 15, 2118 (Saros 146)
August 15, 2129 (Saros 147)	July 14, 2140 (Saros 148)	June 14, 2151 (Saros 149)	May 14, 2162 (Saros 150)	April 12, 2173 (Saros 151)
March 12, 2184 (Saros 152)	February 10, 2195 (Saros 153)			

=== Inex series ===
This eclipse is a part of the long period inex cycle, repeating at alternating nodes, every 358 synodic months (≈ 10,571.95 days, or 29 years minus 20 days). Their appearance and longitude are irregular due to a lack of synchronization with the anomalistic month (period of perigee). However, groupings of 3 inex cycles (≈ 87 years minus 2 months) comes close (≈ 1,151.02 anomalistic months), so eclipses are similar in these groupings.

Series members between 1801 and 2200
March 4, 1821 (Saros 127)	February 12, 1850 (Saros 128)	January 22, 1879 (Saros 129)
January 3, 1908 (Saros 130)	December 13, 1936 (Saros 131)	November 23, 1965 (Saros 132)
November 3, 1994 (Saros 133)	October 14, 2023 (Saros 134)	September 22, 2052 (Saros 135)
September 3, 2081 (Saros 136)	August 15, 2110 (Saros 137)	July 25, 2139 (Saros 138)
July 5, 2168 (Saros 139)	June 15, 2197 (Saros 140)	
