= Solar eclipse of January 14, 1926 =

Total eclipse

- Total eclipse
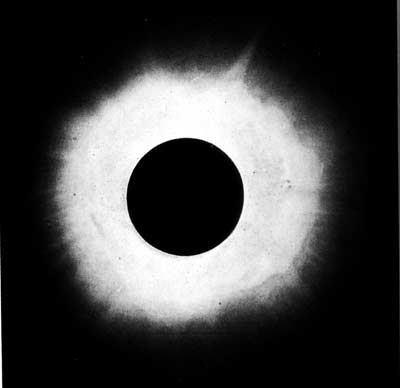
- A photo of the eclipse, taken from Sumatra by John A. Miller of the Swarthmore expedition

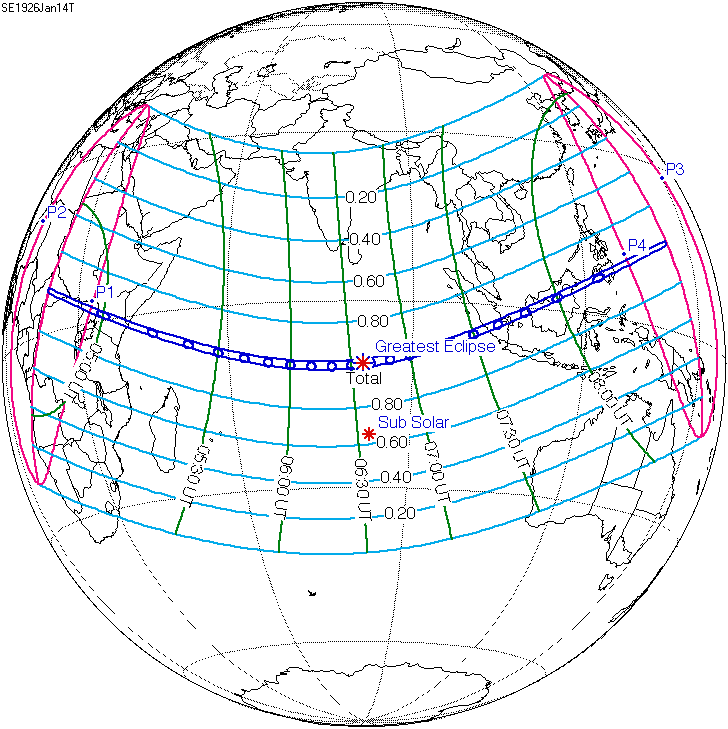
- Map
- Gamma: 0.1973
- Magnitude: 1.043

Maximum eclipse
- Duration: 251 s (4 min 11 s)
- Coordinates: 10.1°S 82.3°E
- Max. width of band: 147 km (91 mi)

Times (UTC)
- Greatest eclipse: 6:36:58

References
- Saros: 130 (47 of 73)
- Catalog # (SE5000): 9341

A total solar eclipse occurred at the Moon's descending node of orbit on Thursday, January 14, 1926, with a magnitude of 1.043. A solar eclipse occurs when the Moon passes between Earth and the Sun, thereby totally or partly obscuring the Sun for a viewer on Earth. A total solar eclipse occurs when the Moon's apparent diameter is larger than the Sun's, blocking all direct sunlight, turning day into darkness. Totality occurs in a narrow path across Earth's surface, with the partial solar eclipse visible over a surrounding region thousands of kilometres wide. Occurring about 17 hours after perigee (on January 14, 1926, at 23:30 UTC), the Moon's apparent diameter was larger.

Totality was visible from French Equatorial Africa (the part now belonging to Central African Republic), northeastern Belgian Congo (today's DR Congo), southwestern tip of Anglo-Egyptian Sudan (the part now belonging to South Sudan), British Uganda (today's Uganda), British Kenya (today's Kenya), southern tip of Italian Somaliland (today's Somalia), British Seychelles (today's Seychelles), Dutch East Indies (today's Indonesia), Raj of Sarawak (now belonging to Malaysia), North Borneo (now belonging to Malaysia), and Philippines. A partial eclipse was visible for parts of East Africa, the Middle East, South Asia, Southeast Asia, East Asia, and Australia.

== Observations ==
The event was observed by astronomers, of which several groups gathered in Sumatra, to watch the eclipse. One was from Germany, one was from the Netherlands, and three were from the United States (the Naval Observatory, Sproul Observatory, and the Bureau of Standards). A Reuters correspondent gave the total number of astronomers on Sumatra as 50.

The Dutch expedition, in Palambang, was unable to observe the first phase of the eclipse (due to cloud coverage); the leader of a British expedition in Bencoolen reported that he had "carried out his full program". The Naval Observatory was specifically cited as being set up in Tebing Tinggi, in the southeast of Sumatra. One objective of the observations was to evaluate Albert Einstein's theory of general relativity; cloudy conditions made this difficult. John Miller, head of an expedition from Swarthmore College set up in Bencoolen, is quoted by the Philadelphia Inquirer:

That theory, which was advanced a few years ago to support Newton's law of gravitation, has proved difficult to astronomers, since important data bearing upon it can only be gathered during periods of total eclipse of the Sun. The eclipse in January of last year, which was visible in sections of New England, was also a failure in that respect, since atmospheric conditions were not satisfactory for applying the Einstein theory to the test. Special photographic equipment for gathering data on the theory was taken to Sumatra by the Swarthmore scientists, and four playtes wer made during the eclipse, Dr. Miller cabled.

[...]

"No authentic statement can be made until after the plates have been developed, but we believe that the ten plates exposed in the great 62-foot camera are not seriously affected; the ones in the shorter cameras may be, but it is not likely. We are apprehensive that the four plates exposed in the fifteen-foot twin-camera for the Einstein effect are damaged. The stars surrounding the sun were rather faint and we fear the thin clouds may have blotted the faint stars out. If this is so the Einstein experiment will have failed."

The Swarthmore team had arrived in November 1925, and taken two months to set up the equipment for the observation. Apart from the relativity experiments, other photographs were taken to better understand the composition of the Sun's corona: "Because of the immense distances from the sun's surface which the corona attains, it has been assumed by astronomers that the corona was not composed of gases as are the 'prominences,' seen nearer the surface. What the composition of the corona may be has not been discovered." While the experiments in Sumatra observed the event nearly unobstructed, others in Manila failed completely, on account of cloudy weather. Australian reports from Melbourne confirmed it was visible there.

The Royal Netherlands Academy of Arts and Sciences established a committee in the spring of 1924 and began meeting on April 5, 1924 to discuss observing this eclipse. In the end, the team chose 15 kilometres northwest of Palembang on the island of Sumatra in the Dutch East Indies, while observation teams from other organizations also went to the city of Bengkulu, located in the west of the island, where the weather condition was predicted slightly better and the totality lasted slightly longer. On November 10, 1925, the team boarded a ship from Marseille, France, transited through Singapore, and arrived in Palembang on December 4. During the approximately 6 weeks of stay in Palembang, the weather was changeable, which surprised the team even though they had learned about the local weather information in advance. On the day of the eclipse, there were light clouds in the sky in the morning. Shortly before noon, the clouds covered the western sky and showers fell half an hour before the 1st contact. The weather improved slightly afterwards, but soon cumulus clouds covered the sun again. Although the sun was visible through the clouds with the naked eye during totality, photographing the solar corona and the spectral observations all failed. On January 16, the team sailed to Batavia, capital of the Dutch East Indies (now Jakarta, capital of Indonesia). Most members stayed in Java Island and Deli (now Medan) in eastern Sumatra for a few days before returning in the Netherlands on February 14. One member observed the southern Milky Way at the Bosscha Observatory in western Java and stayed until May 19.

In Jubaland an Italian expedition was outfitted to observe the Eclipse as well, led by Guido Horn d'Arturo.

== In popular culture ==
The eclipse plays a central role in the Call of Cthulhu campaign 'Masks of Nyarlathotep'.

== Eclipse details ==
Shown below are two tables displaying details about this particular solar eclipse. The first table outlines times at which the Moon's penumbra or umbra attains the specific parameter, and the second table describes various other parameters pertaining to this eclipse.

January 14, 1926 Solar Eclipse Times
| Event | Time (UTC) |
|---|---|
| First Penumbral External Contact | 1926 January 14 at 03:59:05.5 UTC |
| First Umbral External Contact | 1926 January 14 at 04:54:54.7 UTC |
| First Central Line | 1926 January 14 at 04:55:36.5 UTC |
| First Umbral Internal Contact | 1926 January 14 at 04:56:18.3 UTC |
| First Penumbral Internal Contact | 1926 January 14 at 05:53:59.2 UTC |
| Ecliptic Conjunction | 1926 January 14 at 06:34:55.9 UTC |
| Greatest Duration | 1926 January 14 at 06:36:14.0 UTC |
| Greatest Eclipse | 1926 January 14 at 06:36:57.7 UTC |
| Equatorial Conjunction | 1926 January 14 at 06:38:24.8 UTC |
| Last Penumbral Internal Contact | 1926 January 14 at 07:19:54.3 UTC |
| Last Umbral Internal Contact | 1926 January 14 at 08:17:34.9 UTC |
| Last Central Line | 1926 January 14 at 08:18:17.6 UTC |
| Last Umbral External Contact | 1926 January 14 at 08:19:00.3 UTC |
| Last Penumbral External Contact | 1926 January 14 at 09:14:47.1 UTC |

January 14, 1926 Solar Eclipse Parameters
| Parameter | Value |
|---|---|
| Eclipse Magnitude | 1.04305 |
| Eclipse Obscuration | 1.08795 |
| Gamma | 0.19725 |
| Sun Right Ascension | 19h40m49.1s |
| Sun Declination | -21°25'36.6" |
| Sun Semi-Diameter | 16'15.6" |
| Sun Equatorial Horizontal Parallax | 08.9" |
| Moon Right Ascension | 19h40m45.4s |
| Moon Declination | -21°13'35.8" |
| Moon Semi-Diameter | 16'40.7" |
| Moon Equatorial Horizontal Parallax | 1°01'12.6" |
| ΔT | 23.9 s |

== Eclipse season ==
This eclipse is part of an eclipse season, a period, roughly every six months, when eclipses occur. Only two (or occasionally three) eclipse seasons occur each year, and each season lasts about 35 days and repeats just short of six months (173 days) later; thus two full eclipse seasons always occur each year. Either two or three eclipses happen each eclipse season. In the sequence below, each eclipse is separated by a fortnight.

Eclipse season of January 1926
| January 14 Descending node (new moon) | January 28 Ascending node (full moon) |
|---|---|
| Total solar eclipse Solar Saros 130 | Penumbral lunar eclipse Lunar Saros 142 |

== Related eclipses ==
=== Eclipses in 1926 ===
- A total solar eclipse on January 14.
- A penumbral lunar eclipse on January 28.
- A penumbral lunar eclipse on June 25.
- An annular solar eclipse on July 9.
- A penumbral lunar eclipse on July 25.
- A penumbral lunar eclipse on December 19.

=== Metonic ===
- Preceded by: Solar eclipse of March 28, 1922
- Followed by: Solar eclipse of November 1, 1929

=== Tzolkinex ===
- Preceded by: Solar eclipse of December 3, 1918
- Followed by: Solar eclipse of February 24, 1933

=== Half-Saros ===
- Preceded by: Lunar eclipse of January 8, 1917
- Followed by: Lunar eclipse of January 19, 1935

=== Tritos ===
- Preceded by: Solar eclipse of February 14, 1915
- Followed by: Solar eclipse of December 13, 1936

=== Solar Saros 130 ===
- Preceded by: Solar eclipse of January 3, 1908
- Followed by: Solar eclipse of January 25, 1944

=== Inex ===
- Preceded by: Solar eclipse of February 1, 1897
- Followed by: Solar eclipse of December 25, 1954

=== Triad ===
- Preceded by: Solar eclipse of March 15, 1839
- Followed by: Solar eclipse of November 13, 2012

=== Solar eclipses of 1924–1928 ===
This eclipse is a member of a semester series. An eclipse in a semester series of solar eclipses repeats approximately every 177 days and 4 hours (a semester) at alternating nodes of the Moon's orbit.

The partial solar eclipses on March 5, 1924 and August 30, 1924 occur in the previous lunar year eclipse set, and the solar eclipses on May 19, 1928 and November 12, 1928 occur in the next lunar year eclipse set.

Solar eclipse series sets from 1924 to 1928
| Ascending node | | | Descending node | | |
| Saros | Map | Gamma | Saros | Map | Gamma |
| 115 | July 31, 1924 Partial | −1.4459 | 120 | January 24, 1925 Total | 0.8661 |
| 125 | July 20, 1925 Annular | −0.7193 | 130 Totality in Sumatra, Indonesia | January 14, 1926 Total | 0.1973 |
| 135 | July 9, 1926 Annular | 0.0538 | 140 | January 3, 1927 Annular | −0.4956 |
| 145 | June 29, 1927 Total | 0.8163 | 150 | December 24, 1927 Partial | −1.2416 |
| 155 | June 17, 1928 Partial | 1.5107 | | | |

=== Saros 130 ===
This eclipse is a part of Saros series 130, repeating every 18 years, 11 days, and containing 73 events. The series started with a partial solar eclipse on August 20, 1096. It contains total eclipses from April 5, 1475 through July 18, 2232. There are no annular or hybrid eclipses in this set. The series ends at member 73 as a partial eclipse on October 25, 2394. Its eclipses are tabulated in three columns; every third eclipse in the same column is one exeligmos apart, so they all cast shadows over approximately the same parts of the Earth.

The longest duration of totality was produced by member 30 at 6 minutes, 41 seconds on July 11, 1619. All eclipses in this series occur at the Moon’s descending node of orbit.

Series members 41–62 occur between 1801 and 2200:
| 41 | 42 | 43 |
|---|---|---|
| November 9, 1817 | November 20, 1835 | November 30, 1853 |
| 44 | 45 | 46 |
| December 12, 1871 | December 22, 1889 | January 3, 1908 |
| 47 | 48 | 49 |
| January 14, 1926 | January 25, 1944 | February 5, 1962 |
| 50 | 51 | 52 |
| February 16, 1980 | February 26, 1998 | March 9, 2016 |
| 53 | 54 | 55 |
| March 20, 2034 | March 30, 2052 | April 11, 2070 |
| 56 | 57 | 58 |
| April 21, 2088 | May 3, 2106 | May 14, 2124 |
| 59 | 60 | 61 |
| May 25, 2142 | June 4, 2160 | June 16, 2178 |
62
June 26, 2196

=== Metonic series ===
The metonic series repeats eclipses every 19 years (6939.69 days), lasting about 5 cycles. Eclipses occur in nearly the same calendar date. In addition, the octon subseries repeats 1/5 of that or every 3.8 years (1387.94 days). All eclipses in this table occur at the Moon's descending node.

22 eclipse events between March 27, 1884 and August 20, 1971
| March 27–29 | January 14 | November 1–2 | August 20–21 | June 8 |
| 108 | 110 | 112 | 114 | 116 |
|---|---|---|---|---|
| March 27, 1884 | | | August 20, 1895 | June 8, 1899 |
| 118 | 120 | 122 | 124 | 126 |
| March 29, 1903 | January 14, 1907 | November 2, 1910 | August 21, 1914 | June 8, 1918 |
| 128 | 130 | 132 | 134 | 136 |
| March 28, 1922 | January 14, 1926 | November 1, 1929 | August 21, 1933 | June 8, 1937 |
| 138 | 140 | 142 | 144 | 146 |
| March 27, 1941 | January 14, 1945 | November 1, 1948 | August 20, 1952 | June 8, 1956 |
| 148 | 150 | 152 | 154 | |
| March 27, 1960 | January 14, 1964 | November 2, 1967 | August 20, 1971 | |

=== Tritos series ===
This eclipse is a part of a tritos cycle, repeating at alternating nodes every 135 synodic months (≈ 3986.63 days, or 11 years minus 1 month). Their appearance and longitude are irregular due to a lack of synchronization with the anomalistic month (period of perigee), but groupings of 3 tritos cycles (≈ 33 years minus 3 months) come close (≈ 434.044 anomalistic months), so eclipses are similar in these groupings.

Series members between 1801 and 2200
| December 21, 1805 (Saros 119) | November 19, 1816 (Saros 120) | October 20, 1827 (Saros 121) | September 18, 1838 (Saros 122) | August 18, 1849 (Saros 123) |
| July 18, 1860 (Saros 124) | June 18, 1871 (Saros 125) | May 17, 1882 (Saros 126) | April 16, 1893 (Saros 127) | March 17, 1904 (Saros 128) |
| February 14, 1915 (Saros 129) | January 14, 1926 (Saros 130) | December 13, 1936 (Saros 131) | November 12, 1947 (Saros 132) | October 12, 1958 (Saros 133) |
| September 11, 1969 (Saros 134) | August 10, 1980 (Saros 135) | July 11, 1991 (Saros 136) | June 10, 2002 (Saros 137) | May 10, 2013 (Saros 138) |
| April 8, 2024 (Saros 139) | March 9, 2035 (Saros 140) | February 5, 2046 (Saros 141) | January 5, 2057 (Saros 142) | December 6, 2067 (Saros 143) |
| November 4, 2078 (Saros 144) | October 4, 2089 (Saros 145) | September 4, 2100 (Saros 146) | August 4, 2111 (Saros 147) | July 4, 2122 (Saros 148) |
| June 3, 2133 (Saros 149) | May 3, 2144 (Saros 150) | April 2, 2155 (Saros 151) | March 2, 2166 (Saros 152) | January 29, 2177 (Saros 153) |
| December 29, 2187 (Saros 154) | November 28, 2198 (Saros 155) | | | |

=== Inex series ===
This eclipse is a part of the long period inex cycle, repeating at alternating nodes, every 358 synodic months (≈ 10,571.95 days, or 29 years minus 20 days). Their appearance and longitude are irregular due to a lack of synchronization with the anomalistic month (period of perigee). However, groupings of 3 inex cycles (≈ 87 years minus 2 months) comes close (≈ 1,151.02 anomalistic months), so eclipses are similar in these groupings.

Series members between 1801 and 2200
| April 4, 1810 (Saros 126) | March 15, 1839 (Saros 127) | February 23, 1868 (Saros 128) |
| February 1, 1897 (Saros 129) | January 14, 1926 (Saros 130) | December 25, 1954 (Saros 131) |
| December 4, 1983 (Saros 132) | November 13, 2012 (Saros 133) | October 25, 2041 (Saros 134) |
| October 4, 2070 (Saros 135) | September 14, 2099 (Saros 136) | August 25, 2128 (Saros 137) |
| August 5, 2157 (Saros 138) | July 16, 2186 (Saros 139) | |
