= Solar eclipse of January 25, 1944 =

Total eclipse

- Total eclipse
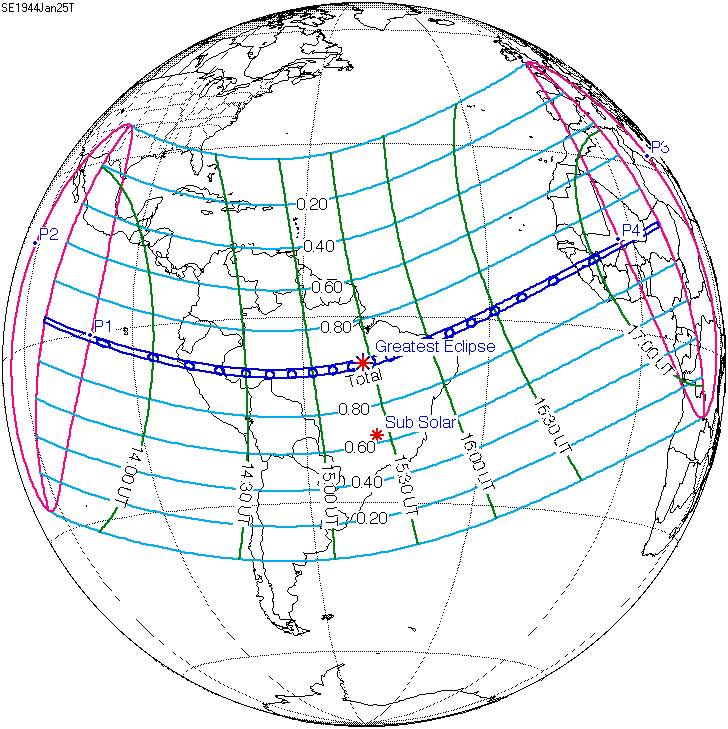
- Map
- Gamma: 0.2025
- Magnitude: 1.0428

Maximum eclipse
- Duration: 249 s (4 min 9 s)
- Coordinates: 7.6°S 50.2°W
- Max. width of band: 146 km (91 mi)

Times (UTC)
- Greatest eclipse: 15:26:42

References
- Saros: 130 (48 of 73)
- Catalog # (SE5000): 9384

A total solar eclipse occurred at the Moon's descending node of orbit on Tuesday, January 25, 1944, with a magnitude of 1.0428. A solar eclipse occurs when the Moon passes between Earth and the Sun, thereby totally or partly obscuring the image of the Sun for a viewer on Earth. A total solar eclipse occurs when the Moon's apparent diameter is larger than the Sun's, blocking all direct sunlight, turning day into darkness. Totality occurs in a narrow path across Earth's surface, with the partial solar eclipse visible over a surrounding region thousands of kilometres wide. Occurring about 20 hours before perigee (on January 26, 1944, at 11:30 UTC), the Moon's apparent diameter was larger.

Totality was visible from Peru, Brazil, British Sierra Leone (today's Sierra Leone), and French West Africa (the parts now belonging to Guinea, Mali, Burkina Faso and Niger, including Guinean capital Conakry). A partial eclipse was visible for parts of southern North America, Central America, the Caribbean, South America, Western Europe, West Africa, and Central Africa.

== Observations ==
The National Astronomical Observatory in Tacubaya, Mexico sent a team to Chiclayo, Peru. The weather was clear during the eclipse, and because totality occurred shortly after sunrise with a relatively low solar zenith angle, the boundary between the corona and the background of the sky was not so obvious. Most images were taken successfully except for one with the long focus camera.

== Eclipse details ==
Shown below are two tables displaying details about this particular solar eclipse. The first table outlines times at which the Moon's penumbra or umbra attains the specific parameter, and the second table describes various other parameters pertaining to this eclipse.

January 25, 1944 Solar Eclipse Times
Event	Time (UTC)
First Penumbral External Contact	1944 January 25 at 12:48:43.4 UTC
First Umbral External Contact	1944 January 25 at 13:44:39.3 UTC
First Central Line	1944 January 25 at 13:45:20.7 UTC
First Umbral Internal Contact	1944 January 25 at 13:46:02.2 UTC
First Penumbral Internal Contact	1944 January 25 at 14:43:56.2 UTC
Ecliptic Conjunction	1944 January 25 at 15:24:37.3 UTC
Greatest Duration	1944 January 25 at 15:25:00.3 UTC
Greatest Eclipse	1944 January 25 at 15:26:42.2 UTC
Equatorial Conjunction	1944 January 25 at 15:29:42.0 UTC
Last Penumbral Internal Contact	1944 January 25 at 16:09:24.1 UTC
Last Umbral Internal Contact	1944 January 25 at 17:07:18.8 UTC
Last Central Line	1944 January 25 at 17:08:01.3 UTC
Last Umbral External Contact	1944 January 25 at 17:08:43.9 UTC
Last Penumbral External Contact	1944 January 25 at 18:04:37.4 UTC

January 25, 1944 Solar Eclipse Parameters
Parameter	Value
Eclipse Magnitude	1.04282
Eclipse Obscuration	1.08747
Gamma	0.20246
Sun Right Ascension	20h27m33.6s
Sun Declination	-19°07'44.1"
Sun Semi-Diameter	16'14.7"
Sun Equatorial Horizontal Parallax	08.9"
Moon Right Ascension	20h27m26.2s
Moon Declination	-18°55'30.7"
Moon Semi-Diameter	16'39.5"
Moon Equatorial Horizontal Parallax	1°01'08.4"
ΔT	26.3 s

== Eclipse season ==
This eclipse is part of an eclipse season, a period, roughly every six months, when eclipses occur. Only two (or occasionally three) eclipse seasons occur each year, and each season lasts about 35 days and repeats just short of six months (173 days) later; thus two full eclipse seasons always occur each year. Either two or three eclipses happen each eclipse season. In the sequence below, each eclipse is separated by a fortnight.

Eclipse season of January–February 1944
January 25 Descending node (new moon)	February 9 Ascending node (full moon)
Total solar eclipse Solar Saros 130	Penumbral lunar eclipse Lunar Saros 142

== Related eclipses ==
=== Eclipses in 1944 ===
- A total solar eclipse on January 25.
- A penumbral lunar eclipse on February 9.
- A penumbral lunar eclipse on July 6.
- An annular solar eclipse on July 20.
- A penumbral lunar eclipse on August 4.
- A penumbral lunar eclipse on December 29.

=== Metonic ===
- Preceded by: Solar eclipse of April 7, 1940
- Followed by: Solar eclipse of November 12, 1947

=== Tzolkinex ===
- Preceded by: Solar eclipse of December 13, 1936
- Followed by: Solar eclipse of March 7, 1951

=== Half-Saros ===
- Preceded by: Lunar eclipse of January 19, 1935
- Followed by: Lunar eclipse of January 29, 1953

=== Tritos ===
- Preceded by: Solar eclipse of February 24, 1933
- Followed by: Solar eclipse of December 25, 1954

=== Solar Saros 130 ===
- Preceded by: Solar eclipse of January 14, 1926
- Followed by: Solar eclipse of February 5, 1962

=== Inex ===
- Preceded by: Solar eclipse of February 14, 1915
- Followed by: Solar eclipse of January 4, 1973

=== Triad ===
- Preceded by: Solar eclipse of March 25, 1857
- Followed by: Solar eclipse of November 25, 2030

=== Solar eclipses of 1942–1946 ===
This eclipse is a member of a semester series. An eclipse in a semester series of solar eclipses repeats approximately every 177 days and 4 hours (a semester) at alternating nodes of the Moon's orbit.

The partial solar eclipses on March 16, 1942 and September 10, 1942 occur in the previous lunar year eclipse set, and the partial solar eclipses on May 30, 1946 and November 23, 1946 occur in the next lunar year eclipse set.

Solar eclipse series sets from 1942 to 1946
Ascending node			Descending node		
Saros	Map	Gamma	Saros	Map	Gamma
115	August 12, 1942 Partial	−1.5244	120	February 4, 1943 Total	0.8734
125	August 1, 1943 Annular	−0.8041	130	January 25, 1944 Total	0.2025
135	July 20, 1944 Annular	−0.0314	140	January 14, 1945 Annular	−0.4937
145	July 9, 1945 Total	0.7356	150	January 3, 1946 Partial	−1.2392
155	June 29, 1946 Partial	1.4361			

=== Saros 130 ===
This eclipse is a part of Saros series 130, repeating every 18 years, 11 days, and containing 73 events. The series started with a partial solar eclipse on August 20, 1096. It contains total eclipses from April 5, 1475 through July 18, 2232. There are no annular or hybrid eclipses in this set. The series ends at member 73 as a partial eclipse on October 25, 2394. Its eclipses are tabulated in three columns; every third eclipse in the same column is one exeligmos apart, so they all cast shadows over approximately the same parts of the Earth.

The longest duration of totality was produced by member 30 at 6 minutes, 41 seconds on July 11, 1619. All eclipses in this series occur at the Moon’s descending node of orbit.

Series members 41–62 occur between 1801 and 2200:
41	42	43
November 9, 1817	November 20, 1835	November 30, 1853
44	45	46
December 12, 1871	December 22, 1889	January 3, 1908
47	48	49
January 14, 1926	January 25, 1944	February 5, 1962
50	51	52
February 16, 1980	February 26, 1998	March 9, 2016
53	54	55
March 20, 2034	March 30, 2052	April 11, 2070
56	57	58
April 21, 2088	May 3, 2106	May 14, 2124
59	60	61
May 25, 2142	June 4, 2160	June 16, 2178
62
June 26, 2196

=== Metonic series ===
The metonic series repeats eclipses every 19 years (6939.69 days), lasting about 5 cycles. Eclipses occur in nearly the same calendar date. In addition, the octon subseries repeats 1/5 of that or every 3.8 years (1387.94 days). All eclipses in this table occur at the Moon's descending node.

22 eclipse events between April 8, 1902 and August 31, 1989
April 7–8	January 24–25	November 12	August 31–September 1	June 19–20
108	110	112	114	116
April 8, 1902			August 31, 1913	June 19, 1917
118	120	122	124	126
April 8, 1921	January 24, 1925	November 12, 1928	August 31, 1932	June 19, 1936
128	130	132	134	136
April 7, 1940	January 25, 1944	November 12, 1947	September 1, 1951	June 20, 1955
138	140	142	144	146
April 8, 1959	January 25, 1963	November 12, 1966	August 31, 1970	June 20, 1974
148	150	152	154	
April 7, 1978	January 25, 1982	November 12, 1985	August 31, 1989	

=== Tritos series ===
This eclipse is a part of a tritos cycle, repeating at alternating nodes every 135 synodic months (≈ 3986.63 days, or 11 years minus 1 month). Their appearance and longitude are irregular due to a lack of synchronization with the anomalistic month (period of perigee), but groupings of 3 tritos cycles (≈ 33 years minus 3 months) come close (≈ 434.044 anomalistic months), so eclipses are similar in these groupings.

Series members between 1801 and 2200
March 4, 1802 (Saros 117)	February 1, 1813 (Saros 118)	January 1, 1824 (Saros 119)	November 30, 1834 (Saros 120)	October 30, 1845 (Saros 121)
September 29, 1856 (Saros 122)	August 29, 1867 (Saros 123)	July 29, 1878 (Saros 124)	June 28, 1889 (Saros 125)	May 28, 1900 (Saros 126)
April 28, 1911 (Saros 127)	March 28, 1922 (Saros 128)	February 24, 1933 (Saros 129)	January 25, 1944 (Saros 130)	December 25, 1954 (Saros 131)
November 23, 1965 (Saros 132)	October 23, 1976 (Saros 133)	September 23, 1987 (Saros 134)	August 22, 1998 (Saros 135)	July 22, 2009 (Saros 136)
June 21, 2020 (Saros 137)	May 21, 2031 (Saros 138)	April 20, 2042 (Saros 139)	March 20, 2053 (Saros 140)	February 17, 2064 (Saros 141)
January 16, 2075 (Saros 142)	December 16, 2085 (Saros 143)	November 15, 2096 (Saros 144)	October 16, 2107 (Saros 145)	September 15, 2118 (Saros 146)
August 15, 2129 (Saros 147)	July 14, 2140 (Saros 148)	June 14, 2151 (Saros 149)	May 14, 2162 (Saros 150)	April 12, 2173 (Saros 151)
March 12, 2184 (Saros 152)	February 10, 2195 (Saros 153)			

=== Inex series ===
This eclipse is a part of the long period inex cycle, repeating at alternating nodes, every 358 synodic months (≈ 10,571.95 days, or 29 years minus 20 days). Their appearance and longitude are irregular due to a lack of synchronization with the anomalistic month (period of perigee). However, groupings of 3 inex cycles (≈ 87 years minus 2 months) comes close (≈ 1,151.02 anomalistic months), so eclipses are similar in these groupings.

Series members between 1801 and 2200
April 14, 1828 (Saros 126)	March 25, 1857 (Saros 127)	March 5, 1886 (Saros 128)
February 14, 1915 (Saros 129)	January 25, 1944 (Saros 130)	January 4, 1973 (Saros 131)
December 14, 2001 (Saros 132)	November 25, 2030 (Saros 133)	November 5, 2059 (Saros 134)
October 14, 2088 (Saros 135)	September 26, 2117 (Saros 136)	September 6, 2146 (Saros 137)
August 16, 2175 (Saros 138)		
