= Solar eclipse of March 28, 1922 =

20th-century annular solar eclipse

- Annular eclipse
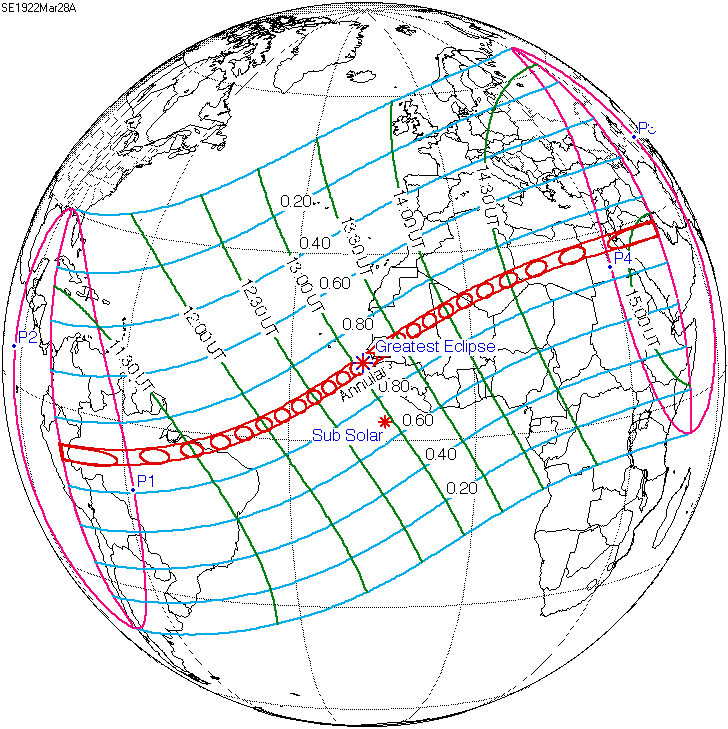
- Map
- Gamma: 0.1711
- Magnitude: 0.9381

Maximum eclipse
- Duration: 470 s (7 min 50 s)
- Coordinates: 12.3°N 18°W
- Max. width of band: 233 km (145 mi)

Times (UTC)
- Greatest eclipse: 13:05:26

References
- Saros: 128 (53 of 73)
- Catalog # (SE5000): 9332

An annular solar eclipse occurred at the Moon's descending node of orbit on Tuesday, March 28, 1922, with a magnitude of 0.9381. A solar eclipse occurs when the Moon passes between Earth and the Sun, thereby totally or partly obscuring the image of the Sun for a viewer on Earth. An annular solar eclipse occurs when the Moon's apparent diameter is smaller than the Sun's, blocking most of the Sun's light and causing the Sun to look like an annulus (ring). An annular eclipse appears as a partial eclipse over a region of the Earth thousands of kilometres wide. Occurring about 2.75 days after apogee (on March 25, 1922, at 19:30 UTC), the Moon's apparent diameter was smaller.

Annularity was visible from Peru, Brazil, French West Africa (parts now belonging to Senegal, Mauritania and Mali), British Gambia (today's Gambia) including capital Banjul, French Algeria (today's Algeria), Italian Libya (today's Libya), Egypt, Kingdom of Hejaz and Sultanate of Nejd (now belonging to Saudi Arabia), and Sheikhdom of Kuwait (today's Kuwait). A partial eclipse was visible for parts of South America, the Caribbean, North Africa, Central Africa, Europe, and the Middle East.

== Eclipse details ==
Shown below are two tables displaying details about this particular solar eclipse. The first table outlines times at which the Moon's penumbra or umbra attains the specific parameter, and the second table describes various other parameters pertaining to this eclipse.

March 28, 1922 Solar Eclipse Times
Event	Time (UTC)
First Penumbral External Contact	1922 March 28 at 10:01:22.5 UTC
First Umbral External Contact	1922 March 28 at 11:06:26.9 UTC
First Central Line	1922 March 28 at 11:09:09.9 UTC
First Umbral Internal Contact	1922 March 28 at 11:11:53.0 UTC
First Penumbral Internal Contact	1922 March 28 at 12:18:44.5 UTC
Ecliptic Conjunction	1922 March 28 at 13:03:23.4 UTC
Greatest Eclipse	1922 March 28 at 13:05:25.8 UTC
Greatest Duration	1922 March 28 at 13:06:46.6 UTC
Equatorial Conjunction	1922 March 28 at 13:11:48.1 UTC
Last Penumbral Internal Contact	1922 March 28 at 13:51:56.9 UTC
Last Umbral Internal Contact	1922 March 28 at 14:58:55.1 UTC
Last Central Line	1922 March 28 at 15:01:36.7 UTC
Last Umbral External Contact	1922 March 28 at 15:04:18.1 UTC
Last Penumbral External Contact	1922 March 28 at 16:09:22.4 UTC

March 28, 1922 Solar Eclipse Parameters
Parameter	Value
Eclipse Magnitude	0.93810
Eclipse Obscuration	0.88002
Gamma	0.17106
Sun Right Ascension	00h25m58.2s
Sun Declination	+02°48'27.5"
Sun Semi-Diameter	16'01.1"
Sun Equatorial Horizontal Parallax	08.8"
Moon Right Ascension	00h25m47.1s
Moon Declination	+02°57'17.9"
Moon Semi-Diameter	14'48.3"
Moon Equatorial Horizontal Parallax	0°54'20.0"
ΔT	22.5 s

== Eclipse season ==
This eclipse is part of an eclipse season, a period, roughly every six months, when eclipses occur. Only two (or occasionally three) eclipse seasons occur each year, and each season lasts about 35 days and repeats just short of six months (173 days) later; thus two full eclipse seasons always occur each year. Either two or three eclipses happen each eclipse season. In the sequence below, each eclipse is separated by a fortnight. The first and last eclipse in this sequence is separated by one synodic month.

Eclipse season of March–April 1922
March 13 Ascending node (full moon)	March 28 Descending node (new moon)	April 11 Ascending node (full moon)
Penumbral lunar eclipse Lunar Saros 102	Annular solar eclipse Solar Saros 128	Penumbral lunar eclipse Lunar Saros 140

== Related eclipses ==
=== Eclipses in 1922 ===
- A penumbral lunar eclipse on March 13.
- An annular solar eclipse on March 28.
- A penumbral lunar eclipse on April 11.
- A total solar eclipse on September 21.
- A penumbral lunar eclipse on October 6.

=== Metonic ===
- Preceded by: Solar eclipse of June 8, 1918
- Followed by: Solar eclipse of January 14, 1926

=== Tzolkinex ===
- Preceded by: Solar eclipse of February 14, 1915
- Followed by: Solar eclipse of May 9, 1929

=== Half-Saros ===
- Preceded by: Lunar eclipse of March 22, 1913
- Followed by: Lunar eclipse of April 2, 1931

=== Tritos ===
- Preceded by: Solar eclipse of April 28, 1911
- Followed by: Solar eclipse of February 24, 1933

=== Solar Saros 128 ===
- Preceded by: Solar eclipse of March 17, 1904
- Followed by: Solar eclipse of April 7, 1940

=== Inex ===
- Preceded by: Solar eclipse of April 16, 1893
- Followed by: Solar eclipse of March 7, 1951

=== Triad ===
- Preceded by: Solar eclipse of May 27, 1835
- Followed by: Solar eclipse of January 26, 2009

=== Solar eclipses of 1921–1924 ===
This eclipse is a member of a semester series. An eclipse in a semester series of solar eclipses repeats approximately every 177 days and 4 hours (a semester) at alternating nodes of the Moon's orbit.

The partial solar eclipse on July 31, 1924 occurs in the next lunar year eclipse set.

Solar eclipse series sets from 1921 to 1924
Descending node			Ascending node		
Saros	Map	Gamma	Saros	Map	Gamma
118	April 8, 1921 Annular	0.8869	123	October 1, 1921 Total	−0.9383
128	March 28, 1922 Annular	0.1711	133	September 21, 1922 Total	−0.213
138	March 17, 1923 Annular	−0.5438	143	September 10, 1923 Total	0.5149
148	March 5, 1924 Partial	−1.2232	153	August 30, 1924 Partial	1.3123

=== Saros 128 ===
This eclipse is a part of Saros series 128, repeating every 18 years, 11 days, and containing 73 events. The series started with a partial solar eclipse on August 29, 984 AD. It contains total eclipses from May 16, 1417 through June 18, 1471; hybrid eclipses from June 28, 1489 through July 31, 1543; and annular eclipses from August 11, 1561 through July 25, 2120. The series ends at member 73 as a partial eclipse on November 1, 2282. Its eclipses are tabulated in three columns; every third eclipse in the same column is one exeligmos apart, so they all cast shadows over approximately the same parts of the Earth.

The longest duration of totality was produced by member 27 at 1 minutes, 45 seconds on June 7, 1453, and the longest duration of annularity was produced by member 48 at 8 minutes, 35 seconds on February 1, 1832. All eclipses in this series occur at the Moon’s descending node of orbit.

Series members 47–68 occur between 1801 and 2200:
47	48	49
January 21, 1814	February 1, 1832	February 12, 1850
50	51	52
February 23, 1868	March 5, 1886	March 17, 1904
53	54	55
March 28, 1922	April 7, 1940	April 19, 1958
56	57	58
April 29, 1976	May 10, 1994	May 20, 2012
59	60	61
June 1, 2030	June 11, 2048	June 22, 2066
62	63	64
July 3, 2084	July 15, 2102	July 25, 2120
65	66	67
August 5, 2138	August 16, 2156	August 27, 2174
68
September 6, 2192

=== Metonic series ===
The metonic series repeats eclipses every 19 years (6939.69 days), lasting about 5 cycles. Eclipses occur in nearly the same calendar date. In addition, the octon subseries repeats 1/5 of that or every 3.8 years (1387.94 days). All eclipses in this table occur at the Moon's descending node.

22 eclipse events between March 27, 1884 and August 20, 1971
March 27–29	January 14	November 1–2	August 20–21	June 8
108	110	112	114	116
March 27, 1884			August 20, 1895	June 8, 1899
118	120	122	124	126
March 29, 1903	January 14, 1907	November 2, 1910	August 21, 1914	June 8, 1918
128	130	132	134	136
March 28, 1922	January 14, 1926	November 1, 1929	August 21, 1933	June 8, 1937
138	140	142	144	146
March 27, 1941	January 14, 1945	November 1, 1948	August 20, 1952	June 8, 1956
148	150	152	154	
March 27, 1960	January 14, 1964	November 2, 1967	August 20, 1971	

=== Tritos series ===
This eclipse is a part of a tritos cycle, repeating at alternating nodes every 135 synodic months (≈ 3986.63 days, or 11 years minus 1 month). Their appearance and longitude are irregular due to a lack of synchronization with the anomalistic month (period of perigee), but groupings of 3 tritos cycles (≈ 33 years minus 3 months) come close (≈ 434.044 anomalistic months), so eclipses are similar in these groupings.

Series members between 1801 and 2200
March 4, 1802 (Saros 117)	February 1, 1813 (Saros 118)	January 1, 1824 (Saros 119)	November 30, 1834 (Saros 120)	October 30, 1845 (Saros 121)
September 29, 1856 (Saros 122)	August 29, 1867 (Saros 123)	July 29, 1878 (Saros 124)	June 28, 1889 (Saros 125)	May 28, 1900 (Saros 126)
April 28, 1911 (Saros 127)	March 28, 1922 (Saros 128)	February 24, 1933 (Saros 129)	January 25, 1944 (Saros 130)	December 25, 1954 (Saros 131)
November 23, 1965 (Saros 132)	October 23, 1976 (Saros 133)	September 23, 1987 (Saros 134)	August 22, 1998 (Saros 135)	July 22, 2009 (Saros 136)
June 21, 2020 (Saros 137)	May 21, 2031 (Saros 138)	April 20, 2042 (Saros 139)	March 20, 2053 (Saros 140)	February 17, 2064 (Saros 141)
January 16, 2075 (Saros 142)	December 16, 2085 (Saros 143)	November 15, 2096 (Saros 144)	October 16, 2107 (Saros 145)	September 15, 2118 (Saros 146)
August 15, 2129 (Saros 147)	July 14, 2140 (Saros 148)	June 14, 2151 (Saros 149)	May 14, 2162 (Saros 150)	April 12, 2173 (Saros 151)
March 12, 2184 (Saros 152)	February 10, 2195 (Saros 153)			

=== Inex series ===
This eclipse is a part of the long period inex cycle, repeating at alternating nodes, every 358 synodic months (≈ 10,571.95 days, or 29 years minus 20 days). Their appearance and longitude are irregular due to a lack of synchronization with the anomalistic month (period of perigee). However, groupings of 3 inex cycles (≈ 87 years minus 2 months) comes close (≈ 1,151.02 anomalistic months), so eclipses are similar in these groupings.

Series members between 1801 and 2200
June 16, 1806 (Saros 124)	May 27, 1835 (Saros 125)	May 6, 1864 (Saros 126)
April 16, 1893 (Saros 127)	March 28, 1922 (Saros 128)	March 7, 1951 (Saros 129)
February 16, 1980 (Saros 130)	January 26, 2009 (Saros 131)	January 5, 2038 (Saros 132)
December 17, 2066 (Saros 133)	November 27, 2095 (Saros 134)	November 6, 2124 (Saros 135)
October 17, 2153 (Saros 136)	September 27, 2182 (Saros 137)	
