= Solar eclipse of February 16, 1980 =

Total eclipse

- Total eclipse
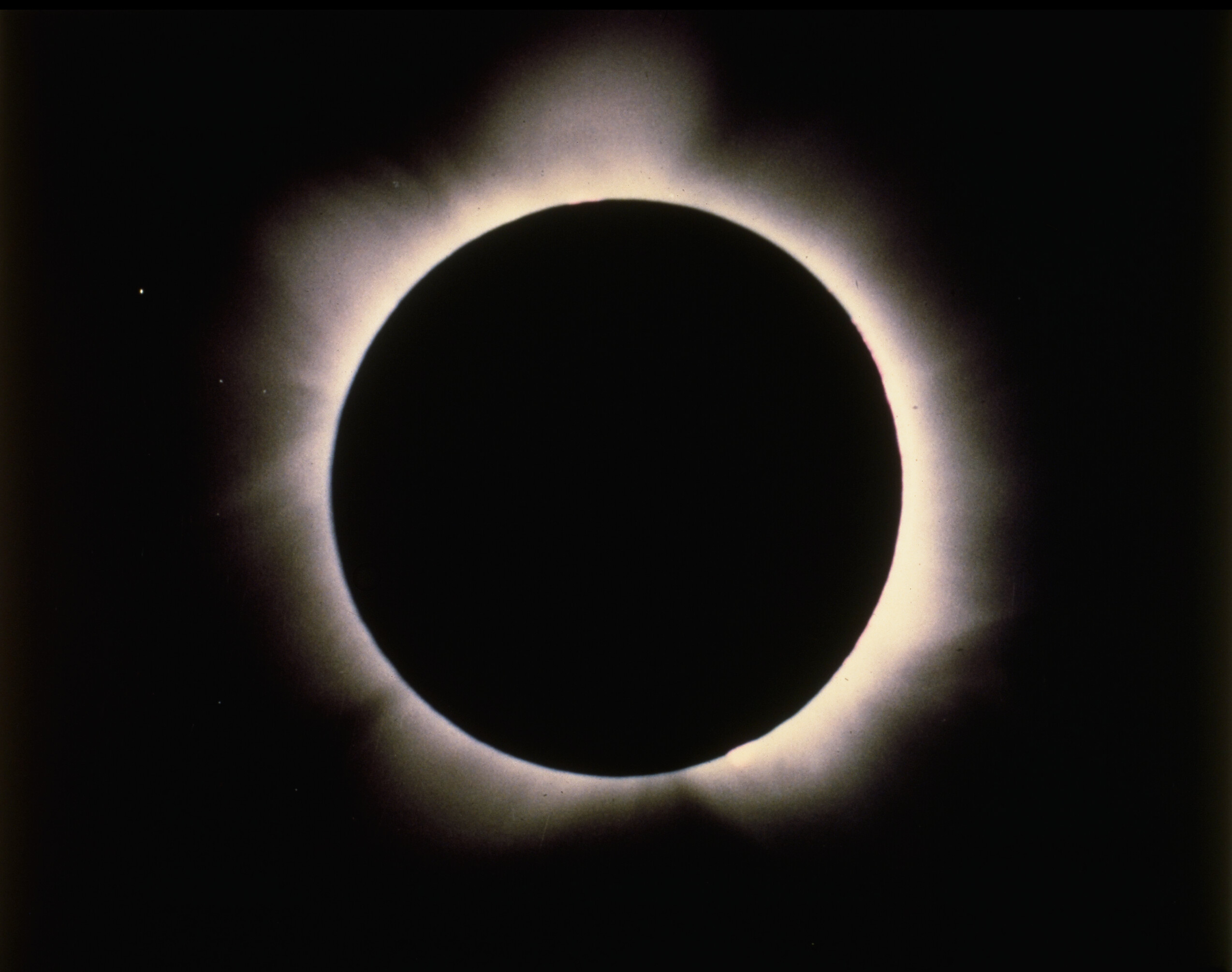

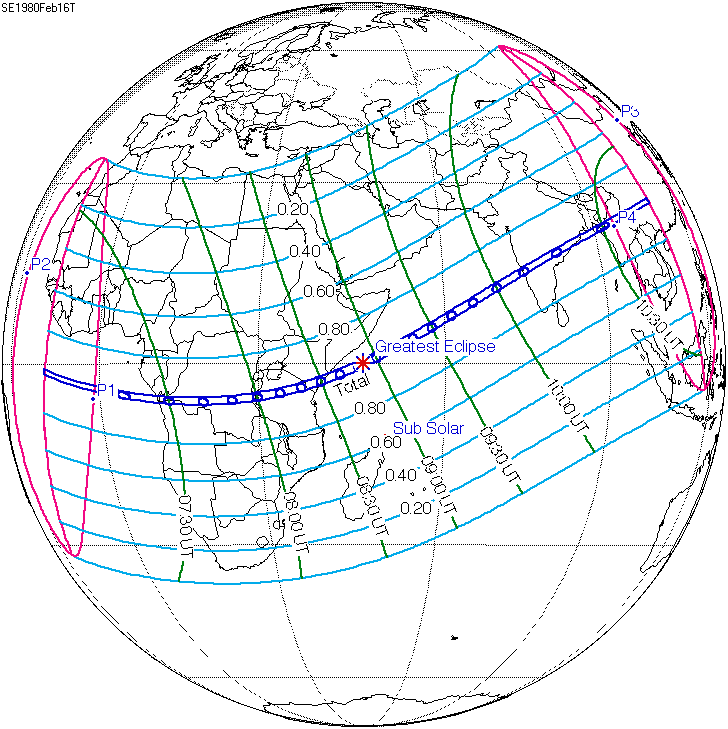
- Map
- Gamma: 0.2224
- Magnitude: 1.0434

Maximum eclipse
- Duration: 248 s (4 min 8 s)
- Coordinates: 0.1°S 47.1°E
- Max. width of band: 149 km (93 mi)

Times (UTC)
- Greatest eclipse: 8:54:01

References
- Saros: 130 (50 of 73)
- Catalog # (SE5000): 9464

A total solar eclipse occurred at the Moon's descending node of orbit on Saturday, February 16, 1980, with a magnitude of 1.0434. A solar eclipse occurs when the Moon passes between Earth and the Sun, thereby totally or partly obscuring the image of the Sun for a viewer on Earth. A total solar eclipse occurs when the Moon's apparent diameter is larger than the Sun's, blocking all direct sunlight, turning day into darkness. Totality occurs in a narrow path across Earth's surface, with the partial solar eclipse visible over a surrounding region thousands of kilometres wide. Occurring about 1 day before perigee (on February 17, 1980, at 8:50 UTC), the Moon's apparent diameter was larger.

The path of totality crossed parts of Angola, Zaire, Tanzania, Kenya, southern India, Bangladesh, Burma, and China at sunset. The southern part of Mount Kilimanjaro, the highest mountain in Africa, also lay in the path of totality. A partial eclipse was visible for parts of Africa, West Asia, Central Asia, South Asia, and Southeast Asia.

== Observations ==
=== India ===
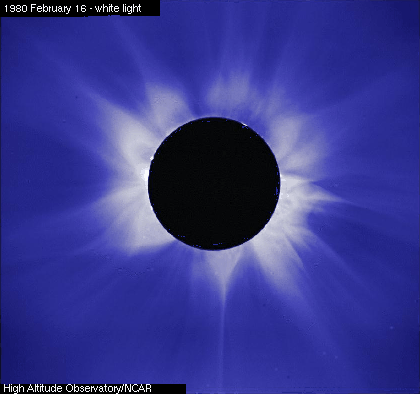
This eclipse occurred near the solar maximum, when the helmet streamer tends to be more symmetrically distributed. Image taken in India.

This was the third total solar eclipse visible from mainland India excluding the Andaman and Nicobar Islands in the 20th century. However, most of the path of totality of the solar eclipse of August 21, 1914 in British India now belongs to Pakistan, and the only place within the path of totality of the solar eclipse of June 30, 1954 in India was in the Thar Desert where a total eclipse occurred right before sunset. Therefore, this was actually the first total solar eclipse visible from India with good observation conditions since January 22, 1898.

The Indian Institute of Astrophysics established two camps at Hosur near Hubli and at Jawalagera near Raichur, analyzing the chromospheric and coronal radiation. Observation teams from Czechoslovakia and Yugoslavia also made observations nearby. The Astronomical Institute of Slovak Academy of Sciences also sent a team of 7 people near Jawalagera. The weather condition was good and the team took images of the corona.

=== China ===
In China, the eclipse occurred on the exact date of the Lunar New Year.

Being the first total solar eclipse visible from China after the Cultural Revolution, this eclipse offered much better conditions for observations, compared with the solar eclipse of September 22, 1968, the previous total one visible from China. Although both occurred before sunset with a low solar zenith angle in China, the maximum duration of totality within China was more than 1 minute and 40 seconds for this eclipse, and less than half a minute for the one in 1968.

The Chinese Academy of Sciences held a solar physics conference in Kunming in April 1975, proposing to form a joint observation of the eclipse. In March 1976, a field trip to select the location of observation was conducted. A total of 31 aspects of observations were organized, including solar optical and radio observations, ionosphere, Earth's magnetic field and gravitational field measurements. The meteorological department also studied weather changes during the eclipse. Optical observations in China were mainly conducted at Yingpan Mountain in Ruili County (now Ruili City), Yunnan, while radio observations were at Yunnan Astronomical Observatory in Fenghuang Mountain, Kunming. In addition, Shanghai Scientific and Educational Film Studio made a documentary on the entire process of the observation.

== Eclipse season ==
This eclipse is part of an eclipse season, a period, roughly every six months, when eclipses occur. Only two (or occasionally three) eclipse seasons occur each year, and each season lasts about 35 days and repeats just short of six months (173 days) later; thus two full eclipse seasons always occur each year. Either two or three eclipses happen each eclipse season. In the sequence below, each eclipse is separated by a fortnight.

Eclipse season of February–March 1980
February 16 Descending node (new moon)	March 1 Ascending node (full moon)
Total solar eclipse Solar Saros 130	Penumbral lunar eclipse Lunar Saros 142

== Related eclipses ==
=== Eclipses in 1980 ===
- A total solar eclipse on February 16.
- A penumbral lunar eclipse on March 1.
- A penumbral lunar eclipse on July 27.
- An annular solar eclipse on August 10.
- A penumbral lunar eclipse on August 26.

=== Metonic ===
- Preceded by: Solar eclipse of April 29, 1976
- Followed by: Solar eclipse of December 4, 1983

=== Tzolkinex ===
- Preceded by: Solar eclipse of January 4, 1973
- Followed by: Solar eclipse of March 29, 1987

=== Half-Saros ===
- Preceded by: Lunar eclipse of February 10, 1971
- Followed by: Lunar eclipse of February 20, 1989

=== Tritos ===
- Preceded by: Solar eclipse of March 18, 1969
- Followed by: Solar eclipse of January 15, 1991

=== Solar Saros 130 ===
- Preceded by: Solar eclipse of February 5, 1962
- Followed by: Solar eclipse of February 26, 1998

=== Inex ===
- Preceded by: Solar eclipse of March 7, 1951
- Followed by: Solar eclipse of January 26, 2009

=== Triad ===
- Preceded by: Solar eclipse of April 16, 1893
- Followed by: Solar eclipse of December 17, 2066

=== Solar eclipses of 1979–1982 ===
This eclipse is a member of a semester series. An eclipse in a semester series of solar eclipses repeats approximately every 177 days and 4 hours (a semester) at alternating nodes of the Moon's orbit.

The partial solar eclipses on June 21, 1982 and December 15, 1982 occur in the next lunar year eclipse set.

Solar eclipse series sets from 1979 to 1982
Descending node			Ascending node		
Saros	Map	Gamma	Saros	Map	Gamma
120 Totality in Brandon, MB, Canada	February 26, 1979 Total	0.8981	125	August 22, 1979 Annular	−0.9632
130	February 16, 1980 Total	0.2224	135	August 10, 1980 Annular	−0.1915
140	February 4, 1981 Annular	−0.4838	145	July 31, 1981 Total	0.5792
150	January 25, 1982 Partial	−1.2311	155	July 20, 1982 Partial	1.2886

=== Saros 130 ===
This eclipse is a part of Saros series 130, repeating every 18 years, 11 days, and containing 73 events. The series started with a partial solar eclipse on August 20, 1096. It contains total eclipses from April 5, 1475 through July 18, 2232. There are no annular or hybrid eclipses in this set. The series ends at member 73 as a partial eclipse on October 25, 2394. Its eclipses are tabulated in three columns; every third eclipse in the same column is one exeligmos apart, so they all cast shadows over approximately the same parts of the Earth.

The longest duration of totality was produced by member 30 at 6 minutes, 41 seconds on July 11, 1619. All eclipses in this series occur at the Moon’s descending node of orbit.

Series members 41–62 occur between 1801 and 2200:
41	42	43
November 9, 1817	November 20, 1835	November 30, 1853
44	45	46
December 12, 1871	December 22, 1889	January 3, 1908
47	48	49
January 14, 1926	January 25, 1944	February 5, 1962
50	51	52
February 16, 1980	February 26, 1998	March 9, 2016
53	54	55
March 20, 2034	March 30, 2052	April 11, 2070
56	57	58
April 21, 2088	May 3, 2106	May 14, 2124
59	60	61
May 25, 2142	June 4, 2160	June 16, 2178
62
June 26, 2196

=== Metonic series ===
The metonic series repeats eclipses every 19 years (6939.69 days), lasting about 5 cycles. Eclipses occur in nearly the same calendar date. In addition, the octon subseries repeats 1/5 of that or every 3.8 years (1387.94 days). All eclipses in this table occur at the Moon's descending node.

21 eclipse events between July 11, 1953 and July 11, 2029
July 10–11	April 29–30	February 15–16	December 4	September 21–23
116	118	120	122	124
July 11, 1953	April 30, 1957	February 15, 1961	December 4, 1964	September 22, 1968
126	128	130	132	134
July 10, 1972	April 29, 1976	February 16, 1980	December 4, 1983	September 23, 1987
136	138	140	142	144
July 11, 1991	April 29, 1995	February 16, 1999	December 4, 2002	September 22, 2006
146	148	150	152	154
July 11, 2010	April 29, 2014	February 15, 2018	December 4, 2021	September 21, 2025
156
July 11, 2029

=== Tritos series ===
This eclipse is a part of a tritos cycle, repeating at alternating nodes every 135 synodic months (≈ 3986.63 days, or 11 years minus 1 month). Their appearance and longitude are irregular due to a lack of synchronization with the anomalistic month (period of perigee), but groupings of 3 tritos cycles (≈ 33 years minus 3 months) come close (≈ 434.044 anomalistic months), so eclipses are similar in these groupings.

Series members between 1801 and 2200
June 26, 1805 (Saros 114)	May 27, 1816 (Saros 115)	April 26, 1827 (Saros 116)	March 25, 1838 (Saros 117)	February 23, 1849 (Saros 118)
January 23, 1860 (Saros 119)	December 22, 1870 (Saros 120)	November 21, 1881 (Saros 121)	October 20, 1892 (Saros 122)	September 21, 1903 (Saros 123)
August 21, 1914 (Saros 124)	July 20, 1925 (Saros 125)	June 19, 1936 (Saros 126)	May 20, 1947 (Saros 127)	April 19, 1958 (Saros 128)
March 18, 1969 (Saros 129)	February 16, 1980 (Saros 130)	January 15, 1991 (Saros 131)	December 14, 2001 (Saros 132)	November 13, 2012 (Saros 133)
October 14, 2023 (Saros 134)	September 12, 2034 (Saros 135)	August 12, 2045 (Saros 136)	July 12, 2056 (Saros 137)	June 11, 2067 (Saros 138)
May 11, 2078 (Saros 139)	April 10, 2089 (Saros 140)	March 10, 2100 (Saros 141)	February 8, 2111 (Saros 142)	January 8, 2122 (Saros 143)
December 7, 2132 (Saros 144)	November 7, 2143 (Saros 145)	October 7, 2154 (Saros 146)	September 5, 2165 (Saros 147)	August 4, 2176 (Saros 148)
July 6, 2187 (Saros 149)	June 4, 2198 (Saros 150)			

=== Inex series ===
This eclipse is a part of the long period inex cycle, repeating at alternating nodes, every 358 synodic months (≈ 10,571.95 days, or 29 years minus 20 days). Their appearance and longitude are irregular due to a lack of synchronization with the anomalistic month (period of perigee). However, groupings of 3 inex cycles (≈ 87 years minus 2 months) comes close (≈ 1,151.02 anomalistic months), so eclipses are similar in these groupings.

Series members between 1801 and 2200
June 16, 1806 (Saros 124)	May 27, 1835 (Saros 125)	May 6, 1864 (Saros 126)
April 16, 1893 (Saros 127)	March 28, 1922 (Saros 128)	March 7, 1951 (Saros 129)
February 16, 1980 (Saros 130)	January 26, 2009 (Saros 131)	January 5, 2038 (Saros 132)
December 17, 2066 (Saros 133)	November 27, 2095 (Saros 134)	November 6, 2124 (Saros 135)
October 17, 2153 (Saros 136)	September 27, 2182 (Saros 137)	
