= Solar eclipse of February 14, 1915 =

20th-century annular solar eclipse

- Annular eclipse
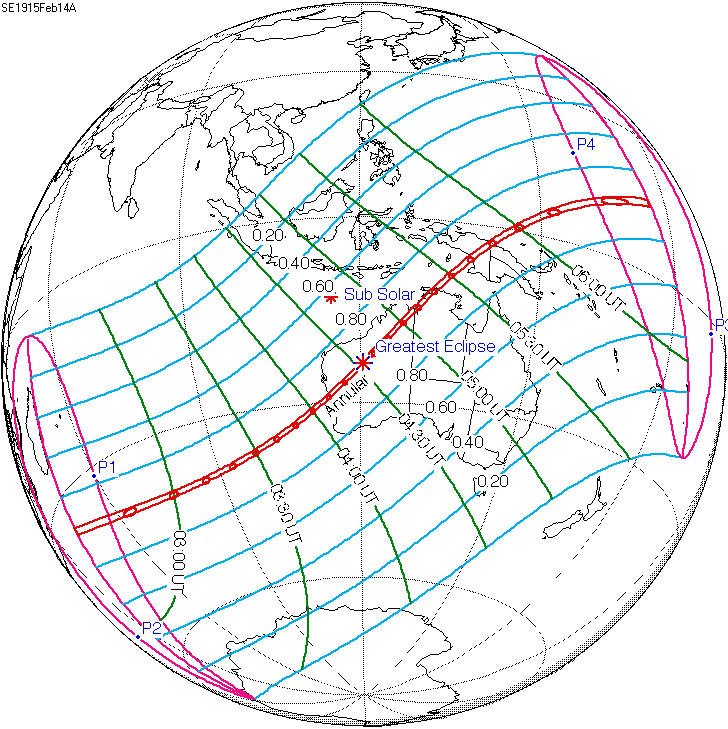
- Map
- Gamma: −0.2024
- Magnitude: 0.9789

Maximum eclipse
- Duration: 124 s (2 min 4 s)
- Coordinates: 24°S 120.7°E
- Max. width of band: 77 km (48 mi)

Times (UTC)
- Greatest eclipse: 4:33:20

References
- Saros: 129 (46 of 80)
- Catalog # (SE5000): 9315

An annular solar eclipse occurred at the Moon's ascending node of orbit on Sunday, February 14, 1915, with a magnitude of 0.9789. A solar eclipse occurs when the Moon passes between Earth and the Sun, thereby totally or partly obscuring the image of the Sun for a viewer on Earth. An annular solar eclipse occurs when the Moon's apparent diameter is smaller than the Sun's, blocking most of the Sun's light and causing the Sun to look like an annulus (ring). An annular eclipse appears as a partial eclipse over a region of the Earth thousands of kilometres wide. The Moon's apparent diameter was near the average diameter because it occurred 6.7 days after perigee (on February 7, 1915, at 13:20 UTC) and 7.1 days before apogee (on February 21, 1915, at 5:50 UTC).

Annularity was visible from Australia, Papua in Dutch East Indies (today's Indonesia), German New Guinea (now belonging to Papua New Guinea), and the South Seas Mandate of Japan (the parts now belonging to FS Micronesia and Marshall Islands, including Palikir). A partial eclipse was visible for parts of Antarctica, Australia, Oceania, and Southeast Asia.

The eclipse occurred on February 14 in the whole path of annularity, and also most of the places where a partial eclipse was visible. It was on February 13 only in a small part east of the International Date Line.

The date of this eclipse visible from Asia, February 14, was also Lunar New Year, celebrated in multiple countries.

== Eclipse details ==
Shown below are two tables displaying details about this particular solar eclipse. The first table outlines times at which the Moon's penumbra or umbra attains the specific parameter, and the second table describes various other parameters pertaining to this eclipse.

February 14, 1915 Solar Eclipse Times
Event	Time (UTC)
First Penumbral External Contact	1915 February 14 at 01:41:50.2 UTC
First Umbral External Contact	1915 February 14 at 02:43:23.8 UTC
First Central Line	1915 February 14 at 02:44:33.6 UTC
Greatest Duration	1915 February 14 at 02:44:33.6 UTC
First Umbral Internal Contact	1915 February 14 at 02:45:43.5 UTC
First Penumbral Internal Contact	1915 February 14 at 03:49:42.8 UTC
Equatorial Conjunction	1915 February 14 at 04:22:46.6 UTC
Ecliptic Conjunction	1915 February 14 at 04:31:05.1 UTC
Greatest Eclipse	1915 February 14 at 04:33:20.0 UTC
Last Penumbral Internal Contact	1915 February 14 at 05:17:11.0 UTC
Last Umbral Internal Contact	1915 February 14 at 06:21:01.1 UTC
Last Central Line	1915 February 14 at 06:22:13.8 UTC
Last Umbral External Contact	1915 February 14 at 06:23:26.5 UTC
Last Penumbral External Contact	1915 February 14 at 07:25:00.5 UTC

February 14, 1915 Solar Eclipse Parameters
Parameter	Value
Eclipse Magnitude	0.97890
Eclipse Obscuration	0.95825
Gamma	−0.20238
Sun Right Ascension	21h46m51.7s
Sun Declination	-13°23'30.7"
Sun Semi-Diameter	16'11.7"
Sun Equatorial Horizontal Parallax	08.9"
Moon Right Ascension	21h47m11.9s
Moon Declination	-13°33'58.6"
Moon Semi-Diameter	15'36.4"
Moon Equatorial Horizontal Parallax	0°57'16.6"
ΔT	17.3 s

== Eclipse season ==
This eclipse is part of an eclipse season, a period, roughly every six months, when eclipses occur. Only two (or occasionally three) eclipse seasons occur each year, and each season lasts about 35 days and repeats just short of six months (173 days) later; thus two full eclipse seasons always occur each year. Either two or three eclipses happen each eclipse season. In the sequence below, each eclipse is separated by a fortnight. The first and last eclipse in this sequence is separated by one synodic month.

Eclipse season of January–March 1915
January 31 Descending node (full moon)	February 14 Ascending node (new moon)	March 1 Descending node (full moon)
Penumbral lunar eclipse Lunar Saros 103	Annular solar eclipse Solar Saros 129	Penumbral lunar eclipse Lunar Saros 141

== Related eclipses ==
=== Eclipses in 1915 ===
- A penumbral lunar eclipse on January 31.
- An annular solar eclipse on February 14.
- A penumbral lunar eclipse on March 1.
- A penumbral lunar eclipse on July 26.
- An annular solar eclipse on August 10.
- A penumbral lunar eclipse on August 24.

=== Metonic ===
- Preceded by: Solar eclipse of April 28, 1911
- Followed by: Solar eclipse of December 3, 1918

=== Tzolkinex ===
- Preceded by: Solar eclipse of January 3, 1908
- Followed by: Solar eclipse of March 28, 1922

=== Half-Saros ===
- Preceded by: Lunar eclipse of February 9, 1906
- Followed by: Lunar eclipse of February 20, 1924

=== Tritos ===
- Preceded by: Solar eclipse of March 17, 1904
- Followed by: Solar eclipse of January 14, 1926

=== Solar Saros 129 ===
- Preceded by: Solar eclipse of February 1, 1897
- Followed by: Solar eclipse of February 24, 1933

=== Inex ===
- Preceded by: Solar eclipse of March 5, 1886
- Followed by: Solar eclipse of January 25, 1944

=== Triad ===
- Preceded by: Solar eclipse of April 14, 1828
- Followed by: Solar eclipse of December 14, 2001

=== Solar eclipses of 1913–1917 ===
This eclipse is a member of a semester series. An eclipse in a semester series of solar eclipses repeats approximately every 177 days and 4 hours (a semester) at alternating nodes of the Moon's orbit.

The partial solar eclipses on April 6, 1913 and September 30, 1913 occur in the previous lunar year eclipse set, and the solar eclipses on December 24, 1916 (partial), June 19, 1917 (partial), and December 14, 1917 (annular) occur in the next lunar year eclipse set.

Solar eclipse series sets from 1913 to 1917
Descending node			Ascending node		
Saros	Map	Gamma	Saros	Map	Gamma
114	August 31, 1913 Partial	1.4512	119	February 25, 1914 Annular	−0.9416
124	August 21, 1914 Total	0.7655	129	February 14, 1915 Annular	−0.2024
134	August 10, 1915 Annular	0.0124	139	February 3, 1916 Total	0.4987
144	July 30, 1916 Annular	−0.7709	149	January 23, 1917 Partial	1.1508
154	July 19, 1917 Partial	−1.5101			

=== Saros 129 ===
This eclipse is a part of Saros series 129, repeating every 18 years, 11 days, and containing 80 events. The series started with a partial solar eclipse on October 3, 1103. It contains annular eclipses from May 6, 1464 through March 18, 1969; hybrid eclipses from March 29, 1987 through April 20, 2023; and total eclipses from April 30, 2041 through July 26, 2185. The series ends at member 80 as a partial eclipse on February 21, 2528. Its eclipses are tabulated in three columns; every third eclipse in the same column is one exeligmos apart, so they all cast shadows over approximately the same parts of the Earth.

The longest duration of annularity was produced by member 34 at 5 minutes, 10 seconds on October 4, 1698, and the longest duration of totality will be produced by member 58 at 3 minutes, 43 seconds on June 25, 2131. All eclipses in this series occur at the Moon’s ascending node of orbit.

Series members 40–61 occur between 1801 and 2200:
40	41	42
December 10, 1806	December 20, 1824	December 31, 1842
43	44	45
January 11, 1861	January 22, 1879	February 1, 1897
46	47	48
February 14, 1915	February 24, 1933	March 7, 1951
49	50	51
March 18, 1969	March 29, 1987	April 8, 2005
52	53	54
April 20, 2023	April 30, 2041	May 11, 2059
55	56	57
May 22, 2077	June 2, 2095	June 13, 2113
58	59	60
June 25, 2131	July 5, 2149	July 16, 2167
61
July 26, 2185

=== Metonic series ===
The metonic series repeats eclipses every 19 years (6939.69 days), lasting about 5 cycles. Eclipses occur in nearly the same calendar date. In addition, the octon subseries repeats 1/5 of that or every 3.8 years (1387.94 days). All eclipses in this table occur at the Moon's ascending node.

22 eclipse events between December 2, 1880 and July 9, 1964
December 2–3	September 20–21	July 9–10	April 26–28	February 13–14
111	113	115	117	119
December 2, 1880		July 9, 1888	April 26, 1892	February 13, 1896
121	123	125	127	129
December 3, 1899	September 21, 1903	July 10, 1907	April 28, 1911	February 14, 1915
131	133	135	137	139
December 3, 1918	September 21, 1922	July 9, 1926	April 28, 1930	February 14, 1934
141	143	145	147	149
December 2, 1937	September 21, 1941	July 9, 1945	April 28, 1949	February 14, 1953
151	153	155		
December 2, 1956	September 20, 1960	July 9, 1964		

=== Tritos series ===
This eclipse is a part of a tritos cycle, repeating at alternating nodes every 135 synodic months (≈ 3986.63 days, or 11 years minus 1 month). Their appearance and longitude are irregular due to a lack of synchronization with the anomalistic month (period of perigee), but groupings of 3 tritos cycles (≈ 33 years minus 3 months) come close (≈ 434.044 anomalistic months), so eclipses are similar in these groupings.

Series members between 1801 and 2200
December 21, 1805 (Saros 119)	November 19, 1816 (Saros 120)	October 20, 1827 (Saros 121)	September 18, 1838 (Saros 122)	August 18, 1849 (Saros 123)
July 18, 1860 (Saros 124)	June 18, 1871 (Saros 125)	May 17, 1882 (Saros 126)	April 16, 1893 (Saros 127)	March 17, 1904 (Saros 128)
February 14, 1915 (Saros 129)	January 14, 1926 (Saros 130)	December 13, 1936 (Saros 131)	November 12, 1947 (Saros 132)	October 12, 1958 (Saros 133)
September 11, 1969 (Saros 134)	August 10, 1980 (Saros 135)	July 11, 1991 (Saros 136)	June 10, 2002 (Saros 137)	May 10, 2013 (Saros 138)
April 8, 2024 (Saros 139)	March 9, 2035 (Saros 140)	February 5, 2046 (Saros 141)	January 5, 2057 (Saros 142)	December 6, 2067 (Saros 143)
November 4, 2078 (Saros 144)	October 4, 2089 (Saros 145)	September 4, 2100 (Saros 146)	August 4, 2111 (Saros 147)	July 4, 2122 (Saros 148)
June 3, 2133 (Saros 149)	May 3, 2144 (Saros 150)	April 2, 2155 (Saros 151)	March 2, 2166 (Saros 152)	January 29, 2177 (Saros 153)
December 29, 2187 (Saros 154)	November 28, 2198 (Saros 155)			

=== Inex series ===
This eclipse is a part of the long period inex cycle, repeating at alternating nodes, every 358 synodic months (≈ 10,571.95 days, or 29 years minus 20 days). Their appearance and longitude are irregular due to a lack of synchronization with the anomalistic month (period of perigee). However, groupings of 3 inex cycles (≈ 87 years minus 2 months) comes close (≈ 1,151.02 anomalistic months), so eclipses are similar in these groupings.

Series members between 1801 and 2200
April 14, 1828 (Saros 126)	March 25, 1857 (Saros 127)	March 5, 1886 (Saros 128)
February 14, 1915 (Saros 129)	January 25, 1944 (Saros 130)	January 4, 1973 (Saros 131)
December 14, 2001 (Saros 132)	November 25, 2030 (Saros 133)	November 5, 2059 (Saros 134)
October 14, 2088 (Saros 135)	September 26, 2117 (Saros 136)	September 6, 2146 (Saros 137)
August 16, 2175 (Saros 138)		
