= Solar eclipse of August 21, 1914 =

Total eclipse

- Total eclipse
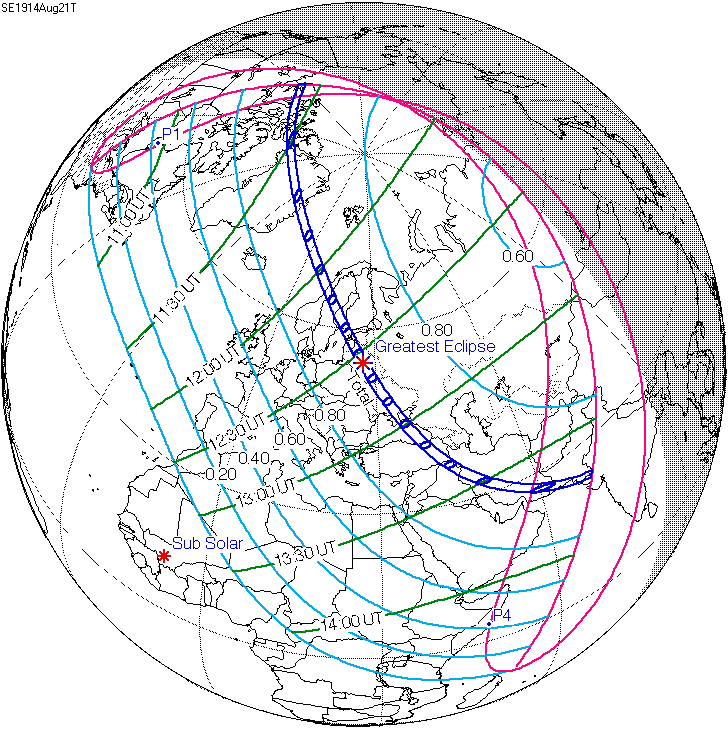
- Map
- Gamma: 0.7655
- Magnitude: 1.0328

Maximum eclipse
- Duration: 134 s (2 min 14 s)
- Coordinates: 54.5°N 27.1°E
- Max. width of band: 170 km (110 mi)

Times (UTC)
- Greatest eclipse: 12:34:27

References
- Saros: 124 (49 of 73)
- Catalog # (SE5000): 9314

A total solar eclipse occurred at the Moon's descending node of orbit on Friday, August 21, 1914, with a magnitude of 1.0328. A solar eclipse occurs when the Moon passes between Earth and the Sun, thereby totally or partly obscuring the image of the Sun for a viewer on Earth. A total solar eclipse occurs when the Moon's apparent diameter is larger than the Sun's, blocking all direct sunlight, turning day into darkness. Totality occurs in a narrow path across Earth's surface, with the partial solar eclipse visible over a surrounding region thousands of kilometres wide. Occurring about 2.7 days before perigee (on August 24, 1914, at 6:30 UTC), the Moon's apparent diameter was larger.

The totality of this eclipse was visible from northern Canada, Greenland, Norway, Sweden, Russian Empire (the parts now belonging to Åland, Finland, Estonia, Latvia, Lithuania, Belarus, Ukraine and Russia, including cities of Riga, Minsk, Kiev and northeastern part of Vilnius), Ottoman Empire (the parts now belonging to Turkey, northeastern tip of Syria and northern Iraq), Persia and British Raj (the parts now belonging to Pakistan and western tip of India). A partial eclipse was visible for parts of northeast North America, Europe, North Africa, East Africa, and the Middle East. It was the first of four total solar eclipses that would be seen from Sweden during the next 40 years. This total solar eclipse occurred in the same calendar date as 2017, but at the opposite node.

Several astronomers were setting up to observe the eclipse, in part as an attempt to confirm Albert Einstein's theory of general relativity. However, due to the onset of World War I as well as cloud cover, these experiments were unsuccessful.

== Observations ==
A number of observatories sent expeditions to Russia to observe the eclipse including those from Argentina, the United Kingdom, Germany, Russia, and the United States. The expeditions led by Charles Dillon Perrine of the Argentine National Observatory, Erwin Finlay-Freundlich of the Berlin-Babelsberg Observatory, Germany, and William W. Campbell of the Lick Observatory, California, included in their programs the second attempt to verify the general relativity theory of Albert Einstein. (Perrine had made the first attempt at the 1912 solar eclipse in Brazil.) However, World War I broke out and Freundlich and his equipment were interned in Russia, unable to carry out the necessary measurements. C. D. Perrine and W. W. Campbell, from neutral countries, Argentina and the United States, were permitted to continue with their plans, but clouds obscured the eclipse. Perrine was able to obtain one photograph of the eclipse but the thin cloud cover was enough to obscure star locations necessary to test Einstein's theory.

== Eclipse details ==
Shown below are two tables displaying details about this particular solar eclipse. The first table outlines times at which the Moon's penumbra or umbra attains the specific parameter, and the second table describes various other parameters pertaining to this eclipse.

August 21, 1914 Solar Eclipse Times
Event	Time (UTC)
First Penumbral External Contact	1914 August 21 at 10:12:09.6 UTC
First Umbral External Contact	1914 August 21 at 11:25:24.7 UTC
First Central Line	1914 August 21 at 11:26:20.7 UTC
First Umbral Internal Contact	1914 August 21 at 11:27:17.1 UTC
Equatorial Conjunction	1914 August 21 at 11:55:06.4 UTC
Ecliptic Conjunction	1914 August 21 at 12:26:24.1 UTC
Greatest Eclipse	1914 August 21 at 12:34:27.1 UTC
Greatest Duration	1914 August 21 at 12:34:52.8 UTC
Last Umbral Internal Contact	1914 August 21 at 13:41:59.4 UTC
Last Central Line	1914 August 21 at 13:42:58.0 UTC
Last Umbral External Contact	1914 August 21 at 13:43:56.1 UTC
Last Penumbral External Contact	1914 August 21 at 14:56:55.9 UTC

August 21, 1914 Solar Eclipse Parameters
Parameter	Value
Eclipse Magnitude	1.03276
Eclipse Obscuration	1.06658
Gamma	0.76546
Sun Right Ascension	09h59m08.5s
Sun Declination	+12°18'56.8"
Sun Semi-Diameter	15'48.7"
Sun Equatorial Horizontal Parallax	08.7"
Moon Right Ascension	10h00m29.2s
Moon Declination	+12°59'43.6"
Moon Semi-Diameter	16'09.7"
Moon Equatorial Horizontal Parallax	0°59'18.8"
ΔT	16.7 s

== Eclipse season ==
This eclipse is part of an eclipse season, a period, roughly every six months, when eclipses occur. Only two (or occasionally three) eclipse seasons occur each year, and each season lasts about 35 days and repeats just short of six months (173 days) later; thus two full eclipse seasons always occur each year. Either two or three eclipses happen each eclipse season. In the sequence below, each eclipse is separated by a fortnight.

Eclipse season of August–September 1914
August 21 Descending node (new moon)	September 4 Ascending node (full moon)
Total solar eclipse Solar Saros 124	Partial lunar eclipse Lunar Saros 136

== Related eclipses ==
=== Eclipses in 1914 ===
- An annular solar eclipse on February 25.
- A partial lunar eclipse on March 12.
- A total solar eclipse on August 21.
- A partial lunar eclipse on September 4.

=== Metonic ===
- Preceded by: Solar eclipse of November 2, 1910
- Followed by: Solar eclipse of June 8, 1918

=== Tzolkinex ===
- Preceded by: Solar eclipse of July 10, 1907
- Followed by: Solar eclipse of October 1, 1921

=== Half-Saros ===
- Preceded by: Lunar eclipse of August 15, 1905
- Followed by: Lunar eclipse of August 26, 1923

=== Tritos ===
- Preceded by: Solar eclipse of September 21, 1903
- Followed by: Solar eclipse of July 20, 1925

=== Solar Saros 124 ===
- Preceded by: Solar eclipse of August 9, 1896
- Followed by: Solar eclipse of August 31, 1932

=== Inex ===
- Preceded by: Solar eclipse of September 8, 1885
- Followed by: Solar eclipse of August 1, 1943

=== Triad ===
- Preceded by: Solar eclipse of October 20, 1827
- Followed by: Solar eclipse of June 21, 2001

=== Solar eclipses of 1913–1917 ===
This eclipse is a member of a semester series. An eclipse in a semester series of solar eclipses repeats approximately every 177 days and 4 hours (a semester) at alternating nodes of the Moon's orbit.

The partial solar eclipses on April 6, 1913 and September 30, 1913 occur in the previous lunar year eclipse set, and the solar eclipses on December 24, 1916 (partial), June 19, 1917 (partial), and December 14, 1917 (annular) occur in the next lunar year eclipse set.

Solar eclipse series sets from 1913 to 1917
Descending node			Ascending node		
Saros	Map	Gamma	Saros	Map	Gamma
114	August 31, 1913 Partial	1.4512	119	February 25, 1914 Annular	−0.9416
124	August 21, 1914 Total	0.7655	129	February 14, 1915 Annular	−0.2024
134	August 10, 1915 Annular	0.0124	139	February 3, 1916 Total	0.4987
144	July 30, 1916 Annular	−0.7709	149	January 23, 1917 Partial	1.1508
154	July 19, 1917 Partial	−1.5101			

=== Saros 124 ===
This eclipse is a part of Saros series 124, repeating every 18 years, 11 days, and containing 73 events. The series started with a partial solar eclipse on March 6, 1049. It contains total eclipses from June 12, 1211 through September 22, 1968, and a hybrid eclipse on October 3, 1986. There are no annular eclipses in this set. The series ends at member 73 as a partial eclipse on May 11, 2347. Its eclipses are tabulated in three columns; every third eclipse in the same column is one exeligmos apart, so they all cast shadows over approximately the same parts of the Earth.

The longest duration of totality was produced by member 39 at 5 minutes, 46 seconds on May 3, 1734. All eclipses in this series occur at the Moon’s descending node of orbit.

Series members 43–64 occur between 1801 and 2200:
43	44	45
June 16, 1806	June 26, 1824	July 8, 1842
46	47	48
July 18, 1860	July 29, 1878	August 9, 1896
49	50	51
August 21, 1914	August 31, 1932	September 12, 1950
52	53	54
September 22, 1968	October 3, 1986	October 14, 2004
55	56	57
October 25, 2022	November 4, 2040	November 16, 2058
58	59	60
November 26, 2076	December 7, 2094	December 19, 2112
61	62	63
December 30, 2130	January 9, 2149	January 21, 2167
64
January 31, 2185

=== Metonic series ===
The metonic series repeats eclipses every 19 years (6939.69 days), lasting about 5 cycles. Eclipses occur in nearly the same calendar date. In addition, the octon subseries repeats 1/5 of that or every 3.8 years (1387.94 days). All eclipses in this table occur at the Moon's descending node.

22 eclipse events between March 27, 1884 and August 20, 1971
March 27–29	January 14	November 1–2	August 20–21	June 8
108	110	112	114	116
March 27, 1884			August 20, 1895	June 8, 1899
118	120	122	124	126
March 29, 1903	January 14, 1907	November 2, 1910	August 21, 1914	June 8, 1918
128	130	132	134	136
March 28, 1922	January 14, 1926	November 1, 1929	August 21, 1933	June 8, 1937
138	140	142	144	146
March 27, 1941	January 14, 1945	November 1, 1948	August 20, 1952	June 8, 1956
148	150	152	154	
March 27, 1960	January 14, 1964	November 2, 1967	August 20, 1971	

=== Tritos series ===
This eclipse is a part of a tritos cycle, repeating at alternating nodes every 135 synodic months (≈ 3986.63 days, or 11 years minus 1 month). Their appearance and longitude are irregular due to a lack of synchronization with the anomalistic month (period of perigee), but groupings of 3 tritos cycles (≈ 33 years minus 3 months) come close (≈ 434.044 anomalistic months), so eclipses are similar in these groupings.

Series members between 1801 and 2200
June 26, 1805 (Saros 114)	May 27, 1816 (Saros 115)	April 26, 1827 (Saros 116)	March 25, 1838 (Saros 117)	February 23, 1849 (Saros 118)
January 23, 1860 (Saros 119)	December 22, 1870 (Saros 120)	November 21, 1881 (Saros 121)	October 20, 1892 (Saros 122)	September 21, 1903 (Saros 123)
August 21, 1914 (Saros 124)	July 20, 1925 (Saros 125)	June 19, 1936 (Saros 126)	May 20, 1947 (Saros 127)	April 19, 1958 (Saros 128)
March 18, 1969 (Saros 129)	February 16, 1980 (Saros 130)	January 15, 1991 (Saros 131)	December 14, 2001 (Saros 132)	November 13, 2012 (Saros 133)
October 14, 2023 (Saros 134)	September 12, 2034 (Saros 135)	August 12, 2045 (Saros 136)	July 12, 2056 (Saros 137)	June 11, 2067 (Saros 138)
May 11, 2078 (Saros 139)	April 10, 2089 (Saros 140)	March 10, 2100 (Saros 141)	February 8, 2111 (Saros 142)	January 8, 2122 (Saros 143)
December 7, 2132 (Saros 144)	November 7, 2143 (Saros 145)	October 7, 2154 (Saros 146)	September 5, 2165 (Saros 147)	August 4, 2176 (Saros 148)
July 6, 2187 (Saros 149)	June 4, 2198 (Saros 150)			

=== Inex series ===
This eclipse is a part of the long period inex cycle, repeating at alternating nodes, every 358 synodic months (≈ 10,571.95 days, or 29 years minus 20 days). Their appearance and longitude are irregular due to a lack of synchronization with the anomalistic month (period of perigee). However, groupings of 3 inex cycles (≈ 87 years minus 2 months) comes close (≈ 1,151.02 anomalistic months), so eclipses are similar in these groupings.

Series members between 1801 and 2200
October 20, 1827 (Saros 121)	September 29, 1856 (Saros 122)	September 8, 1885 (Saros 123)
August 21, 1914 (Saros 124)	August 1, 1943 (Saros 125)	July 10, 1972 (Saros 126)
June 21, 2001 (Saros 127)	June 1, 2030 (Saros 128)	May 11, 2059 (Saros 129)
April 21, 2088 (Saros 130)	April 2, 2117 (Saros 131)	March 12, 2146 (Saros 132)
February 21, 2175 (Saros 133)		
