= Solar eclipse of December 14, 2001 =

21st-century annular solar eclipse

- Annular eclipse
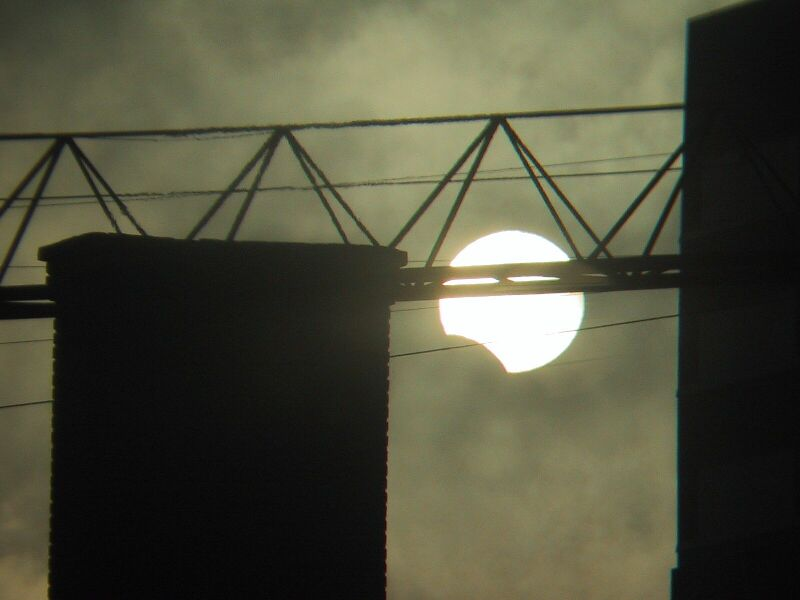
- Partial from Minneapolis, Minnesota

- Map
- Gamma: 0.4089
- Magnitude: 0.9681

Maximum eclipse
- Duration: 233 s (3 min 53 s)
- Coordinates: 0.6°N 130.7°W
- Max. width of band: 126 km (78 mi)

Times (UTC)
- Greatest eclipse: 20:53:01

References
- Saros: 132 (45 of 71)
- Catalog # (SE5000): 9512

An annular solar eclipse occurred at the Moon's descending node of orbit on Friday, December 14, 2001, with a magnitude of 0.9681. A solar eclipse occurs when the Moon passes between Earth and the Sun, thereby totally or partly obscuring the image of the Sun for a viewer on Earth. An annular solar eclipse occurs when the Moon's apparent diameter is smaller than the Sun's, blocking most of the Sun's light and causing the Sun to look like an annulus (ring). An annular eclipse appears as a partial eclipse over a region of the Earth thousands of kilometres wide. The Moon's apparent diameter was near the average diameter because it occurred 7.9 days after perigee (on December 6, 2001, at 22:40 UTC) and 6.7 days before apogee (on December 21, 2001, at 13:00 UTC).

Annularity was visible across the Pacific Ocean, southern Costa Rica, northern Nicaragua and San Andrés Island, Colombia. The central shadow passed just south of Hawaii in early morning and ended over Central America near sunset. A partial eclipse was visible for parts of North America, Central America, northwestern South America, and Hawaii.

== Observation ==
Animated path

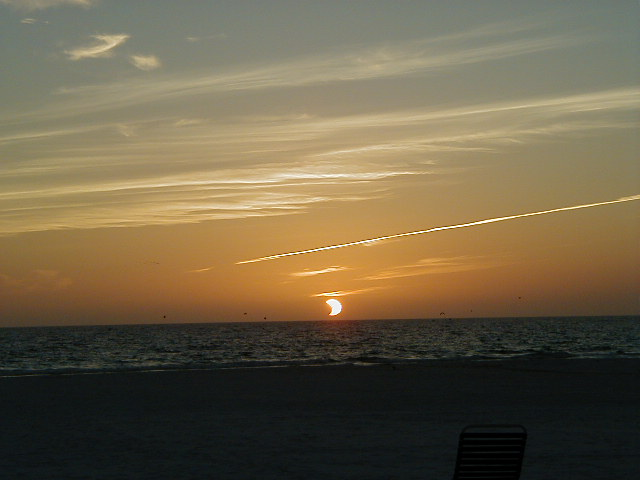
Partial from Siesta Key, Florida

The path of annularity was mostly on the sea, so observers were concentrated in Central America, the only land covered by the path, especially in Costa Rica with the largest area covered by the path and highest solar zenith angle. However, it was cloudy or rainy in many parts of the country during the eclipse, and only a few observers saw the annular eclipse. The International Occultation Timing Association made up of scientists from different countries planned to measure the diameter of the Sun with Baily's beads that appeared at the moment of the second and third contacts in Santa Rosa National Park on the northern edge of the path of annularity, but failed. A team of professors from the University of Costa Rica and abroad traveled to Ostional Mixed Wildlife Refuge, kilometres north of Nosara. The Sun could be seen through the clouds after the eclipse started, but it was completely clouded out when 80% was blocked by the Moon. All the stages after that, including the annularity, could not be seen.

Coincidentally, the 2001 Geminids peaked in the early morning of December 14 local time, less than 24 hours before the annular solar eclipse.

== Eclipse timing ==
=== Places experiencing annular eclipse ===
Solar Eclipse of December 14, 2001 (Local Times)
Country or territory	City or place	Start of partial eclipse	Start of annular eclipse	Maximum eclipse	End of annular eclipse	End of partial eclipse	Duration of annularity (min:s)	Duration of eclipse (hr:min)	Maximum coverage
Costa Rica	Liberia	15:11:39	16:30:42	16:32:02	16:33:22	17:21:53 (sunset)	2:40	2:10	91.50%
Costa Rica	Alajuela	15:13:44	16:31:57	16:32:55	16:33:53	17:18:05 (sunset)	1:56	2:04	91.44%
Costa Rica	San José	15:13:58	16:32:39	16:33:00	16:33:23	17:17:42 (sunset)	0:44	2:04	91.44%
Colombia	San Andrés	16:16:17	17:32:45	17:33:13	17:33:41	18:03:25 (sunset)	0:56	1:47	91.27%

=== Places experiencing partial eclipse ===
Solar Eclipse of December 14, 2001 (Local Times)
Country or territory	City or place	Start of partial eclipse	Maximum eclipse	End of partial eclipse	Duration of eclipse (hr:min)	Maximum coverage
United States Minor Outlying Islands	Midway Atoll	07:33:23 (sunrise)	08:11:10	09:27:12	1:54	90.45%
United States	Honolulu	08:08:06	09:26:54	11:00:47	2:53	78.80%
Kiribati	Kiritimati (Note: The times listed for this location occur on December 15, 2001, local time.)	08:20:34	09:39:13	11:13:21	2:53	54.61%
French Polynesia	Taioha'e	09:26:14	11:03:25	12:49:54	3:24	53.50%
United States	Washington, D.C.	16:12:58	16:43:36	16:46:51 (sunset)	0:34	15.76%
Clipperton Island	Clipperton Island	12:11:08	13:58:29	15:26:12	3:15	65.93%
Dominican Republic	Santo Domingo	17:24:17	18:03:00	18:05:31 (sunset)	0:41	42.30%
Turks and Caicos Islands	Cockburn Harbour	16:21:47	17:03:27	17:06:02 (sunset)	0:44	44.50%
Venezuela	Caracas	17:31:16	18:05:29	18:07:55 (sunset)	0:37	35.06%
Turks and Caicos Islands	Providenciales	16:21:13	17:05:45	17:08:21 (sunset)	0:47	47.94%
Curaçao	Willemstad	17:28:47	18:10:42	18:13:14 (sunset)	0:44	46.96%
Haiti	Port-au-Prince	16:22:43	17:12:27	17:14:59 (sunset)	0:52	58.20%
Mexico	Mexico City	14:44:53	16:12:54	17:26:20	2:41	48.92%
Aruba	Oranjestad	17:27:45	18:14:25	18:16:52 (sunset)	0:49	54.34%
Bahamas	Nassau	16:16:31	17:19:16	17:21:57 (sunset)	1:05	56.96%
Venezuela	Maracaibo	17:27:45	18:23:55	18:26:33 (sunset)	0:59	66.41%
Cuba	Havana	16:12:34	17:26:24	17:46:04 (sunset)	1:34	58.39%
Belize	Belmopan	15:04:59	16:26:31	17:23:11 (sunset)	2:18	67.79%
Guatemala	Guatemala City	15:02:11	16:26:32	17:35:07 (sunset)	2:33	73.73%
El Salvador	San Salvador	15:04:41	16:28:09	17:31:25 (sunset)	2:27	78.45%
Honduras	Tegucigalpa	15:07:57	16:29:28	17:22:44 (sunset)	2:15	79.89%
Cayman Islands	George Town	16:14:30	17:29:47	17:49:42 (sunset)	1:35	71.35%
United States Minor Outlying Islands	Galápagos Islands	15:09:16	16:30:22	17:38:37	2:29	64.34%
Nicaragua	Managua	15:09:54	16:30:58	17:22:28 (sunset)	2:13	87.39%
Jamaica	Kingston	16:19:29	17:31:18	17:33:50 (sunset)	1:14	81.60%
Costa Rica	Limón	15:15:29	16:33:31	17:13:23 (sunset)	1:58	90.68%
Panama	Panama City	16:20:39	17:35:09	18:01:06 (sunset)	1:40	82.71%
Colombia	Barranquilla	16:24:45	17:35:38	17:38:42 (sunset)	1:14	82.33%
Ecuador	Quito	16:28:04	17:36:07	18:12:59 (sunset)	1:45	50.82%
Colombia	Bogotá	16:29:41	17:36:56	17:46:57 (sunset)	1:17	60.14%

== Gallery ==
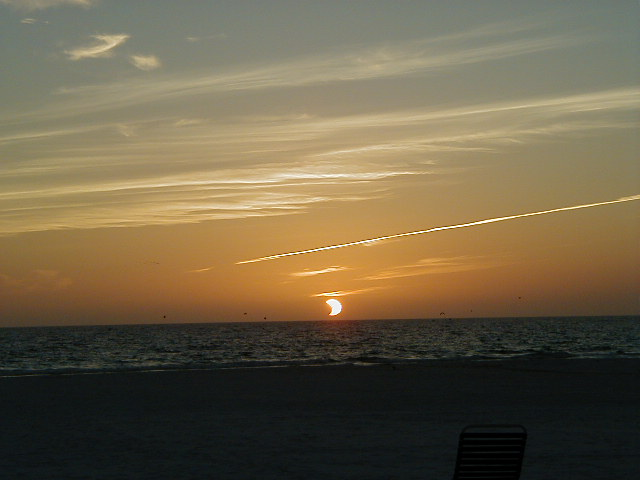
Partial from Siesta Key, Florida at sunset

== Eclipse season ==
This eclipse is part of an eclipse season, a period, roughly every six months, when eclipses occur. Only two (or occasionally three) eclipse seasons occur each year, and each season lasts about 35 days and repeats just short of six months (173 days) later; thus two full eclipse seasons always occur each year. Either two or three eclipses happen each eclipse season. In the sequence below, each eclipse is separated by a fortnight.

Eclipse season of December 2001
December 14 Descending node (new moon)	December 30 Ascending node (full moon)
Annular solar eclipse Solar Saros 132	Penumbral lunar eclipse Lunar Saros 144

== Related eclipses ==
=== Eclipses in 2001 ===
- A total lunar eclipse on January 9.
- A total solar eclipse on June 21.
- A partial lunar eclipse on July 5.
- An annular solar eclipse on December 14.
- A penumbral lunar eclipse on December 30.

=== Metonic ===
- Preceded by: Solar eclipse of February 26, 1998
- Followed by: Solar eclipse of October 3, 2005

=== Tzolkinex ===
- Preceded by: Solar eclipse of November 3, 1994
- Followed by: Solar eclipse of January 26, 2009

=== Half-Saros ===
- Preceded by: Lunar eclipse of December 9, 1992
- Followed by: Lunar eclipse of December 21, 2010

=== Tritos ===
- Preceded by: Solar eclipse of January 15, 1991
- Followed by: Solar eclipse of November 13, 2012

=== Solar Saros 132 ===
- Preceded by: Solar eclipse of December 4, 1983
- Followed by: Solar eclipse of December 26, 2019

=== Inex ===
- Preceded by: Solar eclipse of January 4, 1973
- Followed by: Solar eclipse of November 25, 2030

=== Triad ===
- Preceded by: Solar eclipse of February 14, 1915
- Followed by: Solar eclipse of October 14, 2088

=== Solar eclipses of 2000–2003 ===
This eclipse is a member of a semester series. An eclipse in a semester series of solar eclipses repeats approximately every 177 days and 4 hours (a semester) at alternating nodes of the Moon's orbit.

The partial solar eclipses on February 5, 2000 and July 31, 2000 occur in the previous lunar year eclipse set.

Solar eclipse series sets from 2000 to 2003
Ascending node			Descending node		
Saros	Map	Gamma	Saros	Map	Gamma
117	July 1, 2000 Partial	−1.28214	122 Partial projection in Minneapolis, MN, USA	December 25, 2000 Partial	1.13669
127 Totality in Lusaka, Zambia	June 21, 2001 Total	−0.57013	132 Partial in Minneapolis, MN, USA	December 14, 2001 Annular	0.40885
137 Partial in Los Angeles, CA, USA	June 10, 2002 Annular	0.19933	142 Totality in Woomera, South Australia	December 4, 2002 Total	−0.30204
147 Annularity in Culloden, Scotland	May 31, 2003 Annular	0.99598	152	November 23, 2003 Total	−0.96381

=== Saros 132 ===
This eclipse is a part of Saros series 132, repeating every 18 years, 11 days, and containing 71 events. The series started with a partial solar eclipse on August 13, 1208. It contains annular eclipses from March 17, 1569 through March 12, 2146; hybrid eclipses on March 23, 2164 and April 3, 2182; and total eclipses from April 14, 2200 through June 19, 2308. The series ends at member 71 as a partial eclipse on September 25, 2470. Its eclipses are tabulated in three columns; every third eclipse in the same column is one exeligmos apart, so they all cast shadows over approximately the same parts of the Earth.

The longest duration of annularity was produced by member 25 at 6 minutes, 56 seconds on May 9, 1641, and the longest duration of totality will be produced by member 61 at 2 minutes, 14 seconds on June 8, 2290. All eclipses in this series occur at the Moon’s descending node of orbit.

Series members 34–56 occur between 1801 and 2200:
34	35	36
August 17, 1803	August 27, 1821	September 7, 1839
37	38	39
September 18, 1857	September 29, 1875	October 9, 1893
40	41	42
October 22, 1911	November 1, 1929	November 12, 1947
43	44	45
November 23, 1965	December 4, 1983	December 14, 2001
46	47	48
December 26, 2019	January 5, 2038	January 16, 2056
49	50	51
January 27, 2074	February 7, 2092	February 18, 2110
52	53	54
March 1, 2128	March 12, 2146	March 23, 2164
55	56	
April 3, 2182	April 14, 2200	

=== Metonic series ===
The metonic series repeats eclipses every 19 years (6939.69 days), lasting about 5 cycles. Eclipses occur in nearly the same calendar date. In addition, the octon subseries repeats 1/5 of that or every 3.8 years (1387.94 days). All eclipses in this table occur at the Moon's descending node.

21 eclipse events between July 22, 1971 and July 22, 2047
July 22	May 9–11	February 26–27	December 14–15	October 2–3
116	118	120	122	124
July 22, 1971	May 11, 1975	February 26, 1979	December 15, 1982	October 3, 1986
126	128	130	132	134
July 22, 1990	May 10, 1994	February 26, 1998	December 14, 2001	October 3, 2005
136	138	140	142	144
July 22, 2009	May 10, 2013	February 26, 2017	December 14, 2020	October 2, 2024
146	148	150	152	154
July 22, 2028	May 9, 2032	February 27, 2036	December 15, 2039	October 3, 2043
156
July 22, 2047

=== Tritos series ===
This eclipse is a part of a tritos cycle, repeating at alternating nodes every 135 synodic months (≈ 3986.63 days, or 11 years minus 1 month). Their appearance and longitude are irregular due to a lack of synchronization with the anomalistic month (period of perigee), but groupings of 3 tritos cycles (≈ 33 years minus 3 months) come close (≈ 434.044 anomalistic months), so eclipses are similar in these groupings.

Series members between 1801 and 2200
June 26, 1805 (Saros 114)	May 27, 1816 (Saros 115)	April 26, 1827 (Saros 116)	March 25, 1838 (Saros 117)	February 23, 1849 (Saros 118)
January 23, 1860 (Saros 119)	December 22, 1870 (Saros 120)	November 21, 1881 (Saros 121)	October 20, 1892 (Saros 122)	September 21, 1903 (Saros 123)
August 21, 1914 (Saros 124)	July 20, 1925 (Saros 125)	June 19, 1936 (Saros 126)	May 20, 1947 (Saros 127)	April 19, 1958 (Saros 128)
March 18, 1969 (Saros 129)	February 16, 1980 (Saros 130)	January 15, 1991 (Saros 131)	December 14, 2001 (Saros 132)	November 13, 2012 (Saros 133)
October 14, 2023 (Saros 134)	September 12, 2034 (Saros 135)	August 12, 2045 (Saros 136)	July 12, 2056 (Saros 137)	June 11, 2067 (Saros 138)
May 11, 2078 (Saros 139)	April 10, 2089 (Saros 140)	March 10, 2100 (Saros 141)	February 8, 2111 (Saros 142)	January 8, 2122 (Saros 143)
December 7, 2132 (Saros 144)	November 7, 2143 (Saros 145)	October 7, 2154 (Saros 146)	September 5, 2165 (Saros 147)	August 4, 2176 (Saros 148)
July 6, 2187 (Saros 149)	June 4, 2198 (Saros 150)			

=== Inex series ===
This eclipse is a part of the long period inex cycle, repeating at alternating nodes, every 358 synodic months (≈ 10,571.95 days, or 29 years minus 20 days). Their appearance and longitude are irregular due to a lack of synchronization with the anomalistic month (period of perigee). However, groupings of 3 inex cycles (≈ 87 years minus 2 months) comes close (≈ 1,151.02 anomalistic months), so eclipses are similar in these groupings.

Series members between 1801 and 2200
April 14, 1828 (Saros 126)	March 25, 1857 (Saros 127)	March 5, 1886 (Saros 128)
February 14, 1915 (Saros 129)	January 25, 1944 (Saros 130)	January 4, 1973 (Saros 131)
December 14, 2001 (Saros 132)	November 25, 2030 (Saros 133)	November 5, 2059 (Saros 134)
October 14, 2088 (Saros 135)	September 26, 2117 (Saros 136)	September 6, 2146 (Saros 137)
August 16, 2175 (Saros 138)		
