= Solar eclipse of January 14, 1964 =

20th-century partial solar eclipse

- Partial eclipse
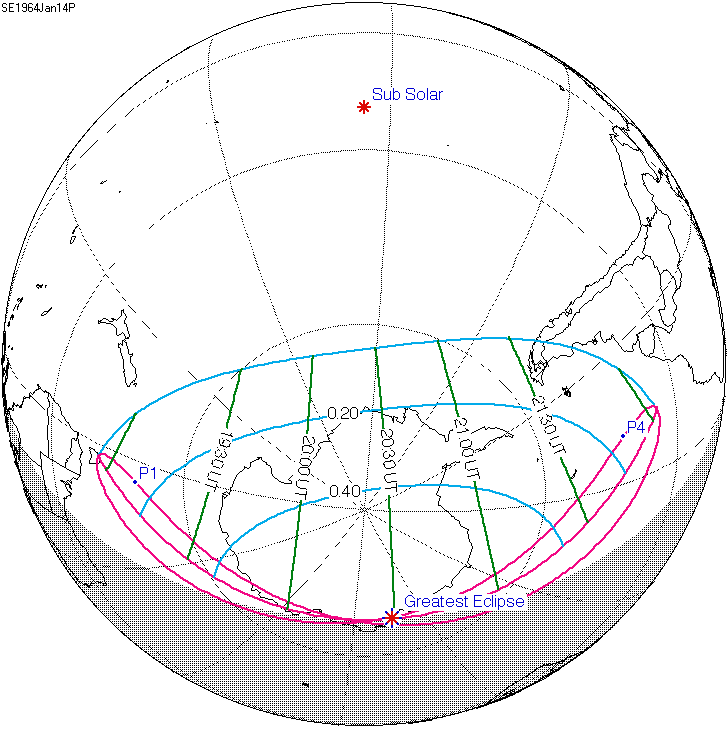
- Map
- Gamma: −1.2354
- Magnitude: 0.5591

Maximum eclipse
- Coordinates: 68.2°S 43.1°E

Times (UTC)
- Greatest eclipse: 20:30:08

References
- Saros: 150 (14 of 71)
- Catalog # (SE5000): 9428

A partial solar eclipse occurred at the Moon's descending node of orbit on Tuesday, January 14, 1964, with a magnitude of 0.5591. A solar eclipse occurs when the Moon passes between Earth and the Sun, thereby totally or partly obscuring the image of the Sun for a viewer on Earth. Partial solar eclipses occur in the polar regions of the Earth when the center of the Moon's shadow misses the Earth.

This was the first of four partial solar eclipses in 1964, with the others occurring on June 10, July 9, and December 4.

A partial eclipse was visible for parts of Antarctica and extreme southern South America.

== Eclipse details ==
Shown below are two tables displaying details about this particular solar eclipse. The first table outlines times at which the Moon's penumbra or umbra attains the specific parameter, and the second table describes various other parameters pertaining to this eclipse.

January 14, 1964 Solar Eclipse Times
Event	Time (UTC)
First Penumbral External Contact	1964 January 14 at 18:38:52.1 UTC
Equatorial Conjunction	1964 January 14 at 20:19:20.3 UTC
Greatest Eclipse	1964 January 14 at 20:30:08.2 UTC
Ecliptic Conjunction	1964 January 14 at 20:44:03.6 UTC
Last Penumbral External Contact	1964 January 14 at 22:21:24.3 UTC

January 14, 1964 Solar Eclipse Parameters
Parameter	Value
Eclipse Magnitude	0.55916
Eclipse Obscuration	0.44651
Gamma	−1.23541
Sun Right Ascension	19h42m19.5s
Sun Declination	-21°21'43.0"
Sun Semi-Diameter	16'15.6"
Sun Equatorial Horizontal Parallax	08.9"
Moon Right Ascension	19h42m41.8s
Moon Declination	-22°29'45.9"
Moon Semi-Diameter	15'05.5"
Moon Equatorial Horizontal Parallax	0°55'23.3"
ΔT	35.1 s

== Eclipse season ==
This eclipse is part of an eclipse season, a period, roughly every six months, when eclipses occur. Only two (or occasionally three) eclipse seasons occur each year, and each season lasts about 35 days and repeats just short of six months (173 days) later; thus two full eclipse seasons always occur each year. Either two or three eclipses happen each eclipse season. In the sequence below, each eclipse is separated by a fortnight.

Eclipse season of December 1963–January 1964
December 30 Ascending node (full moon)	January 14 Descending node (new moon)
Total lunar eclipse Lunar Saros 124	Partial solar eclipse Solar Saros 150

== Related eclipses ==
=== Eclipses in 1964 ===
- A partial solar eclipse on January 14.
- A partial solar eclipse on June 10.
- A total lunar eclipse on June 25.
- A partial solar eclipse on July 9.
- A partial solar eclipse on December 4.
- A total lunar eclipse on December 19.

=== Metonic ===
- Preceded by: Solar eclipse of March 27, 1960
- Followed by: Solar eclipse of November 2, 1967

=== Tzolkinex ===
- Preceded by: Solar eclipse of December 2, 1956
- Followed by: Solar eclipse of February 25, 1971

=== Half-Saros ===
- Preceded by: Lunar eclipse of January 8, 1955
- Followed by: Lunar eclipse of January 18, 1973

=== Tritos ===
- Preceded by: Solar eclipse of February 14, 1953
- Followed by: Solar eclipse of December 13, 1974

=== Solar Saros 150 ===
- Preceded by: Solar eclipse of January 3, 1946
- Followed by: Solar eclipse of January 25, 1982

=== Inex ===
- Preceded by: Solar eclipse of February 3, 1935
- Followed by: Solar eclipse of December 24, 1992

=== Triad ===
- Preceded by: Solar eclipse of March 15, 1877
- Followed by: Solar eclipse of November 14, 2050

=== Solar eclipses of 1961–1964 ===
This eclipse is a member of a semester series. An eclipse in a semester series of solar eclipses repeats approximately every 177 days and 4 hours (a semester) at alternating nodes of the Moon's orbit.

The partial solar eclipses on June 10, 1964 and December 4, 1964 occur in the next lunar year eclipse set.

Solar eclipse series sets from 1961 to 1964
Descending node			Ascending node		
Saros	Map	Gamma	Saros	Map	Gamma
120	February 15, 1961 Total	0.883	125	August 11, 1961 Annular	−0.8859
130	February 5, 1962 Total	0.2107	135	July 31, 1962 Annular	−0.113
140	January 25, 1963 Annular	−0.4898	145	July 20, 1963 Total	0.6571
150	January 14, 1964 Partial	−1.2354	155	July 9, 1964 Partial	1.3623

=== Saros 150 ===
This eclipse is a part of Saros series 150, repeating every 18 years, 11 days, and containing 71 events. The series started with a partial solar eclipse on August 24, 1729. It contains annular eclipses from April 22, 2126 through June 22, 2829. There are no hybrid or total eclipses in this set. The series ends at member 71 as a partial eclipse on September 29, 2991. Its eclipses are tabulated in three columns; every third eclipse in the same column is one exeligmos apart, so they all cast shadows over approximately the same parts of the Earth.

The longest duration of annularity will be produced by member 45 at 9 minutes, 58 seconds on December 19, 2522. All eclipses in this series occur at the Moon’s descending node of orbit.

Series members 5–27 occur between 1801 and 2200:
5	6	7
October 7, 1801	October 19, 1819	October 29, 1837
8	9	10
November 9, 1855	November 20, 1873	December 1, 1891
11	12	13
December 12, 1909	December 24, 1927	January 3, 1946
14	15	16
January 14, 1964	January 25, 1982	February 5, 2000
17	18	19
February 15, 2018	February 27, 2036	March 9, 2054
20	21	22
March 19, 2072	March 31, 2090	April 11, 2108
23	24	25
April 22, 2126	May 3, 2144	May 14, 2162
26	27	
May 24, 2180	June 4, 2198	

=== Metonic series ===
The metonic series repeats eclipses every 19 years (6939.69 days), lasting about 5 cycles. Eclipses occur in nearly the same calendar date. In addition, the octon subseries repeats 1/5 of that or every 3.8 years (1387.94 days). All eclipses in this table occur at the Moon's descending node.

22 eclipse events between March 27, 1884 and August 20, 1971
March 27–29	January 14	November 1–2	August 20–21	June 8
108	110	112	114	116
March 27, 1884			August 20, 1895	June 8, 1899
118	120	122	124	126
March 29, 1903	January 14, 1907	November 2, 1910	August 21, 1914	June 8, 1918
128	130	132	134	136
March 28, 1922	January 14, 1926	November 1, 1929	August 21, 1933	June 8, 1937
138	140	142	144	146
March 27, 1941	January 14, 1945	November 1, 1948	August 20, 1952	June 8, 1956
148	150	152	154	
March 27, 1960	January 14, 1964	November 2, 1967	August 20, 1971	

=== Tritos series ===
This eclipse is a part of a tritos cycle, repeating at alternating nodes every 135 synodic months (≈ 3986.63 days, or 11 years minus 1 month). Their appearance and longitude are irregular due to a lack of synchronization with the anomalistic month (period of perigee), but groupings of 3 tritos cycles (≈ 33 years minus 3 months) come close (≈ 434.044 anomalistic months), so eclipses are similar in these groupings.

The partial solar eclipse on November 4, 2116 (part of Saros 164) is also a part of this series but is not included in the table below.

Series members between 1801 and 2029
March 24, 1811 (Saros 136)	February 21, 1822 (Saros 137)	January 20, 1833 (Saros 138)	December 21, 1843 (Saros 139)	November 20, 1854 (Saros 140)
October 19, 1865 (Saros 141)	September 17, 1876 (Saros 142)	August 19, 1887 (Saros 143)	July 18, 1898 (Saros 144)	June 17, 1909 (Saros 145)
May 18, 1920 (Saros 146)	April 18, 1931 (Saros 147)	March 16, 1942 (Saros 148)	February 14, 1953 (Saros 149)	January 14, 1964 (Saros 150)
December 13, 1974 (Saros 151)	November 12, 1985 (Saros 152)	October 12, 1996 (Saros 153)	September 11, 2007 (Saros 154)	August 11, 2018 (Saros 155)
July 11, 2029 (Saros 156)

=== Inex series ===
This eclipse is a part of the long period inex cycle, repeating at alternating nodes, every 358 synodic months (≈ 10,571.95 days, or 29 years minus 20 days). Their appearance and longitude are irregular due to a lack of synchronization with the anomalistic month (period of perigee). However, groupings of 3 inex cycles (≈ 87 years minus 2 months) comes close (≈ 1,151.02 anomalistic months), so eclipses are similar in these groupings.

Series members between 1801 and 2200
April 24, 1819 (Saros 145)	April 3, 1848 (Saros 146)	March 15, 1877 (Saros 147)
February 23, 1906 (Saros 148)	February 3, 1935 (Saros 149)	January 14, 1964 (Saros 150)
December 24, 1992 (Saros 151)	December 4, 2021 (Saros 152)	November 14, 2050 (Saros 153)
October 24, 2079 (Saros 154)	October 5, 2108 (Saros 155)	September 15, 2137 (Saros 156)
August 25, 2166 (Saros 157)	August 5, 2195 (Saros 158)	
