= Solar eclipse of September 11, 1969 =

20th-century annular solar eclipse

- Annular eclipse
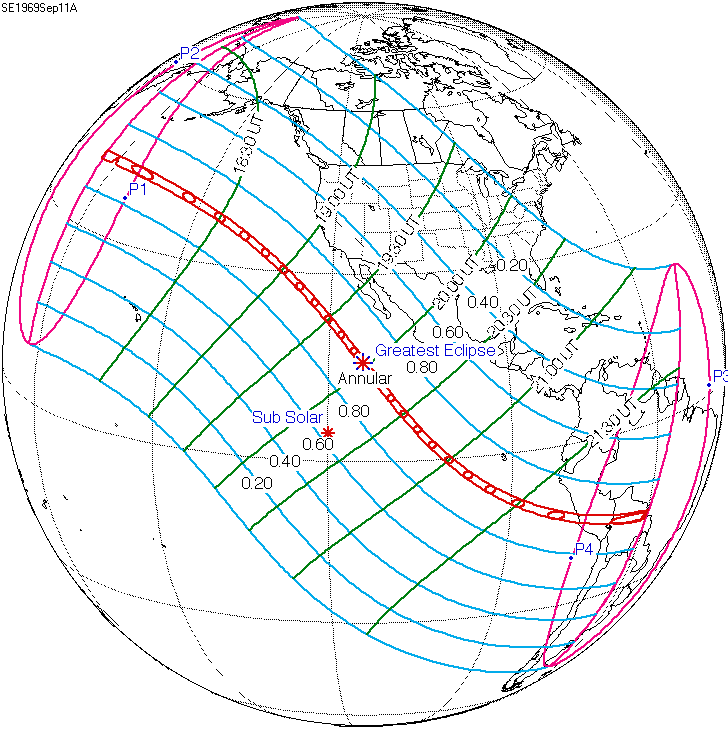
- Map
- Gamma: 0.2201
- Magnitude: 0.969

Maximum eclipse
- Duration: 191 s (3 min 11 s)
- Coordinates: 15.6°N 114.1°W
- Max. width of band: 114 km (71 mi)

Times (UTC)
- Greatest eclipse: 19:58:59

References
- Saros: 134 (41 of 71)
- Catalog # (SE5000): 9441

An annular solar eclipse occurred at the Moon's descending node of orbit on Thursday, September 11, 1969, with a magnitude of 0.969. A solar eclipse occurs when the Moon passes between Earth and the Sun, thereby totally or partly obscuring the image of the Sun for a viewer on Earth. An annular solar eclipse occurs when the Moon's apparent diameter is smaller than the Sun's, blocking most of the Sun's light and causing the Sun to look like an annulus (ring). An annular eclipse appears as a partial eclipse over a region of the Earth thousands of kilometres wide. Occurring about 5.2 days after apogee (on September 6, 1969, at 15:50 UTC), the Moon's apparent diameter was smaller.

Annularity was visible from the Pacific Ocean, Peru, Bolivia and the southwestern tip of Brazilian state Mato Grosso. A partial eclipse was visible for parts of North America, Central America, the Caribbean, and western South America. Places west of the International Date Line witnessed the eclipse on Friday, September 12, 1969.

== Eclipse details ==
Shown below are two tables displaying details about this particular solar eclipse. The first table outlines times at which the Moon's penumbra or umbra attains the specific parameter, and the second table describes various other parameters pertaining to this eclipse.

September 11, 1969 Solar Eclipse Times
Event	Time (UTC)
First Penumbral External Contact	1969 September 11 at 17:02:10.6 UTC
First Umbral External Contact	1969 September 11 at 18:05:48.3 UTC
First Central Line	1969 September 11 at 18:07:22.6 UTC
First Umbral Internal Contact	1969 September 11 at 18:08:57.1 UTC
Greatest Duration	1969 September 11 at 18:58:29.1 UTC
First Penumbral Internal Contact	1969 September 11 at 19:15:35.4 UTC
Equatorial Conjunction	1969 September 11 at 19:45:07.4 UTC
Ecliptic Conjunction	1969 September 11 at 19:56:27.0 UTC
Greatest Eclipse	1969 September 11 at 19:58:58.7 UTC
Last Penumbral Internal Contact	1969 September 11 at 20:42:42.5 UTC
Last Umbral Internal Contact	1969 September 11 at 21:49:10.9 UTC
Last Central Line	1969 September 11 at 21:50:42.6 UTC
Last Umbral External Contact	1969 September 11 at 21:52:14.2 UTC
Last Penumbral External Contact	1969 September 11 at 22:55:46.4 UTC

September 11, 1969 Solar Eclipse Parameters
Parameter	Value
Eclipse Magnitude	0.96904
Eclipse Obscuration	0.93904
Gamma	0.22014
Sun Right Ascension	11h19m09.2s
Sun Declination	+04°23'48.2"
Sun Semi-Diameter	15'53.5"
Sun Equatorial Horizontal Parallax	08.7"
Moon Right Ascension	11h19m32.8s
Moon Declination	+04°34'30.9"
Moon Semi-Diameter	15'10.1"
Moon Equatorial Horizontal Parallax	0°55'40.1"
ΔT	39.9 s

== Eclipse season ==
This eclipse is part of an eclipse season, a period, roughly every six months, when eclipses occur. Only two (or occasionally three) eclipse seasons occur each year, and each season lasts about 35 days and repeats just short of six months (173 days) later; thus two full eclipse seasons always occur each year. Either two or three eclipses happen each eclipse season. In the sequence below, each eclipse is separated by a fortnight. The first and last eclipse in this sequence is separated by one synodic month.

Eclipse season of August–September 1969
August 27 Ascending node (full moon)	September 11 Descending node (new moon)	September 25 Ascending node (full moon)
Penumbral lunar eclipse Lunar Saros 108	Annular solar eclipse Solar Saros 134	Penumbral lunar eclipse Lunar Saros 146

== Related eclipses ==
=== Eclipses in 1969 ===
- An annular solar eclipse on March 18.
- A penumbral lunar eclipse on April 2.
- A penumbral lunar eclipse on August 27.
- An annular solar eclipse on September 11.
- A penumbral lunar eclipse on September 25.

=== Metonic ===
- Preceded by: Solar eclipse of November 23, 1965
- Followed by: Solar eclipse of June 30, 1973

=== Tzolkinex ===
- Preceded by: Solar eclipse of July 31, 1962
- Followed by: Solar eclipse of October 23, 1976

=== Half-Saros ===
- Preceded by: Lunar eclipse of September 5, 1960
- Followed by: Lunar eclipse of September 16, 1978

=== Tritos ===
- Preceded by: Solar eclipse of October 12, 1958
- Followed by: Solar eclipse of August 10, 1980

=== Solar Saros 134 ===
- Preceded by: Solar eclipse of September 1, 1951
- Followed by: Solar eclipse of September 23, 1987

=== Inex ===
- Preceded by: Solar eclipse of October 1, 1940
- Followed by: Solar eclipse of August 22, 1998

=== Triad ===
- Preceded by: Solar eclipse of November 10, 1882
- Followed by: Solar eclipse of July 12, 2056

=== Solar eclipses of 1968–1971 ===
This eclipse is a member of a semester series. An eclipse in a semester series of solar eclipses repeats approximately every 177 days and 4 hours (a semester) at alternating nodes of the Moon's orbit.

The partial solar eclipse on July 22, 1971 occurs in the next lunar year eclipse set.

Solar eclipse series sets from 1968 to 1971
Ascending node			Descending node		
Saros	Map	Gamma	Saros	Map	Gamma
119	March 28, 1968 Partial	−1.037	124	September 22, 1968 Total	0.9451
129	March 18, 1969 Annular	−0.2704	134	September 11, 1969 Annular	0.2201
139 Totality in Williamston, NC; USA	March 7, 1970 Total	0.4473	144	August 31, 1970 Annular	−0.5364
149	February 25, 1971 Partial	1.1188	154	August 20, 1971 Partial	−1.2659

=== Saros 134 ===
This eclipse is a part of Saros series 134, repeating every 18 years, 11 days, and containing 71 events. The series started with a partial solar eclipse on June 22, 1248. It contains total eclipses from October 9, 1428 through December 24, 1554; hybrid eclipses from January 3, 1573 through June 27, 1843; and annular eclipses from July 8, 1861 through May 21, 2384. The series ends at member 72 as a partial eclipse on August 6, 2510. Its eclipses are tabulated in three columns; every third eclipse in the same column is one exeligmos apart, so they all cast shadows over approximately the same parts of the Earth.

The longest duration of totality was produced by member 11 at 1 minutes, 30 seconds on October 9, 1428, and the longest duration of annularity will be produced by member 52 at 10 minutes, 55 seconds on January 10, 2168. All eclipses in this series occur at the Moon’s descending node of orbit.

Series members 32–53 occur between 1801 and 2200:
32	33	34
June 6, 1807	June 16, 1825	June 27, 1843
35	36	37
July 8, 1861	July 19, 1879	July 29, 1897
38	39	40
August 10, 1915	August 21, 1933	September 1, 1951
41	42	43
September 11, 1969	September 23, 1987	October 3, 2005
44	45	46
October 14, 2023	October 25, 2041	November 5, 2059
47	48	49
November 15, 2077	November 27, 2095	December 8, 2113
50	51	52
December 19, 2131	December 30, 2149	January 10, 2168
53
January 20, 2186

=== Metonic series ===
The metonic series repeats eclipses every 19 years (6939.69 days), lasting about 5 cycles. Eclipses occur in nearly the same calendar date. In addition, the octon subseries repeats 1/5 of that or every 3.8 years (1387.94 days). All eclipses in this table occur at the Moon's descending node.

22 eclipse events between September 12, 1931 and July 1, 2011
September 11–12	June 30–July 1	April 17–19	February 4–5	November 22–23
114	116	118	120	122
September 12, 1931	June 30, 1935	April 19, 1939	February 4, 1943	November 23, 1946
124	126	128	130	132
September 12, 1950	June 30, 1954	April 19, 1958	February 5, 1962	November 23, 1965
134	136	138	140	142
September 11, 1969	June 30, 1973	April 18, 1977	February 4, 1981	November 22, 1984
144	146	148	150	152
September 11, 1988	June 30, 1992	April 17, 1996	February 5, 2000	November 23, 2003
154	156			
September 11, 2007	July 1, 2011			

=== Tritos series ===
This eclipse is a part of a tritos cycle, repeating at alternating nodes every 135 synodic months (≈ 3986.63 days, or 11 years minus 1 month). Their appearance and longitude are irregular due to a lack of synchronization with the anomalistic month (period of perigee), but groupings of 3 tritos cycles (≈ 33 years minus 3 months) come close (≈ 434.044 anomalistic months), so eclipses are similar in these groupings.

Series members between 1801 and 2200
December 21, 1805 (Saros 119)	November 19, 1816 (Saros 120)	October 20, 1827 (Saros 121)	September 18, 1838 (Saros 122)	August 18, 1849 (Saros 123)
July 18, 1860 (Saros 124)	June 18, 1871 (Saros 125)	May 17, 1882 (Saros 126)	April 16, 1893 (Saros 127)	March 17, 1904 (Saros 128)
February 14, 1915 (Saros 129)	January 14, 1926 (Saros 130)	December 13, 1936 (Saros 131)	November 12, 1947 (Saros 132)	October 12, 1958 (Saros 133)
September 11, 1969 (Saros 134)	August 10, 1980 (Saros 135)	July 11, 1991 (Saros 136)	June 10, 2002 (Saros 137)	May 10, 2013 (Saros 138)
April 8, 2024 (Saros 139)	March 9, 2035 (Saros 140)	February 5, 2046 (Saros 141)	January 5, 2057 (Saros 142)	December 6, 2067 (Saros 143)
November 4, 2078 (Saros 144)	October 4, 2089 (Saros 145)	September 4, 2100 (Saros 146)	August 4, 2111 (Saros 147)	July 4, 2122 (Saros 148)
June 3, 2133 (Saros 149)	May 3, 2144 (Saros 150)	April 2, 2155 (Saros 151)	March 2, 2166 (Saros 152)	January 29, 2177 (Saros 153)
December 29, 2187 (Saros 154)	November 28, 2198 (Saros 155)			

=== Inex series ===
This eclipse is a part of the long period inex cycle, repeating at alternating nodes, every 358 synodic months (≈ 10,571.95 days, or 29 years minus 20 days). Their appearance and longitude are irregular due to a lack of synchronization with the anomalistic month (period of perigee). However, groupings of 3 inex cycles (≈ 87 years minus 2 months) comes close (≈ 1,151.02 anomalistic months), so eclipses are similar in these groupings.

Series members between 1801 and 2200
December 20, 1824 (Saros 129)	November 30, 1853 (Saros 130)	November 10, 1882 (Saros 131)
October 22, 1911 (Saros 132)	October 1, 1940 (Saros 133)	September 11, 1969 (Saros 134)
August 22, 1998 (Saros 135)	August 2, 2027 (Saros 136)	July 12, 2056 (Saros 137)
June 22, 2085 (Saros 138)	June 3, 2114 (Saros 139)	May 14, 2143 (Saros 140)
April 23, 2172 (Saros 141)		
