= Solar eclipse of November 22, 1900 =

Annular solar eclipse in November 1900

- Annular eclipse
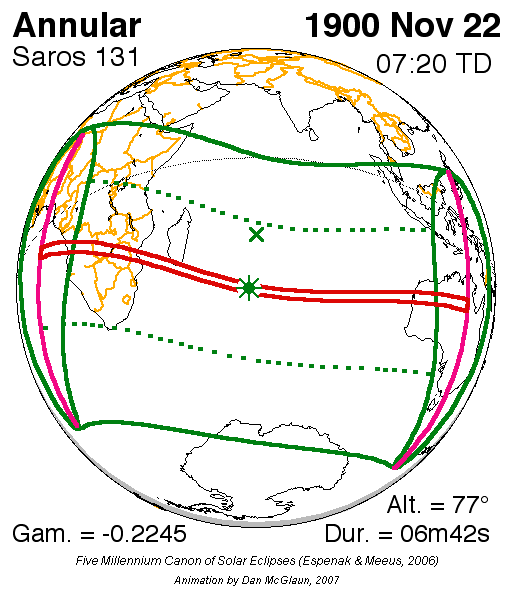
- Map
- Gamma: −0.2245
- Magnitude: 0.9421

Maximum eclipse
- Duration: 402 s (6 min 42 s)
- Coordinates: 33.1°S 64.8°E
- Max. width of band: 220 km (140 mi)

Times (UTC)
- Greatest eclipse: 7:19:43

References
- Saros: 131 (44 of 70)
- Catalog # (SE5000): 9282

An annular solar eclipse occurred at the Moon's ascending node of orbit on Thursday, November 22, 1900, with a magnitude of 0.9421. A solar eclipse occurs when the Moon passes between Earth and the Sun, thereby totally or partly obscuring the image of the Sun for a viewer on Earth. An annular solar eclipse occurs when the Moon's apparent diameter is smaller than the Sun's, blocking most of the Sun's light and causing the Sun to look like an annulus (ring). An annular eclipse appears as a partial eclipse over a region of the Earth thousands of kilometres wide. Occurring about 4.5 days after apogee (on November 17, 1900, at 18:30 UTC), the Moon's apparent diameter was smaller. This was also the last solar eclipse of the 19th century.

This eclipse's path traveled east, beginning in the Atlantic Ocean off the coast of southern Africa, traversing the continent, and passing through the Indian Ocean before terminating in Australia, in northeast Queensland. Outside the center of its path, the section of the Earth from which it was visible included locations in Africa such as the Cape of Good Hope, Natal, Pretoria, and the south end of Madagascar. On the eastern portion of the path, it passed over the southern portion of the Philippine islands.

== Observations ==
It appeared in some form over all of Australia, although only partially visible in most of it. It entered near Shark Bay and was partially visible in Adelaide. It was observed clearly from Melbourne, where it was seen "under favorable conditions, the sky being cloudless". Elsewhere in Australia, newspapers reported that it was seen from Rydal and Murrumburrah in New South Wales. An observer in Perth said that it was "distinctly visible", as "the sky was quite clear owing to the dimness of the sun's light. Persons out of doors could not fail to notice the eclipse." The Government Astronomer, W. E. Cooke, said that "in the streets it was observed by numbers of people with the aid of a piece of smoked or neutral tinted glass, and at the Observatory the exact times of commencement and finish were noted with the aid of the large equatorial".

At the time, it was claimed by Ira D. Hicks that the conjunction would "greatly increase atmospheric, electrical and seismic perturbations during the reactionary period, 21st to 23d". Viewers in Australia were advised to view the Sun through smoked glass, "prepared by holding it over the flame of an ordinary wax candle or vesta". It was expected to be "of little importance to astronomers for scientific purposes, excepting in showing how accurately such events may now be predicted".

== Eclipse details ==
Shown below are two tables displaying details about this particular solar eclipse. The first table outlines times at which the Moon's penumbra or umbra attains the specific parameter, and the second table describes various other parameters pertaining to this eclipse.

November 22, 1900 Solar Eclipse Times
Event	Time (UTC)
First Penumbral External Contact	1900 November 22 at 04:19:31.9 UTC
First Umbral External Contact	1900 November 22 at 05:24:00.5 UTC
First Central Line	1900 November 22 at 05:26:34.2 UTC
First Umbral Internal Contact	1900 November 22 at 05:29:08.2 UTC
First Penumbral Internal Contact	1900 November 22 at 06:36:53.5 UTC
Ecliptic Conjunction	1900 November 22 at 07:17:05.1 UTC
Greatest Eclipse	1900 November 22 at 07:19:42.8 UTC
Equatorial Conjunction	1900 November 22 at 07:22:44.6 UTC
Greatest Duration	1900 November 22 at 07:22:49.6 UTC
Last Penumbral Internal Contact	1900 November 22 at 08:02:28.1 UTC
Last Umbral Internal Contact	1900 November 22 at 09:10:16.9 UTC
Last Central Line	1900 November 22 at 09:12:48.5 UTC
Last Umbral External Contact	1900 November 22 at 09:15:19.8 UTC
Last Penumbral External Contact	1900 November 22 at 10:19:46.8 UTC

November 22, 1900 Solar Eclipse Parameters
Parameter	Value
Eclipse Magnitude	0.94207
Eclipse Obscuration	0.88750
Gamma	−0.22450
Sun Right Ascension	15h49m25.8s
Sun Declination	-20°03'58.1"
Sun Semi-Diameter	16'11.9"
Sun Equatorial Horizontal Parallax	08.9"
Moon Right Ascension	15h49m19.7s
Moon Declination	-20°16'14.2"
Moon Semi-Diameter	15'02.0"
Moon Equatorial Horizontal Parallax	0°55'10.4"
ΔT	-1.5 s

== Eclipse season ==
This eclipse is part of an eclipse season, a period, roughly every six months, when eclipses occur. Only two (or occasionally three) eclipse seasons occur each year, and each season lasts about 35 days and repeats just short of six months (173 days) later; thus two full eclipse seasons always occur each year. Either two or three eclipses happen each eclipse season. In the sequence below, each eclipse is separated by a fortnight.

Eclipse season of November–December 1900
November 22 Descending node (new moon)	December 6 Ascending node (full moon)
Annular solar eclipse Solar Saros 131	Penumbral lunar eclipse Lunar Saros 143

== Related eclipses ==
=== Eclipses in 1900 ===
- A total solar eclipse on May 28.
- A penumbral lunar eclipse on June 13.
- An annular solar eclipse on November 22.
- A penumbral lunar eclipse on December 6.

=== Metonic ===
- Preceded by: Solar eclipse of February 1, 1897
- Followed by: Solar eclipse of September 9, 1904

=== Tzolkinex ===
- Preceded by: Solar eclipse of October 11, 1893
- Followed by: Solar eclipse of January 3, 1908

=== Half-Saros ===
- Preceded by: Lunar eclipse of November 16, 1891
- Followed by: Lunar eclipse of November 27, 1909

=== Tritos ===
- Preceded by: Solar eclipse of December 22, 1889
- Followed by: Solar eclipse of October 22, 1911

=== Solar Saros 131 ===
- Preceded by: Solar eclipse of November 10, 1882
- Followed by: Solar eclipse of December 3, 1918

=== Inex ===
- Preceded by: Solar eclipse of December 12, 1871
- Followed by: Solar eclipse of November 1, 1929

=== Triad ===
- Preceded by: Solar eclipse of January 21, 1814
- Followed by: Solar eclipse of September 23, 1987

=== Solar eclipses of 1898–1902 ===
This eclipse is a member of a semester series. An eclipse in a semester series of solar eclipses repeats approximately every 177 days and 4 hours (a semester) at alternating nodes of the Moon's orbit.

The solar eclipses on January 22, 1898 (total) and July 18, 1898 (annular) occur in the previous lunar year eclipse set, and the partial solar eclipse on April 8, 1902 occurs in the next lunar year eclipse set.

Solar eclipse series sets from 1898 to 1902
Ascending node			Descending node		
Saros	Map	Gamma	Saros	Map	Gamma
111	December 13, 1898 Partial	−1.5252	116	June 8, 1899 Partial	1.2089
121	December 3, 1899 Annular	−0.9061	126 Totality in Wadesboro, North Carolina	May 28, 1900 Total	0.3943
131	November 22, 1900 Annular	−0.2245	136	May 18, 1901 Total	−0.3626
141	November 11, 1901 Annular	0.4758	146	May 7, 1902 Partial	−1.0831
151	October 31, 1902 Partial	1.1556			

=== Saros 131 ===
This eclipse is a part of Saros series 131, repeating every 18 years, 11 days, and containing 70 events. The series started with a partial solar eclipse on August 1, 1125. It contains total eclipses from March 27, 1522 through May 30, 1612; hybrid eclipses from June 10, 1630 through July 24, 1702; and annular eclipses from August 4, 1720 through June 18, 2243. The series ends at member 70 as a partial eclipse on September 2, 2369. Its eclipses are tabulated in three columns; every third eclipse in the same column is one exeligmos apart, so they all cast shadows over approximately the same parts of the Earth.

The longest duration of totality was produced by member 28 at 58 seconds on May 30, 1612, and the longest duration of annularity was produced by member 50 at 7 minutes, 54 seconds on January 26, 2009. All eclipses in this series occur at the Moon’s ascending node of orbit.

Series members 39–60 occur between 1801 and 2200:
39	40	41
September 28, 1810	October 9, 1828	October 20, 1846
42	43	44
October 30, 1864	November 10, 1882	November 22, 1900
45	46	47
December 3, 1918	December 13, 1936	December 25, 1954
48	49	50
January 4, 1973	January 15, 1991	January 26, 2009
51	52	53
February 6, 2027	February 16, 2045	February 28, 2063
54	55	56
March 10, 2081	March 21, 2099	April 2, 2117
57	58	59
April 13, 2135	April 23, 2153	May 5, 2171
60
May 15, 2189

=== Metonic series ===
The metonic series repeats eclipses every 19 years (6939.69 days), lasting about 5 cycles. Eclipses occur in nearly the same calendar date. In addition, the octon subseries repeats 1/5 of that or every 3.8 years (1387.94 days). All eclipses in this table occur at the Moon's ascending node.

23 eclipse events between February 3, 1859 and June 29, 1946
February 1–3	November 21–22	September 8–10	June 28–29	April 16–18
109	111	113	115	117
February 3, 1859	November 21, 1862		June 28, 1870	April 16, 1874
119	121	123	125	127
February 2, 1878	November 21, 1881	September 8, 1885	June 28, 1889	April 16, 1893
129	131	133	135	137
February 1, 1897	November 22, 1900	September 9, 1904	June 28, 1908	April 17, 1912
139	141	143	145	147
February 3, 1916	November 22, 1919	September 10, 1923	June 29, 1927	April 18, 1931
149	151	153	155	
February 3, 1935	November 21, 1938	September 10, 1942	June 29, 1946	

=== Tritos series ===
This eclipse is a part of a tritos cycle, repeating at alternating nodes every 135 synodic months (≈ 3986.63 days, or 11 years minus 1 month). Their appearance and longitude are irregular due to a lack of synchronization with the anomalistic month (period of perigee), but groupings of 3 tritos cycles (≈ 33 years minus 3 months) come close (≈ 434.044 anomalistic months), so eclipses are similar in these groupings.

Series members between 1801 and 2200
August 28, 1802 (Saros 122)	July 27, 1813 (Saros 123)	June 26, 1824 (Saros 124)	May 27, 1835 (Saros 125)	April 25, 1846 (Saros 126)
March 25, 1857 (Saros 127)	February 23, 1868 (Saros 128)	January 22, 1879 (Saros 129)	December 22, 1889 (Saros 130)	November 22, 1900 (Saros 131)
October 22, 1911 (Saros 132)	September 21, 1922 (Saros 133)	August 21, 1933 (Saros 134)	July 20, 1944 (Saros 135)	June 20, 1955 (Saros 136)
May 20, 1966 (Saros 137)	April 18, 1977 (Saros 138)	March 18, 1988 (Saros 139)	February 16, 1999 (Saros 140)	January 15, 2010 (Saros 141)
December 14, 2020 (Saros 142)	November 14, 2031 (Saros 143)	October 14, 2042 (Saros 144)	September 12, 2053 (Saros 145)	August 12, 2064 (Saros 146)
July 13, 2075 (Saros 147)	June 11, 2086 (Saros 148)	May 11, 2097 (Saros 149)	April 11, 2108 (Saros 150)	March 11, 2119 (Saros 151)
February 8, 2130 (Saros 152)	January 8, 2141 (Saros 153)	December 8, 2151 (Saros 154)	November 7, 2162 (Saros 155)	October 7, 2173 (Saros 156)
September 4, 2184 (Saros 157)	August 5, 2195 (Saros 158)			

=== Inex series ===
This eclipse is a part of the long period inex cycle, repeating at alternating nodes, every 358 synodic months (≈ 10,571.95 days, or 29 years minus 20 days). Their appearance and longitude are irregular due to a lack of synchronization with the anomalistic month (period of perigee). However, groupings of 3 inex cycles (≈ 87 years minus 2 months) comes close (≈ 1,151.02 anomalistic months), so eclipses are similar in these groupings.

Series members between 1801 and 2200
January 21, 1814 (Saros 128)	December 31, 1842 (Saros 129)	December 12, 1871 (Saros 130)
November 22, 1900 (Saros 131)	November 1, 1929 (Saros 132)	October 12, 1958 (Saros 133)
September 23, 1987 (Saros 134)	September 1, 2016 (Saros 135)	August 12, 2045 (Saros 136)
July 24, 2074 (Saros 137)	July 4, 2103 (Saros 138)	June 13, 2132 (Saros 139)
May 25, 2161 (Saros 140)	May 4, 2190 (Saros 141)	

== See also ==
- List of solar eclipses in the 19th century
