= Solar eclipse of September 9, 1904 =

Total eclipse

- Total eclipse
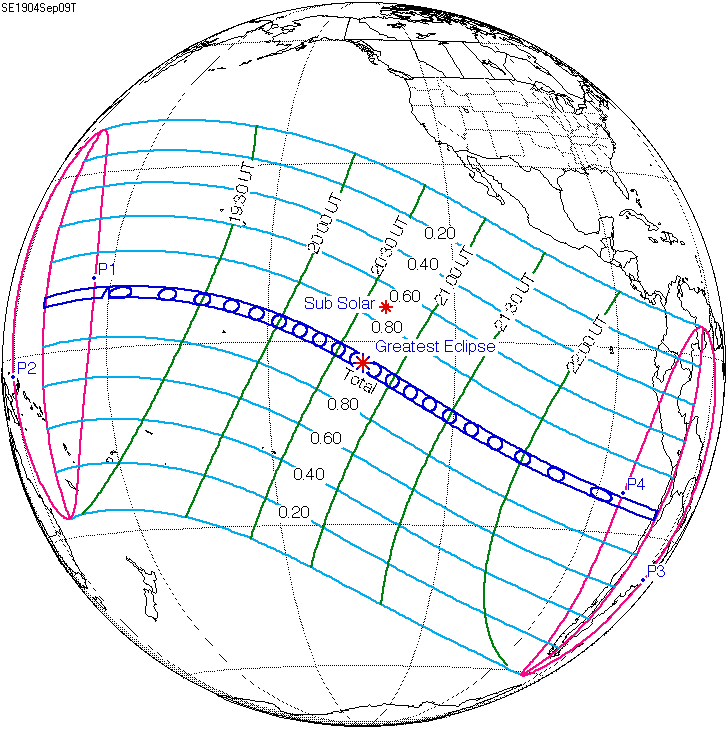
- Map
- Gamma: −0.1625
- Magnitude: 1.0709

Maximum eclipse
- Duration: 380 s (6 min 20 s)
- Coordinates: 3.7°S 134.5°W
- Max. width of band: 234 km (145 mi)

Times (UTC)
- Greatest eclipse: 20:44:21

References
- Saros: 133 (39 of 72)
- Catalog # (SE5000): 9291

A total solar eclipse occurred at the Moon's ascending node of orbit on Friday, September 9, 1904, with a magnitude of 1.0709. A solar eclipse occurs when the Moon passes between Earth and the Sun, thereby totally or partly obscuring the image of the Sun for a viewer on Earth. A total solar eclipse occurs when the Moon's apparent diameter is larger than the Sun's, blocking all direct sunlight, turning day into darkness. Totality occurs in a narrow path across Earth's surface, with the partial solar eclipse visible over a surrounding region thousands of kilometres wide. Occurring about 1.5 hours after perigee (on September 9, 1904, at 19:10 UTC), the Moon's apparent diameter was larger.

Totality was visible from German New Guinea (the part now belonging to Marshall Islands) on September 10 and Chile on September 9. A partial eclipse was visible for parts of Oceania and Western South America.

The event is mentioned in James Joyce's 1922 novel Ulysses.

== Observations ==
The National Astronomical Observatory of Chile established an observation station in Taltal, Antofagasta, but the eclipse was clouded out and could not be seen. In the capital city Santiago, a partial eclipse was seen just before sunset.

== Eclipse details ==
Shown below are two tables displaying details about this particular solar eclipse. The first table outlines times at which the Moon's penumbra or umbra attains the specific parameter, and the second table describes various other parameters pertaining to this eclipse.

September 9, 1904 Solar Eclipse Times
Event	Time (UTC)
First Penumbral External Contact	1904 September 9 at 18:07:46.2 UTC
First Umbral External Contact	1904 September 9 at 19:01:33.0 UTC
First Central Line	1904 September 9 at 19:02:57.8 UTC
First Umbral Internal Contact	1904 September 9 at 19:04:22.7 UTC
First Penumbral Internal Contact	1904 September 9 at 19:59:18.7 UTC
Greatest Duration	1904 September 9 at 20:42:32.1 UTC
Ecliptic Conjunction	1904 September 9 at 20:42:41.4 UTC
Greatest Eclipse	1904 September 9 at 20:44:20.7 UTC
Equatorial Conjunction	1904 September 9 at 20:49:31.5 UTC
Last Penumbral Internal Contact	1904 September 9 at 21:29:14.6 UTC
Last Umbral Internal Contact	1904 September 9 at 22:24:15.2 UTC
Last Central Line	1904 September 9 at 22:25:39.9 UTC
Last Umbral External Contact	1904 September 9 at 22:27:04.6 UTC
Last Penumbral External Contact	1904 September 9 at 23:20:53.1 UTC

September 9, 1904 Solar Eclipse Parameters
Parameter	Value
Eclipse Magnitude	1.07094
Eclipse Obscuration	1.14691
Gamma	−0.16252
Sun Right Ascension	11h11m04.6s
Sun Declination	+05°15'01.3"
Sun Semi-Diameter	15'53.2"
Sun Equatorial Horizontal Parallax	08.7"
Moon Right Ascension	11h10m52.8s
Moon Declination	+05°05'30.9"
Moon Semi-Diameter	16'43.6"
Moon Equatorial Horizontal Parallax	1°01'23.4"
ΔT	3.4 s

== Eclipse season ==
This eclipse is part of an eclipse season, a period, roughly every six months, when eclipses occur. Only two (or occasionally three) eclipse seasons occur each year, and each season lasts about 35 days and repeats just short of six months (173 days) later; thus two full eclipse seasons always occur each year. Either two or three eclipses happen each eclipse season. In the sequence below, each eclipse is separated by a fortnight.

Eclipse season of September 1904
September 9 Ascending node (new moon)	September 24 Descending node (full moon)
Total solar eclipse Solar Saros 133	Penumbral lunar eclipse Lunar Saros 145

== Related eclipses ==
=== Eclipses in 1904 ===
- A penumbral lunar eclipse on March 2.
- An annular solar eclipse on March 17.
- A penumbral lunar eclipse on March 31.
- A total solar eclipse on September 9.
- A penumbral lunar eclipse on September 24.

=== Metonic ===
- Preceded by: Solar eclipse of November 22, 1900
- Followed by: Solar eclipse of June 28, 1908

=== Tzolkinex ===
- Preceded by: Solar eclipse of July 29, 1897
- Followed by: Solar eclipse of October 22, 1911

=== Half-Saros ===
- Preceded by: Lunar eclipse of September 4, 1895
- Followed by: Lunar eclipse of September 15, 1913

=== Tritos ===
- Preceded by: Solar eclipse of October 9, 1893
- Followed by: Solar eclipse of August 10, 1915

=== Solar Saros 133 ===
- Preceded by: Solar eclipse of August 29, 1886
- Followed by: Solar eclipse of September 21, 1922

=== Inex ===
- Preceded by: Solar eclipse of September 29, 1875
- Followed by: Solar eclipse of August 21, 1933

=== Triad ===
- Preceded by: Solar eclipse of November 9, 1817
- Followed by: Solar eclipse of July 11, 1991

=== Solar eclipses of 1902–1906 ===
This eclipse is a member of a semester series. An eclipse in a semester series of solar eclipses repeats approximately every 177 days and 4 hours (a semester) at alternating nodes of the Moon's orbit.

The partial solar eclipses on May 7, 1902 and October 31, 1902 occur in the previous lunar year eclipse set, and the partial solar eclipse on July 21, 1906 occurs in the next lunar year eclipse set.

Solar eclipse series sets from 1902 to 1906
Descending node			Ascending node		
Saros	Map	Gamma	Saros	Map	Gamma
108	April 8, 1902 Partial	1.5024	113	October 1, 1902	
118	March 29, 1903 Annular	0.8413	123	September 21, 1903 Total	−0.8967
128	March 17, 1904 Annular	0.1299	133	September 9, 1904 Total	−0.1625
138	March 6, 1905 Annular	−0.5768	143	August 30, 1905 Total	0.5708
148	February 23, 1906 Partial	−1.2479	153	August 20, 1906 Partial	1.3731

=== Saros 133 ===
This eclipse is a part of Saros series 133, repeating every 18 years, 11 days, and containing 72 events. The series started with a partial solar eclipse on July 13, 1219. It contains annular eclipses from November 20, 1435 through January 13, 1526; a hybrid eclipse on January 24, 1544; and total eclipses from February 3, 1562 through June 21, 2373. The series ends at member 72 as a partial eclipse on September 5, 2499. Its eclipses are tabulated in three columns; every third eclipse in the same column is one exeligmos apart, so they all cast shadows over approximately the same parts of the Earth.

The longest duration of annularity was produced by member 25 at 1 minutes, 14 seconds on November 30, 1453, and the longest duration of totality was produced by member 61 at 6 minutes, 50 seconds on August 7, 1850. All eclipses in this series occur at the Moon’s ascending node of orbit.

Series members 34–55 occur between 1801 and 2200:
34	35	36
July 17, 1814	July 27, 1832	August 7, 1850
37	38	39
August 18, 1868	August 29, 1886	September 9, 1904
40	41	42
September 21, 1922	October 1, 1940	October 12, 1958
43	44	45
October 23, 1976	November 3, 1994	November 13, 2012
46	47	48
November 25, 2030	December 5, 2048	December 17, 2066
49	50	51
December 27, 2084	January 8, 2103	January 19, 2121
52	53	54
January 30, 2139	February 9, 2157	February 21, 2175
55
March 3, 2193

=== Metonic series ===
The metonic series repeats eclipses every 19 years (6939.69 days), lasting about 5 cycles. Eclipses occur in nearly the same calendar date. In addition, the octon subseries repeats 1/5 of that or every 3.8 years (1387.94 days). All eclipses in this table occur at the Moon's ascending node.

23 eclipse events between February 3, 1859 and June 29, 1946
February 1–3	November 21–22	September 8–10	June 28–29	April 16–18
109	111	113	115	117
February 3, 1859	November 21, 1862		June 28, 1870	April 16, 1874
119	121	123	125	127
February 2, 1878	November 21, 1881	September 8, 1885	June 28, 1889	April 16, 1893
129	131	133	135	137
February 1, 1897	November 22, 1900	September 9, 1904	June 28, 1908	April 17, 1912
139	141	143	145	147
February 3, 1916	November 22, 1919	September 10, 1923	June 29, 1927	April 18, 1931
149	151	153	155	
February 3, 1935	November 21, 1938	September 10, 1942	June 29, 1946	

=== Tritos series ===
This eclipse is a part of a tritos cycle, repeating at alternating nodes every 135 synodic months (≈ 3986.63 days, or 11 years minus 1 month). Their appearance and longitude are irregular due to a lack of synchronization with the anomalistic month (period of perigee), but groupings of 3 tritos cycles (≈ 33 years minus 3 months) come close (≈ 434.044 anomalistic months), so eclipses are similar in these groupings.

Series members between 1801 and 2200
June 16, 1806 (Saros 124)	May 16, 1817 (Saros 125)	April 14, 1828 (Saros 126)	March 15, 1839 (Saros 127)	February 12, 1850 (Saros 128)
January 11, 1861 (Saros 129)	December 12, 1871 (Saros 130)	November 10, 1882 (Saros 131)	October 9, 1893 (Saros 132)	September 9, 1904 (Saros 133)
August 10, 1915 (Saros 134)	July 9, 1926 (Saros 135)	June 8, 1937 (Saros 136)	May 9, 1948 (Saros 137)	April 8, 1959 (Saros 138)
March 7, 1970 (Saros 139)	February 4, 1981 (Saros 140)	January 4, 1992 (Saros 141)	December 4, 2002 (Saros 142)	November 3, 2013 (Saros 143)
October 2, 2024 (Saros 144)	September 2, 2035 (Saros 145)	August 2, 2046 (Saros 146)	July 1, 2057 (Saros 147)	May 31, 2068 (Saros 148)
May 1, 2079 (Saros 149)	March 31, 2090 (Saros 150)	February 28, 2101 (Saros 151)	January 29, 2112 (Saros 152)	December 28, 2122 (Saros 153)
November 26, 2133 (Saros 154)	October 26, 2144 (Saros 155)	September 26, 2155 (Saros 156)	August 25, 2166 (Saros 157)	July 25, 2177 (Saros 158)
June 24, 2188 (Saros 159)	May 24, 2199 (Saros 160)			

=== Inex series ===
This eclipse is a part of the long period inex cycle, repeating at alternating nodes, every 358 synodic months (≈ 10,571.95 days, or 29 years minus 20 days). Their appearance and longitude are irregular due to a lack of synchronization with the anomalistic month (period of perigee). However, groupings of 3 inex cycles (≈ 87 years minus 2 months) comes close (≈ 1,151.02 anomalistic months), so eclipses are similar in these groupings.

Series members between 1801 and 2200
November 9, 1817 (Saros 130)	October 20, 1846 (Saros 131)	September 29, 1875 (Saros 132)
September 9, 1904 (Saros 133)	August 21, 1933 (Saros 134)	July 31, 1962 (Saros 135)
July 11, 1991 (Saros 136)	June 21, 2020 (Saros 137)	May 31, 2049 (Saros 138)
May 11, 2078 (Saros 139)	April 23, 2107 (Saros 140)	April 1, 2136 (Saros 141)
March 12, 2165 (Saros 142)	February 21, 2194 (Saros 143)	
