= Solar eclipse of November 12, 1947 =

20th-century annular solar eclipse

- Annular eclipse
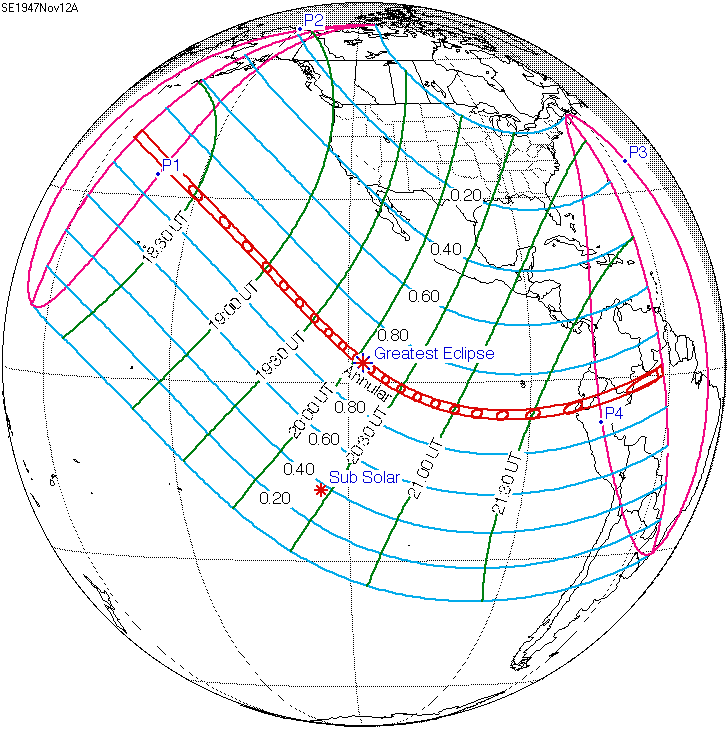
- Map
- Gamma: 0.3743
- Magnitude: 0.965

Maximum eclipse
- Duration: 239 s (3 min 59 s)
- Coordinates: 3°N 117.4°W
- Max. width of band: 135 km (84 mi)

Times (UTC)
- Greatest eclipse: 20:05:37

References
- Saros: 132 (42 of 71)
- Catalog # (SE5000): 9393

An annular solar eclipse occurred at the Moon's descending node of orbit on Wednesday, November 12, 1947, with a magnitude of 0.965. A solar eclipse occurs when the Moon passes between Earth and the Sun, thereby totally or partly obscuring the image of the Sun for a viewer on Earth. An annular solar eclipse occurs when the Moon's apparent diameter is smaller than the Sun's, blocking most of the Sun's light and causing the Sun to look like an annulus (ring). An annular eclipse appears as a partial eclipse over a region of the Earth thousands of kilometres wide. Occurring about 6.1 days before apogee (on November 18, 1947, at 23:30 UTC), the Moon's apparent diameter was smaller.

Annularity was visible from the Pacific Ocean, Peru, Ecuador, Colombia and Brazil. A partial eclipse was visible in parts of Hawaii, North America, Central America, the Caribbean, and western South America.

== Eclipse details ==
Shown below are two tables displaying details about this particular solar eclipse. The first table outlines times at which the Moon's penumbra or umbra attains the specific parameter, and the second table describes various other parameters pertaining to this eclipse.

November 12, 1947 Solar Eclipse Times
Event	Time (UTC)
First Penumbral External Contact	1947 November 12 at 17:14:24.4 UTC
First Umbral External Contact	1947 November 12 at 18:19:10.8 UTC
First Central Line	1947 November 12 at 18:20:53.4 UTC
First Umbral Internal Contact	1947 November 12 at 18:22:36.3 UTC
First Penumbral Internal Contact	1947 November 12 at 19:40:11.0 UTC
Equatorial Conjunction	1947 November 12 at 19:49:00.8 UTC
Ecliptic Conjunction	1947 November 12 at 20:01:22.9 UTC
Greatest Eclipse	1947 November 12 at 20:05:36.6 UTC
Last Penumbral Internal Contact	1947 November 12 at 20:31:25.1 UTC
Greatest Duration	1947 November 12 at 20:36:27.8 UTC
Last Umbral Internal Contact	1947 November 12 at 21:48:45.3 UTC
Last Central Line	1947 November 12 at 21:50:31.0 UTC
Last Umbral External Contact	1947 November 12 at 21:52:16.5 UTC
Last Penumbral External Contact	1947 November 12 at 22:57:02.2 UTC

November 12, 1947 Solar Eclipse Parameters
Parameter	Value
Eclipse Magnitude	0.96505
Eclipse Obscuration	0.93132
Gamma	0.37431
Sun Right Ascension	15h08m34.6s
Sun Declination	-17°38'16.9"
Sun Semi-Diameter	16'09.7"
Sun Equatorial Horizontal Parallax	08.9"
Moon Right Ascension	15h09m06.8s
Moon Declination	-17°18'40.3"
Moon Semi-Diameter	15'22.3"
Moon Equatorial Horizontal Parallax	0°56'24.7"
ΔT	28.2 s

== Eclipse season ==
This eclipse is part of an eclipse season, a period, roughly every six months, when eclipses occur. Only two (or occasionally three) eclipse seasons occur each year, and each season lasts about 35 days and repeats just short of six months (173 days) later; thus two full eclipse seasons always occur each year. Either two or three eclipses happen each eclipse season. In the sequence below, each eclipse is separated by a fortnight.

Eclipse season of November 1947
November 12 Descending node (new moon)	November 28 Ascending node (full moon)
Annular solar eclipse Solar Saros 132	Penumbral lunar eclipse Lunar Saros 144

== Related eclipses ==
=== Eclipses in 1947 ===
- A total solar eclipse on May 20.
- A partial lunar eclipse on June 3.
- An annular solar eclipse on November 12.
- A penumbral lunar eclipse on November 28.

=== Metonic ===
- Preceded by: Solar eclipse of January 25, 1944
- Followed by: Solar eclipse of September 1, 1951

=== Tzolkinex ===
- Preceded by: Solar eclipse of October 1, 1940
- Followed by: Solar eclipse of December 25, 1954

=== Half-Saros ===
- Preceded by: Lunar eclipse of November 7, 1938
- Followed by: Lunar eclipse of November 18, 1956

=== Tritos ===
- Preceded by: Solar eclipse of December 13, 1936
- Followed by: Solar eclipse of October 12, 1958

=== Solar Saros 132 ===
- Preceded by: Solar eclipse of November 1, 1929
- Followed by: Solar eclipse of November 23, 1965

=== Inex ===
- Preceded by: Solar eclipse of December 3, 1918
- Followed by: Solar eclipse of October 23, 1976

=== Triad ===
- Preceded by: Solar eclipse of January 11, 1861
- Followed by: Solar eclipse of September 12, 2034

=== Solar eclipses of 1946–1949 ===
This eclipse is a member of a semester series. An eclipse in a semester series of solar eclipses repeats approximately every 177 days and 4 hours (a semester) at alternating nodes of the Moon's orbit.

The partial solar eclipses on January 3, 1946 and June 29, 1946 occur in the previous lunar year eclipse set.

Solar eclipse series sets from 1946 to 1949
Ascending node			Descending node		
Saros	Map	Gamma	Saros	Map	Gamma
117	May 30, 1946 Partial	−1.0711	122	November 23, 1946 Partial	1.105
127	May 20, 1947 Total	−0.3528	132	November 12, 1947 Annular	0.3743
137	May 9, 1948 Annular	0.4133	142	November 1, 1948 Total	−0.3517
147	April 28, 1949 Partial	1.2068	152	October 21, 1949 Partial	−1.027

=== Saros 132 ===
This eclipse is a part of Saros series 132, repeating every 18 years, 11 days, and containing 71 events. The series started with a partial solar eclipse on August 13, 1208. It contains annular eclipses from March 17, 1569 through March 12, 2146; hybrid eclipses on March 23, 2164 and April 3, 2182; and total eclipses from April 14, 2200 through June 19, 2308. The series ends at member 71 as a partial eclipse on September 25, 2470. Its eclipses are tabulated in three columns; every third eclipse in the same column is one exeligmos apart, so they all cast shadows over approximately the same parts of the Earth.

The longest duration of annularity was produced by member 25 at 6 minutes, 56 seconds on May 9, 1641, and the longest duration of totality will be produced by member 61 at 2 minutes, 14 seconds on June 8, 2290. All eclipses in this series occur at the Moon’s descending node of orbit.

Series members 34–56 occur between 1801 and 2200:
34	35	36
August 17, 1803	August 27, 1821	September 7, 1839
37	38	39
September 18, 1857	September 29, 1875	October 9, 1893
40	41	42
October 22, 1911	November 1, 1929	November 12, 1947
43	44	45
November 23, 1965	December 4, 1983	December 14, 2001
46	47	48
December 26, 2019	January 5, 2038	January 16, 2056
49	50	51
January 27, 2074	February 7, 2092	February 18, 2110
52	53	54
March 1, 2128	March 12, 2146	March 23, 2164
55	56	
April 3, 2182	April 14, 2200	

=== Metonic series ===
The metonic series repeats eclipses every 19 years (6939.69 days), lasting about 5 cycles. Eclipses occur in nearly the same calendar date. In addition, the octon subseries repeats 1/5 of that or every 3.8 years (1387.94 days). All eclipses in this table occur at the Moon's descending node.

22 eclipse events between April 8, 1902 and August 31, 1989
April 7–8	January 24–25	November 12	August 31–September 1	June 19–20
108	110	112	114	116
April 8, 1902			August 31, 1913	June 19, 1917
118	120	122	124	126
April 8, 1921	January 24, 1925	November 12, 1928	August 31, 1932	June 19, 1936
128	130	132	134	136
April 7, 1940	January 25, 1944	November 12, 1947	September 1, 1951	June 20, 1955
138	140	142	144	146
April 8, 1959	January 25, 1963	November 12, 1966	August 31, 1970	June 20, 1974
148	150	152	154	
April 7, 1978	January 25, 1982	November 12, 1985	August 31, 1989	

=== Tritos series ===
This eclipse is a part of a tritos cycle, repeating at alternating nodes every 135 synodic months (≈ 3986.63 days, or 11 years minus 1 month). Their appearance and longitude are irregular due to a lack of synchronization with the anomalistic month (period of perigee), but groupings of 3 tritos cycles (≈ 33 years minus 3 months) come close (≈ 434.044 anomalistic months), so eclipses are similar in these groupings.

Series members between 1801 and 2200
December 21, 1805 (Saros 119)	November 19, 1816 (Saros 120)	October 20, 1827 (Saros 121)	September 18, 1838 (Saros 122)	August 18, 1849 (Saros 123)
July 18, 1860 (Saros 124)	June 18, 1871 (Saros 125)	May 17, 1882 (Saros 126)	April 16, 1893 (Saros 127)	March 17, 1904 (Saros 128)
February 14, 1915 (Saros 129)	January 14, 1926 (Saros 130)	December 13, 1936 (Saros 131)	November 12, 1947 (Saros 132)	October 12, 1958 (Saros 133)
September 11, 1969 (Saros 134)	August 10, 1980 (Saros 135)	July 11, 1991 (Saros 136)	June 10, 2002 (Saros 137)	May 10, 2013 (Saros 138)
April 8, 2024 (Saros 139)	March 9, 2035 (Saros 140)	February 5, 2046 (Saros 141)	January 5, 2057 (Saros 142)	December 6, 2067 (Saros 143)
November 4, 2078 (Saros 144)	October 4, 2089 (Saros 145)	September 4, 2100 (Saros 146)	August 4, 2111 (Saros 147)	July 4, 2122 (Saros 148)
June 3, 2133 (Saros 149)	May 3, 2144 (Saros 150)	April 2, 2155 (Saros 151)	March 2, 2166 (Saros 152)	January 29, 2177 (Saros 153)
December 29, 2187 (Saros 154)	November 28, 2198 (Saros 155)			

=== Inex series ===
This eclipse is a part of the long period inex cycle, repeating at alternating nodes, every 358 synodic months (≈ 10,571.95 days, or 29 years minus 20 days). Their appearance and longitude are irregular due to a lack of synchronization with the anomalistic month (period of perigee). However, groupings of 3 inex cycles (≈ 87 years minus 2 months) comes close (≈ 1,151.02 anomalistic months), so eclipses are similar in these groupings.

Series members between 1801 and 2200
February 21, 1803 (Saros 127)	February 1, 1832 (Saros 128)	January 11, 1861 (Saros 129)
December 22, 1889 (Saros 130)	December 3, 1918 (Saros 131)	November 12, 1947 (Saros 132)
October 23, 1976 (Saros 133)	October 3, 2005 (Saros 134)	September 12, 2034 (Saros 135)
August 24, 2063 (Saros 136)	August 3, 2092 (Saros 137)	July 14, 2121 (Saros 138)
June 25, 2150 (Saros 139)	June 5, 2179 (Saros 140)	
