= Solar eclipse of July 31, 1962 =

20th-century annular solar eclipse

- Annular eclipse
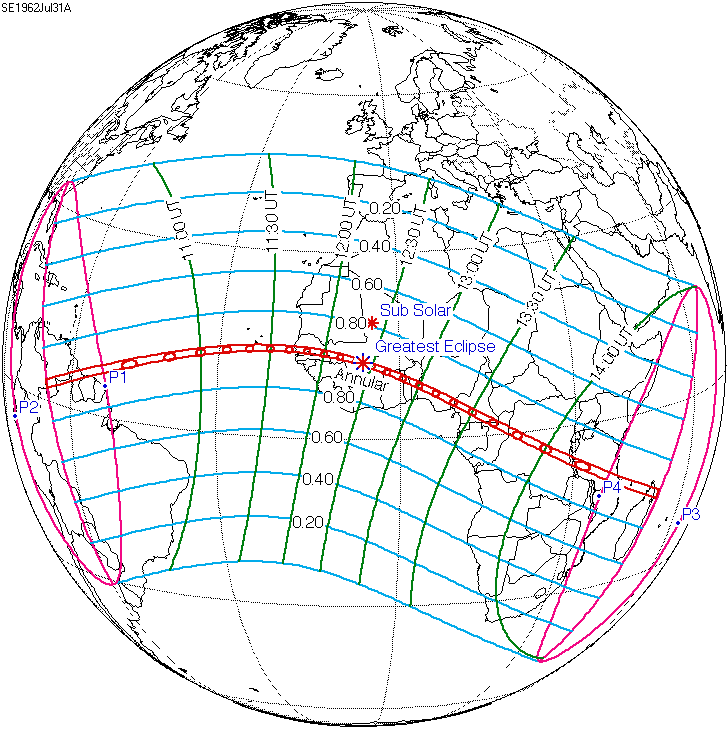
- Map
- Gamma: −0.113
- Magnitude: 0.9716

Maximum eclipse
- Duration: 213 s (3 min 33 s)
- Coordinates: 12°N 5.7°W
- Max. width of band: 103 km (64 mi)

Times (UTC)
- Greatest eclipse: 12:25:33

References
- Saros: 135 (36 of 71)
- Catalog # (SE5000): 9425

An annular solar eclipse occurred at the Moon's ascending node of orbit on Tuesday, July 31, 1962, with a magnitude of 0.9716. A solar eclipse occurs when the Moon passes between Earth and the Sun, thereby totally or partly obscuring the image of the Sun for a viewer on Earth. An annular solar eclipse occurs when the Moon's apparent diameter is smaller than the Sun's, blocking most of the Sun's light and causing the Sun to look like an annulus (ring). An annular eclipse appears as a partial eclipse over a region of the Earth thousands of kilometres wide. Occurring about 4.75 days before apogee (on August 5, 1962, at 6:40 UTC), the Moon's apparent diameter was smaller.

Places inside the annular eclipse included Venezuela, northern Roraima in Brazil, British Guiana (today's Guyana), Dutch Guiana (today's Suriname) including the capital city Paramaribo, Senegal, Gambia Colony and Protectorate (today's Gambia) including the southern part of the capital city Banjul, Mali including the capital city Bamako, Upper Volta (today's Burkina Faso), Ghana, Togo, Dahomey (today's Benin), Nigeria, Cameroon including the capital city Yaoundé, Congo-Brazzaville, Congo-Léopoldville (today's DR Congo), Tanganyika (now belonging to Tanzania), northeastern tip of Portuguese Mozambique (today's Mozambique), French Comoros (today's Comoros), Mayotte, and the Malagasy Republic (today's Madagascar). The greatest eclipse was in the area of Kouoro, Mali at 12 N, 5.7 W at 12:25 (UTC) and lasted for 3 minutes. A partial eclipse was visible for parts of the Caribbean, northern South America, Africa, Southern Europe, and the Middle East.

== Eclipse details ==
Shown below are two tables displaying details about this particular solar eclipse. The first table outlines times at which the Moon's penumbra or umbra attains the specific parameter, and the second table describes various other parameters pertaining to this eclipse.

July 31, 1962 Solar Eclipse Times
Event	Time (UTC)
First Penumbral External Contact	1962 July 31 at 09:26:25.2 UTC
First Umbral External Contact	1962 July 31 at 10:29:36.6 UTC
First Central Line	1962 July 31 at 10:31:02.3 UTC
First Umbral Internal Contact	1962 July 31 at 10:32:28.1 UTC
First Penumbral Internal Contact	1962 July 31 at 11:36:22.9 UTC
Greatest Duration	1962 July 31 at 12:19:39.3 UTC
Ecliptic Conjunction	1962 July 31 at 12:24:14.3 UTC
Greatest Eclipse	1962 July 31 at 12:25:32.5 UTC
Equatorial Conjunction	1962 July 31 at 12:27:38.6 UTC
Last Penumbral Internal Contact	1962 July 31 at 13:14:37.8 UTC
Last Umbral Internal Contact	1962 July 31 at 14:18:33.6 UTC
Last Central Line	1962 July 31 at 14:20:01.9 UTC
Last Umbral External Contact	1962 July 31 at 14:21:30.3 UTC
Last Penumbral External Contact	1962 July 31 at 15:24:44.6 UTC

July 31, 1962 Solar Eclipse Parameters
Parameter	Value
Eclipse Magnitude	0.97158
Eclipse Obscuration	0.94397
Gamma	−0.11296
Sun Right Ascension	08h40m53.9s
Sun Declination	+18°19'06.7"
Sun Semi-Diameter	15'45.4"
Sun Equatorial Horizontal Parallax	08.7"
Moon Right Ascension	08h40m49.8s
Moon Declination	+18°12'57.5"
Moon Semi-Diameter	15'04.6"
Moon Equatorial Horizontal Parallax	0°55'19.7"
ΔT	34.3 s

== Eclipse season ==
This eclipse is part of an eclipse season, a period, roughly every six months, when eclipses occur. Only two (or occasionally three) eclipse seasons occur each year, and each season lasts about 35 days and repeats just short of six months (173 days) later; thus two full eclipse seasons always occur each year. Either two or three eclipses happen each eclipse season. In the sequence below, each eclipse is separated by a fortnight. The first and last eclipse in this sequence is separated by one synodic month.

Eclipse season of July–August 1962
July 17 Descending node (full moon)	July 31 Ascending node (new moon)	August 15 Descending node (full moon)
Penumbral lunar eclipse Lunar Saros 109	Annular solar eclipse Solar Saros 135	Penumbral lunar eclipse Lunar Saros 147

== Related eclipses ==
=== Eclipses in 1962 ===
- A total solar eclipse on February 5.
- A penumbral lunar eclipse on February 19.
- A penumbral lunar eclipse on July 17.
- An annular solar eclipse on July 31.
- A penumbral lunar eclipse on August 15.

=== Metonic ===
- Preceded by: Solar eclipse of October 12, 1958
- Followed by: Solar eclipse of May 20, 1966

=== Tzolkinex ===
- Preceded by: Solar eclipse of June 20, 1955
- Followed by: Solar eclipse of September 11, 1969

=== Half-Saros ===
- Preceded by: Lunar eclipse of July 26, 1953
- Followed by: Lunar eclipse of August 6, 1971

=== Tritos ===
- Preceded by: Solar eclipse of September 1, 1951
- Followed by: Solar eclipse of June 30, 1973

=== Solar Saros 135 ===
- Preceded by: Solar eclipse of July 20, 1944
- Followed by: Solar eclipse of August 10, 1980

=== Inex ===
- Preceded by: Solar eclipse of August 21, 1933
- Followed by: Solar eclipse of July 11, 1991

=== Triad ===
- Preceded by: Solar eclipse of September 29, 1875
- Followed by: Solar eclipse of May 31, 2049

=== Solar eclipses of 1961–1964 ===
This eclipse is a member of a semester series. An eclipse in a semester series of solar eclipses repeats approximately every 177 days and 4 hours (a semester) at alternating nodes of the Moon's orbit.

The partial solar eclipses on June 10, 1964 and December 4, 1964 occur in the next lunar year eclipse set.

Solar eclipse series sets from 1961 to 1964
Descending node			Ascending node		
Saros	Map	Gamma	Saros	Map	Gamma
120	February 15, 1961 Total	0.883	125	August 11, 1961 Annular	−0.8859
130	February 5, 1962 Total	0.2107	135	July 31, 1962 Annular	−0.113
140	January 25, 1963 Annular	−0.4898	145	July 20, 1963 Total	0.6571
150	January 14, 1964 Partial	−1.2354	155	July 9, 1964 Partial	1.3623

=== Saros 135 ===
This eclipse is a part of Saros series 135, repeating every 18 years, 11 days, and containing 71 events. The series started with a partial solar eclipse on July 5, 1331. It contains annular eclipses from October 21, 1511 through February 24, 2305; hybrid eclipses on March 8, 2323 and March 18, 2341; and total eclipses from March 29, 2359 through May 22, 2449. The series ends at member 71 as a partial eclipse on August 17, 2593. Its eclipses are tabulated in three columns; every third eclipse in the same column is one exeligmos apart, so they all cast shadows over approximately the same parts of the Earth.

The longest duration of annularity was produced by member 16 at 10 minutes, 41 seconds on December 24, 1601, and the longest duration of totality will be produced by member 62 at 2 minutes, 27 seconds on May 12, 2431. All eclipses in this series occur at the Moon’s ascending node of orbit.

Series members 28–49 occur between 1801 and 2200:
28	29	30
May 5, 1818	May 15, 1836	May 26, 1854
31	32	33
June 6, 1872	June 17, 1890	June 28, 1908
34	35	36
July 9, 1926	July 20, 1944	July 31, 1962
37	38	39
August 10, 1980	August 22, 1998	September 1, 2016
40	42	42
September 12, 2034	September 22, 2052	October 4, 2070
43	44	45
October 14, 2088	October 26, 2106	November 6, 2124
46	47	48
November 17, 2142	November 27, 2160	December 9, 2178
49
December 19, 2196

=== Metonic series ===
The metonic series repeats eclipses every 19 years (6939.69 days), lasting about 5 cycles. Eclipses occur in nearly the same calendar date. In addition, the octon subseries repeats 1/5 of that or every 3.8 years (1387.94 days). All eclipses in this table occur at the Moon's ascending node.

22 eclipse events between December 24, 1916 and July 31, 2000
December 24–25	October 12	July 31–August 1	May 19–20	March 7
111	113	115	117	119
December 24, 1916		July 31, 1924	May 19, 1928	March 7, 1932
121	123	125	127	129
December 25, 1935	October 12, 1939	August 1, 1943	May 20, 1947	March 7, 1951
131	133	135	137	139
December 25, 1954	October 12, 1958	July 31, 1962	May 20, 1966	March 7, 1970
141	143	145	147	149
December 24, 1973	October 12, 1977	July 31, 1981	May 19, 1985	March 7, 1989
151	153	155		
December 24, 1992	October 12, 1996	July 31, 2000		

=== Tritos series ===
This eclipse is a part of a tritos cycle, repeating at alternating nodes every 135 synodic months (≈ 3986.63 days, or 11 years minus 1 month). Their appearance and longitude are irregular due to a lack of synchronization with the anomalistic month (period of perigee), but groupings of 3 tritos cycles (≈ 33 years minus 3 months) come close (≈ 434.044 anomalistic months), so eclipses are similar in these groupings.

Series members between 1801 and 2200
October 9, 1809 (Saros 121)	September 7, 1820 (Saros 122)	August 7, 1831 (Saros 123)	July 8, 1842 (Saros 124)	June 6, 1853 (Saros 125)
May 6, 1864 (Saros 126)	April 6, 1875 (Saros 127)	March 5, 1886 (Saros 128)	February 1, 1897 (Saros 129)	January 3, 1908 (Saros 130)
December 3, 1918 (Saros 131)	November 1, 1929 (Saros 132)	October 1, 1940 (Saros 133)	September 1, 1951 (Saros 134)	July 31, 1962 (Saros 135)
June 30, 1973 (Saros 136)	May 30, 1984 (Saros 137)	April 29, 1995 (Saros 138)	March 29, 2006 (Saros 139)	February 26, 2017 (Saros 140)
January 26, 2028 (Saros 141)	December 26, 2038 (Saros 142)	November 25, 2049 (Saros 143)	October 24, 2060 (Saros 144)	September 23, 2071 (Saros 145)
August 24, 2082 (Saros 146)	July 23, 2093 (Saros 147)	June 22, 2104 (Saros 148)	May 24, 2115 (Saros 149)	April 22, 2126 (Saros 150)
March 21, 2137 (Saros 151)	February 19, 2148 (Saros 152)	January 19, 2159 (Saros 153)	December 18, 2169 (Saros 154)	November 17, 2180 (Saros 155)
October 18, 2191 (Saros 156)

=== Inex series ===
This eclipse is a part of the long period inex cycle, repeating at alternating nodes, every 358 synodic months (≈ 10,571.95 days, or 29 years minus 20 days). Their appearance and longitude are irregular due to a lack of synchronization with the anomalistic month (period of perigee). However, groupings of 3 inex cycles (≈ 87 years minus 2 months) comes close (≈ 1,151.02 anomalistic months), so eclipses are similar in these groupings.

Series members between 1801 and 2200
November 9, 1817 (Saros 130)	October 20, 1846 (Saros 131)	September 29, 1875 (Saros 132)
September 9, 1904 (Saros 133)	August 21, 1933 (Saros 134)	July 31, 1962 (Saros 135)
July 11, 1991 (Saros 136)	June 21, 2020 (Saros 137)	May 31, 2049 (Saros 138)
May 11, 2078 (Saros 139)	April 23, 2107 (Saros 140)	April 1, 2136 (Saros 141)
March 12, 2165 (Saros 142)	February 21, 2194 (Saros 143)	
