= Solar eclipse of January 3, 1908 =

Total eclipse

- Total eclipse
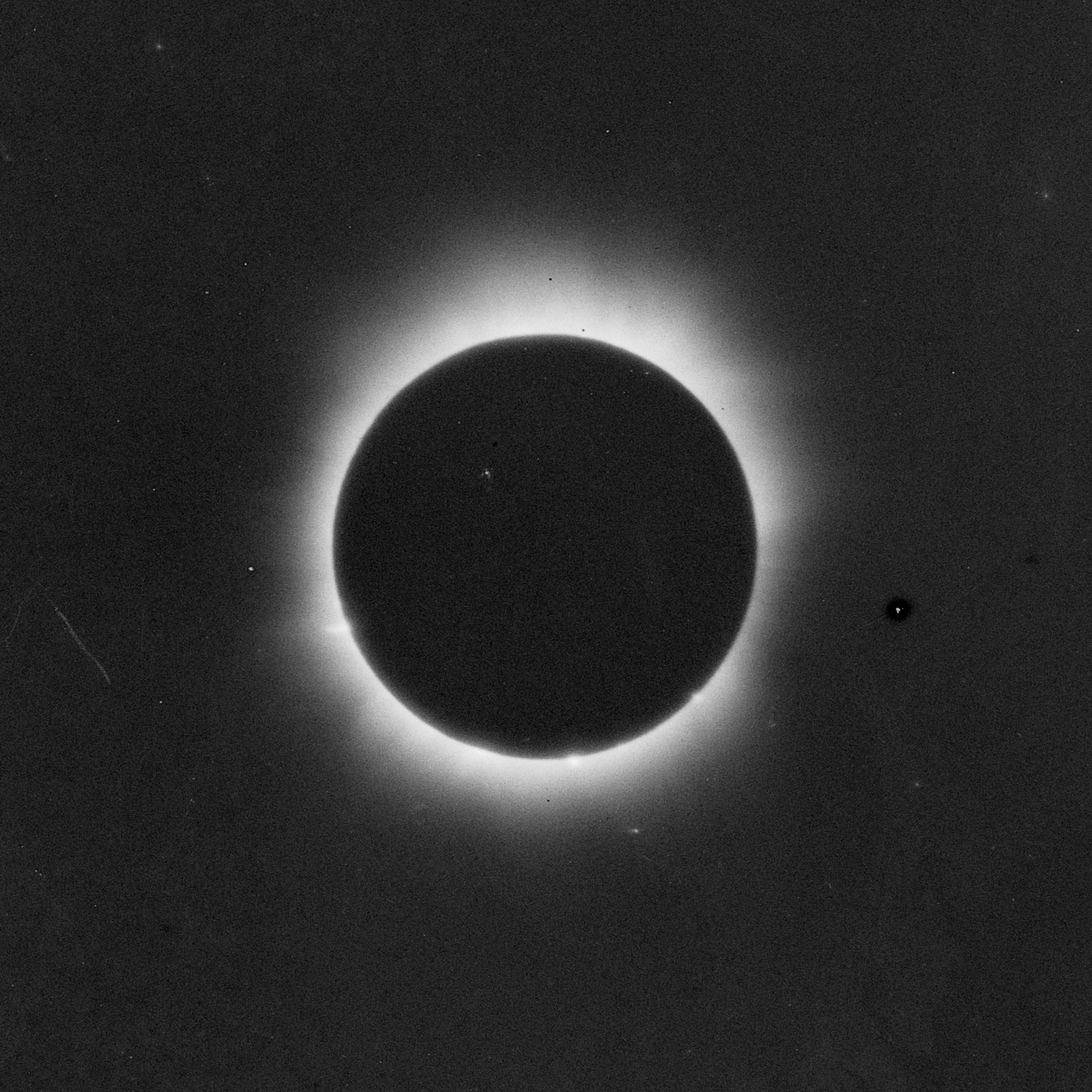
- Totality from Flint Island

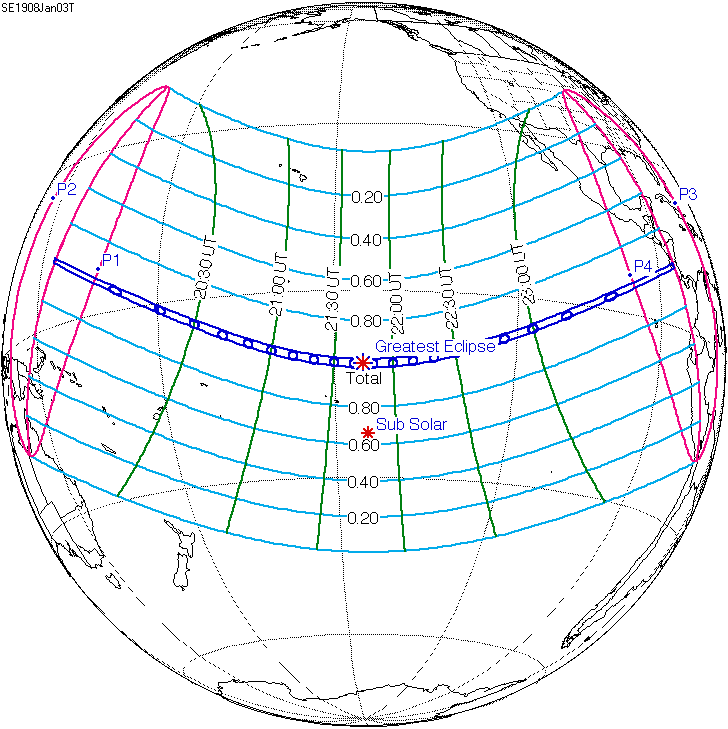
- Map
- Gamma: 0.1934
- Magnitude: 1.0437

Maximum eclipse
- Duration: 254 s (4 min 14 s)
- Coordinates: 11.8°S 145.1°W
- Max. width of band: 149 km (93 mi)

Times (UTC)
- Greatest eclipse: 21:45:22

References
- Saros: 130 (46 of 73)
- Catalog # (SE5000): 9299

A total solar eclipse occurred at the Moon's descending node of orbit between Friday, January 3 and Saturday, January 4, 1908, with a magnitude of 1.0437. A solar eclipse occurs when the Moon passes between Earth and the Sun, thereby totally or partly obscuring the image of the Sun for a viewer on Earth. A total solar eclipse occurs when the Moon's apparent diameter is larger than the Sun's, blocking all direct sunlight, turning day into darkness. Totality occurs in a narrow path across Earth's surface, with the partial solar eclipse visible over a surrounding region thousands of kilometres wide. Occurring about 14 hours before perigee (on January 4, 1908, at 12:30 UTC), the Moon's apparent diameter was larger.

Totality was visible from Ebon Atoll in German New Guinea (now in Marshall Islands), the Line and Phoenix Islands (now in Kiribati) on January 4 (Saturday), and Costa Rica on January 3 (Friday). A partial eclipse was visible for parts of northern Oceania, Hawaii, southern North America, Central America, the western Caribbean, and western South America.

== Observations ==
The eclipse was observed by astronomer William Wallace Campbell of Lick Observatory, viewed from Flint Island, Kiribati, an uninhabited island in the Line Islands. The team of Lick Observatory departed from San Francisco on November 22, 1907, and arrived in Papeete, Tahiti Island, the capital of French Polynesia on December 4. After making preparations of supplies and logistics personnel, it departed again on the evening of December 7 and arrived at Flint Island on the afternoon of 9 December.

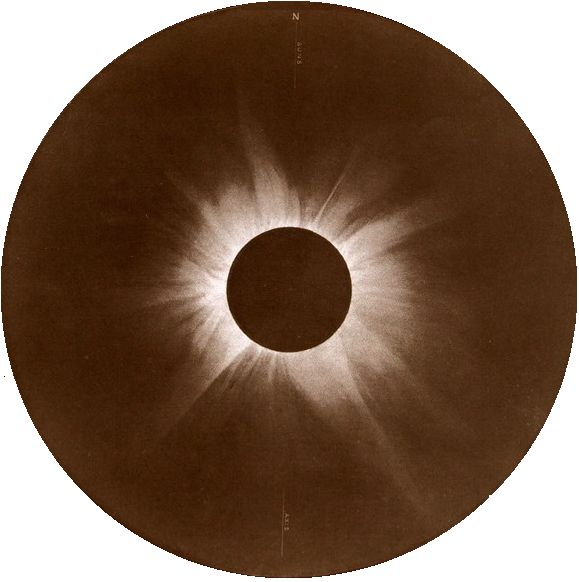

Astronomers from the Royal Astronomical Society, Sydney Observatory and a party from Australia and New Zealand which included Francis McClean and Henry Winkelmann also observed the total eclipse near the observation site of Lick Observatory. The team successfully took images of the corona.

== Eclipse details ==
Shown below are two tables displaying details about this particular solar eclipse. The first table outlines times at which the Moon's penumbra or umbra attains the specific parameter, and the second table describes various other parameters pertaining to this eclipse.

January 3, 1908 Solar Eclipse Times
Event	Time (UTC)
First Penumbral External Contact	1908 January 3 at 19:07:37.2 UTC
First Umbral External Contact	1908 January 3 at 20:03:19.2 UTC
First Central Line	1908 January 3 at 20:04:02.0 UTC
First Umbral Internal Contact	1908 January 3 at 20:04:44.8 UTC
First Penumbral Internal Contact	1908 January 3 at 21:02:14.0 UTC
Ecliptic Conjunction	1908 January 3 at 21:43:22.3 UTC
Equatorial Conjunction	1908 January 3 at 21:45:11.7 UTC
Greatest Eclipse	1908 January 3 at 21:45:21.4 UTC
Greatest Duration	1908 January 3 at 21:45:57.9 UTC
Last Penumbral Internal Contact	1908 January 3 at 22:28:29.5 UTC
Last Umbral Internal Contact	1908 January 3 at 23:25:57.2 UTC
Last Central Line	1908 January 3 at 23:26:40.8 UTC
Last Umbral External Contact	1908 January 3 at 23:27:24.4 UTC
Last Penumbral External Contact	1908 January 4 at 00:23:04.0 UTC

January 3, 1908 Solar Eclipse Parameters
Parameter	Value
Eclipse Magnitude	1.04375
Eclipse Obscuration	1.08941
Gamma	0.19334
Sun Right Ascension	18h52m47.6s
Sun Declination	-22°53'44.4"
Sun Semi-Diameter	16'16.0"
Sun Equatorial Horizontal Parallax	08.9"
Moon Right Ascension	18h52m48.0s
Moon Declination	-22°41'55.4"
Moon Semi-Diameter	16'41.7"
Moon Equatorial Horizontal Parallax	1°01'16.1"
ΔT	7.7 s

== Eclipse season ==
This eclipse is part of an eclipse season, a period, roughly every six months, when eclipses occur. Only two (or occasionally three) eclipse seasons occur each year, and each season lasts about 35 days and repeats just short of six months (173 days) later; thus two full eclipse seasons always occur each year. Either two or three eclipses happen each eclipse season. In the sequence below, each eclipse is separated by a fortnight.

Eclipse season of January 1908
January 3 Descending node (new moon)	January 18 Ascending node (full moon)
Total solar eclipse Solar Saros 130	Penumbral lunar eclipse Lunar Saros 142

== Related eclipses ==
=== Eclipses in 1908 ===
- A total solar eclipse on January 3.
- A penumbral lunar eclipse on January 18.
- A penumbral lunar eclipse on June 14.
- An annular solar eclipse on June 28.
- A penumbral lunar eclipse on July 13.
- A penumbral lunar eclipse on December 7.
- A hybrid solar eclipse on December 23.

=== Metonic ===
- Preceded by: Solar eclipse of March 17, 1904
- Followed by: Solar eclipse of October 22, 1911

=== Tzolkinex ===
- Preceded by: Solar eclipse of November 22, 1900
- Followed by: Solar eclipse of February 14, 1915

=== Half-Saros ===
- Preceded by: Lunar eclipse of December 27, 1898
- Followed by: Lunar eclipse of January 8, 1917

=== Tritos ===
- Preceded by: Solar eclipse of February 1, 1897
- Followed by: Solar eclipse of December 3, 1918

=== Solar Saros 130 ===
- Preceded by: Solar eclipse of December 22, 1889
- Followed by: Solar eclipse of January 14, 1926

=== Inex ===
- Preceded by: Solar eclipse of January 22, 1879
- Followed by: Solar eclipse of December 13, 1936

=== Triad ===
- Preceded by: Solar eclipse of March 4, 1821
- Followed by: Solar eclipse of November 3, 1994

=== Solar eclipses of 1906–1909 ===
This eclipse is a member of a semester series. An eclipse in a semester series of solar eclipses repeats approximately every 177 days and 4 hours (a semester) at alternating nodes of the Moon's orbit.

The partial solar eclipses on February 23, 1906 and August 20, 1906 occur in the previous lunar year eclipse set.

Solar eclipse series sets from 1906 to 1909
Ascending node			Descending node		
Saros	Map	Gamma	Saros	Map	Gamma
115	July 21, 1906 Partial	−1.3637	120	January 14, 1907 Total	0.8628
125	July 10, 1907 Annular	−0.6313	130	January 3, 1908 Total	0.1934
135	June 28, 1908 Annular	0.1389	140	December 23, 1908 Hybrid	−0.4985
145	June 17, 1909 Hybrid	0.8957	150	December 12, 1909 Partial	−1.2456

=== Saros 130 ===
This eclipse is a part of Saros series 130, repeating every 18 years, 11 days, and containing 73 events. The series started with a partial solar eclipse on August 20, 1096. It contains total eclipses from April 5, 1475 through July 18, 2232. There are no annular or hybrid eclipses in this set. The series ends at member 73 as a partial eclipse on October 25, 2394. Its eclipses are tabulated in three columns; every third eclipse in the same column is one exeligmos apart, so they all cast shadows over approximately the same parts of the Earth.

The longest duration of totality was produced by member 30 at 6 minutes, 41 seconds on July 11, 1619. All eclipses in this series occur at the Moon’s descending node of orbit.

Series members 41–62 occur between 1801 and 2200:
41	42	43
November 9, 1817	November 20, 1835	November 30, 1853
44	45	46
December 12, 1871	December 22, 1889	January 3, 1908
47	48	49
January 14, 1926	January 25, 1944	February 5, 1962
50	51	52
February 16, 1980	February 26, 1998	March 9, 2016
53	54	55
March 20, 2034	March 30, 2052	April 11, 2070
56	57	58
April 21, 2088	May 3, 2106	May 14, 2124
59	60	61
May 25, 2142	June 4, 2160	June 16, 2178
62
June 26, 2196

=== Metonic series ===
The metonic series repeats eclipses every 19 years (6939.69 days), lasting about 5 cycles. Eclipses occur in nearly the same calendar date. In addition, the octon subseries repeats 1/5 of that or every 3.8 years (1387.94 days). All eclipses in this table occur at the Moon's descending node.

22 eclipse events between March 16, 1866 and August 9, 1953
March 16–17	January 1–3	October 20–22	August 9–10	May 27–29
108	110	112	114	116
March 16, 1866			August 9, 1877	May 27, 1881
118	120	122	124	126
March 16, 1885	January 1, 1889	October 20, 1892	August 9, 1896	May 28, 1900
128	130	132	134	136
March 17, 1904	January 3, 1908	October 22, 1911	August 10, 1915	May 29, 1919
138	140	142	144	146
March 17, 1923	January 3, 1927	October 21, 1930	August 10, 1934	May 29, 1938
148	150	152	154	
March 16, 1942	January 3, 1946	October 21, 1949	August 9, 1953	

=== Tritos series ===
This eclipse is a part of a tritos cycle, repeating at alternating nodes every 135 synodic months (≈ 3986.63 days, or 11 years minus 1 month). Their appearance and longitude are irregular due to a lack of synchronization with the anomalistic month (period of perigee), but groupings of 3 tritos cycles (≈ 33 years minus 3 months) come close (≈ 434.044 anomalistic months), so eclipses are similar in these groupings.

Series members between 1801 and 2200
October 9, 1809 (Saros 121)	September 7, 1820 (Saros 122)	August 7, 1831 (Saros 123)	July 8, 1842 (Saros 124)	June 6, 1853 (Saros 125)
May 6, 1864 (Saros 126)	April 6, 1875 (Saros 127)	March 5, 1886 (Saros 128)	February 1, 1897 (Saros 129)	January 3, 1908 (Saros 130)
December 3, 1918 (Saros 131)	November 1, 1929 (Saros 132)	October 1, 1940 (Saros 133)	September 1, 1951 (Saros 134)	July 31, 1962 (Saros 135)
June 30, 1973 (Saros 136)	May 30, 1984 (Saros 137)	April 29, 1995 (Saros 138)	March 29, 2006 (Saros 139)	February 26, 2017 (Saros 140)
January 26, 2028 (Saros 141)	December 26, 2038 (Saros 142)	November 25, 2049 (Saros 143)	October 24, 2060 (Saros 144)	September 23, 2071 (Saros 145)
August 24, 2082 (Saros 146)	July 23, 2093 (Saros 147)	June 22, 2104 (Saros 148)	May 24, 2115 (Saros 149)	April 22, 2126 (Saros 150)
March 21, 2137 (Saros 151)	February 19, 2148 (Saros 152)	January 19, 2159 (Saros 153)	December 18, 2169 (Saros 154)	November 17, 2180 (Saros 155)
October 18, 2191 (Saros 156)

=== Inex series ===
This eclipse is a part of the long period inex cycle, repeating at alternating nodes, every 358 synodic months (≈ 10,571.95 days, or 29 years minus 20 days). Their appearance and longitude are irregular due to a lack of synchronization with the anomalistic month (period of perigee). However, groupings of 3 inex cycles (≈ 87 years minus 2 months) comes close (≈ 1,151.02 anomalistic months), so eclipses are similar in these groupings.

Series members between 1801 and 2200
March 4, 1821 (Saros 127)	February 12, 1850 (Saros 128)	January 22, 1879 (Saros 129)
January 3, 1908 (Saros 130)	December 13, 1936 (Saros 131)	November 23, 1965 (Saros 132)
November 3, 1994 (Saros 133)	October 14, 2023 (Saros 134)	September 22, 2052 (Saros 135)
September 3, 2081 (Saros 136)	August 15, 2110 (Saros 137)	July 25, 2139 (Saros 138)
July 5, 2168 (Saros 139)	June 15, 2197 (Saros 140)	
