= Solar eclipse of October 22, 1911 =

20th-century annular solar eclipse

- Annular eclipse
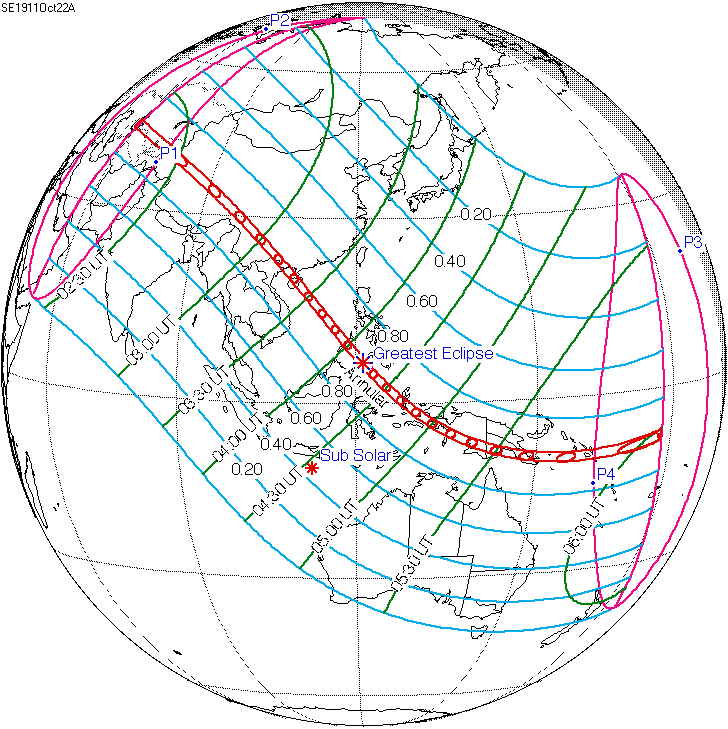
- Map
- Gamma: 0.3224
- Magnitude: 0.965

Maximum eclipse
- Duration: 227 s (3 min 47 s)
- Coordinates: 6.3°N 121.4°E
- Max. width of band: 133 km (83 mi)

Times (UTC)
- Greatest eclipse: 4:13:02

References
- Saros: 132 (40 of 71)
- Catalog # (SE5000): 9307

An annular solar eclipse occurred at the Moon's descending node of orbit on Sunday, October 22, 1911, with a magnitude of 0.965. A solar eclipse occurs when the Moon passes between Earth and the Sun, thereby totally or partly obscuring the image of the Sun for a viewer on Earth. An annular solar eclipse occurs when the Moon's apparent diameter is smaller than the Sun's, blocking most of the Sun's light and causing the Sun to look like an annulus (ring). An annular eclipse appears as a partial eclipse over a region of the Earth thousands of kilometres wide. Occurring about 5.75 days before apogee (on October 27, 1911, at 22:30 UTC), the Moon's apparent diameter was smaller.

Annularity was visible from the Russian Empire (the parts now belonging to Kazakhstan, Uzbekistan and Kyrgyzstan), China, French Indochina (the part now belonging to Vietnam), Philippines, Dutch East Indies (today's Indonesia), Territory of Papua (now belonging to Papua New Guinea) including the capital city Port Moresby, and the British Solomon Islands and Ellice Islands, including the capitals of Honiara and Tulagi. A partial eclipse was visible for parts of South Asia, Southeast Asia, East Asia, Australia, and Oceania.

== Eclipse details ==
Shown below are two tables displaying details about this particular solar eclipse. The first table outlines times at which the Moon's penumbra or umbra attains the specific parameter, and the second table describes various other parameters pertaining to this eclipse.

October 22, 1911 Solar Eclipse Times
Event	Time (UTC)
First Penumbral External Contact	1911 October 22 at 01:19:29.5 UTC
First Umbral External Contact	1911 October 22 at 02:23:49.9 UTC
First Central Line	1911 October 22 at 02:25:31.6 UTC
First Umbral Internal Contact	1911 October 22 at 02:27:13.6 UTC
First Penumbral Internal Contact	1911 October 22 at 03:39:33.3 UTC
Equatorial Conjunction	1911 October 22 at 03:54:33.7 UTC
Ecliptic Conjunction	1911 October 22 at 04:09:22.2 UTC
Greatest Eclipse	1911 October 22 at 04:13:02.1 UTC
Last Penumbral Internal Contact	1911 October 22 at 04:46:55.9 UTC
Greatest Duration	1911 October 22 at 04:53:44.9 UTC
Last Umbral Internal Contact	1911 October 22 at 05:59:00.0 UTC
Last Central Line	1911 October 22 at 06:00:44.7 UTC
Last Umbral External Contact	1911 October 22 at 06:02:29.3 UTC
Last Penumbral External Contact	1911 October 22 at 07:06:48.6 UTC

October 22, 1911 Solar Eclipse Parameters
Parameter	Value
Eclipse Magnitude	0.96497
Eclipse Obscuration	0.93116
Gamma	0.32241
Sun Right Ascension	13h42m39.4s
Sun Declination	-10°38'28.3"
Sun Semi-Diameter	16'04.4"
Sun Equatorial Horizontal Parallax	08.8"
Moon Right Ascension	13h43m12.3s
Moon Declination	-10°22'21.8"
Moon Semi-Diameter	15'16.9"
Moon Equatorial Horizontal Parallax	0°56'05.1"
ΔT	13.0 s

== Eclipse season ==
This eclipse is part of an eclipse season, a period, roughly every six months, when eclipses occur. Only two (or occasionally three) eclipse seasons occur each year, and each season lasts about 35 days and repeats just short of six months (173 days) later; thus two full eclipse seasons always occur each year. Either two or three eclipses happen each eclipse season. In the sequence below, each eclipse is separated by a fortnight.

Eclipse season of October–November 1911
October 22 Descending node (new moon)	November 6 Ascending node (full moon)
Total solar eclipse Solar Saros 132	Penumbral lunar eclipse Lunar Saros 144

== Related eclipses ==
=== Eclipses in 1911 ===
- A total solar eclipse on April 28.
- A penumbral lunar eclipse on May 13.
- An annular solar eclipse on October 22.
- A penumbral lunar eclipse on November 6.

=== Metonic ===
- Preceded by: Solar eclipse of January 3, 1908
- Followed by: Solar eclipse of August 10, 1915

=== Tzolkinex ===
- Preceded by: Solar eclipse of September 9, 1904
- Followed by: Solar eclipse of December 3, 1918

=== Half-Saros ===
- Preceded by: Lunar eclipse of October 17, 1902
- Followed by: Lunar eclipse of October 27, 1920

=== Tritos ===
- Preceded by: Solar eclipse of November 22, 1900
- Followed by: Solar eclipse of September 21, 1922

=== Solar Saros 132 ===
- Preceded by: Solar eclipse of October 9, 1893
- Followed by: Solar eclipse of November 1, 1929

=== Inex ===
- Preceded by: Solar eclipse of November 10, 1882
- Followed by: Solar eclipse of October 1, 1940

=== Triad ===
- Preceded by: Solar eclipse of December 20, 1824
- Followed by: Solar eclipse of August 22, 1998

=== Solar eclipses of 1910–1913 ===
This eclipse is a member of a semester series. An eclipse in a semester series of solar eclipses repeats approximately every 177 days and 4 hours (a semester) at alternating nodes of the Moon's orbit.

The partial solar eclipse on August 31, 1913 occurs in the next lunar year eclipse set.

Solar eclipse series sets from 1910 to 1913
Ascending node			Descending node		
Saros	Map	Gamma	Saros	Map	Gamma
117	May 9, 1910 Total	−0.9437	122	November 2, 1910 Partial	1.0603
127	April 28, 1911 Total	−0.2294	132	October 22, 1911 Annular	0.3224
137	April 17, 1912 Hybrid	0.528	142	October 10, 1912 Total	−0.4149
147	April 6, 1913 Partial	1.3147	152	September 30, 1913 Partial	−1.1005

=== Saros 132 ===
This eclipse is a part of Saros series 132, repeating every 18 years, 11 days, and containing 71 events. The series started with a partial solar eclipse on August 13, 1208. It contains annular eclipses from March 17, 1569 through March 12, 2146; hybrid eclipses on March 23, 2164 and April 3, 2182; and total eclipses from April 14, 2200 through June 19, 2308. The series ends at member 71 as a partial eclipse on September 25, 2470. Its eclipses are tabulated in three columns; every third eclipse in the same column is one exeligmos apart, so they all cast shadows over approximately the same parts of the Earth.

The longest duration of annularity was produced by member 25 at 6 minutes, 56 seconds on May 9, 1641, and the longest duration of totality will be produced by member 61 at 2 minutes, 14 seconds on June 8, 2290. All eclipses in this series occur at the Moon’s descending node of orbit.

Series members 34–56 occur between 1801 and 2200:
34	35	36
August 17, 1803	August 27, 1821	September 7, 1839
37	38	39
September 18, 1857	September 29, 1875	October 9, 1893
40	41	42
October 22, 1911	November 1, 1929	November 12, 1947
43	44	45
November 23, 1965	December 4, 1983	December 14, 2001
46	47	48
December 26, 2019	January 5, 2038	January 16, 2056
49	50	51
January 27, 2074	February 7, 2092	February 18, 2110
52	53	54
March 1, 2128	March 12, 2146	March 23, 2164
55	56	
April 3, 2182	April 14, 2200	

=== Metonic series ===
The metonic series repeats eclipses every 19 years (6939.69 days), lasting about 5 cycles. Eclipses occur in nearly the same calendar date. In addition, the octon subseries repeats 1/5 of that or every 3.8 years (1387.94 days). All eclipses in this table occur at the Moon's descending node.

22 eclipse events between March 16, 1866 and August 9, 1953
March 16–17	January 1–3	October 20–22	August 9–10	May 27–29
108	110	112	114	116
March 16, 1866			August 9, 1877	May 27, 1881
118	120	122	124	126
March 16, 1885	January 1, 1889	October 20, 1892	August 9, 1896	May 28, 1900
128	130	132	134	136
March 17, 1904	January 3, 1908	October 22, 1911	August 10, 1915	May 29, 1919
138	140	142	144	146
March 17, 1923	January 3, 1927	October 21, 1930	August 10, 1934	May 29, 1938
148	150	152	154	
March 16, 1942	January 3, 1946	October 21, 1949	August 9, 1953	

=== Tritos series ===
This eclipse is a part of a tritos cycle, repeating at alternating nodes every 135 synodic months (≈ 3986.63 days, or 11 years minus 1 month). Their appearance and longitude are irregular due to a lack of synchronization with the anomalistic month (period of perigee), but groupings of 3 tritos cycles (≈ 33 years minus 3 months) come close (≈ 434.044 anomalistic months), so eclipses are similar in these groupings.

Series members between 1801 and 2200
August 28, 1802 (Saros 122)	July 27, 1813 (Saros 123)	June 26, 1824 (Saros 124)	May 27, 1835 (Saros 125)	April 25, 1846 (Saros 126)
March 25, 1857 (Saros 127)	February 23, 1868 (Saros 128)	January 22, 1879 (Saros 129)	December 22, 1889 (Saros 130)	November 22, 1900 (Saros 131)
October 22, 1911 (Saros 132)	September 21, 1922 (Saros 133)	August 21, 1933 (Saros 134)	July 20, 1944 (Saros 135)	June 20, 1955 (Saros 136)
May 20, 1966 (Saros 137)	April 18, 1977 (Saros 138)	March 18, 1988 (Saros 139)	February 16, 1999 (Saros 140)	January 15, 2010 (Saros 141)
December 14, 2020 (Saros 142)	November 14, 2031 (Saros 143)	October 14, 2042 (Saros 144)	September 12, 2053 (Saros 145)	August 12, 2064 (Saros 146)
July 13, 2075 (Saros 147)	June 11, 2086 (Saros 148)	May 11, 2097 (Saros 149)	April 11, 2108 (Saros 150)	March 11, 2119 (Saros 151)
February 8, 2130 (Saros 152)	January 8, 2141 (Saros 153)	December 8, 2151 (Saros 154)	November 7, 2162 (Saros 155)	October 7, 2173 (Saros 156)
September 4, 2184 (Saros 157)	August 5, 2195 (Saros 158)			

=== Inex series ===
This eclipse is a part of the long period inex cycle, repeating at alternating nodes, every 358 synodic months (≈ 10,571.95 days, or 29 years minus 20 days). Their appearance and longitude are irregular due to a lack of synchronization with the anomalistic month (period of perigee). However, groupings of 3 inex cycles (≈ 87 years minus 2 months) comes close (≈ 1,151.02 anomalistic months), so eclipses are similar in these groupings.

Series members between 1801 and 2200
December 20, 1824 (Saros 129)	November 30, 1853 (Saros 130)	November 10, 1882 (Saros 131)
October 22, 1911 (Saros 132)	October 1, 1940 (Saros 133)	September 11, 1969 (Saros 134)
August 22, 1998 (Saros 135)	August 2, 2027 (Saros 136)	July 12, 2056 (Saros 137)
June 22, 2085 (Saros 138)	June 3, 2114 (Saros 139)	May 14, 2143 (Saros 140)
April 23, 2172 (Saros 141)		
