= Solar eclipse of December 13, 1936 =

20th-century annular solar eclipse

- Annular eclipse
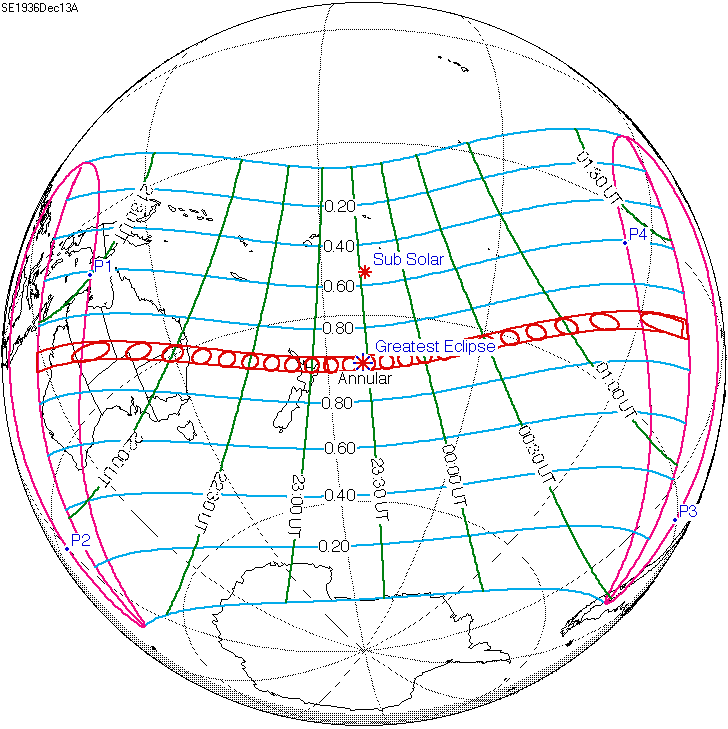
- Map
- Gamma: −0.2493
- Magnitude: 0.9349

Maximum eclipse
- Duration: 445 s (7 min 25 s)
- Coordinates: 37.8°S 172.6°W
- Max. width of band: 251 km (156 mi)

Times (UTC)
- Greatest eclipse: 23:28:12

References
- Saros: 131 (46 of 70)
- Catalog # (SE5000): 9368

An annular solar eclipse occurred at the Moon's ascending node of orbit between Sunday, December 13 and Monday, December 14, 1936, with a magnitude of 0.9349. A solar eclipse occurs when the Moon passes between Earth and the Sun, thereby totally or partly obscuring the image of the Sun for a viewer on Earth. An annular solar eclipse occurs when the Moon's apparent diameter is smaller than the Sun's, blocking most of the Sun's light and causing the Sun to look like an annulus (ring). An annular eclipse appears as a partial eclipse over a region of the Earth thousands of kilometres wide. Occurring about 4.1 days after apogee (on December 9, 1936, at 20:00 UTC), the Moon's apparent diameter was larger.

Annularity was visible from Australia and New Zealand on December 14 (Monday), and Oeno Island in the Pitcairn Islands on December 13 (Sunday). A partial eclipse was visible for parts of Australia, Oceania, and Antarctica.

== Eclipse details ==
Shown below are two tables displaying details about this particular solar eclipse. The first table outlines times at which the Moon's penumbra or umbra attains the specific parameter, and the second table describes various other parameters pertaining to this eclipse.

December 13, 1936 Solar Eclipse Times
Event	Time (UTC)
First Penumbral External Contact	1936 December 13 at 20:27:13.0 UTC
First Umbral External Contact	1936 December 13 at 21:32:18.0 UTC
First Central Line	1936 December 13 at 21:35:09.5 UTC
First Umbral Internal Contact	1936 December 13 at 21:38:01.1 UTC
First Penumbral Internal Contact	1936 December 13 at 22:47:25.8 UTC
Greatest Duration	1936 December 13 at 23:24:56.8 UTC
Ecliptic Conjunction	1936 December 13 at 23:25:14.8 UTC
Equatorial Conjunction	1936 December 13 at 23:27:03.5 UTC
Greatest Eclipse	1936 December 13 at 23:28:11.7 UTC
Last Penumbral Internal Contact	1936 December 14 at 00:09:00.2 UTC
Last Umbral Internal Contact	1936 December 14 at 01:18:24.6 UTC
Last Central Line	1936 December 14 at 01:21:14.0 UTC
Last Umbral External Contact	1936 December 14 at 01:24:03.0 UTC
Last Penumbral External Contact	1936 December 14 at 02:29:05.6 UTC

December 13, 1936 Solar Eclipse Parameters
Parameter	Value
Eclipse Magnitude	0.93493
Eclipse Obscuration	0.87409
Gamma	−0.24927
Sun Right Ascension	17h24m20.6s
Sun Declination	-23°11'38.5"
Sun Semi-Diameter	16'15.0"
Sun Equatorial Horizontal Parallax	08.9"
Moon Right Ascension	17h24m23.0s
Moon Declination	-23°25'17.2"
Moon Semi-Diameter	14'58.2"
Moon Equatorial Horizontal Parallax	0°54'56.3"
ΔT	23.9 s

== Eclipse season ==
This eclipse is part of an eclipse season, a period, roughly every six months, when eclipses occur. Only two (or occasionally three) eclipse seasons occur each year, and each season lasts about 35 days and repeats just short of six months (173 days) later; thus two full eclipse seasons always occur each year. Either two or three eclipses happen each eclipse season. In the sequence below, each eclipse is separated by a fortnight.

Eclipse season of December 1936
December 13 Ascending node (new moon)	December 28 Descending node (full moon)
Annular solar eclipse Solar Saros 131	Penumbral lunar eclipse Lunar Saros 143

== Related eclipses ==
=== Eclipses in 1936 ===
- A total lunar eclipse on January 8.
- A total solar eclipse on June 19.
- A partial lunar eclipse on July 4.
- An annular solar eclipse on December 13.
- A penumbral lunar eclipse on December 28.

=== Metonic ===
- Preceded by: Solar eclipse of February 24, 1933
- Followed by: Solar eclipse of October 1, 1940

=== Tzolkinex ===
- Preceded by: Solar eclipse of November 1, 1929
- Followed by: Solar eclipse of January 25, 1944

=== Half-Saros ===
- Preceded by: Lunar eclipse of December 8, 1927
- Followed by: Lunar eclipse of December 19, 1945

=== Tritos ===
- Preceded by: Solar eclipse of January 14, 1926
- Followed by: Solar eclipse of November 12, 1947

=== Solar Saros 131 ===
- Preceded by: Solar eclipse of December 3, 1918
- Followed by: Solar eclipse of December 25, 1954

=== Inex ===
- Preceded by: Solar eclipse of January 3, 1908
- Followed by: Solar eclipse of November 23, 1965

=== Triad ===
- Preceded by: Solar eclipse of February 12, 1850
- Followed by: Solar eclipse of October 14, 2023

=== Solar eclipses of 1935–1938 ===
This eclipse is a member of a semester series. An eclipse in a semester series of solar eclipses repeats approximately every 177 days and 4 hours (a semester) at alternating nodes of the Moon's orbit.

The partial solar eclipses on February 3, 1935 and July 30, 1935 occur in the previous lunar year eclipse set.

Solar eclipse series sets from 1935 to 1938
Ascending node			Descending node		
Saros	Map	Gamma	Saros	Map	Gamma
111	January 5, 1935 Partial	−1.5381	116	June 30, 1935 Partial	1.3623
121	December 25, 1935 Annular	−0.9228	126	June 19, 1936 Total	0.5389
131	December 13, 1936 Annular	−0.2493	136 Totality in Kanton Island, Kiribati	June 8, 1937 Total	−0.2253
141	December 2, 1937 Annular	0.4389	146	May 29, 1938 Total	−0.9607
151	November 21, 1938 Partial	1.1077			

=== Saros 131 ===
This eclipse is a part of Saros series 131, repeating every 18 years, 11 days, and containing 70 events. The series started with a partial solar eclipse on August 1, 1125. It contains total eclipses from March 27, 1522 through May 30, 1612; hybrid eclipses from June 10, 1630 through July 24, 1702; and annular eclipses from August 4, 1720 through June 18, 2243. The series ends at member 70 as a partial eclipse on September 2, 2369. Its eclipses are tabulated in three columns; every third eclipse in the same column is one exeligmos apart, so they all cast shadows over approximately the same parts of the Earth.

The longest duration of totality was produced by member 28 at 58 seconds on May 30, 1612, and the longest duration of annularity was produced by member 50 at 7 minutes, 54 seconds on January 26, 2009. All eclipses in this series occur at the Moon’s ascending node of orbit.

Series members 39–60 occur between 1801 and 2200:
39	40	41
September 28, 1810	October 9, 1828	October 20, 1846
42	43	44
October 30, 1864	November 10, 1882	November 22, 1900
45	46	47
December 3, 1918	December 13, 1936	December 25, 1954
48	49	50
January 4, 1973	January 15, 1991	January 26, 2009
51	52	53
February 6, 2027	February 16, 2045	February 28, 2063
54	55	56
March 10, 2081	March 21, 2099	April 2, 2117
57	58	59
April 13, 2135	April 23, 2153	May 5, 2171
60
May 15, 2189

=== Metonic series ===
The metonic series repeats eclipses every 19 years (6939.69 days), lasting about 5 cycles. Eclipses occur in nearly the same calendar date. In addition, the octon subseries repeats 1/5 of that or every 3.8 years (1387.94 days). All eclipses in this table occur at the Moon's ascending node.

22 eclipse events between December 13, 1898 and July 20, 1982
December 13–14	October 1–2	July 20–21	May 9	February 24–25
111	113	115	117	119
December 13, 1898		July 21, 1906	May 9, 1910	February 25, 1914
121	123	125	127	129
December 14, 1917	October 1, 1921	July 20, 1925	May 9, 1929	February 24, 1933
131	133	135	137	139
December 13, 1936	October 1, 1940	July 20, 1944	May 9, 1948	February 25, 1952
141	143	145	147	149
December 14, 1955	October 2, 1959	July 20, 1963	May 9, 1967	February 25, 1971
151	153	155		
December 13, 1974	October 2, 1978	July 20, 1982		

=== Tritos series ===
This eclipse is a part of a tritos cycle, repeating at alternating nodes every 135 synodic months (≈ 3986.63 days, or 11 years minus 1 month). Their appearance and longitude are irregular due to a lack of synchronization with the anomalistic month (period of perigee), but groupings of 3 tritos cycles (≈ 33 years minus 3 months) come close (≈ 434.044 anomalistic months), so eclipses are similar in these groupings.

Series members between 1801 and 2200
December 21, 1805 (Saros 119)	November 19, 1816 (Saros 120)	October 20, 1827 (Saros 121)	September 18, 1838 (Saros 122)	August 18, 1849 (Saros 123)
July 18, 1860 (Saros 124)	June 18, 1871 (Saros 125)	May 17, 1882 (Saros 126)	April 16, 1893 (Saros 127)	March 17, 1904 (Saros 128)
February 14, 1915 (Saros 129)	January 14, 1926 (Saros 130)	December 13, 1936 (Saros 131)	November 12, 1947 (Saros 132)	October 12, 1958 (Saros 133)
September 11, 1969 (Saros 134)	August 10, 1980 (Saros 135)	July 11, 1991 (Saros 136)	June 10, 2002 (Saros 137)	May 10, 2013 (Saros 138)
April 8, 2024 (Saros 139)	March 9, 2035 (Saros 140)	February 5, 2046 (Saros 141)	January 5, 2057 (Saros 142)	December 6, 2067 (Saros 143)
November 4, 2078 (Saros 144)	October 4, 2089 (Saros 145)	September 4, 2100 (Saros 146)	August 4, 2111 (Saros 147)	July 4, 2122 (Saros 148)
June 3, 2133 (Saros 149)	May 3, 2144 (Saros 150)	April 2, 2155 (Saros 151)	March 2, 2166 (Saros 152)	January 29, 2177 (Saros 153)
December 29, 2187 (Saros 154)	November 28, 2198 (Saros 155)			

=== Inex series ===
This eclipse is a part of the long period inex cycle, repeating at alternating nodes, every 358 synodic months (≈ 10,571.95 days, or 29 years minus 20 days). Their appearance and longitude are irregular due to a lack of synchronization with the anomalistic month (period of perigee). However, groupings of 3 inex cycles (≈ 87 years minus 2 months) comes close (≈ 1,151.02 anomalistic months), so eclipses are similar in these groupings.

Series members between 1801 and 2200
March 4, 1821 (Saros 127)	February 12, 1850 (Saros 128)	January 22, 1879 (Saros 129)
January 3, 1908 (Saros 130)	December 13, 1936 (Saros 131)	November 23, 1965 (Saros 132)
November 3, 1994 (Saros 133)	October 14, 2023 (Saros 134)	September 22, 2052 (Saros 135)
September 3, 2081 (Saros 136)	August 15, 2110 (Saros 137)	July 25, 2139 (Saros 138)
July 5, 2168 (Saros 139)	June 15, 2197 (Saros 140)	
