= Solar eclipse of October 12, 1958 =

Total eclipse

- Total eclipse
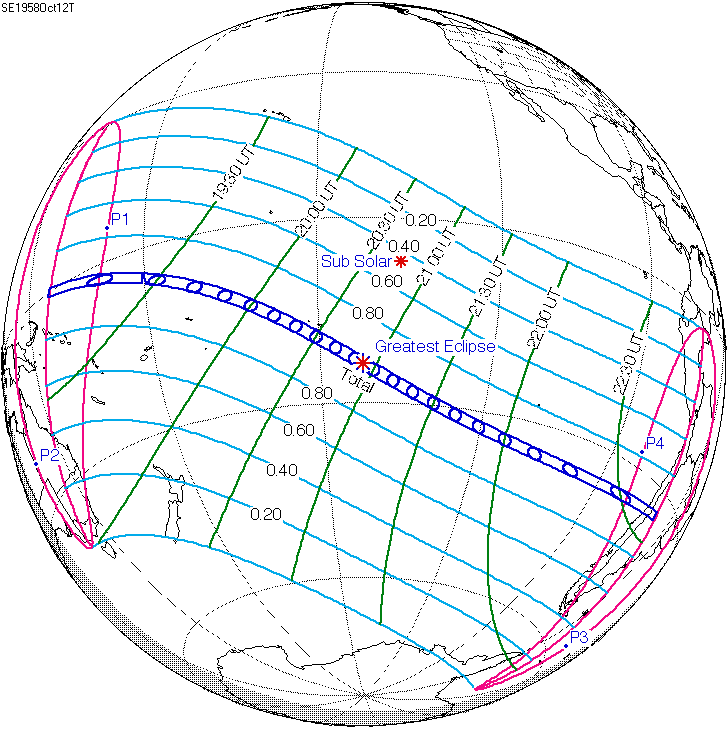
- Map
- Gamma: −0.2951
- Magnitude: 1.0608

Maximum eclipse
- Duration: 311 s (5 min 11 s)
- Coordinates: 24°S 142.4°W
- Max. width of band: 209 km (130 mi)

Times (UTC)
- Greatest eclipse: 20:55:28

References
- Saros: 133 (42 of 72)
- Catalog # (SE5000): 9417

A total solar eclipse occurred at the Moon's ascending node of orbit on Sunday, October 12, 1958, with a magnitude of 1.0608. A solar eclipse occurs when the Moon passes between Earth and the Sun, thereby totally or partly obscuring the image of the Sun for a viewer on Earth. A total solar eclipse occurs when the Moon's apparent diameter is larger than the Sun's, blocking all direct sunlight, turning day into darkness. Totality occurs in a narrow path across Earth's surface, with the partial solar eclipse visible over a surrounding region thousands of kilometres wide. Occurring about 5.5 hours before perigee (on October 13, 1958, at 2:30 UTC), the Moon's apparent diameter was larger.

Totality was visible in Tokelau, Cook Islands, French Polynesia, Chile and Argentina. A partial eclipse was visible for parts of Eastern Australia, Oceania, and western South America.

== Eclipse details ==
Shown below are two tables displaying details about this particular solar eclipse. The first table outlines times at which the Moon's penumbra or umbra attains the specific parameter, and the second table describes various other parameters pertaining to this eclipse.

October 12, 1958 Solar Eclipse Times
Event	Time (UTC)
First Penumbral External Contact	1958 October 12 at 18:20:31.5 UTC
First Umbral External Contact	1958 October 12 at 19:15:58.5 UTC
First Central Line	1958 October 12 at 19:17:11.0 UTC
First Umbral Internal Contact	1958 October 12 at 19:18:23.5 UTC
First Penumbral Internal Contact	1958 October 12 at 20:18:33.1 UTC
Ecliptic Conjunction	1958 October 12 at 20:52:27.4 UTC
Greatest Eclipse	1958 October 12 at 20:55:28.0 UTC
Greatest Duration	1958 October 12 at 20:57:26.1 UTC
Equatorial Conjunction	1958 October 12 at 21:04:31.8 UTC
Last Penumbral Internal Contact	1958 October 12 at 21:32:08.7 UTC
Last Umbral Internal Contact	1958 October 12 at 22:32:25.5 UTC
Last Central Line	1958 October 12 at 22:33:38.3 UTC
Last Umbral External Contact	1958 October 12 at 22:34:51.1 UTC
Last Penumbral External Contact	1958 October 12 at 23:30:19.6 UTC

October 12, 1958 Solar Eclipse Parameters
Parameter	Value
Eclipse Magnitude	1.06084
Eclipse Obscuration	1.12539
Gamma	−0.29506
Sun Right Ascension	13h10m12.6s
Sun Declination	-07°27'01.0"
Sun Semi-Diameter	16'01.8"
Sun Equatorial Horizontal Parallax	08.8"
Moon Right Ascension	13h09m51.7s
Moon Declination	-07°44'19.9"
Moon Semi-Diameter	16'43.7"
Moon Equatorial Horizontal Parallax	1°01'23.7"
ΔT	32.6 s

== Eclipse season ==
This eclipse is part of an eclipse season, a period, roughly every six months, when eclipses occur. Only two (or occasionally three) eclipse seasons occur each year, and each season lasts about 35 days and repeats just short of six months (173 days) later; thus two full eclipse seasons always occur each year. Either two or three eclipses happen each eclipse season. In the sequence below, each eclipse is separated by a fortnight.

Eclipse season of October 1958
October 12 Ascending node (new moon)	October 27 Descending node (full moon)
Total solar eclipse Solar Saros 133	Penumbral lunar eclipse Lunar Saros 145

== Related eclipses ==
=== Eclipses in 1958 ===
- A penumbral lunar eclipse on April 4.
- An annular solar eclipse on April 19.
- A partial lunar eclipse on May 3.
- A total solar eclipse on October 12.
- A penumbral lunar eclipse on October 27.

=== Metonic ===
- Preceded by: Solar eclipse of December 25, 1954
- Followed by: Solar eclipse of July 31, 1962

=== Tzolkinex ===
- Preceded by: Solar eclipse of September 1, 1951
- Followed by: Solar eclipse of November 23, 1965

=== Half-Saros ===
- Preceded by: Lunar eclipse of October 7, 1949
- Followed by: Lunar eclipse of October 18, 1967

=== Tritos ===
- Preceded by: Solar eclipse of November 12, 1947
- Followed by: Solar eclipse of September 11, 1969

=== Solar Saros 133 ===
- Preceded by: Solar eclipse of October 1, 1940
- Followed by: Solar eclipse of October 23, 1976

=== Inex ===
- Preceded by: Solar eclipse of November 1, 1929
- Followed by: Solar eclipse of September 23, 1987

=== Triad ===
- Preceded by: Solar eclipse of December 12, 1871
- Followed by: Solar eclipse of August 12, 2045

=== Solar eclipses of 1957–1960 ===
This eclipse is a member of a semester series. An eclipse in a semester series of solar eclipses repeats approximately every 177 days and 4 hours (a semester) at alternating nodes of the Moon's orbit.

Solar eclipse series sets from 1957 to 1960
Descending node			Ascending node		
Saros	Map	Gamma	Saros	Map	Gamma
118	April 30, 1957 Annular (non-central)	0.9992	123	October 23, 1957 Total (non-central)	1.0022
128	April 19, 1958 Annular	0.275	133	October 12, 1958 Total	−0.2951
138	April 8, 1959 Annular	−0.4546	143	October 2, 1959 Total	0.4207
148	March 27, 1960 Partial	−1.1537	153	September 20, 1960 Partial	1.2057

=== Saros 133 ===
This eclipse is a part of Saros series 133, repeating every 18 years, 11 days, and containing 72 events. The series started with a partial solar eclipse on July 13, 1219. It contains annular eclipses from November 20, 1435 through January 13, 1526; a hybrid eclipse on January 24, 1544; and total eclipses from February 3, 1562 through June 21, 2373. The series ends at member 72 as a partial eclipse on September 5, 2499. Its eclipses are tabulated in three columns; every third eclipse in the same column is one exeligmos apart, so they all cast shadows over approximately the same parts of the Earth.

The longest duration of annularity was produced by member 25 at 1 minutes, 14 seconds on November 30, 1453, and the longest duration of totality was produced by member 61 at 6 minutes, 50 seconds on August 7, 1850. All eclipses in this series occur at the Moon’s ascending node of orbit.

Series members 34–55 occur between 1801 and 2200:
34	35	36
July 17, 1814	July 27, 1832	August 7, 1850
37	38	39
August 18, 1868	August 29, 1886	September 9, 1904
40	41	42
September 21, 1922	October 1, 1940	October 12, 1958
43	44	45
October 23, 1976	November 3, 1994	November 13, 2012
46	47	48
November 25, 2030	December 5, 2048	December 17, 2066
49	50	51
December 27, 2084	January 8, 2103	January 19, 2121
52	53	54
January 30, 2139	February 9, 2157	February 21, 2175
55
March 3, 2193

=== Metonic series ===
The metonic series repeats eclipses every 19 years (6939.69 days), lasting about 5 cycles. Eclipses occur in nearly the same calendar date. In addition, the octon subseries repeats 1/5 of that or every 3.8 years (1387.94 days). All eclipses in this table occur at the Moon's ascending node.

22 eclipse events between December 24, 1916 and July 31, 2000
December 24–25	October 12	July 31–August 1	May 19–20	March 7
111	113	115	117	119
December 24, 1916		July 31, 1924	May 19, 1928	March 7, 1932
121	123	125	127	129
December 25, 1935	October 12, 1939	August 1, 1943	May 20, 1947	March 7, 1951
131	133	135	137	139
December 25, 1954	October 12, 1958	July 31, 1962	May 20, 1966	March 7, 1970
141	143	145	147	149
December 24, 1973	October 12, 1977	July 31, 1981	May 19, 1985	March 7, 1989
151	153	155		
December 24, 1992	October 12, 1996	July 31, 2000		

=== Tritos series ===
This eclipse is a part of a tritos cycle, repeating at alternating nodes every 135 synodic months (≈ 3986.63 days, or 11 years minus 1 month). Their appearance and longitude are irregular due to a lack of synchronization with the anomalistic month (period of perigee), but groupings of 3 tritos cycles (≈ 33 years minus 3 months) come close (≈ 434.044 anomalistic months), so eclipses are similar in these groupings.

Series members between 1801 and 2200
December 21, 1805 (Saros 119)	November 19, 1816 (Saros 120)	October 20, 1827 (Saros 121)	September 18, 1838 (Saros 122)	August 18, 1849 (Saros 123)
July 18, 1860 (Saros 124)	June 18, 1871 (Saros 125)	May 17, 1882 (Saros 126)	April 16, 1893 (Saros 127)	March 17, 1904 (Saros 128)
February 14, 1915 (Saros 129)	January 14, 1926 (Saros 130)	December 13, 1936 (Saros 131)	November 12, 1947 (Saros 132)	October 12, 1958 (Saros 133)
September 11, 1969 (Saros 134)	August 10, 1980 (Saros 135)	July 11, 1991 (Saros 136)	June 10, 2002 (Saros 137)	May 10, 2013 (Saros 138)
April 8, 2024 (Saros 139)	March 9, 2035 (Saros 140)	February 5, 2046 (Saros 141)	January 5, 2057 (Saros 142)	December 6, 2067 (Saros 143)
November 4, 2078 (Saros 144)	October 4, 2089 (Saros 145)	September 4, 2100 (Saros 146)	August 4, 2111 (Saros 147)	July 4, 2122 (Saros 148)
June 3, 2133 (Saros 149)	May 3, 2144 (Saros 150)	April 2, 2155 (Saros 151)	March 2, 2166 (Saros 152)	January 29, 2177 (Saros 153)
December 29, 2187 (Saros 154)	November 28, 2198 (Saros 155)			

=== Inex series ===
This eclipse is a part of the long period inex cycle, repeating at alternating nodes, every 358 synodic months (≈ 10,571.95 days, or 29 years minus 20 days). Their appearance and longitude are irregular due to a lack of synchronization with the anomalistic month (period of perigee). However, groupings of 3 inex cycles (≈ 87 years minus 2 months) comes close (≈ 1,151.02 anomalistic months), so eclipses are similar in these groupings.

Series members between 1801 and 2200
January 21, 1814 (Saros 128)	December 31, 1842 (Saros 129)	December 12, 1871 (Saros 130)
November 22, 1900 (Saros 131)	November 1, 1929 (Saros 132)	October 12, 1958 (Saros 133)
September 23, 1987 (Saros 134)	September 1, 2016 (Saros 135)	August 12, 2045 (Saros 136)
July 24, 2074 (Saros 137)	July 4, 2103 (Saros 138)	June 13, 2132 (Saros 139)
May 25, 2161 (Saros 140)	May 4, 2190 (Saros 141)	
