= Solar eclipse of March 17, 1904 =

20th-century annular solar eclipse

- Annular eclipse
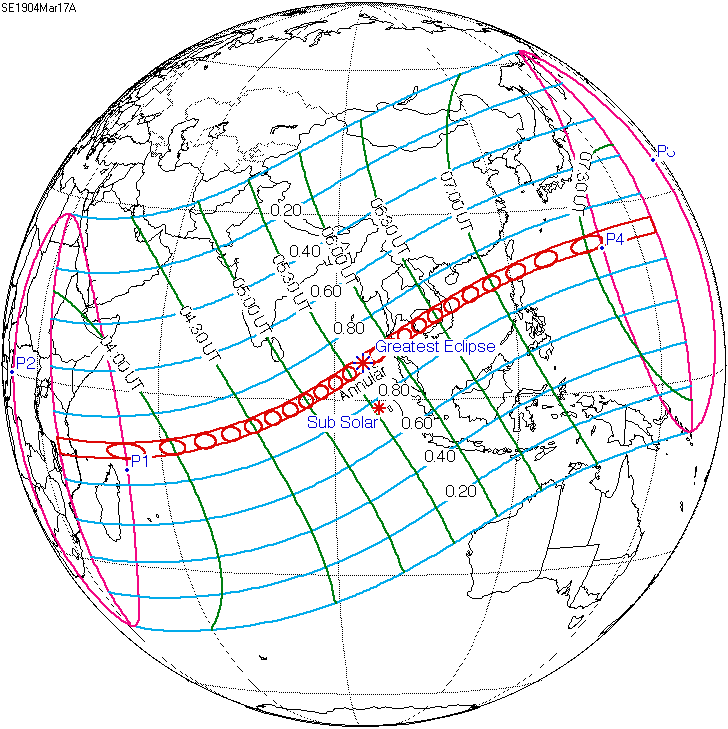
- Map
- Gamma: 0.1299
- Magnitude: 0.9367

Maximum eclipse
- Duration: 487 s (8 min 7 s)
- Coordinates: 5.6°N 94.7°E
- Max. width of band: 237 km (147 mi)

Times (UTC)
- Greatest eclipse: 5:40:44

References
- Saros: 128 (52 of 73)
- Catalog # (SE5000): 9290

An annular solar eclipse occurred at the Moon's descending node of orbit on Thursday, March 17, 1904, with a magnitude of 0.9367. A solar eclipse occurs when the Moon passes between Earth and the Sun, thereby totally or partly obscuring the image of the Sun for a viewer on Earth. An annular solar eclipse occurs when the Moon's apparent diameter is smaller than the Sun's, blocking most of the Sun's light and causing the Sun to look like an annulus (ring). An annular eclipse appears as a partial eclipse over a region of the Earth thousands of kilometres wide. Occurring about 3 days after apogee (on March 14, 1904, at 6:00 UTC), the Moon's apparent diameter was smaller.

The path of annularity covered southern German East Africa (now southern Tanzania), northeastern tip of Portuguese East Africa (now Mozambique), northern Grande Comore Island in French Comoros (now Comoros), southern British Seychelles (now Seychelles), Archipelago of Agaléga which is located far away from the main island of British Mauritius (now Mauritius), most of the British Indian Ocean Territory (excluding the southern part of Diego Garcia), northwestern Sumatra in the Dutch East Indies (now Indonesia), southern Siam (now renamed as Thailand), French Indochina (the part now belonging to Cambodia, the southern tip of Laos and southern Vietnam, including the major city Phnom Penh, now capital of Cambodia), all of the Paracel Islands, the northern tip of the American Philippines (now Philippines) and Japanese remote islands of Iwo Jima, South Iwo Jima and Minamitorishima.

In addition, a partial solar eclipse was seen within a much larger area, including the eastern half of Africa, southern West Asia, southern Afghanistan, South Asia except the northernmost tip of British Raj (now the northernmost tip of Pakistan), most of China except the northwest border, Korean Peninsula, Japan, Southeast Asia, the extreme northern coast of Australia, northwestern Melanesia, central and western Micronesia, and southeastern Russian Empire.

== Observations ==
N. Donitch of the Royal Russian Academy of Sciences (the predecessor of today's Russian Academy of Sciences) traveled to Phnom Penh (now capital of Cambodia) via Saigon (now Ho Chi Minh City, Vietnam) in French Indochina and made observations there. The weather was clear on the eclipse day, with only some fog in the morning. Donitch used a spectrometer and recorded changes in the temperature in about 2.5 hours, which dropped for about 3 °C.

== Eclipse details ==
Shown below are two tables displaying details about this particular solar eclipse. The first table outlines times at which the Moon's penumbra or umbra attains the specific parameter, and the second table describes various other parameters pertaining to this eclipse.

March 17, 1904 Solar Eclipse Times
Event	Time (UTC)
First Penumbral External Contact	1904 March 17 at 02:36:24.1 UTC
First Umbral External Contact	1904 March 17 at 03:41:08.2 UTC
First Central Line	1904 March 17 at 03:43:53.3 UTC
First Umbral Internal Contact	1904 March 17 at 03:46:38.6 UTC
First Penumbral Internal Contact	1904 March 17 at 04:52:21.2 UTC
Greatest Duration	1904 March 17 at 05:37:38.0 UTC
Ecliptic Conjunction	1904 March 17 at 05:39:11.3 UTC
Greatest Eclipse	1904 March 17 at 05:40:44.1 UTC
Equatorial Conjunction	1904 March 17 at 05:45:36.1 UTC
Last Penumbral Internal Contact	1904 March 17 at 06:28:59.4 UTC
Last Umbral Internal Contact	1904 March 17 at 07:34:47.3 UTC
Last Central Line	1904 March 17 at 07:37:30.8 UTC
Last Umbral External Contact	1904 March 17 at 07:40:14.2 UTC
Last Penumbral External Contact	1904 March 17 at 08:44:57.8 UTC

March 17, 1904 Solar Eclipse Parameters
Parameter	Value
Eclipse Magnitude	0.93675
Eclipse Obscuration	0.87751
Gamma	0.12993
Sun Right Ascension	23h46m07.3s
Sun Declination	-01°30'13.7"
Sun Semi-Diameter	16'04.1"
Sun Equatorial Horizontal Parallax	08.8"
Moon Right Ascension	23h45m58.8s
Moon Declination	-01°23'30.5"
Moon Semi-Diameter	14'49.6"
Moon Equatorial Horizontal Parallax	0°54'24.9"
ΔT	2.9 s

== Eclipse season ==
This eclipse is part of an eclipse season, a period, roughly every six months, when eclipses occur. Only two (or occasionally three) eclipse seasons occur each year, and each season lasts about 35 days and repeats just short of six months (173 days) later; thus two full eclipse seasons always occur each year. Either two or three eclipses happen each eclipse season. In the sequence below, each eclipse is separated by a fortnight. The first and last eclipse in this sequence is separated by one synodic month.

Eclipse season of March 1904
March 2 Ascending node (full moon)	March 17 Descending node (new moon)	March 31 Ascending node (full moon)
Penumbral lunar eclipse Lunar Saros 102	Annular solar eclipse Solar Saros 128	Penumbral lunar eclipse Lunar Saros 140

== Related eclipses ==
=== Eclipses in 1904 ===
- A penumbral lunar eclipse on March 2.
- An annular solar eclipse on March 17.
- A penumbral lunar eclipse on March 31.
- A total solar eclipse on September 9.
- A penumbral lunar eclipse on September 24.

=== Metonic ===
- Preceded by: Solar eclipse of May 28, 1900
- Followed by: Solar eclipse of January 3, 1908

=== Tzolkinex ===
- Preceded by: Solar eclipse of February 1, 1897
- Followed by: Solar eclipse of April 28, 1911

=== Half-Saros ===
- Preceded by: Lunar eclipse of March 11, 1895
- Followed by: Lunar eclipse of March 22, 1913

=== Tritos ===
- Preceded by: Solar eclipse of April 16, 1893
- Followed by: Solar eclipse of February 14, 1915

=== Solar Saros 128 ===
- Preceded by: Solar eclipse of March 5, 1886
- Followed by: Solar eclipse of March 28, 1922

=== Inex ===
- Preceded by: Solar eclipse of April 6, 1875
- Followed by: Solar eclipse of February 24, 1933

=== Triad ===
- Preceded by: Solar eclipse of May 16, 1817
- Followed by: Solar eclipse of January 15, 1991

=== Solar eclipses of 1902–1906 ===
This eclipse is a member of a semester series. An eclipse in a semester series of solar eclipses repeats approximately every 177 days and 4 hours (a semester) at alternating nodes of the Moon's orbit.

The partial solar eclipses on May 7, 1902 and October 31, 1902 occur in the previous lunar year eclipse set, and the partial solar eclipse on July 21, 1906 occurs in the next lunar year eclipse set.

Solar eclipse series sets from 1902 to 1906
Descending node			Ascending node		
Saros	Map	Gamma	Saros	Map	Gamma
108	April 8, 1902 Partial	1.5024	113	October 1, 1902	
118	March 29, 1903 Annular	0.8413	123	September 21, 1903 Total	−0.8967
128	March 17, 1904 Annular	0.1299	133	September 9, 1904 Total	−0.1625
138	March 6, 1905 Annular	−0.5768	143	August 30, 1905 Total	0.5708
148	February 23, 1906 Partial	−1.2479	153	August 20, 1906 Partial	1.3731

=== Saros 128 ===
This eclipse is a part of Saros series 128, repeating every 18 years, 11 days, and containing 73 events. The series started with a partial solar eclipse on August 29, 984 AD. It contains total eclipses from May 16, 1417 through June 18, 1471; hybrid eclipses from June 28, 1489 through July 31, 1543; and annular eclipses from August 11, 1561 through July 25, 2120. The series ends at member 73 as a partial eclipse on November 1, 2282. Its eclipses are tabulated in three columns; every third eclipse in the same column is one exeligmos apart, so they all cast shadows over approximately the same parts of the Earth.

The longest duration of totality was produced by member 27 at 1 minutes, 45 seconds on June 7, 1453, and the longest duration of annularity was produced by member 48 at 8 minutes, 35 seconds on February 1, 1832. All eclipses in this series occur at the Moon’s descending node of orbit.

Series members 47–68 occur between 1801 and 2200:
47	48	49
January 21, 1814	February 1, 1832	February 12, 1850
50	51	52
February 23, 1868	March 5, 1886	March 17, 1904
53	54	55
March 28, 1922	April 7, 1940	April 19, 1958
56	57	58
April 29, 1976	May 10, 1994	May 20, 2012
59	60	61
June 1, 2030	June 11, 2048	June 22, 2066
62	63	64
July 3, 2084	July 15, 2102	July 25, 2120
65	66	67
August 5, 2138	August 16, 2156	August 27, 2174
68
September 6, 2192

=== Metonic series ===
The metonic series repeats eclipses every 19 years (6939.69 days), lasting about 5 cycles. Eclipses occur in nearly the same calendar date. In addition, the octon subseries repeats 1/5 of that or every 3.8 years (1387.94 days). All eclipses in this table occur at the Moon's descending node.

22 eclipse events between March 16, 1866 and August 9, 1953
March 16–17	January 1–3	October 20–22	August 9–10	May 27–29
108	110	112	114	116
March 16, 1866			August 9, 1877	May 27, 1881
118	120	122	124	126
March 16, 1885	January 1, 1889	October 20, 1892	August 9, 1896	May 28, 1900
128	130	132	134	136
March 17, 1904	January 3, 1908	October 22, 1911	August 10, 1915	May 29, 1919
138	140	142	144	146
March 17, 1923	January 3, 1927	October 21, 1930	August 10, 1934	May 29, 1938
148	150	152	154	
March 16, 1942	January 3, 1946	October 21, 1949	August 9, 1953	

=== Tritos series ===
This eclipse is a part of a tritos cycle, repeating at alternating nodes every 135 synodic months (≈ 3986.63 days, or 11 years minus 1 month). Their appearance and longitude are irregular due to a lack of synchronization with the anomalistic month (period of perigee), but groupings of 3 tritos cycles (≈ 33 years minus 3 months) come close (≈ 434.044 anomalistic months), so eclipses are similar in these groupings.

Series members between 1801 and 2200
December 21, 1805 (Saros 119)	November 19, 1816 (Saros 120)	October 20, 1827 (Saros 121)	September 18, 1838 (Saros 122)	August 18, 1849 (Saros 123)
July 18, 1860 (Saros 124)	June 18, 1871 (Saros 125)	May 17, 1882 (Saros 126)	April 16, 1893 (Saros 127)	March 17, 1904 (Saros 128)
February 14, 1915 (Saros 129)	January 14, 1926 (Saros 130)	December 13, 1936 (Saros 131)	November 12, 1947 (Saros 132)	October 12, 1958 (Saros 133)
September 11, 1969 (Saros 134)	August 10, 1980 (Saros 135)	July 11, 1991 (Saros 136)	June 10, 2002 (Saros 137)	May 10, 2013 (Saros 138)
April 8, 2024 (Saros 139)	March 9, 2035 (Saros 140)	February 5, 2046 (Saros 141)	January 5, 2057 (Saros 142)	December 6, 2067 (Saros 143)
November 4, 2078 (Saros 144)	October 4, 2089 (Saros 145)	September 4, 2100 (Saros 146)	August 4, 2111 (Saros 147)	July 4, 2122 (Saros 148)
June 3, 2133 (Saros 149)	May 3, 2144 (Saros 150)	April 2, 2155 (Saros 151)	March 2, 2166 (Saros 152)	January 29, 2177 (Saros 153)
December 29, 2187 (Saros 154)	November 28, 2198 (Saros 155)			

=== Inex series ===
This eclipse is a part of the long period inex cycle, repeating at alternating nodes, every 358 synodic months (≈ 10,571.95 days, or 29 years minus 20 days). Their appearance and longitude are irregular due to a lack of synchronization with the anomalistic month (period of perigee). However, groupings of 3 inex cycles (≈ 87 years minus 2 months) comes close (≈ 1,151.02 anomalistic months), so eclipses are similar in these groupings.

Series members between 1801 and 2200
May 16, 1817 (Saros 125)	April 25, 1846 (Saros 126)	April 6, 1875 (Saros 127)
March 17, 1904 (Saros 128)	February 24, 1933 (Saros 129)	February 5, 1962 (Saros 130)
January 15, 1991 (Saros 131)	December 26, 2019 (Saros 132)	December 5, 2048 (Saros 133)
November 15, 2077 (Saros 134)	October 26, 2106 (Saros 135)	October 7, 2135 (Saros 136)
September 16, 2164 (Saros 137)	August 26, 2193 (Saros 138)	
