= Solar eclipse of November 1, 1929 =

20th-century annular solar eclipse

- Annular eclipse
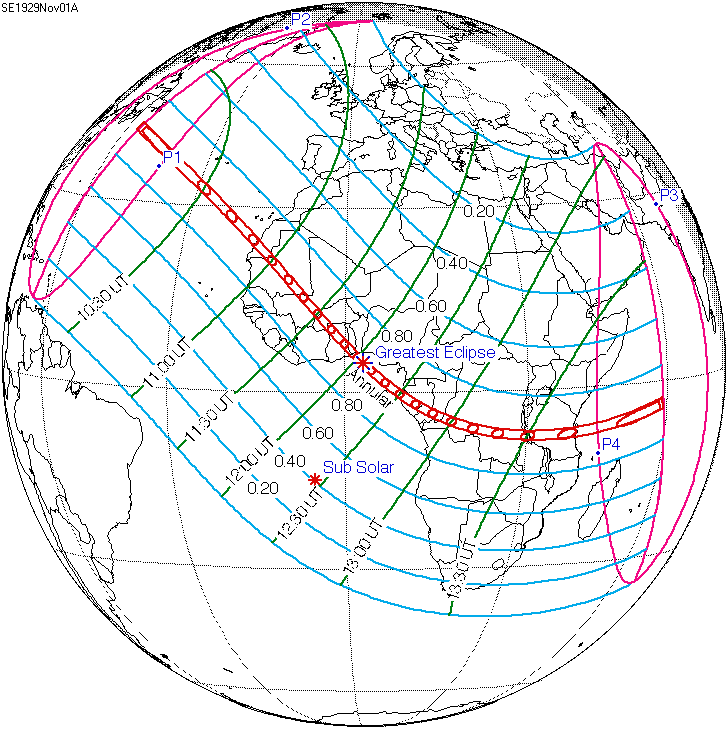
- Map
- Gamma: 0.3514
- Magnitude: 0.9649

Maximum eclipse
- Duration: 234 s (3 min 54 s)
- Coordinates: 4.5°N 3.1°E
- Max. width of band: 134 km (83 mi)

Times (UTC)
- Greatest eclipse: 12:05:10

References
- Saros: 132 (41 of 71)
- Catalog # (SE5000): 9350

An annular solar eclipse occurred at the Moon's descending node of orbit on Friday, November 1, 1929, with a magnitude of 0.9649. A solar eclipse occurs when the Moon passes between Earth and the Sun, thereby totally or partly obscuring the image of the Sun for a viewer on Earth. An annular solar eclipse occurs when the Moon's apparent diameter is smaller than the Sun's, blocking most of the Sun's light and causing the Sun to look like an annulus (ring). An annular eclipse appears as a partial eclipse over a region of the Earth thousands of kilometres wide. Occurring about 6 days before apogee (on November 7, 1929, at 11:00 UTC), the Moon's apparent diameter was smaller.

Annularity was visible from Spanish Sahara (today's West Sahara), French West Africa (parts now belonging to Mauritania, Mali, Burkina Faso, and the southwestern tip of Benin), British Gold Coast (today's Ghana), French Togoland (today's Togo) including capital Lomé, Portuguese São Tomé and Príncipe (today's São Tomé and Príncipe), French Equatorial Africa (parts now belonging to Gabon and R. Congo) including capital Brazzaville, Belgian Congo (today's DR Congo) including capital Léopoldville, Northern Rhodesia (today's Zambia), British Tanganyika (now belonging to Tanzania) including capital Dar es Salaam, and British Seychelles (today's Seychelles) including capital Victoria. A partial eclipse was visible for most of Africa, Europe, and the Middle East.

== Eclipse details ==
Shown below are two tables displaying details about this particular solar eclipse. The first table outlines times at which the Moon's penumbra or umbra attains the specific parameter, and the second table describes various other parameters pertaining to this eclipse.

November 1, 1929 Solar Eclipse Times
Event	Time (UTC)
First Penumbral External Contact	1929 November 1 at 09:12:50.4 UTC
First Umbral External Contact	1929 November 1 at 10:17:25.7 UTC
First Central Line	1929 November 1 at 10:19:08.2 UTC
First Umbral Internal Contact	1929 November 1 at 10:20:50.9 UTC
First Penumbral Internal Contact	1929 November 1 at 11:35:47.0 UTC
Equatorial Conjunction	1929 November 1 at 11:47:03.1 UTC
Ecliptic Conjunction	1929 November 1 at 12:01:11.0 UTC
Greatest Eclipse	1929 November 1 at 12:05:09.8 UTC
Last Penumbral Internal Contact	1929 November 1 at 12:34:57.3 UTC
Greatest Duration	1929 November 1 at 12:41:12.0 UTC
Last Umbral Internal Contact	1929 November 1 at 13:49:37.9 UTC
Last Central Line	1929 November 1 at 13:51:23.5 UTC
Last Umbral External Contact	1929 November 1 at 13:53:08.8 UTC
Last Penumbral External Contact	1929 November 1 at 14:57:43.0 UTC

November 1, 1929 Solar Eclipse Parameters
Parameter	Value
Eclipse Magnitude	0.96489
Eclipse Obscuration	0.93100
Gamma	0.35138
Sun Right Ascension	14h24m49.9s
Sun Declination	-14°22'20.5"
Sun Semi-Diameter	16'07.1"
Sun Equatorial Horizontal Parallax	08.9"
Moon Right Ascension	14h25m23.5s
Moon Declination	-14°04'23.5"
Moon Semi-Diameter	15'19.6"
Moon Equatorial Horizontal Parallax	0°56'14.9"
ΔT	24.0 s

== Eclipse season ==
This eclipse is part of an eclipse season, a period, roughly every six months, when eclipses occur. Only two (or occasionally three) eclipse seasons occur each year, and each season lasts about 35 days and repeats just short of six months (173 days) later; thus two full eclipse seasons always occur each year. Either two or three eclipses happen each eclipse season. In the sequence below, each eclipse is separated by a fortnight.

Eclipse season of November 1929
November 1 Descending node (new moon)	November 17 Ascending node (full moon)
Annular solar eclipse Solar Saros 132	Penumbral lunar eclipse Lunar Saros 144

== Related eclipses ==
=== Eclipses in 1929 ===
- A total solar eclipse on May 9.
- A penumbral lunar eclipse on May 23.
- An annular solar eclipse on November 1.
- A penumbral lunar eclipse on November 17.

=== Metonic ===
- Preceded by: Solar eclipse of January 14, 1926
- Followed by: Solar eclipse of August 21, 1933

=== Tzolkinex ===
- Preceded by: Solar eclipse of September 21, 1922
- Followed by: Solar eclipse of December 13, 1936

=== Half-Saros ===
- Preceded by: Lunar eclipse of October 27, 1920
- Followed by: Lunar eclipse of November 7, 1938

=== Tritos ===
- Preceded by: Solar eclipse of December 3, 1918
- Followed by: Solar eclipse of October 1, 1940

=== Solar Saros 132 ===
- Preceded by: Solar eclipse of October 22, 1911
- Followed by: Solar eclipse of November 12, 1947

=== Inex ===
- Preceded by: Solar eclipse of November 22, 1900
- Followed by: Solar eclipse of October 12, 1958

=== Triad ===
- Preceded by: Solar eclipse of December 31, 1842
- Followed by: Solar eclipse of September 1, 2016

=== Solar eclipses of 1928–1931 ===
This eclipse is a member of a semester series. An eclipse in a semester series of solar eclipses repeats approximately every 177 days and 4 hours (a semester) at alternating nodes of the Moon's orbit.

The partial solar eclipse on June 17, 1928 occurs in the previous lunar year eclipse set, and the partial solar eclipse on September 12, 1931 occurs in the next lunar year eclipse set.

Solar eclipse series sets from 1928 to 1931
Ascending node			Descending node		
Saros	Map	Gamma	Saros	Map	Gamma
117	May 19, 1928 Total (non-central)	1.0048	122	November 12, 1928 Partial	1.0861
127	May 9, 1929 Total	−0.2887	132	November 1, 1929 Annular	0.3514
137	April 28, 1930 Hybrid	0.473	142	October 21, 1930 Total	−0.3804
147	April 18, 1931 Partial	1.2643	152	October 11, 1931 Partial	−1.0607

=== Saros 132 ===
This eclipse is a part of Saros series 132, repeating every 18 years, 11 days, and containing 71 events. The series started with a partial solar eclipse on August 13, 1208. It contains annular eclipses from March 17, 1569 through March 12, 2146; hybrid eclipses on March 23, 2164 and April 3, 2182; and total eclipses from April 14, 2200 through June 19, 2308. The series ends at member 71 as a partial eclipse on September 25, 2470. Its eclipses are tabulated in three columns; every third eclipse in the same column is one exeligmos apart, so they all cast shadows over approximately the same parts of the Earth.

The longest duration of annularity was produced by member 25 at 6 minutes, 56 seconds on May 9, 1641, and the longest duration of totality will be produced by member 61 at 2 minutes, 14 seconds on June 8, 2290. All eclipses in this series occur at the Moon’s descending node of orbit.

Series members 34–56 occur between 1801 and 2200:
34	35	36
August 17, 1803	August 27, 1821	September 7, 1839
37	38	39
September 18, 1857	September 29, 1875	October 9, 1893
40	41	42
October 22, 1911	November 1, 1929	November 12, 1947
43	44	45
November 23, 1965	December 4, 1983	December 14, 2001
46	47	48
December 26, 2019	January 5, 2038	January 16, 2056
49	50	51
January 27, 2074	February 7, 2092	February 18, 2110
52	53	54
March 1, 2128	March 12, 2146	March 23, 2164
55	56	
April 3, 2182	April 14, 2200	

=== Metonic series ===
The metonic series repeats eclipses every 19 years (6939.69 days), lasting about 5 cycles. Eclipses occur in nearly the same calendar date. In addition, the octon subseries repeats 1/5 of that or every 3.8 years (1387.94 days). All eclipses in this table occur at the Moon's descending node.

22 eclipse events between March 27, 1884 and August 20, 1971
March 27–29	January 14	November 1–2	August 20–21	June 8
108	110	112	114	116
March 27, 1884			August 20, 1895	June 8, 1899
118	120	122	124	126
March 29, 1903	January 14, 1907	November 2, 1910	August 21, 1914	June 8, 1918
128	130	132	134	136
March 28, 1922	January 14, 1926	November 1, 1929	August 21, 1933	June 8, 1937
138	140	142	144	146
March 27, 1941	January 14, 1945	November 1, 1948	August 20, 1952	June 8, 1956
148	150	152	154	
March 27, 1960	January 14, 1964	November 2, 1967	August 20, 1971	

=== Tritos series ===
This eclipse is a part of a tritos cycle, repeating at alternating nodes every 135 synodic months (≈ 3986.63 days, or 11 years minus 1 month). Their appearance and longitude are irregular due to a lack of synchronization with the anomalistic month (period of perigee), but groupings of 3 tritos cycles (≈ 33 years minus 3 months) come close (≈ 434.044 anomalistic months), so eclipses are similar in these groupings.

Series members between 1801 and 2200
October 9, 1809 (Saros 121)	September 7, 1820 (Saros 122)	August 7, 1831 (Saros 123)	July 8, 1842 (Saros 124)	June 6, 1853 (Saros 125)
May 6, 1864 (Saros 126)	April 6, 1875 (Saros 127)	March 5, 1886 (Saros 128)	February 1, 1897 (Saros 129)	January 3, 1908 (Saros 130)
December 3, 1918 (Saros 131)	November 1, 1929 (Saros 132)	October 1, 1940 (Saros 133)	September 1, 1951 (Saros 134)	July 31, 1962 (Saros 135)
June 30, 1973 (Saros 136)	May 30, 1984 (Saros 137)	April 29, 1995 (Saros 138)	March 29, 2006 (Saros 139)	February 26, 2017 (Saros 140)
January 26, 2028 (Saros 141)	December 26, 2038 (Saros 142)	November 25, 2049 (Saros 143)	October 24, 2060 (Saros 144)	September 23, 2071 (Saros 145)
August 24, 2082 (Saros 146)	July 23, 2093 (Saros 147)	June 22, 2104 (Saros 148)	May 24, 2115 (Saros 149)	April 22, 2126 (Saros 150)
March 21, 2137 (Saros 151)	February 19, 2148 (Saros 152)	January 19, 2159 (Saros 153)	December 18, 2169 (Saros 154)	November 17, 2180 (Saros 155)
October 18, 2191 (Saros 156)

=== Inex series ===
This eclipse is a part of the long period inex cycle, repeating at alternating nodes, every 358 synodic months (≈ 10,571.95 days, or 29 years minus 20 days). Their appearance and longitude are irregular due to a lack of synchronization with the anomalistic month (period of perigee). However, groupings of 3 inex cycles (≈ 87 years minus 2 months) comes close (≈ 1,151.02 anomalistic months), so eclipses are similar in these groupings.

Series members between 1801 and 2200
January 21, 1814 (Saros 128)	December 31, 1842 (Saros 129)	December 12, 1871 (Saros 130)
November 22, 1900 (Saros 131)	November 1, 1929 (Saros 132)	October 12, 1958 (Saros 133)
September 23, 1987 (Saros 134)	September 1, 2016 (Saros 135)	August 12, 2045 (Saros 136)
July 24, 2074 (Saros 137)	July 4, 2103 (Saros 138)	June 13, 2132 (Saros 139)
May 25, 2161 (Saros 140)	May 4, 2190 (Saros 141)	
