= List of solar eclipses visible from New Zealand =

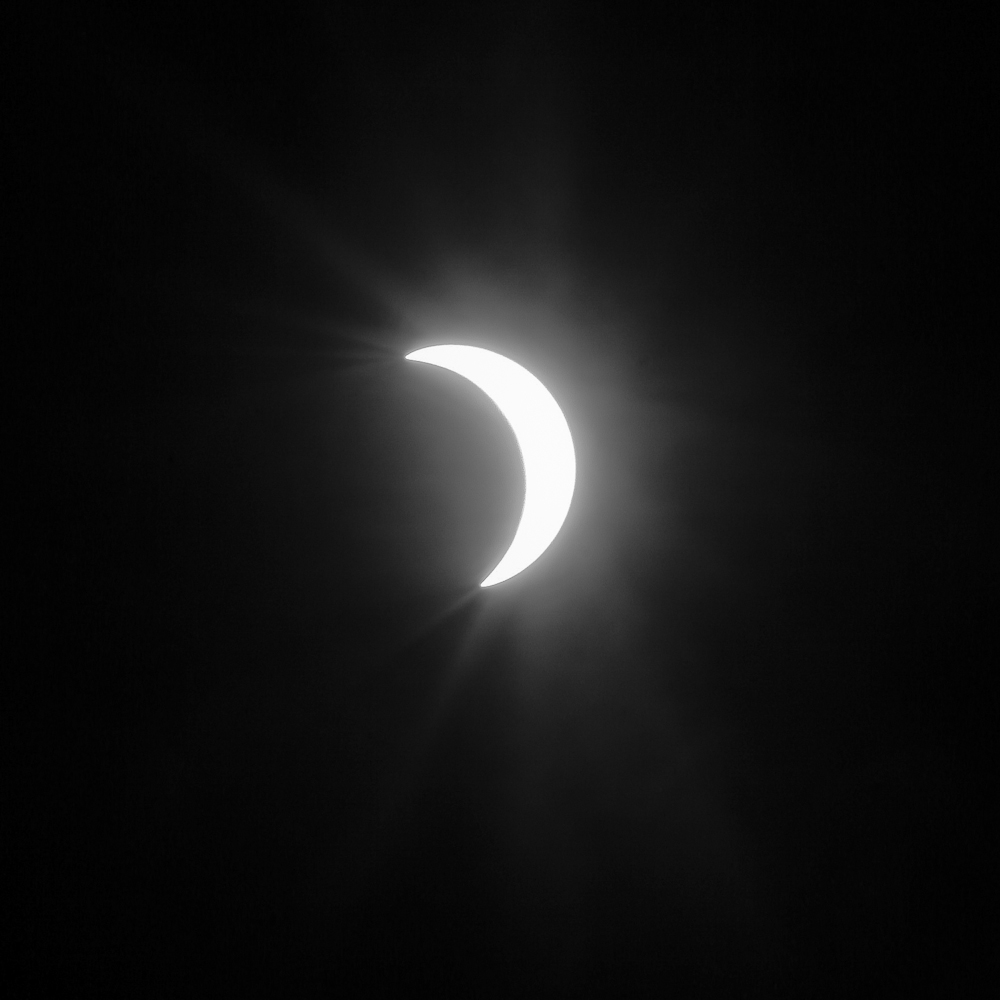
Solar eclipse of 14 November 2012, viewed form Tauranga

The first total solar eclipse visible from New Zealand since European settlement occurred on 9 September 1885.

== List ==
| Date | Notes |
|---|---|
| 14 November 2012 | Partial. Maximum coverage of 87% in Auckland. |
| 10 May 2013 | Maximum coverage of 7.8% in Auckland, 0.6% in Wellington. Not visible in Christchurch. |
| 4 December 2021 | Partial, only visible from the lower South Island. |
| 22 September 2025 | Partial. Maximum coverage of 60–70%. |
| 22 July 2028 | Total solar eclipse in Otago. First total solar eclipse in Dunedin since 1163. |

== See also ==
- List of solar eclipses visible from Australia
