= List of meteorites found in New Zealand =

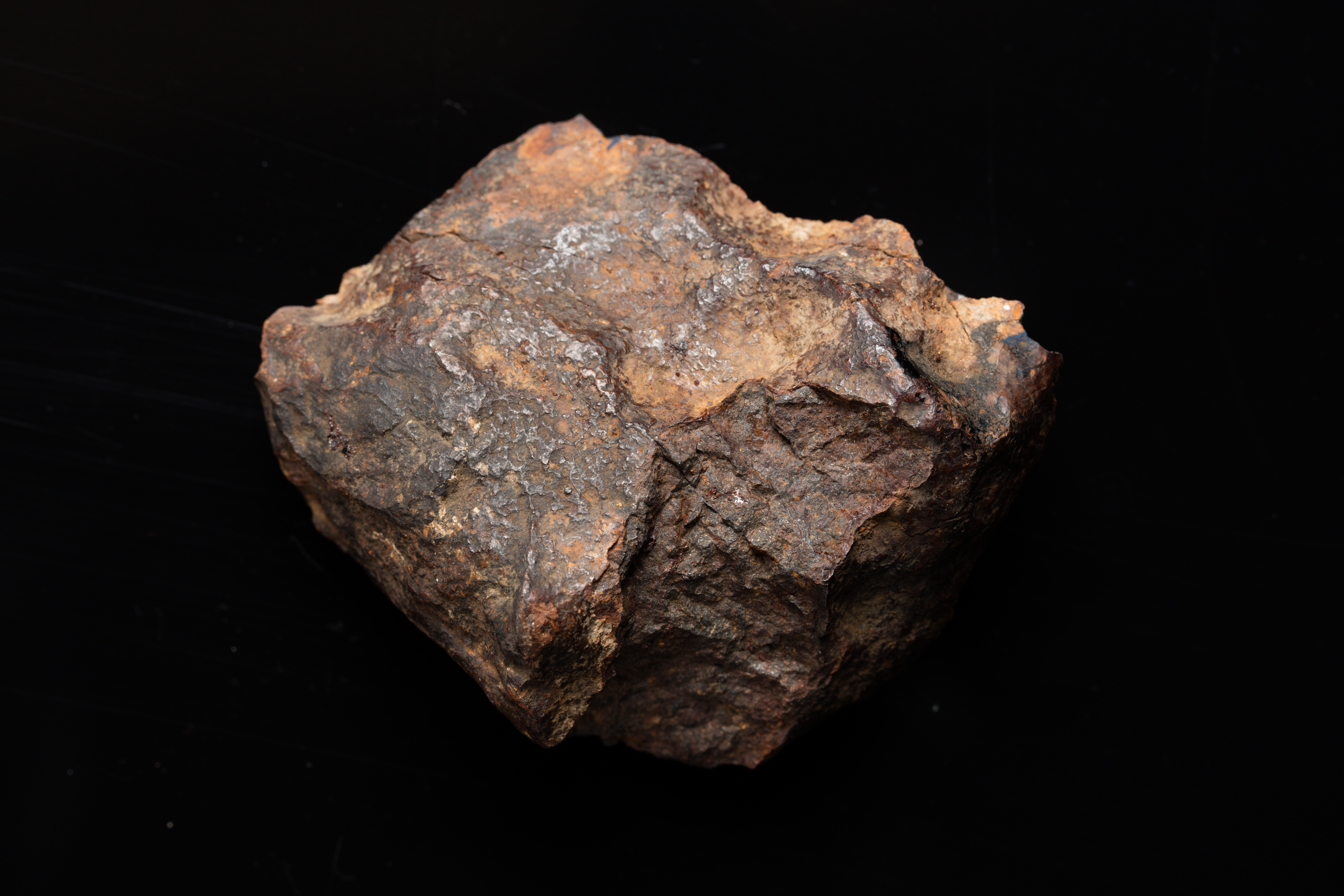
This meteorite was recovered in the Wairarapa in c. 1862–1863.

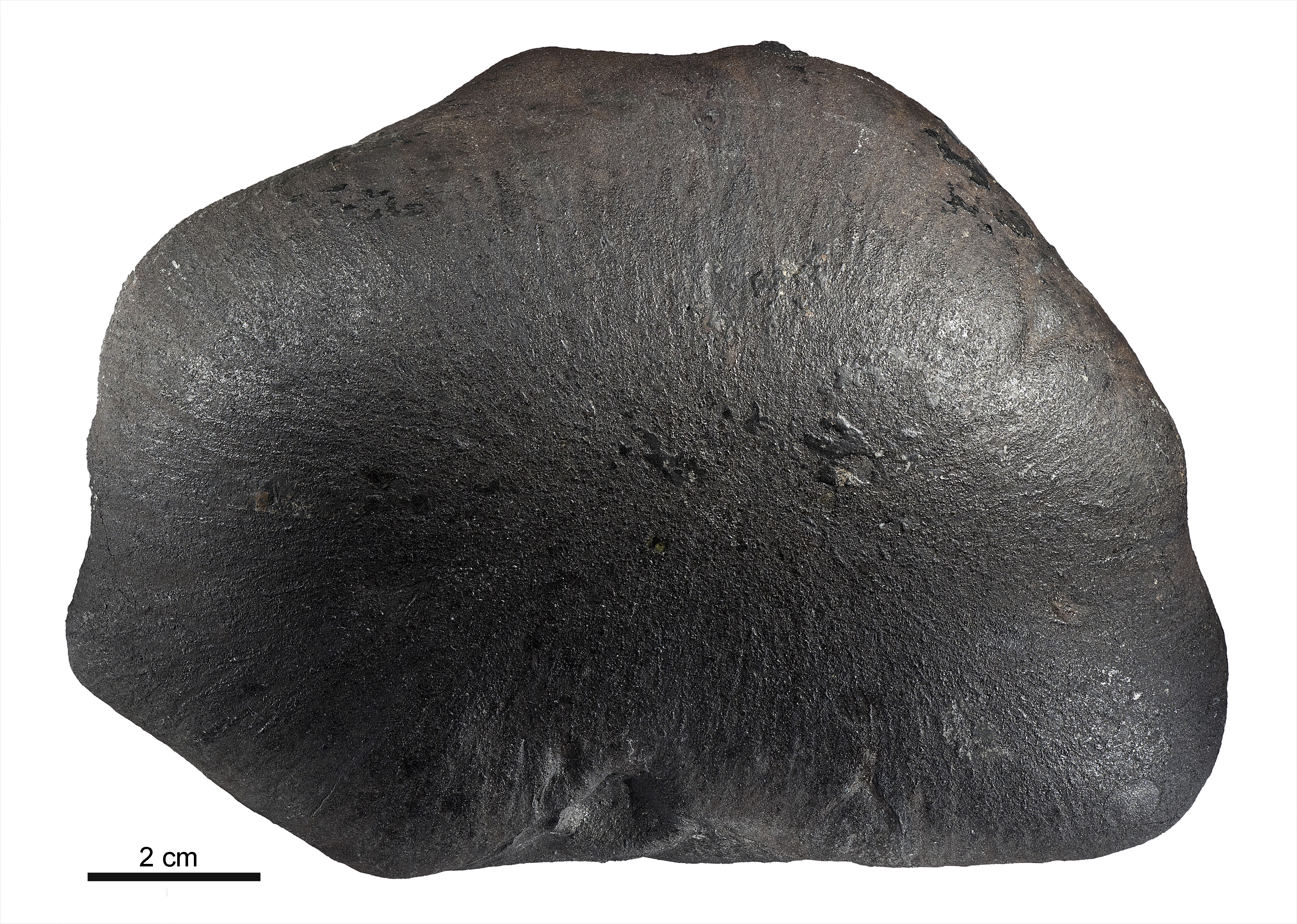
This meteorite crash-landed into a home in 2004.

The first time a meteorite was found in New Zealand was in c. 1862–1863, in the Wairarapa. Since then, ten other meteorites have been recovered as of August 2026. In 2004 the meteorite known as Auckland crash-landed into a home in Ellerslie, a suburb of the city of Auckland. The Protected Objects Act 1975 disallows the export of meteorites without permission from the Ministry for Culture and Heritage.

== List ==
Year recovered	Name	Location	Notes
1862 or 1863	Wairarapa	Wairarapa	This meteorite was originally given to or held by the Colonial Museum in Wellington. In 1928 an individual donated two meteorite rocks to the Auckland War Memorial Museum, and they became lost until 1955. When they were found again, it was not known if these rocks were from the Wairarapa meteorite, but a study comparing them to a sample in Wellington confirmed that they were from the Wairarapa meteorite.
1879	Makarewa	Southland	
1908	Mokoia	Taranaki	Landed during the day on 26 November. This was the first time a meteorite fall was observed in New Zealand, and was the last until 2004. A sonic boom was heard. Two pieces were found in Mokoia, in a small crater, and were given to the Whanganui museum.
1925	Morven	Canterbury	Found by William Stewart when ploughing his farm in Morven, about 160 kilometres (100 mi) from Dunedin. The meteorite is stored in the Tūhura Otago Museum.
1953	View Hill	Canterbury	
1970	Waingaromia	Gisborne	
1976	Dunganville	West Coast	Weighing 50 kilograms (110 lb), it is New Zealand's heavest known meteorite. It was found in a stream by a prospector.
1976	Kimbolton	Manawatū-Whanganui	
2004	Auckland	Auckland	It crash-landed into a home in the Auckland suburb of Ellerslie. It was bought by the Auckland War Memorial Museum.
2024	Takapō	Canterbury	A group of enthusiasts known as Fireballs Aotearoa found it after observing the fireball and calculating the approximate location of the meteorite. It is on display at the Tūhura Otago Museum.
2026		Wairarapa	Fireball was observed and the approximate location was calculated. After searching for four days in farmland, four fragments were recovered.

== See also ==
- List of largest meteorites on Earth
- List of solar eclipses visible from New Zealand
