= List of solar eclipses visible from Australia =

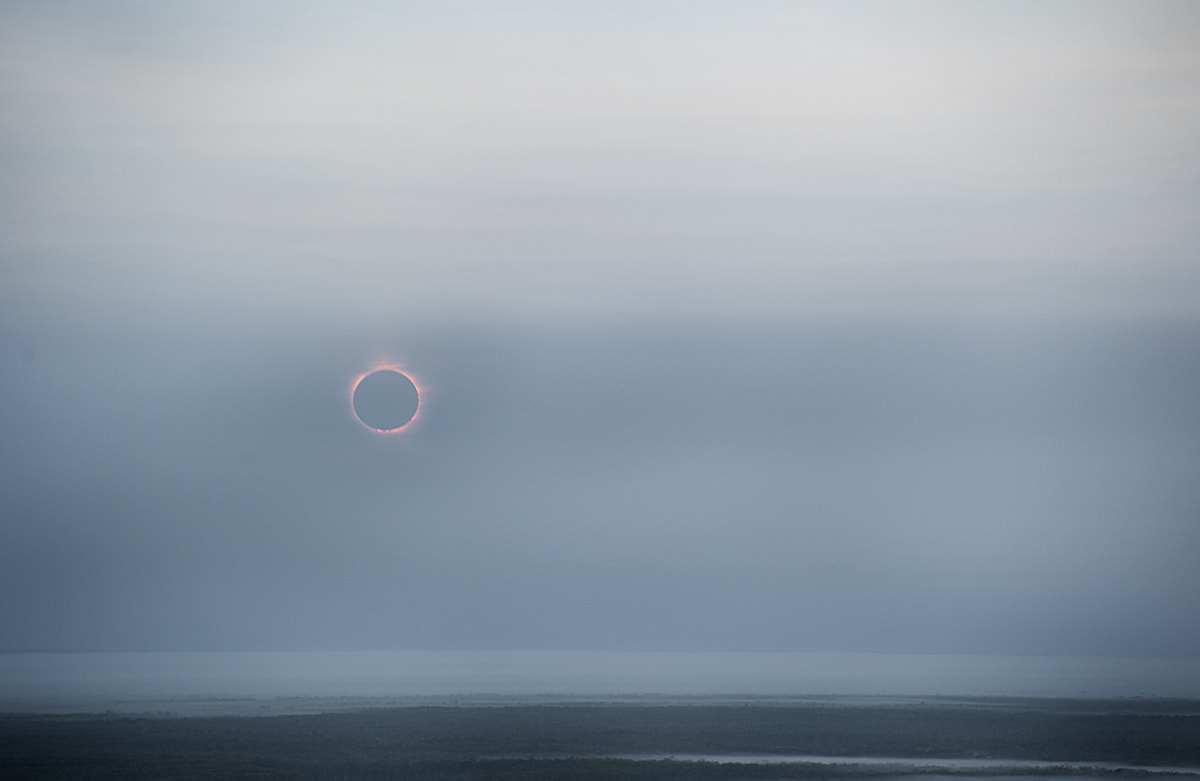
Totality during the Solar eclipse of November 2012, viewed from the East Arnhem Region, Northern Territory

Solar eclipses visible from Australia are relatively common. A solar eclipse occurs when the Moon passes between Earth and the Sun, thereby totally or partially obscuring Earth's view of the Sun. The shadows of solar eclipses often cross the Australian continent due to its large area of over 7.6 million square kilometers. However a view of totality from the continent is rare, with totality occurring over the Australian continent only five times during the 20th century, although it will occur more frequently, eleven times, during the 21st century.

== Succession ==
Table of previous and next eclipses visible from all states and the Northern Territory; dates sourced from Time and Date AS.

State/Territory	Total		Annular		Partial	
State/Territory	← Prev	Next →	← Prev	Next →	← Prev	Next →
New South Wales	4 December 2002	22 July 2028	14 January 1945	14 October 2042	21 September 2025	27 February 2036
Northern Territory	13 November 2012	22 July 2028	10 May 2013	14 October 2042	20 April 2023	22 July 2028
Queensland	13 November 2012	22 July 2028	10 May 2013	14 October 2042	20 April 2023	22 July 2028
South Australia	4 December 2002	22 July 2028	13 December 1936	14 October 2042	20 April 2023	22 July 2028
Tasmania	9 May 1910	25 June 2131	4 February 1981	9 March 2035	21 September 2025	27 February 2036
Victoria	23 October 1976	26 December 2038	14 January 1945	10 April 2089	21 September 2025	27 February 2036
Western Australia	20 April 2023	22 July 2028	10 May 2013	27 October 2106	20 April 2023	22 July 2028

== Total and annular eclipses ==
=== Total eclipses ===
Total solar eclipses visible on the Australian continent, 1800–2095.

4 March 1802	16 August 1822	7 August 1831	9 November 1836	15 April 1847
5 April 1856	25 March 1857	12 December 1871	9 May 1910	28 April 1911
21 September 1922	20 June 1974	23 October 1976	4 December 2002	13 November 2012
20 April 2023	22 July 2028	25 November 2030	13 July 2037	26 December 2038
31 May 2068	22 May 2077	27 January 2093		

=== Annular eclipses ===
Annular solar eclipses visible on the Australian continent, 1800–2100.

10 December 1806	6 June 1807	20 October 1846	1 February 1851	11 January 1861
18 June 1871	2 February 1878	22 November 1900	6 March 1905	14 February 1915
30 July 1916	7 March 1932	21 August 1933	13 December 1936	14 January 1945
8 April 1959	4 February 1981	16 February 1999	10 May 2013	9 March 2035
14 October 2042	22 September 2052	10 April 2089	15 November 2096	10 March 2100

== Partial eclipses ==
Solar eclipses visible partially on the Australian continent, 1800–2100.

=== 1801–1850 ===
21 February 1803	21 December 1805	9 October 1809	4 April 1810	13 March 1812
17 July 1814	27 May 1816	16 May 1817	9 November 1817	4 March 1821
1 January 1824	9 October 1828	3 April 1829	1 February 1832	20 January 1833
27 August 1840	16 August 1841	8 July 1842	16 June 1844	30 October 1845
18 August 1849	12 February 1850			

=== 1851–1900 ===
21 January 1852	20 July 1855	9 November 1855	8 July 1862	27 June 1864
11 November 1863	6 May 1869	15 April 1872	18 August 1868	28 June 1876
6 April 1875	17 September 1879	11 January 1880	10 November 1882	6 May 1883
8 September 1885	5 March 1886	22 February 1887	12 December 1890	29 September 1896
18 September 1899	1 February 1900			

=== 1901–1950 ===
18 May 1901	11 November 1901	7 May 1902	21 September 1903	17 March 1904
23 February 1906	3 January 1908	12 December 1909	22 October 1911	14 December 1917
18 May 1920	20 July 1925	14 January 1926	9 July 1926	3 January 1927
9 May 1929	21 October 1930	14 February 1934	2 December 1937	12 October 1939
21 September 1941	1 August 1943	20 July 1944	1 November 1948	21 October 1949

=== 1951–2000 ===
25 December 1954	20 June 1955	12 October 1958	27 March 1960	5 February 1962
14 January 1964	10 June 1964	23 November 1965	18 March 1969	31 August 1970
20 August 1971	11 June 1983	22 November 1984	9 April 1986	23 September 1987
18 March 1988	11 September 1988	15 January 1991	4 January 1992	13 November 1993
24 October 1995	2 September 1997	22 August 1998		

=== 2001–2049 ===
10 June 2002	23 November 2003	7 February 2008	26 January 2009	22 July 2009
25 November 2011	29 April 2014	9 March 2016	1 September 2016	13 July 2018
26 December 2019	21 June 2020	4 December 2021	21 September 2025	21 May 2031
27 February 2036	11 May 2040	25 October 2041	20 April 2042	3 October 2043
16 February 2045	5 February 2046	22 July 2047	25 November 2049	

=== 2051–2100 ===
4 October 2051	20 March 2053	16 January 2056	5 January 2057	5 November 2059
24 October 2060	11 March 2062	28 February 2063	27 December 2065	17 December 2066
4 October 2070	24 July 2074	6 January 2076	3 September 2081	24 August 2082
27 December 2084	22 June 2085	16 December 2085	31 March 2090	15 August 2091
27 November 2095	22 May 2096	4 November 2097	21 March 2099	4 September 2100

== Eclipses visible from capital cities ==
Total and annual eclipses visible in each capital city, 1800–2100.

=== Canberra ===
- Solar eclipse of October 14, 2042 (annular)

=== Melbourne ===
- Solar eclipse of July 30, 1916 (annular)
- Solar eclipse of October 23, 1976 (total)
- Solar eclipse of November 25, 2055 (total)

=== Brisbane ===
- Solar eclipse of August 7, 1901 (total)
- Solar eclipse of July 13, 2037 (total)
- Solar eclipse of January 27, 2093 (total)

=== Sydney ===
- Solar eclipse of July 22, 2028 (total)
- Solar eclipse of April 10, 2102 (annular)

=== Adelaide ===
- Solar eclipse of March 4, 1802 (total)
- Solar eclipse of July 30, 1916 (annular)

=== Perth ===
- Solar eclipse of April 8, 1959 (annular)
- Solar eclipse of May 31, 2068 (total)

=== Hobart ===
- Solar eclipse of May 9, 1910 (total)
- Solar eclipse of July 30, 1916 (annular)
- Solar eclipse of February 4, 1981 (annular)

== See also ==
- Lists of lunar eclipses
