= Sylacauga (meteorite) =

Meteorite that fell in 1954 in Alabama

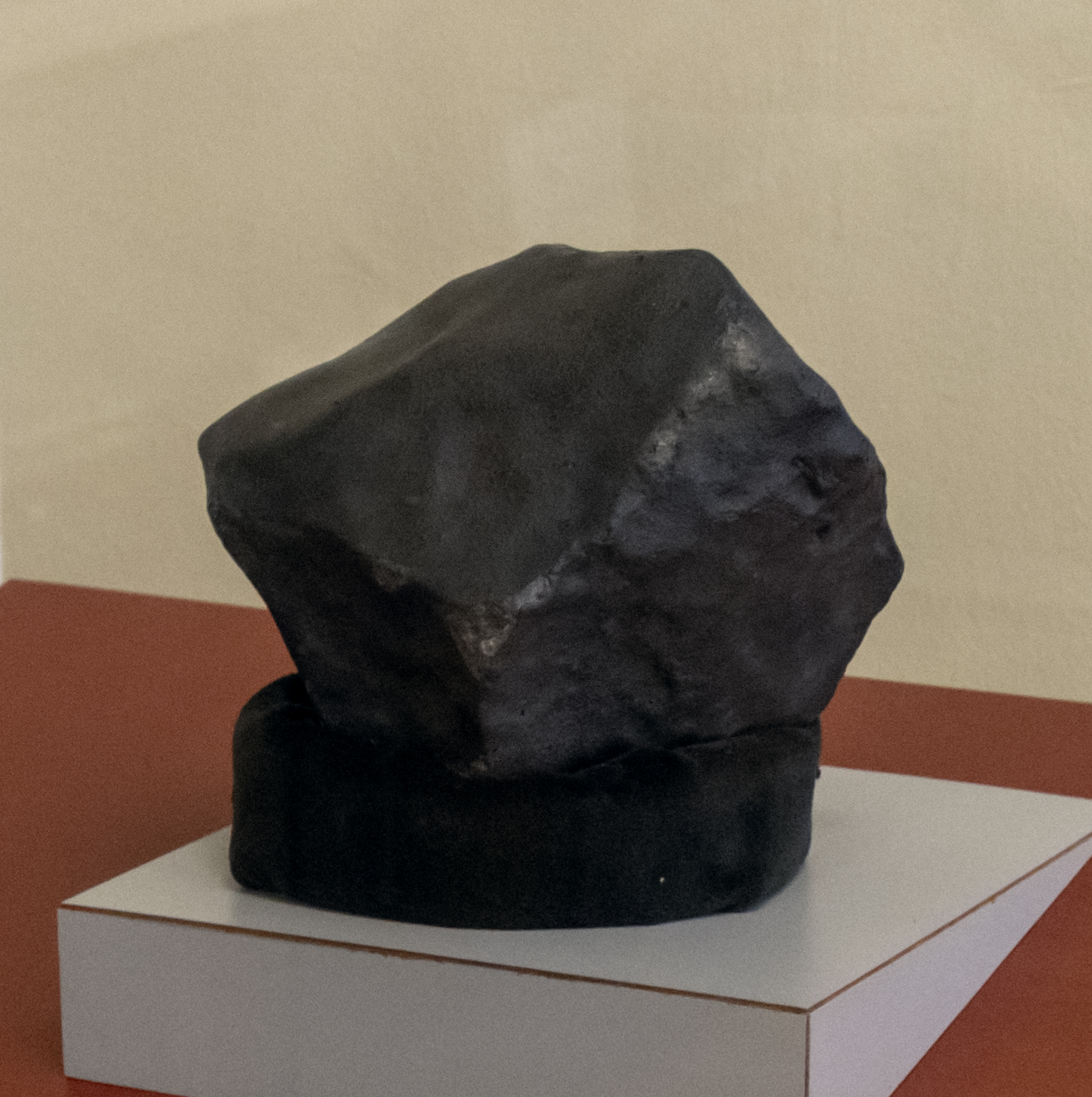
- The Hodges fragment of the meteorite at the Alabama Museum of Natural History in Tuscaloosa, Alabama.
- Type: Chondrite
- Class: Ordinary chondrite
- Group: H4
- Country: United States
- Region: Alabama
- Coordinates: 33°11′18.1″N 86°17′40.2″W
- Observed fall: Yes
- Fall date: 18:46 UT on November 30, 1954
- TKW: 5.54 kg
- Strewn field: Yes
- Related media on Wikimedia Commons

The Sylacauga meteorite fell on November 30, 1954, at 12:46 p.m. local time (18:46 UT) in Oak Grove, Alabama, near Sylacauga, in the United States. It is also commonly called the Hodges meteorite because a fragment of it struck Ann Elizabeth Fowler Hodges (1920–1972).

== Incident ==
=== Fireball ===
The meteor made a fireball visible from three American states as it streaked through the atmosphere, even though it fell early in the afternoon. There were also indications of an air blast, as witnesses described hearing "explosions or loud booms".

=== Impact ===
At 12:46 PM (CST) on Tuesday November 30, 1954, a meteorite fell through the skies above Sylacauga, Alabama. It split into at least three fragments, with one of the fragments falling through a roof and then landing on Hodges, who was napping on her couch. She recalled the meteorite came through her roof around 2:00 PM local time, although the official time the meteorite fell was 12:46 PM. The meteorite left a 3-foot (91 cm) wide hole in the roof of her house, bounced off a console radio, and hit her on her upper thigh and hand, giving her a large bruise.

Hodges and her mother, who were in the house at the time, thought the chimney had collapsed as there was a lot of dust and debris. Once they noticed the large rock, they called both the police and fire department. Hodges' husband, Eugene Hodges, came home later that evening at about 6:00 pm local time, unaware of what had happened to his wife. She told him there was a "little excitement." That night she did not sleep well and ended up going to the hospital the next day due to being distressed by the incident, rather than for her physical injury, which was said to be only the large bruise on her upper thigh.

== Following events ==
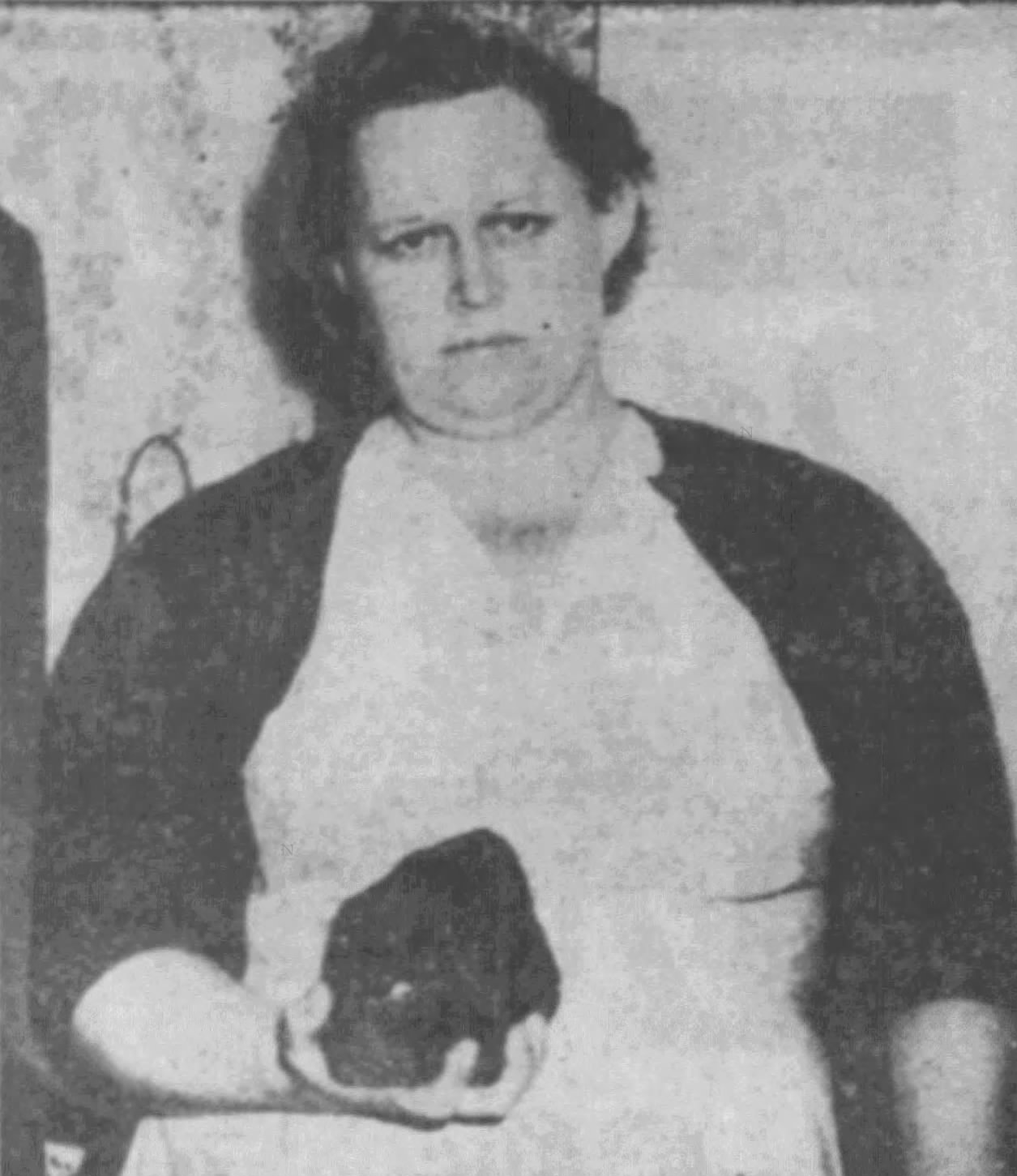
Ann Hodges holding the meteorite

Members from the Maxwell Air Force Base went to the Hodges home to look at and confiscate the meteorite. They confirmed its identity as a chondrite meteorite.

The meteorite was confiscated by the Sylacauga police chief, who then turned it over to the United States Air Force. The Mayor of Sylacauga, Ed J. Howard, originally intended to give it to the Alabama Museum of Natural History (AMNH) of the University of Alabama. Hodges stated that she had "enough evidence that the thing fell in my house" and the meteorite was eventually given back to the Hodges.

Both the Hodgeses and their landlord, Bertie Guy, claimed ownership of the rock, Guy's claim being that it had fallen on her property. The Hodgeses and Guy settled, with the Hodgeses paying $500 for the rock. However, by the time it was returned to the Hodgeses, over a year later, public attention had diminished, and they were unable to then find a buyer.

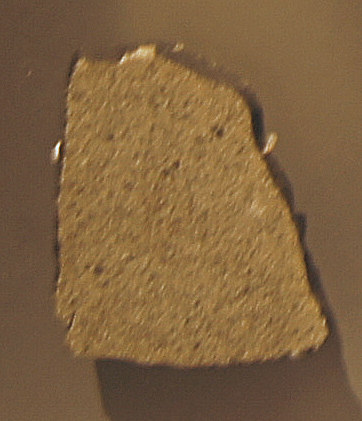
A slice of the meteorite, the National Museum of Natural History, the Smithsonian, DC

The day after the fall, local farmer Julius McKinney came upon the second-largest fragment from the same meteorite. An Indianapolis-based lawyer bought it for the Smithsonian Institution. The McKinney family was able to use the money to buy a car and a house.

== Other instances of people being hit by meteorites ==
The earliest claim of a person being hit by a meteorite comes from 1677 in a manuscript published at Tortona, Italy, which tells of a Milanese friar who was killed by one, although its veracity is unknown. The Tunguska event in 1908 is reported to have caused three casualties. In 1992, a small meteorite fragment (3g) hit a young Ugandan boy in Mbale; it had been slowed by a tree and caused no injury.

On the night of October 3, 2021, a meteorite fell through the roof of a house in Golden, British Columbia, landing on a sleeping woman's pillow, but without harming her.

== Fragments ==
Upon the entry into the atmosphere, the Sylacauga meteorite fragmented into at least three pieces:

1. The Hodges fragment (3.86 kilograms (8.5 lb)) – 33°11′18.1″N 86°17′40.2″W); struck Ann Elizabeth Hodges.
2. The McKinney fragment (1.68 kilograms (3.7 lb)) – 33°13′08.4″N 86°17′20.7″W); was found the next day December 1, 1954, by Julius Kempis McKinney.
3. A third fragment is believed to have struck the Earth somewhere near Childersburg (a few km northwest of Oak Grove).

== Classification ==
The Sylacauga meteorite is classified as an ordinary chondrite of H4 group.

== Orbit ==
The meteoroid came in on the sunward side of the Earth, so when it hit, it had passed the perihelion and was traveling outward from the Sun. Its orbit may have been similar to that of 1685 Toro.

== Ann Elizabeth Fowler Hodges ==
Ann Elizabeth Fowler Hodges
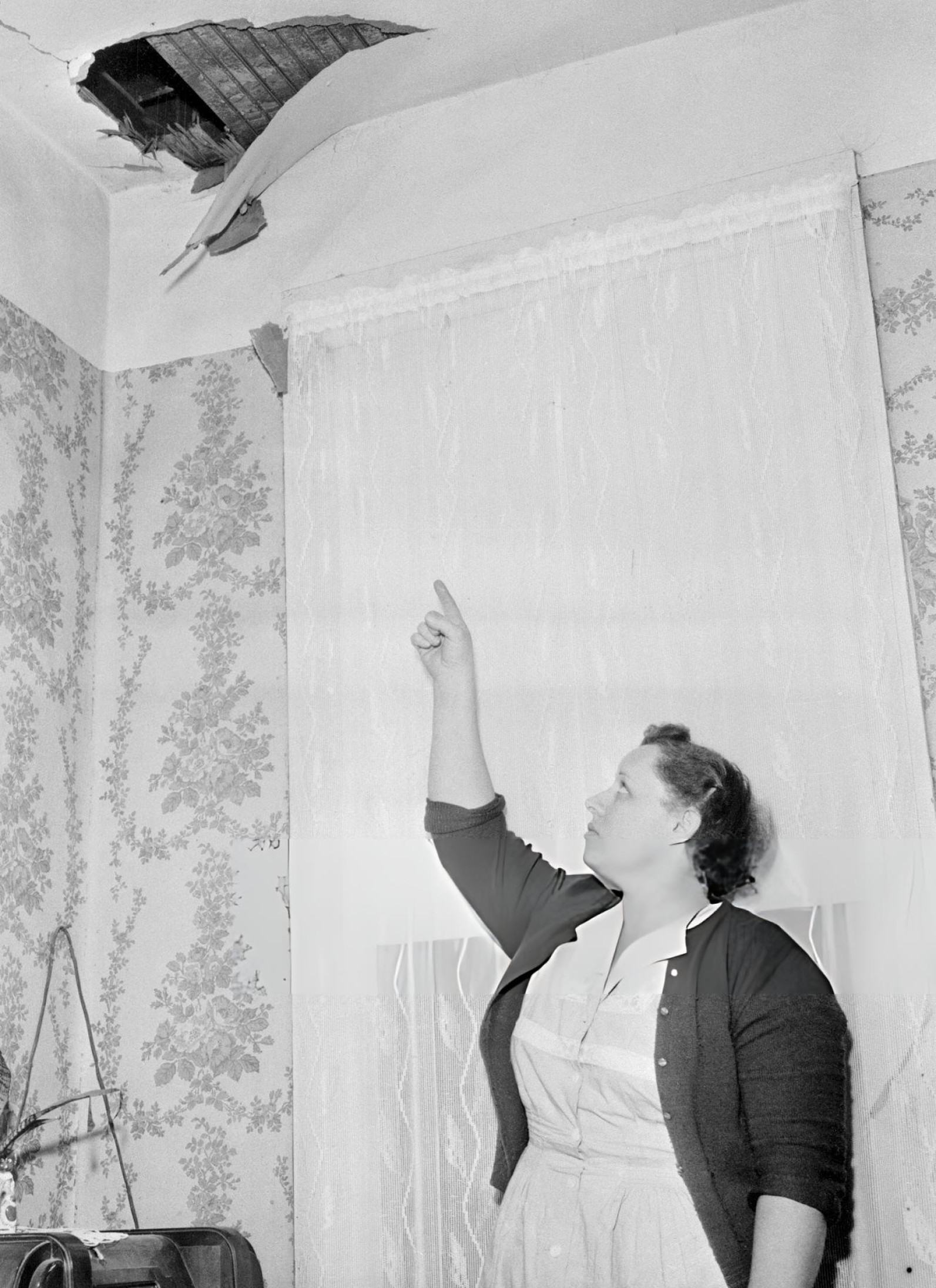
- Hodges in 1954, pointing at the hole in her house caused by the Sylacauga meteorite
- Born: Ann Elizabeth Fowler; February 2, 1920; Alabama, U.S.
- Died: September 10, 1972 (aged 52); Sylacauga, Alabama, U.S.
- Resting place: Charity Baptist Church Cemetery, Hazel Green, Alabama, U.S.
- Known for: Meteorite fall
- Spouse: Eugene Hodges (div. 1964)

Ann Elizabeth Fowler Hodges (also known as Mrs. Hodges, Mrs. Hewlett Hodges, and Mrs. Huelitt Hodges; February 2, 1920 – September 10, 1972) was an American woman known for being the first documented individual to be struck by a meteorite and survive. Following the incident, Ann's behavior changed. Ann Hodges was uncomfortable with the public attention and the stress of the dispute over ownership of the meteorite. The Hodgeses donated it to the Alabama Museum of Natural History in 1956. Her health problems worsened, her shyness became social anxiety, and she suffered from what appeared to be post-traumatic stress disorder.

Ann Hodges had immense, although short-term, attention for the incident. About 200 reporters were waiting to talk to her outside of her house, most of whom were unwelcome. Ann was invited to and attended the game show I’ve Got a Secret hosted by Garry Moore. Mrs. Hodges also received lots of fan mail and questions, although she did not reply to them. Mr. Hodges indicated they had received several offers for the meteorite while it was at the Air Force Base, but could not accept offers since it was not in their possession. One offer, he states, was close to $5,500. By the time the meteorite was returned to Ann following the legal battle with Mrs. Guy, they could not find a buyer, since the excitement of the event had dwindled. In 1956, Mrs. Hodges decided to sell the meteorite to the Alabama Museum of Natural History, against her husband's wishes, and as he recalled, for about $25.

Ann and Eugene Hodges were divorced in 1964; they had no children.

Hodges died in a nursing home from kidney failure on September 10, 1972.

== Legacy ==
The meteorite that flew through the sky that night was named the Sylacauga meteorite and the fragment that hit Hodges was aptly named the Hodges Fragment. Another fragment from the original meteorite was sold to the Smithsonian, while the Hodges Fragment remains on exhibit at the Alabama Museum of Natural History.

The radio that was hit by the meteorite was later loaned to the American Museum of Natural History in 2005 by Eugene Hodges, fifty years after the impact event.

In May 2017, a 10.3-gram ("dime-sized") piece of the McKinney fragment sold at auction for US$7,500 (equivalent to $10,000 in 2025), 18.5 times the value of its weight in gold at the time. At this valuation, the entire 3.86-kg Hodges fragment was worth $2.8 million ($3.7 million in 2025), though the Hodges fragment, as the central piece in the event, is likely worth more.

More than 50,000 meteorites have been found on Earth―with 27 recovered in Georgia―but the Hodges Fragment remains the only one that is known to have hit a person.

== See also ==
- Auckland (meteorite), which crashed through a house in New Zealand
- Glossary of meteoritics
