= Auckland (meteorite) =

2004 meteorite in New Zealand

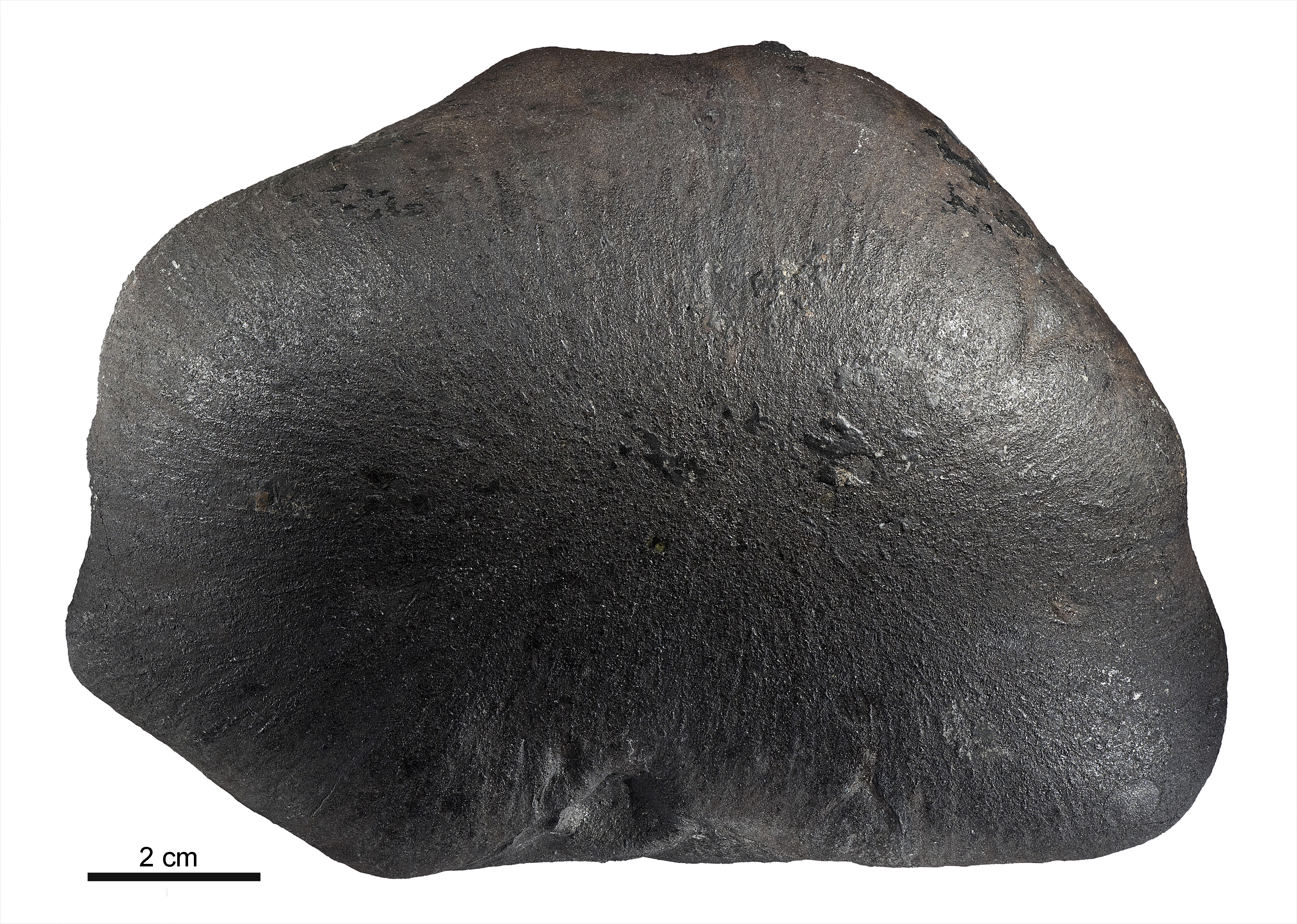
- Country: New Zealand
- Region: Auckland
- Coordinates: 36.8949°S 174.8076°E
- Observed fall: Yes
- Fall date: 12 June 2004
- Alternative names: Ellerslie

The Auckland meteorite, also known as the Ellerslie meteorite, landed in Ellerslie, a suburb of Auckland, New Zealand, on 12 June 2004. It crashed through the roof of a house and landed in the living room. As the ninth meteorite to ever be discovered in New Zealand, it is the only one to have ever hit a house in the country. It is owned by the Auckland War Memorial Museum.

== Impact ==
At 9:30 am on 12 June 2004, a meteorite crashed through the roof of a house in Ellerslie, a suburb in Auckland, New Zealand. After bouncing off a couch and hitting the ceiling, it came to a standstill in the living room, not long after the homeowners' grandson had been playing there. The crash was accompanied by a "huge" explosion, and caused dust to go throughout the room. Due to the landing occurring at daylight, nobody saw the meteorite fall to the ground—Brenda Archer (one of the homeowners) said that "If it had fallen in the garden, it would probably have been added to the pile of rocks I'm taking to the dump. Nobody would have known about it."

As the country's ninth meteorite to be recovered, it was the first since 1976—the tenth was found in 2024. It was also the country's second meteorite to have been discovered shortly after falling to the ground. This is the only meteorite to have ever hit a house in New Zealand.

== Subsequent events and sale ==
The landing appeared on the news throughout the world, and was followed by a "meteorite frenzy" in New Zealand. Many people were convinced that they were in possession of a meteorite, and took them to be assessed by scientists. No new meteorites were found.

The Archer family was flooded with purchase offers from around the world. This included an offer of US$15,000 (NZ$24,000) from the United States, and an offer of NZ$50,000 from South Korea. These were rejected, with difficulty; the Archers said, "We're both retired, so we don't need the money". They had no plan on keeping it and wanted to sell it within New Zealand to someone who would put it on public display. It was later bought by the Auckland War Memorial Museum for NZ$40,000 and it remains there.

Starting in July 2004 the meteorite spent two months at an exhibition in Auckland Museum. Te Papa held it for an exhibition from December 2004 to March 2005.

== Name ==
Despite a tradition of naming meteorites after the nearest post office, it was officially named the Auckland Meteorite, because an Australian meteorite had already been named Ellerslie. The name Tecoma—from the street in front of the house on which the meteorite fell—was considered, but an American meteorite has a homophonous name.

== Scientific analysis and description ==
Shortly after the landing, scientists wanted to split the meteorite to determine its composition, but this was cancelled within a few weeks as too much of the meteorite would have had to have been taken off. Since then, small fragments have been cut off by the Auckland Museum, and a cut was made through the base of the meteorite for a study that was published in 2023.

Auckland contains olivine, orthopyroxene and maskelynite, and is completely unweathered (W0). This suggests that it is a "strongly metamorphosed fragment from the interior of a low iron ordinary chondrite (L6) parent asteroid." It is also believed to have experienced extreme shock metamorphism (S5).

The meteorite is 4.56 billion years old. It has a weight of 1.3 kilograms (2.9 lb), and an oblate shape with dimensions of 13 cm × 10 cm × 6 cm (5.1 in × 3.9 in × 2.4 in). It has a "smooth asymmetric black-red fusion crust" with "flow lines and regmaglypts are visible on one surface". Inside, there are relict chondrules with diameters ranging up to 1 mm.

== See also ==
- List of meteorites found in New Zealand
- Sylacauga (meteorite), which crashed through a house in Alabama
