= Solar eclipse of November 13, 2012 =

Total eclipse

- Total eclipse
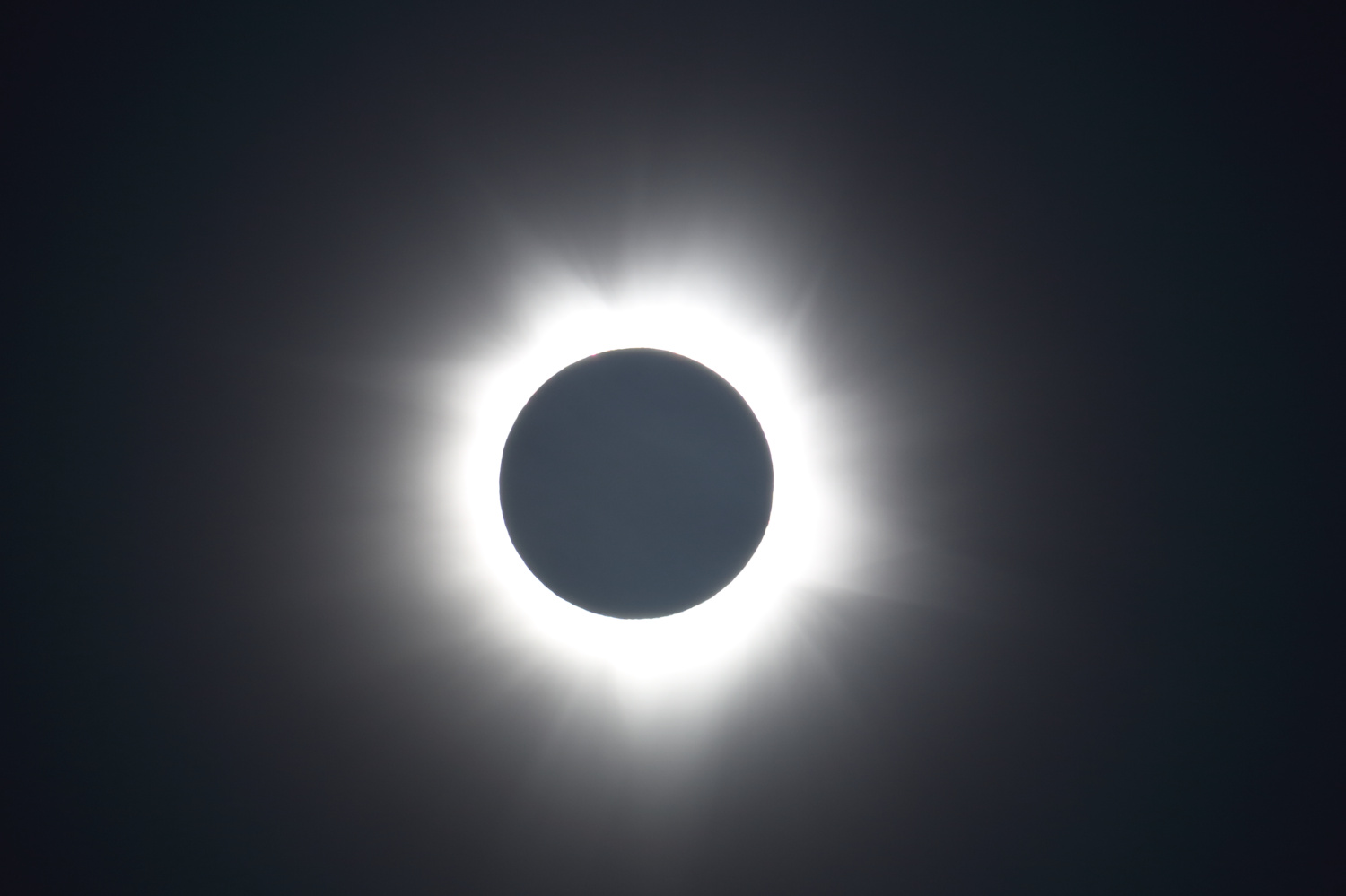
- Totality as seen from Mount Carbine, Queensland

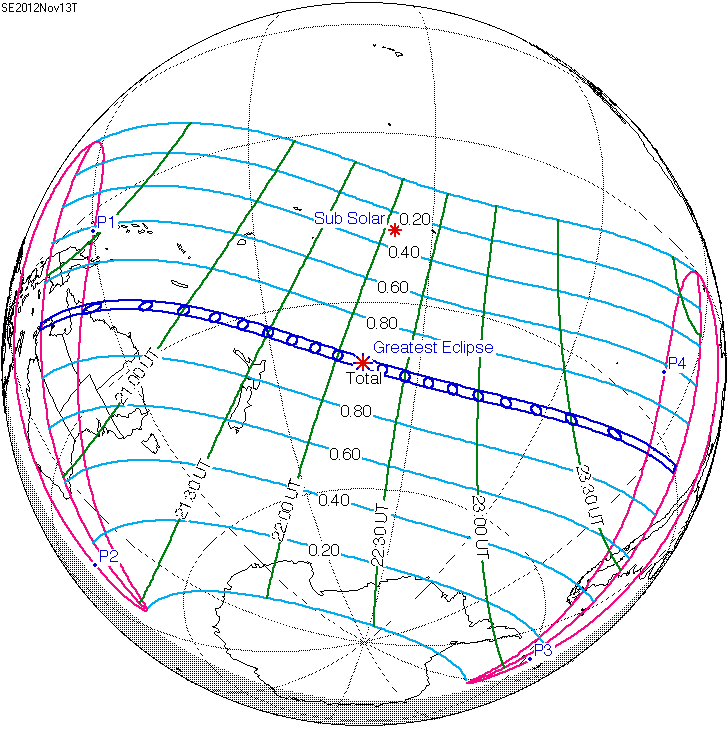
- Map
- Gamma: −0.3719
- Magnitude: 1.05

Maximum eclipse
- Duration: 242 s (4 min 2 s)
- Coordinates: 40°S 161.3°W
- Max. width of band: 179 km (111 mi)

Times (UTC)
- (P1) Partial begin: 19:37:58
- (U1) Total begin: 20:35:08
- Greatest eclipse: 22:12:55
- (U4) Total end: 23:48:24
- (P4) Partial end: 0:45:34

References
- Saros: 133 (45 of 72)
- Catalog # (SE5000): 9536

A total solar eclipse occurred at the Moon's ascending node of orbit between Tuesday, November 13 and Wednesday, November 14, 2012, with a magnitude of 1.05. A solar eclipse occurs when the Moon passes between Earth and the Sun, thereby totally or partly obscuring the image of the Sun for a viewer on Earth. A total solar eclipse occurs when the Moon's apparent diameter is larger than the Sun's, blocking all direct sunlight, turning day into darkness. Totality occurs in a narrow path across Earth's surface, with the partial solar eclipse visible over a surrounding region thousands of kilometres wide. Occurring about 12 hours before perigee (on November 14, 2012, at 10:20 UTC), the Moon's apparent diameter was larger.

Because it crossed the International Date Line it began in local time on November 14 west of the date line over northern Australia, and ended in local time on November 13 east of the date line near the west coast of South America. Totality was visible from parts of Northern Australia. A partial eclipse was visible for parts of Australia, New Zealand, Oceania, West Antarctica, the Antarctic Peninsula, and southern South America.

== Visibility ==

For this eclipse, totality was visible from northern Australia to about 470 km north of the Chilean Juan Fernández Islands in the southern Pacific Ocean where totality ended. The most populous city to experience totality was Cairns, which had around 2 minutes of totality an hour after daybreak (06:39 AEST, 20:39 UTC) with the Sun at an altitude of 14°. Norfolk Island, a small Pacific island east of Australia, experienced a partial eclipse with a maximum eclipse of 98% of the Sun obscured at 08:37 NFT and an altitude of 42°.

New Zealand experienced a partial eclipse. Auckland had 84.8% of the Sun obscured, whereas Wellington, Christchurch and Dunedin respectively had 71.2%, 61.9% and 52.9% of the Sun obscured. Maximum eclipse over New Zealand occurred around 10:30 NZDT (21:30 UTC), with Auckland at 10:27, Wellington at 10:34, Christchurch at 10:35 and Dunedin at 10:36.

Most of Chile and parts of Argentina saw a partial eclipse at sunset. In some places over half the Sun was obscured. In Chile, Talcahuano in Biobío saw 72% obscured, Castro in Los Lagos saw 56% obscured. Chilean coastal locations were ideally situated to observe an eclipsing sunset over the Pacific Ocean. Points further north, up to about Chañaral, saw the eclipse begin as the Sun was setting.

West of the International Date Line the eclipse took place on the morning of November 14. The maximum eclipse totality, of duration 4 min 2 sec, occurred east of the International Date Line on November 13, approximately 2,000 km east of New Zealand, and 9,600 km west of Chile.

On the morning of November 14, skies in Auckland were cloudy, obscuring much of the eclipse, which peaked at 10:27 NZDT. Cloud also obscured the moment of totality at Cairns, disappointing many tourists that had flocked to the area. Eclipse chasers along the northern beaches up through to Port Douglas generally got a clear view.

== Eclipse timing ==
=== Places experiencing total eclipse ===
Solar Eclipse of November 13, 2012 (Local Times)
Country or territory	City or place	Start of partial eclipse	Start of total eclipse	Maximum eclipse	End of total eclipse	End of partial eclipse	Duration of totality (min:s)	Duration of eclipse (hr:min)	Maximum magnitude
Australia	Cairns (Note: The times listed for this location occur on November 14, 2012, local time.)	05:44:45	06:38:35	06:39:35	06:40:36	07:40:25	2:01	1:56	1.0136
Australia	Gordonvale	05:44:55	06:38:53	06:39:46	06:40:40	07:40:37	1:47	1:56	1.0093

=== Places experiencing partial eclipse ===
Solar Eclipse of November 13, 2012 (Local Times)
Country or territory	City or place	Start of partial eclipse	Maximum eclipse	End of partial eclipse	Duration of eclipse (hr:min)	Maximum coverage
Indonesia	Jayapura	05:14:42 (sunrise)	05:28:11	06:21:40	1:07	60.25%
Papua New Guinea	Port Moresby	05:39:30 (sunrise)	06:32:45	07:31:59	1:52	76.38%
Nauru	Yaren	07:47:50	08:32:57	09:22:36	1:35	18.93%
Solomon Islands	Honiara	06:40:12	07:36:22	08:39:27	1:59	57.13%
Australia	Darwin	06:10:43 (sunrise)	06:13:04	07:01:06	0:50	87.62%
Indonesia	Manokwari	05:43:29 (sunrise)	05:45:47	06:20:05	0:37	45.76%
Vanuatu	Port Vila	06:48:22	07:51:56	09:04:13	2:16	71.43%
Tuvalu	Funafuti	07:58:47	08:53:34	09:54:57	1:56	23.52%
Australia	Brisbane	05:56:22	06:54:26	07:58:57	2:03	80.08%
New Caledonia	Nouméa	06:51:40	07:56:16	09:09:31	2:18	89.95%
Australia	Adelaide	06:42:54	07:30:51	08:22:31	1:40	42.06%
Australia	Sydney	07:07:12	08:02:45	09:03:42	1:57	59.50%
Australia	Canberra	07:10:11	08:03:58	09:02:41	1:53	53.21%
Fiji	Suva	08:57:47	10:04:49	11:21:03	2:23	55.03%
Timor-Leste	Baucau	06:03:47 (sunrise)	06:06:06	06:28:00	0:24	30.42%
Australia	Melbourne	07:16:08	08:06:19	09:00:32	1:44	42.34%
Wallis and Futuna	Mata Utu	08:05:18	09:07:11	10:16:51	2:12	30.35%
Norfolk Island	Kingston	07:31:17	08:37:36	09:52:12	2:21	98.35%
Australia	Perth	05:09:17 (sunrise)	05:16:12	05:41:40	0:32	21.83%
Samoa	Apia	10:14:35	11:16:40	12:25:54	2:11	25.24%
Tonga	Nuku'alofa	09:08:33	10:19:59	11:40:25	2:32	54.27%
New Zealand	Auckland	09:18:10	10:27:31	11:44:01	2:26	84.90%
Niue	Alofi	09:17:43	10:28:04	11:46:14	2:29	38.78%
Cook Islands	Rarotonga	10:43:27	11:57:38	13:15:44	2:32	32.56%
Falkland Islands	Stanley	19:41:08	20:16:49	20:20:53 (sunset)	0:40	23.04%
Chile	Santiago	19:50:15	20:18:53	20:21:40 (sunset)	0:31	43.09%
Argentina	Neuquén	19:46:53	20:19:51	20:23:14 (sunset)	0:36	45.47%
Pitcairn Islands	Adamstown	14:08:43	15:20:53	16:25:14	2:17	37.99%
Argentina	Bariloche	19:45:29	20:34:50	20:41:33 (sunset)	0:56	57.47%
Chile	Easter Island	17:40:13	18:45:09	19:43:05	2:03	61.62%

== Gallery ==
Video of total eclipse in Far North Queensland

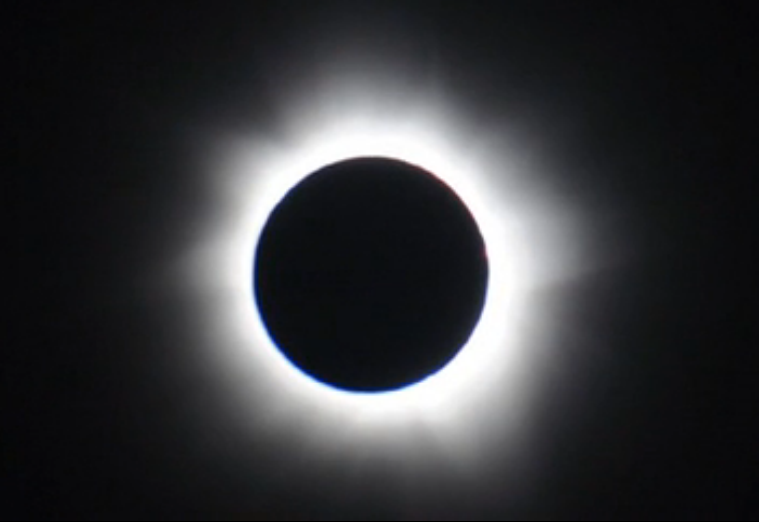
Screenshot of NASA video viewed from northern Australia

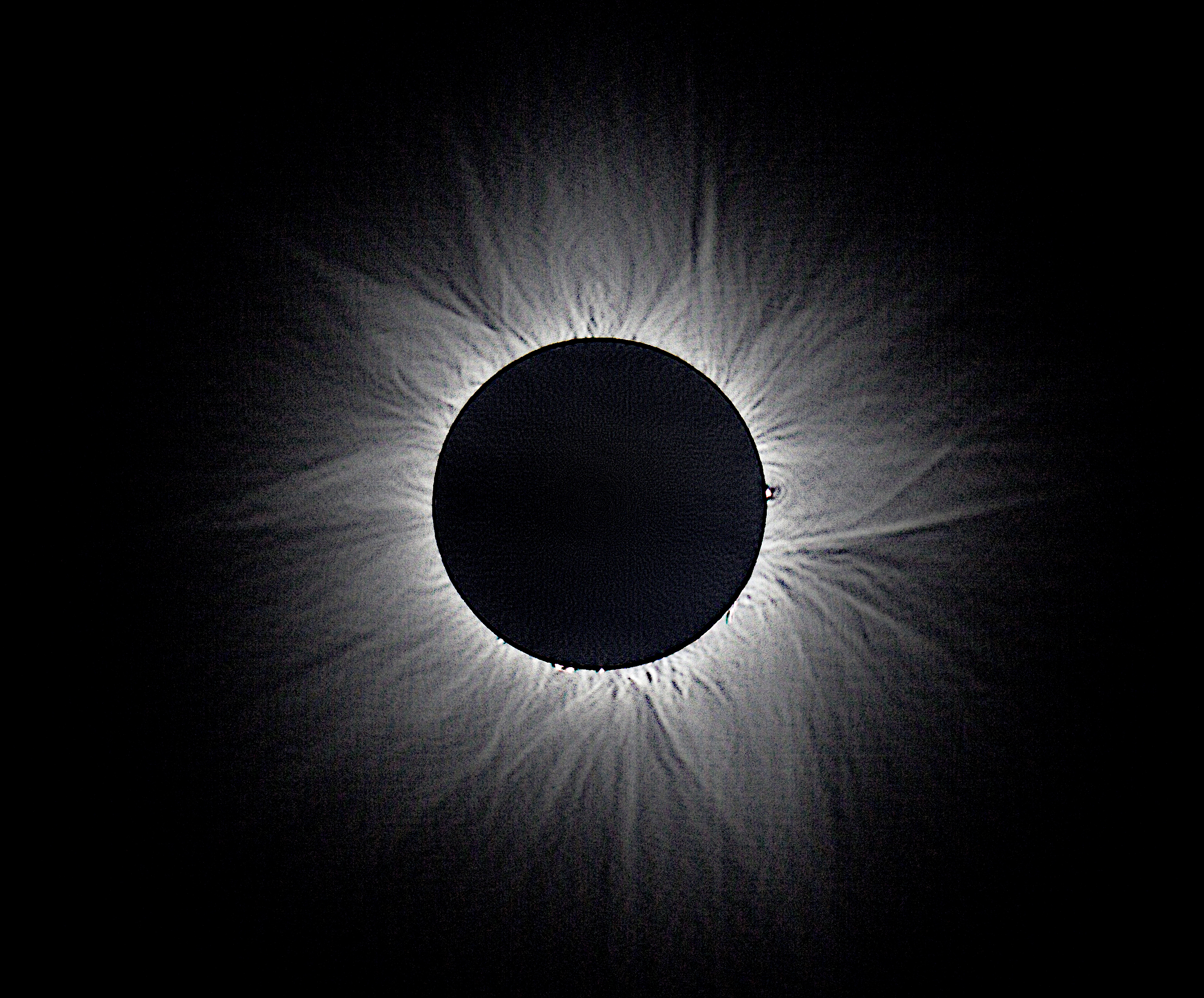
Totality from Mount Carbine, Queensland, 20:33 UTC

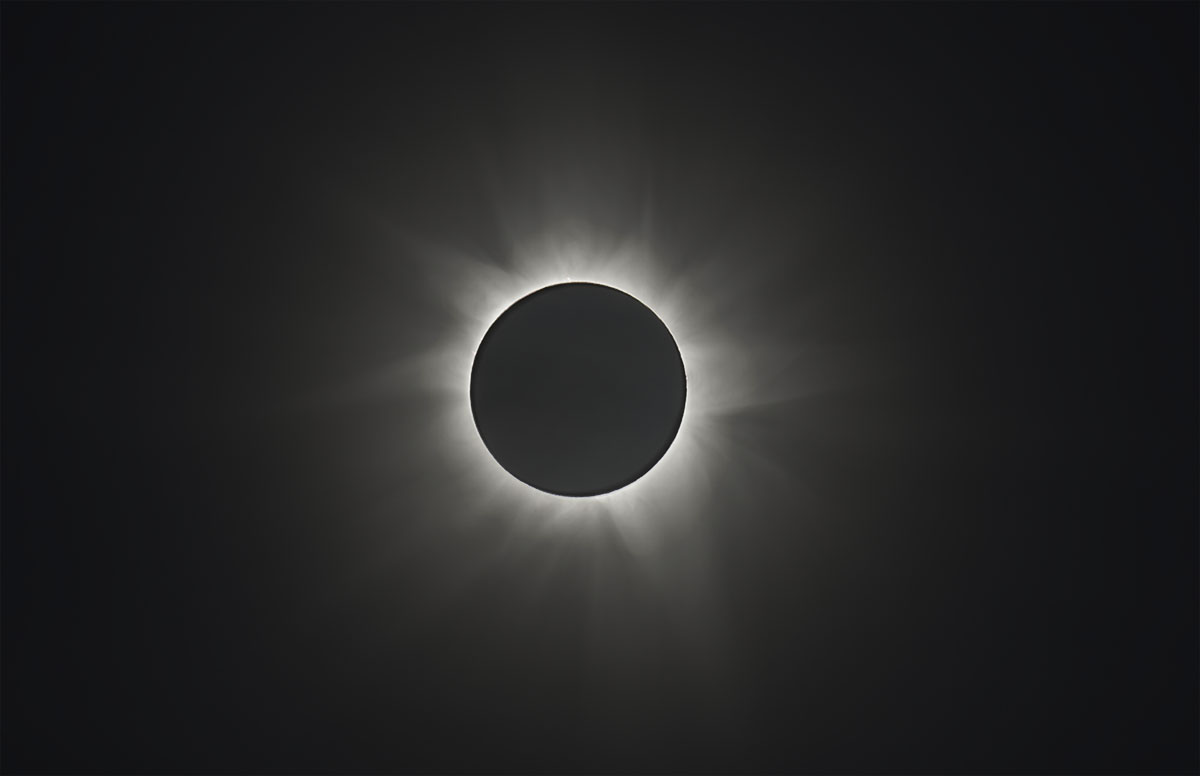
Totality from Mount Mulligan, Queensland, 20:39 UTC

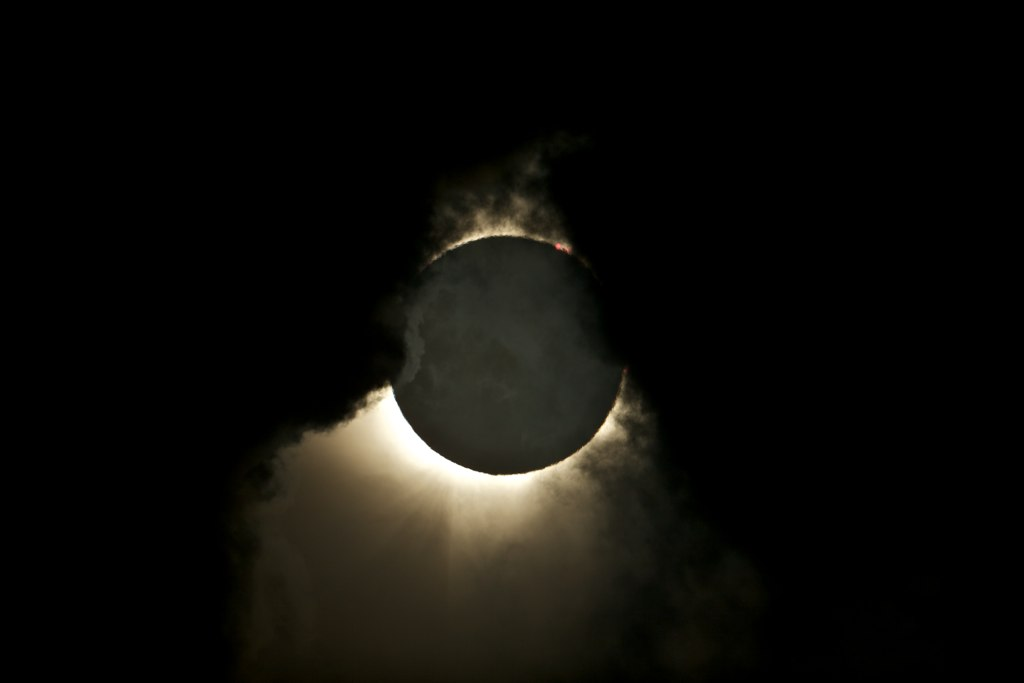
Totality from Port Douglas, Queensland, 20:40 UTC

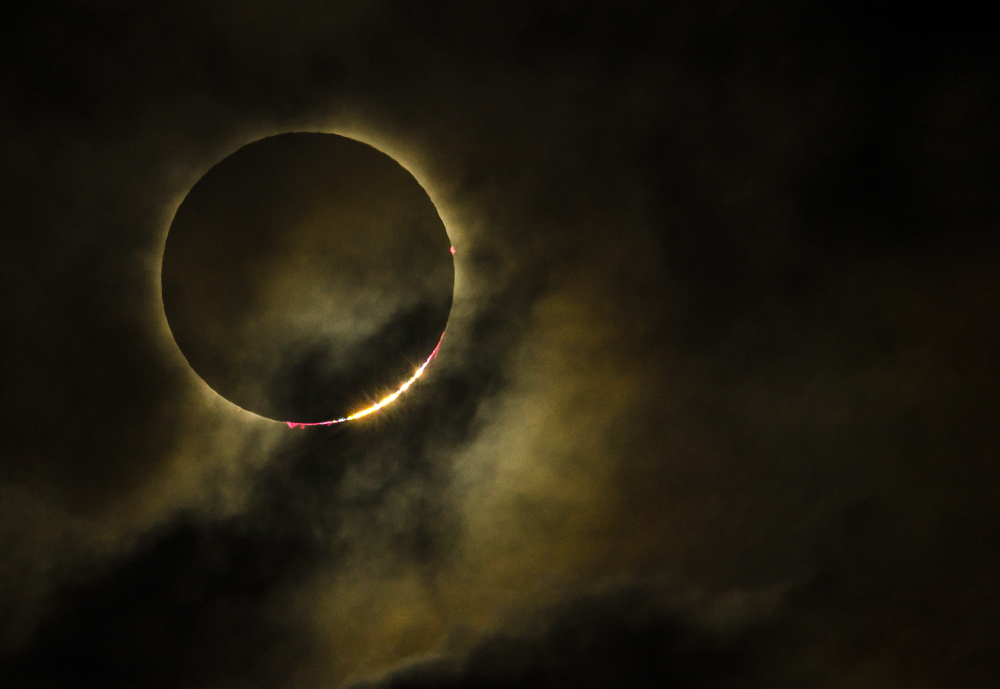
Totality with Baily's beads in Mossman Gorge, Queensland, 20:40 UTC

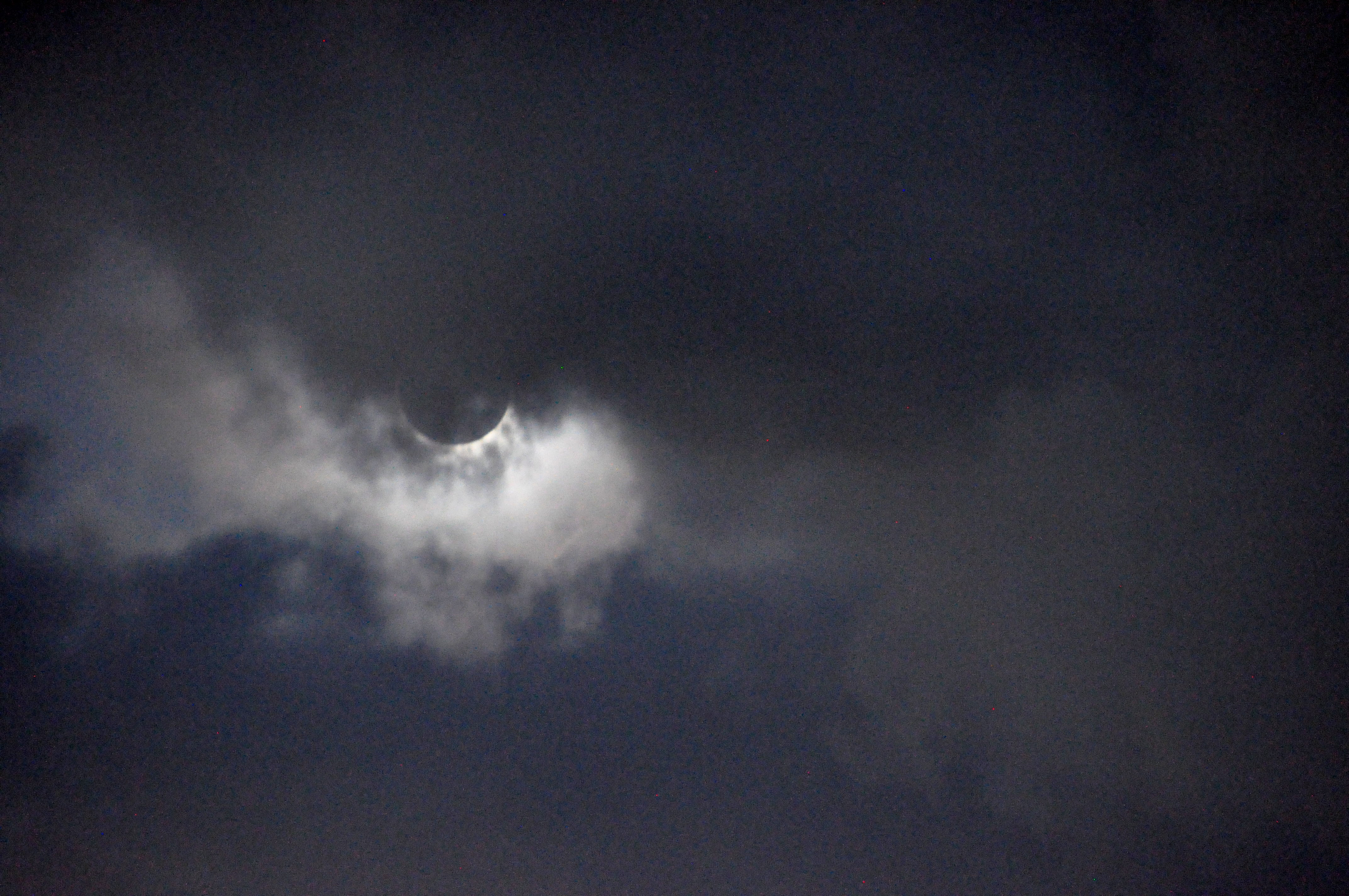
Totality from Trinity Beach, Queensland, 20:41 UTC

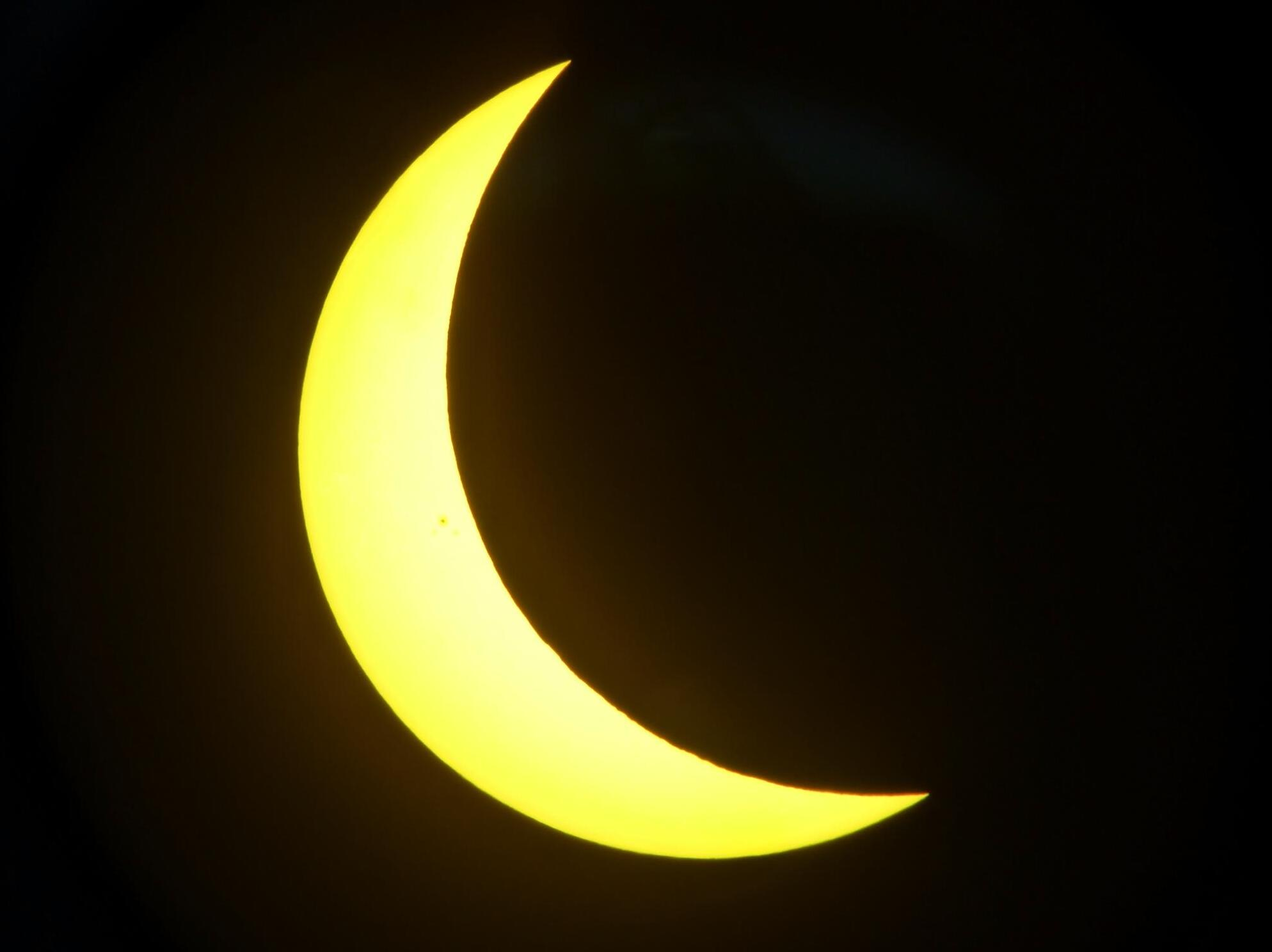
Partial from Redcliffe, Queensland, 20:46 UTC

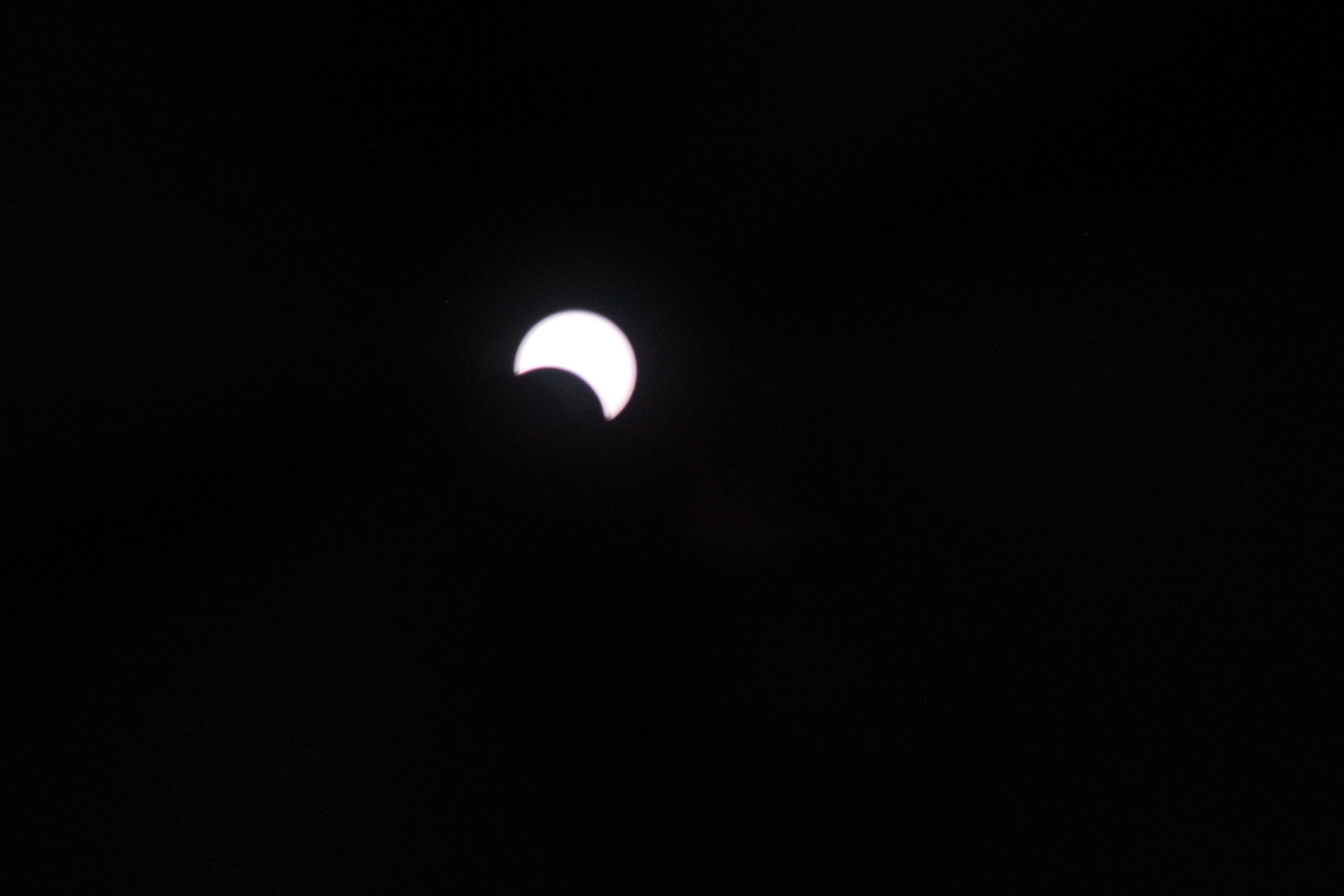
Partial from Adelaide, Australia, 20:47 UTC

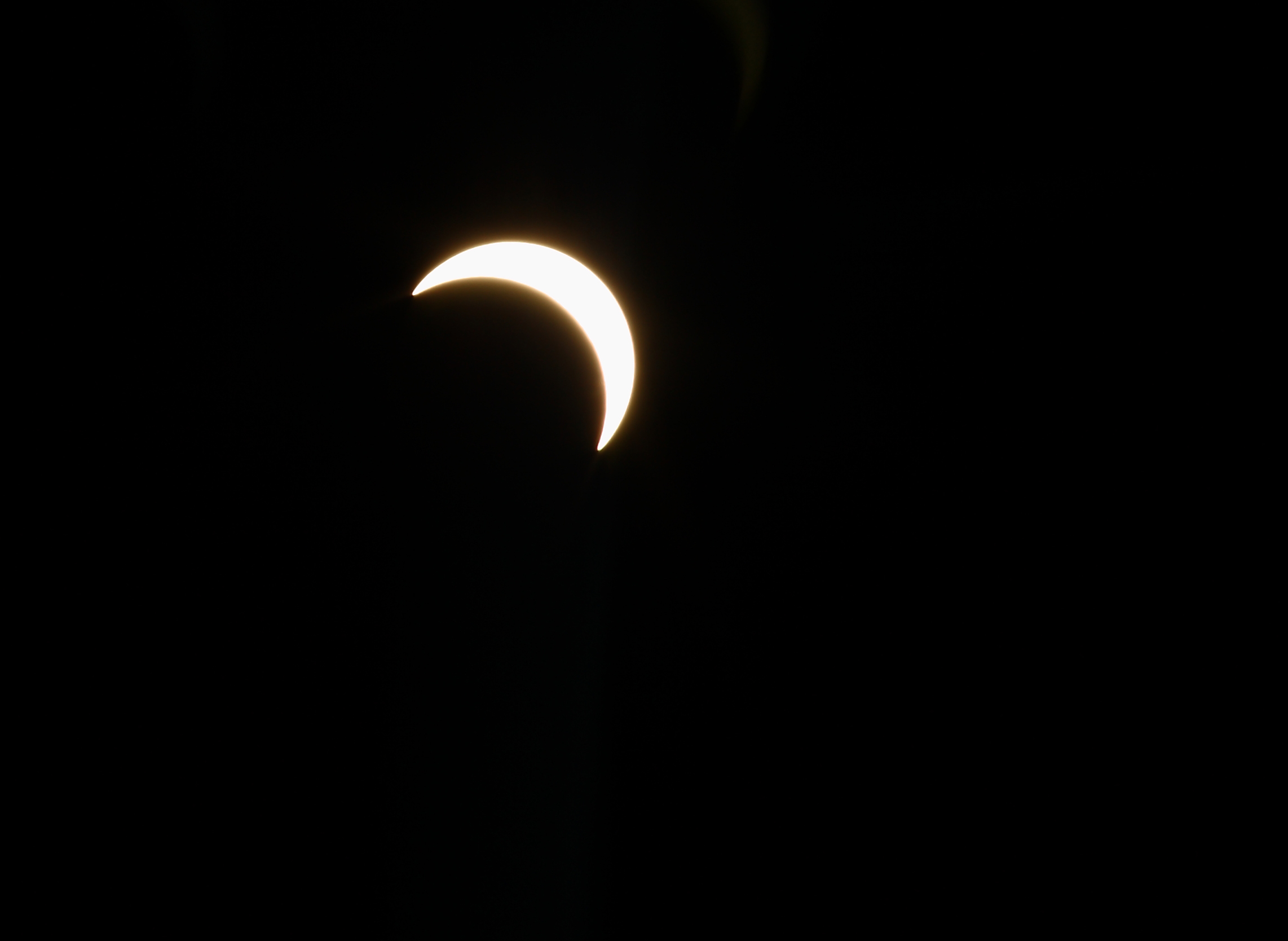
Partial from Brisbane, Australia, 21:07 UTC

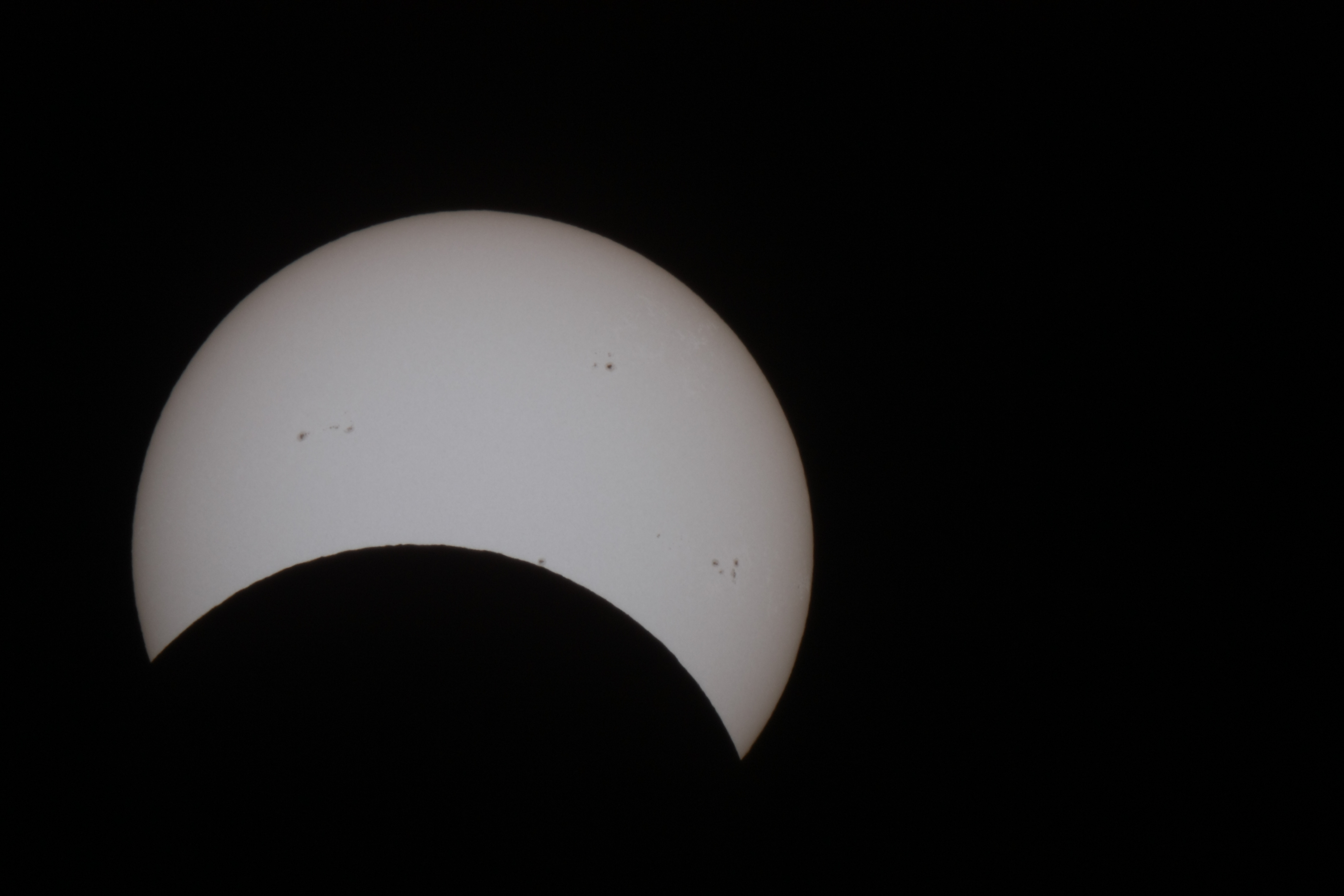
Partial from Eltham, Victoria, 21:07 UTC

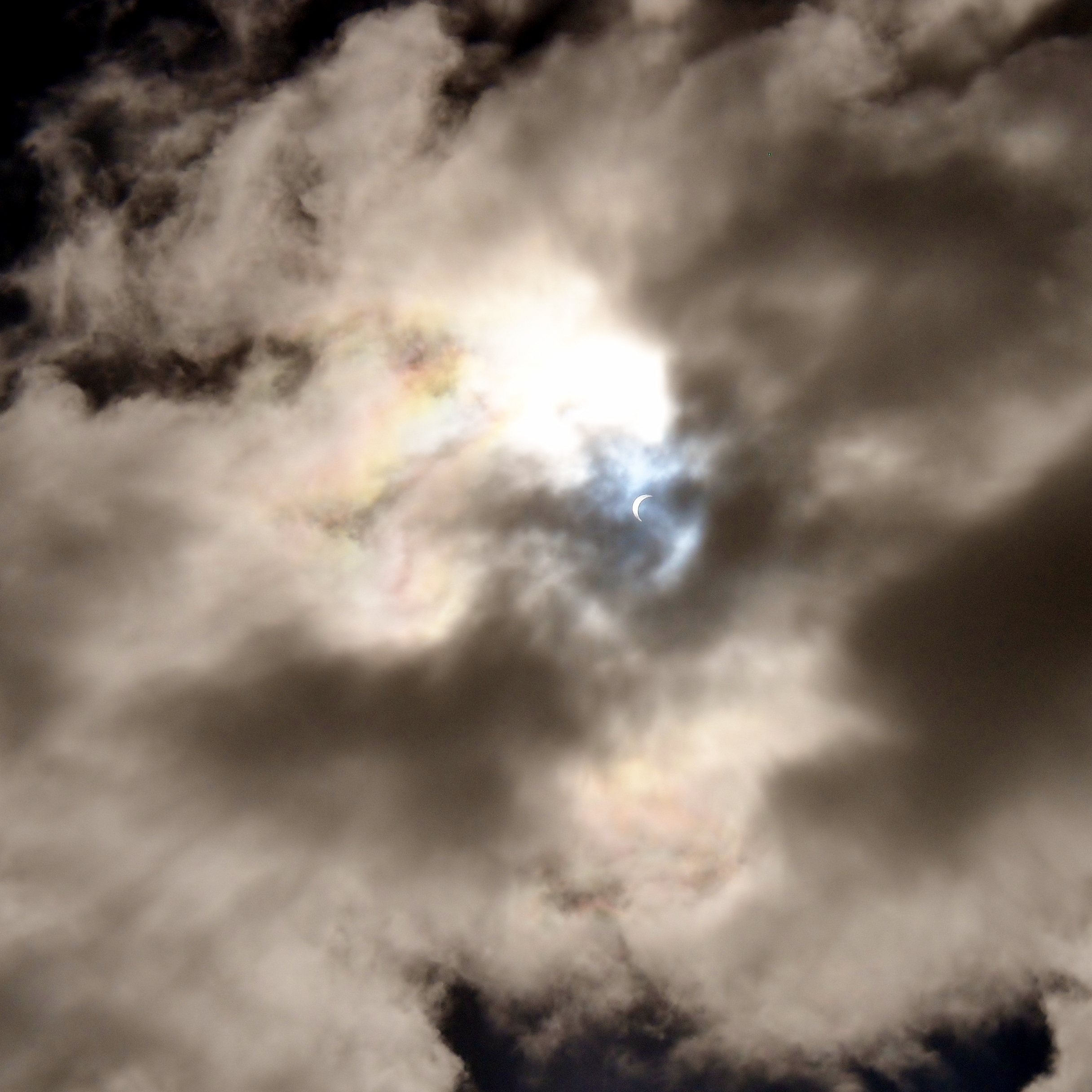
Partial from Nouméa, New Caledonia, 21:09 UTC

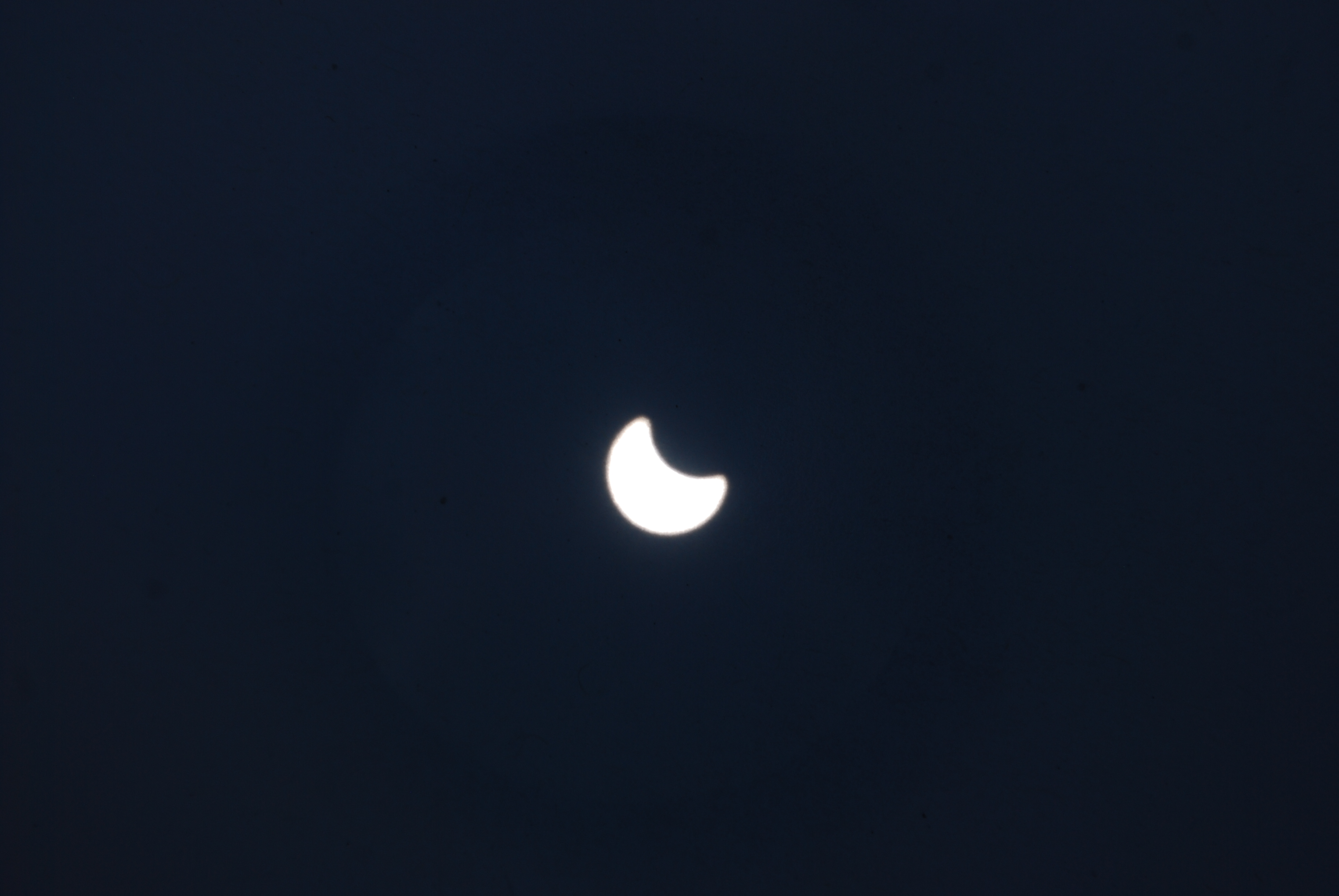
Partial from Melbourne, Australia, 21:12 UTC

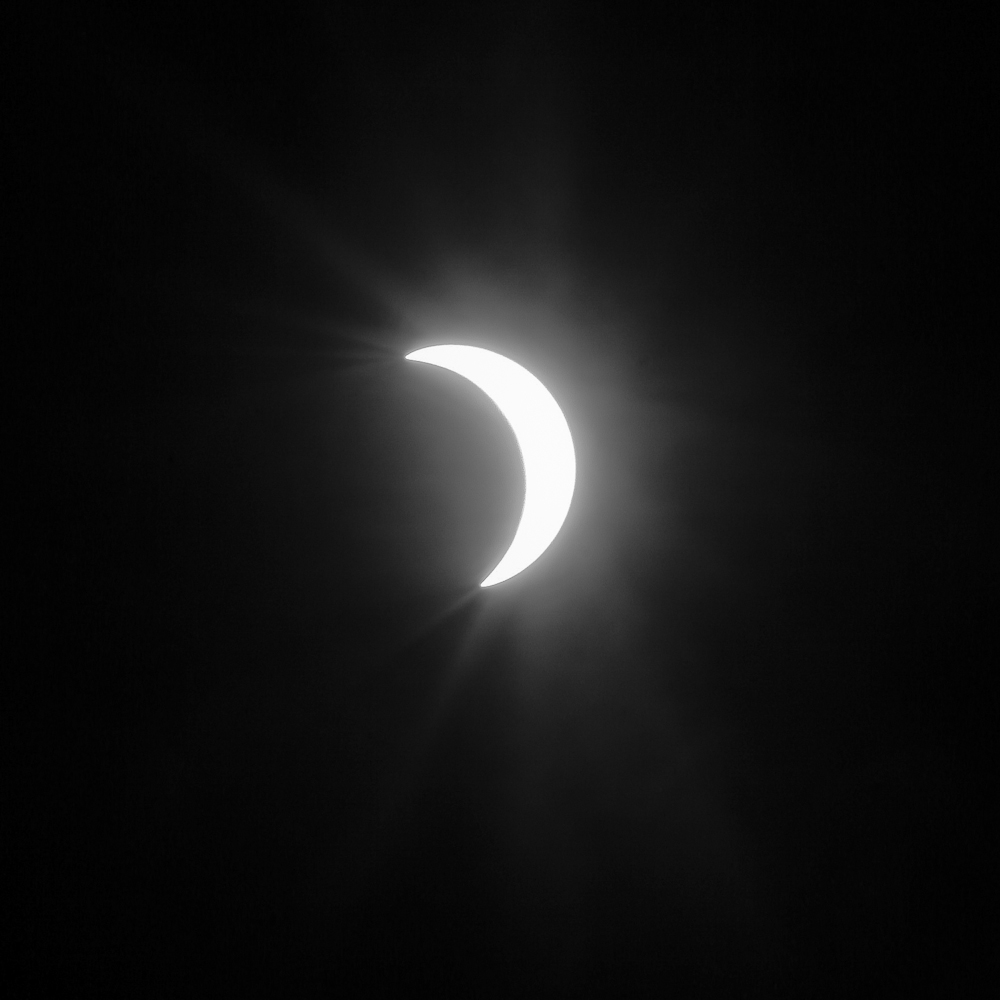
Partial from Tauranga, New Zealand, 21:23 UTC

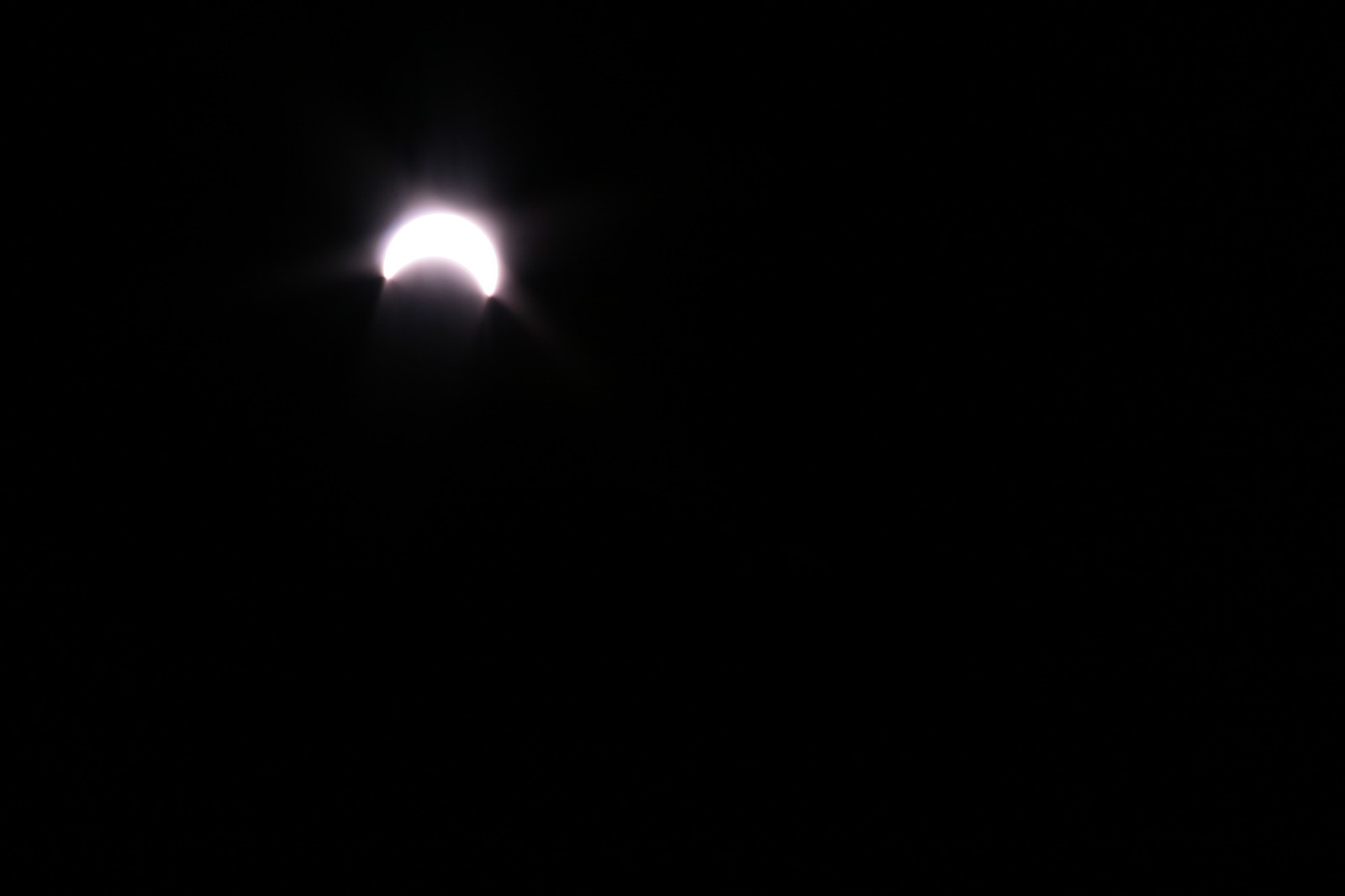
Partial from Christchurch, New Zealand, 21:29 UTC

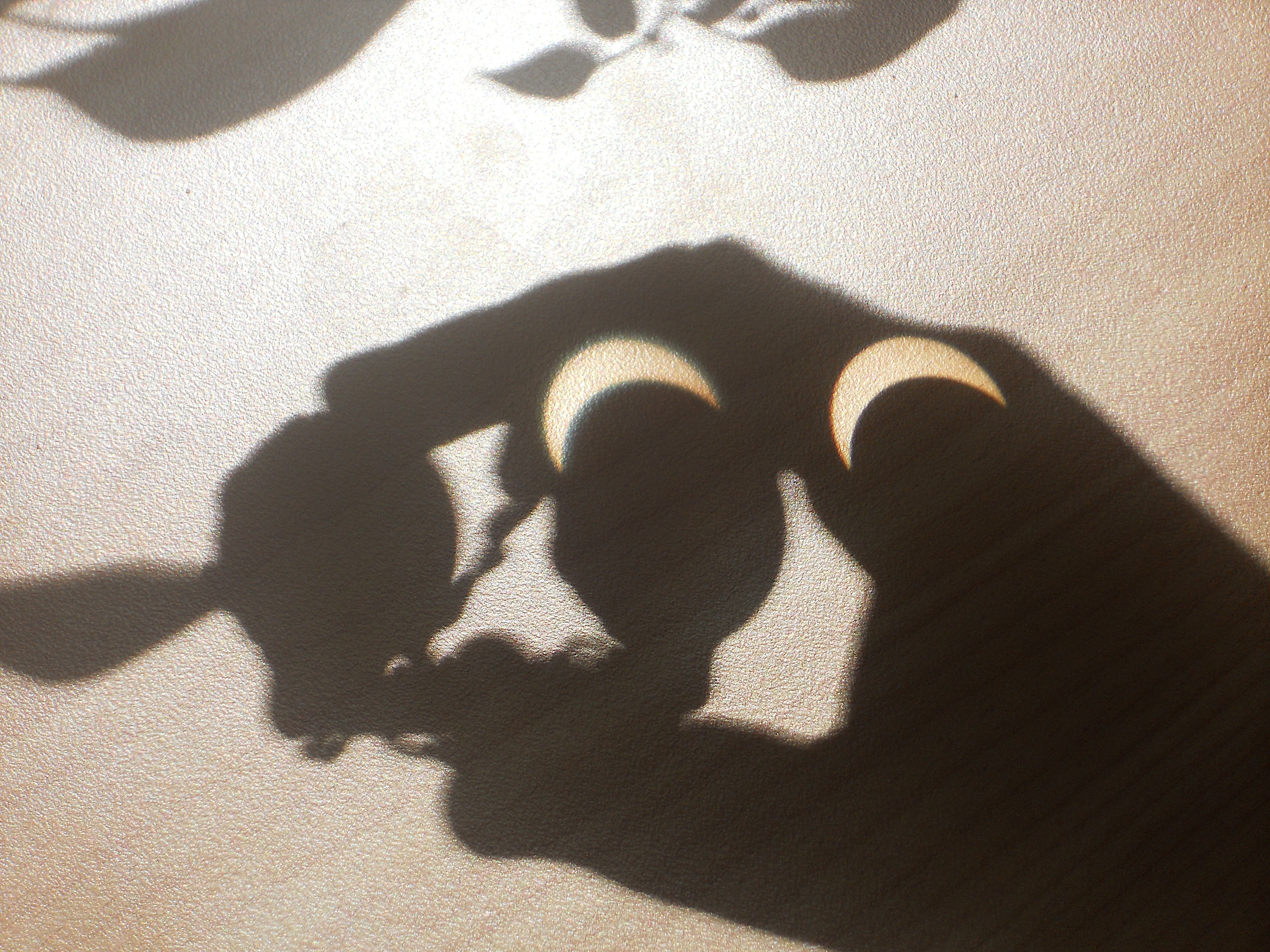
Eclipse projection from Wellington, New Zealand

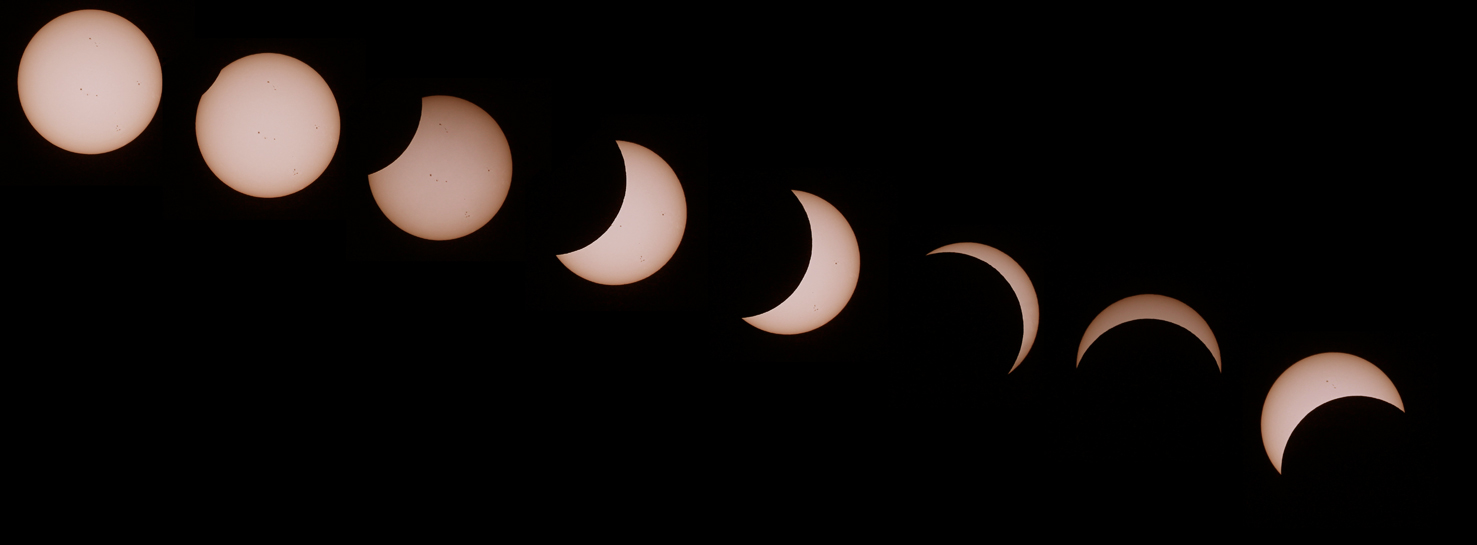
Progression from Auckland, New Zealand

== Eclipse details ==
Shown below are two tables displaying details about this particular solar eclipse. The first table outlines times at which the Moon's penumbra or umbra attains the specific parameter, and the second table describes various other parameters pertaining to this eclipse.

November 13, 2012 Solar Eclipse Times
Event	Time (UTC)
First Penumbral External Contact	2012 November 13 at 19:39:04.9 UTC
First Umbral External Contact	2012 November 13 at 20:36:15.3 UTC
First Central Line	2012 November 13 at 20:37:12.9 UTC
First Umbral Internal Contact	2012 November 13 at 20:38:10.6 UTC
First Penumbral Internal Contact	2012 November 13 at 21:44:49.3 UTC
Ecliptic Conjunction	2012 November 13 at 22:09:06.9 UTC
Greatest Eclipse	2012 November 13 at 22:12:55.2 UTC
Greatest Duration	2012 November 13 at 22:15:06.9 UTC
Equatorial Conjunction	2012 November 13 at 22:19:11.7 UTC
Last Penumbral Internal Contact	2012 November 13 at 22:40:51.6 UTC
Last Umbral Internal Contact	2012 November 13 at 23:47:34.6 UTC
Last Central Line	2012 November 13 at 23:48:32.9 UTC
Last Umbral External Contact	2012 November 13 at 23:49:31.1 UTC
Last Penumbral External Contact	2012 November 14 at 00:46:41.3 UTC

November 13, 2012 Solar Eclipse Parameters
Parameter	Value
Eclipse Magnitude	1.05004
Eclipse Obscuration	1.10259
Gamma	−0.37189
Sun Right Ascension	15h18m06.7s
Sun Declination	-18°15'02.6"
Sun Semi-Diameter	16'09.9"
Sun Equatorial Horizontal Parallax	08.9"
Moon Right Ascension	15h17m51.2s
Moon Declination	-18°37'29.5"
Moon Semi-Diameter	16'42.4"
Moon Equatorial Horizontal Parallax	1°01'19.0"
ΔT	66.8 s

== Eclipse season ==
This eclipse is part of an eclipse season, a period, roughly every six months, when eclipses occur. Only two (or occasionally three) eclipse seasons occur each year, and each season lasts about 35 days and repeats just short of six months (173 days) later; thus two full eclipse seasons always occur each year. Either two or three eclipses happen each eclipse season. In the sequence below, each eclipse is separated by a fortnight.

Eclipse season of November 2012
November 13 Ascending node (new moon)	November 28 Descending node (full moon)
Total solar eclipse Solar Saros 133	Penumbral lunar eclipse Lunar Saros 145

== Related eclipses ==
=== Eclipses in 2012 ===
- An annular solar eclipse on May 20.
- A partial lunar eclipse on June 4.
- A total solar eclipse on November 13.
- A penumbral lunar eclipse on November 28.

=== Metonic ===
- Preceded by: Solar eclipse of January 26, 2009
- Followed by: Solar eclipse of September 1, 2016

=== Tzolkinex ===
- Preceded by: Solar eclipse of October 3, 2005
- Followed by: Solar eclipse of December 26, 2019

=== Half-Saros ===
- Preceded by: Lunar eclipse of November 9, 2003
- Followed by: Lunar eclipse of November 19, 2021

=== Tritos ===
- Preceded by: Solar eclipse of December 14, 2001
- Followed by: Solar eclipse of October 14, 2023

=== Solar Saros 133 ===
- Preceded by: Solar eclipse of November 3, 1994
- Followed by: Solar eclipse of November 25, 2030

=== Inex ===
- Preceded by: Solar eclipse of December 4, 1983
- Followed by: Solar eclipse of October 25, 2041

=== Triad ===
- Preceded by: Solar eclipse of January 14, 1926
- Followed by: Solar eclipse of September 14, 2099

=== Solar eclipses of 2011–2014 ===
This eclipse is a member of a semester series. An eclipse in a semester series of solar eclipses repeats approximately every 177 days and 4 hours (a semester) at alternating nodes of the Moon's orbit.

The partial solar eclipses on January 4, 2011 and July 1, 2011 occur in the previous lunar year eclipse set.

Solar eclipse series sets from 2011 to 2014
Descending node			Ascending node		
Saros	Map	Gamma	Saros	Map	Gamma
118 Partial in Tromsø, Norway	June 1, 2011 Partial	1.21300	123 Hinode XRT footage	November 25, 2011 Partial	−1.05359
128 Annularity in Red Bluff, CA, USA	May 20, 2012 Annular	0.48279	133 Totality in Mount Carbine, Queensland, Australia	November 13, 2012 Total	−0.37189
138 Annularity in Churchills Head, Australia	May 10, 2013 Annular	−0.26937	143 Partial in Libreville, Gabon	November 3, 2013 Hybrid	0.32715
148 Partial in Adelaide, Australia	April 29, 2014 Annular (non-central)	−0.99996	153 Partial in Minneapolis, MN, USA	October 23, 2014 Partial	1.09078

=== Saros 133 ===
This eclipse is a part of Saros series 133, repeating every 18 years, 11 days, and containing 72 events. The series started with a partial solar eclipse on July 13, 1219. It contains annular eclipses from November 20, 1435 through January 13, 1526; a hybrid eclipse on January 24, 1544; and total eclipses from February 3, 1562 through June 21, 2373. The series ends at member 72 as a partial eclipse on September 5, 2499. Its eclipses are tabulated in three columns; every third eclipse in the same column is one exeligmos apart, so they all cast shadows over approximately the same parts of the Earth.

The longest duration of annularity was produced by member 25 at 1 minutes, 14 seconds on November 30, 1453, and the longest duration of totality was produced by member 61 at 6 minutes, 50 seconds on August 7, 1850. All eclipses in this series occur at the Moon’s ascending node of orbit.

Series members 34–55 occur between 1801 and 2200:
34	35	36
July 17, 1814	July 27, 1832	August 7, 1850
37	38	39
August 18, 1868	August 29, 1886	September 9, 1904
40	41	42
September 21, 1922	October 1, 1940	October 12, 1958
43	44	45
October 23, 1976	November 3, 1994	November 13, 2012
46	47	48
November 25, 2030	December 5, 2048	December 17, 2066
49	50	51
December 27, 2084	January 8, 2103	January 19, 2121
52	53	54
January 30, 2139	February 9, 2157	February 21, 2175
55
March 3, 2193

=== Metonic series ===
The metonic series repeats eclipses every 19 years (6939.69 days), lasting about 5 cycles. Eclipses occur in nearly the same calendar date. In addition, the octon subseries repeats 1/5 of that or every 3.8 years (1387.94 days). All eclipses in this table occur at the Moon's ascending node.

21 eclipse events between June 21, 1982 and June 21, 2058
June 21	April 8–9	January 26	November 13–14	September 1–2
117	119	121	123	125
June 21, 1982	April 9, 1986	January 26, 1990	November 13, 1993	September 2, 1997
127	129	131	133	135
June 21, 2001	April 8, 2005	January 26, 2009	November 13, 2012	September 1, 2016
137	139	141	143	145
June 21, 2020	April 8, 2024	January 26, 2028	November 14, 2031	September 2, 2035
147	149	151	153	155
June 21, 2039	April 9, 2043	January 26, 2047	November 14, 2050	September 2, 2054
157
June 21, 2058

=== Tritos series ===
This eclipse is a part of a tritos cycle, repeating at alternating nodes every 135 synodic months (≈ 3986.63 days, or 11 years minus 1 month). Their appearance and longitude are irregular due to a lack of synchronization with the anomalistic month (period of perigee), but groupings of 3 tritos cycles (≈ 33 years minus 3 months) come close (≈ 434.044 anomalistic months), so eclipses are similar in these groupings.

Series members between 1801 and 2200
June 26, 1805 (Saros 114)	May 27, 1816 (Saros 115)	April 26, 1827 (Saros 116)	March 25, 1838 (Saros 117)	February 23, 1849 (Saros 118)
January 23, 1860 (Saros 119)	December 22, 1870 (Saros 120)	November 21, 1881 (Saros 121)	October 20, 1892 (Saros 122)	September 21, 1903 (Saros 123)
August 21, 1914 (Saros 124)	July 20, 1925 (Saros 125)	June 19, 1936 (Saros 126)	May 20, 1947 (Saros 127)	April 19, 1958 (Saros 128)
March 18, 1969 (Saros 129)	February 16, 1980 (Saros 130)	January 15, 1991 (Saros 131)	December 14, 2001 (Saros 132)	November 13, 2012 (Saros 133)
October 14, 2023 (Saros 134)	September 12, 2034 (Saros 135)	August 12, 2045 (Saros 136)	July 12, 2056 (Saros 137)	June 11, 2067 (Saros 138)
May 11, 2078 (Saros 139)	April 10, 2089 (Saros 140)	March 10, 2100 (Saros 141)	February 8, 2111 (Saros 142)	January 8, 2122 (Saros 143)
December 7, 2132 (Saros 144)	November 7, 2143 (Saros 145)	October 7, 2154 (Saros 146)	September 5, 2165 (Saros 147)	August 4, 2176 (Saros 148)
July 6, 2187 (Saros 149)	June 4, 2198 (Saros 150)			

=== Inex series ===
This eclipse is a part of the long period inex cycle, repeating at alternating nodes, every 358 synodic months (≈ 10,571.95 days, or 29 years minus 20 days). Their appearance and longitude are irregular due to a lack of synchronization with the anomalistic month (period of perigee). However, groupings of 3 inex cycles (≈ 87 years minus 2 months) comes close (≈ 1,151.02 anomalistic months), so eclipses are similar in these groupings.

Series members between 1801 and 2200
April 4, 1810 (Saros 126)	March 15, 1839 (Saros 127)	February 23, 1868 (Saros 128)
February 1, 1897 (Saros 129)	January 14, 1926 (Saros 130)	December 25, 1954 (Saros 131)
December 4, 1983 (Saros 132)	November 13, 2012 (Saros 133)	October 25, 2041 (Saros 134)
October 4, 2070 (Saros 135)	September 14, 2099 (Saros 136)	August 25, 2128 (Saros 137)
August 5, 2157 (Saros 138)	July 16, 2186 (Saros 139)	
