= August 1944 lunar eclipse =

Enumbral lunar eclipse August 4, 1944

- Penumbral eclipse
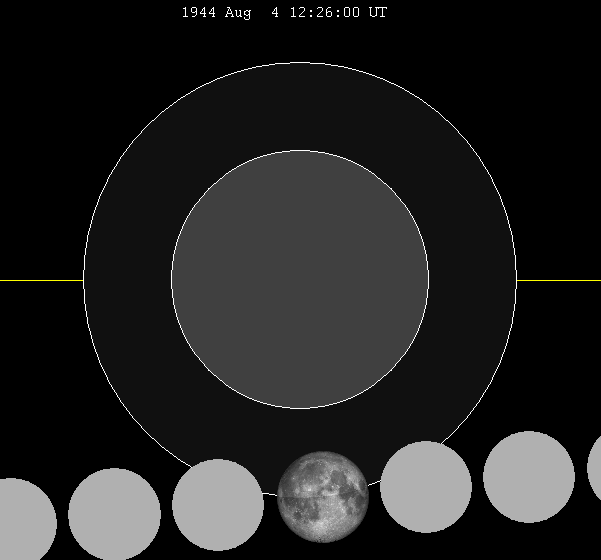
- The Moon's hourly motion shown right to left
- Date: August 4, 1944
- Gamma: −1.2843
- Magnitude: −0.4758
- Saros cycle: 147 (5 of 71)
- Penumbral: 179 minutes, 6 seconds
Contacts (UTC)
- P1: 10:56:54
- Greatest: 12:26:24
- P4: 13:56:00

A penumbral lunar eclipse occurred at the Moon's descending node of orbit on Friday, August 4, 1944, with an umbral magnitude of −0.4758. A lunar eclipse occurs when the Moon moves into the Earth's shadow, causing the Moon to be darkened. A penumbral lunar eclipse occurs when part or all of the Moon's near side passes into the Earth's penumbra. Unlike a solar eclipse, which can only be viewed from a relatively small area of the world, a lunar eclipse may be viewed from anywhere on the night side of Earth. Occurring about 1.5 days before perigee (on August 5, 1944, at 23:45 UTC), the Moon's apparent diameter was larger.

This eclipse was the third of four penumbral lunar eclipses in 1944, with the others occurring on February 9, July 6, and December 29.

== Visibility ==
The eclipse was completely visible over Australia and Antarctica, seen rising over east and south Asia and setting over western North and South America.

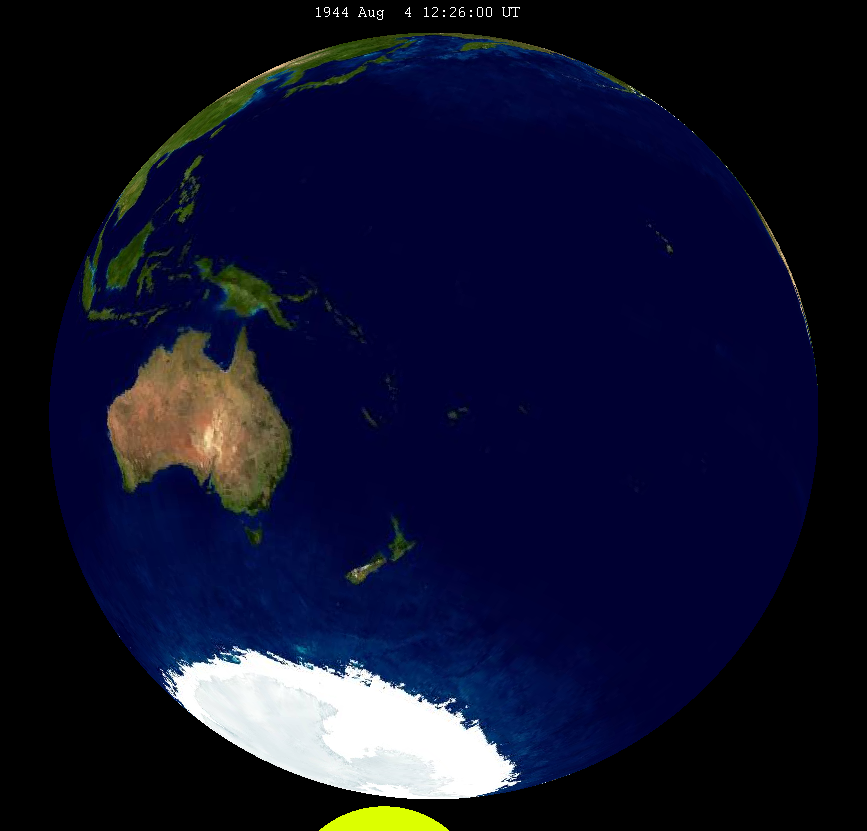
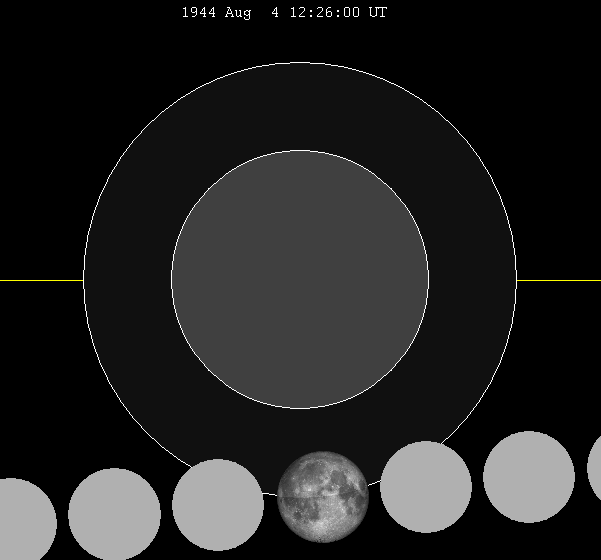

== Eclipse details ==
Shown below is a table displaying details about this particular lunar eclipse. It describes various parameters pertaining to this eclipse.

August 4, 1944 Lunar Eclipse Parameters
Parameter	Value
Penumbral Magnitude	0.47847
Umbral Magnitude	−0.47577
Gamma	−1.28428
Sun Right Ascension	08h57m44.4s
Sun Declination	+17°12'21.5"
Sun Semi-Diameter	15'46.0"
Sun Equatorial Horizontal Parallax	08.7"
Moon Right Ascension	20h58m45.5s
Moon Declination	-18°28'52.1"
Moon Semi-Diameter	16'31.4"
Moon Equatorial Horizontal Parallax	1°00'38.5"
ΔT	26.7 s

== Eclipse season ==
This eclipse is part of an eclipse season, a period, roughly every six months, when eclipses occur. Only two (or occasionally three) eclipse seasons occur each year, and each season lasts about 35 days and repeats just short of six months (173 days) later; thus two full eclipse seasons always occur each year. Either two or three eclipses happen each eclipse season. In the sequence below, each eclipse is separated by a fortnight. The first and last eclipse in this sequence is separated by one synodic month.

Eclipse season of July–August 1944
July 6 Descending node (full moon)	July 20 Ascending node (new moon)	August 4 Descending node (full moon)
Penumbral lunar eclipse Lunar Saros 109	Annular solar eclipse Solar Saros 135	Penumbral lunar eclipse Lunar Saros 147

== Related lunar eclipses ==
=== Eclipses in 1944 ===
- A total solar eclipse on January 25.
- A penumbral lunar eclipse on February 9.
- A penumbral lunar eclipse on July 6.
- An annular solar eclipse on July 20.
- A penumbral lunar eclipse on August 4.
- A penumbral lunar eclipse on December 29.

=== Metonic ===
- Preceded by: Lunar eclipse of October 16, 1940

=== Tzolkinex ===
- Followed by: Lunar eclipse of September 15, 1951

=== Half-Saros ===
- Preceded by: Solar eclipse of July 30, 1935
- Followed by: Solar eclipse of August 9, 1953

=== Tritos ===
- Preceded by: Lunar eclipse of September 4, 1933

=== Lunar Saros 147 ===
- Preceded by: Lunar eclipse of July 25, 1926
- Followed by: Lunar eclipse of August 15, 1962

=== Inex ===
- Preceded by: Lunar eclipse of August 24, 1915
- Followed by: Lunar eclipse of July 15, 1973

=== Triad ===
- Preceded by: Lunar eclipse of October 3, 1857
- Followed by: Lunar eclipse of June 5, 2031

=== Lunar eclipses of 1940–1944 ===
This eclipse is a member of a semester series. An eclipse in a semester series of lunar eclipses repeats approximately every 177 days and 4 hours (a semester) at alternating nodes of the Moon's orbit.

The penumbral lunar eclipses on April 22, 1940 and October 16, 1940 occur in the previous lunar year eclipse set, and the penumbral lunar eclipses on July 6, 1944 and December 29, 1944 occur in the next lunar year eclipse set.

Lunar eclipse series sets from 1940 to 1944
Ascending node				Descending node			
Saros	Date Viewing	Type Chart	Gamma	Saros	Date Viewing	Type Chart	Gamma
102	1940 Mar 23	Penumbral	−1.5034	107			
112	1941 Mar 13	Partial	−0.8437	117	1941 Sep 05	Partial	0.9747
122	1942 Mar 03	Total	−0.1545	127	1942 Aug 26	Total	0.1818
132	1943 Feb 20	Partial	0.5752	137	1943 Aug 15	Partial	−0.5534
142	1944 Feb 09	Penumbral	1.2698	147	1944 Aug 04	Penumbral	−1.2843

=== Saros 147 ===
This eclipse is a part of Saros series 147, repeating every 18 years, 11 days, and containing 70 events. The series started with a penumbral lunar eclipse on July 2, 1890. It contains partial eclipses from September 28, 2034 through May 27, 2431; total eclipses from June 6, 2449 through October 5, 2647; and a second set of partial eclipses from October 16, 2665 through May 1, 2990. The series ends at member 70 as a penumbral eclipse on July 28, 3145.

The longest duration of totality will be produced by member 37 at 105 minutes, 18 seconds on August 1, 2539. All eclipses in this series occur at the Moon’s descending node of orbit.

Greatest	First			
The greatest eclipse of the series will occur on 2539 Aug 01, lasting 105 minutes, 18 seconds.	Penumbral	Partial	Total	Central
The greatest eclipse of the series will occur on 2539 Aug 01, lasting 105 minutes, 18 seconds.	1890 Jul 02	2034 Sep 28	2449 Jun 06	2485 Jun 28
The greatest eclipse of the series will occur on 2539 Aug 01, lasting 105 minutes, 18 seconds.	Last			
The greatest eclipse of the series will occur on 2539 Aug 01, lasting 105 minutes, 18 seconds.	Central	Total	Partial	Penumbral
The greatest eclipse of the series will occur on 2539 Aug 01, lasting 105 minutes, 18 seconds.	2593 Sep 02	2647 Oct 05	2990 May 01	3134 Jul 28

Eclipses are tabulated in three columns; every third eclipse in the same column is one exeligmos apart, so they all cast shadows over approximately the same parts of the Earth.

Series members 1–18 occur between 1890 and 2200:
1	2	3
1890 Jul 02	1908 Jul 13	1926 Jul 25
4	5	6
1944 Aug 04	1962 Aug 15	1980 Aug 26
7	8	9
1998 Sep 06	2016 Sep 16	2034 Sep 28
10	11	12
2052 Oct 08	2070 Oct 19	2088 Oct 30
13	14	15
2106 Nov 11	2124 Nov 21	2142 Dec 03
16	17	18
2160 Dec 13	2178 Dec 24	2197 Jan 04

=== Tritos series ===
This eclipse is a part of a tritos cycle, repeating at alternating nodes every 135 synodic months (≈ 3986.63 days, or 11 years minus 1 month). Their appearance and longitude are irregular due to a lack of synchronization with the anomalistic month (period of perigee), but groupings of 3 tritos cycles (≈ 33 years minus 3 months) come close (≈ 434.044 anomalistic months), so eclipses are similar in these groupings.

Series members between 1801 and 2042
1802 Sep 11 (Saros 134)	1813 Aug 12 (Saros 135)	1824 Jul 11 (Saros 136)	1835 Jun 10 (Saros 137)	1846 May 11 (Saros 138)
1857 Apr 09 (Saros 139)	1868 Mar 08 (Saros 140)	1879 Feb 07 (Saros 141)	1890 Jan 06 (Saros 142)	1900 Dec 06 (Saros 143)
1911 Nov 06 (Saros 144)	1922 Oct 06 (Saros 145)	1933 Sep 04 (Saros 146)	1944 Aug 04 (Saros 147)	
		2042 Oct 28 (Saros 156)		

=== Inex series ===
This eclipse is a part of the long period inex cycle, repeating at alternating nodes, every 358 synodic months (≈ 10,571.95 days, or 29 years minus 20 days). Their appearance and longitude are irregular due to a lack of synchronization with the anomalistic month (period of perigee). However, groupings of 3 inex cycles (≈ 87 years minus 2 months) comes close (≈ 1,151.02 anomalistic months), so eclipses are similar in these groupings.

Series members between 1801 and 2031
1828 Oct 23 (Saros 143)	1857 Oct 03 (Saros 144)	1886 Sep 13 (Saros 145)
1915 Aug 24 (Saros 146)	1944 Aug 04 (Saros 147)	1973 Jul 15 (Saros 148)
2002 Jun 24 (Saros 149)	2031 Jun 05 (Saros 150)	

=== Half-Saros cycle ===
A lunar eclipse will be preceded and followed by solar eclipses by 9 years and 5.5 days (a half saros). This lunar eclipse is related to two total solar eclipses of Solar Saros 154.

July 30, 1935	August 9, 1953

== See also ==
- List of lunar eclipses and List of 21st-century lunar eclipses
