= September 2016 lunar eclipse =

Penumbral lunar eclipse 16 September 2016

- Penumbral eclipse
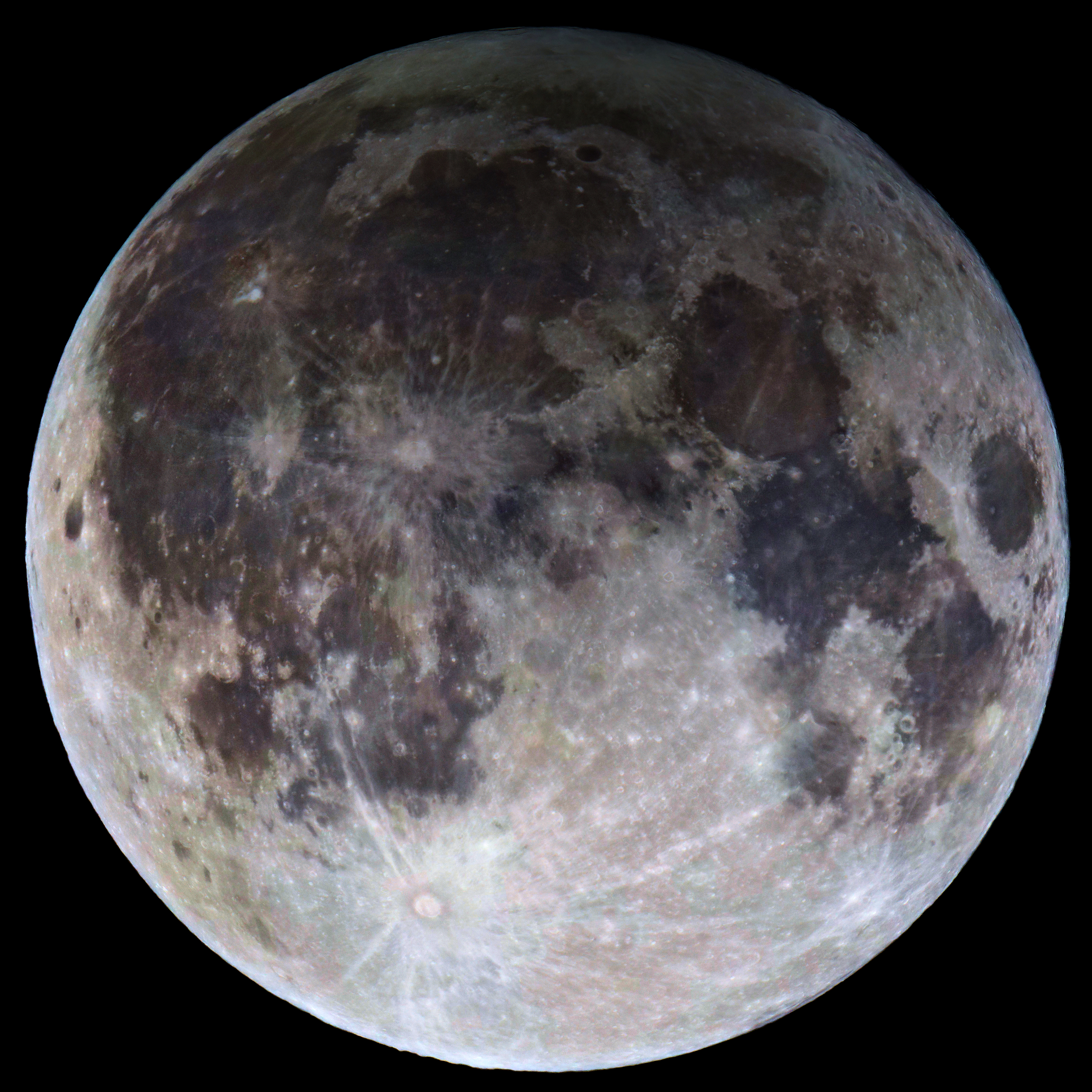
- Penumbral eclipse as viewed from Oria, Italy, 18:54 UTC
- Date: September 16, 2016
- Gamma: 1.0548
- Magnitude: −0.0624
- Saros cycle: 147 (9 of 71)
- Penumbral: 239 minutes, 17 seconds
Contacts (UTC)
- P1: 16:54:40
- Greatest: 18:54:17
- P4: 20:53:57

A penumbral lunar eclipse occurred at the Moon’s descending node of orbit on Friday, September 16, 2016, with an umbral magnitude of −0.0624. A lunar eclipse occurs when the Moon moves into the Earth's shadow, causing the Moon to be darkened. A penumbral lunar eclipse occurs when part or all of the Moon's near side passes into the Earth's penumbra. Unlike a solar eclipse, which can only be viewed from a relatively small area of the world, a lunar eclipse may be viewed from anywhere on the night side of Earth. Occurring about 1.8 days before perigee (on September 18, 2016, at 13:00 UTC), the Moon's apparent diameter was larger.

== Visibility ==
The eclipse was completely visible over east Africa, eastern Europe, Asia, and western Australia, seen rising over west Africa and western Europe and setting over eastern Australia and the western Pacific Ocean.

Hourly motion shown right to left
Visibility map

== Gallery ==
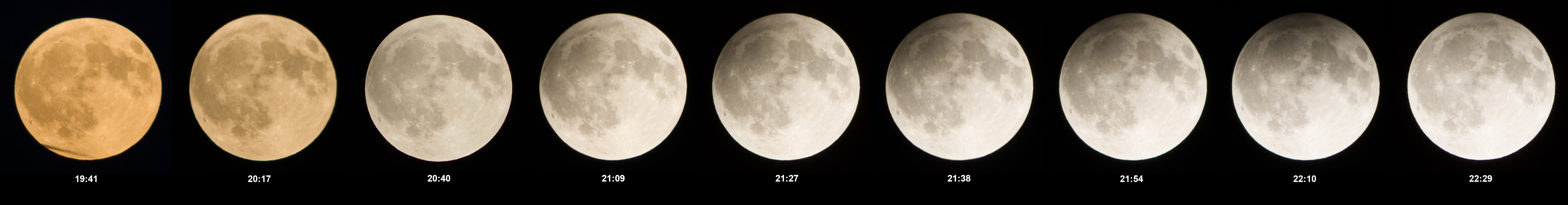
Progression as seen from Primorsko, Bulgaria

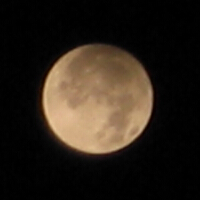
Hefei, China, 18:03 UTC

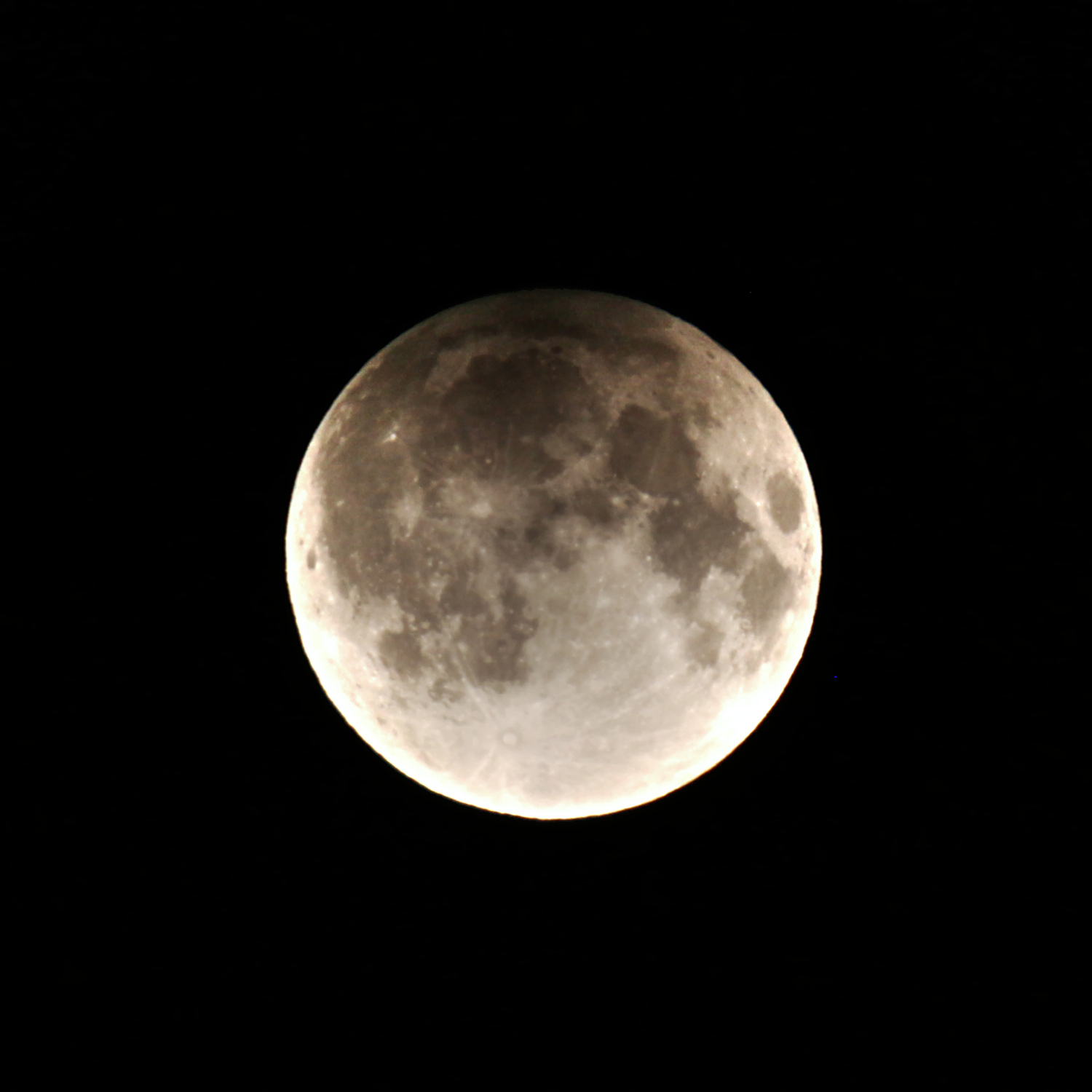
Huittinen, Finland, 18:51 UTC

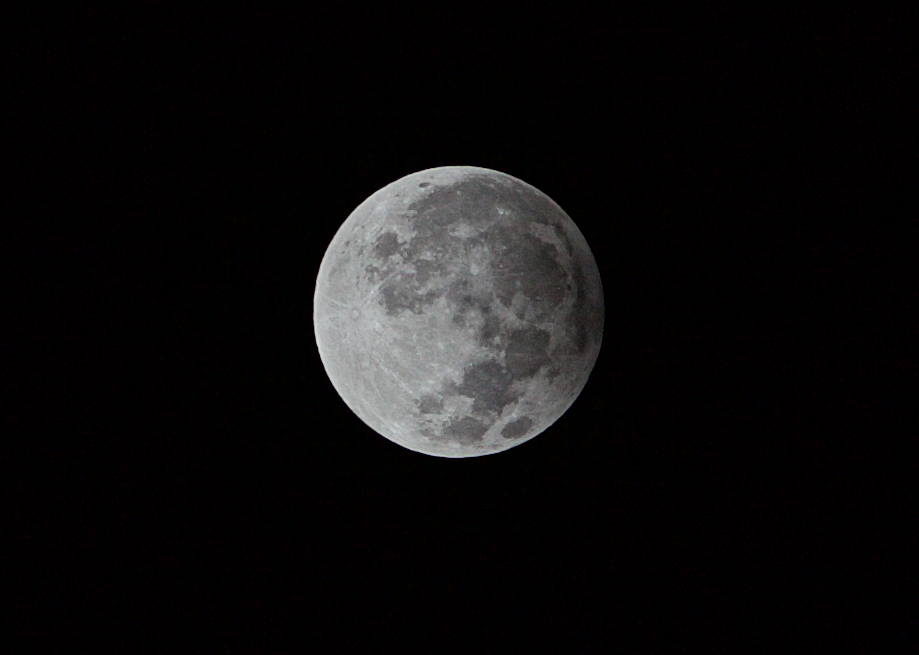
Hong Kong, 19:00 UTC

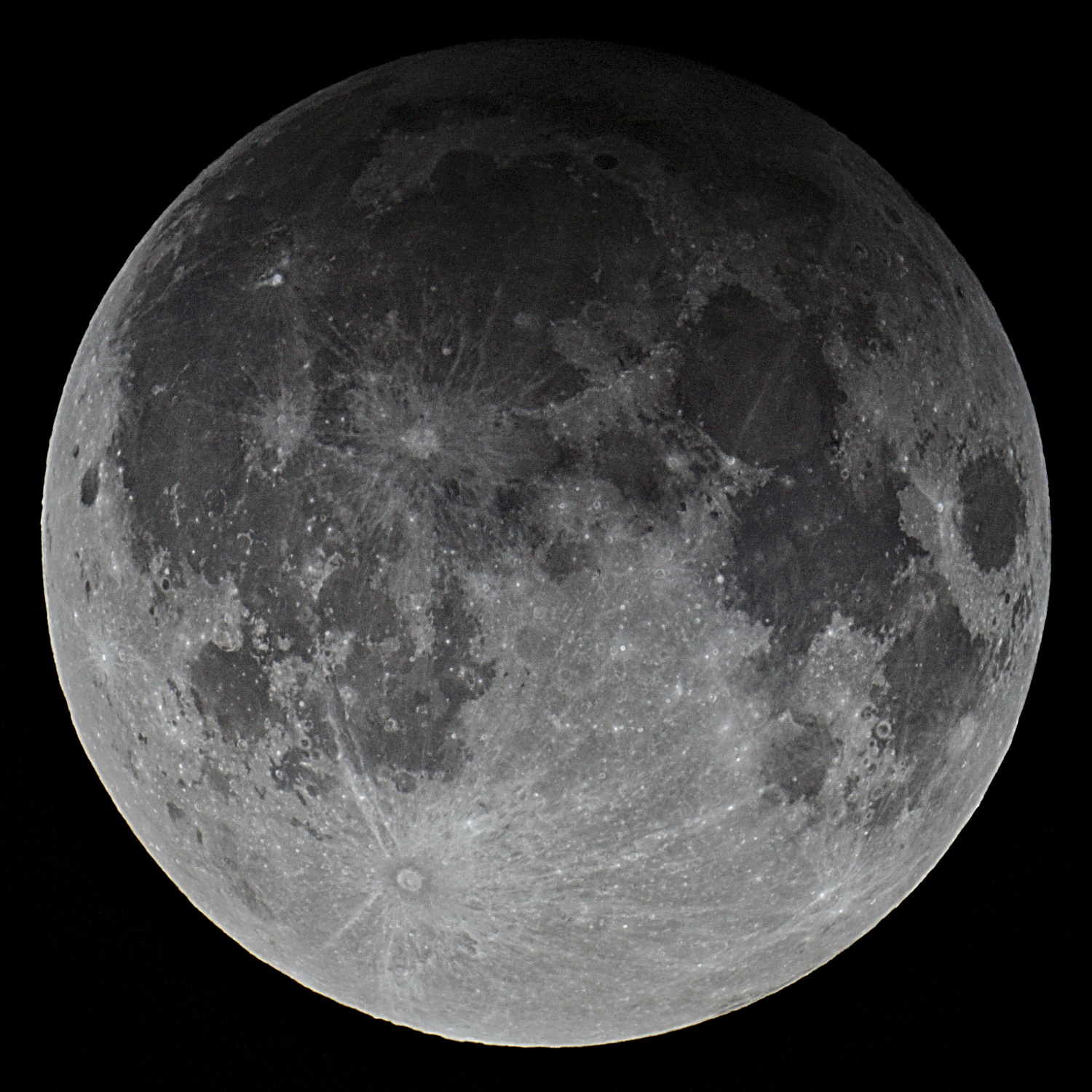
Rabka-Zdrój, Poland, 19:09 UTC

Belfort, France, combined images

Progression from Belfort, France

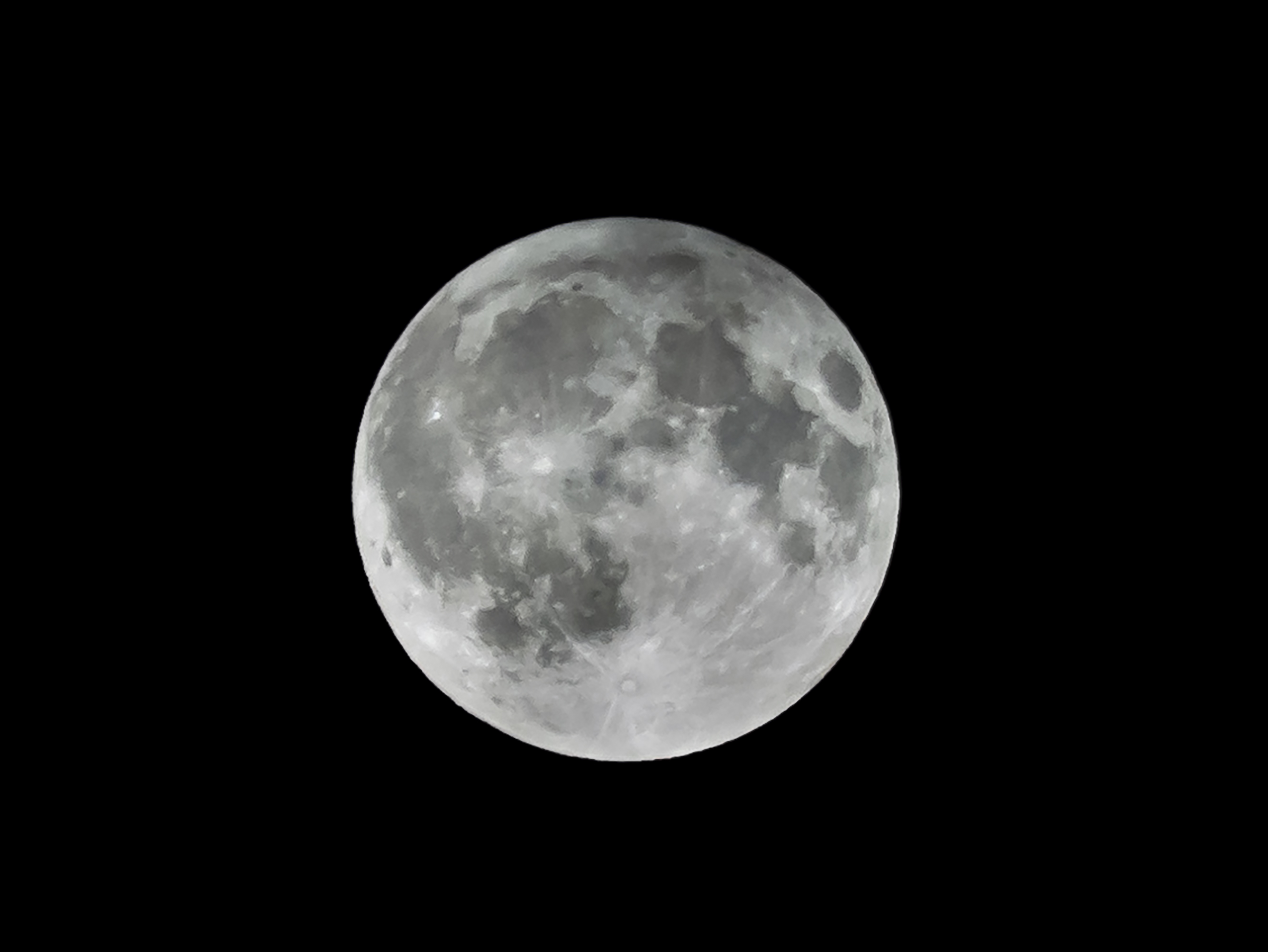
Helmshore, England, 20:04 UTC

== Eclipse details ==
Shown below is a table displaying details about this particular lunar eclipse. It describes various parameters pertaining to this eclipse.

September 16, 2016 Lunar Eclipse Parameters
Parameter	Value
Penumbral Magnitude	0.90912
Umbral Magnitude	−0.06240
Gamma	−1.05491
Sun Right Ascension	11h39m09.7s
Sun Declination	+02°15'14.2"
Sun Semi-Diameter	15'54.8"
Sun Equatorial Horizontal Parallax	08.7"
Moon Right Ascension	23h40m27.3s
Moon Declination	-03°15'36.5"
Moon Semi-Diameter	16'22.8"
Moon Equatorial Horizontal Parallax	1°00'06.8"
ΔT	68.2 s

== Eclipse season ==
This eclipse is part of an eclipse season, a period, roughly every six months, when eclipses occur. Only two (or occasionally three) eclipse seasons occur each year, and each season lasts about 35 days and repeats just short of six months (173 days) later; thus two full eclipse seasons always occur each year. Either two or three eclipses happen each eclipse season. In the sequence below, each eclipse is separated by a fortnight. The first and last eclipse in this sequence is separated by one synodic month.

Eclipse season of August–September 2016
August 18 Descending node (full moon)	September 1 Ascending node (new moon)	September 16 Descending node (full moon)
Penumbral lunar eclipse Lunar Saros 109	Annular solar eclipse Solar Saros 135	Penumbral lunar eclipse Lunar Saros 147

== Related eclipses ==
=== Eclipses in 2016 ===
- A total solar eclipse on March 9.
- A penumbral lunar eclipse on March 23.
- A penumbral lunar eclipse on August 18.
- An annular solar eclipse on September 1.
- A penumbral lunar eclipse on September 16.

=== Metonic ===
- Preceded by: Lunar eclipse of November 28, 2012
- Followed by: Lunar eclipse of July 5, 2020

=== Tzolkinex ===
- Preceded by: Lunar eclipse of August 6, 2009
- Followed by: Lunar eclipse of October 28, 2023

=== Half-Saros ===
- Preceded by: Solar eclipse of September 11, 2007
- Followed by: Solar eclipse of September 21, 2025

=== Tritos ===
- Preceded by: Lunar eclipse of October 17, 2005
- Followed by: Lunar eclipse of August 17, 2027

=== Lunar Saros 147 ===
- Preceded by: Lunar eclipse of September 6, 1998
- Followed by: Lunar eclipse of September 28, 2034

=== Inex ===
- Preceded by: Lunar eclipse of October 7, 1987
- Followed by: Lunar eclipse of August 27, 2045

=== Triad ===
- Preceded by: Lunar eclipse of November 17, 1929
- Followed by: Lunar eclipse of July 19, 2103

=== Lunar eclipses of 2013–2016 ===
This eclipse is a member of a semester series. An eclipse in a semester series of lunar eclipses repeats approximately every 177 days and 4 hours (a semester) at alternating nodes of the Moon's orbit.

The penumbral lunar eclipse on May 25, 2013 occurs in the previous lunar year eclipse set, and the penumbral lunar eclipse on August 18, 2016 occurs in the next lunar year eclipse set.

Lunar eclipse series sets from 2013 to 2016
Ascending node				Descending node			
Saros	Date Viewing	Type Chart	Gamma	Saros	Date Viewing	Type Chart	Gamma
112	2013 Apr 25	Partial	−1.0121	117	2013 Oct 18	Penumbral	1.1508
122	2014 Apr 15	Total	−0.3017	127	2014 Oct 08	Total	0.3827
132	2015 Apr 04	Total	0.4460	137	2015 Sep 28	Total	−0.3296
142	2016 Mar 23	Penumbral	1.1592	147	2016 Sep 16	Penumbral	−1.0549

=== Saros 147 ===
This eclipse is a part of Saros series 147, repeating every 18 years, 11 days, and containing 70 events. The series started with a penumbral lunar eclipse on July 2, 1890. It contains partial eclipses from September 28, 2034 through May 27, 2431; total eclipses from June 6, 2449 through October 5, 2647; and a second set of partial eclipses from October 16, 2665 through May 1, 2990. The series ends at member 70 as a penumbral eclipse on July 28, 3145.

The longest duration of totality will be produced by member 37 at 105 minutes, 18 seconds on August 1, 2539. All eclipses in this series occur at the Moon’s descending node of orbit.

Greatest	First			
The greatest eclipse of the series will occur on 2539 Aug 01, lasting 105 minutes, 18 seconds.	Penumbral	Partial	Total	Central
The greatest eclipse of the series will occur on 2539 Aug 01, lasting 105 minutes, 18 seconds.	1890 Jul 02	2034 Sep 28	2449 Jun 06	2485 Jun 28
The greatest eclipse of the series will occur on 2539 Aug 01, lasting 105 minutes, 18 seconds.	Last			
The greatest eclipse of the series will occur on 2539 Aug 01, lasting 105 minutes, 18 seconds.	Central	Total	Partial	Penumbral
The greatest eclipse of the series will occur on 2539 Aug 01, lasting 105 minutes, 18 seconds.	2593 Sep 02	2647 Oct 05	2990 May 01	3134 Jul 28

Eclipses are tabulated in three columns; every third eclipse in the same column is one exeligmos apart, so they all cast shadows over approximately the same parts of the Earth.

Series members 1–18 occur between 1890 and 2200:
1	2	3
1890 Jul 02	1908 Jul 13	1926 Jul 25
4	5	6
1944 Aug 04	1962 Aug 15	1980 Aug 26
7	8	9
1998 Sep 06	2016 Sep 16	2034 Sep 28
10	11	12
2052 Oct 08	2070 Oct 19	2088 Oct 30
13	14	15
2106 Nov 11	2124 Nov 21	2142 Dec 03
16	17	18
2160 Dec 13	2178 Dec 24	2197 Jan 04

=== Tritos series ===
This eclipse is a part of a tritos cycle, repeating at alternating nodes every 135 synodic months (≈ 3986.63 days, or 11 years minus 1 month). Their appearance and longitude are irregular due to a lack of synchronization with the anomalistic month (period of perigee), but groupings of 3 tritos cycles (≈ 33 years minus 3 months) come close (≈ 434.044 anomalistic months), so eclipses are similar in these groupings.

Series members between 1801 and 2147
1809 Apr 30 (Saros 128)	1820 Mar 29 (Saros 129)	1831 Feb 26 (Saros 130)	1842 Jan 26 (Saros 131)	1852 Dec 26 (Saros 132)
1863 Nov 25 (Saros 133)	1874 Oct 25 (Saros 134)	1885 Sep 24 (Saros 135)	1896 Aug 23 (Saros 136)	1907 Jul 25 (Saros 137)
1918 Jun 24 (Saros 138)	1929 May 23 (Saros 139)	1940 Apr 22 (Saros 140)	1951 Mar 23 (Saros 141)	1962 Feb 19 (Saros 142)
1973 Jan 18 (Saros 143)	1983 Dec 20 (Saros 144)	1994 Nov 18 (Saros 145)	2005 Oct 17 (Saros 146)	2016 Sep 16 (Saros 147)
2027 Aug 17 (Saros 148)	2038 Jul 16 (Saros 149)	2049 Jun 15 (Saros 150)		
			2114 Dec 12 (Saros 156)	
	2147 Sep 09 (Saros 159)			

=== Inex series ===
This eclipse is a part of the long period inex cycle, repeating at alternating nodes, every 358 synodic months (≈ 10,571.95 days, or 29 years minus 20 days). Their appearance and longitude are irregular due to a lack of synchronization with the anomalistic month (period of perigee). However, groupings of 3 inex cycles (≈ 87 years minus 2 months) comes close (≈ 1,151.02 anomalistic months), so eclipses are similar in these groupings.

Series members between 1801 and 2200
1814 Feb 04 (Saros 140)	1843 Jan 16 (Saros 141)	1871 Dec 26 (Saros 142)
1900 Dec 06 (Saros 143)	1929 Nov 17 (Saros 144)	1958 Oct 27 (Saros 145)
1987 Oct 07 (Saros 146)	2016 Sep 16 (Saros 147)	2045 Aug 27 (Saros 148)
2074 Aug 07 (Saros 149)	2103 Jul 19 (Saros 150)	2132 Jun 28 (Saros 151)
2161 Jun 08 (Saros 152)	2190 May 19 (Saros 153)	

=== Half-Saros cycle ===
A lunar eclipse will be preceded and followed by solar eclipses by 9 years and 5.5 days (a half saros). This lunar eclipse is related to two partial solar eclipses of Solar Saros 154.

September 11, 2007	September 21, 2025

== See also ==
- March 2016 lunar eclipse, the first 2016 lunar eclipse (penumbral)
- August 2016 lunar eclipse, the second 2016 lunar eclipse (penumbral)
- List of lunar eclipses and List of 21st-century lunar eclipses
