= September 1998 lunar eclipse =

Penumbral lunar eclipse September 6, 1998

- Penumbral eclipse
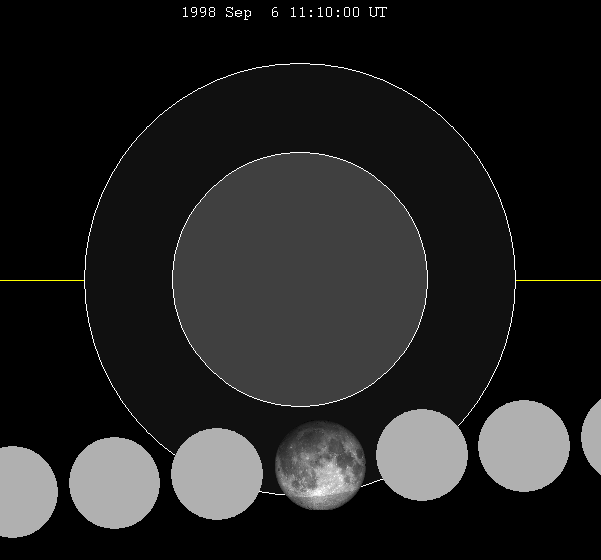
- The Moon's hourly motion shown right to left
- Date: September 6, 1998
- Gamma: −1.1058
- Magnitude: −0.1544
- Saros cycle: 147 (8 of 71)
- Penumbral: 227 minutes, 46 seconds
Contacts (UTC)
- P1: 9:16:16
- Greatest: 11:10:07
- P4: 13:04:02

A penumbral lunar eclipse occurred at the Moon’s descending node of orbit on Sunday, September 6, 1998, with an umbral magnitude of −0.1544. A lunar eclipse occurs when the Moon moves into the Earth's shadow, causing the Moon to be darkened. A penumbral lunar eclipse occurs when part or all of the Moon's near side passes into the Earth's penumbra. Unlike a solar eclipse, which can only be viewed from a relatively small area of the world, a lunar eclipse may be viewed from anywhere on the night side of Earth. Occurring about 1.8 days before perigee (on September 8, 1998, at 7:00 UTC), the Moon's apparent diameter was larger.

== Visibility ==
The eclipse was completely visible over northeast Asia, much of Australia, western North America and the Pacific Ocean, seen rising over east and southeast Asia and western Australia and setting over much of North and South America.

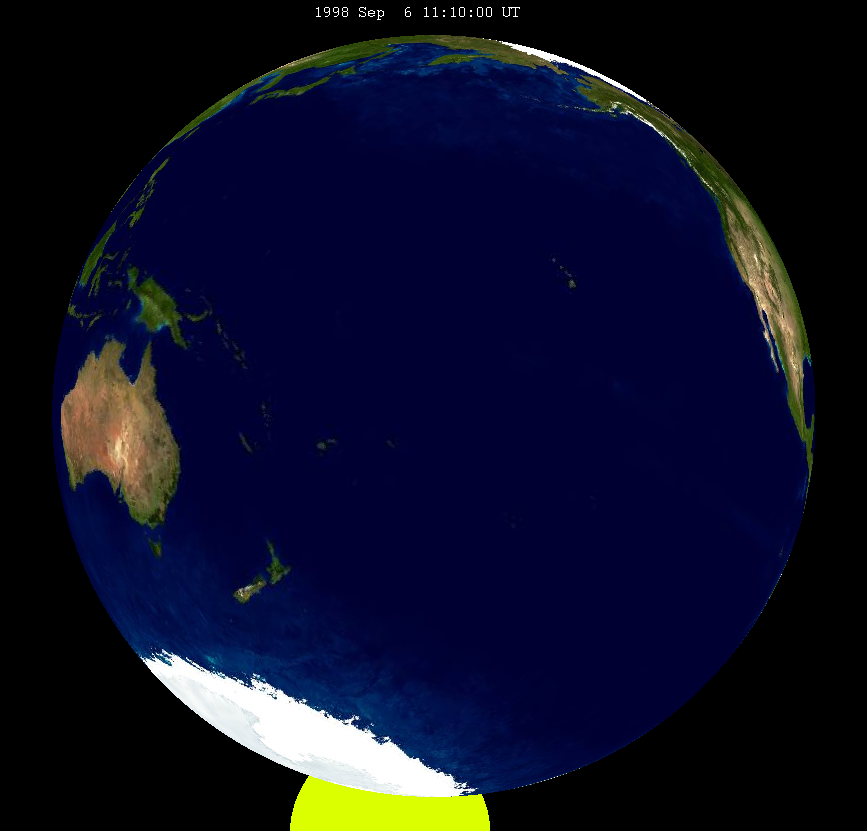
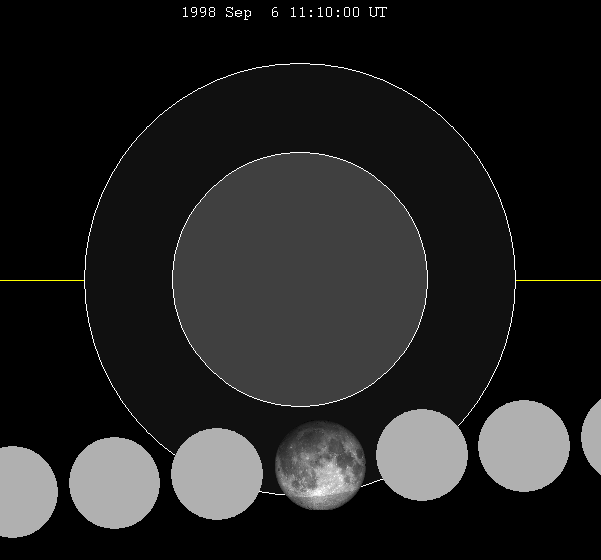

== Eclipse details ==
Shown below is a table displaying details about this particular solar eclipse. It describes various parameters pertaining to this eclipse.

September 6, 1998 Lunar Eclipse Parameters
Parameter	Value
Penumbral Magnitude	0.81217
Umbral Magnitude	−0.15437
Gamma	−1.10579
Sun Right Ascension	10h59m47.2s
Sun Declination	+06°25'26.3"
Sun Semi-Diameter	15'52.1"
Sun Equatorial Horizontal Parallax	08.7"
Moon Right Ascension	23h01m06.1s
Moon Declination	-07°29'07.2"
Moon Semi-Diameter	16'25.0"
Moon Equatorial Horizontal Parallax	1°00'15.2"
ΔT	63.3 s

== Eclipse season ==
This eclipse is part of an eclipse season, a period, roughly every six months, when eclipses occur. Only two (or occasionally three) eclipse seasons occur each year, and each season lasts about 35 days and repeats just short of six months (173 days) later; thus two full eclipse seasons always occur each year. Either two or three eclipses happen each eclipse season. In the sequence below, each eclipse is separated by a fortnight. The first and last eclipse in this sequence is separated by one synodic month.

Eclipse season of August–September 1998
August 8 Descending node (full moon)	August 22 Ascending node (new moon)	September 6 Descending node (full moon)
Penumbral lunar eclipse Lunar Saros 109	Annular solar eclipse Solar Saros 135	Penumbral lunar eclipse Lunar Saros 147

== Related eclipses ==
=== Eclipses in 1998 ===
- A total solar eclipse on February 26.
- A penumbral lunar eclipse on March 13.
- A penumbral lunar eclipse on August 8.
- An annular solar eclipse on August 22.
- A penumbral lunar eclipse on September 6.

=== Metonic ===
- Preceded by: Lunar eclipse of November 18, 1994
- Followed by: Lunar eclipse of June 24, 2002

=== Tzolkinex ===
- Preceded by: Lunar eclipse of July 26, 1991
- Followed by: Lunar eclipse of October 17, 2005

=== Half-Saros ===
- Preceded by: Solar eclipse of August 31, 1989
- Followed by: Solar eclipse of September 11, 2007

=== Tritos ===
- Preceded by: Lunar eclipse of October 7, 1987
- Followed by: Lunar eclipse of August 6, 2009

=== Lunar Saros 147 ===
- Preceded by: Lunar eclipse of August 26, 1980
- Followed by: Lunar eclipse of September 16, 2016

=== Inex ===
- Preceded by: Lunar eclipse of September 25, 1969
- Followed by: Lunar eclipse of August 17, 2027

=== Triad ===
- Preceded by: Lunar eclipse of November 6, 1911
- Followed by: Lunar eclipse of July 7, 2085

=== Lunar eclipses of 1995–1998 ===
This eclipse is a member of a semester series. An eclipse in a semester series of lunar eclipses repeats approximately every 177 days and 4 hours (a semester) at alternating nodes of the Moon's orbit.

The penumbral lunar eclipse on August 8, 1998 occurs in the next lunar year eclipse set.

Lunar eclipse series sets from 1995 to 1998
Ascending node				Descending node			
Saros	Date Viewing	Type Chart	Gamma	Saros	Date Viewing	Type Chart	Gamma
112	1995 Apr 15	Partial	−0.9594	117	1995 Oct 08	Penumbral	1.1179
122	1996 Apr 04	Total	−0.2534	127	1996 Sep 27	Total	0.3426
132	1997 Mar 24	Partial	0.4899	137	1997 Sep 16	Total	−0.3768
142	1998 Mar 13	Penumbral	1.1964	147	1998 Sep 06	Penumbral	−1.1058

=== Saros 147 ===
This eclipse is a part of Saros series 147, repeating every 18 years, 11 days, and containing 70 events. The series started with a penumbral lunar eclipse on July 2, 1890. It contains partial eclipses from September 28, 2034 through May 27, 2431; total eclipses from June 6, 2449 through October 5, 2647; and a second set of partial eclipses from October 16, 2665 through May 1, 2990. The series ends at member 70 as a penumbral eclipse on July 28, 3145.

The longest duration of totality will be produced by member 37 at 105 minutes, 18 seconds on August 1, 2539. All eclipses in this series occur at the Moon’s descending node of orbit.

Greatest	First			
The greatest eclipse of the series will occur on 2539 Aug 01, lasting 105 minutes, 18 seconds.	Penumbral	Partial	Total	Central
The greatest eclipse of the series will occur on 2539 Aug 01, lasting 105 minutes, 18 seconds.	1890 Jul 02	2034 Sep 28	2449 Jun 06	2485 Jun 28
The greatest eclipse of the series will occur on 2539 Aug 01, lasting 105 minutes, 18 seconds.	Last			
The greatest eclipse of the series will occur on 2539 Aug 01, lasting 105 minutes, 18 seconds.	Central	Total	Partial	Penumbral
The greatest eclipse of the series will occur on 2539 Aug 01, lasting 105 minutes, 18 seconds.	2593 Sep 02	2647 Oct 05	2990 May 01	3134 Jul 28

Eclipses are tabulated in three columns; every third eclipse in the same column is one exeligmos apart, so they all cast shadows over approximately the same parts of the Earth.

Series members 1–18 occur between 1890 and 2200:
1	2	3
1890 Jul 02	1908 Jul 13	1926 Jul 25
4	5	6
1944 Aug 04	1962 Aug 15	1980 Aug 26
7	8	9
1998 Sep 06	2016 Sep 16	2034 Sep 28
10	11	12
2052 Oct 08	2070 Oct 19	2088 Oct 30
13	14	15
2106 Nov 11	2124 Nov 21	2142 Dec 03
16	17	18
2160 Dec 13	2178 Dec 24	2197 Jan 04

=== Tritos series ===
This eclipse is a part of a tritos cycle, repeating at alternating nodes every 135 synodic months (≈ 3986.63 days, or 11 years minus 1 month). Their appearance and longitude are irregular due to a lack of synchronization with the anomalistic month (period of perigee), but groupings of 3 tritos cycles (≈ 33 years minus 3 months) come close (≈ 434.044 anomalistic months), so eclipses are similar in these groupings.

Series members between 1801 and 2096
1802 Mar 19 (Saros 129)	1813 Feb 15 (Saros 130)	1824 Jan 16 (Saros 131)	1834 Dec 16 (Saros 132)	1845 Nov 14 (Saros 133)
1856 Oct 13 (Saros 134)	1867 Sep 14 (Saros 135)	1878 Aug 13 (Saros 136)	1889 Jul 12 (Saros 137)	1900 Jun 13 (Saros 138)
1911 May 13 (Saros 139)	1922 Apr 11 (Saros 140)	1933 Mar 12 (Saros 141)	1944 Feb 09 (Saros 142)	1955 Jan 08 (Saros 143)
1965 Dec 08 (Saros 144)	1976 Nov 06 (Saros 145)	1987 Oct 07 (Saros 146)	1998 Sep 06 (Saros 147)	2009 Aug 06 (Saros 148)
2020 Jul 05 (Saros 149)	2031 Jun 05 (Saros 150)			
		2096 Nov 29 (Saros 156)		

=== Inex series ===
This eclipse is a part of the long period inex cycle, repeating at alternating nodes, every 358 synodic months (≈ 10,571.95 days, or 29 years minus 20 days). Their appearance and longitude are irregular due to a lack of synchronization with the anomalistic month (period of perigee). However, groupings of 3 inex cycles (≈ 87 years minus 2 months) comes close (≈ 1,151.02 anomalistic months), so eclipses are similar in these groupings.

Series members between 1801 and 2200
1825 Jan 04 (Saros 141)	1853 Dec 15 (Saros 142)	1882 Nov 25 (Saros 143)
1911 Nov 06 (Saros 144)	1940 Oct 16 (Saros 145)	1969 Sep 25 (Saros 146)
1998 Sep 06 (Saros 147)	2027 Aug 17 (Saros 148)	2056 Jul 26 (Saros 149)
2085 Jul 07 (Saros 150)	2114 Jun 18 (Saros 151)	2143 May 28 (Saros 152)
2172 May 08 (Saros 153)

=== Half-Saros cycle ===
A lunar eclipse will be preceded and followed by solar eclipses by 9 years and 5.5 days (a half saros). This lunar eclipse is related to two partial solar eclipses of Solar Saros 154.

August 31, 1989	September 11, 2007

== See also ==
- List of lunar eclipses
- List of 20th-century lunar eclipses
