= Solar eclipse of August 31, 1989 =

20th-century partial solar eclipse

- Partial eclipse
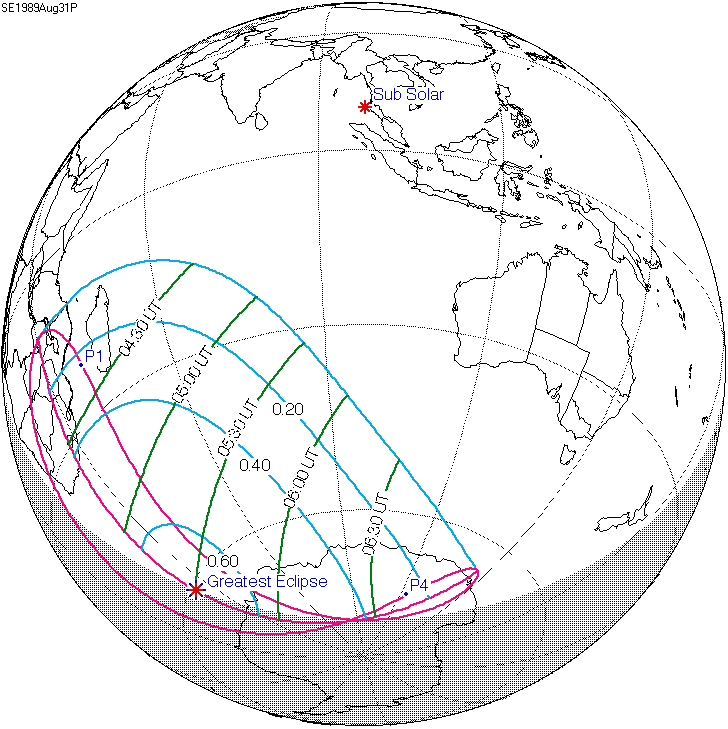
- Map
- Gamma: −1.1928
- Magnitude: 0.6344

Maximum eclipse
- Coordinates: 61.3°S 23.6°E

Times (UTC)
- Greatest eclipse: 5:31:47

References
- Saros: 154 (5 of 71)
- Catalog # (SE5000): 9485

A partial solar eclipse occurred at the Moon's descending node of orbit on Thursday, August 31, 1989, with a magnitude of 0.6344. A solar eclipse occurs when the Moon passes between Earth and the Sun, thereby totally or partly obscuring the image of the Sun for a viewer on Earth. A partial solar eclipse occurs in the polar regions of the Earth when the center of the Moon's shadow misses the Earth.

A partial eclipse was visible for parts of Southern Africa and Antarctica.

== Eclipse timing ==
=== Places experiencing partial eclipse ===
Solar Eclipse of August 31, 1989 (Local Times)
Country or territory	City or place	Start of partial eclipse	Maximum eclipse	End of partial eclipse	Duration of eclipse (hr:min)	Maximum coverage
Comoros	Moroni	06:49:14	07:06:10	07:23:39	0:34	0.53%
Malawi	Lilongwe	05:50:33 (sunrise)	06:07:30	06:32:48	0:42	1.97%
Mayotte	Mamoudzou	06:44:49	07:08:19	07:32:52	0:48	1.39%
Mozambique	Nampula	05:38:48	06:09:46	06:42:38	1:04	3.78%
Zimbabwe	Harare	06:03:55 (sunrise)	06:12:24	06:49:08	0:45	6.32%
Mozambique	Beira	05:50:06 (sunrise)	06:15:37	06:59:34	1:09	9.94%
Zambia	Lusaka	06:13:26 (sunrise)	06:15:39	06:36:20	0:23	2.44%
Madagascar	Toamasina	06:37:12	07:18:34	08:03:14	1:26	7.36%
Madagascar	Antananarivo	06:35:50	07:18:45	08:05:15	1:29	8.69%
Madagascar	Antsirabe	06:35:14	07:20:04	08:08:48	1:34	10.12%
South Africa	Pretoria	06:20:46 (sunrise)	06:23:46	07:14:53	0:54	18.19%
South Africa	Johannesburg	06:21:39 (sunrise)	06:24:28	07:16:11	0:55	18.91%
Mozambique	Maputo	06:03:25 (sunrise)	06:24:42	07:18:40	1:15	19.48%
Eswatini	Mbabane	06:09:22 (sunrise)	06:25:02	07:18:43	1:09	19.82%
Réunion	Saint-Denis	07:40:44	08:27:40	09:18:31	1:38	9.39%
Mauritius	Port Louis	07:43:15	08:28:05	09:16:23	1:33	7.67%
Réunion	Saint-Pierre	07:40:41	08:28:32	09:20:28	1:40	9.99%
Lesotho	Teyateyaneng	06:25:04 (sunrise)	06:29:11	07:24:44	1:00	23.73%
Lesotho	Maseru	06:26:12 (sunrise)	06:29:26	07:25:02	0:59	23.94%
Lesotho	Mafeteng	06:27:34 (sunrise)	06:30:15	07:26:19	0:59	24.71%
South Africa	Durban	06:12:33 (sunrise)	06:30:54	07:29:08	1:17	25.59%
Botswana	Gaborone	06:29:05 (sunrise)	06:31:27	07:10:02	0:41	14.65%
South Africa	Gqeberha	06:37:28 (sunrise)	06:40:04	07:36:37	0:59	30.72%
South Africa	Marion Island	07:01:28 (sunrise)	08:06:39	09:18:47	2:17	46.70%
South Africa	Cape Town	07:06:08 (sunrise)	07:08:43	07:32:20	0:26	13.46%
French Southern and Antarctic Lands	Île de la Possession	09:06:23	10:16:01	11:31:16	2:25	41.03%
French Southern and Antarctic Lands	Île Amsterdam	09:33:25	10:29:00	11:26:19	1:53	10.29%
French Southern and Antarctic Lands	Port-aux-Français	09:32:40	10:41:28	11:52:49	2:20	28.00%
Antarctica	Mawson Station	10:55:10	12:02:24	13:11:05	2:16	40.68%
Antarctica	Casey Station	13:49:07	14:37:00	15:23:56	1:35	10.87%

== Eclipse details ==
Shown below are two tables displaying details about this particular solar eclipse. The first table outlines times at which the Moon's penumbra or umbra attains the specific parameter, and the second table describes various other parameters pertaining to this eclipse.

August 31, 1989 Solar Eclipse Times
Event	Time (UTC)
First Penumbral External Contact	1989 August 31 at 03:34:34.1 UTC
Greatest Eclipse	1989 August 31 at 05:31:46.6 UTC
Ecliptic Conjunction	1989 August 31 at 05:45:27.9 UTC
Equatorial Conjunction	1989 August 31 at 06:44:00.9 UTC
Last Penumbral External Contact	1989 August 31 at 07:28:34.9 UTC

August 31, 1989 Solar Eclipse Parameters
Parameter	Value
Eclipse Magnitude	0.63443
Eclipse Obscuration	0.53492
Gamma	−1.19279
Sun Right Ascension	10h37m52.8s
Sun Declination	+08°38'48.2"
Sun Semi-Diameter	15'50.7"
Sun Equatorial Horizontal Parallax	08.7"
Moon Right Ascension	10h35m50.9s
Moon Declination	+07°40'48.2"
Moon Semi-Diameter	14'58.4"
Moon Equatorial Horizontal Parallax	0°54'57.0"
ΔT	56.7 s

== Eclipse season ==
This eclipse is part of an eclipse season, a period, roughly every six months, when eclipses occur. Only two (or occasionally three) eclipse seasons occur each year, and each season lasts about 35 days and repeats just short of six months (173 days) later; thus two full eclipse seasons always occur each year. Either two or three eclipses happen each eclipse season. In the sequence below, each eclipse is separated by a fortnight.

Eclipse season of August 1989
August 17 Ascending node (full moon)	August 31 Descending node (new moon)
Total lunar eclipse Lunar Saros 128	Partial solar eclipse Solar Saros 154

== Related eclipses ==
=== Eclipses in 1989 ===
- A total lunar eclipse on February 20.
- A partial solar eclipse on March 7.
- A total lunar eclipse on August 17.
- A partial solar eclipse on August 31.

=== Metonic ===
- Preceded by: Solar eclipse of November 12, 1985

=== Tzolkinex ===
- Preceded by: Solar eclipse of July 20, 1982
- Followed by: Solar eclipse of October 12, 1996

=== Half-Saros ===
- Preceded by: Lunar eclipse of August 26, 1980
- Followed by: Lunar eclipse of September 6, 1998

=== Tritos ===
- Preceded by: Solar eclipse of October 2, 1978
- Followed by: Solar eclipse of July 31, 2000

=== Solar Saros 154 ===
- Preceded by: Solar eclipse of August 20, 1971
- Followed by: Solar eclipse of September 11, 2007

=== Inex ===
- Preceded by: Solar eclipse of September 20, 1960
- Followed by: Solar eclipse of August 11, 2018

=== Triad ===
- Preceded by: Solar eclipse of October 31, 1902
- Followed by: Solar eclipse of July 1, 2076

=== Solar eclipses of 1986–1989 ===
This eclipse is a member of a semester series. An eclipse in a semester series of solar eclipses repeats approximately every 177 days and 4 hours (a semester) at alternating nodes of the Moon's orbit.

Solar eclipse series sets from 1986 to 1989
Ascending node			Descending node		
Saros	Map	Gamma	Saros	Map	Gamma
119	April 9, 1986 Partial	−1.0822	124	October 3, 1986 Hybrid	0.9931
129	March 29, 1987 Hybrid	−0.3053	134	September 23, 1987 Annular	0.2787
139	March 18, 1988 Total	0.4188	144	September 11, 1988 Annular	−0.4681
149	March 7, 1989 Partial	1.0981	154	August 31, 1989 Partial	−1.1928

=== Saros 154 ===
This eclipse is a part of Saros series 154, repeating every 18 years, 11 days, and containing 71 events. The series started with a partial solar eclipse on July 19, 1917. It contains annular eclipses from October 3, 2043, through March 27, 2332; hybrid eclipses from April 7, 2350 through April 29, 2386; and total eclipses from May 9, 2404 through May 29, 3035. The series ends at member 71 as a partial eclipse on August 25, 3179. Its eclipses are tabulated in three columns; every third eclipse in the same column is one exeligmos apart, so they all cast shadows over approximately the same parts of the Earth.

The longest duration of annularity will be produced by member 9 at 3 minutes, 41 seconds on October 13, 2061, and the longest duration of totality will be produced by member 35 at 4 minutes, 50 seconds on July 25, 2530. All eclipses in this series occur at the Moon’s descending node of orbit.

Series members 1–16 occur between 1917 and 2200:
1	2	3
July 19, 1917	July 30, 1935	August 9, 1953
4	5	6
August 20, 1971	August 31, 1989	September 11, 2007
7	8	9
September 21, 2025	October 3, 2043	October 13, 2061
10	11	12
October 24, 2079	November 4, 2097	November 16, 2115
13	14	15
November 26, 2133	December 8, 2151	December 18, 2169
16
December 29, 2187

=== Metonic series ===
The metonic series repeats eclipses every 19 years (6939.69 days), lasting about 5 cycles. Eclipses occur in nearly the same calendar date. In addition, the octon subseries repeats 1/5 of that or every 3.8 years (1387.94 days). All eclipses in this table occur at the Moon's descending node.

22 eclipse events between April 8, 1902 and August 31, 1989
April 7–8	January 24–25	November 12	August 31–September 1	June 19–20
108	110	112	114	116
April 8, 1902			August 31, 1913	June 19, 1917
118	120	122	124	126
April 8, 1921	January 24, 1925	November 12, 1928	August 31, 1932	June 19, 1936
128	130	132	134	136
April 7, 1940	January 25, 1944	November 12, 1947	September 1, 1951	June 20, 1955
138	140	142	144	146
April 8, 1959	January 25, 1963	November 12, 1966	August 31, 1970	June 20, 1974
148	150	152	154	
April 7, 1978	January 25, 1982	November 12, 1985	August 31, 1989	

=== Tritos series ===
This eclipse is a part of a tritos cycle, repeating at alternating nodes every 135 synodic months (≈ 3986.63 days, or 11 years minus 1 month). Their appearance and longitude are irregular due to a lack of synchronization with the anomalistic month (period of perigee), but groupings of 3 tritos cycles (≈ 33 years minus 3 months) come close (≈ 434.044 anomalistic months), so eclipses are similar in these groupings.

The partial solar eclipse on October 24, 2098 (part of Saros 164) is also a part of this series but is not included in the table below.

Series members between 1801 and 2011
February 11, 1804 (Saros 137)	January 10, 1815 (Saros 138)	December 9, 1825 (Saros 139)	November 9, 1836 (Saros 140)	October 9, 1847 (Saros 141)
September 7, 1858 (Saros 142)	August 7, 1869 (Saros 143)	July 7, 1880 (Saros 144)	June 6, 1891 (Saros 145)	May 7, 1902 (Saros 146)
April 6, 1913 (Saros 147)	March 5, 1924 (Saros 148)	February 3, 1935 (Saros 149)	January 3, 1946 (Saros 150)	December 2, 1956 (Saros 151)
November 2, 1967 (Saros 152)	October 2, 1978 (Saros 153)	August 31, 1989 (Saros 154)	July 31, 2000 (Saros 155)	July 1, 2011 (Saros 156)

=== Inex series ===
This eclipse is a part of the long period inex cycle, repeating at alternating nodes, every 358 synodic months (≈ 10,571.95 days, or 29 years minus 20 days). Their appearance and longitude are irregular due to a lack of synchronization with the anomalistic month (period of perigee). However, groupings of 3 inex cycles (≈ 87 years minus 2 months) comes close (≈ 1,151.02 anomalistic months), so eclipses are similar in these groupings.

Series members between 1801 and 2200
December 30, 1815 (Saros 148)	December 9, 1844 (Saros 149)	November 20, 1873 (Saros 150)
October 31, 1902 (Saros 151)	October 11, 1931 (Saros 152)	September 20, 1960 (Saros 153)
August 31, 1989 (Saros 154)	August 11, 2018 (Saros 155)	July 22, 2047 (Saros 156)
July 1, 2076 (Saros 157)	June 12, 2105 (Saros 158)	May 23, 2134 (Saros 159)
	April 12, 2192 (Saros 161)	
