= August 1980 lunar eclipse =

Penumbral lunar eclipse August 26, 1980

- Penumbral eclipse
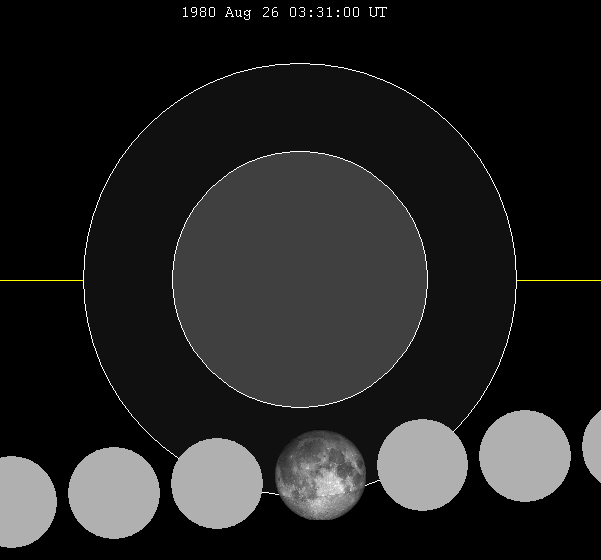
- The Moon's hourly motion shown right to left
- Date: August 26, 1980
- Gamma: −1.1608
- Magnitude: −0.2531
- Saros cycle: 147 (7 of 71)
- Penumbral: 214 minutes, 21 seconds
Contacts (UTC)
- P1: 1:43:21
- Greatest: 3:30:29
- P4: 5:17:42

A penumbral lunar eclipse occurred at the Moon's descending node of orbit on Tuesday, August 26, 1980, with an umbral magnitude of −0.2531. A lunar eclipse occurs when the Moon moves into the Earth's shadow, causing the Moon to be darkened. A penumbral lunar eclipse occurs when part or all of the Moon's near side passes into the Earth's penumbra. Unlike a solar eclipse, which can only be viewed from a relatively small area of the world, a lunar eclipse may be viewed from anywhere on the night side of Earth. Occurring about 1.7 days before perigee (on August 27, 1980, at 20:05 UTC), the Moon's apparent diameter was larger.

== Visibility ==
The eclipse was completely visible over central and eastern North America, South America, and west Africa, seen rising over western North America and the central Pacific Ocean and setting over central and eastern Africa, Europe, and the Middle East.

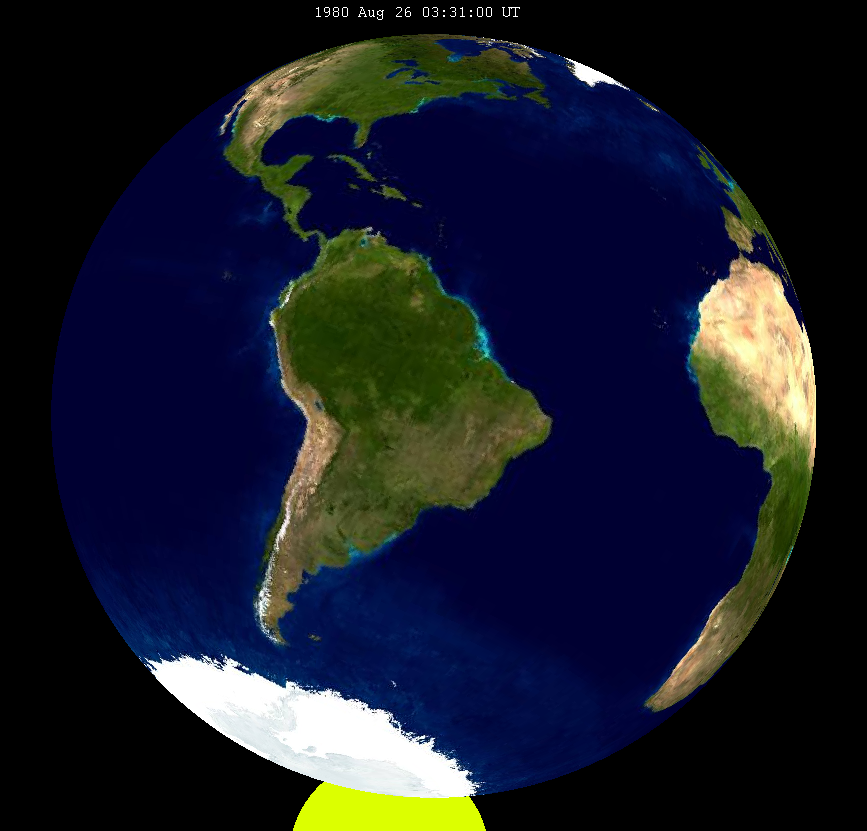
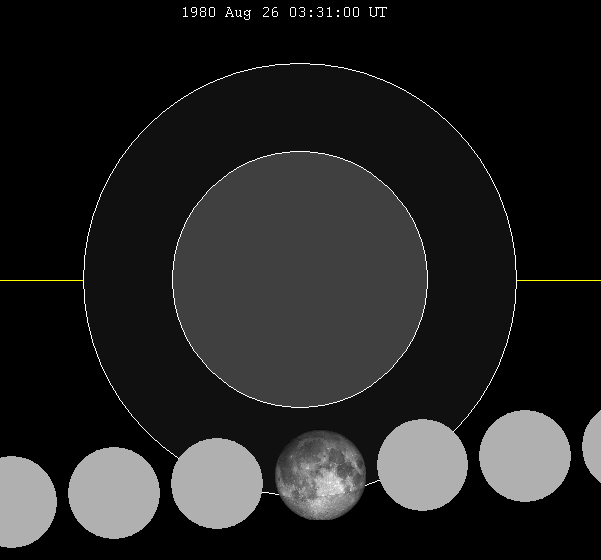

== Eclipse details ==
Shown below is a table displaying details about this particular lunar eclipse. It describes various parameters pertaining to this eclipse.

August 26, 1980 Lunar Eclipse Parameters
Parameter	Value
Penumbral Magnitude	0.70891
Umbral Magnitude	−0.25310
Gamma	−1.16082
Sun Right Ascension	10h19m57.4s
Sun Declination	+10°23'14.8"
Sun Semi-Diameter	15'49.7"
Sun Equatorial Horizontal Parallax	08.7"
Moon Right Ascension	22h21m14.5s
Moon Declination	-11°30'44.4"
Moon Semi-Diameter	16'27.2"
Moon Equatorial Horizontal Parallax	1°00'23.3"
ΔT	51.1 s

== Eclipse season ==
This eclipse is part of an eclipse season, a period, roughly every six months, when eclipses occur. Only two (or occasionally three) eclipse seasons occur each year, and each season lasts about 35 days and repeats just short of six months (173 days) later; thus two full eclipse seasons always occur each year. Either two or three eclipses happen each eclipse season. In the sequence below, each eclipse is separated by a fortnight. The first and last eclipse in this sequence is separated by one synodic month.

Eclipse season of July–August 1980
July 27 Descending node (full moon)	August 10 Ascending node (new moon)	August 26 Descending node (full moon)
Penumbral lunar eclipse Lunar Saros 109	Annular solar eclipse Solar Saros 135	Penumbral lunar eclipse Lunar Saros 147

== Related eclipses ==
=== Eclipses in 1980 ===
- A total solar eclipse on February 16.
- A penumbral lunar eclipse on March 1.
- A penumbral lunar eclipse on July 27.
- An annular solar eclipse on August 10.
- A penumbral lunar eclipse on August 26.

=== Metonic ===
- Preceded by: Lunar eclipse of November 6, 1976
- Followed by: Lunar eclipse of June 13, 1984

=== Tzolkinex ===
- Preceded by: Lunar eclipse of July 15, 1973
- Followed by: Lunar eclipse of October 7, 1987

=== Half-Saros ===
- Preceded by: Solar eclipse of August 20, 1971
- Followed by: Solar eclipse of August 31, 1989

=== Tritos ===
- Preceded by: Lunar eclipse of September 25, 1969
- Followed by: Lunar eclipse of July 26, 1991

=== Lunar Saros 147 ===
- Preceded by: Lunar eclipse of August 15, 1962
- Followed by: Lunar eclipse of September 6, 1998

=== Inex ===
- Preceded by: Lunar eclipse of September 15, 1951
- Followed by: Lunar eclipse of August 6, 2009

=== Triad ===
- Preceded by: Lunar eclipse of October 25, 1893
- Followed by: Lunar eclipse of June 27, 2067

=== Lunar eclipses of 1977–1980 ===
This eclipse is a member of a semester series. An eclipse in a semester series of lunar eclipses repeats approximately every 177 days and 4 hours (a semester) at alternating nodes of the Moon's orbit.

The penumbral lunar eclipse on July 27, 1980 occurs in the next lunar year eclipse set.

Lunar eclipse series sets from 1977 to 1980
Ascending node				Descending node			
Saros	Date Viewing	Type Chart	Gamma	Saros	Date Viewing	Type Chart	Gamma
112	1977 Apr 04	Partial	−0.9148	117	1977 Sep 27	Penumbral	1.0768
122	1978 Mar 24	Total	−0.2140	127	1978 Sep 16	Total	0.2951
132	1979 Mar 13	Partial	0.5254	137	1979 Sep 06	Total	−0.4305
142	1980 Mar 01	Penumbral	1.2270	147	1980 Aug 26	Penumbral	−1.1608

=== Saros 147 ===
This eclipse is a part of Saros series 147, repeating every 18 years, 11 days, and containing 70 events. The series started with a penumbral lunar eclipse on July 2, 1890. It contains partial eclipses from September 28, 2034 through May 27, 2431; total eclipses from June 6, 2449 through October 5, 2647; and a second set of partial eclipses from October 16, 2665 through May 1, 2990. The series ends at member 70 as a penumbral eclipse on July 28, 3145.

The longest duration of totality will be produced by member 37 at 105 minutes, 18 seconds on August 1, 2539. All eclipses in this series occur at the Moon’s descending node of orbit.

Greatest	First			
The greatest eclipse of the series will occur on 2539 Aug 01, lasting 105 minutes, 18 seconds.	Penumbral	Partial	Total	Central
The greatest eclipse of the series will occur on 2539 Aug 01, lasting 105 minutes, 18 seconds.	1890 Jul 02	2034 Sep 28	2449 Jun 06	2485 Jun 28
The greatest eclipse of the series will occur on 2539 Aug 01, lasting 105 minutes, 18 seconds.	Last			
The greatest eclipse of the series will occur on 2539 Aug 01, lasting 105 minutes, 18 seconds.	Central	Total	Partial	Penumbral
The greatest eclipse of the series will occur on 2539 Aug 01, lasting 105 minutes, 18 seconds.	2593 Sep 02	2647 Oct 05	2990 May 01	3134 Jul 28

Eclipses are tabulated in three columns; every third eclipse in the same column is one exeligmos apart, so they all cast shadows over approximately the same parts of the Earth.

Series members 1–18 occur between 1890 and 2200:
1	2	3
1890 Jul 02	1908 Jul 13	1926 Jul 25
4	5	6
1944 Aug 04	1962 Aug 15	1980 Aug 26
7	8	9
1998 Sep 06	2016 Sep 16	2034 Sep 28
10	11	12
2052 Oct 08	2070 Oct 19	2088 Oct 30
13	14	15
2106 Nov 11	2124 Nov 21	2142 Dec 03
16	17	18
2160 Dec 13	2178 Dec 24	2197 Jan 04

=== Tritos series ===
This eclipse is a part of a tritos cycle, repeating at alternating nodes every 135 synodic months (≈ 3986.63 days, or 11 years minus 1 month). Their appearance and longitude are irregular due to a lack of synchronization with the anomalistic month (period of perigee), but groupings of 3 tritos cycles (≈ 33 years minus 3 months) come close (≈ 434.044 anomalistic months), so eclipses are similar in these groupings.

Series members between 1801 and 2078
1806 Jan 05 (Saros 131)	1816 Dec 04 (Saros 132)	1827 Nov 03 (Saros 133)	1838 Oct 03 (Saros 134)	1849 Sep 02 (Saros 135)
1860 Aug 01 (Saros 136)	1871 Jul 02 (Saros 137)	1882 Jun 01 (Saros 138)	1893 Apr 30 (Saros 139)	1904 Mar 31 (Saros 140)
1915 Mar 01 (Saros 141)	1926 Jan 28 (Saros 142)	1936 Dec 28 (Saros 143)	1947 Nov 28 (Saros 144)	1958 Oct 27 (Saros 145)
1969 Sep 25 (Saros 146)	1980 Aug 26 (Saros 147)	1991 Jul 26 (Saros 148)	2002 Jun 24 (Saros 149)	2013 May 25 (Saros 150)
2078 Nov 19 (Saros 156)

=== Inex series ===
This eclipse is a part of the long period inex cycle, repeating at alternating nodes, every 358 synodic months (≈ 10,571.95 days, or 29 years minus 20 days). Their appearance and longitude are irregular due to a lack of synchronization with the anomalistic month (period of perigee). However, groupings of 3 inex cycles (≈ 87 years minus 2 months) comes close (≈ 1,151.02 anomalistic months), so eclipses are similar in these groupings.

Series members between 1801 and 2154
1806 Dec 25 (Saros 141)	1835 Dec 05 (Saros 142)	1864 Nov 13 (Saros 143)
1893 Oct 25 (Saros 144)	1922 Oct 06 (Saros 145)	1951 Sep 15 (Saros 146)
1980 Aug 26 (Saros 147)	2009 Aug 06 (Saros 148)	2038 Jul 16 (Saros 149)
2067 Jun 27 (Saros 150)	2096 Jun 06 (Saros 151)	2125 May 17 (Saros 152)
2154 Apr 28 (Saros 153)

=== Half-Saros cycle ===
A lunar eclipse will be preceded and followed by solar eclipses by 9 years and 5.5 days (a half saros). This lunar eclipse is related to two partial solar eclipses of Solar Saros 154.

August 20, 1971	August 31, 1989

== See also ==
- List of lunar eclipses
- List of 20th-century lunar eclipses
