= August 2045 lunar eclipse =

Astronomical event

- Penumbral eclipse
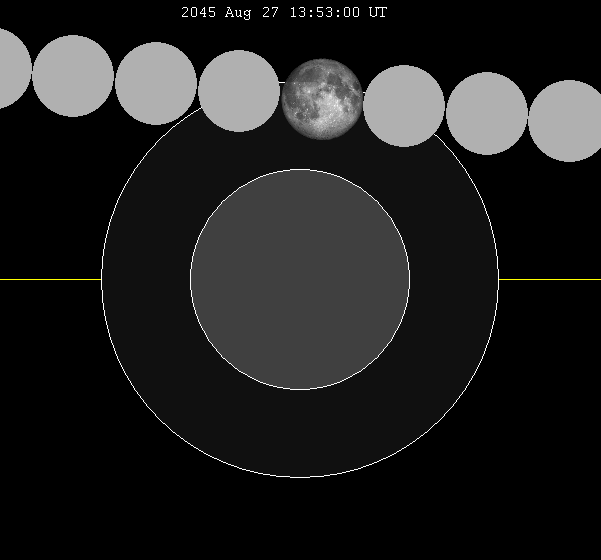
- The Moon's hourly motion shown right to left
- Date: August 27, 2045
- Gamma: 1.2060
- Magnitude: −0.3899
- Saros cycle: 148 (5 of 70)
- Penumbral: 241 minutes, 40 seconds
Contacts (UTC)
- P1: 11:52:33
- Greatest: 13:53:21
- P4: 15:54:13

A penumbral lunar eclipse will occur at the Moon’s descending node of orbit on Sunday, August 27, 2045, with an umbral magnitude of −0.3899. A lunar eclipse occurs when the Moon moves into the Earth's shadow, causing the Moon to be darkened. A penumbral lunar eclipse occurs when part or all of the Moon's near side passes into the Earth's penumbra. Unlike a solar eclipse, which can only be viewed from a relatively small area of the world, a lunar eclipse may be viewed from anywhere on the night side of Earth. Occurring about 1.6 days after apogee (on August 26, 2045, at 0:10 UTC), the Moon's apparent diameter will be smaller.

== Visibility ==
The eclipse will be completely visible over east Asia and Australia, seen rising over east Africa and west, central, and south Asia and setting over western North America.

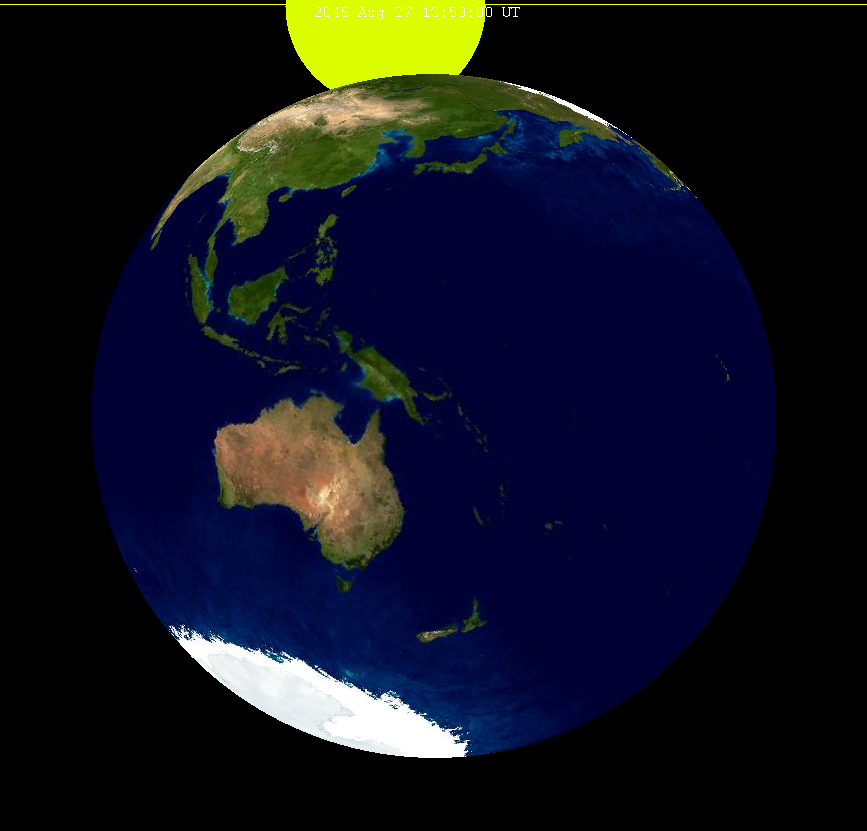
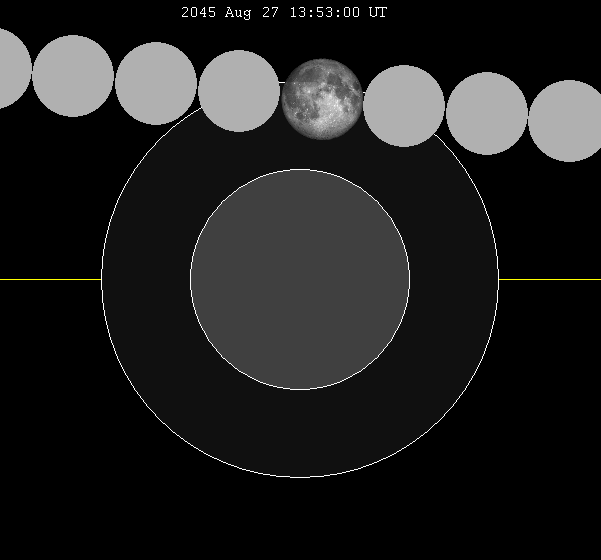

== Eclipse details ==
Shown below is a table displaying details about this particular solar eclipse. It describes various parameters pertaining to this eclipse.

August 27, 2045 Lunar Eclipse Parameters
Parameter	Value
Penumbral Magnitude	0.68449
Umbral Magnitude	−0.38987
Gamma	1.20606
Sun Right Ascension	10h26m15.1s
Sun Declination	+09°46'56.3"
Sun Semi-Diameter	15'49.9"
Sun Equatorial Horizontal Parallax	08.7"
Moon Right Ascension	22h24m15.1s
Moon Declination	-08°48'49.2"
Moon Semi-Diameter	14'44.1"
Moon Equatorial Horizontal Parallax	0°54'04.7"
ΔT	82.4 s

== Eclipse season ==
This eclipse is part of an eclipse season, a period, roughly every six months, when eclipses occur. Only two (or occasionally three) eclipse seasons occur each year, and each season lasts about 35 days and repeats just short of six months (173 days) later; thus two full eclipse seasons always occur each year. Either two or three eclipses happen each eclipse season. In the sequence below, each eclipse is separated by a fortnight.

Eclipse season of August 2045
August 12 Descending node (new moon)	August 27 Ascending node (full moon)
Total solar eclipse Solar Saros 136	Penumbral lunar eclipse Lunar Saros 148

== Related eclipses ==
=== Eclipses in 2045 ===
- An annular solar eclipse on February 16.
- A penumbral lunar eclipse on March 3.
- A total solar eclipse on August 12.
- A penumbral lunar eclipse on August 27.

=== Metonic ===
- Preceded by: Lunar eclipse of November 8, 2041
- Followed by: Lunar eclipse of June 15, 2049

=== Tzolkinex ===
- Preceded by: Lunar eclipse of July 16, 2038
- Followed by: Lunar eclipse of October 8, 2052

=== Half-Saros ===
- Preceded by: Solar eclipse of August 21, 2036
- Followed by: Solar eclipse of September 2, 2054

=== Tritos ===
- Preceded by: Lunar eclipse of September 28, 2034
- Followed by: Lunar eclipse of July 26, 2056

=== Lunar Saros 148 ===
- Preceded by: Lunar eclipse of August 17, 2027
- Followed by: Lunar eclipse of September 7, 2063

=== Inex ===
- Preceded by: Lunar eclipse of September 16, 2016
- Followed by: Lunar eclipse of August 7, 2074

=== Triad ===
- Preceded by: Lunar eclipse of October 27, 1958
- Followed by: Lunar eclipse of June 28, 2132

=== Lunar eclipses of 2042–2045 ===
This eclipse is a member of a semester series. An eclipse in a semester series of lunar eclipses repeats approximately every 177 days and 4 hours (a semester) at alternating nodes of the Moon's orbit.

The penumbral lunar eclipse on October 28, 2042 occurs in the previous lunar year eclipse set.

Lunar eclipse series sets from 2042 to 2045
Descending node				Ascending node			
Saros	Date Viewing	Type Chart	Gamma	Saros	Date Viewing	Type Chart	Gamma
113	2042 Apr 05	Penumbral	1.1080	118	2042 Sep 29	Penumbral	−1.0261
123	2043 Mar 25	Total	0.3849	128	2043 Sep 19	Total	−0.3316
133	2044 Mar 13	Total	−0.3496	138	2044 Sep 07	Total	0.4318
143	2045 Mar 03	Penumbral	−1.0274	148	2045 Aug 27	Penumbral	1.2060

=== Saros 148 ===
This eclipse is a part of Saros series 148, repeating every 18 years, 11 days, and containing 70 events. The series started with a penumbral lunar eclipse on July 15, 1973. It contains partial eclipses from October 10, 2117 through May 5, 2460; total eclipses from May 17, 2478 through September 14, 2676; and a second set of partial eclipses from September 25, 2694 through May 25, 3091. The series ends at member 70 as a penumbral eclipse on August 9, 3217.

The longest duration of totality will be produced by member 37 at 104 minutes, 29 seconds on July 10, 2568. All eclipses in this series occur at the Moon’s ascending node of orbit.

Greatest	First			
The greatest eclipse of the series will occur on 2568 Jul 10, lasting 104 minutes, 29 seconds.	Penumbral	Partial	Total	Central
The greatest eclipse of the series will occur on 2568 Jul 10, lasting 104 minutes, 29 seconds.	1973 Jul 15	2117 Oct 10	2478 May 25	2514 Jun 08
The greatest eclipse of the series will occur on 2568 Jul 10, lasting 104 minutes, 29 seconds.	Last			
The greatest eclipse of the series will occur on 2568 Jul 10, lasting 104 minutes, 29 seconds.	Central	Total	Partial	Penumbral
The greatest eclipse of the series will occur on 2568 Jul 10, lasting 104 minutes, 29 seconds.	2622 Aug 13	2676 Sep 14	3091 May 25	3217 Aug 09

Eclipses are tabulated in three columns; every third eclipse in the same column is one exeligmos apart, so they all cast shadows over approximately the same parts of the Earth.

Series members 1–13 occur between 1973 and 2200:
1	2	3
1973 Jul 15	1991 Jul 26	2009 Aug 06
4	5	6
2027 Aug 17	2045 Aug 27	2063 Sep 07
7	8	9
2081 Sep 18	2099 Sep 29	2117 Oct 10
10	11	12
2135 Oct 22	2153 Nov 01	2171 Nov 12
13
2189 Nov 22

=== Tritos series ===
This eclipse is a part of a tritos cycle, repeating at alternating nodes every 135 synodic months (≈ 3986.63 days, or 11 years minus 1 month). Their appearance and longitude are irregular due to a lack of synchronization with the anomalistic month (period of perigee), but groupings of 3 tritos cycles (≈ 33 years minus 3 months) come close (≈ 434.044 anomalistic months), so eclipses are similar in these groupings.

Series members between 1801 and 2132
1805 Jul 11 (Saros 126)	1816 Jun 10 (Saros 127)	1827 May 11 (Saros 128)	1838 Apr 10 (Saros 129)	1849 Mar 09 (Saros 130)
1860 Feb 07 (Saros 131)	1871 Jan 06 (Saros 132)	1881 Dec 05 (Saros 133)	1892 Nov 04 (Saros 134)	1903 Oct 06 (Saros 135)
1914 Sep 04 (Saros 136)	1925 Aug 04 (Saros 137)	1936 Jul 04 (Saros 138)	1947 Jun 03 (Saros 139)	1958 May 03 (Saros 140)
1969 Apr 02 (Saros 141)	1980 Mar 01 (Saros 142)	1991 Jan 30 (Saros 143)	2001 Dec 30 (Saros 144)	2012 Nov 28 (Saros 145)
2023 Oct 28 (Saros 146)	2034 Sep 28 (Saros 147)	2045 Aug 27 (Saros 148)	2056 Jul 26 (Saros 149)	2067 Jun 27 (Saros 150)
2132 Dec 22 (Saros 156)

=== Inex series ===
This eclipse is a part of the long period inex cycle, repeating at alternating nodes, every 358 synodic months (≈ 10,571.95 days, or 29 years minus 20 days). Their appearance and longitude are irregular due to a lack of synchronization with the anomalistic month (period of perigee). However, groupings of 3 inex cycles (≈ 87 years minus 2 months) comes close (≈ 1,151.02 anomalistic months), so eclipses are similar in these groupings.

Series members between 1801 and 2200
1814 Feb 04 (Saros 140)	1843 Jan 16 (Saros 141)	1871 Dec 26 (Saros 142)
1900 Dec 06 (Saros 143)	1929 Nov 17 (Saros 144)	1958 Oct 27 (Saros 145)
1987 Oct 07 (Saros 146)	2016 Sep 16 (Saros 147)	2045 Aug 27 (Saros 148)
2074 Aug 07 (Saros 149)	2103 Jul 19 (Saros 150)	2132 Jun 28 (Saros 151)
2161 Jun 08 (Saros 152)	2190 May 19 (Saros 153)	

=== Half-Saros cycle ===
A lunar eclipse will be preceded and followed by solar eclipses by 9 years and 5.5 days (a half saros). This lunar eclipse is related to two partial solar eclipses of Solar Saros 155.

August 21, 2036	September 2, 2054

== See also ==
- List of lunar eclipses and List of 21st-century lunar eclipses
