= August 1962 lunar eclipse =

Penumbral lunar eclipse August 15, 1962

- Penumbral eclipse
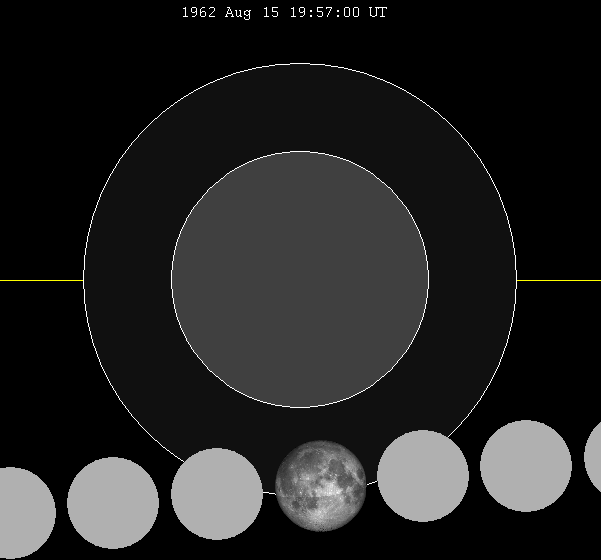
- The Moon's hourly motion shown right to left
- Date: August 15, 1962
- Gamma: −1.2210
- Magnitude: −0.3615
- Saros cycle: 147 (6 of 71)
- Penumbral: 198 minutes, 13 seconds
Contacts (UTC)
- P1: 18:17:52
- Greatest: 19:56:56
- P4: 21:36:05

A penumbral lunar eclipse occurred at the Moon’s descending node of orbit on Wednesday, August 15, 1962, with an umbral magnitude of −0.3615. A lunar eclipse occurs when the Moon moves into the Earth's shadow, causing the Moon to be darkened. A penumbral lunar eclipse occurs when part or all of the Moon's near side passes into the Earth's penumbra. Unlike a solar eclipse, which can only be viewed from a relatively small area of the world, a lunar eclipse may be viewed from anywhere on the night side of Earth. Occurring about 1.6 days before perigee (on August 17, 1962, at 9:20 UTC), the Moon's apparent diameter was larger.

== Visibility ==
The eclipse was completely visible over much of Africa, eastern Europe, most of Asia, western Australia, and Antarctica, seen rising over eastern South America, western Europe, and west Africa and setting over northeast Asia and eastern Australia.

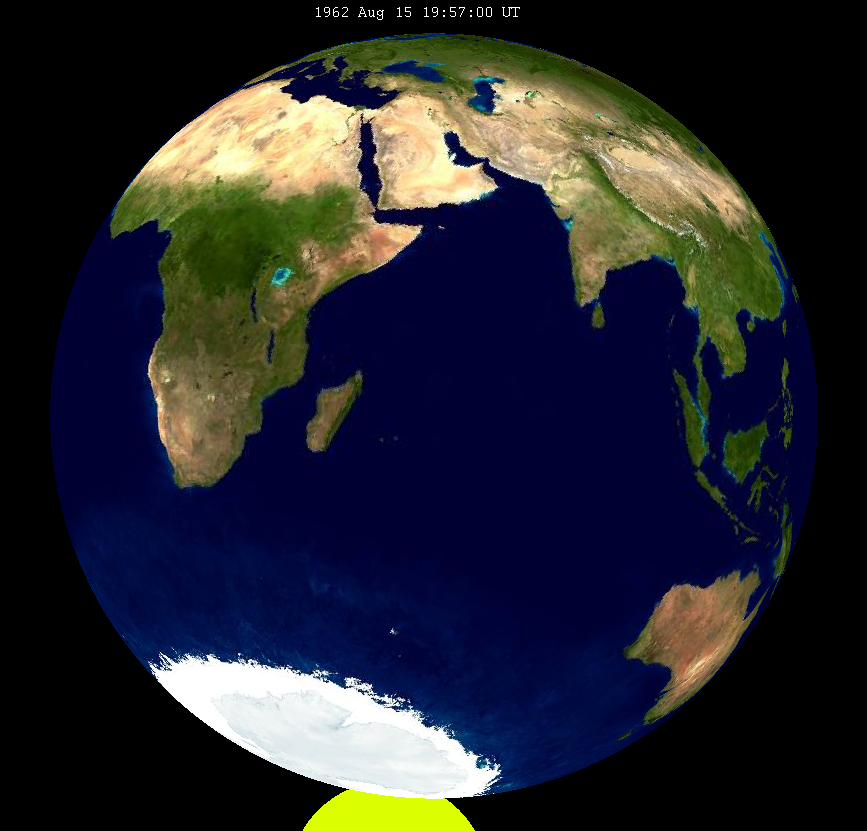
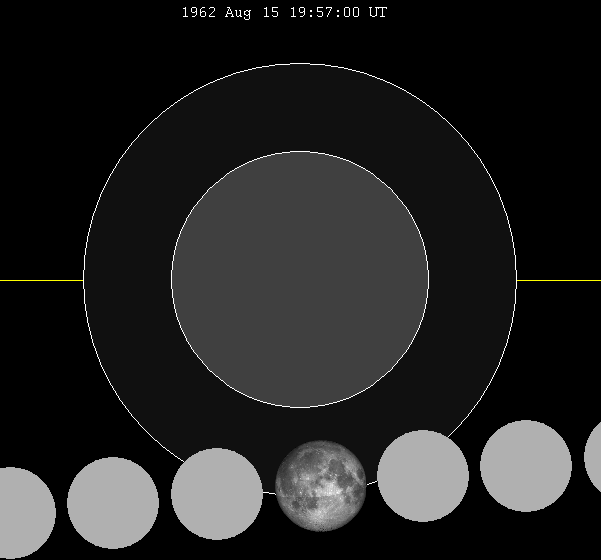

== Eclipse details ==
Shown below is a table displaying details about this particular solar eclipse. It describes various parameters pertaining to this eclipse.

August 15, 1962 Lunar Eclipse Parameters
Parameter	Value
Penumbral Magnitude	0.59632
Umbral Magnitude	−0.36153
Gamma	−1.22104
Sun Right Ascension	09h39m23.3s
Sun Declination	+14°01'05.2"
Sun Semi-Diameter	15'47.7"
Sun Equatorial Horizontal Parallax	08.7"
Moon Right Ascension	21h40m34.8s
Moon Declination	-15°12'55.5"
Moon Semi-Diameter	16'29.4"
Moon Equatorial Horizontal Parallax	1°00'31.1"
ΔT	34.3 s

== Eclipse season ==
This eclipse is part of an eclipse season, a period, roughly every six months, when eclipses occur. Only two (or occasionally three) eclipse seasons occur each year, and each season lasts about 35 days and repeats just short of six months (173 days) later; thus two full eclipse seasons always occur each year. Either two or three eclipses happen each eclipse season. In the sequence below, each eclipse is separated by a fortnight. The first and last eclipse in this sequence is separated by one synodic month.

Eclipse season of July–August 1962
July 17 Descending node (full moon)	July 31 Ascending node (new moon)	August 15 Descending node (full moon)
Penumbral lunar eclipse Lunar Saros 109	Annular solar eclipse Solar Saros 135	Penumbral lunar eclipse Lunar Saros 147

== Related eclipses ==
=== Eclipses in 1962 ===
- A total solar eclipse on February 5.
- A penumbral lunar eclipse on February 19.
- A penumbral lunar eclipse on July 17.
- An annular solar eclipse on July 31.
- A penumbral lunar eclipse on August 15.

=== Metonic ===
- Preceded by: Lunar eclipse of October 27, 1958

=== Tzolkinex ===
- Followed by: Lunar eclipse of September 25, 1969

=== Half-Saros ===
- Preceded by: Solar eclipse of August 9, 1953
- Followed by: Solar eclipse of August 20, 1971

=== Tritos ===
- Preceded by: Lunar eclipse of September 15, 1951
- Followed by: Lunar eclipse of July 15, 1973

=== Lunar Saros 147 ===
- Preceded by: Lunar eclipse of August 4, 1944
- Followed by: Lunar eclipse of August 26, 1980

=== Inex ===
- Preceded by: Lunar eclipse of September 4, 1933
- Followed by: Lunar eclipse of July 26, 1991

=== Triad ===
- Preceded by: Lunar eclipse of October 14, 1875
- Followed by: Lunar eclipse of June 15, 2049

=== Lunar eclipses of 1962–1965 ===
This eclipse is a member of a semester series. An eclipse in a semester series of lunar eclipses repeats approximately every 177 days and 4 hours (a semester) at alternating nodes of the Moon's orbit.

The lunar eclipses on May 3, 1958 (partial) and October 28, 1958 (penumbral) occur in the previous lunar year eclipse set, and the penumbral lunar eclipse on July 17, 1962 occurs in the next lunar year eclipse set.

Lunar eclipse series sets from 1958 to 1962
Ascending node				Descending node			
Saros	Date Viewing	Type Chart	Gamma	Saros	Date Viewing	Type Chart	Gamma
102	1958 Apr 04	Penumbral	−1.5381				
112	1959 Mar 24	Partial	−0.8757	117	1959 Sep 17	Penumbral	1.0296
122	1960 Mar 13	Total	−0.1799	127	1960 Sep 05	Total	0.2422
132	1961 Mar 02	Partial	0.5541	137	1961 Aug 26	Partial	−0.4895
142	1962 Feb 19	Penumbral	1.2512	147	1962 Aug 15	Penumbral	−1.2210

=== Saros 147 ===
This eclipse is a part of Saros series 147, repeating every 18 years, 11 days, and containing 70 events. The series started with a penumbral lunar eclipse on July 2, 1890. It contains partial eclipses from September 28, 2034 through May 27, 2431; total eclipses from June 6, 2449 through October 5, 2647; and a second set of partial eclipses from October 16, 2665 through May 1, 2990. The series ends at member 70 as a penumbral eclipse on July 28, 3145.

The longest duration of totality will be produced by member 37 at 105 minutes, 18 seconds on August 1, 2539. All eclipses in this series occur at the Moon’s descending node of orbit.

Greatest	First			
The greatest eclipse of the series will occur on 2539 Aug 01, lasting 105 minutes, 18 seconds.	Penumbral	Partial	Total	Central
The greatest eclipse of the series will occur on 2539 Aug 01, lasting 105 minutes, 18 seconds.	1890 Jul 02	2034 Sep 28	2449 Jun 06	2485 Jun 28
The greatest eclipse of the series will occur on 2539 Aug 01, lasting 105 minutes, 18 seconds.	Last			
The greatest eclipse of the series will occur on 2539 Aug 01, lasting 105 minutes, 18 seconds.	Central	Total	Partial	Penumbral
The greatest eclipse of the series will occur on 2539 Aug 01, lasting 105 minutes, 18 seconds.	2593 Sep 02	2647 Oct 05	2990 May 01	3134 Jul 28

Eclipses are tabulated in three columns; every third eclipse in the same column is one exeligmos apart, so they all cast shadows over approximately the same parts of the Earth.

Series members 1–18 occur between 1890 and 2200:
1	2	3
1890 Jul 02	1908 Jul 13	1926 Jul 25
4	5	6
1944 Aug 04	1962 Aug 15	1980 Aug 26
7	8	9
1998 Sep 06	2016 Sep 16	2034 Sep 28
10	11	12
2052 Oct 08	2070 Oct 19	2088 Oct 30
13	14	15
2106 Nov 11	2124 Nov 21	2142 Dec 03
16	17	18
2160 Dec 13	2178 Dec 24	2197 Jan 04

=== Tritos series ===
This eclipse is a part of a tritos cycle, repeating at alternating nodes every 135 synodic months (≈ 3986.63 days, or 11 years minus 1 month). Their appearance and longitude are irregular due to a lack of synchronization with the anomalistic month (period of perigee), but groupings of 3 tritos cycles (≈ 33 years minus 3 months) come close (≈ 434.044 anomalistic months), so eclipses are similar in these groupings.

Series members between 1801 and 2060
1809 Oct 23 (Saros 133)	1820 Sep 22 (Saros 134)	1831 Aug 23 (Saros 135)	1842 Jul 22 (Saros 136)	1853 Jun 21 (Saros 137)
1864 May 21 (Saros 138)	1875 Apr 20 (Saros 139)	1886 Mar 20 (Saros 140)	1897 Feb 17 (Saros 141)	1908 Jan 18 (Saros 142)
1918 Dec 17 (Saros 143)	1929 Nov 17 (Saros 144)	1940 Oct 16 (Saros 145)	1951 Sep 15 (Saros 146)	1962 Aug 15 (Saros 147)
1973 Jul 15 (Saros 148)	1984 Jun 13 (Saros 149)			
			2060 Nov 08 (Saros 156)	

=== Inex series ===
This eclipse is a part of the long period inex cycle, repeating at alternating nodes, every 358 synodic months (≈ 10,571.95 days, or 29 years minus 20 days). Their appearance and longitude are irregular due to a lack of synchronization with the anomalistic month (period of perigee). However, groupings of 3 inex cycles (≈ 87 years minus 2 months) comes close (≈ 1,151.02 anomalistic months), so eclipses are similar in these groupings.

Series members between 1801 and 2200
1817 Nov 23 (Saros 142)	1846 Nov 03 (Saros 143)	1875 Oct 14 (Saros 144)
1904 Sep 24 (Saros 145)	1933 Sep 04 (Saros 146)	1962 Aug 15 (Saros 147)
1991 Jul 26 (Saros 148)	2020 Jul 05 (Saros 149)	2049 Jun 15 (Saros 150)
	2107 May 07 (Saros 152)	2136 Apr 16 (Saros 153)
	2194 Mar 07 (Saros 155)	

=== Half-Saros cycle ===
A lunar eclipse will be preceded and followed by solar eclipses by 9 years and 5.5 days (a half saros). This lunar eclipse is related to two total solar eclipses of Solar Saros 154.

August 9, 1953	August 20, 1971

== See also ==
- List of lunar eclipses
- List of 20th-century lunar eclipses
