= September 2034 lunar eclipse =

Astronomical event

- Partial eclipse
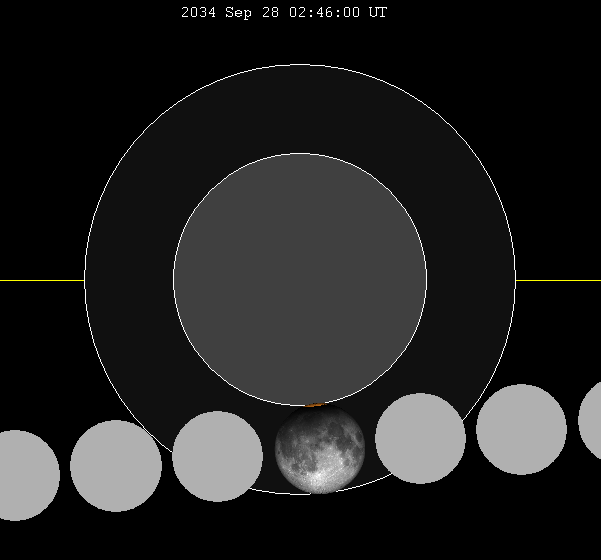
- The Moon's hourly motion shown right to left
- Date: September 28, 2034
- Gamma: −1.0110
- Magnitude: 0.0155
- Saros cycle: 147 (10 of 71)
- Partiality: 26 minutes, 42 seconds
- Penumbral: 248 minutes, 41 seconds
Contacts (UTC)
- P1: 0:43:16
- U1: 2:34:16
- Greatest: 2:47:37
- U4: 3:00:58
- P4: 4:51:58

A partial lunar eclipse will occur at the Moon's descending node of orbit on Thursday, September 28, 2034, with an umbral magnitude of 0.0155. A lunar eclipse occurs when the Moon moves into the Earth's shadow, causing the Moon to be darkened. A partial lunar eclipse occurs when one part of the Moon is in the Earth's umbra, while the other part is in the Earth's penumbra. Unlike a solar eclipse, which can only be viewed from a relatively small area of the world, a lunar eclipse may be viewed from anywhere on the night side of Earth. Occurring about 1.9 days before perigee (on September 30, 2034, at 0:15 UTC), the Moon's apparent diameter will be larger.

This will the second-shortest partial lunar eclipse in the 21st century, lasting 26 minutes and 42 seconds. On February 13, 2082, a slightly shorter partial eclipse will occur, lasting 25 minutes and 30 seconds.

== Visibility ==
The eclipse will be completely visible over eastern North America, South America, west Africa, and western Europe, seen rising over western North America and setting over east Africa and eastern Europe.

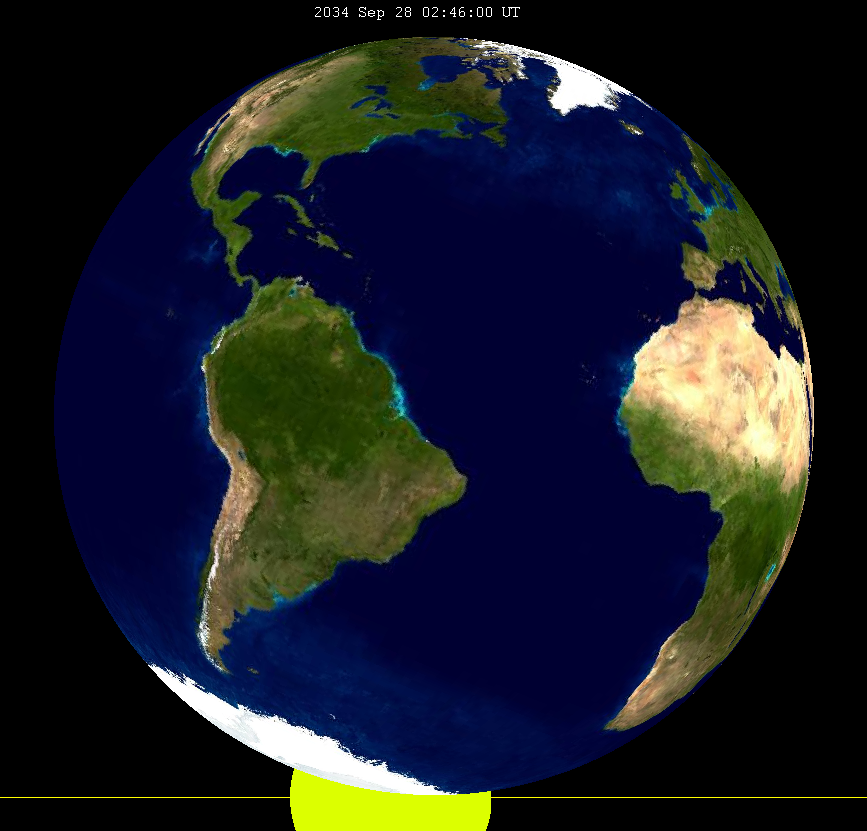
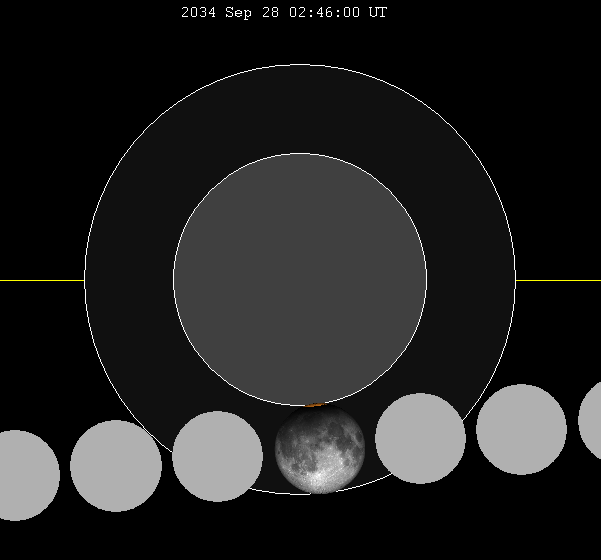

== Eclipse details ==
Shown below is a table displaying details about this particular lunar eclipse. It describes various parameters pertaining to this eclipse.

September 28, 2034 Lunar Eclipse Parameters
Parameter	Value
Penumbral Magnitude	0.99223
Umbral Magnitude	0.01554
Gamma	−1.01103
Sun Right Ascension	12h18m35.8s
Sun Declination	-02°00'43.0"
Sun Semi-Diameter	15'57.6"
Sun Equatorial Horizontal Parallax	08.8"
Moon Right Ascension	00h19m50.0s
Moon Declination	+01°02'59.4"
Moon Semi-Diameter	16'20.4"
Moon Equatorial Horizontal Parallax	0°59'58.2"
ΔT	76.3 s

== Eclipse season ==
This eclipse is part of an eclipse season, a period, roughly every six months, when eclipses occur. Only two (or occasionally three) eclipse seasons occur each year, and each season lasts about 35 days and repeats just short of six months (173 days) later; thus two full eclipse seasons always occur each year. Either two or three eclipses happen each eclipse season. In the sequence below, each eclipse is separated by a fortnight.

Eclipse season of September 2034
September 12 Ascending node (new moon)	September 28 Descending node (full moon)
Annular solar eclipse Solar Saros 135	Partial lunar eclipse Lunar Saros 147

== Related eclipses ==
=== Eclipses in 2034 ===
- A total solar eclipse on March 20.
- A penumbral lunar eclipse on April 3.
- An annular solar eclipse on September 12.
- A partial lunar eclipse on September 28.

=== Metonic ===
- Preceded by: Lunar eclipse of December 9, 2030
- Followed by: Lunar eclipse of July 16, 2038

=== Tzolkinex ===
- Preceded by: Lunar eclipse of August 17, 2027
- Followed by: Lunar eclipse of November 8, 2041

=== Half-Saros ===
- Preceded by: Solar eclipse of September 21, 2025
- Followed by: Solar eclipse of October 3, 2043

=== Tritos ===
- Preceded by: Lunar eclipse of October 28, 2023
- Followed by: Lunar eclipse of August 27, 2045

=== Lunar Saros 147 ===
- Preceded by: Lunar eclipse of September 16, 2016
- Followed by: Lunar eclipse of October 8, 2052

=== Inex ===
- Preceded by: Lunar eclipse of October 17, 2005
- Followed by: Lunar eclipse of September 7, 2063

=== Triad ===
- Preceded by: Lunar eclipse of November 28, 1947
- Followed by: Lunar eclipse of July 30, 2121

=== Lunar eclipses of 2031–2034 ===
This eclipse is a member of a semester series. An eclipse in a semester series of lunar eclipses repeats approximately every 177 days and 4 hours (a semester) at alternating nodes of the Moon's orbit.

The penumbral lunar eclipse on June 5, 2031 occurs in the previous lunar year eclipse set.

Lunar eclipse series sets from 2031 to 2034
Ascending node				Descending node			
Saros	Date Viewing	Type Chart	Gamma	Saros	Date Viewing	Type Chart	Gamma
112	2031 May 07	Penumbral	−1.0694	117	2031 Oct 30	Penumbral	1.1774
122	2032 Apr 25	Total	−0.3558	127	2032 Oct 18	Total	0.4169
132	2033 Apr 14	Total	0.3954	137	2033 Oct 08	Total	−0.2889
142	2034 Apr 03	Penumbral	1.1144	147	2034 Sep 28	Partial	−1.0110

=== Saros 147 ===
This eclipse is a part of Saros series 147, repeating every 18 years, 11 days, and containing 70 events. The series started with a penumbral lunar eclipse on July 2, 1890. It contains partial eclipses from September 28, 2034 through May 27, 2431; total eclipses from June 6, 2449 through October 5, 2647; and a second set of partial eclipses from October 16, 2665 through May 1, 2990. The series ends at member 70 as a penumbral eclipse on July 28, 3145.

The longest duration of totality will be produced by member 37 at 105 minutes, 18 seconds on August 1, 2539. All eclipses in this series occur at the Moon’s descending node of orbit.

Greatest	First			
The greatest eclipse of the series will occur on 2539 Aug 01, lasting 105 minutes, 18 seconds.	Penumbral	Partial	Total	Central
The greatest eclipse of the series will occur on 2539 Aug 01, lasting 105 minutes, 18 seconds.	1890 Jul 02	2034 Sep 28	2449 Jun 06	2485 Jun 28
The greatest eclipse of the series will occur on 2539 Aug 01, lasting 105 minutes, 18 seconds.	Last			
The greatest eclipse of the series will occur on 2539 Aug 01, lasting 105 minutes, 18 seconds.	Central	Total	Partial	Penumbral
The greatest eclipse of the series will occur on 2539 Aug 01, lasting 105 minutes, 18 seconds.	2593 Sep 02	2647 Oct 05	2990 May 01	3134 Jul 28

Eclipses are tabulated in three columns; every third eclipse in the same column is one exeligmos apart, so they all cast shadows over approximately the same parts of the Earth.

Series members 1–18 occur between 1890 and 2200:
1	2	3
1890 Jul 02	1908 Jul 13	1926 Jul 25
4	5	6
1944 Aug 04	1962 Aug 15	1980 Aug 26
7	8	9
1998 Sep 06	2016 Sep 16	2034 Sep 28
10	11	12
2052 Oct 08	2070 Oct 19	2088 Oct 30
13	14	15
2106 Nov 11	2124 Nov 21	2142 Dec 03
16	17	18
2160 Dec 13	2178 Dec 24	2197 Jan 04

=== Tritos series ===
This eclipse is a part of a tritos cycle, repeating at alternating nodes every 135 synodic months (≈ 3986.63 days, or 11 years minus 1 month). Their appearance and longitude are irregular due to a lack of synchronization with the anomalistic month (period of perigee), but groupings of 3 tritos cycles (≈ 33 years minus 3 months) come close (≈ 434.044 anomalistic months), so eclipses are similar in these groupings.

Series members between 1801 and 2132
1805 Jul 11 (Saros 126)	1816 Jun 10 (Saros 127)	1827 May 11 (Saros 128)	1838 Apr 10 (Saros 129)	1849 Mar 09 (Saros 130)
1860 Feb 07 (Saros 131)	1871 Jan 06 (Saros 132)	1881 Dec 05 (Saros 133)	1892 Nov 04 (Saros 134)	1903 Oct 06 (Saros 135)
1914 Sep 04 (Saros 136)	1925 Aug 04 (Saros 137)	1936 Jul 04 (Saros 138)	1947 Jun 03 (Saros 139)	1958 May 03 (Saros 140)
1969 Apr 02 (Saros 141)	1980 Mar 01 (Saros 142)	1991 Jan 30 (Saros 143)	2001 Dec 30 (Saros 144)	2012 Nov 28 (Saros 145)
2023 Oct 28 (Saros 146)	2034 Sep 28 (Saros 147)	2045 Aug 27 (Saros 148)	2056 Jul 26 (Saros 149)	2067 Jun 27 (Saros 150)
2132 Dec 22 (Saros 156)

=== Inex series ===
This eclipse is a part of the long period inex cycle, repeating at alternating nodes, every 358 synodic months (≈ 10,571.95 days, or 29 years minus 20 days). Their appearance and longitude are irregular due to a lack of synchronization with the anomalistic month (period of perigee). However, groupings of 3 inex cycles (≈ 87 years minus 2 months) comes close (≈ 1,151.02 anomalistic months), so eclipses are similar in these groupings.

Series members between 1801 and 2200
1803 Mar 08 (Saros 139)	1832 Feb 16 (Saros 140)	1861 Jan 26 (Saros 141)
1890 Jan 06 (Saros 142)	1918 Dec 17 (Saros 143)	1947 Nov 28 (Saros 144)
1976 Nov 06 (Saros 145)	2005 Oct 17 (Saros 146)	2034 Sep 28 (Saros 147)
2063 Sep 07 (Saros 148)	2092 Aug 17 (Saros 149)	2121 Jul 30 (Saros 150)
2150 Jul 09 (Saros 151)	2179 Jun 19 (Saros 152)	

=== Half-Saros cycle ===
A lunar eclipse will be preceded and followed by solar eclipses by 9 years and 5.5 days (a half saros). This lunar eclipse is related to two total solar eclipses of Solar Saros 154.

September 21, 2025	October 3, 2043

== See also ==
- List of lunar eclipses and List of 21st-century lunar eclipses
