= October 2052 lunar eclipse =

Astronomical event

- Partial eclipse
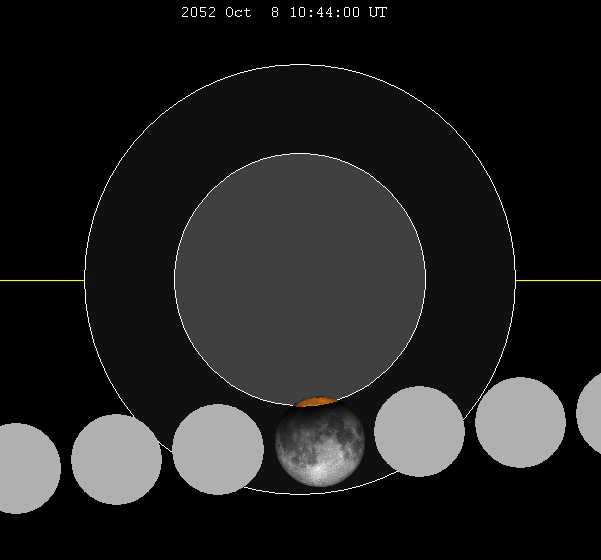
- The Moon's hourly motion shown right to left
- Date: October 8, 2052
- Gamma: −0.9726
- Magnitude: 0.0821
- Saros cycle: 147 (10 of 70)
- Partiality: 63 minutes, 16 seconds
- Penumbral: 256 minutes, 37 seconds
Contacts (UTC)
- P1: 8:36:02
- U1: 10:12:46
- Greatest: 10:44:19
- U4: 11:16:02
- P4: 12:52:38

A partial lunar eclipse will occur at the Moon’s descending node of orbit on Tuesday, October 8, 2052, with an umbral magnitude of 0.0821. A lunar eclipse occurs when the Moon moves into the Earth's shadow, causing the Moon to be darkened. A partial lunar eclipse occurs when one part of the Moon is in the Earth's umbra, while the other part is in the Earth's penumbra. Unlike a solar eclipse, which can only be viewed from a relatively small area of the world, a lunar eclipse may be viewed from anywhere on the night side of Earth. Occurring about 2.1 days before perigee (on October 10, 2052, at 11:35 UTC), the Moon's apparent diameter will be larger.

== Visibility ==
The eclipse will be completely visible over northeast Asia, eastern Australia, and western North America, seen rising over east and south Asia and western Australia and setting over eastern North America and much of South America.

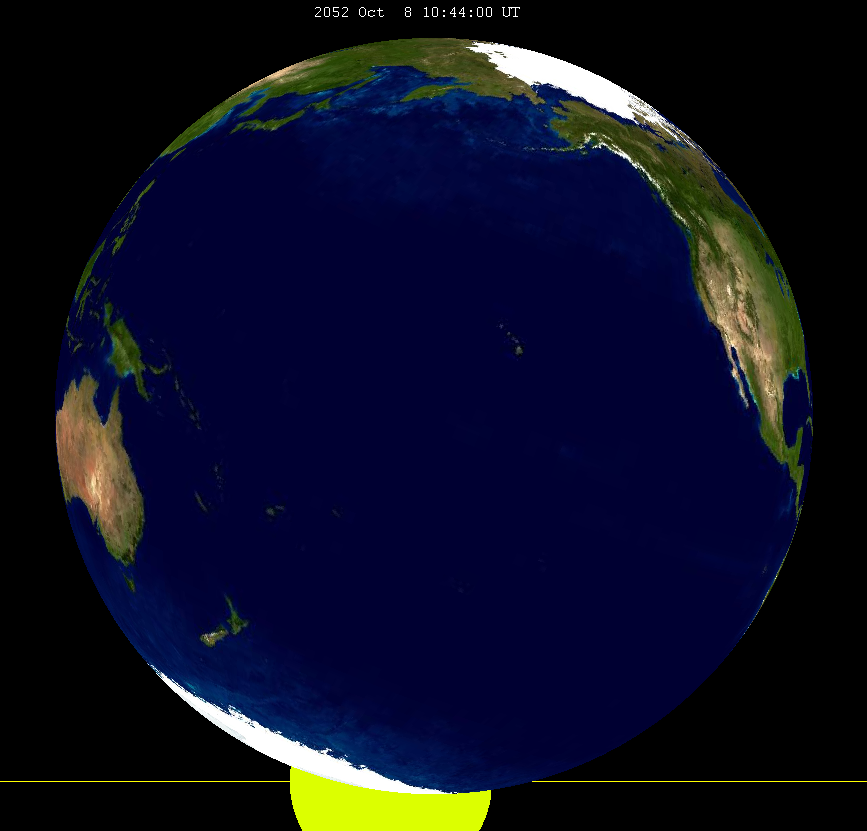
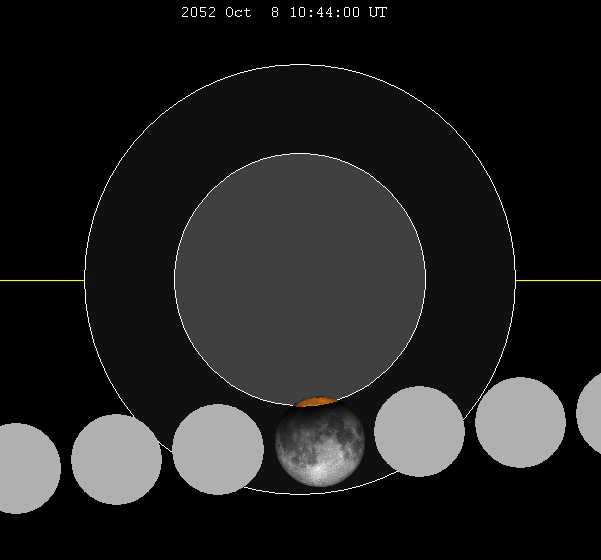

== Eclipse details ==
Shown below is a table displaying details about this particular lunar eclipse. It describes various parameters pertaining to this eclipse.

October 8, 2052 Lunar Eclipse Parameters
Parameter	Value
Penumbral Magnitude	1.06533
Umbral Magnitude	0.08320
Gamma	−0.97270
Sun Right Ascension	12h58m28.0s
Sun Declination	-06°14'27.6"
Sun Semi-Diameter	16'00.5"
Sun Equatorial Horizontal Parallax	08.8"
Moon Right Ascension	00h59m36.6s
Moon Declination	+05°18'49.9"
Moon Semi-Diameter	16'18.0"
Moon Equatorial Horizontal Parallax	0°59'49.3"
ΔT	86.9 s

== Eclipse season ==
This eclipse is part of an eclipse season, a period, roughly every six months, when eclipses occur. Only two (or occasionally three) eclipse seasons occur each year, and each season lasts about 35 days and repeats just short of six months (173 days) later; thus two full eclipse seasons always occur each year. Either two or three eclipses happen each eclipse season. In the sequence below, each eclipse is separated by a fortnight.

Eclipse season of September–October 2052
September 22 Ascending node (new moon)	October 8 Descending node (full moon)
Annular solar eclipse Solar Saros 135	Partial lunar eclipse Lunar Saros 147

== Related eclipses ==
=== Eclipses in 2052 ===
- A total solar eclipse on March 30.
- A penumbral lunar eclipse on April 14.
- An annular solar eclipse on September 22.
- A partial lunar eclipse on October 8.

=== Metonic ===
- Preceded by: Lunar eclipse of December 20, 2048
- Followed by: Lunar eclipse of July 26, 2056

=== Tzolkinex ===
- Preceded by: Lunar eclipse of August 27, 2045
- Followed by: Lunar eclipse of November 19, 2059

=== Half-Saros ===
- Preceded by: Solar eclipse of October 3, 2043
- Followed by: Solar eclipse of October 13, 2061

=== Tritos ===
- Preceded by: Lunar eclipse of November 8, 2041
- Followed by: Lunar eclipse of September 7, 2063

=== Lunar Saros 147 ===
- Preceded by: Lunar eclipse of September 28, 2034
- Followed by: Lunar eclipse of October 19, 2070

=== Inex ===
- Preceded by: Lunar eclipse of October 28, 2023
- Followed by: Lunar eclipse of September 18, 2081

=== Triad ===
- Preceded by: Lunar eclipse of December 8, 1965
- Followed by: Lunar eclipse of August 10, 2139

=== Lunar eclipses of 2049–2052 ===
This eclipse is a member of a semester series. An eclipse in a semester series of lunar eclipses repeats approximately every 177 days and 4 hours (a semester) at alternating nodes of the Moon's orbit.

The penumbral lunar eclipse on June 15, 2049 occurs in the previous lunar year eclipse set.

Lunar eclipse series sets from 2049 to 2052
Ascending node				Descending node			
Saros	Date Viewing	Type Chart	Gamma	Saros	Date Viewing	Type Chart	Gamma
112	2049 May 17	Penumbral	−1.1337	117	2049 Nov 09	Penumbral	1.1964
122	2050 May 06	Total	−0.4181	127	2050 Oct 30	Total	0.4435
132	2051 Apr 26	Total	0.3371	137	2051 Oct 19	Total	−0.2542
142	2052 Apr 14	Penumbral	1.0628	147	2052 Oct 08	Partial	−0.9726

=== Saros 147 ===
This eclipse is a part of Saros series 147, repeating every 18 years, 11 days, and containing 70 events. The series started with a penumbral lunar eclipse on July 2, 1890. It contains partial eclipses from September 28, 2034 through May 27, 2431; total eclipses from June 6, 2449 through October 5, 2647; and a second set of partial eclipses from October 16, 2665 through May 1, 2990. The series ends at member 70 as a penumbral eclipse on July 28, 3145.

The longest duration of totality will be produced by member 37 at 105 minutes, 18 seconds on August 1, 2539. All eclipses in this series occur at the Moon’s descending node of orbit.

Greatest	First			
The greatest eclipse of the series will occur on 2539 Aug 01, lasting 105 minutes, 18 seconds.	Penumbral	Partial	Total	Central
The greatest eclipse of the series will occur on 2539 Aug 01, lasting 105 minutes, 18 seconds.	1890 Jul 02	2034 Sep 28	2449 Jun 06	2485 Jun 28
The greatest eclipse of the series will occur on 2539 Aug 01, lasting 105 minutes, 18 seconds.	Last			
The greatest eclipse of the series will occur on 2539 Aug 01, lasting 105 minutes, 18 seconds.	Central	Total	Partial	Penumbral
The greatest eclipse of the series will occur on 2539 Aug 01, lasting 105 minutes, 18 seconds.	2593 Sep 02	2647 Oct 05	2990 May 01	3134 Jul 28

Eclipses are tabulated in three columns; every third eclipse in the same column is one exeligmos apart, so they all cast shadows over approximately the same parts of the Earth.

Series members 1–18 occur between 1890 and 2200:
1	2	3
1890 Jul 02	1908 Jul 13	1926 Jul 25
4	5	6
1944 Aug 04	1962 Aug 15	1980 Aug 26
7	8	9
1998 Sep 06	2016 Sep 16	2034 Sep 28
10	11	12
2052 Oct 08	2070 Oct 19	2088 Oct 30
13	14	15
2106 Nov 11	2124 Nov 21	2142 Dec 03
16	17	18
2160 Dec 13	2178 Dec 24	2197 Jan 04

=== Tritos series ===
This eclipse is a part of a tritos cycle, repeating at alternating nodes every 135 synodic months (≈ 3986.63 days, or 11 years minus 1 month). Their appearance and longitude are irregular due to a lack of synchronization with the anomalistic month (period of perigee), but groupings of 3 tritos cycles (≈ 33 years minus 3 months) come close (≈ 434.044 anomalistic months), so eclipses are similar in these groupings.

Series members between 1801 and 2183
1801 Sep 22 (Saros 124)	1812 Aug 22 (Saros 125)	1823 Jul 23 (Saros 126)	1834 Jun 21 (Saros 127)	1845 May 21 (Saros 128)
1856 Apr 20 (Saros 129)	1867 Mar 20 (Saros 130)	1878 Feb 17 (Saros 131)	1889 Jan 17 (Saros 132)	1899 Dec 17 (Saros 133)
1910 Nov 17 (Saros 134)	1921 Oct 16 (Saros 135)	1932 Sep 14 (Saros 136)	1943 Aug 15 (Saros 137)	1954 Jul 16 (Saros 138)
1965 Jun 14 (Saros 139)	1976 May 13 (Saros 140)	1987 Apr 14 (Saros 141)	1998 Mar 13 (Saros 142)	2009 Feb 09 (Saros 143)
2020 Jan 10 (Saros 144)	2030 Dec 09 (Saros 145)	2041 Nov 08 (Saros 146)	2052 Oct 08 (Saros 147)	2063 Sep 07 (Saros 148)
2074 Aug 07 (Saros 149)	2085 Jul 07 (Saros 150)	2096 Jun 06 (Saros 151)	2107 May 07 (Saros 152)	
		2151 Jan 02 (Saros 156)		2172 Oct 31 (Saros 158)
2183 Oct 01 (Saros 159)

=== Inex series ===
This eclipse is a part of the long period inex cycle, repeating at alternating nodes, every 358 synodic months (≈ 10,571.95 days, or 29 years minus 20 days). Their appearance and longitude are irregular due to a lack of synchronization with the anomalistic month (period of perigee). However, groupings of 3 inex cycles (≈ 87 years minus 2 months) comes close (≈ 1,151.02 anomalistic months), so eclipses are similar in these groupings.

Series members between 1801 and 2200
1821 Mar 18 (Saros 139)	1850 Feb 26 (Saros 140)	1879 Feb 07 (Saros 141)
1908 Jan 18 (Saros 142)	1936 Dec 28 (Saros 143)	1965 Dec 08 (Saros 144)
1994 Nov 18 (Saros 145)	2023 Oct 28 (Saros 146)	2052 Oct 08 (Saros 147)
2081 Sep 18 (Saros 148)	2110 Aug 29 (Saros 149)	2139 Aug 10 (Saros 150)
2168 Jul 20 (Saros 151)	2197 Jun 29 (Saros 152)	

=== Half-Saros cycle ===
A lunar eclipse will be preceded and followed by solar eclipses by 9 years and 5.5 days (a half saros). This lunar eclipse is related to two total solar eclipses of Solar Saros 154.

October 3, 2043	October 13, 2061

== See also ==
- List of lunar eclipses and List of 21st-century lunar eclipses
