= Lunar Saros 147 =

Eclipse cycle of the moon

Member 8
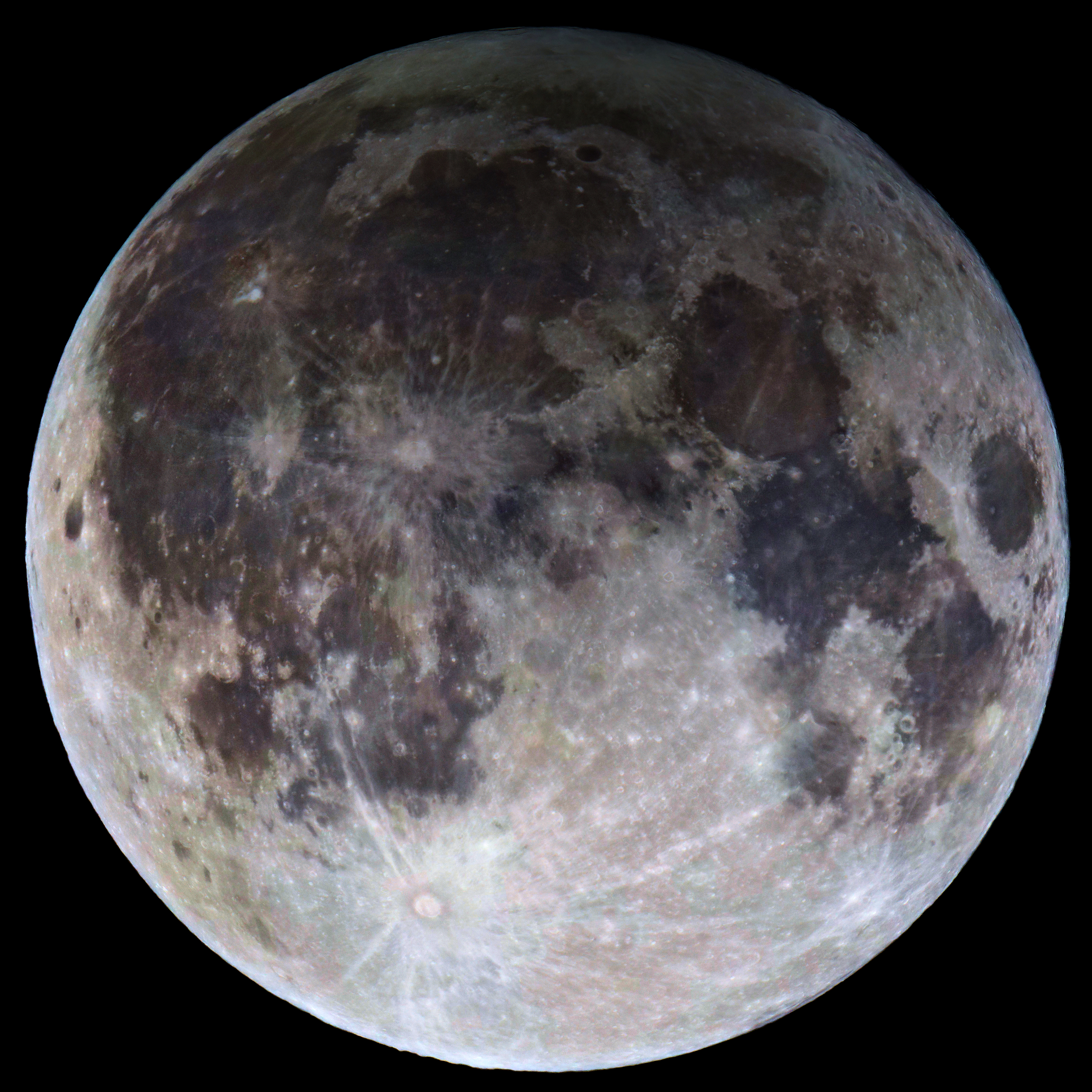
September 16, 2016

Saros cycle series 147 for lunar eclipses occurs at the moon's descending node, repeats every 18 years 11 and 1/3 days. It contains 70 events.

Cat.	Saros	Mem	Date	Time UT (hr:mn)	Type	Gamma	Magnitude	Duration (min)			Contacts UT (hr:mn)						Chart
Cat.	Saros	Mem	Date	Greatest	Type	Gamma	Magnitude	Pen.	Par.	Tot.	P1	P4	U1	U2	U3	U4	Chart
09396	147	1	1890 Jul 02	14:08:36	Penumbral	-1.4871	-0.8445	85.3			13:25:57	14:51:15					
09439	147	2	1908 Jul 13	21:33:55	Penumbral	-1.4185	-0.7195	126.3			20:30:46	22:37:04					
09481	147	3	1926 Jul 25	5:00:12	Penumbral	-1.3511	-0.5970	155.5			3:42:27	6:17:57					
09523	147	4	1944 Aug 04	12:26:51	Penumbral	-1.2842	-0.4758	179.1			10:57:18	13:56:24					
09564	147	5	1962 Aug 15	19:57:30	Penumbral	-1.2210	-0.3616	198.2			18:18:24	21:36:36					
09605	147	6	1980 Aug 26	3:31:20	Penumbral	-1.1608	-0.2531	214.4			1:44:08	5:18:32					
09646	147	7	1998 Sep 06	11:11:11	Penumbral	-1.1057	-0.1544	227.8			9:17:17	13:05:05					
09687	147	8	2016 Sep 16	18:55:27	Penumbral	-1.0548	-0.0635	239.3			16:55:48	20:55:06					
09728	147	9	2034 Sep 28	2:47:37	Partial	-1.0110	0.0144	248.7	26.7		0:43:16	4:51:58	2:34:16			3:00:58	
09768	147	10	2052 Oct 08	10:45:58	Partial	-0.9726	0.0821	256.6	63.3		8:37:40	12:54:16	10:14:19			11:17:37	
09809	147	11	2070 Oct 19	18:51:12	Partial	-0.9406	0.1383	263.2	81.7		16:39:36	21:02:48	18:10:21			19:32:03	
09850	147	12	2088 Oct 30	3:03:20	Partial	-0.9147	0.1831	268.5	93.6		0:49:05	5:17:35	2:16:32			3:50:08	
09892	147	13	2106 Nov 11	11:22:14	Partial	-0.8947	0.2171	272.8	101.7		9:05:50	13:38:38	10:31:23			12:13:05	
09934	147	14	2124 Nov 21	19:47:21	Partial	-0.8808	0.2401	276.1	106.9		17:29:18	22:05:24	18:53:54			20:40:48	
09977	147	15	2142 Dec 03	4:16:11	Partial	-0.8704	0.2569	278.9	110.6		1:56:44	6:35:38	3:20:53			5:11:29	
10021	147	16	2160 Dec 13	12:50:19	Partial	-0.8650	0.2646	280.8	112.4		10:29:55	15:10:43	11:54:07			13:46:31	
10064	147	17	2178 Dec 24	21:26:20	Partial	-0.8614	0.2694	282.5	113.6		19:05:05	23:47:35	20:29:32			22:23:08	
10107	147	18	2197 Jan 04	6:04:04	Partial	-0.8601	0.2703	283.8	114.1		3:42:10	8:25:58	5:07:01			7:01:07	
10151	147	19	2215 Jan 16	14:40:00	Partial	-0.8578	0.2732	285.2	115.0		12:17:24	17:02:36	13:42:30			15:37:30	
10195	147	20	2233 Jan 26	23:15:04	Partial	-0.8553	0.2767	286.6	116.0		20:51:46	1:38:22	22:17:04			0:13:04	
10241	147	21	2251 Feb 07	7:45:40	Partial	-0.8497	0.2862	288.4	118.1		5:21:28	10:09:52	6:46:37			8:44:43	
10287	147	22	2269 Feb 17	16:11:18	Partial	-0.8406	0.3023	290.7	121.5		13:45:57	18:36:39	15:10:33			17:12:03	
10333	147	23	2287 Mar 01	0:30:02	Partial	-0.8265	0.3278	293.6	126.4		22:03:14	2:56:50	23:26:50			1:33:14	
10379	147	24	2305 Mar 12	8:41:35	Partial	-0.8072	0.3629	297.2	132.7		6:12:59	11:10:11	7:35:14			9:47:56	
10425	147	25	2323 Mar 23	16:43:41	Partial	-0.7809	0.4110	301.6	140.6		14:12:53	19:14:29	15:33:23			17:53:59	
10471	147	26	2341 Apr 03	0:36:59	Partial	-0.7480	0.4713	306.6	149.6		22:03:41	3:10:17	23:22:11			1:51:47	
10516	147	27	2359 Apr 14	8:20:06	Partial	-0.7077	0.5452	312.4	159.6		5:43:54	10:56:18	7:00:18			9:39:54	
10561	147	28	2377 Apr 24	15:54:42	Partial	-0.6611	0.6307	318.5	169.8		13:15:27	18:33:57	14:29:48			17:19:36	
10605	147	29	2395 May 5	23:17:48	Partial	-0.6059	0.7316	325.0	180.5		20:35:18	2:00:18	21:47:33			0:48:03	
10651	147	30	2413 May 16	6:33:36	Partial	-0.5457	0.8419	331.5	190.5		3:47:51	9:19:21	4:58:21			8:08:51	
10695	147	31	2431 May 27	13:39:33	Partial	-0.4783	0.9651	338.0	200.2		10:50:33	16:28:33	11:59:27			15:19:39	
10739	147	32	2449 Jun 06	20:40:00	Total	-0.4068	1.0956	344.0	208.7	48.3	17:48:00	23:32:00	18:55:39	20:15:51	21:04:09	22:24:21	
10782	147	33	2467 Jun 18	3:31:37	Total	-0.3290	1.2374	349.5	216.3	72.8	0:36:52	6:26:22	1:43:28	2:55:13	4:08:01	5:19:46	
10824	147	34	2485 Jun 28	10:20:45	Total	-0.2499	1.3816	354.2	222.4	87.8	7:23:39	13:17:51	8:29:33	9:36:51	11:04:39	12:11:57	
10865	147	35	2503 Jul 10	17:04:26	Total	-0.1673	1.5317	358.1	227.0	97.7	14:05:23	20:03:29	15:10:56	16:15:35	17:53:17	18:57:56	
10906	147	36	2521 Jul 20	23:47:33	Total	-0.0849	1.6814	361.1	229.9	103.3	20:47:00	2:48:06	21:52:36	22:55:54	0:39:12	1:42:30	
10946	147	37	2539 Aug 01	6:28:18	Total	-0.0012	1.8333	363.0	231.3	105.3	3:26:48	9:29:48	4:32:39	5:35:39	7:20:57	8:23:57	
10988	147	38	2557 Aug 11	13:11:57	Total	0.0794	1.6879	363.9	231.1	103.8	10:10:00	16:13:54	11:16:24	12:20:03	14:03:51	15:07:30	
11029	147	39	2575 Aug 22	19:56:32	Total	0.1584	1.5408	364.0	229.3	98.8	16:54:32	22:58:32	18:01:53	19:07:08	20:45:56	21:51:11	
11069	147	40	2593 Sep 02	2:44:50	Total	0.2335	1.4006	363.2	226.2	90.3	23:43:14	5:46:26	0:51:44	1:59:41	3:29:59	4:37:56	
11109	147	41	2611 Sep 14	9:37:36	Total	0.3042	1.2685	361.7	221.9	77.8	6:36:45	12:38:27	7:46:39	8:58:42	10:16:30	11:28:33	
11149	147	42	2629 Sep 24	16:36:45	Total	0.3690	1.1472	359.7	216.7	60.2	13:36:54	19:36:36	14:48:24	16:06:39	17:06:51	18:25:06	
11190	147	43	2647 Oct 05	23:42:33	Total	0.4277	1.0370	357.4	210.9	31.3	20:43:51	2:41:15	21:57:06	23:26:54	23:58:12	1:28:00	
11232	147	44	2665 Oct 16	6:55:19	Partial	0.4800	0.9385	354.9	204.7		3:57:52	9:52:46	5:12:58			8:37:40	
11275	147	45	2683 Oct 27	14:16:32	Partial	0.5247	0.8540	352.5	198.6		11:20:17	17:12:47	12:37:14			15:55:50	
11317	147	46	2701 Nov 07	21:45:22	Partial	0.5629	0.7818	350.3	192.7		18:50:13	0:40:31	20:09:01			23:21:43	
11360	147	47	2719 Nov 19	5:21:16	Partial	0.5947	0.7212	348.3	187.3		2:27:07	8:15:25	3:47:37			6:54:55	
11402	147	48	2737 Nov 29	13:04:48	Partial	0.6201	0.6727	346.6	182.6		10:11:30	15:58:06	11:33:30			14:36:06	
11445	147	49	2755 Dec 10	20:54:39	Partial	0.6402	0.6342	345.3	178.6		18:02:00	23:47:18	19:25:21			22:23:57	
11489	147	50	2773 Dec 21	4:50:12	Partial	0.6553	0.6051	344.3	175.4		1:58:03	7:42:21	3:22:30			6:17:54	
11535	147	51	2792 Jan 01	12:48:24	Partial	0.6682	0.5804	343.4	172.6		9:56:42	15:40:06	11:22:06			14:14:42	
11581	147	52	2810 Jan 11	20:50:27	Partial	0.6779	0.5620	342.6	170.5		17:59:09	23:41:45	19:25:12			22:15:42	
11629	147	53	2828 Jan 23	4:52:44	Partial	0.6877	0.5439	341.7	168.3		2:01:53	7:43:35	3:28:35			6:16:53	
11676	147	54	2846 Feb 02	12:54:05	Partial	0.6979	0.5253	340.5	165.9		10:03:50	15:44:20	11:31:08			14:17:02	
11722	147	55	2864 Feb 13	20:52:07	Partial	0.7108	0.5022	338.9	162.8		18:02:40	23:41:34	19:30:43			22:13:31	
11768	147	56	2882 Feb 24	4:46:33	Partial	0.7267	0.4740	336.8	158.9		1:58:09	7:34:57	3:27:06			6:06:00	
11814	147	57	2900 Mar 07	12:35:27	Partial	0.7471	0.4377	333.9	153.6		9:48:30	15:22:24	11:18:39			13:52:15	
11859	147	58	2918 Mar 18	20:16:49	Partial	0.7735	0.3907	330.0	146.1		17:31:49	23:01:49	19:03:46			21:29:52	
11904	147	59	2936 Mar 29	3:51:11	Partial	0.8056	0.3334	325.0	136.1		1:08:41	6:33:41	2:43:08			4:59:14	
11949	147	60	2954 Apr 09	11:16:53	Partial	0.8444	0.2641	318.7	122.3		8:37:32	13:56:14	10:15:44			12:18:02	
11995	147	61	2972 Apr 19	18:34:31	Partial	0.8899	0.1826	310.8	102.9		15:59:07	21:09:55	17:43:04			19:25:58	
12039	147	62	2990 May 1	1:43:20	Partial	0.9427	0.0880	301.1	72.3		23:12:47	4:13:53	1:07:11			2:19:29	

== See also ==
- List of lunar eclipses
  - List of Saros series for lunar eclipses
