= Solar eclipse of October 13, 2061 =

Future annular solar eclipse

- Annular eclipse
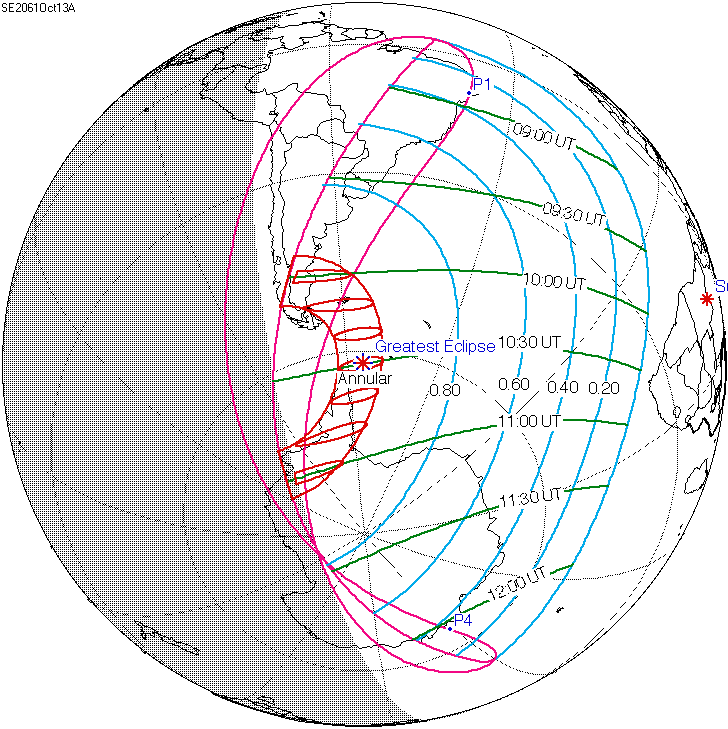
- Map
- Gamma: −0.9639
- Magnitude: 0.9469

Maximum eclipse
- Duration: 221 s (3 min 41 s)
- Coordinates: 62.1°S 54.4°W
- Max. width of band: 743 km (462 mi)

Times (UTC)
- Greatest eclipse: 10:32:10

References
- Saros: 154 (9 of 71)
- Catalog # (SE5000): 9645

An annular solar eclipse will occur at the Moon's descending node of orbit on Thursday, October 13, 2061, with a magnitude of 0.9469. A solar eclipse occurs when the Moon passes between Earth and the Sun, thereby totally or partly obscuring the image of the Sun for a viewer on Earth. An annular solar eclipse occurs when the Moon's apparent diameter is smaller than the Sun's, blocking most of the Sun's light and causing the Sun to look like an annulus (ring). An annular eclipse appears as a partial eclipse over a region of the Earth thousands of kilometres wide. Occurring about 1.1 days before apogee (on April 21, 2061, at 4:00 UTC), the Moon's apparent diameter will be smaller.

The path of annularity will be visible from parts of southern Chile, southern Argentina, the Falkland Islands, and Antarctica. A partial solar eclipse will also be visible for much of South America and Antarctica.

== Eclipse details ==
Shown below are two tables displaying details about this particular solar eclipse. The first table outlines times at which the Moon's penumbra or umbra attains the specific parameter, and the second table describes various other parameters pertaining to this eclipse.

October 13, 2061 Solar Eclipse Times
Event	Time (UTC)
First Penumbral External Contact	2061 October 13 at 08:10:37.0 UTC
First Umbral External Contact	2061 October 13 at 09:55:37.2 UTC
First Central Line	2061 October 13 at 10:02:17.8 UTC
First Umbral Internal Contact	2061 October 13 at 10:10:51.8 UTC
Greatest Eclipse	2061 October 13 at 10:32:09.7 UTC
Greatest Duration	2061 October 13 at 10:35:25.8 UTC
Ecliptic Conjunction	2061 October 13 at 10:43:11.8 UTC
Last Umbral Internal Contact	2061 October 13 at 10:52:48.0 UTC
Last Central Line	2061 October 13 at 11:01:25.4 UTC
Last Umbral External Contact	2061 October 13 at 11:08:09.4 UTC
Equatorial Conjunction	2061 October 13 at 11:30:32.9 UTC
Last Penumbral External Contact	2061 October 13 at 12:53:24.7 UTC

October 13, 2061 Solar Eclipse Parameters
Parameter	Value
Eclipse Magnitude	0.94691
Eclipse Obscuration	0.89664
Gamma	−0.96393
Sun Right Ascension	13h16m11.1s
Sun Declination	-08°03'03.6"
Sun Semi-Diameter	16'01.7"
Sun Equatorial Horizontal Parallax	08.8"
Moon Right Ascension	13h14m30.5s
Moon Declination	-08°50'16.1"
Moon Semi-Diameter	15'07.5"
Moon Equatorial Horizontal Parallax	0°55'30.4"
ΔT	91.6 s

== Eclipse season ==
This eclipse is part of an eclipse season, a period, roughly every six months, when eclipses occur. Only two (or occasionally three) eclipse seasons occur each year, and each season lasts about 35 days and repeats just short of six months (173 days) later; thus two full eclipse seasons always occur each year. Either two or three eclipses happen each eclipse season. In the sequence below, each eclipse is separated by a fortnight.

Eclipse season of September–October 2061
September 29 Ascending node (full moon)	October 13 Descending node (new moon)
Total lunar eclipse Lunar Saros 128	Annular solar eclipse Solar Saros 154

== Related eclipses ==
=== Eclipses in 2061 ===
- A total lunar eclipse on April 4.
- A total solar eclipse on April 20.
- A total lunar eclipse on September 29.
- An annular solar eclipse on October 13.

=== Metonic ===
- Preceded by: Solar eclipse of December 26, 2057
- Followed by: Solar eclipse of August 2, 2065

=== Tzolkinex ===
- Preceded by: Solar eclipse of September 2, 2054
- Followed by: Solar eclipse of November 24, 2068

=== Half-Saros ===
- Preceded by: Lunar eclipse of October 8, 2052
- Followed by: Lunar eclipse of October 19, 2070

=== Tritos ===
- Preceded by: Solar eclipse of November 14, 2050
- Followed by: Solar eclipse of September 12, 2072

=== Solar Saros 154 ===
- Preceded by: Solar eclipse of October 3, 2043
- Followed by: Solar eclipse of October 24, 2079

=== Inex ===
- Preceded by: Solar eclipse of November 3, 2032
- Followed by: Solar eclipse of September 23, 2090

=== Triad ===
- Preceded by: Solar eclipse of December 13, 1974
- Followed by: Solar eclipse of August 14, 2148

=== Solar eclipses of 2058–2061 ===
This eclipse is a member of a semester series. An eclipse in a semester series of solar eclipses repeats approximately every 177 days and 4 hours (a semester) at alternating nodes of the Moon's orbit.

The partial solar eclipse on June 21, 2058 occurs in the previous lunar year eclipse set.

Solar eclipse series sets from 2058 to 2061
Ascending node			Descending node		
Saros	Map	Gamma	Saros	Map	Gamma
119	May 22, 2058 Partial	−1.3194	124	November 16, 2058 Partial	1.1224
129	May 11, 2059 Total	−0.508	134	November 5, 2059 Annular	0.4454
139	April 30, 2060 Total	0.2422	144	October 24, 2060 Annular	−0.2625
149	April 20, 2061 Total	0.9578	154	October 13, 2061 Annular	−0.9639

=== Saros 154 ===
This eclipse is a part of Saros series 154, repeating every 18 years, 11 days, and containing 71 events. The series started with a partial solar eclipse on July 19, 1917. It contains annular eclipses from October 3, 2043, through March 27, 2332; hybrid eclipses from April 7, 2350 through April 29, 2386; and total eclipses from May 9, 2404 through May 29, 3035. The series ends at member 71 as a partial eclipse on August 25, 3179. Its eclipses are tabulated in three columns; every third eclipse in the same column is one exeligmos apart, so they all cast shadows over approximately the same parts of the Earth.

The longest duration of annularity will be produced by member 9 at 3 minutes, 41 seconds on October 13, 2061, and the longest duration of totality will be produced by member 35 at 4 minutes, 50 seconds on July 25, 2530. All eclipses in this series occur at the Moon’s descending node of orbit.

Series members 1–16 occur between 1917 and 2200:
1	2	3
July 19, 1917	July 30, 1935	August 9, 1953
4	5	6
August 20, 1971	August 31, 1989	September 11, 2007
7	8	9
September 21, 2025	October 3, 2043	October 13, 2061
10	11	12
October 24, 2079	November 4, 2097	November 16, 2115
13	14	15
November 26, 2133	December 8, 2151	December 18, 2169
16
December 29, 2187

=== Metonic series ===
The metonic series repeats eclipses every 19 years (6939.69 days), lasting about 5 cycles. Eclipses occur in nearly the same calendar date. In addition, the octon subseries repeats 1/5 of that or every 3.8 years (1387.94 days). All eclipses in this table occur at the Moon's descending node.

21 eclipse events between May 21, 1993 and May 20, 2069
May 20–21	March 9	December 25–26	October 13–14	August 1–2
118	120	122	124	126
May 21, 1993	March 9, 1997	December 25, 2000	October 14, 2004	August 1, 2008
128	130	132	134	136
May 20, 2012	March 9, 2016	December 26, 2019	October 14, 2023	August 2, 2027
138	140	142	144	146
May 21, 2031	March 9, 2035	December 26, 2038	October 14, 2042	August 2, 2046
148	150	152	154	156
May 20, 2050	March 9, 2054	December 26, 2057	October 13, 2061	August 2, 2065
158
May 20, 2069

=== Tritos series ===
This eclipse is a part of a tritos cycle, repeating at alternating nodes every 135 synodic months (≈ 3986.63 days, or 11 years minus 1 month). Their appearance and longitude are irregular due to a lack of synchronization with the anomalistic month (period of perigee), but groupings of 3 tritos cycles (≈ 33 years minus 3 months) come close (≈ 434.044 anomalistic months), so eclipses are similar in these groupings.

The partial solar eclipses on December 7, 2170 (part of Saros 164) and November 7, 2181 (part of Saros 165) are also a part of this series but are not included in the table below.

Series members between 1801 and 2105
September 28, 1810 (Saros 131)	August 27, 1821 (Saros 132)	July 27, 1832 (Saros 133)	June 27, 1843 (Saros 134)	May 26, 1854 (Saros 135)
April 25, 1865 (Saros 136)	March 25, 1876 (Saros 137)	February 22, 1887 (Saros 138)	January 22, 1898 (Saros 139)	December 23, 1908 (Saros 140)
November 22, 1919 (Saros 141)	October 21, 1930 (Saros 142)	September 21, 1941 (Saros 143)	August 20, 1952 (Saros 144)	July 20, 1963 (Saros 145)
June 20, 1974 (Saros 146)	May 19, 1985 (Saros 147)	April 17, 1996 (Saros 148)	March 19, 2007 (Saros 149)	February 15, 2018 (Saros 150)
January 14, 2029 (Saros 151)	December 15, 2039 (Saros 152)	November 14, 2050 (Saros 153)	October 13, 2061 (Saros 154)	September 12, 2072 (Saros 155)
August 13, 2083 (Saros 156)	July 12, 2094 (Saros 157)	June 12, 2105 (Saros 158)		

=== Inex series ===
This eclipse is a part of the long period inex cycle, repeating at alternating nodes, every 358 synodic months (≈ 10,571.95 days, or 29 years minus 20 days). Their appearance and longitude are irregular due to a lack of synchronization with the anomalistic month (period of perigee). However, groupings of 3 inex cycles (≈ 87 years minus 2 months) comes close (≈ 1,151.02 anomalistic months), so eclipses are similar in these groupings.

Series members between 1801 and 2200
April 13, 1801 (Saros 145)	March 24, 1830 (Saros 146)	March 4, 1859 (Saros 147)
February 11, 1888 (Saros 148)	January 23, 1917 (Saros 149)	January 3, 1946 (Saros 150)
December 13, 1974 (Saros 151)	November 23, 2003 (Saros 152)	November 3, 2032 (Saros 153)
October 13, 2061 (Saros 154)	September 23, 2090 (Saros 155)	September 5, 2119 (Saros 156)
August 14, 2148 (Saros 157)	July 25, 2177 (Saros 158)	
