= Solar eclipse of November 4, 2078 =

Future annular solar eclipse

- Annular eclipse
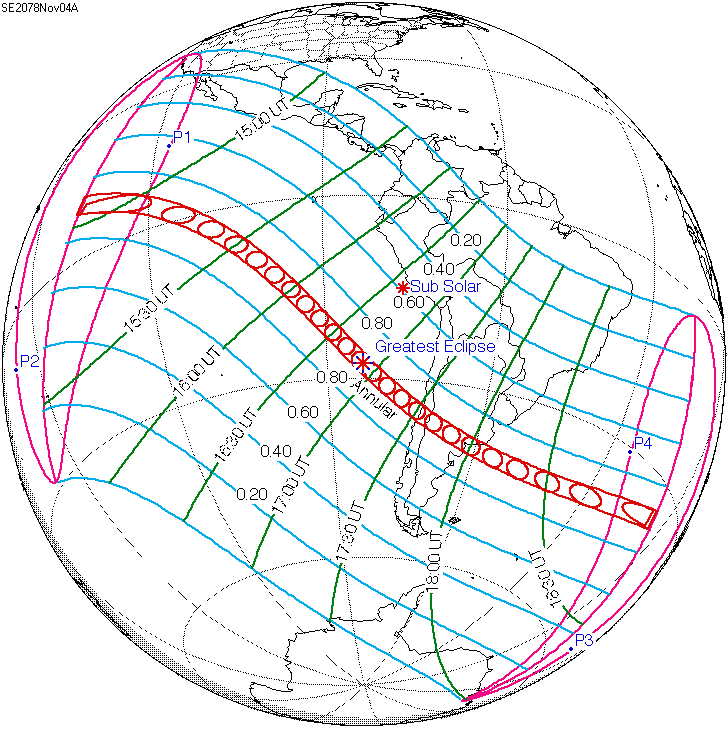
- Map
- Gamma: −0.2285
- Magnitude: 0.9255

Maximum eclipse
- Duration: 509 s (8 min 29 s)
- Coordinates: 27.8°S 83.3°W
- Max. width of band: 287 km (178 mi)

Times (UTC)
- Greatest eclipse: 16:55:44

References
- Saros: 144 (20 of 70)
- Catalog # (SE5000): 9684

An annular solar eclipse will occur at the Moon's descending node of orbit on Friday, November 4, 2078, with a magnitude of 0.9255. A solar eclipse occurs when the Moon passes between Earth and the Sun, thereby totally or partly obscuring the image of the Sun for a viewer on Earth. An annular solar eclipse occurs when the Moon's apparent diameter is smaller than the Sun's, blocking most of the Sun's light and causing the Sun to look like an annulus (ring). An annular eclipse appears as a partial eclipse over a region of the Earth thousands of kilometres wide. Occurring about 22 hours before apogee (on November 5, 2078, at 14:45 UTC), the Moon's apparent diameter will be smaller.

The path of annularity will be visible from parts of Chile, Argentina, and Tristan da Cunha. A partial solar eclipse will also be visible for parts of eastern Oceania, Mexico, the southwestern United States, Central America, South America, and Antarctica.

== Eclipse details ==
Shown below are two tables displaying details about this particular solar eclipse. The first table outlines times at which the Moon's penumbra or umbra attains the specific parameter, and the second table describes various other parameters pertaining to this eclipse.

November 4, 2078 Solar Eclipse Times
Event	Time (UTC)
First Penumbral External Contact	2078 November 4 at 13:50:30.4 UTC
First Umbral External Contact	2078 November 4 at 14:56:36.8 UTC
First Central Line	2078 November 4 at 14:59:50.8 UTC
First Umbral Internal Contact	2078 November 4 at 15:03:05.2 UTC
First Penumbral Internal Contact	2078 November 4 at 16:12:46.9 UTC
Greatest Eclipse	2078 November 4 at 16:55:44.4 UTC
Ecliptic Conjunction	2078 November 4 at 16:58:29.7 UTC
Equatorial Conjunction	2078 November 4 at 17:07:32.6 UTC
Greatest Duration	2078 November 4 at 17:13:29.5 UTC
Last Penumbral Internal Contact	2078 November 4 at 17:38:24.2 UTC
Last Umbral Internal Contact	2078 November 4 at 18:48:15.5 UTC
Last Central Line	2078 November 4 at 18:51:30.7 UTC
Last Umbral External Contact	2078 November 4 at 18:54:45.5 UTC
Last Penumbral External Contact	2078 November 4 at 20:00:55.0 UTC

November 4, 2078 Solar Eclipse Parameters
Parameter	Value
Eclipse Magnitude	0.92551
Eclipse Obscuration	0.85657
Gamma	−0.22852
Sun Right Ascension	14h40m53.9s
Sun Declination	-15°38'07.6"
Sun Semi-Diameter	16'07.5"
Sun Equatorial Horizontal Parallax	08.9"
Moon Right Ascension	14h40m33.5s
Moon Declination	-15°49'24.5"
Moon Semi-Diameter	14'42.4"
Moon Equatorial Horizontal Parallax	0°53'58.5"
ΔT	104.5 s

== Eclipse season ==
This eclipse is part of an eclipse season, a period, roughly every six months, when eclipses occur. Only two (or occasionally three) eclipse seasons occur each year, and each season lasts about 35 days and repeats just short of six months (173 days) later; thus two full eclipse seasons always occur each year. Either two or three eclipses happen each eclipse season. In the sequence below, each eclipse is separated by a fortnight. The first and last eclipse in this sequence is separated by one synodic month.

Eclipse season of October–November 2078
October 21 Ascending node (full moon)	November 4 Descending node (new moon)	November 19 Ascending node (full moon)
Penumbral lunar eclipse Lunar Saros 118	Annular solar eclipse Solar Saros 144	Penumbral lunar eclipse Lunar Saros 156

== Related eclipses ==
=== Eclipses in 2078 ===
- A penumbral lunar eclipse on April 27.
- A total solar eclipse on May 11.
- A penumbral lunar eclipse on October 21.
- An annular solar eclipse on November 4.
- A penumbral lunar eclipse on November 19.

=== Metonic ===
- Preceded by: Solar eclipse of January 16, 2075
- Followed by: Solar eclipse of August 24, 2082

=== Tzolkinex ===
- Preceded by: Solar eclipse of September 23, 2071
- Followed by: Solar eclipse of December 16, 2085

=== Half-Saros ===
- Preceded by: Lunar eclipse of October 30, 2069
- Followed by: Lunar eclipse of November 10, 2087

=== Tritos ===
- Preceded by: Solar eclipse of December 6, 2067
- Followed by: Solar eclipse of October 4, 2089

=== Solar Saros 144 ===
- Preceded by: Solar eclipse of October 24, 2060
- Followed by: Solar eclipse of November 15, 2096

=== Inex ===
- Preceded by: Solar eclipse of November 25, 2049
- Followed by: Solar eclipse of October 16, 2107

=== Triad ===
- Preceded by: Solar eclipse of January 4, 1992
- Followed by: Solar eclipse of September 5, 2165

=== Solar eclipses of 2076–2079 ===
This eclipse is a member of a semester series. An eclipse in a semester series of solar eclipses repeats approximately every 177 days and 4 hours (a semester) at alternating nodes of the Moon's orbit.

The partial solar eclipses on January 6, 2076 and July 1, 2076 occur in the previous lunar year eclipse set.

Solar eclipse series sets from 2076 to 2079
Ascending node			Descending node		
Saros	Map	Gamma	Saros	Map	Gamma
119	June 1, 2076 Partial	−1.3897	124	November 26, 2076 Partial	1.1401
129	May 22, 2077 Total	−0.5725	134	November 15, 2077 Annular	0.4705
139	May 11, 2078 Total	0.1838	144	November 4, 2078 Annular	−0.2285
149	May 1, 2079 Total	0.9081	154	October 24, 2079 Annular	−0.9243

=== Saros 144 ===
This eclipse is a part of Saros series 144, repeating every 18 years, 11 days, and containing 70 events. The series started with a partial solar eclipse on April 11, 1736. It contains annular eclipses from July 7, 1880 through August 27, 2565. There are no hybrid or total eclipses in this set. The series ends at member 70 as a partial eclipse on May 5, 2980. Its eclipses are tabulated in three columns; every third eclipse in the same column is one exeligmos apart, so they all cast shadows over approximately the same parts of the Earth.

The longest duration of annularity will be produced by member 51 at 9 minutes, 52 seconds on December 29, 2168. All eclipses in this series occur at the Moon’s descending node of orbit.

Series members 5–26 occur between 1801 and 2200:
5	6	7
May 25, 1808	June 5, 1826	June 16, 1844
8	9	10
June 27, 1862	July 7, 1880	July 18, 1898
11	12	13
July 30, 1916	August 10, 1934	August 20, 1952
14	15	16
August 31, 1970	September 11, 1988	September 22, 2006
17	18	19
October 2, 2024	October 14, 2042	October 24, 2060
20	21	22
November 4, 2078	November 15, 2096	November 27, 2114
23	24	25
December 7, 2132	December 19, 2150	December 29, 2168
26
January 9, 2187

=== Metonic series ===
The metonic series repeats eclipses every 19 years (6939.69 days), lasting about 5 cycles. Eclipses occur in nearly the same calendar date. In addition, the octon subseries repeats 1/5 of that or every 3.8 years (1387.94 days). All eclipses in this table occur at the Moon's descending node.

22 eclipse events between June 12, 2029 and November 4, 2116
June 11–12	March 30–31	January 16	November 4–5	August 23–24
118	120	122	124	126
June 12, 2029	March 30, 2033	January 16, 2037	November 4, 2040	August 23, 2044
128	130	132	134	136
June 11, 2048	March 30, 2052	January 16, 2056	November 5, 2059	August 24, 2063
138	140	142	144	146
June 11, 2067	March 31, 2071	January 16, 2075	November 4, 2078	August 24, 2082
148	150	152	154	156
June 11, 2086	March 31, 2090	January 16, 2094	November 4, 2097	August 24, 2101
158	160	162	164	
June 12, 2105			November 4, 2116	

=== Tritos series ===
This eclipse is a part of a tritos cycle, repeating at alternating nodes every 135 synodic months (≈ 3986.63 days, or 11 years minus 1 month). Their appearance and longitude are irregular due to a lack of synchronization with the anomalistic month (period of perigee), but groupings of 3 tritos cycles (≈ 33 years minus 3 months) come close (≈ 434.044 anomalistic months), so eclipses are similar in these groupings.

Series members between 1801 and 2200
December 21, 1805 (Saros 119)	November 19, 1816 (Saros 120)	October 20, 1827 (Saros 121)	September 18, 1838 (Saros 122)	August 18, 1849 (Saros 123)
July 18, 1860 (Saros 124)	June 18, 1871 (Saros 125)	May 17, 1882 (Saros 126)	April 16, 1893 (Saros 127)	March 17, 1904 (Saros 128)
February 14, 1915 (Saros 129)	January 14, 1926 (Saros 130)	December 13, 1936 (Saros 131)	November 12, 1947 (Saros 132)	October 12, 1958 (Saros 133)
September 11, 1969 (Saros 134)	August 10, 1980 (Saros 135)	July 11, 1991 (Saros 136)	June 10, 2002 (Saros 137)	May 10, 2013 (Saros 138)
April 8, 2024 (Saros 139)	March 9, 2035 (Saros 140)	February 5, 2046 (Saros 141)	January 5, 2057 (Saros 142)	December 6, 2067 (Saros 143)
November 4, 2078 (Saros 144)	October 4, 2089 (Saros 145)	September 4, 2100 (Saros 146)	August 4, 2111 (Saros 147)	July 4, 2122 (Saros 148)
June 3, 2133 (Saros 149)	May 3, 2144 (Saros 150)	April 2, 2155 (Saros 151)	March 2, 2166 (Saros 152)	January 29, 2177 (Saros 153)
December 29, 2187 (Saros 154)	November 28, 2198 (Saros 155)			

=== Inex series ===
This eclipse is a part of the long period inex cycle, repeating at alternating nodes, every 358 synodic months (≈ 10,571.95 days, or 29 years minus 20 days). Their appearance and longitude are irregular due to a lack of synchronization with the anomalistic month (period of perigee). However, groupings of 3 inex cycles (≈ 87 years minus 2 months) comes close (≈ 1,151.02 anomalistic months), so eclipses are similar in these groupings.

Series members between 1801 and 2200
May 5, 1818 (Saros 135)	April 15, 1847 (Saros 136)	March 25, 1876 (Saros 137)
March 6, 1905 (Saros 138)	February 14, 1934 (Saros 139)	January 25, 1963 (Saros 140)
January 4, 1992 (Saros 141)	December 14, 2020 (Saros 142)	November 25, 2049 (Saros 143)
November 4, 2078 (Saros 144)	October 16, 2107 (Saros 145)	September 26, 2136 (Saros 146)
September 5, 2165 (Saros 147)	August 16, 2194 (Saros 148)	
