= Solar Saros 154 =

Saros cycle series 154 for solar eclipses

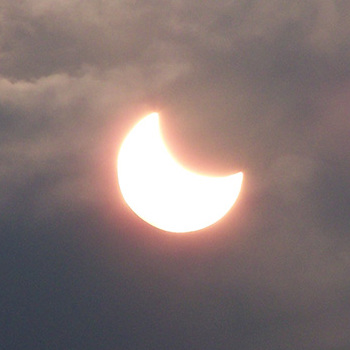
September 11, 2007 Partial from Córdoba, Argentina Series member 6

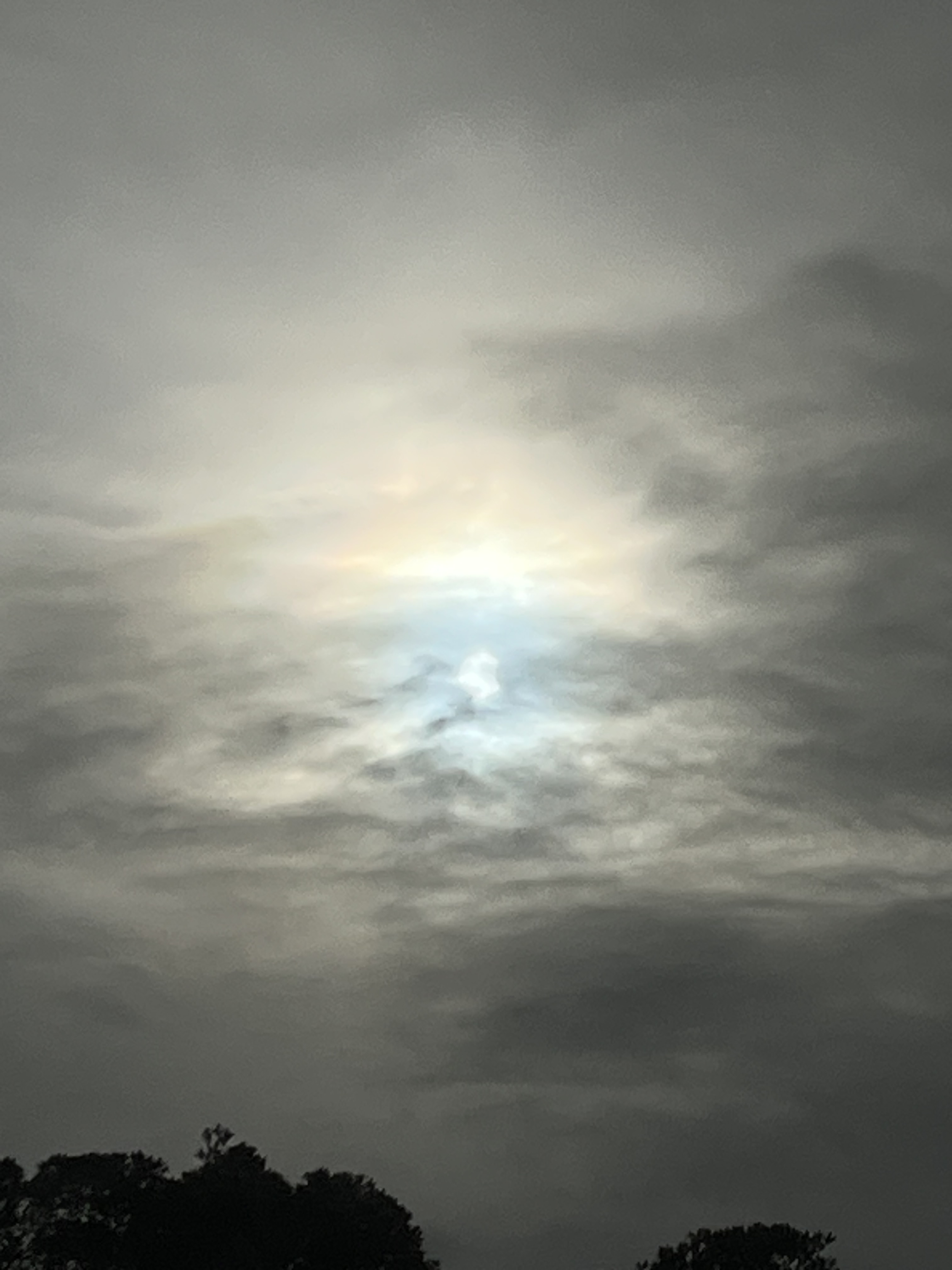
September 21, 2025 Partial from Auckland, New Zealand Series member 7

Animation of the series

Saros cycle series 154 for solar eclipses occurs at the Moon's descending node, repeating every 18 years, 11 days, containing 71 eclipses, 56 of which will be umbral (17 annular, 3 hybrid, 36 total). The first eclipse in the series was on 19 July 1917 and the last eclipse will be on 25 August 3179. The most recent was a partial eclipse on 21 September 2025 and the next will be an annular eclipse on 3 October 2043.

The longest totality will be 4 minutes 50 seconds on 25 July 2530 and the longest annular will be 3 minutes 41 seconds on 13 October 2061. This solar saros is linked to Lunar Saros 147.

== Umbral eclipses ==
Umbral eclipses (annular, total and hybrid) can be further classified as either: 1) Central (two limits), 2) Central (one limit) or 3) Non-Central (one limit). The statistical distribution of these classes in Saros series 154 appears in the following table.

Classification	Number	Percent
All Umbral eclipses	56	100.00%
Central (two limits)	55	98.21%
Central (one limit)	0	0.00%
Non-central (one limit)	1	1.79%

== All eclipses ==
Saros	Member	Date	Time (Greatest) UTC	Type	Location Lat, Long	Gamma	Mag.	Width (km)	Duration (min:sec)	Ref
154	1	July 19, 1917	2:42:42	Partial	63.7S 101.8E	-1.5101	0.0863			
154	2	July 30, 1935	9:16:28	Partial	62.9S 5.9W	-1.4259	0.2315			
154	3	August 9, 1953	15:55:03	Partial	62.2S 114.7W	-1.344	0.3729			
154	4	August 20, 1971	22:39:31	Partial	61.7S 135.4E	-1.2659	0.508			
154	5	August 31, 1989	5:31:47	Partial	61.3S 23.6E	-1.1928	0.6344			
154	6	September 11, 2007	12:32:24	Partial	61S 90.2W	-1.1255	0.7507			
154	7	September 21, 2025	19:43:04	Partial	60.9S 153.5E	-1.0651	0.855			
154	8	October 3, 2043	3:01:49	Annular (Note: Non-central)	61S 35.3E	1.0102	0.9497	-	-	
154	9	October 13, 2061	10:32:10	Annular	62.1S 54.4W	-0.9639	0.9469	743	3m 41s	
154	10	October 24, 2079	18:11:21	Annular	63.4S 160.6W	-0.9243	0.9484	495	3m 39s	
154	11	November 4, 2097	2:01:25	Annular	65.8S 86.8E	-0.8926	0.9494	411	3m 36s	
154	12	November 16, 2115	9:58:55	Annular	68.7S 27.8W	-0.8664	0.9503	365	3m 32s	
154	13	November 26, 2133	18:05:55	Annular	72S 143.5W	-0.8473	0.9513	337	3m 27s	
154	14	December 8, 2151	2:18:31	Annular	75.1S 103.1E	-0.832	0.9526	314	3m 22s	
154	15	December 18, 2169	10:37:07	Annular	77.3S 6.1W	-0.8213	0.9544	295	3m 15s	
154	16	December 29, 2187	18:59:03	Annular	77.7S 111.2W	-0.8126	0.9565	274	3m 7s	
154	17	January 10, 2206	3:24:08	Annular	75.9S 140.5E	-0.806	0.9592	252	2m 57s	
154	18	January 21, 2224	11:48:53	Annular	72.4S 25.2E	-0.7984	0.9626	227	2m 46s	
154	19	January 31, 2242	20:12:58	Annular	67.9S 95.8W	-0.7894	0.9665	197	2m 31s	
154	20	February 12, 2260	4:34:24	Annular	62.7S 140.2E	-0.7776	0.9711	165	2m 15s	
154	21	February 22, 2278	12:52:48	Annular	57.1S 14.8E	-0.7628	0.9762	131	1m 54s	
154	22	March 4, 2296	21:04:46	Annular	51.1S 110.3W	-0.7418	0.9819	95	1m 31s	
154	23	March 17, 2314	5:11:54	Annular	44.9S 125.1E	-0.716	0.988	60	1m 3s	
154	24	March 27, 2332	13:11:34	Annular	38.3S 2E	-0.6831	0.9944	26	0m 30s	
154	25	April 7, 2350	21:06:03	Hybrid	31.7S 119.7W	-0.6452	1.0011	5	0m 6s	
154	26	April 18, 2368	4:51:38	Hybrid	24.8S 120.8E	-0.5992	1.0079	34	0m 47s	
154	27	April 29, 2386	12:32:25	Hybrid (Note: Begins as a total and ends as an annular)	18.1S 2.9E	-0.5483	1.0146	60	1m 30s	
154	28	May 9, 2404	20:05:45	Total	11.4S 112.8W	-0.4902	1.0212	83	2m 14s	
154	29	May 21, 2422	3:34:51	Total	5S 133.1E	-0.4278	1.0275	103	2m 56s	
154	30	May 31, 2440	10:58:15	Total	1N 21E	-0.3598	1.0334	121	3m 33s	
154	31	June 11, 2458	18:19:40	Total	6.3N 90W	-0.2891	1.0388	136	4m 4s	
154	32	June 22, 2476	1:38:29	Total	11.1N 160.4E	-0.2153	1.0435	149	4m 25s	
154	33	July 3, 2494	8:56:16	Total	15N 51.7E	-0.1397	1.0477	160	4m 40s	
154	34	July 14, 2512	16:14:11	Total	18.1N 56.5W	-0.0634	1.051	170	4m 47s	
154	35	July 25, 2530	23:33:49	Total	20.2N 164.6W	0.0124	1.0538	178	4m 50s	
154	36	August 5, 2548	6:56:36	Total	21.4N 86.6E	0.0862	1.0556	184	4m 49s	
154	37	August 16, 2566	14:22:25	Total	21.8N 22.8W	0.1581	1.0569	190	4m 47s	
154	38	August 26, 2584	21:54:18	Total	21.4N 134W	0.2258	1.0573	193	4m 43s	
154	39	September 8, 2602	5:31:32	Total	20.6N 113.3E	0.2895	1.0572	196	4m 39s	
154	40	September 18, 2620	13:15:47	Total	19.4N 1.6W	0.3476	1.0565	198	4m 35s	
154	41	September 29, 2638	21:06:37	Total	18.1N 118.4W	0.4007	1.0554	198	4m 31s	
154	42	October 10, 2656	5:06:01	Total	16.7N 122.2E	0.4468	1.0539	197	4m 28s	
154	43	October 21, 2674	13:13:05	Total	15.4N 0.5E	0.4869	1.0522	196	4m 25s	
154	44	October 31, 2692	21:27:40	Total	14.4N 123.3W	0.5212	1.0503	193	4m 23s	
154	45	November 13, 2710	5:50:18	Total	13.6N 110.5E	0.5489	1.0486	191	4m 20s	
154	46	November 23, 2728	14:20:46	Total	13.1N 17.8W	0.5701	1.0468	188	4m 17s	
154	47	December 4, 2746	22:57:39	Total	13N 147.9W	0.5864	1.0454	186	4m 15s	
154	48	December 15, 2764	7:40:02	Total	13.3N 80.4E	0.5984	1.0443	184	4m 12s	
154	49	December 26, 2782	16:26:47	Total	14.1N 52.4W	0.607	1.0435	183	4m 10s	
154	50	January 6, 2801	1:17:30	Total	15.5N 173.7E	0.6127	1.0432	182	4m 7s	
154	51	January 17, 2819	10:08:37	Total	17.4N 39.6E	0.618	1.0433	184	4m 4s	
154	52	January 27, 2837	19:01:17	Total	20N 95W	0.6223	1.0438	187	4m 2s	
154	53	February 8, 2855	3:51:22	Total	23.2N 131E	0.6288	1.0448	191	4m 0s	
154	54	February 18, 2873	12:39:50	Total	27.1N 2.8W	0.6369	1.0461	198	3m 59s	
154	55	March 1, 2891	21:22:05	Total	31.7N 135.2W	0.6501	1.0477	207	3m 58s	
154	56	March 13, 2909	6:00:58	Total	36.8N 93.1E	0.6663	1.0495	219	3m 56s	
154	57	March 24, 2927	14:32:03	Total	42.6N 36.8W	0.6886	1.0514	233	3m 54s	
154	58	April 3, 2945	22:56:50	Total	49N 165.4W	0.7164	1.0532	251	3m 50s	
154	59	April 15, 2963	7:12:58	Total	55.9N 68E	0.7513	1.0547	273	3m 44s	
154	60	April 25, 2981	15:22:39	Total	63.3N 57.6W	0.7917	1.056	303	3m 36s	
154	61	May 6, 2999	23:23:57	Total	71.5N 177.3E	0.8388	1.0566	345	3m 25s	
154	62	May 18, 3017	7:17:56	Total	80.3N 46.1E	0.8919	1.0564	417	3m 11s	
154	63	May 29, 3035	15:04:56	Total	84.8N 167.7W	0.9507	1.0548	605	2m 50s	
154	64	June 8, 3053	22:46:25	Partial	67.1N 36.8E	1.0142	0.9922			
154	65	June 20, 3071	6:21:51	Partial	66.1N 87.0W	1.0823	0.8613			
154	66	June 30, 3189	13:53:21	Partial	65.2N 150.7E	1.1533	0.7248			
154	67	July 12, 3107	21:21:18	Partial	64.3N 29.6E	1.2269	0.5833			
154	68	July 23, 3125	4:47:58	Partial	63.5N 90.9W	1.3012	0.4409			
154	69	August 3, 3143	12:11:53	Partial	62.8N 149.6E	1.3771	0.2960			
154	70	August 13, 3161	19:37:05	Partial	62.2N 29.9E	1.4513	0.1553			
154	71	August 25, 3179	3:02:28	Partial	61.8N 89.7W	1.5246	0.0173			
