= Solar eclipse of August 10, 1915 =

20th-century annular solar eclipse

- Annular eclipse
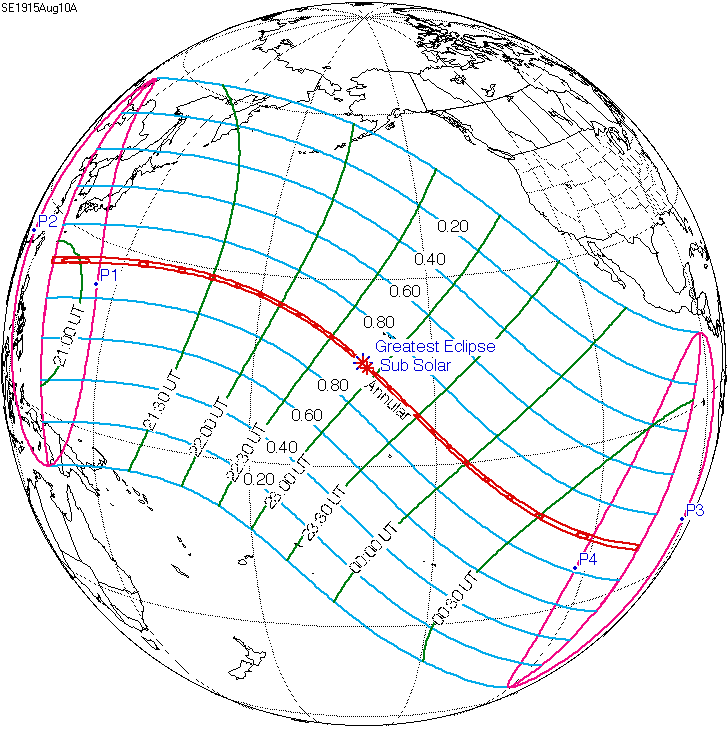
- Map
- Gamma: 0.0124
- Magnitude: 0.9853

Maximum eclipse
- Duration: 93 s (1 min 33 s)
- Coordinates: 16.4°N 161.4°W
- Max. width of band: 52 km (32 mi)

Times (UTC)
- Greatest eclipse: 22:52:25

References
- Saros: 134 (38 of 71)
- Catalog # (SE5000): 9316

An annular solar eclipse occurred at the Moon's descending node of orbit between Tuesday, August 10 and Wednesday, August 11, 1915, with a magnitude of 0.9853. A solar eclipse occurs when the Moon passes between Earth and the Sun, thereby totally or partly obscuring the image of the Sun for a viewer on Earth. An annular solar eclipse occurs when the Moon's apparent diameter is smaller than the Sun's, blocking most of the Sun's light and causing the Sun to look like an annulus (ring). An annular eclipse appears as a partial eclipse over a region of the Earth thousands of kilometres wide. Occurring 5.8 days after apogee (on August 5, 1915, at 2:40 UTC), the Moon's apparent diameter was smaller.

Annularity was visible from the Pacific Ocean, with the only land being Haha-jima Group in Japan, where the eclipse occurred on August 11 because it is west of International Date Line. A partial eclipse was visible for parts of Northeast Asia, northern Oceania, and Hawaii.

== Eclipse details ==
Shown below are two tables displaying details about this particular solar eclipse. The first table outlines times at which the Moon's penumbra or umbra attains the specific parameter, and the second table describes various other parameters pertaining to this eclipse.

August 10, 1915 Solar Eclipse Times
Event	Time (UTC)
First Penumbral External Contact	1915 August 10 at 19:56:16.8 UTC
First Umbral External Contact	1915 August 10 at 20:58:11.2 UTC
First Central Line	1915 August 10 at 20:59:11.3 UTC
Greatest Duration	1915 August 10 at 20:59:11.3 UTC
First Umbral Internal Contact	1915 August 10 at 21:00:11.3 UTC
First Penumbral Internal Contact	1915 August 10 at 22:02:04.6 UTC
Equatorial Conjunction	1915 August 10 at 22:51:48.2 UTC
Ecliptic Conjunction	1915 August 10 at 22:52:16.2 UTC
Greatest Eclipse	1915 August 10 at 22:52:24.5 UTC
Last Penumbral Internal Contact	1915 August 10 at 23:42:46.5 UTC
Last Umbral Internal Contact	1915 August 11 at 00:44:40.1 UTC
Last Central Line	1915 August 11 at 00:45:37.4 UTC
Last Umbral External Contact	1915 August 11 at 00:46:34.7 UTC
Last Penumbral External Contact	1915 August 11 at 01:48:26.3 UTC

August 10, 1915 Solar Eclipse Parameters
Parameter	Value
Eclipse Magnitude	0.98528
Eclipse Obscuration	0.97078
Gamma	0.01237
Sun Right Ascension	09h18m36.8s
Sun Declination	+15°41'16.7"
Sun Semi-Diameter	15'46.8"
Sun Equatorial Horizontal Parallax	08.7"
Moon Right Ascension	09h18m37.9s
Moon Declination	+15°41'54.9"
Moon Semi-Diameter	15'18.4"
Moon Equatorial Horizontal Parallax	0°56'10.4"
ΔT	17.8 s

== Eclipse season ==
This eclipse is part of an eclipse season, a period, roughly every six months, when eclipses occur. Only two (or occasionally three) eclipse seasons occur each year, and each season lasts about 35 days and repeats just short of six months (173 days) later; thus two full eclipse seasons always occur each year. Either two or three eclipses happen each eclipse season. In the sequence below, each eclipse is separated by a fortnight. The first and last eclipse in this sequence is separated by one synodic month.

Eclipse season of July–August 1915
July 26 Ascending node (full moon)	August 10 Descending node (new moon)	August 24 Ascending node (full moon)
Penumbral lunar eclipse Lunar Saros 108	Annular solar eclipse Solar Saros 134	Penumbral lunar eclipse Lunar Saros 146

== Related eclipses ==
=== Eclipses in 1915 ===
- A penumbral lunar eclipse on January 31.
- An annular solar eclipse on February 14.
- A penumbral lunar eclipse on March 1.
- A penumbral lunar eclipse on July 26.
- An annular solar eclipse on August 10.
- A penumbral lunar eclipse on August 24.

=== Metonic ===
- Preceded by: Solar eclipse of October 22, 1911
- Followed by: Solar eclipse of May 29, 1919

=== Tzolkinex ===
- Preceded by: Solar eclipse of June 28, 1908
- Followed by: Solar eclipse of September 21, 1922

=== Half-Saros ===
- Preceded by: Lunar eclipse of August 4, 1906
- Followed by: Lunar eclipse of August 14, 1924

=== Tritos ===
- Preceded by: Solar eclipse of September 9, 1904
- Followed by: Solar eclipse of July 9, 1926

=== Solar Saros 134 ===
- Preceded by: Solar eclipse of July 29, 1897
- Followed by: Solar eclipse of August 21, 1933

=== Inex ===
- Preceded by: Solar eclipse of August 29, 1886
- Followed by: Solar eclipse of July 20, 1944

=== Triad ===
- Preceded by: Solar eclipse of October 9, 1828
- Followed by: Solar eclipse of June 10, 2002

=== Solar eclipses of 1913–1917 ===
This eclipse is a member of a semester series. An eclipse in a semester series of solar eclipses repeats approximately every 177 days and 4 hours (a semester) at alternating nodes of the Moon's orbit.

The partial solar eclipses on April 6, 1913 and September 30, 1913 occur in the previous lunar year eclipse set, and the solar eclipses on December 24, 1916 (partial), June 19, 1917 (partial), and December 14, 1917 (annular) occur in the next lunar year eclipse set.

Solar eclipse series sets from 1913 to 1917
Descending node			Ascending node		
Saros	Map	Gamma	Saros	Map	Gamma
114	August 31, 1913 Partial	1.4512	119	February 25, 1914 Annular	−0.9416
124	August 21, 1914 Total	0.7655	129	February 14, 1915 Annular	−0.2024
134	August 10, 1915 Annular	0.0124	139	February 3, 1916 Total	0.4987
144	July 30, 1916 Annular	−0.7709	149	January 23, 1917 Partial	1.1508
154	July 19, 1917 Partial	−1.5101			

=== Saros 134 ===
This eclipse is a part of Saros series 134, repeating every 18 years, 11 days, and containing 71 events. The series started with a partial solar eclipse on June 22, 1248. It contains total eclipses from October 9, 1428 through December 24, 1554; hybrid eclipses from January 3, 1573 through June 27, 1843; and annular eclipses from July 8, 1861 through May 21, 2384. The series ends at member 72 as a partial eclipse on August 6, 2510. Its eclipses are tabulated in three columns; every third eclipse in the same column is one exeligmos apart, so they all cast shadows over approximately the same parts of the Earth.

The longest duration of totality was produced by member 11 at 1 minutes, 30 seconds on October 9, 1428, and the longest duration of annularity will be produced by member 52 at 10 minutes, 55 seconds on January 10, 2168. All eclipses in this series occur at the Moon’s descending node of orbit.

Series members 32–53 occur between 1801 and 2200:
32	33	34
June 6, 1807	June 16, 1825	June 27, 1843
35	36	37
July 8, 1861	July 19, 1879	July 29, 1897
38	39	40
August 10, 1915	August 21, 1933	September 1, 1951
41	42	43
September 11, 1969	September 23, 1987	October 3, 2005
44	45	46
October 14, 2023	October 25, 2041	November 5, 2059
47	48	49
November 15, 2077	November 27, 2095	December 8, 2113
50	51	52
December 19, 2131	December 30, 2149	January 10, 2168
53
January 20, 2186

=== Metonic series ===
The metonic series repeats eclipses every 19 years (6939.69 days), lasting about 5 cycles. Eclipses occur in nearly the same calendar date. In addition, the octon subseries repeats 1/5 of that or every 3.8 years (1387.94 days). All eclipses in this table occur at the Moon's descending node.

22 eclipse events between March 16, 1866 and August 9, 1953
March 16–17	January 1–3	October 20–22	August 9–10	May 27–29
108	110	112	114	116
March 16, 1866			August 9, 1877	May 27, 1881
118	120	122	124	126
March 16, 1885	January 1, 1889	October 20, 1892	August 9, 1896	May 28, 1900
128	130	132	134	136
March 17, 1904	January 3, 1908	October 22, 1911	August 10, 1915	May 29, 1919
138	140	142	144	146
March 17, 1923	January 3, 1927	October 21, 1930	August 10, 1934	May 29, 1938
148	150	152	154	
March 16, 1942	January 3, 1946	October 21, 1949	August 9, 1953	

=== Tritos series ===
This eclipse is a part of a tritos cycle, repeating at alternating nodes every 135 synodic months (≈ 3986.63 days, or 11 years minus 1 month). Their appearance and longitude are irregular due to a lack of synchronization with the anomalistic month (period of perigee), but groupings of 3 tritos cycles (≈ 33 years minus 3 months) come close (≈ 434.044 anomalistic months), so eclipses are similar in these groupings.

Series members between 1801 and 2200
June 16, 1806 (Saros 124)	May 16, 1817 (Saros 125)	April 14, 1828 (Saros 126)	March 15, 1839 (Saros 127)	February 12, 1850 (Saros 128)
January 11, 1861 (Saros 129)	December 12, 1871 (Saros 130)	November 10, 1882 (Saros 131)	October 9, 1893 (Saros 132)	September 9, 1904 (Saros 133)
August 10, 1915 (Saros 134)	July 9, 1926 (Saros 135)	June 8, 1937 (Saros 136)	May 9, 1948 (Saros 137)	April 8, 1959 (Saros 138)
March 7, 1970 (Saros 139)	February 4, 1981 (Saros 140)	January 4, 1992 (Saros 141)	December 4, 2002 (Saros 142)	November 3, 2013 (Saros 143)
October 2, 2024 (Saros 144)	September 2, 2035 (Saros 145)	August 2, 2046 (Saros 146)	July 1, 2057 (Saros 147)	May 31, 2068 (Saros 148)
May 1, 2079 (Saros 149)	March 31, 2090 (Saros 150)	February 28, 2101 (Saros 151)	January 29, 2112 (Saros 152)	December 28, 2122 (Saros 153)
November 26, 2133 (Saros 154)	October 26, 2144 (Saros 155)	September 26, 2155 (Saros 156)	August 25, 2166 (Saros 157)	July 25, 2177 (Saros 158)
June 24, 2188 (Saros 159)	May 24, 2199 (Saros 160)			

=== Inex series ===
This eclipse is a part of the long period inex cycle, repeating at alternating nodes, every 358 synodic months (≈ 10,571.95 days, or 29 years minus 20 days). Their appearance and longitude are irregular due to a lack of synchronization with the anomalistic month (period of perigee). However, groupings of 3 inex cycles (≈ 87 years minus 2 months) comes close (≈ 1,151.02 anomalistic months), so eclipses are similar in these groupings.

Series members between 1801 and 2200
October 9, 1828 (Saros 131)	September 18, 1857 (Saros 132)	August 29, 1886 (Saros 133)
August 10, 1915 (Saros 134)	July 20, 1944 (Saros 135)	June 30, 1973 (Saros 136)
June 10, 2002 (Saros 137)	May 21, 2031 (Saros 138)	April 30, 2060 (Saros 139)
April 10, 2089 (Saros 140)	March 22, 2118 (Saros 141)	March 2, 2147 (Saros 142)
February 10, 2176 (Saros 143)		
