= Solar eclipse of October 24, 2079 =

Future annular solar eclipse

- Annular eclipse
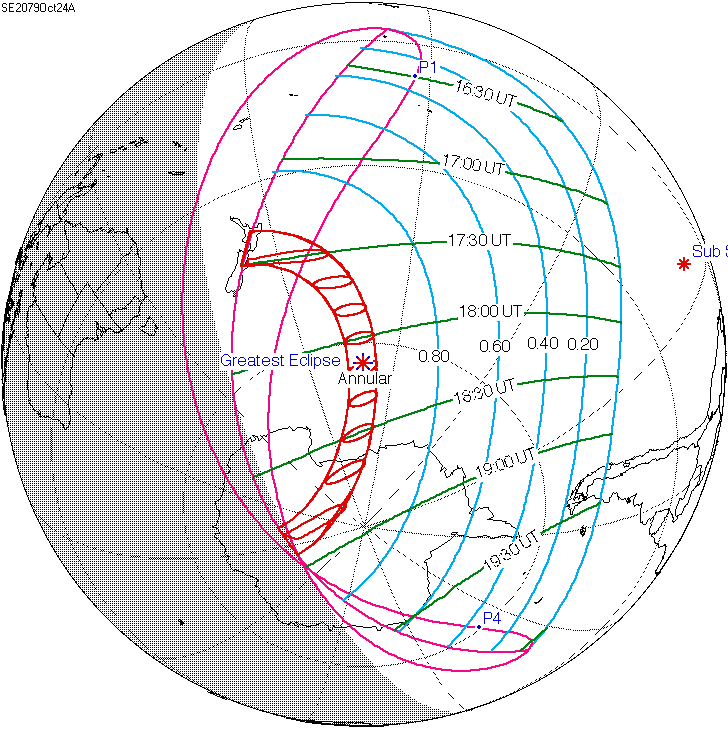
- Map
- Gamma: −0.9243
- Magnitude: 0.9484

Maximum eclipse
- Duration: 219 s (3 min 39 s)
- Coordinates: 63.4°S 160.6°W
- Max. width of band: 495 km (308 mi)

Times (UTC)
- Greatest eclipse: 18:11:21

References
- Saros: 154 (10 of 71)
- Catalog # (SE5000): 9686

An annular solar eclipse will occur at the Moon's descending node of orbit on Tuesday, October 24, 2079, with a magnitude of 0.9484. A solar eclipse occurs when the Moon passes between Earth and the Sun, thereby totally or partly obscuring the image of the Sun for a viewer on Earth. An annular solar eclipse occurs when the Moon's apparent diameter is smaller than the Sun's, blocking most of the Sun's light and causing the Sun to look like an annulus (ring). An annular eclipse appears as a partial eclipse over a region of the Earth thousands of kilometres wide. Occurring about 5.25 days before apogee (on October 29, 2079, at 23:40 UTC), the Moon's apparent diameter will be smaller.

The path of annularity will be visible from parts of New Zealand and Antarctica. A partial solar eclipse will also be visible for parts of Oceania, Antarctica, and southern South America.

== Eclipse details ==
Shown below are two tables displaying details about this particular solar eclipse. The first table outlines times at which the Moon's penumbra or umbra attains the specific parameter, and the second table describes various other parameters pertaining to this eclipse.

October 24, 2079 Solar Eclipse Times
Event	Time (UTC)
First Penumbral External Contact	2079 October 24 at 15:46:43.1 UTC
First Umbral External Contact	2079 October 24 at 17:23:08.2 UTC
First Central Line	2079 October 24 at 17:27:57.3 UTC
First Umbral Internal Contact	2079 October 24 at 17:33:17.9 UTC
Greatest Eclipse	2079 October 24 at 18:11:21.4 UTC
Greatest Duration	2079 October 24 at 18:17:56.4 UTC
Ecliptic Conjunction	2079 October 24 at 18:21:55.5 UTC
Last Umbral Internal Contact	2079 October 24 at 18:48:49.3 UTC
Last Central Line	2079 October 24 at 18:54:13.2 UTC
Last Umbral External Contact	2079 October 24 at 18:59:05.8 UTC
Equatorial Conjunction	2079 October 24 at 19:03:01.0 UTC
Last Penumbral External Contact	2079 October 24 at 20:35:44.7 UTC

October 24, 2079 Solar Eclipse Parameters
Parameter	Value
Eclipse Magnitude	0.94843
Eclipse Obscuration	0.89952
Gamma	−0.92426
Sun Right Ascension	13h57m22.1s
Sun Declination	-11°59'23.6"
Sun Semi-Diameter	16'04.6"
Sun Equatorial Horizontal Parallax	08.8"
Moon Right Ascension	13h55m50.0s
Moon Declination	-12°45'30.1"
Moon Semi-Diameter	15'09.9"
Moon Equatorial Horizontal Parallax	0°55'39.3"
ΔT	105.3 s

== Eclipse season ==
This eclipse is part of an eclipse season, a period, roughly every six months, when eclipses occur. Only two (or occasionally three) eclipse seasons occur each year, and each season lasts about 35 days and repeats just short of six months (173 days) later; thus two full eclipse seasons always occur each year. Either two or three eclipses happen each eclipse season. In the sequence below, each eclipse is separated by a fortnight.

Eclipse season of October 2079
October 10 Ascending node (full moon)	October 24 Descending node (new moon)
Total lunar eclipse Lunar Saros 128	Annular solar eclipse Solar Saros 154

== Related eclipses ==
=== Eclipses in 2079 ===
- A partial lunar eclipse on April 16.
- A total solar eclipse on May 1.
- A total lunar eclipse on October 10.
- An annular solar eclipse on October 24.

=== Metonic ===
- Preceded by: Solar eclipse of January 6, 2076
- Followed by: Solar eclipse of August 13, 2083

=== Tzolkinex ===
- Preceded by: Solar eclipse of September 12, 2072
- Followed by: Solar eclipse of December 6, 2086

=== Half-Saros ===
- Preceded by: Lunar eclipse of October 19, 2070
- Followed by: Lunar eclipse of October 30, 2088

=== Tritos ===
- Preceded by: Solar eclipse of November 24, 2068
- Followed by: Solar eclipse of September 23, 2090

=== Solar Saros 154 ===
- Preceded by: Solar eclipse of October 13, 2061
- Followed by: Solar eclipse of November 4, 2097

=== Inex ===
- Preceded by: Solar eclipse of November 14, 2050
- Followed by: Solar eclipse of October 4, 2108

=== Triad ===
- Preceded by: Solar eclipse of December 24, 1992
- Followed by: Solar eclipse of August 25, 2166

=== Solar eclipses of 2076–2079 ===
This eclipse is a member of a semester series. An eclipse in a semester series of solar eclipses repeats approximately every 177 days and 4 hours (a semester) at alternating nodes of the Moon's orbit.

The partial solar eclipses on January 6, 2076 and July 1, 2076 occur in the previous lunar year eclipse set.

Solar eclipse series sets from 2076 to 2079
Ascending node			Descending node		
Saros	Map	Gamma	Saros	Map	Gamma
119	June 1, 2076 Partial	−1.3897	124	November 26, 2076 Partial	1.1401
129	May 22, 2077 Total	−0.5725	134	November 15, 2077 Annular	0.4705
139	May 11, 2078 Total	0.1838	144	November 4, 2078 Annular	−0.2285
149	May 1, 2079 Total	0.9081	154	October 24, 2079 Annular	−0.9243

=== Saros 154 ===
This eclipse is a part of Saros series 154, repeating every 18 years, 11 days, and containing 71 events. The series started with a partial solar eclipse on July 19, 1917. It contains annular eclipses from October 3, 2043, through March 27, 2332; hybrid eclipses from April 7, 2350 through April 29, 2386; and total eclipses from May 9, 2404 through May 29, 3035. The series ends at member 71 as a partial eclipse on August 25, 3179. Its eclipses are tabulated in three columns; every third eclipse in the same column is one exeligmos apart, so they all cast shadows over approximately the same parts of the Earth.

The longest duration of annularity will be produced by member 9 at 3 minutes, 41 seconds on October 13, 2061, and the longest duration of totality will be produced by member 35 at 4 minutes, 50 seconds on July 25, 2530. All eclipses in this series occur at the Moon’s descending node of orbit.

Series members 1–16 occur between 1917 and 2200:
1	2	3
July 19, 1917	July 30, 1935	August 9, 1953
4	5	6
August 20, 1971	August 31, 1989	September 11, 2007
7	8	9
September 21, 2025	October 3, 2043	October 13, 2061
10	11	12
October 24, 2079	November 4, 2097	November 16, 2115
13	14	15
November 26, 2133	December 8, 2151	December 18, 2169
16
December 29, 2187

=== Metonic series ===
The metonic series repeats eclipses every 19 years (6939.69 days), lasting about 5 cycles. Eclipses occur in nearly the same calendar date. In addition, the octon subseries repeats 1/5 of that or every 3.8 years (1387.94 days). All eclipses in this table occur at the Moon's descending node.

22 eclipse events between June 1, 2011 and October 24, 2098
May 31–June 1	March 19–20	January 5–6	October 24–25	August 12–13
118	120	122	124	126
June 1, 2011	March 20, 2015	January 6, 2019	October 25, 2022	August 12, 2026
128	130	132	134	136
June 1, 2030	March 20, 2034	January 5, 2038	October 25, 2041	August 12, 2045
138	140	142	144	146
May 31, 2049	March 20, 2053	January 5, 2057	October 24, 2060	August 12, 2064
148	150	152	154	156
May 31, 2068	March 19, 2072	January 6, 2076	October 24, 2079	August 13, 2083
158	160	162	164	
June 1, 2087			October 24, 2098	

=== Tritos series ===
This eclipse is a part of a tritos cycle, repeating at alternating nodes every 135 synodic months (≈ 3986.63 days, or 11 years minus 1 month). Their appearance and longitude are irregular due to a lack of synchronization with the anomalistic month (period of perigee), but groupings of 3 tritos cycles (≈ 33 years minus 3 months) come close (≈ 434.044 anomalistic months), so eclipses are similar in these groupings.

The partial solar eclipses on December 18, 2188 (part of Saros 164) and November 18, 2199 (part of Saros 165) are also a part of this series but are not included in the table below.

Series members between 1801 and 2134
December 10, 1806 (Saros 129)	November 9, 1817 (Saros 130)	October 9, 1828 (Saros 131)	September 7, 1839 (Saros 132)	August 7, 1850 (Saros 133)
July 8, 1861 (Saros 134)	June 6, 1872 (Saros 135)	May 6, 1883 (Saros 136)	April 6, 1894 (Saros 137)	March 6, 1905 (Saros 138)
February 3, 1916 (Saros 139)	January 3, 1927 (Saros 140)	December 2, 1937 (Saros 141)	November 1, 1948 (Saros 142)	October 2, 1959 (Saros 143)
August 31, 1970 (Saros 144)	July 31, 1981 (Saros 145)	June 30, 1992 (Saros 146)	May 31, 2003 (Saros 147)	April 29, 2014 (Saros 148)
March 29, 2025 (Saros 149)	February 27, 2036 (Saros 150)	January 26, 2047 (Saros 151)	December 26, 2057 (Saros 152)	November 24, 2068 (Saros 153)
October 24, 2079 (Saros 154)	September 23, 2090 (Saros 155)	August 24, 2101 (Saros 156)	July 23, 2112 (Saros 157)	June 23, 2123 (Saros 158)
May 23, 2134 (Saros 159)

=== Inex series ===
This eclipse is a part of the long period inex cycle, repeating at alternating nodes, every 358 synodic months (≈ 10,571.95 days, or 29 years minus 20 days). Their appearance and longitude are irregular due to a lack of synchronization with the anomalistic month (period of perigee). However, groupings of 3 inex cycles (≈ 87 years minus 2 months) comes close (≈ 1,151.02 anomalistic months), so eclipses are similar in these groupings.

Series members between 1801 and 2200
April 24, 1819 (Saros 145)	April 3, 1848 (Saros 146)	March 15, 1877 (Saros 147)
February 23, 1906 (Saros 148)	February 3, 1935 (Saros 149)	January 14, 1964 (Saros 150)
December 24, 1992 (Saros 151)	December 4, 2021 (Saros 152)	November 14, 2050 (Saros 153)
October 24, 2079 (Saros 154)	October 5, 2108 (Saros 155)	September 15, 2137 (Saros 156)
August 25, 2166 (Saros 157)	August 5, 2195 (Saros 158)	
