= Solar eclipse of August 20, 1971 =

20th-century partial solar eclipse

- Partial eclipse
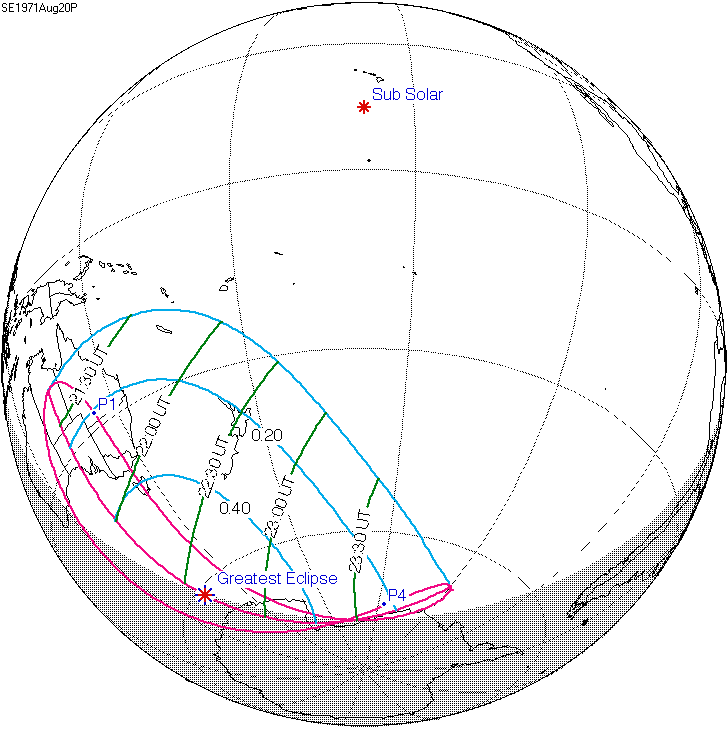
- Map
- Gamma: −1.2659
- Magnitude: 0.508

Maximum eclipse
- Coordinates: 61.7°S 135.4°E

Times (UTC)
- Greatest eclipse: 22:39:31

References
- Saros: 154 (4 of 71)
- Catalog # (SE5000): 9445

A partial solar eclipse occurred at the Moon's descending node of orbit between Friday, August 20 and Saturday, August 21, 1971, with a magnitude of 0.508. A solar eclipse occurs when the Moon passes between Earth and the Sun, thereby totally or partly obscuring the image of the Sun for a viewer on Earth. A partial solar eclipse occurs in the polar regions of the Earth when the center of the Moon's shadow misses the Earth.

A partial eclipse was visible for parts of Australia, Oceania, and Antarctica.

== Eclipse details ==
Shown below are two tables displaying details about this particular solar eclipse. The first table outlines times at which the Moon's penumbra or umbra attains the specific parameter, and the second table describes various other parameters pertaining to this eclipse.

August 20, 1971 Solar Eclipse Times
Event	Time (UTC)
First Penumbral External Contact	1971 August 20 at 20:52:59.2 UTC
Greatest Eclipse	1971 August 20 at 22:39:31.5 UTC
Ecliptic Conjunction	1971 August 20 at 22:54:02.4 UTC
Equatorial Conjunction	1971 August 20 at 23:50:24.9 UTC
Last Penumbral External Contact	1971 August 21 at 00:25:39.4 UTC

August 20, 1971 Solar Eclipse Parameters
Parameter	Value
Eclipse Magnitude	0.50797
Eclipse Obscuration	0.39282
Gamma	−1.26591
Sun Right Ascension	09h57m48.0s
Sun Declination	+12°25'50.7"
Sun Semi-Diameter	15'48.4"
Sun Equatorial Horizontal Parallax	08.7"
Moon Right Ascension	09h55m45.7s
Moon Declination	+11°23'25.4"
Moon Semi-Diameter	14'56.3"
Moon Equatorial Horizontal Parallax	0°54'49.4"
ΔT	41.8 s

== Eclipse season ==
This eclipse is part of an eclipse season, a period, roughly every six months, when eclipses occur. Only two (or occasionally three) eclipse seasons occur each year, and each season lasts about 35 days and repeats just short of six months (173 days) later; thus two full eclipse seasons always occur each year. Either two or three eclipses happen each eclipse season. In the sequence below, each eclipse is separated by a fortnight. The first and last eclipse in this sequence is separated by one synodic month.

Eclipse season of July–August 1971
July 22 Descending node (new moon)	August 6 Ascending node (full moon)	August 20 Descending node (new moon)
Partial solar eclipse Solar Saros 116	Total lunar eclipse Lunar Saros 128	Partial solar eclipse Solar Saros 154

== Related eclipses ==
=== Eclipses in 1971 ===
- A total lunar eclipse on February 10.
- A partial solar eclipse on February 25.
- A partial solar eclipse on July 22.
- A total lunar eclipse on August 6.
- A partial solar eclipse on August 20.

=== Metonic ===
- Preceded by: Solar eclipse of November 2, 1967

=== Tzolkinex ===
- Preceded by: Solar eclipse of July 9, 1964
- Followed by: Solar eclipse of October 2, 1978

=== Half-Saros ===
- Preceded by: Lunar eclipse of August 15, 1962
- Followed by: Lunar eclipse of August 26, 1980

=== Tritos ===
- Preceded by: Solar eclipse of September 20, 1960
- Followed by: Solar eclipse of July 20, 1982

=== Solar Saros 154 ===
- Preceded by: Solar eclipse of August 9, 1953
- Followed by: Solar eclipse of August 31, 1989

=== Inex ===
- Preceded by: Solar eclipse of September 10, 1942
- Followed by: Solar eclipse of July 31, 2000

=== Triad ===
- Preceded by: Solar eclipse of October 19, 1884
- Followed by: Solar eclipse of June 21, 2058

=== Solar eclipses of 1968–1971 ===
This eclipse is a member of a semester series. An eclipse in a semester series of solar eclipses repeats approximately every 177 days and 4 hours (a semester) at alternating nodes of the Moon's orbit.

The partial solar eclipse on July 22, 1971 occurs in the next lunar year eclipse set.

Solar eclipse series sets from 1968 to 1971
Ascending node			Descending node		
Saros	Map	Gamma	Saros	Map	Gamma
119	March 28, 1968 Partial	−1.037	124	September 22, 1968 Total	0.9451
129	March 18, 1969 Annular	−0.2704	134	September 11, 1969 Annular	0.2201
139 Totality in Williamston, NC; USA	March 7, 1970 Total	0.4473	144	August 31, 1970 Annular	−0.5364
149	February 25, 1971 Partial	1.1188	154	August 20, 1971 Partial	−1.2659

=== Saros 154 ===
This eclipse is a part of Saros series 154, repeating every 18 years, 11 days, and containing 71 events. The series started with a partial solar eclipse on July 19, 1917. It contains annular eclipses from October 3, 2043, through March 27, 2332; hybrid eclipses from April 7, 2350 through April 29, 2386; and total eclipses from May 9, 2404 through May 29, 3035. The series ends at member 71 as a partial eclipse on August 25, 3179. Its eclipses are tabulated in three columns; every third eclipse in the same column is one exeligmos apart, so they all cast shadows over approximately the same parts of the Earth.

The longest duration of annularity will be produced by member 9 at 3 minutes, 41 seconds on October 13, 2061, and the longest duration of totality will be produced by member 35 at 4 minutes, 50 seconds on July 25, 2530. All eclipses in this series occur at the Moon’s descending node of orbit.

Series members 1–16 occur between 1917 and 2200:
1	2	3
July 19, 1917	July 30, 1935	August 9, 1953
4	5	6
August 20, 1971	August 31, 1989	September 11, 2007
7	8	9
September 21, 2025	October 3, 2043	October 13, 2061
10	11	12
October 24, 2079	November 4, 2097	November 16, 2115
13	14	15
November 26, 2133	December 8, 2151	December 18, 2169
16
December 29, 2187

=== Metonic series ===
The metonic series repeats eclipses every 19 years (6939.69 days), lasting about 5 cycles. Eclipses occur in nearly the same calendar date. In addition, the octon subseries repeats 1/5 of that or every 3.8 years (1387.94 days). All eclipses in this table occur at the Moon's descending node.

22 eclipse events between March 27, 1884 and August 20, 1971
March 27–29	January 14	November 1–2	August 20–21	June 8
108	110	112	114	116
March 27, 1884			August 20, 1895	June 8, 1899
118	120	122	124	126
March 29, 1903	January 14, 1907	November 2, 1910	August 21, 1914	June 8, 1918
128	130	132	134	136
March 28, 1922	January 14, 1926	November 1, 1929	August 21, 1933	June 8, 1937
138	140	142	144	146
March 27, 1941	January 14, 1945	November 1, 1948	August 20, 1952	June 8, 1956
148	150	152	154	
March 27, 1960	January 14, 1964	November 2, 1967	August 20, 1971	

=== Tritos series ===
This eclipse is a part of a tritos cycle, repeating at alternating nodes every 135 synodic months (≈ 3986.63 days, or 11 years minus 1 month). Their appearance and longitude are irregular due to a lack of synchronization with the anomalistic month (period of perigee), but groupings of 3 tritos cycles (≈ 33 years minus 3 months) come close (≈ 434.044 anomalistic months), so eclipses are similar in these groupings.

Series members between 1801 and 1982
November 29, 1807 (Saros 139)	October 29, 1818 (Saros 140)	September 28, 1829 (Saros 141)	August 27, 1840 (Saros 142)	July 28, 1851 (Saros 143)
June 27, 1862 (Saros 144)	May 26, 1873 (Saros 145)	April 25, 1884 (Saros 146)	March 26, 1895 (Saros 147)	February 23, 1906 (Saros 148)
January 23, 1917 (Saros 149)	December 24, 1927 (Saros 150)	November 21, 1938 (Saros 151)	October 21, 1949 (Saros 152)	September 20, 1960 (Saros 153)
August 20, 1971 (Saros 154)	July 20, 1982 (Saros 155)			

=== Inex series ===
This eclipse is a part of the long period inex cycle, repeating at alternating nodes, every 358 synodic months (≈ 10,571.95 days, or 29 years minus 20 days). Their appearance and longitude are irregular due to a lack of synchronization with the anomalistic month (period of perigee). However, groupings of 3 inex cycles (≈ 87 years minus 2 months) comes close (≈ 1,151.02 anomalistic months), so eclipses are similar in these groupings.

Series members between 1801 and 2200
November 29, 1826 (Saros 149)	November 9, 1855 (Saros 150)	October 19, 1884 (Saros 151)
September 30, 1913 (Saros 152)	September 10, 1942 (Saros 153)	August 20, 1971 (Saros 154)
July 31, 2000 (Saros 155)	July 11, 2029 (Saros 156)	June 21, 2058 (Saros 157)
June 1, 2087 (Saros 158)		
April 1, 2174 (Saros 161)		
