= Solar eclipse of August 9, 1953 =

20th-century partial solar eclipse

- Partial eclipse
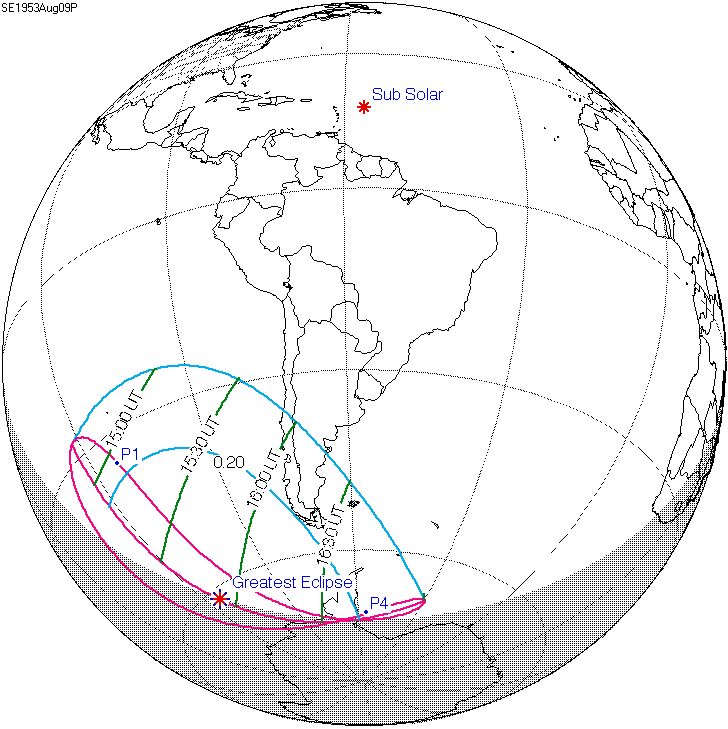
- Map
- Gamma: −1.344
- Magnitude: 0.3729

Maximum eclipse
- Coordinates: 62.2°S 114.7°W

Times (UTC)
- Greatest eclipse: 15:55:03

References
- Saros: 154 (3 of 71)
- Catalog # (SE5000): 9405

A partial solar eclipse occurred at the Moon's descending node of orbit on Sunday, August 9, 1953, with a magnitude of 0.3729. A solar eclipse occurs when the Moon passes between Earth and the Sun, thereby totally or partly obscuring the image of the Sun for a viewer on Earth. A partial solar eclipse occurs in the polar regions of the Earth when the center of the Moon's shadow misses the Earth.

A partial eclipse was visible for parts of Antarctica and extreme southern South America.

== Eclipse details ==
Shown below are two tables displaying details about this particular solar eclipse. The first table outlines times at which the Moon's penumbra or umbra attains the specific parameter, and the second table describes various other parameters pertaining to this eclipse.

August 9, 1953 Solar Eclipse Times
Event	Time (UTC)
First Penumbral External Contact	1953 August 9 at 14:22:15.1 UTC
Greatest Eclipse	1953 August 9 at 15:55:02.5 UTC
Ecliptic Conjunction	1953 August 9 at 16:10:26.5 UTC
Equatorial Conjunction	1953 August 9 at 17:02:08.4 UTC
Last Penumbral External Contact	1953 August 9 at 17:27:26.5 UTC

August 9, 1953 Solar Eclipse Parameters
Parameter	Value
Eclipse Magnitude	0.37289
Eclipse Obscuration	0.25324
Gamma	−1.34403
Sun Right Ascension	09h16m48.0s
Sun Declination	+15°49'20.1"
Sun Semi-Diameter	15'46.7"
Sun Equatorial Horizontal Parallax	08.7"
Moon Right Ascension	09h14m48.9s
Moon Declination	+14°41'52.0"
Moon Semi-Diameter	14'54.3"
Moon Equatorial Horizontal Parallax	0°54'42.1"
ΔT	30.6 s

== Eclipse season ==
This eclipse is part of an eclipse season, a period, roughly every six months, when eclipses occur. Only two (or occasionally three) eclipse seasons occur each year, and each season lasts about 35 days and repeats just short of six months (173 days) later; thus two full eclipse seasons always occur each year. Either two or three eclipses happen each eclipse season. In the sequence below, each eclipse is separated by a fortnight.

Eclipse season of July–August 1953
July 11 Descending node (new moon)	July 26 Ascending node (full moon)	August 9 Descending node (new moon)
Partial solar eclipse Solar Saros 116	Total lunar eclipse Lunar Saros 128	Partial solar eclipse Solar Saros 154

== Related eclipses ==
=== Eclipses in 1953 ===
- A total lunar eclipse on January 29.
- A partial solar eclipse on February 14.
- A partial solar eclipse on July 11.
- A total lunar eclipse on July 26.
- A partial solar eclipse on August 9.

=== Metonic ===
- Preceded by: Solar eclipse of October 21, 1949

=== Tzolkinex ===
- Preceded by: Solar eclipse of June 29, 1946
- Followed by: Solar eclipse of September 20, 1960

=== Half-Saros ===
- Preceded by: Lunar eclipse of August 4, 1944
- Followed by: Lunar eclipse of August 15, 1962

=== Tritos ===
- Preceded by: Solar eclipse of September 10, 1942
- Followed by: Solar eclipse of July 9, 1964

=== Solar Saros 154 ===
- Preceded by: Solar eclipse of July 30, 1935
- Followed by: Solar eclipse of August 20, 1971

=== Inex ===
- Preceded by: Solar eclipse of August 30, 1924
- Followed by: Solar eclipse of July 20, 1982

=== Triad ===
- Preceded by: Solar eclipse of October 8, 1866

=== Solar eclipses of 1950–1953 ===
This eclipse is a member of a semester series. An eclipse in a semester series of solar eclipses repeats approximately every 177 days and 4 hours (a semester) at alternating nodes of the Moon's orbit.

The partial solar eclipse on July 11, 1953 occurs in the next lunar year eclipse set.

Solar eclipse series sets from 1950 to 1953
Ascending node			Descending node		
Saros	Map	Gamma	Saros	Map	Gamma
119	March 18, 1950 Annular (non-central)	0.9988	124	September 12, 1950 Total	0.8903
129	March 7, 1951 Annular	−0.242	134	September 1, 1951 Annular	0.1557
139	February 25, 1952 Total	0.4697	144	August 20, 1952 Annular	−0.6102
149	February 14, 1953 Partial	1.1331	154	August 9, 1953 Partial	−1.344

=== Saros 154 ===
This eclipse is a part of Saros series 154, repeating every 18 years, 11 days, and containing 71 events. The series started with a partial solar eclipse on July 19, 1917. It contains annular eclipses from October 3, 2043, through March 27, 2332; hybrid eclipses from April 7, 2350 through April 29, 2386; and total eclipses from May 9, 2404 through May 29, 3035. The series ends at member 71 as a partial eclipse on August 25, 3179. Its eclipses are tabulated in three columns; every third eclipse in the same column is one exeligmos apart, so they all cast shadows over approximately the same parts of the Earth.

The longest duration of annularity will be produced by member 9 at 3 minutes, 41 seconds on October 13, 2061, and the longest duration of totality will be produced by member 35 at 4 minutes, 50 seconds on July 25, 2530. All eclipses in this series occur at the Moon’s descending node of orbit.

Series members 1–16 occur between 1917 and 2200:
1	2	3
July 19, 1917	July 30, 1935	August 9, 1953
4	5	6
August 20, 1971	August 31, 1989	September 11, 2007
7	8	9
September 21, 2025	October 3, 2043	October 13, 2061
10	11	12
October 24, 2079	November 4, 2097	November 16, 2115
13	14	15
November 26, 2133	December 8, 2151	December 18, 2169
16
December 29, 2187

=== Metonic series ===
The metonic series repeats eclipses every 19 years (6939.69 days), lasting about 5 cycles. Eclipses occur in nearly the same calendar date. In addition, the octon subseries repeats 1/5 of that or every 3.8 years (1387.94 days). All eclipses in this table occur at the Moon's descending node.

22 eclipse events between March 16, 1866 and August 9, 1953
March 16–17	January 1–3	October 20–22	August 9–10	May 27–29
108	110	112	114	116
March 16, 1866			August 9, 1877	May 27, 1881
118	120	122	124	126
March 16, 1885	January 1, 1889	October 20, 1892	August 9, 1896	May 28, 1900
128	130	132	134	136
March 17, 1904	January 3, 1908	October 22, 1911	August 10, 1915	May 29, 1919
138	140	142	144	146
March 17, 1923	January 3, 1927	October 21, 1930	August 10, 1934	May 29, 1938
148	150	152	154	
March 16, 1942	January 3, 1946	October 21, 1949	August 9, 1953	

=== Tritos series ===
This eclipse is a part of a tritos cycle, repeating at alternating nodes every 135 synodic months (≈ 3986.63 days, or 11 years minus 1 month). Their appearance and longitude are irregular due to a lack of synchronization with the anomalistic month (period of perigee), but groupings of 3 tritos cycles (≈ 33 years minus 3 months) come close (≈ 434.044 anomalistic months), so eclipses are similar in these groupings.

Series members between 1801 and 1964
September 17, 1811 (Saros 141)	August 16, 1822 (Saros 142)	July 17, 1833 (Saros 143)	June 16, 1844 (Saros 144)	May 16, 1855 (Saros 145)
April 15, 1866 (Saros 146)	March 15, 1877 (Saros 147)	February 11, 1888 (Saros 148)	January 11, 1899 (Saros 149)	December 12, 1909 (Saros 150)
November 10, 1920 (Saros 151)	October 11, 1931 (Saros 152)	September 10, 1942 (Saros 153)	August 9, 1953 (Saros 154)	July 9, 1964 (Saros 155)

=== Inex series ===
This eclipse is a part of the long period inex cycle, repeating at alternating nodes, every 358 synodic months (≈ 10,571.95 days, or 29 years minus 20 days). Their appearance and longitude are irregular due to a lack of synchronization with the anomalistic month (period of perigee). However, groupings of 3 inex cycles (≈ 87 years minus 2 months) comes close (≈ 1,151.02 anomalistic months), so eclipses are similar in these groupings.

Series members between 1801 and 2069
November 18, 1808 (Saros 149)	October 29, 1837 (Saros 150)	October 8, 1866 (Saros 151)
September 18, 1895 (Saros 152)	August 30, 1924 (Saros 153)	August 9, 1953 (Saros 154)
July 20, 1982 (Saros 155)	July 1, 2011 (Saros 156)	
May 20, 2069 (Saros 158)		
