= Solar eclipse of November 5, 2059 =

Future annular solar eclipse

- Annular eclipse
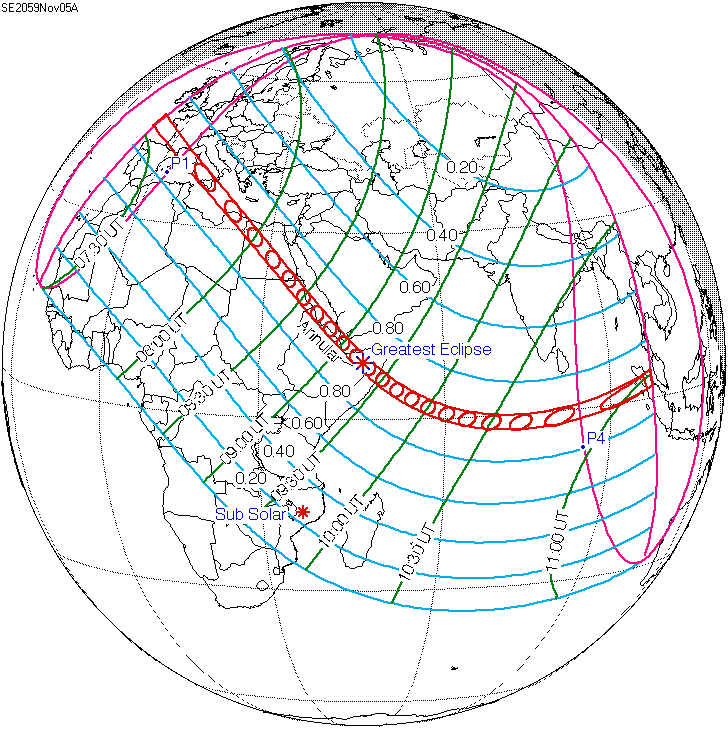
- Map
- Gamma: 0.4454
- Magnitude: 0.9417

Maximum eclipse
- Duration: 420 s (7 min 0 s)
- Coordinates: 8.7°N 47.1°E
- Max. width of band: 238 km (148 mi)

Times (UTC)
- Greatest eclipse: 9:18:15

References
- Saros: 134 (46 of 71)
- Catalog # (SE5000): 9641

An annular solar eclipse will occur at the Moon's descending node of orbit on Wednesday, November 5, 2059, with a magnitude of 0.9417. A solar eclipse occurs when the Moon passes between Earth and the Sun, thereby totally or partly obscuring the image of the Sun for a viewer on Earth. An annular solar eclipse occurs when the Moon's apparent diameter is smaller than the Sun's, blocking most of the Sun's light and causing the Sun to look like an annulus (ring). An annular eclipse appears as a partial eclipse over a region of the Earth thousands of kilometres wide. Occurring about 4.2 days after apogee (on November 1, 2059, at 4:40 UTC), the Moon's apparent diameter will be smaller.

The path of annularity will be visible from parts of France, northeastern Spain, Andorra, southern Italy, northeastern Libya, Egypt, northeastern Sudan, Eritrea, southwestern Yemen, far eastern Ethiopia, Somalia, the southern Maldives, and western Indonesia. A partial solar eclipse will also be visible for much of Europe, Africa, and Asia.

== Eclipse details ==
Shown below are two tables displaying details about this particular solar eclipse. The first table outlines times at which the Moon's penumbra or umbra attains the specific parameter, and the second table describes various other parameters pertaining to this eclipse.

November 5, 2059 Solar Eclipse Times
| Event | Time (UTC) |
|---|---|
| First Penumbral External Contact | 2059 November 05 at 06:23:16.3 UTC |
| First Umbral External Contact | 2059 November 05 at 07:31:24.1 UTC |
| First Central Line | 2059 November 05 at 07:34:09.8 UTC |
| First Umbral Internal Contact | 2059 November 05 at 07:36:56.4 UTC |
| Equatorial Conjunction | 2059 November 05 at 08:55:50.2 UTC |
| Ecliptic Conjunction | 2059 November 05 at 09:13:00.8 UTC |
| Greatest Eclipse | 2059 November 05 at 09:18:14.6 UTC |
| Greatest Duration | 2059 November 05 at 09:33:13.5 UTC |
| Last Umbral Internal Contact | 2059 November 05 at 10:59:49.0 UTC |
| Last Central Line | 2059 November 05 at 11:02:33.1 UTC |
| Last Umbral External Contact | 2059 November 05 at 11:05:16.2 UTC |
| Last Penumbral External Contact | 2059 November 05 at 12:13:17.0 UTC |

November 5, 2059 Solar Eclipse Parameters
| Parameter | Value |
|---|---|
| Eclipse Magnitude | 0.94166 |
| Eclipse Obscuration | 0.88673 |
| Gamma | 0.44543 |
| Sun Right Ascension | 14h42m02.6s |
| Sun Declination | -15°43'28.3" |
| Sun Semi-Diameter | 16'07.6" |
| Sun Equatorial Horizontal Parallax | 08.9" |
| Moon Right Ascension | 14h42m42.7s |
| Moon Declination | -15°21'02.7" |
| Moon Semi-Diameter | 14'58.8" |
| Moon Equatorial Horizontal Parallax | 0°54'58.7" |
| ΔT | 90.3 s |

== Eclipse season ==
This eclipse is part of an eclipse season, a period, roughly every six months, when eclipses occur. Only two (or occasionally three) eclipse seasons occur each year, and each season lasts about 35 days and repeats just short of six months (173 days) later; thus two full eclipse seasons always occur each year. Either two or three eclipses happen each eclipse season. In the sequence below, each eclipse is separated by a fortnight.

Eclipse season of November 2059
| November 5 Descending node (new moon) | November 19 Ascending node (full moon) |
|---|---|
| Annular solar eclipse Solar Saros 134 | Partial lunar eclipse Lunar Saros 146 |

== Related eclipses ==
=== Eclipses in 2059 ===
- A total solar eclipse on May 11.
- A partial lunar eclipse on May 27.
- An annular solar eclipse on November 5.
- A partial lunar eclipse on November 19.

=== Metonic ===
- Preceded by: Solar eclipse of January 16, 2056
- Followed by: Solar eclipse of August 24, 2063

=== Tzolkinex ===
- Preceded by: Solar eclipse of September 22, 2052
- Followed by: Solar eclipse of December 17, 2066

=== Half-Saros ===
- Preceded by: Lunar eclipse of October 30, 2050
- Followed by: Lunar eclipse of November 9, 2068

=== Tritos ===
- Preceded by: Solar eclipse of December 5, 2048
- Followed by: Solar eclipse of October 4, 2070

=== Solar Saros 134 ===
- Preceded by: Solar eclipse of October 25, 2041
- Followed by: Solar eclipse of November 15, 2077

=== Inex ===
- Preceded by: Solar eclipse of November 25, 2030
- Followed by: Solar eclipse of October 14, 2088

=== Triad ===
- Preceded by: Solar eclipse of January 4, 1973
- Followed by: Solar eclipse of September 6, 2146

=== Solar eclipses of 2058–2061 ===
This eclipse is a member of a semester series. An eclipse in a semester series of solar eclipses repeats approximately every 177 days and 4 hours (a semester) at alternating nodes of the Moon's orbit.

The partial solar eclipse on June 21, 2058 occurs in the previous lunar year eclipse set.

Solar eclipse series sets from 2058 to 2061
| Ascending node | | | Descending node | | |
| Saros | Map | Gamma | Saros | Map | Gamma |
| 119 | May 22, 2058 Partial | −1.3194 | 124 | November 16, 2058 Partial | 1.1224 |
| 129 | May 11, 2059 Total | −0.508 | 134 | November 5, 2059 Annular | 0.4454 |
| 139 | April 30, 2060 Total | 0.2422 | 144 | October 24, 2060 Annular | −0.2625 |
| 149 | April 20, 2061 Total | 0.9578 | 154 | October 13, 2061 Annular | −0.9639 |

=== Saros 134 ===
This eclipse is a part of Saros series 134, repeating every 18 years, 11 days, and containing 71 events. The series started with a partial solar eclipse on June 22, 1248. It contains total eclipses from October 9, 1428 through December 24, 1554; hybrid eclipses from January 3, 1573 through June 27, 1843; and annular eclipses from July 8, 1861 through May 21, 2384. The series ends at member 72 as a partial eclipse on August 6, 2510. Its eclipses are tabulated in three columns; every third eclipse in the same column is one exeligmos apart, so they all cast shadows over approximately the same parts of the Earth.

The longest duration of totality was produced by member 11 at 1 minutes, 30 seconds on October 9, 1428, and the longest duration of annularity will be produced by member 52 at 10 minutes, 55 seconds on January 10, 2168. All eclipses in this series occur at the Moon’s descending node of orbit.

Series members 32–53 occur between 1801 and 2200:
| 32 | 33 | 34 |
|---|---|---|
| June 6, 1807 | June 16, 1825 | June 27, 1843 |
| 35 | 36 | 37 |
| July 8, 1861 | July 19, 1879 | July 29, 1897 |
| 38 | 39 | 40 |
| August 10, 1915 | August 21, 1933 | September 1, 1951 |
| 41 | 42 | 43 |
| September 11, 1969 | September 23, 1987 | October 3, 2005 |
| 44 | 45 | 46 |
| October 14, 2023 | October 25, 2041 | November 5, 2059 |
| 47 | 48 | 49 |
| November 15, 2077 | November 27, 2095 | December 8, 2113 |
| 50 | 51 | 52 |
| December 19, 2131 | December 30, 2149 | January 10, 2168 |
53
January 20, 2186

=== Metonic series ===
The metonic series repeats eclipses every 19 years (6939.69 days), lasting about 5 cycles. Eclipses occur in nearly the same calendar date. In addition, the octon subseries repeats 1/5 of that or every 3.8 years (1387.94 days). All eclipses in this table occur at the Moon's descending node.

22 eclipse events between June 12, 2029 and November 4, 2116
| June 11–12 | March 30–31 | January 16 | November 4–5 | August 23–24 |
| 118 | 120 | 122 | 124 | 126 |
|---|---|---|---|---|
| June 12, 2029 | March 30, 2033 | January 16, 2037 | November 4, 2040 | August 23, 2044 |
| 128 | 130 | 132 | 134 | 136 |
| June 11, 2048 | March 30, 2052 | January 16, 2056 | November 5, 2059 | August 24, 2063 |
| 138 | 140 | 142 | 144 | 146 |
| June 11, 2067 | March 31, 2071 | January 16, 2075 | November 4, 2078 | August 24, 2082 |
| 148 | 150 | 152 | 154 | 156 |
| June 11, 2086 | March 31, 2090 | January 16, 2094 | November 4, 2097 | August 24, 2101 |
| 158 | 160 | 162 | 164 | |
| June 12, 2105 | | | November 4, 2116 | |

=== Tritos series ===
This eclipse is a part of a tritos cycle, repeating at alternating nodes every 135 synodic months (≈ 3986.63 days, or 11 years minus 1 month). Their appearance and longitude are irregular due to a lack of synchronization with the anomalistic month (period of perigee), but groupings of 3 tritos cycles (≈ 33 years minus 3 months) come close (≈ 434.044 anomalistic months), so eclipses are similar in these groupings.

Series members between 1801 and 2200
| October 19, 1808 (Saros 111) | September 19, 1819 (Saros 112) | August 18, 1830 (Saros 113) | July 18, 1841 (Saros 114) | June 17, 1852 (Saros 115) |
| May 17, 1863 (Saros 116) | April 16, 1874 (Saros 117) | March 16, 1885 (Saros 118) | February 13, 1896 (Saros 119) | January 14, 1907 (Saros 120) |
| December 14, 1917 (Saros 121) | November 12, 1928 (Saros 122) | October 12, 1939 (Saros 123) | September 12, 1950 (Saros 124) | August 11, 1961 (Saros 125) |
| July 10, 1972 (Saros 126) | June 11, 1983 (Saros 127) | May 10, 1994 (Saros 128) | April 8, 2005 (Saros 129) | March 9, 2016 (Saros 130) |
| February 6, 2027 (Saros 131) | January 5, 2038 (Saros 132) | December 5, 2048 (Saros 133) | November 5, 2059 (Saros 134) | October 4, 2070 (Saros 135) |
| September 3, 2081 (Saros 136) | August 3, 2092 (Saros 137) | July 4, 2103 (Saros 138) | June 3, 2114 (Saros 139) | May 3, 2125 (Saros 140) |
| April 1, 2136 (Saros 141) | March 2, 2147 (Saros 142) | January 30, 2158 (Saros 143) | December 29, 2168 (Saros 144) | November 28, 2179 (Saros 145) |
October 29, 2190 (Saros 146)

=== Inex series ===
This eclipse is a part of the long period inex cycle, repeating at alternating nodes, every 358 synodic months (≈ 10,571.95 days, or 29 years minus 20 days). Their appearance and longitude are irregular due to a lack of synchronization with the anomalistic month (period of perigee). However, groupings of 3 inex cycles (≈ 87 years minus 2 months) comes close (≈ 1,151.02 anomalistic months), so eclipses are similar in these groupings.

Series members between 1801 and 2200
| April 14, 1828 (Saros 126) | March 25, 1857 (Saros 127) | March 5, 1886 (Saros 128) |
| February 14, 1915 (Saros 129) | January 25, 1944 (Saros 130) | January 4, 1973 (Saros 131) |
| December 14, 2001 (Saros 132) | November 25, 2030 (Saros 133) | November 5, 2059 (Saros 134) |
| October 14, 2088 (Saros 135) | September 26, 2117 (Saros 136) | September 6, 2146 (Saros 137) |
| August 16, 2175 (Saros 138) | | |
