= Solar eclipse of October 3, 2043 =

Future annular solar eclipse

- Annular eclipse
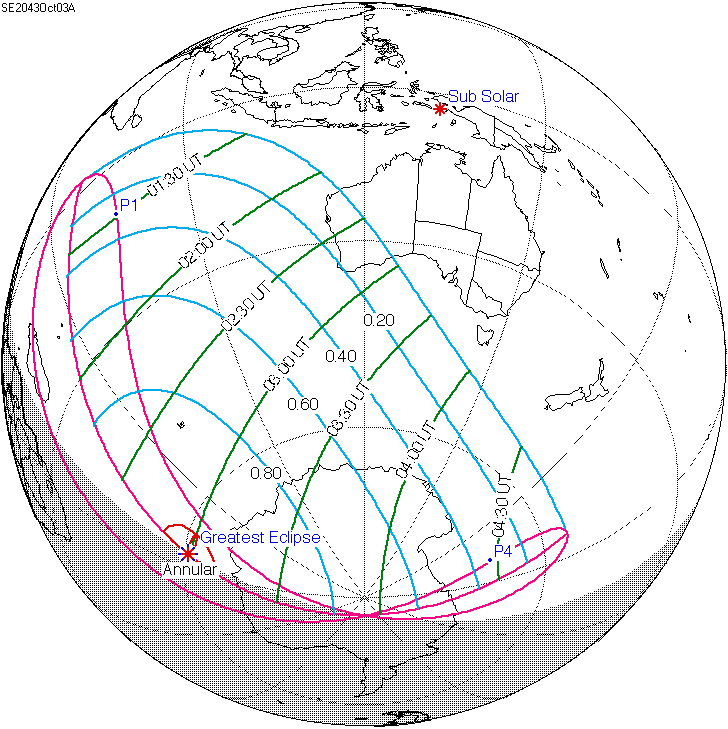
- Map
- Gamma: 1.0102
- Magnitude: 0.9497

Maximum eclipse
- Duration: -
- Coordinates: 61°S 35.3°E
- Max. width of band: km

Times (UTC)
- Greatest eclipse: 3:01:49

References
- Saros: 154 (8 of 71)
- Catalog # (SE5000): 9604

An annular solar eclipse will occur at the Moon's descending node of orbit on Saturday, October 3, 2043, with a magnitude of 0.9497. A solar eclipse occurs when the Moon passes between Earth and the Sun, thereby totally or partly obscuring the image of the Sun for a viewer on Earth. An annular solar eclipse occurs when the Moon's apparent diameter is smaller than the Sun's, blocking most of the Sun's light and causing the Sun to look like an annulus (ring). An annular eclipse appears as a partial eclipse over a region of the Earth thousands of kilometres wide. Occurring about 4.8 days before apogee (on October 7, 2043, at 23:20 UTC), the Moon's apparent diameter will be smaller.

It will be unusual in that while it is an annular solar eclipse, it is not a central solar eclipse. A non-central eclipse is one where the center-line of annularity does not intersect the surface of the Earth (when the gamma is between 0.9972 and 1.0260). Instead, the center line passes just above the Earth's surface. This rare type occurs when annularity is only visible at sunset or sunrise in a polar region.

While the path of annularity will be not visible from any land areas, a partial solar eclipse will be visible for parts of Madagascar, Antarctica, and southwestern Australia. This will be the first of 56 umbral eclipses in Solar Saros 154.

== Images ==
Animated path

== Eclipse timing ==
=== Places experiencing partial eclipse ===
Solar Eclipse of October 3, 2043 (Local Times)
Country or territory	City or place	Start of partial eclipse	Maximum eclipse	End of partial eclipse	Duration of eclipse (hr:min)	Maximum coverage
Maldives	Addu City	05:54:44	06:16:56	06:39:59	0:47	1.84%
British Indian Ocean Territory	Diego Garcia	06:54:14 (sunrise)	07:24:34	08:07:43	1:13	12.22%
Cocos (Keeling) Islands	Bantam	07:27:37	08:06:57	08:49:03	1:21	6.22%
Mauritius	Port Mathurin	05:26:25 (sunrise)	05:42:47	06:41:44	1:15	39.82%
Mauritius	Port Louis	05:49:57 (sunrise)	05:52:32	06:42:05	0:52	39.89%
Réunion	Saint-Pierre	05:57:38 (sunrise)	05:59:56	06:44:36	0:47	39.12%
Réunion	Saint-Denis	05:57:53 (sunrise)	06:00:10	06:43:34	0:46	37.59%
Réunion	Saint-Paul	05:58:34 (sunrise)	06:00:51	06:43:51	0:45	37.48%
French Southern and Antarctic Lands	Île Amsterdam	06:11:09	07:18:33	08:33:09	2:22	62.51%
Australia	Carnarvon	09:40:48	10:19:00	10:59:03	1:18	3.50%
Madagascar	Toamasina	05:22:57 (sunrise)	05:25:12	05:37:40	0:15	7.51%
Australia	Geraldton	09:44:33	10:29:52	11:17:30	1:33	5.88%
French Southern and Antarctic Lands	Île de la Possession	07:01:02 (sunrise)	07:30:34	08:37:50	1:37	83.65%
Madagascar	Antananarivo	05:30:13 (sunrise)	05:32:29	05:39:33	0:09	3.39%
Madagascar	Fianarantsoa	05:31:08 (sunrise)	05:33:25	05:45:00	0:14	7.25%
Madagascar	Antsirabe	05:31:53 (sunrise)	05:34:09	05:41:39	0:10	3.77%
Australia	Perth	09:50:19	10:39:25	11:30:57	1:41	7.44%
French Southern and Antarctic Lands	Port-aux-Français	06:31:55	07:40:00	08:54:01	2:22	78.44%
Australia	Mandurah	09:50:11	10:40:40	11:33:41	1:44	8.19%
Australia	Albany	09:59:01	10:49:46	11:42:42	1:44	8.05%
Australia	Esperance	10:15:54	10:52:44	11:30:35	1:15	2.66%
South Africa	Marion Island	05:56:13 (sunrise)	05:59:20	06:36:18	0:40	44.73%
Antarctica	Mawson Station	07:08:25	08:15:40	09:26:08	2:18	84.27%
Antarctica	Davis Station	09:13:05	10:22:40	11:35:05	2:22	77.21%
Antarctica	Casey Station	10:26:40	11:38:28	12:51:32	2:25	53.45%
Antarctica	Concordia Station	10:45:09	11:53:31	13:01:54	2:17	54.01%
Antarctica	Dumont d'Urville Station	12:57:20	14:02:18	15:06:15	2:09	31.82%
Antarctica	McMurdo Station	16:07:27	17:10:11	18:11:46	2:04	43.53%
Antarctica	Zucchelli Station	16:10:33	17:12:34	18:13:14	2:03	37.58%
Australia	Macquarie Island	13:55:16	14:20:50	14:45:53	0:51	1.27%

== Eclipse details ==
Shown below are two tables displaying details about this particular solar eclipse. The first table outlines times at which the Moon's penumbra or umbra attains the specific parameter, and the second table describes various other parameters pertaining to this eclipse.

October 3, 2043 Solar Eclipse Times
Event	Time (UTC)
First Penumbral External Contact	2043 October 3 at 00:44:16.8 UTC
First Umbral External Contact	2043 October 3 at 02:51:37.4 UTC
Greatest Eclipse	2043 October 3 at 03:01:48.9 UTC
Last Umbral External Contact	2043 October 3 at 03:11:24.2 UTC
Ecliptic Conjunction	2043 October 3 at 03:13:23.8 UTC
Equatorial Conjunction	2043 October 3 at 04:05:54.0 UTC
Last Penumbral External Contact	2043 October 3 at 05:19:01.1 UTC

October 3, 2043 Solar Eclipse Parameters
Parameter	Value
Eclipse Magnitude	0.94968
Eclipse Obscuration	-
Gamma	−1.01019
Sun Right Ascension	12h36m02.9s
Sun Declination	-03°53'04.6"
Sun Semi-Diameter	15'58.8"
Sun Equatorial Horizontal Parallax	08.8"
Moon Right Ascension	12h34m15.0s
Moon Declination	-04°41'56.9"
Moon Semi-Diameter	15'05.1"
Moon Equatorial Horizontal Parallax	0°55'21.7"
ΔT	80.5 s

== Eclipse season ==
This eclipse is part of an eclipse season, a period, roughly every six months, when eclipses occur. Only two (or occasionally three) eclipse seasons occur each year, and each season lasts about 35 days and repeats just short of six months (173 days) later; thus two full eclipse seasons always occur each year. Either two or three eclipses happen each eclipse season. In the sequence below, each eclipse is separated by a fortnight.

Eclipse season of September–October 2043
September 19 Ascending node (full moon)	October 3 Descending node (new moon)
Total lunar eclipse Lunar Saros 128	Annular solar eclipse Solar Saros 154

== Related eclipses ==
=== Eclipses in 2043 ===
- A total lunar eclipse on March 25.
- A non-central total solar eclipse on April 9.
- A total lunar eclipse on September 19.
- A non-central annular solar eclipse on October 3.

=== Metonic ===
- Preceded by: Solar eclipse of December 15, 2039
- Followed by: Solar eclipse of July 22, 2047

=== Tzolkinex ===
- Preceded by: Solar eclipse of August 21, 2036
- Followed by: Solar eclipse of November 14, 2050

=== Half-Saros ===
- Preceded by: Lunar eclipse of September 28, 2034
- Followed by: Lunar eclipse of October 8, 2052

=== Tritos ===
- Preceded by: Solar eclipse of November 3, 2032
- Followed by: Solar eclipse of September 2, 2054

=== Solar Saros 154 ===
- Preceded by: Solar eclipse of September 21, 2025
- Followed by: Solar eclipse of October 13, 2061

=== Inex ===
- Preceded by: Solar eclipse of October 23, 2014
- Followed by: Solar eclipse of September 12, 2072

=== Triad ===
- Preceded by: Solar eclipse of December 2, 1956
- Followed by: Solar eclipse of August 4, 2130

=== Solar eclipses of 2040–2043 ===
This eclipse is a member of a semester series. An eclipse in a semester series of solar eclipses repeats approximately every 177 days and 4 hours (a semester) at alternating nodes of the Moon's orbit.

Solar eclipse series sets from 2040 to 2043
Ascending node			Descending node		
Saros	Map	Gamma	Saros	Map	Gamma
119	May 11, 2040 Partial	−1.2529	124	November 4, 2040 Partial	1.0993
129	April 30, 2041 Total	−0.4492	134	October 25, 2041 Annular	0.4133
139	April 20, 2042 Total	0.2956	144	October 14, 2042 Annular	−0.303
149	April 9, 2043 Total (non-central)	1.0031	154	October 3, 2043 Annular (non-central)	1.0102

=== Saros 154 ===
This eclipse is a part of Saros series 154, repeating every 18 years, 11 days, and containing 71 events. The series started with a partial solar eclipse on July 19, 1917. It contains annular eclipses from October 3, 2043, through March 27, 2332; hybrid eclipses from April 7, 2350 through April 29, 2386; and total eclipses from May 9, 2404 through May 29, 3035. The series ends at member 71 as a partial eclipse on August 25, 3179. Its eclipses are tabulated in three columns; every third eclipse in the same column is one exeligmos apart, so they all cast shadows over approximately the same parts of the Earth.

The longest duration of annularity will be produced by member 9 at 3 minutes, 41 seconds on October 13, 2061, and the longest duration of totality will be produced by member 35 at 4 minutes, 50 seconds on July 25, 2530. All eclipses in this series occur at the Moon’s descending node of orbit.

Series members 1–16 occur between 1917 and 2200:
1	2	3
July 19, 1917	July 30, 1935	August 9, 1953
4	5	6
August 20, 1971	August 31, 1989	September 11, 2007
7	8	9
September 21, 2025	October 3, 2043	October 13, 2061
10	11	12
October 24, 2079	November 4, 2097	November 16, 2115
13	14	15
November 26, 2133	December 8, 2151	December 18, 2169
16
December 29, 2187

=== Metonic series ===
The metonic series repeats eclipses every 19 years (6939.69 days), lasting about 5 cycles. Eclipses occur in nearly the same calendar date. In addition, the octon subseries repeats 1/5 of that or every 3.8 years (1387.94 days). All eclipses in this table occur at the Moon's descending node.

21 eclipse events between July 22, 1971 and July 22, 2047
July 22	May 9–11	February 26–27	December 14–15	October 2–3
116	118	120	122	124
July 22, 1971	May 11, 1975	February 26, 1979	December 15, 1982	October 3, 1986
126	128	130	132	134
July 22, 1990	May 10, 1994	February 26, 1998	December 14, 2001	October 3, 2005
136	138	140	142	144
July 22, 2009	May 10, 2013	February 26, 2017	December 14, 2020	October 2, 2024
146	148	150	152	154
July 22, 2028	May 9, 2032	February 27, 2036	December 15, 2039	October 3, 2043
156
July 22, 2047

=== Tritos series ===
This eclipse is a part of a tritos cycle, repeating at alternating nodes every 135 synodic months (≈ 3986.63 days, or 11 years minus 1 month). Their appearance and longitude are irregular due to a lack of synchronization with the anomalistic month (period of perigee), but groupings of 3 tritos cycles (≈ 33 years minus 3 months) come close (≈ 434.044 anomalistic months), so eclipses are similar in these groupings.

Series members between 1801 and 2087
August 17, 1803 (Saros 132)	July 17, 1814 (Saros 133)	June 16, 1825 (Saros 134)	May 15, 1836 (Saros 135)	April 15, 1847 (Saros 136)
March 15, 1858 (Saros 137)	February 11, 1869 (Saros 138)	January 11, 1880 (Saros 139)	December 12, 1890 (Saros 140)	November 11, 1901 (Saros 141)
October 10, 1912 (Saros 142)	September 10, 1923 (Saros 143)	August 10, 1934 (Saros 144)	July 9, 1945 (Saros 145)	June 8, 1956 (Saros 146)
May 9, 1967 (Saros 147)	April 7, 1978 (Saros 148)	March 7, 1989 (Saros 149)	February 5, 2000 (Saros 150)	January 4, 2011 (Saros 151)
December 4, 2021 (Saros 152)	November 3, 2032 (Saros 153)	October 3, 2043 (Saros 154)	September 2, 2054 (Saros 155)	August 2, 2065 (Saros 156)
July 1, 2076 (Saros 157)	June 1, 2087 (Saros 158)			

=== Inex series ===
This eclipse is a part of the long period inex cycle, repeating at alternating nodes, every 358 synodic months (≈ 10,571.95 days, or 29 years minus 20 days). Their appearance and longitude are irregular due to a lack of synchronization with the anomalistic month (period of perigee). However, groupings of 3 inex cycles (≈ 87 years minus 2 months) comes close (≈ 1,151.02 anomalistic months), so eclipses are similar in these groupings.

Series members between 1801 and 2200
March 13, 1812 (Saros 146)	February 21, 1841 (Saros 147)	January 31, 1870 (Saros 148)
January 11, 1899 (Saros 149)	December 24, 1927 (Saros 150)	December 2, 1956 (Saros 151)
November 12, 1985 (Saros 152)	October 23, 2014 (Saros 153)	October 3, 2043 (Saros 154)
September 12, 2072 (Saros 155)	August 24, 2101 (Saros 156)	August 4, 2130 (Saros 157)
July 15, 2159 (Saros 158)	June 24, 2188 (Saros 159)	
