= Solar eclipse of November 3, 2032 =

Future solar eclipse

- Partial eclipse
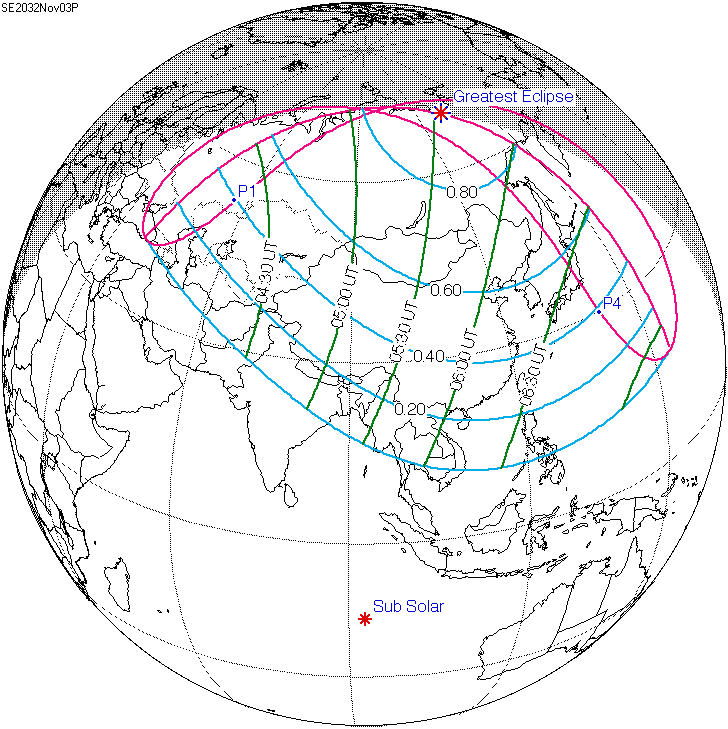
- Map
- Gamma: 1.0643
- Magnitude: 0.8554

Maximum eclipse
- Coordinates: 70.4°N 132.6°E

Times (UTC)
- Greatest eclipse: 5:34:13

References
- Saros: 153 (10 of 70)
- Catalog # (SE5000): 9580

A partial solar eclipse will occur at the Moon's ascending node of orbit on Wednesday, November 3, 2032, with a magnitude of 0.8554. A solar eclipse occurs when the Moon passes between Earth and the Sun, thereby totally or partly obscuring the image of the Sun for a viewer on Earth. A partial solar eclipse occurs in the polar regions of the Earth when the center of the Moon's shadow misses the Earth.

A partial eclipse will be visible for most of Asia.

== Images ==
Animated path

== Eclipse timing ==
=== Places experiencing partial eclipse ===
Solar Eclipse of November 3, 2032 (Local Times)
| Country or territory | City or place | Start of partial eclipse | Maximum eclipse | End of partial eclipse | Duration of eclipse (hr:min) | Maximum coverage |
|---|---|---|---|---|---|---|
| Tajikistan | Dushanbe | 08:34:51 | 09:26:32 | 10:22:16 | 1:47 | 10.56% |
| Afghanistan | Kabul | 08:15:51 | 08:56:57 | 09:40:43 | 1:25 | 4.58% |
| Uzbekistan | Tashkent | 08:30:13 | 09:27:45 | 10:30:02 | 2:00 | 15.82% |
| Pakistan | Islamabad | 08:46:43 | 09:33:23 | 10:23:17 | 1:37 | 6.20% |
| Kazakhstan | Astana | 08:25:13 | 09:34:31 | 10:48:59 | 2:24 | 36.23% |
| Kyrgyzstan | Bishkek | 09:29:37 | 10:35:39 | 11:47:03 | 2:17 | 23.57% |
| Kazakhstan | Almaty | 08:30:15 | 09:39:15 | 10:53:38 | 2:23 | 26.51% |
| India | New Delhi | 09:36:02 | 10:13:11 | 10:52:11 | 1:16 | 2.43% |
| Russia | Moscow | 07:40:38 (sunrise) | 07:45:51 | 08:09:08 | 0:29 | 10.94% |
| Nepal | Kathmandu | 09:51:04 | 10:46:23 | 11:44:20 | 1:53 | 7.23% |
| Bhutan | Thimphu | 10:08:10 | 11:11:42 | 12:17:28 | 2:09 | 10.56% |
| India | Kolkata | 10:01:11 | 10:43:45 | 11:27:22 | 1:26 | 2.68% |
| Bangladesh | Dhaka | 10:24:02 | 11:17:31 | 12:12:18 | 1:48 | 5.52% |
| Russia | Tiksi | 13:14:57 | 14:29:21 | 14:45:43 (sunset) | 1:31 | 79.66% |
| Mongolia | Ulaanbaatar | 12:00:42 | 13:30:20 | 14:57:27 | 2:57 | 59.44% |
| Russia | Verkhoyansk | 14:21:45 | 15:37:55 | 16:16:42 (sunset) | 1:55 | 79.55% |
| Myanmar | Yangon | 11:39:45 | 12:10:30 | 12:41:05 | 1:01 | 0.86% |
| Russia | Yakutsk | 13:23:28 | 14:43:21 | 15:59:01 | 2:36 | 77.72% |
| Russia | Magadan | 15:48:18 | 16:52:35 | 16:57:30 (sunset) | 1:09 | 67.37% |
| Laos | Vientiane | 12:01:14 | 12:54:57 | 13:46:50 | 1:46 | 4.96% |
| Thailand | Bangkok | 12:44:47 | 12:55:10 | 13:05:30 | 0:21 | 0.03% |
| China | Beijing | 12:25:49 | 13:56:58 | 15:20:39 | 2:55 | 50.85% |
| Vietnam | Hanoi | 11:50:24 | 12:58:52 | 14:03:38 | 2:13 | 11.33% |
| North Korea | Pyongyang | 13:46:50 | 15:13:54 | 16:31:35 | 2:45 | 49.97% |
| Macau | Macau | 13:01:09 | 14:14:39 | 15:21:37 | 2:20 | 16.06% |
| Hong Kong | Hong Kong | 13:02:10 | 14:15:50 | 15:22:48 | 2:21 | 16.40% |
| South Korea | Seoul | 13:52:06 | 15:17:53 | 16:34:02 | 2:42 | 47.13% |
| Taiwan | Taipei | 13:10:12 | 14:26:26 | 15:34:08 | 2:24 | 22.37% |
| Japan | Tokyo | 14:20:58 | 15:35:35 | 16:41:29 | 2:23 | 39.63% |
| Philippines | Manila | 13:54:47 | 14:37:18 | 15:16:43 | 1:22 | 3.43% |

== Eclipse details ==
Shown below are two tables displaying details about this particular solar eclipse. The first table outlines times at which the Moon's penumbra or umbra attains the specific parameter, and the second table describes various other parameters pertaining to this eclipse.

November 3, 2032 Solar Eclipse Times
| Event | Time (UTC) |
|---|---|
| First Penumbral External Contact | 2032 November 03 at 03:23:35.3 UTC |
| Equatorial Conjunction | 2032 November 03 at 05:07:21.3 UTC |
| Greatest Eclipse | 2032 November 03 at 05:34:12.9 UTC |
| Ecliptic Conjunction | 2032 November 03 at 05:46:07.8 UTC |
| Last Penumbral External Contact | 2032 November 03 at 07:44:57.6 UTC |

November 3, 2032 Solar Eclipse Parameters
| Parameter | Value |
|---|---|
| Eclipse Magnitude | 0.85543 |
| Eclipse Obscuration | 0.79712 |
| Gamma | 1.06431 |
| Sun Right Ascension | 14h35m40.9s |
| Sun Declination | -15°13'54.9" |
| Sun Semi-Diameter | 16'07.4" |
| Sun Equatorial Horizontal Parallax | 08.9" |
| Moon Right Ascension | 14h36m33.6s |
| Moon Declination | -14°16'01.1" |
| Moon Semi-Diameter | 15'13.0" |
| Moon Equatorial Horizontal Parallax | 0°55'50.8" |
| ΔT | 75.1 s |

== Eclipse season ==
This eclipse is part of an eclipse season, a period, roughly every six months, when eclipses occur. Only two (or occasionally three) eclipse seasons occur each year, and each season lasts about 35 days and repeats just short of six months (173 days) later; thus two full eclipse seasons always occur each year. Either two or three eclipses happen each eclipse season. In the sequence below, each eclipse is separated by a fortnight.

Eclipse season of October–November 2032
| October 18 Descending node (full moon) | November 3 Ascending node (new moon) |
|---|---|
| Total lunar eclipse Lunar Saros 127 | Partial solar eclipse Solar Saros 153 |

== Related eclipses ==
=== Eclipses in 2032 ===
- A total lunar eclipse on April 25.
- An annular solar eclipse on May 9.
- A total lunar eclipse on October 18.
- A partial solar eclipse on November 3.

=== Metonic ===
- Preceded by: Solar eclipse of January 14, 2029
- Followed by: Solar eclipse of August 21, 2036

=== Tzolkinex ===
- Preceded by: Solar eclipse of September 21, 2025
- Followed by: Solar eclipse of December 15, 2039

=== Half-Saros ===
- Preceded by: Lunar eclipse of October 28, 2023
- Followed by: Lunar eclipse of November 8, 2041

=== Tritos ===
- Preceded by: Solar eclipse of December 4, 2021
- Followed by: Solar eclipse of October 3, 2043

=== Solar Saros 153 ===
- Preceded by: Solar eclipse of October 23, 2014
- Followed by: Solar eclipse of November 14, 2050

=== Inex ===
- Preceded by: Solar eclipse of November 23, 2003
- Followed by: Solar eclipse of October 13, 2061

=== Triad ===
- Preceded by: Solar eclipse of January 3, 1946
- Followed by: Solar eclipse of September 5, 2119

=== Solar eclipses of 2029–2032 ===
This eclipse is a member of a semester series. An eclipse in a semester series of solar eclipses repeats approximately every 177 days and 4 hours (a semester) at alternating nodes of the Moon's orbit.

The partial solar eclipses on January 14, 2029 and July 11, 2029 occur in the previous lunar year eclipse set.

Solar eclipse series sets from 2029 to 2032
| Descending node | | | Ascending node | | |
| Saros | Map | Gamma | Saros | Map | Gamma |
| 118 | June 12, 2029 Partial | 1.29431 | 123 | December 5, 2029 Partial | −1.06090 |
| 128 | June 1, 2030 Annular | 0.56265 | 133 | November 25, 2030 Total | −0.38669 |
| 138 | May 21, 2031 Annular | −0.19699 | 143 | November 14, 2031 Hybrid | 0.30776 |
| 148 | May 9, 2032 Annular | −0.93748 | 153 | November 3, 2032 Partial | 1.06431 |

=== Saros 153 ===
This eclipse is a part of Saros series 153, repeating every 18 years, 11 days, and containing 70 events. The series started with a partial solar eclipse on July 28, 1870. It contains annular eclipses from December 17, 2104 through May 26, 2970. There are no hybrid or total eclipses in this set. The series ends at member 70 as a partial eclipse on August 22, 3114. Its eclipses are tabulated in three columns; every third eclipse in the same column is one exeligmos apart, so they all cast shadows over approximately the same parts of the Earth.

The longest duration of annularity will be produced by member 38 at 7 minutes, 1 seconds on September 5, 2537. All eclipses in this series occur at the Moon’s ascending node of orbit.

Series members 1–19 occur between 1870 and 2200:
| 1 | 2 | 3 |
|---|---|---|
| July 28, 1870 | August 7, 1888 | August 20, 1906 |
| 4 | 5 | 6 |
| August 30, 1924 | September 10, 1942 | September 20, 1960 |
| 7 | 8 | 9 |
| October 2, 1978 | October 12, 1996 | October 23, 2014 |
| 10 | 11 | 12 |
| November 3, 2032 | November 14, 2050 | November 24, 2068 |
| 13 | 14 | 15 |
| December 6, 2086 | December 17, 2104 | December 28, 2122 |
| 16 | 17 | 18 |
| January 8, 2141 | January 19, 2159 | January 29, 2177 |
19
February 10, 2195

=== Metonic series ===
The metonic series repeats eclipses every 19 years (6939.69 days), lasting about 5 cycles. Eclipses occur in nearly the same calendar date. In addition, the octon subseries repeats 1/5 of that or every 3.8 years (1387.94 days). All eclipses in this table occur at the Moon's ascending node.

20 eclipse events between June 10, 1964 and August 21, 2036
| June 10–11 | March 28–29 | January 14–16 | November 3 | August 21–22 |
| 117 | 119 | 121 | 123 | 125 |
|---|---|---|---|---|
| June 10, 1964 | March 28, 1968 | January 16, 1972 | November 3, 1975 | August 22, 1979 |
| 127 | 129 | 131 | 133 | 135 |
| June 11, 1983 | March 29, 1987 | January 15, 1991 | November 3, 1994 | August 22, 1998 |
| 137 | 139 | 141 | 143 | 145 |
| June 10, 2002 | March 29, 2006 | January 15, 2010 | November 3, 2013 | August 21, 2017 |
| 147 | 149 | 151 | 153 | 155 |
| June 10, 2021 | March 29, 2025 | January 14, 2029 | November 3, 2032 | August 21, 2036 |

=== Tritos series ===
This eclipse is a part of a tritos cycle, repeating at alternating nodes every 135 synodic months (≈ 3986.63 days, or 11 years minus 1 month). Their appearance and longitude are irregular due to a lack of synchronization with the anomalistic month (period of perigee), but groupings of 3 tritos cycles (≈ 33 years minus 3 months) come close (≈ 434.044 anomalistic months), so eclipses are similar in these groupings.

Series members between 1801 and 2087
| August 17, 1803 (Saros 132) | July 17, 1814 (Saros 133) | June 16, 1825 (Saros 134) | May 15, 1836 (Saros 135) | April 15, 1847 (Saros 136) |
| March 15, 1858 (Saros 137) | February 11, 1869 (Saros 138) | January 11, 1880 (Saros 139) | December 12, 1890 (Saros 140) | November 11, 1901 (Saros 141) |
| October 10, 1912 (Saros 142) | September 10, 1923 (Saros 143) | August 10, 1934 (Saros 144) | July 9, 1945 (Saros 145) | June 8, 1956 (Saros 146) |
| May 9, 1967 (Saros 147) | April 7, 1978 (Saros 148) | March 7, 1989 (Saros 149) | February 5, 2000 (Saros 150) | January 4, 2011 (Saros 151) |
| December 4, 2021 (Saros 152) | November 3, 2032 (Saros 153) | October 3, 2043 (Saros 154) | September 2, 2054 (Saros 155) | August 2, 2065 (Saros 156) |
| July 1, 2076 (Saros 157) | June 1, 2087 (Saros 158) | | | |

=== Inex series ===
This eclipse is a part of the long period inex cycle, repeating at alternating nodes, every 358 synodic months (≈ 10,571.95 days, or 29 years minus 20 days). Their appearance and longitude are irregular due to a lack of synchronization with the anomalistic month (period of perigee). However, groupings of 3 inex cycles (≈ 87 years minus 2 months) comes close (≈ 1,151.02 anomalistic months), so eclipses are similar in these groupings.

Series members between 1801 and 2200
| April 13, 1801 (Saros 145) | March 24, 1830 (Saros 146) | March 4, 1859 (Saros 147) |
| February 11, 1888 (Saros 148) | January 23, 1917 (Saros 149) | January 3, 1946 (Saros 150) |
| December 13, 1974 (Saros 151) | November 23, 2003 (Saros 152) | November 3, 2032 (Saros 153) |
| October 13, 2061 (Saros 154) | September 23, 2090 (Saros 155) | September 5, 2119 (Saros 156) |
| August 14, 2148 (Saros 157) | July 25, 2177 (Saros 158) | |
