= Solar eclipse of November 4, 2097 =

Future annular solar eclipse

- Annular eclipse
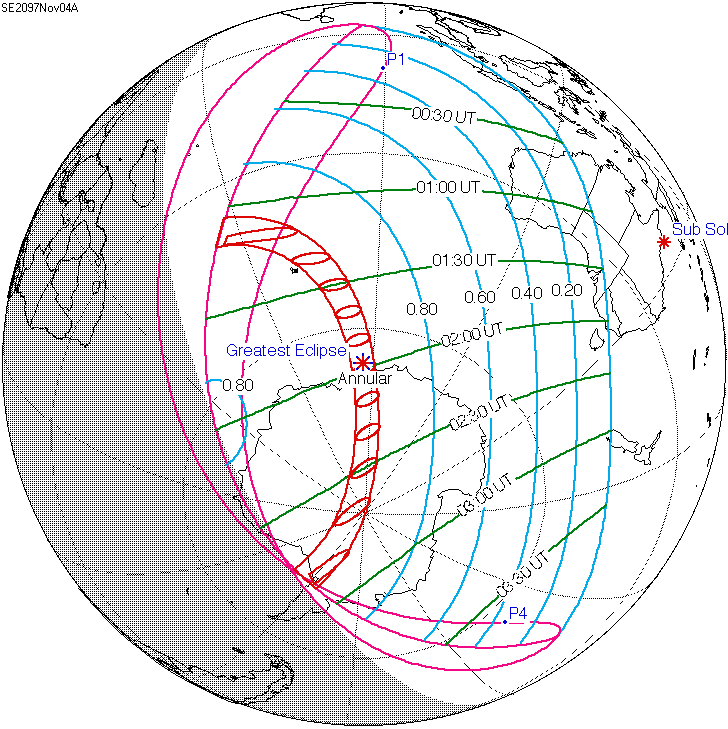
- Map
- Gamma: −0.8926
- Magnitude: 0.9494

Maximum eclipse
- Duration: 216 s (3 min 36 s)
- Coordinates: 65.8°S 86.8°E
- Max. width of band: 411 km (255 mi)

Times (UTC)
- Greatest eclipse: 2:01:25

References
- Saros: 154 (11 of 71)
- Catalog # (SE5000): 9727

An annular solar eclipse will occur at the Moon's descending node of orbit between Sunday, November 3 and Monday, November 4, 2097, with a magnitude of 0.9494. A solar eclipse occurs when the Moon passes between Earth and the Sun, thereby totally or partly obscuring the image of the Sun for a viewer on Earth. An annular solar eclipse occurs when the Moon's apparent diameter is smaller than the Sun's, blocking most of the Sun's light and causing the Sun to look like an annulus (ring). An annular eclipse appears as a partial eclipse over a region of the Earth thousands of kilometres wide. Occurring about 5.4 days before apogee (on November 9, 2097, at 12:15 UTC), the Moon's apparent diameter will be smaller.

The path of annularity will be visible from parts of Antarctica. A partial solar eclipse will also be visible for parts of southwestern Australia and Antarctica. This annular eclipse is notable in that the path of annularity passes over the South Pole.

== Eclipse details ==
Shown below are two tables displaying details about this particular solar eclipse. The first table outlines times at which the Moon's penumbra or umbra attains the specific parameter, and the second table describes various other parameters pertaining to this eclipse.

November 4, 2097 Solar Eclipse Times
Event	Time (UTC)
First Penumbral External Contact	2097 November 3 at 23:34:35.1 UTC
First Umbral External Contact	2097 November 4 at 01:06:01.0 UTC
First Central Line	2097 November 4 at 01:10:07.9 UTC
First Umbral Internal Contact	2097 November 4 at 01:14:32.3 UTC
Greatest Eclipse	2097 November 4 at 02:01:25.2 UTC
Greatest Duration	2097 November 4 at 02:10:27.8 UTC
Ecliptic Conjunction	2097 November 4 at 02:11:36.5 UTC
Equatorial Conjunction	2097 November 4 at 02:45:40.7 UTC
Last Umbral Internal Contact	2097 November 4 at 02:47:47.0 UTC
Last Central Line	2097 November 4 at 02:52:14.7 UTC
Last Umbral External Contact	2097 November 4 at 02:56:25.0 UTC
Last Penumbral External Contact	2097 November 4 at 04:28:03.3 UTC

November 4, 2097 Solar Eclipse Parameters
Parameter	Value
Eclipse Magnitude	0.94941
Eclipse Obscuration	0.90138
Gamma	−0.89264
Sun Right Ascension	14h40m01.3s
Sun Declination	-15°33'59.2"
Sun Semi-Diameter	16'07.3"
Sun Equatorial Horizontal Parallax	08.9"
Moon Right Ascension	14h38m39.0s
Moon Declination	-16°19'33.5"
Moon Semi-Diameter	15'12.3"
Moon Equatorial Horizontal Parallax	0°55'48.3"
ΔT	121.5 s

== Eclipse season ==
This eclipse is part of an eclipse season, a period, roughly every six months, when eclipses occur. Only two (or occasionally three) eclipse seasons occur each year, and each season lasts about 35 days and repeats just short of six months (173 days) later; thus two full eclipse seasons always occur each year. Either two or three eclipses happen each eclipse season. In the sequence below, each eclipse is separated by a fortnight.

Eclipse season of October–November 2097
October 21 Ascending node (full moon)	November 4 Descending node (new moon)
Total lunar eclipse Lunar Saros 128	Annular solar eclipse Solar Saros 154

== Related eclipses ==
=== Eclipses in 2097 ===
- A partial lunar eclipse on April 26.
- A total solar eclipse on May 11.
- A total lunar eclipse on October 21.
- An annular solar eclipse on November 4.

=== Metonic ===
- Preceded by: Solar eclipse of January 16, 2094
- Followed by: Solar eclipse of August 24, 2101

=== Tzolkinex ===
- Preceded by: Solar eclipse of September 23, 2090
- Followed by: Solar eclipse of December 17, 2104

=== Half-Saros ===
- Preceded by: Lunar eclipse of October 30, 2088
- Followed by: Lunar eclipse of November 11, 2106

=== Tritos ===
- Preceded by: Solar eclipse of December 6, 2086
- Followed by: Solar eclipse of October 4, 2108

=== Solar Saros 154 ===
- Preceded by: Solar eclipse of October 24, 2079
- Followed by: Solar eclipse of November 16, 2115

=== Inex ===
- Preceded by: Solar eclipse of November 24, 2068
- Followed by: Solar eclipse of October 16, 2126

=== Triad ===
- Preceded by: Solar eclipse of January 4, 2011
- Followed by: Solar eclipse of September 4, 2184

=== Solar eclipses of 2094–2098 ===
This eclipse is a member of a semester series. An eclipse in a semester series of solar eclipses repeats approximately every 177 days and 4 hours (a semester) at alternating nodes of the Moon's orbit.

The solar eclipses on January 16, 2094 (total) and July 12, 2094 (partial) occur in the previous lunar year eclipse set, and the partial solar eclipses on April 1, 2098 and September 25, 2098 occur in the next lunar year eclipse set.

Solar eclipse series sets from 2094 to 2098
Ascending node			Descending node		
Saros	Map	Gamma	Saros	Map	Gamma
119	June 13, 2094 Partial	−1.4613	124	December 7, 2094 Partial	1.1547
129	June 2, 2095 Total	−0.6396	134	November 27, 2095 Annular	0.4903
139	May 22, 2096 Total	0.1196	144	November 15, 2096 Annular	−0.20
149	May 11, 2097 Total	0.8516	154	November 4, 2097 Annular	−0.8926
159	May 1, 2098		164	October 24, 2098 Partial	−1.5407

=== Saros 154 ===
This eclipse is a part of Saros series 154, repeating every 18 years, 11 days, and containing 71 events. The series started with a partial solar eclipse on July 19, 1917. It contains annular eclipses from October 3, 2043, through March 27, 2332; hybrid eclipses from April 7, 2350 through April 29, 2386; and total eclipses from May 9, 2404 through May 29, 3035. The series ends at member 71 as a partial eclipse on August 25, 3179. Its eclipses are tabulated in three columns; every third eclipse in the same column is one exeligmos apart, so they all cast shadows over approximately the same parts of the Earth.

The longest duration of annularity will be produced by member 9 at 3 minutes, 41 seconds on October 13, 2061, and the longest duration of totality will be produced by member 35 at 4 minutes, 50 seconds on July 25, 2530. All eclipses in this series occur at the Moon’s descending node of orbit.

Series members 1–16 occur between 1917 and 2200:
1	2	3
July 19, 1917	July 30, 1935	August 9, 1953
4	5	6
August 20, 1971	August 31, 1989	September 11, 2007
7	8	9
September 21, 2025	October 3, 2043	October 13, 2061
10	11	12
October 24, 2079	November 4, 2097	November 16, 2115
13	14	15
November 26, 2133	December 8, 2151	December 18, 2169
16
December 29, 2187

=== Metonic series ===
The metonic series repeats eclipses every 19 years (6939.69 days), lasting about 5 cycles. Eclipses occur in nearly the same calendar date. In addition, the octon subseries repeats 1/5 of that or every 3.8 years (1387.94 days). All eclipses in this table occur at the Moon's descending node.

22 eclipse events between June 12, 2029 and November 4, 2116
June 11–12	March 30–31	January 16	November 4–5	August 23–24
118	120	122	124	126
June 12, 2029	March 30, 2033	January 16, 2037	November 4, 2040	August 23, 2044
128	130	132	134	136
June 11, 2048	March 30, 2052	January 16, 2056	November 5, 2059	August 24, 2063
138	140	142	144	146
June 11, 2067	March 31, 2071	January 16, 2075	November 4, 2078	August 24, 2082
148	150	152	154	156
June 11, 2086	March 31, 2090	January 16, 2094	November 4, 2097	August 24, 2101
158	160	162	164	
June 12, 2105			November 4, 2116	

=== Tritos series ===
This eclipse is a part of a tritos cycle, repeating at alternating nodes every 135 synodic months (≈ 3986.63 days, or 11 years minus 1 month). Their appearance and longitude are irregular due to a lack of synchronization with the anomalistic month (period of perigee), but groupings of 3 tritos cycles (≈ 33 years minus 3 months) come close (≈ 434.044 anomalistic months), so eclipses are similar in these groupings.

Series members between 1801 and 2200
February 21, 1803 (Saros 127)	January 21, 1814 (Saros 128)	December 20, 1824 (Saros 129)	November 20, 1835 (Saros 130)	October 20, 1846 (Saros 131)
September 18, 1857 (Saros 132)	August 18, 1868 (Saros 133)	July 19, 1879 (Saros 134)	June 17, 1890 (Saros 135)	May 18, 1901 (Saros 136)
April 17, 1912 (Saros 137)	March 17, 1923 (Saros 138)	February 14, 1934 (Saros 139)	January 14, 1945 (Saros 140)	December 14, 1955 (Saros 141)
November 12, 1966 (Saros 142)	October 12, 1977 (Saros 143)	September 11, 1988 (Saros 144)	August 11, 1999 (Saros 145)	July 11, 2010 (Saros 146)
June 10, 2021 (Saros 147)	May 9, 2032 (Saros 148)	April 9, 2043 (Saros 149)	March 9, 2054 (Saros 150)	February 5, 2065 (Saros 151)
January 6, 2076 (Saros 152)	December 6, 2086 (Saros 153)	November 4, 2097 (Saros 154)	October 5, 2108 (Saros 155)	September 5, 2119 (Saros 156)
August 4, 2130 (Saros 157)	July 3, 2141 (Saros 158)	June 3, 2152 (Saros 159)		April 1, 2174 (Saros 161)

=== Inex series ===
This eclipse is a part of the long period inex cycle, repeating at alternating nodes, every 358 synodic months (≈ 10,571.95 days, or 29 years minus 20 days). Their appearance and longitude are irregular due to a lack of synchronization with the anomalistic month (period of perigee). However, groupings of 3 inex cycles (≈ 87 years minus 2 months) comes close (≈ 1,151.02 anomalistic months), so eclipses are similar in these groupings.

Series members between 1801 and 2200
May 25, 1808 (Saros 144)	May 4, 1837 (Saros 145)	April 15, 1866 (Saros 146)
March 26, 1895 (Saros 147)	March 5, 1924 (Saros 148)	February 14, 1953 (Saros 149)
January 24, 1982 (Saros 150)	January 4, 2011 (Saros 151)	December 15, 2039 (Saros 152)
November 24, 2068 (Saros 153)	November 4, 2097 (Saros 154)	October 16, 2126 (Saros 155)
September 26, 2155 (Saros 156)	September 4, 2184 (Saros 157)	
