= Solar eclipse of November 24, 2068 =

Future partial solar eclipse

- Partial eclipse
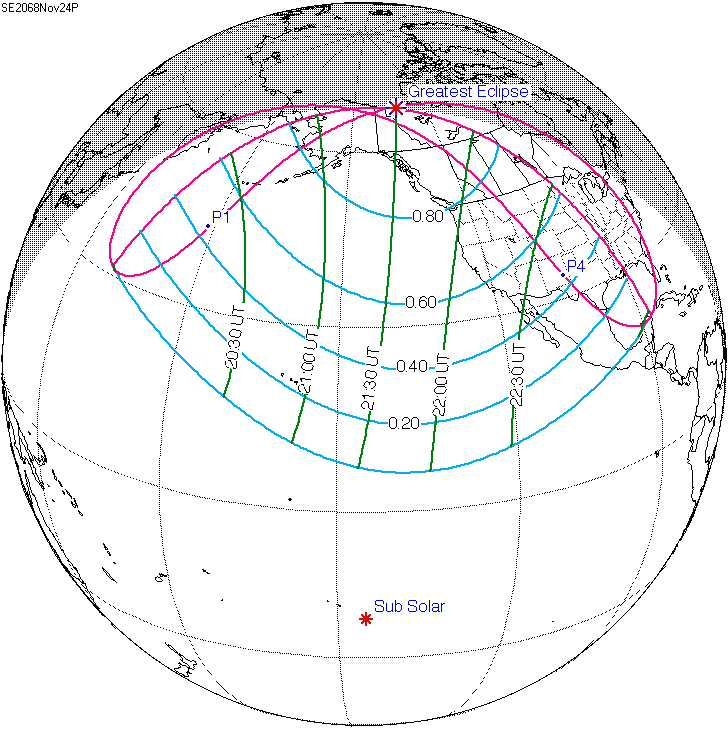
- Map
- Gamma: 1.0299
- Magnitude: 0.9109

Maximum eclipse
- Coordinates: 68.5°N 131.1°W

Times (UTC)
- Greatest eclipse: 21:32:30

References
- Saros: 153 (12 of 70)
- Catalog # (SE5000): 9661

A partial solar eclipse will occur at the Moon's ascending node of orbit on Saturday, November 24, 2068, with a magnitude of 0.9109. A solar eclipse occurs when the Moon passes between Earth and the Sun, thereby totally or partly obscuring the image of the Sun for a viewer on Earth. A partial solar eclipse occurs in the polar regions of the Earth when the center of the Moon's shadow misses the Earth.

The partial solar eclipse will be visible for parts of the Russian Far East and much of North America.

== Eclipse details ==
Shown below are two tables displaying details about this particular solar eclipse. The first table outlines times at which the Moon's penumbra or umbra attains the specific parameter, and the second table describes various other parameters pertaining to this eclipse.

November 24, 2068 Solar Eclipse Times
Event	Time (UTC)
First Penumbral External Contact	2068 November 24 at 19:16:52.1 UTC
Equatorial Conjunction	2068 November 24 at 21:21:22.0 UTC
Greatest Eclipse	2068 November 24 at 21:32:29.6 UTC
Ecliptic Conjunction	2068 November 24 at 21:44:08.8 UTC
Last Penumbral External Contact	2068 November 24 at 23:48:07.0 UTC

November 24, 2068 Solar Eclipse Parameters
Parameter	Value
Eclipse Magnitude	0.91091
Eclipse Obscuration	0.85473
Gamma	1.02988
Sun Right Ascension	16h05m39.1s
Sun Declination	-20°49'55.6"
Sun Semi-Diameter	16'12.0"
Sun Equatorial Horizontal Parallax	08.9"
Moon Right Ascension	16h06m01.8s
Moon Declination	-19°53'06.5"
Moon Semi-Diameter	15'08.3"
Moon Equatorial Horizontal Parallax	0°55'33.5"
ΔT	96.7 s

== Eclipse season ==
This eclipse is part of an eclipse season, a period, roughly every six months, when eclipses occur. Only two (or occasionally three) eclipse seasons occur each year, and each season lasts about 35 days and repeats just short of six months (173 days) later; thus two full eclipse seasons always occur each year. Either two or three eclipses happen each eclipse season. In the sequence below, each eclipse is separated by a fortnight.

Eclipse season of November 2068
November 9 Descending node (full moon)	November 24 Ascending node (new moon)
Total lunar eclipse Lunar Saros 127	Partial solar eclipse Solar Saros 153

== Related eclipses ==
=== Eclipses in 2068 ===
- A partial lunar eclipse on May 17.
- A total solar eclipse on May 31.
- A total lunar eclipse on November 9.
- A partial solar eclipse on November 24.

=== Metonic ===
- Preceded by: Solar eclipse of February 5, 2065
- Followed by: Solar eclipse of September 12, 2072

=== Tzolkinex ===
- Preceded by: Solar eclipse of October 13, 2061
- Followed by: Solar eclipse of January 6, 2076

=== Half-Saros ===
- Preceded by: Lunar eclipse of November 19, 2059
- Followed by: Lunar eclipse of November 29, 2077

=== Tritos ===
- Preceded by: Solar eclipse of December 26, 2057
- Followed by: Solar eclipse of October 24, 2079

=== Solar Saros 153 ===
- Preceded by: Solar eclipse of November 14, 2050
- Followed by: Solar eclipse of December 6, 2086

=== Inex ===
- Preceded by: Solar eclipse of December 15, 2039
- Followed by: Solar eclipse of November 4, 2097

=== Triad ===
- Preceded by: Solar eclipse of January 25, 1982
- Followed by: Solar eclipse of September 26, 2155

=== Solar eclipses of 2065–2069 ===
This eclipse is a member of a semester series. An eclipse in a semester series of solar eclipses repeats approximately every 177 days and 4 hours (a semester) at alternating nodes of the Moon's orbit.

The partial solar eclipses on February 5, 2065 and August 2, 2065 occur in the previous lunar year eclipse set, and the partial solar eclipses on April 21, 2069 and October 15, 2069 occur in the next lunar year eclipse set.

Solar eclipse series sets from 2065 to 2069
Descending node			Ascending node		
Saros	Map	Gamma	Saros	Map	Gamma
118	July 3, 2065 Partial	1.4619	123	December 27, 2065 Partial	−1.0688
128	June 22, 2066 Annular	0.733	133	December 17, 2066 Total	−0.4043
138	June 11, 2067 Annular	−0.0387	143	December 6, 2067 Hybrid	0.2845
148	May 31, 2068 Total	−0.797	153	November 24, 2068 Partial	1.0299
158	May 20, 2069 Partial	−1.4852			

=== Saros 153 ===
This eclipse is a part of Saros series 153, repeating every 18 years, 11 days, and containing 70 events. The series started with a partial solar eclipse on July 28, 1870. It contains annular eclipses from December 17, 2104 through May 26, 2970. There are no hybrid or total eclipses in this set. The series ends at member 70 as a partial eclipse on August 22, 3114. Its eclipses are tabulated in three columns; every third eclipse in the same column is one exeligmos apart, so they all cast shadows over approximately the same parts of the Earth.

The longest duration of annularity will be produced by member 38 at 7 minutes, 1 seconds on September 5, 2537. All eclipses in this series occur at the Moon’s ascending node of orbit.

Series members 1–19 occur between 1870 and 2200:
1	2	3
July 28, 1870	August 7, 1888	August 20, 1906
4	5	6
August 30, 1924	September 10, 1942	September 20, 1960
7	8	9
October 2, 1978	October 12, 1996	October 23, 2014
10	11	12
November 3, 2032	November 14, 2050	November 24, 2068
13	14	15
December 6, 2086	December 17, 2104	December 28, 2122
16	17	18
January 8, 2141	January 19, 2159	January 29, 2177
19
February 10, 2195

=== Metonic series ===
The metonic series repeats eclipses every 19 years (6939.69 days), lasting about 5 cycles. Eclipses occur in nearly the same calendar date. In addition, the octon subseries repeats 1/5 of that or every 3.8 years (1387.94 days). All eclipses in this table occur at the Moon's ascending node.

21 eclipse events between July 1, 2000 and July 1, 2076
July 1–2	April 19–20	February 5–7	November 24–25	September 12–13
117	119	121	123	125
July 1, 2000	April 19, 2004	February 7, 2008	November 25, 2011	September 13, 2015
127	129	131	133	135
July 2, 2019	April 20, 2023	February 6, 2027	November 25, 2030	September 12, 2034
137	139	141	143	145
July 2, 2038	April 20, 2042	February 5, 2046	November 25, 2049	September 12, 2053
147	149	151	153	155
July 1, 2057	April 20, 2061	February 5, 2065	November 24, 2068	September 12, 2072
157
July 1, 2076

=== Tritos series ===
This eclipse is a part of a tritos cycle, repeating at alternating nodes every 135 synodic months (≈ 3986.63 days, or 11 years minus 1 month). Their appearance and longitude are irregular due to a lack of synchronization with the anomalistic month (period of perigee), but groupings of 3 tritos cycles (≈ 33 years minus 3 months) come close (≈ 434.044 anomalistic months), so eclipses are similar in these groupings.

The partial solar eclipses on December 18, 2188 (part of Saros 164) and November 18, 2199 (part of Saros 165) are also a part of this series but are not included in the table below.

Series members between 1801 and 2134
December 10, 1806 (Saros 129)	November 9, 1817 (Saros 130)	October 9, 1828 (Saros 131)	September 7, 1839 (Saros 132)	August 7, 1850 (Saros 133)
July 8, 1861 (Saros 134)	June 6, 1872 (Saros 135)	May 6, 1883 (Saros 136)	April 6, 1894 (Saros 137)	March 6, 1905 (Saros 138)
February 3, 1916 (Saros 139)	January 3, 1927 (Saros 140)	December 2, 1937 (Saros 141)	November 1, 1948 (Saros 142)	October 2, 1959 (Saros 143)
August 31, 1970 (Saros 144)	July 31, 1981 (Saros 145)	June 30, 1992 (Saros 146)	May 31, 2003 (Saros 147)	April 29, 2014 (Saros 148)
March 29, 2025 (Saros 149)	February 27, 2036 (Saros 150)	January 26, 2047 (Saros 151)	December 26, 2057 (Saros 152)	November 24, 2068 (Saros 153)
October 24, 2079 (Saros 154)	September 23, 2090 (Saros 155)	August 24, 2101 (Saros 156)	July 23, 2112 (Saros 157)	June 23, 2123 (Saros 158)
May 23, 2134 (Saros 159)

=== Inex series ===
This eclipse is a part of the long period inex cycle, repeating at alternating nodes, every 358 synodic months (≈ 10,571.95 days, or 29 years minus 20 days). Their appearance and longitude are irregular due to a lack of synchronization with the anomalistic month (period of perigee). However, groupings of 3 inex cycles (≈ 87 years minus 2 months) comes close (≈ 1,151.02 anomalistic months), so eclipses are similar in these groupings.

Series members between 1801 and 2200
May 25, 1808 (Saros 144)	May 4, 1837 (Saros 145)	April 15, 1866 (Saros 146)
March 26, 1895 (Saros 147)	March 5, 1924 (Saros 148)	February 14, 1953 (Saros 149)
January 24, 1982 (Saros 150)	January 4, 2011 (Saros 151)	December 15, 2039 (Saros 152)
November 24, 2068 (Saros 153)	November 4, 2097 (Saros 154)	October 16, 2126 (Saros 155)
September 26, 2155 (Saros 156)	September 4, 2184 (Saros 157)	
