= Solar eclipse of October 2, 2024 =

Annular eclipse

- Annular eclipse
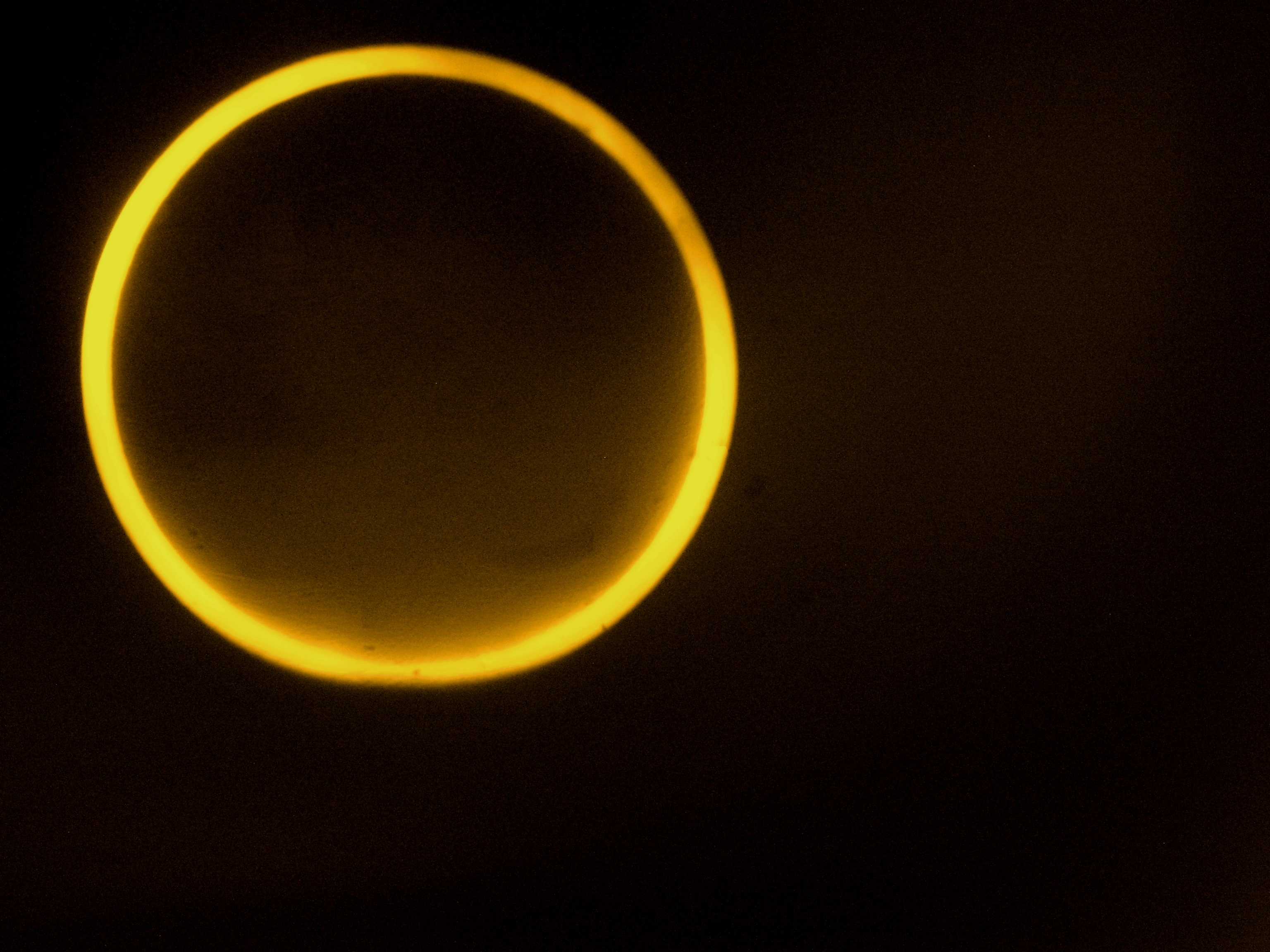
- Annularity as seen from Tres Cerros, Argentina

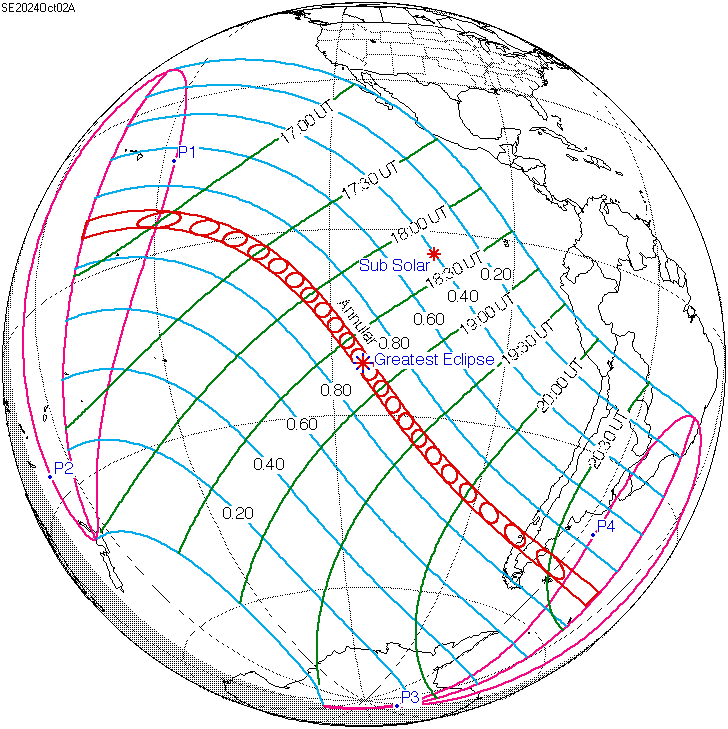
- Map
- Gamma: −0.3509
- Magnitude: 0.9326

Maximum eclipse
- Duration: 445 s (7 min 25 s)
- Coordinates: 22°S 114.5°W
- Max. width of band: 266 km (165 mi)

Times (UTC)
- Greatest eclipse: 18:46:13

References
- Saros: 144 (17 of 70)
- Catalog # (SE5000): 9562

An annular solar eclipse occurred at the Moon’s descending node of orbit on Wednesday, October 2, 2024, with a magnitude of 0.9326. A solar eclipse occurs when the Moon passes between Earth and the Sun, thereby totally or partly obscuring the image of the Sun for a viewer on Earth. An annular solar eclipse occurs when the Moon's apparent diameter is smaller than the Sun's, blocking most of the Sun's light and causing the Sun to look like an annulus (ring). An annular eclipse appears as a partial eclipse over a region of the Earth thousands of kilometres wide. Occurring about 2 hours before apogee (on October 2, 2024, at 20:40 UTC), the Moon's apparent diameter was smaller.

Other than Easter Island, the southern tips of Argentina and Chile, and the north of the Falkland Islands, the path of the eclipse's antumbra occurred over the Pacific Ocean. The penumbra was visible from Hawaii, eastern Oceania, southern and central South America, the southwesternmost parts of Mexico (more specifically, Baja California del Sur and Jalisco), and portions of Antarctica. The partial eclipse was observed at sunrise from Maunakea in Hawaii, where atmospheric refraction distorted the eclipsed Sun and produced a green rim. Approximately 175,000 people live in the path of annularity.

== Visibility ==
Animated path

== Images ==
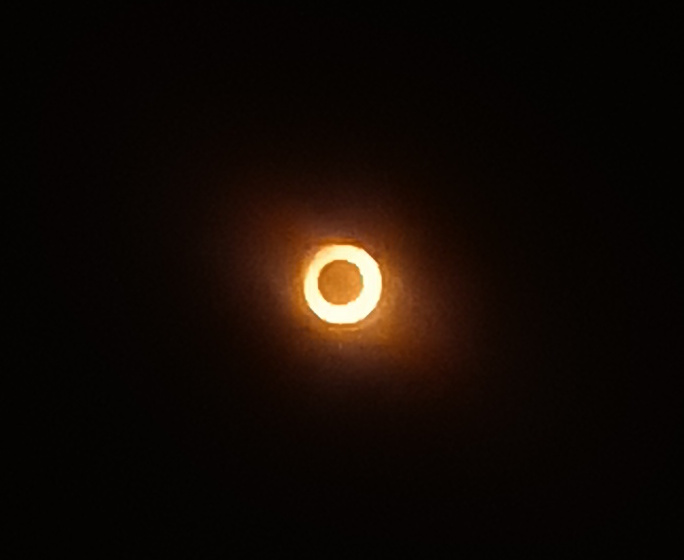
Hanga Roa, Easter Island, 19:06 UTC

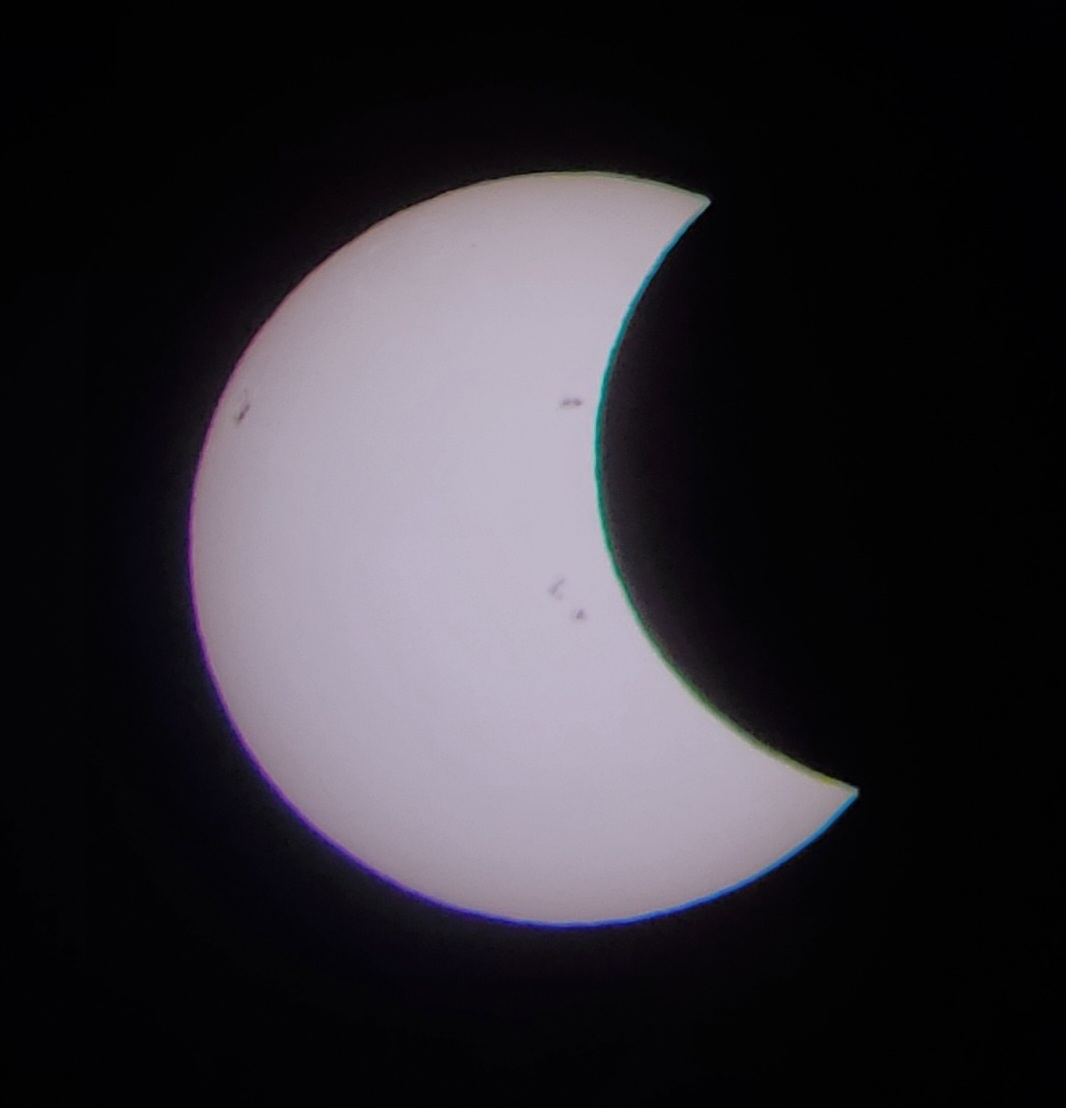
Partial from Montevideo, Uruguay, 20:14 UTC

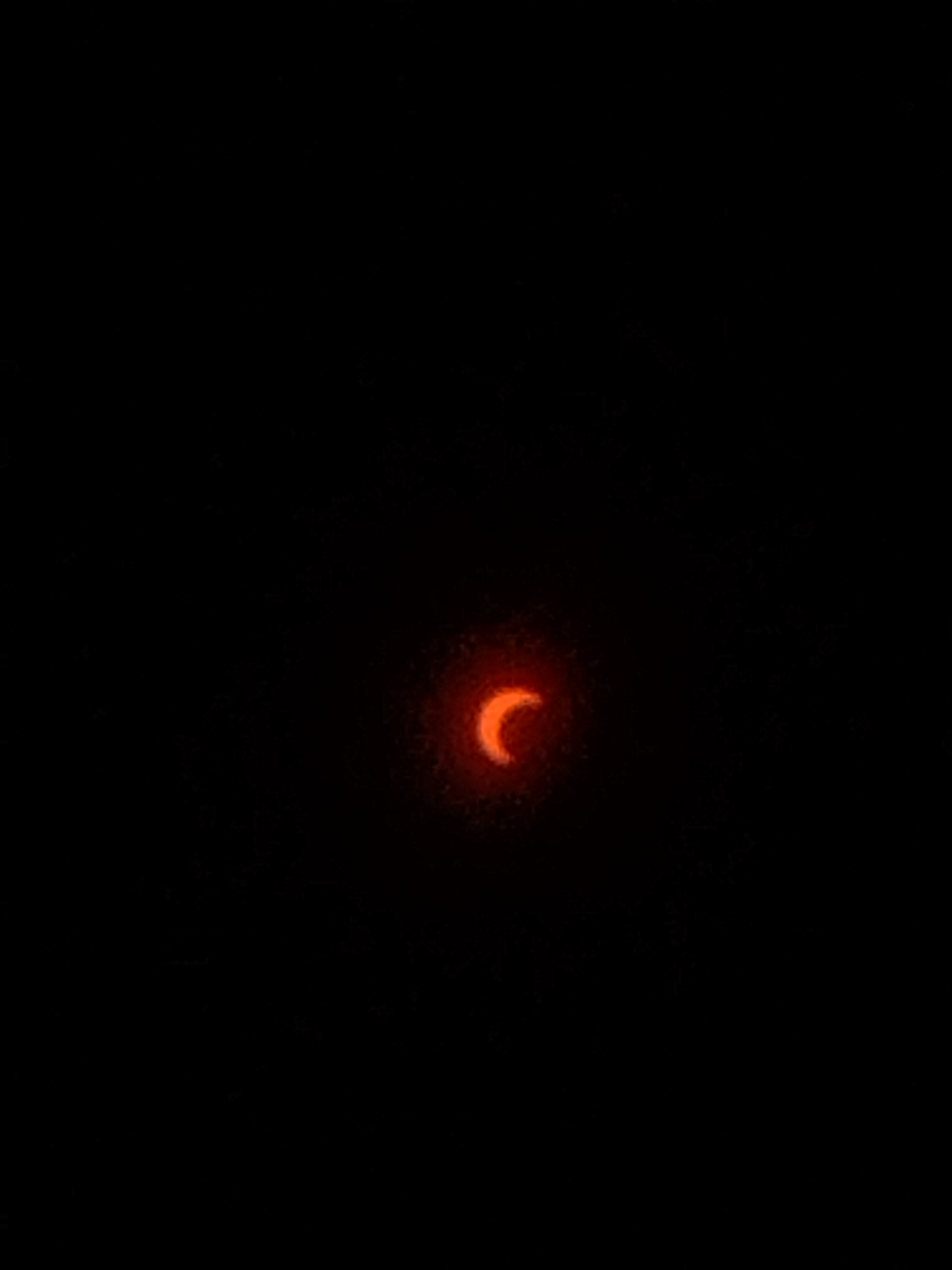
Partial from Puerto Williams, Chile, 20:24 UTC

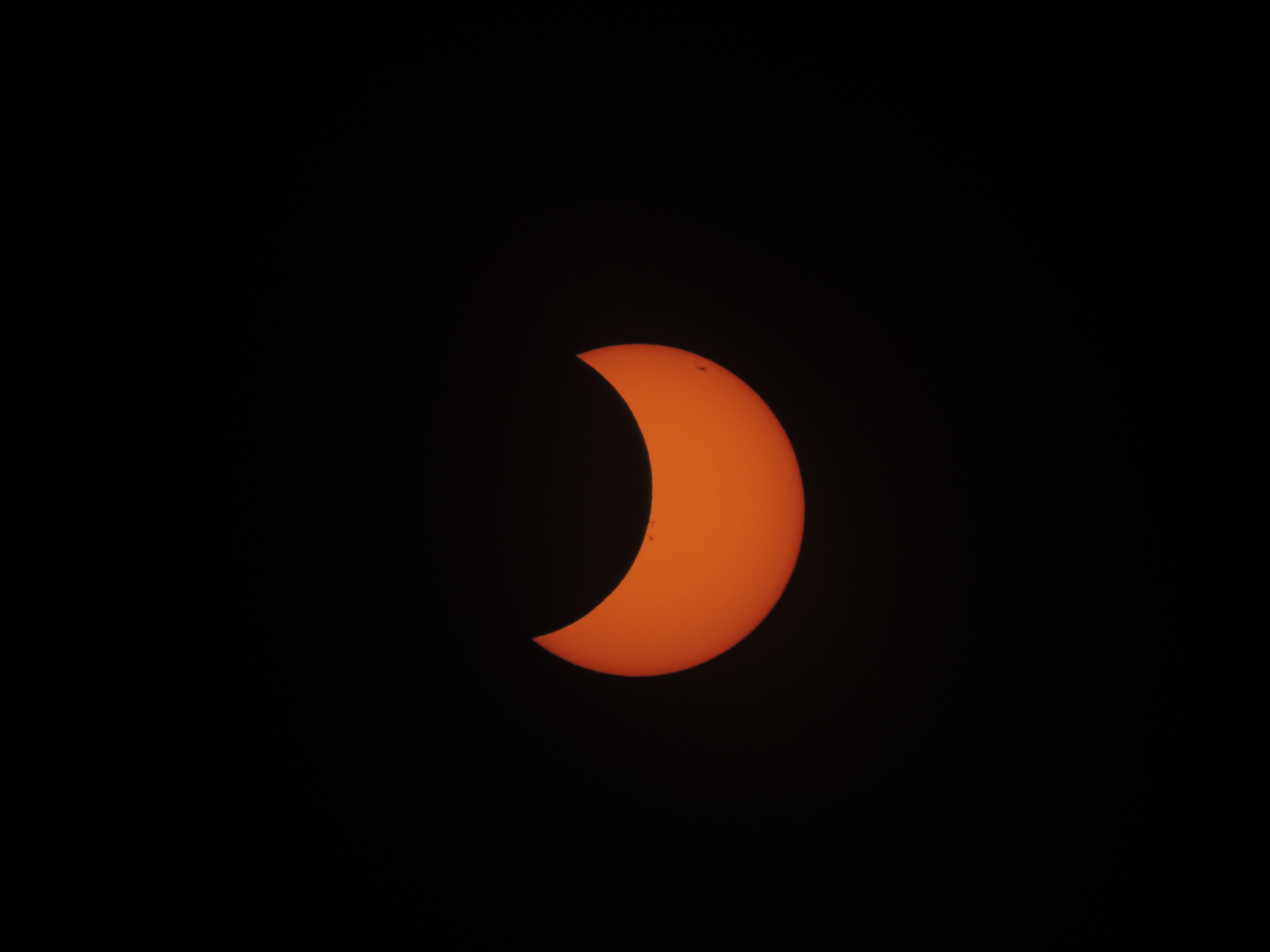
Partial from Manuel B. Gonnet, Argentina, 20:38 UTC

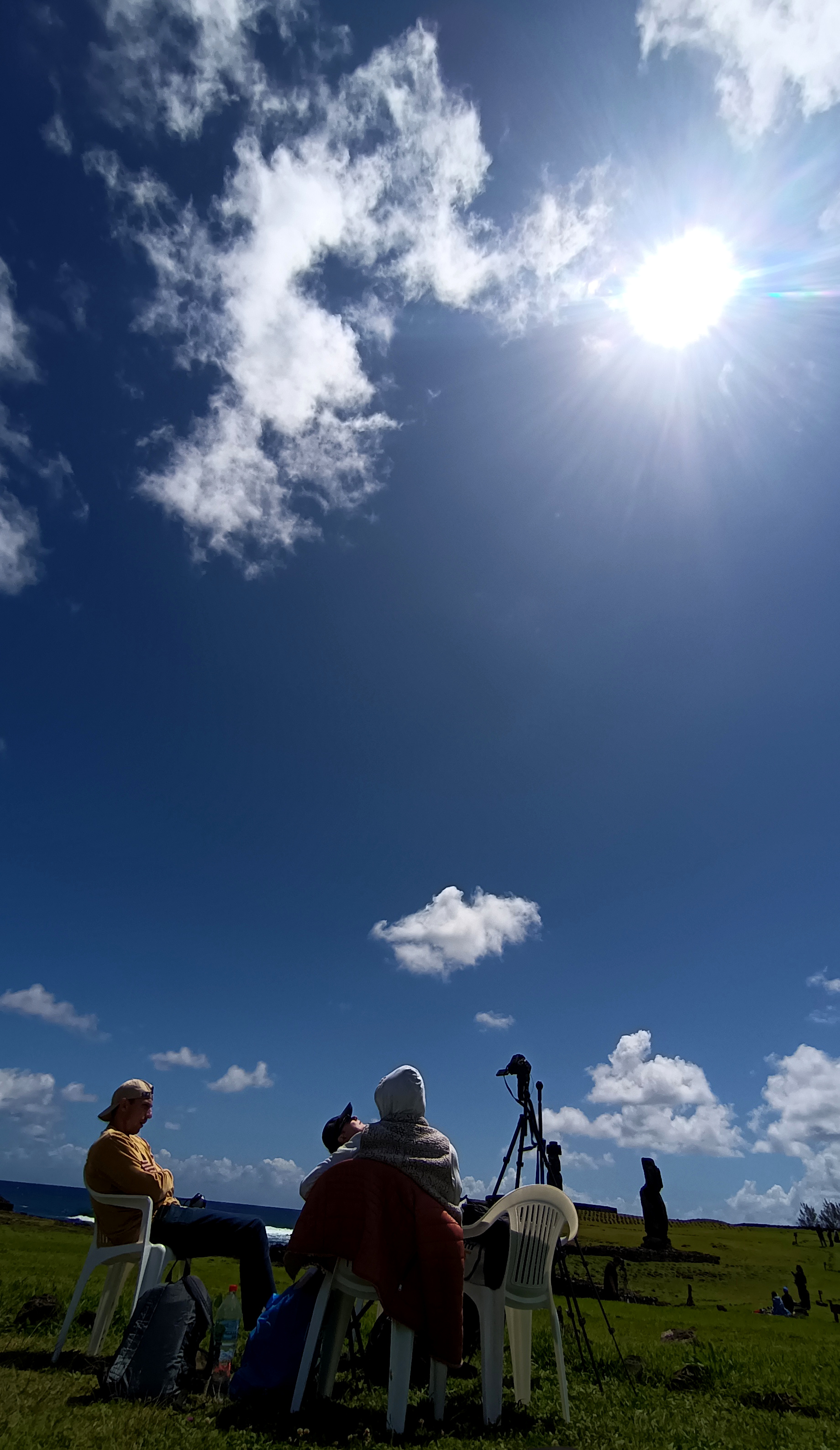
People in Hanga Roa, Easter Island watching the solar eclipse

Partial at sunrise from Maunakea, Hawaii, near Gemini North, showing atmospheric refraction and a green rim.

== Eclipse timing ==
=== Places experiencing annular eclipse ===
Solar Eclipse of October 2, 2024 (Local Times)
Country or territory	City or place	Start of partial eclipse	Start of annular eclipse	Maximum eclipse	End of annular eclipse	End of partial eclipse	Duration of annularity (min:s)	Duration of eclipse (hr:min)	Maximum coverage
Chile	Easter Island	12:23:50	14:04:25	14:07:19	14:10:12	15:52:29	5:47	3:29	87.07%
Argentina	Puerto Deseado	16:06:08	17:27:17	17:29:07	17:30:57	18:44:16	3:40	2:38	85.51%

=== Places experiencing partial eclipse ===
Solar Eclipse of October 2, 2024 (Local Times)
Country or territory	City or place	Start of partial eclipse	Maximum eclipse	End of partial eclipse	Duration of eclipse (hr:min)	Maximum coverage
United States	Honolulu	06:23:07 (sunrise)	06:45:58	07:52:53	1:30	46.91%
United States Minor Outlying Islands	Palmyra Atoll	06:35:43 (sunrise)	06:55:51	08:10:00	1:34	83.59%
Kiribati	Kiritimati (Note: The times listed for this location occur on October 3, 2024, local time.)	06:15:37 (sunrise)	07:01:01	08:18:43	2:03	74.49%
Tokelau	Fakaofo	06:07:55 (sunrise)	06:12:31	07:16:00	1:08	39.13%
Samoa	Apia	06:08:50 (sunrise)	06:18:45	07:18:15	1:09	29.02%
American Samoa	Pago Pago	06:04:27 (sunrise)	06:19:35	07:19:19	1:15	28.32%
Niue	Alofi	05:59:46 (sunrise)	06:27:27	07:22:39	1:23	19.64%
Wallis and Futuna	Mata Utu	05:26:35 (sunrise)	05:28:47	06:15:18	0:49	27.33%
Tonga	Nuku'alofa	06:20:11 (sunrise)	06:29:47	07:19:11	0:59	15.31%
French Polynesia	Taioha'e	06:41:59	08:02:28	09:36:02	2:54	64.39%
Clipperton Island	Clipperton Island	08:24:41	09:32:58	10:47:12	2:23	16.67%
Cook Islands	Rarotonga	06:41:24	07:36:37	08:38:10	1:57	20.21%
French Polynesia	Papeete	06:30:43	07:38:27	08:55:43	2:25	34.18%
United States Minor Outlying Islands	Baker Island	05:31:44 (sunrise)	05:39:16	06:07:35	0:36	25.12%
Tuvalu	Funafuti	05:46:33 (sunrise)	05:48:42	06:11:32	0:25	15.70%
Fiji	Suva	05:46:40 (sunrise)	05:48:56	06:15:14	0:29	12.42%
Pitcairn Islands	Adamstown	08:56:56	10:24:43	12:01:24	3:04	50.87%
Chile	Punta Arenas	16:01:08	17:23:00	18:38:28	2:37	75.49%
Argentina	El Calafate	15:59:02	17:23:25	18:40:37	2:42	83.27%
Antarctica	Orcadas Base	16:16:51	17:25:24	18:23:45 (sunset)	2:07	57.63%
Chile	Santiago	16:02:11	17:25:46	18:39:44	2:38	43.49%
Argentina	Comodoro Rivadavia	16:04:25	17:28:44	18:44:46	2:40	82.21%
Falkland Islands	Stanley	16:12:59	17:30:59	18:42:18	2:29	83.97%
South Georgia and the South Sandwich Islands	King Edward Point	17:23:03	18:32:05	18:43:14 (sunset)	1:20	75.92%
Paraguay	Asunción	15:39:38	16:37:26	17:29:25	1:50	14.82%
Argentina	Buenos Aires	16:23:24	17:37:51	18:44:00	2:21	41.69%
Uruguay	Montevideo	16:26:02	17:39:16	18:44:26	2:23	42.20%
Brazil	Rio Grande	16:34:46	17:41:53	18:31:28 (sunset)	1:57	32.83%
Brazil	Rio de Janeiro	17:01:08	17:42:43	17:52:13 (sunset)	0:51	9.52%
Brazil	São Paulo	16:57:27	17:44:09	18:06:14 (sunset)	1:09	10.44%

== Eclipse details ==
Shown below are two tables displaying details about this particular solar eclipse. The first table outlines times at which the Moon's penumbra or umbra attains the specific parameter, and the second table describes various other parameters pertaining to this eclipse.

October 2, 2024 Solar Eclipse Times
Event	Time (UTC)
First Penumbral External Contact	2024 October 2 at 15:44:08.1 UTC
First Umbral External Contact	2024 October 2 at 17:32:12.9 UTC
First Central Line	2024 October 2 at 16:54:48.8 UTC
First Umbral Internal Contact	2024 October 2 at 16:57:52.5 UTC
First Penumbral Internal Contact	2024 October 2 at 18:16:51.2 UTC
Greatest Eclipse	2024 October 2 at 18:46:13.3 UTC
Ecliptic Conjunction	2024 October 2 at 18:50:26.2 UTC
Greatest Duration	2024 October 2 at 18:54:11.7 UTC
Equatorial Conjunction	2024 October 2 at 19:09:14.7 UTC
Last Penumbral Internal Contact	2024 October 2 at 19:15:02.0 UTC
Last Umbral Internal Contact	2024 October 2 at 20:34:19.4 UTC
Last Central Line	2024 October 2 at 20:37:23.5 UTC
Last Umbral External Contact	2024 October 2 at 20:40:27.0 UTC
Last Penumbral External Contact	2024 October 2 at 21:48:09.7 UTC

October 2, 2024 Solar Eclipse Parameters
Parameter	Value
Eclipse Magnitude	0.93261
Eclipse Obscuration	0.86975
Gamma	−0.35087
Sun Right Ascension	12h36m58.9s
Sun Declination	-03°59'03.9"
Sun Semi-Diameter	15'58.9"
Sun Equatorial Horizontal Parallax	08.8"
Moon Right Ascension	12h36m22.3s
Moon Declination	-04°15'35.4"
Moon Semi-Diameter	14'41.8"
Moon Equatorial Horizontal Parallax	0°53'56.4"
ΔT	71.7 s

== Eclipse season ==
This eclipse is part of an eclipse season, a period, roughly every six months, when eclipses occur. Only two (or occasionally three) eclipse seasons occur each year, and each season lasts about 35 days and repeats just short of six months (173 days) later; thus two full eclipse seasons always occur each year. Either two or three eclipses happen each eclipse season. In the sequence below, each eclipse is separated by a fortnight.

Eclipse season of September–October 2024
September 18 Ascending node (full moon)	October 2 Descending node (new moon)
Partial lunar eclipse Lunar Saros 118	Annular solar eclipse Solar Saros 144

== Related eclipses ==
=== Eclipses in 2024 ===
- A penumbral lunar eclipse on March 25.
- A total solar eclipse on April 8.
- A partial lunar eclipse on September 18.
- An annular solar eclipse on October 2.

=== Metonic ===
- Preceded by: Solar eclipse of December 14, 2020
- Followed by: Solar eclipse of July 22, 2028

=== Tzolkinex ===
- Preceded by: Solar eclipse of August 21, 2017
- Followed by: Solar eclipse of November 14, 2031

=== Half-Saros ===
- Preceded by: Lunar eclipse of September 28, 2015
- Followed by: Lunar eclipse of October 8, 2033

=== Tritos ===
- Preceded by: Solar eclipse of November 3, 2013
- Followed by: Solar eclipse of September 2, 2035

=== Solar Saros 144 ===
- Preceded by: Solar eclipse of September 22, 2006
- Followed by: Solar eclipse of October 14, 2042

=== Inex ===
- Preceded by: Solar eclipse of October 24, 1995
- Followed by: Solar eclipse of September 12, 2053

=== Triad ===
- Preceded by: Solar eclipse of December 2, 1937
- Followed by: Solar eclipse of August 4, 2111

=== Solar eclipses of 2022–2025 ===
Solar eclipse series sets from 2022 to 2025
Ascending node			Descending node		
Saros	Map	Gamma	Saros	Map	Gamma
119 Partial in CTIO, Chile	April 30, 2022 Partial	−1.19008	124 Partial from Saratov, Russia	October 25, 2022 Partial	1.07014
129 Totality from Exmouth, WA	April 20, 2023 Hybrid	−0.39515	134 Mexican Hat, UT	October 14, 2023 Annular	0.37534
139 Totality in Dallas, TX	April 8, 2024 Total	0.34314	144 Tres Cerros, Argentina	October 2, 2024 Annular	−0.35087
149 Partial from Halifax, NS	March 29, 2025 Partial	1.04053	154	September 21, 2025 Partial	−1.06509

=== Saros 144 ===
This eclipse is a part of Saros series 144, repeating every 18 years, 11 days, and containing 70 events. The series started with a partial solar eclipse on April 11, 1736. It contains annular eclipses from July 7, 1880 through August 27, 2565. There are no hybrid or total eclipses in this set. The series ends at member 70 as a partial eclipse on May 5, 2980. Its eclipses are tabulated in three columns; every third eclipse in the same column is one exeligmos apart, so they all cast shadows over approximately the same parts of the Earth.

The longest duration of annularity will be produced by member 51 at 9 minutes, 52 seconds on December 29, 2168. All eclipses in this series occur at the Moon’s descending node of orbit.

Series members 5–26 occur between 1801 and 2200:
5	6	7
May 25, 1808	June 5, 1826	June 16, 1844
8	9	10
June 27, 1862	July 7, 1880	July 18, 1898
11	12	13
July 30, 1916	August 10, 1934	August 20, 1952
14	15	16
August 31, 1970	September 11, 1988	September 22, 2006
17	18	19
October 2, 2024	October 14, 2042	October 24, 2060
20	21	22
November 4, 2078	November 15, 2096	November 27, 2114
23	24	25
December 7, 2132	December 19, 2150	December 29, 2168
26
January 9, 2187

=== Metonic series ===
The metonic series repeats eclipses every 19 years (6939.69 days), lasting about 5 cycles. Eclipses occur in nearly the same calendar date. In addition, the octon subseries repeats 1/5 of that or every 3.8 years (1387.94 days). All eclipses in this table occur at the Moon's descending node.

21 eclipse events between July 22, 1971 and July 22, 2047
July 22	May 9–11	February 26–27	December 14–15	October 2–3
116	118	120	122	124
July 22, 1971	May 11, 1975	February 26, 1979	December 15, 1982	October 3, 1986
126	128	130	132	134
July 22, 1990	May 10, 1994	February 26, 1998	December 14, 2001	October 3, 2005
136	138	140	142	144
July 22, 2009	May 10, 2013	February 26, 2017	December 14, 2020	October 2, 2024
146	148	150	152	154
July 22, 2028	May 9, 2032	February 27, 2036	December 15, 2039	October 3, 2043
156
July 22, 2047

=== Tritos series ===
This eclipse is a part of a tritos cycle, repeating at alternating nodes every 135 synodic months (≈ 3986.63 days, or 11 years minus 1 month). Their appearance and longitude are irregular due to a lack of synchronization with the anomalistic month (period of perigee), but groupings of 3 tritos cycles (≈ 33 years minus 3 months) come close (≈ 434.044 anomalistic months), so eclipses are similar in these groupings.

Series members between 1801 and 2200
June 16, 1806 (Saros 124)	May 16, 1817 (Saros 125)	April 14, 1828 (Saros 126)	March 15, 1839 (Saros 127)	February 12, 1850 (Saros 128)
January 11, 1861 (Saros 129)	December 12, 1871 (Saros 130)	November 10, 1882 (Saros 131)	October 9, 1893 (Saros 132)	September 9, 1904 (Saros 133)
August 10, 1915 (Saros 134)	July 9, 1926 (Saros 135)	June 8, 1937 (Saros 136)	May 9, 1948 (Saros 137)	April 8, 1959 (Saros 138)
March 7, 1970 (Saros 139)	February 4, 1981 (Saros 140)	January 4, 1992 (Saros 141)	December 4, 2002 (Saros 142)	November 3, 2013 (Saros 143)
October 2, 2024 (Saros 144)	September 2, 2035 (Saros 145)	August 2, 2046 (Saros 146)	July 1, 2057 (Saros 147)	May 31, 2068 (Saros 148)
May 1, 2079 (Saros 149)	March 31, 2090 (Saros 150)	February 28, 2101 (Saros 151)	January 29, 2112 (Saros 152)	December 28, 2122 (Saros 153)
November 26, 2133 (Saros 154)	October 26, 2144 (Saros 155)	September 26, 2155 (Saros 156)	August 25, 2166 (Saros 157)	July 25, 2177 (Saros 158)
June 24, 2188 (Saros 159)	May 24, 2199 (Saros 160)			

=== Inex series ===
This eclipse is a part of the long period inex cycle, repeating at alternating nodes, every 358 synodic months (≈ 10,571.95 days, or 29 years minus 20 days). Their appearance and longitude are irregular due to a lack of synchronization with the anomalistic month (period of perigee). However, groupings of 3 inex cycles (≈ 87 years minus 2 months) comes close (≈ 1,151.02 anomalistic months), so eclipses are similar in these groupings.

Series members between 1801 and 2200
February 21, 1822 (Saros 137)	February 1, 1851 (Saros 138)	January 11, 1880 (Saros 139)
December 23, 1908 (Saros 140)	December 2, 1937 (Saros 141)	November 12, 1966 (Saros 142)
October 24, 1995 (Saros 143)	October 2, 2024 (Saros 144)	September 12, 2053 (Saros 145)
August 24, 2082 (Saros 146)	August 4, 2111 (Saros 147)	July 14, 2140 (Saros 148)
June 25, 2169 (Saros 149)	June 4, 2198 (Saros 150)	

== See also ==
- List of solar eclipses in the 21st century
- Solar eclipse of December 14, 2020
