= 2015 lunar eclipse =

There are two total lunar eclipses occurring in 2015:

- April 2015 lunar eclipse
- September 2015 lunar eclipse
