= September 2015 lunar eclipse =

Total lunar eclipse of 27 September 2015

- Total eclipse
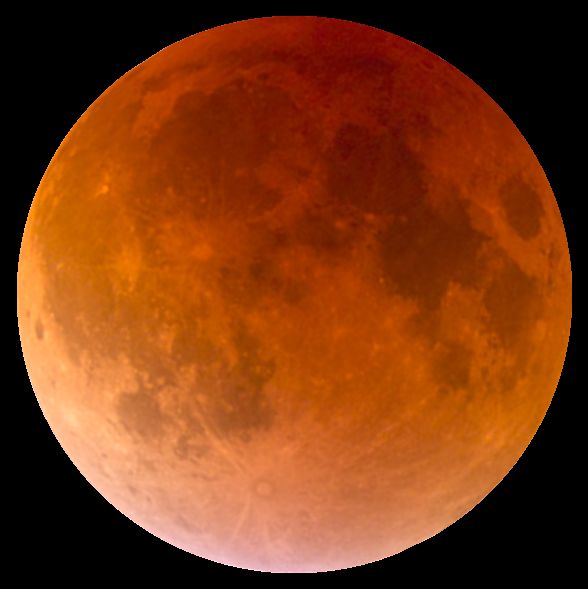
- Totality as viewed from Murrieta, California, 2:52 UTC
- Date: September 28, 2015
- Gamma: −0.3296
- Magnitude: 1.2774
- Saros cycle: 137 (28 of 81)
- Totality: 71 minutes, 55 seconds
- Partiality: 199 minutes, 52 seconds
- Penumbral: 310 minutes, 41 seconds
Contacts (UTC)
- P1: 0:11:47
- U1: 1:07:11
- U2: 2:11:10
- Greatest: 2:47:08
- U3: 3:23:05
- U4: 4:27:03
- P4: 5:22:27

A total lunar eclipse occurred at the Moon’s descending node of orbit on Monday, September 28, 2015, with an umbral magnitude of 1.2774. A lunar eclipse occurs when the Moon moves into the Earth's shadow, causing the Moon to be darkened. A total lunar eclipse occurs when the Moon's near side entirely passes into the Earth's umbral shadow. Unlike a solar eclipse, which can only be viewed from a relatively small area of the world, a lunar eclipse may be viewed from anywhere on the night side of Earth. A total lunar eclipse can last up to nearly two hours, while a total solar eclipse lasts only a few minutes at any given place, because the Moon's shadow is smaller. Occurring only about 5 hours after perigee (on September 27, 2015, at 21:45 UTC), the Moon's apparent diameter was larger.

This lunar eclipse is the last of a tetrad, with four total lunar eclipses in series, the others being on April 15, 2014; October 8, 2014; and April 4, 2015.

The Moon appeared larger than normal, because the Moon was just 1 hour past its closest approach to Earth in 2015 at mid-eclipse, sometimes called a supermoon. The Moon's apparent diameter was larger than 34' viewed straight overhead, just off the coast of northeast Brazil.

The total lunar eclipse was darker than expected, possibly due to ash left behind from eruptions of the Calbuco volcano in April 2015.

== Background ==
This animated video explains the September 2015 supermoon lunar eclipse.

A lunar eclipse occurs when the Moon passes within Earth's umbra (shadow). As the eclipse begins, Earth's shadow first darkens the Moon slightly. Then, the shadow begins to "cover" part of the Moon, turning it a dark red-brown color (typically – the color can vary based on atmospheric conditions). The Moon appears to be reddish because of Rayleigh scattering (the same effect that causes sunsets to appear reddish) and the refraction of that light by Earth's atmosphere into its umbra.

The following simulation shows the approximate appearance of the Moon passing through Earth's shadow. The Moon's brightness is exaggerated within the umbral shadow. The northern portion of the Moon was closest to the center of the shadow, making it darkest, and most red in appearance.

== Supermoon ==
This eclipsed Moon appeared 12.9% larger in diameter than the April 2015 lunar eclipse, measured as 29.66' and 33.47' in diameter from Earth's center, as compared in these simulated images.

A supermoon is the coincidence of a full moon or a new moon with the closest approach the Moon makes to the Earth on its elliptical orbit, resulting in the largest apparent size of the lunar disk as seen from Earth. This was the last supermoon lunar eclipse until January 31, 2018.

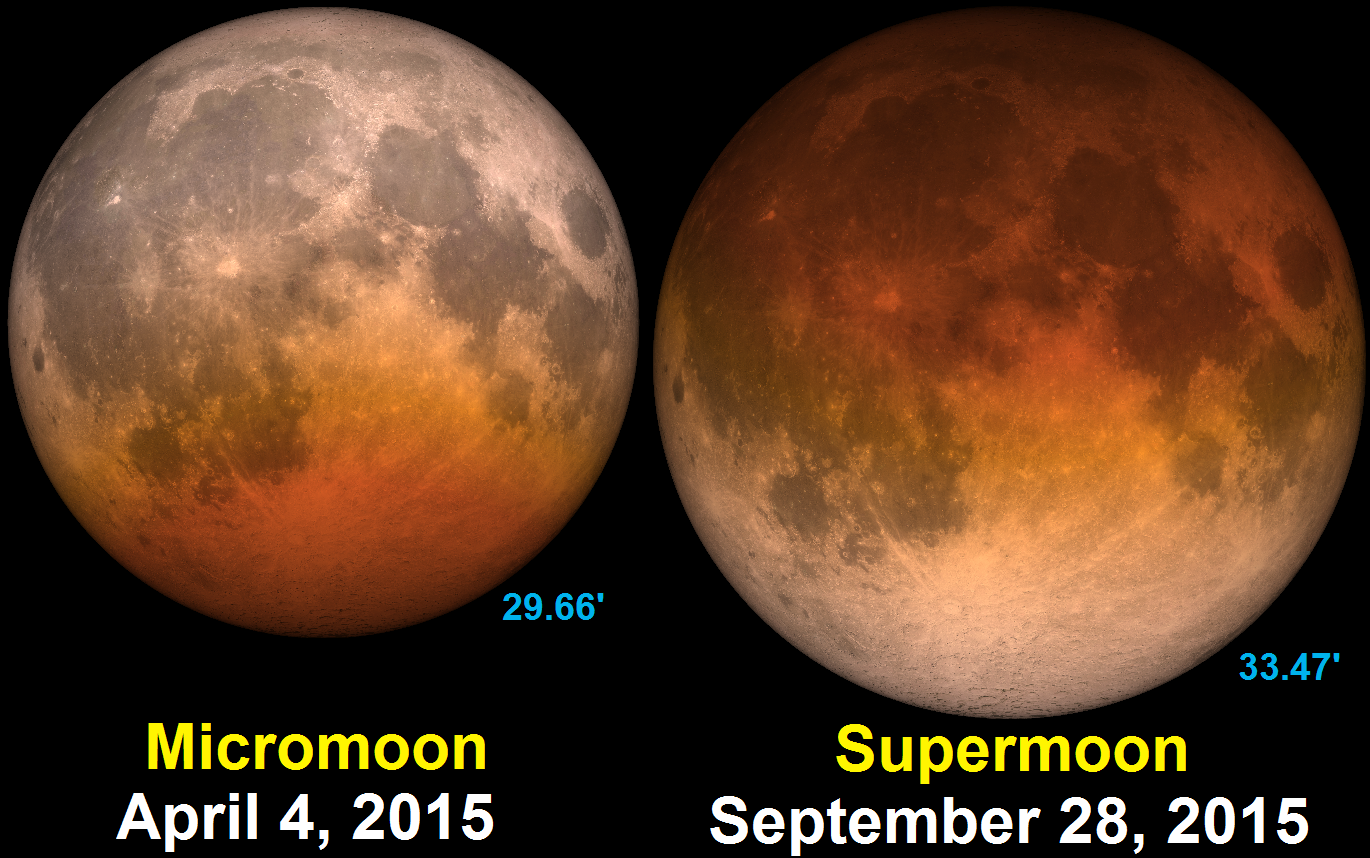

== Visibility ==
The eclipse was completely visible over eastern North America, South America, west Africa, and western Europe, seen rising over western North America and the eastern Pacific Ocean and setting over east Africa, eastern Europe, and west and central Asia.

Hourly motion shown right to left	Simulated appearance of Earth and atmospheric ring of sunlight	The Moon's hourly motion across the Earth's shadow in the constellation of Pisces.
Visibility map

== Timing ==
Local times of contacts
Time Zone adjustments from UTC		-7_{h}	-6_{h}	-5_{h}	-4_{h}	-3_{h}	-2_{h}	-1_{h}	0_{h}	+1_{h}	+2_{h}	+3_{h}
Time Zone adjustments from UTC		PDT MST	MDT	CDT PET	EDT BOT	ADT AMST ART			GMT WET	WEST CET BST	CEST EET MSK−1	EEST FET MSK
Event		Evening 27 September							Morning 28 September			
P1	Penumbral begins*	N/A†	N/A†	7:12 pm	8:12 pm	9:12 pm	10:12 pm	11:12 pm	12:12 am	1:12 am	2:12 am	3:12 am
U1	Partial begins	N/A†	7:07 pm	8:07 pm	9:07 pm	10:07 pm	11:07 pm	12:07 am	1:07 am	2:07 am	3:07 am	4:07 am
U2	Total begins	7:11 pm	8:11 pm	9:11 pm	10:11 pm	11:11 pm	12:11 am	1:11 am	2:11 am	3:11 am	4:11 am	5:11 am
	Mid-eclipse	7:47 pm	8:47 pm	9:47 pm	10:47 pm	11:47 pm	12:47 am	1:47 am	2:47 am	3:47 am	4:47 am	5:47 am
U3	Total ends	8:23 pm	9:23 pm	10:23 pm	11:23 pm	12:23 am	1:23 am	2:23 am	3:23 am	4:23 am	5:23 am	6:23 am
U4	Partial ends	9:27 pm	10:27 pm	11:27 pm	12:27 am	1:27 am	2:27 am	3:27 am	4:27 am	5:27 am	6:27 am	Set
P4	Penumbral ends	10:22 pm	11:22 pm	12:22 am	1:22 am	2:22 am	3:22 am	4:22 am	5:22 am	6:22 am	Set	Set

† The Moon was not visible during this part of the eclipse in this time zone.

* The penumbral phase of the eclipse changes the appearance of the Moon only slightly and is generally not noticeable.

Contact points relative to Earth's umbral and penumbral shadows, here with the Moon near its descending node

The timing of total lunar eclipses are determined by its contacts:
- P1 (First contact): Beginning of the penumbral eclipse. Earth's penumbra touches the Moon's outer limb.
- U1 (Second contact): Beginning of the partial eclipse. Earth's umbra touches the Moon's outer limb.
- U2 (Third contact): Beginning of the total eclipse. The Moon's surface is entirely within Earth's umbra.
- Greatest eclipse: The peak stage of the total eclipse. The Moon is at its closest to the center of Earth's umbra.
- U3 (Fourth contact): End of the total eclipse. The Moon's outer limb exits Earth's umbra.
- U4 (Fifth contact): End of the partial eclipse. Earth's umbra leaves the Moon's surface.
- P4 (Sixth contact): End of the penumbral eclipse. Earth's penumbra no longer makes contact with the Moon.

== Gallery ==
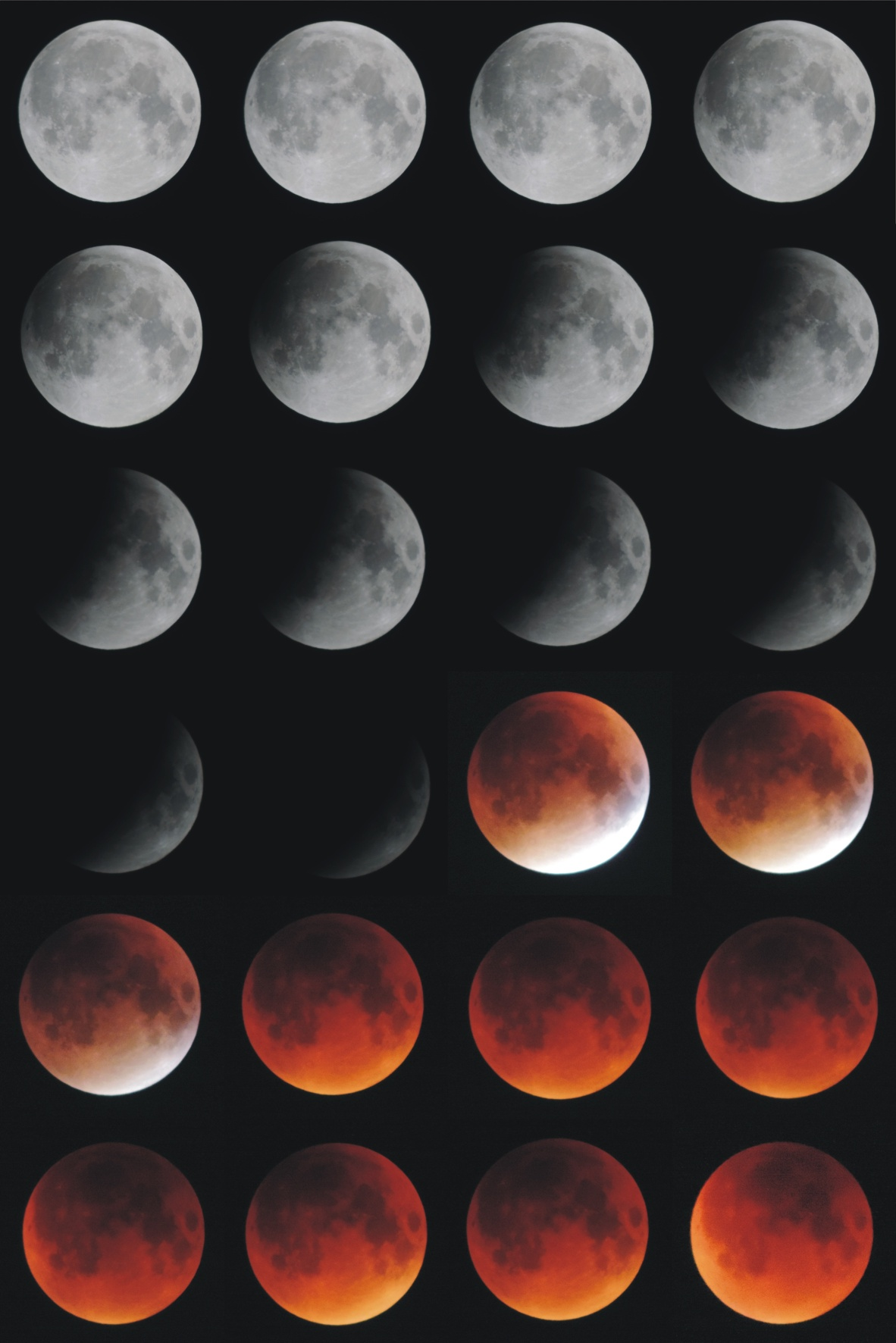
The stages of the Lunar eclipse from Staffordshire, UK

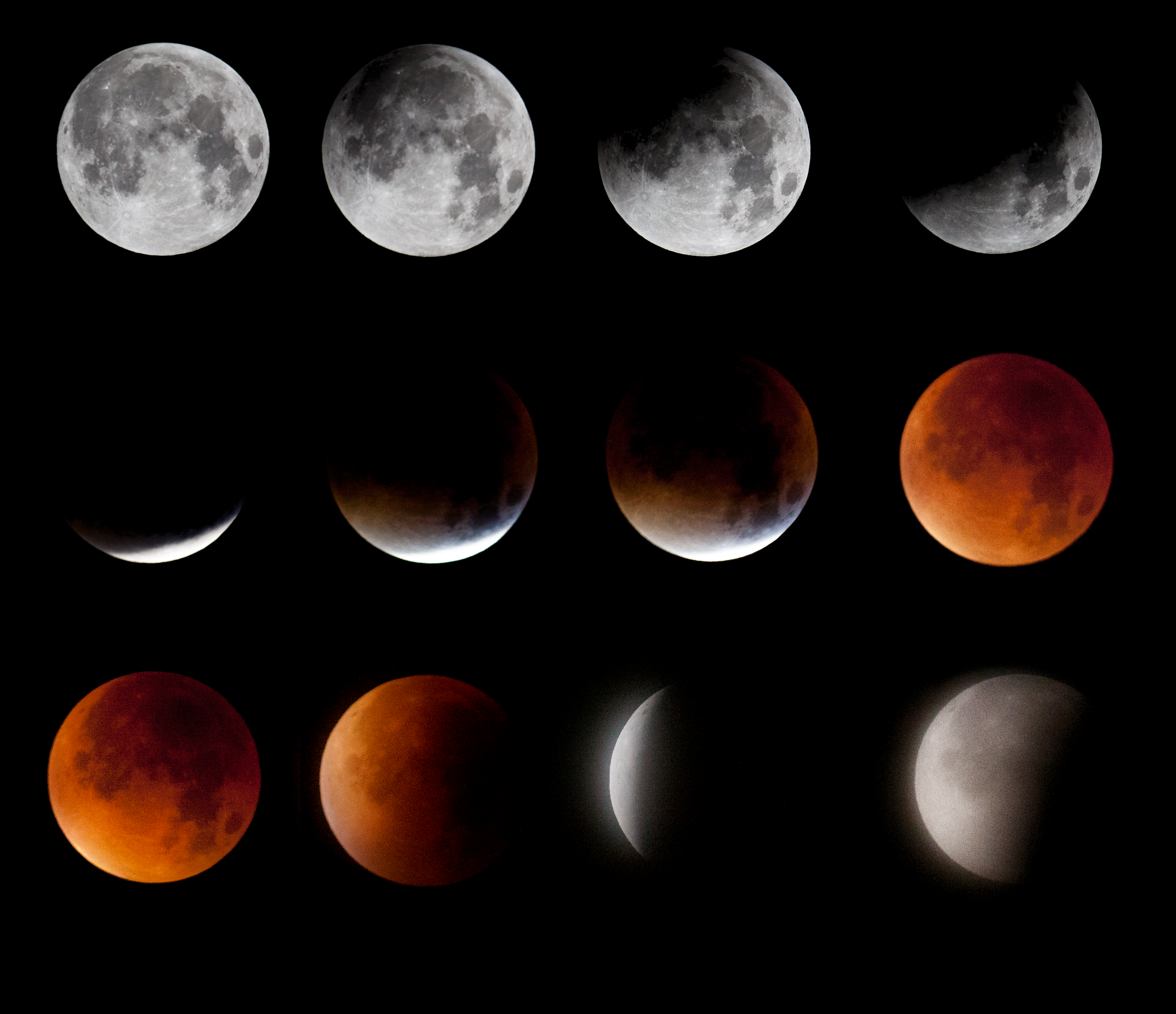
Time-lapse images from Oslo, Norway

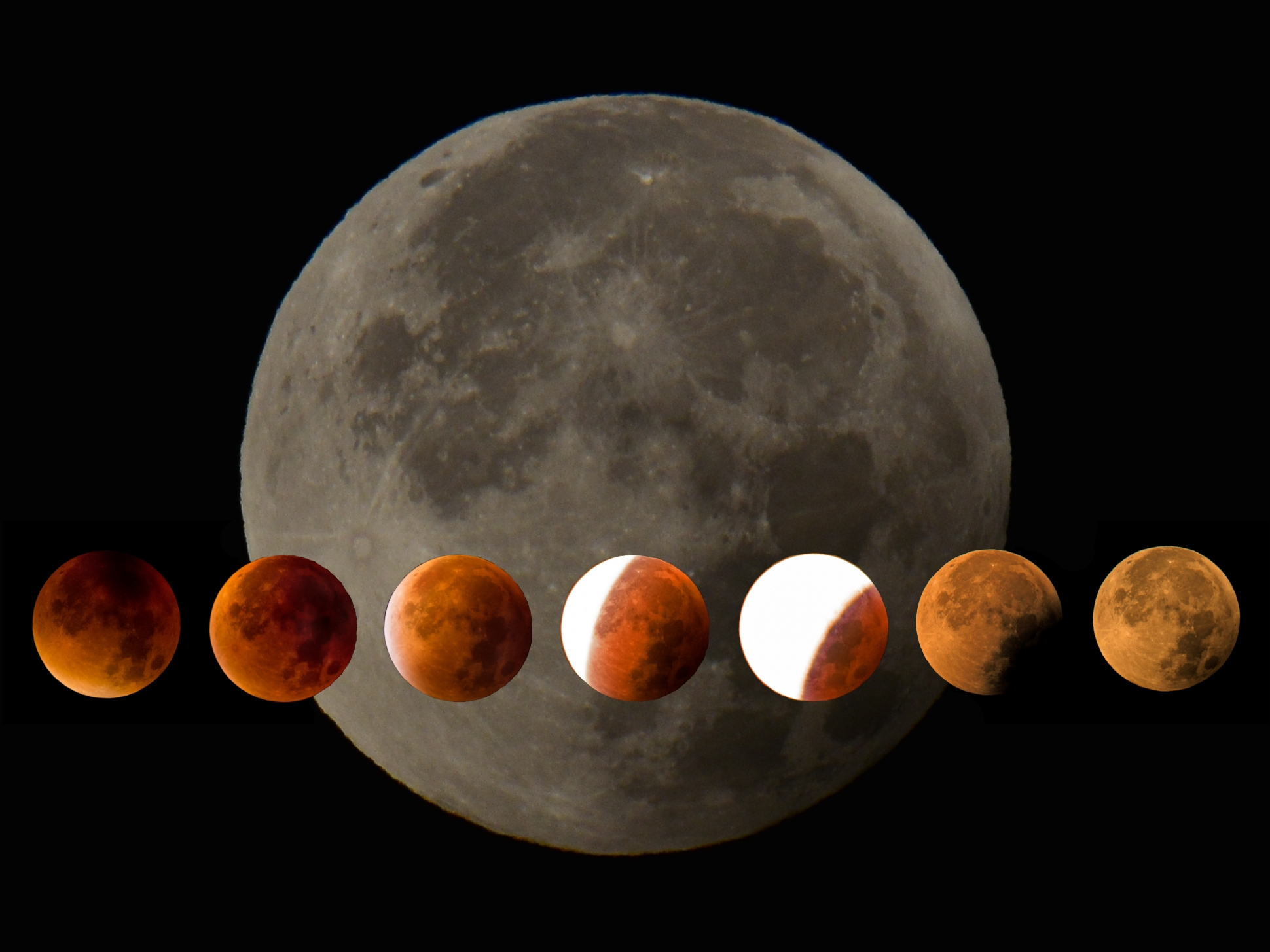
Time-lapse images from Bregenz, Austria

Warsaw, Poland, 2:01 - 2:16 UTC

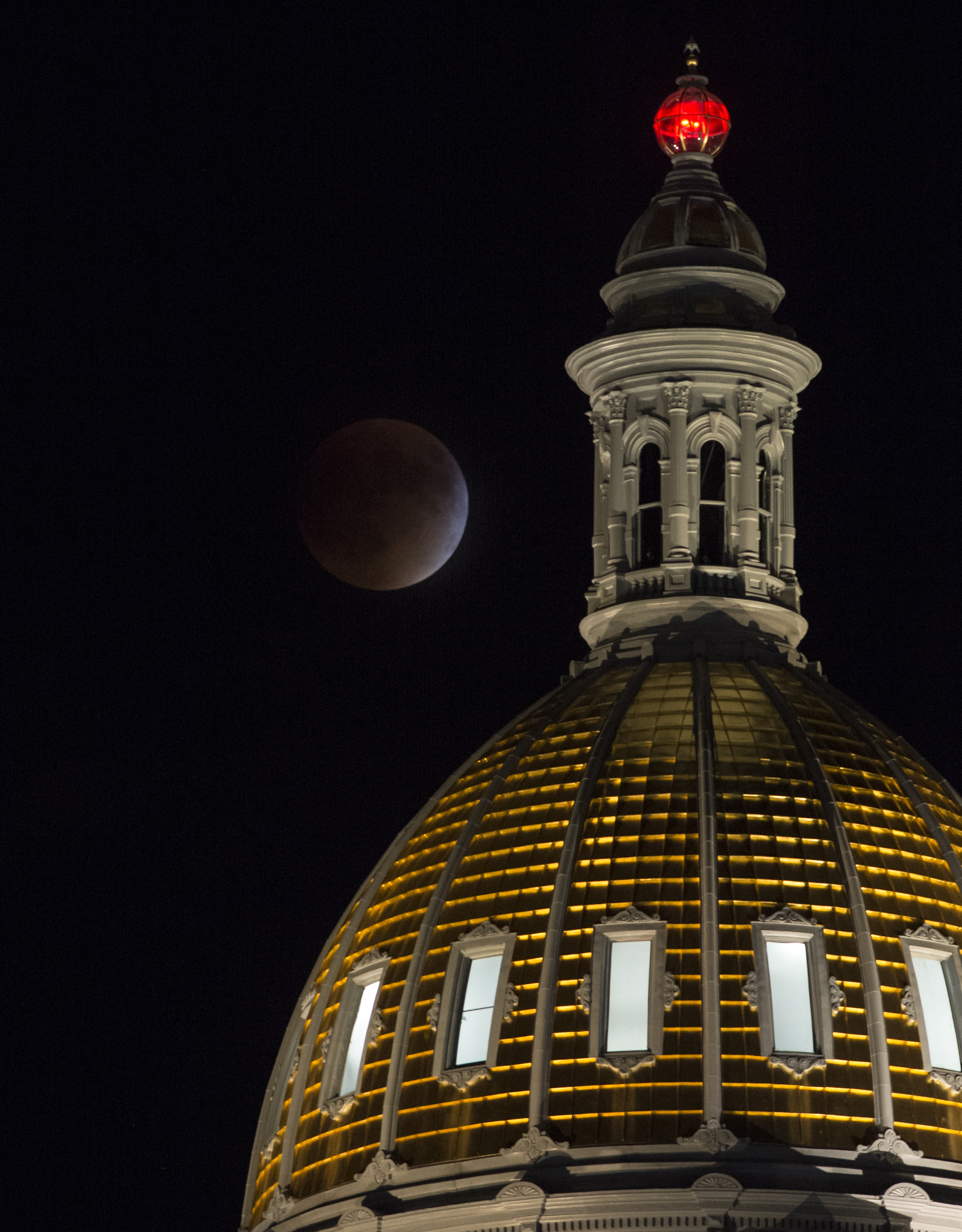
Denver, Colorado, 2:15 UTC

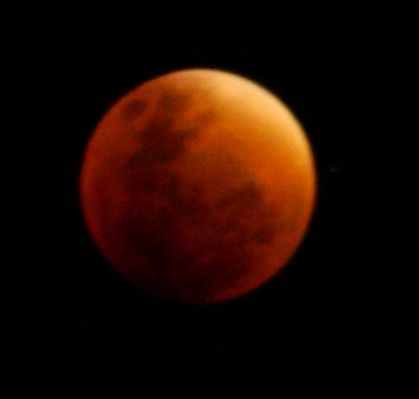
Fray Bentos, Uruguay 2:28 UTC

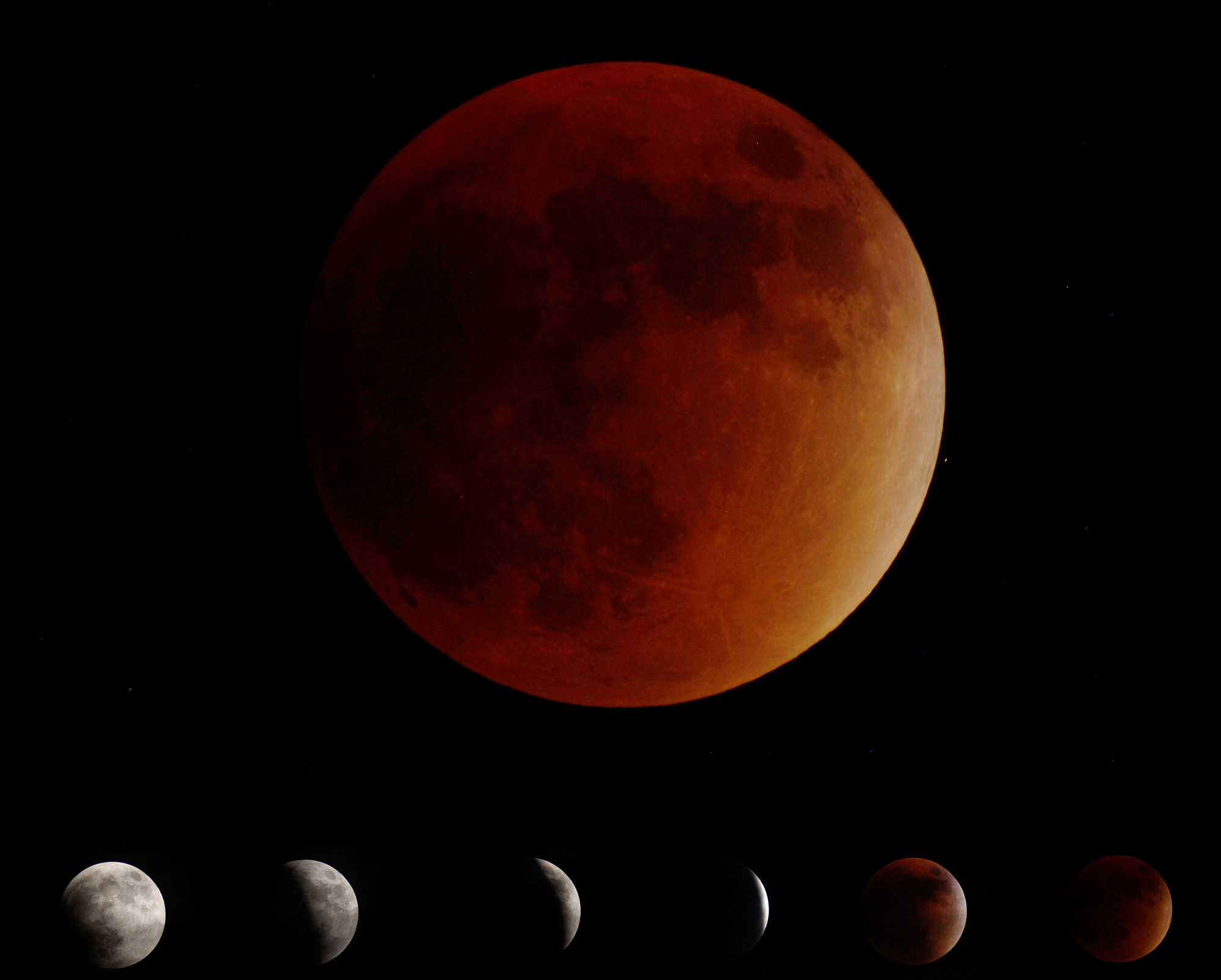
Tampa, Florida, 2:30 UTC

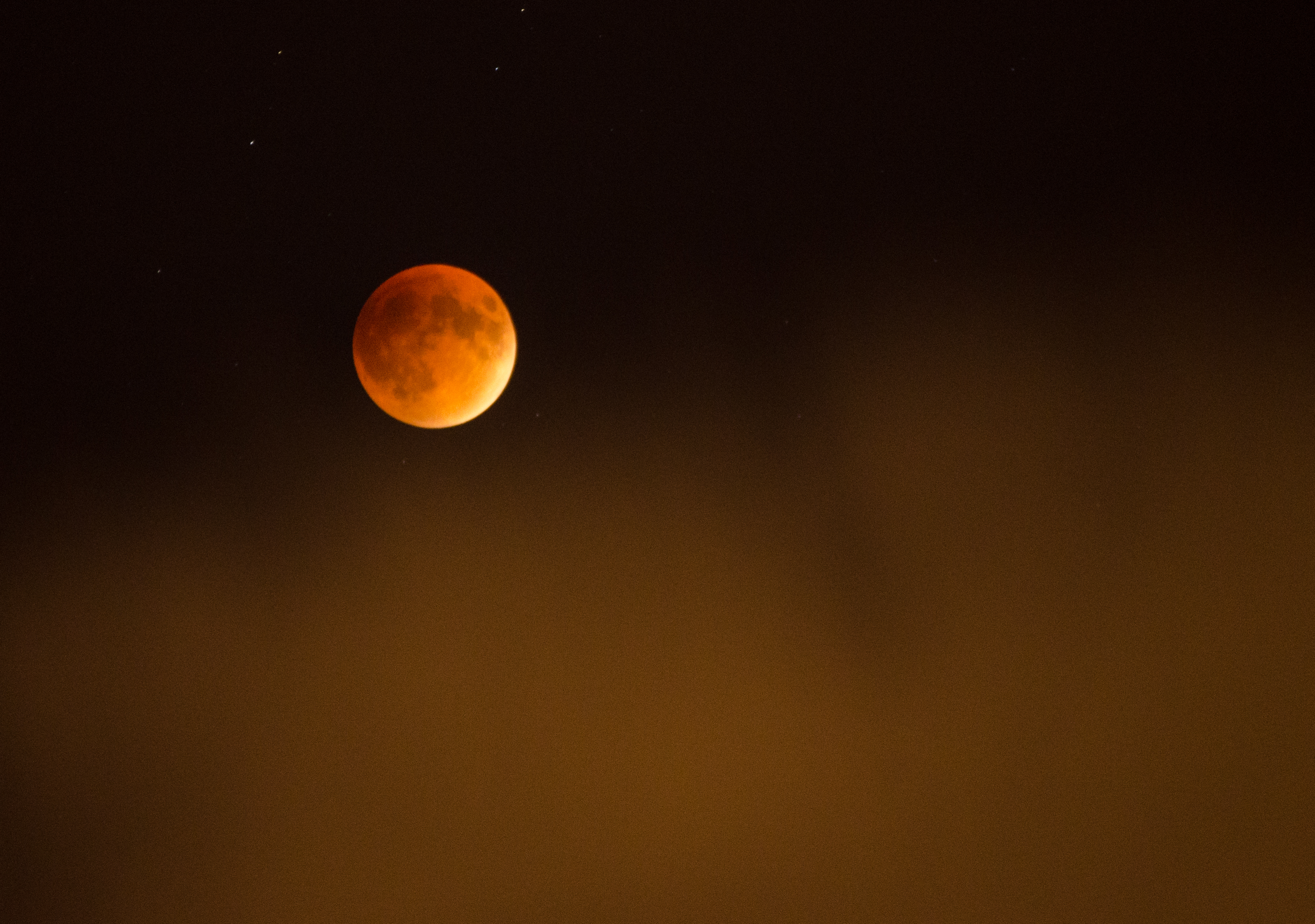
New York City, New York, 2:36 UTC

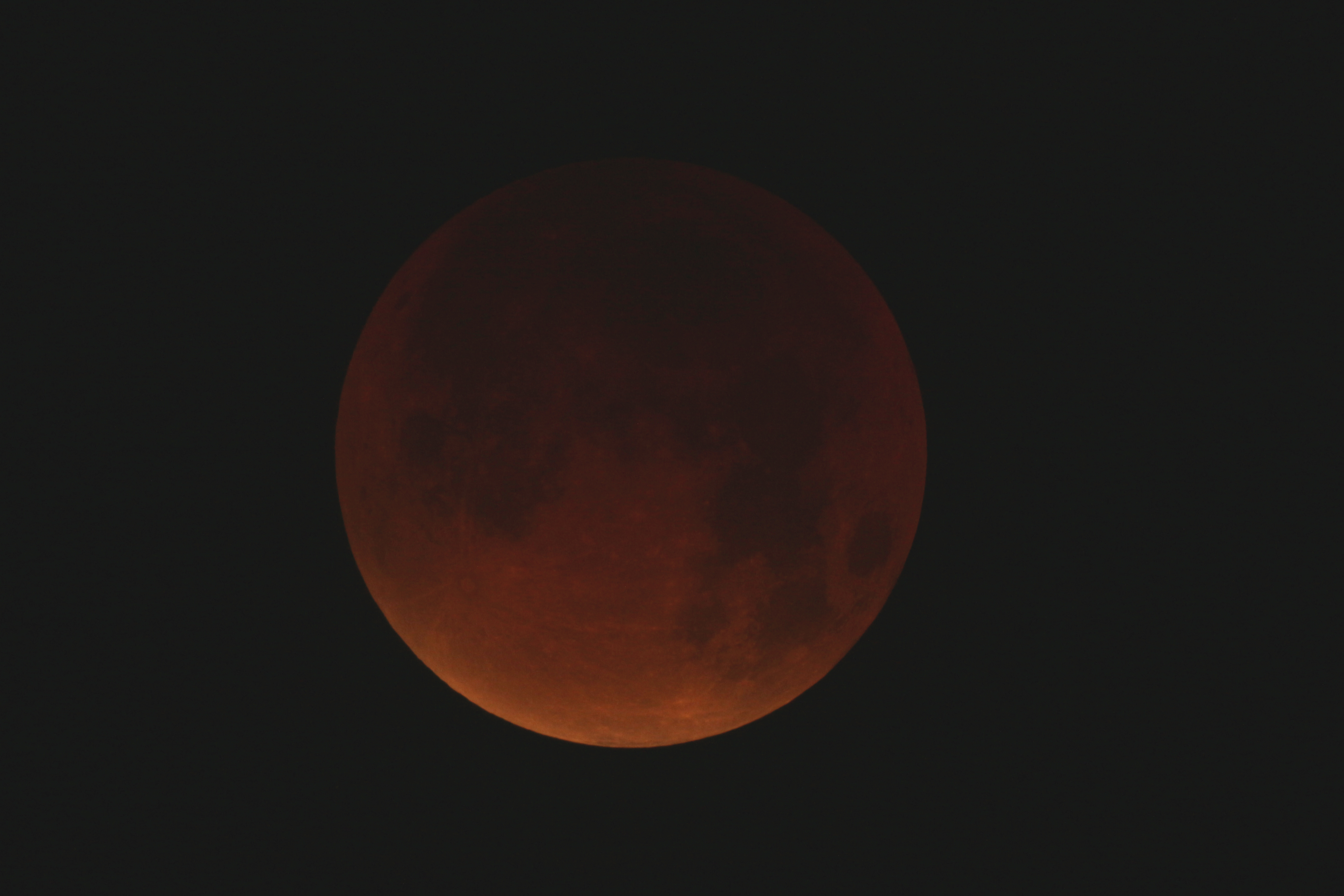
Wrocław, Poland, 2:36 UTC

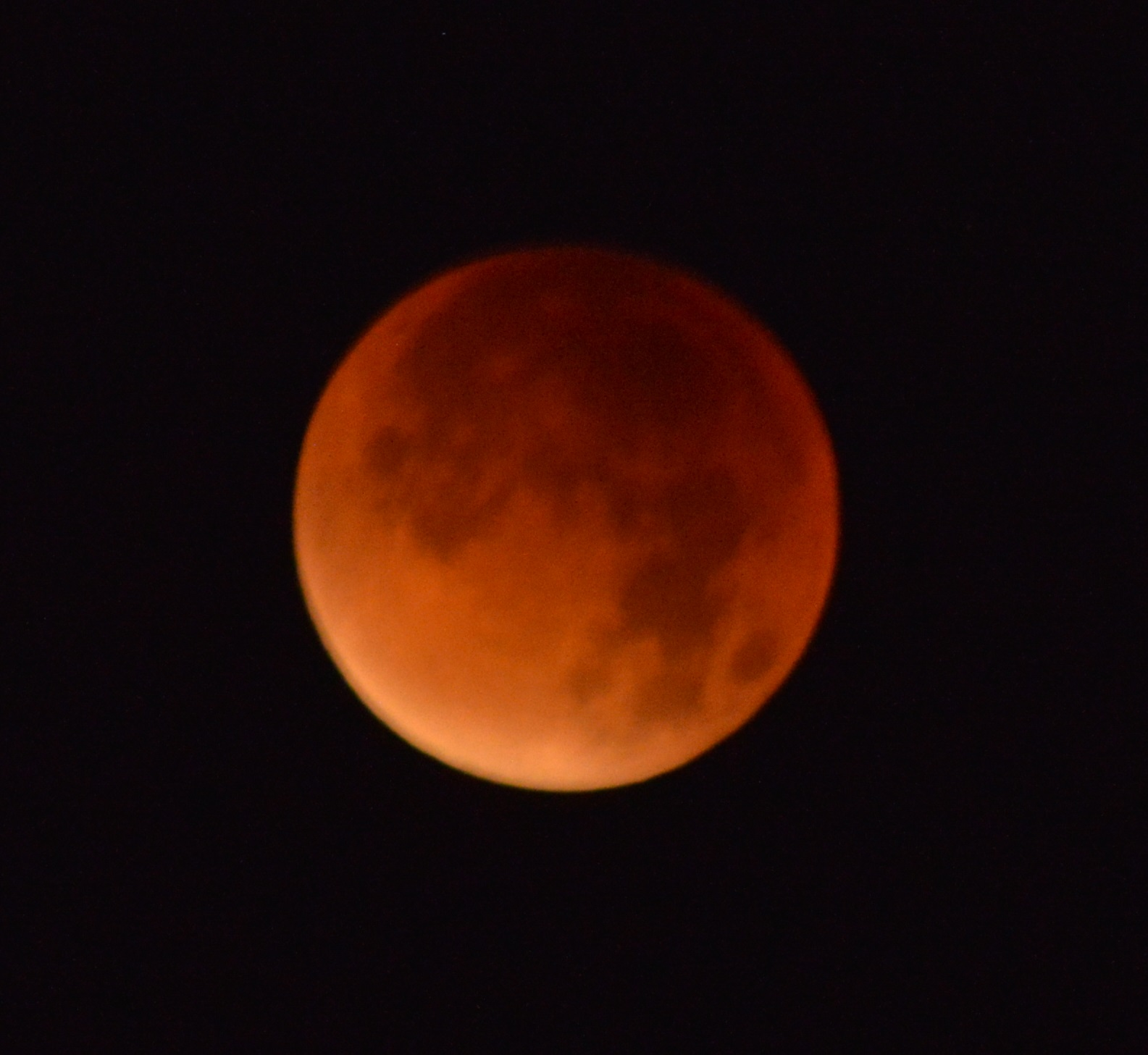
Zürich, Switzerland, 2:36 UTC

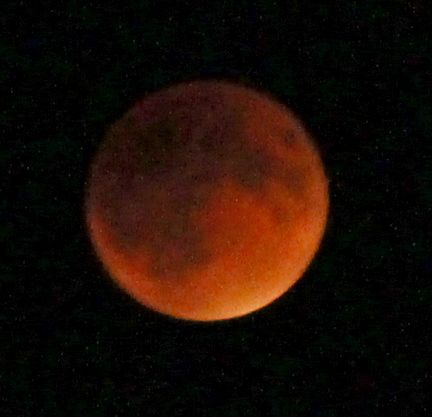
Coralville, Iowa, 2:52 UTC

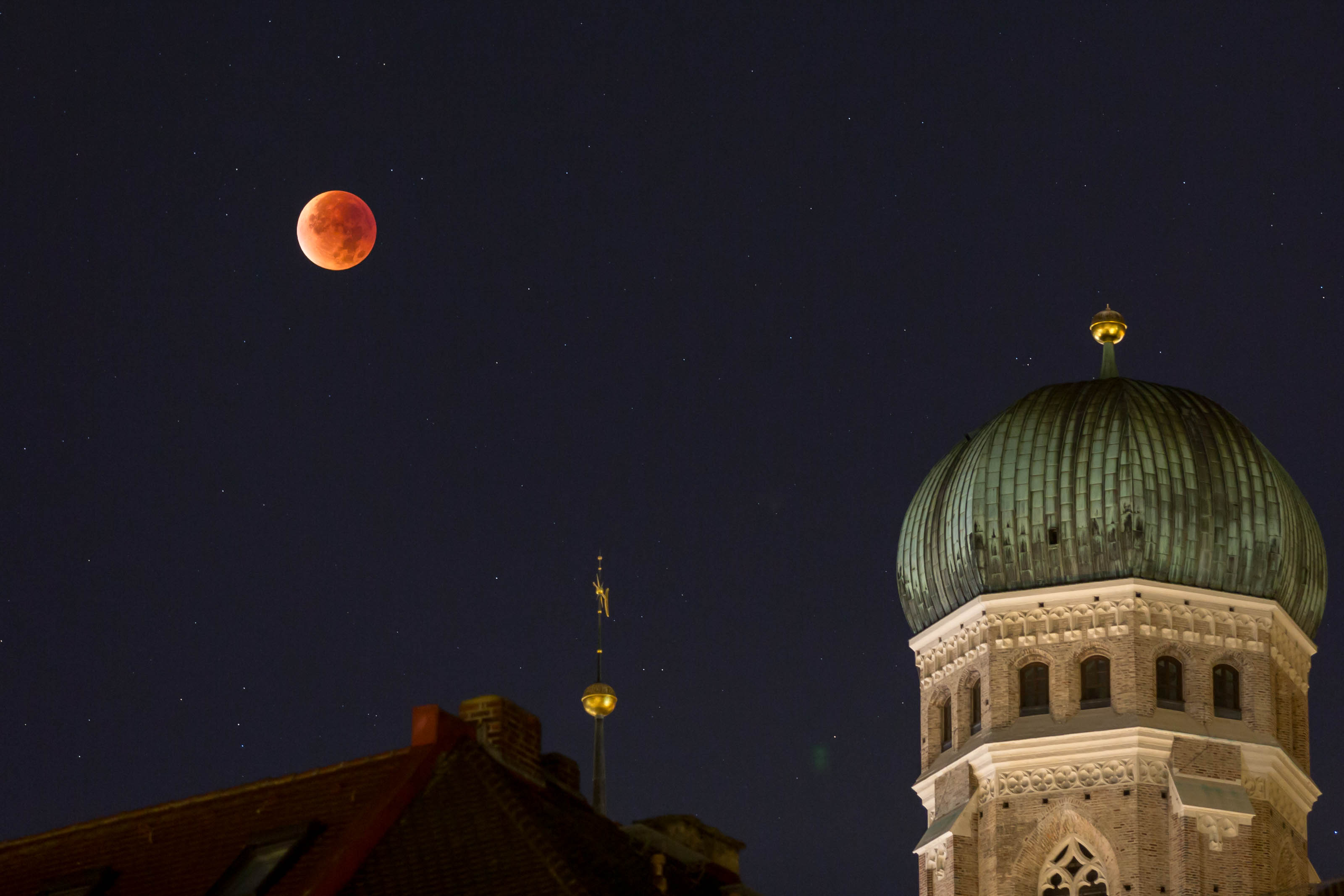
Munich, Germany, 2:55 UTC

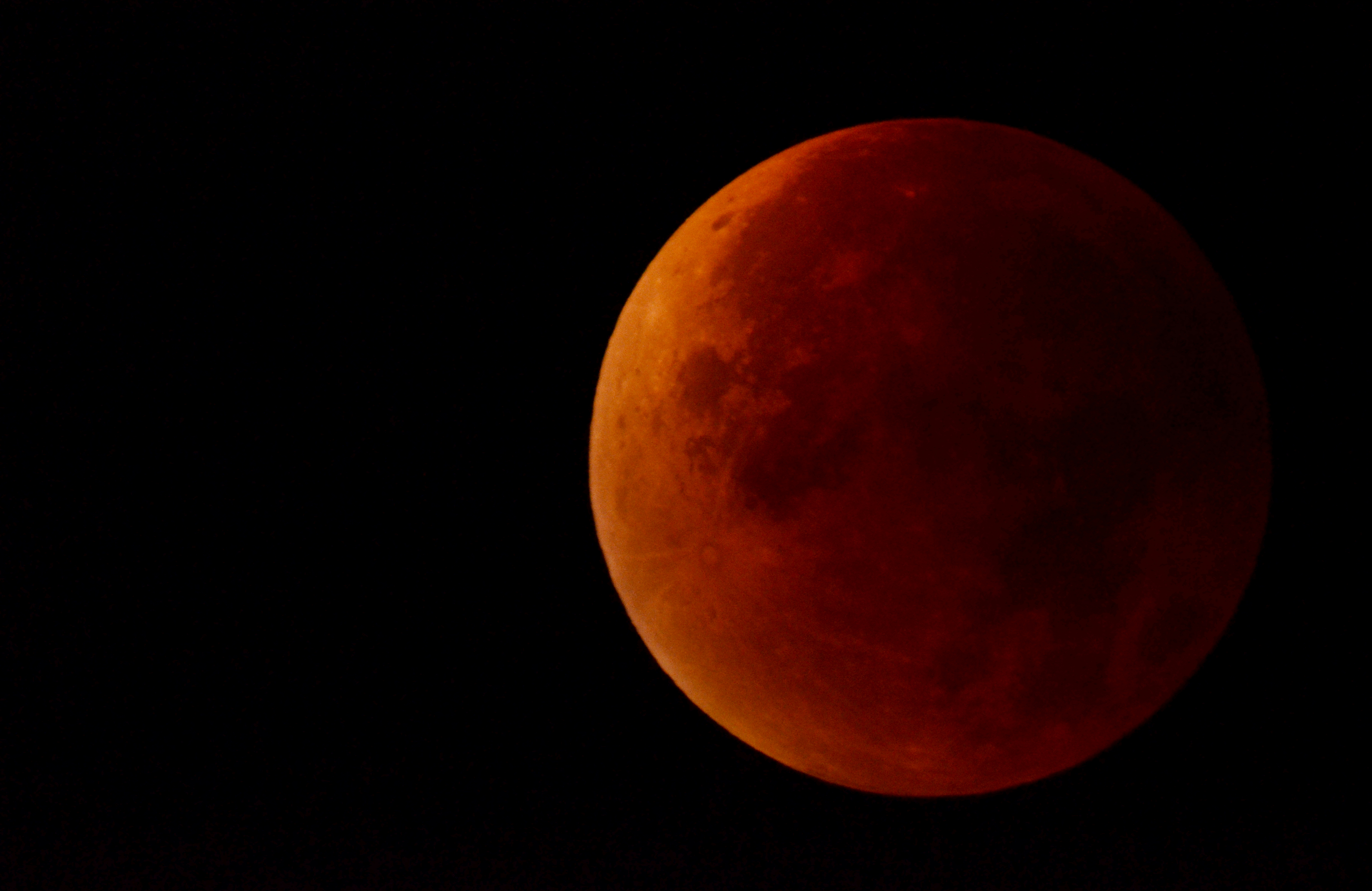
Sitia, Greece, 3:01 UTC

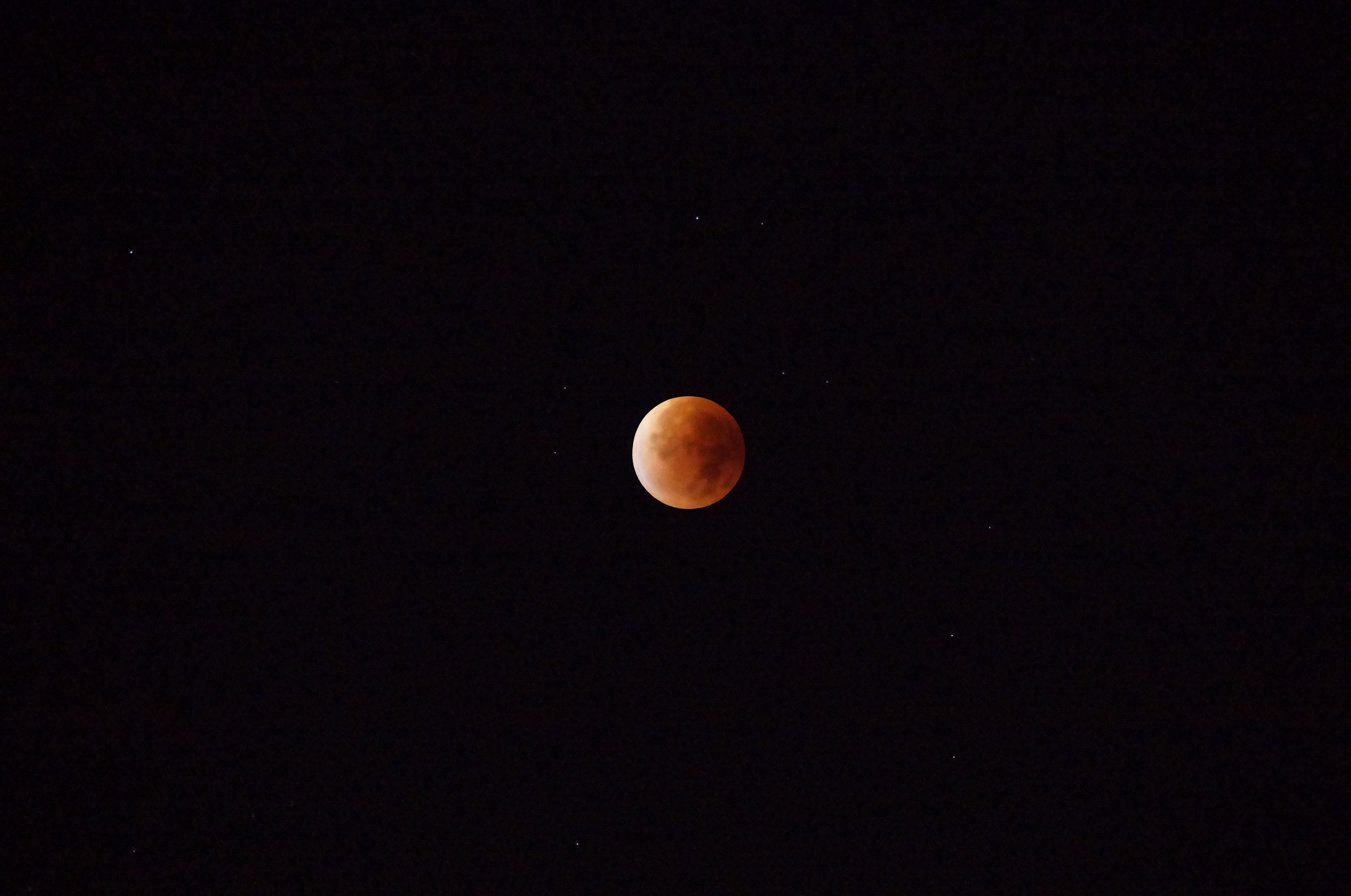
Berlin, Germany, 3:05 UTC

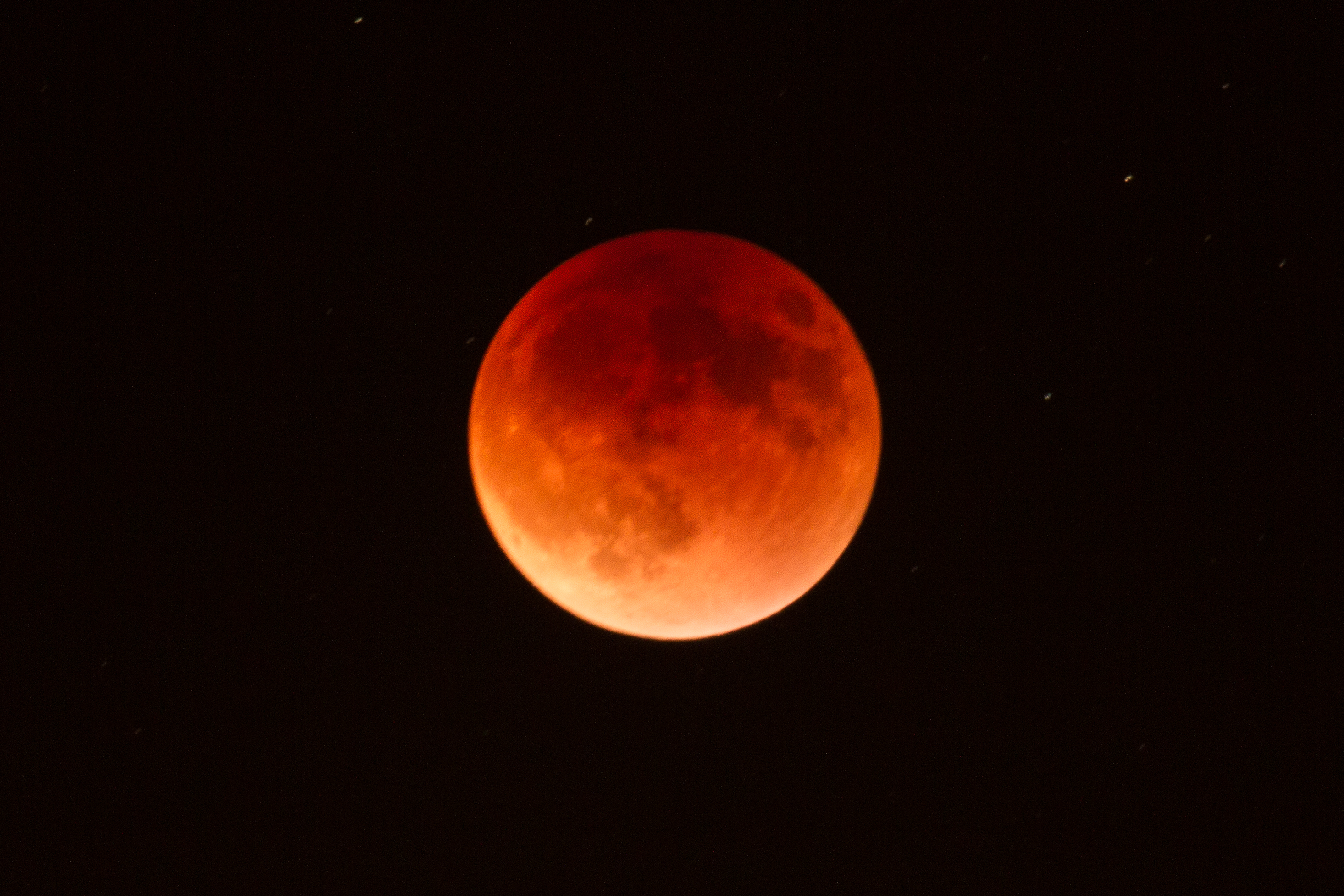
Mill Valley, California, 3:07 UTC

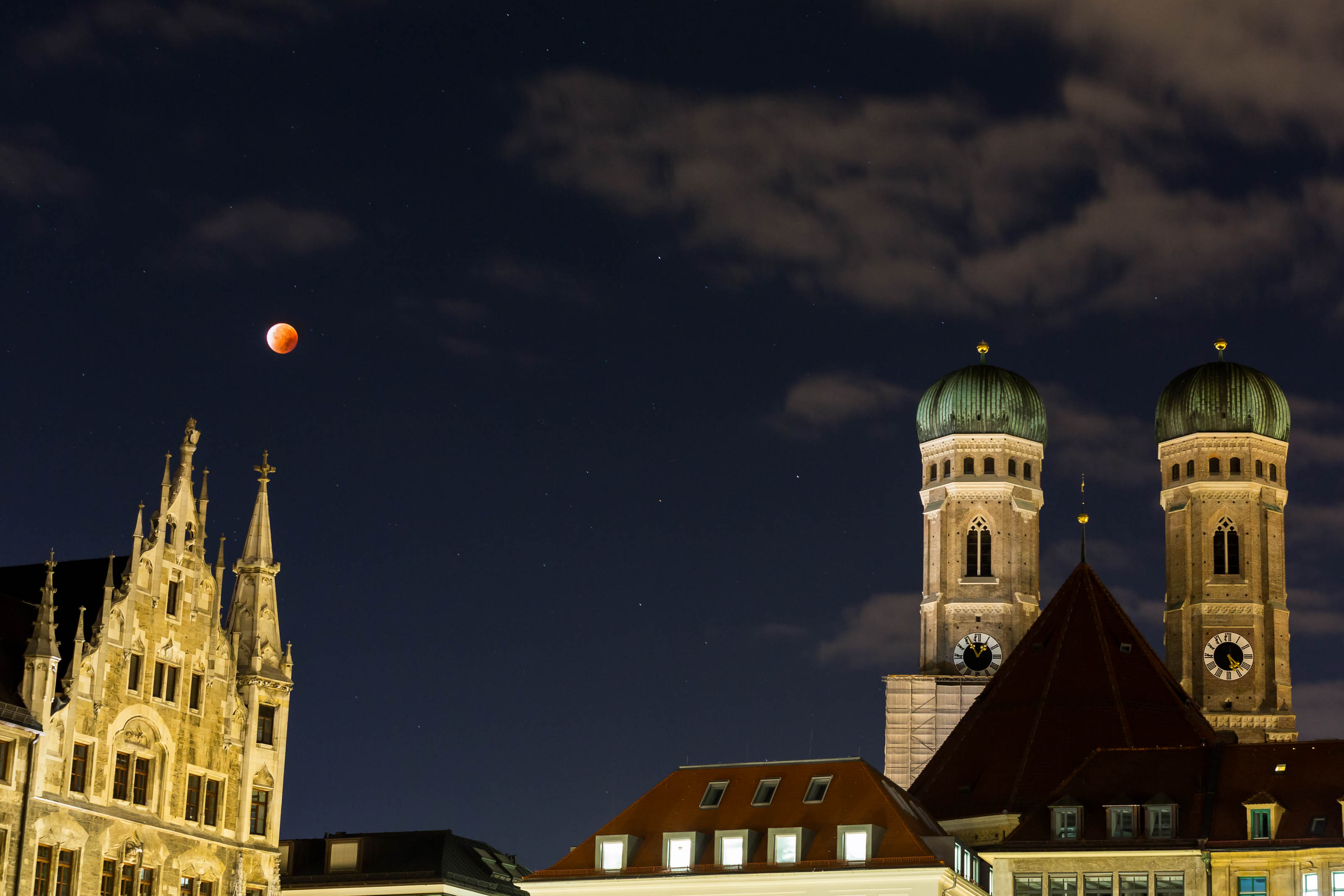
Munich, Germany, 3:23 UTC

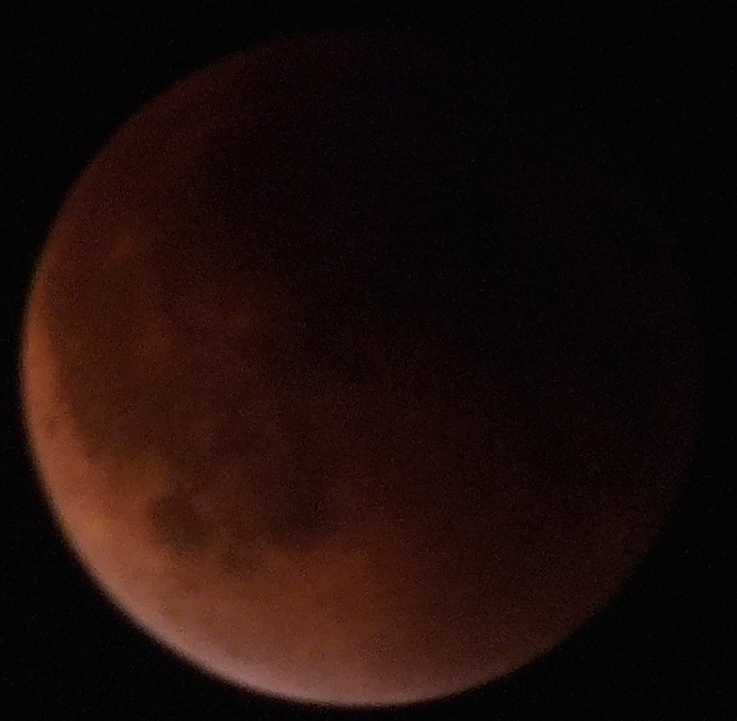
Boston, Massachusetts, 3:24 UTC

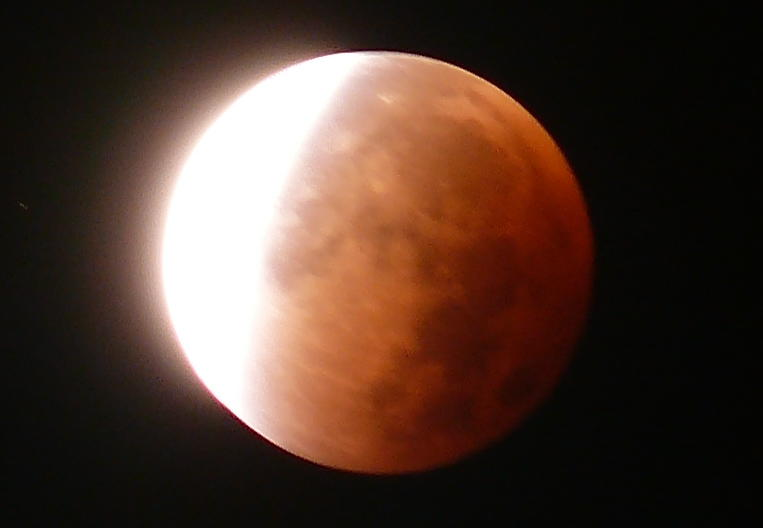
Germany, 3:37 UTC

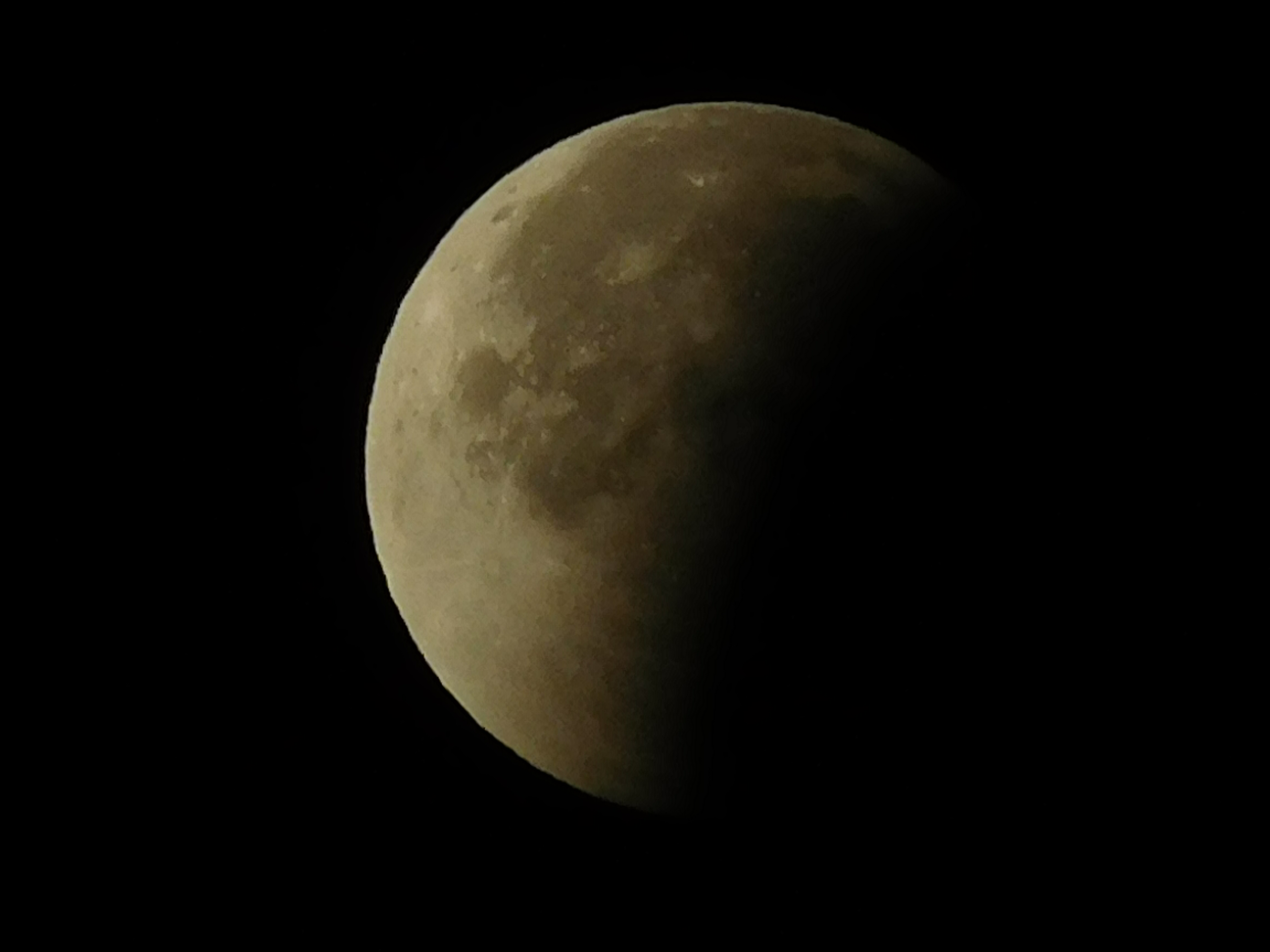
Cosne-Cours-sur-Loire, France, 4:02 UTC

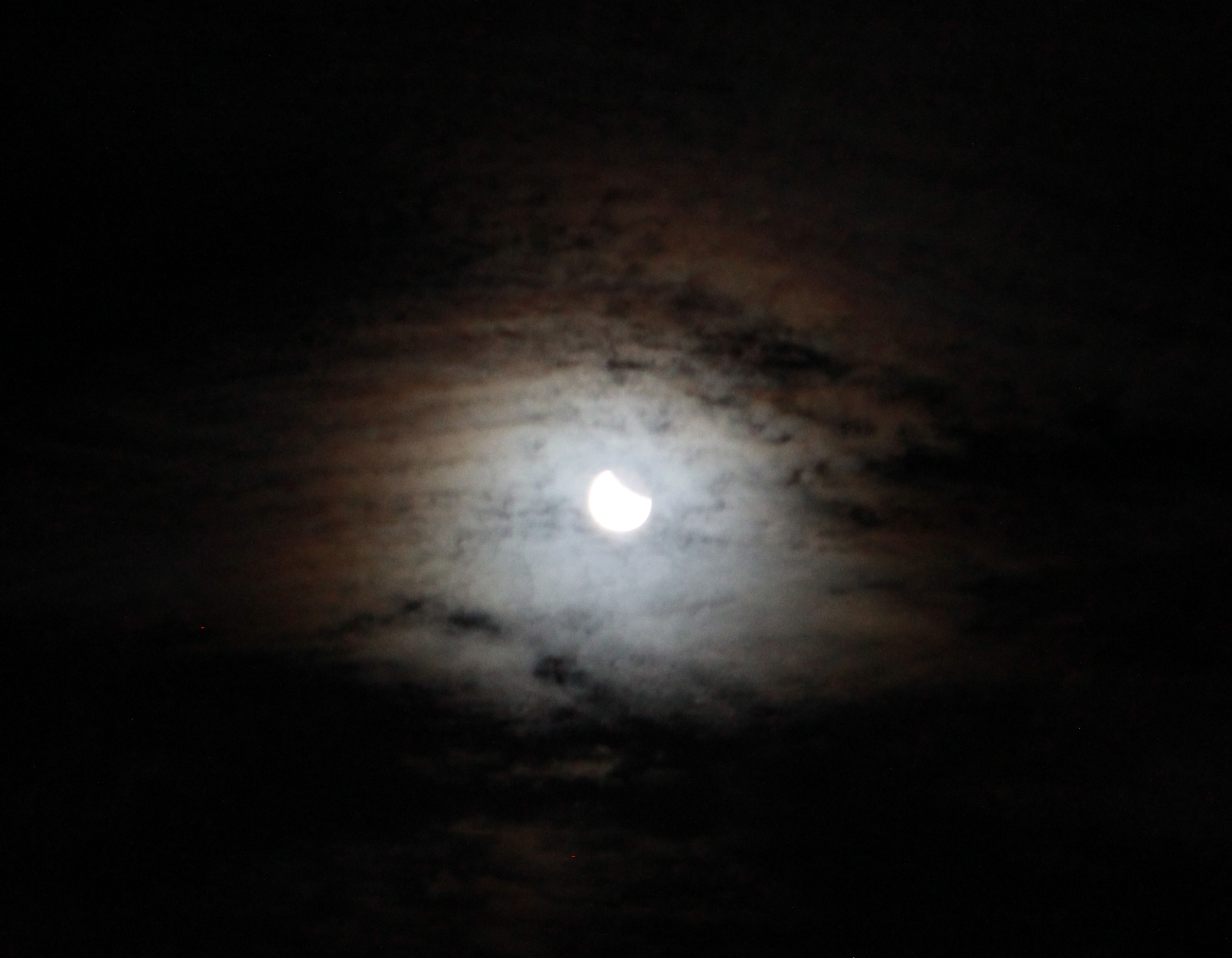
California, 4:07 UTC

== Eclipse details ==
Shown below is a table displaying details about this particular lunar eclipse. It describes various parameters pertaining to this eclipse.

September 28, 2015 Lunar Eclipse Parameters
Parameter	Value
Penumbral Magnitude	2.23071
Umbral Magnitude	1.27744
Gamma	−0.32960
Sun Right Ascension	12h17m08.9s
Sun Declination	-01°51'20.9"
Sun Semi-Diameter	15'57.6"
Sun Equatorial Horizontal Parallax	08.8"
Moon Right Ascension	00h17m33.6s
Moon Declination	+01°32'03.6"
Moon Semi-Diameter	16'44.5"
Moon Equatorial Horizontal Parallax	1°01'26.6"
ΔT	67.8 s

== Eclipse season ==
This eclipse is part of an eclipse season, a period, roughly every six months, when eclipses occur. Only two (or occasionally three) eclipse seasons occur each year, and each season lasts about 35 days and repeats just short of six months (173 days) later; thus two full eclipse seasons always occur each year. Either two or three eclipses happen each eclipse season. In the sequence below, each eclipse is separated by a fortnight.

Eclipse season of September 2015
September 13 Ascending node (new moon)	September 28 Descending node (full moon)
Partial solar eclipse Solar Saros 125	Total lunar eclipse Lunar Saros 137

== Related eclipses ==
=== Eclipses in 2015 ===
- A total solar eclipse on March 20.
- A total lunar eclipse on April 4.
- A partial solar eclipse on September 13.
- A total lunar eclipse on September 28.

=== Metonic ===
- Preceded by: Lunar eclipse of December 10, 2011
- Followed by: Lunar eclipse of July 16, 2019

=== Tzolkinex ===
- Preceded by: Lunar eclipse of August 16, 2008
- Followed by: Lunar eclipse of November 8, 2022

=== Half-Saros ===
- Preceded by: Solar eclipse of September 22, 2006
- Followed by: Solar eclipse of October 2, 2024

=== Tritos ===
- Preceded by: Lunar eclipse of October 28, 2004
- Followed by: Lunar eclipse of August 28, 2026

=== Lunar Saros 137 ===
- Preceded by: Lunar eclipse of September 16, 1997
- Followed by: Lunar eclipse of October 8, 2033

=== Inex ===
- Preceded by: Lunar eclipse of October 17, 1986
- Followed by: Lunar eclipse of September 7, 2044

=== Triad ===
- Preceded by: Lunar eclipse of November 27, 1928
- Followed by: Lunar eclipse of July 30, 2102

=== Lunar eclipses of 2013–2016 ===
This eclipse is a member of a semester series. An eclipse in a semester series of lunar eclipses repeats approximately every 177 days and 4 hours (a semester) at alternating nodes of the Moon's orbit.

The penumbral lunar eclipse on May 25, 2013 occurs in the previous lunar year eclipse set, and the penumbral lunar eclipse on August 18, 2016 occurs in the next lunar year eclipse set.

Lunar eclipse series sets from 2013 to 2016
Ascending node				Descending node			
Saros	Date Viewing	Type Chart	Gamma	Saros	Date Viewing	Type Chart	Gamma
112	2013 Apr 25	Partial	−1.0121	117	2013 Oct 18	Penumbral	1.1508
122	2014 Apr 15	Total	−0.3017	127	2014 Oct 08	Total	0.3827
132	2015 Apr 04	Total	0.4460	137	2015 Sep 28	Total	−0.3296
142	2016 Mar 23	Penumbral	1.1592	147	2016 Sep 16	Penumbral	−1.0549

=== Saros 137 ===
This eclipse is a part of Saros series 137, repeating every 18 years, 11 days, and containing 78 events. The series started with a penumbral lunar eclipse on December 17, 1564. It contains partial eclipses from June 10, 1835 through August 26, 1961; total eclipses from September 6, 1979 through June 28, 2466; and a second set of partial eclipses from July 9, 2484 through September 12, 2592. The series ends at member 78 as a penumbral eclipse on April 20, 2953.

The longest duration of totality will be produced by member 44 at 99 minutes, 53 seconds on April 13, 2340. All eclipses in this series occur at the Moon’s descending node of orbit.

Greatest	First			
The greatest eclipse of the series will occur on 2340 Apr 13, lasting 99 minutes, 53 seconds.	Penumbral	Partial	Total	Central
The greatest eclipse of the series will occur on 2340 Apr 13, lasting 99 minutes, 53 seconds.	1564 Dec 17	1835 Jun 10	1979 Sep 06	2051 Oct 19
The greatest eclipse of the series will occur on 2340 Apr 13, lasting 99 minutes, 53 seconds.	Last			
The greatest eclipse of the series will occur on 2340 Apr 13, lasting 99 minutes, 53 seconds.	Central	Total	Partial	Penumbral
The greatest eclipse of the series will occur on 2340 Apr 13, lasting 99 minutes, 53 seconds.	2412 May 26	2466 Jun 28	2592 Sep 12	2953 Apr 20

Eclipses are tabulated in three columns; every third eclipse in the same column is one exeligmos apart, so they all cast shadows over approximately the same parts of the Earth.

Series members 15–36 occur between 1801 and 2200:
15	16	17
1817 May 30	1835 Jun 10	1853 Jun 21
18	19	20
1871 Jul 02	1889 Jul 12	1907 Jul 25
21	22	23
1925 Aug 04	1943 Aug 15	1961 Aug 26
24	25	26
1979 Sep 06	1997 Sep 16	2015 Sep 28
27	28	29
2033 Oct 08	2051 Oct 19	2069 Oct 30
30	31	32
2087 Nov 10	2105 Nov 21	2123 Dec 03
33	34	35
2141 Dec 13	2159 Dec 24	2178 Jan 04
36
2196 Jan 15

=== Tritos series ===
This eclipse is a part of a tritos cycle, repeating at alternating nodes every 135 synodic months (≈ 3986.63 days, or 11 years minus 1 month). Their appearance and longitude are irregular due to a lack of synchronization with the anomalistic month (period of perigee), but groupings of 3 tritos cycles (≈ 33 years minus 3 months) come close (≈ 434.044 anomalistic months), so eclipses are similar in these groupings.

Series members between 1801 and 2200
1808 May 10 (Saros 118)	1819 Apr 10 (Saros 119)	1830 Mar 09 (Saros 120)	1841 Feb 06 (Saros 121)	1852 Jan 07 (Saros 122)
1862 Dec 06 (Saros 123)	1873 Nov 04 (Saros 124)	1884 Oct 04 (Saros 125)	1895 Sep 04 (Saros 126)	1906 Aug 04 (Saros 127)
1917 Jul 04 (Saros 128)	1928 Jun 03 (Saros 129)	1939 May 03 (Saros 130)	1950 Apr 02 (Saros 131)	1961 Mar 02 (Saros 132)
1972 Jan 30 (Saros 133)	1982 Dec 30 (Saros 134)	1993 Nov 29 (Saros 135)	2004 Oct 28 (Saros 136)	2015 Sep 28 (Saros 137)
2026 Aug 28 (Saros 138)	2037 Jul 27 (Saros 139)	2048 Jun 26 (Saros 140)	2059 May 27 (Saros 141)	2070 Apr 25 (Saros 142)
2081 Mar 25 (Saros 143)	2092 Feb 23 (Saros 144)	2103 Jan 23 (Saros 145)	2113 Dec 22 (Saros 146)	2124 Nov 21 (Saros 147)
2135 Oct 22 (Saros 148)	2146 Sep 20 (Saros 149)	2157 Aug 20 (Saros 150)	2168 Jul 20 (Saros 151)	2179 Jun 19 (Saros 152)
2190 May 19 (Saros 153)

=== Inex series ===
This eclipse is a part of the long period inex cycle, repeating at alternating nodes, every 358 synodic months (≈ 10,571.95 days, or 29 years minus 20 days). Their appearance and longitude are irregular due to a lack of synchronization with the anomalistic month (period of perigee). However, groupings of 3 inex cycles (≈ 87 years minus 2 months) comes close (≈ 1,151.02 anomalistic months), so eclipses are similar in these groupings.

Series members between 1801 and 2200
1813 Feb 15 (Saros 130)	1842 Jan 26 (Saros 131)	1871 Jan 06 (Saros 132)
1899 Dec 17 (Saros 133)	1928 Nov 27 (Saros 134)	1957 Nov 07 (Saros 135)
1986 Oct 17 (Saros 136)	2015 Sep 28 (Saros 137)	2044 Sep 07 (Saros 138)
2073 Aug 17 (Saros 139)	2102 Jul 30 (Saros 140)	2131 Jul 10 (Saros 141)
2160 Jun 18 (Saros 142)	2189 May 29 (Saros 143)	

=== Half-Saros cycle ===
A lunar eclipse will be preceded and followed by solar eclipses by 9 years and 5.5 days (a half saros). This lunar eclipse is related to two annular solar eclipses of solar saros 144.

September 22, 2006	October 2, 2024

== See also ==
- List of lunar eclipses and List of 21st-century lunar eclipses
