= Solar eclipse of August 10, 1934 =

20th-century annular solar eclipse

- Annular eclipse
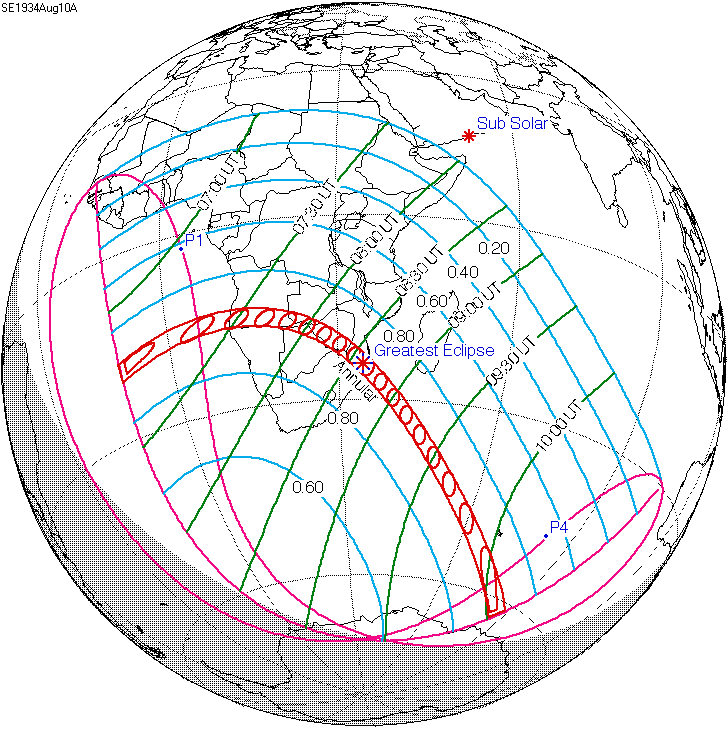
- Map
- Gamma: −0.689
- Magnitude: 0.9436

Maximum eclipse
- Duration: 393 s (6 min 33 s)
- Coordinates: 24.5°S 34.6°E
- Max. width of band: 280 km (170 mi)

Times (UTC)
- Greatest eclipse: 8:37:48

References
- Saros: 144 (12 of 70)
- Catalog # (SE5000): 9361

An annular solar eclipse occurred at the Moon's descending node of orbit on Friday, August 10, 1934, with a magnitude of 0.9436. A solar eclipse occurs when the Moon passes between Earth and the Sun, thereby totally or partly obscuring the image of the Sun for a viewer on Earth. An annular solar eclipse occurs when the Moon's apparent diameter is smaller than the Sun's, blocking most of the Sun's light and causing the Sun to look like an annulus (ring). An annular eclipse appears as a partial eclipse over a region of the Earth thousands of kilometres wide. Occurring only 1.4 days after apogee (on August 8, 1934, at 22:10 UTC), the Moon's apparent diameter was smaller.

Annularity was visible from Portuguese West Africa, South West Africa, Rhodesia, Bechuanaland Protectorate, Mozambique, Transvaal, and Swaziland. A partial eclipse was visible for parts of Southern Africa, Central Africa, East Africa, and Antarctica.

== Eclipse details ==
Shown below are two tables displaying details about this particular solar eclipse. The first table outlines times at which the Moon's penumbra or umbra attains the specific parameter, and the second table describes various other parameters pertaining to this eclipse.

August 10, 1934 Solar Eclipse Times
Event	Time (UTC)
First Penumbral External Contact	1934 August 10 at 05:51:14.0 UTC
First Umbral External Contact	1934 August 10 at 07:08:49.0 UTC
First Central Line	1934 August 10 at 07:12:00.6 UTC
First Umbral Internal Contact	1934 August 10 at 07:15:15.6 UTC
Greatest Duration	1934 August 10 at 08:26:09.6 UTC
Greatest Eclipse	1934 August 10 at 08:37:47.5 UTC
Ecliptic Conjunction	1934 August 10 at 08:45:56.7 UTC
Equatorial Conjunction	1934 August 10 at 09:12:57.7 UTC
Last Umbral Internal Contact	1934 August 10 at 09:59:57.4 UTC
Last Central Line	1934 August 10 at 10:03:12.2 UTC
Last Umbral External Contact	1934 August 10 at 10:06:23.4 UTC
Last Penumbral External Contact	1934 August 10 at 11:24:05.2 UTC

August 10, 1934 Solar Eclipse Parameters
Parameter	Value
Eclipse Magnitude	0.94361
Eclipse Obscuration	0.89039
Gamma	−0.68896
Sun Right Ascension	09h17m53.7s
Sun Declination	+15°44'27.3"
Sun Semi-Diameter	15'46.8"
Sun Equatorial Horizontal Parallax	08.7"
Moon Right Ascension	09h16m52.8s
Moon Declination	+15°10'20.0"
Moon Semi-Diameter	14'43.8"
Moon Equatorial Horizontal Parallax	0°54'03.6"
ΔT	23.9 s

== Eclipse season ==
This eclipse is part of an eclipse season, a period, roughly every six months, when eclipses occur. Only two (or occasionally three) eclipse seasons occur each year, and each season lasts about 35 days and repeats just short of six months (173 days) later; thus two full eclipse seasons always occur each year. Either two or three eclipses happen each eclipse season. In the sequence below, each eclipse is separated by a fortnight.

Eclipse season of July–August 1934
July 26 Ascending node (full moon)	August 10 Descending node (new moon)
Partial lunar eclipse Lunar Saros 118	Annular solar eclipse Solar Saros 144

== Related eclipses ==
=== Eclipses in 1934 ===
- A partial lunar eclipse on January 30.
- A total solar eclipse on February 14.
- A partial lunar eclipse on July 26.
- An annular solar eclipse on August 10.

=== Metonic ===
- Preceded by: Solar eclipse of October 21, 1930
- Followed by: Solar eclipse of May 29, 1938

=== Tzolkinex ===
- Preceded by: Solar eclipse of June 29, 1927
- Followed by: Solar eclipse of September 21, 1941

=== Half-Saros ===
- Preceded by: Lunar eclipse of August 4, 1925
- Followed by: Lunar eclipse of August 15, 1943

=== Tritos ===
- Preceded by: Solar eclipse of September 10, 1923
- Followed by: Solar eclipse of July 9, 1945

=== Solar Saros 144 ===
- Preceded by: Solar eclipse of July 30, 1916
- Followed by: Solar eclipse of August 20, 1952

=== Inex ===
- Preceded by: Solar eclipse of August 30, 1905
- Followed by: Solar eclipse of July 20, 1963

=== Triad ===
- Preceded by: Solar eclipse of October 9, 1847
- Followed by: Solar eclipse of June 10, 2021

=== Solar eclipses of 1931–1935 ===
This eclipse is a member of a semester series. An eclipse in a semester series of solar eclipses repeats approximately every 177 days and 4 hours (a semester) at alternating nodes of the Moon's orbit.

The partial solar eclipses on April 18, 1931 and October 11, 1931 occur in the previous lunar year eclipse set, and the solar eclipses on January 5, 1935 (partial), June 30, 1935 (partial), and December 25, 1935 (annular) occur in the next lunar year eclipse set.

Solar eclipse series sets from 1931 to 1935
Descending node			Ascending node		
Saros	Map	Gamma	Saros	Map	Gamma
114	September 12, 1931 Partial	1.506	119	March 7, 1932 Annular	−0.9673
124	August 31, 1932 Total	0.8307	129	February 24, 1933 Annular	−0.2191
134	August 21, 1933 Annular	0.0869	139	February 14, 1934 Total	0.4868
144	August 10, 1934 Annular	−0.689	149	February 3, 1935 Partial	1.1438
154	July 30, 1935 Partial	−1.4259			

=== Saros 144 ===
This eclipse is a part of Saros series 144, repeating every 18 years, 11 days, and containing 70 events. The series started with a partial solar eclipse on April 11, 1736. It contains annular eclipses from July 7, 1880 through August 27, 2565. There are no hybrid or total eclipses in this set. The series ends at member 70 as a partial eclipse on May 5, 2980. Its eclipses are tabulated in three columns; every third eclipse in the same column is one exeligmos apart, so they all cast shadows over approximately the same parts of the Earth.

The longest duration of annularity will be produced by member 51 at 9 minutes, 52 seconds on December 29, 2168. All eclipses in this series occur at the Moon’s descending node of orbit.

Series members 5–26 occur between 1801 and 2200:
5	6	7
May 25, 1808	June 5, 1826	June 16, 1844
8	9	10
June 27, 1862	July 7, 1880	July 18, 1898
11	12	13
July 30, 1916	August 10, 1934	August 20, 1952
14	15	16
August 31, 1970	September 11, 1988	September 22, 2006
17	18	19
October 2, 2024	October 14, 2042	October 24, 2060
20	21	22
November 4, 2078	November 15, 2096	November 27, 2114
23	24	25
December 7, 2132	December 19, 2150	December 29, 2168
26
January 9, 2187

=== Metonic series ===
The metonic series repeats eclipses every 19 years (6939.69 days), lasting about 5 cycles. Eclipses occur in nearly the same calendar date. In addition, the octon subseries repeats 1/5 of that or every 3.8 years (1387.94 days). All eclipses in this table occur at the Moon's descending node.

22 eclipse events between March 16, 1866 and August 9, 1953
March 16–17	January 1–3	October 20–22	August 9–10	May 27–29
108	110	112	114	116
March 16, 1866			August 9, 1877	May 27, 1881
118	120	122	124	126
March 16, 1885	January 1, 1889	October 20, 1892	August 9, 1896	May 28, 1900
128	130	132	134	136
March 17, 1904	January 3, 1908	October 22, 1911	August 10, 1915	May 29, 1919
138	140	142	144	146
March 17, 1923	January 3, 1927	October 21, 1930	August 10, 1934	May 29, 1938
148	150	152	154	
March 16, 1942	January 3, 1946	October 21, 1949	August 9, 1953	

=== Tritos series ===
This eclipse is a part of a tritos cycle, repeating at alternating nodes every 135 synodic months (≈ 3986.63 days, or 11 years minus 1 month). Their appearance and longitude are irregular due to a lack of synchronization with the anomalistic month (period of perigee), but groupings of 3 tritos cycles (≈ 33 years minus 3 months) come close (≈ 434.044 anomalistic months), so eclipses are similar in these groupings.

Series members between 1801 and 2087
August 17, 1803 (Saros 132)	July 17, 1814 (Saros 133)	June 16, 1825 (Saros 134)	May 15, 1836 (Saros 135)	April 15, 1847 (Saros 136)
March 15, 1858 (Saros 137)	February 11, 1869 (Saros 138)	January 11, 1880 (Saros 139)	December 12, 1890 (Saros 140)	November 11, 1901 (Saros 141)
October 10, 1912 (Saros 142)	September 10, 1923 (Saros 143)	August 10, 1934 (Saros 144)	July 9, 1945 (Saros 145)	June 8, 1956 (Saros 146)
May 9, 1967 (Saros 147)	April 7, 1978 (Saros 148)	March 7, 1989 (Saros 149)	February 5, 2000 (Saros 150)	January 4, 2011 (Saros 151)
December 4, 2021 (Saros 152)	November 3, 2032 (Saros 153)	October 3, 2043 (Saros 154)	September 2, 2054 (Saros 155)	August 2, 2065 (Saros 156)
July 1, 2076 (Saros 157)	June 1, 2087 (Saros 158)			

=== Inex series ===
This eclipse is a part of the long period inex cycle, repeating at alternating nodes, every 358 synodic months (≈ 10,571.95 days, or 29 years minus 20 days). Their appearance and longitude are irregular due to a lack of synchronization with the anomalistic month (period of perigee). However, groupings of 3 inex cycles (≈ 87 years minus 2 months) comes close (≈ 1,151.02 anomalistic months), so eclipses are similar in these groupings.

Series members between 1801 and 2200
October 29, 1818 (Saros 140)	October 9, 1847 (Saros 141)	September 17, 1876 (Saros 142)
August 30, 1905 (Saros 143)	August 10, 1934 (Saros 144)	July 20, 1963 (Saros 145)
June 30, 1992 (Saros 146)	June 10, 2021 (Saros 147)	May 20, 2050 (Saros 148)
May 1, 2079 (Saros 149)	April 11, 2108 (Saros 150)	March 21, 2137 (Saros 151)
March 2, 2166 (Saros 152)	February 10, 2195 (Saros 153)	
