= Tres Cerros =

- Municipality and village
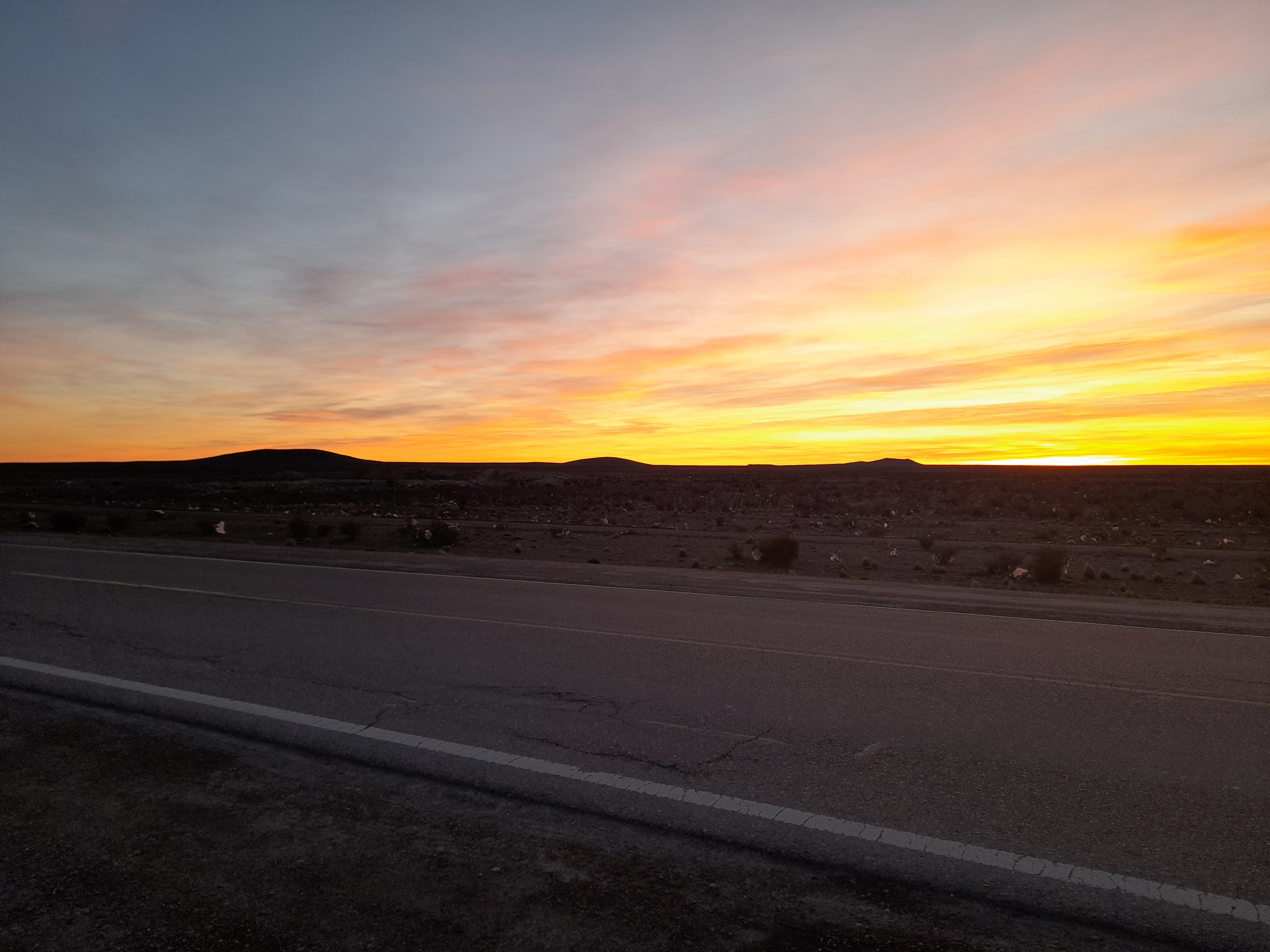
- Tres Cerros - Santa Cruz - Argentina

- Location within Argentina
- Coordinates: 48°7′27″S 67°38′38″W
- Country: Argentina
- Province: Santa Cruz Province
- Department: Deseado
- Time zone: UTC−3 (ART)
- Climate: BSk

Tres Cerros is a village and municipality in Santa Cruz Province in southern Argentina with a population of 28.
