= Solar Saros 144 =

Series of solar eclipses

Historic saros cycle animation

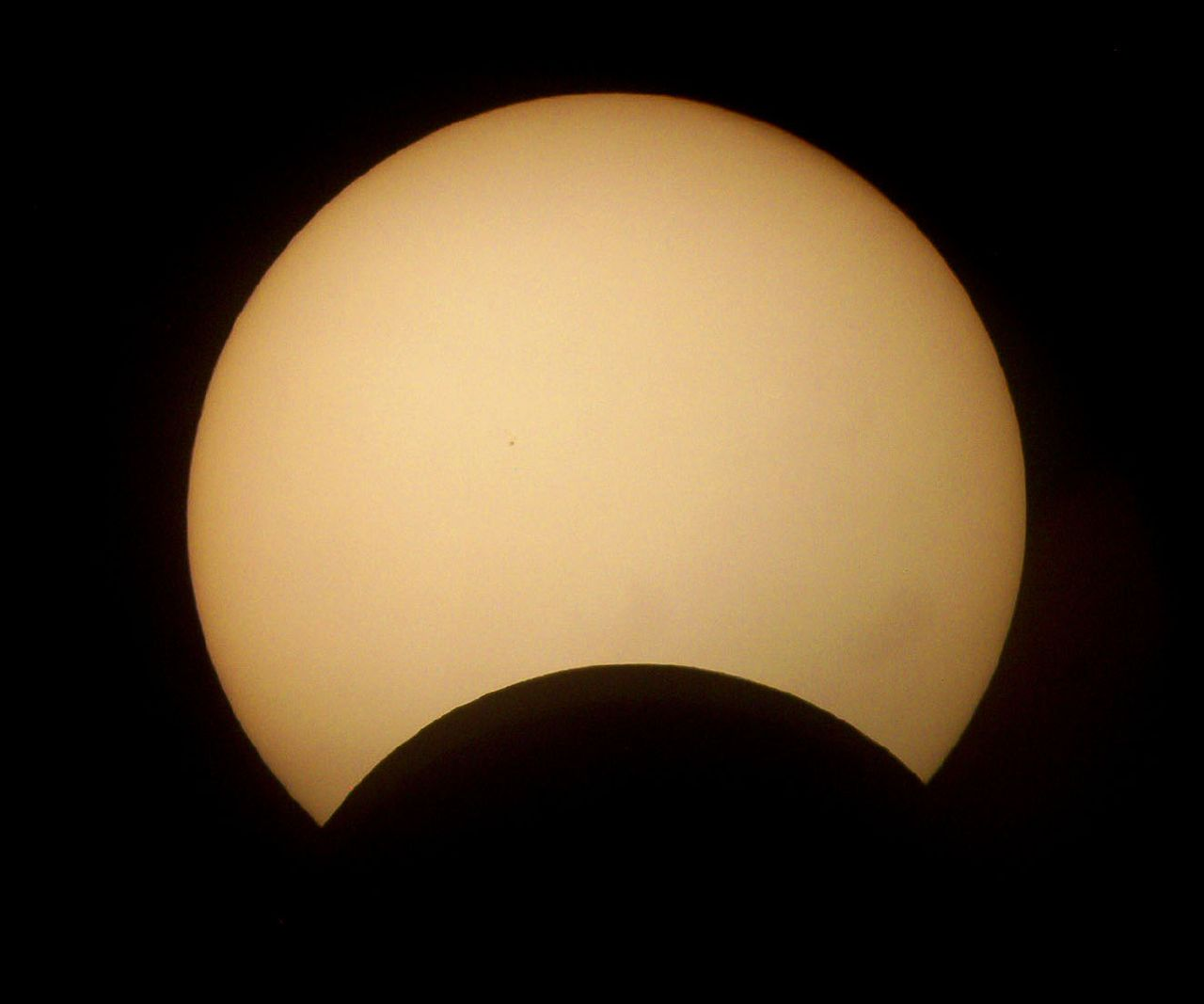
Partial solar eclipse of September 22, 2006 (of annular event) from São Paulo, Brazil, member 16, of Saros series 144

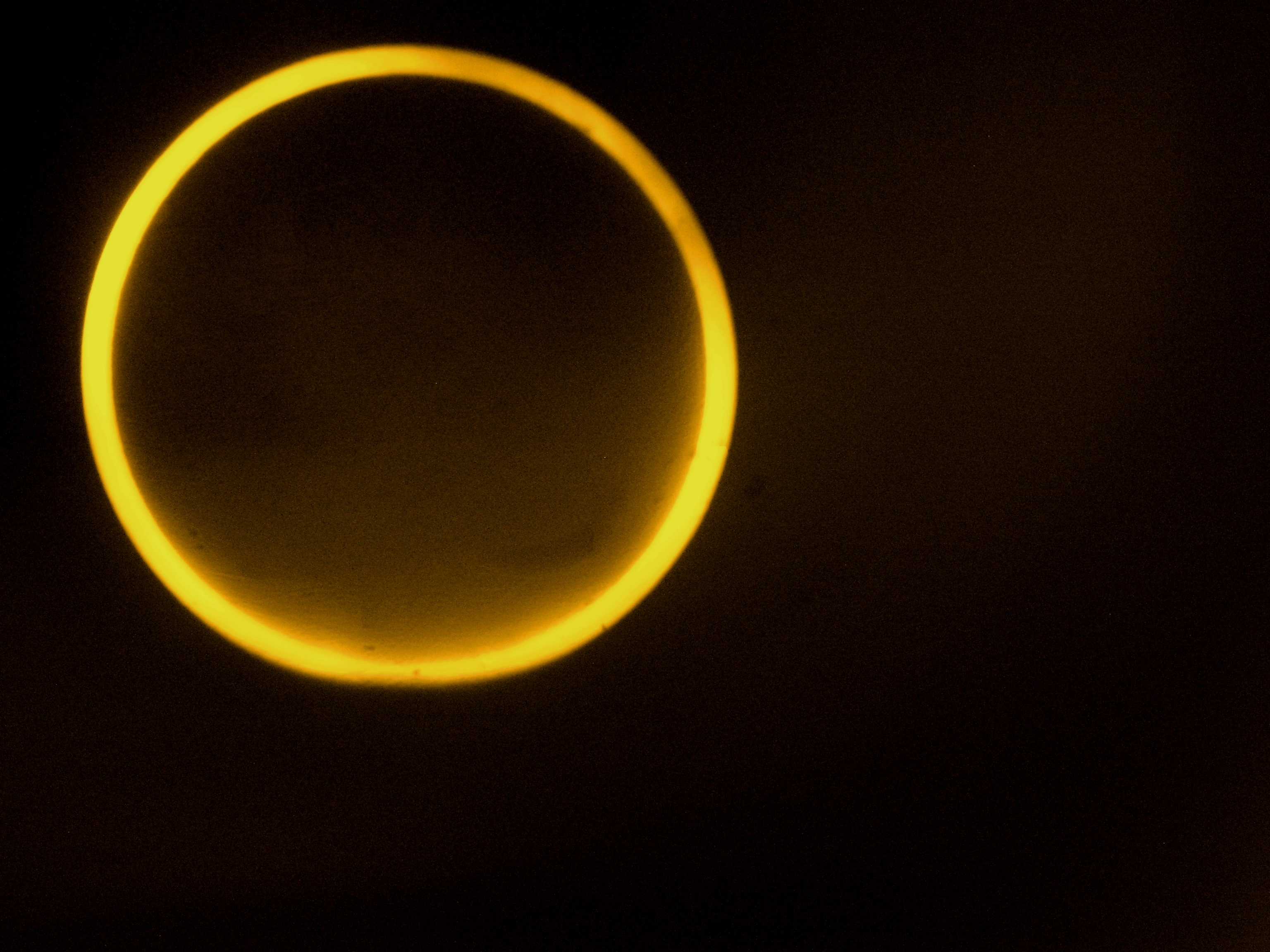
Annular solar eclipse of October 2, 2024 from Santa Cruz Province, Argentina, member 17, of Saros series 144

Saros cycle series 144 for solar eclipses occurs at the Moon's descending node, repeating every 18 years, 11 days, containing 70 eclipses, 39 of which are umbral (all annular). The first eclipse in the series was on 11 April 1736 and the last will be on 5 May 2980, with annular eclipses falling between 7 July 1880 and 27 August 2565. The most recent eclipse was an annular eclipse on 2 October 2024 and the next will be on 14 October 2042. The longest duration of annularity will be 9 minutes, 52 seconds on 29 December 2168.

Series members 11-21 occurring between 1901 and 2100:
11	12	13
Jul 30, 1916	Aug 10, 1934	Aug 20, 1952
14	15	16
Aug 31, 1970	Sep 11, 1988	Sep 22, 2006
17	18	19
Oct 2, 2024	Oct 14, 2042	Oct 24, 2060
20	21	
Nov 4, 2078	Nov 15, 2096	

== Umbral eclipses ==
Umbral eclipses (annular, total and hybrid) can be further classified as either: 1) Central (two limits), 2) Central (one limit) or 3) Non-Central (one limit). The statistical distribution of these classes in Saros series 144 appears in the following table.

Classification	Number	Percent
All Umbral eclipses	39	100.00%
Central (two limits)	39	100.00%
Central (one limit)	0	0.00%
Non-central (one limit)	0	0.00%

== All eclipses ==
Saros	Member	Date	Time (Greatest) UTC	Type	Location Lat, Long	Gamma	Mag.	Width (km)	Duration (min:sec)	Ref
144	1	April 11, 1736	7:18:07	Partial	71.5S 134.3E	-1.5166	0.0748			
144	2	April 22, 1754	14:25:57	Partial	71S 14E	-1.4631	0.1669			
144	3	May 2, 1772	21:26:41	Partial	70.2S 104.1W	-1.4043	0.2683			
144	4	May 14, 1790	4:17:21	Partial	69.4S 140.9E	-1.3374	0.384			
144	5	May 25, 1808	11:02:35	Partial	68.4S 27.8E	-1.2665	0.5064			
144	6	June 5, 1826	17:39:05	Partial	67.4S 82.5W	-1.1887	0.6407			
144	7	June 16, 1844	0:13:22	Partial	66.4S 168.3E	-1.1092	0.7778			
144	8	June 27, 1862	6:42:21	Partial	65.4S 60.8E	-1.0252	0.9222			
144	9	July 7, 1880	13:10:28	Annular	46.4S 33.4W	-0.9406	0.9441	611	5m 47s	
144	10	July 18, 1898	19:36:54	Annular	35.7S 130.1W	-0.8546	0.945	385	6m 11s	
144	11	July 30, 1916	2:06:10	Annular	29S 132.4E	-0.7709	0.9447	313	6m 24s	
144	12	August 10, 1934	8:37:48	Annular	24.5S 34.6E	-0.689	0.9436	280	6m 33s	
144	13	August 20, 1952	15:13:35	Annular	21.7S 64.1W	-0.6102	0.942	264	6m 40s	
144	14	August 31, 1970	21:55:30	Annular	20.3S 164W	-0.5364	0.94	258	6m 47s	
144	15	September 11, 1988	4:44:29	Annular	20S 94.4E	-0.4681	0.9377	258	6m 57s	
144	16	September 22, 2006	11:41:16	Annular	20.6S 9.1W	-0.4062	0.9352	261	7m 9s	
144	17	October 2, 2024	18:46:13	Annular	22S 114.5W	-0.3509	0.9326	266	7m 25s	
144	18	October 14, 2042	2:00:42	Annular	23.7S 137.8E	-0.303	0.93	273	7m 44s	
144	19	October 24, 2060	9:24:10	Annular	25.8S 28.1E	-0.2625	0.9277	281	8m 6s	
144	20	November 4, 2078	16:55:44	Annular	27.8S 83.3W	-0.2285	0.9255	287	8m 29s	
144	21	November 15, 2096	0:36:15	Annular	29.7S 163.3E	-0.2018	0.9237	294	8m 53s	
144	22	November 27, 2114	8:24:15	Annular	31.3S 48.4E	-0.1815	0.9223	298	9m 15s	
144	23	December 7, 2132	16:18:43	Annular	32.2S 67.9W	-0.1661	0.9215	301	9m 33s	
144	24	December 19, 2150	0:17:02	Annular	32.3S 175E	-0.1535	0.9211	302	9m 46s	
144	25	December 29, 2168	8:19:33	Annular	31.6S 56.7E	-0.1444	0.9215	300	9m 52s	
144	26	January 9, 2187	16:23:41	Annular	30S 62.1W	-0.1365	0.9224	296	9m 51s	
144	27	January 21, 2205	0:27:32	Annular	27.5S 178.6E	-0.1281	0.9241	289	9m 42s	
144	28	February 1, 2223	8:29:43	Annular	24.1S 59.2E	-0.118	0.9263	279	9m 26s	
144	29	February 11, 2241	16:28:39	Annular	19.9S 60W	-0.1046	0.9292	267	9m 4s	
144	30	February 23, 2259	0:23:41	Annular	15S 178.8W	-0.0875	0.9326	253	8m 36s	
144	31	March 5, 2277	8:11:55	Annular	9.5S 63.6E	-0.0645	0.9366	236	8m 4s	
144	32	March 16, 2295	15:54:34	Annular	3.6S 53W	-0.0362	0.9409	219	7m 29s	
144	33	March 27, 2313	23:29:31	Annular	2.6N 167.9W	-0.0011	0.9456	200	6m 50s	
144	34	April 8, 2331	6:57:09	Annular	9.2N 79E	0.0408	0.9506	181	6m 7s	
144	35	April 18, 2349	14:16:52	Annular	16N 32.1W	0.0899	0.9557	162	5m 23s	
144	36	April 29, 2367	21:30:03	Annular	22.8N 141.2W	0.1451	0.9607	144	4m 38s	
144	37	May 10, 2385	4:36:49	Annular	29.5N 111.9E	0.2063	0.9657	126	3m 53s	
144	38	May 21, 2403	11:36:55	Annular	36.1N 7.4E	0.2737	0.9705	110	3m 10s	
144	39	May 31, 2421	18:32:59	Annular	42.4N 95W	0.3451	0.975	95	2m 32s	
144	40	June 12, 2439	1:25:22	Annular	48.2N 165.1E	0.4206	0.9791	82	1m 59s	
144	41	June 22, 2457	8:16:13	Annular	53.2N 67.4E	0.4979	0.9827	71	1m 32s	
144	42	July 3, 2475	15:05:22	Annular	57.3N 27.7W	0.5775	0.9858	62	1m 11s	
144	43	July 13, 2493	21:56:36	Annular	60.3N 121.4W	0.6562	0.9882	55	0m 56s	
144	44	July 26, 2511	4:49:26	Annular	62.1N 146.2E	0.7346	0.9899	52	0m 45s	
144	45	August 5, 2529	11:45:36	Annular	62.9N 53.9E	0.8109	0.991	54	0m 39s	
144	46	August 16, 2547	18:46:36	Annular	63N 38.6W	0.8841	0.991	67	0m 37s	
144	47	August 27, 2565	1:53:56	Annular	63N 129.3W	0.9527	0.99	117	0m 39s	
144	48	September 7, 2583	9:09:01	Partial	61.3N 150.8E	1.016	0.9596			
144	49	September 18, 2601	16:30:38	Partial	61.1N 32.1E	1.0746	0.8541			
144	50	September 30, 2619	0:02:28	Partial	61.2N 89.2W	1.1256	0.762			
144	51	October 10, 2637	7:42:11	Partial	61.4N 147.6E	1.1709	0.6802			
144	52	October 21, 2655	15:32:13	Partial	61.7N 21.7E	1.2084	0.6123			
144	53	October 31, 2673	23:29:55	Partial	62.2N 106.2W	1.2404	0.5544			
144	54	November 12, 2691	7:38:14	Partial	62.8N 123.2E	1.2646	0.5105			
144	55	November 23, 2709	15:53:41	Partial	63.6N 9.5W	1.2837	0.4759			
144	56	December 5, 2727	0:17:21	Partial	64.4N 144.5W	1.2968	0.4521			
144	57	December 15, 2745	8:47:08	Partial	65.4N 78.7E	1.3057	0.4358			
144	58	December 26, 2763	17:23:22	Partial	66.4N 60.1W	1.3098	0.4283			
144	59	January 6, 2782	2:02:17	Partial	67.5N 159.9E	1.3126	0.4228			
144	60	January 17, 2800	10:43:57	Partial	68.6N 18.7E	1.3141	0.42			
144	61	January 27, 2818	19:25:58	Partial	69.6N 123.1W	1.3157	0.4167			
144	62	February 8, 2836	4:08:21	Partial	70.5N 94.2E	1.3175	0.413			
144	63	February 18, 2854	12:46:44	Partial	71.2N 48W	1.3232	0.4021			
144	64	February 29, 2872	21:22:44	Partial	71.7N 169.8E	1.3315	0.3864			
144	65	March 12, 2890	5:52:26	Partial	72N 28.9E	1.3454	0.36			
144	66	March 23, 2908	14:18:02	Partial	72.1N 111.2W	1.3632	0.3262			
144	67	April 3, 2926	22:34:55	Partial	71.9N 111E	1.3882	0.2785			
144	68	April 14, 2944	6:47:04	Partial	71.4N 25.3W	1.4176	0.2219			
144	69	April 25, 2962	14:50:32	Partial	70.8N 158.9W	1.4546	0.1507			
144	70	May 5, 2980	22:48:34	Partial	70N 69.5E	1.4963	0.0697			
