= August 2027 lunar eclipse =

Penumbral

- Penumbral eclipse
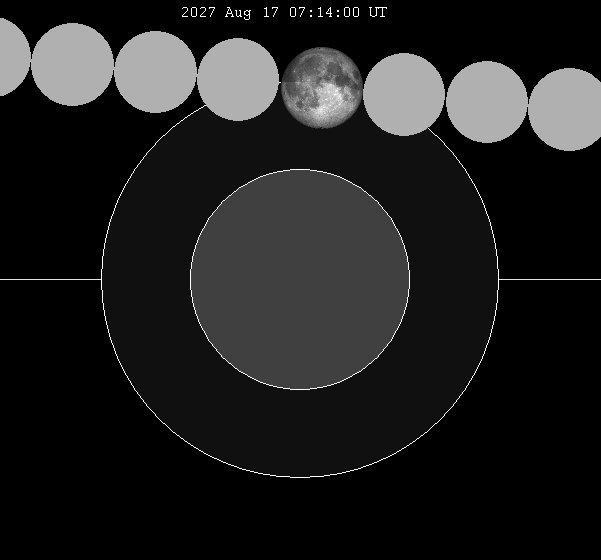
- The Moon's hourly motion shown right to left
- Date: August 17, 2027
- Gamma: 1.2797
- Magnitude: −0.5234
- Saros cycle: 148 (4 of 71)
- Penumbral: 218 minutes, 35 seconds
Contacts (UTC)
- P1: 5:24:29
- Greatest: 7:13:43
- P4: 9:03:03

A penumbral lunar eclipse will occur at the Moon’s ascending node of orbit on Tuesday, August 17, 2027, with an umbral magnitude of −0.5234. A lunar eclipse occurs when the Moon moves into the Earth's shadow, causing the Moon to be darkened. A penumbral lunar eclipse occurs when part or all of the Moon's near side passes into the Earth's penumbra. Unlike a solar eclipse, which can only be viewed from a relatively small area of the world, a lunar eclipse may be viewed from anywhere on the night side of Earth. Occurring about 1.9 days after apogee (on August 15, 2027, at 10:20 UTC), the Moon's apparent diameter will be smaller.

== Visibility ==
The eclipse will be completely visible over North and South America, seen rising over Australia and the central Pacific Ocean and setting over west Africa.

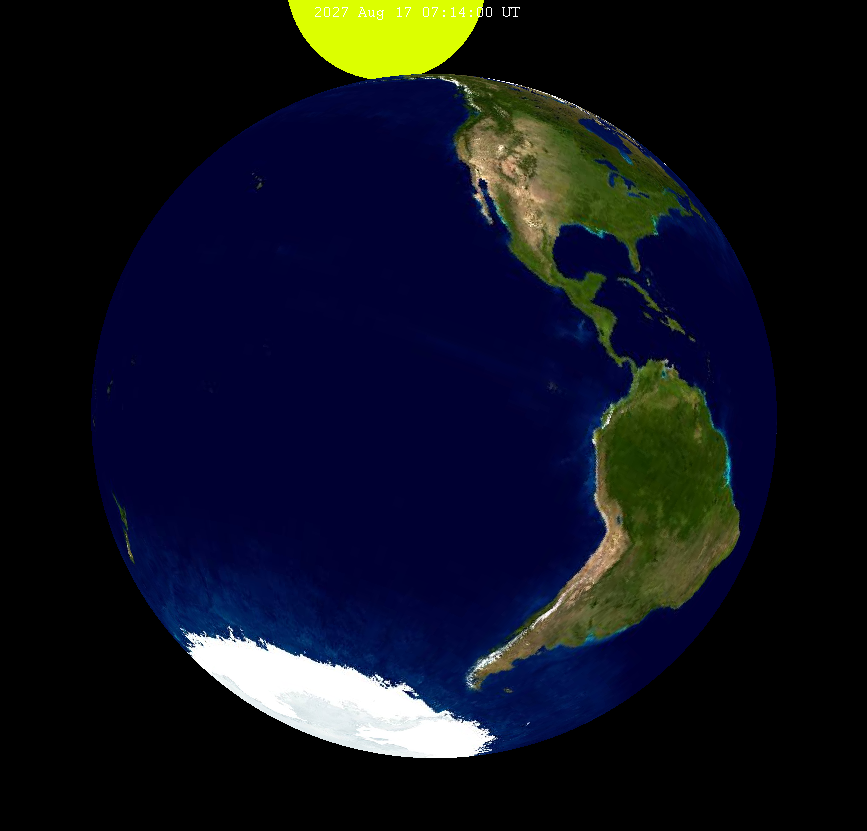
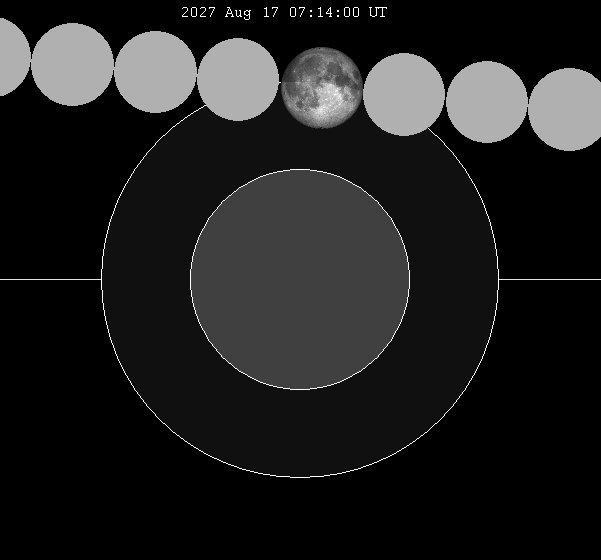

== Eclipse details ==
Shown below is a table displaying details about this particular eclipse. It describes various parameters pertaining to this eclipse.

August 17, 2027 Lunar Eclipse Parameters
Parameter	Value
Penumbral Magnitude	0.54758
Umbral Magnitude	−0.52344
Gamma	1.27974
Sun Right Ascension	09h45m58.6s
Sun Declination	+13°27'30.2"
Sun Semi-Diameter	15'47.8"
Sun Equatorial Horizontal Parallax	08.7"
Moon Right Ascension	21h43m58.8s
Moon Declination	-12°24'40.9"
Moon Semi-Diameter	14'44.9"
Moon Equatorial Horizontal Parallax	0°54'07.8"
ΔT	72.8 s

== Eclipse season ==
This eclipse is part of an eclipse season, a period, roughly every six months, when eclipses occur. Only two (or occasionally three) eclipse seasons occur each year, and each season lasts about 35 days and repeats just short of six months (173 days) later; thus two full eclipse seasons always occur each year. Either two or three eclipses happen each eclipse season. In the sequence below, each eclipse is separated by a fortnight. The first and last eclipse in this sequence is separated by one synodic month.

Eclipse season of July–August 2027
July 18 Ascending node (full moon)	August 2 Descending node (new moon)	August 17 Ascending node (full moon)
Penumbral lunar eclipse Lunar Saros 110	Total solar eclipse Solar Saros 136	Penumbral lunar eclipse Lunar Saros 148

== Related eclipses ==
=== Eclipses in 2027 ===
- An annular solar eclipse on February 6.
- A penumbral lunar eclipse on February 20.
- A penumbral lunar eclipse on July 18.
- A total solar eclipse on August 2.
- A penumbral lunar eclipse on August 17.

=== Metonic ===
- Preceded by: Lunar eclipse of October 28, 2023
- Followed by: Lunar eclipse of June 5, 2031

=== Tzolkinex ===
- Preceded by: Lunar eclipse of July 5, 2020
- Followed by: Lunar eclipse of September 28, 2034

=== Half-Saros ===
- Preceded by: Solar eclipse of August 11, 2018
- Followed by: Solar eclipse of August 21, 2036

=== Tritos ===
- Preceded by: Lunar eclipse of September 16, 2016
- Followed by: Lunar eclipse of July 16, 2038

=== Lunar Saros 148 ===
- Preceded by: Lunar eclipse of August 6, 2009
- Followed by: Lunar eclipse of August 27, 2045

=== Inex ===
- Preceded by: Lunar eclipse of September 6, 1998
- Followed by: Lunar eclipse of July 26, 2056

=== Triad ===
- Preceded by: Lunar eclipse of October 16, 1940
- Followed by: Lunar eclipse of June 18, 2114

=== Lunar eclipses of 2024–2027 ===
This eclipse is a member of a semester series. An eclipse in a semester series of lunar eclipses repeats approximately every 177 days and 4 hours (a semester) at alternating nodes of the Moon's orbit.

The penumbral lunar eclipse on July 18, 2027 occurs in the next lunar year eclipse set.

Lunar eclipse series sets from 2024 to 2027
Descending node				Ascending node			
Saros	Date Viewing	Type Chart	Gamma	Saros	Date Viewing	Type Chart	Gamma
113	2024 Mar 25	Penumbral	1.0610	118	2024 Sep 18	Partial	−0.9792
123	2025 Mar 14	Total	0.3485	128	2025 Sep 07	Total	−0.2752
133	2026 Mar 03	Total	−0.3765	138	2026 Aug 28	Partial	0.4964
143	2027 Feb 20	Penumbral	−1.0480	148	2027 Aug 17	Penumbral	1.2797

=== Metonic series ===
The Metonic cycle repeats nearly exactly every 19 years and represents a Saros cycle plus one lunar year. Because it occurs on the same calendar date, the Earth's shadow will in nearly the same location relative to the background stars.

Metonic lunar eclipse sets 1951–2027
Descending node			Ascending node		
Saros	Date	Type	Saros	Date	Type
103	1951 Feb 21.88	Penumbral	108	1951 Aug 17.13	Penumbral
113	1970 Feb 21.35	Partial	118	1970 Aug 17.14	Partial
123	1989 Feb 20.64	Total	128	1989 Aug 17.13	Total
133	2008 Feb 21.14	Total	138	2008 Aug 16.88	Partial
143	2027 Feb 20.96	Penumbral	148	2027 Aug 17.30	Penumbral

=== Saros 148 ===
This eclipse is a part of Saros series 148, repeating every 18 years, 11 days, and containing 70 events. The series started with a penumbral lunar eclipse on July 15, 1973. It contains partial eclipses from October 10, 2117 through May 5, 2460; total eclipses from May 17, 2478 through September 14, 2676; and a second set of partial eclipses from September 25, 2694 through May 25, 3091. The series ends at member 70 as a penumbral eclipse on August 9, 3217.

The longest duration of totality will be produced by member 37 at 104 minutes, 29 seconds on July 10, 2568. All eclipses in this series occur at the Moon’s ascending node of orbit.

Greatest	First			
The greatest eclipse of the series will occur on 2568 Jul 10, lasting 104 minutes, 29 seconds.	Penumbral	Partial	Total	Central
The greatest eclipse of the series will occur on 2568 Jul 10, lasting 104 minutes, 29 seconds.	1973 Jul 15	2117 Oct 10	2478 May 25	2514 Jun 08
The greatest eclipse of the series will occur on 2568 Jul 10, lasting 104 minutes, 29 seconds.	Last			
The greatest eclipse of the series will occur on 2568 Jul 10, lasting 104 minutes, 29 seconds.	Central	Total	Partial	Penumbral
The greatest eclipse of the series will occur on 2568 Jul 10, lasting 104 minutes, 29 seconds.	2622 Aug 13	2676 Sep 14	3091 May 25	3217 Aug 09

Eclipses are tabulated in three columns; every third eclipse in the same column is one exeligmos apart, so they all cast shadows over approximately the same parts of the Earth.

Series members 1–13 occur between 1973 and 2200:
1	2	3
1973 Jul 15	1991 Jul 26	2009 Aug 06
4	5	6
2027 Aug 17	2045 Aug 27	2063 Sep 07
7	8	9
2081 Sep 18	2099 Sep 29	2117 Oct 10
10	11	12
2135 Oct 22	2153 Nov 01	2171 Nov 12
13
2189 Nov 22

=== Tritos series ===
This eclipse is a part of a tritos cycle, repeating at alternating nodes every 135 synodic months (≈ 3986.63 days, or 11 years minus 1 month). Their appearance and longitude are irregular due to a lack of synchronization with the anomalistic month (period of perigee), but groupings of 3 tritos cycles (≈ 33 years minus 3 months) come close (≈ 434.044 anomalistic months), so eclipses are similar in these groupings.

Series members between 1801 and 2147
1809 Apr 30 (Saros 128)	1820 Mar 29 (Saros 129)	1831 Feb 26 (Saros 130)	1842 Jan 26 (Saros 131)	1852 Dec 26 (Saros 132)
1863 Nov 25 (Saros 133)	1874 Oct 25 (Saros 134)	1885 Sep 24 (Saros 135)	1896 Aug 23 (Saros 136)	1907 Jul 25 (Saros 137)
1918 Jun 24 (Saros 138)	1929 May 23 (Saros 139)	1940 Apr 22 (Saros 140)	1951 Mar 23 (Saros 141)	1962 Feb 19 (Saros 142)
1973 Jan 18 (Saros 143)	1983 Dec 20 (Saros 144)	1994 Nov 18 (Saros 145)	2005 Oct 17 (Saros 146)	2016 Sep 16 (Saros 147)
2027 Aug 17 (Saros 148)	2038 Jul 16 (Saros 149)	2049 Jun 15 (Saros 150)		
			2114 Dec 12 (Saros 156)	
	2147 Sep 09 (Saros 159)			

=== Inex series ===
This eclipse is a part of the long period inex cycle, repeating at alternating nodes, every 358 synodic months (≈ 10,571.95 days, or 29 years minus 20 days). Their appearance and longitude are irregular due to a lack of synchronization with the anomalistic month (period of perigee). However, groupings of 3 inex cycles (≈ 87 years minus 2 months) comes close (≈ 1,151.02 anomalistic months), so eclipses are similar in these groupings.

Series members between 1801 and 2200
1825 Jan 04 (Saros 141)	1853 Dec 15 (Saros 142)	1882 Nov 25 (Saros 143)
1911 Nov 06 (Saros 144)	1940 Oct 16 (Saros 145)	1969 Sep 25 (Saros 146)
1998 Sep 06 (Saros 147)	2027 Aug 17 (Saros 148)	2056 Jul 26 (Saros 149)
2085 Jul 07 (Saros 150)	2114 Jun 18 (Saros 151)	2143 May 28 (Saros 152)
2172 May 08 (Saros 153)

=== Half-Saros cycle ===
A lunar eclipse will be preceded and followed by solar eclipses by 9 years and 5.5 days (a half saros). This lunar eclipse is related to two partial solar eclipses of Solar Saros 155.

August 11, 2018	August 21, 2036

== See also ==
- List of lunar eclipses and List of 21st-century lunar eclipses
