= Lunar Saros 149 =

Series of lunar eclipses

Member 3
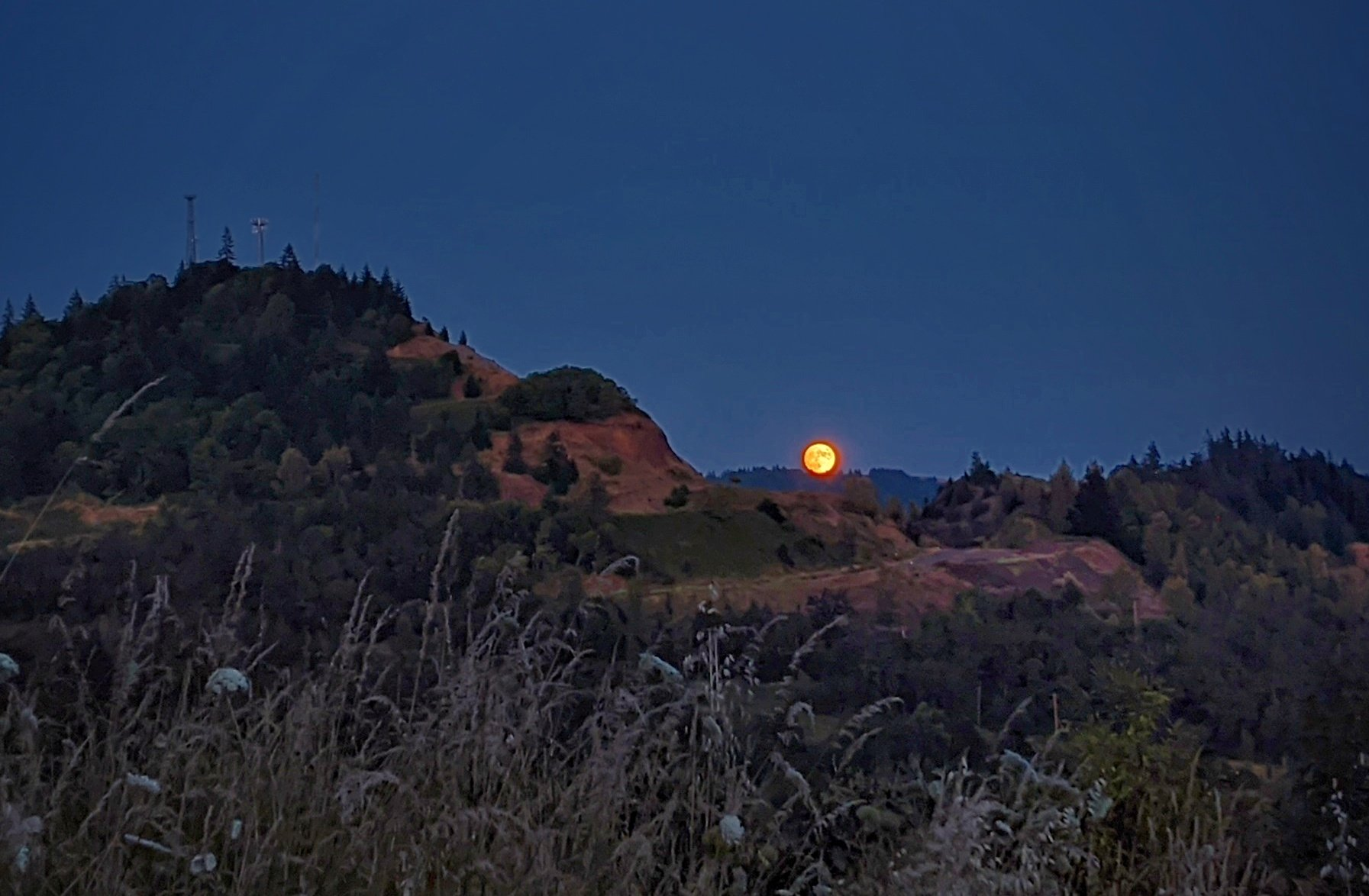
2020 Jul 05

Saros cycle series 149 for lunar eclipses occurs at the moon's descending node, repeats every 18 years 11 and 1/3 days. It contains 71 events (57 listed before 3000).

Cat.	Saros	Mem	Date	Time UT (hr:mn)	Type	Gamma	Magnitude	Duration (min)			Contacts UT (hr:mn)						Chart
Cat.	Saros	Mem	Date	Greatest	Type	Gamma	Magnitude	Pen.	Par.	Tot.	P1	P4	U1	U2	U3	U4	Chart
09614	149	1	1984 Jun 13	14:26:39	Penumbral	-1.5239	-0.9414	73.0			13:50:09	15:03:09					
09655	149	2	2002 Jun 24	21:28:13	Penumbral	-1.4439	-0.7925	129.1			20:23:40	22:32:46					
09696	149	3	2020 Jul 05	4:31:12	Penumbral	-1.3638	-0.6436	165.0			3:08:42	5:53:42					
09737	149	4	2038 Jul 16	11:35:56	Penumbral	-1.2837	-0.4952	192.4			9:59:44	13:12:08					
09777	149	5	2056 Jul 26	18:43:24	Penumbral	-1.2048	-0.3489	214.4			16:56:12	20:30:36					
09818	149	6	2074 Aug 07	1:56:03	Penumbral	-1.1291	-0.2091	232.2			23:59:57	3:52:09					
09859	149	7	2092 Aug 17	9:13:59	Penumbral	-1.0568	-0.0757	246.7			7:10:38	11:17:20					
09901	149	8	2110 Aug 29	16:38:48	Partial	-0.9893	0.0488	258.6	49.8		14:29:30	18:48:06	16:13:54			17:03:42	
09943	149	9	2128 Sep 09	0:10:30	Partial	-0.9266	0.1642	268.2	89.6		21:56:24	2:24:36	23:25:42			0:55:18	
09986	149	10	2146 Sep 20	7:51:28	Partial	-0.8707	0.2669	275.9	112.3		5:33:31	10:09:25	6:55:19			8:47:37	
10030	149	11	2164 Sep 30	15:40:32	Partial	-0.8209	0.3581	282.0	128.0		13:19:32	18:01:32	14:36:32			16:44:32	
10073	149	12	2182 Oct 11	23:38:06	Partial	-0.7776	0.4376	286.8	139.4		21:14:42	2:01:30	22:28:24			0:47:48	
10116	149	13	2200 Oct 23	7:44:43	Partial	-0.7411	0.5044	290.4	147.8		5:19:31	10:09:55	6:30:49			8:58:37	
10160	149	14	2218 Nov 03	16:00:25	Partial	-0.7113	0.5589	293.0	153.8		13:33:55	18:26:55	14:43:31			17:17:19	
10204	149	15	2236 Nov 14	0:24:12	Partial	-0.6879	0.6019	294.8	158.2		21:56:48	2:51:36	23:05:06			1:43:18	
10249	149	16	2254 Nov 25	8:54:59	Partial	-0.6696	0.6353	296.0	161.3		6:26:59	11:22:59	7:34:20			10:15:38	
10295	149	17	2272 Dec 05	17:32:31	Partial	-0.6565	0.6596	296.7	163.3		15:04:10	20:00:52	16:10:52			18:54:10	
10342	149	18	2290 Dec 17	2:15:35	Partial	-0.6473	0.6768	296.9	164.6		23:47:08	4:44:02	0:53:17			3:37:53	
10389	149	19	2308 Dec 28	11:01:33	Partial	-0.6401	0.6906	296.9	165.6		8:33:06	13:30:00	9:38:45			12:24:21	
10435	149	20	2327 Jan 08	19:50:18	Partial	-0.6349	0.7008	296.7	166.3		17:21:57	22:18:39	18:27:09			21:13:27	
10481	149	21	2345 Jan 19	4:38:50	Partial	-0.6290	0.7125	296.6	167.1		2:10:32	7:07:08	3:15:17			6:02:23	
10526	149	22	2363 Jan 30	13:27:21	Partial	-0.6231	0.7245	296.4	167.9		10:59:09	15:55:33	12:03:24			14:51:18	
10571	149	23	2381 Feb 09	22:11:31	Partial	-0.6131	0.7442	296.6	169.4		19:43:13	0:39:49	20:46:49			23:36:13	
10615	149	24	2399 Feb 21	6:53:33	Partial	-0.6013	0.7675	297.0	171.1		4:25:03	9:22:03	5:28:00			8:19:06	
10660	149	25	2417 Mar 03	15:29:02	Partial	-0.5837	0.8015	297.8	173.7		13:00:08	17:57:56	14:02:11			16:55:53	
10704	149	26	2435 Mar 14	23:59:26	Partial	-0.5619	0.8434	298.9	176.7		21:29:59	2:28:53	22:31:05			1:27:47	
10748	149	27	2453 Mar 25	8:21:32	Partial	-0.5329	0.8982	300.5	180.5		5:51:17	10:51:47	6:51:17			9:51:47	
10790	149	28	2471 Apr 05	16:38:08	Partial	-0.4993	0.9619	302.4	184.6		14:06:56	19:09:20	15:05:50			18:10:26	
10832	149	29	2489 Apr 16	0:46:37	Total	-0.4585	1.0385	304.5	189.0	29.0	22:14:22	3:18:52	23:12:07	0:32:07	1:01:07	2:21:07	
10873	149	30	2507 Apr 28	8:48:07	Total	-0.4117	1.1261	306.8	193.6	51.0	6:14:43	11:21:31	7:11:19	8:22:37	9:13:37	10:24:55	
10914	149	31	2525 May 8	16:42:30	Total	-0.3589	1.2244	309.2	198.0	66.0	14:07:54	19:17:06	15:03:30	16:09:30	17:15:30	18:21:30	
10955	149	32	2543 May 20	0:31:08	Total	-0.3011	1.3317	311.4	202.1	77.5	21:55:26	3:06:50	22:50:05	23:52:23	1:09:53	2:12:11	
10997	149	33	2561 May 30	8:13:38	Total	-0.2381	1.4485	313.5	205.7	86.4	5:36:53	10:50:23	6:30:47	7:30:26	8:56:50	9:56:29	
11038	149	34	2579 Jun 10	15:51:26	Total	-0.1708	1.5728	315.2	208.5	92.9	13:13:50	18:29:02	14:07:11	15:04:59	16:37:53	17:35:41	
11078	149	35	2597 Jun 20	23:25:26	Total	-0.1005	1.7025	316.4	210.5	97.3	20:47:14	2:03:38	21:40:11	22:36:47	0:14:05	1:10:41	
11118	149	36	2615 Jul 03	6:57:20	Total	-0.0286	1.8347	317.0	211.5	99.3	4:18:50	9:35:50	5:11:35	6:07:41	7:46:59	8:43:05	
11157	149	37	2633 Jul 13	14:26:23	Total	0.0456	1.8033	317.1	211.5	99.1	11:47:50	17:04:56	12:40:38	13:36:50	15:15:56	16:12:08	
11198	149	38	2651 Jul 24	21:56:01	Total	0.1192	1.6679	316.6	210.4	96.5	19:17:43	0:34:19	20:10:49	21:07:46	22:44:16	23:41:13	
11240	149	39	2669 Aug 04	5:25:20	Total	0.1927	1.5324	315.4	208.2	91.3	2:47:38	8:03:02	3:41:14	4:39:41	6:10:59	7:09:26	
11283	149	40	2687 Aug 15	12:57:37	Total	0.2634	1.4016	313.7	205.0	83.4	10:20:46	15:34:28	11:15:07	12:15:55	13:39:19	14:40:07	
11326	149	41	2705 Aug 26	20:31:01	Total	0.3328	1.2731	311.5	200.7	72.0	17:55:16	23:06:46	18:50:40	19:55:01	21:07:01	22:11:22	
11369	149	42	2723 Sep 07	4:10:10	Total	0.3969	1.1539	308.9	195.8	56.2	1:35:43	6:44:37	2:32:16	3:42:04	4:38:16	5:48:04	
11411	149	43	2741 Sep 17	11:52:55	Total	0.4576	1.0408	306.0	190.2	29.9	9:19:55	14:25:55	10:17:49	11:37:58	12:07:52	13:28:01	
11455	149	44	2759 Sep 28	19:42:45	Partial	0.5121	0.9387	303.1	184.2		17:11:12	22:14:18	18:10:39			21:14:51	
11499	149	45	2777 Oct 09	3:37:45	Partial	0.5620	0.8451	300.2	177.9		1:07:39	6:07:51	2:08:48			5:06:42	
11545	149	46	2795 Oct 20	11:41:11	Partial	0.6046	0.7647	297.5	171.8		9:12:26	14:09:56	10:15:17			13:07:05	
11591	149	47	2813 Oct 30	19:50:33	Partial	0.6418	0.6941	295.1	165.9		17:23:00	22:18:06	18:27:36			21:13:30	
11639	149	48	2831 Nov 11	4:07:08	Partial	0.6729	0.6349	293.0	160.4		1:40:38	6:33:38	2:46:56			5:27:20	
11685	149	49	2849 Nov 21	12:30:21	Partial	0.6981	0.5864	291.4	155.7		10:04:39	14:56:03	11:12:30			13:48:12	
11731	149	50	2867 Dec 02	21:00:11	Partial	0.7178	0.5479	290.3	151.7		18:35:02	23:25:20	19:44:20			22:16:02	
11777	149	51	2885 Dec 13	5:35:06	Partial	0.7328	0.5185	289.7	148.5		3:10:15	7:59:57	4:20:51			6:49:21	
11823	149	52	2903 Dec 25	14:13:38	Partial	0.7445	0.4951	289.3	145.9		11:48:59	16:38:17	13:00:41			15:26:35	
11868	149	53	2922 Jan 04	22:55:38	Partial	0.7529	0.4781	289.4	144.1		20:30:56	1:20:20	21:43:35			0:07:41	
11913	149	54	2940 Jan 16	7:38:56	Partial	0.7602	0.4633	289.4	142.5		5:14:14	10:03:38	6:27:41			8:50:11	
11959	149	55	2958 Jan 26	16:21:51	Partial	0.7672	0.4493	289.5	140.9		13:57:06	18:46:36	15:11:24			17:32:18	
12005	149	56	2976 Feb 07	1:03:02	Partial	0.7754	0.4333	289.5	139.1		22:38:17	3:27:47	23:53:29			2:12:35	
12049	149	57	2994 Feb 17	9:41:01	Partial	0.7857	0.4137	289.1	136.7		7:16:28	12:05:34	8:32:40			10:49:22	

== See also ==
- List of lunar eclipses
  - List of Saros series for lunar eclipses
