= August 2009 lunar eclipse =

Penumbral lunar eclipse 6 August 2009

- Penumbral eclipse
- This subtle penumbral eclipse covered the southern part of the Moon as shown in this animation by John Walker, viewed from Lignières, Switzerland.
- Date: August 6, 2009
- Gamma: 1.3572
- Magnitude: −0.6642
- Saros cycle: 148 (3 of 71)
- Penumbral: 189 minutes, 47 seconds
Contacts (UTC)
- P1: 23:04:21
- Greatest: 0:39:11
- P4: 2:14:08

A penumbral lunar eclipse occurred at the Moon’s ascending node of orbit on Thursday, August 6, 2009, with an umbral magnitude of −0.6642. A lunar eclipse occurs when the Moon moves into the Earth's shadow, causing the Moon to be darkened. A penumbral lunar eclipse occurs when part or all of the Moon's near side passes into the Earth's penumbra. Unlike a solar eclipse, which can only be viewed from a relatively small area of the world, a lunar eclipse may be viewed from anywhere on the night side of Earth. Occurring about 2.1 days after apogee (on August 3, 2009, at 22:40 UTC), the Moon's apparent diameter was smaller.

This eclipse was the third of four lunar eclipses in 2009, with the others occurring on February 9 (penumbral), July 7 (penumbral), and December 31 (partial).

== Visibility ==
The eclipse was completely visible over South America, Africa, and Europe, seen rising over much of North America and setting over central and south Asia.

Hourly motion shown right to left	The Moon's hourly motion across the Earth's shadow in the constellation of Capricornus.
Visibility map

== Gallery ==
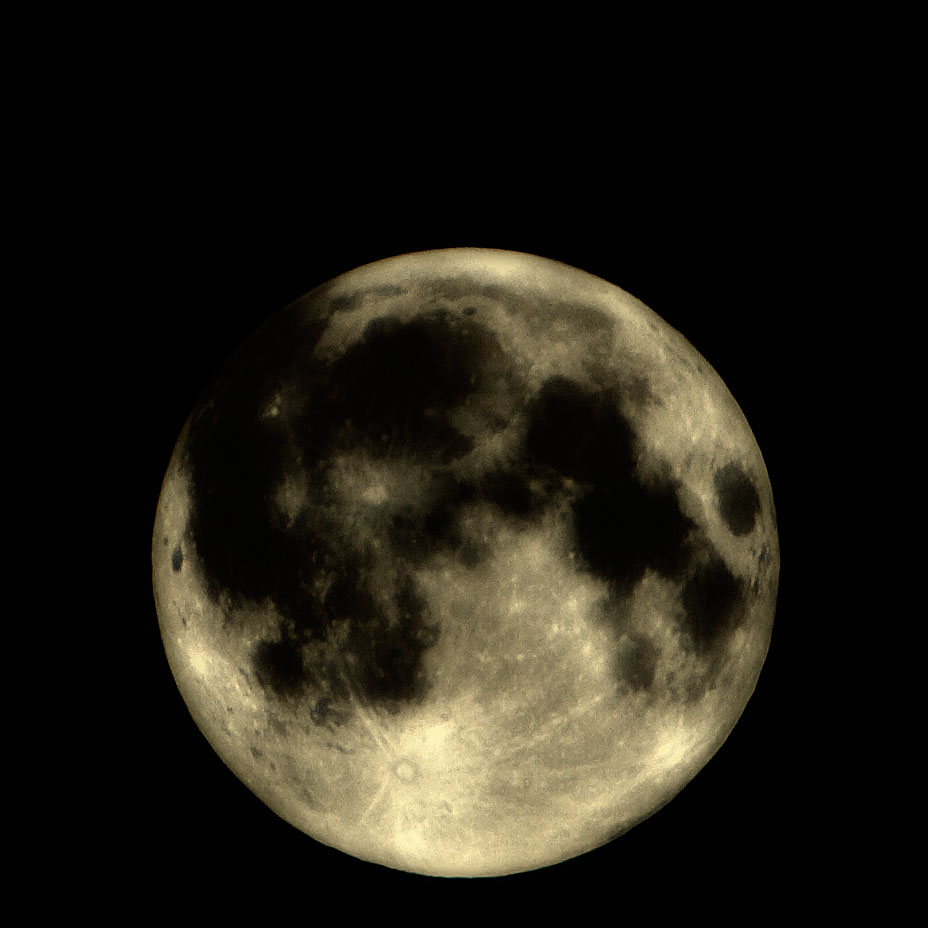
From France, 23:31 UTC

== Eclipse details ==
Shown below is a table displaying details about this particular lunar eclipse. It describes various parameters pertaining to this eclipse.

August 6, 2009 Lunar Eclipse Parameters
Parameter	Value
Penumbral Magnitude	0.40379
Umbral Magnitude	−0.66417
Gamma	1.35724
Sun Right Ascension	09h04m42.0s
Sun Declination	+16°42'38.9"
Sun Semi-Diameter	15'46.1"
Sun Equatorial Horizontal Parallax	08.7"
Moon Right Ascension	21h02m46.3s
Moon Declination	-15°34'32.9"
Moon Semi-Diameter	14'45.9"
Moon Equatorial Horizontal Parallax	0°54'11.4"
ΔT	66.0 s

== Eclipse season ==
This eclipse is part of an eclipse season, a period, roughly every six months, when eclipses occur. Only two (or occasionally three) eclipse seasons occur each year, and each season lasts about 35 days and repeats just short of six months (173 days) later; thus two full eclipse seasons always occur each year. Either two or three eclipses happen each eclipse season. In the sequence below, each eclipse is separated by a fortnight. The first and last eclipse in this sequence is separated by one synodic month.

Eclipse season of July–August 2009
July 7 Ascending node (full moon)	July 22 Descending node (new moon)	August 6 Ascending node (full moon)
Penumbral lunar eclipse Lunar Saros 110	Total solar eclipse Solar Saros 136	Penumbral lunar eclipse Lunar Saros 148

== Related eclipses ==
=== Eclipses in 2009 ===
- An annular solar eclipse on January 26.
- A penumbral lunar eclipse on February 9.
- A penumbral lunar eclipse on July 7.
- A total solar eclipse on July 22.
- A penumbral lunar eclipse on August 6.
- A partial lunar eclipse on December 31.

=== Metonic ===
- Preceded by: Lunar eclipse of October 17, 2005
- Followed by: Lunar eclipse of May 25, 2013

=== Tzolkinex ===
- Preceded by: Lunar eclipse of June 24, 2002
- Followed by: Lunar eclipse of September 16, 2016

=== Half-Saros ===
- Preceded by: Solar eclipse of July 31, 2000
- Followed by: Solar eclipse of August 11, 2018

=== Tritos ===
- Preceded by: Lunar eclipse of September 6, 1998
- Followed by: Lunar eclipse of July 5, 2020

=== Lunar Saros 148 ===
- Preceded by: Lunar eclipse of July 26, 1991
- Followed by: Lunar eclipse of August 17, 2027

=== Inex ===
- Preceded by: Lunar eclipse of August 26, 1980
- Followed by: Lunar eclipse of July 16, 2038

=== Triad ===
- Preceded by: Lunar eclipse of October 6, 1922
- Followed by: Lunar eclipse of June 6, 2096

=== Lunar eclipses of 2006–2009 ===
This eclipse is a member of a semester series. An eclipse in a semester series of lunar eclipses repeats approximately every 177 days and 4 hours (a semester) at alternating nodes of the Moon's orbit.

The lunar eclipses on July 7, 2009 (penumbral) and December 31, 2009 (partial) occur in the next lunar year eclipse set.

Lunar eclipse series sets from 2006 to 2009
Descending node				Ascending node			
Saros	Date Viewing	Type Chart	Gamma	Saros	Date Viewing	Type Chart	Gamma
113	2006 Mar 14	Penumbral	1.0211	118	2006 Sep 7	Partial	−0.9262
123	2007 Mar 03	Total	0.3175	128	2007 Aug 28	Total	−0.2146
133	2008 Feb 21	Total	−0.3992	138	2008 Aug 16	Partial	0.5646
143	2009 Feb 09	Penumbral	−1.0640	148	2009 Aug 06	Penumbral	1.3572

=== Saros 148 ===
This eclipse is a part of Saros series 148, repeating every 18 years, 11 days, and containing 70 events. The series started with a penumbral lunar eclipse on July 15, 1973. It contains partial eclipses from October 10, 2117 through May 5, 2460; total eclipses from May 17, 2478 through September 14, 2676; and a second set of partial eclipses from September 25, 2694 through May 25, 3091. The series ends at member 70 as a penumbral eclipse on August 9, 3217.

The longest duration of totality will be produced by member 37 at 104 minutes, 29 seconds on July 10, 2568. All eclipses in this series occur at the Moon’s ascending node of orbit.

Greatest	First			
The greatest eclipse of the series will occur on 2568 Jul 10, lasting 104 minutes, 29 seconds.	Penumbral	Partial	Total	Central
The greatest eclipse of the series will occur on 2568 Jul 10, lasting 104 minutes, 29 seconds.	1973 Jul 15	2117 Oct 10	2478 May 25	2514 Jun 08
The greatest eclipse of the series will occur on 2568 Jul 10, lasting 104 minutes, 29 seconds.	Last			
The greatest eclipse of the series will occur on 2568 Jul 10, lasting 104 minutes, 29 seconds.	Central	Total	Partial	Penumbral
The greatest eclipse of the series will occur on 2568 Jul 10, lasting 104 minutes, 29 seconds.	2622 Aug 13	2676 Sep 14	3091 May 25	3217 Aug 09

Eclipses are tabulated in three columns; every third eclipse in the same column is one exeligmos apart, so they all cast shadows over approximately the same parts of the Earth.

Series members 1–13 occur between 1973 and 2200:
1	2	3
1973 Jul 15	1991 Jul 26	2009 Aug 06
4	5	6
2027 Aug 17	2045 Aug 27	2063 Sep 07
7	8	9
2081 Sep 18	2099 Sep 29	2117 Oct 10
10	11	12
2135 Oct 22	2153 Nov 01	2171 Nov 12
13
2189 Nov 22

=== Tritos series ===
This eclipse is a part of a tritos cycle, repeating at alternating nodes every 135 synodic months (≈ 3986.63 days, or 11 years minus 1 month). Their appearance and longitude are irregular due to a lack of synchronization with the anomalistic month (period of perigee), but groupings of 3 tritos cycles (≈ 33 years minus 3 months) come close (≈ 434.044 anomalistic months), so eclipses are similar in these groupings.

Series members between 1801 and 2096
1802 Mar 19 (Saros 129)	1813 Feb 15 (Saros 130)	1824 Jan 16 (Saros 131)	1834 Dec 16 (Saros 132)	1845 Nov 14 (Saros 133)
1856 Oct 13 (Saros 134)	1867 Sep 14 (Saros 135)	1878 Aug 13 (Saros 136)	1889 Jul 12 (Saros 137)	1900 Jun 13 (Saros 138)
1911 May 13 (Saros 139)	1922 Apr 11 (Saros 140)	1933 Mar 12 (Saros 141)	1944 Feb 09 (Saros 142)	1955 Jan 08 (Saros 143)
1965 Dec 08 (Saros 144)	1976 Nov 06 (Saros 145)	1987 Oct 07 (Saros 146)	1998 Sep 06 (Saros 147)	2009 Aug 06 (Saros 148)
2020 Jul 05 (Saros 149)	2031 Jun 05 (Saros 150)			
		2096 Nov 29 (Saros 156)		

=== Inex series ===
This eclipse is a part of the long period inex cycle, repeating at alternating nodes, every 358 synodic months (≈ 10,571.95 days, or 29 years minus 20 days). Their appearance and longitude are irregular due to a lack of synchronization with the anomalistic month (period of perigee). However, groupings of 3 inex cycles (≈ 87 years minus 2 months) comes close (≈ 1,151.02 anomalistic months), so eclipses are similar in these groupings.

Series members between 1801 and 2154
1806 Dec 25 (Saros 141)	1835 Dec 05 (Saros 142)	1864 Nov 13 (Saros 143)
1893 Oct 25 (Saros 144)	1922 Oct 06 (Saros 145)	1951 Sep 15 (Saros 146)
1980 Aug 26 (Saros 147)	2009 Aug 06 (Saros 148)	2038 Jul 16 (Saros 149)
2067 Jun 27 (Saros 150)	2096 Jun 06 (Saros 151)	2125 May 17 (Saros 152)
2154 Apr 28 (Saros 153)

=== Half-Saros cycle ===
A lunar eclipse will be preceded and followed by solar eclipses by 9 years and 5.5 days (a half saros). This lunar eclipse is related to two partial solar eclipses of Solar Saros 155.

July 31, 2000	August 11, 2018

== See also ==
- List of lunar eclipses and List of 21st-century lunar eclipses
