= Solar eclipse of May 30, 1984 =

20th-century annular solar eclipse

- Annular eclipse
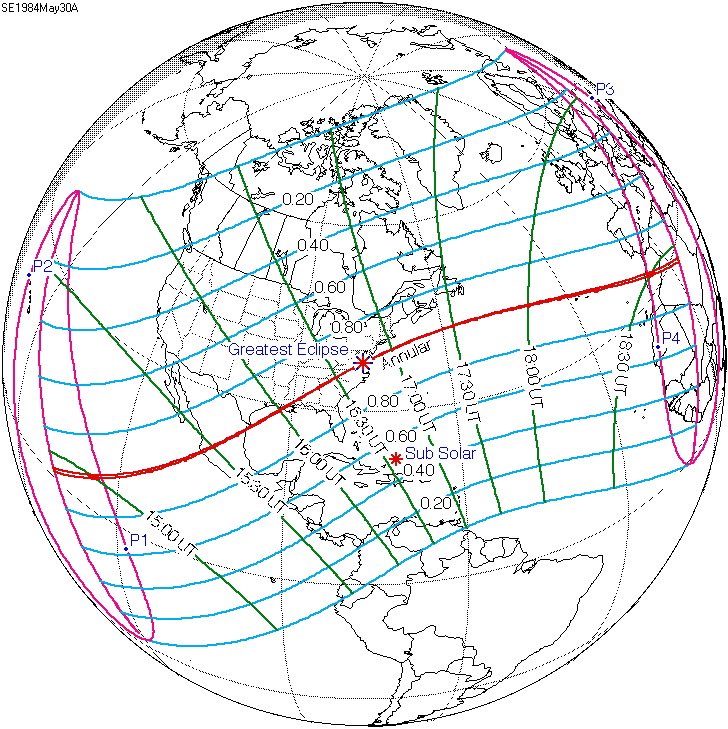
- Map
- Gamma: 0.2755
- Magnitude: 0.998

Maximum eclipse
- Duration: 11 s (0 min 11 s)
- Coordinates: 37.5°N 76.7°W
- Max. width of band: 7 km (4.3 mi)

Times (UTC)
- Greatest eclipse: 16:45:41

References
- Saros: 137 (34 of 70)
- Catalog # (SE5000): 9474

An annular solar eclipse occurred at the Moon's ascending node of orbit on Wednesday, May 30, 1984, with a magnitude of 0.998. A solar eclipse occurs when the Moon passes between Earth and the Sun, thereby totally or partly obscuring the image of the Sun for a viewer on Earth. An annular solar eclipse occurs when the Moon's apparent diameter is smaller than the Sun's, blocking most of the Sun's light and causing the Sun to look like an annulus (ring). The Moon's apparent diameter was near the average diameter because it occurred 6.6 days after apogee (on May 24, 1984, at 2:00 UTC) and 7.8 days before perigee (on June 7, 1984, at 12:20 UTC).

This was the first annular solar eclipse visible in the United States in 33 years.

Annularity was visible in Mexico, Louisiana, Mississippi, Alabama, Georgia, South Carolina, North Carolina and Virginia in the United States, the Azores Islands, Morocco and Algeria. A partial eclipse was visible for parts of Hawaii, North America, Central America, the Caribbean, northern South America, Western Europe, and Northwest Africa.

== Observations ==
During this eclipse, the apex of the Moon's umbral cone was very close to the Earth's surface, and the magnitude was very large. The edges of the Moon and the Sun were very close to each other as seen from the Earth. Images of the chromosphere and Baily's beads on the lunar limb, which are usually only visible during a total solar eclipse, could also be taken. A team of the University of Florida took images, about half of which being those of the chromosphere and the other half the photosphere, in Greenville, South Carolina. Jay Pasachoff led a team from Williams College, Massachusetts to Picayune, Mississippi.

== Eclipse details ==
Shown below are two tables displaying details about this particular solar eclipse. The first table outlines times at which the Moon's penumbra or umbra attains the specific parameter, and the second table describes various other parameters pertaining to this eclipse.

May 30, 1984 Solar Eclipse Times
Event	Time (UTC)
First Penumbral External Contact	1984 May 30 at 13:55:14.3 UTC
First Umbral External Contact	1984 May 30 at 14:57:46.9 UTC
First Central Line	1984 May 30 at 14:58:22.6 UTC
Greatest Duration	1984 May 30 at 14:58:22.6 UTC
First Umbral Internal Contact	1984 May 30 at 14:58:58.3 UTC
First Penumbral Internal Contact	1984 May 30 at 16:06:12.7 UTC
Greatest Eclipse	1984 May 30 at 16:45:41.5 UTC
Ecliptic Conjunction	1984 May 30 at 16:48:44.8 UTC
Equatorial Conjunction	1984 May 30 at 16:53:32.9 UTC
Last Penumbral Internal Contact	1984 May 30 at 17:25:00.1 UTC
Last Umbral Internal Contact	1984 May 30 at 18:32:21.8 UTC
Last Central Line	1984 May 30 at 18:32:54.6 UTC
Last Umbral External Contact	1984 May 30 at 18:33:27.3 UTC
Last Penumbral External Contact	1984 May 30 at 19:35:58.9 UTC

May 30, 1984 Solar Eclipse Parameters
Parameter	Value
Eclipse Magnitude	0.99801
Eclipse Obscuration	0.99602
Gamma	0.27552
Sun Right Ascension	04h31m02.1s
Sun Declination	+21°52'05.5"
Sun Semi-Diameter	15'46.4"
Sun Equatorial Horizontal Parallax	08.7"
Moon Right Ascension	04h30m45.4s
Moon Declination	+22°07'14.4"
Moon Semi-Diameter	15'30.3"
Moon Equatorial Horizontal Parallax	0°56'54.1"
ΔT	54.0 s

== Eclipse season ==
This eclipse is part of an eclipse season, a period, roughly every six months, when eclipses occur. Only two (or occasionally three) eclipse seasons occur each year, and each season lasts about 35 days and repeats just short of six months (173 days) later; thus two full eclipse seasons always occur each year. Either two or three eclipses happen each eclipse season. In the sequence below, each eclipse is separated by a fortnight. The first and last eclipse in this sequence is separated by one synodic month.

Eclipse season of May–June 1984
May 15 Descending node (full moon)	May 30 Ascending node (new moon)	June 13 Descending node (full moon)
Penumbral lunar eclipse Lunar Saros 111	Annular solar eclipse Solar Saros 137	Penumbral lunar eclipse Lunar Saros 149

== Related eclipses ==
=== Eclipses in 1984 ===
- A penumbral lunar eclipse on May 15.
- An annular solar eclipse on May 30.
- A penumbral lunar eclipse on June 13.
- A penumbral lunar eclipse on November 8.
- A total solar eclipse on November 22.

=== Metonic ===
- Preceded by: Solar eclipse of August 10, 1980
- Followed by: Solar eclipse of March 18, 1988

=== Tzolkinex ===
- Preceded by: Solar eclipse of April 18, 1977
- Followed by: Solar eclipse of July 11, 1991

=== Half-Saros ===
- Preceded by: Lunar eclipse of May 25, 1975
- Followed by: Lunar eclipse of June 4, 1993

=== Tritos ===
- Preceded by: Solar eclipse of June 30, 1973
- Followed by: Solar eclipse of April 29, 1995

=== Solar Saros 137 ===
- Preceded by: Solar eclipse of May 20, 1966
- Followed by: Solar eclipse of June 10, 2002

=== Inex ===
- Preceded by: Solar eclipse of June 20, 1955
- Followed by: Solar eclipse of May 10, 2013

=== Triad ===
- Preceded by: Solar eclipse of July 29, 1897
- Followed by: Solar eclipse of March 31, 2071

=== Solar eclipses of 1982–1985 ===
This eclipse is a member of a semester series. An eclipse in a semester series of solar eclipses repeats approximately every 177 days and 4 hours (a semester) at alternating nodes of the Moon's orbit.

The partial solar eclipses on January 25, 1982 and July 20, 1982 occur in the previous lunar year eclipse set.

Solar eclipse series sets from 1982 to 1985
Ascending node			Descending node		
Saros	Map	Gamma	Saros	Map	Gamma
117	June 21, 1982 Partial	−1.2102	122	December 15, 1982 Partial	1.1293
127	June 11, 1983 Total	−0.4947	132	December 4, 1983 Annular	0.4015
137	May 30, 1984 Annular	0.2755	142 Partial in Gisborne, New Zealand	November 22, 1984 Total	−0.3132
147	May 19, 1985 Partial	1.072	152	November 12, 1985 Total	−0.9795

=== Saros 137 ===
This eclipse is a part of Saros series 137, repeating every 18 years, 11 days, and containing 70 events. The series started with a partial solar eclipse on May 25, 1389. It contains total eclipses from August 20, 1533 through December 6, 1695; the first set of hybrid eclipses from December 17, 1713 through February 11, 1804; the first set of annular eclipses from February 21, 1822 through March 25, 1876; the second set of hybrid eclipses from April 6, 1894 through April 28, 1930; and the second set of annular eclipses from May 9, 1948 through April 13, 2507. The series ends at member 70 as a partial eclipse on June 28, 2633. Its eclipses are tabulated in three columns; every third eclipse in the same column is one exeligmos apart, so they all cast shadows over approximately the same parts of the Earth.

The longest duration of totality was produced by member 11 at 2 minutes, 55 seconds on September 10, 1569, and the longest duration of annularity will be produced by member 59 at 7 minutes, 5 seconds on February 28, 2435. All eclipses in this series occur at the Moon’s ascending node of orbit.

Series members 24–46 occur between 1801 and 2200:
24	25	26
February 11, 1804	February 21, 1822	March 4, 1840
27	28	29
March 15, 1858	March 25, 1876	April 6, 1894
30	31	32
April 17, 1912	April 28, 1930	May 9, 1948
33	34	35
May 20, 1966	May 30, 1984	June 10, 2002
36	37	38
June 21, 2020	July 2, 2038	July 12, 2056
39	40	41
July 24, 2074	August 3, 2092	August 15, 2110
42	43	44
August 25, 2128	September 6, 2146	September 16, 2164
45	46	
September 27, 2182	October 9, 2200	

=== Metonic series ===
The metonic series repeats eclipses every 19 years (6939.69 days), lasting about 5 cycles. Eclipses occur in nearly the same calendar date. In addition, the octon subseries repeats 1/5 of that or every 3.8 years (1387.94 days). All eclipses in this table occur at the Moon's ascending node.

22 eclipse events between January 5, 1935 and August 11, 2018
January 4–5	October 23–24	August 10–12	May 30–31	March 18–19
111	113	115	117	119
January 5, 1935		August 12, 1942	May 30, 1946	March 18, 1950
121	123	125	127	129
January 5, 1954	October 23, 1957	August 11, 1961	May 30, 1965	March 18, 1969
131	133	135	137	139
January 4, 1973	October 23, 1976	August 10, 1980	May 30, 1984	March 18, 1988
141	143	145	147	149
January 4, 1992	October 24, 1995	August 11, 1999	May 31, 2003	March 19, 2007
151	153	155		
January 4, 2011	October 23, 2014	August 11, 2018		

=== Tritos series ===
This eclipse is a part of a tritos cycle, repeating at alternating nodes every 135 synodic months (≈ 3986.63 days, or 11 years minus 1 month). Their appearance and longitude are irregular due to a lack of synchronization with the anomalistic month (period of perigee), but groupings of 3 tritos cycles (≈ 33 years minus 3 months) come close (≈ 434.044 anomalistic months), so eclipses are similar in these groupings.

Series members between 1801 and 2200
October 9, 1809 (Saros 121)	September 7, 1820 (Saros 122)	August 7, 1831 (Saros 123)	July 8, 1842 (Saros 124)	June 6, 1853 (Saros 125)
May 6, 1864 (Saros 126)	April 6, 1875 (Saros 127)	March 5, 1886 (Saros 128)	February 1, 1897 (Saros 129)	January 3, 1908 (Saros 130)
December 3, 1918 (Saros 131)	November 1, 1929 (Saros 132)	October 1, 1940 (Saros 133)	September 1, 1951 (Saros 134)	July 31, 1962 (Saros 135)
June 30, 1973 (Saros 136)	May 30, 1984 (Saros 137)	April 29, 1995 (Saros 138)	March 29, 2006 (Saros 139)	February 26, 2017 (Saros 140)
January 26, 2028 (Saros 141)	December 26, 2038 (Saros 142)	November 25, 2049 (Saros 143)	October 24, 2060 (Saros 144)	September 23, 2071 (Saros 145)
August 24, 2082 (Saros 146)	July 23, 2093 (Saros 147)	June 22, 2104 (Saros 148)	May 24, 2115 (Saros 149)	April 22, 2126 (Saros 150)
March 21, 2137 (Saros 151)	February 19, 2148 (Saros 152)	January 19, 2159 (Saros 153)	December 18, 2169 (Saros 154)	November 17, 2180 (Saros 155)
October 18, 2191 (Saros 156)

=== Inex series ===
This eclipse is a part of the long period inex cycle, repeating at alternating nodes, every 358 synodic months (≈ 10,571.95 days, or 29 years minus 20 days). Their appearance and longitude are irregular due to a lack of synchronization with the anomalistic month (period of perigee). However, groupings of 3 inex cycles (≈ 87 years minus 2 months) comes close (≈ 1,151.02 anomalistic months), so eclipses are similar in these groupings.

Series members between 1801 and 2200
September 28, 1810 (Saros 131)	September 7, 1839 (Saros 132)	August 18, 1868 (Saros 133)
July 29, 1897 (Saros 134)	July 9, 1926 (Saros 135)	June 20, 1955 (Saros 136)
May 30, 1984 (Saros 137)	May 10, 2013 (Saros 138)	April 20, 2042 (Saros 139)
March 31, 2071 (Saros 140)	March 10, 2100 (Saros 141)	February 18, 2129 (Saros 142)
January 30, 2158 (Saros 143)	January 9, 2187 (Saros 144)	
