= June 1984 lunar eclipse =

Penumbral lunar eclipse June 13, 1984

- Penumbral eclipse
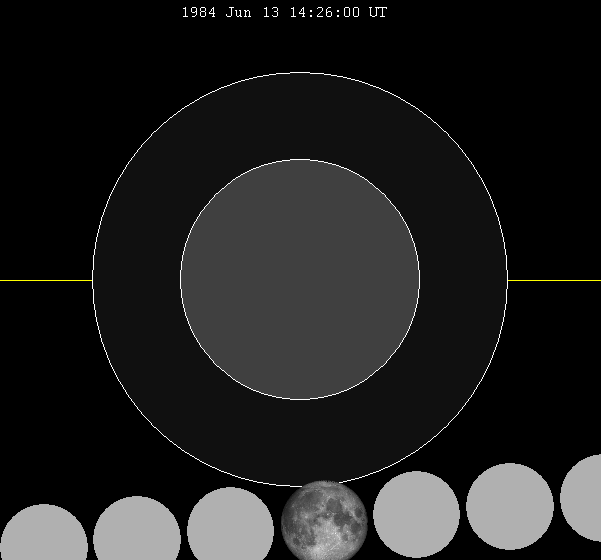
- The Moon's hourly motion shown right to left
- Date: June 13, 1984
- Gamma: −1.5240
- Magnitude: −0.9414
- Saros cycle: 149 (1 of 72)
- Penumbral: 73 minutes, 0 seconds
Contacts (UTC)
- P1: 13:49:05
- Greatest: 14:25:45
- P4: 15:02:05

A penumbral lunar eclipse occurred at the Moon’s descending node of orbit on Wednesday, June 13, 1984, with an umbral magnitude of −0.9414. A lunar eclipse occurs when the Moon moves into the Earth's shadow, causing the Moon to be darkened. A penumbral lunar eclipse occurs when part or all of the Moon's near side passes into the Earth's penumbra. Unlike a solar eclipse, which can only be viewed from a relatively small area of the world, a lunar eclipse may be viewed from anywhere on the night side of Earth. Occurring about 6.1 days after perigee (on June 7, 1984, at 12:25 UTC), the Moon's apparent diameter was larger.

This minor penumbral eclipse was visually imperceptible, but marked the first lunar eclipse in Lunar Saros 149.

== Visibility ==
The eclipse was completely visible over the eastern half of Asia, Australia, and Antarctica, seen rising over Madagascar and central Asia and setting over the eastern Pacific Ocean.

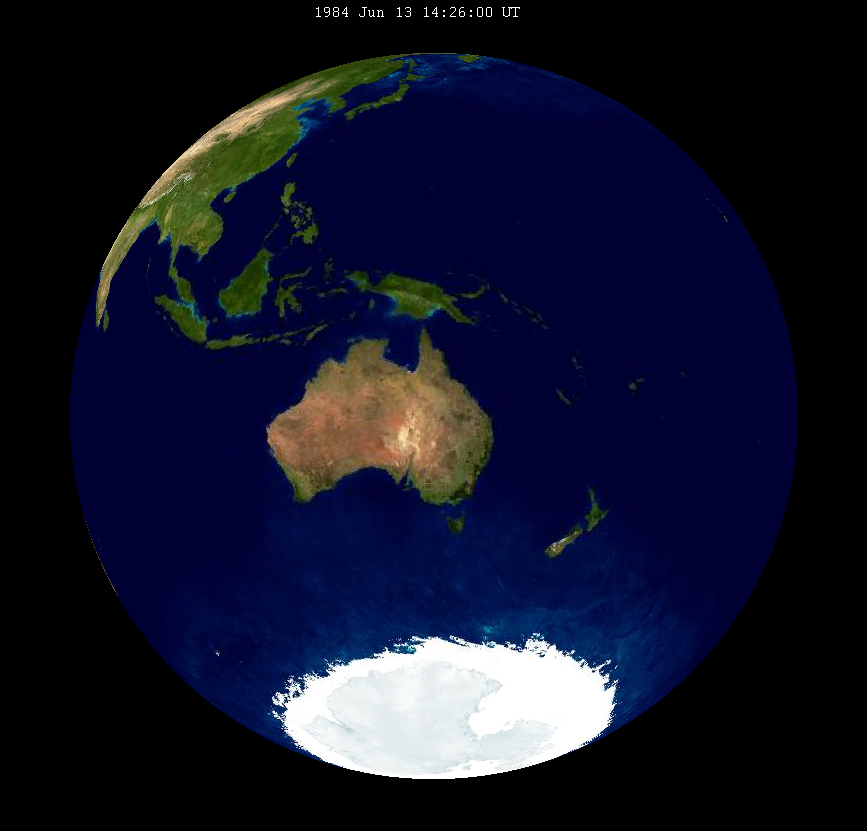
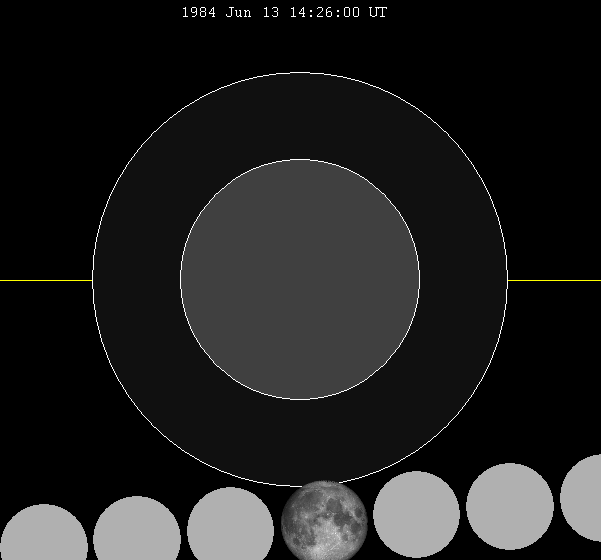

== Eclipse details ==
Shown below is a table displaying details about this particular solar eclipse. It describes various parameters pertaining to this eclipse.

June 13, 1984 Lunar Eclipse Parameters
Parameter	Value
Penumbral Magnitude	0.06474
Umbral Magnitude	−0.94137
Gamma	−1.52403
Sun Right Ascension	05h28m22.3s
Sun Declination	+23°14'34.9"
Sun Semi-Diameter	15'44.8"
Sun Equatorial Horizontal Parallax	08.7"
Moon Right Ascension	17h27m24.8s
Moon Declination	-24°41'08.0"
Moon Semi-Diameter	15'39.1"
Moon Equatorial Horizontal Parallax	0°57'26.4"
ΔT	54.0 s

== Eclipse season ==
This eclipse is part of an eclipse season, a period, roughly every six months, when eclipses occur. Only two (or occasionally three) eclipse seasons occur each year, and each season lasts about 35 days and repeats just short of six months (173 days) later; thus two full eclipse seasons always occur each year. Either two or three eclipses happen each eclipse season. In the sequence below, each eclipse is separated by a fortnight. The first and last eclipse in this sequence is separated by one synodic month.

Eclipse season of May–June 1984
May 15 Descending node (full moon)	May 30 Ascending node (new moon)	June 13 Descending node (full moon)
Penumbral lunar eclipse Lunar Saros 111	Annular solar eclipse Solar Saros 137	Penumbral lunar eclipse Lunar Saros 149

== Related eclipses ==
=== Eclipses in 1984 ===
- A penumbral lunar eclipse on May 15.
- An annular solar eclipse on May 30.
- A penumbral lunar eclipse on June 13.
- A penumbral lunar eclipse on November 8.
- A total solar eclipse on November 22.

=== Metonic ===
- Preceded by: Lunar eclipse of August 26, 1980

=== Tzolkinex ===
- Followed by: Lunar eclipse of July 26, 1991

=== Tritos ===
- Preceded by: Lunar eclipse of July 15, 1973

=== Lunar Saros 149 ===
- Followed by: Lunar eclipse of June 24, 2002

=== Inex ===
- Followed by: Lunar eclipse of May 25, 2013

=== Triad ===
- Preceded by: Lunar eclipse of August 12, 1897

=== Lunar eclipses of 1980–1984 ===
This eclipse is a member of a semester series. An eclipse in a semester series of lunar eclipses repeats approximately every 177 days and 4 hours (a semester) at alternating nodes of the Moon's orbit.

The penumbral lunar eclipses on March 1, 1980 and August 26, 1980 occur in the previous lunar year eclipse set, and the penumbral lunar eclipses on May 15, 1984 and November 8, 1984 occur in the next lunar year eclipse set.

Lunar eclipse series sets from 1980 to 1984
Descending node				Ascending node			
Saros	Date Viewing	Type Chart	Gamma	Saros	Date Viewing	Type Chart	Gamma
109	1980 Jul 27	Penumbral	1.4139	114	1981 Jan 20	Penumbral	−1.0142
119	1981 Jul 17	Partial	0.7045	124	1982 Jan 09	Total	−0.2916
129	1982 Jul 06	Total	−0.0579	134	1982 Dec 30	Total	0.3758
139	1983 Jun 25	Partial	−0.8152	144	1983 Dec 20	Penumbral	1.0747
149	1984 Jun 13	Penumbral	−1.5240				

=== Saros 149 ===
This eclipse is a part of Saros series 149, repeating every 18 years, 11 days, and containing 71 events. The series started with a penumbral lunar eclipse on June 13, 1984. It contains partial eclipses from August 29, 2110 through April 5, 2471; total eclipses from April 16, 2489 through September 17, 2741; and a second set of partial eclipses from September 28, 2759 through May 5, 3120. The series ends at member 71 as a penumbral eclipse on July 20, 3246.

The longest duration of totality will be produced by member 36 at 99 minutes, 18 seconds on July 3, 2615. All eclipses in this series occur at the Moon’s descending node of orbit.

Greatest	First			
The greatest eclipse of the series will occur on 2615 Jul 03, lasting 99 minutes, 18 seconds.	Penumbral	Partial	Total	Central
The greatest eclipse of the series will occur on 2615 Jul 03, lasting 99 minutes, 18 seconds.	1984 Jun 13	2110 Aug 29	2489 Apr 16	2561 May 30
The greatest eclipse of the series will occur on 2615 Jul 03, lasting 99 minutes, 18 seconds.	Last			
The greatest eclipse of the series will occur on 2615 Jul 03, lasting 99 minutes, 18 seconds.	Central	Total	Partial	Penumbral
The greatest eclipse of the series will occur on 2615 Jul 03, lasting 99 minutes, 18 seconds.	2687 Aug 15	2741 Sep 17	3120 May 05	3246 Jul 20

Eclipses are tabulated in three columns; every third eclipse in the same column is one exeligmos apart, so they all cast shadows over approximately the same parts of the Earth.

Series members 1–13 occur between 1984 and 2200:
1	2	3
1984 Jun 13	2002 Jun 24	2020 Jul 05
4	5	6
2038 Jul 16	2056 Jul 26	2074 Aug 07
7	8	9
2092 Aug 17	2110 Aug 29	2128 Sep 09
10	11	12
2146 Sep 20	2164 Sep 30	2182 Oct 11
13
2200 Oct 23

=== Tritos series ===
This eclipse is a part of a tritos cycle, repeating at alternating nodes every 135 synodic months (≈ 3986.63 days, or 11 years minus 1 month). Their appearance and longitude are irregular due to a lack of synchronization with the anomalistic month (period of perigee), but groupings of 3 tritos cycles (≈ 33 years minus 3 months) come close (≈ 434.044 anomalistic months), so eclipses are similar in these groupings.

Series members between 1801 and 2060
1809 Oct 23 (Saros 133)	1820 Sep 22 (Saros 134)	1831 Aug 23 (Saros 135)	1842 Jul 22 (Saros 136)	1853 Jun 21 (Saros 137)
1864 May 21 (Saros 138)	1875 Apr 20 (Saros 139)	1886 Mar 20 (Saros 140)	1897 Feb 17 (Saros 141)	1908 Jan 18 (Saros 142)
1918 Dec 17 (Saros 143)	1929 Nov 17 (Saros 144)	1940 Oct 16 (Saros 145)	1951 Sep 15 (Saros 146)	1962 Aug 15 (Saros 147)
1973 Jul 15 (Saros 148)	1984 Jun 13 (Saros 149)			
			2060 Nov 08 (Saros 156)	

=== Inex series ===
This eclipse is a part of the long period inex cycle, repeating at alternating nodes, every 358 synodic months (≈ 10,571.95 days, or 29 years minus 20 days). Their appearance and longitude are irregular due to a lack of synchronization with the anomalistic month (period of perigee). However, groupings of 3 inex cycles (≈ 87 years minus 2 months) comes close (≈ 1,151.02 anomalistic months), so eclipses are similar in these groupings.

Series members between 1801 and 2200
1810 Oct 12 (Saros 143)	1839 Sep 23 (Saros 144)	1868 Sep 02 (Saros 145)
1897 Aug 12 (Saros 146)	1926 Jul 25 (Saros 147)	
1984 Jun 13 (Saros 149)	2013 May 25 (Saros 150)	
	2187 Jan 24 (Saros 156)	

== See also ==
- List of lunar eclipses
- List of 20th-century lunar eclipses
