= July 1991 lunar eclipse =

Penumbral lunar eclipse July 26, 1991

- Penumbral eclipse
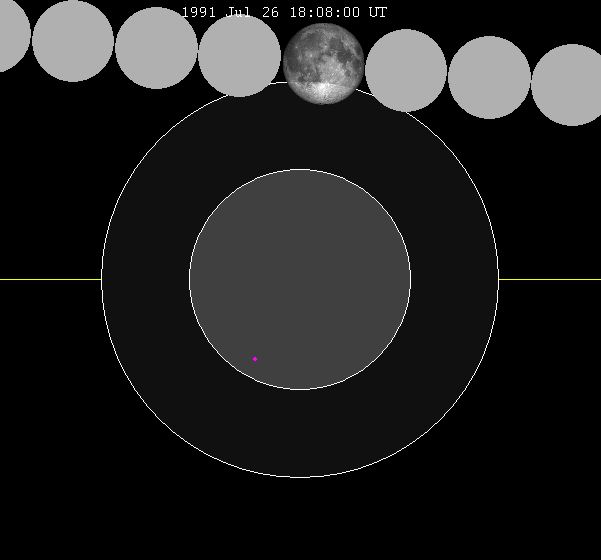
- The Moon's hourly motion shown right to left
- Date: July 26, 1991
- Gamma: 1.4370
- Magnitude: −0.8109
- Saros cycle: 148 (2 of 71)
- Penumbral: 152 minutes, 42 seconds
Contacts (UTC)
- P1: 16:51:35
- Greatest: 18:07:52
- P4: 19:24:16

A penumbral lunar eclipse occurred at the Moon’s ascending node of orbit on Friday, July 26, 1991, with an umbral magnitude of −0.8109. A lunar eclipse occurs when the Moon moves into the Earth's shadow, causing the Moon to be darkened. A penumbral lunar eclipse occurs when part or all of the Moon's near side passes into the Earth's penumbra. Unlike a solar eclipse, which can only be viewed from a relatively small area of the world, a lunar eclipse may be viewed from anywhere on the night side of Earth. Occurring about 2.25 days after apogee (on July 24, 1991, at 12:10 UTC), the Moon's apparent diameter was smaller.

This eclipse was the third of four lunar eclipses in 1991, with the others occurring on January 30 (penumbral), June 27 (penumbral), and December 21 (partial).

== Visibility ==
The eclipse was completely visible over east Africa, much of Asia, Australia, and Antarctica, seen rising over much of Europe and west and central Africa and setting over northeast Asia and the central Pacific Ocean.

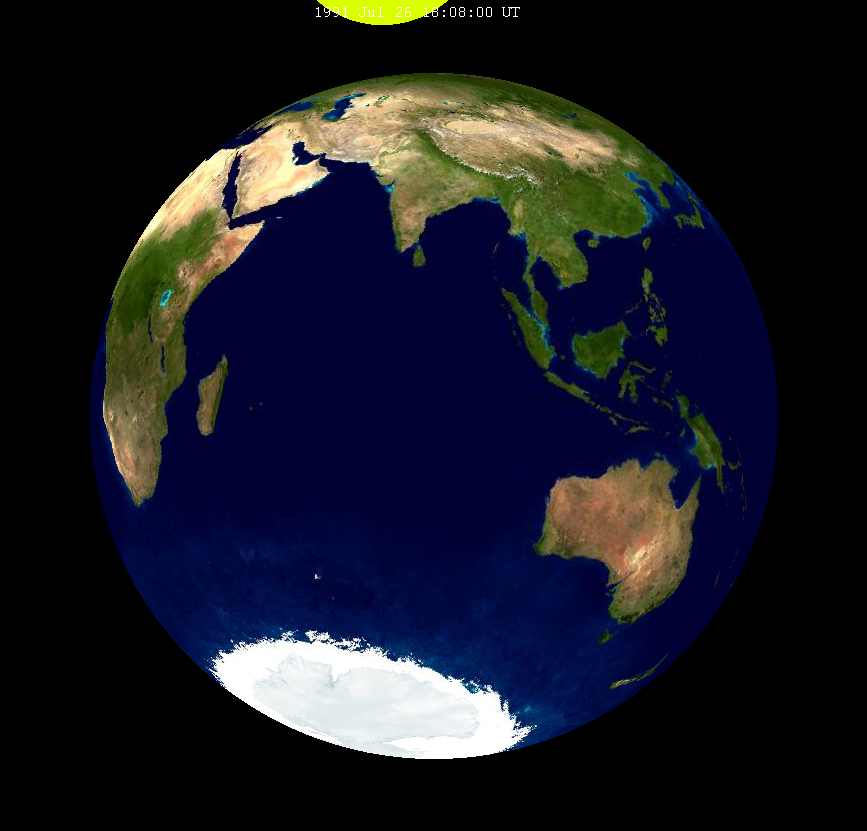
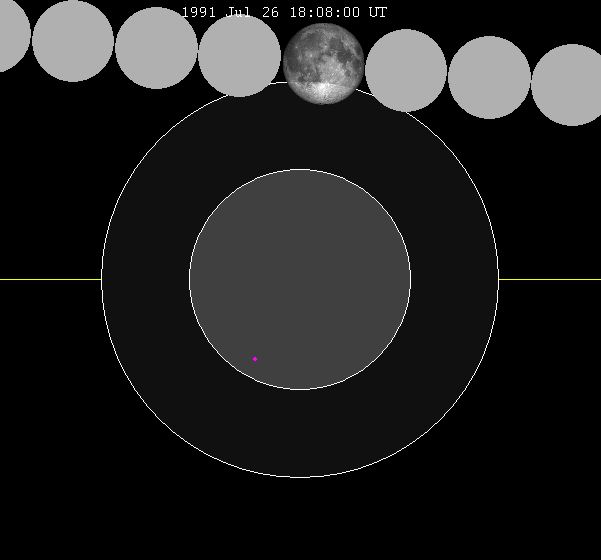

== Eclipse details ==
Shown below is a table displaying details about this particular solar eclipse. It describes various parameters pertaining to this eclipse.

July 26, 1991 Lunar Eclipse Parameters
Parameter	Value
Penumbral Magnitude	0.25425
Umbral Magnitude	−0.81093
Gamma	1.43698
Sun Right Ascension	08h22m14.5s
Sun Declination	+19°25'45.6"
Sun Semi-Diameter	15'44.9"
Sun Equatorial Horizontal Parallax	08.7"
Moon Right Ascension	20h20m28.0s
Moon Declination	-18°11'58.5"
Moon Semi-Diameter	14'47.1"
Moon Equatorial Horizontal Parallax	0°54'15.7"
ΔT	58.0 s

== Eclipse season ==
This eclipse is part of an eclipse season, a period, roughly every six months, when eclipses occur. Only two (or occasionally three) eclipse seasons occur each year, and each season lasts about 35 days and repeats just short of six months (173 days) later; thus two full eclipse seasons always occur each year. Either two or three eclipses happen each eclipse season. In the sequence below, each eclipse is separated by a fortnight. The first and last eclipse in this sequence is separated by one synodic month.

Eclipse season of June–July 1991
June 27 Ascending node (full moon)	July 11 Descending node (new moon)	July 26 Ascending node (full moon)
Penumbral lunar eclipse Lunar Saros 110	Total solar eclipse Solar Saros 136	Penumbral lunar eclipse Lunar Saros 148

== Related eclipses ==
=== Eclipses in 1991 ===
- An annular solar eclipse on January 15.
- A penumbral lunar eclipse on January 30.
- A penumbral lunar eclipse on June 27.
- A total solar eclipse on July 11.
- A penumbral lunar eclipse on July 26.
- A partial lunar eclipse on December 21.

=== Metonic ===
- Preceded by: Lunar eclipse of October 7, 1987

=== Tzolkinex ===
- Preceded by: Lunar eclipse of June 13, 1984
- Followed by: Lunar eclipse of September 6, 1998

=== Half-Saros ===
- Preceded by: Solar eclipse of July 20, 1982
- Followed by: Solar eclipse of July 31, 2000

=== Tritos ===
- Preceded by: Lunar eclipse of August 26, 1980
- Followed by: Lunar eclipse of June 24, 2002

=== Lunar Saros 148 ===
- Preceded by: Lunar eclipse of July 15, 1973
- Followed by: Lunar eclipse of August 6, 2009

=== Inex ===
- Preceded by: Lunar eclipse of August 15, 1962
- Followed by: Lunar eclipse of July 5, 2020

=== Triad ===
- Preceded by: Lunar eclipse of September 24, 1904

=== Lunar eclipses of 1988–1991 ===
This eclipse is a member of a semester series. An eclipse in a semester series of lunar eclipses repeats approximately every 177 days and 4 hours (a semester) at alternating nodes of the Moon's orbit.

The lunar eclipses on June 27, 1991 (penumbral) and December 21, 1991 (partial) occur in the next lunar year eclipse set.

Lunar eclipse series sets from 1988 to 1991
Descending node				Ascending node			
Saros	Date Viewing	Type Chart	Gamma	Saros	Date Viewing	Type Chart	Gamma
113	1988 Mar 03	Penumbral	0.9886	118	1988 Aug 27	Partial	−0.8682
123	1989 Feb 20	Total	0.2935	128	1989 Aug 17	Total	−0.1491
133	1990 Feb 09	Total	−0.4148	138	1990 Aug 06	Partial	0.6374
143	1991 Jan 30	Penumbral	−1.0752	148	1991 Jul 26	Penumbral	1.4370

=== Saros 148 ===
This eclipse is a part of Saros series 148, repeating every 18 years, 11 days, and containing 70 events. The series started with a penumbral lunar eclipse on July 15, 1973. It contains partial eclipses from October 10, 2117 through May 5, 2460; total eclipses from May 17, 2478 through September 14, 2676; and a second set of partial eclipses from September 25, 2694 through May 25, 3091. The series ends at member 70 as a penumbral eclipse on August 9, 3217.

The longest duration of totality will be produced by member 37 at 104 minutes, 29 seconds on July 10, 2568. All eclipses in this series occur at the Moon’s ascending node of orbit.

Greatest	First			
The greatest eclipse of the series will occur on 2568 Jul 10, lasting 104 minutes, 29 seconds.	Penumbral	Partial	Total	Central
The greatest eclipse of the series will occur on 2568 Jul 10, lasting 104 minutes, 29 seconds.	1973 Jul 15	2117 Oct 10	2478 May 25	2514 Jun 08
The greatest eclipse of the series will occur on 2568 Jul 10, lasting 104 minutes, 29 seconds.	Last			
The greatest eclipse of the series will occur on 2568 Jul 10, lasting 104 minutes, 29 seconds.	Central	Total	Partial	Penumbral
The greatest eclipse of the series will occur on 2568 Jul 10, lasting 104 minutes, 29 seconds.	2622 Aug 13	2676 Sep 14	3091 May 25	3217 Aug 09

Eclipses are tabulated in three columns; every third eclipse in the same column is one exeligmos apart, so they all cast shadows over approximately the same parts of the Earth.

Series members 1–13 occur between 1973 and 2200:
1	2	3
1973 Jul 15	1991 Jul 26	2009 Aug 06
4	5	6
2027 Aug 17	2045 Aug 27	2063 Sep 07
7	8	9
2081 Sep 18	2099 Sep 29	2117 Oct 10
10	11	12
2135 Oct 22	2153 Nov 01	2171 Nov 12
13
2189 Nov 22

=== Tritos series ===
This eclipse is a part of a tritos cycle, repeating at alternating nodes every 135 synodic months (≈ 3986.63 days, or 11 years minus 1 month). Their appearance and longitude are irregular due to a lack of synchronization with the anomalistic month (period of perigee), but groupings of 3 tritos cycles (≈ 33 years minus 3 months) come close (≈ 434.044 anomalistic months), so eclipses are similar in these groupings.

Series members between 1801 and 2078
1806 Jan 05 (Saros 131)	1816 Dec 04 (Saros 132)	1827 Nov 03 (Saros 133)	1838 Oct 03 (Saros 134)	1849 Sep 02 (Saros 135)
1860 Aug 01 (Saros 136)	1871 Jul 02 (Saros 137)	1882 Jun 01 (Saros 138)	1893 Apr 30 (Saros 139)	1904 Mar 31 (Saros 140)
1915 Mar 01 (Saros 141)	1926 Jan 28 (Saros 142)	1936 Dec 28 (Saros 143)	1947 Nov 28 (Saros 144)	1958 Oct 27 (Saros 145)
1969 Sep 25 (Saros 146)	1980 Aug 26 (Saros 147)	1991 Jul 26 (Saros 148)	2002 Jun 24 (Saros 149)	2013 May 25 (Saros 150)
2078 Nov 19 (Saros 156)

=== Inex series ===
This eclipse is a part of the long period inex cycle, repeating at alternating nodes, every 358 synodic months (≈ 10,571.95 days, or 29 years minus 20 days). Their appearance and longitude are irregular due to a lack of synchronization with the anomalistic month (period of perigee). However, groupings of 3 inex cycles (≈ 87 years minus 2 months) comes close (≈ 1,151.02 anomalistic months), so eclipses are similar in these groupings.

Series members between 1801 and 2200
1817 Nov 23 (Saros 142)	1846 Nov 03 (Saros 143)	1875 Oct 14 (Saros 144)
1904 Sep 24 (Saros 145)	1933 Sep 04 (Saros 146)	1962 Aug 15 (Saros 147)
1991 Jul 26 (Saros 148)	2020 Jul 05 (Saros 149)	2049 Jun 15 (Saros 150)
	2107 May 07 (Saros 152)	2136 Apr 16 (Saros 153)
	2194 Mar 07 (Saros 155)	

=== Half-Saros cycle ===
A lunar eclipse will be preceded and followed by solar eclipses by 9 years and 5.5 days (a half saros). This lunar eclipse is related to two partial solar eclipses of Solar Saros 155.

July 20, 1982	July 31, 2000

== See also ==
- List of lunar eclipses
- List of 20th-century lunar eclipses
