= July 2020 lunar eclipse =

Penumbral lunar eclipse of 5 July 2020

- Penumbral eclipse
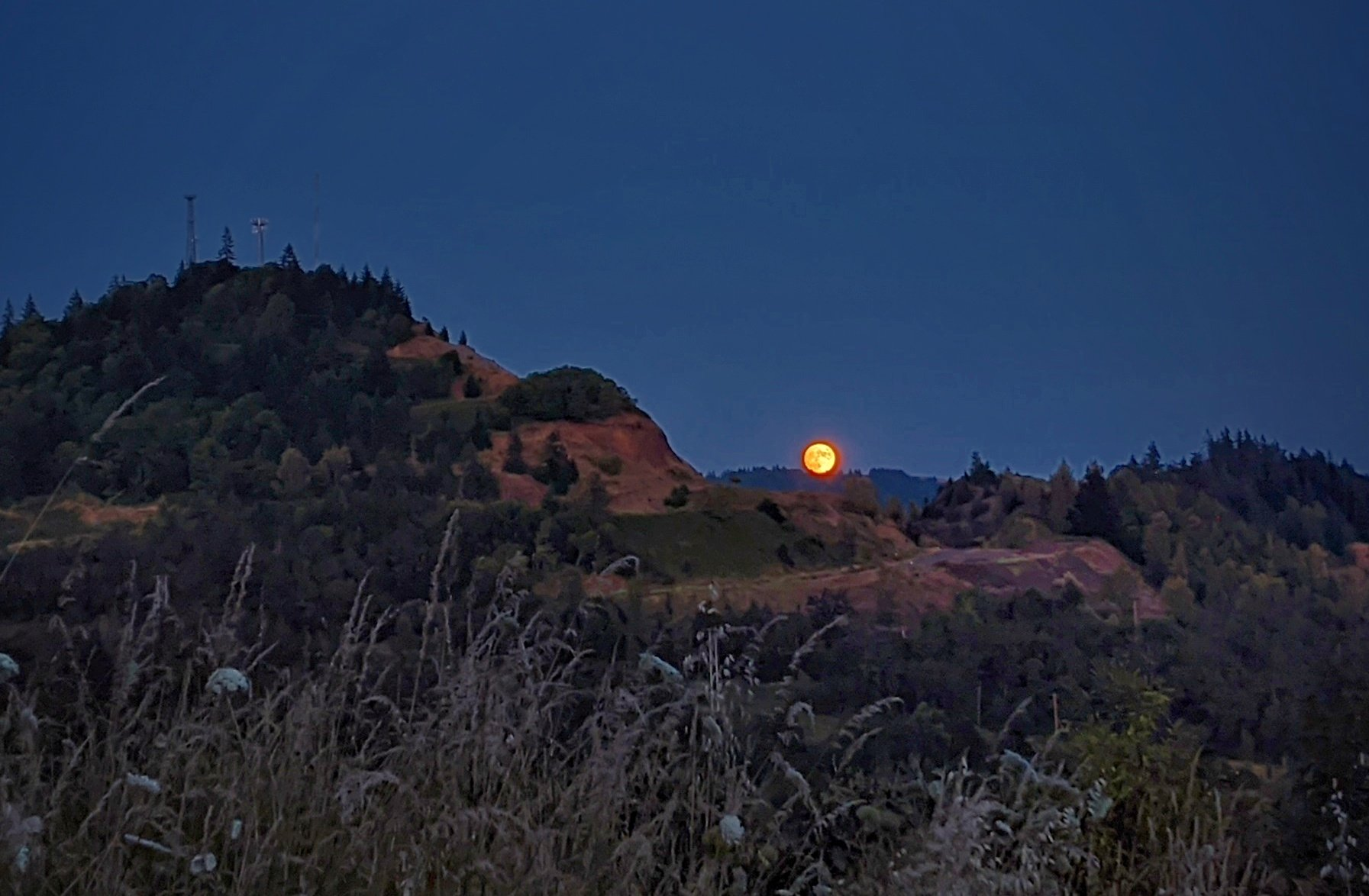
- During moonrise in Springfield, OR at 4:22 UTC
- Date: July 5, 2020
- Gamma: −1.3639
- Magnitude: −0.6422
- Saros cycle: 149 (3 of 72)
- Penumbral: 165 minutes, 0 seconds
Contacts (UTC)
- P1: 3:07:23
- Greatest: 4:30:00
- P4: 5:52:23

A penumbral lunar eclipse occurred at the Moon’s descending node of orbit on Sunday, July 5, 2020, with an umbral magnitude of −0.6422. A lunar eclipse occurs when the Moon moves into the Earth's shadow, causing the Moon to be darkened. A penumbral lunar eclipse occurs when part or all of the Moon's near side passes into the Earth's penumbra. Unlike a solar eclipse, which can only be viewed from a relatively small area of the world, a lunar eclipse may be viewed from anywhere on the night side of Earth. The Moon's apparent diameter was near the average diameter because it occurred 5.3 days after perigee (on June 29, 2020, at 22:10 UTC) and 7.5 days before apogee (on July 12, 2020, at 15:30 UTC).

This eclipse was the third of four penumbral lunar eclipses in 2020, with the others occurring on January 10, June 5, and November 30.

== Visibility ==
The eclipse was completely visible over North and South America and west Africa, seen rising over northwestern North America and the central Pacific Ocean and setting over much of Africa and western Europe.

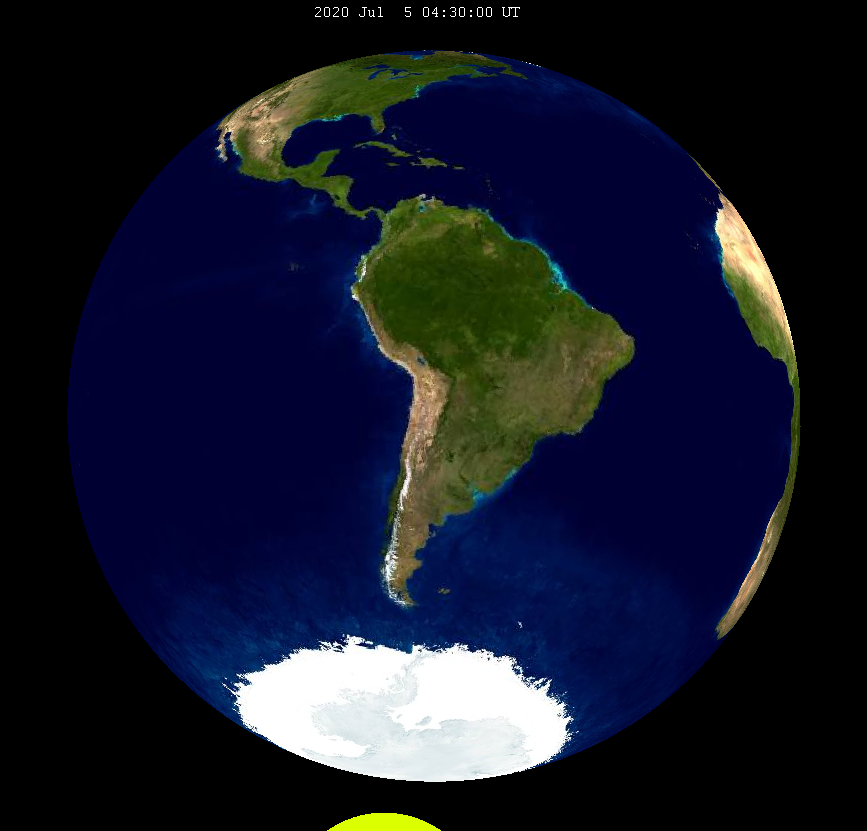
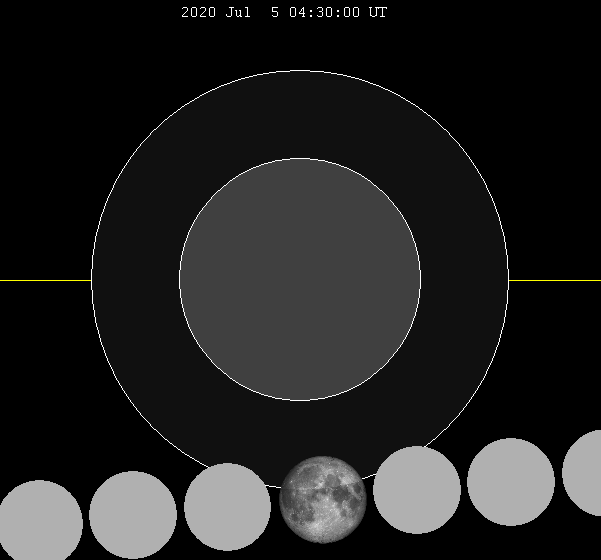
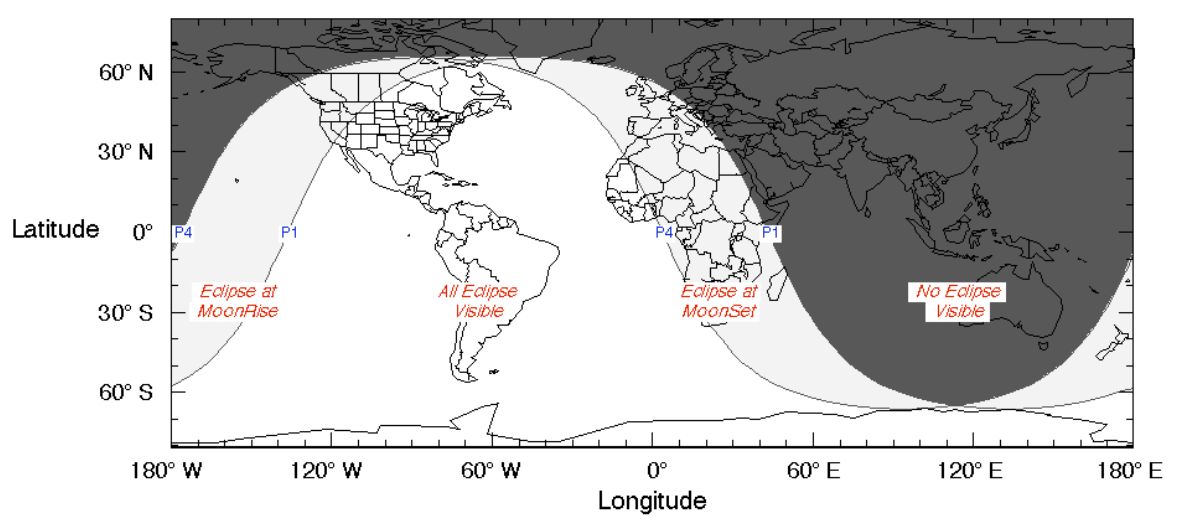
Visibility map

== Gallery ==
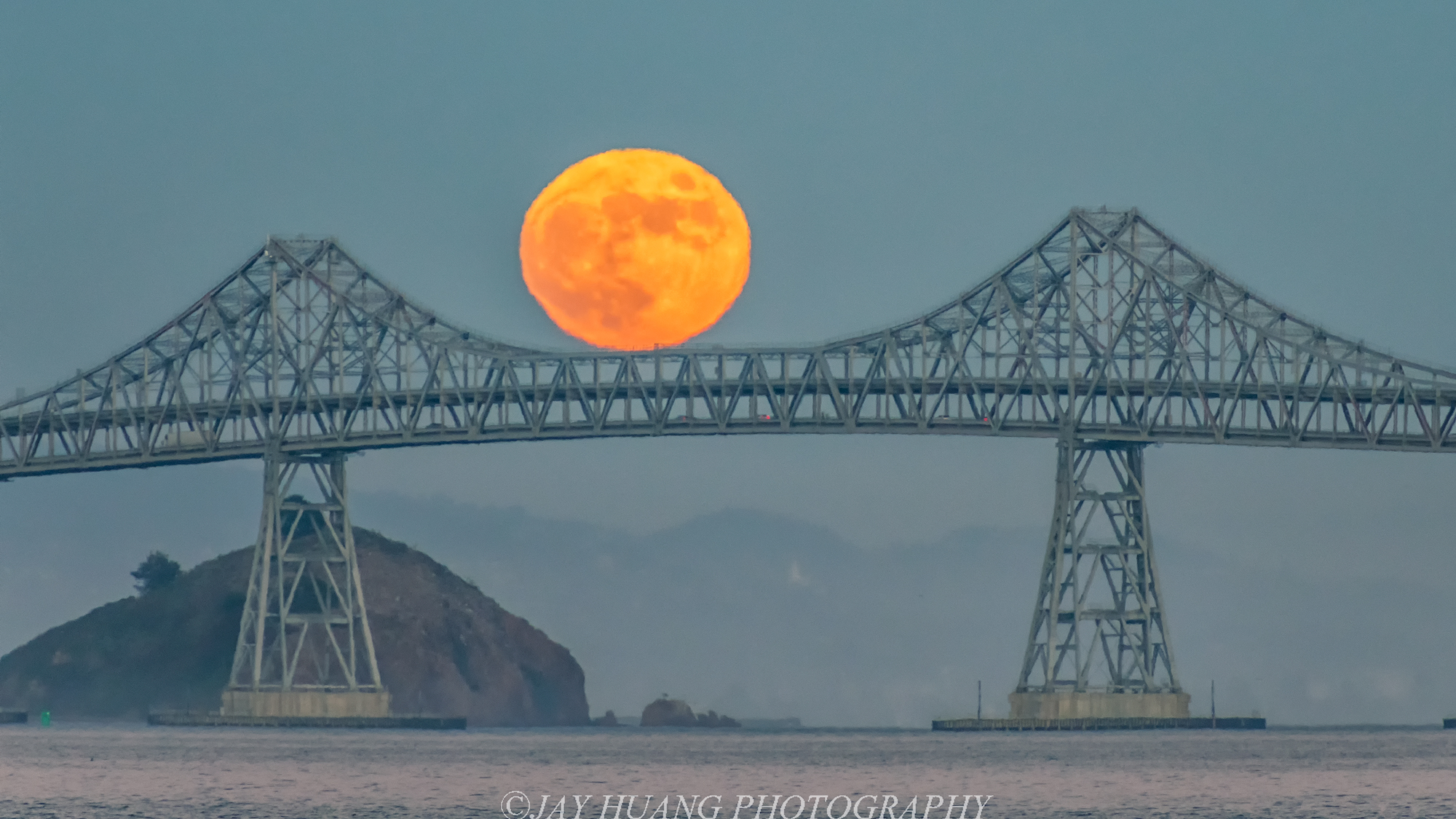
Near Richmond–San Rafael Bridge, California, 3:43 UTC

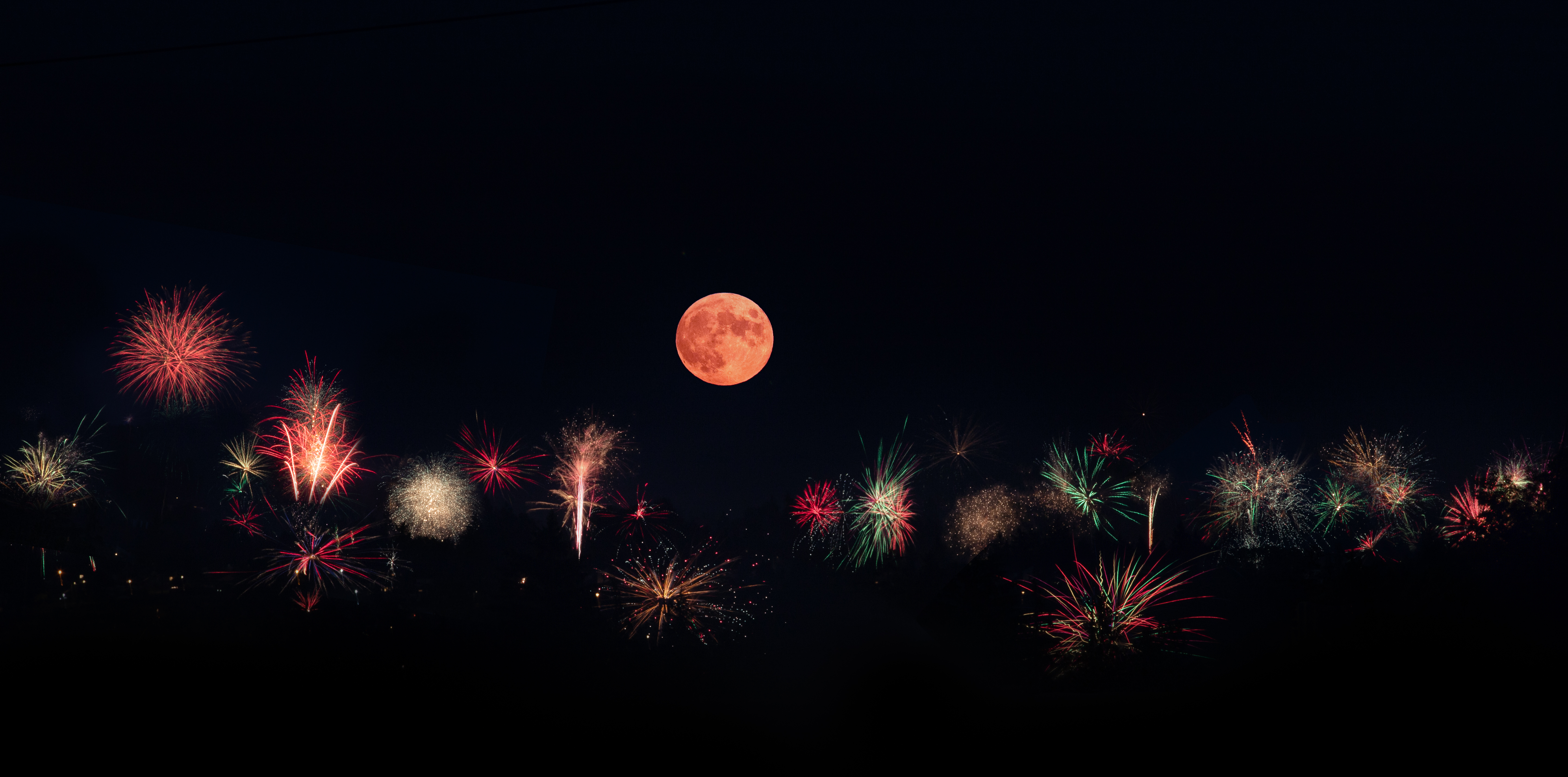
Everett, Washington, 5:12 UTC

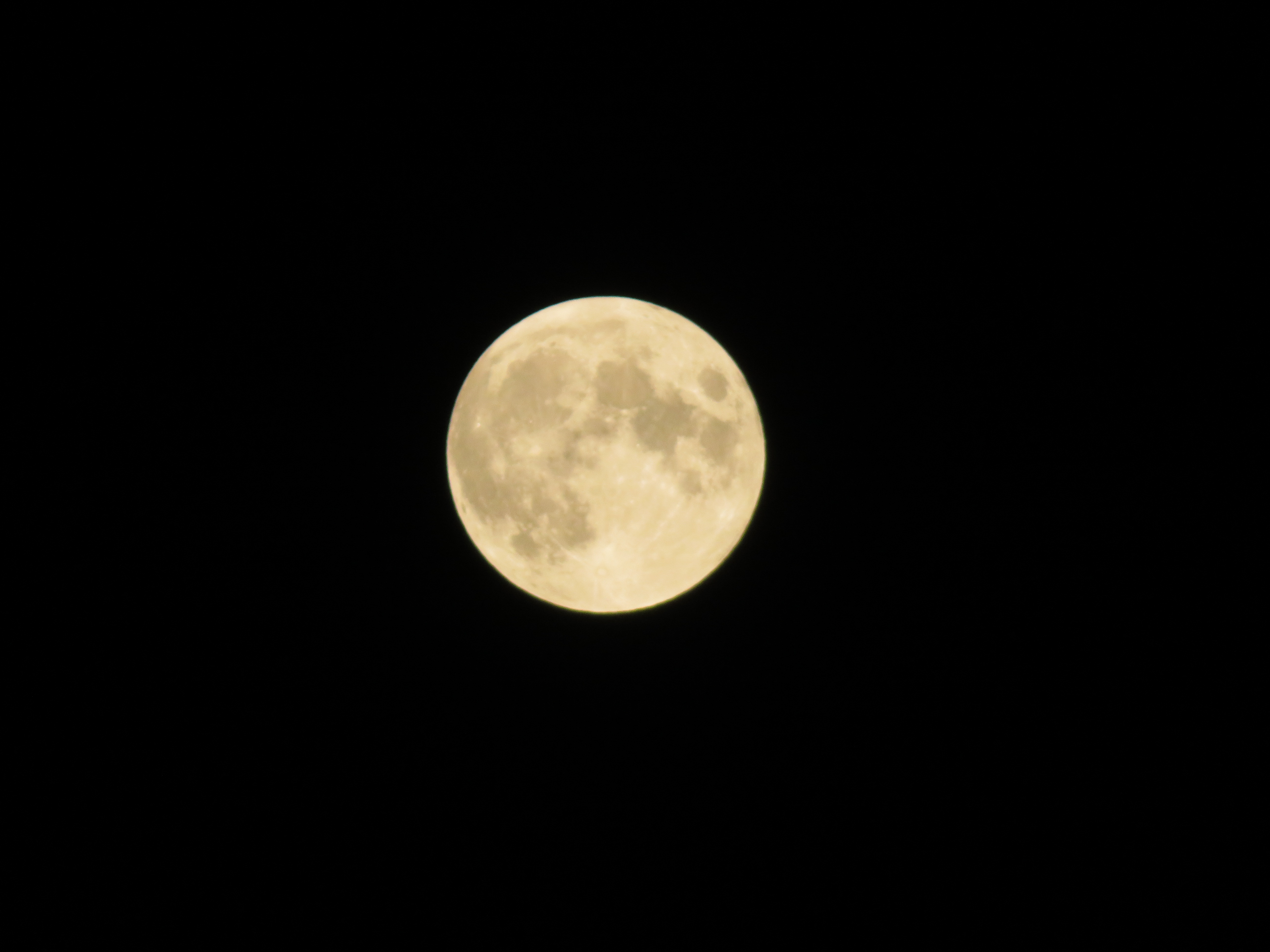
Moscow, Idaho, 5:38 UTC

Video from Burjassot, Spain

== Eclipse details ==
Shown below is a table displaying details about this particular solar eclipse. It describes various parameters pertaining to this eclipse.

July 5, 2020 Lunar Eclipse Parameters
Parameter	Value
Penumbral Magnitude	0.35600
Umbral Magnitude	−0.64219
Gamma	−1.36387
Sun Right Ascension	06h59m10.5s
Sun Declination	+22°44'23.3"
Sun Semi-Diameter	15'43.9"
Sun Equatorial Horizontal Parallax	08.6"
Moon Right Ascension	18h59m12.6s
Moon Declination	-24°03'16.2"
Moon Semi-Diameter	15'45.6"
Moon Equatorial Horizontal Parallax	0°57'50.4"
ΔT	69.7 s

== Eclipse season ==
This eclipse is part of an eclipse season, a period, roughly every six months, when eclipses occur. Only two (or occasionally three) eclipse seasons occur each year, and each season lasts about 35 days and repeats just short of six months (173 days) later; thus two full eclipse seasons always occur each year. Either two or three eclipses happen each eclipse season. In the sequence below, each eclipse is separated by a fortnight. The first and last eclipse in this sequence is separated by one synodic month.

Eclipse season of June–July 2020
June 5 Descending node (full moon)	June 21 Ascending node (new moon)	July 5 Descending node (full moon)
Penumbral lunar eclipse Lunar Saros 111	Annular solar eclipse Solar Saros 137	Penumbral lunar eclipse Lunar Saros 149

== Related eclipses ==
=== Eclipses in 2020 ===
- A penumbral lunar eclipse on January 10.
- A penumbral lunar eclipse on June 5.
- An annular solar eclipse on June 21.
- A penumbral lunar eclipse on July 5.
- A penumbral lunar eclipse on November 30.
- A total solar eclipse on December 14.

=== Metonic ===
- Preceded by: Lunar eclipse of September 16, 2016

=== Tzolkinex ===
- Preceded by: Lunar eclipse of May 25, 2013
- Followed by: Lunar eclipse of August 17, 2027

=== Half-Saros ===
- Preceded by: Solar eclipse of July 1, 2011
- Followed by: Solar eclipse of July 11, 2029

=== Tritos ===
- Preceded by: Lunar eclipse of August 6, 2009
- Followed by: Lunar eclipse of June 5, 2031

=== Lunar Saros 149 ===
- Preceded by: Lunar eclipse of June 24, 2002
- Followed by: Lunar eclipse of July 16, 2038

=== Inex ===
- Preceded by: Lunar eclipse of July 26, 1991
- Followed by: Lunar eclipse of June 15, 2049

=== Triad ===
- Preceded by: Lunar eclipse of September 4, 1933
- Followed by: Lunar eclipse of May 7, 2107

=== Lunar eclipses of 2016–2020 ===
This eclipse is a member of a semester series. An eclipse in a semester series of lunar eclipses repeats approximately every 177 days and 4 hours (a semester) at alternating nodes of the Moon's orbit.

The penumbral lunar eclipses on March 23, 2016 and September 16, 2016 occur in the previous lunar year eclipse set, and the penumbral lunar eclipses on June 5, 2020 and November 30, 2020 occur in the next lunar year eclipse set.

Lunar eclipse series sets from 2016 to 2020
Descending node				Ascending node			
Saros	Date Viewing	Type Chart	Gamma	Saros	Date Viewing	Type Chart	Gamma
109	2016 Aug 18	Penumbral	1.5641	114	2017 Feb 11	Penumbral	−1.0255
119	2017 Aug 07	Partial	0.8669	124	2018 Jan 31	Total	−0.3014
129	2018 Jul 27	Total	0.1168	134	2019 Jan 21	Total	0.3684
139	2019 Jul 16	Partial	−0.6430	144	2020 Jan 10	Penumbral	1.0727
149	2020 Jul 05	Penumbral	−1.3639				

=== Saros 149 ===
This eclipse is a part of Saros series 149, repeating every 18 years, 11 days, and containing 71 events. The series started with a penumbral lunar eclipse on June 13, 1984. It contains partial eclipses from August 29, 2110 through April 5, 2471; total eclipses from April 16, 2489 through September 17, 2741; and a second set of partial eclipses from September 28, 2759 through May 5, 3120. The series ends at member 71 as a penumbral eclipse on July 20, 3246.

The longest duration of totality will be produced by member 36 at 99 minutes, 18 seconds on July 3, 2615. All eclipses in this series occur at the Moon’s descending node of orbit.

Greatest	First			
The greatest eclipse of the series will occur on 2615 Jul 03, lasting 99 minutes, 18 seconds.	Penumbral	Partial	Total	Central
The greatest eclipse of the series will occur on 2615 Jul 03, lasting 99 minutes, 18 seconds.	1984 Jun 13	2110 Aug 29	2489 Apr 16	2561 May 30
The greatest eclipse of the series will occur on 2615 Jul 03, lasting 99 minutes, 18 seconds.	Last			
The greatest eclipse of the series will occur on 2615 Jul 03, lasting 99 minutes, 18 seconds.	Central	Total	Partial	Penumbral
The greatest eclipse of the series will occur on 2615 Jul 03, lasting 99 minutes, 18 seconds.	2687 Aug 15	2741 Sep 17	3120 May 05	3246 Jul 20

Eclipses are tabulated in three columns; every third eclipse in the same column is one exeligmos apart, so they all cast shadows over approximately the same parts of the Earth.

Series members 1–13 occur between 1984 and 2200:
1	2	3
1984 Jun 13	2002 Jun 24	2020 Jul 05
4	5	6
2038 Jul 16	2056 Jul 26	2074 Aug 07
7	8	9
2092 Aug 17	2110 Aug 29	2128 Sep 09
10	11	12
2146 Sep 20	2164 Sep 30	2182 Oct 11
13
2200 Oct 23

=== Tritos series ===
This eclipse is a part of a tritos cycle, repeating at alternating nodes every 135 synodic months (≈ 3986.63 days, or 11 years minus 1 month). Their appearance and longitude are irregular due to a lack of synchronization with the anomalistic month (period of perigee), but groupings of 3 tritos cycles (≈ 33 years minus 3 months) come close (≈ 434.044 anomalistic months), so eclipses are similar in these groupings.

Series members between 1801 and 2096
1802 Mar 19 (Saros 129)	1813 Feb 15 (Saros 130)	1824 Jan 16 (Saros 131)	1834 Dec 16 (Saros 132)	1845 Nov 14 (Saros 133)
1856 Oct 13 (Saros 134)	1867 Sep 14 (Saros 135)	1878 Aug 13 (Saros 136)	1889 Jul 12 (Saros 137)	1900 Jun 13 (Saros 138)
1911 May 13 (Saros 139)	1922 Apr 11 (Saros 140)	1933 Mar 12 (Saros 141)	1944 Feb 09 (Saros 142)	1955 Jan 08 (Saros 143)
1965 Dec 08 (Saros 144)	1976 Nov 06 (Saros 145)	1987 Oct 07 (Saros 146)	1998 Sep 06 (Saros 147)	2009 Aug 06 (Saros 148)
2020 Jul 05 (Saros 149)	2031 Jun 05 (Saros 150)			
		2096 Nov 29 (Saros 156)		

=== Inex series ===
This eclipse is a part of the long period inex cycle, repeating at alternating nodes, every 358 synodic months (≈ 10,571.95 days, or 29 years minus 20 days). Their appearance and longitude are irregular due to a lack of synchronization with the anomalistic month (period of perigee). However, groupings of 3 inex cycles (≈ 87 years minus 2 months) comes close (≈ 1,151.02 anomalistic months), so eclipses are similar in these groupings.

Series members between 1801 and 2200
1817 Nov 23 (Saros 142)	1846 Nov 03 (Saros 143)	1875 Oct 14 (Saros 144)
1904 Sep 24 (Saros 145)	1933 Sep 04 (Saros 146)	1962 Aug 15 (Saros 147)
1991 Jul 26 (Saros 148)	2020 Jul 05 (Saros 149)	2049 Jun 15 (Saros 150)
	2107 May 07 (Saros 152)	2136 Apr 16 (Saros 153)
	2194 Mar 07 (Saros 155)	

=== Half-Saros cycle ===
A lunar eclipse will be preceded and followed by solar eclipses by 9 years and 5.5 days (a half saros). This lunar eclipse is related to two partial solar eclipses of Solar Saros 156.

July 1, 2011	July 11, 2029

== See also ==
- List of lunar eclipses and List of 21st-century lunar eclipses
