= July 1973 lunar eclipse =

Penumbral lunar eclipse

- Penumbral eclipse
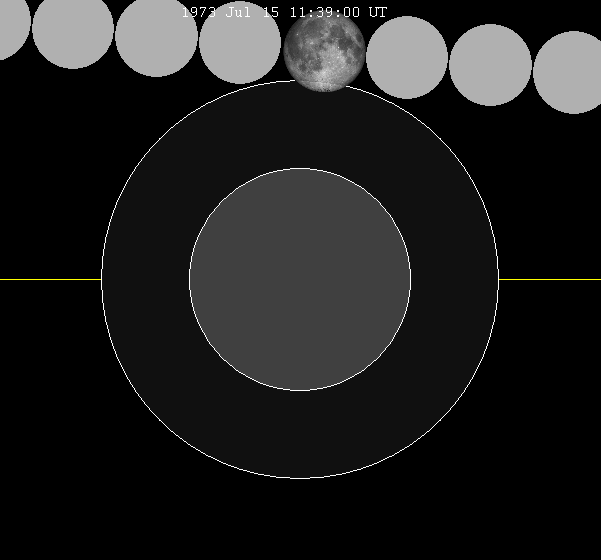
- The Moon's hourly motion shown right to left
- Date: July 15, 1973
- Gamma: 1.5178
- Magnitude: −0.9581
- Saros cycle: 148 (1 of 71)
- Penumbral: 99 minutes, 5 seconds
Contacts (UTC)
- P1: 10:49:07
- Greatest: 11:38:35
- P4: 12:28:12

A penumbral lunar eclipse occurred at the Moon’s ascending node of orbit on Sunday, July 15, 1973, with an umbral magnitude of −0.9581. A lunar eclipse occurs when the Moon moves into the Earth's shadow, causing the Moon to be darkened. A penumbral lunar eclipse occurs when part or all of the Moon's near side passes into the Earth's penumbra. Unlike a solar eclipse, which can only be viewed from a relatively small area of the world, a lunar eclipse may be viewed from anywhere on the night side of Earth. Occurring about 3 days after apogee (on July 12, 1973, at 22:45 UTC), the Moon's apparent diameter was smaller.

This eclipse was the third of four lunar eclipses in 1973, with the others occurring on January 18 (penumbral), June 15 (penumbral), and December 10 (partial).

This was the first lunar eclipse of Saros series 148.

== Visibility ==
The eclipse was completely visible over Australia, western North America, and Antarctica, seen rising over east Asia and setting over central North America and western South America.

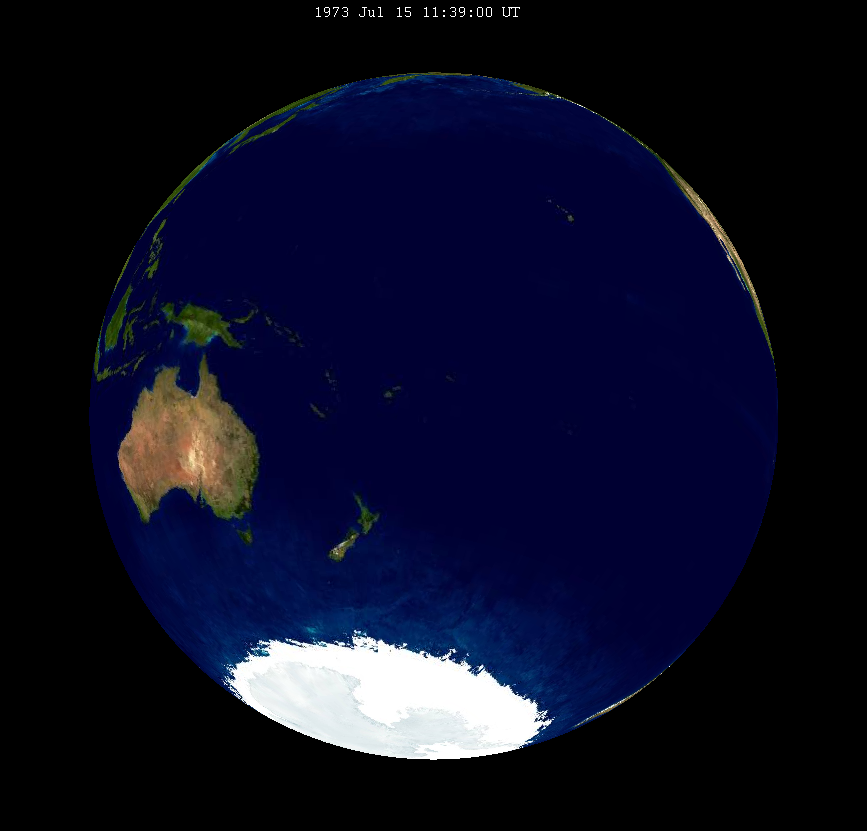
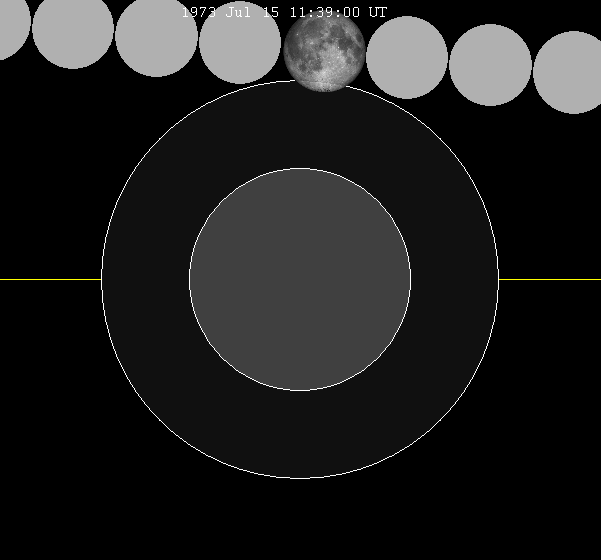

== Eclipse details ==
Shown below is a table displaying details about this particular solar eclipse. It describes various parameters pertaining to this eclipse.

July 15, 1973 Lunar Eclipse Parameters
| Parameter | Value |
|---|---|
| Penumbral Magnitude | 0.10468 |
| Umbral Magnitude | −0.95805 |
| Gamma | 1.51782 |
| Sun Right Ascension | 07h38m36.3s |
| Sun Declination | +21°30'35.7" |
| Sun Semi-Diameter | 15'44.1" |
| Sun Equatorial Horizontal Parallax | 08.7" |
| Moon Right Ascension | 19h37m04.9s |
| Moon Declination | -20°10'55.9" |
| Moon Semi-Diameter | 14'48.4" |
| Moon Equatorial Horizontal Parallax | 0°54'20.5" |
| ΔT | 43.9 s |

== Eclipse season ==
This eclipse is part of an eclipse season, a period, roughly every six months, when eclipses occur. Only two (or occasionally three) eclipse seasons occur each year, and each season lasts about 35 days and repeats just short of six months (173 days) later; thus two full eclipse seasons always occur each year. Either two or three eclipses happen each eclipse season. In the sequence below, each eclipse is separated by a fortnight. The first and last eclipse in this sequence is separated by one synodic month.

Eclipse season of June–July 1973
| June 15 Ascending node (full moon) | June 30 Descending node (new moon) | July 15 Ascending node (full moon) |
|---|---|---|
| Penumbral lunar eclipse Lunar Saros 110 | Total solar eclipse Solar Saros 136 | Penumbral lunar eclipse Lunar Saros 148 |

== Related eclipses ==
=== Eclipses in 1973 ===
- An annular solar eclipse on January 4.
- A penumbral lunar eclipse on January 18.
- A penumbral lunar eclipse on June 15.
- A total solar eclipse on June 30.
- A penumbral lunar eclipse on July 15.
- A partial lunar eclipse on December 10.
- An annular solar eclipse on December 24.

=== Metonic ===
- Preceded by: Lunar eclipse of September 25, 1969

=== Tzolkinex ===
- Followed by: Lunar eclipse of August 26, 1980

=== Half-Saros ===
- Preceded by: Solar eclipse of July 9, 1964
- Followed by: Solar eclipse of July 20, 1982

=== Tritos ===
- Preceded by: Lunar eclipse of August 15, 1962
- Followed by: Lunar eclipse of June 13, 1984

=== Lunar Saros 148 ===
- Followed by: Lunar eclipse of July 26, 1991

=== Inex ===
- Preceded by: Lunar eclipse of August 4, 1944
- Followed by: Lunar eclipse of June 24, 2002

=== Triad ===
- Preceded by: Lunar eclipse of September 13, 1886

=== Lunar eclipses of 1969–1973 ===
This eclipse is a member of a semester series. An eclipse in a semester series of lunar eclipses repeats approximately every 177 days and 4 hours (a semester) at alternating nodes of the Moon's orbit.

The penumbral lunar eclipses on April 2, 1969 and September 25, 1969 occur in the previous lunar year eclipse set, and the lunar eclipses on June 15, 1973 (penumbral) and December 10, 1973 (partial) occur in the next lunar year eclipse set.

Lunar eclipse series sets from 1969 to 1973
| Ascending node | | | | Descending node | | | |
| Saros | Date Viewing | Type Chart | Gamma | Saros | Date Viewing | Type Chart | Gamma |
| 108 | 1969 Aug 27 | Penumbral | −1.5407 | 113 | 1970 Feb 21 | Partial | 0.9620 |
| 118 | 1970 Aug 17 | Partial | −0.8053 | 123 | 1971 Feb 10 | Total | 0.2741 |
| 128 | 1971 Aug 06 | Total | −0.0794 | 133 | 1972 Jan 30 | Total | −0.4273 |
| 138 | 1972 Jul 26 | Partial | 0.7117 | 143 | 1973 Jan 18 | Penumbral | −1.0845 |
| 148 | 1973 Jul 15 | Penumbral | 1.5178 | | | | |

=== Saros 148 ===
This eclipse is a part of Saros series 148, repeating every 18 years, 11 days, and containing 70 events. The series started with a penumbral lunar eclipse on July 15, 1973. It contains partial eclipses from October 10, 2117 through May 5, 2460; total eclipses from May 17, 2478 through September 14, 2676; and a second set of partial eclipses from September 25, 2694 through May 25, 3091. The series ends at member 70 as a penumbral eclipse on August 9, 3217.

The longest duration of totality will be produced by member 37 at 104 minutes, 29 seconds on July 10, 2568. All eclipses in this series occur at the Moon’s ascending node of orbit.

| Greatest | First | | | |
|---|---|---|---|---|
| The greatest eclipse of the series will occur on 2568 Jul 10, lasting 104 minutes, 29 seconds. | Penumbral | Partial | Total | Central |
| The greatest eclipse of the series will occur on 2568 Jul 10, lasting 104 minutes, 29 seconds. | 1973 Jul 15 | 2117 Oct 10 | 2478 May 25 | 2514 Jun 08 |
| The greatest eclipse of the series will occur on 2568 Jul 10, lasting 104 minutes, 29 seconds. | Last | | | |
| The greatest eclipse of the series will occur on 2568 Jul 10, lasting 104 minutes, 29 seconds. | Central | Total | Partial | Penumbral |
| The greatest eclipse of the series will occur on 2568 Jul 10, lasting 104 minutes, 29 seconds. | 2622 Aug 13 | 2676 Sep 14 | 3091 May 25 | 3217 Aug 09 |

Eclipses are tabulated in three columns; every third eclipse in the same column is one exeligmos apart, so they all cast shadows over approximately the same parts of the Earth.

Series members 1–13 occur between 1973 and 2200:
| 1 | 2 | 3 |
|---|---|---|
| 1973 Jul 15 | 1991 Jul 26 | 2009 Aug 06 |
| 4 | 5 | 6 |
| 2027 Aug 17 | 2045 Aug 27 | 2063 Sep 07 |
| 7 | 8 | 9 |
| 2081 Sep 18 | 2099 Sep 29 | 2117 Oct 10 |
| 10 | 11 | 12 |
| 2135 Oct 22 | 2153 Nov 01 | 2171 Nov 12 |
13
2189 Nov 22

=== Tritos series ===
This eclipse is a part of a tritos cycle, repeating at alternating nodes every 135 synodic months (≈ 3986.63 days, or 11 years minus 1 month). Their appearance and longitude are irregular due to a lack of synchronization with the anomalistic month (period of perigee), but groupings of 3 tritos cycles (≈ 33 years minus 3 months) come close (≈ 434.044 anomalistic months), so eclipses are similar in these groupings.

Series members between 1801 and 2060
| 1809 Oct 23 (Saros 133) | 1820 Sep 22 (Saros 134) | 1831 Aug 23 (Saros 135) | 1842 Jul 22 (Saros 136) | 1853 Jun 21 (Saros 137) |
| 1864 May 21 (Saros 138) | 1875 Apr 20 (Saros 139) | 1886 Mar 20 (Saros 140) | 1897 Feb 17 (Saros 141) | 1908 Jan 18 (Saros 142) |
| 1918 Dec 17 (Saros 143) | 1929 Nov 17 (Saros 144) | 1940 Oct 16 (Saros 145) | 1951 Sep 15 (Saros 146) | 1962 Aug 15 (Saros 147) |
| 1973 Jul 15 (Saros 148) | 1984 Jun 13 (Saros 149) | | | |
| | | | 2060 Nov 08 (Saros 156) | |

=== Inex series ===
This eclipse is a part of the long period inex cycle, repeating at alternating nodes, every 358 synodic months (≈ 10,571.95 days, or 29 years minus 20 days). Their appearance and longitude are irregular due to a lack of synchronization with the anomalistic month (period of perigee). However, groupings of 3 inex cycles (≈ 87 years minus 2 months) comes close (≈ 1,151.02 anomalistic months), so eclipses are similar in these groupings.

Series members between 1801 and 2031
| 1828 Oct 23 (Saros 143) | 1857 Oct 03 (Saros 144) | 1886 Sep 13 (Saros 145) |
| 1915 Aug 24 (Saros 146) | 1944 Aug 04 (Saros 147) | 1973 Jul 15 (Saros 148) |
| 2002 Jun 24 (Saros 149) | 2031 Jun 05 (Saros 150) | |

=== Half-Saros cycle ===
A lunar eclipse will be preceded and followed by solar eclipses by 9 years and 5.5 days (a half saros). This lunar eclipse is related to two partial solar eclipses of Solar Saros 155.

| July 9, 1964 | July 20, 1982 |

== See also ==
- List of lunar eclipses
- List of 20th-century lunar eclipses
