= July 2038 lunar eclipse =

Penumbral

- Penumbral eclipse
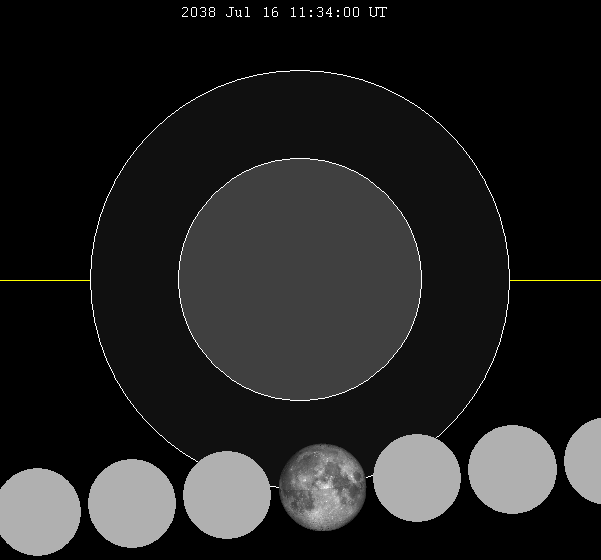
- The Moon's hourly motion shown right to left
- Date: July 16, 2038
- Gamma: −1.2837
- Magnitude: −0.4938
- Saros cycle: 149 (4 of 72)
- Penumbral: 192 minutes, 27 seconds
Contacts (UTC)
- P1: 9:58:13
- Greatest: 11:35:56
- P4: 13:10:40

A penumbral lunar eclipse will occur at the Moon’s descending node of orbit on Friday, July 16, 2038, with an umbral magnitude of −0.4938. A lunar eclipse occurs when the Moon moves into the Earth's shadow, causing the Moon to be darkened. A penumbral lunar eclipse occurs when part or all of the Moon's near side passes into the Earth's penumbra. Unlike a solar eclipse, which can only be viewed from a relatively small area of the world, a lunar eclipse may be viewed from anywhere on the night side of Earth. Occurring about 4.9 days before perigee (on July 11, 2038, at 15:35 UTC), the Moon's apparent diameter will be larger.

This eclipse will be the third of four penumbral lunar eclipses in 2038, with the others occurring on January 21, June 17, and December 11.

== Visibility ==
The eclipse will be completely visible over Australia, Antarctica, and the Pacific Ocean, seen rising over east Asia and setting over North and South America.

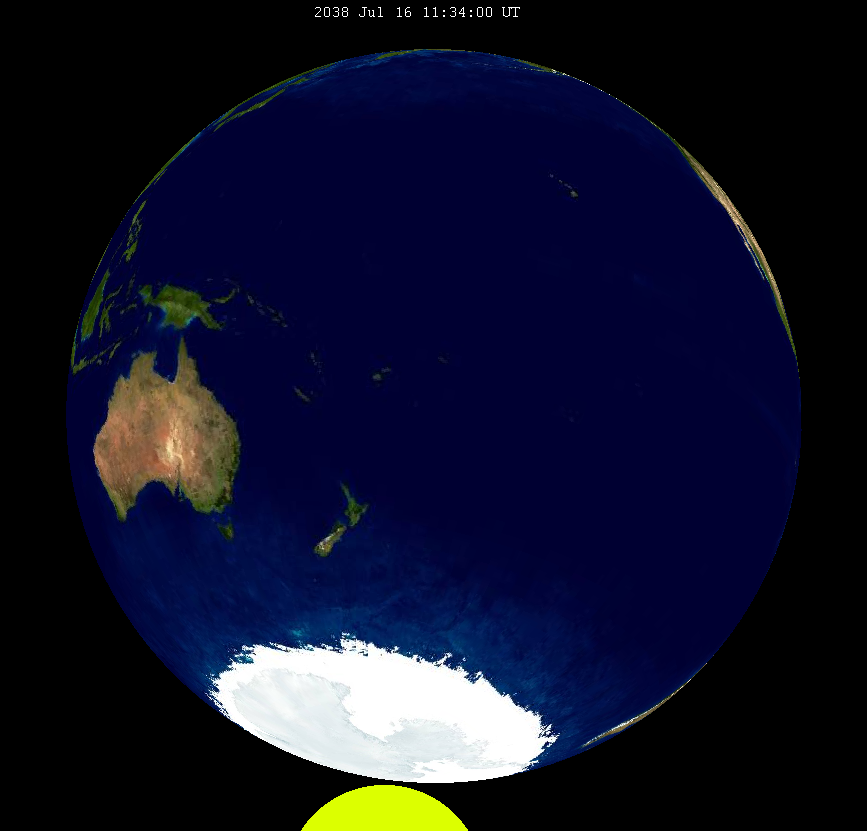
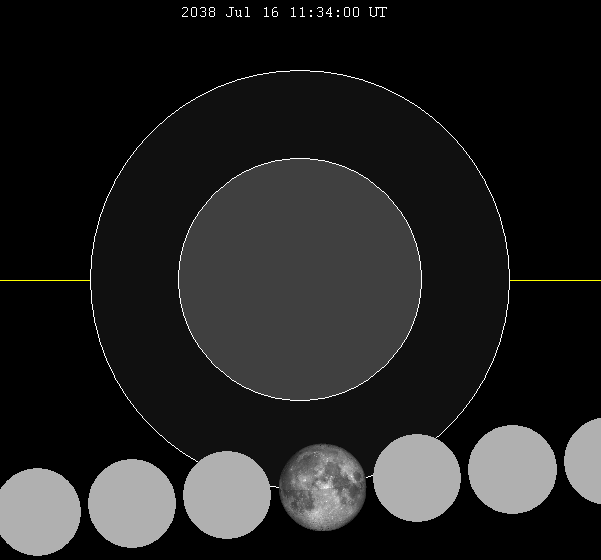

== Eclipse details ==
Shown below is a table displaying details about this particular lunar eclipse. It describes various parameters pertaining to this eclipse.

July 16, 2038 Lunar Eclipse Parameters
Parameter	Value
Penumbral Magnitude	0.50125
Umbral Magnitude	−0.49383
Gamma	−1.28381
Sun Right Ascension	07h43m47.7s
Sun Declination	+21°17'34.6"
Sun Semi-Diameter	15'44.2"
Sun Equatorial Horizontal Parallax	08.7"
Moon Right Ascension	19h44m13.1s
Moon Declination	-22°31'51.1"
Moon Semi-Diameter	15'48.9"
Moon Equatorial Horizontal Parallax	0°58'02.4"
ΔT	78.3 s

== Eclipse season ==
This eclipse is part of an eclipse season, a period, roughly every six months, when eclipses occur. Only two (or occasionally three) eclipse seasons occur each year, and each season lasts about 35 days and repeats just short of six months (173 days) later; thus two full eclipse seasons always occur each year. Either two or three eclipses happen each eclipse season. In the sequence below, each eclipse is separated by a fortnight. The first and last eclipse in this sequence is separated by one synodic month.

Eclipse season of June–July 2038
June 17 Descending node (full moon)	July 2 Ascending node (new moon)	July 16 Descending node (full moon)
Penumbral lunar eclipse Lunar Saros 111	Annular solar eclipse Solar Saros 137	Penumbral lunar eclipse Lunar Saros 149

== Related eclipses ==
=== Eclipses in 2038 ===
- An annular solar eclipse on January 5.
- A penumbral lunar eclipse on January 21.
- A penumbral lunar eclipse on June 17.
- An annular solar eclipse on July 2.
- A penumbral lunar eclipse on July 16.
- A penumbral lunar eclipse on December 11.
- A total solar eclipse on December 26.

=== Metonic ===
- Preceded by: Lunar eclipse of September 28, 2034

=== Tzolkinex ===
- Preceded by: Lunar eclipse of June 5, 2031
- Followed by: Lunar eclipse of August 27, 2045

=== Half-Saros ===
- Preceded by: Solar eclipse of July 11, 2029
- Followed by: Solar eclipse of July 22, 2047

=== Tritos ===
- Preceded by: Lunar eclipse of August 17, 2027
- Followed by: Lunar eclipse of June 15, 2049

=== Lunar Saros 149 ===
- Preceded by: Lunar eclipse of July 5, 2020
- Followed by: Lunar eclipse of July 26, 2056

=== Inex ===
- Preceded by: Lunar eclipse of August 6, 2009
- Followed by: Lunar eclipse of June 27, 2067

=== Triad ===
- Preceded by: Lunar eclipse of September 15, 1951
- Followed by: Lunar eclipse of May 17, 2125

=== Lunar eclipses of 2035–2038 ===
This eclipse is a member of a semester series. An eclipse in a semester series of lunar eclipses repeats approximately every 177 days and 4 hours (a semester) at alternating nodes of the Moon's orbit.

The penumbral lunar eclipses on June 17, 2038 and December 11, 2038 occur in the next lunar year eclipse set.

Lunar eclipse series sets from 2035 to 2038
Ascending node				Descending node			
Saros	Date Viewing	Type Chart	Gamma	Saros	Date Viewing	Type Chart	Gamma
114	2035 Feb 22	Penumbral	−1.0357	119	2035 Aug 19	Partial	0.9433
124	2036 Feb 11	Total	−0.3110	129	2036 Aug 07	Total	0.2004
134	2037 Jan 31	Total	0.3619	139	2037 Jul 27	Partial	−0.5582
144	2038 Jan 21	Penumbral	1.0710	149	2038 Jul 16	Penumbral	−1.2837

=== Saros 149 ===
This eclipse is a part of Saros series 149, repeating every 18 years, 11 days, and containing 71 events. The series started with a penumbral lunar eclipse on June 13, 1984. It contains partial eclipses from August 29, 2110 through April 5, 2471; total eclipses from April 16, 2489 through September 17, 2741; and a second set of partial eclipses from September 28, 2759 through May 5, 3120. The series ends at member 71 as a penumbral eclipse on July 20, 3246.

The longest duration of totality will be produced by member 36 at 99 minutes, 18 seconds on July 3, 2615. All eclipses in this series occur at the Moon’s descending node of orbit.

Greatest	First			
The greatest eclipse of the series will occur on 2615 Jul 03, lasting 99 minutes, 18 seconds.	Penumbral	Partial	Total	Central
The greatest eclipse of the series will occur on 2615 Jul 03, lasting 99 minutes, 18 seconds.	1984 Jun 13	2110 Aug 29	2489 Apr 16	2561 May 30
The greatest eclipse of the series will occur on 2615 Jul 03, lasting 99 minutes, 18 seconds.	Last			
The greatest eclipse of the series will occur on 2615 Jul 03, lasting 99 minutes, 18 seconds.	Central	Total	Partial	Penumbral
The greatest eclipse of the series will occur on 2615 Jul 03, lasting 99 minutes, 18 seconds.	2687 Aug 15	2741 Sep 17	3120 May 05	3246 Jul 20

Eclipses are tabulated in three columns; every third eclipse in the same column is one exeligmos apart, so they all cast shadows over approximately the same parts of the Earth.

Series members 1–13 occur between 1984 and 2200:
1	2	3
1984 Jun 13	2002 Jun 24	2020 Jul 05
4	5	6
2038 Jul 16	2056 Jul 26	2074 Aug 07
7	8	9
2092 Aug 17	2110 Aug 29	2128 Sep 09
10	11	12
2146 Sep 20	2164 Sep 30	2182 Oct 11
13
2200 Oct 23

=== Tritos series ===
This eclipse is a part of a tritos cycle, repeating at alternating nodes every 135 synodic months (≈ 3986.63 days, or 11 years minus 1 month). Their appearance and longitude are irregular due to a lack of synchronization with the anomalistic month (period of perigee), but groupings of 3 tritos cycles (≈ 33 years minus 3 months) come close (≈ 434.044 anomalistic months), so eclipses are similar in these groupings.

Series members between 1801 and 2147
1809 Apr 30 (Saros 128)	1820 Mar 29 (Saros 129)	1831 Feb 26 (Saros 130)	1842 Jan 26 (Saros 131)	1852 Dec 26 (Saros 132)
1863 Nov 25 (Saros 133)	1874 Oct 25 (Saros 134)	1885 Sep 24 (Saros 135)	1896 Aug 23 (Saros 136)	1907 Jul 25 (Saros 137)
1918 Jun 24 (Saros 138)	1929 May 23 (Saros 139)	1940 Apr 22 (Saros 140)	1951 Mar 23 (Saros 141)	1962 Feb 19 (Saros 142)
1973 Jan 18 (Saros 143)	1983 Dec 20 (Saros 144)	1994 Nov 18 (Saros 145)	2005 Oct 17 (Saros 146)	2016 Sep 16 (Saros 147)
2027 Aug 17 (Saros 148)	2038 Jul 16 (Saros 149)	2049 Jun 15 (Saros 150)		
			2114 Dec 12 (Saros 156)	
	2147 Sep 09 (Saros 159)			

=== Inex series ===
This eclipse is a part of the long period inex cycle, repeating at alternating nodes, every 358 synodic months (≈ 10,571.95 days, or 29 years minus 20 days). Their appearance and longitude are irregular due to a lack of synchronization with the anomalistic month (period of perigee). However, groupings of 3 inex cycles (≈ 87 years minus 2 months) comes close (≈ 1,151.02 anomalistic months), so eclipses are similar in these groupings.

Series members between 1801 and 2154
1806 Dec 25 (Saros 141)	1835 Dec 05 (Saros 142)	1864 Nov 13 (Saros 143)
1893 Oct 25 (Saros 144)	1922 Oct 06 (Saros 145)	1951 Sep 15 (Saros 146)
1980 Aug 26 (Saros 147)	2009 Aug 06 (Saros 148)	2038 Jul 16 (Saros 149)
2067 Jun 27 (Saros 150)	2096 Jun 06 (Saros 151)	2125 May 17 (Saros 152)
2154 Apr 28 (Saros 153)

=== Half-Saros cycle ===
A lunar eclipse will be preceded and followed by solar eclipses by 9 years and 5.5 days (a half saros). This lunar eclipse is related to two total solar eclipses of Solar Saros 156.

July 11, 2029	July 22, 2047

== See also ==
- List of lunar eclipses and List of 21st-century lunar eclipses
