= June 2002 lunar eclipse =

Penumbral lunar eclipse 24 June 2002

- Penumbral eclipse
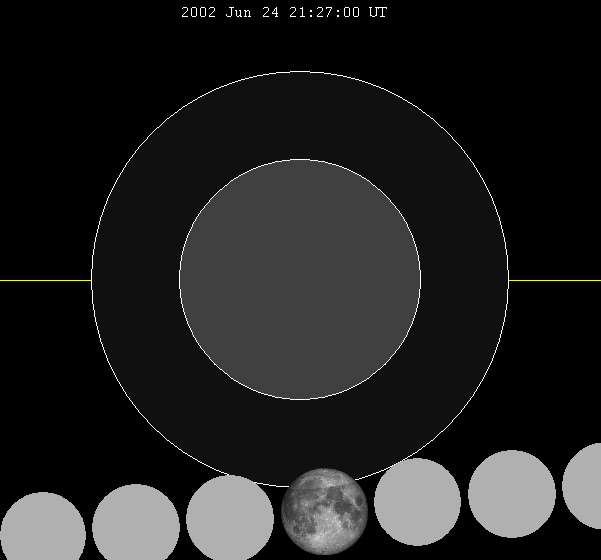
- Hourly motion shown right to left
- Date: June 24, 2002
- Gamma: −1.4439
- Magnitude: −0.791
- Saros cycle: 149 (2 of 72)
- Penumbral: 129 minutes, 5 seconds
Contacts (UTC)
- P1: 20:22:28
- Greatest: 21:27:09
- P4: 22:31:33

A penumbral lunar eclipse occurred at the Moon’s descending node of orbit on Monday, June 24, 2002, with an umbral magnitude of −0.791. A lunar eclipse occurs when the Moon moves into the Earth's shadow, causing the Moon to be darkened. A penumbral lunar eclipse occurs when part or all of the Moon's near side passes into the Earth's penumbra. Unlike a solar eclipse, which can only be viewed from a relatively small area of the world, a lunar eclipse may be viewed from anywhere on the night side of Earth. Occurring about 6.7 days after perigee (on June 19, 2002, at 3:30 UTC), the Moon's apparent diameter was larger.

== Visibility ==
The eclipse was completely visible over Africa, Europe, west and central Asia, and Antarctica, seen rising over much of South America and setting over much of east Asia and Australia.

The moon's hourly motion across the Earth's shadow in the constellation of Scorpius.

== Eclipse details ==
Shown below is a table displaying details about this particular lunar eclipse. It describes various parameters pertaining to this eclipse.

June 24, 2002 Lunar Eclipse Parameters
Parameter	Value
Penumbral Magnitude	0.21095
Umbral Magnitude	−0.79099
Gamma	−1.44399
Sun Right Ascension	06h13m52.0s
Sun Declination	+23°24'03.8"
Sun Semi-Diameter	15'44.2"
Sun Equatorial Horizontal Parallax	08.7"
Moon Right Ascension	18h13m25.9s
Moon Declination	-24°47'04.8"
Moon Semi-Diameter	15'42.3"
Moon Equatorial Horizontal Parallax	0°57'38.4"
ΔT	64.3 s

== Eclipse season ==
This eclipse is part of an eclipse season, a period, roughly every six months, when eclipses occur. Only two (or occasionally three) eclipse seasons occur each year, and each season lasts about 35 days and repeats just short of six months (173 days) later; thus two full eclipse seasons always occur each year. Either two or three eclipses happen each eclipse season. In the sequence below, each eclipse is separated by a fortnight. The first and last eclipse in this sequence is separated by one synodic month.

Eclipse season of May–June 2002
May 26 Descending node (full moon)	June 10 Ascending node (new moon)	June 24 Descending node (full moon)
Penumbral lunar eclipse Lunar Saros 111	Annular solar eclipse Solar Saros 137	Penumbral lunar eclipse Lunar Saros 149

== Related eclipses ==
=== Eclipses in 2002 ===
- A penumbral lunar eclipse on May 26.
- An annular solar eclipse on June 10.
- A penumbral lunar eclipse on June 24.
- A penumbral lunar eclipse on November 20.
- A total solar eclipse on December 4.

=== Metonic ===
- Preceded by: Lunar eclipse of September 6, 1998

=== Tzolkinex ===
- Followed by: Lunar eclipse of August 6, 2009

=== Half-Saros ===
- Followed by: Solar eclipse of July 1, 2011

=== Tritos ===
- Preceded by: Lunar eclipse of July 26, 1991
- Followed by: Lunar eclipse of May 25, 2013

=== Lunar Saros 149 ===
- Preceded by: Lunar eclipse of June 13, 1984
- Followed by: Lunar eclipse of July 5, 2020

=== Inex ===
- Preceded by: Lunar eclipse of July 15, 1973
- Followed by: Lunar eclipse of June 5, 2031

=== Triad ===
- Preceded by: Lunar eclipse of August 24, 1915

=== Lunar eclipses of 1998–2002 ===
This eclipse is a member of a semester series. An eclipse in a semester series of lunar eclipses repeats approximately every 177 days and 4 hours (a semester) at alternating nodes of the Moon's orbit.

The penumbral lunar eclipses on March 13, 1998 and September 6, 1998 occur in the previous lunar year eclipse set, and the penumbral lunar eclipses on May 26, 2002 and November 20, 2002 occur in the next lunar year eclipse set.

Lunar eclipse series sets from 1998 to 2002
Descending node				Ascending node			
Saros	Date Viewing	Type Chart	Gamma	Saros	Date Viewing	Type Chart	Gamma
109	1998 Aug 08	Penumbral	1.4876	114	1999 Jan 31	Penumbral	−1.0190
119	1999 Jul 28	Partial	0.7863	124	2000 Jan 21	Total	−0.2957
129	2000 Jul 16	Total	0.0302	134	2001 Jan 09	Total	0.3720
139	2001 Jul 05	Partial	−0.7287	144	2001 Dec 30	Penumbral	1.0732
149	2002 Jun 24	Penumbral	−1.4440				

=== Saros 149 ===
This eclipse is a part of Saros series 149, repeating every 18 years, 11 days, and containing 71 events. The series started with a penumbral lunar eclipse on June 13, 1984. It contains partial eclipses from August 29, 2110 through April 5, 2471; total eclipses from April 16, 2489 through September 17, 2741; and a second set of partial eclipses from September 28, 2759 through May 5, 3120. The series ends at member 71 as a penumbral eclipse on July 20, 3246.

The longest duration of totality will be produced by member 36 at 99 minutes, 18 seconds on July 3, 2615. All eclipses in this series occur at the Moon’s descending node of orbit.

Greatest	First			
The greatest eclipse of the series will occur on 2615 Jul 03, lasting 99 minutes, 18 seconds.	Penumbral	Partial	Total	Central
The greatest eclipse of the series will occur on 2615 Jul 03, lasting 99 minutes, 18 seconds.	1984 Jun 13	2110 Aug 29	2489 Apr 16	2561 May 30
The greatest eclipse of the series will occur on 2615 Jul 03, lasting 99 minutes, 18 seconds.	Last			
The greatest eclipse of the series will occur on 2615 Jul 03, lasting 99 minutes, 18 seconds.	Central	Total	Partial	Penumbral
The greatest eclipse of the series will occur on 2615 Jul 03, lasting 99 minutes, 18 seconds.	2687 Aug 15	2741 Sep 17	3120 May 05	3246 Jul 20

Eclipses are tabulated in three columns; every third eclipse in the same column is one exeligmos apart, so they all cast shadows over approximately the same parts of the Earth.

Series members 1–13 occur between 1984 and 2200:
1	2	3
1984 Jun 13	2002 Jun 24	2020 Jul 05
4	5	6
2038 Jul 16	2056 Jul 26	2074 Aug 07
7	8	9
2092 Aug 17	2110 Aug 29	2128 Sep 09
10	11	12
2146 Sep 20	2164 Sep 30	2182 Oct 11
13
2200 Oct 23

=== Tritos series ===
This eclipse is a part of a tritos cycle, repeating at alternating nodes every 135 synodic months (≈ 3986.63 days, or 11 years minus 1 month). Their appearance and longitude are irregular due to a lack of synchronization with the anomalistic month (period of perigee), but groupings of 3 tritos cycles (≈ 33 years minus 3 months) come close (≈ 434.044 anomalistic months), so eclipses are similar in these groupings.

Series members between 1801 and 2078
1806 Jan 05 (Saros 131)	1816 Dec 04 (Saros 132)	1827 Nov 03 (Saros 133)	1838 Oct 03 (Saros 134)	1849 Sep 02 (Saros 135)
1860 Aug 01 (Saros 136)	1871 Jul 02 (Saros 137)	1882 Jun 01 (Saros 138)	1893 Apr 30 (Saros 139)	1904 Mar 31 (Saros 140)
1915 Mar 01 (Saros 141)	1926 Jan 28 (Saros 142)	1936 Dec 28 (Saros 143)	1947 Nov 28 (Saros 144)	1958 Oct 27 (Saros 145)
1969 Sep 25 (Saros 146)	1980 Aug 26 (Saros 147)	1991 Jul 26 (Saros 148)	2002 Jun 24 (Saros 149)	2013 May 25 (Saros 150)
2078 Nov 19 (Saros 156)

=== Inex series ===
This eclipse is a part of the long period inex cycle, repeating at alternating nodes, every 358 synodic months (≈ 10,571.95 days, or 29 years minus 20 days). Their appearance and longitude are irregular due to a lack of synchronization with the anomalistic month (period of perigee). However, groupings of 3 inex cycles (≈ 87 years minus 2 months) comes close (≈ 1,151.02 anomalistic months), so eclipses are similar in these groupings.

Series members between 1801 and 2031
1828 Oct 23 (Saros 143)	1857 Oct 03 (Saros 144)	1886 Sep 13 (Saros 145)
1915 Aug 24 (Saros 146)	1944 Aug 04 (Saros 147)	1973 Jul 15 (Saros 148)
2002 Jun 24 (Saros 149)	2031 Jun 05 (Saros 150)	

=== Half-Saros cycle ===
A lunar eclipse will be preceded and followed by solar eclipses by 9 years and 5.5 days (a half saros). This lunar eclipse is related to one partial solar eclipse of Solar Saros 156.

July 1, 2011

== See also ==
- List of lunar eclipses
- List of 21st-century lunar eclipses
