= October 2005 lunar eclipse =

Partial lunar eclipse 17 October 2005

- Partial eclipse
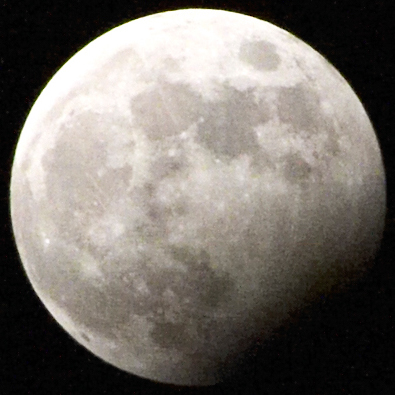
- Partiality as viewed from Taipei, Taiwan, 12:04 UTC
- Date: October 17, 2005
- Gamma: 0.9796
- Magnitude: 0.0645
- Saros cycle: 146 (10 of 72)
- Partiality: 55 minutes, 58 seconds
- Penumbral: 259 minutes, 49 seconds
Contacts (UTC)
- P1: 9:53:27
- U1: 11:35:18
- Greatest: 12:03:22
- U4: 12:31:16
- P4: 14:13:16

A partial lunar eclipse occurred at the Moon’s ascending node of orbit on Monday, October 17, 2005, with an umbral magnitude of 0.0645. A lunar eclipse occurs when the Moon moves into the Earth's shadow, causing the Moon to be darkened. A partial lunar eclipse occurs when one part of the Moon is in the Earth's umbra, while the other part is in the Earth's penumbra. Unlike a solar eclipse, which can only be viewed from a relatively small area of the world, a lunar eclipse may be viewed from anywhere on the night side of Earth. Occurring about 3.1 days before perigee (on October 14, 2005, at 10:00 UTC), the Moon's apparent diameter was larger.

== Visibility ==
The eclipse was completely visible much of Australia, east Asia, and western North America, seen rising over much of Asia and setting over much of North America and western South America.

Hourly motion shown right to left	The Moon's hourly motion across the Earth's shadow in the constellation of Pisces.
Visibility map

== Images ==
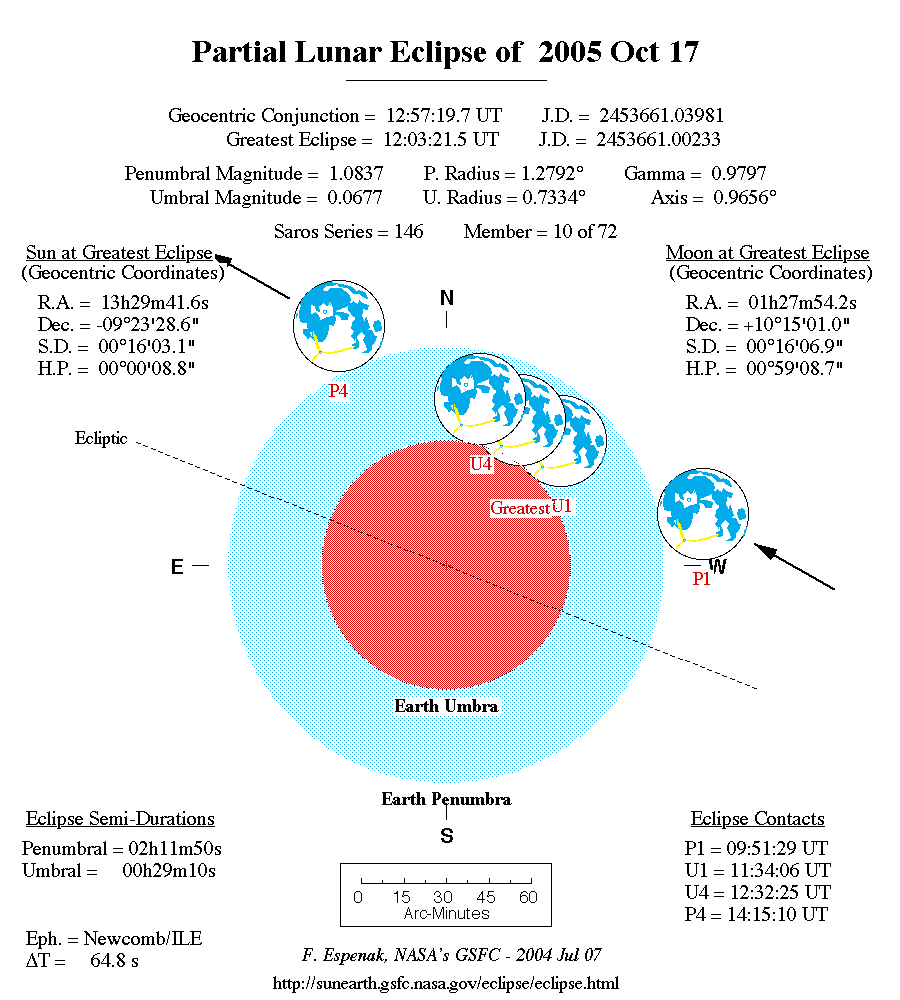
NASA chart of the eclipse

== Gallery ==
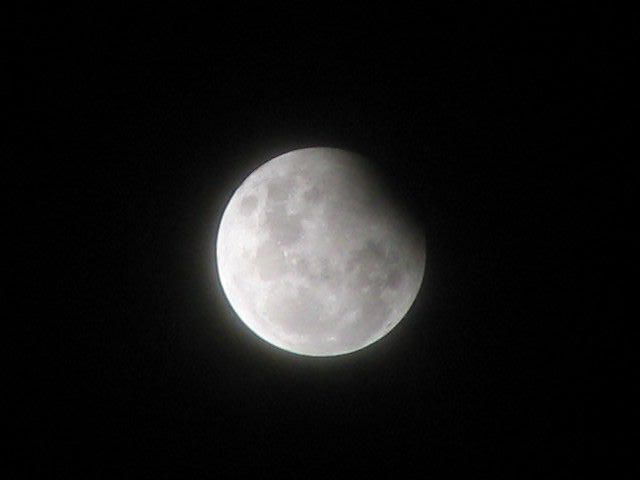
Akita City, Japan, 12:21 UTC

== Eclipse details ==
Shown below is a table displaying details about this particular lunar eclipse. It describes various parameters pertaining to this eclipse.

October 17, 2005 Lunar Eclipse Parameters
Parameter	Value
Penumbral Magnitude	1.06046
Umbral Magnitude	0.06446
Gamma	0.97960
Sun Right Ascension	13h29m41.7s
Sun Declination	-09°23'29.0"
Sun Semi-Diameter	16'03.1"
Sun Equatorial Horizontal Parallax	08.8"
Moon Right Ascension	01h27m54.2s
Moon Declination	+10°15'01.0"
Moon Semi-Diameter	16'06.9"
Moon Equatorial Horizontal Parallax	0°59'08.7"
ΔT	64.8 s

== Eclipse season ==
This eclipse is part of an eclipse season, a period, roughly every six months, when eclipses occur. Only two (or occasionally three) eclipse seasons occur each year, and each season lasts about 35 days and repeats just short of six months (173 days) later; thus two full eclipse seasons always occur each year. Either two or three eclipses happen each eclipse season. In the sequence below, each eclipse is separated by a fortnight.

Eclipse season of October 2005
October 3 Descending node (new moon)	October 17 Ascending node (full moon)
Annular solar eclipse Solar Saros 134	Partial lunar eclipse Lunar Saros 146

== Related eclipses ==
=== Eclipses in 2005 ===
- A hybrid solar eclipse on April 8.
- A penumbral lunar eclipse on April 24.
- An annular solar eclipse on October 3.
- A partial lunar eclipse on October 17.

=== Metonic ===
- Preceded by: Lunar eclipse of December 30, 2001
- Followed by: Lunar eclipse of August 6, 2009

=== Tzolkinex ===
- Preceded by: Lunar eclipse of September 6, 1998
- Followed by: Lunar eclipse of November 28, 2012

=== Half-Saros ===
- Preceded by: Solar eclipse of October 12, 1996
- Followed by: Solar eclipse of October 23, 2014

=== Tritos ===
- Preceded by: Lunar eclipse of November 18, 1994
- Followed by: Lunar eclipse of September 16, 2016

=== Lunar Saros 146 ===
- Preceded by: Lunar eclipse of October 7, 1987
- Followed by: Lunar eclipse of October 28, 2023

=== Inex ===
- Preceded by: Lunar eclipse of November 6, 1976
- Followed by: Lunar eclipse of September 28, 2034

=== Triad ===
- Preceded by: Lunar eclipse of December 17, 1918
- Followed by: Lunar eclipse of August 17, 2092

=== Lunar eclipses of 2002–2005 ===
This eclipse is a member of a semester series. An eclipse in a semester series of lunar eclipses repeats approximately every 177 days and 4 hours (a semester) at alternating nodes of the Moon's orbit.

The penumbral lunar eclipse on June 24, 2002 occurs in the previous lunar year eclipse set.

Lunar eclipse series sets from 2002 to 2005
Descending node				Ascending node			
Saros	Date Viewing	Type Chart	Gamma	Saros	Date Viewing	Type Chart	Gamma
111	2002 May 26	Penumbral	1.1759	116	2002 Nov 20	Penumbral	−1.1127
121	2003 May 16	Total	0.4123	126	2003 Nov 09	Total	−0.4319
131	2004 May 04	Total	−0.3132	136	2004 Oct 28	Total	0.2846
141	2005 Apr 24	Penumbral	−1.0885	146	2005 Oct 17	Partial	0.9796

=== Metonic series ===
The Metonic cycle repeats nearly exactly every 19 years and represents a Saros cycle plus one lunar year. Because it occurs on the same calendar date, the Earth's shadow will in nearly the same location relative to the background stars.

Metonic lunar eclipse sets 1948–2005
Descending node			Ascending node		
Saros	Date	Type	Saros	Date	Type
111	1948 Apr 23	Partial	116	1948 Oct 18	Penumbral
121	1967 Apr 24	Total	126	1967 Oct 18	Total
131	1986 Apr 24	Total	136	1986 Oct 17	Total
141	2005 Apr 24	Penumbral	146	2005 Oct 17	Partial

=== Saros 146 ===
This eclipse is a part of Saros series 146, repeating every 18 years, 11 days, and containing 72 events. The series started with a penumbral lunar eclipse on July 11, 1843. It contains partial eclipses from October 17, 2005 through May 14, 2348; total eclipses from May 25, 2366 through November 16, 2654; and a second set of partial eclipses from November 27, 2672 through June 12, 2997. The series ends at member 72 as a penumbral eclipse on August 29, 3123.

The longest duration of totality will be produced by member 37 at 99 minutes, 22 seconds on August 8, 2492. All eclipses in this series occur at the Moon’s ascending node of orbit.

Greatest	First			
The greatest eclipse of the series will occur on 2492 Aug 08, lasting 99 minutes, 22 seconds.	Penumbral	Partial	Total	Central
The greatest eclipse of the series will occur on 2492 Aug 08, lasting 99 minutes, 22 seconds.	1843 Jul 11	2005 Oct 17	2366 May 25	2438 Jul 07
The greatest eclipse of the series will occur on 2492 Aug 08, lasting 99 minutes, 22 seconds.	Last			
The greatest eclipse of the series will occur on 2492 Aug 08, lasting 99 minutes, 22 seconds.	Central	Total	Partial	Penumbral
The greatest eclipse of the series will occur on 2492 Aug 08, lasting 99 minutes, 22 seconds.	2546 Sep 11	2654 Nov 16	2997 Jun 12	3123 Aug 29

Eclipses are tabulated in three columns; every third eclipse in the same column is one exeligmos apart, so they all cast shadows over approximately the same parts of the Earth.

Series members 1–20 occur between 1843 and 2200:
1	2	3
1843 Jul 11	1861 Jul 21	1879 Aug 02
4	5	6
1897 Aug 12	1915 Aug 24	1933 Sep 04
7	8	9
1951 Sep 15	1969 Sep 25	1987 Oct 07
10	11	12
2005 Oct 17	2023 Oct 28	2041 Nov 08
13	14	15
2059 Nov 19	2077 Nov 29	2095 Dec 11
16	17	18
2113 Dec 22	2132 Jan 02	2150 Jan 13
19	20	
2168 Jan 24	2186 Feb 04	

=== Tritos series ===
This eclipse is a part of a tritos cycle, repeating at alternating nodes every 135 synodic months (≈ 3986.63 days, or 11 years minus 1 month). Their appearance and longitude are irregular due to a lack of synchronization with the anomalistic month (period of perigee), but groupings of 3 tritos cycles (≈ 33 years minus 3 months) come close (≈ 434.044 anomalistic months), so eclipses are similar in these groupings.

Series members between 1801 and 2147
1809 Apr 30 (Saros 128)	1820 Mar 29 (Saros 129)	1831 Feb 26 (Saros 130)	1842 Jan 26 (Saros 131)	1852 Dec 26 (Saros 132)
1863 Nov 25 (Saros 133)	1874 Oct 25 (Saros 134)	1885 Sep 24 (Saros 135)	1896 Aug 23 (Saros 136)	1907 Jul 25 (Saros 137)
1918 Jun 24 (Saros 138)	1929 May 23 (Saros 139)	1940 Apr 22 (Saros 140)	1951 Mar 23 (Saros 141)	1962 Feb 19 (Saros 142)
1973 Jan 18 (Saros 143)	1983 Dec 20 (Saros 144)	1994 Nov 18 (Saros 145)	2005 Oct 17 (Saros 146)	2016 Sep 16 (Saros 147)
2027 Aug 17 (Saros 148)	2038 Jul 16 (Saros 149)	2049 Jun 15 (Saros 150)		
			2114 Dec 12 (Saros 156)	
	2147 Sep 09 (Saros 159)			

=== Inex series ===
This eclipse is a part of the long period inex cycle, repeating at alternating nodes, every 358 synodic months (≈ 10,571.95 days, or 29 years minus 20 days). Their appearance and longitude are irregular due to a lack of synchronization with the anomalistic month (period of perigee). However, groupings of 3 inex cycles (≈ 87 years minus 2 months) comes close (≈ 1,151.02 anomalistic months), so eclipses are similar in these groupings.

Series members between 1801 and 2200
1803 Mar 08 (Saros 139)	1832 Feb 16 (Saros 140)	1861 Jan 26 (Saros 141)
1890 Jan 06 (Saros 142)	1918 Dec 17 (Saros 143)	1947 Nov 28 (Saros 144)
1976 Nov 06 (Saros 145)	2005 Oct 17 (Saros 146)	2034 Sep 28 (Saros 147)
2063 Sep 07 (Saros 148)	2092 Aug 17 (Saros 149)	2121 Jul 30 (Saros 150)
2150 Jul 09 (Saros 151)	2179 Jun 19 (Saros 152)	

=== Half-Saros cycle ===
A lunar eclipse will be preceded and followed by solar eclipses by 9 years and 5.5 days (a half saros). This lunar eclipse is related to two partial solar eclipses of Solar Saros 153.

October 12, 1996	October 23, 2014

== See also ==
- List of lunar eclipses and List of 21st-century lunar eclipses
- May 2003 lunar eclipse
- November 2003 lunar eclipse
- May 2004 lunar eclipse
- File:Visibility Lunar Eclipse 2005-10-17.png
- File:2005-10-17 Lunar Eclipse Sketch.gif Chart
