= October 1987 lunar eclipse =

Astronomical event

- Penumbral eclipse
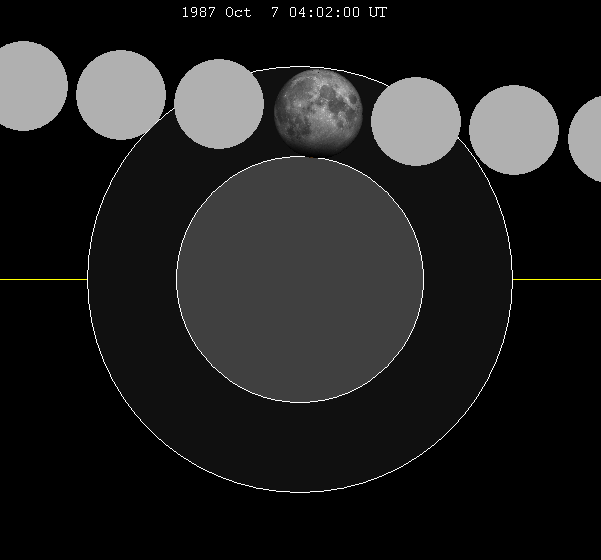
- The Moon's hourly motion shown right to left
- Date: October 7, 1987
- Gamma: 1.0189
- Magnitude: −0.0095
- Saros cycle: 146 (9 of 72)
- Penumbral: 253 minutes, 28 seconds
Contacts (UTC)
- P1: 1:54:49
- Greatest: 4:01:35
- P4: 6:08:17

A penumbral lunar eclipse occurred at the Moon’s ascending node of orbit on Wednesday, October 7, 1987, with an umbral magnitude of −0.0095. A lunar eclipse occurs when the Moon moves into the Earth's shadow, causing the Moon to be darkened. A penumbral lunar eclipse occurs when part or all of the Moon's near side passes into the Earth's penumbra. Unlike a solar eclipse, which can only be viewed from a relatively small area of the world, a lunar eclipse may be viewed from anywhere on the night side of Earth. Occurring about 3.1 days after perigee (on October 4, 1987, at 1:35 UTC), the Moon's apparent diameter was larger.

== Visibility ==
The eclipse was completely visible over much of North America, South America, west Africa, and western Europe, seen rising over northwestern North America and the central Pacific Ocean and setting over much of Africa, Europe, and west and central Asia.

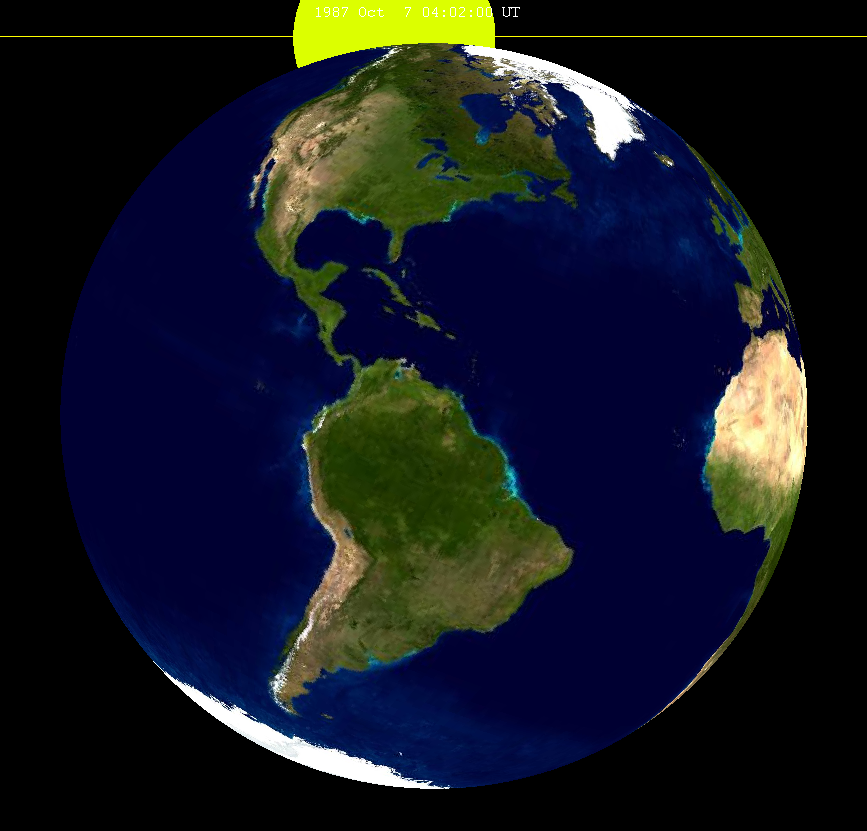
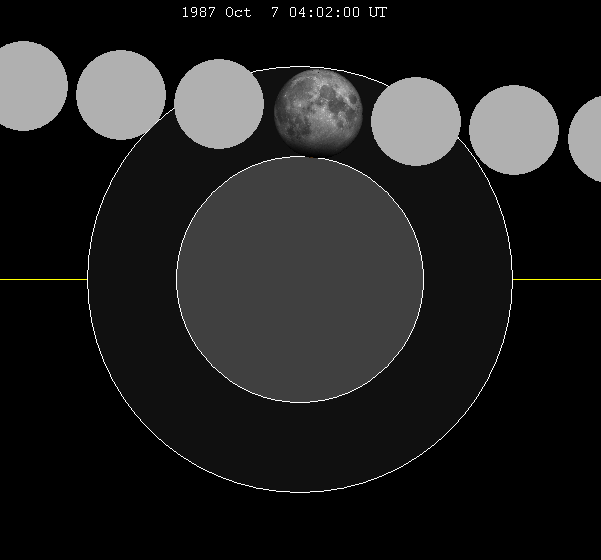

== Eclipse details ==
Shown below is a table displaying details about this particular solar eclipse. It describes various parameters pertaining to this eclipse.

October 7, 1987 Lunar Eclipse Parameters
Parameter	Value
Penumbral Magnitude	0.98640
Umbral Magnitude	−0.00949
Gamma	1.01890
Sun Right Ascension	12h49m09.5s
Sun Declination	-05°16'24.7"
Sun Semi-Diameter	16'00.1"
Sun Equatorial Horizontal Parallax	08.8"
Moon Right Ascension	00h47m14.4s
Moon Declination	+06°09'13.6"
Moon Semi-Diameter	16'04.0"
Moon Equatorial Horizontal Parallax	0°58'58.1"
ΔT	55.6 s

== Eclipse season ==
This eclipse is part of an eclipse season, a period, roughly every six months, when eclipses occur. Only two (or occasionally three) eclipse seasons occur each year, and each season lasts about 35 days and repeats just short of six months (173 days) later; thus two full eclipse seasons always occur each year. Either two or three eclipses happen each eclipse season. In the sequence below, each eclipse is separated by a fortnight.

Eclipse season of September–October 1987
September 23 Descending node (new moon)	October 7 Ascending node (full moon)
Annular solar eclipse Solar Saros 134	Penumbral lunar eclipse Lunar Saros 146

== Related eclipses ==
=== Eclipses in 1987 ===
- A hybrid solar eclipse on March 29.
- A penumbral lunar eclipse on April 14.
- An annular solar eclipse on September 23.
- A penumbral lunar eclipse on October 7.

=== Metonic ===
- Preceded by: Lunar eclipse of December 20, 1983
- Followed by: Lunar eclipse of July 26, 1991

=== Tzolkinex ===
- Preceded by: Lunar eclipse of August 26, 1980
- Followed by: Lunar eclipse of November 18, 1994

=== Half-Saros ===
- Preceded by: Solar eclipse of October 2, 1978
- Followed by: Solar eclipse of October 12, 1996

=== Tritos ===
- Preceded by: Lunar eclipse of November 6, 1976
- Followed by: Lunar eclipse of September 6, 1998

=== Lunar Saros 146 ===
- Preceded by: Lunar eclipse of September 25, 1969
- Followed by: Lunar eclipse of October 17, 2005

=== Inex ===
- Preceded by: Lunar eclipse of October 27, 1958
- Followed by: Lunar eclipse of September 16, 2016

=== Triad ===
- Preceded by: Lunar eclipse of December 6, 1900
- Followed by: Lunar eclipse of August 7, 2074

=== Lunar eclipses of 1984–1987 ===
This eclipse is a member of a semester series. An eclipse in a semester series of lunar eclipses repeats approximately every 177 days and 4 hours (a semester) at alternating nodes of the Moon's orbit.

The penumbral lunar eclipse on June 13, 1984 occurs in the previous lunar year eclipse set.

Lunar eclipse series sets from 1984 to 1987
Descending node				Ascending node			
Saros	Date Viewing	Type Chart	Gamma	Saros	Date Viewing	Type Chart	Gamma
111	1984 May 15	Penumbral	1.1131	116	1984 Nov 08	Penumbral	−1.0900
121	1985 May 04	Total	0.3520	126	1985 Oct 28	Total	−0.4022
131	1986 Apr 24	Total	−0.3683	136	1986 Oct 17	Total	0.3189
141	1987 Apr 14	Penumbral	−1.1364	146	1987 Oct 07	Penumbral	1.0189

=== Saros 146 ===
This eclipse is a part of Saros series 146, repeating every 18 years, 11 days, and containing 72 events. The series started with a penumbral lunar eclipse on July 11, 1843. It contains partial eclipses from October 17, 2005 through May 14, 2348; total eclipses from May 25, 2366 through November 16, 2654; and a second set of partial eclipses from November 27, 2672 through June 12, 2997. The series ends at member 72 as a penumbral eclipse on August 29, 3123.

The longest duration of totality will be produced by member 37 at 99 minutes, 22 seconds on August 8, 2492. All eclipses in this series occur at the Moon’s ascending node of orbit.

Greatest	First			
The greatest eclipse of the series will occur on 2492 Aug 08, lasting 99 minutes, 22 seconds.	Penumbral	Partial	Total	Central
The greatest eclipse of the series will occur on 2492 Aug 08, lasting 99 minutes, 22 seconds.	1843 Jul 11	2005 Oct 17	2366 May 25	2438 Jul 07
The greatest eclipse of the series will occur on 2492 Aug 08, lasting 99 minutes, 22 seconds.	Last			
The greatest eclipse of the series will occur on 2492 Aug 08, lasting 99 minutes, 22 seconds.	Central	Total	Partial	Penumbral
The greatest eclipse of the series will occur on 2492 Aug 08, lasting 99 minutes, 22 seconds.	2546 Sep 11	2654 Nov 16	2997 Jun 12	3123 Aug 29

Eclipses are tabulated in three columns; every third eclipse in the same column is one exeligmos apart, so they all cast shadows over approximately the same parts of the Earth.

Series members 1–20 occur between 1843 and 2200:
1	2	3
1843 Jul 11	1861 Jul 21	1879 Aug 02
4	5	6
1897 Aug 12	1915 Aug 24	1933 Sep 04
7	8	9
1951 Sep 15	1969 Sep 25	1987 Oct 07
10	11	12
2005 Oct 17	2023 Oct 28	2041 Nov 08
13	14	15
2059 Nov 19	2077 Nov 29	2095 Dec 11
16	17	18
2113 Dec 22	2132 Jan 02	2150 Jan 13
19	20	
2168 Jan 24	2186 Feb 04	

=== Tritos series ===
This eclipse is a part of a tritos cycle, repeating at alternating nodes every 135 synodic months (≈ 3986.63 days, or 11 years minus 1 month). Their appearance and longitude are irregular due to a lack of synchronization with the anomalistic month (period of perigee), but groupings of 3 tritos cycles (≈ 33 years minus 3 months) come close (≈ 434.044 anomalistic months), so eclipses are similar in these groupings.

Series members between 1801 and 2096
1802 Mar 19 (Saros 129)	1813 Feb 15 (Saros 130)	1824 Jan 16 (Saros 131)	1834 Dec 16 (Saros 132)	1845 Nov 14 (Saros 133)
1856 Oct 13 (Saros 134)	1867 Sep 14 (Saros 135)	1878 Aug 13 (Saros 136)	1889 Jul 12 (Saros 137)	1900 Jun 13 (Saros 138)
1911 May 13 (Saros 139)	1922 Apr 11 (Saros 140)	1933 Mar 12 (Saros 141)	1944 Feb 09 (Saros 142)	1955 Jan 08 (Saros 143)
1965 Dec 08 (Saros 144)	1976 Nov 06 (Saros 145)	1987 Oct 07 (Saros 146)	1998 Sep 06 (Saros 147)	2009 Aug 06 (Saros 148)
2020 Jul 05 (Saros 149)	2031 Jun 05 (Saros 150)			
		2096 Nov 29 (Saros 156)		

=== Inex series ===
This eclipse is a part of the long period inex cycle, repeating at alternating nodes, every 358 synodic months (≈ 10,571.95 days, or 29 years minus 20 days). Their appearance and longitude are irregular due to a lack of synchronization with the anomalistic month (period of perigee). However, groupings of 3 inex cycles (≈ 87 years minus 2 months) comes close (≈ 1,151.02 anomalistic months), so eclipses are similar in these groupings.

Series members between 1801 and 2200
1814 Feb 04 (Saros 140)	1843 Jan 16 (Saros 141)	1871 Dec 26 (Saros 142)
1900 Dec 06 (Saros 143)	1929 Nov 17 (Saros 144)	1958 Oct 27 (Saros 145)
1987 Oct 07 (Saros 146)	2016 Sep 16 (Saros 147)	2045 Aug 27 (Saros 148)
2074 Aug 07 (Saros 149)	2103 Jul 19 (Saros 150)	2132 Jun 28 (Saros 151)
2161 Jun 08 (Saros 152)	2190 May 19 (Saros 153)	

=== Half-Saros cycle ===
A lunar eclipse will be preceded and followed by solar eclipses by 9 years and 5.5 days (a half saros). This lunar eclipse is related to two partial solar eclipses of Solar Saros 153.

October 2, 1978	October 12, 1996

== See also ==
- List of lunar eclipses
- List of 20th-century lunar eclipses
