= September 1969 lunar eclipse =

Penumbral lunar eclipse September 25, 1969

- Penumbral eclipse
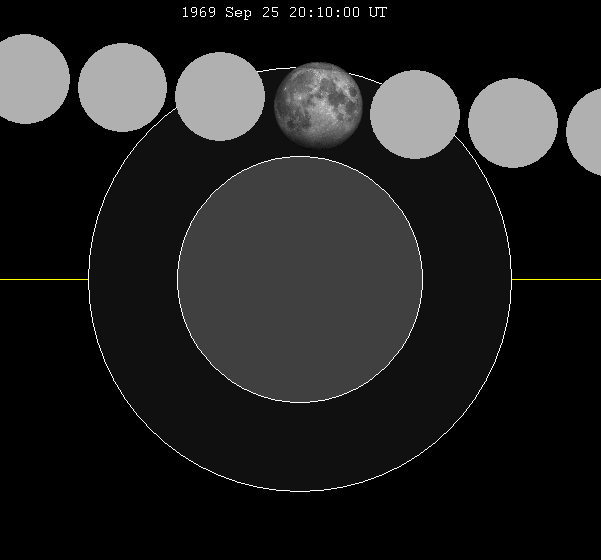
- The Moon's hourly motion shown right to left
- Date: September 25, 1969
- Gamma: 1.0656
- Magnitude: −0.0952
- Saros cycle: 146 (8 of 72)
- Penumbral: 245 minutes, 9 seconds
Contacts (UTC)
- P1: 18:07:03
- Greatest: 20:09:39
- P4: 22:12:12

A penumbral lunar eclipse occurred at the Moon’s ascending node of orbit on Thursday, September 25, 1969, with an umbral magnitude of −0.0952. A lunar eclipse occurs when the Moon moves into the Earth's shadow, causing the Moon to be darkened. A penumbral lunar eclipse occurs when part or all of the Moon's near side passes into the Earth's penumbra. Unlike a solar eclipse, which can only be viewed from a relatively small area of the world, a lunar eclipse may be viewed from anywhere on the night side of Earth. Occurring about 3.4 days after perigee (on September 22, 1969, at 11:45 UTC), the Moon's apparent diameter was larger.

== Visibility ==
The eclipse was completely visible over Europe, Africa, and Asia, seen rising over eastern South America and west Africa and setting over northeast Asia and Australia.

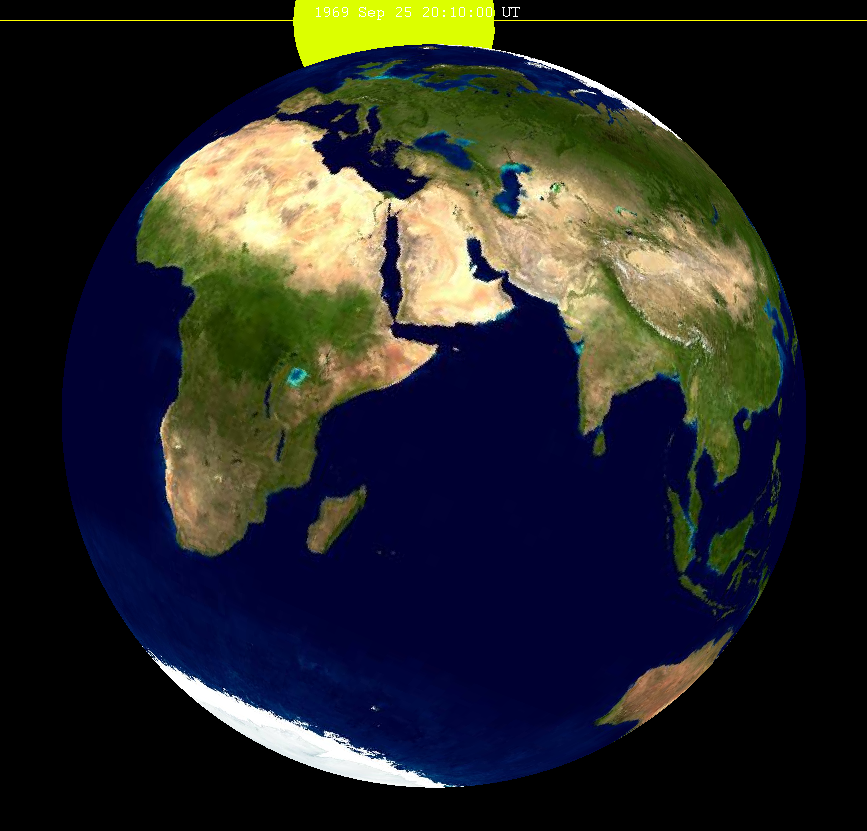
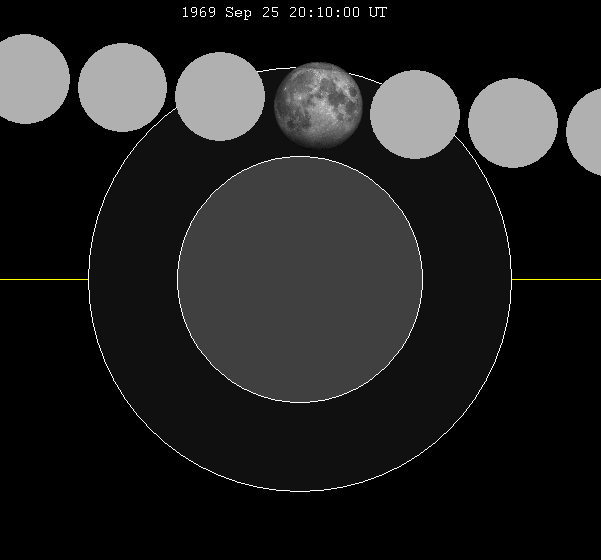

== Eclipse details ==
Shown below is a table displaying details about this particular solar eclipse. It describes various parameters pertaining to this eclipse.

September 25, 1969 Lunar Eclipse Parameters
Parameter	Value
Penumbral Magnitude	0.90080
Umbral Magnitude	−0.09519
Gamma	1.06558
Sun Right Ascension	12h09m26.5s
Sun Declination	-01°01'23.8"
Sun Semi-Diameter	15'57.2"
Sun Equatorial Horizontal Parallax	08.8"
Moon Right Ascension	00h07m25.1s
Moon Declination	+01°56'11.3"
Moon Semi-Diameter	16'01.1"
Moon Equatorial Horizontal Parallax	0°58'47.2"
ΔT	39.9 s

== Eclipse season ==
This eclipse is part of an eclipse season, a period, roughly every six months, when eclipses occur. Only two (or occasionally three) eclipse seasons occur each year, and each season lasts about 35 days and repeats just short of six months (173 days) later; thus two full eclipse seasons always occur each year. Either two or three eclipses happen each eclipse season. In the sequence below, each eclipse is separated by a fortnight. The first and last eclipse in this sequence is separated by one synodic month.

Eclipse season of August–September 1969
August 27 Ascending node (full moon)	September 11 Descending node (new moon)	September 25 Ascending node (full moon)
Penumbral lunar eclipse Lunar Saros 108	Annular solar eclipse Solar Saros 134	Penumbral lunar eclipse Lunar Saros 146

== Related eclipses ==
=== Eclipses in 1969 ===
- An annular solar eclipse on March 18.
- A penumbral lunar eclipse on April 2.
- A penumbral lunar eclipse on August 27.
- An annular solar eclipse on September 11.
- A penumbral lunar eclipse on September 25.

=== Metonic ===
- Preceded by: Lunar eclipse of December 8, 1965
- Followed by: Lunar eclipse of July 15, 1973

=== Tzolkinex ===
- Preceded by: Lunar eclipse of August 15, 1962
- Followed by: Lunar eclipse of November 6, 1976

=== Half-Saros ===
- Preceded by: Solar eclipse of September 20, 1960
- Followed by: Solar eclipse of October 2, 1978

=== Tritos ===
- Preceded by: Lunar eclipse of October 27, 1958
- Followed by: Lunar eclipse of August 26, 1980

=== Lunar Saros 146 ===
- Preceded by: Lunar eclipse of September 15, 1951
- Followed by: Lunar eclipse of October 7, 1987

=== Inex ===
- Preceded by: Lunar eclipse of October 16, 1940
- Followed by: Lunar eclipse of September 6, 1998

=== Triad ===
- Preceded by: Lunar eclipse of November 25, 1882
- Followed by: Lunar eclipse of July 26, 2056

=== Lunar eclipses of 1966–1969 ===
This eclipse is a member of a semester series. An eclipse in a semester series of lunar eclipses repeats approximately every 177 days and 4 hours (a semester) at alternating nodes of the Moon's orbit.

The penumbral lunar eclipse on August 27, 1969 occurs in the next lunar year eclipse set.

Lunar eclipse series sets from 1966 to 1969
Descending node				Ascending node			
Saros	Date Viewing	Type Chart	Gamma	Saros	Date Viewing	Type Chart	Gamma
111	1966 May 04	Penumbral	1.0554	116	1966 Oct 29	Penumbral	−1.0600
121	1967 Apr 24	Total	0.2972	126	1967 Oct 18	Total	−0.3653
131	1968 Apr 13	Total	−0.4173	136	1968 Oct 06	Total	0.3605
141	1969 Apr 02	Penumbral	−1.1765	146	1969 Sep 25	Penumbral	1.0656

=== Saros 146 ===
This eclipse is a part of Saros series 146, repeating every 18 years, 11 days, and containing 72 events. The series started with a penumbral lunar eclipse on July 11, 1843. It contains partial eclipses from October 17, 2005 through May 14, 2348; total eclipses from May 25, 2366 through November 16, 2654; and a second set of partial eclipses from November 27, 2672 through June 12, 2997. The series ends at member 72 as a penumbral eclipse on August 29, 3123.

The longest duration of totality will be produced by member 37 at 99 minutes, 22 seconds on August 8, 2492. All eclipses in this series occur at the Moon’s ascending node of orbit.

Greatest	First			
The greatest eclipse of the series will occur on 2492 Aug 08, lasting 99 minutes, 22 seconds.	Penumbral	Partial	Total	Central
The greatest eclipse of the series will occur on 2492 Aug 08, lasting 99 minutes, 22 seconds.	1843 Jul 11	2005 Oct 17	2366 May 25	2438 Jul 07
The greatest eclipse of the series will occur on 2492 Aug 08, lasting 99 minutes, 22 seconds.	Last			
The greatest eclipse of the series will occur on 2492 Aug 08, lasting 99 minutes, 22 seconds.	Central	Total	Partial	Penumbral
The greatest eclipse of the series will occur on 2492 Aug 08, lasting 99 minutes, 22 seconds.	2546 Sep 11	2654 Nov 16	2997 Jun 12	3123 Aug 29

Eclipses are tabulated in three columns; every third eclipse in the same column is one exeligmos apart, so they all cast shadows over approximately the same parts of the Earth.

Series members 1–20 occur between 1843 and 2200:
1	2	3
1843 Jul 11	1861 Jul 21	1879 Aug 02
4	5	6
1897 Aug 12	1915 Aug 24	1933 Sep 04
7	8	9
1951 Sep 15	1969 Sep 25	1987 Oct 07
10	11	12
2005 Oct 17	2023 Oct 28	2041 Nov 08
13	14	15
2059 Nov 19	2077 Nov 29	2095 Dec 11
16	17	18
2113 Dec 22	2132 Jan 02	2150 Jan 13
19	20	
2168 Jan 24	2186 Feb 04	

=== Tritos series ===
This eclipse is a part of a tritos cycle, repeating at alternating nodes every 135 synodic months (≈ 3986.63 days, or 11 years minus 1 month). Their appearance and longitude are irregular due to a lack of synchronization with the anomalistic month (period of perigee), but groupings of 3 tritos cycles (≈ 33 years minus 3 months) come close (≈ 434.044 anomalistic months), so eclipses are similar in these groupings.

Series members between 1801 and 2078
1806 Jan 05 (Saros 131)	1816 Dec 04 (Saros 132)	1827 Nov 03 (Saros 133)	1838 Oct 03 (Saros 134)	1849 Sep 02 (Saros 135)
1860 Aug 01 (Saros 136)	1871 Jul 02 (Saros 137)	1882 Jun 01 (Saros 138)	1893 Apr 30 (Saros 139)	1904 Mar 31 (Saros 140)
1915 Mar 01 (Saros 141)	1926 Jan 28 (Saros 142)	1936 Dec 28 (Saros 143)	1947 Nov 28 (Saros 144)	1958 Oct 27 (Saros 145)
1969 Sep 25 (Saros 146)	1980 Aug 26 (Saros 147)	1991 Jul 26 (Saros 148)	2002 Jun 24 (Saros 149)	2013 May 25 (Saros 150)
2078 Nov 19 (Saros 156)

=== Inex series ===
This eclipse is a part of the long period inex cycle, repeating at alternating nodes, every 358 synodic months (≈ 10,571.95 days, or 29 years minus 20 days). Their appearance and longitude are irregular due to a lack of synchronization with the anomalistic month (period of perigee). However, groupings of 3 inex cycles (≈ 87 years minus 2 months) comes close (≈ 1,151.02 anomalistic months), so eclipses are similar in these groupings.

Series members between 1801 and 2200
1825 Jan 04 (Saros 141)	1853 Dec 15 (Saros 142)	1882 Nov 25 (Saros 143)
1911 Nov 06 (Saros 144)	1940 Oct 16 (Saros 145)	1969 Sep 25 (Saros 146)
1998 Sep 06 (Saros 147)	2027 Aug 17 (Saros 148)	2056 Jul 26 (Saros 149)
2085 Jul 07 (Saros 150)	2114 Jun 18 (Saros 151)	2143 May 28 (Saros 152)
2172 May 08 (Saros 153)

=== Half-Saros cycle ===
A lunar eclipse will be preceded and followed by solar eclipses by 9 years and 5.5 days (a half saros). This lunar eclipse is related to two partial solar eclipses of Solar Saros 153.

September 20, 1960	October 2, 1978

== See also ==
- List of lunar eclipses
- List of 20th-century lunar eclipses
