= September 1933 lunar eclipse =

Penumbral lunar eclipse September 4, 1933

- Penumbral eclipse
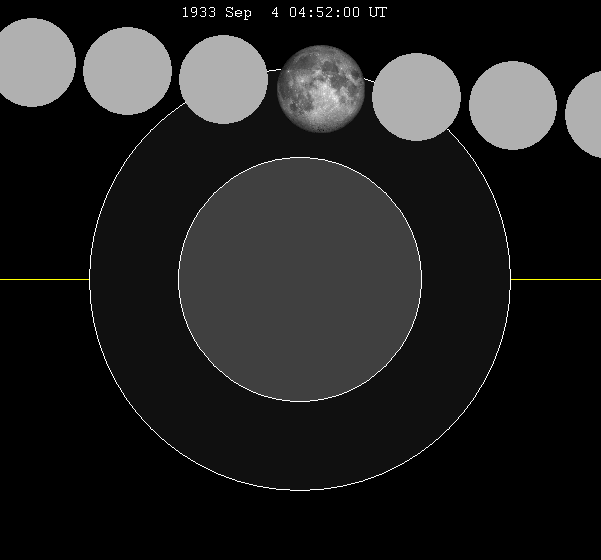
- The Moon's hourly motion shown right to left
- Date: September 4, 1933
- Gamma: 1.1776
- Magnitude: −0.3012
- Saros cycle: 146 (6 of 72)
- Penumbral: 221 minutes, 24 seconds
Contacts (UTC)
- P1: 3:01:11
- Greatest: 4:51:56
- P4: 6:42:34

A penumbral lunar eclipse occurred at the Moon’s ascending node of orbit on Monday, September 4, 1933, with an umbral magnitude of −0.7336. A lunar eclipse occurs when the Moon moves into the Earth's shadow, causing the Moon to be darkened. A penumbral lunar eclipse occurs when part or all of the Moon's near side passes into the Earth's penumbra. Unlike a solar eclipse, which can only be viewed from a relatively small area of the world, a lunar eclipse may be viewed from anywhere on the night side of Earth. Occurring about 3.9 days after perigee (on August 31, 1933, at 6:30 UTC), the Moon's apparent diameter was larger.

This eclipse was the last of four penumbral lunar eclipses in 1933, with the others occurring on February 10, March 12, and August 5.

== Visibility ==
The eclipse was completely visible over much of North and South America, seen rising over northwestern North America and the central Pacific Ocean and setting over Africa and Europe.

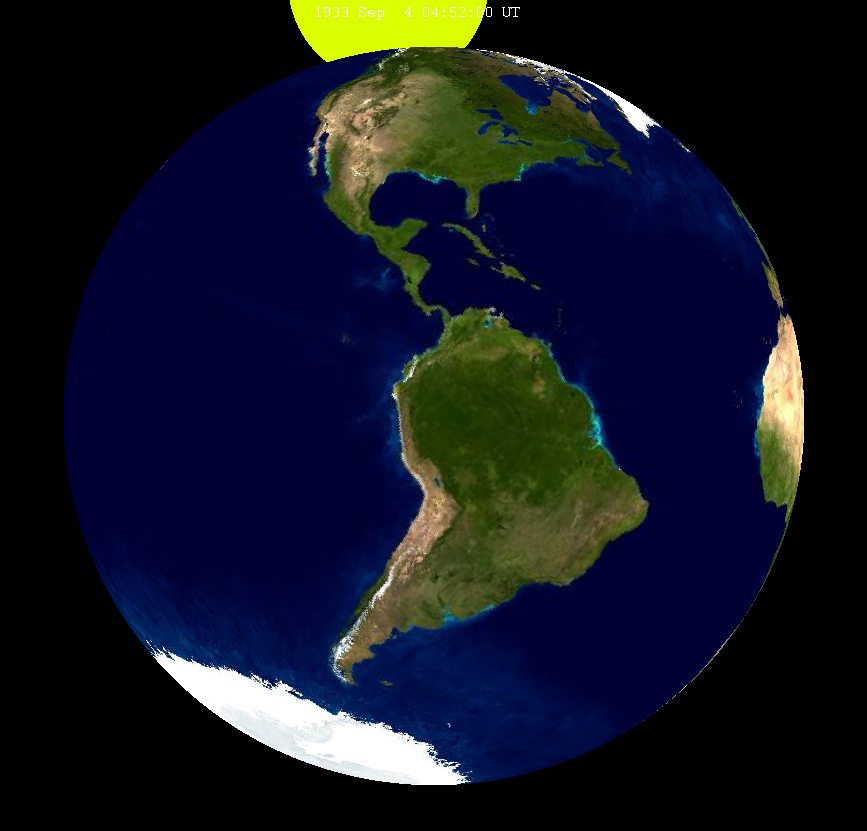
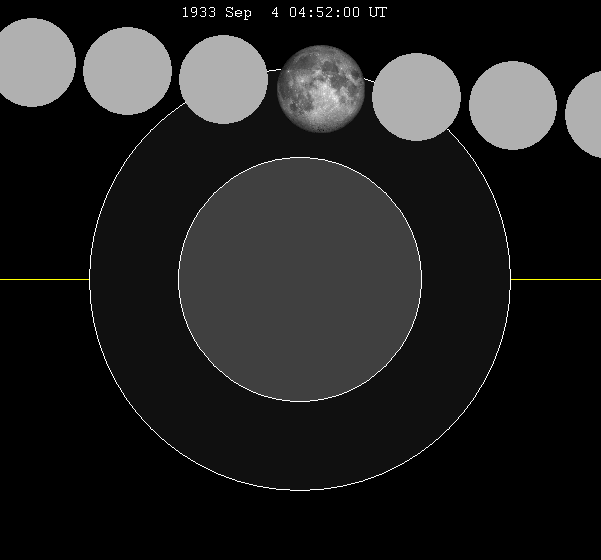

== Eclipse details ==
Shown below is a table displaying details about this particular solar eclipse. It describes various parameters pertaining to this eclipse.

September 4, 1933 Lunar Eclipse Parameters
Parameter	Value
Penumbral Magnitude	0.69558
Umbral Magnitude	−0.30117
Gamma	1.17763
Sun Right Ascension	10h50m36.8s
Sun Declination	+07°22'09.8"
Sun Semi-Diameter	15'51.8"
Sun Equatorial Horizontal Parallax	08.7"
Moon Right Ascension	22h48m27.5s
Moon Declination	-06°21'19.9"
Moon Semi-Diameter	15'54.9"
Moon Equatorial Horizontal Parallax	0°58'24.5"
ΔT	23.9 s

== Eclipse season ==
This eclipse is part of an eclipse season, a period, roughly every six months, when eclipses occur. Only two (or occasionally three) eclipse seasons occur each year, and each season lasts about 35 days and repeats just short of six months (173 days) later; thus two full eclipse seasons always occur each year. Either two or three eclipses happen each eclipse season. In the sequence below, each eclipse is separated by a fortnight. The first and last eclipse in this sequence is separated by one synodic month.

Eclipse season of August–September 1933
August 5 Ascending node (full moon)	August 21 Descending node (new moon)	September 4 Ascending node (full moon)
Penumbral lunar eclipse Lunar Saros 108	Annular solar eclipse Solar Saros 134	Penumbral lunar eclipse Lunar Saros 146

== Related eclipses ==
=== Eclipses in 1933 ===
- A penumbral lunar eclipse on February 10.
- An annular solar eclipse on February 24.
- A penumbral lunar eclipse on March 12.
- A penumbral lunar eclipse on August 5.
- An annular solar eclipse on August 21.
- A penumbral lunar eclipse on September 4.

=== Metonic ===
- Preceded by: Lunar eclipse of November 17, 1929

=== Tzolkinex ===
- Preceded by: Lunar eclipse of July 25, 1926
- Followed by: Lunar eclipse of October 16, 1940

=== Half-Saros ===
- Preceded by: Solar eclipse of August 30, 1924
- Followed by: Solar eclipse of September 10, 1942

=== Tritos ===
- Preceded by: Lunar eclipse of October 6, 1922
- Followed by: Lunar eclipse of August 4, 1944

=== Lunar Saros 146 ===
- Preceded by: Lunar eclipse of August 24, 1915
- Followed by: Lunar eclipse of September 15, 1951

=== Inex ===
- Preceded by: Lunar eclipse of September 24, 1904
- Followed by: Lunar eclipse of August 15, 1962

=== Triad ===
- Preceded by: Lunar eclipse of November 3, 1846
- Followed by: Lunar eclipse of July 5, 2020

=== Lunar eclipses of 1930–1933 ===
This eclipse is a member of a semester series. An eclipse in a semester series of lunar eclipses repeats approximately every 177 days and 4 hours (a semester) at alternating nodes of the Moon's orbit.

The penumbral lunar eclipses on February 10, 1933 and August 5, 1933 occur in the next lunar year eclipse set.

Lunar eclipse series sets from 1930 to 1933
Descending node				Ascending node			
Saros	Date Viewing	Type Chart	Gamma	Saros	Date Viewing	Type Chart	Gamma
111	1930 Apr 13	Partial	0.9545	116	1930 Oct 07	Partial	−0.9812
121	1931 Apr 02	Total	0.2043	126	1931 Sep 26	Total	−0.2698
131	1932 Mar 22	Partial	−0.4956	136	1932 Sep 14	Partial	0.4664
141	1933 Mar 12	Penumbral	−1.2369	146	1933 Sep 04	Penumbral	1.1776

=== Saros 146 ===
This eclipse is a part of Saros series 146, repeating every 18 years, 11 days, and containing 72 events. The series started with a penumbral lunar eclipse on July 11, 1843. It contains partial eclipses from October 17, 2005 through May 14, 2348; total eclipses from May 25, 2366 through November 16, 2654; and a second set of partial eclipses from November 27, 2672 through June 12, 2997. The series ends at member 72 as a penumbral eclipse on August 29, 3123.

The longest duration of totality will be produced by member 37 at 99 minutes, 22 seconds on August 8, 2492. All eclipses in this series occur at the Moon’s ascending node of orbit.

Greatest	First			
The greatest eclipse of the series will occur on 2492 Aug 08, lasting 99 minutes, 22 seconds.	Penumbral	Partial	Total	Central
The greatest eclipse of the series will occur on 2492 Aug 08, lasting 99 minutes, 22 seconds.	1843 Jul 11	2005 Oct 17	2366 May 25	2438 Jul 07
The greatest eclipse of the series will occur on 2492 Aug 08, lasting 99 minutes, 22 seconds.	Last			
The greatest eclipse of the series will occur on 2492 Aug 08, lasting 99 minutes, 22 seconds.	Central	Total	Partial	Penumbral
The greatest eclipse of the series will occur on 2492 Aug 08, lasting 99 minutes, 22 seconds.	2546 Sep 11	2654 Nov 16	2997 Jun 12	3123 Aug 29

Eclipses are tabulated in three columns; every third eclipse in the same column is one exeligmos apart, so they all cast shadows over approximately the same parts of the Earth.

Series members 1–20 occur between 1843 and 2200:
1	2	3
1843 Jul 11	1861 Jul 21	1879 Aug 02
4	5	6
1897 Aug 12	1915 Aug 24	1933 Sep 04
7	8	9
1951 Sep 15	1969 Sep 25	1987 Oct 07
10	11	12
2005 Oct 17	2023 Oct 28	2041 Nov 08
13	14	15
2059 Nov 19	2077 Nov 29	2095 Dec 11
16	17	18
2113 Dec 22	2132 Jan 02	2150 Jan 13
19	20	
2168 Jan 24	2186 Feb 04	

=== Tritos series ===
This eclipse is a part of a tritos cycle, repeating at alternating nodes every 135 synodic months (≈ 3986.63 days, or 11 years minus 1 month). Their appearance and longitude are irregular due to a lack of synchronization with the anomalistic month (period of perigee), but groupings of 3 tritos cycles (≈ 33 years minus 3 months) come close (≈ 434.044 anomalistic months), so eclipses are similar in these groupings.

Series members between 1801 and 2042
1802 Sep 11 (Saros 134)	1813 Aug 12 (Saros 135)	1824 Jul 11 (Saros 136)	1835 Jun 10 (Saros 137)	1846 May 11 (Saros 138)
1857 Apr 09 (Saros 139)	1868 Mar 08 (Saros 140)	1879 Feb 07 (Saros 141)	1890 Jan 06 (Saros 142)	1900 Dec 06 (Saros 143)
1911 Nov 06 (Saros 144)	1922 Oct 06 (Saros 145)	1933 Sep 04 (Saros 146)	1944 Aug 04 (Saros 147)	
		2042 Oct 28 (Saros 156)		

=== Inex series ===
This eclipse is a part of the long period inex cycle, repeating at alternating nodes, every 358 synodic months (≈ 10,571.95 days, or 29 years minus 20 days). Their appearance and longitude are irregular due to a lack of synchronization with the anomalistic month (period of perigee). However, groupings of 3 inex cycles (≈ 87 years minus 2 months) comes close (≈ 1,151.02 anomalistic months), so eclipses are similar in these groupings.

Series members between 1801 and 2200
1817 Nov 23 (Saros 142)	1846 Nov 03 (Saros 143)	1875 Oct 14 (Saros 144)
1904 Sep 24 (Saros 145)	1933 Sep 04 (Saros 146)	1962 Aug 15 (Saros 147)
1991 Jul 26 (Saros 148)	2020 Jul 05 (Saros 149)	2049 Jun 15 (Saros 150)
	2107 May 07 (Saros 152)	2136 Apr 16 (Saros 153)
	2194 Mar 07 (Saros 155)	

=== Half-Saros cycle ===
A lunar eclipse will be preceded and followed by solar eclipses by 9 years and 5.5 days (a half saros). This lunar eclipse is related to two total solar eclipses of Solar Saros 153.

August 30, 1924	September 10, 1942

== See also ==
- List of lunar eclipses and List of 21st-century lunar eclipses
