= September 1951 lunar eclipse =

Penumbral lunar eclipse September 15, 1951

- Penumbral eclipse
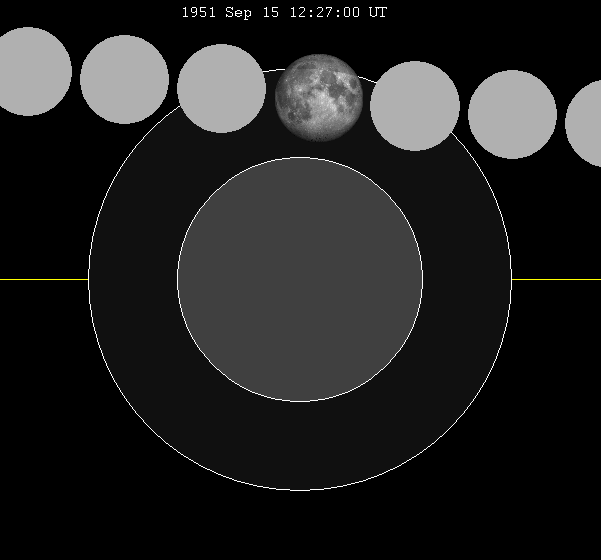
- The Moon's hourly motion shown right to left
- Date: September 15, 1951
- Gamma: 1.1187
- Magnitude: −0.1927
- Saros cycle: 146 (7 of 72)
- Penumbral: 234 minutes, 36 seconds
Contacts (UTC)
- P1: 10:29:16
- Greatest: 12:26:37
- P4: 14:23:52

A penumbral lunar eclipse occurred at the Moon’s ascending node of orbit on Saturday, September 15, 1951, with an umbral magnitude of −0.1927. A lunar eclipse occurs when the Moon moves into the Earth's shadow, causing the Moon to be darkened. A penumbral lunar eclipse occurs when part or all of the Moon's near side passes into the Earth's penumbra. Unlike a solar eclipse, which can only be viewed from a relatively small area of the world, a lunar eclipse may be viewed from anywhere on the night side of Earth. Occurring about 3.6 days after perigee (on September 11, 1951, at 21:30 UTC), the Moon's apparent diameter was larger.

This eclipse was the last of four penumbral lunar eclipses in 1951, with the others occurring on February 21, March 23, and August 17.

== Visibility ==
The eclipse was completely visible over east and northeast Asia, Australia, and northwestern North America, seen rising over central and south Asia and setting over much of North America and western South America.

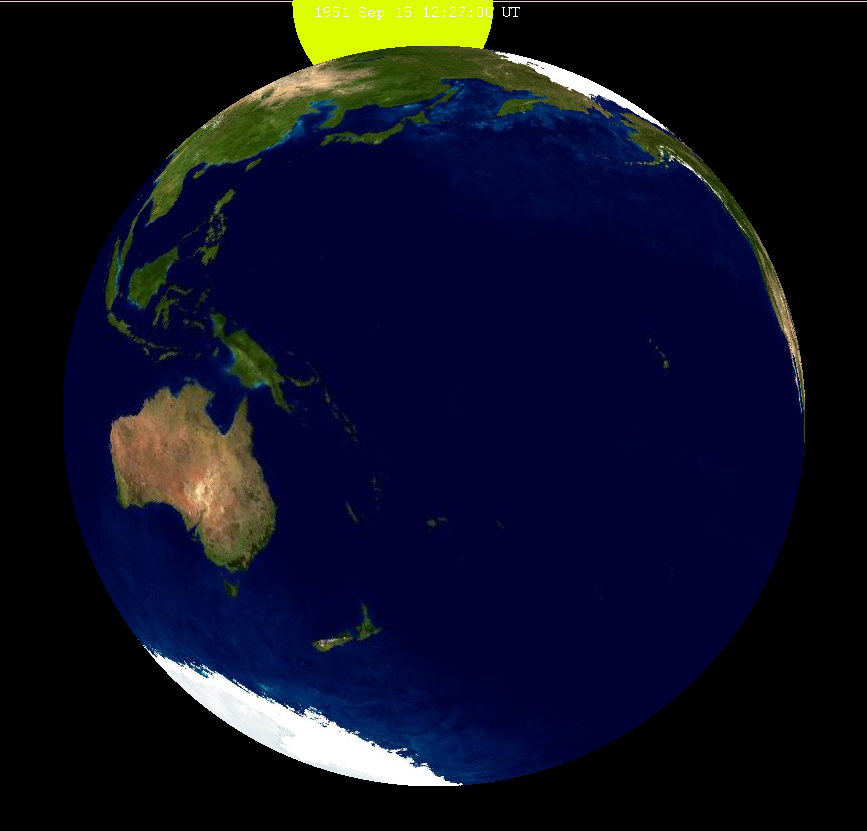
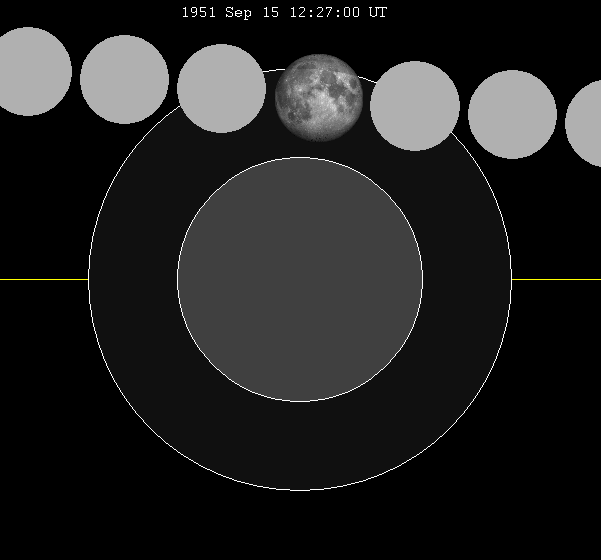

== Eclipse details ==
Shown below is a table displaying details about this particular solar eclipse. It describes various parameters pertaining to this eclipse.

September 15, 1951 Lunar Eclipse Parameters
Parameter	Value
Penumbral Magnitude	0.80351
Umbral Magnitude	−0.19267
Gamma	1.11865
Sun Right Ascension	11h30m04.6s
Sun Declination	+03°13'56.1"
Sun Semi-Diameter	15'54.4"
Sun Equatorial Horizontal Parallax	08.7"
Moon Right Ascension	23h27m58.3s
Moon Declination	-02°16'28.5"
Moon Semi-Diameter	15'58.0"
Moon Equatorial Horizontal Parallax	0°58'36.0"
ΔT	29.8 s

== Eclipse season ==
This eclipse is part of an eclipse season, a period, roughly every six months, when eclipses occur. Only two (or occasionally three) eclipse seasons occur each year, and each season lasts about 35 days and repeats just short of six months (173 days) later; thus two full eclipse seasons always occur each year. Either two or three eclipses happen each eclipse season. In the sequence below, each eclipse is separated by a fortnight. The first and last eclipse in this sequence is separated by one synodic month.

Eclipse season of August–September 1951
August 17 Ascending node (full moon)	September 1 Descending node (new moon)	September 15 Ascending node (full moon)
Penumbral lunar eclipse Lunar Saros 108	Annular solar eclipse Solar Saros 134	Penumbral lunar eclipse Lunar Saros 146

== Related eclipses ==
=== Eclipses in 1951 ===
- A penumbral lunar eclipse on February 21.
- An annular solar eclipse on March 7.
- A penumbral lunar eclipse on March 23.
- A penumbral lunar eclipse on August 17.
- An annular solar eclipse on September 1.
- A penumbral lunar eclipse on September 15.

=== Metonic ===
- Preceded by: Lunar eclipse of November 28, 1947

=== Tzolkinex ===
- Preceded by: Lunar eclipse of August 4, 1944
- Followed by: Lunar eclipse of October 27, 1958

=== Half-Saros ===
- Preceded by: Solar eclipse of September 10, 1942
- Followed by: Solar eclipse of September 20, 1960

=== Tritos ===
- Preceded by: Lunar eclipse of October 16, 1940
- Followed by: Lunar eclipse of August 15, 1962

=== Lunar Saros 146 ===
- Preceded by: Lunar eclipse of September 4, 1933
- Followed by: Lunar eclipse of September 25, 1969

=== Inex ===
- Preceded by: Lunar eclipse of October 6, 1922
- Followed by: Lunar eclipse of August 26, 1980

=== Triad ===
- Preceded by: Lunar eclipse of November 13, 1864
- Followed by: Lunar eclipse of July 16, 2038

=== Lunar eclipses of 1948–1951 ===
This eclipse is a member of a semester series. An eclipse in a semester series of lunar eclipses repeats approximately every 177 days and 4 hours (a semester) at alternating nodes of the Moon's orbit.

The penumbral lunar eclipses on February 21, 1951 and August 17, 1951 occur in the next lunar year eclipse set.

Lunar eclipse series sets from 1948 to 1951
Descending node				Ascending node			
Saros	Date Viewing	Type Chart	Gamma	Saros	Date Viewing	Type Chart	Gamma
111	1948 Apr 23	Partial	1.0017	116	1948 Oct 18	Penumbral	−1.0245
121	1949 Apr 13	Total	0.2474	126	1949 Oct 07	Total	−0.3219
131	1950 Apr 02	Total	−0.4599	136	1950 Sep 26	Total	0.4101
141	1951 Mar 23	Penumbral	−1.2099	146	1951 Sep 15	Penumbral	1.1187

=== Saros 146 ===
This eclipse is a part of Saros series 146, repeating every 18 years, 11 days, and containing 72 events. The series started with a penumbral lunar eclipse on July 11, 1843. It contains partial eclipses from October 17, 2005 through May 14, 2348; total eclipses from May 25, 2366 through November 16, 2654; and a second set of partial eclipses from November 27, 2672 through June 12, 2997. The series ends at member 72 as a penumbral eclipse on August 29, 3123.

The longest duration of totality will be produced by member 37 at 99 minutes, 22 seconds on August 8, 2492. All eclipses in this series occur at the Moon’s ascending node of orbit.

Greatest	First			
The greatest eclipse of the series will occur on 2492 Aug 08, lasting 99 minutes, 22 seconds.	Penumbral	Partial	Total	Central
The greatest eclipse of the series will occur on 2492 Aug 08, lasting 99 minutes, 22 seconds.	1843 Jul 11	2005 Oct 17	2366 May 25	2438 Jul 07
The greatest eclipse of the series will occur on 2492 Aug 08, lasting 99 minutes, 22 seconds.	Last			
The greatest eclipse of the series will occur on 2492 Aug 08, lasting 99 minutes, 22 seconds.	Central	Total	Partial	Penumbral
The greatest eclipse of the series will occur on 2492 Aug 08, lasting 99 minutes, 22 seconds.	2546 Sep 11	2654 Nov 16	2997 Jun 12	3123 Aug 29

Eclipses are tabulated in three columns; every third eclipse in the same column is one exeligmos apart, so they all cast shadows over approximately the same parts of the Earth.

Series members 1–20 occur between 1843 and 2200:
1	2	3
1843 Jul 11	1861 Jul 21	1879 Aug 02
4	5	6
1897 Aug 12	1915 Aug 24	1933 Sep 04
7	8	9
1951 Sep 15	1969 Sep 25	1987 Oct 07
10	11	12
2005 Oct 17	2023 Oct 28	2041 Nov 08
13	14	15
2059 Nov 19	2077 Nov 29	2095 Dec 11
16	17	18
2113 Dec 22	2132 Jan 02	2150 Jan 13
19	20	
2168 Jan 24	2186 Feb 04	

=== Tritos series ===
This eclipse is a part of a tritos cycle, repeating at alternating nodes every 135 synodic months (≈ 3986.63 days, or 11 years minus 1 month). Their appearance and longitude are irregular due to a lack of synchronization with the anomalistic month (period of perigee), but groupings of 3 tritos cycles (≈ 33 years minus 3 months) come close (≈ 434.044 anomalistic months), so eclipses are similar in these groupings.

Series members between 1801 and 2060
1809 Oct 23 (Saros 133)	1820 Sep 22 (Saros 134)	1831 Aug 23 (Saros 135)	1842 Jul 22 (Saros 136)	1853 Jun 21 (Saros 137)
1864 May 21 (Saros 138)	1875 Apr 20 (Saros 139)	1886 Mar 20 (Saros 140)	1897 Feb 17 (Saros 141)	1908 Jan 18 (Saros 142)
1918 Dec 17 (Saros 143)	1929 Nov 17 (Saros 144)	1940 Oct 16 (Saros 145)	1951 Sep 15 (Saros 146)	1962 Aug 15 (Saros 147)
1973 Jul 15 (Saros 148)	1984 Jun 13 (Saros 149)			
			2060 Nov 08 (Saros 156)	

=== Inex series ===
This eclipse is a part of the long period inex cycle, repeating at alternating nodes, every 358 synodic months (≈ 10,571.95 days, or 29 years minus 20 days). Their appearance and longitude are irregular due to a lack of synchronization with the anomalistic month (period of perigee). However, groupings of 3 inex cycles (≈ 87 years minus 2 months) comes close (≈ 1,151.02 anomalistic months), so eclipses are similar in these groupings.

Series members between 1801 and 2154
1806 Dec 25 (Saros 141)	1835 Dec 05 (Saros 142)	1864 Nov 13 (Saros 143)
1893 Oct 25 (Saros 144)	1922 Oct 06 (Saros 145)	1951 Sep 15 (Saros 146)
1980 Aug 26 (Saros 147)	2009 Aug 06 (Saros 148)	2038 Jul 16 (Saros 149)
2067 Jun 27 (Saros 150)	2096 Jun 06 (Saros 151)	2125 May 17 (Saros 152)
2154 Apr 28 (Saros 153)

=== Half-Saros cycle ===
A lunar eclipse will be preceded and followed by solar eclipses by 9 years and 5.5 days (a half saros). This lunar eclipse is related to two total solar eclipses of Solar Saros 153.

September 10, 1942	September 20, 1960

== See also ==
- List of lunar eclipses
- List of 20th-century lunar eclipses
