= November 2012 lunar eclipse =

Penumbral lunar eclipse 28 November 2012

- Penumbral eclipse
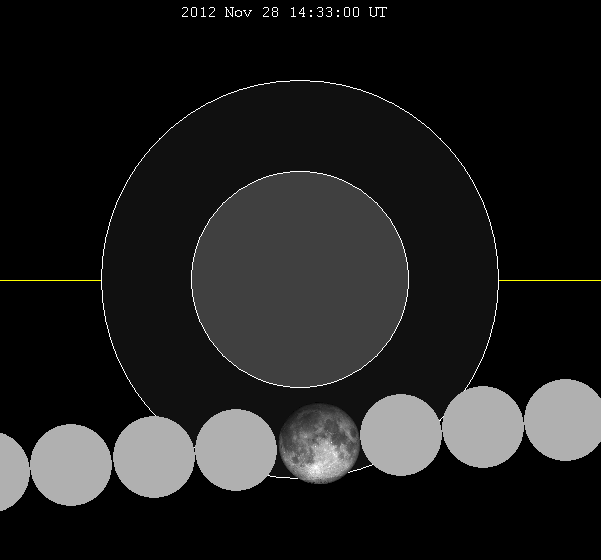
- The northern part of the Moon perceptibly dimmed as the Moon passed through the Earth's penumbral shadow.
- Date: 28 November 2012
- Gamma: −1.0869
- Magnitude: −0.1859
- Saros cycle: 145 (11 of 71)
- Penumbral: 276 minutes, 0 seconds
Contacts (UTC)
- P1: 12:14:59
- Greatest: 14:32:59
- P4: 16:50:59

External image
- https://www.space.com/18636-penumbral-lunar-eclipse-2012-photos.html

A penumbral lunar eclipse occurred at the Moon’s descending node of orbit on Wednesday, 28 November 2012, with an umbral magnitude of −0.1859. A lunar eclipse occurs when the Moon moves into the Earth's shadow, causing the Moon to be darkened. A penumbral lunar eclipse occurs when part or all of the Moon's near side passes into the Earth's penumbra. Unlike a solar eclipse, which can only be viewed from a relatively small area of the world, a lunar eclipse may be viewed from anywhere on the night side of Earth. Occurring only about 3 minutes before apogee (on 28 November 2012, at 14:36 UTC), the Moon's apparent diameter was smaller.

== Visibility ==
The eclipse was completely visible over much of Asia and Australia, seen rising over Europe, the Middle East, and east Africa and setting over North America and the eastern Pacific Ocean.

Hourly motion shown right to left	The Moon's hourly motion across the Earth's shadow in the constellation of Taurus.
Visibility map

== Images ==
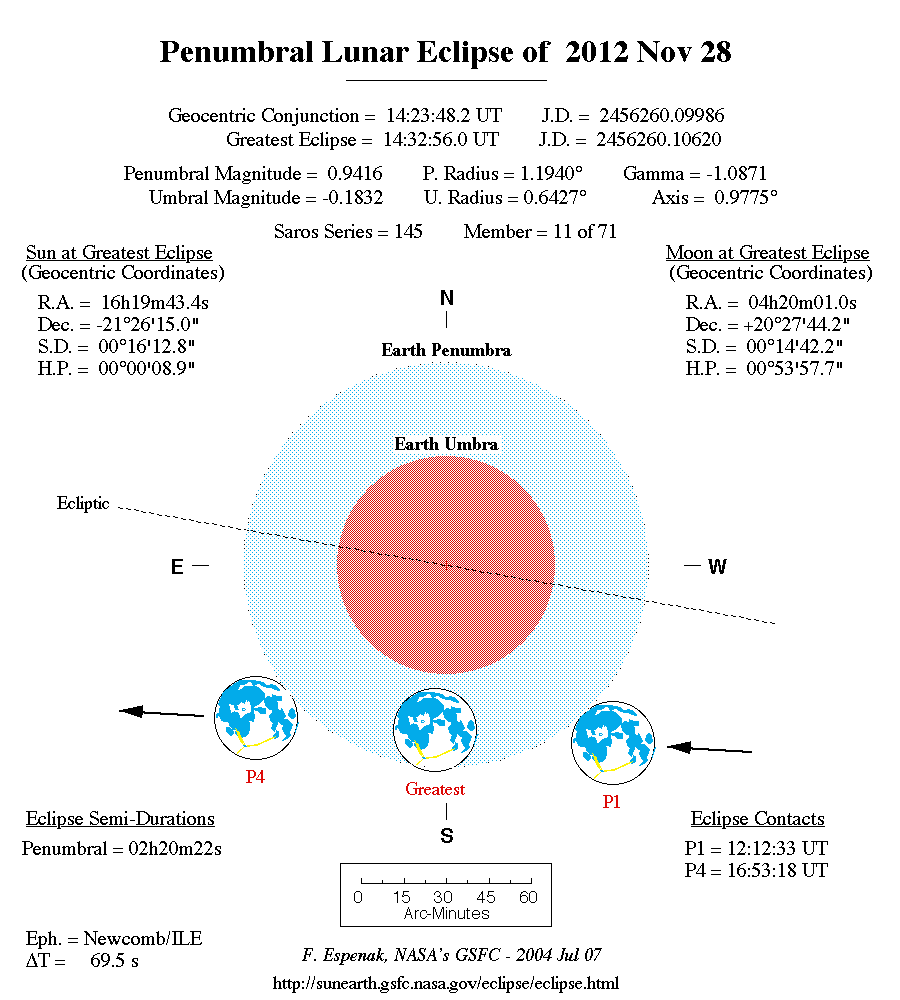
NASA chart of the eclipse

== Eclipse details ==
Shown below is a table displaying details about this particular solar eclipse. It describes various parameters pertaining to this eclipse.

28 November 2012 Lunar Eclipse Parameters
Parameter	Value
Penumbral Magnitude	0.91685
Umbral Magnitude	−0.18589
Gamma	−1.08693
Sun Right Ascension	16h19m43.5s
Sun Declination	-21°26'15.1"
Sun Semi-Diameter	16'12.8"
Sun Equatorial Horizontal Parallax	08.9"
Moon Right Ascension	04h20m01.1s
Moon Declination	+20°27'44.7"
Moon Semi-Diameter	14'42.2"
Moon Equatorial Horizontal Parallax	0°53'57.7"
ΔT	66.9 s

== Eclipse season ==
This eclipse is part of an eclipse season, a period, roughly every six months, when eclipses occur. Only two (or occasionally three) eclipse seasons occur each year, and each season lasts about 35 days and repeats just short of six months (173 days) later; thus two full eclipse seasons always occur each year. Either two or three eclipses happen each eclipse season. In the sequence below, each eclipse is separated by a fortnight.

Eclipse season of November 2012
13 November Ascending node (new moon)	28 November Descending node (full moon)
Total solar eclipse Solar Saros 133	Penumbral lunar eclipse Lunar Saros 145

== Related eclipses ==
=== Eclipses in 2012 ===
- An annular solar eclipse on May 20.
- A partial lunar eclipse on June 4.
- A total solar eclipse on November 13.
- A penumbral lunar eclipse on November 28.

=== Metonic ===
- Preceded by: Lunar eclipse of February 9, 2009
- Followed by: Lunar eclipse of September 16, 2016

=== Tzolkinex ===
- Preceded by: Lunar eclipse of October 17, 2005
- Followed by: Lunar eclipse of January 10, 2020

=== Half-Saros ===
- Preceded by: Solar eclipse of November 23, 2003
- Followed by: Solar eclipse of December 4, 2021

=== Tritos ===
- Preceded by: Lunar eclipse of December 30, 2001
- Followed by: Lunar eclipse of October 28, 2023

=== Lunar Saros 145 ===
- Preceded by: Lunar eclipse of November 18, 1994
- Followed by: Lunar eclipse of December 9, 2030

=== Inex ===
- Preceded by: Lunar eclipse of December 20, 1983
- Followed by: Lunar eclipse of November 8, 2041

=== Triad ===
- Preceded by: Lunar eclipse of January 28, 1926
- Followed by: Lunar eclipse of September 29, 2099

=== Lunar eclipses of 2009–2013 ===
This eclipse is a member of a semester series. An eclipse in a semester series of lunar eclipses repeats approximately every 177 days and 4 hours (a semester) at alternating nodes of the Moon's orbit.

The penumbral lunar eclipses on February 9, 2009 and August 6, 2009 occur in the previous lunar year eclipse set, and the lunar eclipses on April 25, 2013 (partial) and October 18, 2013 (penumbral) occur in the next lunar year eclipse set.

Lunar eclipse series sets from 2009 to 2013
Ascending node				Descending node			
Saros	Date Viewing	Type Chart	Gamma	Saros	Date Viewing	Type Chart	Gamma
110	2009 Jul 07	Penumbral	−1.4916	115	2009 Dec 31	Partial	0.9766
120	2010 Jun 26	Partial	−0.7091	125	2010 Dec 21	Total	0.3214
130	2011 Jun 15	Total	0.0897	135	2011 Dec 10	Total	−0.3882
140	2012 Jun 04	Partial	0.8248	145	2012 Nov 28	Penumbral	−1.0869
150	2013 May 25	Penumbral	1.5351				

=== Saros 145 ===
This eclipse is a part of Saros series 145, repeating every 18 years, 11 days, and containing 71 events. The series started with a penumbral lunar eclipse on August 11, 1832. It contains partial eclipses from February 24, 2157 through June 3, 2319; total eclipses from June 14, 2337 through November 13, 2589; and a second set of partial eclipses from November 25, 2607 through June 21, 2950. The series ends at member 71 as a penumbral eclipse on September 16, 3094.

The longest duration of totality will be produced by member 34 at 104 minutes, 21 seconds on August 7, 2427. All eclipses in this series occur at the Moon’s descending node of orbit.

Greatest	First			
The greatest eclipse of the series will occur on 2427 Aug 07, lasting 104 minutes, 21 seconds.	Penumbral	Partial	Total	Central
The greatest eclipse of the series will occur on 2427 Aug 07, lasting 104 minutes, 21 seconds.	1832 Aug 11	2157 Feb 24	2337 Jun 14	2373 Jul 05
The greatest eclipse of the series will occur on 2427 Aug 07, lasting 104 minutes, 21 seconds.	Last			
The greatest eclipse of the series will occur on 2427 Aug 07, lasting 104 minutes, 21 seconds.	Central	Total	Partial	Penumbral
The greatest eclipse of the series will occur on 2427 Aug 07, lasting 104 minutes, 21 seconds.	2499 Sep 19	2589 Nov 13	2950 Jun 21	3094 Sep 16

Eclipses are tabulated in three columns; every third eclipse in the same column is one exeligmos apart, so they all cast shadows over approximately the same parts of the Earth.

Series members 1–21 occur between 1832 and 2200:
1	2	3
1832 Aug 11	1850 Aug 22	1868 Sep 02
4	5	6
1886 Sep 13	1904 Sep 24	1922 Oct 06
7	8	9
1940 Oct 16	1958 Oct 27	1976 Nov 06
10	11	12
1994 Nov 18	2012 Nov 28	2030 Dec 09
13	14	15
2048 Dec 20	2066 Dec 31	2085 Jan 10
16	17	18
2103 Jan 23	2121 Feb 02	2139 Feb 13
19	20	21
2157 Feb 24	2175 Mar 07	2193 Mar 17

=== Tritos series ===
This eclipse is a part of a tritos cycle, repeating at alternating nodes every 135 synodic months (≈ 3986.63 days, or 11 years minus 1 month). Their appearance and longitude are irregular due to a lack of synchronization with the anomalistic month (period of perigee), but groupings of 3 tritos cycles (≈ 33 years minus 3 months) come close (≈ 434.044 anomalistic months), so eclipses are similar in these groupings.

Series members between 1801 and 2132
1805 Jul 11 (Saros 126)	1816 Jun 10 (Saros 127)	1827 May 11 (Saros 128)	1838 Apr 10 (Saros 129)	1849 Mar 09 (Saros 130)
1860 Feb 07 (Saros 131)	1871 Jan 06 (Saros 132)	1881 Dec 05 (Saros 133)	1892 Nov 04 (Saros 134)	1903 Oct 06 (Saros 135)
1914 Sep 04 (Saros 136)	1925 Aug 04 (Saros 137)	1936 Jul 04 (Saros 138)	1947 Jun 03 (Saros 139)	1958 May 03 (Saros 140)
1969 Apr 02 (Saros 141)	1980 Mar 01 (Saros 142)	1991 Jan 30 (Saros 143)	2001 Dec 30 (Saros 144)	2012 Nov 28 (Saros 145)
2023 Oct 28 (Saros 146)	2034 Sep 28 (Saros 147)	2045 Aug 27 (Saros 148)	2056 Jul 26 (Saros 149)	2067 Jun 27 (Saros 150)
2132 Dec 22 (Saros 156)

=== Inex series ===
This eclipse is a part of the long period inex cycle, repeating at alternating nodes, every 358 synodic months (≈ 10,571.95 days, or 29 years minus 20 days). Their appearance and longitude are irregular due to a lack of synchronization with the anomalistic month (period of perigee). However, groupings of 3 inex cycles (≈ 87 years minus 2 months) comes close (≈ 1,151.02 anomalistic months), so eclipses are similar in these groupings.

Series members between 1801 and 2200
1810 Apr 19 (Saros 138)	1839 Mar 30 (Saros 139)	1868 Mar 08 (Saros 140)
1897 Feb 17 (Saros 141)	1926 Jan 28 (Saros 142)	1955 Jan 08 (Saros 143)
1983 Dec 20 (Saros 144)	2012 Nov 28 (Saros 145)	2041 Nov 08 (Saros 146)
2070 Oct 19 (Saros 147)	2099 Sep 29 (Saros 148)	2128 Sep 09 (Saros 149)
2157 Aug 20 (Saros 150)	2186 Jul 31 (Saros 151)	

=== Half-Saros cycle ===
A lunar eclipse will be preceded and followed by solar eclipses by 9 years and 5.5 days (a half saros). This lunar eclipse is related to two total solar eclipses of Solar Saros 152.

November 23, 2003	December 4, 2021

== See also ==
- Lists of lunar eclipses and List of lunar eclipses in the 21st century
- File:2012-11-28 Lunar Eclipse Sketch.gif Chart
