= November 1994 lunar eclipse =

Penumbral lunar eclipse November 18, 1994

- Penumbral eclipse
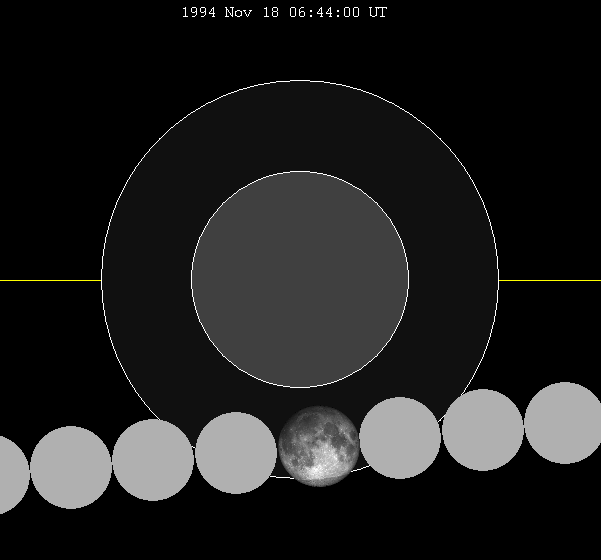
- The Moon's hourly motion shown right to left
- Date: November 18, 1994
- Gamma: −1.1048
- Magnitude: −0.2189
- Saros cycle: 145 (10 of 71)
- Penumbral: 271 minutes, 36 seconds
Contacts (UTC)
- P1: 4:28:04
- Greatest: 6:43:53
- P4: 8:59:41

A penumbral lunar eclipse occurred at the Moon’s descending node of orbit on Friday, November 18, 1994, with an umbral magnitude of −0.2189. A lunar eclipse occurs when the Moon moves into the Earth's shadow, causing the Moon to be darkened. A penumbral lunar eclipse occurs when part or all of the Moon's near side passes into the Earth's penumbra. Unlike a solar eclipse, which can only be viewed from a relatively small area of the world, a lunar eclipse may be viewed from anywhere on the night side of Earth. Occurring only about 1.5 hours after apogee (on November 18, 1994, at 5:05 UTC), the Moon's apparent diameter was smaller.

== Visibility ==
The eclipse was completely visible over North America and western and central South America, seen rising over northeast Asia, eastern Australia, and the western and central Pacific Ocean and setting over eastern South America, west and north Africa, and Europe.

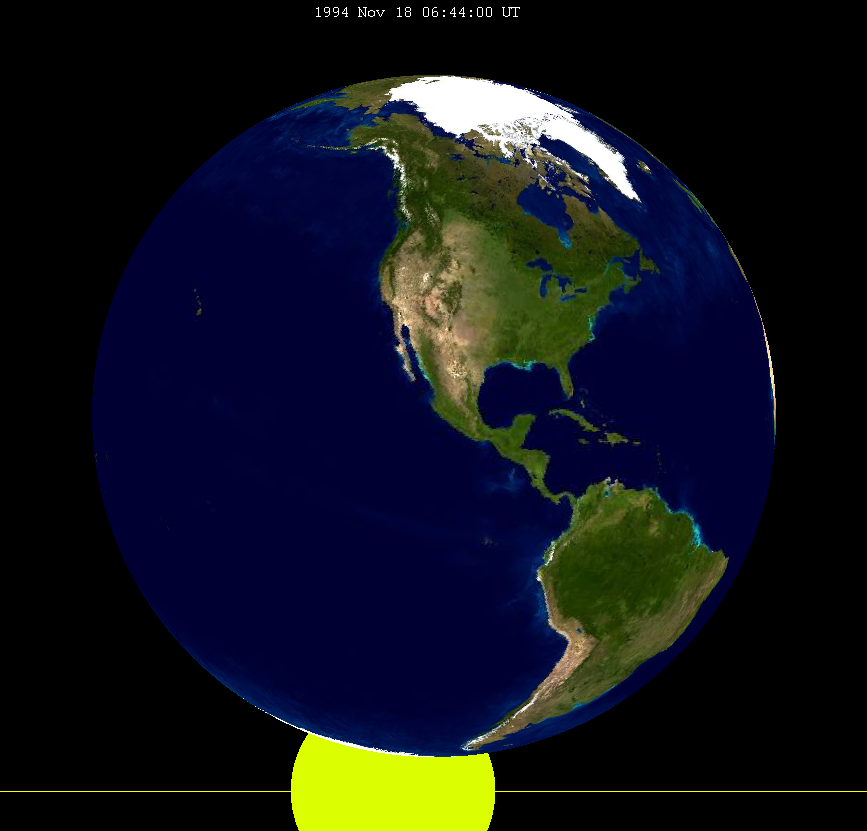
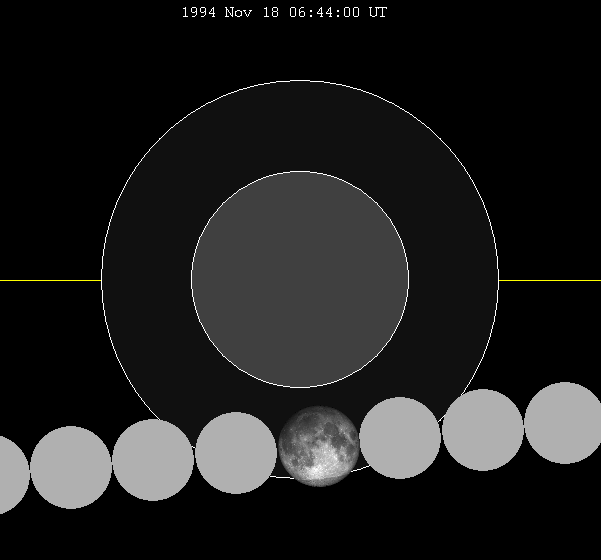

== Eclipse details ==
Shown below is a table displaying details about this particular solar eclipse. It describes various parameters pertaining to this eclipse.

November 18, 1994 Lunar Eclipse Parameters
Parameter	Value
Penumbral Magnitude	0.88156
Umbral Magnitude	−0.21892
Gamma	−1.10479
Sun Right Ascension	15h33m27.5s
Sun Declination	-19°10'54.7"
Sun Semi-Diameter	16'10.9"
Sun Equatorial Horizontal Parallax	08.9"
Moon Right Ascension	03h34m02.6s
Moon Declination	+18°11'52.9"
Moon Semi-Diameter	14'42.2"
Moon Equatorial Horizontal Parallax	0°53'57.7"
ΔT	60.7 s

== Eclipse season ==
This eclipse is part of an eclipse season, a period, roughly every six months, when eclipses occur. Only two (or occasionally three) eclipse seasons occur each year, and each season lasts about 35 days and repeats just short of six months (173 days) later; thus two full eclipse seasons always occur each year. Either two or three eclipses happen each eclipse season. In the sequence below, each eclipse is separated by a fortnight.

Eclipse season of November 1994
November 3 Ascending node (new moon)	November 18 Descending node (full moon)
Total solar eclipse Solar Saros 133	Penumbral lunar eclipse Lunar Saros 145

== Related eclipses ==
=== Eclipses in 1994 ===
- An annular solar eclipse on May 10.
- A partial lunar eclipse on May 25.
- A total solar eclipse on November 3.
- A penumbral lunar eclipse on November 18.

=== Metonic ===
- Preceded by: Lunar eclipse of January 30, 1991
- Followed by: Lunar eclipse of September 6, 1998

=== Tzolkinex ===
- Preceded by: Lunar eclipse of October 7, 1987
- Followed by: Lunar eclipse of December 30, 2001

=== Half-Saros ===
- Preceded by: Solar eclipse of November 12, 1985
- Followed by: Solar eclipse of November 23, 2003

=== Tritos ===
- Preceded by: Lunar eclipse of December 20, 1983
- Followed by: Lunar eclipse of October 17, 2005

=== Lunar Saros 145 ===
- Preceded by: Lunar eclipse of November 6, 1976
- Followed by: Lunar eclipse of November 28, 2012

=== Inex ===
- Preceded by: Lunar eclipse of December 8, 1965
- Followed by: Lunar eclipse of October 28, 2023

=== Triad ===
- Preceded by: Lunar eclipse of January 18, 1908
- Followed by: Lunar eclipse of September 18, 2081

=== Lunar eclipses of 1991–1994 ===
This eclipse is a member of a semester series. An eclipse in a semester series of lunar eclipses repeats approximately every 177 days and 4 hours (a semester) at alternating nodes of the Moon's orbit.

The penumbral lunar eclipses on January 30, 1991 and July 26, 1991 occur in the previous lunar year eclipse set.

Lunar eclipse series sets from 1991 to 1994
Ascending node				Descending node			
Saros	Date Viewing	Type Chart	Gamma	Saros	Date Viewing	Type Chart	Gamma
110	1991 Jun 27	Penumbral	−1.4064	115	1991 Dec 21	Partial	0.9709
120	1992 Jun 15	Partial	−0.6289	125	1992 Dec 09	Total	0.3144
130	1993 Jun 04	Total	0.1638	135	1993 Nov 29	Total	−0.3994
140	1994 May 25	Partial	0.8933	145	1994 Nov 18	Penumbral	−1.1048

=== Saros 145 ===
This eclipse is a part of Saros series 145, repeating every 18 years, 11 days, and containing 71 events. The series started with a penumbral lunar eclipse on August 11, 1832. It contains partial eclipses from February 24, 2157 through June 3, 2319; total eclipses from June 14, 2337 through November 13, 2589; and a second set of partial eclipses from November 25, 2607 through June 21, 2950. The series ends at member 71 as a penumbral eclipse on September 16, 3094.

The longest duration of totality will be produced by member 34 at 104 minutes, 21 seconds on August 7, 2427. All eclipses in this series occur at the Moon’s descending node of orbit.

Greatest	First			
The greatest eclipse of the series will occur on 2427 Aug 07, lasting 104 minutes, 21 seconds.	Penumbral	Partial	Total	Central
The greatest eclipse of the series will occur on 2427 Aug 07, lasting 104 minutes, 21 seconds.	1832 Aug 11	2157 Feb 24	2337 Jun 14	2373 Jul 05
The greatest eclipse of the series will occur on 2427 Aug 07, lasting 104 minutes, 21 seconds.	Last			
The greatest eclipse of the series will occur on 2427 Aug 07, lasting 104 minutes, 21 seconds.	Central	Total	Partial	Penumbral
The greatest eclipse of the series will occur on 2427 Aug 07, lasting 104 minutes, 21 seconds.	2499 Sep 19	2589 Nov 13	2950 Jun 21	3094 Sep 16

Eclipses are tabulated in three columns; every third eclipse in the same column is one exeligmos apart, so they all cast shadows over approximately the same parts of the Earth.

Series members 1–21 occur between 1832 and 2200:
1	2	3
1832 Aug 11	1850 Aug 22	1868 Sep 02
4	5	6
1886 Sep 13	1904 Sep 24	1922 Oct 06
7	8	9
1940 Oct 16	1958 Oct 27	1976 Nov 06
10	11	12
1994 Nov 18	2012 Nov 28	2030 Dec 09
13	14	15
2048 Dec 20	2066 Dec 31	2085 Jan 10
16	17	18
2103 Jan 23	2121 Feb 02	2139 Feb 13
19	20	21
2157 Feb 24	2175 Mar 07	2193 Mar 17

=== Tritos series ===
This eclipse is a part of a tritos cycle, repeating at alternating nodes every 135 synodic months (≈ 3986.63 days, or 11 years minus 1 month). Their appearance and longitude are irregular due to a lack of synchronization with the anomalistic month (period of perigee), but groupings of 3 tritos cycles (≈ 33 years minus 3 months) come close (≈ 434.044 anomalistic months), so eclipses are similar in these groupings.

Series members between 1801 and 2147
1809 Apr 30 (Saros 128)	1820 Mar 29 (Saros 129)	1831 Feb 26 (Saros 130)	1842 Jan 26 (Saros 131)	1852 Dec 26 (Saros 132)
1863 Nov 25 (Saros 133)	1874 Oct 25 (Saros 134)	1885 Sep 24 (Saros 135)	1896 Aug 23 (Saros 136)	1907 Jul 25 (Saros 137)
1918 Jun 24 (Saros 138)	1929 May 23 (Saros 139)	1940 Apr 22 (Saros 140)	1951 Mar 23 (Saros 141)	1962 Feb 19 (Saros 142)
1973 Jan 18 (Saros 143)	1983 Dec 20 (Saros 144)	1994 Nov 18 (Saros 145)	2005 Oct 17 (Saros 146)	2016 Sep 16 (Saros 147)
2027 Aug 17 (Saros 148)	2038 Jul 16 (Saros 149)	2049 Jun 15 (Saros 150)		
			2114 Dec 12 (Saros 156)	
	2147 Sep 09 (Saros 159)			

=== Inex series ===
This eclipse is a part of the long period inex cycle, repeating at alternating nodes, every 358 synodic months (≈ 10,571.95 days, or 29 years minus 20 days). Their appearance and longitude are irregular due to a lack of synchronization with the anomalistic month (period of perigee). However, groupings of 3 inex cycles (≈ 87 years minus 2 months) comes close (≈ 1,151.02 anomalistic months), so eclipses are similar in these groupings.

Series members between 1801 and 2200
1821 Mar 18 (Saros 139)	1850 Feb 26 (Saros 140)	1879 Feb 07 (Saros 141)
1908 Jan 18 (Saros 142)	1936 Dec 28 (Saros 143)	1965 Dec 08 (Saros 144)
1994 Nov 18 (Saros 145)	2023 Oct 28 (Saros 146)	2052 Oct 08 (Saros 147)
2081 Sep 18 (Saros 148)	2110 Aug 29 (Saros 149)	2139 Aug 10 (Saros 150)
2168 Jul 20 (Saros 151)	2197 Jun 29 (Saros 152)	

=== Half-Saros cycle ===
A lunar eclipse will be preceded and followed by solar eclipses by 9 years and 5.5 days (a half saros). This lunar eclipse is related to two total solar eclipses of Solar Saros 152.

November 12, 1985	November 23, 2003

== See also ==
- List of lunar eclipses
- List of 20th-century lunar eclipses
