= October 1958 lunar eclipse =

Penumbral lunar eclipse October 27, 1958

- Penumbral eclipse
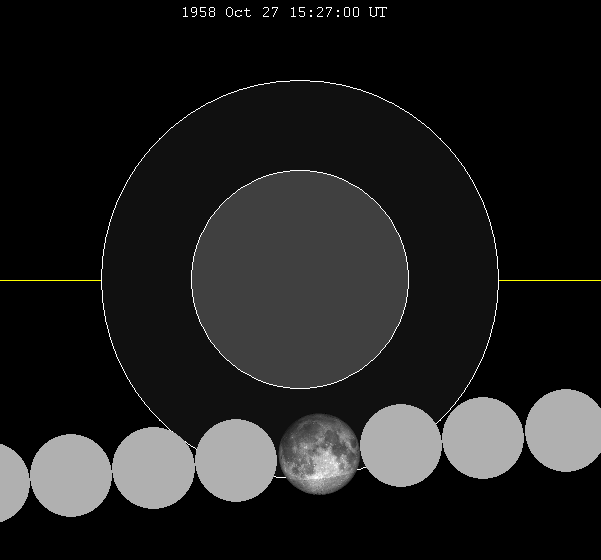
- The Moon's hourly motion shown right to left
- Date: October 27, 1958
- Gamma: −1.1571
- Magnitude: −0.3118
- Saros cycle: 145 (8 of 71)
- Penumbral: 257 minutes, 56 seconds
Contacts (UTC)
- P1: 13:18:19
- Greatest: 15:27:17
- P4: 17:36:15

A penumbral lunar eclipse occurred at the Moon’s descending node of orbit on Monday, October 27, 1958, with an umbral magnitude of −0.3118. A lunar eclipse occurs when the Moon moves into the Earth's shadow, causing the Moon to be darkened. A penumbral lunar eclipse occurs when part or all of the Moon's near side passes into the Earth's penumbra. Unlike a solar eclipse, which can only be viewed from a relatively small area of the world, a lunar eclipse may be viewed from anywhere on the night side of Earth. Occurring only about 15 hours after apogee (on October 27, 1958, at 0:20 UTC), the Moon's apparent diameter was smaller.

== Visibility ==
The eclipse was completely visible over Asia and Australia, seen rising over much of Africa, Europe, and the Middle East and setting over western North America and the central Pacific Ocean.

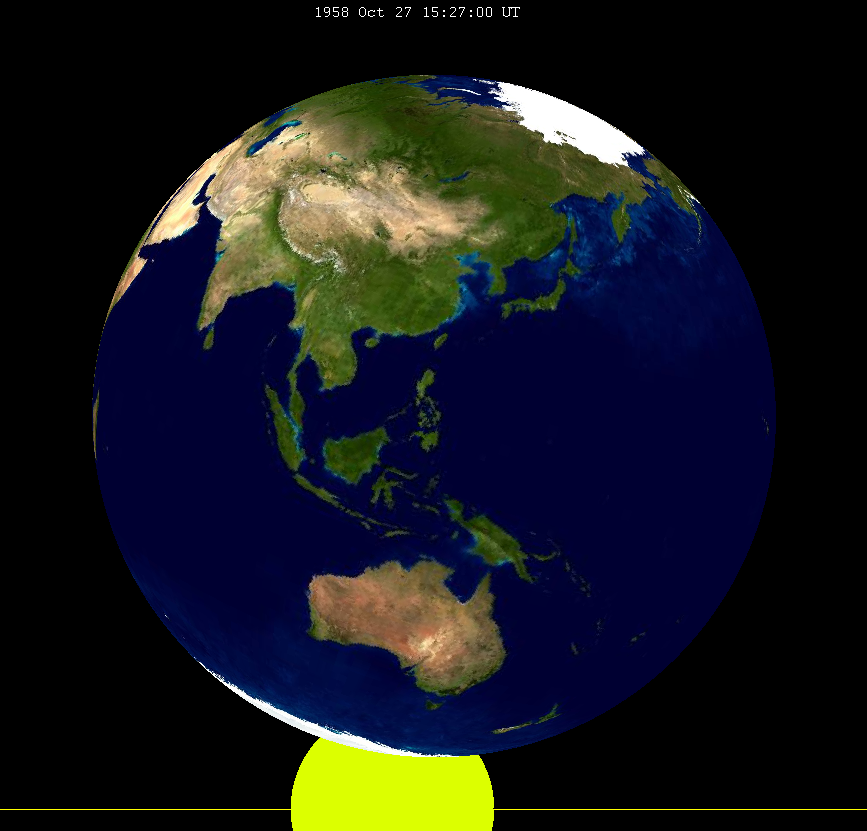
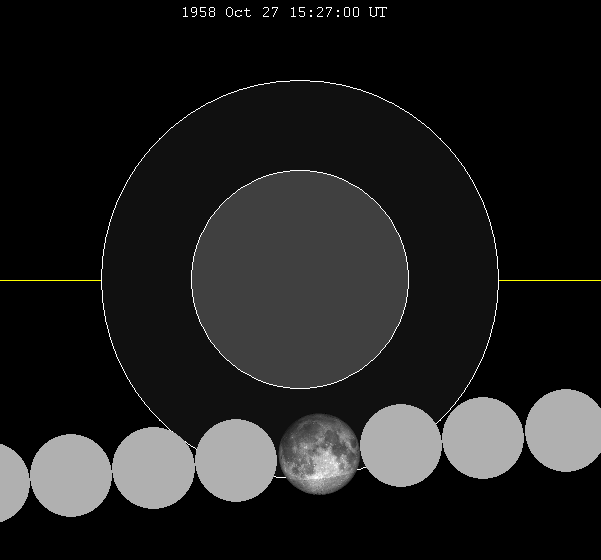

== Eclipse details ==
Shown below is a table displaying details about this particular solar eclipse. It describes various parameters pertaining to this eclipse.

October 27, 1958 Lunar Eclipse Parameters
Parameter	Value
Penumbral Magnitude	0.78251
Umbral Magnitude	−0.31176
Gamma	−1.15707
Sun Right Ascension	14h05m52.5s
Sun Declination	-12°45'16.4"
Sun Semi-Diameter	16'05.8"
Sun Equatorial Horizontal Parallax	08.9"
Moon Right Ascension	02h06m54.9s
Moon Declination	+11°44'42.3"
Moon Semi-Diameter	14'42.6"
Moon Equatorial Horizontal Parallax	0°53'59.2"
ΔT	32.6 s

== Eclipse season ==
This eclipse is part of an eclipse season, a period, roughly every six months, when eclipses occur. Only two (or occasionally three) eclipse seasons occur each year, and each season lasts about 35 days and repeats just short of six months (173 days) later; thus two full eclipse seasons always occur each year. Either two or three eclipses happen each eclipse season. In the sequence below, each eclipse is separated by a fortnight.

Eclipse season of October 1958
October 12 Ascending node (new moon)	October 27 Descending node (full moon)
Total solar eclipse Solar Saros 133	Penumbral lunar eclipse Lunar Saros 145

== Related eclipses ==
=== Eclipses in 1958 ===
- A penumbral lunar eclipse on April 4.
- An annular solar eclipse on April 19.
- A partial lunar eclipse on May 3.
- A total solar eclipse on October 12.
- A penumbral lunar eclipse on October 27.

=== Metonic ===
- Preceded by: Lunar eclipse of January 8, 1955
- Followed by: Lunar eclipse of August 15, 1962

=== Tzolkinex ===
- Preceded by: Lunar eclipse of September 15, 1951
- Followed by: Lunar eclipse of December 8, 1965

=== Half-Saros ===
- Preceded by: Solar eclipse of October 21, 1949
- Followed by: Solar eclipse of November 2, 1967

=== Tritos ===
- Preceded by: Lunar eclipse of November 28, 1947
- Followed by: Lunar eclipse of September 25, 1969

=== Lunar Saros 145 ===
- Preceded by: Lunar eclipse of October 16, 1940
- Followed by: Lunar eclipse of November 6, 1976

=== Inex ===
- Preceded by: Lunar eclipse of November 17, 1929
- Followed by: Lunar eclipse of October 7, 1987

=== Triad ===
- Preceded by: Lunar eclipse of December 26, 1871
- Followed by: Lunar eclipse of August 27, 2045

=== Lunar eclipses of 1955–1958 ===
This eclipse is a member of a semester series. An eclipse in a semester series of lunar eclipses repeats approximately every 177 days and 4 hours (a semester) at alternating nodes of the Moon's orbit.

The penumbral lunar eclipse on January 8, 1955 occurs in the previous lunar year eclipse set, and the penumbral lunar eclipse on April 4, 1958 occurs in the next lunar year eclipse set.

Lunar eclipse series sets from 1955 to 1958
Ascending node				Descending node			
Saros	Date Viewing	Type Chart	Gamma	Saros	Date Viewing	Type Chart	Gamma
110	1955 Jun 05	Penumbral	−1.2384	115	1955 Nov 29	Partial	0.9551
120	1956 May 24	Partial	−0.4726	125	1956 Nov 18	Total	0.2917
130	1957 May 13	Total	0.3046	135	1957 Nov 07	Total	−0.4332
140	1958 May 03	Partial	1.0188	145	1958 Oct 27	Penumbral	−1.1571

=== Saros 145 ===
This eclipse is a part of Saros series 145, repeating every 18 years, 11 days, and containing 71 events. The series started with a penumbral lunar eclipse on August 11, 1832. It contains partial eclipses from February 24, 2157 through June 3, 2319; total eclipses from June 14, 2337 through November 13, 2589; and a second set of partial eclipses from November 25, 2607 through June 21, 2950. The series ends at member 71 as a penumbral eclipse on September 16, 3094.

The longest duration of totality will be produced by member 34 at 104 minutes, 21 seconds on August 7, 2427. All eclipses in this series occur at the Moon’s descending node of orbit.

Greatest	First			
The greatest eclipse of the series will occur on 2427 Aug 07, lasting 104 minutes, 21 seconds.	Penumbral	Partial	Total	Central
The greatest eclipse of the series will occur on 2427 Aug 07, lasting 104 minutes, 21 seconds.	1832 Aug 11	2157 Feb 24	2337 Jun 14	2373 Jul 05
The greatest eclipse of the series will occur on 2427 Aug 07, lasting 104 minutes, 21 seconds.	Last			
The greatest eclipse of the series will occur on 2427 Aug 07, lasting 104 minutes, 21 seconds.	Central	Total	Partial	Penumbral
The greatest eclipse of the series will occur on 2427 Aug 07, lasting 104 minutes, 21 seconds.	2499 Sep 19	2589 Nov 13	2950 Jun 21	3094 Sep 16

Eclipses are tabulated in three columns; every third eclipse in the same column is one exeligmos apart, so they all cast shadows over approximately the same parts of the Earth.

Series members 1–21 occur between 1832 and 2200:
1	2	3
1832 Aug 11	1850 Aug 22	1868 Sep 02
4	5	6
1886 Sep 13	1904 Sep 24	1922 Oct 06
7	8	9
1940 Oct 16	1958 Oct 27	1976 Nov 06
10	11	12
1994 Nov 18	2012 Nov 28	2030 Dec 09
13	14	15
2048 Dec 20	2066 Dec 31	2085 Jan 10
16	17	18
2103 Jan 23	2121 Feb 02	2139 Feb 13
19	20	21
2157 Feb 24	2175 Mar 07	2193 Mar 17

=== Tritos series ===
This eclipse is a part of a tritos cycle, repeating at alternating nodes every 135 synodic months (≈ 3986.63 days, or 11 years minus 1 month). Their appearance and longitude are irregular due to a lack of synchronization with the anomalistic month (period of perigee), but groupings of 3 tritos cycles (≈ 33 years minus 3 months) come close (≈ 434.044 anomalistic months), so eclipses are similar in these groupings.

Series members between 1801 and 2078
1806 Jan 05 (Saros 131)	1816 Dec 04 (Saros 132)	1827 Nov 03 (Saros 133)	1838 Oct 03 (Saros 134)	1849 Sep 02 (Saros 135)
1860 Aug 01 (Saros 136)	1871 Jul 02 (Saros 137)	1882 Jun 01 (Saros 138)	1893 Apr 30 (Saros 139)	1904 Mar 31 (Saros 140)
1915 Mar 01 (Saros 141)	1926 Jan 28 (Saros 142)	1936 Dec 28 (Saros 143)	1947 Nov 28 (Saros 144)	1958 Oct 27 (Saros 145)
1969 Sep 25 (Saros 146)	1980 Aug 26 (Saros 147)	1991 Jul 26 (Saros 148)	2002 Jun 24 (Saros 149)	2013 May 25 (Saros 150)
2078 Nov 19 (Saros 156)

=== Inex series ===
This eclipse is a part of the long period inex cycle, repeating at alternating nodes, every 358 synodic months (≈ 10,571.95 days, or 29 years minus 20 days). Their appearance and longitude are irregular due to a lack of synchronization with the anomalistic month (period of perigee). However, groupings of 3 inex cycles (≈ 87 years minus 2 months) comes close (≈ 1,151.02 anomalistic months), so eclipses are similar in these groupings.

Series members between 1801 and 2200
1814 Feb 04 (Saros 140)	1843 Jan 16 (Saros 141)	1871 Dec 26 (Saros 142)
1900 Dec 06 (Saros 143)	1929 Nov 17 (Saros 144)	1958 Oct 27 (Saros 145)
1987 Oct 07 (Saros 146)	2016 Sep 16 (Saros 147)	2045 Aug 27 (Saros 148)
2074 Aug 07 (Saros 149)	2103 Jul 19 (Saros 150)	2132 Jun 28 (Saros 151)
2161 Jun 08 (Saros 152)	2190 May 19 (Saros 153)	

=== Half-Saros cycle ===
A lunar eclipse will be preceded and followed by solar eclipses by 9 years and 5.5 days (a half saros). This lunar eclipse is related to two solar eclipses of Solar Saros 152.

October 21, 1949	November 2, 1967

== See also ==
- List of lunar eclipses
- List of 20th-century lunar eclipses
