= Lunar Saros 146 =

Cycle of lunar eclipses

Member 10	Member 11
2005 Oct 17	2023 Oct 28

Saros cycle series 146 for lunar eclipses occurs at the moon's ascending node, repeating approximately every 18 years 11 and 1/3 days. It contains 72 events.

This lunar saros is linked to Solar Saros 153.

Cat.	Saros	Mem	Date	Time UT (hr:mn)	Type	Gamma	Magnitude	Duration (min)			Contacts UT (hr:mn)						Chart
Cat.	Saros	Mem	Date	Greatest	Type	Gamma	Magnitude	Pen.	Par.	Tot.	P1	P4	U1	U2	U3	U4	Chart
09281	146	1	1843 Jul 11	16:49:54	Penumbral	1.5468	-0.9831	43.3			16:28:15	17:11:33					
09326	146	2	1861 Jul 21	23:50:38	Penumbral	1.4659	-0.8334	116.6			22:52:20	0:48:56					
09370	146	3	1879 Aug 02	6:57:44	Penumbral	1.3889	-0.6909	155.0			5:40:14	8:15:14					
09414	146	4	1897 Aug 12	14:08:38	Penumbral	1.3135	-0.5517	183.2			12:37:02	15:40:14					
09456	146	5	1915 Aug 24	21:27:17	Penumbral	1.2435	-0.4226	204.4			19:45:05	23:09:29					
09498	146	6	1933 Sep 04	4:52:20	Penumbral	1.1776	-0.3013	221.4			3:01:38	6:43:02					
09539	146	7	1951 Sep 15	12:27:06	Penumbral	1.1186	-0.1928	234.6			10:29:48	14:24:24					
09580	146	8	1969 Sep 25	20:10:19	Penumbral	1.0655	-0.0953	245.1			18:07:46	22:12:52					
09621	146	9	1987 Oct 07	4:02:30	Penumbral	1.0189	-0.0096	253.5			1:55:45	6:09:15					
09662	146	10	2005 Oct 17	12:04:27	Partial	0.9796	0.0625	259.8	56.0		9:54:33	14:14:21	11:36:27			12:32:27	
09703	146	11	2023 Oct 28	20:15:18	Partial	0.9471	0.1220	264.6	77.4		18:03:00	22:27:36	19:36:36			20:54:00	
09744	146	12	2041 Nov 08	4:35:05	Partial	0.9212	0.1696	268.0	90.3		2:21:05	6:49:05	3:49:56			5:20:14	
09784	146	13	2059 Nov 19	13:01:36	Partial	0.9004	0.2079	270.5	99.2		10:46:21	15:16:51	12:12:00			13:51:12	
09825	146	14	2077 Nov 29	21:35:53	Partial	0.8854	0.2356	272.0	105.0		19:19:53	23:51:53	20:43:23			22:28:23	
09866	146	15	2095 Dec 11	6:15:02	Partial	0.8742	0.2565	272.9	108.9		3:58:35	8:31:29	5:20:35			7:09:29	
09908	146	16	2113 Dec 22	14:58:42	Partial	0.8666	0.2712	273.2	111.5		12:42:06	17:15:18	14:02:57			15:54:27	
09950	146	17	2132 Jan 02	23:44:22	Partial	0.8604	0.2835	273.4	113.6		21:27:40	2:01:04	22:47:34			0:41:10	
09994	146	18	2150 Jan 13	8:31:35	Partial	0.8552	0.2941	273.3	115.3		6:14:56	10:48:14	7:33:56			9:29:14	
10038	146	19	2168 Jan 24	17:17:30	Partial	0.8487	0.3073	273.4	117.4		15:00:48	19:34:12	16:18:48			18:16:12	
10081	146	20	2186 Feb 04	2:01:15	Partial	0.8402	0.3244	273.7	120.1		23:44:24	4:18:06	1:01:12			3:01:18	
10124	146	21	2204 Feb 16	10:41:26	Partial	0.8285	0.3475	274.5	123.7		8:24:11	12:58:41	9:39:35			11:43:17	
10168	146	22	2222 Feb 26	19:17:36	Partial	0.8137	0.3767	275.6	128.0		16:59:48	21:35:24	18:13:36			20:21:36	
10213	146	23	2240 Mar 09	3:46:50	Partial	0.7925	0.4175	277.4	133.8		1:28:08	6:05:32	2:39:56			4:53:44	
10258	146	24	2258 Mar 20	12:10:19	Partial	0.7663	0.4676	279.8	140.3		9:50:25	14:30:13	11:00:10			13:20:28	
10304	146	25	2276 Mar 30	20:26:06	Partial	0.7334	0.5301	282.8	147.8		18:04:42	22:47:30	19:12:12			21:40:00	
10351	146	26	2294 Apr 11	4:36:13	Partial	0.6956	0.6014	286.1	155.5		2:13:10	6:59:16	3:18:28			5:53:58	
10397	146	27	2312 Apr 22	12:37:09	Partial	0.6499	0.6873	290.0	163.8		10:12:09	15:02:09	11:15:15			13:59:03	
10443	146	28	2330 May 3	20:33:07	Partial	0.5998	0.7810	293.9	171.8		18:06:10	23:00:04	19:07:13			21:59:01	
10489	146	29	2348 May 14	4:21:14	Partial	0.5425	0.8878	298.0	179.7		1:52:14	6:50:14	2:51:23			5:51:05	
10534	146	30	2366 May 25	12:05:08	Total	0.4817	1.0007	302.0	186.9	3.9	9:34:08	14:36:08	10:31:41	12:03:11	12:07:05	13:38:35	
10579	146	31	2384 Jun 04	19:42:06	Total	0.4149	1.1244	305.7	193.6	50.8	17:09:15	22:14:57	18:05:18	19:16:42	20:07:30	21:18:54	
10624	146	32	2402 Jun 16	3:16:59	Total	0.3462	1.2513	309.1	199.2	69.4	0:42:26	5:51:32	1:37:23	2:42:17	3:51:41	4:56:35	
10669	146	33	2420 Jun 26	10:47:40	Total	0.2737	1.3849	311.9	203.9	82.0	8:11:43	13:23:37	9:05:43	10:06:40	11:28:40	12:29:37	
10713	146	34	2438 Jul 07	18:17:19	Total	0.2003	1.5199	314.2	207.5	90.5	15:40:13	20:54:25	16:33:34	17:32:04	19:02:34	20:01:04	
10757	146	35	2456 Jul 18	1:45:42	Total	0.1257	1.6567	315.9	210.0	96.1	23:07:45	4:23:39	0:00:42	0:57:39	2:33:45	3:30:42	
10799	146	36	2474 Jul 29	9:15:38	Total	0.0523	1.7910	316.9	211.3	98.9	6:37:11	11:54:05	7:29:59	8:26:11	10:05:05	11:01:17	
10840	146	37	2492 Aug 08	16:47:17	Total	-0.0195	1.8505	317.3	211.6	99.4	14:08:38	19:25:56	15:01:29	15:57:35	17:36:59	18:33:05	
10881	146	38	2510 Aug 21	0:21:36	Total	-0.0891	1.7219	317.2	210.9	97.7	21:43:00	3:00:12	22:36:09	23:32:45	1:10:27	2:07:03	
10921	146	39	2528 Aug 31	8:00:19	Total	-0.1549	1.5999	316.6	209.3	94.1	5:22:01	10:38:37	6:15:40	7:13:16	8:47:22	9:44:58	
10962	146	40	2546 Sep 11	15:43:56	Total	-0.2167	1.4850	315.6	207.1	88.7	13:06:08	18:21:44	14:00:23	14:59:35	16:28:17	17:27:29	
11004	146	41	2564 Sep 21	23:33:16	Total	-0.2732	1.3795	314.4	204.3	81.6	20:56:04	2:10:28	21:51:07	22:52:28	0:14:04	1:15:25	
11045	146	42	2582 Oct 03	7:29:03	Total	-0.3243	1.2839	313.0	201.2	73.0	4:52:33	10:05:33	5:48:27	6:52:33	8:05:33	9:09:39	
11085	146	43	2600 Oct 14	15:31:59	Total	-0.3690	1.1998	311.6	197.9	63.0	12:56:11	18:07:47	13:53:02	15:00:29	16:03:29	17:10:56	
11125	146	44	2618 Oct 25	23:42:26	Total	-0.4073	1.1276	310.4	194.8	51.5	21:07:14	2:17:38	22:05:02	23:16:41	0:08:11	1:19:50	
11166	146	45	2636 Nov 05	7:58:56	Total	-0.4402	1.0651	309.3	191.8	37.5	5:24:17	10:33:35	6:23:02	7:40:11	8:17:41	9:34:50	
11207	146	46	2654 Nov 16	16:23:11	Total	-0.4662	1.0153	308.6	189.2	18.5	13:48:53	18:57:29	14:48:35	16:13:56	16:32:26	17:57:47	
11249	146	47	2672 Nov 27	0:53:08	Partial	-0.4868	0.9755	308.1	187.1		22:19:05	3:27:11	23:19:35			2:26:41	
11292	146	48	2690 Dec 08	9:29:22	Partial	-0.5021	0.9455	307.9	185.5		6:55:25	12:03:19	7:56:37			11:02:07	
11335	146	49	2708 Dec 19	18:08:42	Partial	-0.5144	0.9212	307.9	184.2		15:34:45	20:42:39	16:36:36			19:40:48	
11377	146	50	2726 Dec 31	2:52:31	Partial	-0.5225	0.9048	308.2	183.4		0:18:25	5:26:37	1:20:49			4:24:13	
11419	146	51	2745 Jan 10	11:37:38	Partial	-0.5292	0.8912	308.6	182.8		9:03:20	14:11:56	10:06:14			13:09:02	
11463	146	52	2763 Jan 21	20:23:35	Partial	-0.5347	0.8801	309.0	182.3		17:49:05	22:58:05	18:52:26			21:54:44	
11507	146	53	2781 Feb 01	5:07:58	Partial	-0.5411	0.8674	309.4	181.8		2:33:16	7:42:40	3:37:04			6:38:52	
11553	146	54	2799 Feb 12	13:50:02	Partial	-0.5492	0.8520	309.6	181.1		11:15:14	16:24:50	12:19:29			15:20:35	
11600	146	55	2817 Feb 22	22:27:41	Partial	-0.5604	0.8309	309.5	179.9		19:52:56	1:02:26	20:57:44			23:57:38	
11648	146	56	2835 Mar 06	6:59:29	Partial	-0.5761	0.8019	309.0	178.1		4:24:59	9:33:59	5:30:26			8:28:32	
11694	146	57	2853 Mar 16	15:24:48	Partial	-0.5965	0.7643	308.1	175.4		12:50:45	17:58:51	13:57:06			16:52:30	
11740	146	58	2871 Mar 27	23:42:41	Partial	-0.6226	0.7165	306.6	171.7		21:09:23	2:15:59	22:16:50			1:08:32	
11786	146	59	2889 Apr 07	7:51:21	Partial	-0.6557	0.6556	304.2	166.4		5:19:15	10:23:27	6:28:09			9:14:33	
11831	146	60	2907 Apr 19	15:51:24	Partial	-0.6955	0.5826	301.0	159.1		13:20:54	18:21:54	14:31:51			17:10:57	
11876	146	61	2925 Apr 29	23:42:01	Partial	-0.7423	0.4967	296.6	149.4		21:13:43	2:10:19	22:27:19			0:56:43	
11921	146	62	2943 May 11	7:24:37	Partial	-0.7949	0.4000	291.1	136.5		4:59:04	9:50:10	6:16:22			8:32:52	
11967	146	63	2961 May 21	14:56:55	Partial	-0.8551	0.2893	283.9	118.4		12:34:58	17:18:52	13:57:43			15:56:07	
12012	146	64	2979 Jun 01	22:22:35	Partial	-0.9200	0.1697	275.1	92.5		20:05:02	0:40:08	21:36:20			23:08:50	
12056	146	65	2997 Jun 12	5:40:06	Partial	-0.9909	0.0389	264.0	45.2		3:28:06	7:52:06	5:17:30			6:02:42	
-	146	66	3015 Jun 24	12:52:15	Penumbral	-1.0651	-0.0982	250.8									
-	146	67	3033 Jul 04	19:57:36	Penumbral	-1.1438	-0.02348	234.4									
-	146	68	3051 Jul 16	3:00:27	Penumbral	-1.2235	-0.3914	214.9									
-	146	69	3069 Jul 26	9:59:54	Penumbral	-1.3051	-0.5428	190.8									
-	146	70	3087 Aug 06	16:58:01	Penumbral	-1.3866	-0.6943	160.9									
-	146	71	3105 Aug 17	23:56:01	Penumbral	-1.4671	-0.8440	121.2									
-	146	72	3123 Aug 29	6:55:44	Penumbral	-1.5449	-0.9891	55.5									

== See also ==
- List of lunar eclipses
  - List of Saros series for lunar eclipses
