= November 1976 lunar eclipse =

Penumbral lunar eclipse November 6, 1976

- Penumbral eclipse
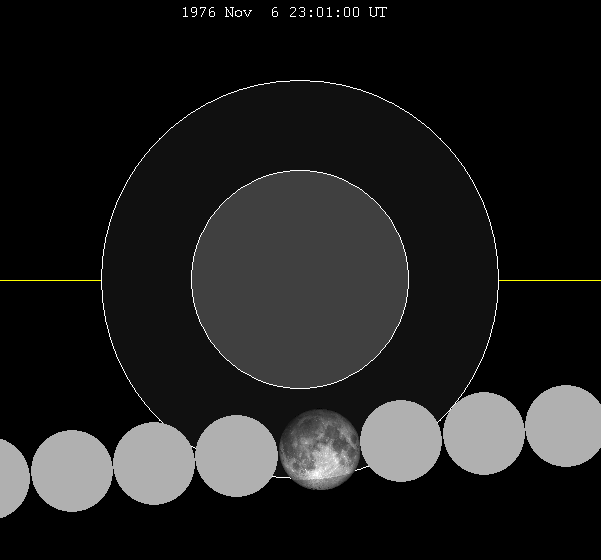
- The Moon's hourly motion shown right to left
- Date: November 6, 1976
- Gamma: −1.1276
- Magnitude: −0.2593
- Saros cycle: 145 (9 of 71)
- Penumbral: 265 minutes, 47 seconds
Contacts (UTC)
- P1: 20:48:18
- Greatest: 23:01:12
- P4: 1:14:05

A penumbral lunar eclipse occurred at the Moon’s descending node of orbit on Saturday, November 6, 1976, with an umbral magnitude of −0.2593. A lunar eclipse occurs when the Moon moves into the Earth's shadow, causing the Moon to be darkened. A penumbral lunar eclipse occurs when part or all of the Moon's near side passes into the Earth's penumbra. Unlike a solar eclipse, which can only be viewed from a relatively small area of the world, a lunar eclipse may be viewed from anywhere on the night side of Earth. Occurring only about 8 hours after apogee (on November 6, 1976, at 14:40 UTC), the Moon's apparent diameter was smaller.

== Visibility ==
The eclipse was completely visible over Africa, Europe, and west and central Asia, seen rising over North and South America and setting over east, northeast, and south Asia and western Australia.

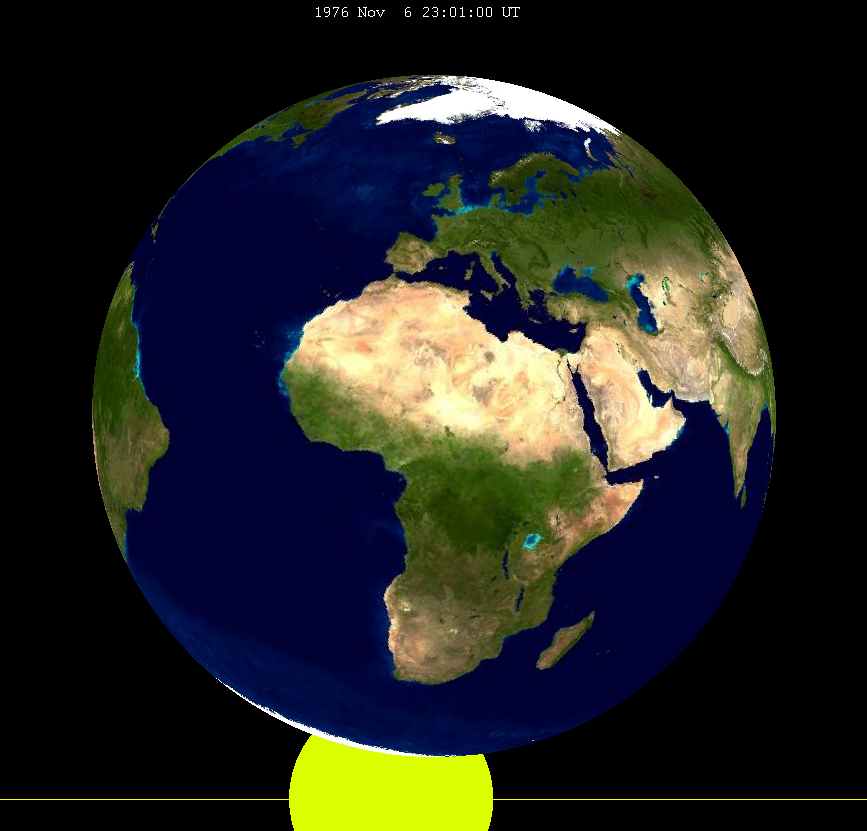
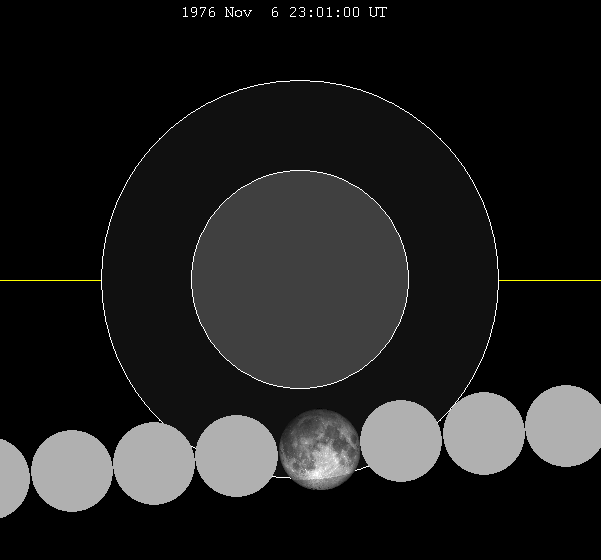

== Eclipse details ==
Shown below is a table displaying details about this particular solar eclipse. It describes various parameters pertaining to this eclipse.

November 6, 1976 Lunar Eclipse Parameters
Parameter	Value
Penumbral Magnitude	0.83827
Umbral Magnitude	−0.25934
Gamma	−1.12760
Sun Right Ascension	14h48m49.1s
Sun Declination	-16°14'19.9"
Sun Semi-Diameter	16'08.5"
Sun Equatorial Horizontal Parallax	08.9"
Moon Right Ascension	02h49m39.2s
Moon Declination	+15°14'41.2"
Moon Semi-Diameter	14'42.3"
Moon Equatorial Horizontal Parallax	0°53'58.2"
ΔT	47.4 s

== Eclipse season ==
This eclipse is part of an eclipse season, a period, roughly every six months, when eclipses occur. Only two (or occasionally three) eclipse seasons occur each year, and each season lasts about 35 days and repeats just short of six months (173 days) later; thus two full eclipse seasons always occur each year. Either two or three eclipses happen each eclipse season. In the sequence below, each eclipse is separated by a fortnight.

Eclipse season of October–November 1976
October 23 Ascending node (new moon)	November 6 Descending node (full moon)
Total solar eclipse Solar Saros 133	Penumbral lunar eclipse Lunar Saros 145

== Related eclipses ==
=== Eclipses in 1976 ===
- An annular solar eclipse on April 29.
- A partial lunar eclipse on May 13.
- A total solar eclipse on October 23.
- A penumbral lunar eclipse on November 6.

=== Metonic ===
- Preceded by: Lunar eclipse of January 18, 1973
- Followed by: Lunar eclipse of August 26, 1980

=== Tzolkinex ===
- Preceded by: Lunar eclipse of September 25, 1969
- Followed by: Lunar eclipse of December 20, 1983

=== Half-Saros ===
- Preceded by: Solar eclipse of November 2, 1967
- Followed by: Solar eclipse of November 12, 1985

=== Tritos ===
- Preceded by: Lunar eclipse of December 8, 1965
- Followed by: Lunar eclipse of October 7, 1987

=== Lunar Saros 145 ===
- Preceded by: Lunar eclipse of October 27, 1958
- Followed by: Lunar eclipse of November 18, 1994

=== Inex ===
- Preceded by: Lunar eclipse of November 28, 1947
- Followed by: Lunar eclipse of October 17, 2005

=== Triad ===
- Preceded by: Lunar eclipse of January 6, 1890
- Followed by: Lunar eclipse of September 7, 2063

=== Lunar eclipses of 1973–1976 ===
This eclipse is a member of a semester series. An eclipse in a semester series of lunar eclipses repeats approximately every 177 days and 4 hours (a semester) at alternating nodes of the Moon's orbit.

The penumbral lunar eclipses on January 18, 1973 and July 15, 1973 occur in the previous lunar year eclipse set.

Lunar eclipse series sets from 1973 to 1976
Ascending node				Descending node			
Saros	Date Viewing	Type Chart	Gamma	Saros	Date Viewing	Type Chart	Gamma
110	1973 Jun 15	Penumbral	−1.3217	115	1973 Dec 10	Partial	0.9644
120	1974 Jun 04	Partial	−0.5489	125	1974 Nov 29	Total	0.3054
130	1975 May 25	Total	0.2367	135	1975 Nov 18	Total	−0.4134
140	1976 May 13	Partial	0.9586	145	1976 Nov 06	Penumbral	−1.1276

=== Saros 145 ===
This eclipse is a part of Saros series 145, repeating every 18 years, 11 days, and containing 71 events. The series started with a penumbral lunar eclipse on August 11, 1832. It contains partial eclipses from February 24, 2157 through June 3, 2319; total eclipses from June 14, 2337 through November 13, 2589; and a second set of partial eclipses from November 25, 2607 through June 21, 2950. The series ends at member 71 as a penumbral eclipse on September 16, 3094.

The longest duration of totality will be produced by member 34 at 104 minutes, 21 seconds on August 7, 2427. All eclipses in this series occur at the Moon’s descending node of orbit.

Greatest	First			
The greatest eclipse of the series will occur on 2427 Aug 07, lasting 104 minutes, 21 seconds.	Penumbral	Partial	Total	Central
The greatest eclipse of the series will occur on 2427 Aug 07, lasting 104 minutes, 21 seconds.	1832 Aug 11	2157 Feb 24	2337 Jun 14	2373 Jul 05
The greatest eclipse of the series will occur on 2427 Aug 07, lasting 104 minutes, 21 seconds.	Last			
The greatest eclipse of the series will occur on 2427 Aug 07, lasting 104 minutes, 21 seconds.	Central	Total	Partial	Penumbral
The greatest eclipse of the series will occur on 2427 Aug 07, lasting 104 minutes, 21 seconds.	2499 Sep 19	2589 Nov 13	2950 Jun 21	3094 Sep 16

Eclipses are tabulated in three columns; every third eclipse in the same column is one exeligmos apart, so they all cast shadows over approximately the same parts of the Earth.

Series members 1–21 occur between 1832 and 2200:
1	2	3
1832 Aug 11	1850 Aug 22	1868 Sep 02
4	5	6
1886 Sep 13	1904 Sep 24	1922 Oct 06
7	8	9
1940 Oct 16	1958 Oct 27	1976 Nov 06
10	11	12
1994 Nov 18	2012 Nov 28	2030 Dec 09
13	14	15
2048 Dec 20	2066 Dec 31	2085 Jan 10
16	17	18
2103 Jan 23	2121 Feb 02	2139 Feb 13
19	20	21
2157 Feb 24	2175 Mar 07	2193 Mar 17

=== Tritos series ===
This eclipse is a part of a tritos cycle, repeating at alternating nodes every 135 synodic months (≈ 3986.63 days, or 11 years minus 1 month). Their appearance and longitude are irregular due to a lack of synchronization with the anomalistic month (period of perigee), but groupings of 3 tritos cycles (≈ 33 years minus 3 months) come close (≈ 434.044 anomalistic months), so eclipses are similar in these groupings.

Series members between 1801 and 2096
1802 Mar 19 (Saros 129)	1813 Feb 15 (Saros 130)	1824 Jan 16 (Saros 131)	1834 Dec 16 (Saros 132)	1845 Nov 14 (Saros 133)
1856 Oct 13 (Saros 134)	1867 Sep 14 (Saros 135)	1878 Aug 13 (Saros 136)	1889 Jul 12 (Saros 137)	1900 Jun 13 (Saros 138)
1911 May 13 (Saros 139)	1922 Apr 11 (Saros 140)	1933 Mar 12 (Saros 141)	1944 Feb 09 (Saros 142)	1955 Jan 08 (Saros 143)
1965 Dec 08 (Saros 144)	1976 Nov 06 (Saros 145)	1987 Oct 07 (Saros 146)	1998 Sep 06 (Saros 147)	2009 Aug 06 (Saros 148)
2020 Jul 05 (Saros 149)	2031 Jun 05 (Saros 150)			
		2096 Nov 29 (Saros 156)		

=== Inex series ===
This eclipse is a part of the long period inex cycle, repeating at alternating nodes, every 358 synodic months (≈ 10,571.95 days, or 29 years minus 20 days). Their appearance and longitude are irregular due to a lack of synchronization with the anomalistic month (period of perigee). However, groupings of 3 inex cycles (≈ 87 years minus 2 months) comes close (≈ 1,151.02 anomalistic months), so eclipses are similar in these groupings.

Series members between 1801 and 2200
1803 Mar 08 (Saros 139)	1832 Feb 16 (Saros 140)	1861 Jan 26 (Saros 141)
1890 Jan 06 (Saros 142)	1918 Dec 17 (Saros 143)	1947 Nov 28 (Saros 144)
1976 Nov 06 (Saros 145)	2005 Oct 17 (Saros 146)	2034 Sep 28 (Saros 147)
2063 Sep 07 (Saros 148)	2092 Aug 17 (Saros 149)	2121 Jul 30 (Saros 150)
2150 Jul 09 (Saros 151)	2179 Jun 19 (Saros 152)	

=== Half-Saros cycle ===
A lunar eclipse will be preceded and followed by solar eclipses by 9 years and 5.5 days (a half saros). This lunar eclipse is related to two total solar eclipses of Solar Saros 152.

November 2, 1967	November 12, 1985

== See also ==
- List of lunar eclipses
- List of 20th-century lunar eclipses
