= Solar Saros 153 =

Saros cycle series 153 for solar eclipses

Animation of the series

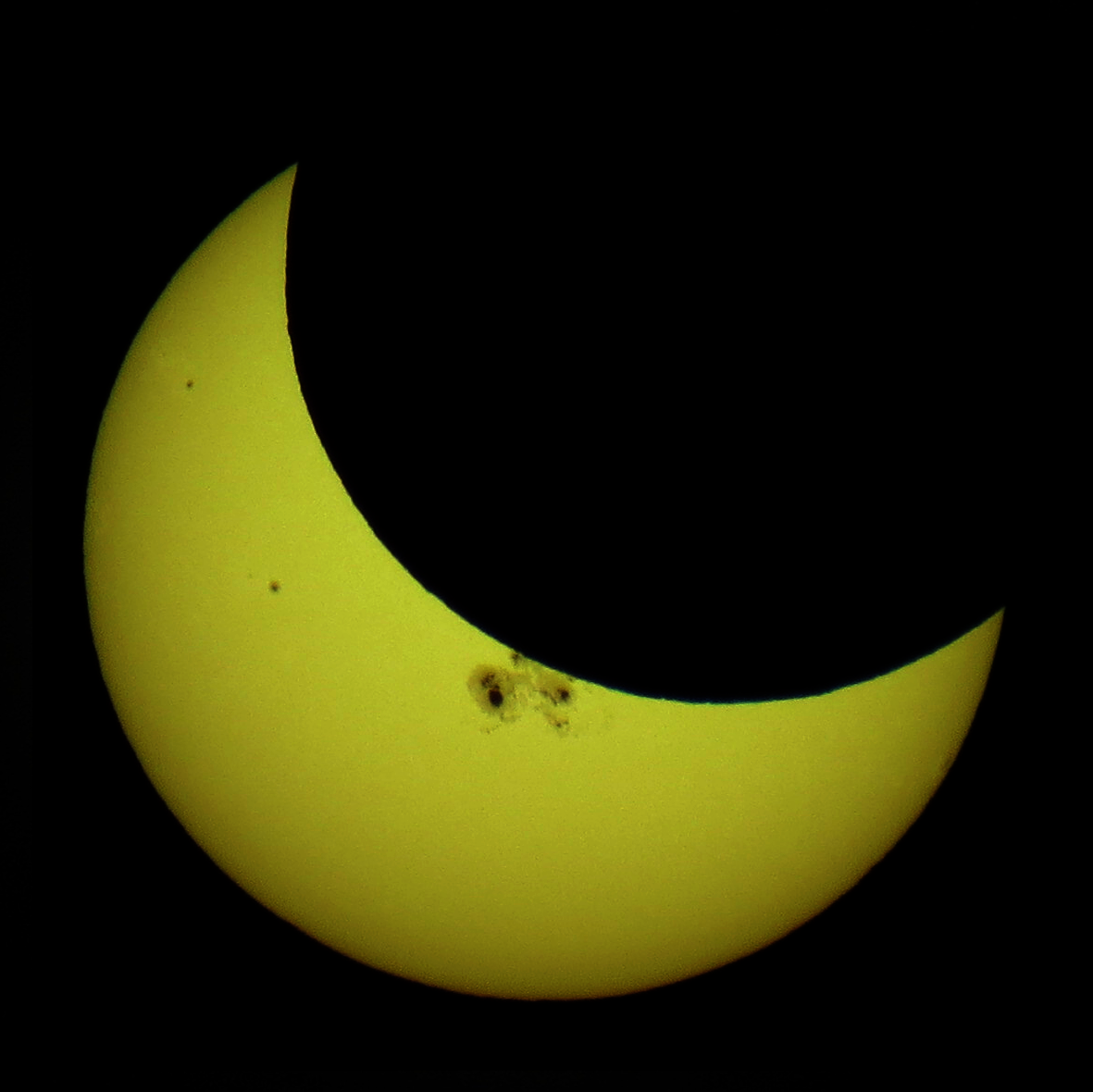
October 23, 2014 Minneapolis, Minnesota Series member 9

Saros cycle series 153 for solar eclipses occurs at the Moon's ascending node, repeating every 18 years, 11 days, containing 70 eclipses, 49 of which will be umbral, all annular. The first eclipse in the series was on 28 July 1870 and the last will be on 22 August 3114. The most recent eclipse was a partial eclipse on 23 October 2014 and the next will be a partial eclipse on 3 November 2032.

The longest eclipse will be 7 minutes 11 seconds on 5 September 2537.

This solar saros is linked to Lunar Saros 146.

== Umbral eclipses ==
Umbral eclipses (annular, total and hybrid) can be further classified as either: 1) Central (two limits), 2) Central (one limit) or 3) Non-Central (one limit). The statistical distribution of these classes in Saros series 153 appears in the following table.

Classification	Number	Percent
All Umbral eclipses	49	100.00%
Central (two limits)	43	87.76%
Central (one limit)	2	4.08%
Non-central (one limit)	4	8.16%

== All eclipses ==
Saros	Member	Date	Time (Greatest) UTC	Type	Location Lat, Long	Gamma	Mag.	Width (km)	Duration (min:sec)	Ref
153	1	July 28, 1870	11:02:31	Partial	69.2N 170.9E	1.5044	0.0742			
153	2	August 7, 1888	18:05:46	Partial	70.1N 53E	1.4369	0.1983			
153	3	August 20, 1906	1:12:50	Partial	70.8N 66.4W	1.3731	0.3147			
153	4	August 30, 1924	8:23:00	Partial	71.5N 172.9E	1.3123	0.4245			
153	5	September 10, 1942	15:39:32	Partial	71.9N 50E	1.2571	0.523			
153	6	September 20, 1960	22:59:56	Partial	72.1N 74.1W	1.2057	0.6139			
153	7	October 2, 1978	6:28:43	Partial	72N 159.6E	1.1616	0.6905			
153	8	October 12, 1996	14:03:04	Partial	71.7N 32.1E	1.1227	0.7575			
153	9	October 23, 2014	21:45:39	Partial	71.2N 97.2W	1.0908	0.8114			
153	10	November 3, 2032	5:34:13	Partial	70.4N 132.6E	1.0643	0.8554			
153	11	November 14, 2050	13:30:53	Partial	69.5N 1E	1.0447	0.8874			
153	12	November 24, 2068	21:32:30	Partial	68.5N 131.1W	1.0299	0.9109			
153	13	December 6, 2086	5:38:55	Partial	67.4N 96.2E	1.0194	0.9271			
153	14	December 17, 2104	13:48:27	Annular (Note: Non-central)	66.4N 36.6W	1.012	0.9381	-	-	
153	15	December 28, 2122	22:00:56	Annular (Note: Non-central)	65.3N 169.8W	1.0072	0.945	-	-	
153	16	January 8, 2141	6:12:38	Annular (Note: Non-central)	64.3N 57.7E	1.0024	0.9522	-	-	
153	17	January 19, 2159	14:23:27	Annular (Note: Non-central)	63.4N 74.2W	0.9974	0.96	-	-	
153	18	January 29, 2177	22:30:30	Annular (Note: One limit)	57.6N 165.1E	0.9897	0.9212	-	6m 55s	
153	19	February 10, 2195	6:34:27	Annular (Note: One limit)	55.2N 41.6E	0.9797	0.9218	-	6m 52s	
153	20	February 21, 2213	14:30:14	Annular	53.4N 78.6W	0.9635	0.923	1080	6m 44s	
153	21	March 4, 2231	22:20:24	Annular	52.4N 163E	0.943	0.9246	838	6m 32s	
153	22	March 15, 2249	6:00:45	Annular	52N 48.4E	0.9149	0.9266	666	6m 18s	
153	23	March 26, 2267	13:33:45	Annular	52.3N 63.7W	0.881	0.9289	549	6m 3s	
153	24	April 5, 2285	20:55:23	Annular	52.9N 171.4W	0.8379	0.9315	459	5m 50s	
153	25	April 18, 2303	4:09:26	Annular	53.8N 83.7E	0.7889	0.9341	393	5m 38s	
153	26	April 28, 2321	11:12:59	Annular	54.5N 17W	0.7315	0.9367	341	5m 30s	
153	27	May 9, 2339	18:08:04	Annular	54.7N 114.5W	0.6672	0.9392	300	5m 24s	
153	28	May 20, 2357	0:54:23	Annular	53.9N 151E	0.5961	0.9415	269	5m 24s	
153	29	May 31, 2375	7:34:33	Annular	52N 57.9E	0.52	0.9436	243	5m 26s	
153	30	June 10, 2393	14:08:41	Annular	48.8N 34.4W	0.4389	0.9453	224	5m 34s	
153	31	June 21, 2411	20:37:43	Annular	44.2N 126.9W	0.3537	0.9467	210	5m 46s	
153	32	July 2, 2429	3:04:30	Annular	38.6N 139.6E	0.2668	0.9476	200	6m 1s	
153	33	July 13, 2447	9:29:35	Annular	32.2N 45.1E	0.1786	0.9481	194	6m 18s	
153	34	July 23, 2465	15:54:48	Annular	25N 50.6W	0.0904	0.9482	191	6m 35s	
153	35	August 3, 2483	22:21:18	Annular	17.4N 147.7W	0.003	0.9479	192	6m 50s	
153	36	August 15, 2501	4:52:08	Annular	9.5N 113.4E	-0.081	0.9471	195	7m 1s	
153	37	August 26, 2519	11:27:49	Annular	1.4N 12.7E	-0.161	0.946	201	7m 8s	
153	38	September 5, 2537	18:08:59	Annular	6.7S 89.6W	-0.2368	0.9446	210	7m 11s	
153	39	September 17, 2555	0:58:18	Annular	14.8S 165.9E	-0.3061	0.9429	221	7m 10s	
153	40	September 27, 2573	7:55:50	Annular	22.7S 59.4E	-0.369	0.9411	233	7m 6s	
153	41	October 8, 2591	15:02:49	Annular	30.2S 49.1W	-0.4245	0.9393	247	7m 0s	
153	42	October 19, 2609	22:18:05	Annular	37.4S 159.2W	-0.4734	0.9375	263	6m 53s	
153	43	October 31, 2627	5:43:51	Annular	44S 89.1E	-0.514	0.9358	278	6m 44s	
153	44	November 10, 2645	13:18:36	Annular	49.9S 23.6W	-0.5477	0.9344	293	6m 35s	
153	45	November 21, 2663	21:02:01	Annular	54.9S 136.6W	-0.5747	0.9333	305	6m 26s	
153	46	December 2, 2681	4:53:55	Annular	58.6S 110.4E	-0.5952	0.9326	314	6m 18s	
153	47	December 13, 2699	12:52:50	Annular	60.9S 2.3W	-0.6106	0.9325	320	6m 8s	
153	48	December 24, 2717	20:58:06	Annular	61.5S 115.6W	-0.621	0.9329	321	6m 0s	
153	49	January 5, 2736	5:06:12	Annular	60.6S 130E	-0.63	0.934	318	5m 50s	
153	50	January 15, 2754	13:18:44	Annular	58.3S 13.1E	-0.6358	0.9356	310	5m 39s	
153	51	January 26, 2772	21:31:18	Annular	55.2S 105.7W	-0.6426	0.9378	300	5m 27s	
153	52	February 6, 2790	5:44:15	Annular	51.5S 133.7E	-0.6495	0.9407	286	5m 12s	
153	53	February 17, 2808	13:53:37	Annular	47.8S 12.9E	-0.6601	0.9441	271	4m 56s	
153	54	February 27, 2826	22:01:00	Annular	44.2S 108.3W	-0.6729	0.948	254	4m 38s	
153	55	March 10, 2844	6:02:50	Annular	41S 131.5E	-0.6913	0.9523	236	4m 18s	
153	56	March 21, 2862	13:59:08	Annular	38.5S 12.4E	-0.7148	0.957	218	3m 55s	
153	57	March 31, 2880	21:48:29	Annular	36.8S 105.1W	-0.7447	0.9619	201	3m 32s	
153	58	April 12, 2898	5:31:42	Annular	36.2S 138.9E	-0.7801	0.9669	185	3m 6s	
153	59	April 23, 2916	13:07:22	Annular	37.1S 24.8E	-0.8223	0.9718	173	2m 39s	
153	60	May 4, 2934	20:36:37	Annular	39.7S 87.5W	-0.8706	0.9764	168	2m 12s	
153	61	May 15, 2952	3:59:11	Annular	44.9S 162.2E	-0.9249	0.9803	182	1m 46s	
153	62	May 26, 2970	11:17:06	Annular	55.7S 55.7E	-0.9834	0.9826	362	1m 26s	
153	63	June 5, 2988	18:28:53	Partial	64.8S 51.6W	-1.0476	0.9018			
153	64	June 18, 3006	1:38:21	Partial	65.8S 168.4W	-1.1143	0.7829			
153	65	June 28, 3024	8:44:29	Partial	66.8S 75.2E	-1.1841	0.6570			
153	66	July 9, 3042	15:51:12	Partial	67.8S 41.7W	-1.2542	0.5293			
153	67	July 19, 3060	22:56:05	Partial	68.8S 158.6W	-1.3262	0.3971			
153	68	July 31, 3078	6:04:38	Partial	69.7S 82.9E	-1.3958	0.2684			
153	69	August 10, 3096	13:14:10	Partial	70.5S 36.3W	-1.4650	0.1399			
153	70	August 22, 3114	20:29:10	Partial	71.1S 157.4W	-1.5304	0.0178			
