= April 1969 lunar eclipse =

Penumbral lunar eclipse April 2, 1969

- Penumbral eclipse
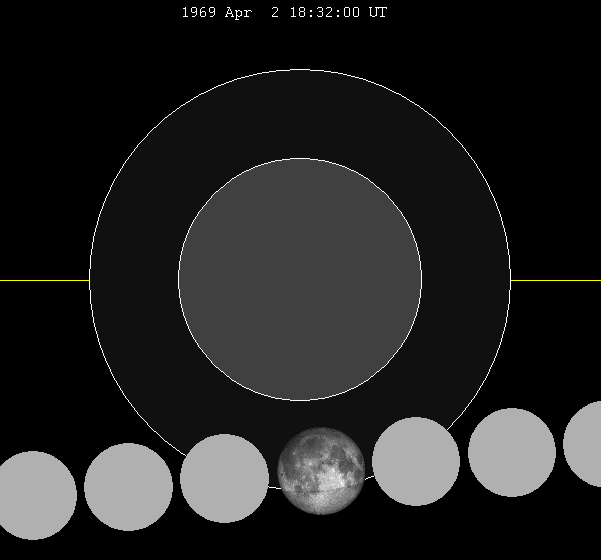
- The Moon's hourly motion shown right to left
- Date: April 2, 1969
- Gamma: −1.1765
- Magnitude: −0.3046
- Saros cycle: 141 (21 of 73)
- Penumbral: 223 minutes, 41 seconds
Contacts (UTC)
- P1: 16:40:41
- Greatest: 18:32:27
- P4: 20:24:22

A penumbral lunar eclipse occurred at the Moon’s descending node of orbit on Wednesday, April 2, 1969, with an umbral magnitude of −0.3046. A lunar eclipse occurs when the Moon moves into the Earth's shadow, causing the Moon to be darkened. A penumbral lunar eclipse occurs when part or all of the Moon's near side passes into the Earth's penumbra. Unlike a solar eclipse, which can only be viewed from a relatively small area of the world, a lunar eclipse may be viewed from anywhere on the night side of Earth. Occurring about 4.2 days before perigee (on April 7, 1969, at 1:00 UTC), the Moon's apparent diameter was larger.

== Visibility ==
The eclipse was completely visible over east Africa, eastern Europe, Asia, Australia, and Antarctica, seen rising over western Europe and west Africa and setting over northeast Asia and the central Pacific Ocean.

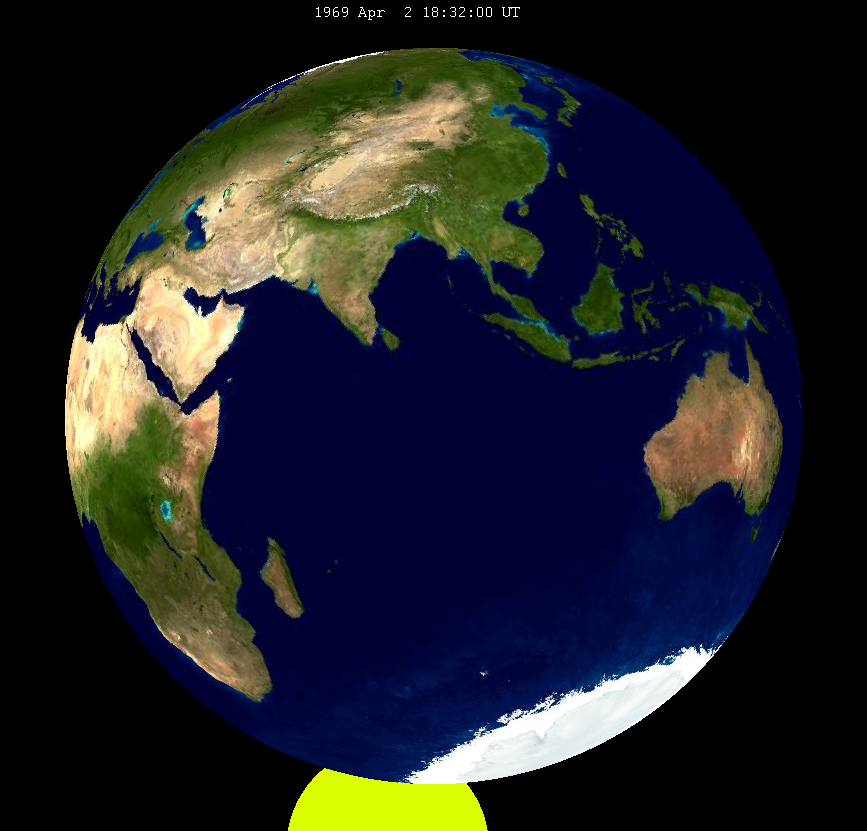
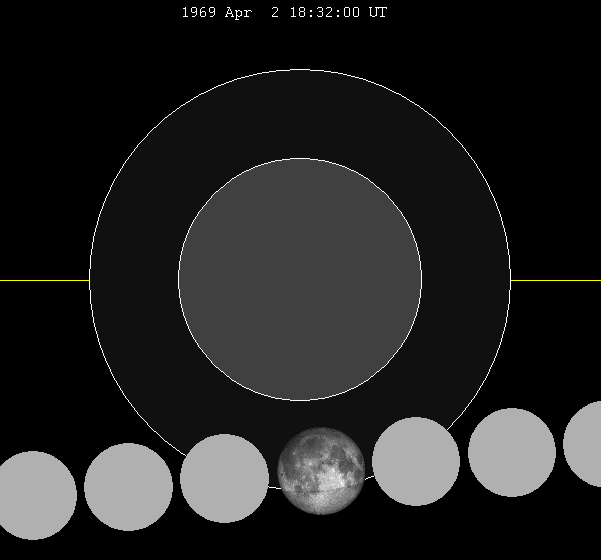

== Eclipse details ==
Shown below is a table displaying details about this particular lunar eclipse. It describes various parameters pertaining to this eclipse.

April 2, 1969 Lunar Eclipse Parameters
Parameter	Value
Penumbral Magnitude	0.70337
Umbral Magnitude	−0.30462
Gamma	−1.17648
Sun Right Ascension	00h47m14.1s
Sun Declination	+05°04'17.9"
Sun Semi-Diameter	15'59.8"
Sun Equatorial Horizontal Parallax	08.8"
Moon Right Ascension	12h45m02.7s
Moon Declination	-06°04'31.4"
Moon Semi-Diameter	15'52.2"
Moon Equatorial Horizontal Parallax	0°58'14.5"
ΔT	39.5 s

== Eclipse season ==
This eclipse is part of an eclipse season, a period, roughly every six months, when eclipses occur. Only two (or occasionally three) eclipse seasons occur each year, and each season lasts about 35 days and repeats just short of six months (173 days) later; thus two full eclipse seasons always occur each year. Either two or three eclipses happen each eclipse season. In the sequence below, each eclipse is separated by a fortnight.

Eclipse season of March–April 1969
March 18 Ascending node (new moon)	April 2 Descending node (full moon)
Annular solar eclipse Solar Saros 129	Penumbral lunar eclipse Lunar Saros 141

== Related eclipses ==
=== Eclipses in 1969 ===
- An annular solar eclipse on March 18.
- A penumbral lunar eclipse on April 2.
- A penumbral lunar eclipse on August 27.
- An annular solar eclipse on September 11.
- A penumbral lunar eclipse on September 25.

=== Metonic ===
- Preceded by: Lunar eclipse of June 14, 1965
- Followed by: Lunar eclipse of January 18, 1973

=== Tzolkinex ===
- Preceded by: Lunar eclipse of February 19, 1962
- Followed by: Lunar eclipse of May 13, 1976

=== Half-Saros ===
- Preceded by: Solar eclipse of March 27, 1960
- Followed by: Solar eclipse of April 7, 1978

=== Tritos ===
- Preceded by: Lunar eclipse of May 3, 1958
- Followed by: Lunar eclipse of March 1, 1980

=== Lunar Saros 141 ===
- Preceded by: Lunar eclipse of March 23, 1951
- Followed by: Lunar eclipse of April 14, 1987

=== Inex ===
- Preceded by: Lunar eclipse of April 22, 1940
- Followed by: Lunar eclipse of March 13, 1998

=== Triad ===
- Preceded by: Lunar eclipse of June 1, 1882
- Followed by: Lunar eclipse of February 1, 2056

=== Lunar eclipses of 1966–1969 ===
This eclipse is a member of a semester series. An eclipse in a semester series of lunar eclipses repeats approximately every 177 days and 4 hours (a semester) at alternating nodes of the Moon's orbit.

The penumbral lunar eclipse on August 27, 1969 occurs in the next lunar year eclipse set.

Lunar eclipse series sets from 1966 to 1969
Descending node				Ascending node			
Saros	Date Viewing	Type Chart	Gamma	Saros	Date Viewing	Type Chart	Gamma
111	1966 May 04	Penumbral	1.0554	116	1966 Oct 29	Penumbral	−1.0600
121	1967 Apr 24	Total	0.2972	126	1967 Oct 18	Total	−0.3653
131	1968 Apr 13	Total	−0.4173	136	1968 Oct 06	Total	0.3605
141	1969 Apr 02	Penumbral	−1.1765	146	1969 Sep 25	Penumbral	1.0656

=== Saros 141 ===
This eclipse is a part of Saros series 141, repeating every 18 years, 11 days, and containing 72 events. The series started with a penumbral lunar eclipse on August 25, 1608. It contains partial eclipses from May 16, 2041 through July 20, 2149; total eclipses from August 1, 2167 through May 1, 2618; and a second set of partial eclipses from May 12, 2636 through July 16, 2744. The series ends at member 72 as a penumbral eclipse on October 11, 2888.

The longest duration of totality will be produced by member 39 at 104 minutes, 36 seconds on October 16, 2293. All eclipses in this series occur at the Moon’s descending node of orbit.

Greatest	First			
The greatest eclipse of the series will occur on 2293 Oct 16, lasting 104 minutes, 36 seconds.	Penumbral	Partial	Total	Central
The greatest eclipse of the series will occur on 2293 Oct 16, lasting 104 minutes, 36 seconds.	1608 Aug 25	2041 May 16	2167 Aug 01	2221 Sep 02
The greatest eclipse of the series will occur on 2293 Oct 16, lasting 104 minutes, 36 seconds.	Last			
The greatest eclipse of the series will occur on 2293 Oct 16, lasting 104 minutes, 36 seconds.	Central	Total	Partial	Penumbral
The greatest eclipse of the series will occur on 2293 Oct 16, lasting 104 minutes, 36 seconds.	2546 Mar 18	2618 May 01	2744 Jul 16	2888 Oct 11

Eclipses are tabulated in three columns; every third eclipse in the same column is one exeligmos apart, so they all cast shadows over approximately the same parts of the Earth.

Series members 12–33 occur between 1801 and 2200:
12	13	14
1806 Dec 25	1825 Jan 04	1843 Jan 16
15	16	17
1861 Jan 26	1879 Feb 07	1897 Feb 17
18	19	20
1915 Mar 01	1933 Mar 12	1951 Mar 23
21	22	23
1969 Apr 02	1987 Apr 14	2005 Apr 24
24	25	26
2023 May 05	2041 May 16	2059 May 27
27	28	29
2077 Jun 06	2095 Jun 17	2113 Jun 29
30	31	32
2131 Jul 10	2149 Jul 20	2167 Aug 01
33
2185 Aug 11

=== Tritos series ===
This eclipse is a part of a tritos cycle, repeating at alternating nodes every 135 synodic months (≈ 3986.63 days, or 11 years minus 1 month). Their appearance and longitude are irregular due to a lack of synchronization with the anomalistic month (period of perigee), but groupings of 3 tritos cycles (≈ 33 years minus 3 months) come close (≈ 434.044 anomalistic months), so eclipses are similar in these groupings.

Series members between 1801 and 2132
1805 Jul 11 (Saros 126)	1816 Jun 10 (Saros 127)	1827 May 11 (Saros 128)	1838 Apr 10 (Saros 129)	1849 Mar 09 (Saros 130)
1860 Feb 07 (Saros 131)	1871 Jan 06 (Saros 132)	1881 Dec 05 (Saros 133)	1892 Nov 04 (Saros 134)	1903 Oct 06 (Saros 135)
1914 Sep 04 (Saros 136)	1925 Aug 04 (Saros 137)	1936 Jul 04 (Saros 138)	1947 Jun 03 (Saros 139)	1958 May 03 (Saros 140)
1969 Apr 02 (Saros 141)	1980 Mar 01 (Saros 142)	1991 Jan 30 (Saros 143)	2001 Dec 30 (Saros 144)	2012 Nov 28 (Saros 145)
2023 Oct 28 (Saros 146)	2034 Sep 28 (Saros 147)	2045 Aug 27 (Saros 148)	2056 Jul 26 (Saros 149)	2067 Jun 27 (Saros 150)
2132 Dec 22 (Saros 156)

=== Inex series ===
This eclipse is a part of the long period inex cycle, repeating at alternating nodes, every 358 synodic months (≈ 10,571.95 days, or 29 years minus 20 days). Their appearance and longitude are irregular due to a lack of synchronization with the anomalistic month (period of perigee). However, groupings of 3 inex cycles (≈ 87 years minus 2 months) comes close (≈ 1,151.02 anomalistic months), so eclipses are similar in these groupings.

Series members between 1801 and 2200
1824 Jul 11 (Saros 136)	1853 Jun 21 (Saros 137)	1882 Jun 01 (Saros 138)
1911 May 13 (Saros 139)	1940 Apr 22 (Saros 140)	1969 Apr 02 (Saros 141)
1998 Mar 13 (Saros 142)	2027 Feb 20 (Saros 143)	2056 Feb 01 (Saros 144)
2085 Jan 10 (Saros 145)	2113 Dec 22 (Saros 146)	2142 Dec 03 (Saros 147)
2171 Nov 12 (Saros 148)	2200 Oct 23 (Saros 149)	

=== Half-Saros cycle ===
A lunar eclipse will be preceded and followed by solar eclipses by 9 years and 5.5 days (a half saros). This lunar eclipse is related to two partial solar eclipses of Solar Saros 148.

March 27, 1960	April 7, 1978

== See also ==
- List of lunar eclipses
- List of 20th-century lunar eclipses
