= March 1951 lunar eclipse =

Penumbral lunar eclipse March 23, 1951

- Penumbral eclipse
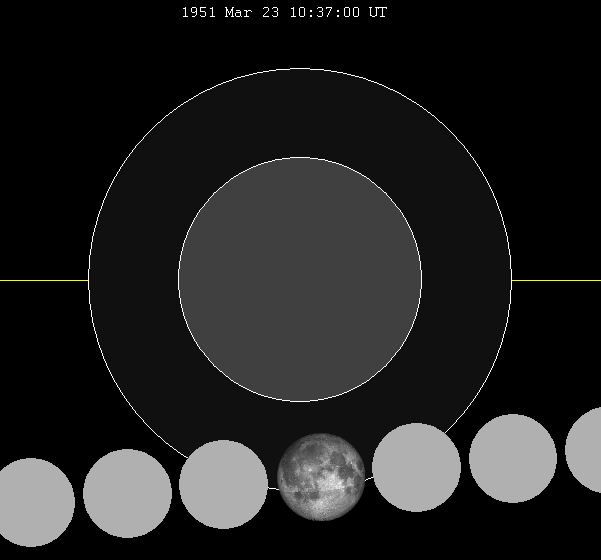
- The Moon's hourly motion shown right to left
- Date: March 23, 1951
- Gamma: −1.2099
- Magnitude: −0.3660
- Saros cycle: 141 (20 of 73)
- Penumbral: 214 minutes, 19 seconds
Contacts (UTC)
- P1: 8:50:00
- Greatest: 10:37:04
- P4: 12:24:19

A penumbral lunar eclipse occurred at the Moon's descending node of orbit on Friday, March 23, 1951, with an umbral magnitude of −0.3660. A lunar eclipse occurs when the Moon moves into the Earth's shadow, causing the Moon to be darkened. A penumbral lunar eclipse occurs when part or all of the Moon's near side passes into the Earth's penumbra. Unlike a solar eclipse, which can only be viewed from a relatively small area of the world, a lunar eclipse may be viewed from anywhere on the night side of Earth. Occurring about 3.9 days before perigee (on March 27, 1951, at 8:20 UTC), the Moon's apparent diameter was larger.

This eclipse was the second of four penumbral lunar eclipses in 1951, with the others occurring on February 21, August 17, and September 15.

== Visibility ==
The eclipse was completely visible over northeast Asia, eastern Australia, and western North America, seen rising over east and southeast Asia and western Australia and setting over eastern North America and South America.

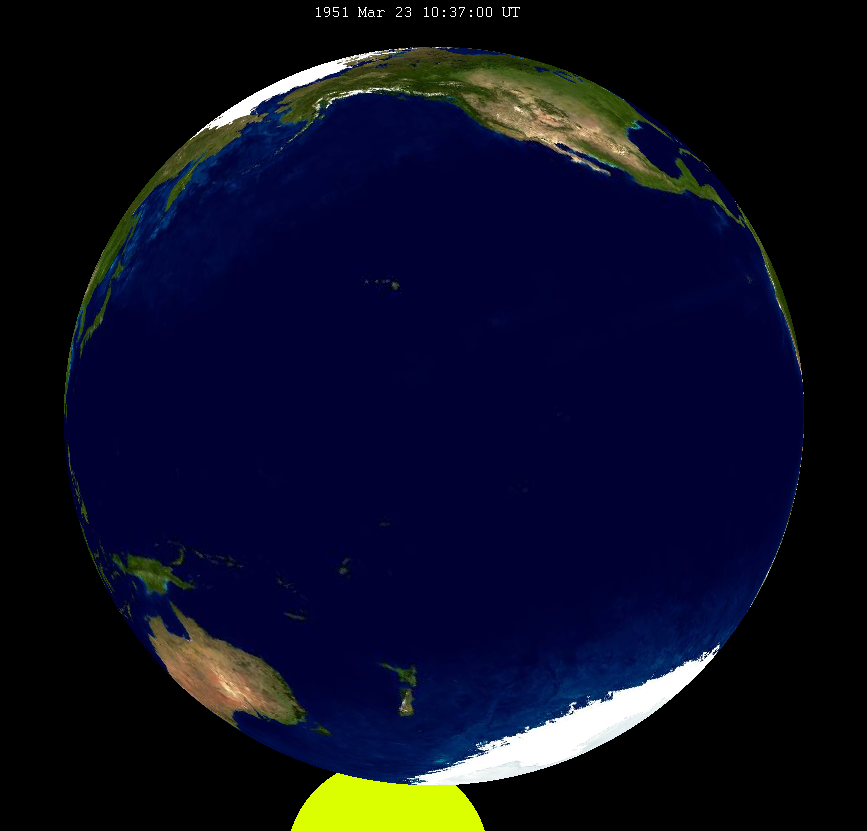
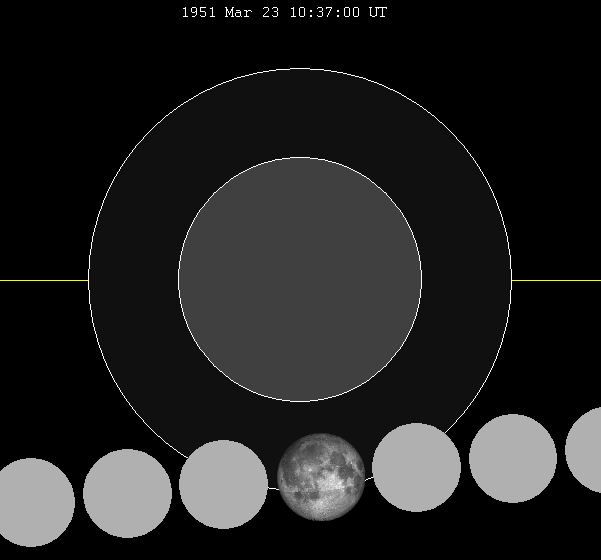

== Eclipse details ==
Shown below is a table displaying details about this particular solar eclipse. It describes various parameters pertaining to this eclipse.

March 23, 1951 Lunar Eclipse Parameters
Parameter	Value
Penumbral Magnitude	0.64195
Umbral Magnitude	−0.36599
Gamma	−1.20994
Sun Right Ascension	00h07m18.6s
Sun Declination	+00°47'32.7"
Sun Semi-Diameter	16'02.8"
Sun Equatorial Horizontal Parallax	08.8"
Moon Right Ascension	12h05m01.7s
Moon Declination	-01°49'23.5"
Moon Semi-Diameter	15'55.2"
Moon Equatorial Horizontal Parallax	0°58'25.6"
ΔT	29.6 s

== Eclipse season ==
This eclipse is part of an eclipse season, a period, roughly every six months, when eclipses occur. Only two (or occasionally three) eclipse seasons occur each year, and each season lasts about 35 days and repeats just short of six months (173 days) later; thus two full eclipse seasons always occur each year. Either two or three eclipses happen each eclipse season. In the sequence below, each eclipse is separated by a fortnight. The first and last eclipse in this sequence is separated by one synodic month.

Eclipse season of February–March 1951
February 21 Descending node (full moon)	March 7 Ascending node (new moon)	March 23 Descending node (full moon)
Penumbral lunar eclipse Lunar Saros 103	Annular solar eclipse Solar Saros 129	Penumbral lunar eclipse Lunar Saros 141

== Related eclipses ==
=== Eclipses in 1951 ===
- A penumbral lunar eclipse on February 21.
- An annular solar eclipse on March 7.
- A penumbral lunar eclipse on March 23.
- A penumbral lunar eclipse on August 17.
- An annular solar eclipse on September 1.
- A penumbral lunar eclipse on September 15.

=== Metonic ===
- Preceded by: Lunar eclipse of June 3, 1947
- Followed by: Lunar eclipse of January 8, 1955

=== Tzolkinex ===
- Preceded by: Lunar eclipse of February 9, 1944
- Followed by: Lunar eclipse of May 3, 1958

=== Half-Saros ===
- Preceded by: Solar eclipse of March 16, 1942
- Followed by: Solar eclipse of March 27, 1960

=== Tritos ===
- Preceded by: Lunar eclipse of April 22, 1940
- Followed by: Lunar eclipse of February 19, 1962

=== Lunar Saros 141 ===
- Preceded by: Lunar eclipse of March 12, 1933
- Followed by: Lunar eclipse of April 2, 1969

=== Inex ===
- Preceded by: Lunar eclipse of April 11, 1922
- Followed by: Lunar eclipse of March 1, 1980

=== Triad ===
- Preceded by: Lunar eclipse of May 21, 1864
- Followed by: Lunar eclipse of January 21, 2038

=== Lunar eclipses of 1948–1951 ===
This eclipse is a member of a semester series. An eclipse in a semester series of lunar eclipses repeats approximately every 177 days and 4 hours (a semester) at alternating nodes of the Moon's orbit.

The penumbral lunar eclipses on February 21, 1951 and August 17, 1951 occur in the next lunar year eclipse set.

Lunar eclipse series sets from 1948 to 1951
Descending node				Ascending node			
Saros	Date Viewing	Type Chart	Gamma	Saros	Date Viewing	Type Chart	Gamma
111	1948 Apr 23	Partial	1.0017	116	1948 Oct 18	Penumbral	−1.0245
121	1949 Apr 13	Total	0.2474	126	1949 Oct 07	Total	−0.3219
131	1950 Apr 02	Total	−0.4599	136	1950 Sep 26	Total	0.4101
141	1951 Mar 23	Penumbral	−1.2099	146	1951 Sep 15	Penumbral	1.1187

=== Saros 141 ===
This eclipse is a part of Saros series 141, repeating every 18 years, 11 days, and containing 72 events. The series started with a penumbral lunar eclipse on August 25, 1608. It contains partial eclipses from May 16, 2041 through July 20, 2149; total eclipses from August 1, 2167 through May 1, 2618; and a second set of partial eclipses from May 12, 2636 through July 16, 2744. The series ends at member 72 as a penumbral eclipse on October 11, 2888.

The longest duration of totality will be produced by member 39 at 104 minutes, 36 seconds on October 16, 2293. All eclipses in this series occur at the Moon’s descending node of orbit.

Greatest	First			
The greatest eclipse of the series will occur on 2293 Oct 16, lasting 104 minutes, 36 seconds.	Penumbral	Partial	Total	Central
The greatest eclipse of the series will occur on 2293 Oct 16, lasting 104 minutes, 36 seconds.	1608 Aug 25	2041 May 16	2167 Aug 01	2221 Sep 02
The greatest eclipse of the series will occur on 2293 Oct 16, lasting 104 minutes, 36 seconds.	Last			
The greatest eclipse of the series will occur on 2293 Oct 16, lasting 104 minutes, 36 seconds.	Central	Total	Partial	Penumbral
The greatest eclipse of the series will occur on 2293 Oct 16, lasting 104 minutes, 36 seconds.	2546 Mar 18	2618 May 01	2744 Jul 16	2888 Oct 11

Eclipses are tabulated in three columns; every third eclipse in the same column is one exeligmos apart, so they all cast shadows over approximately the same parts of the Earth.

Series members 12–33 occur between 1801 and 2200:
12	13	14
1806 Dec 25	1825 Jan 04	1843 Jan 16
15	16	17
1861 Jan 26	1879 Feb 07	1897 Feb 17
18	19	20
1915 Mar 01	1933 Mar 12	1951 Mar 23
21	22	23
1969 Apr 02	1987 Apr 14	2005 Apr 24
24	25	26
2023 May 05	2041 May 16	2059 May 27
27	28	29
2077 Jun 06	2095 Jun 17	2113 Jun 29
30	31	32
2131 Jul 10	2149 Jul 20	2167 Aug 01
33
2185 Aug 11

=== Tritos series ===
This eclipse is a part of a tritos cycle, repeating at alternating nodes every 135 synodic months (≈ 3986.63 days, or 11 years minus 1 month). Their appearance and longitude are irregular due to a lack of synchronization with the anomalistic month (period of perigee), but groupings of 3 tritos cycles (≈ 33 years minus 3 months) come close (≈ 434.044 anomalistic months), so eclipses are similar in these groupings.

Series members between 1801 and 2147
1809 Apr 30 (Saros 128)	1820 Mar 29 (Saros 129)	1831 Feb 26 (Saros 130)	1842 Jan 26 (Saros 131)	1852 Dec 26 (Saros 132)
1863 Nov 25 (Saros 133)	1874 Oct 25 (Saros 134)	1885 Sep 24 (Saros 135)	1896 Aug 23 (Saros 136)	1907 Jul 25 (Saros 137)
1918 Jun 24 (Saros 138)	1929 May 23 (Saros 139)	1940 Apr 22 (Saros 140)	1951 Mar 23 (Saros 141)	1962 Feb 19 (Saros 142)
1973 Jan 18 (Saros 143)	1983 Dec 20 (Saros 144)	1994 Nov 18 (Saros 145)	2005 Oct 17 (Saros 146)	2016 Sep 16 (Saros 147)
2027 Aug 17 (Saros 148)	2038 Jul 16 (Saros 149)	2049 Jun 15 (Saros 150)		
			2114 Dec 12 (Saros 156)	
	2147 Sep 09 (Saros 159)			

=== Inex series ===
This eclipse is a part of the long period inex cycle, repeating at alternating nodes, every 358 synodic months (≈ 10,571.95 days, or 29 years minus 20 days). Their appearance and longitude are irregular due to a lack of synchronization with the anomalistic month (period of perigee). However, groupings of 3 inex cycles (≈ 87 years minus 2 months) comes close (≈ 1,151.02 anomalistic months), so eclipses are similar in these groupings.

Series members between 1801 and 2200
1806 Jun 30 (Saros 136)	1835 Jun 10 (Saros 137)	1864 May 21 (Saros 138)
1893 Apr 30 (Saros 139)	1922 Apr 11 (Saros 140)	1951 Mar 23 (Saros 141)
1980 Mar 01 (Saros 142)	2009 Feb 09 (Saros 143)	2038 Jan 21 (Saros 144)
2066 Dec 31 (Saros 145)	2095 Dec 11 (Saros 146)	2124 Nov 21 (Saros 147)
2153 Nov 01 (Saros 148)	2182 Oct 11 (Saros 149)	

=== Half-Saros cycle ===
A lunar eclipse will be preceded and followed by solar eclipses by 9 years and 5.5 days (a half saros). This lunar eclipse is related to two total solar eclipses of Solar Saros 148.

March 16, 1942	March 27, 1960

== See also ==
- List of lunar eclipses
- List of 20th-century lunar eclipses
