= May 2041 lunar eclipse =

Astronomical event

- Partial eclipse
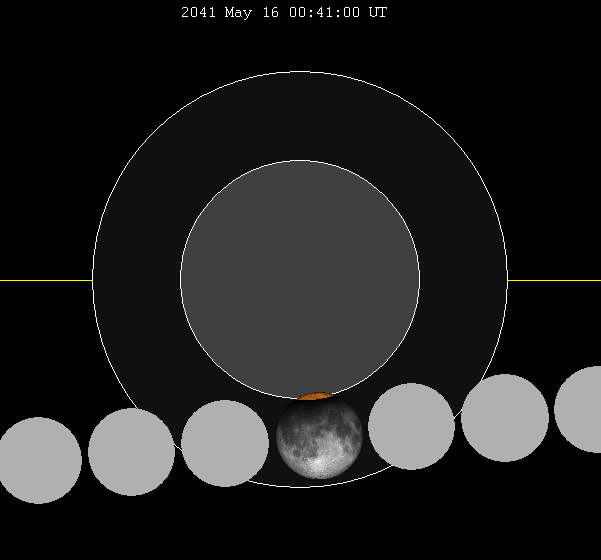
- The Moon's hourly motion shown right to left
- Date: May 15–16, 2041
- Gamma: −0.9746
- Magnitude: 0.0663
- Saros cycle: 141 (25 of 72)
- Partiality: 58 minutes, 27 seconds
- Penumbral: 269 minutes, 44 seconds
Contacts (UTC)
- P1: 22:26:48
- U1: 0:12:30
- Greatest: 0:41:37
- U4: 1:10:57
- P4: 2:56:32

A partial lunar eclipse will occur at the Moon’s descending node of orbit on Wednesday, May 15 and Thursday, May 16, 2041, with an umbral magnitude of 0.0663. A lunar eclipse occurs when the Moon moves into the Earth's shadow, causing the Moon to be darkened. A partial lunar eclipse occurs when one part of the Moon is in the Earth's umbra, while the other part is in the Earth's penumbra. Unlike a solar eclipse, which can only be viewed from a relatively small area of the world, a lunar eclipse may be viewed from anywhere on the night side of Earth. Occurring about 5.8 days before perigee (on May 21, 2041, at 21:20 UTC), the Moon's apparent diameter will be larger.

== Visibility ==
The eclipse will be completely visible over South America, Europe, and Africa, seen rising over much of North America and setting over west, central, and South Asia.

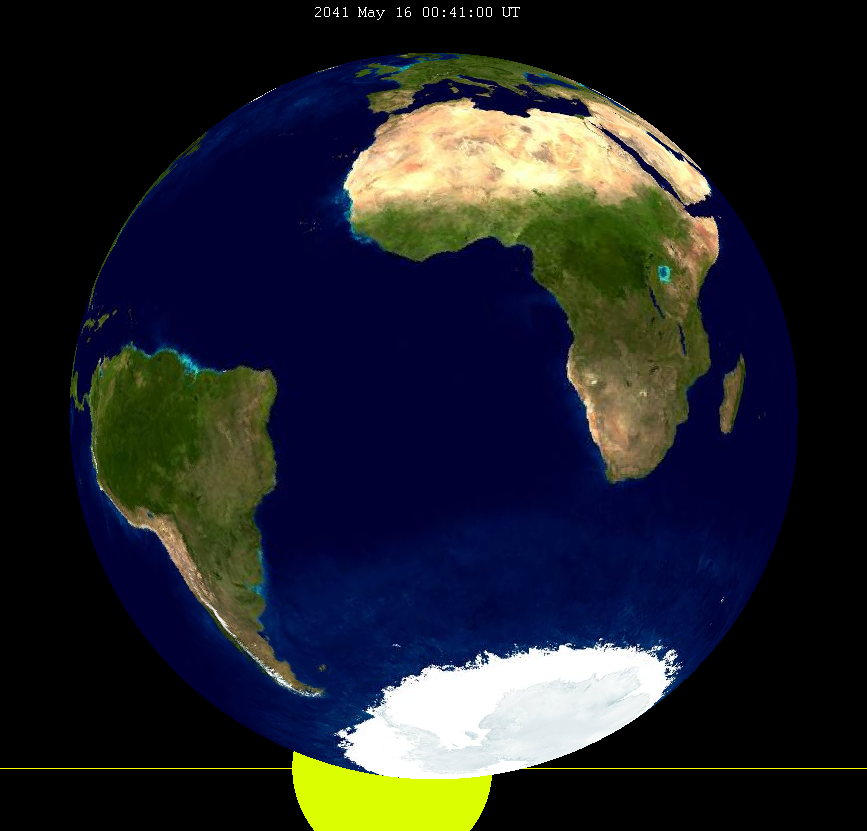
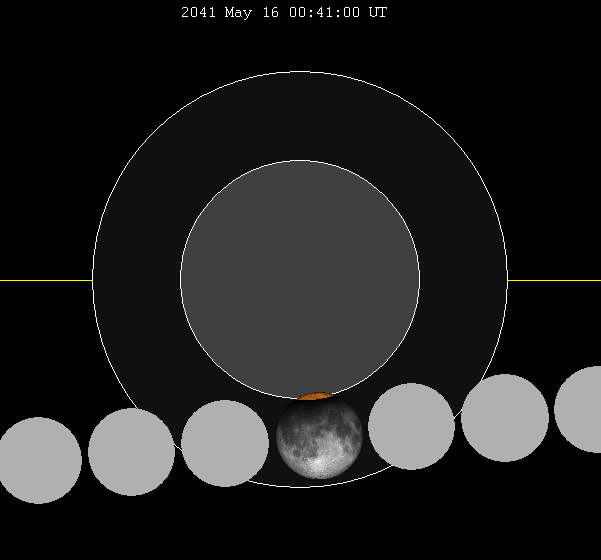

== Eclipse details ==
Shown below is a table displaying details about this particular eclipse. It describes various parameters pertaining to this eclipse.

May 15–16, 2041 Lunar Eclipse Parameters
Parameter	Value
Penumbral Magnitude	1.07651
Umbral Magnitude	0.06627
Gamma	−0.97468
Sun Right Ascension	03h32m49.6s
Sun Declination	+19°08'35.5"
Sun Semi-Diameter	15'49.2"
Sun Equatorial Horizontal Parallax	08.7"
Moon Right Ascension	15h31m30.5s
Moon Declination	-20°01'25.1"
Moon Semi-Diameter	15'39.6"
Moon Equatorial Horizontal Parallax	0°57'28.4"
ΔT	79.9 s

== Eclipse season ==
This eclipse is part of an eclipse season, a period, roughly every six months, when eclipses occur. Only two (or occasionally three) eclipse seasons occur each year, and each season lasts about 35 days and repeats just short of six months (173 days) later; thus two full eclipse seasons always occur each year. Either two or three eclipses happen each eclipse season. In the sequence below, each eclipse is separated by a fortnight.

Eclipse season of April–May 2041
April 30 Ascending node (new moon)	May 15–16 Descending node (full moon)
Total solar eclipse Solar Saros 129	Partial lunar eclipse Lunar Saros 141

== Related eclipses ==
=== Eclipses in 2041 ===
- A total solar eclipse on April 30.
- A partial lunar eclipse on May 15–16.
- An annular solar eclipse on October 25.
- A partial lunar eclipse on November 8.

=== Metonic ===
- Preceded by: Lunar eclipse of July 27, 2037
- Followed by: Lunar eclipse of March 3, 2045

=== Tzolkinex ===
- Preceded by: Lunar eclipse of April 3, 2034
- Followed by: Lunar eclipse of June 25–26, 2048

=== Half-Saros ===
- Preceded by: Solar eclipse of May 9, 2032
- Followed by: Solar eclipse of May 20, 2050

=== Tritos ===
- Preceded by: Lunar eclipse of June 15, 2030
- Followed by: Lunar eclipse of April 14, 2052

=== Lunar Saros 141 ===
- Preceded by: Lunar eclipse of May 5, 2023
- Followed by: Lunar eclipse of May 27, 2059

=== Inex ===
- Preceded by: Lunar eclipse of June 4, 2012
- Followed by: Lunar eclipse of April 25, 2070

=== Triad ===
- Preceded by: Lunar eclipse of July 16, 1954
- Followed by: Lunar eclipse of March 16, 2128

=== Lunar eclipses of 2038–2042 ===
This eclipse is a member of a semester series. An eclipse in a semester series of lunar eclipses repeats approximately every 177 days and 4 hours (a semester) at alternating nodes of the Moon's orbit.

The penumbral lunar eclipses on January 21, 2038 and July 16, 2038 occur in the previous lunar year eclipse set, and the penumbral lunar eclipses on April 5, 2042 and September 29, 2042 occur in the next lunar year eclipse set.

Lunar eclipse series sets from 2038 to 2042
Descending node				Ascending node			
Saros	Date Viewing	Type Chart	Gamma	Saros	Date Viewing	Type Chart	Gamma
111	2038 Jun 17	Penumbral	1.3082	116	2038 Dec 11	Penumbral	−1.1448
121	2039 Jun 06	Partial	0.5460	126	2039 Nov 30	Partial	−0.4721
131	2040 May 26	Total	−0.1872	136	2040 Nov 18	Total	0.2361
141	2041 May 16	Partial	−0.9746	146	2041 Nov 08	Partial	0.9212
				156	2042 Oct 28	Penumbral	−

=== Metonic series ===
The Metonic cycle repeats nearly exactly every 19 years and represents a Saros cycle plus one lunar year. Because it occurs on the same calendar date, the Earth's shadow will be in nearly the same location relative to the background stars.

1. 1984 May 15.19 - penumbral (111); 2. 2003 May 16.15 - total (121); 3. 2022 May 16.17 - total (131); 4. 2041 May 16.03 - penumbral (141)	1. 1984 Nov 08.75 - penumbral (116); 2. 2003 Nov 09.05 - total (126); 3. 2022 Nov 08.46 - total (136); 4. 2041 Nov 08.19 - partial (146); 5. 2060 Nov 08.17 - penumbral (156)

=== Saros 141 ===
This eclipse is a part of Saros series 141, repeating every 18 years, 11 days, and containing 72 events. The series started with a penumbral lunar eclipse on August 25, 1608. It contains partial eclipses from May 16, 2041 through July 20, 2149; total eclipses from August 1, 2167 through May 1, 2618; and a second set of partial eclipses from May 12, 2636 through July 16, 2744. The series ends at member 72 as a penumbral eclipse on October 11, 2888.

The longest duration of totality will be produced by member 39 at 104 minutes, 36 seconds on October 16, 2293. All eclipses in this series occur at the Moon’s descending node of orbit.

Greatest	First			
The greatest eclipse of the series will occur on 2293 Oct 16, lasting 104 minutes, 36 seconds.	Penumbral	Partial	Total	Central
The greatest eclipse of the series will occur on 2293 Oct 16, lasting 104 minutes, 36 seconds.	1608 Aug 25	2041 May 16	2167 Aug 01	2221 Sep 02
The greatest eclipse of the series will occur on 2293 Oct 16, lasting 104 minutes, 36 seconds.	Last			
The greatest eclipse of the series will occur on 2293 Oct 16, lasting 104 minutes, 36 seconds.	Central	Total	Partial	Penumbral
The greatest eclipse of the series will occur on 2293 Oct 16, lasting 104 minutes, 36 seconds.	2546 Mar 18	2618 May 01	2744 Jul 16	2888 Oct 11

Eclipses are tabulated in three columns; every third eclipse in the same column is one exeligmos apart, so they all cast shadows over approximately the same parts of the Earth.

Series members 12–33 occur between 1801 and 2200:
12	13	14
1806 Dec 25	1825 Jan 04	1843 Jan 16
15	16	17
1861 Jan 26	1879 Feb 07	1897 Feb 17
18	19	20
1915 Mar 01	1933 Mar 12	1951 Mar 23
21	22	23
1969 Apr 02	1987 Apr 14	2005 Apr 24
24	25	26
2023 May 05	2041 May 16	2059 May 27
27	28	29
2077 Jun 06	2095 Jun 17	2113 Jun 29
30	31	32
2131 Jul 10	2149 Jul 20	2167 Aug 01
33
2185 Aug 11

=== Tritos series ===
This eclipse is a part of a tritos cycle, repeating at alternating nodes every 135 synodic months (≈ 3986.63 days, or 11 years minus 1 month). Their appearance and longitude are irregular due to a lack of synchronization with the anomalistic month (period of perigee), but groupings of 3 tritos cycles (≈ 33 years minus 3 months) come close (≈ 434.044 anomalistic months), so eclipses are similar in these groupings.

Series members between 1801 and 2200
1801 Mar 30 (Saros 119)	1812 Feb 27 (Saros 120)	1823 Jan 26 (Saros 121)	1833 Dec 26 (Saros 122)	1844 Nov 24 (Saros 123)
1855 Oct 25 (Saros 124)	1866 Sep 24 (Saros 125)	1877 Aug 23 (Saros 126)	1888 Jul 23 (Saros 127)	1899 Jun 23 (Saros 128)
1910 May 24 (Saros 129)	1921 Apr 22 (Saros 130)	1932 Mar 22 (Saros 131)	1943 Feb 20 (Saros 132)	1954 Jan 19 (Saros 133)
1964 Dec 19 (Saros 134)	1975 Nov 18 (Saros 135)	1986 Oct 17 (Saros 136)	1997 Sep 16 (Saros 137)	2008 Aug 16 (Saros 138)
2019 Jul 16 (Saros 139)	2030 Jun 15 (Saros 140)	2041 May 16 (Saros 141)	2052 Apr 14 (Saros 142)	2063 Mar 14 (Saros 143)
2074 Feb 11 (Saros 144)	2085 Jan 10 (Saros 145)	2095 Dec 11 (Saros 146)	2106 Nov 11 (Saros 147)	2117 Oct 10 (Saros 148)
2128 Sep 09 (Saros 149)	2139 Aug 10 (Saros 150)	2150 Jul 09 (Saros 151)	2161 Jun 08 (Saros 152)	2172 May 08 (Saros 153)
	2194 Mar 07 (Saros 155)			

=== Inex series ===
This eclipse is a part of the long period inex cycle, repeating at alternating nodes, every 358 synodic months (≈ 10,571.95 days, or 29 years minus 20 days). Their appearance and longitude are irregular due to a lack of synchronization with the anomalistic month (period of perigee). However, groupings of 3 inex cycles (≈ 87 years minus 2 months) comes close (≈ 1,151.02 anomalistic months), so eclipses are similar in these groupings.

Series members between 1801 and 2200
1809 Oct 23 (Saros 133)	1838 Oct 03 (Saros 134)	1867 Sep 14 (Saros 135)
1896 Aug 23 (Saros 136)	1925 Aug 04 (Saros 137)	1954 Jul 16 (Saros 138)
1983 Jun 25 (Saros 139)	2012 Jun 04 (Saros 140)	2041 May 16 (Saros 141)
2070 Apr 25 (Saros 142)	2099 Apr 05 (Saros 143)	2128 Mar 16 (Saros 144)
2157 Feb 24 (Saros 145)	2186 Feb 04 (Saros 146)	

=== Half-Saros cycle ===
A lunar eclipse will be preceded and followed by solar eclipses by 9 years and 5.5 days (a half saros). This lunar eclipse is related to two annular solar eclipses of Solar Saros 148.

May 9, 2032	May 20, 2050

== See also ==
- List of lunar eclipses and List of 21st-century lunar eclipses
