= April 1987 lunar eclipse =

Penumbral lunar eclipse April 14, 1987

- Penumbral eclipse
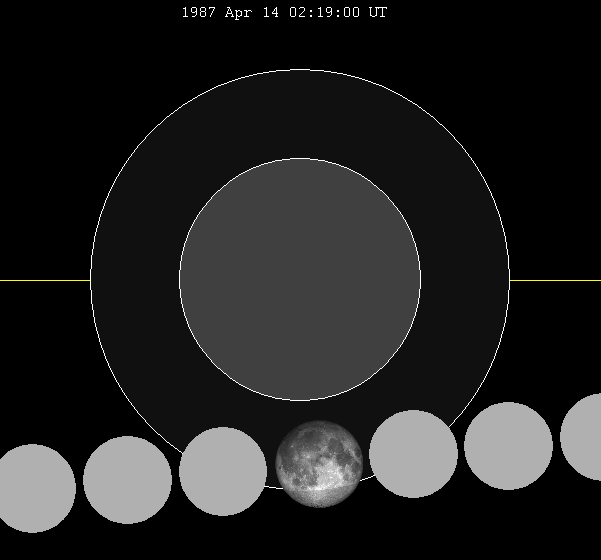
- The Moon's hourly motion shown right to left
- Date: April 14, 1987
- Gamma: −1.1364
- Magnitude: −0.2312
- Saros cycle: 141 (22 of 73)
- Penumbral: 234 minutes, 8 seconds
Contacts (UTC)
- P1: 0:21:55
- Greatest: 2:18:54
- P4: 4:16:03

A penumbral lunar eclipse occurred at the Moon’s descending node of orbit on Tuesday, April 14, 1987, with an umbral magnitude of −0.2312. A lunar eclipse occurs when the Moon moves into the Earth's shadow, causing the Moon to be darkened. A penumbral lunar eclipse occurs when part or all of the Moon's near side passes into the Earth's penumbra. Unlike a solar eclipse, which can only be viewed from a relatively small area of the world, a lunar eclipse may be viewed from anywhere on the night side of Earth. Occurring about 4.6 days before perigee (on April 18, 1987, at 17:35 UTC), the Moon's apparent diameter was larger.

== Visibility ==
The eclipse was completely visible over eastern North America, South America, western Europe, west and central Africa, and Antarctica, seen rising over western and central North America and the eastern Pacific Ocean and setting over east Africa, eastern Europe, and west, central, and south Asia.

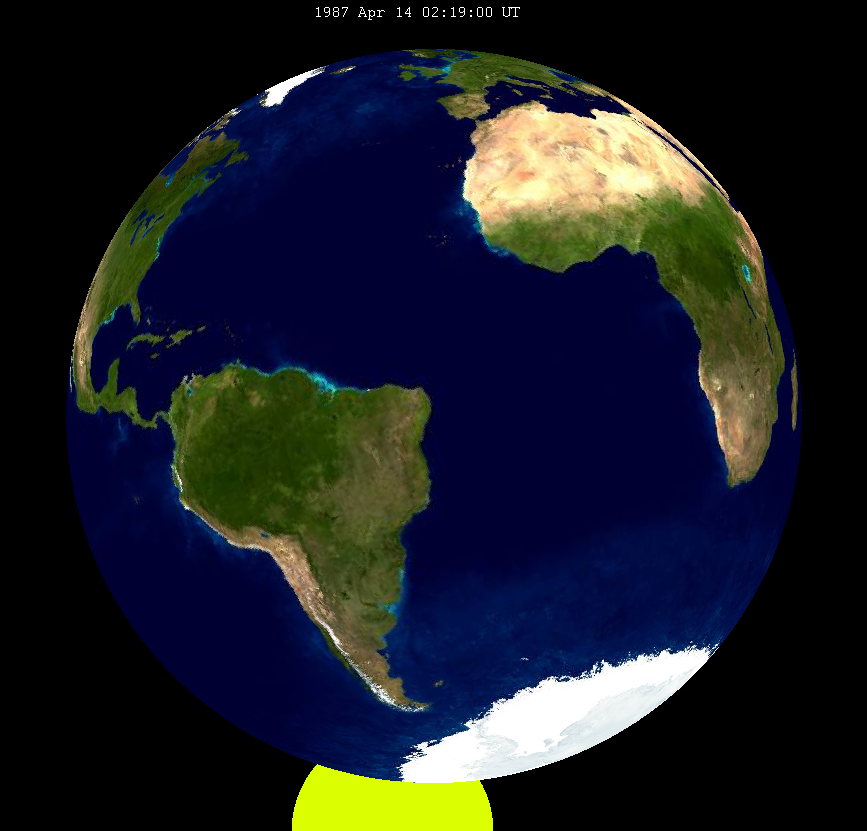
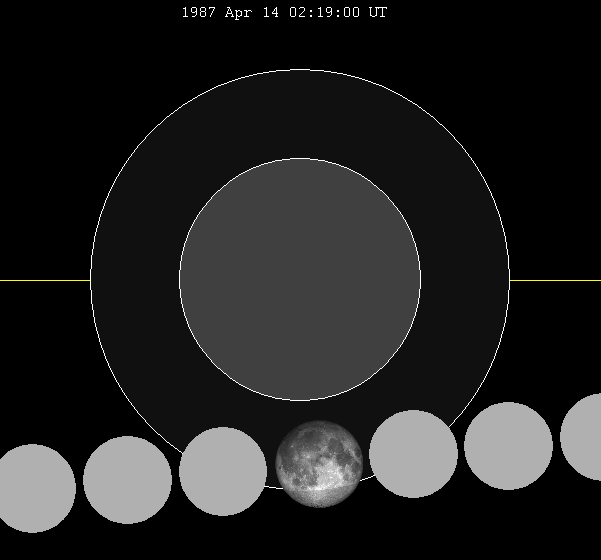

== Eclipse details ==
Shown below is a table displaying details about this particular solar eclipse. It describes various parameters pertaining to this eclipse.

April 14, 1987 Lunar Eclipse Parameters
Parameter	Value
Penumbral Magnitude	0.77703
Umbral Magnitude	−0.23122
Gamma	−1.13641
Sun Right Ascension	01h27m26.1s
Sun Declination	+09°10'16.8"
Sun Semi-Diameter	15'56.9"
Sun Equatorial Horizontal Parallax	08.8"
Moon Right Ascension	13h25m23.5s
Moon Declination	-10°08'55.4"
Moon Semi-Diameter	15'49.1"
Moon Equatorial Horizontal Parallax	0°58'03.2"
ΔT	55.4 s

== Eclipse season ==
This eclipse is part of an eclipse season, a period, roughly every six months, when eclipses occur. Only two (or occasionally three) eclipse seasons occur each year, and each season lasts about 35 days and repeats just short of six months (173 days) later; thus two full eclipse seasons always occur each year. Either two or three eclipses happen each eclipse season. In the sequence below, each eclipse is separated by a fortnight.

Eclipse season of March–April 1987
March 29 Ascending node (new moon)	April 14 Descending node (full moon)
Hybrid solar eclipse Solar Saros 129	Penumbral lunar eclipse Lunar Saros 141

== Related eclipses ==
=== Eclipses in 1987 ===
- A hybrid solar eclipse on March 29.
- A penumbral lunar eclipse on April 14.
- An annular solar eclipse on September 23.
- A penumbral lunar eclipse on October 7.

=== Metonic ===
- Preceded by: Lunar eclipse of June 25, 1983
- Followed by: Lunar eclipse of January 30, 1991

=== Tzolkinex ===
- Preceded by: Lunar eclipse of March 1, 1980
- Followed by: Lunar eclipse of May 25, 1994

=== Half-Saros ===
- Preceded by: Solar eclipse of April 7, 1978
- Followed by: Solar eclipse of April 17, 1996

=== Tritos ===
- Preceded by: Lunar eclipse of May 13, 1976
- Followed by: Lunar eclipse of March 13, 1998

=== Lunar Saros 141 ===
- Preceded by: Lunar eclipse of April 2, 1969
- Followed by: Lunar eclipse of April 24, 2005

=== Inex ===
- Preceded by: Lunar eclipse of May 3, 1958
- Followed by: Lunar eclipse of March 23, 2016

=== Triad ===
- Preceded by: Lunar eclipse of June 13, 1900
- Followed by: Lunar eclipse of February 11, 2074

=== Lunar eclipses of 1984–1987 ===
This eclipse is a member of a semester series. An eclipse in a semester series of lunar eclipses repeats approximately every 177 days and 4 hours (a semester) at alternating nodes of the Moon's orbit.

The penumbral lunar eclipse on June 13, 1984 occurs in the previous lunar year eclipse set.

Lunar eclipse series sets from 1984 to 1987
Descending node				Ascending node			
Saros	Date Viewing	Type Chart	Gamma	Saros	Date Viewing	Type Chart	Gamma
111	1984 May 15	Penumbral	1.1131	116	1984 Nov 08	Penumbral	−1.0900
121	1985 May 04	Total	0.3520	126	1985 Oct 28	Total	−0.4022
131	1986 Apr 24	Total	−0.3683	136	1986 Oct 17	Total	0.3189
141	1987 Apr 14	Penumbral	−1.1364	146	1987 Oct 07	Penumbral	1.0189

=== Saros 141 ===
This eclipse is a part of Saros series 141, repeating every 18 years, 11 days, and containing 72 events. The series started with a penumbral lunar eclipse on August 25, 1608. It contains partial eclipses from May 16, 2041 through July 20, 2149; total eclipses from August 1, 2167 through May 1, 2618; and a second set of partial eclipses from May 12, 2636 through July 16, 2744. The series ends at member 72 as a penumbral eclipse on October 11, 2888.

The longest duration of totality will be produced by member 39 at 104 minutes, 36 seconds on October 16, 2293. All eclipses in this series occur at the Moon’s descending node of orbit.

Greatest	First			
The greatest eclipse of the series will occur on 2293 Oct 16, lasting 104 minutes, 36 seconds.	Penumbral	Partial	Total	Central
The greatest eclipse of the series will occur on 2293 Oct 16, lasting 104 minutes, 36 seconds.	1608 Aug 25	2041 May 16	2167 Aug 01	2221 Sep 02
The greatest eclipse of the series will occur on 2293 Oct 16, lasting 104 minutes, 36 seconds.	Last			
The greatest eclipse of the series will occur on 2293 Oct 16, lasting 104 minutes, 36 seconds.	Central	Total	Partial	Penumbral
The greatest eclipse of the series will occur on 2293 Oct 16, lasting 104 minutes, 36 seconds.	2546 Mar 18	2618 May 01	2744 Jul 16	2888 Oct 11

Eclipses are tabulated in three columns; every third eclipse in the same column is one exeligmos apart, so they all cast shadows over approximately the same parts of the Earth.

Series members 12–33 occur between 1801 and 2200:
12	13	14
1806 Dec 25	1825 Jan 04	1843 Jan 16
15	16	17
1861 Jan 26	1879 Feb 07	1897 Feb 17
18	19	20
1915 Mar 01	1933 Mar 12	1951 Mar 23
21	22	23
1969 Apr 02	1987 Apr 14	2005 Apr 24
24	25	26
2023 May 05	2041 May 16	2059 May 27
27	28	29
2077 Jun 06	2095 Jun 17	2113 Jun 29
30	31	32
2131 Jul 10	2149 Jul 20	2167 Aug 01
33
2185 Aug 11

=== Tritos series ===
This eclipse is a part of a tritos cycle, repeating at alternating nodes every 135 synodic months (≈ 3986.63 days, or 11 years minus 1 month). Their appearance and longitude are irregular due to a lack of synchronization with the anomalistic month (period of perigee), but groupings of 3 tritos cycles (≈ 33 years minus 3 months) come close (≈ 434.044 anomalistic months), so eclipses are similar in these groupings.

Series members between 1801 and 2183
1801 Sep 22 (Saros 124)	1812 Aug 22 (Saros 125)	1823 Jul 23 (Saros 126)	1834 Jun 21 (Saros 127)	1845 May 21 (Saros 128)
1856 Apr 20 (Saros 129)	1867 Mar 20 (Saros 130)	1878 Feb 17 (Saros 131)	1889 Jan 17 (Saros 132)	1899 Dec 17 (Saros 133)
1910 Nov 17 (Saros 134)	1921 Oct 16 (Saros 135)	1932 Sep 14 (Saros 136)	1943 Aug 15 (Saros 137)	1954 Jul 16 (Saros 138)
1965 Jun 14 (Saros 139)	1976 May 13 (Saros 140)	1987 Apr 14 (Saros 141)	1998 Mar 13 (Saros 142)	2009 Feb 09 (Saros 143)
2020 Jan 10 (Saros 144)	2030 Dec 09 (Saros 145)	2041 Nov 08 (Saros 146)	2052 Oct 08 (Saros 147)	2063 Sep 07 (Saros 148)
2074 Aug 07 (Saros 149)	2085 Jul 07 (Saros 150)	2096 Jun 06 (Saros 151)	2107 May 07 (Saros 152)	
		2151 Jan 02 (Saros 156)		2172 Oct 31 (Saros 158)
2183 Oct 01 (Saros 159)

=== Inex series ===
This eclipse is a part of the long period inex cycle, repeating at alternating nodes, every 358 synodic months (≈ 10,571.95 days, or 29 years minus 20 days). Their appearance and longitude are irregular due to a lack of synchronization with the anomalistic month (period of perigee). However, groupings of 3 inex cycles (≈ 87 years minus 2 months) comes close (≈ 1,151.02 anomalistic months), so eclipses are similar in these groupings.

Series members between 1801 and 2200
1813 Aug 12 (Saros 135)	1842 Jul 22 (Saros 136)	1871 Jul 02 (Saros 137)
1900 Jun 13 (Saros 138)	1929 May 23 (Saros 139)	1958 May 03 (Saros 140)
1987 Apr 14 (Saros 141)	2016 Mar 23 (Saros 142)	2045 Mar 03 (Saros 143)
2074 Feb 11 (Saros 144)	2103 Jan 23 (Saros 145)	2132 Jan 02 (Saros 146)
2160 Dec 13 (Saros 147)	2189 Nov 22 (Saros 148)	

=== Half-Saros cycle ===
A lunar eclipse will be preceded and followed by solar eclipses by 9 years and 5.5 days (a half saros). This lunar eclipse is related to two partial solar eclipses of Solar Saros 148.

April 7, 1978	April 17, 1996

== See also ==
- List of lunar eclipses
- List of 20th-century lunar eclipses
