= April 2005 lunar eclipse =

Penumbral lunar eclipse 24 April 2005

- Penumbral eclipse
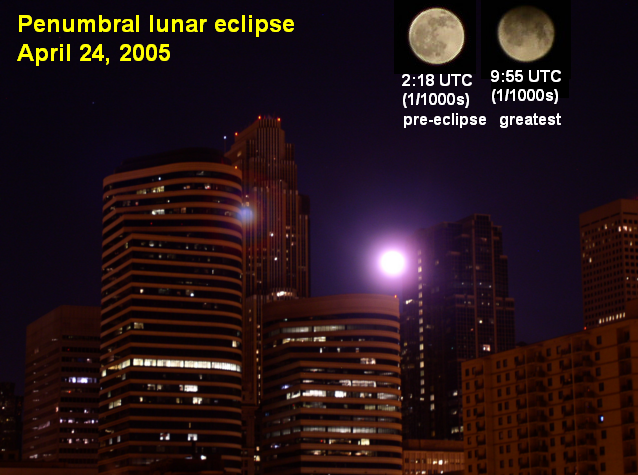
- From Minneapolis, Minnesota, with inset images of a full moon a few hours before the eclipse, and the setting moon at 9:55 UT near greatest eclipse.
- Date: April 24, 2005
- Gamma: −1.0885
- Magnitude: −0.1417
- Saros cycle: 141 (23 of 73)
- Penumbral: 245 minutes, 38 seconds
Contacts (UTC)
- P1: 7:52:06
- Greatest: 9:54:51
- P4: 11:57:44

A penumbral lunar eclipse occurred at the Moon’s descending node of orbit on Sunday, April 24, 2005, with an umbral magnitude of −0.1417. A lunar eclipse occurs when the Moon moves into the Earth's shadow, causing the Moon to be darkened. A penumbral lunar eclipse occurs when part or all of the Moon's near side passes into the Earth's penumbra. Unlike a solar eclipse, which can only be viewed from a relatively small area of the world, a lunar eclipse may be viewed from anywhere on the night side of Earth. Occurring about 4.9 days before perigee (on April 29, 2005, at 6:10 UTC), the Moon's apparent diameter was larger.

== Visibility ==
The eclipse was completely visible much of western North America, the Pacific Ocean, and eastern Australia, seen rising over Australia and east Asia and setting over eastern North America and South America.

Hourly motion shown right to left	The Moon's hourly motion across the Earth's shadow in the constellation of Virgo.
Visibility map

== Images ==
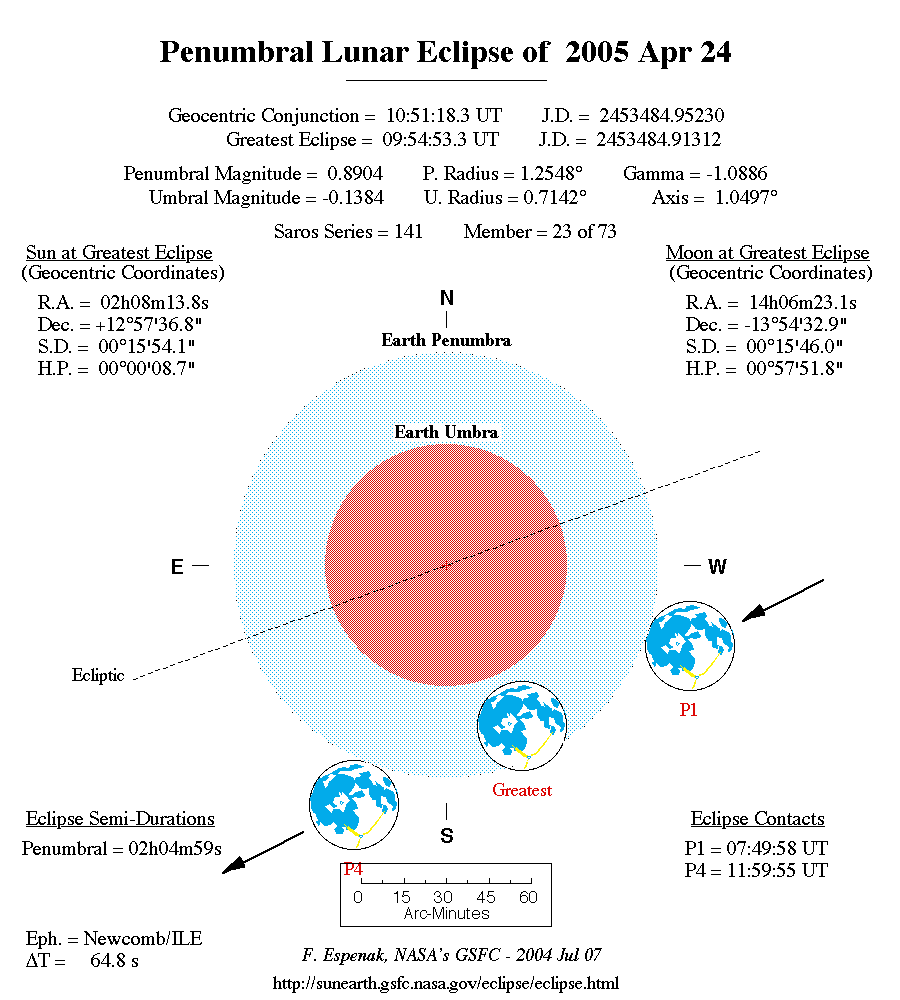
NASA chart of the eclipse

== Eclipse details ==
Shown below is a table displaying details about this particular solar eclipse. It describes various parameters pertaining to this eclipse.

April 24, 2005 Lunar Eclipse Parameters
Parameter	Value
Penumbral Magnitude	0.86693
Umbral Magnitude	−0.14165
Gamma	−1.08851
Sun Right Ascension	02h08m13.9s
Sun Declination	+12°57'36.8"
Sun Semi-Diameter	15'54.1"
Sun Equatorial Horizontal Parallax	08.7"
Moon Right Ascension	14h06m23.1s
Moon Declination	-13°54'32.8"
Moon Semi-Diameter	15'46.0"
Moon Equatorial Horizontal Parallax	0°57'51.7"
ΔT	64.7 s

== Eclipse season ==
This eclipse is part of an eclipse season, a period, roughly every six months, when eclipses occur. Only two (or occasionally three) eclipse seasons occur each year, and each season lasts about 35 days and repeats just short of six months (173 days) later; thus two full eclipse seasons always occur each year. Either two or three eclipses happen each eclipse season. In the sequence below, each eclipse is separated by a fortnight.

Eclipse season of April 2005
April 8 Ascending node (new moon)	April 24 Descending node (full moon)
Hybrid solar eclipse Solar Saros 129	Penumbral lunar eclipse Lunar Saros 141

== Related eclipses ==
=== Eclipses in 2005 ===
- A hybrid solar eclipse on April 8.
- A penumbral lunar eclipse on April 24.
- An annular solar eclipse on October 3.
- A partial lunar eclipse on October 17.

=== Metonic ===
- Preceded by: Lunar eclipse of July 5, 2001
- Followed by: Lunar eclipse of February 9, 2009

=== Tzolkinex ===
- Preceded by: Lunar eclipse of March 13, 1998
- Followed by: Lunar eclipse of June 4, 2012

=== Half-Saros ===
- Preceded by: Solar eclipse of April 17, 1996
- Followed by: Solar eclipse of April 29, 2014

=== Tritos ===
- Preceded by: Lunar eclipse of May 25, 1994
- Followed by: Lunar eclipse of March 23, 2016

=== Lunar Saros 141 ===
- Preceded by: Lunar eclipse of April 14, 1987
- Followed by: Lunar eclipse of May 5, 2023

=== Inex ===
- Preceded by: Lunar eclipse of May 13, 1976
- Followed by: Lunar eclipse of April 3, 2034

=== Triad ===
- Preceded by: Lunar eclipse of June 24, 1918
- Followed by: Lunar eclipse of February 23, 2092

=== Lunar eclipses of 2002–2005 ===
This eclipse is a member of a semester series. An eclipse in a semester series of lunar eclipses repeats approximately every 177 days and 4 hours (a semester) at alternating nodes of the Moon's orbit.

The penumbral lunar eclipse on June 24, 2002 occurs in the previous lunar year eclipse set.

Lunar eclipse series sets from 2002 to 2005
Descending node				Ascending node			
Saros	Date Viewing	Type Chart	Gamma	Saros	Date Viewing	Type Chart	Gamma
111	2002 May 26	Penumbral	1.1759	116	2002 Nov 20	Penumbral	−1.1127
121	2003 May 16	Total	0.4123	126	2003 Nov 09	Total	−0.4319
131	2004 May 04	Total	−0.3132	136	2004 Oct 28	Total	0.2846
141	2005 Apr 24	Penumbral	−1.0885	146	2005 Oct 17	Partial	0.9796

=== Metonic series ===
The Metonic cycle repeats nearly exactly every 19 years and represents a Saros cycle plus one lunar year. Because it occurs on the same calendar date, the Earth's shadow will in nearly the same location relative to the background stars.

Metonic lunar eclipse sets 1948–2005
Descending node			Ascending node		
Saros	Date	Type	Saros	Date	Type
111	1948 Apr 23	Partial	116	1948 Oct 18	Penumbral
121	1967 Apr 24	Total	126	1967 Oct 18	Total
131	1986 Apr 24	Total	136	1986 Oct 17	Total
141	2005 Apr 24	Penumbral	146	2005 Oct 17	Partial

=== Saros 141 ===
This eclipse is a part of Saros series 141, repeating every 18 years, 11 days, and containing 72 events. The series started with a penumbral lunar eclipse on August 25, 1608. It contains partial eclipses from May 16, 2041 through July 20, 2149; total eclipses from August 1, 2167 through May 1, 2618; and a second set of partial eclipses from May 12, 2636 through July 16, 2744. The series ends at member 72 as a penumbral eclipse on October 11, 2888.

The longest duration of totality will be produced by member 39 at 104 minutes, 36 seconds on October 16, 2293. All eclipses in this series occur at the Moon’s descending node of orbit.

Greatest	First			
The greatest eclipse of the series will occur on 2293 Oct 16, lasting 104 minutes, 36 seconds.	Penumbral	Partial	Total	Central
The greatest eclipse of the series will occur on 2293 Oct 16, lasting 104 minutes, 36 seconds.	1608 Aug 25	2041 May 16	2167 Aug 01	2221 Sep 02
The greatest eclipse of the series will occur on 2293 Oct 16, lasting 104 minutes, 36 seconds.	Last			
The greatest eclipse of the series will occur on 2293 Oct 16, lasting 104 minutes, 36 seconds.	Central	Total	Partial	Penumbral
The greatest eclipse of the series will occur on 2293 Oct 16, lasting 104 minutes, 36 seconds.	2546 Mar 18	2618 May 01	2744 Jul 16	2888 Oct 11

Eclipses are tabulated in three columns; every third eclipse in the same column is one exeligmos apart, so they all cast shadows over approximately the same parts of the Earth.

Series members 12–33 occur between 1801 and 2200:
12	13	14
1806 Dec 25	1825 Jan 04	1843 Jan 16
15	16	17
1861 Jan 26	1879 Feb 07	1897 Feb 17
18	19	20
1915 Mar 01	1933 Mar 12	1951 Mar 23
21	22	23
1969 Apr 02	1987 Apr 14	2005 Apr 24
24	25	26
2023 May 05	2041 May 16	2059 May 27
27	28	29
2077 Jun 06	2095 Jun 17	2113 Jun 29
30	31	32
2131 Jul 10	2149 Jul 20	2167 Aug 01
33
2185 Aug 11

=== Tritos series ===
This eclipse is a part of a tritos cycle, repeating at alternating nodes every 135 synodic months (≈ 3986.63 days, or 11 years minus 1 month). Their appearance and longitude are irregular due to a lack of synchronization with the anomalistic month (period of perigee), but groupings of 3 tritos cycles (≈ 33 years minus 3 months) come close (≈ 434.044 anomalistic months), so eclipses are similar in these groupings.

Series members between 1801 and 2200
1808 Nov 03 (Saros 123)	1819 Oct 03 (Saros 124)	1830 Sep 02 (Saros 125)	1841 Aug 02 (Saros 126)	1852 Jul 01 (Saros 127)
1863 Jun 01 (Saros 128)	1874 May 01 (Saros 129)	1885 Mar 30 (Saros 130)	1896 Feb 28 (Saros 131)	1907 Jan 29 (Saros 132)
1917 Dec 28 (Saros 133)	1928 Nov 27 (Saros 134)	1939 Oct 28 (Saros 135)	1950 Sep 26 (Saros 136)	1961 Aug 26 (Saros 137)
1972 Jul 26 (Saros 138)	1983 Jun 25 (Saros 139)	1994 May 25 (Saros 140)	2005 Apr 24 (Saros 141)	2016 Mar 23 (Saros 142)
2027 Feb 20 (Saros 143)	2038 Jan 21 (Saros 144)	2048 Dec 20 (Saros 145)	2059 Nov 19 (Saros 146)	2070 Oct 19 (Saros 147)
2081 Sep 18 (Saros 148)	2092 Aug 17 (Saros 149)	2103 Jul 19 (Saros 150)	2114 Jun 18 (Saros 151)	2125 May 17 (Saros 152)
2136 Apr 16 (Saros 153)			2169 Jan 13 (Saros 156)	
2190 Nov 12 (Saros 158)

=== Inex series ===
This eclipse is a part of the long period inex cycle, repeating at alternating nodes, every 358 synodic months (≈ 10,571.95 days, or 29 years minus 20 days). Their appearance and longitude are irregular due to a lack of synchronization with the anomalistic month (period of perigee). However, groupings of 3 inex cycles (≈ 87 years minus 2 months) comes close (≈ 1,151.02 anomalistic months), so eclipses are similar in these groupings.

Series members between 1801 and 2200
1802 Sep 11 (Saros 134)	1831 Aug 23 (Saros 135)	1860 Aug 01 (Saros 136)
1889 Jul 12 (Saros 137)	1918 Jun 24 (Saros 138)	1947 Jun 03 (Saros 139)
1976 May 13 (Saros 140)	2005 Apr 24 (Saros 141)	2034 Apr 03 (Saros 142)
2063 Mar 14 (Saros 143)	2092 Feb 23 (Saros 144)	2121 Feb 02 (Saros 145)
2150 Jan 13 (Saros 146)	2178 Dec 24 (Saros 147)	

=== Half-Saros cycle ===
A lunar eclipse will be preceded and followed by solar eclipses by 9 years and 5.5 days (a half saros). This lunar eclipse is related to two solar eclipses of Solar Saros 148.

April 17, 1996	April 29, 2014

== See also ==
- List of lunar eclipses and List of 21st-century lunar eclipses
- May 2003 lunar eclipse
- November 2003 lunar eclipse
- May 2004 lunar eclipse
- File:2005-04-24 Lunar Eclipse Sketch.gif Chart
