= March 1933 lunar eclipse =

Penumbral lunar eclipse March 12, 1933

- Penumbral eclipse
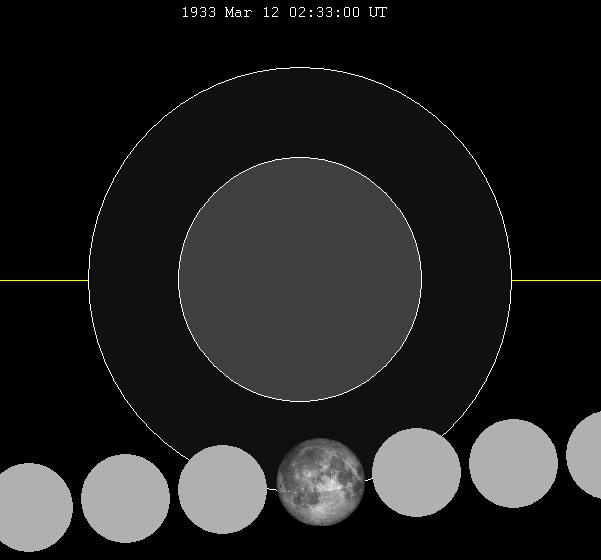
- The Moon's hourly motion shown right to left
- Date: March 12, 1933
- Gamma: −1.2369
- Magnitude: −0.4153
- Saros cycle: 141 (19 of 73)
- Penumbral: 206 minutes, 15 seconds
Contacts (UTC)
- P1: 0:49:38
- Greatest: 2:32:40
- P4: 4:15:53

A penumbral lunar eclipse occurred at the Moon’s descending node of orbit on Sunday, March 12, 1933, with an umbral magnitude of −0.4153. A lunar eclipse occurs when the Moon moves into the Earth's shadow, causing the Moon to be darkened. A penumbral lunar eclipse occurs when part or all of the Moon's near side passes into the Earth's penumbra. Unlike a solar eclipse, which can only be viewed from a relatively small area of the world, a lunar eclipse may be viewed from anywhere on the night side of Earth. Occurring about 3.5 days before perigee (on March 15, 1933, at 17:25 UTC), the Moon's apparent diameter was larger.

This eclipse was the second of four penumbral lunar eclipses in 1933, with the others occurring on February 10, August 5, and September 4.

== Visibility ==
The eclipse was completely visible over eastern North America, South America, and much of Africa and Europe, seen rising over western North America and the eastern Pacific Ocean and setting over east Africa and west, central, and south Asia.

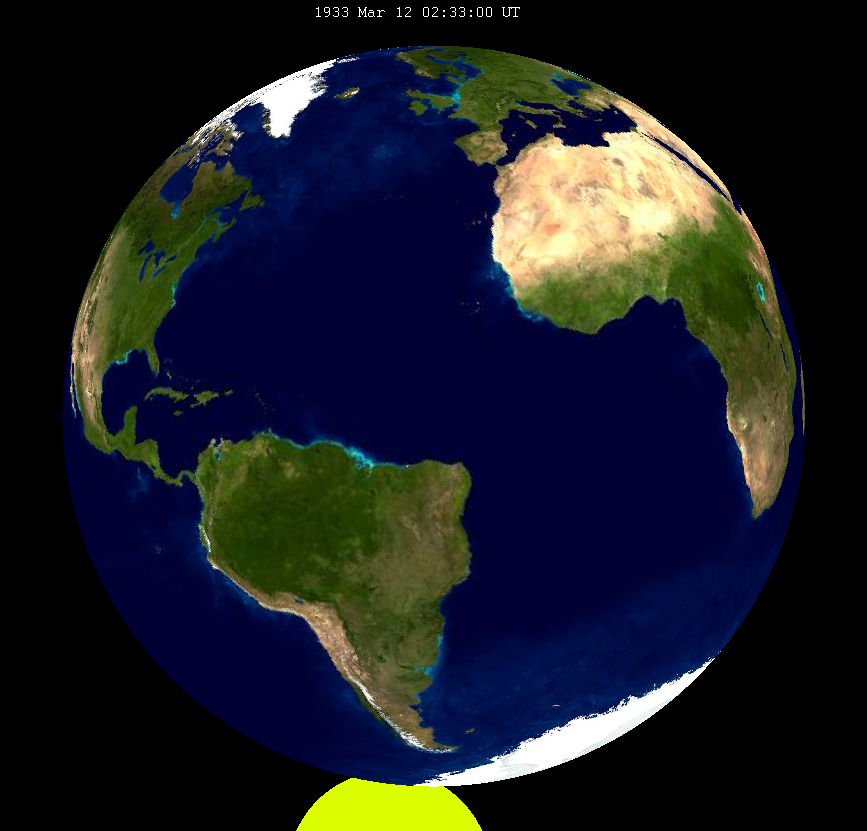
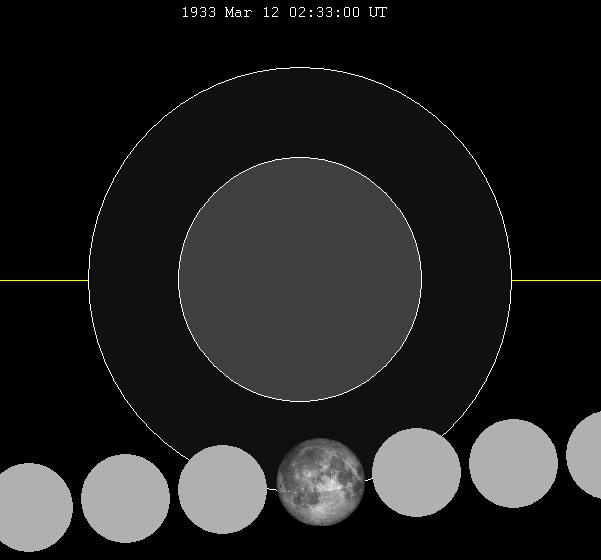

== Eclipse details ==
Shown below is a table displaying details about this particular lunar eclipse. It describes various parameters pertaining to this eclipse.

March 12, 1933 Lunar Eclipse Parameters
Parameter	Value
Penumbral Magnitude	0.59243
Umbral Magnitude	−0.41533
Gamma	−1.23688
Sun Right Ascension	23h27m13.2s
Sun Declination	-03°32'18.1"
Sun Semi-Diameter	16'05.6"
Sun Equatorial Horizontal Parallax	08.8"
Moon Right Ascension	11h24m53.7s
Moon Declination	+02°28'43.1"
Moon Semi-Diameter	15'58.2"
Moon Equatorial Horizontal Parallax	0°58'36.5"
ΔT	23.9 s

== Eclipse season ==
This eclipse is part of an eclipse season, a period, roughly every six months, when eclipses occur. Only two (or occasionally three) eclipse seasons occur each year, and each season lasts about 35 days and repeats just short of six months (173 days) later; thus, two full eclipse seasons always occur each year. Either two or three eclipses happen each eclipse season. In the sequence below, each eclipse is separated by a fortnight. The first and last eclipse in this sequence is separated by one synodic month.

Eclipse season of February–March 1933
February 10 Descending node (full moon)	February 24 Ascending node (new moon)	March 12 Descending node (full moon)
Penumbral lunar eclipse Lunar Saros 103	Annular solar eclipse Solar Saros 129	Penumbral lunar eclipse Lunar Saros 141

== Related eclipses ==
=== Eclipses in 1933 ===
- A penumbral lunar eclipse on February 10.
- An annular solar eclipse on February 24.
- A penumbral lunar eclipse on March 12.
- A penumbral lunar eclipse on August 5.
- An annular solar eclipse on August 21.
- A penumbral lunar eclipse on September 4.

=== Metonic ===
- Preceded by: Lunar eclipse of May 23, 1929
- Followed by: Lunar eclipse of December 28, 1936

=== Tzolkinex ===
- Preceded by: Lunar eclipse of January 28, 1926
- Followed by: Lunar eclipse of April 22, 1940

=== Half-Saros ===
- Preceded by: Solar eclipse of March 5, 1924
- Followed by: Solar eclipse of March 16, 1942

=== Tritos ===
- Preceded by: Lunar eclipse of April 11, 1922
- Followed by: Lunar eclipse of February 9, 1944

=== Lunar Saros 141 ===
- Preceded by: Lunar eclipse of March 1, 1915
- Followed by: Lunar eclipse of March 23, 1951

=== Inex ===
- Preceded by: Lunar eclipse of March 31, 1904
- Followed by: Lunar eclipse of February 19, 1962

=== Triad ===
- Preceded by: Lunar eclipse of May 11, 1846
- Followed by: Lunar eclipse of January 10, 2020

=== Lunar eclipses of 1930–1933 ===
This eclipse is a member of a semester series. An eclipse in a semester series of lunar eclipses repeats approximately every 177 days and 4 hours (a semester) at alternating nodes of the Moon's orbit.

The penumbral lunar eclipses on February 10, 1933 and August 5, 1933 occur in the next lunar year eclipse set.

Lunar eclipse series sets from 1930 to 1933
Descending node				Ascending node			
Saros	Date Viewing	Type Chart	Gamma	Saros	Date Viewing	Type Chart	Gamma
111	1930 Apr 13	Partial	0.9545	116	1930 Oct 07	Partial	−0.9812
121	1931 Apr 02	Total	0.2043	126	1931 Sep 26	Total	−0.2698
131	1932 Mar 22	Partial	−0.4956	136	1932 Sep 14	Partial	0.4664
141	1933 Mar 12	Penumbral	−1.2369	146	1933 Sep 04	Penumbral	1.1776

=== Saros 141 ===
This eclipse is a part of Saros series 141, repeating every 18 years, 11 days, and containing 72 events. The series started with a penumbral lunar eclipse on August 25, 1608. It contains partial eclipses from May 16, 2041 through July 20, 2149; total eclipses from August 1, 2167 through May 1, 2618; and a second set of partial eclipses from May 12, 2636 through July 16, 2744. The series ends at member 72 as a penumbral eclipse on October 11, 2888.

The longest duration of totality will be produced by member 39 at 104 minutes, 36 seconds on October 16, 2293. All eclipses in this series occur at the Moon’s descending node of orbit.

Greatest	First			
The greatest eclipse of the series will occur on 2293 Oct 16, lasting 104 minutes, 36 seconds.	Penumbral	Partial	Total	Central
The greatest eclipse of the series will occur on 2293 Oct 16, lasting 104 minutes, 36 seconds.	1608 Aug 25	2041 May 16	2167 Aug 01	2221 Sep 02
The greatest eclipse of the series will occur on 2293 Oct 16, lasting 104 minutes, 36 seconds.	Last			
The greatest eclipse of the series will occur on 2293 Oct 16, lasting 104 minutes, 36 seconds.	Central	Total	Partial	Penumbral
The greatest eclipse of the series will occur on 2293 Oct 16, lasting 104 minutes, 36 seconds.	2546 Mar 18	2618 May 01	2744 Jul 16	2888 Oct 11

Eclipses are tabulated in three columns; every third eclipse in the same column is one exeligmos apart, so they all cast shadows over approximately the same parts of the Earth.

Series members 12–33 occur between 1801 and 2200:
12	13	14
1806 Dec 25	1825 Jan 04	1843 Jan 16
15	16	17
1861 Jan 26	1879 Feb 07	1897 Feb 17
18	19	20
1915 Mar 01	1933 Mar 12	1951 Mar 23
21	22	23
1969 Apr 02	1987 Apr 14	2005 Apr 24
24	25	26
2023 May 05	2041 May 16	2059 May 27
27	28	29
2077 Jun 06	2095 Jun 17	2113 Jun 29
30	31	32
2131 Jul 10	2149 Jul 20	2167 Aug 01
33
2185 Aug 11

=== Tritos series ===
This eclipse is a part of a tritos cycle, repeating at alternating nodes every 135 synodic months (≈ 3986.63 days, or 11 years minus 1 month). Their appearance and longitude are irregular due to a lack of synchronization with the anomalistic month (period of perigee), but groupings of 3 tritos cycles (≈ 33 years minus 3 months) come close (≈ 434.044 anomalistic months), so eclipses are similar in these groupings.

Series members between 1801 and 2096
1802 Mar 19 (Saros 129)	1813 Feb 15 (Saros 130)	1824 Jan 16 (Saros 131)	1834 Dec 16 (Saros 132)	1845 Nov 14 (Saros 133)
1856 Oct 13 (Saros 134)	1867 Sep 14 (Saros 135)	1878 Aug 13 (Saros 136)	1889 Jul 12 (Saros 137)	1900 Jun 13 (Saros 138)
1911 May 13 (Saros 139)	1922 Apr 11 (Saros 140)	1933 Mar 12 (Saros 141)	1944 Feb 09 (Saros 142)	1955 Jan 08 (Saros 143)
1965 Dec 08 (Saros 144)	1976 Nov 06 (Saros 145)	1987 Oct 07 (Saros 146)	1998 Sep 06 (Saros 147)	2009 Aug 06 (Saros 148)
2020 Jul 05 (Saros 149)	2031 Jun 05 (Saros 150)			
		2096 Nov 29 (Saros 156)		

=== Inex series ===
This eclipse is a part of the long period inex cycle, repeating at alternating nodes, every 358 synodic months (≈ 10,571.95 days, or 29 years minus 20 days). Their appearance and longitude are irregular due to a lack of synchronization with the anomalistic month (period of perigee). However, groupings of 3 inex cycles (≈ 87 years minus 2 months) comes close (≈ 1,151.02 anomalistic months), so eclipses are similar in these groupings.

Series members between 1801 and 2200
1817 May 30 (Saros 137)	1846 May 11 (Saros 138)	1875 Apr 20 (Saros 139)
1904 Mar 31 (Saros 140)	1933 Mar 12 (Saros 141)	1962 Feb 19 (Saros 142)
1991 Jan 30 (Saros 143)	2020 Jan 10 (Saros 144)	2048 Dec 20 (Saros 145)
2077 Nov 29 (Saros 146)	2106 Nov 11 (Saros 147)	2135 Oct 22 (Saros 148)
2164 Sep 30 (Saros 149)	2193 Sep 11 (Saros 150)	

=== Half-Saros cycle ===
A lunar eclipse will be preceded and followed by solar eclipses by 9 years and 5.5 days (a half saros). This lunar eclipse is related to two total solar eclipses of Solar Saros 148.

March 5, 1924	March 16, 1942

== See also ==
- List of lunar eclipses
- List of 20th-century lunar eclipses
