= Solar eclipse of March 27, 1960 =

20th-century partial solar eclipse

- Partial eclipse
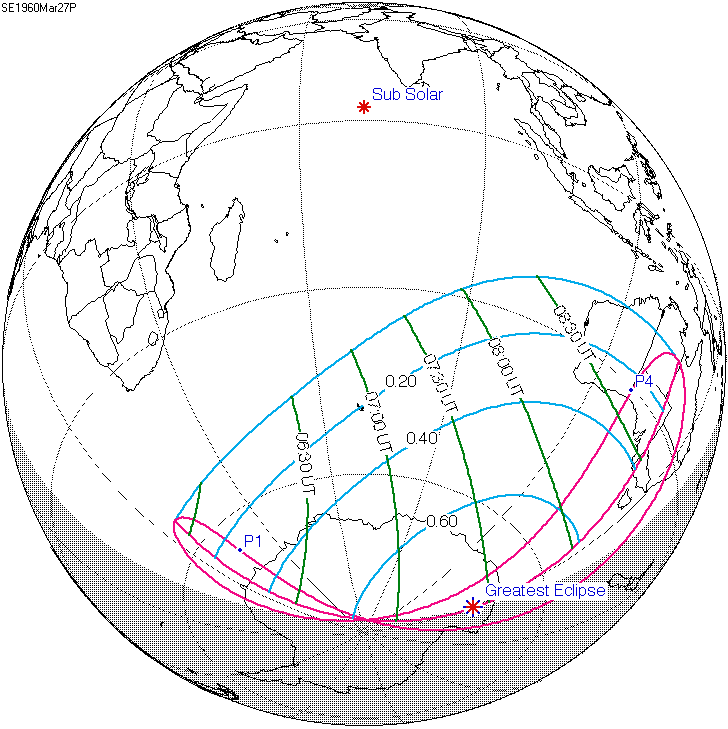
- Map
- Gamma: −1.1537
- Magnitude: 0.7058

Maximum eclipse
- Coordinates: 72.1°S 151.9°E

Times (UTC)
- Greatest eclipse: 7:25:07

References
- Saros: 148 (18 of 75)
- Catalog # (SE5000): 9420

A partial solar eclipse occurred at the Moon's descending node of orbit on Sunday, March 27, 1960, with a magnitude of 0.7058. A solar eclipse occurs when the Moon passes between Earth and the Sun, thereby totally or partly obscuring the image of the Sun for a viewer on Earth. A partial solar eclipse occurs in the polar regions of the Earth when the center of the Moon's shadow misses the Earth.

A partial eclipse was visible for parts of Antarctica and Australia.

== Eclipse details ==
Shown below are two tables displaying details about this particular solar eclipse. The first table outlines times at which the Moon's penumbra or umbra attains the specific parameter, and the second table describes various other parameters pertaining to this eclipse.

March 27, 1960 Solar Eclipse Times
Event	Time (UTC)
First Penumbral External Contact	1960 March 27 at 05:28:45.5 UTC
Equatorial Conjunction	1960 March 27 at 06:43:57.7 UTC
Greatest Eclipse	1960 March 27 at 07:25:07.4 UTC
Ecliptic Conjunction	1960 March 27 at 07:37:51.6 UTC
Last Penumbral External Contact	1960 March 27 at 09:21:54.0 UTC

March 27, 1960 Solar Eclipse Parameters
Parameter	Value
Eclipse Magnitude	0.70578
Eclipse Obscuration	0.62365
Gamma	−1.15375
Sun Right Ascension	00h24m22.7s
Sun Declination	+02°38'08.8"
Sun Semi-Diameter	16'01.4"
Sun Equatorial Horizontal Parallax	08.8"
Moon Right Ascension	00h25m42.2s
Moon Declination	+01°35'48.1"
Moon Semi-Diameter	15'29.5"
Moon Equatorial Horizontal Parallax	0°56'51.5"
ΔT	33.3 s

== Eclipse season ==
This eclipse is part of an eclipse season, a period, roughly every six months, when eclipses occur. Only two (or occasionally three) eclipse seasons occur each year, and each season lasts about 35 days and repeats just short of six months (173 days) later; thus two full eclipse seasons always occur each year. Either two or three eclipses happen each eclipse season. In the sequence below, each eclipse is separated by a fortnight.

Eclipse season of March 1960
March 13 Ascending node (full moon)	March 27 Descending node (new moon)
Total lunar eclipse Lunar Saros 122	Partial solar eclipse Solar Saros 148

== Related eclipses ==
=== Eclipses in 1960 ===
- A total lunar eclipse on March 13.
- A partial solar eclipse on March 27.
- A total lunar eclipse on September 5.
- A partial solar eclipse on September 20.

=== Metonic ===
- Preceded by: Solar eclipse of June 8, 1956
- Followed by: Solar eclipse of January 14, 1964

=== Tzolkinex ===
- Preceded by: Solar eclipse of February 14, 1953
- Followed by: Solar eclipse of May 9, 1967

=== Half-Saros ===
- Preceded by: Lunar eclipse of March 23, 1951
- Followed by: Lunar eclipse of April 2, 1969

=== Tritos ===
- Preceded by: Solar eclipse of April 28, 1949
- Followed by: Solar eclipse of February 25, 1971

=== Solar Saros 148 ===
- Preceded by: Solar eclipse of March 16, 1942
- Followed by: Solar eclipse of April 7, 1978

=== Inex ===
- Preceded by: Solar eclipse of April 18, 1931
- Followed by: Solar eclipse of March 7, 1989

=== Triad ===
- Preceded by: Solar eclipse of May 26, 1873
- Followed by: Solar eclipse of January 26, 2047

=== Solar eclipses of 1957–1960 ===
This eclipse is a member of a semester series. An eclipse in a semester series of solar eclipses repeats approximately every 177 days and 4 hours (a semester) at alternating nodes of the Moon's orbit.

Solar eclipse series sets from 1957 to 1960
Descending node			Ascending node		
Saros	Map	Gamma	Saros	Map	Gamma
118	April 30, 1957 Annular (non-central)	0.9992	123	October 23, 1957 Total (non-central)	1.0022
128	April 19, 1958 Annular	0.275	133	October 12, 1958 Total	−0.2951
138	April 8, 1959 Annular	−0.4546	143	October 2, 1959 Total	0.4207
148	March 27, 1960 Partial	−1.1537	153	September 20, 1960 Partial	1.2057

=== Saros 148 ===
This eclipse is a part of Saros series 148, repeating every 18 years, 11 days, and containing 75 events. The series started with a partial solar eclipse on September 21, 1653. It contains annular eclipses on April 29, 2014 and May 9, 2032; a hybrid eclipse on May 20, 2050; and total eclipses from May 31, 2068 through August 3, 2771. The series ends at member 75 as a partial eclipse on December 12, 2987. Its eclipses are tabulated in three columns; every third eclipse in the same column is one exeligmos apart, so they all cast shadows over approximately the same parts of the Earth.

The longest duration of annularity will be produced by member 22 at 22 seconds (by default) on May 9, 2032, and the longest duration of totality will be produced by member 54 at 5 minutes, 23 seconds on April 26, 2609. All eclipses in this series occur at the Moon’s descending node of orbit.

Series members 10–31 occur between 1801 and 2200:
10	11	12
December 30, 1815	January 9, 1834	January 21, 1852
13	14	15
January 31, 1870	February 11, 1888	February 23, 1906
16	17	18
March 5, 1924	March 16, 1942	March 27, 1960
19	20	21
April 7, 1978	April 17, 1996	April 29, 2014
22	23	24
May 9, 2032	May 20, 2050	May 31, 2068
25	26	27
June 11, 2086	June 22, 2104	July 4, 2122
28	29	30
July 14, 2140	July 25, 2158	August 4, 2176
31
August 16, 2194

=== Metonic series ===
The metonic series repeats eclipses every 19 years (6939.69 days), lasting about 5 cycles. Eclipses occur in nearly the same calendar date. In addition, the octon subseries repeats 1/5 of that or every 3.8 years (1387.94 days). All eclipses in this table occur at the Moon's descending node.

22 eclipse events between March 27, 1884 and August 20, 1971
March 27–29	January 14	November 1–2	August 20–21	June 8
108	110	112	114	116
March 27, 1884			August 20, 1895	June 8, 1899
118	120	122	124	126
March 29, 1903	January 14, 1907	November 2, 1910	August 21, 1914	June 8, 1918
128	130	132	134	136
March 28, 1922	January 14, 1926	November 1, 1929	August 21, 1933	June 8, 1937
138	140	142	144	146
March 27, 1941	January 14, 1945	November 1, 1948	August 20, 1952	June 8, 1956
148	150	152	154	
March 27, 1960	January 14, 1964	November 2, 1967	August 20, 1971	

=== Tritos series ===
This eclipse is a part of a tritos cycle, repeating at alternating nodes every 135 synodic months (≈ 3986.63 days, or 11 years minus 1 month). Their appearance and longitude are irregular due to a lack of synchronization with the anomalistic month (period of perigee), but groupings of 3 tritos cycles (≈ 33 years minus 3 months) come close (≈ 434.044 anomalistic months), so eclipses are similar in these groupings.

The partial solar eclipses on November 16, 2134 (part of Saros 164) and October 16, 2145 (part of Saros 165) are also a part of this series but are not included in the table below.

Series members between 1801 and 2069
June 6, 1807 (Saros 134)	May 5, 1818 (Saros 135)	April 3, 1829 (Saros 136)	March 4, 1840 (Saros 137)	February 1, 1851 (Saros 138)
December 31, 1861 (Saros 139)	November 30, 1872 (Saros 140)	October 30, 1883 (Saros 141)	September 29, 1894 (Saros 142)	August 30, 1905 (Saros 143)
July 30, 1916 (Saros 144)	June 29, 1927 (Saros 145)	May 29, 1938 (Saros 146)	April 28, 1949 (Saros 147)	March 27, 1960 (Saros 148)
February 25, 1971 (Saros 149)	January 25, 1982 (Saros 150)	December 24, 1992 (Saros 151)	November 23, 2003 (Saros 152)	October 23, 2014 (Saros 153)
September 21, 2025 (Saros 154)	August 21, 2036 (Saros 155)	July 22, 2047 (Saros 156)	June 21, 2058 (Saros 157)	May 20, 2069 (Saros 158)

=== Inex series ===
This eclipse is a part of the long period inex cycle, repeating at alternating nodes, every 358 synodic months (≈ 10,571.95 days, or 29 years minus 20 days). Their appearance and longitude are irregular due to a lack of synchronization with the anomalistic month (period of perigee). However, groupings of 3 inex cycles (≈ 87 years minus 2 months) comes close (≈ 1,151.02 anomalistic months), so eclipses are similar in these groupings.

Series members between 1801 and 2200
July 6, 1815 (Saros 143)	June 16, 1844 (Saros 144)	May 26, 1873 (Saros 145)
May 7, 1902 (Saros 146)	April 18, 1931 (Saros 147)	March 27, 1960 (Saros 148)
March 7, 1989 (Saros 149)	February 15, 2018 (Saros 150)	January 26, 2047 (Saros 151)
January 6, 2076 (Saros 152)	December 17, 2104 (Saros 153)	November 26, 2133 (Saros 154)
November 7, 2162 (Saros 155)	October 18, 2191 (Saros 156)	
