= May 2004 lunar eclipse =

Total lunar eclipse 4 May 2004

- Total eclipse
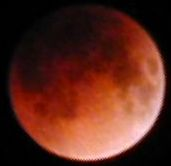
- Totality as viewed from Haifa, Israel, 20:46 UTC
- Date: May 4, 2004
- Gamma: −0.3132
- Magnitude: 1.3035
- Saros cycle: 131 (33 of 72)
- Totality: 75 minutes, 28 seconds
- Partiality: 203 minutes, 12 seconds
- Penumbral: 315 minutes, 43 seconds
Contacts (UTC)
- P1: 17:52:54
- U1: 18:48:38
- U2: 19:52:29
- Greatest: 20:30:13
- U3: 21:07:57
- U4: 22:11:50
- P4: 23:08:03

A total lunar eclipse occurred at the Moon’s descending node of orbit on Tuesday, May 4, 2004, with an umbral magnitude of 1.3035. A lunar eclipse occurs when the Moon moves into the Earth's shadow, causing the Moon to be darkened. A total lunar eclipse occurs when the Moon's near side entirely passes into the Earth's umbral shadow. Unlike a solar eclipse, which can only be viewed from a relatively small area of the world, a lunar eclipse may be viewed from anywhere on the night side of Earth. A total lunar eclipse can last up to nearly two hours, while a total solar eclipse lasts only a few minutes at any given place, because the Moon's shadow is smaller. Occurring about 1.2 days before perigee (on May 6, 2004, at 0:30 UTC), the Moon's apparent diameter was larger.

This lunar eclipse is the third of a tetrad, with four total lunar eclipses in series, the others being on May 16, 2003; November 9, 2003; and October 28, 2004.

== Visibility ==
The eclipse was completely visible over much of Africa, eastern Europe, Antarctica, and Asia, central, and south Asia, seen rising over South America, western Europe, and west Africa and setting over east Asia and Australia.

Hourly motion shown right to left
The moon's hourly motion across the Earth's shadow in the constellation of Libra.

== Eclipse details ==
Shown below is a table displaying details about this particular lunar eclipse. It describes various parameters pertaining to this eclipse.

May 4, 2004 Lunar Eclipse Parameters
Parameter	Value
Penumbral Magnitude	2.26449
Umbral Magnitude	1.30536
Gamma	−0.31320
Sun Right Ascension	02h48m55.8s
Sun Declination	+16°14'51.5"
Sun Semi-Diameter	15'51.5"
Sun Equatorial Horizontal Parallax	08.7"
Moon Right Ascension	14h48m25.1s
Moon Declination	-16°32'22.6"
Moon Semi-Diameter	16'32.0"
Moon Equatorial Horizontal Parallax	1°00'40.8"
ΔT	64.5 s

== Eclipse season ==
This eclipse is part of an eclipse season, a period, roughly every six months, when eclipses occur. Only two (or occasionally three) eclipse seasons occur each year, and each season lasts about 35 days and repeats just short of six months (173 days) later; thus two full eclipse seasons always occur each year. Either two or three eclipses happen each eclipse season. In the sequence below, each eclipse is separated by a fortnight.

Eclipse season of April–May 2004
April 19 Ascending node (new moon)	May 4 Descending node (full moon)
Partial solar eclipse Solar Saros 119	Total lunar eclipse Lunar Saros 131

== Related lunar eclipses ==
=== Eclipses in 2004 ===
- A partial solar eclipse on April 19.
- A total lunar eclipse on May 4.
- A partial solar eclipse on October 14.
- A total lunar eclipse on October 28.

=== Metonic ===
- Preceded by: Lunar eclipse of July 16, 2000
- Followed by: Lunar eclipse of February 21, 2008

=== Tzolkinex ===
- Preceded by: Lunar eclipse of March 24, 1997
- Followed by: Lunar eclipse of June 15, 2011

=== Half-Saros ===
- Preceded by: Solar eclipse of April 29, 1995
- Followed by: Solar eclipse of May 10, 2013

=== Tritos ===
- Preceded by: Lunar eclipse of June 4, 1993
- Followed by: Lunar eclipse of April 4, 2015

=== Lunar Saros 131 ===
- Preceded by: Lunar eclipse of April 24, 1986
- Followed by: Lunar eclipse of May 16, 2022

=== Inex ===
- Preceded by: Lunar eclipse of May 25, 1975
- Followed by: Lunar eclipse of April 14, 2033

=== Triad ===
- Preceded by: Lunar eclipse of July 4, 1917
- Followed by: Lunar eclipse of March 5, 2091

=== Lunar eclipses of 2002–2005 ===
This eclipse is a member of a semester series. An eclipse in a semester series of lunar eclipses repeats approximately every 177 days and 4 hours (a semester) at alternating nodes of the Moon's orbit.

The penumbral lunar eclipse on June 24, 2002 occurs in the previous lunar year eclipse set.

Lunar eclipse series sets from 2002 to 2005
Descending node				Ascending node			
Saros	Date Viewing	Type Chart	Gamma	Saros	Date Viewing	Type Chart	Gamma
111	2002 May 26	Penumbral	1.1759	116	2002 Nov 20	Penumbral	−1.1127
121	2003 May 16	Total	0.4123	126	2003 Nov 09	Total	−0.4319
131	2004 May 04	Total	−0.3132	136	2004 Oct 28	Total	0.2846
141	2005 Apr 24	Penumbral	−1.0885	146	2005 Oct 17	Partial	0.9796

=== Saros 131 ===
This eclipse is a part of Saros series 131, repeating every 18 years, 11 days, and containing 72 events. The series started with a penumbral lunar eclipse on May 10, 1427. It contains partial eclipses from July 25, 1553 through March 22, 1932; total eclipses from April 2, 1950 through September 3, 2202; and a second set of partial eclipses from September 13, 2220 through April 9, 2563. The series ends at member 72 as a penumbral eclipse on July 7, 2707.

The longest duration of totality will be produced by member 38 at 100 minutes, 36 seconds on June 28, 2094. All eclipses in this series occur at the Moon’s descending node of orbit.

Greatest	First			
The greatest eclipse of the series will occur on 2094 Jun 28, lasting 100 minutes, 36 seconds.	Penumbral	Partial	Total	Central
The greatest eclipse of the series will occur on 2094 Jun 28, lasting 100 minutes, 36 seconds.	1427 May 10	1553 Jul 25	1950 Apr 02	2022 May 16
The greatest eclipse of the series will occur on 2094 Jun 28, lasting 100 minutes, 36 seconds.	Last			
The greatest eclipse of the series will occur on 2094 Jun 28, lasting 100 minutes, 36 seconds.	Central	Total	Partial	Penumbral
The greatest eclipse of the series will occur on 2094 Jun 28, lasting 100 minutes, 36 seconds.	2148 Jul 31	2202 Sep 03	2563 Apr 09	2707 Jul 07

Eclipses are tabulated in three columns; every third eclipse in the same column is one exeligmos apart, so they all cast shadows over approximately the same parts of the Earth.

Series members 22–43 occur between 1801 and 2200:
22	23	24
1806 Jan 05	1824 Jan 16	1842 Jan 26
25	26	27
1860 Feb 07	1878 Feb 17	1896 Feb 28
28	29	30
1914 Mar 12	1932 Mar 22	1950 Apr 02
31	32	33
1968 Apr 13	1986 Apr 24	2004 May 04
34	35	36
2022 May 16	2040 May 26	2058 Jun 06
37	38	39
2076 Jun 17	2094 Jun 28	2112 Jul 09
40	41	42
2130 Jul 21	2148 Jul 31	2166 Aug 11
43
2184 Aug 21

=== Metonic series ===
The metonic cycle repeats nearly exactly every 19 years and represents a Saros cycle plus one lunar year. Because it occurs on the same calendar date, the Earth's shadow will in nearly the same location relative to the background stars.

Metonic events: May 4 and October 28
Descending node	Ascending node
1. 1966 May 4 - Penumbral (111); 2. 1985 May 4 - Total (121); 3. 2004 May 4 - Total (131); 4. 2023 May 5 - Penumbral (141)	1. 1966 Oct 29 - Penumbral (116); 2. 1985 Oct 28 - Total (126); 3. 2004 Oct 28 - Total (136); 4. 2023 Oct 28 - Partial (146); 5. 2042 Oct 28 - Penumbral (156)

=== Tritos series ===
This eclipse is a part of a tritos cycle, repeating at alternating nodes every 135 synodic months (≈ 3986.63 days, or 11 years minus 1 month). Their appearance and longitude are irregular due to a lack of synchronization with the anomalistic month (period of perigee), but groupings of 3 tritos cycles (≈ 33 years minus 3 months) come close (≈ 434.044 anomalistic months), so eclipses are similar in these groupings.

Series members between 1801 and 2200
1807 Nov 15 (Saros 113)	1818 Oct 14 (Saros 114)	1829 Sep 13 (Saros 115)	1840 Aug 13 (Saros 116)	1851 Jul 13 (Saros 117)
1862 Jun 12 (Saros 118)	1873 May 12 (Saros 119)	1884 Apr 10 (Saros 120)	1895 Mar 11 (Saros 121)	1906 Feb 09 (Saros 122)
1917 Jan 08 (Saros 123)	1927 Dec 08 (Saros 124)	1938 Nov 07 (Saros 125)	1949 Oct 07 (Saros 126)	1960 Sep 05 (Saros 127)
1971 Aug 06 (Saros 128)	1982 Jul 06 (Saros 129)	1993 Jun 04 (Saros 130)	2004 May 04 (Saros 131)	2015 Apr 04 (Saros 132)
2026 Mar 03 (Saros 133)	2037 Jan 31 (Saros 134)	2048 Jan 01 (Saros 135)	2058 Nov 30 (Saros 136)	2069 Oct 30 (Saros 137)
2080 Sep 29 (Saros 138)	2091 Aug 29 (Saros 139)	2102 Jul 30 (Saros 140)	2113 Jun 29 (Saros 141)	2124 May 28 (Saros 142)
2135 Apr 28 (Saros 143)	2146 Mar 28 (Saros 144)	2157 Feb 24 (Saros 145)	2168 Jan 24 (Saros 146)	2178 Dec 24 (Saros 147)
2189 Nov 22 (Saros 148)	2200 Oct 23 (Saros 149)			

=== Inex series ===
This eclipse is a part of the long period inex cycle, repeating at alternating nodes, every 358 synodic months (≈ 10,571.95 days, or 29 years minus 20 days). Their appearance and longitude are irregular due to a lack of synchronization with the anomalistic month (period of perigee). However, groupings of 3 inex cycles (≈ 87 years minus 2 months) comes close (≈ 1,151.02 anomalistic months), so eclipses are similar in these groupings.

Series members between 1801 and 2200
1801 Sep 22 (Saros 124)	1830 Sep 02 (Saros 125)	1859 Aug 13 (Saros 126)
1888 Jul 23 (Saros 127)	1917 Jul 04 (Saros 128)	1946 Jun 14 (Saros 129)
1975 May 25 (Saros 130)	2004 May 04 (Saros 131)	2033 Apr 14 (Saros 132)
2062 Mar 25 (Saros 133)	2091 Mar 05 (Saros 134)	2120 Feb 14 (Saros 135)
2149 Jan 23 (Saros 136)	2178 Jan 04 (Saros 137)	

=== Half-Saros cycle ===
A lunar eclipse will be preceded and followed by solar eclipses by 9 years and 5.5 days (a half saros). This lunar eclipse is related to two annular solar eclipses of Solar Saros 138.

April 29, 1995	May 10, 2013

== See also ==
- List of lunar eclipses and List of 21st-century lunar eclipses
- May 2003 lunar eclipse
- November 2003 lunar eclipse
- October 2004 lunar eclipse
