= Lunar Saros 141 =

Eclipse cycle of the moon

Member 23	Member 24
2005 Apr 24	2023 May 05

Saros cycle series 141 for lunar eclipses occurs at the moon's descending node, repeats every 18 years 11 and 1/3 days. It contains 72 events.

This lunar saros is linked to Solar Saros 148.

== List ==
Cat.	Saros	Mem	Date	Time UT (hr:mn)	Type	Gamma	Magnitude	Duration (min)			Contacts UT (hr:mn)						Chart
Cat.	Saros	Mem	Date	Greatest	Type	Gamma	Magnitude	Pen.	Par.	Tot.	P1	P4	U1	U2	U3	U4	Chart
08686	141	1	1608 Aug 25	19:20:07	Penumbral	-1.5413	-0.9471	21.1			19:09:34	19:30:40					
08731	141	2	1626 Sep 06	3:05:57	Penumbral	-1.4897	-0.8544	85.7			2:23:06	3:48:48					
08775	141	3	1644 Sep 16	10:59:45	Penumbral	-1.4448	-0.7742	115.0			10:02:15	11:57:15					
08820	141	4	1662 Sep 27	18:59:20	Penumbral	-1.4052	-0.7037	135.6			17:51:32	20:07:08					
08866	141	5	1680 Oct 08	3:06:25	Penumbral	-1.3719	-0.6450	150.6			1:51:07	4:21:43					
08912	141	6	1698 Oct 19	11:20:30	Penumbral	-1.3447	-0.5973	161.9			9:59:33	12:41:27					
08958	141	7	1716 Oct 30	19:42:19	Penumbral	-1.3238	-0.5613	170.2			18:17:13	21:07:25					
09005	141	8	1734 Nov 11	4:10:31	Penumbral	-1.3088	-0.5360	176.2			2:42:25	5:38:37					
09052	141	9	1752 Nov 21	12:43:58	Penumbral	-1.2983	-0.5189	180.5			11:13:43	14:14:13					
09098	141	10	1770 Dec 02	21:22:32	Penumbral	-1.2926	-0.5104	183.2			19:50:56	22:54:08					
09143	141	11	1788 Dec 13	6:04:27	Penumbral	-1.2898	-0.5069	185.0			4:31:57	7:36:57					
09188	141	12	1806 Dec 25	14:48:04	Penumbral	-1.2891	-0.5071	186.0			13:15:04	16:21:04					
09233	141	13	1825 Jan 04	23:31:53	Penumbral	-1.2890	-0.5081	186.8			21:58:29	1:05:17					
09279	141	14	1843 Jan 16	8:14:24	Penumbral	-1.2885	-0.5083	187.7			6:40:33	9:48:15					
09324	141	15	1861 Jan 26	16:54:03	Penumbral	-1.2864	-0.5052	189.0			15:19:33	18:28:33					
09368	141	16	1879 Feb 07	1:28:35	Penumbral	-1.2809	-0.4956	191.4			23:52:53	3:04:17					
09412	141	17	1897 Feb 17	9:57:44	Penumbral	-1.2717	-0.4790	194.8			8:20:20	11:35:08					
09454	141	18	1915 Mar 01	18:19:32	Penumbral	-1.2573	-0.4528	199.8			16:39:38	19:59:26					
09496	141	19	1933 Mar 12	2:33:03	Penumbral	-1.2369	-0.4154	206.3			0:49:54	4:16:12					
09537	141	20	1951 Mar 23	10:37:33	Penumbral	-1.2099	-0.3661	214.3			8:50:24	12:24:42					
09578	141	21	1969 Apr 02	18:33:06	Penumbral	-1.1764	-0.3047	223.7			16:41:15	20:24:57					
09620	141	22	1987 Apr 14	2:19:50	Penumbral	-1.1364	-0.2313	234.1			0:22:47	4:16:53					
09661	141	23	2005 Apr 24	9:55:55	Penumbral	-1.0885	-0.1436	245.6			7:53:07	11:58:43					
09702	141	24	2023 May 05	17:24:05	Penumbral	-1.0349	-0.0457	257.5			15:15:20	19:32:50					
09743	141	25	2041 May 16	0:43:03	Partial	-0.9746	0.0645	269.7	58.5		22:28:12	2:57:54	0:13:48			1:12:18	
09783	141	26	2059 May 27	7:55:35	Partial	-0.9097	0.1829	281.7	97.2		5:34:44	10:16:26	7:06:59			8:44:11	
09824	141	27	2077 Jun 06	14:59:52	Partial	-0.8387	0.3123	293.6	125.0		12:33:04	17:26:40	13:57:22			16:02:22	
09865	141	28	2095 Jun 17	22:00:11	Partial	-0.7653	0.4459	304.7	146.9		19:27:50	0:32:32	20:46:44			23:13:38	
09907	141	29	2113 Jun 29	4:55:26	Partial	-0.6887	0.5849	315.1	165.2		2:17:53	7:32:59	3:32:50			6:18:02	
09949	141	30	2131 Jul 10	11:47:56	Partial	-0.6107	0.7265	324.5	180.4		9:05:41	14:30:11	10:17:44			13:18:08	
09993	141	31	2149 Jul 20	18:38:11	Partial	-0.5315	0.8700	333.1	193.2		15:51:38	21:24:44	17:01:35			20:14:47	
10037	141	32	2167 Aug 01	1:28:59	Total	-0.4536	1.0108	340.5	203.6	16.6	22:38:44	4:19:14	23:47:11	1:20:41	1:37:17	3:10:47	
10080	141	33	2185 Aug 11	8:20:59	Total	-0.3774	1.1482	346.9	212.0	59.3	5:27:32	11:14:26	6:34:59	7:51:20	8:50:38	10:06:59	
10123	141	34	2203 Aug 23	15:15:12	Total	-0.3039	1.2806	352.2	218.6	78.1	12:19:06	18:11:18	13:25:54	14:36:09	15:54:15	17:04:30	
10167	141	35	2221 Sep 02	22:13:42	Total	-0.2348	1.4048	356.6	223.5	89.7	19:15:24	1:12:00	20:21:57	21:28:51	22:58:33	0:05:27	
10212	141	36	2239 Sep 14	5:17:34	Total	-0.1708	1.5194	360.2	227.0	97.0	2:17:28	8:17:40	3:24:04	4:29:04	6:06:04	7:11:04	
10257	141	37	2257 Sep 24	12:27:34	Total	-0.1123	1.6239	363.1	229.3	101.4	9:26:01	15:29:07	10:32:55	11:36:52	13:18:16	14:22:13	
10303	141	38	2275 Oct 05	19:44:07	Total	-0.0599	1.7172	365.3	230.8	103.7	16:41:28	22:46:46	17:48:43	18:52:16	20:35:58	21:39:31	
10350	141	39	2293 Oct 16	3:08:18	Total	-0.0144	1.7979	367.1	231.6	104.6	0:04:45	6:11:51	1:12:30	2:16:00	4:00:36	5:04:06	
10396	141	40	2311 Oct 28	10:40:16	Total	0.0241	1.7773	368.6	231.9	104.5	7:35:58	13:44:34	8:44:19	9:48:01	11:32:31	12:36:13	
10442	141	41	2329 Nov 07	18:18:33	Total	0.0568	1.7146	369.8	231.9	103.7	15:13:39	21:23:27	16:22:36	17:26:42	19:10:24	20:14:30	
10488	141	42	2347 Nov 19	2:04:59	Total	0.0825	1.6651	370.8	231.8	102.7	22:59:35	5:10:23	0:09:05	1:13:38	2:56:20	4:00:53	
10533	141	43	2365 Nov 29	9:57:07	Total	0.1031	1.6251	371.8	231.6	101.7	6:51:13	13:03:01	8:01:19	9:06:16	10:47:58	11:52:55	
10578	141	44	2383 Dec 10	17:55:40	Total	0.1179	1.5961	372.6	231.5	100.8	14:49:22	21:01:58	15:59:55	17:05:16	18:46:04	19:51:25	
10623	141	45	2401 Dec 21	1:56:07	Total	0.1306	1.5711	373.3	231.4	99.9	22:49:28	5:02:46	0:00:25	1:06:10	2:46:04	3:51:49	
10668	141	46	2420 Jan 01	10:00:56	Total	0.1394	1.5539	374.0	231.4	99.2	6:53:56	13:07:56	8:05:14	9:11:20	10:50:32	11:56:38	
10712	141	47	2438 Jan 11	18:05:30	Total	0.1483	1.5366	374.5	231.3	98.5	14:58:15	21:12:45	16:09:51	17:16:15	18:54:45	20:01:09	
10756	141	48	2456 Jan 23	2:10:08	Total	0.1568	1.5206	374.9	231.3	97.9	23:02:41	5:17:35	0:14:29	1:21:11	2:59:05	4:05:47	
10798	141	49	2474 Feb 02	10:11:05	Total	0.1681	1.4998	375.0	231.1	96.9	7:03:35	13:18:35	8:15:32	9:22:38	10:59:32	12:06:38	
10839	141	50	2492 Feb 13	18:09:20	Total	0.1814	1.4757	375.0	230.7	95.6	15:01:50	21:16:50	16:13:59	17:21:32	18:57:08	20:04:41	
10880	141	51	2510 Feb 25	2:01:15	Total	0.1998	1.4426	374.6	230.1	93.7	22:53:57	5:08:33	0:06:12	1:14:24	2:48:06	3:56:18	
10920	141	52	2528 Mar 07	9:46:47	Total	0.2233	1.4003	373.9	229.1	90.8	6:39:50	12:53:44	7:52:14	9:01:23	10:32:11	11:41:20	
10961	141	53	2546 Mar 18	17:24:17	Total	0.2534	1.3462	372.7	227.5	86.4	14:17:56	20:30:38	15:30:32	16:41:05	18:07:29	19:18:02	
11003	141	54	2564 Mar 29	0:54:06	Total	0.2895	1.2813	371.1	225.2	79.9	21:48:33	3:59:39	23:01:30	0:14:09	1:34:03	2:46:42	
11044	141	55	2582 Apr 09	8:13:59	Total	0.3337	1.2017	368.7	221.9	69.7	5:09:38	11:18:20	6:23:02	7:39:08	8:48:50	10:04:56	
11084	141	56	2600 Apr 20	15:25:41	Total	0.3845	1.1101	365.5	217.3	53.2	12:22:56	18:28:26	13:37:02	14:59:05	15:52:17	17:14:20	
11124	141	57	2618 May 1	22:28:05	Total	0.4426	1.0049	361.4	211.1	11.6	19:27:23	1:28:47	20:42:32	22:22:17	22:33:53	0:13:38	
11165	141	58	2636 May 12	5:23:36	Partial	0.5064	0.8894	356.1	202.9		2:25:33	8:21:39	3:42:09			7:05:03	
11206	141	59	2654 May 23	12:09:21	Partial	0.5779	0.7597	349.4	191.8		9:14:39	15:04:03	10:33:27			13:45:15	
11248	141	60	2672 Jun 02	18:50:39	Partial	0.6528	0.6238	341.3	177.8		16:00:00	21:41:18	17:21:45			20:19:33	
11291	141	61	2690 Jun 14	1:25:03	Partial	0.7329	0.4780	331.4	159.2		22:39:21	4:10:45	0:05:27			2:44:39	
11334	141	62	2708 Jun 25	7:57:36	Partial	0.8147	0.3292	319.9	135.1		5:17:39	10:37:33	6:50:03			9:05:09	
11376	141	63	2726 Jul 06	14:25:33	Partial	0.9000	0.1736	306.2	100.2		11:52:27	16:58:39	13:35:27			15:15:39	
11418	141	64	2744 Jul 16	20:55:09	Partial	0.9841	0.0202	290.8	34.9		18:29:45	23:20:33	20:37:42			21:12:36	
11462	141	65	2762 Jul 28	3:24:16	Penumbral	1.0681	-0.1333	273.2			1:07:40	5:40:52					
11506	141	66	2780 Aug 07	9:56:19	Penumbral	1.1498	-0.2829	253.5			7:49:34	12:03:04					
11552	141	67	2798 Aug 18	16:31:28	Penumbral	1.2293	-0.4284	231.4			14:35:46	18:27:10					
11598	141	68	2816 Aug 28	23:13:01	Penumbral	1.3037	-0.5648	207.2			21:29:25	0:56:37					
11646	141	69	2834 Sep 09	6:01:06	Penumbral	1.3730	-0.6920	180.6			4:30:48	7:31:24					
11692	141	70	2852 Sep 19	12:56:17	Penumbral	1.4368	-0.8093	150.6			11:40:59	14:11:35					
11738	141	71	2870 Sep 30	20:00:43	Penumbral	1.4935	-0.9136	116.5			19:02:28	20:58:58					
11784	141	72	2888 Oct 11	3:14:10	Penumbral	1.5434	-1.0055	72.9			2:37:43	3:50:37					

== See also ==
- List of lunar eclipses
  - List of Saros series for lunar eclipses
