= May 2003 lunar eclipse =

Total lunar eclipse 16 May 2003

- Total eclipse
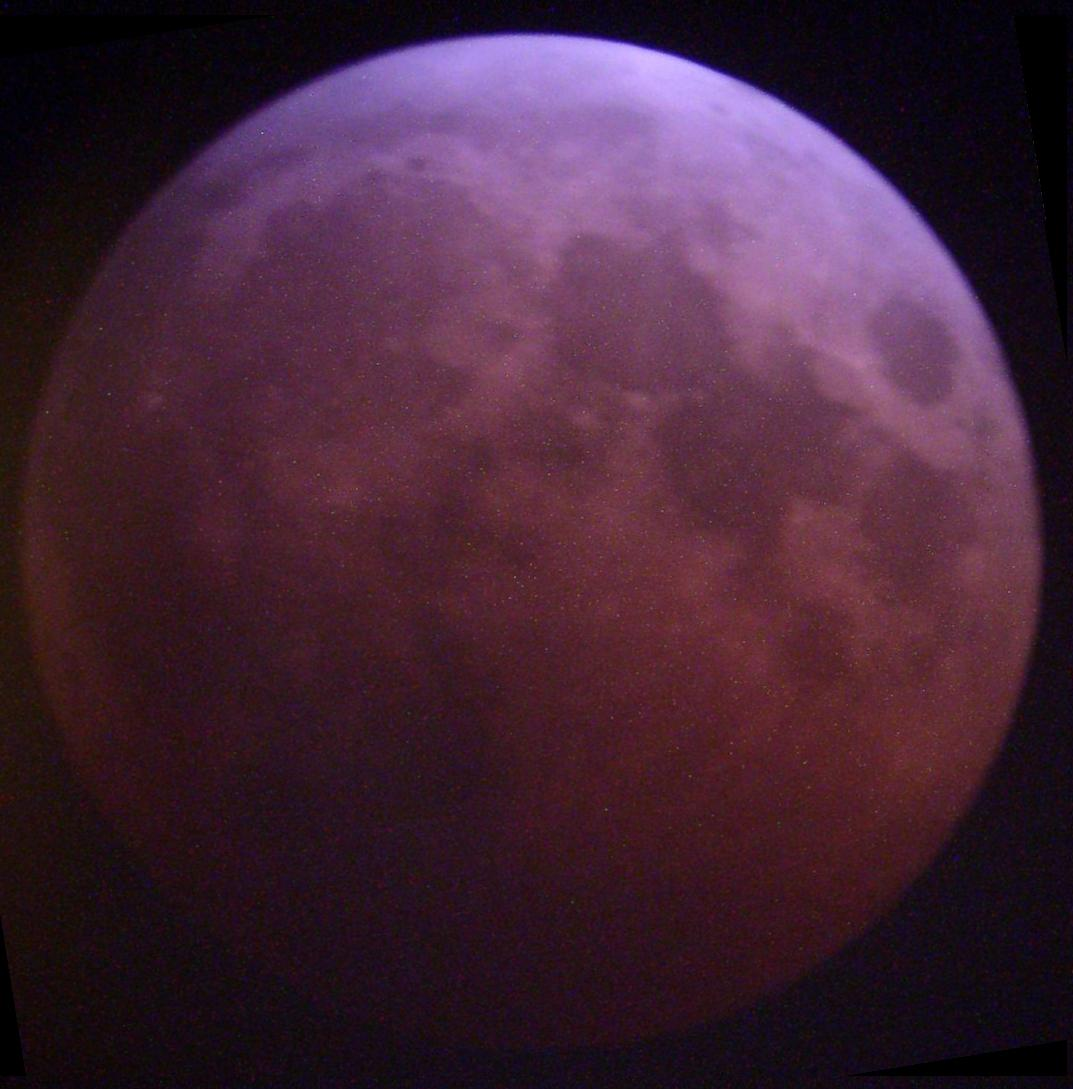
- Totality as viewed from Minneapolis, MN, 3:17 UTC
- Date: May 16, 2003
- Gamma: 0.4123
- Magnitude: 1.1294
- Saros cycle: 121 (54 of 82)
- Totality: 51 minutes, 12 seconds
- Partiality: 193 minutes, 53 seconds
- Penumbral: 306 minutes, 31 seconds
Contacts (UTC)
- P1: 1:06:53
- U1: 2:03:11
- U2: 3:14:26
- Greatest: 3:40:09
- U3: 4:05:51
- U4: 5:17:05
- P4: 6:13:24

A total lunar eclipse occurred at the Moon's descending node of orbit on Friday, May 16, 2003, with an umbral magnitude of 1.1294. A lunar eclipse occurs when the Moon moves into the Earth's shadow, causing the Moon to be darkened. A total lunar eclipse occurs when the Moon's near side entirely passes into the Earth's umbral shadow. Unlike a solar eclipse, which can only be viewed from a relatively small area of the world, a lunar eclipse may be viewed from anywhere on the night side of Earth. A total lunar eclipse can last up to nearly two hours, while a total solar eclipse lasts only a few minutes at any given place, because the Moon's shadow is smaller. Occurring only about 15 hours after perigee (on May 15, 2003, at 11:40 UTC), the Moon's apparent diameter was larger.

This lunar eclipse marks the beginning of a tetrad, with four total lunar eclipses in series, the others being on November 9, 2003; May 4, 2004; and October 28, 2004. The previous series was in 1985 and 1986, starting with the May 1985 lunar eclipse. The next series was in 2014 and 2015, starting with the April 2014 lunar eclipse.

== Visibility ==
The eclipse was completely visible over eastern North America, South America, the Caribbean, Antarctica, and west Africa, seen rising over western North America and the Pacific Ocean and setting over Europe, west Asia, and much of Africa.

Hourly motion shown right to left
The moon's path across the Earth's shadow near its descending node in Libra.

== Gallery ==
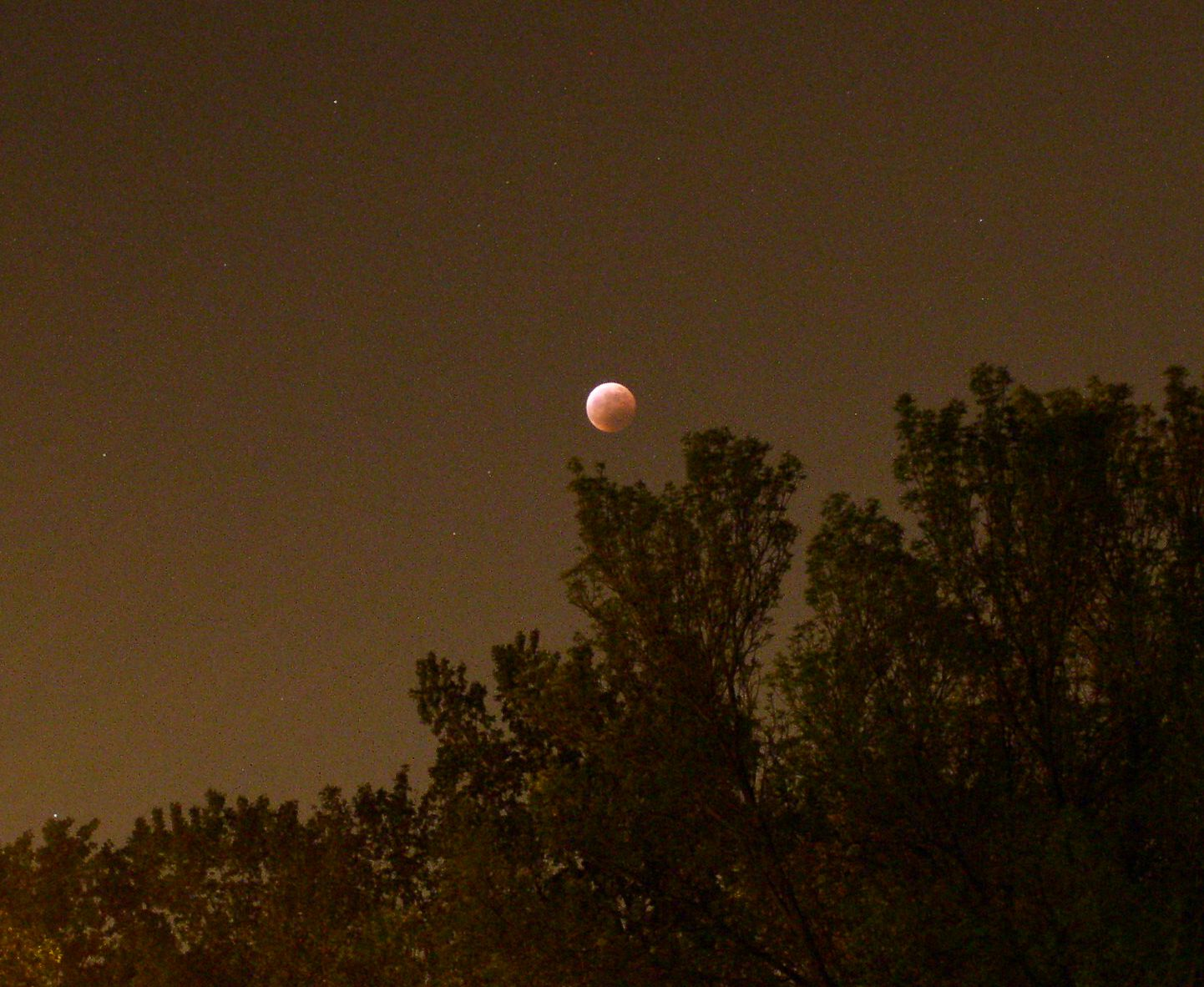
Wide Angle view from Minneapolis at 3:35 UTC, near greatest eclipse

== Eclipse details ==
Shown below is a table displaying details about this particular solar eclipse. It describes various parameters pertaining to this eclipse.

May 16, 2003 Lunar Eclipse Parameters
Parameter	Value
Penumbral Magnitude	2.07649
Umbral Magnitude	1.12938
Gamma	0.41234
Sun Right Ascension	03h30m07.2s
Sun Declination	+18°59'20.2"
Sun Semi-Diameter	15'49.2"
Sun Equatorial Horizontal Parallax	08.7"
Moon Right Ascension	15h30m43.0s
Moon Declination	-18°35'31.7"
Moon Semi-Diameter	16'42.2"
Moon Equatorial Horizontal Parallax	1°01'18.2"
ΔT	64.4 s

== Eclipse season ==
This eclipse is part of an eclipse season, a period, roughly every six months, when eclipses occur. Only two (or occasionally three) eclipse seasons occur each year, and each season lasts about 35 days and repeats just short of six months (173 days) later; thus two full eclipse seasons always occur each year. Either two or three eclipses happen each eclipse season. In the sequence below, each eclipse is separated by a fortnight.

Eclipse season of May 2003
May 16 Descending node (full moon)	May 31 Ascending node (new moon)
Total lunar eclipse Lunar Saros 121	Annular solar eclipse Solar Saros 147

== Related eclipses ==
=== Eclipses in 2003 ===
- A total lunar eclipse on May 16.
- An annular solar eclipse on May 31.
- A total lunar eclipse on November 9.
- A total solar eclipse on November 23.

=== Metonic ===
- Preceded by: Lunar eclipse of July 28, 1999
- Followed by: Lunar eclipse of March 3, 2007

=== Tzolkinex ===
- Preceded by: Lunar eclipse of April 4, 1996
- Followed by: Lunar eclipse of June 26, 2010

=== Half-Saros ===
- Preceded by: Solar eclipse of May 10, 1994
- Followed by: Solar eclipse of May 20, 2012

=== Tritos ===
- Preceded by: Lunar eclipse of June 15, 1992
- Followed by: Lunar eclipse of April 15, 2014

=== Lunar Saros 121 ===
- Preceded by: Lunar eclipse of May 4, 1985
- Followed by: Lunar eclipse of May 26, 2021

=== Inex ===
- Preceded by: Lunar eclipse of June 4, 1974
- Followed by: Lunar eclipse of April 25, 2032

=== Triad ===
- Preceded by: Lunar eclipse of July 15, 1916
- Followed by: Lunar eclipse of March 15, 2090

=== Lunar eclipses of 2002–2005 ===
This eclipse is a member of a semester series. An eclipse in a semester series of lunar eclipses repeats approximately every 177 days and 4 hours (a semester) at alternating nodes of the Moon's orbit.

The penumbral lunar eclipse on June 24, 2002 occurs in the previous lunar year eclipse set.

Lunar eclipse series sets from 2002 to 2005
Descending node				Ascending node			
Saros	Date Viewing	Type Chart	Gamma	Saros	Date Viewing	Type Chart	Gamma
111	2002 May 26	Penumbral	1.1759	116	2002 Nov 20	Penumbral	−1.1127
121	2003 May 16	Total	0.4123	126	2003 Nov 09	Total	−0.4319
131	2004 May 04	Total	−0.3132	136	2004 Oct 28	Total	0.2846
141	2005 Apr 24	Penumbral	−1.0885	146	2005 Oct 17	Partial	0.9796

=== Metonic series ===
The Metonic cycle repeats nearly exactly every 19 years and represents a Saros cycle plus one lunar year. Because it occurs on the same calendar date, the Earth's shadow will be in nearly the same location relative to the background stars.

1. 1984 May 15.19 - penumbral (111); 2. 2003 May 16.15 - total (121); 3. 2022 May 16.17 - total (131); 4. 2041 May 16.03 - penumbral (141)	1. 1984 Nov 08.75 - penumbral (116); 2. 2003 Nov 09.05 - total (126); 3. 2022 Nov 08.46 - total (136); 4. 2041 Nov 08.19 - partial (146); 5. 2060 Nov 08.17 - penumbral (156)

=== Saros 121 ===
This eclipse is a part of Saros series 121, repeating every 18 years, 11 days, and containing 82 events. The series started with a penumbral lunar eclipse on October 6, 1047. It contains partial eclipses from May 10, 1408 through July 3, 1498; total eclipses from July 13, 1516 through May 26, 2021; and a second set of partial eclipses from June 6, 2039 through August 11, 2147. The series ends at member 82 as a penumbral eclipse on March 18, 2508.

The longest duration of totality was produced by member 43 at 100 minutes, 29 seconds on October 18, 1660. All eclipses in this series occur at the Moon’s descending node of orbit.

Greatest	First			
The greatest eclipse of the series occurred on 1660 Oct 18, lasting 100 minutes, 29 seconds.	Penumbral	Partial	Total	Central
The greatest eclipse of the series occurred on 1660 Oct 18, lasting 100 minutes, 29 seconds.	1047 Oct 06	1408 May 10	1516 Jul 13	1570 Aug 15
The greatest eclipse of the series occurred on 1660 Oct 18, lasting 100 minutes, 29 seconds.	Last			
The greatest eclipse of the series occurred on 1660 Oct 18, lasting 100 minutes, 29 seconds.	Central	Total	Partial	Penumbral
The greatest eclipse of the series occurred on 1660 Oct 18, lasting 100 minutes, 29 seconds.	1949 Apr 13	2021 May 26	2147 Aug 11	2508 Mar 18

Eclipses are tabulated in three columns; every third eclipse in the same column is one exeligmos apart, so they all cast shadows over approximately the same parts of the Earth.

Series members 43–64 occur between 1801 and 2200:
43	44	45
1805 Jan 15	1823 Jan 26	1841 Feb 06
46	47	48
1859 Feb 17	1877 Feb 27	1895 Mar 11
49	50	51
1913 Mar 22	1931 Apr 02	1949 Apr 13
52	53	54
1967 Apr 24	1985 May 04	2003 May 16
55	56	57
2021 May 26	2039 Jun 06	2057 Jun 17
58	59	60
2075 Jun 28	2093 Jul 08	2111 Jul 21
61	62	63
2129 Jul 31	2147 Aug 11	2165 Aug 21
64
2183 Sep 02

=== Tritos series ===
This eclipse is a part of a tritos cycle, repeating at alternating nodes every 135 synodic months (≈ 3986.63 days, or 11 years minus 1 month). Their appearance and longitude are irregular due to a lack of synchronization with the anomalistic month (period of perigee), but groupings of 3 tritos cycles (≈ 33 years minus 3 months) come close (≈ 434.044 anomalistic months), so eclipses are similar in these groupings.

Series members between 1801 and 2200
1806 Nov 26 (Saros 103)		1828 Sep 23 (Saros 105)	1839 Aug 24 (Saros 106)	1850 Jul 24 (Saros 107)
1861 Jun 22 (Saros 108)	1872 May 22 (Saros 109)	1883 Apr 22 (Saros 110)	1894 Mar 21 (Saros 111)	1905 Feb 19 (Saros 112)
1916 Jan 20 (Saros 113)	1926 Dec 19 (Saros 114)	1937 Nov 18 (Saros 115)	1948 Oct 18 (Saros 116)	1959 Sep 17 (Saros 117)
1970 Aug 17 (Saros 118)	1981 Jul 17 (Saros 119)	1992 Jun 15 (Saros 120)	2003 May 16 (Saros 121)	2014 Apr 15 (Saros 122)
2025 Mar 14 (Saros 123)	2036 Feb 11 (Saros 124)	2047 Jan 12 (Saros 125)	2057 Dec 11 (Saros 126)	2068 Nov 09 (Saros 127)
2079 Oct 10 (Saros 128)	2090 Sep 08 (Saros 129)	2101 Aug 09 (Saros 130)	2112 Jul 09 (Saros 131)	2123 Jun 09 (Saros 132)
2134 May 08 (Saros 133)	2145 Apr 07 (Saros 134)	2156 Mar 07 (Saros 135)	2167 Feb 04 (Saros 136)	2178 Jan 04 (Saros 137)
2188 Dec 04 (Saros 138)	2199 Nov 02 (Saros 139)			

=== Inex series ===
This eclipse is a part of the long period inex cycle, repeating at alternating nodes, every 358 synodic months (≈ 10,571.95 days, or 29 years minus 20 days). Their appearance and longitude are irregular due to a lack of synchronization with the anomalistic month (period of perigee). However, groupings of 3 inex cycles (≈ 87 years minus 2 months) comes close (≈ 1,151.02 anomalistic months), so eclipses are similar in these groupings.

Series members between 1801 and 2200
1829 Sep 13 (Saros 115)	1858 Aug 24 (Saros 116)	1887 Aug 03 (Saros 117)
1916 Jul 15 (Saros 118)	1945 Jun 25 (Saros 119)	1974 Jun 04 (Saros 120)
2003 May 16 (Saros 121)	2032 Apr 25 (Saros 122)	2061 Apr 04 (Saros 123)
2090 Mar 15 (Saros 124)	2119 Feb 25 (Saros 125)	2148 Feb 04 (Saros 126)
2177 Jan 14 (Saros 127)

=== Half-Saros cycle ===
A lunar eclipse will be preceded and followed by solar eclipses by 9 years and 5.5 days (a half saros). This lunar eclipse is related to two annular solar eclipses of Solar Saros 128.

May 10, 1994	May 20, 2012

== See also ==
- List of lunar eclipses and List of 21st-century lunar eclipses
- November 2003 lunar eclipse
- October 2004 lunar eclipse
- May 2004 lunar eclipse
