= Solar Saros 148 =

Cycle of solar eclipses

Historic saros cycle animation

Saros cycle series 148 for solar eclipses occurs at the Moon's descending node, repeating every 18 years, 11 days, containing 75 eclipses, 43 of which are umbral (2 annular, 1 hybrid, and 40 total). The first eclipse in the series was on 21 September 1653 and the last will be on 12 December 2987. The most recent eclipse was an annular eclipse on 29 April 2014 and the next will be an annular eclipse on 9 May 2032.

The longest totality will be 5 minutes 23 seconds on 26 April 2609.

This solar saros is linked to Lunar Saros 141.

== Umbral eclipses ==
Umbral eclipses (annular, total and hybrid) can be further classified as either: 1) Central (two limits), 2) Central (one limit) or 3) Non-Central (one limit). The statistical distribution of these classes in Saros series 148 appears in the following table.

Classification	Number	Percent
All Umbral eclipses	43	100.00%
Central (two limits)	42	97.67%
Central (one limit)	0	0.00%
Non-central (one limit)	1	2.33%

== All eclipses ==
Saros	Member	Date	Time (Greatest) UTC	Type	Location Lat, Long	Gamma	Mag.	Width (km)	Duration (min:sec)	Ref
148	1	September 21, 1653	15:55:44	Partial	61S 149.7W	-1.545	0.0324			
148	2	October 2, 1671	23:13:22	Partial	61S 92.1E	-1.4952	0.1177			
148	3	October 13, 1689	6:40:02	Partial	61.2S 28.3W	-1.4517	0.192			
148	4	October 25, 1707	14:17:22	Partial	61.6S 151.3W	-1.4161	0.2528			
148	5	November 4, 1725	22:02:52	Partial	62.1S 83.5E	-1.3861	0.3038			
148	6	November 16, 1743	5:58:25	Partial	62.8S 44.4W	-1.3634	0.3424			
148	7	November 26, 1761	14:00:27	Partial	63.7S 174.2W	-1.3451	0.3732			
148	8	December 7, 1779	22:08:56	Partial	64.6S 54.2E	-1.3315	0.3962			
148	9	December 18, 1797	6:21:51	Partial	65.6S 79W	-1.3208	0.4142			
148	10	December 30, 1815	14:38:39	Partial	66.7S 146.4E	-1.3129	0.4273			
148	11	January 9, 1834	22:55:31	Partial	67.8S 11.3E	-1.3043	0.4418			
148	12	January 21, 1852	7:12:16	Partial	68.9S 124.3W	-1.2948	0.4577			
148	13	January 31, 1870	15:26:25	Partial	69.9S 100E	-1.2829	0.4781			
148	14	February 11, 1888	23:38:15	Partial	70.7S 35.7W	-1.2684	0.5029			
148	15	February 23, 1906	7:43:20	Partial	71.4S 170.3W	-1.2479	0.5386			
148	16	March 5, 1924	15:44:20	Partial	71.9S 55.6E	-1.2232	0.5819			
148	17	March 16, 1942	23:37:07	Partial	72.2S 76.8W	-1.1908	0.6393			
148	18	March 27, 1960	7:25:07	Partial	72.1S 151.9E	-1.1537	0.7058			
148	19	April 7, 1978	15:03:47	Partial	71.9S 23.3E	-1.1081	0.7883			
148	20	April 17, 1996	22:38:12	Partial	71.3S 104W	-1.058	0.8799			
148	21	April 29, 2014	6:04:33	Annular (Note: No southern limit)	70.6S 131.3E	-1.00001	0.9868	-	-	
148	22	May 9, 2032	13:26:42	Annular	51.3S 7.1W	-0.9375	0.9957	44	0m 22s	
148	23	May 20, 2050	20:42:50	Hybrid	40.1S 123.7W	-0.8688	1.0038	27	0m 21s	
148	24	May 31, 2068	3:56:39	Total	31S 123.2E	-0.797	1.011	63	1m 6s	
148	25	June 11, 2086	11:07:14	Total	23.2S 12.5E	-0.7215	1.0174	86	1m 48s	
148	26	June 22, 2104	18:16:21	Total	16.6S 96.8W	-0.6438	1.0231	103	2m 26s	
148	27	July 4, 2122	1:25:31	Total	11S 154.7E	-0.5649	1.028	114	2m 56s	
148	28	July 14, 2140	8:36:11	Total	6.7S 46.5E	-0.4861	1.0322	124	3m 18s	
148	29	July 25, 2158	15:49:17	Total	3.4S 61.8W	-0.4087	1.0356	131	3m 32s	
148	30	August 4, 2176	23:05:55	Total	1.3S 170.5W	-0.3333	1.0383	136	3m 40s	
148	31	August 16, 2194	6:28:08	Total	0.2S 79.6E	-0.2616	1.0403	139	3m 44s	
148	32	August 27, 2212	13:56:17	Total	0.1S 31.7W	-0.194	1.0416	142	3m 45s	
148	33	September 7, 2230	21:30:39	Total	0.7S 144.5W	-0.1309	1.0424	143	3m 44s	
148	34	September 18, 2248	5:13:07	Total	2S 100.6E	-0.0738	1.0426	143	3m 42s	
148	35	September 29, 2266	13:03:57	Total	3.7S 16.4W	-0.0233	1.0425	142	3m 40s	
148	36	October 9, 2284	21:03:48	Total	5.7S 135.8W	0.0205	1.042	140	3m 39s	
148	37	October 22, 2302	5:11:16	Total	7.8S 102.9E	0.0584	1.0413	139	3m 38s	
148	38	November 1, 2320	13:28:19	Total	9.8S 20.8W	0.0888	1.0406	136	3m 38s	
148	39	November 12, 2338	21:52:54	Total	11.7S 146.4W	0.1131	1.0399	134	3m 38s	
148	40	November 23, 2356	6:24:55	Total	13.2S 86.3E	0.1317	1.0394	133	3m 40s	
148	41	December 4, 2374	15:02:56	Total	14.1S 42.4W	0.1455	1.039	132	3m 42s	
148	42	December 14, 2392	23:46:26	Total	14.5S 172.4W	0.155	1.0391	133	3m 46s	
148	43	December 26, 2410	8:33:58	Total	14.1S 56.6E	0.1613	1.0395	134	3m 50s	
148	44	January 5, 2429	17:22:56	Total	13S 74.9W	0.1666	1.0404	137	3m 56s	
148	45	January 17, 2447	2:14:03	Total	11.1S 152.9E	0.1703	1.0417	141	4m 3s	
148	46	January 27, 2465	11:03:49	Total	8.3S 20.8E	0.1751	1.0435	147	4m 11s	
148	47	February 7, 2483	19:51:56	Total	4.8S 111.2W	0.1817	1.0457	155	4m 20s	
148	48	February 19, 2501	4:35:21	Total	0.6S 117.7E	0.1925	1.0483	163	4m 31s	
148	49	March 2, 2519	13:15:24	Total	4.2N 12.9W	0.2062	1.0511	173	4m 42s	
148	50	March 12, 2537	21:49:07	Total	9.5N 142.2W	0.2254	1.0542	184	4m 53s	
148	51	March 24, 2555	6:16:23	Total	15.2N 90E	0.2502	1.0574	195	5m 4s	
148	52	April 3, 2573	14:36:16	Total	21.4N 35.9W	0.2815	1.0606	207	5m 13s	
148	53	April 14, 2591	22:49:07	Total	27.7N 160W	0.3189	1.0637	220	5m 19s	
148	54	April 26, 2609	6:54:26	Total	34.2N 78.2E	0.3627	1.0665	233	5m 23s	
148	55	May 7, 2627	14:52:04	Total	40.8N 41W	0.4129	1.0688	246	5m 22s	
148	56	May 17, 2645	22:43:18	Total	47.4N 157.7W	0.4686	1.0707	261	5m 17s	
148	57	May 29, 2663	6:28:21	Total	53.7N 88.7E	0.5295	1.0719	276	5m 7s	
148	58	June 8, 2681	14:07:31	Total	59.7N 21.1W	0.5953	1.0724	294	4m 54s	
148	59	June 19, 2699	21:42:32	Total	64.9N 126.6W	0.6645	1.072	314	4m 38s	
148	60	July 1, 2717	5:13:30	Total	69.2N 133.9E	0.7368	1.0707	342	4m 20s	
148	61	July 12, 2735	12:43:11	Total	71.7N 40.5E	0.8101	1.0682	381	3m 59s	
148	62	July 22, 2753	20:10:02	Total	72.2N 46.7W	0.8853	1.0646	458	3m 35s	
148	63	August 3, 2771	3:38:34	Total	69.6N 129.5W	0.959	1.059	704	3m 5s	
148	64	August 13, 2789	11:07:04	Partial	62.1N 146.1E	1.0325	0.958			
148	65	August 24, 2807	18:39:28	Partial	61.7N 24.5E	1.1023	0.8227			
148	66	September 4, 2825	2:13:41	Partial	61.3N 97.3W	1.17	0.692			
148	67	September 15, 2843	9:54:00	Partial	61.2N 139.4E	1.2325	0.5724			
148	68	September 25, 2861	17:38:14	Partial	61.2N 15.1E	1.2912	0.4607			
148	69	October 7, 2879	1:29:04	Partial	61.3N 110.8W	1.3441	0.3612			
148	70	October 17, 2897	9:25:31	Partial	61.6N 121.9E	1.3918	0.2723			
148	71	October 29, 2915	17:29:53	Partial	62.1N 7.5W	1.4323	0.1978			
148	72	November 9, 2933	1:40:31	Partial	62.6N 138.6W	1.4676	0.1339			
148	73	November 20, 2951	9:57:41	Partial	63.4N 88.5E	1.497	0.0814			
148	74	November 30, 2969	18:20:54	Partial	64.2N 46.2W	1.521	0.0393			
148	75	December 12, 2987	2:50:04	Partial	65.2N 177.4E	1.5396	0.0074			
