= June 2012 lunar eclipse =

Partial lunar eclipse on June 4, 2012

- Partial eclipse
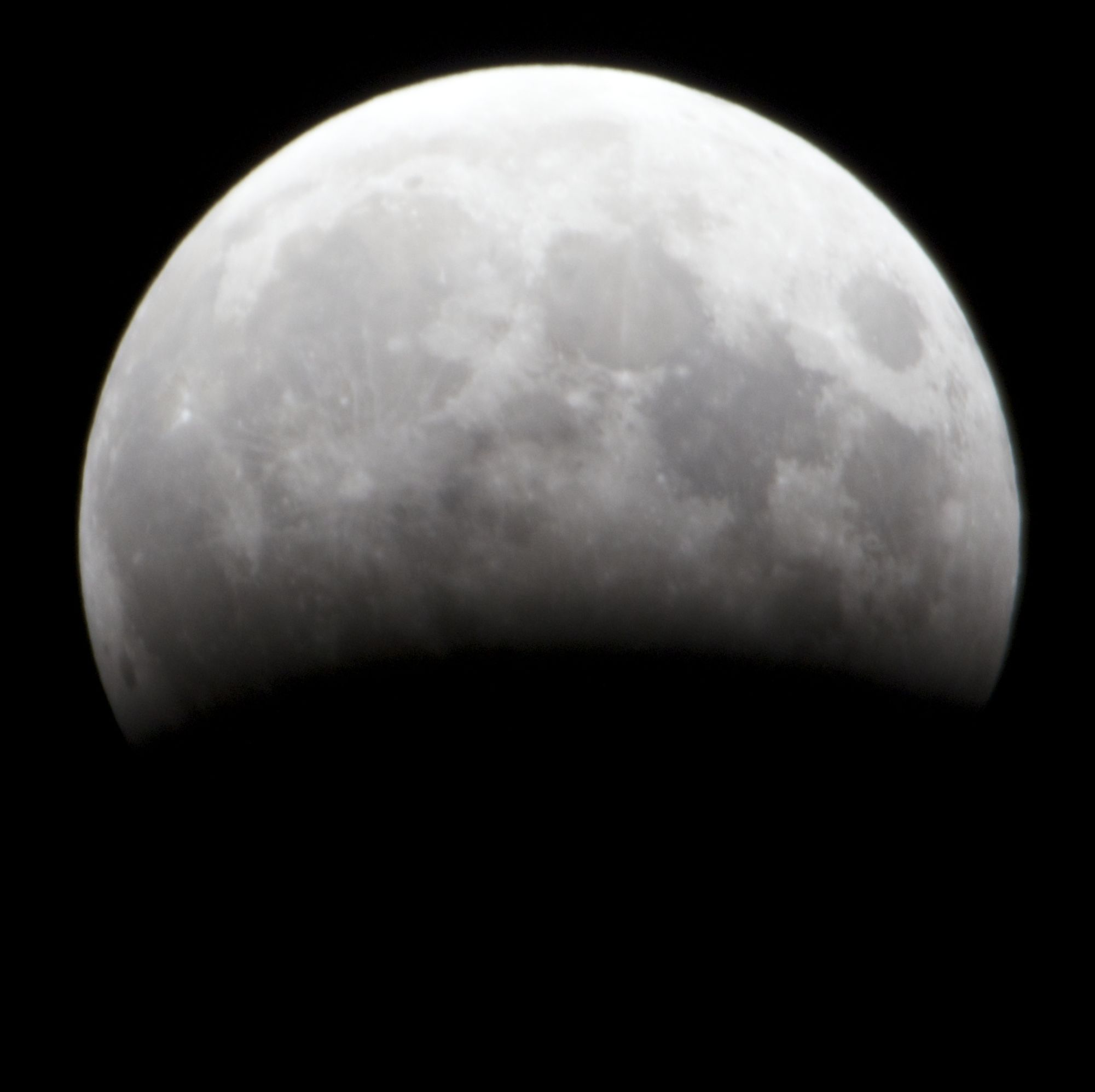
- Totality as viewed from Brisbane, Australia, 11:06 UTC
- Date: June 4, 2012
- Gamma: 0.8248
- Magnitude: 0.3718
- Saros cycle: 140 (25 of 80)
- Partiality: 126 minutes, 35 seconds
- Penumbral: 270 minutes, 2 seconds
Contacts (UTC)
- P1: 8:48:11
- U1: 9:59:53
- Greatest: 11:03:12
- U4: 12:06:28
- P4: 13:18:13

A partial lunar eclipse occurred at the Moon’s ascending node of orbit on Monday, June 4, 2012, with an umbral magnitude of 0.3718. A lunar eclipse occurs when the Moon moves into the Earth's shadow, causing the Moon to be darkened. A partial lunar eclipse occurs when one part of the Moon is in the Earth's umbra, while the other part is in the Earth's penumbra. Unlike a solar eclipse, which can only be viewed from a relatively small area of the world, a lunar eclipse may be viewed from anywhere on the night side of Earth. Occurring about 1.1 days after perigee (on June 3, 2012, at 9:15 UTC), the Moon's apparent diameter was larger.

== Visibility ==
The eclipse was completely visible over Australia, Antarctica, and the Pacific Ocean, seen rising over east Asia and setting over North and South America.

Hourly motion shown right to left	The Moon's hourly motion across the Earth's shadow in the constellation of Ophiuchus (north of Scorpius).
Visibility map

== Gallery ==
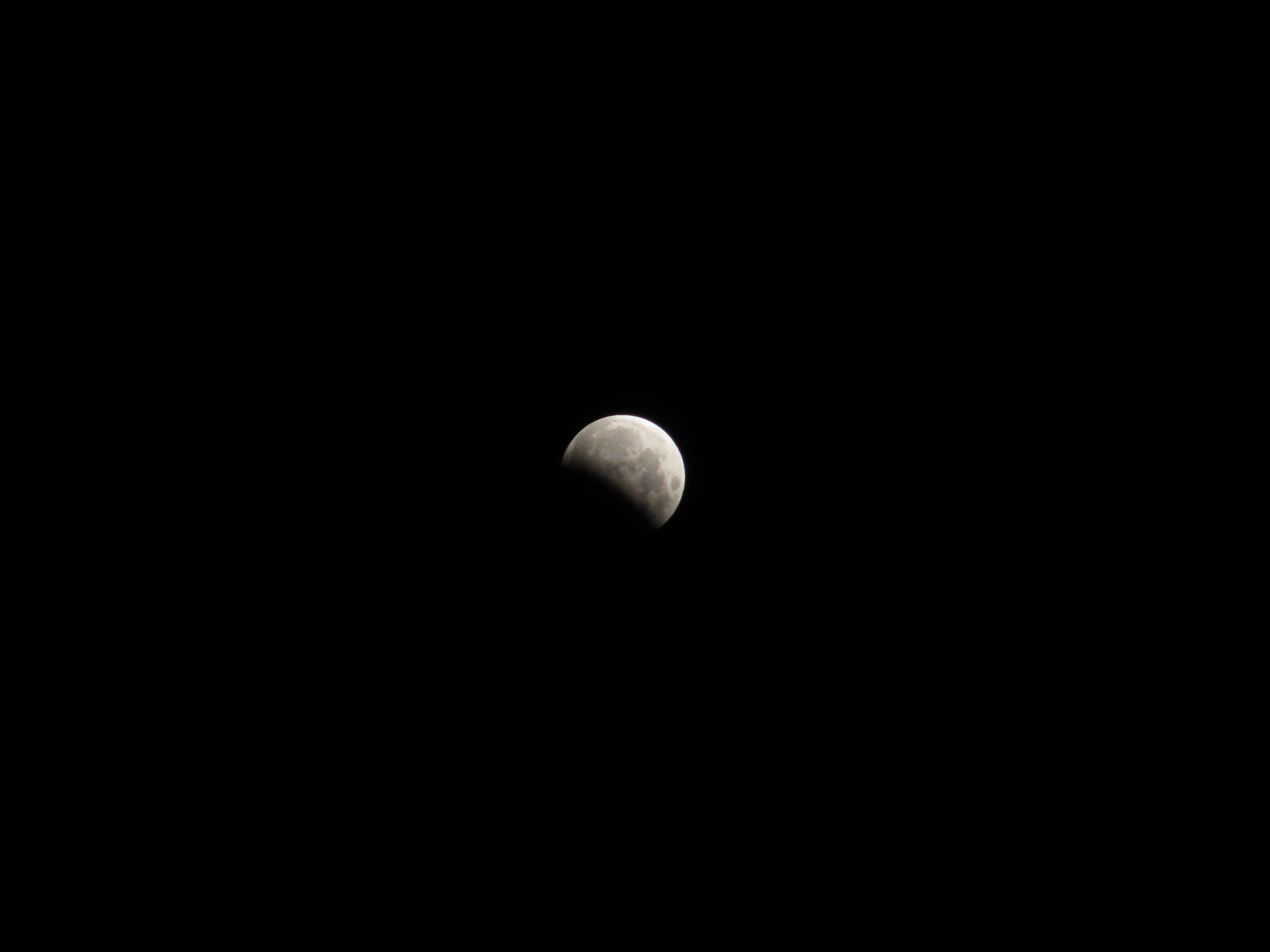
Elko, Nevada, 10:58 UTC

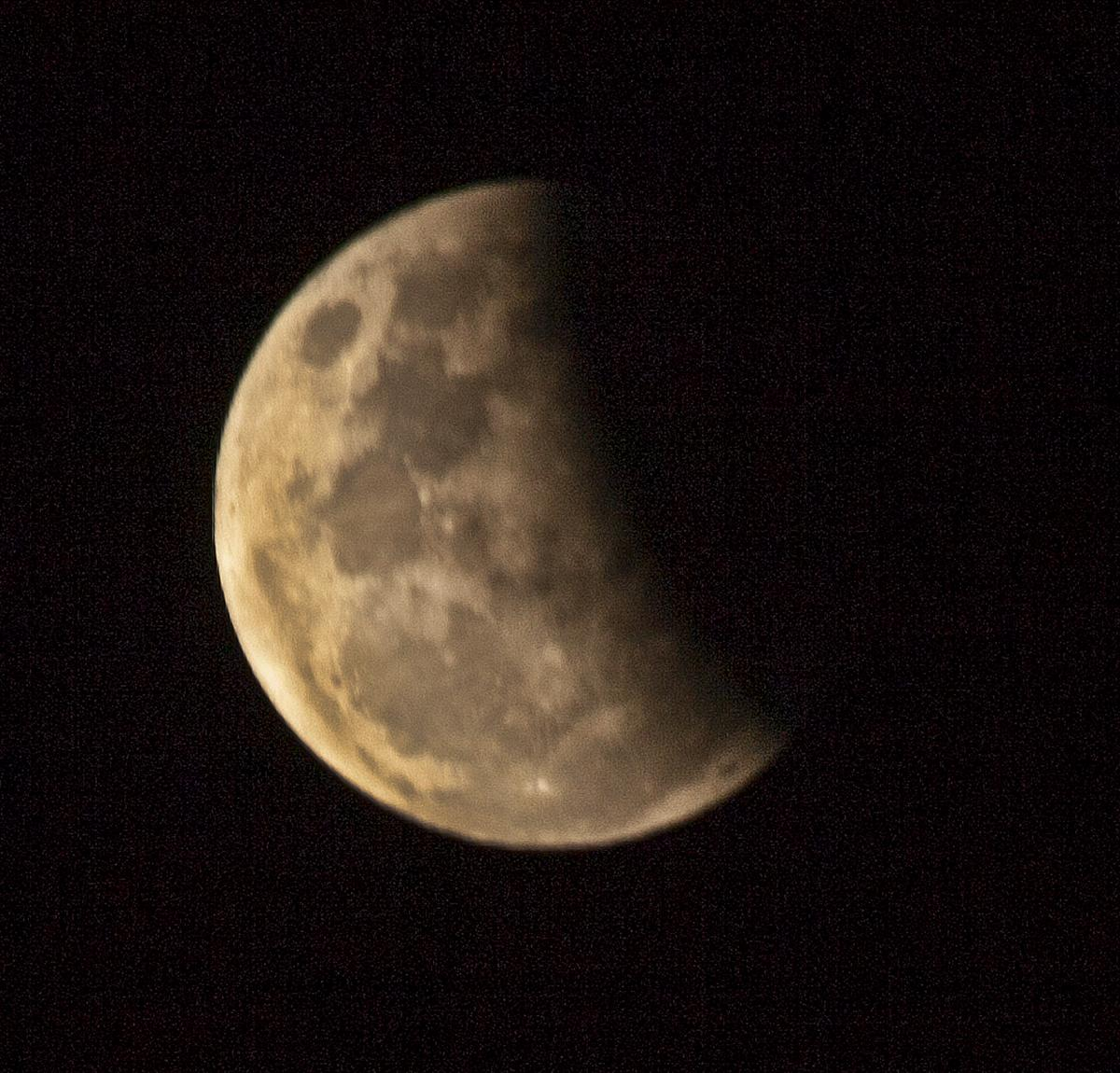
Redcliffe, Queensland, 11:06 UTC

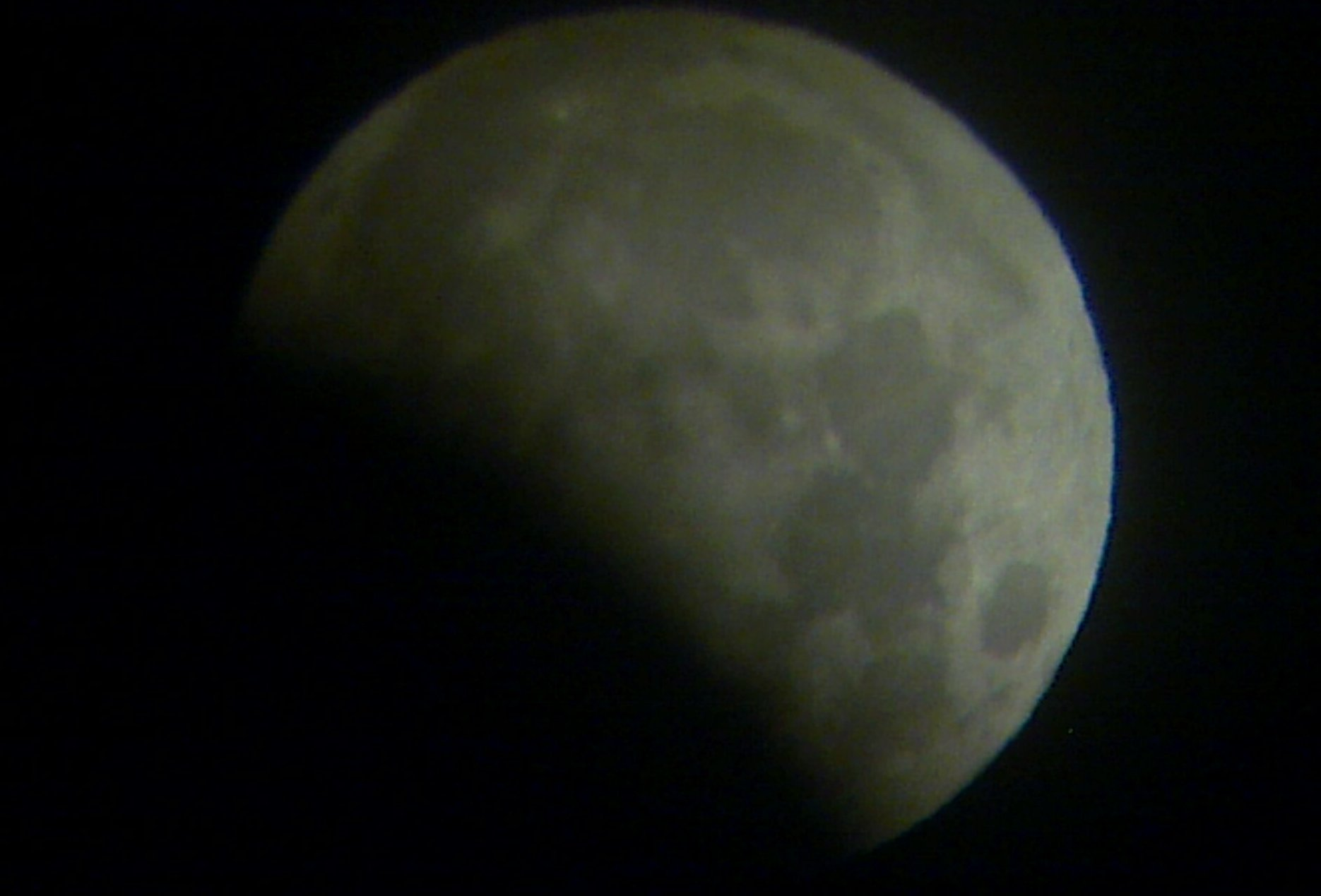
Albuquerque, New Mexico, 11:20 UTC

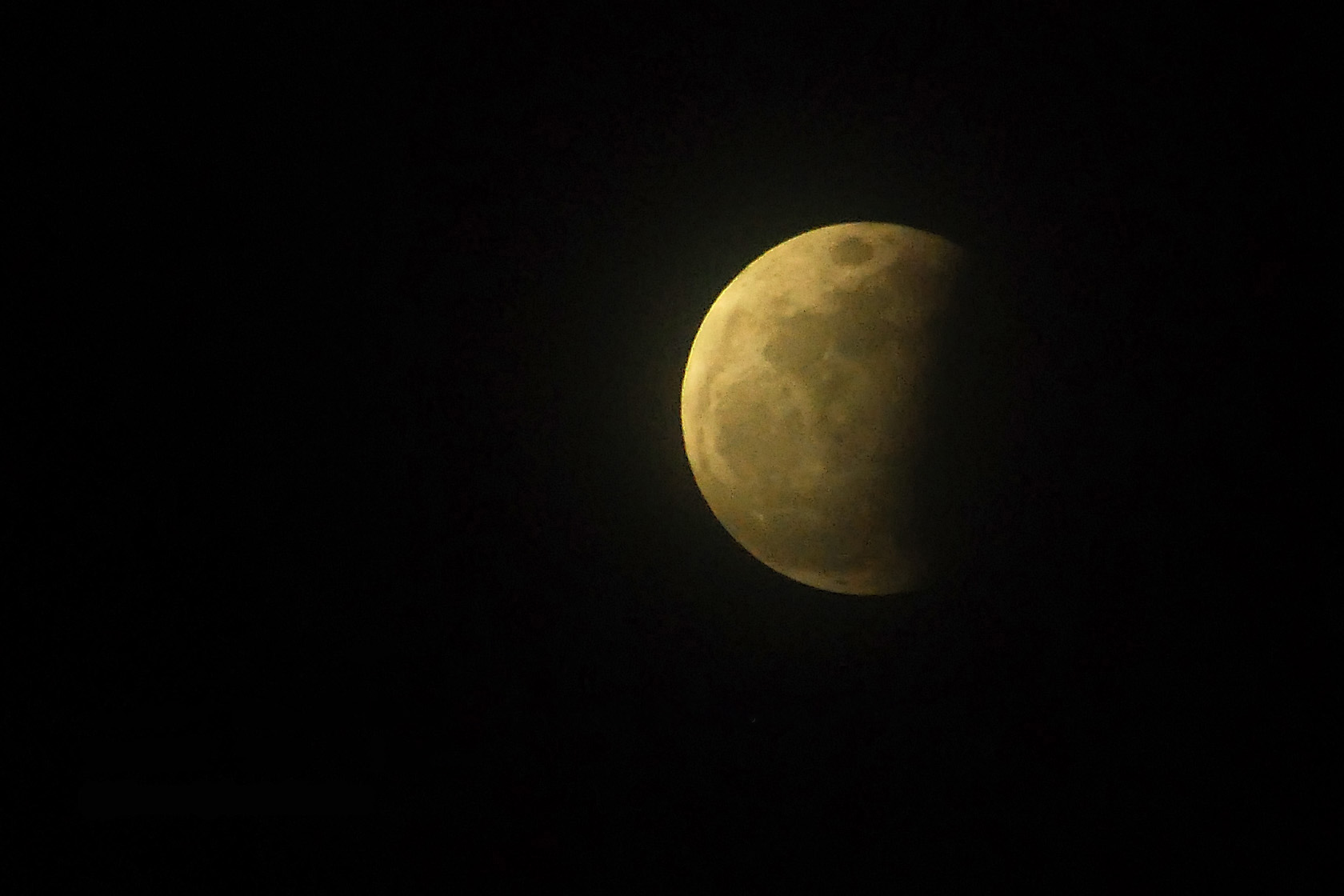
Marikina, Philippines, 11:33 UTC

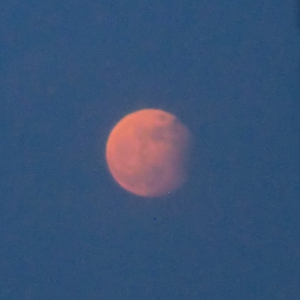
From Beijing at moonrise, 12:09 UTC

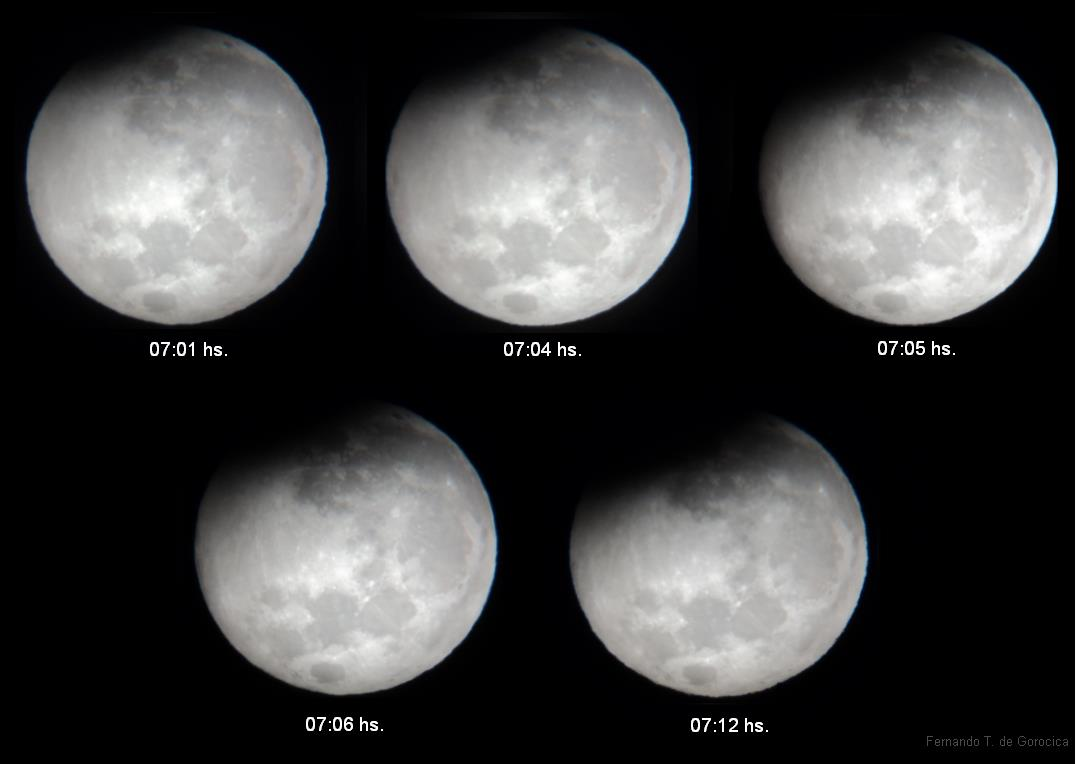
Time lapse image from Villa Gesell, Argentina

== Eclipse details ==
Shown below is a table displaying details about this particular solar eclipse. It describes various parameters pertaining to this eclipse.

June 4, 2012 Lunar Eclipse Parameters
Parameter	Value
Penumbral Magnitude	1.31975
Umbral Magnitude	0.37184
Gamma	0.82480
Sun Right Ascension	04h51m33.3s
Sun Declination	+22°30'16.0"
Sun Semi-Diameter	15'45.9"
Sun Equatorial Horizontal Parallax	08.7"
Moon Right Ascension	16h51m37.6s
Moon Declination	-21°39'56.2"
Moon Semi-Diameter	16'37.9"
Moon Equatorial Horizontal Parallax	1°01'02.3"
ΔT	66.8 s

== Eclipse season ==
This eclipse is part of an eclipse season, a period, roughly every six months, when eclipses occur. Only two (or occasionally three) eclipse seasons occur each year, and each season lasts about 35 days and repeats just short of six months (173 days) later; thus two full eclipse seasons always occur each year. Either two or three eclipses happen each eclipse season. In the sequence below, each eclipse is separated by a fortnight.

Eclipse season of May–June 2012
May 20 Descending node (new moon)	June 4 Ascending node (full moon)
Annular solar eclipse Solar Saros 128	Partial lunar eclipse Lunar Saros 140

== Related eclipses ==
=== Eclipses in 2012 ===
- An annular solar eclipse on May 20.
- A partial lunar eclipse on June 4.
- A total solar eclipse on November 13.
- A penumbral lunar eclipse on November 28.

=== Metonic ===
- Preceded by: Lunar eclipse of August 16, 2008
- Followed by: Lunar eclipse of March 23, 2016

=== Tzolkinex ===
- Preceded by: Lunar eclipse of April 24, 2005
- Followed by: Lunar eclipse of July 16, 2019

=== Half-Saros ===
- Preceded by: Solar eclipse of May 31, 2003
- Followed by: Solar eclipse of June 10, 2021

=== Tritos ===
- Preceded by: Lunar eclipse of July 5, 2001
- Followed by: Lunar eclipse of May 5, 2023

=== Lunar Saros 140 ===
- Preceded by: Lunar eclipse of May 25, 1994
- Followed by: Lunar eclipse of June 15, 2030

=== Inex ===
- Preceded by: Lunar eclipse of June 25, 1983
- Followed by: Lunar eclipse of May 16, 2041

=== Triad ===
- Preceded by: Lunar eclipse of August 4, 1925
- Followed by: Lunar eclipse of April 5, 2099

=== Lunar eclipses of 2009–2013 ===
This eclipse is a member of a semester series. An eclipse in a semester series of lunar eclipses repeats approximately every 177 days and 4 hours (a semester) at alternating nodes of the Moon's orbit.

The penumbral lunar eclipses on February 9, 2009 and August 6, 2009 occur in the previous lunar year eclipse set, and the lunar eclipses on April 25, 2013 (partial) and October 18, 2013 (penumbral) occur in the next lunar year eclipse set.

Lunar eclipse series sets from 2009 to 2013
Ascending node				Descending node			
Saros	Date Viewing	Type Chart	Gamma	Saros	Date Viewing	Type Chart	Gamma
110	2009 Jul 07	Penumbral	−1.4916	115	2009 Dec 31	Partial	0.9766
120	2010 Jun 26	Partial	−0.7091	125	2010 Dec 21	Total	0.3214
130	2011 Jun 15	Total	0.0897	135	2011 Dec 10	Total	−0.3882
140	2012 Jun 04	Partial	0.8248	145	2012 Nov 28	Penumbral	−1.0869
150	2013 May 25	Penumbral	1.5351				

=== Saros 140 ===
This eclipse is a part of Saros series 140, repeating every 18 years, 11 days, and containing 77 events. The series started with a penumbral lunar eclipse on September 25, 1597. It contains partial eclipses from May 3, 1958 through July 17, 2084; total eclipses from July 30, 2102 through May 21, 2589; and a second set of partial eclipses from June 2, 2607 through August 7, 2715. The series ends at member 77 as a penumbral eclipse on January 6, 2968.

The longest duration of totality will be produced by member 38 at 98 minutes, 36 seconds on November 4, 2264. All eclipses in this series occur at the Moon’s ascending node of orbit.

Greatest	First			
The greatest eclipse of the series will occur on 2264 Nov 04, lasting 98 minutes, 36 seconds.	Penumbral	Partial	Total	Central
The greatest eclipse of the series will occur on 2264 Nov 04, lasting 98 minutes, 36 seconds.	1597 Sep 25	1958 May 03	2102 Jul 30	2156 Aug 30
The greatest eclipse of the series will occur on 2264 Nov 04, lasting 98 minutes, 36 seconds.	Last			
The greatest eclipse of the series will occur on 2264 Nov 04, lasting 98 minutes, 36 seconds.	Central	Total	Partial	Penumbral
The greatest eclipse of the series will occur on 2264 Nov 04, lasting 98 minutes, 36 seconds.	2535 Apr 19	2589 May 21	2715 Aug 07	2968 Jan 06

Eclipses are tabulated in three columns; every third eclipse in the same column is one exeligmos apart, so they all cast shadows over approximately the same parts of the Earth.

Series members 13–34 occur between 1801 and 2200:
13	14	15
1814 Feb 04	1832 Feb 16	1850 Feb 26
16	17	18
1868 Mar 08	1886 Mar 20	1904 Mar 31
19	20	21
1922 Apr 11	1940 Apr 22	1958 May 03
22	23	24
1976 May 13	1994 May 25	2012 Jun 04
25	26	27
2030 Jun 15	2048 Jun 26	2066 Jul 07
28	29	30
2084 Jul 17	2102 Jul 30	2120 Aug 09
31	32	33
2138 Aug 20	2156 Aug 30	2174 Sep 11
34
2192 Sep 21

=== Tritos series ===
This eclipse is a part of a tritos cycle, repeating at alternating nodes every 135 synodic months (≈ 3986.63 days, or 11 years minus 1 month). Their appearance and longitude are irregular due to a lack of synchronization with the anomalistic month (period of perigee), but groupings of 3 tritos cycles (≈ 33 years minus 3 months) come close (≈ 434.044 anomalistic months), so eclipses are similar in these groupings.

Series members between 1801 and 2187
1805 Jan 15 (Saros 121)	1815 Dec 16 (Saros 122)	1826 Nov 14 (Saros 123)	1837 Oct 13 (Saros 124)	1848 Sep 13 (Saros 125)
1859 Aug 13 (Saros 126)	1870 Jul 12 (Saros 127)	1881 Jun 12 (Saros 128)	1892 May 11 (Saros 129)	1903 Apr 12 (Saros 130)
1914 Mar 12 (Saros 131)	1925 Feb 08 (Saros 132)	1936 Jan 08 (Saros 133)	1946 Dec 08 (Saros 134)	1957 Nov 07 (Saros 135)
1968 Oct 06 (Saros 136)	1979 Sep 06 (Saros 137)	1990 Aug 06 (Saros 138)	2001 Jul 05 (Saros 139)	2012 Jun 04 (Saros 140)
2023 May 05 (Saros 141)	2034 Apr 03 (Saros 142)	2045 Mar 03 (Saros 143)	2056 Feb 01 (Saros 144)	2066 Dec 31 (Saros 145)
2077 Nov 29 (Saros 146)	2088 Oct 30 (Saros 147)	2099 Sep 29 (Saros 148)	2110 Aug 29 (Saros 149)	2121 Jul 30 (Saros 150)
2132 Jun 28 (Saros 151)	2143 May 28 (Saros 152)	2154 Apr 28 (Saros 153)		
2187 Jan 24 (Saros 156)

=== Inex series ===
This eclipse is a part of the long period inex cycle, repeating at alternating nodes, every 358 synodic months (≈ 10,571.95 days, or 29 years minus 20 days). Their appearance and longitude are irregular due to a lack of synchronization with the anomalistic month (period of perigee). However, groupings of 3 inex cycles (≈ 87 years minus 2 months) comes close (≈ 1,151.02 anomalistic months), so eclipses are similar in these groupings.

Series members between 1801 and 2200
1809 Oct 23 (Saros 133)	1838 Oct 03 (Saros 134)	1867 Sep 14 (Saros 135)
1896 Aug 23 (Saros 136)	1925 Aug 04 (Saros 137)	1954 Jul 16 (Saros 138)
1983 Jun 25 (Saros 139)	2012 Jun 04 (Saros 140)	2041 May 16 (Saros 141)
2070 Apr 25 (Saros 142)	2099 Apr 05 (Saros 143)	2128 Mar 16 (Saros 144)
2157 Feb 24 (Saros 145)	2186 Feb 04 (Saros 146)	

=== Half-Saros cycle ===
A lunar eclipse will be preceded and followed by solar eclipses by 9 years and 5.5 days (a half saros). This lunar eclipse is related to two annular solar eclipses of Solar Saros 147.

May 31, 2003	June 10, 2021

== See also ==
- List of lunar eclipses and List of 21st-century lunar eclipses
