= April 1940 lunar eclipse =

Penumbral lunar eclipse

- Penumbral eclipse
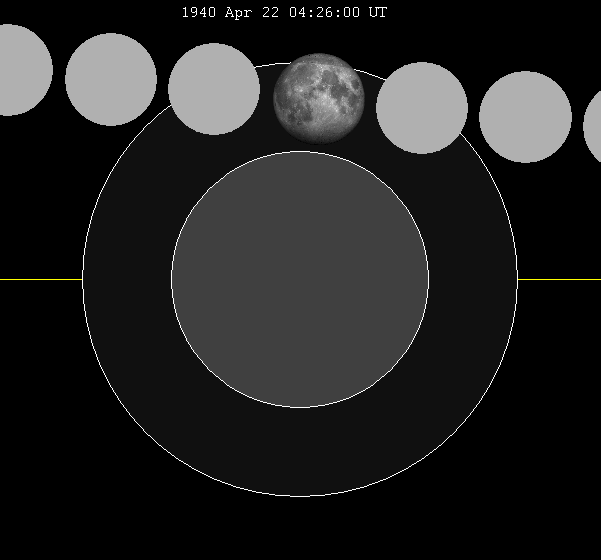
- The Moon's hourly motion shown right to left
- Date: April 22, 1940
- Gamma: 1.0741
- Magnitude: −0.0945
- Saros cycle: 140 (21 of 80)
- Penumbral: 232 minutes, 31 seconds
Contacts (UTC)
- P1: 2:29:43
- Greatest: 4:26:01
- P4: 6:22:14

A penumbral lunar eclipse occurred at the Moon’s ascending node of orbit on Monday, April 22, 1940, with an umbral magnitude of −0.0945. A lunar eclipse occurs when the Moon moves into the Earth's shadow, causing the Moon to be darkened. A penumbral lunar eclipse occurs when part or all of the Moon's near side passes into the Earth's penumbra. Unlike a solar eclipse, which can only be viewed from a relatively small area of the world, a lunar eclipse may be viewed from anywhere on the night side of Earth. Occurring about 2.7 days after perigee (on April 20, 1940, at 20:20 UTC), the Moon's apparent diameter was larger.

== Visibility ==
The eclipse was completely visible over much of North America, South America, west Africa, and Antarctica, seen rising over northwestern North America and the central Pacific Ocean and setting over Africa, Europe, and the Middle East.

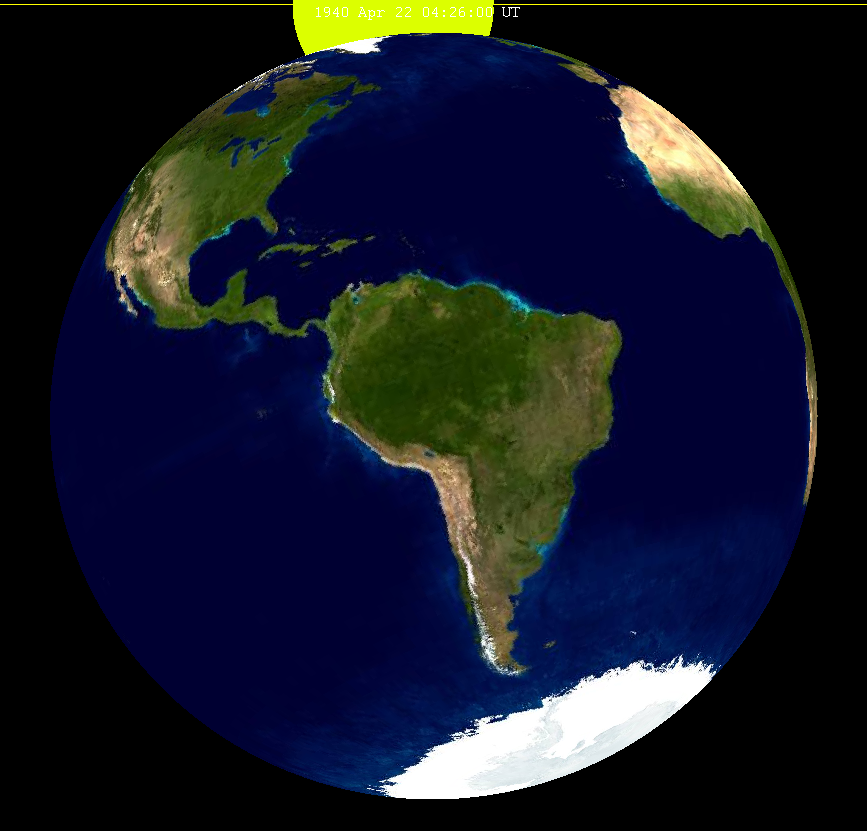
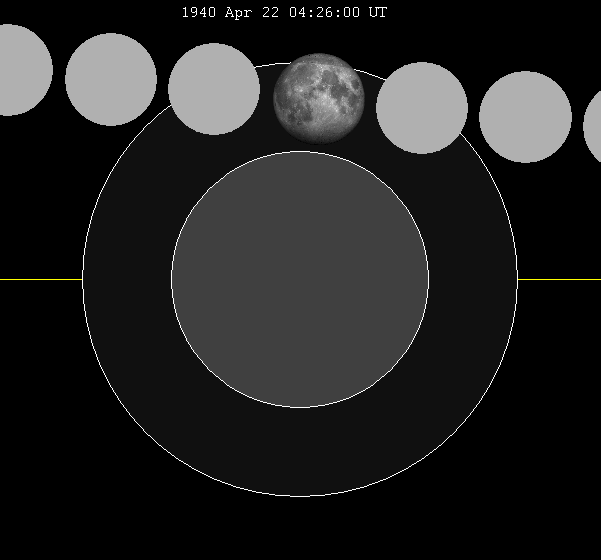

== Eclipse details ==
Shown below is a table displaying details about this particular solar eclipse. It describes various parameters pertaining to this eclipse.

April 22, 1940 Lunar Eclipse Parameters
Parameter	Value
Penumbral Magnitude	0.86836
Umbral Magnitude	−0.09446
Gamma	1.07414
Sun Right Ascension	01h58m53.2s
Sun Declination	+12°08'03.3"
Sun Semi-Diameter	15'54.5"
Sun Equatorial Horizontal Parallax	08.7"
Moon Right Ascension	14h00m00.5s
Moon Declination	-11°05'02.6"
Moon Semi-Diameter	16'31.3"
Moon Equatorial Horizontal Parallax	1°00'38.2"
ΔT	24.5 s

== Eclipse season ==
This eclipse is part of an eclipse season, a period, roughly every six months, when eclipses occur. Only two (or occasionally three) eclipse seasons occur each year, and each season lasts about 35 days and repeats just short of six months (173 days) later; thus two full eclipse seasons always occur each year. Either two or three eclipses happen each eclipse season. In the sequence below, each eclipse is separated by a fortnight. The first and last eclipse in this sequence is separated by one synodic month.

Eclipse season of March–April 1940
March 23 Ascending node (full moon)	April 7 Descending node (new moon)	April 22 Ascending node (full moon)
Penumbral lunar eclipse Lunar Saros 102	Annular solar eclipse Solar Saros 128	Penumbral lunar eclipse Lunar Saros 140

== Related eclipses ==
=== Eclipses in 1940 ===
- A penumbral lunar eclipse on March 23.
- An annular solar eclipse on April 7.
- A penumbral lunar eclipse on April 22.
- A total solar eclipse on October 1.
- A penumbral lunar eclipse on October 16.

=== Metonic ===
- Preceded by: Lunar eclipse of July 4, 1936
- Followed by: Lunar eclipse of February 9, 1944

=== Tzolkinex ===
- Preceded by: Lunar eclipse of March 12, 1933
- Followed by: Lunar eclipse of June 3, 1947

=== Half-Saros ===
- Preceded by: Solar eclipse of April 18, 1931
- Followed by: Solar eclipse of April 28, 1949

=== Tritos ===
- Preceded by: Lunar eclipse of May 23, 1929
- Followed by: Lunar eclipse of March 23, 1951

=== Lunar Saros 140 ===
- Preceded by: Lunar eclipse of April 11, 1922
- Followed by: Lunar eclipse of May 3, 1958

=== Inex ===
- Preceded by: Lunar eclipse of May 13, 1911
- Followed by: Lunar eclipse of April 2, 1969

=== Triad ===
- Preceded by: Lunar eclipse of June 21, 1853
- Followed by: Lunar eclipse of February 20, 2027

=== Lunar eclipses of 1937–1940 ===
This eclipse is a member of a semester series. An eclipse in a semester series of lunar eclipses repeats approximately every 177 days and 4 hours (a semester) at alternating nodes of the Moon's orbit.

The penumbral lunar eclipse on March 23, 1940 occurs in the next lunar year eclipse set.

Lunar eclipse series sets from 1937 to 1940
Ascending node				Descending node			
Saros	Date Viewing	Type Chart	Gamma	Saros	Date Viewing	Type Chart	Gamma
110	1937 May 25	Penumbral	−1.1582	115	1937 Nov 18	Partial	0.9421
120	1938 May 14	Total	−0.3994	125	1938 Nov 07	Total	0.2739
130	1939 May 03	Total	0.3693	135	1939 Oct 28	Partial	−0.4581
140	1940 Apr 22	Penumbral	1.0741	145	1940 Oct 16	Penumbral	−1.1925

=== Saros 140 ===
This eclipse is a part of Saros series 140, repeating every 18 years, 11 days, and containing 77 events. The series started with a penumbral lunar eclipse on September 25, 1597. It contains partial eclipses from May 3, 1958 through July 17, 2084; total eclipses from July 30, 2102 through May 21, 2589; and a second set of partial eclipses from June 2, 2607 through August 7, 2715. The series ends at member 77 as a penumbral eclipse on January 6, 2968.

The longest duration of totality will be produced by member 38 at 98 minutes, 36 seconds on November 4, 2264. All eclipses in this series occur at the Moon’s ascending node of orbit.

Greatest	First			
The greatest eclipse of the series will occur on 2264 Nov 04, lasting 98 minutes, 36 seconds.	Penumbral	Partial	Total	Central
The greatest eclipse of the series will occur on 2264 Nov 04, lasting 98 minutes, 36 seconds.	1597 Sep 25	1958 May 03	2102 Jul 30	2156 Aug 30
The greatest eclipse of the series will occur on 2264 Nov 04, lasting 98 minutes, 36 seconds.	Last			
The greatest eclipse of the series will occur on 2264 Nov 04, lasting 98 minutes, 36 seconds.	Central	Total	Partial	Penumbral
The greatest eclipse of the series will occur on 2264 Nov 04, lasting 98 minutes, 36 seconds.	2535 Apr 19	2589 May 21	2715 Aug 07	2968 Jan 06

Eclipses are tabulated in three columns; every third eclipse in the same column is one exeligmos apart, so they all cast shadows over approximately the same parts of the Earth.

Series members 13–34 occur between 1801 and 2200:
13	14	15
1814 Feb 04	1832 Feb 16	1850 Feb 26
16	17	18
1868 Mar 08	1886 Mar 20	1904 Mar 31
19	20	21
1922 Apr 11	1940 Apr 22	1958 May 03
22	23	24
1976 May 13	1994 May 25	2012 Jun 04
25	26	27
2030 Jun 15	2048 Jun 26	2066 Jul 07
28	29	30
2084 Jul 17	2102 Jul 30	2120 Aug 09
31	32	33
2138 Aug 20	2156 Aug 30	2174 Sep 11
34
2192 Sep 21

=== Tritos series ===
This eclipse is a part of a tritos cycle, repeating at alternating nodes every 135 synodic months (≈ 3986.63 days, or 11 years minus 1 month). Their appearance and longitude are irregular due to a lack of synchronization with the anomalistic month (period of perigee), but groupings of 3 tritos cycles (≈ 33 years minus 3 months) come close (≈ 434.044 anomalistic months), so eclipses are similar in these groupings.

Series members between 1801 and 2147
1809 Apr 30 (Saros 128)	1820 Mar 29 (Saros 129)	1831 Feb 26 (Saros 130)	1842 Jan 26 (Saros 131)	1852 Dec 26 (Saros 132)
1863 Nov 25 (Saros 133)	1874 Oct 25 (Saros 134)	1885 Sep 24 (Saros 135)	1896 Aug 23 (Saros 136)	1907 Jul 25 (Saros 137)
1918 Jun 24 (Saros 138)	1929 May 23 (Saros 139)	1940 Apr 22 (Saros 140)	1951 Mar 23 (Saros 141)	1962 Feb 19 (Saros 142)
1973 Jan 18 (Saros 143)	1983 Dec 20 (Saros 144)	1994 Nov 18 (Saros 145)	2005 Oct 17 (Saros 146)	2016 Sep 16 (Saros 147)
2027 Aug 17 (Saros 148)	2038 Jul 16 (Saros 149)	2049 Jun 15 (Saros 150)		
			2114 Dec 12 (Saros 156)	
	2147 Sep 09 (Saros 159)			

=== Inex series ===
This eclipse is a part of the long period inex cycle, repeating at alternating nodes, every 358 synodic months (≈ 10,571.95 days, or 29 years minus 20 days). Their appearance and longitude are irregular due to a lack of synchronization with the anomalistic month (period of perigee). However, groupings of 3 inex cycles (≈ 87 years minus 2 months) comes close (≈ 1,151.02 anomalistic months), so eclipses are similar in these groupings.

Series members between 1801 and 2200
1824 Jul 11 (Saros 136)	1853 Jun 21 (Saros 137)	1882 Jun 01 (Saros 138)
1911 May 13 (Saros 139)	1940 Apr 22 (Saros 140)	1969 Apr 02 (Saros 141)
1998 Mar 13 (Saros 142)	2027 Feb 20 (Saros 143)	2056 Feb 01 (Saros 144)
2085 Jan 10 (Saros 145)	2113 Dec 22 (Saros 146)	2142 Dec 03 (Saros 147)
2171 Nov 12 (Saros 148)	2200 Oct 23 (Saros 149)	

=== Half-Saros cycle ===
A lunar eclipse will be preceded and followed by solar eclipses by 9 years and 5.5 days (a half saros). This lunar eclipse is related to two partial solar eclipses of Solar Saros 147.

April 18, 1931	April 28, 1949

== See also ==
- List of lunar eclipses
- List of 20th-century lunar eclipses
