= June 2030 lunar eclipse =

Astronomical event

- Partial eclipse
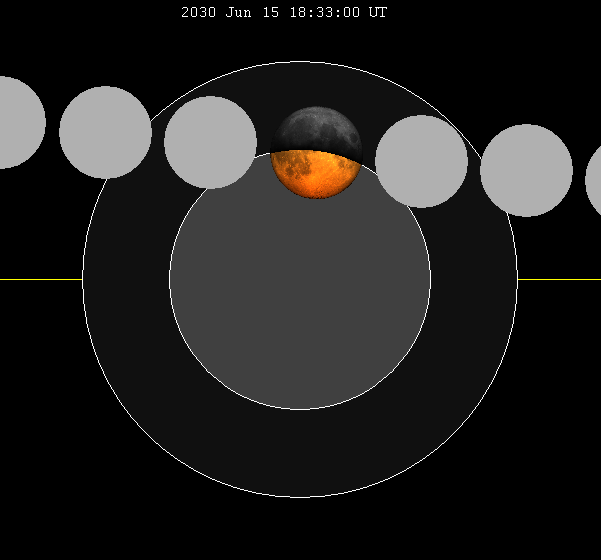
- The Moon's hourly motion shown right to left
- Date: June 15, 2030
- Gamma: 0.7534
- Magnitude: 0.5025
- Saros cycle: 140 (26 of 80)
- Partiality: 144 minutes, 22 seconds
- Penumbral: 278 minutes, 14 seconds
Contacts (UTC)
- P1: 16:15:28
- U1: 17:22:22
- Greatest: 18:34:34
- U4: 19:46:46
- P4: 20:53:40

A partial lunar eclipse will occur at the Moon’s ascending node of orbit on Saturday, June 15, 2030, with an umbral magnitude of 0.5025. A lunar eclipse occurs when the Moon moves into the Earth's shadow, causing the Moon to be darkened. A partial lunar eclipse occurs when one part of the Moon is in the Earth's umbra, while the other part is in the Earth's penumbra. Unlike a solar eclipse, which can only be viewed from a relatively small area of the world, a lunar eclipse may be viewed from anywhere on the night side of Earth. Occurring only about 23 hours before perigee (on June 14, 2030, at 19:30 UTC), the Moon's apparent diameter will be larger.

== Visibility ==
The eclipse will be completely visible over east Africa, Asia, Antarctica, and Australia, seen rising over west Africa and Europe and setting over the central Pacific Ocean.

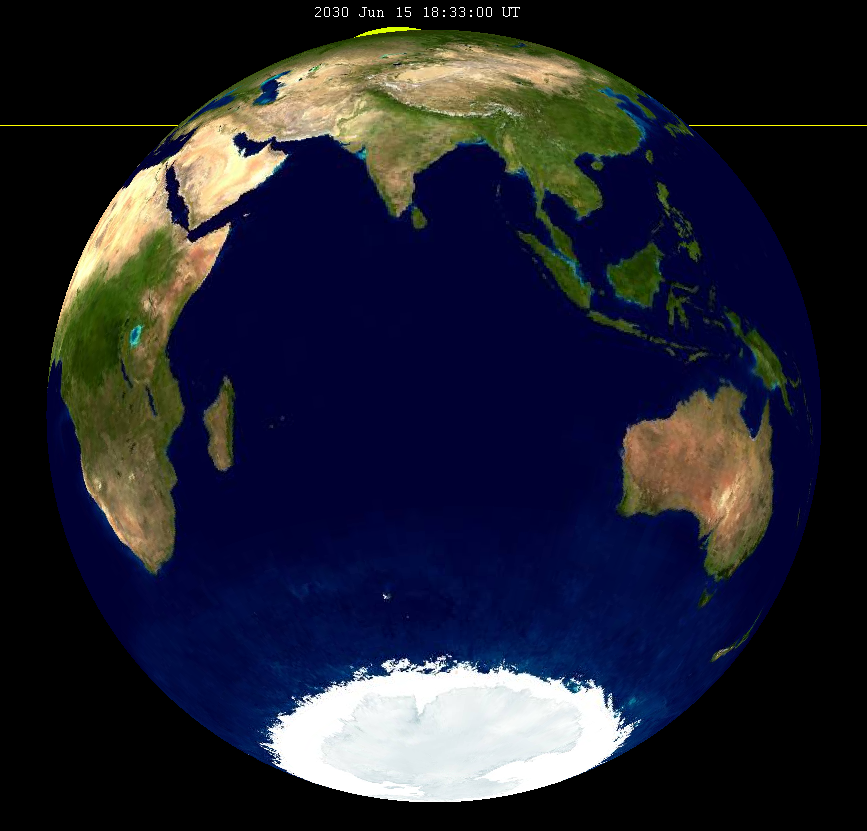
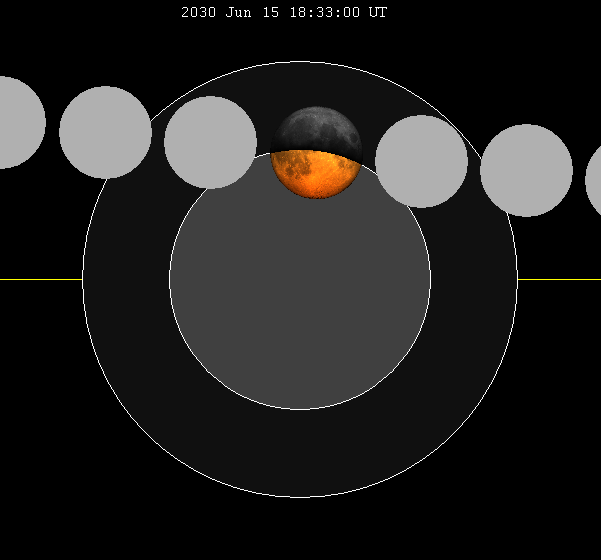

== Eclipse details ==
Shown below is a table displaying details about this particular lunar eclipse. It describes various parameters pertaining to this eclipse.

June 15, 2030 Lunar Eclipse Parameters
Parameter	Value
Penumbral Magnitude	1.44952
Umbral Magnitude	0.50401
Gamma	0.75346
Sun Right Ascension	05h36m57.6s
Sun Declination	+23°19'44.0"
Sun Semi-Diameter	15'44.7"
Sun Equatorial Horizontal Parallax	08.7"
Moon Right Ascension	17h36m46.1s
Moon Declination	-22°33'45.8"
Moon Semi-Diameter	16'39.2"
Moon Equatorial Horizontal Parallax	1°01'07.1"
ΔT	74.1 s

== Eclipse season ==
This eclipse is part of an eclipse season, a period, roughly every six months, when eclipses occur. Only two (or occasionally three) eclipse seasons occur each year, and each season lasts about 35 days and repeats just short of six months (173 days) later; thus two full eclipse seasons always occur each year. Either two or three eclipses happen each eclipse season. In the sequence below, each eclipse is separated by a fortnight.

Eclipse season of June 2030
June 1 Descending node (new moon)	June 15 Ascending node (full moon)
Annular solar eclipse Solar Saros 128	Partial lunar eclipse Lunar Saros 140

== Related eclipses ==
=== Eclipses in 2030 ===
- An annular solar eclipse on June 1.
- A partial lunar eclipse on June 15.
- A total solar eclipse on November 25.
- A penumbral lunar eclipse on December 9.

=== Metonic ===
- Preceded by: Lunar eclipse of August 28, 2026
- Followed by: Lunar eclipse of April 3, 2034

=== Tzolkinex ===
- Preceded by: Lunar eclipse of May 5, 2023
- Followed by: Lunar eclipse of July 27, 2037

=== Half-Saros ===
- Preceded by: Solar eclipse of June 10, 2021
- Followed by: Solar eclipse of June 21, 2039

=== Tritos ===
- Preceded by: Lunar eclipse of July 16, 2019
- Followed by: Lunar eclipse of May 16, 2041

=== Lunar Saros 140 ===
- Preceded by: Lunar eclipse of June 4, 2012
- Followed by: Lunar eclipse of June 26, 2048

=== Inex ===
- Preceded by: Lunar eclipse of July 5, 2001
- Followed by: Lunar eclipse of May 27, 2059

=== Triad ===
- Preceded by: Lunar eclipse of August 15, 1943
- Followed by: Lunar eclipse of April 16, 2117

=== Lunar eclipses of 2027–2031 ===
This eclipse is a member of a semester series. An eclipse in a semester series of lunar eclipses repeats approximately every 177 days and 4 hours (a semester) at alternating nodes of the Moon's orbit.

The penumbral lunar eclipses on February 20, 2027 and August 17, 2027 occur in the previous lunar year eclipse set, and the penumbral lunar eclipses on May 7, 2031 and October 30, 2031 occur in the next lunar year eclipse set.

Lunar eclipse series sets from 2027 to 2031
Ascending node				Descending node			
Saros	Date Viewing	Type Chart	Gamma	Saros	Date Viewing	Type Chart	Gamma
110	2027 Jul 18	Penumbral	−1.5759	115	2028 Jan 12	Partial	0.9818
120	2028 Jul 06	Partial	−0.7904	125	2028 Dec 31	Total	0.3258
130	2029 Jun 26	Total	0.0124	135	2029 Dec 20	Total	−0.3811
140	2030 Jun 15	Partial	0.7535	145	2030 Dec 09	Penumbral	−1.0732
150	2031 Jun 05	Penumbral	1.4732				

=== Saros 140 ===
This eclipse is a part of Saros series 140, repeating every 18 years, 11 days, and containing 77 events. The series started with a penumbral lunar eclipse on September 25, 1597. It contains partial eclipses from May 3, 1958 through July 17, 2084; total eclipses from July 30, 2102 through May 21, 2589; and a second set of partial eclipses from June 2, 2607 through August 7, 2715. The series ends at member 77 as a penumbral eclipse on January 6, 2968.

The longest duration of totality will be produced by member 38 at 98 minutes, 36 seconds on November 4, 2264. All eclipses in this series occur at the Moon’s ascending node of orbit.

Greatest	First			
The greatest eclipse of the series will occur on 2264 Nov 04, lasting 98 minutes, 36 seconds.	Penumbral	Partial	Total	Central
The greatest eclipse of the series will occur on 2264 Nov 04, lasting 98 minutes, 36 seconds.	1597 Sep 25	1958 May 03	2102 Jul 30	2156 Aug 30
The greatest eclipse of the series will occur on 2264 Nov 04, lasting 98 minutes, 36 seconds.	Last			
The greatest eclipse of the series will occur on 2264 Nov 04, lasting 98 minutes, 36 seconds.	Central	Total	Partial	Penumbral
The greatest eclipse of the series will occur on 2264 Nov 04, lasting 98 minutes, 36 seconds.	2535 Apr 19	2589 May 21	2715 Aug 07	2968 Jan 06

Eclipses are tabulated in three columns; every third eclipse in the same column is one exeligmos apart, so they all cast shadows over approximately the same parts of the Earth.

Series members 13–34 occur between 1801 and 2200:
13	14	15
1814 Feb 04	1832 Feb 16	1850 Feb 26
16	17	18
1868 Mar 08	1886 Mar 20	1904 Mar 31
19	20	21
1922 Apr 11	1940 Apr 22	1958 May 03
22	23	24
1976 May 13	1994 May 25	2012 Jun 04
25	26	27
2030 Jun 15	2048 Jun 26	2066 Jul 07
28	29	30
2084 Jul 17	2102 Jul 30	2120 Aug 09
31	32	33
2138 Aug 20	2156 Aug 30	2174 Sep 11
34
2192 Sep 21

=== Tritos series ===
This eclipse is a part of a tritos cycle, repeating at alternating nodes every 135 synodic months (≈ 3986.63 days, or 11 years minus 1 month). Their appearance and longitude are irregular due to a lack of synchronization with the anomalistic month (period of perigee), but groupings of 3 tritos cycles (≈ 33 years minus 3 months) come close (≈ 434.044 anomalistic months), so eclipses are similar in these groupings.

Series members between 1801 and 2200
1801 Mar 30 (Saros 119)	1812 Feb 27 (Saros 120)	1823 Jan 26 (Saros 121)	1833 Dec 26 (Saros 122)	1844 Nov 24 (Saros 123)
1855 Oct 25 (Saros 124)	1866 Sep 24 (Saros 125)	1877 Aug 23 (Saros 126)	1888 Jul 23 (Saros 127)	1899 Jun 23 (Saros 128)
1910 May 24 (Saros 129)	1921 Apr 22 (Saros 130)	1932 Mar 22 (Saros 131)	1943 Feb 20 (Saros 132)	1954 Jan 19 (Saros 133)
1964 Dec 19 (Saros 134)	1975 Nov 18 (Saros 135)	1986 Oct 17 (Saros 136)	1997 Sep 16 (Saros 137)	2008 Aug 16 (Saros 138)
2019 Jul 16 (Saros 139)	2030 Jun 15 (Saros 140)	2041 May 16 (Saros 141)	2052 Apr 14 (Saros 142)	2063 Mar 14 (Saros 143)
2074 Feb 11 (Saros 144)	2085 Jan 10 (Saros 145)	2095 Dec 11 (Saros 146)	2106 Nov 11 (Saros 147)	2117 Oct 10 (Saros 148)
2128 Sep 09 (Saros 149)	2139 Aug 10 (Saros 150)	2150 Jul 09 (Saros 151)	2161 Jun 08 (Saros 152)	2172 May 08 (Saros 153)
	2194 Mar 07 (Saros 155)			

=== Inex series ===
This eclipse is a part of the long period inex cycle, repeating at alternating nodes, every 358 synodic months (≈ 10,571.95 days, or 29 years minus 20 days). Their appearance and longitude are irregular due to a lack of synchronization with the anomalistic month (period of perigee). However, groupings of 3 inex cycles (≈ 87 years minus 2 months) comes close (≈ 1,151.02 anomalistic months), so eclipses are similar in these groupings.

Series members between 1801 and 2200
1827 Nov 03 (Saros 133)	1856 Oct 13 (Saros 134)	1885 Sep 24 (Saros 135)
1914 Sep 04 (Saros 136)	1943 Aug 15 (Saros 137)	1972 Jul 26 (Saros 138)
2001 Jul 05 (Saros 139)	2030 Jun 15 (Saros 140)	2059 May 27 (Saros 141)
2088 May 05 (Saros 142)	2117 Apr 16 (Saros 143)	2146 Mar 28 (Saros 144)
2175 Mar 07 (Saros 145)

=== Half-Saros cycle ===
A lunar eclipse will be preceded and followed by solar eclipses by 9 years and 5.5 days (a half saros). This lunar eclipse is related to two annular solar eclipses of Solar Saros 147.

June 10, 2021	June 21, 2039

== See also ==
- List of lunar eclipses and List of 21st-century lunar eclipses
