= May 1976 lunar eclipse =

Partial lunar eclipse May 13, 1976

- Partial eclipse
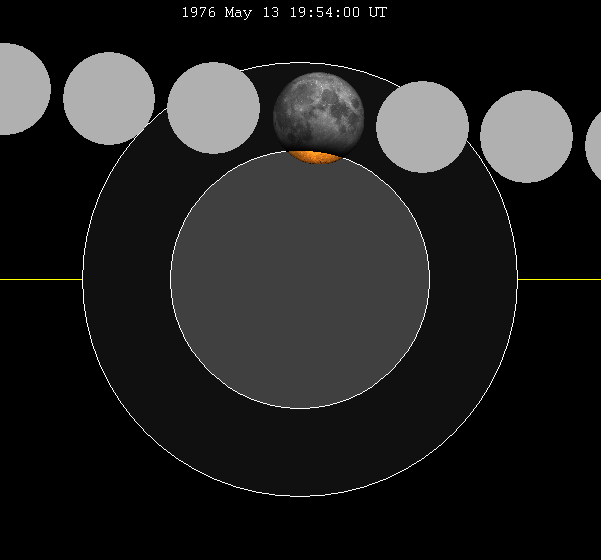
- The Moon's hourly motion shown right to left
- Date: May 13, 1976
- Gamma: 0.9586
- Magnitude: 0.1217
- Saros cycle: 140 (23 of 80)
- Partiality: 75 minutes, 23 seconds
- Penumbral: 251 minutes, 49 seconds
Contacts (UTC)
- P1: 17:48:25
- U1: 19:16:36
- Greatest: 19:54:21
- U4: 20:31:59
- P4: 22:00:14

A partial lunar eclipse occurred at the Moon’s ascending node of orbit on Thursday, May 13, 1976, with an umbral magnitude of 0.1217. A lunar eclipse occurs when the Moon moves into the Earth's shadow, causing the Moon to be darkened. A partial lunar eclipse occurs when one part of the Moon is in the Earth's umbra, while the other part is in the Earth's penumbra. Unlike a solar eclipse, which can only be viewed from a relatively small area of the world, a lunar eclipse may be viewed from anywhere on the night side of Earth. Occurring about 1.1 days after perigee (on May 12, 1976, at 17:30 UTC), the Moon's apparent diameter was larger.

== Visibility ==
The eclipse was completely visible over central and east Africa, eastern Europe, the western half of Asia, western Australia, and Antarctica, seen rising over eastern South America, west Africa, and western Europe and setting over east and northeast Asia and eastern Australia.

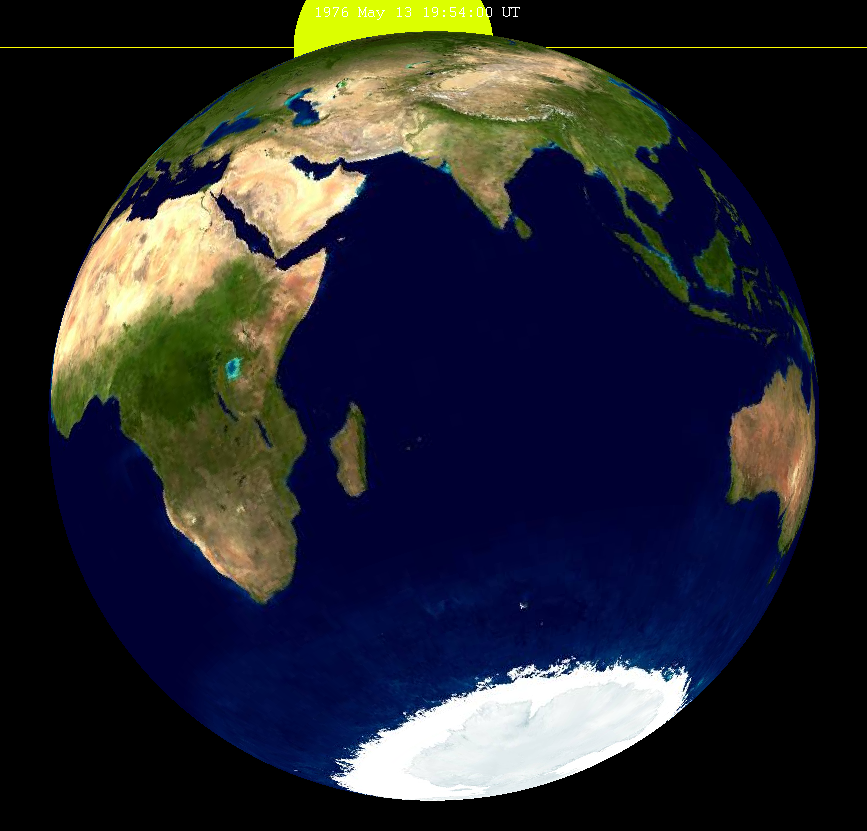
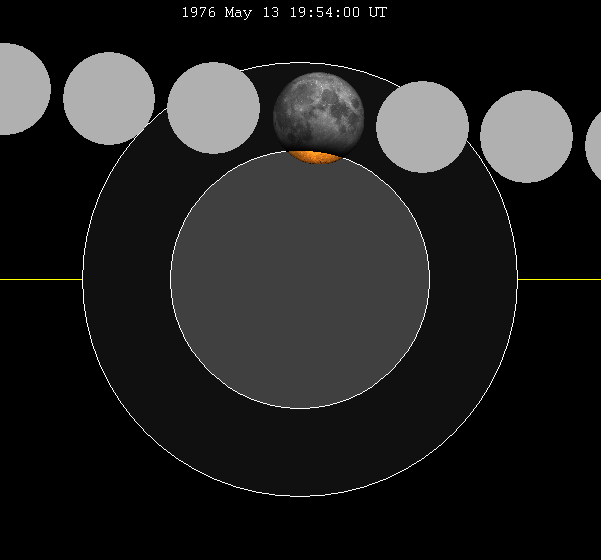

== Eclipse details ==
Shown below is a table displaying details about this particular lunar eclipse. It describes various parameters pertaining to this eclipse.

May 13, 1976 Lunar Eclipse Parameters
Parameter	Value
Penumbral Magnitude	1.07612
Umbral Magnitude	0.12170
Gamma	0.95860
Sun Right Ascension	03h23m03.9s
Sun Declination	+18°33'49.8"
Sun Semi-Diameter	15'49.5"
Sun Equatorial Horizontal Parallax	08.7"
Moon Right Ascension	15h23m42.3s
Moon Declination	-17°36'13.1"
Moon Semi-Diameter	16'34.8"
Moon Equatorial Horizontal Parallax	1°00'51.1"
ΔT	46.9 s

== Eclipse season ==
This eclipse is part of an eclipse season, a period, roughly every six months, when eclipses occur. Only two (or occasionally three) eclipse seasons occur each year, and each season lasts about 35 days and repeats just short of six months (173 days) later; thus two full eclipse seasons always occur each year. Either two or three eclipses happen each eclipse season. In the sequence below, each eclipse is separated by a fortnight.

Eclipse season of April–May 1976
April 29 Descending node (new moon)	May 13 Ascending node (full moon)
Annular solar eclipse Solar Saros 128	Partial lunar eclipse Lunar Saros 140

== Related eclipses ==
=== Eclipses in 1976 ===
- An annular solar eclipse on April 29.
- A partial lunar eclipse on May 13.
- A total solar eclipse on October 23.
- A penumbral lunar eclipse on November 6.

=== Metonic ===
- Preceded by: Lunar eclipse of July 26, 1972
- Followed by: Lunar eclipse of March 1, 1980

=== Tzolkinex ===
- Preceded by: Lunar eclipse of April 2, 1969
- Followed by: Lunar eclipse of June 25, 1983

=== Half-Saros ===
- Preceded by: Solar eclipse of May 9, 1967
- Followed by: Solar eclipse of May 19, 1985

=== Tritos ===
- Preceded by: Lunar eclipse of June 14, 1965
- Followed by: Lunar eclipse of April 14, 1987

=== Lunar Saros 140 ===
- Preceded by: Lunar eclipse of May 3, 1958
- Followed by: Lunar eclipse of May 25, 1994

=== Inex ===
- Preceded by: Lunar eclipse of June 3, 1947
- Followed by: Lunar eclipse of April 24, 2005

=== Triad ===
- Preceded by: Lunar eclipse of July 12, 1889
- Followed by: Lunar eclipse of March 14, 2063

=== Lunar eclipses of 1973–1976 ===
This eclipse is a member of a semester series. An eclipse in a semester series of lunar eclipses repeats approximately every 177 days and 4 hours (a semester) at alternating nodes of the Moon's orbit.

The penumbral lunar eclipses on January 18, 1973 and July 15, 1973 occur in the previous lunar year eclipse set.

Lunar eclipse series sets from 1973 to 1976
Ascending node				Descending node			
Saros	Date Viewing	Type Chart	Gamma	Saros	Date Viewing	Type Chart	Gamma
110	1973 Jun 15	Penumbral	−1.3217	115	1973 Dec 10	Partial	0.9644
120	1974 Jun 04	Partial	−0.5489	125	1974 Nov 29	Total	0.3054
130	1975 May 25	Total	0.2367	135	1975 Nov 18	Total	−0.4134
140	1976 May 13	Partial	0.9586	145	1976 Nov 06	Penumbral	−1.1276

=== Saros 140 ===
This eclipse is a part of Saros series 140, repeating every 18 years, 11 days, and containing 77 events. The series started with a penumbral lunar eclipse on September 25, 1597. It contains partial eclipses from May 3, 1958 through July 17, 2084; total eclipses from July 30, 2102 through May 21, 2589; and a second set of partial eclipses from June 2, 2607 through August 7, 2715. The series ends at member 77 as a penumbral eclipse on January 6, 2968.

The longest duration of totality will be produced by member 38 at 98 minutes, 36 seconds on November 4, 2264. All eclipses in this series occur at the Moon’s ascending node of orbit.

Greatest	First			
The greatest eclipse of the series will occur on 2264 Nov 04, lasting 98 minutes, 36 seconds.	Penumbral	Partial	Total	Central
The greatest eclipse of the series will occur on 2264 Nov 04, lasting 98 minutes, 36 seconds.	1597 Sep 25	1958 May 03	2102 Jul 30	2156 Aug 30
The greatest eclipse of the series will occur on 2264 Nov 04, lasting 98 minutes, 36 seconds.	Last			
The greatest eclipse of the series will occur on 2264 Nov 04, lasting 98 minutes, 36 seconds.	Central	Total	Partial	Penumbral
The greatest eclipse of the series will occur on 2264 Nov 04, lasting 98 minutes, 36 seconds.	2535 Apr 19	2589 May 21	2715 Aug 07	2968 Jan 06

Eclipses are tabulated in three columns; every third eclipse in the same column is one exeligmos apart, so they all cast shadows over approximately the same parts of the Earth.

Series members 13–34 occur between 1801 and 2200:
13	14	15
1814 Feb 04	1832 Feb 16	1850 Feb 26
16	17	18
1868 Mar 08	1886 Mar 20	1904 Mar 31
19	20	21
1922 Apr 11	1940 Apr 22	1958 May 03
22	23	24
1976 May 13	1994 May 25	2012 Jun 04
25	26	27
2030 Jun 15	2048 Jun 26	2066 Jul 07
28	29	30
2084 Jul 17	2102 Jul 30	2120 Aug 09
31	32	33
2138 Aug 20	2156 Aug 30	2174 Sep 11
34
2192 Sep 21

=== Tritos series ===
This eclipse is a part of a tritos cycle, repeating at alternating nodes every 135 synodic months (≈ 3986.63 days, or 11 years minus 1 month). Their appearance and longitude are irregular due to a lack of synchronization with the anomalistic month (period of perigee), but groupings of 3 tritos cycles (≈ 33 years minus 3 months) come close (≈ 434.044 anomalistic months), so eclipses are similar in these groupings.

Series members between 1801 and 2183
1801 Sep 22 (Saros 124)	1812 Aug 22 (Saros 125)	1823 Jul 23 (Saros 126)	1834 Jun 21 (Saros 127)	1845 May 21 (Saros 128)
1856 Apr 20 (Saros 129)	1867 Mar 20 (Saros 130)	1878 Feb 17 (Saros 131)	1889 Jan 17 (Saros 132)	1899 Dec 17 (Saros 133)
1910 Nov 17 (Saros 134)	1921 Oct 16 (Saros 135)	1932 Sep 14 (Saros 136)	1943 Aug 15 (Saros 137)	1954 Jul 16 (Saros 138)
1965 Jun 14 (Saros 139)	1976 May 13 (Saros 140)	1987 Apr 14 (Saros 141)	1998 Mar 13 (Saros 142)	2009 Feb 09 (Saros 143)
2020 Jan 10 (Saros 144)	2030 Dec 09 (Saros 145)	2041 Nov 08 (Saros 146)	2052 Oct 08 (Saros 147)	2063 Sep 07 (Saros 148)
2074 Aug 07 (Saros 149)	2085 Jul 07 (Saros 150)	2096 Jun 06 (Saros 151)	2107 May 07 (Saros 152)	
		2151 Jan 02 (Saros 156)		2172 Oct 31 (Saros 158)
2183 Oct 01 (Saros 159)

=== Inex series ===
This eclipse is a part of the long period inex cycle, repeating at alternating nodes, every 358 synodic months (≈ 10,571.95 days, or 29 years minus 20 days). Their appearance and longitude are irregular due to a lack of synchronization with the anomalistic month (period of perigee). However, groupings of 3 inex cycles (≈ 87 years minus 2 months) comes close (≈ 1,151.02 anomalistic months), so eclipses are similar in these groupings.

Series members between 1801 and 2200
1802 Sep 11 (Saros 134)	1831 Aug 23 (Saros 135)	1860 Aug 01 (Saros 136)
1889 Jul 12 (Saros 137)	1918 Jun 24 (Saros 138)	1947 Jun 03 (Saros 139)
1976 May 13 (Saros 140)	2005 Apr 24 (Saros 141)	2034 Apr 03 (Saros 142)
2063 Mar 14 (Saros 143)	2092 Feb 23 (Saros 144)	2121 Feb 02 (Saros 145)
2150 Jan 13 (Saros 146)	2178 Dec 24 (Saros 147)	

=== Half-Saros cycle ===
A lunar eclipse will be preceded and followed by solar eclipses by 9 years and 5.5 days (a half saros). This lunar eclipse is related to two partial solar eclipses of Solar Saros 147.

May 9, 1967	May 19, 1985

== See also ==
- List of lunar eclipses
- List of 20th-century lunar eclipses
