= May 1994 lunar eclipse =

Partial lunar eclipse May 25, 1994

- Partial eclipse
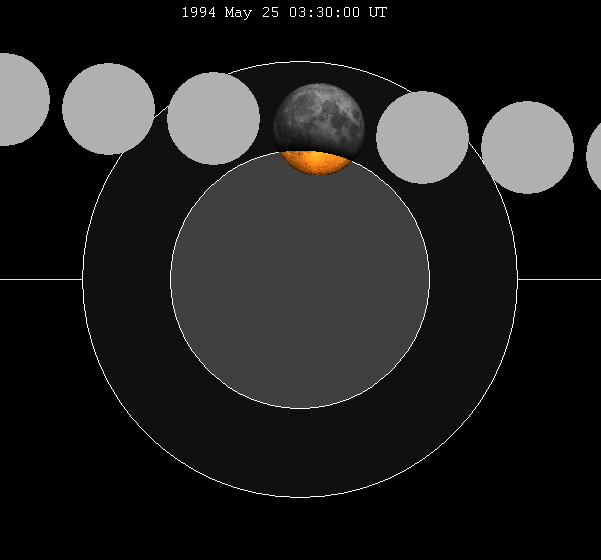
- The Moon's hourly motion shown right to left
- Date: May 25, 1994
- Gamma: 0.8933
- Magnitude: 0.2432
- Saros cycle: 140 (24 of 80)
- Partiality: 104 minutes, 36 seconds
- Penumbral: 261 minutes, 12 seconds
Contacts (UTC)
- P1: 1:19:43
- U1: 2:37:59
- Greatest: 3:30:20
- U4: 4:22:36
- P4: 5:40:55

A partial lunar eclipse occurred at the Moon’s ascending node of orbit on Wednesday, May 25, 1994, with an umbral magnitude of 0.2432. A lunar eclipse occurs when the Moon moves into the Earth's shadow, causing the Moon to be darkened. A partial lunar eclipse occurs when one part of the Moon is in the Earth's umbra, while the other part is in the Earth's penumbra. Unlike a solar eclipse, which can only be viewed from a relatively small area of the world, a lunar eclipse may be viewed from anywhere on the night side of Earth. Occurring only about 23.5 hours after perigee (on May 24, 1994, at 3:55 UTC), the Moon's apparent diameter was larger.

== Visibility ==
The eclipse was completely visible over eastern North America, South America, west Africa, and Antarctica, seen rising over western North America and the eastern Pacific Ocean and setting over much of Africa, Europe, and the Middle East.

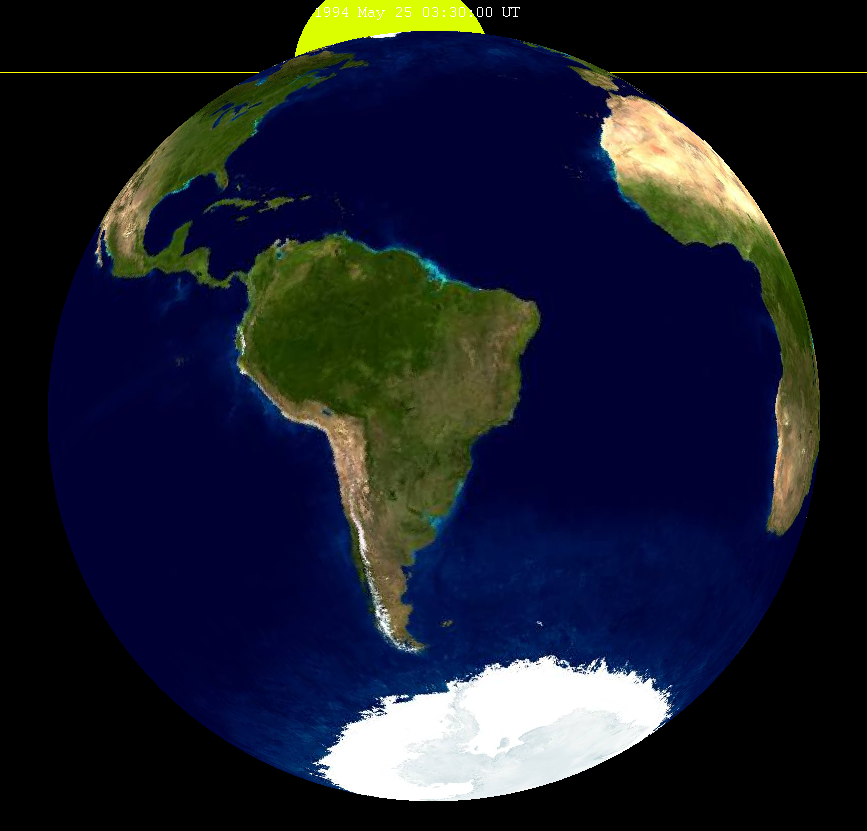
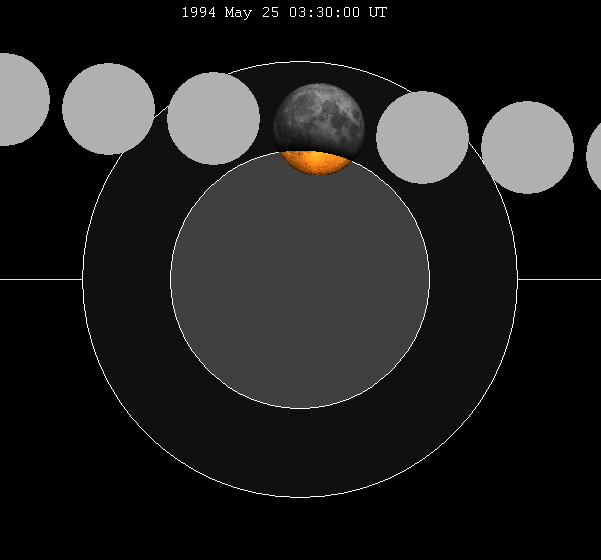

== Eclipse details ==
Shown below is a table displaying details about this particular lunar eclipse. It describes various parameters pertaining to this eclipse.

May 25, 1994 Lunar Eclipse Parameters
Parameter	Value
Penumbral Magnitude	1.19408
Umbral Magnitude	0.24318
Gamma	0.89334
Sun Right Ascension	04h06m48.5s
Sun Declination	+20°53'35.0"
Sun Semi-Diameter	15'47.5"
Sun Equatorial Horizontal Parallax	08.7"
Moon Right Ascension	16h07m09.9s
Moon Declination	-19°59'22.3"
Moon Semi-Diameter	16'36.4"
Moon Equatorial Horizontal Parallax	1°00'56.9"
ΔT	60.3 s

== Eclipse season ==
This eclipse is part of an eclipse season, a period, roughly every six months, when eclipses occur. Only two (or occasionally three) eclipse seasons occur each year, and each season lasts about 35 days and repeats just short of six months (173 days) later; thus two full eclipse seasons always occur each year. Either two or three eclipses happen each eclipse season. In the sequence below, each eclipse is separated by a fortnight.

Eclipse season of May 1994
May 10 Descending node (new moon)	May 25 Ascending node (full moon)
Annular solar eclipse Solar Saros 128	Partial lunar eclipse Lunar Saros 140

== Related eclipses ==
=== Eclipses in 1994 ===
- An annular solar eclipse on May 10.
- A partial lunar eclipse on May 25.
- A total solar eclipse on November 3.
- A penumbral lunar eclipse on November 18.

=== Metonic ===
- Preceded by: Lunar eclipse of August 6, 1990
- Followed by: Lunar eclipse of March 13, 1998

=== Tzolkinex ===
- Preceded by: Lunar eclipse of April 14, 1987
- Followed by: Lunar eclipse of July 5, 2001

=== Half-Saros ===
- Preceded by: Solar eclipse of May 19, 1985
- Followed by: Solar eclipse of May 31, 2003

=== Tritos ===
- Preceded by: Lunar eclipse of June 25, 1983
- Followed by: Lunar eclipse of April 24, 2005

=== Lunar Saros 140 ===
- Preceded by: Lunar eclipse of May 13, 1976
- Followed by: Lunar eclipse of June 4, 2012

=== Inex ===
- Preceded by: Lunar eclipse of June 14, 1965
- Followed by: Lunar eclipse of May 5, 2023

=== Triad ===
- Preceded by: Lunar eclipse of July 25, 1907
- Followed by: Lunar eclipse of March 25, 2081

=== Lunar eclipses of 1991–1994 ===
This eclipse is a member of a semester series. An eclipse in a semester series of lunar eclipses repeats approximately every 177 days and 4 hours (a semester) at alternating nodes of the Moon's orbit.

The penumbral lunar eclipses on January 30, 1991 and July 26, 1991 occur in the previous lunar year eclipse set.

Lunar eclipse series sets from 1991 to 1994
Ascending node				Descending node			
Saros	Date Viewing	Type Chart	Gamma	Saros	Date Viewing	Type Chart	Gamma
110	1991 Jun 27	Penumbral	−1.4064	115	1991 Dec 21	Partial	0.9709
120	1992 Jun 15	Partial	−0.6289	125	1992 Dec 09	Total	0.3144
130	1993 Jun 04	Total	0.1638	135	1993 Nov 29	Total	−0.3994
140	1994 May 25	Partial	0.8933	145	1994 Nov 18	Penumbral	−1.1048

=== Saros 140 ===
This eclipse is a part of Saros series 140, repeating every 18 years, 11 days, and containing 77 events. The series started with a penumbral lunar eclipse on September 25, 1597. It contains partial eclipses from May 3, 1958 through July 17, 2084; total eclipses from July 30, 2102 through May 21, 2589; and a second set of partial eclipses from June 2, 2607 through August 7, 2715. The series ends at member 77 as a penumbral eclipse on January 6, 2968.

The longest duration of totality will be produced by member 38 at 98 minutes, 36 seconds on November 4, 2264. All eclipses in this series occur at the Moon’s ascending node of orbit.

Greatest	First			
The greatest eclipse of the series will occur on 2264 Nov 04, lasting 98 minutes, 36 seconds.	Penumbral	Partial	Total	Central
The greatest eclipse of the series will occur on 2264 Nov 04, lasting 98 minutes, 36 seconds.	1597 Sep 25	1958 May 03	2102 Jul 30	2156 Aug 30
The greatest eclipse of the series will occur on 2264 Nov 04, lasting 98 minutes, 36 seconds.	Last			
The greatest eclipse of the series will occur on 2264 Nov 04, lasting 98 minutes, 36 seconds.	Central	Total	Partial	Penumbral
The greatest eclipse of the series will occur on 2264 Nov 04, lasting 98 minutes, 36 seconds.	2535 Apr 19	2589 May 21	2715 Aug 07	2968 Jan 06

Eclipses are tabulated in three columns; every third eclipse in the same column is one exeligmos apart, so they all cast shadows over approximately the same parts of the Earth.

Series members 13–34 occur between 1801 and 2200:
13	14	15
1814 Feb 04	1832 Feb 16	1850 Feb 26
16	17	18
1868 Mar 08	1886 Mar 20	1904 Mar 31
19	20	21
1922 Apr 11	1940 Apr 22	1958 May 03
22	23	24
1976 May 13	1994 May 25	2012 Jun 04
25	26	27
2030 Jun 15	2048 Jun 26	2066 Jul 07
28	29	30
2084 Jul 17	2102 Jul 30	2120 Aug 09
31	32	33
2138 Aug 20	2156 Aug 30	2174 Sep 11
34
2192 Sep 21

=== Tritos series ===
This eclipse is a part of a tritos cycle, repeating at alternating nodes every 135 synodic months (≈ 3986.63 days, or 11 years minus 1 month). Their appearance and longitude are irregular due to a lack of synchronization with the anomalistic month (period of perigee), but groupings of 3 tritos cycles (≈ 33 years minus 3 months) come close (≈ 434.044 anomalistic months), so eclipses are similar in these groupings.

Series members between 1801 and 2200
1808 Nov 03 (Saros 123)	1819 Oct 03 (Saros 124)	1830 Sep 02 (Saros 125)	1841 Aug 02 (Saros 126)	1852 Jul 01 (Saros 127)
1863 Jun 01 (Saros 128)	1874 May 01 (Saros 129)	1885 Mar 30 (Saros 130)	1896 Feb 28 (Saros 131)	1907 Jan 29 (Saros 132)
1917 Dec 28 (Saros 133)	1928 Nov 27 (Saros 134)	1939 Oct 28 (Saros 135)	1950 Sep 26 (Saros 136)	1961 Aug 26 (Saros 137)
1972 Jul 26 (Saros 138)	1983 Jun 25 (Saros 139)	1994 May 25 (Saros 140)	2005 Apr 24 (Saros 141)	2016 Mar 23 (Saros 142)
2027 Feb 20 (Saros 143)	2038 Jan 21 (Saros 144)	2048 Dec 20 (Saros 145)	2059 Nov 19 (Saros 146)	2070 Oct 19 (Saros 147)
2081 Sep 18 (Saros 148)	2092 Aug 17 (Saros 149)	2103 Jul 19 (Saros 150)	2114 Jun 18 (Saros 151)	2125 May 17 (Saros 152)
2136 Apr 16 (Saros 153)			2169 Jan 13 (Saros 156)	
2190 Nov 12 (Saros 158)

=== Inex series ===
This eclipse is a part of the long period inex cycle, repeating at alternating nodes, every 358 synodic months (≈ 10,571.95 days, or 29 years minus 20 days). Their appearance and longitude are irregular due to a lack of synchronization with the anomalistic month (period of perigee). However, groupings of 3 inex cycles (≈ 87 years minus 2 months) comes close (≈ 1,151.02 anomalistic months), so eclipses are similar in these groupings.

Series members between 1801 and 2200
1820 Sep 22 (Saros 134)	1849 Sep 02 (Saros 135)	1878 Aug 13 (Saros 136)
1907 Jul 25 (Saros 137)	1936 Jul 04 (Saros 138)	1965 Jun 14 (Saros 139)
1994 May 25 (Saros 140)	2023 May 05 (Saros 141)	2052 Apr 14 (Saros 142)
2081 Mar 25 (Saros 143)	2110 Mar 06 (Saros 144)	2139 Feb 13 (Saros 145)
2168 Jan 24 (Saros 146)	2197 Jan 04 (Saros 147)	

=== Half-Saros cycle ===
A lunar eclipse will be preceded and followed by solar eclipses by 9 years and 5.5 days (a half saros). This lunar eclipse is related to two solar eclipses of Solar Saros 147.

May 19, 1985	May 31, 2003

== See also ==
- List of lunar eclipses
- List of 20th-century lunar eclipses
