= May 1958 lunar eclipse =

Partial lunar eclipse May 3, 1958

- Partial eclipse
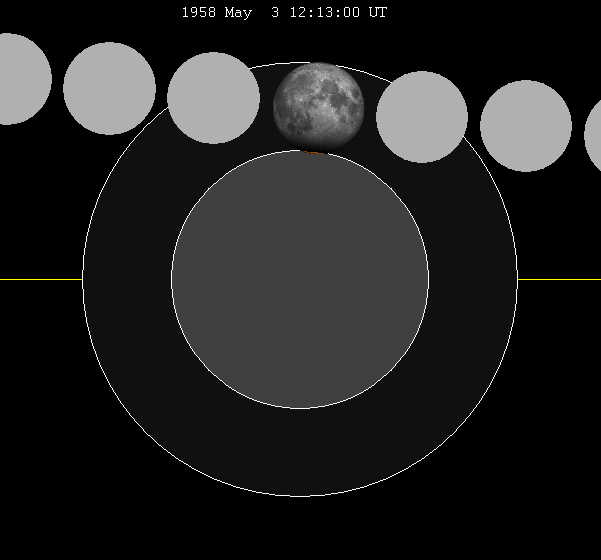
- The Moon's hourly motion shown right to left
- Date: May 3, 1958
- Gamma: 1.0188
- Magnitude: 0.0092
- Saros cycle: 140 (22 of 80)
- Partiality: 21 minutes, 2 seconds
- Penumbral: 242 minutes, 13 seconds
Contacts (UTC)
- P1: 10:11:48
- U1: 12:02:22
- Greatest: 12:12:57
- U4: 12:23:24
- P4: 14:14:01

A partial lunar eclipse occurred at the Moon’s ascending node of orbit on Saturday, May 3, 1958, with an umbral magnitude of 0.0092. A lunar eclipse occurs when the Moon moves into the Earth's shadow, causing the Moon to be darkened. A partial lunar eclipse occurs when one part of the Moon is in the Earth's umbra, while the other part is in the Earth's penumbra. Unlike a solar eclipse, which can only be viewed from a relatively small area of the world, a lunar eclipse may be viewed from anywhere on the night side of Earth. Occurring about 1.2 days after perigee (on May 2, 1958, at 7:00 UTC), the Moon's apparent diameter was larger.

== Visibility ==
The eclipse was completely visible over northeast Asia, Australia, and Antarctica, seen rising over east, southeast, and south Asia and setting over much of North America and western South America.

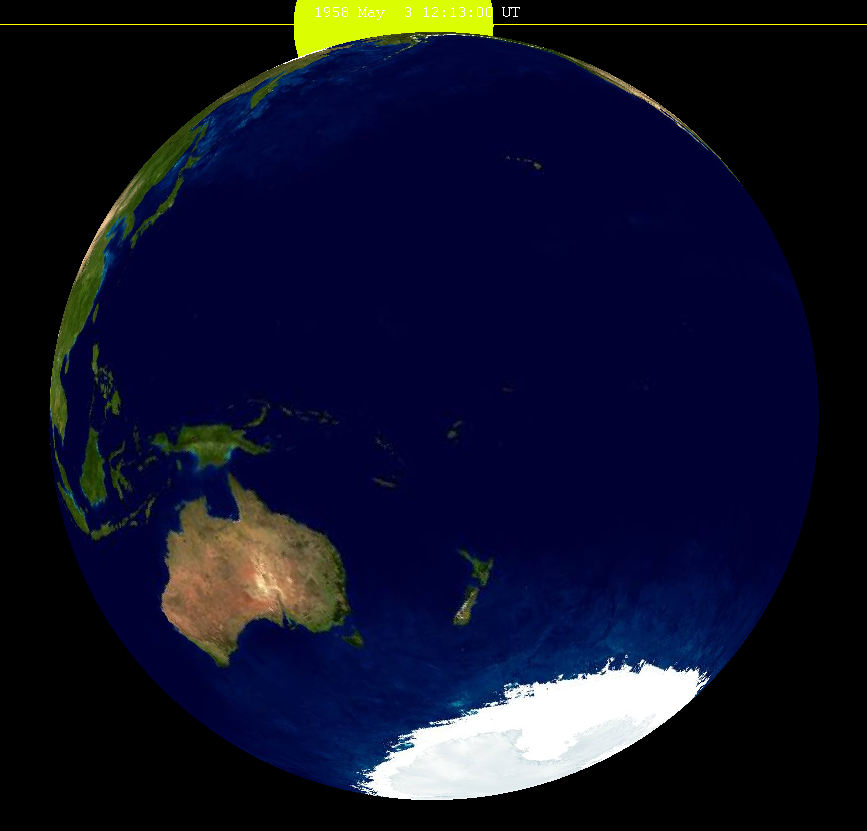
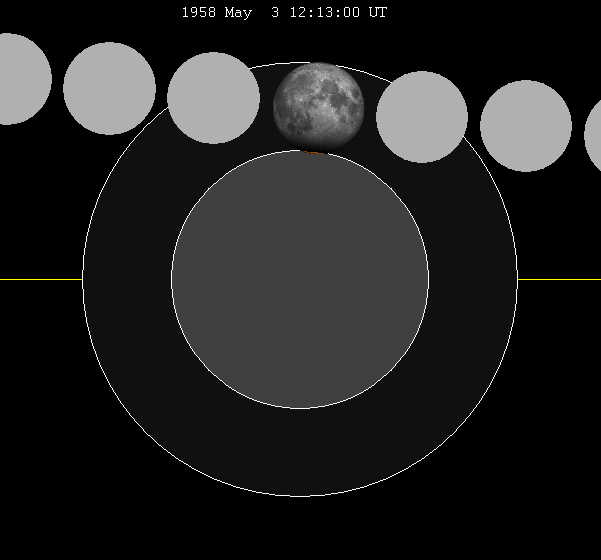

== Eclipse details ==
Shown below is a table displaying details about this particular lunar eclipse. It describes various parameters pertaining to this eclipse.

May 3, 1958 Lunar Eclipse Parameters
Parameter	Value
Penumbral Magnitude	0.96760
Umbral Magnitude	0.00919
Gamma	1.01884
Sun Right Ascension	02h40m25.8s
Sun Declination	+15°36'27.0"
Sun Semi-Diameter	15'51.8"
Sun Equatorial Horizontal Parallax	08.7"
Moon Right Ascension	14h41m19.7s
Moon Declination	-14°35'56.8"
Moon Semi-Diameter	16'33.1"
Moon Equatorial Horizontal Parallax	1°00'44.9"
ΔT	32.4 s

== Eclipse season ==
This eclipse is part of an eclipse season, a period, roughly every six months, when eclipses occur. Only two (or occasionally three) eclipse seasons occur each year, and each season lasts about 35 days and repeats just short of six months (173 days) later; thus two full eclipse seasons always occur each year. Either two or three eclipses happen each eclipse season. In the sequence below, each eclipse is separated by a fortnight. The first and last eclipse in this sequence is separated by one synodic month.

Eclipse season of April–May 1958
April 4 Ascending node (full moon)	April 19 Descending node (new moon)	May 3 Ascending node (full moon)
Penumbral lunar eclipse Lunar Saros 102	Annular solar eclipse Solar Saros 128	Partial lunar eclipse Lunar Saros 140

== Related eclipses ==
=== Eclipses in 1958 ===
- A penumbral lunar eclipse on April 4.
- An annular solar eclipse on April 19.
- A partial lunar eclipse on May 3.
- A total solar eclipse on October 12.
- A penumbral lunar eclipse on October 27.

=== Metonic ===
- Preceded by: Lunar eclipse of July 16, 1954
- Followed by: Lunar eclipse of February 19, 1962

=== Tzolkinex ===
- Preceded by: Lunar eclipse of March 23, 1951
- Followed by: Lunar eclipse of June 14, 1965

=== Half-Saros ===
- Preceded by: Solar eclipse of April 28, 1949
- Followed by: Solar eclipse of May 9, 1967

=== Tritos ===
- Preceded by: Lunar eclipse of June 3, 1947
- Followed by: Lunar eclipse of April 2, 1969

=== Lunar Saros 140 ===
- Preceded by: Lunar eclipse of April 22, 1940
- Followed by: Lunar eclipse of May 13, 1976

=== Inex ===
- Preceded by: Lunar eclipse of May 23, 1929
- Followed by: Lunar eclipse of April 14, 1987

=== Triad ===
- Preceded by: Lunar eclipse of July 2, 1871
- Followed by: Lunar eclipse of March 3, 2045

=== Lunar eclipses of 1955–1958 ===
This eclipse is a member of a semester series. An eclipse in a semester series of lunar eclipses repeats approximately every 177 days and 4 hours (a semester) at alternating nodes of the Moon's orbit.

The penumbral lunar eclipse on January 8, 1955 occurs in the previous lunar year eclipse set, and the penumbral lunar eclipse on April 4, 1958 occurs in the next lunar year eclipse set.

Lunar eclipse series sets from 1955 to 1958
Ascending node				Descending node			
Saros	Date Viewing	Type Chart	Gamma	Saros	Date Viewing	Type Chart	Gamma
110	1955 Jun 05	Penumbral	−1.2384	115	1955 Nov 29	Partial	0.9551
120	1956 May 24	Partial	−0.4726	125	1956 Nov 18	Total	0.2917
130	1957 May 13	Total	0.3046	135	1957 Nov 07	Total	−0.4332
140	1958 May 03	Partial	1.0188	145	1958 Oct 27	Penumbral	−1.1571

=== Saros 140 ===
This eclipse is a part of Saros series 140, repeating every 18 years, 11 days, and containing 77 events. The series started with a penumbral lunar eclipse on September 25, 1597. It contains partial eclipses from May 3, 1958 through July 17, 2084; total eclipses from July 30, 2102 through May 21, 2589; and a second set of partial eclipses from June 2, 2607 through August 7, 2715. The series ends at member 77 as a penumbral eclipse on January 6, 2968.

The longest duration of totality will be produced by member 38 at 98 minutes, 36 seconds on November 4, 2264. All eclipses in this series occur at the Moon’s ascending node of orbit.

Greatest	First			
The greatest eclipse of the series will occur on 2264 Nov 04, lasting 98 minutes, 36 seconds.	Penumbral	Partial	Total	Central
The greatest eclipse of the series will occur on 2264 Nov 04, lasting 98 minutes, 36 seconds.	1597 Sep 25	1958 May 03	2102 Jul 30	2156 Aug 30
The greatest eclipse of the series will occur on 2264 Nov 04, lasting 98 minutes, 36 seconds.	Last			
The greatest eclipse of the series will occur on 2264 Nov 04, lasting 98 minutes, 36 seconds.	Central	Total	Partial	Penumbral
The greatest eclipse of the series will occur on 2264 Nov 04, lasting 98 minutes, 36 seconds.	2535 Apr 19	2589 May 21	2715 Aug 07	2968 Jan 06

Eclipses are tabulated in three columns; every third eclipse in the same column is one exeligmos apart, so they all cast shadows over approximately the same parts of the Earth.

Series members 13–34 occur between 1801 and 2200:
13	14	15
1814 Feb 04	1832 Feb 16	1850 Feb 26
16	17	18
1868 Mar 08	1886 Mar 20	1904 Mar 31
19	20	21
1922 Apr 11	1940 Apr 22	1958 May 03
22	23	24
1976 May 13	1994 May 25	2012 Jun 04
25	26	27
2030 Jun 15	2048 Jun 26	2066 Jul 07
28	29	30
2084 Jul 17	2102 Jul 30	2120 Aug 09
31	32	33
2138 Aug 20	2156 Aug 30	2174 Sep 11
34
2192 Sep 21

=== Tritos series ===
This eclipse is a part of a tritos cycle, repeating at alternating nodes every 135 synodic months (≈ 3986.63 days, or 11 years minus 1 month). Their appearance and longitude are irregular due to a lack of synchronization with the anomalistic month (period of perigee), but groupings of 3 tritos cycles (≈ 33 years minus 3 months) come close (≈ 434.044 anomalistic months), so eclipses are similar in these groupings.

Series members between 1801 and 2132
1805 Jul 11 (Saros 126)	1816 Jun 10 (Saros 127)	1827 May 11 (Saros 128)	1838 Apr 10 (Saros 129)	1849 Mar 09 (Saros 130)
1860 Feb 07 (Saros 131)	1871 Jan 06 (Saros 132)	1881 Dec 05 (Saros 133)	1892 Nov 04 (Saros 134)	1903 Oct 06 (Saros 135)
1914 Sep 04 (Saros 136)	1925 Aug 04 (Saros 137)	1936 Jul 04 (Saros 138)	1947 Jun 03 (Saros 139)	1958 May 03 (Saros 140)
1969 Apr 02 (Saros 141)	1980 Mar 01 (Saros 142)	1991 Jan 30 (Saros 143)	2001 Dec 30 (Saros 144)	2012 Nov 28 (Saros 145)
2023 Oct 28 (Saros 146)	2034 Sep 28 (Saros 147)	2045 Aug 27 (Saros 148)	2056 Jul 26 (Saros 149)	2067 Jun 27 (Saros 150)
2132 Dec 22 (Saros 156)

=== Inex series ===
This eclipse is a part of the long period inex cycle, repeating at alternating nodes, every 358 synodic months (≈ 10,571.95 days, or 29 years minus 20 days). Their appearance and longitude are irregular due to a lack of synchronization with the anomalistic month (period of perigee). However, groupings of 3 inex cycles (≈ 87 years minus 2 months) comes close (≈ 1,151.02 anomalistic months), so eclipses are similar in these groupings.

Series members between 1801 and 2200
1813 Aug 12 (Saros 135)	1842 Jul 22 (Saros 136)	1871 Jul 02 (Saros 137)
1900 Jun 13 (Saros 138)	1929 May 23 (Saros 139)	1958 May 03 (Saros 140)
1987 Apr 14 (Saros 141)	2016 Mar 23 (Saros 142)	2045 Mar 03 (Saros 143)
2074 Feb 11 (Saros 144)	2103 Jan 23 (Saros 145)	2132 Jan 02 (Saros 146)
2160 Dec 13 (Saros 147)	2189 Nov 22 (Saros 148)	

=== Half-Saros cycle ===
A lunar eclipse will be preceded and followed by solar eclipses by 9 years and 5.5 days (a half saros). This lunar eclipse is related to two partial solar eclipses of Solar Saros 147.

April 28, 1949	May 9, 1967

== See also ==
- List of 20th-century lunar eclipses
- Lists of lunar eclipses
