= June 2048 lunar eclipse =

Astronomical event

- Partial eclipse
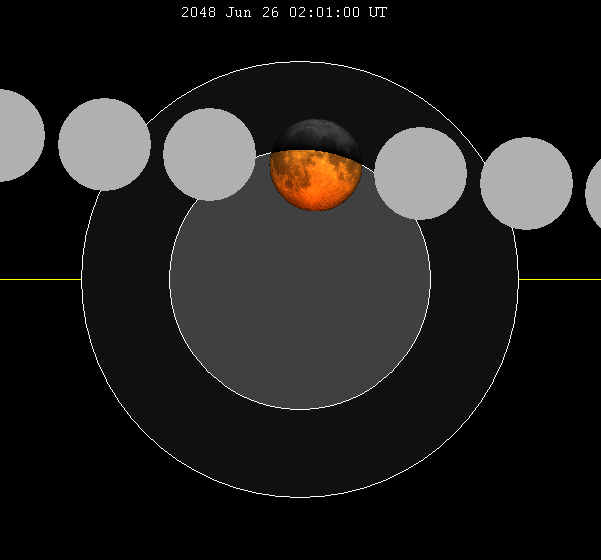
- The Moon's hourly motion shown right to left
- Date: June 25–26, 2048
- Gamma: 0.6796
- Magnitude: 0.6404
- Saros cycle: 140 (26 of 77)
- Partiality: 159 minutes, 10 seconds
- Penumbral: 285 minutes, 44 seconds
Contacts (UTC)
- P1: 23:38:05
- U1: 0:41:21
- Greatest: 2:00:57
- U4: 3:20:30
- P4: 4:23:49

A partial lunar eclipse will occur at the Moon’s ascending node of orbit on Thursday, June 25 and Friday, June 26, 2048, with an umbral magnitude of 0.6404. A lunar eclipse occurs when the Moon moves into the Earth's shadow, causing the Moon to be darkened. A partial lunar eclipse occurs when one part of the Moon is in the Earth's umbra, while the other part is in the Earth's penumbra. Unlike a solar eclipse, which can only be viewed from a relatively small area of the world, a lunar eclipse may be viewed from anywhere on the night side of Earth. Occurring only about 21 hours after perigee (on June 25, 2048, at 5:50 UTC), the Moon's apparent diameter will be larger.

== Visibility ==
The eclipse will be completely visible over South America, west and southern Africa, and Antarctica, seen rising over much of North America and setting over Europe, east Africa, and west, central, and south Asia.

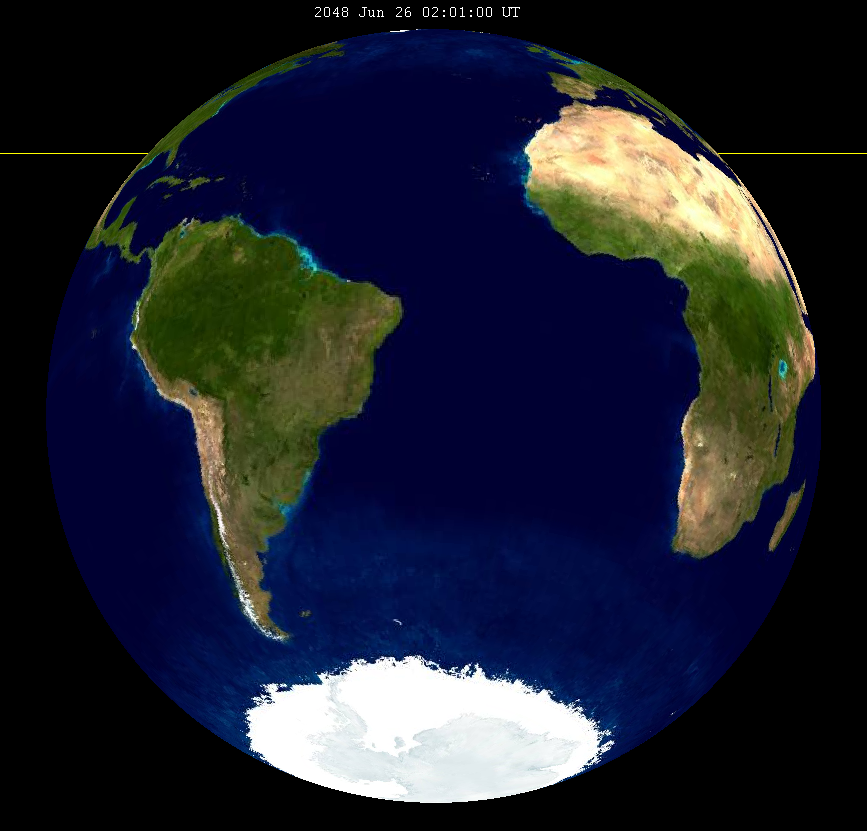
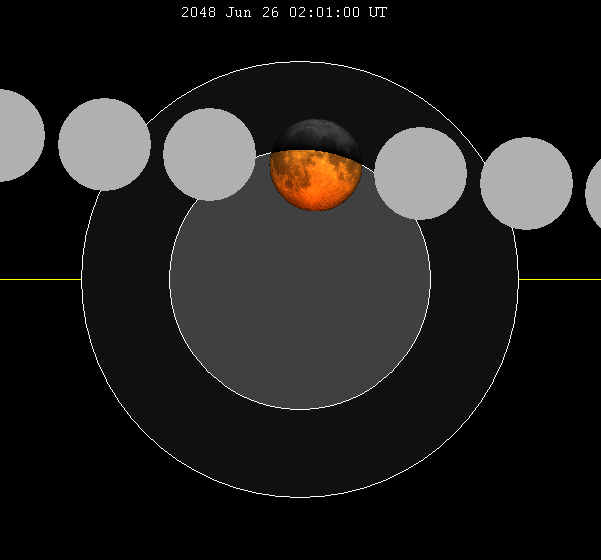

== Eclipse details ==
Shown below is a table displaying details about this particular lunar eclipse. It describes various parameters pertaining to this eclipse.

June 25–26, 2048 Lunar Eclipse Parameters
Parameter	Value
Penumbral Magnitude	1.58412
Umbral Magnitude	0.64039
Gamma	0.67965
Sun Right Ascension	06h22m31.9s
Sun Declination	+23°19'54.0"
Sun Semi-Diameter	15'44.1"
Sun Equatorial Horizontal Parallax	08.7"
Moon Right Ascension	18h22m07.4s
Moon Declination	-22°38'42.2"
Moon Semi-Diameter	16'40.4"
Moon Equatorial Horizontal Parallax	1°01'11.5"
ΔT	84.1 s

== Eclipse season ==
This eclipse is part of an eclipse season, a period, roughly every six months, when eclipses occur. Only two (or occasionally three) eclipse seasons occur each year, and each season lasts about 35 days and repeats just short of six months (173 days) later; thus two full eclipse seasons always occur each year. Either two or three eclipses happen each eclipse season. In the sequence below, each eclipse is separated by a fortnight.

Eclipse season of June 2048
June 11 Descending node (new moon)	June 25–26 Ascending node (full moon)
Annular solar eclipse Solar Saros 128	Partial lunar eclipse Lunar Saros 140

== Related eclipses ==
=== Eclipses in 2048 ===
- A total lunar eclipse on January 1.
- An annular solar eclipse on June 11.
- A partial lunar eclipse on June 25–26.
- A total solar eclipse on December 5.
- A penumbral lunar eclipse on December 20.

=== Metonic ===
- Preceded by: Lunar eclipse of September 7, 2044
- Followed by: Lunar eclipse of April 13–14, 2052

=== Tzolkinex ===
- Preceded by: Lunar eclipse of May 15–16, 2041
- Followed by: Lunar eclipse of August 7, 2055

=== Half-Saros ===
- Preceded by: Solar eclipse of June 21, 2039
- Followed by: Solar eclipse of July 1, 2057

=== Tritos ===
- Preceded by: Lunar eclipse of July 27, 2037
- Followed by: Lunar eclipse of May 27, 2059

=== Lunar Saros 140 ===
- Preceded by: Lunar eclipse of June 15, 2030
- Followed by: Lunar eclipse of July 7, 2066

=== Inex ===
- Preceded by: Lunar eclipse of July 16, 2019
- Followed by: Lunar eclipse of June 6, 2077

=== Triad ===
- Preceded by: Lunar eclipse of August 26, 1961
- Followed by: Lunar eclipse of April 28, 2135

=== Lunar eclipses of 2046–2049 ===
This eclipse is a member of a semester series. An eclipse in a semester series of lunar eclipses repeats approximately every 177 days and 4 hours (a semester) at alternating nodes of the Moon's orbit.

The penumbral lunar eclipses on May 17, 2049 and November 9, 2049 occur in the next lunar year eclipse set.

Lunar eclipse series sets from 2046 to 2049
Descending node				Ascending node			
Saros	Date Viewing	Type Chart	Gamma	Saros	Date Viewing	Type Chart	Gamma
115	2046 Jan 22	Partial	0.9885	120	2046 Jul 18	Partial	−0.8691
125	2047 Jan 12	Total	0.3317	130	2047 Jul 07	Total	−0.0636
135	2048 Jan 01	Total	−0.3745	140	2048 Jun 26	Partial	0.6796
145	2048 Dec 20	Penumbral	−1.0624	150	2049 Jun 15	Penumbral	1.4068

=== Saros 140 ===
This eclipse is a part of Saros series 140, repeating every 18 years, 11 days, and containing 77 events. The series started with a penumbral lunar eclipse on September 25, 1597. It contains partial eclipses from May 3, 1958 through July 17, 2084; total eclipses from July 30, 2102 through May 21, 2589; and a second set of partial eclipses from June 2, 2607 through August 7, 2715. The series ends at member 77 as a penumbral eclipse on January 6, 2968.

The longest duration of totality will be produced by member 38 at 98 minutes, 36 seconds on November 4, 2264. All eclipses in this series occur at the Moon’s ascending node of orbit.

Greatest	First			
The greatest eclipse of the series will occur on 2264 Nov 04, lasting 98 minutes, 36 seconds.	Penumbral	Partial	Total	Central
The greatest eclipse of the series will occur on 2264 Nov 04, lasting 98 minutes, 36 seconds.	1597 Sep 25	1958 May 03	2102 Jul 30	2156 Aug 30
The greatest eclipse of the series will occur on 2264 Nov 04, lasting 98 minutes, 36 seconds.	Last			
The greatest eclipse of the series will occur on 2264 Nov 04, lasting 98 minutes, 36 seconds.	Central	Total	Partial	Penumbral
The greatest eclipse of the series will occur on 2264 Nov 04, lasting 98 minutes, 36 seconds.	2535 Apr 19	2589 May 21	2715 Aug 07	2968 Jan 06

Eclipses are tabulated in three columns; every third eclipse in the same column is one exeligmos apart, so they all cast shadows over approximately the same parts of the Earth.

Series members 13–34 occur between 1801 and 2200:
13	14	15
1814 Feb 04	1832 Feb 16	1850 Feb 26
16	17	18
1868 Mar 08	1886 Mar 20	1904 Mar 31
19	20	21
1922 Apr 11	1940 Apr 22	1958 May 03
22	23	24
1976 May 13	1994 May 25	2012 Jun 04
25	26	27
2030 Jun 15	2048 Jun 26	2066 Jul 07
28	29	30
2084 Jul 17	2102 Jul 30	2120 Aug 09
31	32	33
2138 Aug 20	2156 Aug 30	2174 Sep 11
34
2192 Sep 21

=== Tritos series ===
This eclipse is a part of a tritos cycle, repeating at alternating nodes every 135 synodic months (≈ 3986.63 days, or 11 years minus 1 month). Their appearance and longitude are irregular due to a lack of synchronization with the anomalistic month (period of perigee), but groupings of 3 tritos cycles (≈ 33 years minus 3 months) come close (≈ 434.044 anomalistic months), so eclipses are similar in these groupings.

Series members between 1801 and 2200
1808 May 10 (Saros 118)	1819 Apr 10 (Saros 119)	1830 Mar 09 (Saros 120)	1841 Feb 06 (Saros 121)	1852 Jan 07 (Saros 122)
1862 Dec 06 (Saros 123)	1873 Nov 04 (Saros 124)	1884 Oct 04 (Saros 125)	1895 Sep 04 (Saros 126)	1906 Aug 04 (Saros 127)
1917 Jul 04 (Saros 128)	1928 Jun 03 (Saros 129)	1939 May 03 (Saros 130)	1950 Apr 02 (Saros 131)	1961 Mar 02 (Saros 132)
1972 Jan 30 (Saros 133)	1982 Dec 30 (Saros 134)	1993 Nov 29 (Saros 135)	2004 Oct 28 (Saros 136)	2015 Sep 28 (Saros 137)
2026 Aug 28 (Saros 138)	2037 Jul 27 (Saros 139)	2048 Jun 26 (Saros 140)	2059 May 27 (Saros 141)	2070 Apr 25 (Saros 142)
2081 Mar 25 (Saros 143)	2092 Feb 23 (Saros 144)	2103 Jan 23 (Saros 145)	2113 Dec 22 (Saros 146)	2124 Nov 21 (Saros 147)
2135 Oct 22 (Saros 148)	2146 Sep 20 (Saros 149)	2157 Aug 20 (Saros 150)	2168 Jul 20 (Saros 151)	2179 Jun 19 (Saros 152)
2190 May 19 (Saros 153)

=== Inex series ===
This eclipse is a part of the long period inex cycle, repeating at alternating nodes, every 358 synodic months (≈ 10,571.95 days, or 29 years minus 20 days). Their appearance and longitude are irregular due to a lack of synchronization with the anomalistic month (period of perigee). However, groupings of 3 inex cycles (≈ 87 years minus 2 months) comes close (≈ 1,151.02 anomalistic months), so eclipses are similar in these groupings.

Series members between 1801 and 2200
1816 Dec 04 (Saros 132)	1845 Nov 14 (Saros 133)	1874 Oct 25 (Saros 134)
1903 Oct 06 (Saros 135)	1932 Sep 14 (Saros 136)	1961 Aug 26 (Saros 137)
1990 Aug 06 (Saros 138)	2019 Jul 16 (Saros 139)	2048 Jun 26 (Saros 140)
2077 Jun 06 (Saros 141)	2106 May 17 (Saros 142)	2135 Apr 28 (Saros 143)
2164 Apr 07 (Saros 144)	2193 Mar 17 (Saros 145)	

=== Half-Saros cycle ===
A lunar eclipse will be preceded and followed by solar eclipses by 9 years and 5.5 days (a half saros). This lunar eclipse is related to two annular solar eclipses of Solar Saros 147.

June 21, 2039	July 1, 2057

== See also ==
- List of lunar eclipses and List of 21st-century lunar eclipses
