= Lunar Saros 140 =

Eclipse cycle of the moon

Member 24
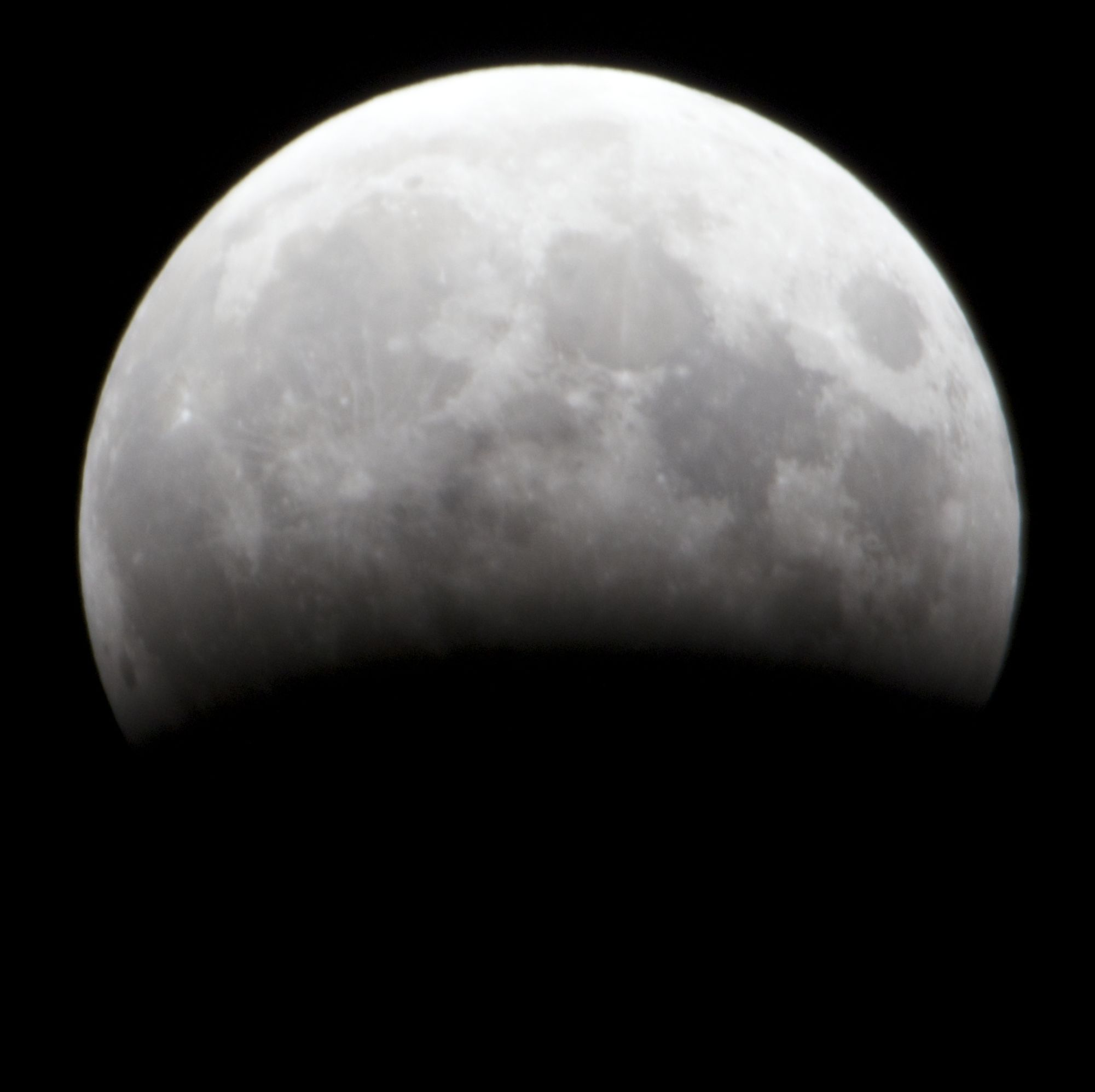
June 4, 2012

Saros cycle series 140 for lunar eclipses occurs at the moon's ascending node, 18 years 11 and 1/3 days. It contains 77 events.

This lunar saros is linked to Solar Saros 147.

== List ==
Cat.	Saros	Mem	Date	Time UT (hr:mn)	Type	Gamma	Magnitude	Duration (min)			Contacts UT (hr:mn)						Chart
Cat.	Saros	Mem	Date	Greatest	Type	Gamma	Magnitude	Pen.	Par.	Tot.	P1	P4	U1	U2	U3	U4	Chart
08660	140	1	1597 Sep 25	13:40:53	Penumbral	1.5117	-0.9238	86.7			12:57:32	14:24:14					
08705	140	2	1615 Oct 06	21:30:17	Penumbral	1.4676	-0.8429	117.5			20:31:32	22:29:02					
08749	140	3	1633 Oct 17	5:29:19	Penumbral	1.4306	-0.7750	137.3			4:20:40	6:37:58					
08793	140	4	1651 Oct 28	13:37:37	Penumbral	1.4003	-0.7192	151.1			12:22:04	14:53:10					
08838	140	5	1669 Nov 07	21:54:08	Penumbral	1.3760	-0.6745	160.9			20:33:41	23:14:35					
08884	140	6	1687 Nov 19	6:18:50	Penumbral	1.3575	-0.6401	167.6			4:55:02	7:42:38					
08930	140	7	1705 Nov 30	14:50:04	Penumbral	1.3439	-0.6145	172.0			13:24:04	16:16:04					
08977	140	8	1723 Dec 11	23:25:51	Penumbral	1.3333	-0.5944	175.2			21:58:15	0:53:27					
09023	140	9	1741 Dec 22	8:05:41	Penumbral	1.3256	-0.5792	177.1			6:37:08	9:34:14					
09070	140	10	1760 Jan 02	16:47:25	Penumbral	1.3191	-0.5661	178.6			15:18:07	18:16:43					
09116	140	11	1778 Jan 13	1:29:24	Penumbral	1.3124	-0.5522	180.0			23:59:24	2:59:24					
09161	140	12	1796 Jan 24	10:09:20	Penumbral	1.3035	-0.5341	182.0			8:38:20	11:40:20					
09206	140	13	1814 Feb 04	18:47:01	Penumbral	1.2926	-0.5122	184.5			17:14:46	20:19:16					
09251	140	14	1832 Feb 16	3:20:41	Penumbral	1.2783	-0.4838	188.0			1:46:41	4:54:41					
09298	140	15	1850 Feb 26	11:48:11	Penumbral	1.2587	-0.4453	192.8			10:11:47	13:24:35					
09342	140	16	1868 Mar 08	20:09:48	Penumbral	1.2339	-0.3975	198.9			18:30:21	21:49:15					
09385	140	17	1886 Mar 20	4:24:16	Penumbral	1.2029	-0.3381	206.1			2:41:13	6:07:19					
09429	140	18	1904 Mar 31	12:32:28	Penumbral	1.1665	-0.2688	214.2			10:45:22	14:19:34					
09471	140	19	1922 Apr 11	20:32:12	Penumbral	1.1228	-0.1863	223.2			18:40:36	22:23:48					
09513	140	20	1940 Apr 22	4:26:25	Penumbral	1.0741	-0.0945	232.5			2:30:10	6:22:40					
09554	140	21	1958 May 03	12:13:29	Partial	1.0188	0.0092	242.2	21.0		10:12:23	14:14:35	12:02:59			12:23:59	
09595	140	22	1976 May 13	19:55:08	Partial	0.9585	0.1217	251.8	75.4		17:49:14	22:01:02	19:17:26			20:32:50	
09636	140	23	1994 May 25	3:31:20	Partial	0.8933	0.2432	261.2	104.6		1:20:44	5:41:56	2:39:02			4:23:38	
09677	140	24	2012 Jun 04	11:04:20	Partial	0.8247	0.3704	270.0	126.6		8:49:20	13:19:20	10:01:02			12:07:38	
09718	140	25	2030 Jun 15	18:34:34	Partial	0.7534	0.5025	278.2	144.4		16:15:28	20:53:40	17:22:22			19:46:46	
09758	140	26	2048 Jun 26	2:02:28	Partial	0.6796	0.6388	285.7	159.2		23:39:37	4:25:19	0:42:52			3:22:04	
09799	140	27	2066 Jul 07	9:30:29	Partial	0.6055	0.7753	292.3	171.3		7:04:20	11:56:38	8:04:50			10:56:08	
09840	140	28	2084 Jul 17	16:58:51	Partial	0.5312	0.9119	298.1	181.4		14:29:48	19:27:54	15:28:09			18:29:33	
09882	140	29	2102 Jul 30	0:29:10	Total	0.4586	1.0451	303.0	189.5	31.3	21:57:40	3:00:40	22:54:25	0:13:31	0:44:49	2:03:55	
09924	140	30	2120 Aug 09	8:01:32	Total	0.3875	1.1751	307.1	195.9	59.3	5:27:59	10:35:05	6:23:35	7:31:53	8:31:11	9:39:29	
09967	140	31	2138 Aug 20	15:38:46	Total	0.3204	1.2977	310.4	200.9	74.3	13:03:34	18:13:58	13:58:19	15:01:37	16:15:55	17:19:13	
10012	140	32	2156 Aug 30	23:20:37	Total	0.2569	1.4132	313.0	204.6	83.9	20:44:07	1:57:07	21:38:19	22:38:40	0:02:34	1:02:55	
10055	140	33	2174 Sep 11	7:08:03	Total	0.1982	1.5197	315.0	207.3	90.3	4:30:33	9:45:33	5:24:24	6:22:54	7:53:12	8:51:42	
10098	140	34	2192 Sep 21	15:02:17	Total	0.1453	1.6154	316.5	209.1	94.4	12:24:02	17:40:32	13:17:44	14:15:05	15:49:29	16:46:50	
10141	140	35	2210 Oct 03	23:03:49	Total	0.0988	1.6993	317.6	210.2	96.8	20:25:01	1:42:37	21:18:43	22:15:25	23:52:13	0:48:55	
10185	140	36	2228 Oct 14	7:13:09	Total	0.0586	1.7713	318.5	210.8	98.0	4:33:54	9:52:24	5:27:45	6:24:09	8:02:09	8:58:33	
10230	140	37	2246 Oct 25	15:28:38	Total	0.0236	1.8339	319.2	211.1	98.6	12:49:02	18:08:14	13:43:05	14:39:20	16:17:56	17:14:11	
10276	140	38	2264 Nov 04	23:52:49	Total	-0.0039	1.8685	319.8	211.2	98.6	21:12:55	2:32:43	22:07:13	23:03:31	0:42:07	1:38:25	
10322	140	39	2282 Nov 16	8:23:04	Total	-0.0260	1.8261	320.3	211.2	98.4	5:42:55	11:03:13	6:37:28	7:33:52	9:12:16	10:08:40	
10368	140	40	2300 Nov 27	17:00:33	Total	-0.0421	1.7950	320.8	211.2	98.1	14:20:09	19:40:57	15:14:57	16:11:30	17:49:36	18:46:09	
10414	140	41	2318 Dec 09	1:41:59	Total	-0.0546	1.7707	321.3	211.2	97.8	23:01:20	4:22:38	23:56:23	0:53:05	2:30:53	3:27:35	
10460	140	42	2336 Dec 19	10:28:54	Total	-0.0624	1.7552	321.9	211.3	97.6	7:47:57	13:09:51	8:43:15	9:40:06	11:17:42	12:14:33	
10506	140	43	2354 Dec 30	19:17:27	Total	-0.0685	1.7430	322.5	211.4	97.5	16:36:12	21:58:42	17:31:45	18:28:42	20:06:12	21:03:09	
10552	140	44	2373 Jan 10	4:07:33	Total	-0.0728	1.7343	323.0	211.6	97.4	1:26:03	6:49:03	2:21:45	3:18:51	4:56:15	5:53:21	
10596	140	45	2391 Jan 21	12:56:41	Total	-0.0775	1.7249	323.6	211.8	97.3	10:14:53	15:38:29	11:10:47	12:08:02	13:45:20	14:42:35	
10641	140	46	2409 Jan 31	21:44:38	Total	-0.0827	1.7150	324.2	212.0	97.3	19:02:32	0:26:44	19:58:38	20:55:59	22:33:17	23:30:38	
10685	140	47	2427 Feb 12	6:28:08	Total	-0.0913	1.6991	324.7	212.2	97.1	3:45:47	9:10:29	4:42:02	5:39:35	7:16:41	8:14:14	
10729	140	48	2445 Feb 22	15:07:08	Total	-0.1033	1.6771	325.2	212.4	96.7	12:24:32	17:49:44	13:20:56	14:18:47	15:55:29	16:53:20	
10772	140	49	2463 Mar 05	23:39:34	Total	-0.1201	1.6462	325.5	212.5	96.1	20:56:49	2:22:19	21:53:19	22:51:31	0:27:37	1:25:49	
10814	140	50	2481 Mar 16	8:06:00	Total	-0.1415	1.6072	325.8	212.3	95.0	5:23:06	10:48:54	6:19:51	7:18:30	8:53:30	9:52:09	
10855	140	51	2499 Mar 27	16:22:54	Total	-0.1705	1.5542	325.9	211.9	93.1	13:39:57	19:05:51	14:36:57	15:36:21	17:09:27	18:08:51	
10896	140	52	2517 Apr 08	0:32:52	Total	-0.2048	1.4914	325.8	211.1	90.2	21:49:58	3:15:46	22:47:19	23:47:46	1:17:58	2:18:25	
10936	140	53	2535 Apr 19	8:33:01	Total	-0.2470	1.4141	325.3	209.6	85.6	5:50:22	11:15:40	6:48:13	7:50:13	9:15:49	10:17:49	
10978	140	54	2553 Apr 29	16:26:25	Total	-0.2942	1.3276	324.4	207.4	78.8	13:44:13	19:08:37	14:42:43	15:47:01	17:05:49	18:10:07	
11020	140	55	2571 May 11	0:09:06	Total	-0.3498	1.2255	322.8	204.0	67.9	21:27:42	2:50:30	22:27:06	23:35:09	0:43:03	1:51:06	
11060	140	56	2589 May 21	7:46:01	Total	-0.4096	1.1156	320.5	199.4	50.5	5:05:46	10:26:16	6:06:19	7:20:46	8:11:16	9:25:43	
11100	140	57	2607 Jun 02	15:13:55	Partial	-0.4765	0.9923	317.3	193.0		12:35:16	17:52:34	13:37:25			16:50:25	
11140	140	58	2625 Jun 12	22:36:39	Partial	-0.5468	0.8628	313.2	184.8		20:00:03	1:13:15	21:04:15			0:09:03	
11181	140	59	2643 Jun 24	5:52:24	Partial	-0.6220	0.7237	307.8	173.8		3:18:30	8:26:18	4:25:30			7:19:18	
11222	140	60	2661 Jul 04	13:05:13	Partial	-0.6987	0.5818	301.2	160.0		10:34:37	15:35:49	11:45:13			14:25:13	
11265	140	61	2679 Jul 15	20:14:10	Partial	-0.7779	0.4350	293.3	142.0		17:47:31	22:40:49	19:03:10			21:25:10	
11307	140	62	2697 Jul 26	3:21:15	Partial	-0.8574	0.2873	283.9	118.4		0:59:18	5:43:12	2:22:03			4:20:27	
11350	140	63	2715 Aug 07	10:27:45	Partial	-0.9365	0.1402	273.1	84.7		8:11:12	12:44:18	9:45:24			11:10:06	
11392	140	64	2733 Aug 17	17:35:07	Penumbral	-1.0138	-0.0040	260.8			15:24:43	19:45:31					
11435	140	65	2751 Aug 29	0:44:37	Penumbral	-1.0883	-0.1432	247.2			22:41:01	2:48:13					
11479	140	66	2769 Sep 08	7:56:48	Penumbral	-1.1596	-0.2767	232.3			6:00:39	9:52:57					
11524	140	67	2787 Sep 19	15:14:14	Penumbral	-1.2257	-0.4009	216.3			13:26:05	17:02:23					
11570	140	68	2805 Sep 29	22:36:36	Penumbral	-1.2869	-0.5162	199.3			20:56:57	0:16:15					
11617	140	69	2823 Oct 11	6:05:12	Penumbral	-1.3420	-0.6203	181.6			4:34:24	7:36:00					
11664	140	70	2841 Oct 21	13:40:22	Penumbral	-1.3909	-0.7133	163.4			12:18:40	15:02:04					
11710	140	71	2859 Nov 01	21:23:01	Penumbral	-1.4327	-0.7930	145.3			20:10:22	22:35:40					
11756	140	72	2877 Nov 12	5:12:17	Penumbral	-1.4686	-0.8619	127.1			4:08:44	6:15:50					
11802	140	73	2895 Nov 23	13:07:29	Penumbral	-1.4989	-0.9203	108.9			12:13:02	14:01:56					
11847	140	74	2913 Dec 04	21:09:04	Penumbral	-1.5232	-0.9675	91.3			20:23:25	21:54:43					
11892	140	75	2931 Dec 16	5:16:05	Penumbral	-1.5420	-1.0044	74.6			4:38:47	5:53:23					
11937	140	76	2949 Dec 26	13:26:38	Penumbral	-1.5575	-1.0349	56.9			12:58:11	13:55:05					
11983	140	77	2968 Jan 06	21:40:03	Penumbral	-1.5698	-1.0594	36.9			21:21:36	21:58:30					

== See also ==
- List of lunar eclipses
  - List of Saros series for lunar eclipses
