= Solar Saros 147 =

Series of solar eclipses

Historic saros cycle animation

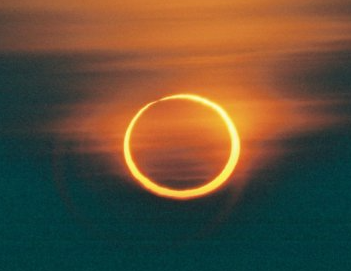
Solar eclipse of May 31, 2003 from Culloden, Scotland, member 22 of Saros series 147

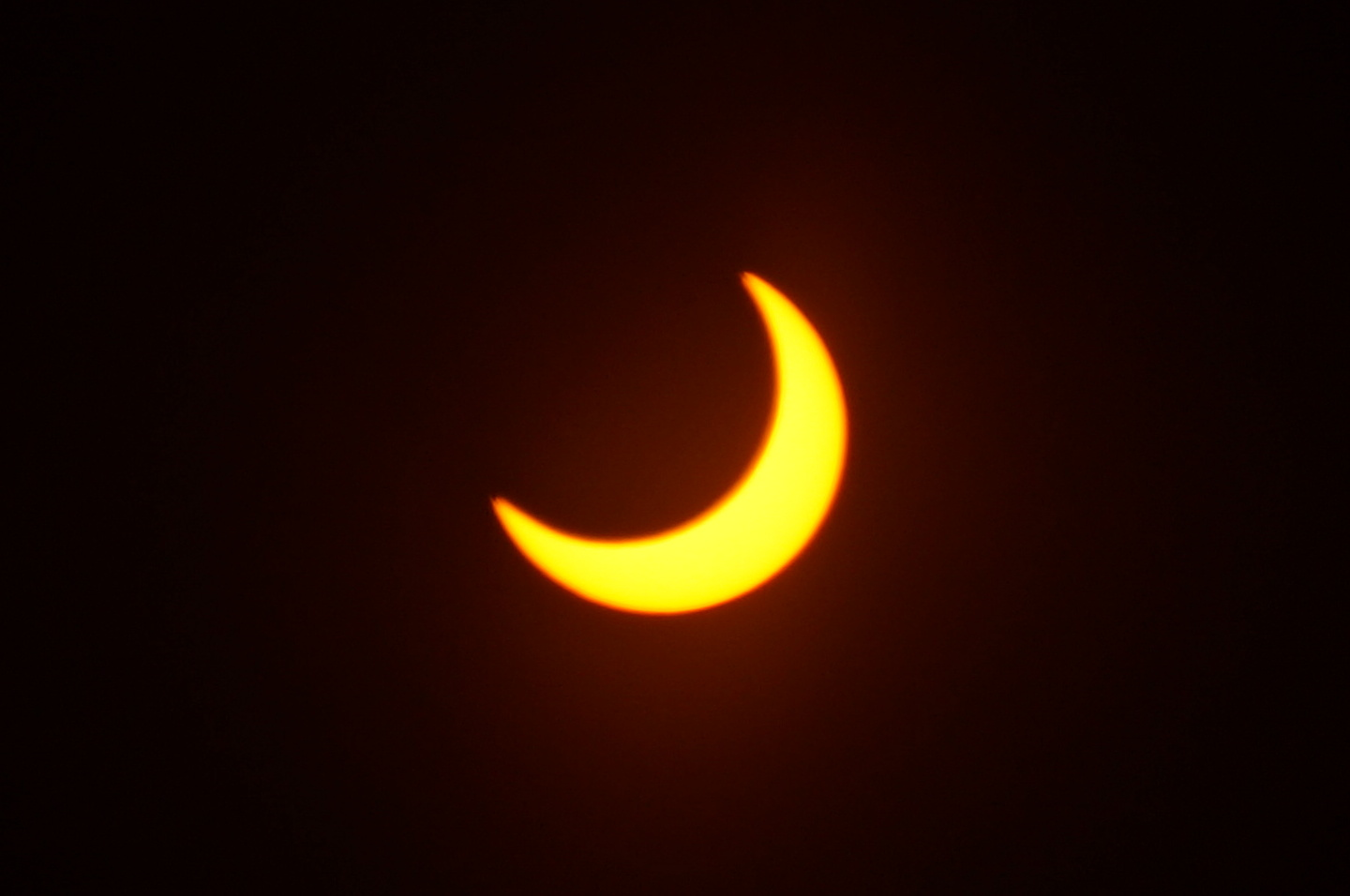
Partial solar eclipse of June 10, 2021 (of annular event) from Halifax, Canada, member 23 of Saros series 147

Saros cycle series 147 for solar eclipses occurs at the Moon's ascending node, repeating every 18 years, 11 days, containing 80 eclipses, 40 of which are umbral, all annular. The first eclipse in the series was on 12 October 1624 and the last will be on 24 February 3049. The most recent was on 10 June 2021 and the next will be on 21 June 2039.

== Progression of the series ==
Solar Saros 147 follows the typical progression of a solar saros series, beginning and ending with partial eclipses and containing a sequence of central eclipses in between. In this series, the first 21 eclipses are partial, followed by 40 annular eclipses from 2003 to 2706, and then 19 further partial eclipses from 2724 to 3049. The changing eclipse types reflect the gradual evolution of the relative positions of the Sun, Moon and Earth over the series.

The longest eclipse will be 9 minutes 41 seconds on 21 November 2291.

This solar saros is linked to Lunar Saros 140.

== Umbral eclipses ==
Umbral eclipses (annular, total and hybrid) can be further classified as either: 1) Central (two limits), 2) Central (one limit) or 3) Non-Central (one limit). The statistical distribution of these classes in Saros series 147 appears in the following table.

Classification	Number	Percent
All Umbral eclipses	40	100.00%
Central (two limits)	39	97.50%
Central (one limit)	1	2.50%
Non-central (one limit)	0	0.00%

== All eclipses ==
Saros	Member	Date	Time (Greatest) UTC	Type	Location Lat, Long	Gamma	Mag.	Width (km)	Duration (min:sec)	Ref
147	1	October 12, 1624	8:53:55	Partial	71.5N 109.9E	1.5466	0.0089			
147	2	October 23, 1642	16:48:36	Partial	71N 22.5W	1.5221	0.0551			
147	3	November 3, 1660	0:50:39	Partial	70.3N 156.2W	1.5038	0.0898			
147	4	November 14, 1678	8:58:14	Partial	69.4N 69.4E	1.4908	0.1148			
147	5	November 24, 1696	17:10:41	Partial	68.4N 65.6W	1.4822	0.1318			
147	6	December 7, 1714	1:27:09	Partial	67.4N 159E	1.4772	0.142			
147	7	December 17, 1732	9:46:57	Partial	66.3N 23.4E	1.4751	0.147			
147	8	December 28, 1750	18:06:51	Partial	65.3N 111.8W	1.4737	0.1506			
147	9	January 8, 1769	2:26:42	Partial	64.3N 113.5E	1.4728	0.153			
147	10	January 19, 1787	10:43:13	Partial	63.4N 20.1W	1.4697	0.1591			
147	11	January 30, 1805	18:57:01	Partial	62.7N 152.8W	1.4651	0.1675			
147	12	February 11, 1823	3:03:02	Partial	62N 76.7E	1.4546	0.1856			
147	13	February 21, 1841	11:03:56	Partial	61.5N 52.4W	1.4406	0.2095			
147	14	March 4, 1859	18:54:49	Partial	61.2N 178.8W	1.4192	0.2461			
147	15	March 15, 1877	2:38:09	Partial	61N 56.7E	1.3924	0.2917			
147	16	March 26, 1895	10:09:33	Partial	61N 64.8W	1.3565	0.3531			
147	17	April 6, 1913	17:33:07	Partial	61.2N 175.7E	1.3147	0.4244			
147	18	April 18, 1931	0:45:35	Partial	61.5N 58.9E	1.2643	0.5107			
147	19	April 28, 1949	7:48:53	Partial	61.9N 55.7W	1.2068	0.6092			
147	20	May 9, 1967	14:42:48	Partial	62.5N 168.1W	1.1422	0.7201			
147	21	May 19, 1985	21:29:38	Partial	63.2N 81.1E	1.072	0.8406			
147	22	May 31, 2003	4:09:22	Annular (Note: No northern limit)	66.6N 24.5W	0.996	0.9384	-	3m 37s	
147	23	June 10, 2021	10:43:07	Annular	80.8N 66.8W	0.9152	0.9435	527	3m 51s	
147	24	June 21, 2039	17:12:54	Annular	78.9N 102.1W	0.8312	0.9454	365	4m 5s	
147	25	July 1, 2057	23:40:15	Annular	71.5N 176.2W	0.7455	0.9464	298	4m 23s	
147	26	July 13, 2075	6:05:44	Annular	63.1N 95.2E	0.6583	0.9467	262	4m 45s	
147	27	July 23, 2093	12:32:04	Annular	54.6N 1.3E	0.5717	0.9463	241	5m 11s	
147	28	August 4, 2111	19:00:22	Annular	46N 95.3W	0.4867	0.9455	230	5m 42s	
147	29	August 15, 2129	1:33:05	Annular	37.4N 165.8E	0.4055	0.9442	225	6m 15s	
147	30	August 26, 2147	8:09:15	Annular	29N 65.2E	0.3271	0.9425	224	6m 49s	
147	31	September 5, 2165	14:52:45	Annular	20.7N 37.5W	0.2549	0.9406	227	7m 22s	
147	32	September 16, 2183	21:42:37	Annular	12.8N 141.9W	0.1877	0.9384	233	7m 53s	
147	33	September 28, 2201	4:41:51	Annular	5.2N 111.4E	0.1281	0.9361	240	8m 21s	
147	34	October 9, 2219	11:48:35	Annular	2S 3E	0.0744	0.9338	248	8m 46s	
147	35	October 19, 2237	19:06:04	Annular	8.6S 107.6W	0.0295	0.9316	256	9m 7s	
147	36	October 31, 2255	2:32:04	Annular	14.5S 140.2E	-0.0088	0.9295	264	9m 24s	
147	37	November 10, 2273	10:07:17	Annular	19.6S 26.3E	-0.0398	0.9278	272	9m 34s	
147	38	November 21, 2291	17:50:53	Annular	23.7S 88.9W	-0.0644	0.9263	278	9m 41s	
147	39	December 3, 2309	1:42:05	Annular	26.9S 154.6E	-0.0832	0.9254	282	9m 40s	
147	40	December 14, 2327	9:39:47	Annular	28.8S 37E	-0.0969	0.925	284	9m 34s	
147	41	December 24, 2345	17:41:04	Annular	29.7S 81.1W	-0.1081	0.9252	284	9m 21s	
147	42	January 5, 2364	1:46:48	Annular	29.4S 159.7E	-0.1161	0.9259	281	9m 3s	
147	43	January 15, 2382	9:53:22	Annular	28.1S 40.1E	-0.1241	0.9274	275	8m 40s	
147	44	January 26, 2400	18:00:10	Annular	26S 79.9W	-0.1322	0.9295	267	8m 13s	
147	45	February 6, 2418	2:04:04	Annular	23.3S 160.5E	-0.1431	0.9322	256	7m 43s	
147	46	February 17, 2436	10:05:24	Annular	20.2S 41.1E	-0.1567	0.9355	243	7m 12s	
147	47	February 27, 2454	18:01:47	Annular	17S 77.3W	-0.175	0.9393	228	6m 40s	
147	48	March 10, 2472	1:52:11	Annular	13.9S 165.6E	-0.1989	0.9436	212	6m 8s	
147	49	March 21, 2490	9:36:11	Annular	11.1S 50E	-0.2288	0.9482	195	5m 36s	
147	50	April 1, 2508	17:13:22	Annular	8.7S 63.9W	-0.2648	0.9532	177	5m 6s	
147	51	April 13, 2526	0:43:02	Annular	7.1S 175.8W	-0.3077	0.9583	158	4m 35s	
147	52	April 23, 2544	8:05:34	Annular	6.3S 74E	-0.3575	0.9635	140	4m 5s	
147	53	May 4, 2562	15:21:29	Annular	6.5S 34.5W	-0.4133	0.9686	123	3m 35s	
147	54	May 14, 2580	22:32:12	Annular	7.9S 141.9W	-0.4743	0.9735	107	3m 5s	
147	55	May 26, 2598	5:36:09	Annular	10.6S 112.1E	-0.5415	0.9782	91	2m 34s	
147	56	June 6, 2616	12:37:18	Annular	14.5S 6.3E	-0.6115	0.9824	78	2m 4s	
147	57	June 17, 2634	19:34:22	Annular	19.8S 99.1W	-0.6854	0.9862	67	1m 36s	
147	58	June 28, 2652	2:31:12	Annular	26.5S 154.7E	-0.7603	0.9892	58	1m 11s	
147	59	July 9, 2670	9:25:19	Annular	35S 48E	-0.8379	0.9915	55	0m 52s	
147	60	July 19, 2688	16:22:31	Annular	45.6S 61.4W	-0.9136	0.9926	64	0m 41s	
147	61	July 31, 2706	23:20:38	Annular	63S 178.8W	-0.9889	0.9911	240	0m 41s	
147	62	August 11, 2724	6:23:26	Partial	70.5S 56.2E	-1.061	0.8797			
147	63	August 22, 2742	13:29:55	Partial	71.2S 63W	-1.1308	0.7534			
147	64	September 1, 2760	20:44:19	Partial	71.7S 175.4E	-1.1947	0.6372			
147	65	September 13, 2778	4:05:03	Partial	72S 51.8E	-1.2541	0.5291			
147	66	September 23, 2796	11:33:43	Partial	72.1S 74W	-1.3078	0.431			
147	67	October 4, 2814	19:10:43	Partial	71.9S 158.2E	-1.3554	0.344			
147	68	October 15, 2832	2:57:22	Partial	71.6S 28.3E	-1.3962	0.2695			
147	69	October 26, 2850	10:52:49	Partial	71S 103.5W	-1.4306	0.2068			
147	70	November 5, 2868	18:57:09	Partial	70.2S 123.1E	-1.4586	0.1556			
147	71	November 17, 2886	3:10:24	Partial	69.3S 12W	-1.4801	0.1162			
147	72	November 28, 2904	11:32:06	Partial	68.3S 148.6W	-1.4959	0.0874			
147	73	December 9, 2922	19:59:54	Partial	67.3S 73.9E	-1.5074	0.0662			
147	74	December 20, 2940	4:34:38	Partial	66.2S 64.9W	-1.5142	0.0534			
147	75	December 31, 2958	13:13:25	Partial	65.2S 155.8E	-1.5186	0.045			
147	76	January 10, 2977	21:56:20	Partial	64.3S 15.9E	-1.5202	0.0413			
147	77	January 22, 2995	6:39:24	Partial	63.5S 123.8W	-1.5225	0.0363			
147	78	February 2, 3013	15:24:30	Partial	62.8S 96.3E	-1.5238	0.0326			
147	79	February 14, 3031	0:07:22	Partial	62.2S 42.8W	-1.5280	0.0236			
147	80	February 24, 3049	8:48:07	Partial	61.7S 178.7E	-1.5342	0.0104			
