= October 2023 lunar eclipse =

Partial lunar eclipse of 28 October 2023

- Partial eclipse
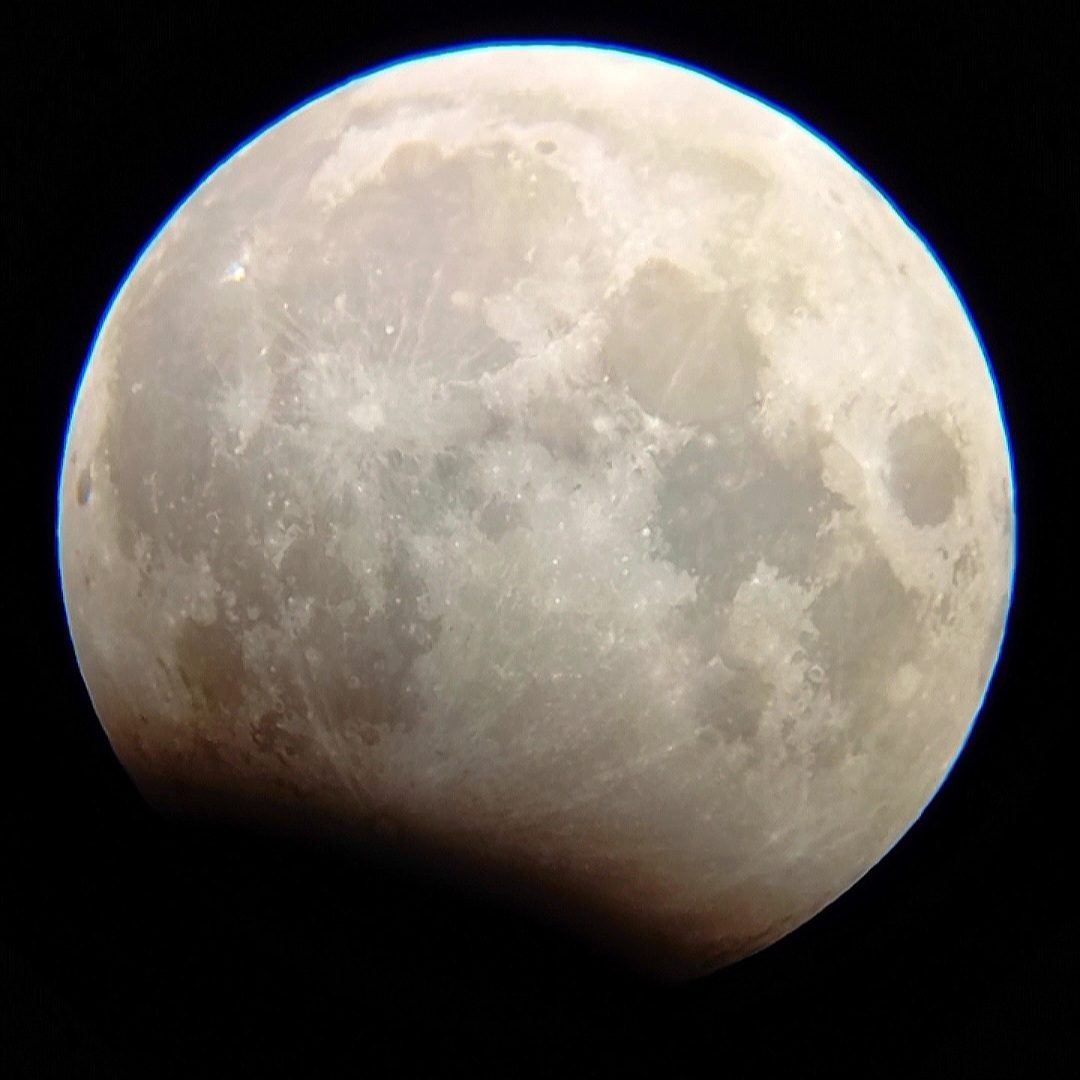
- From Saratov, Russia, 20:12 UTC
- Date: October 28, 2023
- Gamma: 0.9472
- Magnitude: 0.1239
- Saros cycle: 146 (11 of 72)
- Partiality: 78 minutes, 9 seconds
- Penumbral: 265 minutes, 16 seconds
Contacts (UTC)
- P1: 18:01:19
- U1: 19:34:43
- Greatest: 20:14:08
- U4: 20:52:52
- P4: 22:26:35

A partial lunar eclipse occurred at the Moon’s ascending node of orbit on Saturday, October 28, 2023, with an umbral magnitude of 0.1234. A lunar eclipse occurs when the Moon moves into the Earth's shadow, causing the Moon to be darkened. A partial lunar eclipse occurs when one part of the Moon is in the Earth's umbra, while the other part is in the Earth's penumbra. Unlike a solar eclipse, which can only be viewed from a relatively small area of the world, a lunar eclipse may be viewed from anywhere on the night side of Earth. Occurring about 2.7 days after perigee (02:53 UTC, October 26), the Moon's apparent diameter was larger.

== Visibility ==
The eclipse was completely visible over Africa, Europe, and Asia, seen rising over northeastern North America and eastern South America and setting over Australia and the western Pacific Ocean.

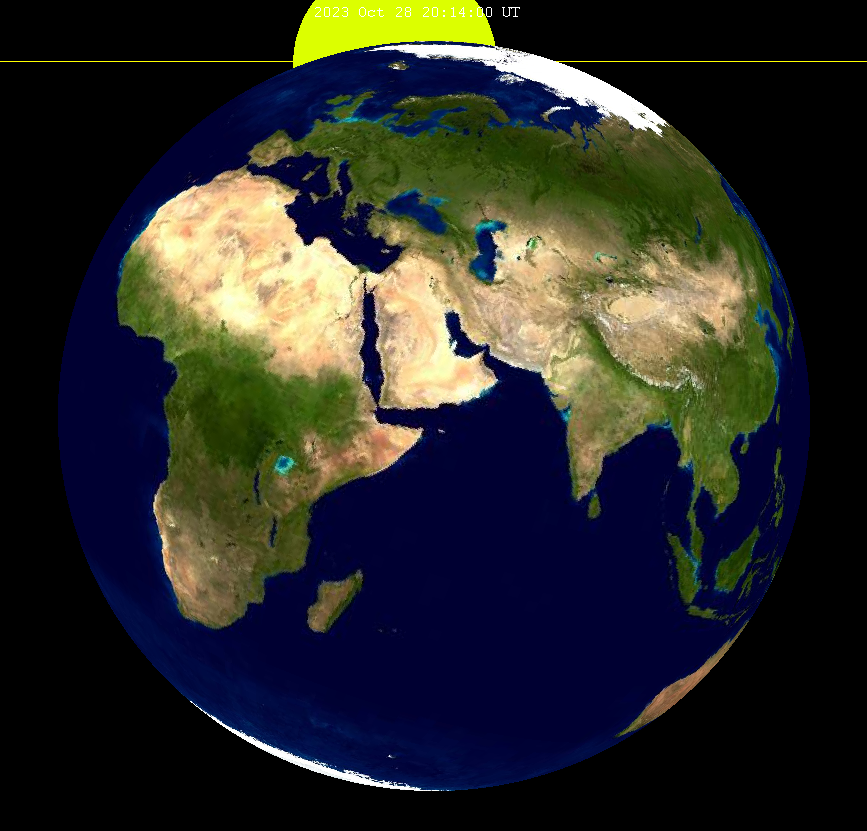
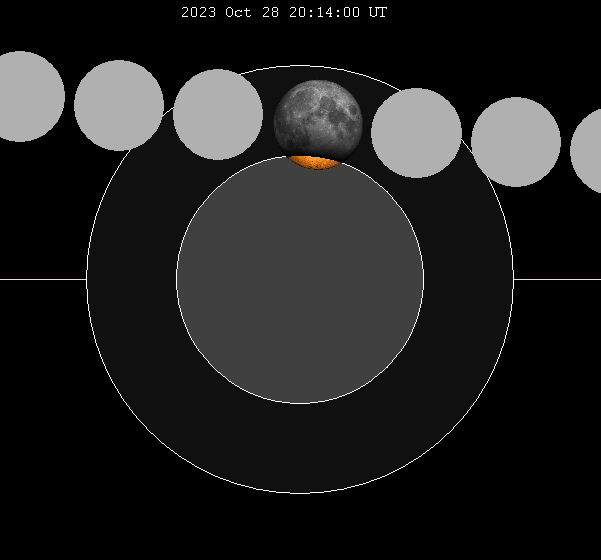
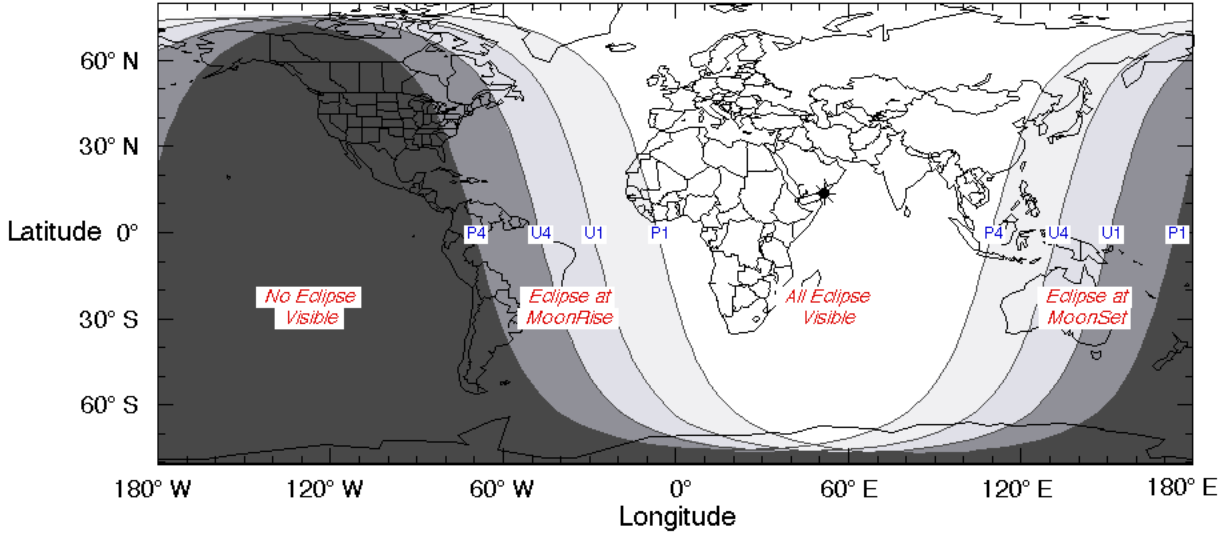
Visibility map

== Gallery ==
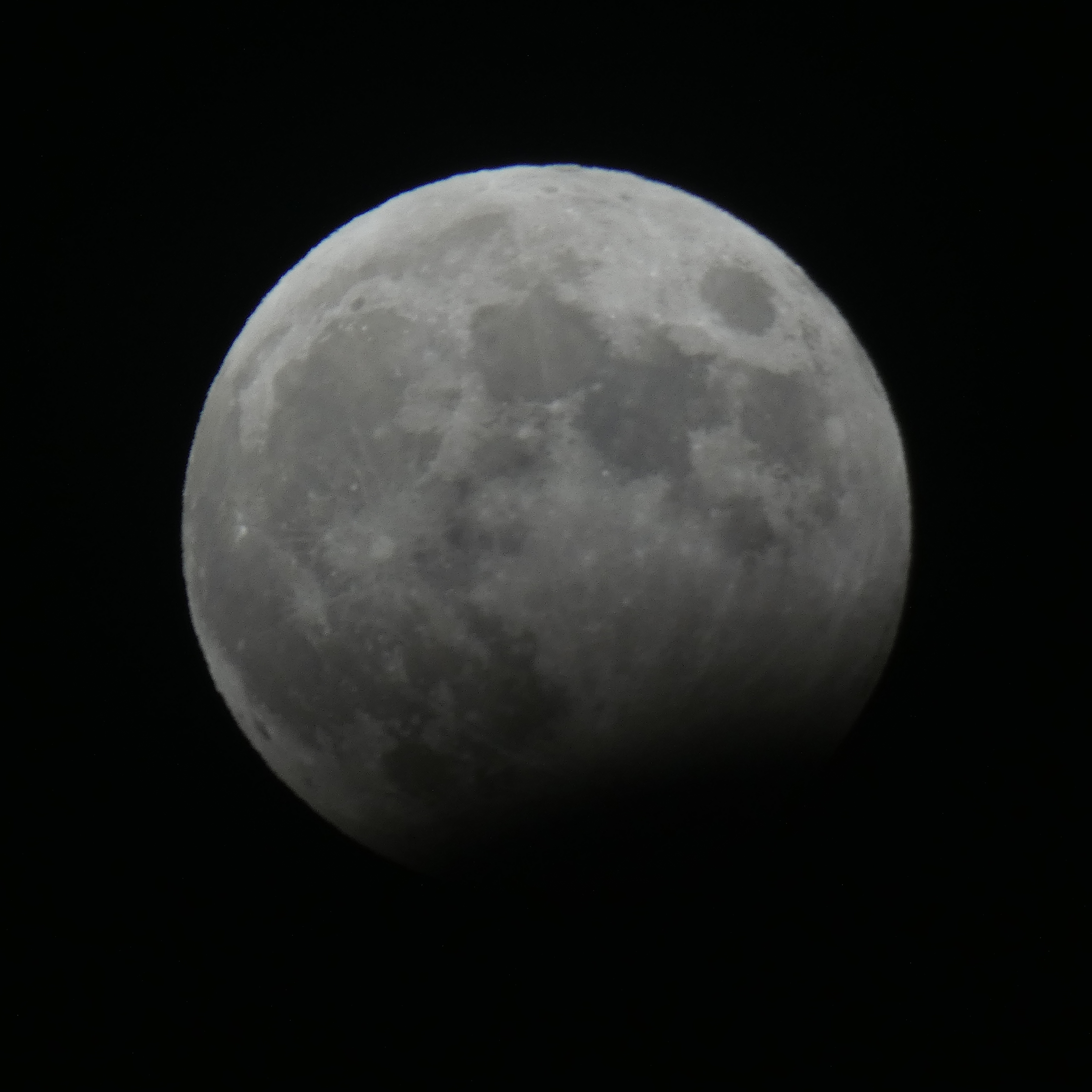
Logroño, Spain, 20:08 UTC

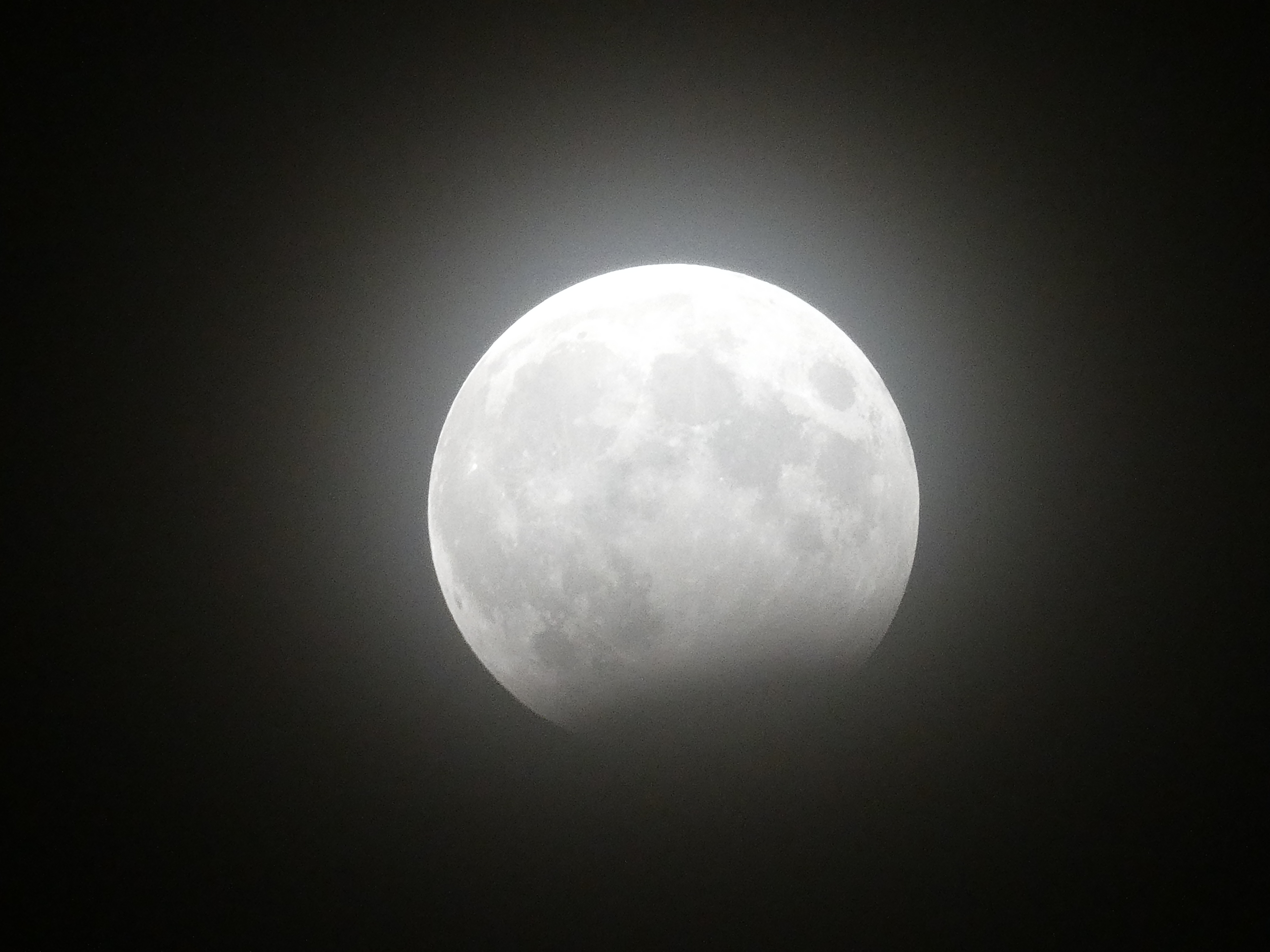
Jihlava, Czech Republic, 20:13 UTC

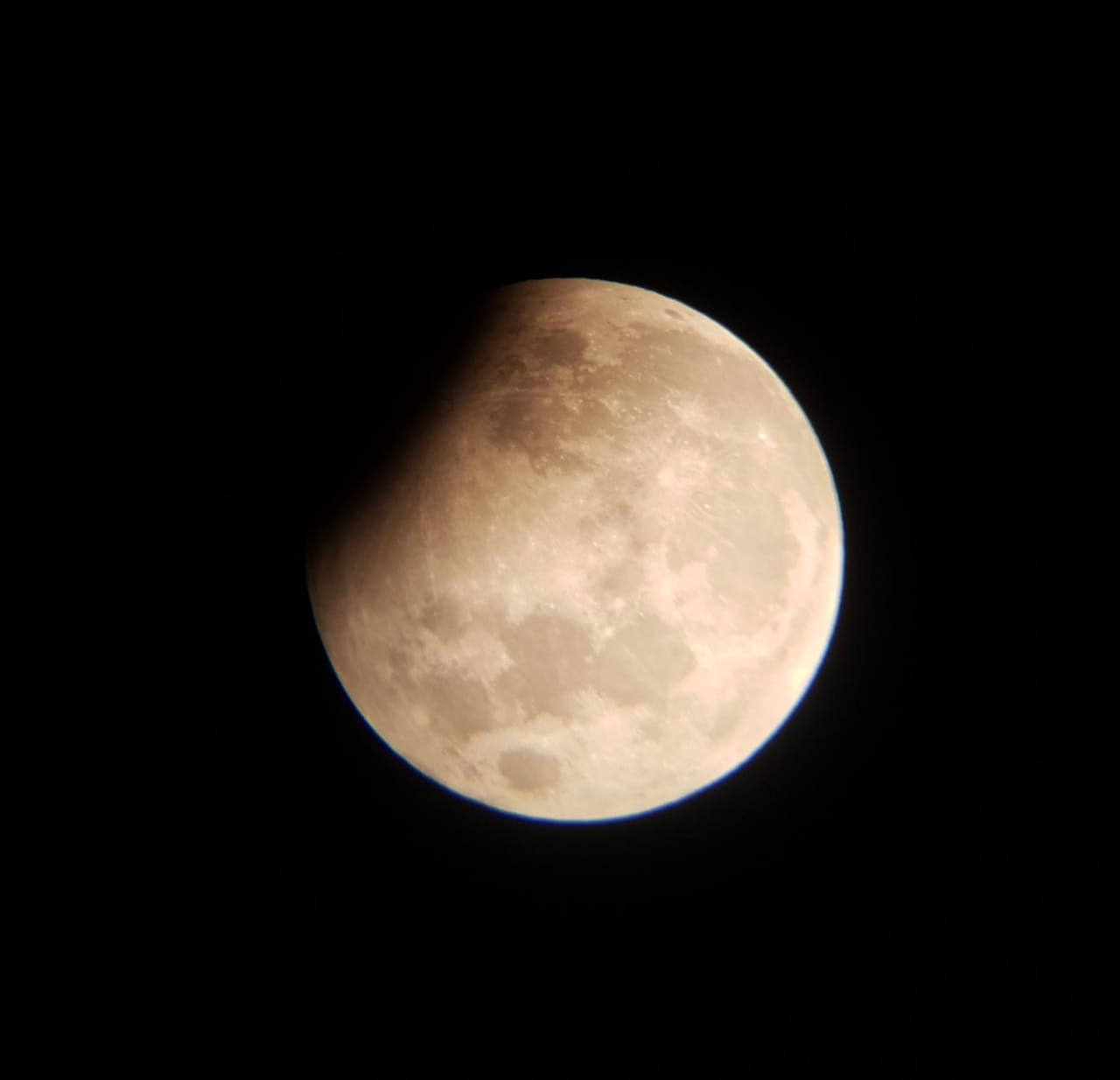
Bandung, Indonesia, 20:14 UTC

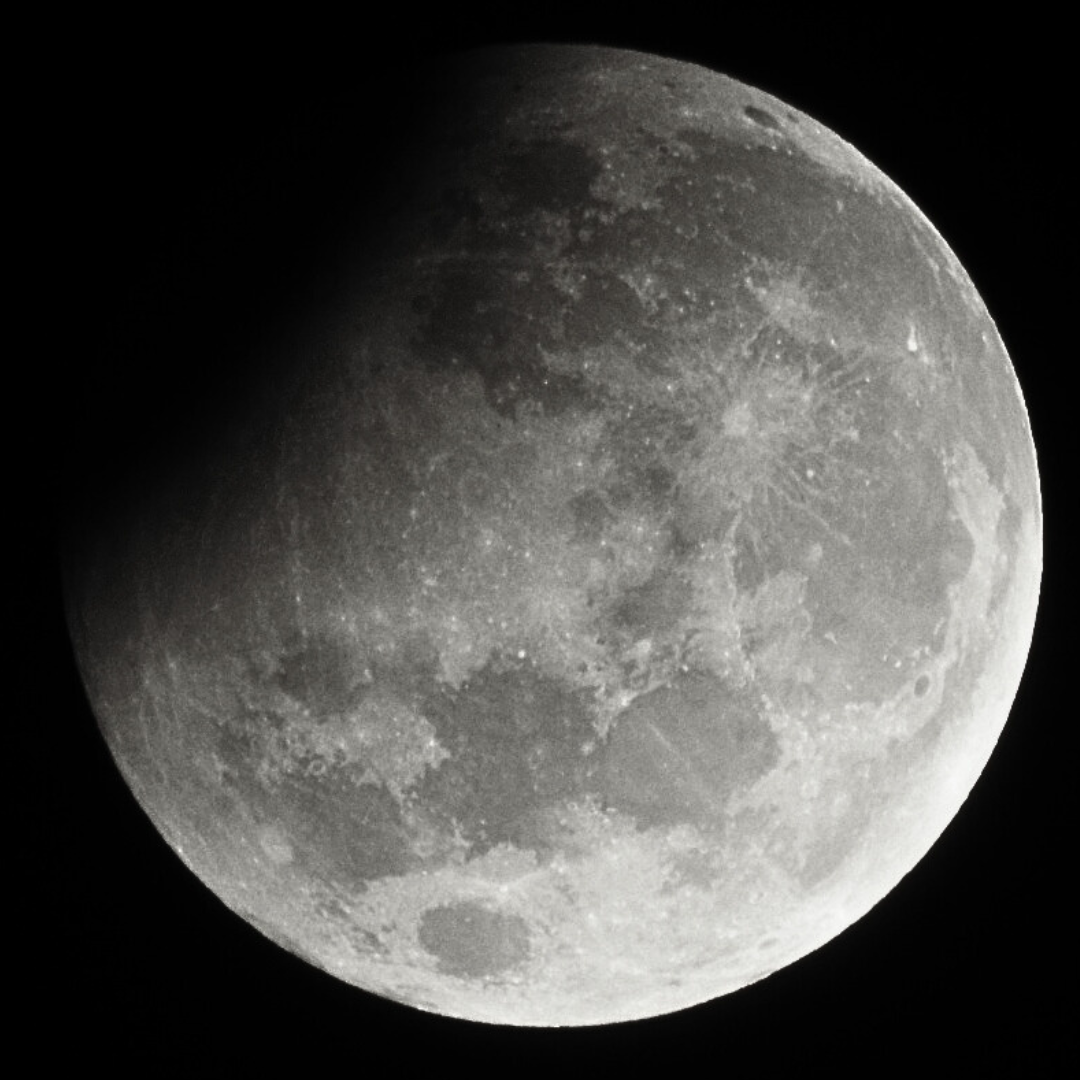
Surabaya, Indonesia, 20:14 UTC

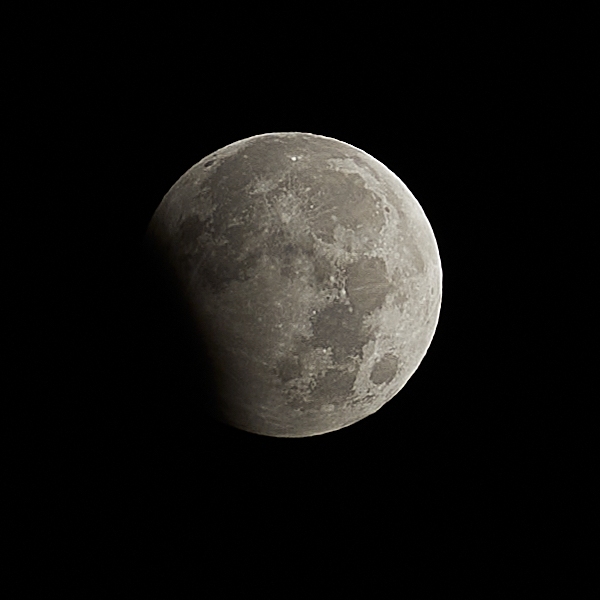
Vladivostok, Russia, 20:15 UTC

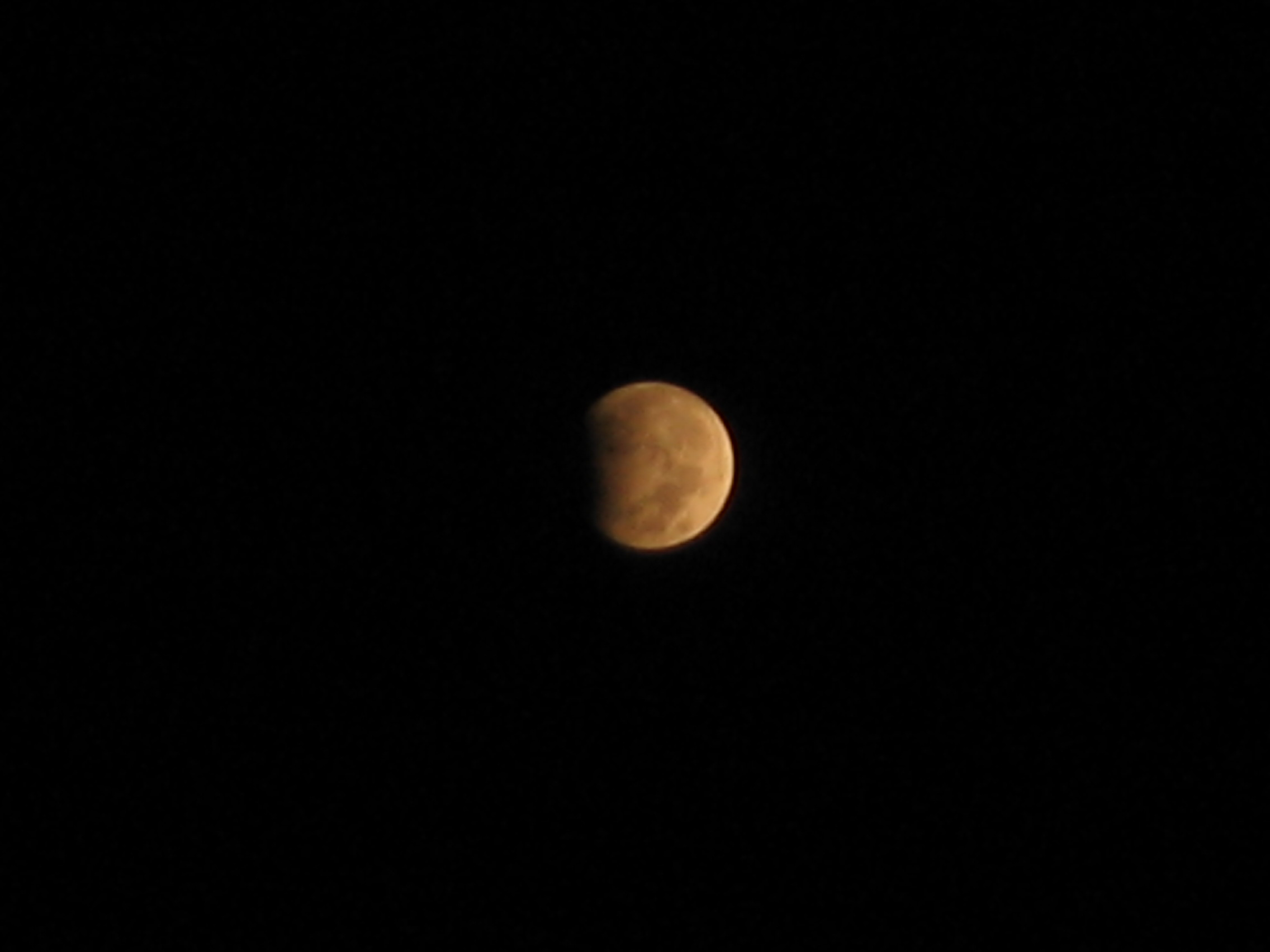
Hefei, China, 20:17 UTC

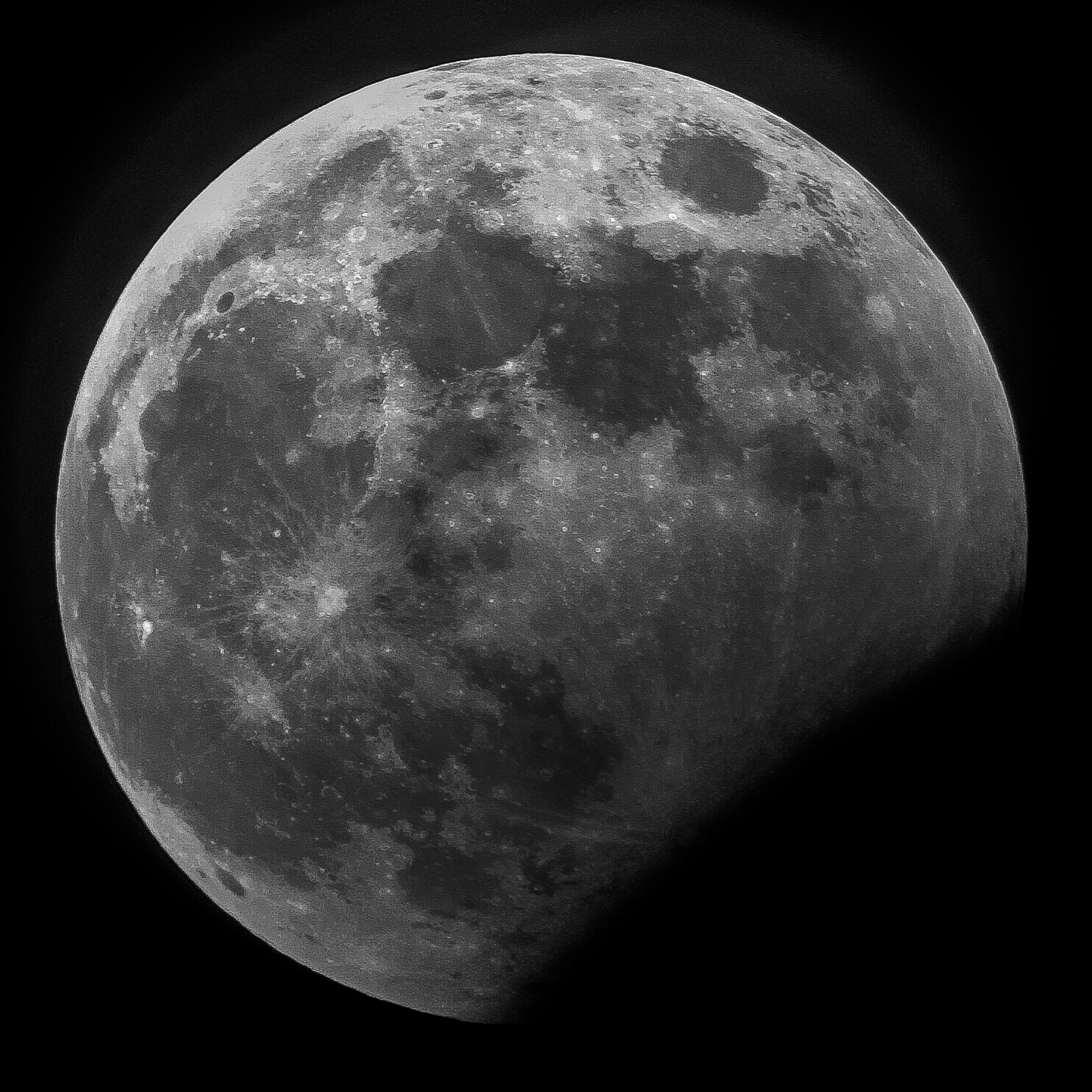
Kumbakonam, India, 20:21 UTC

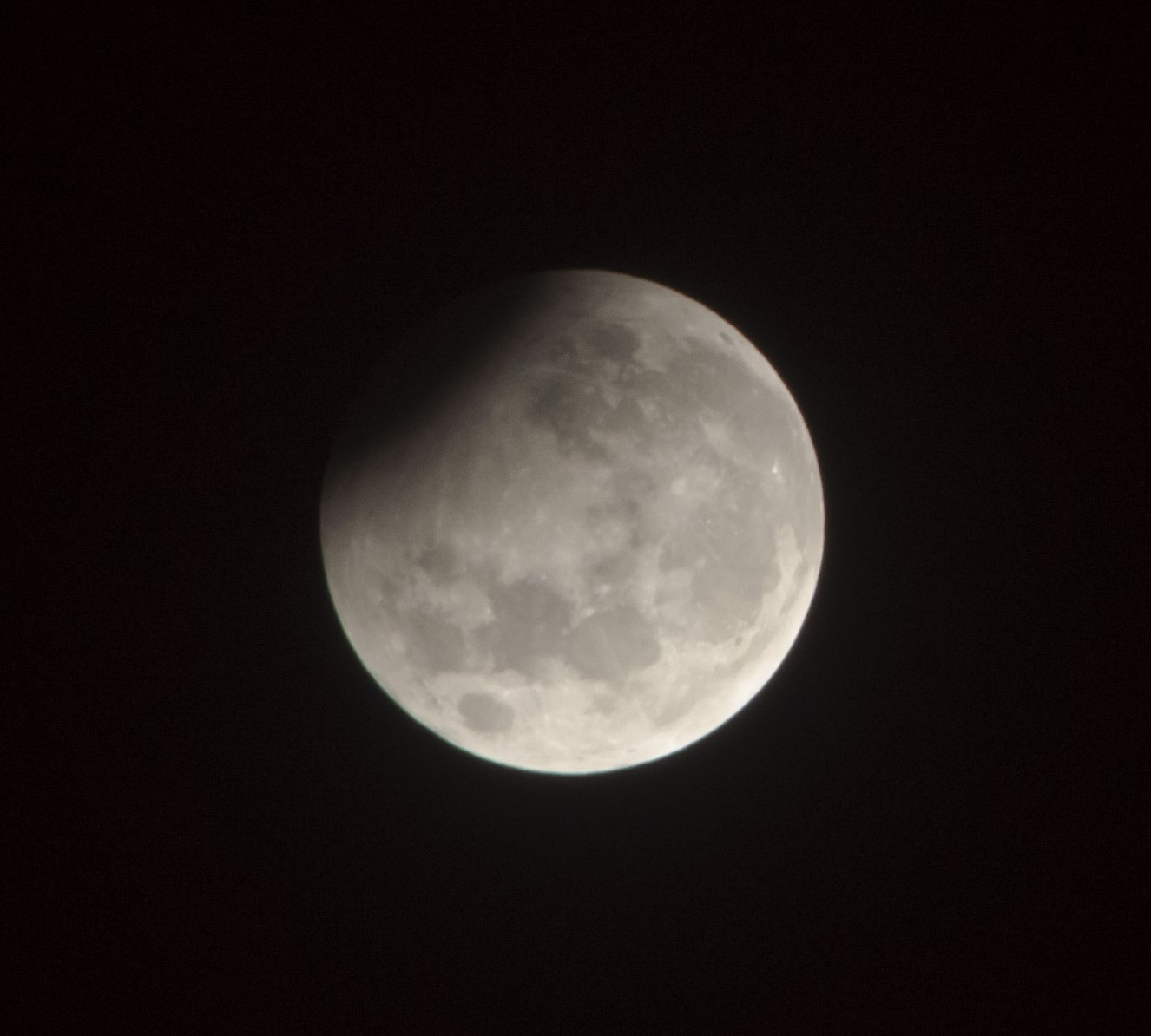
Jakarta, Indonesia, 20:23 UTC

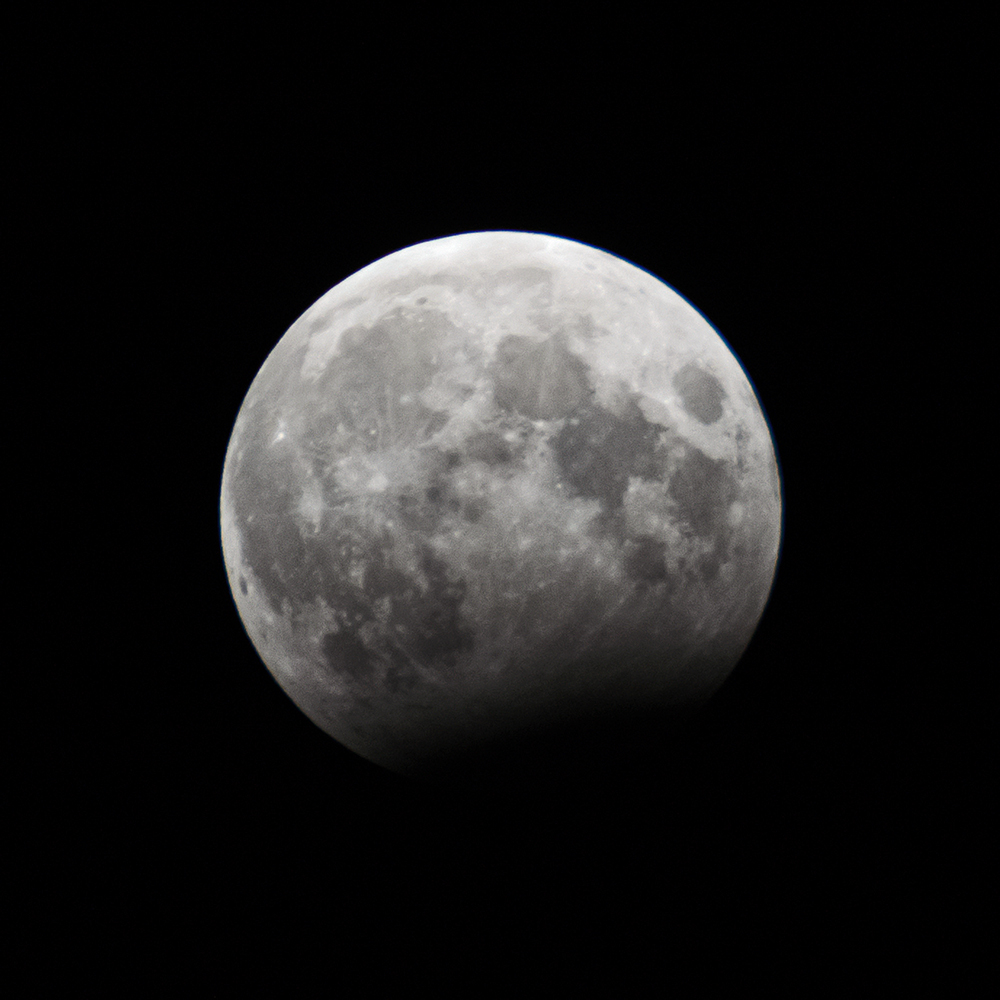
Elbe-Parey, Germany, 20:31 UTC

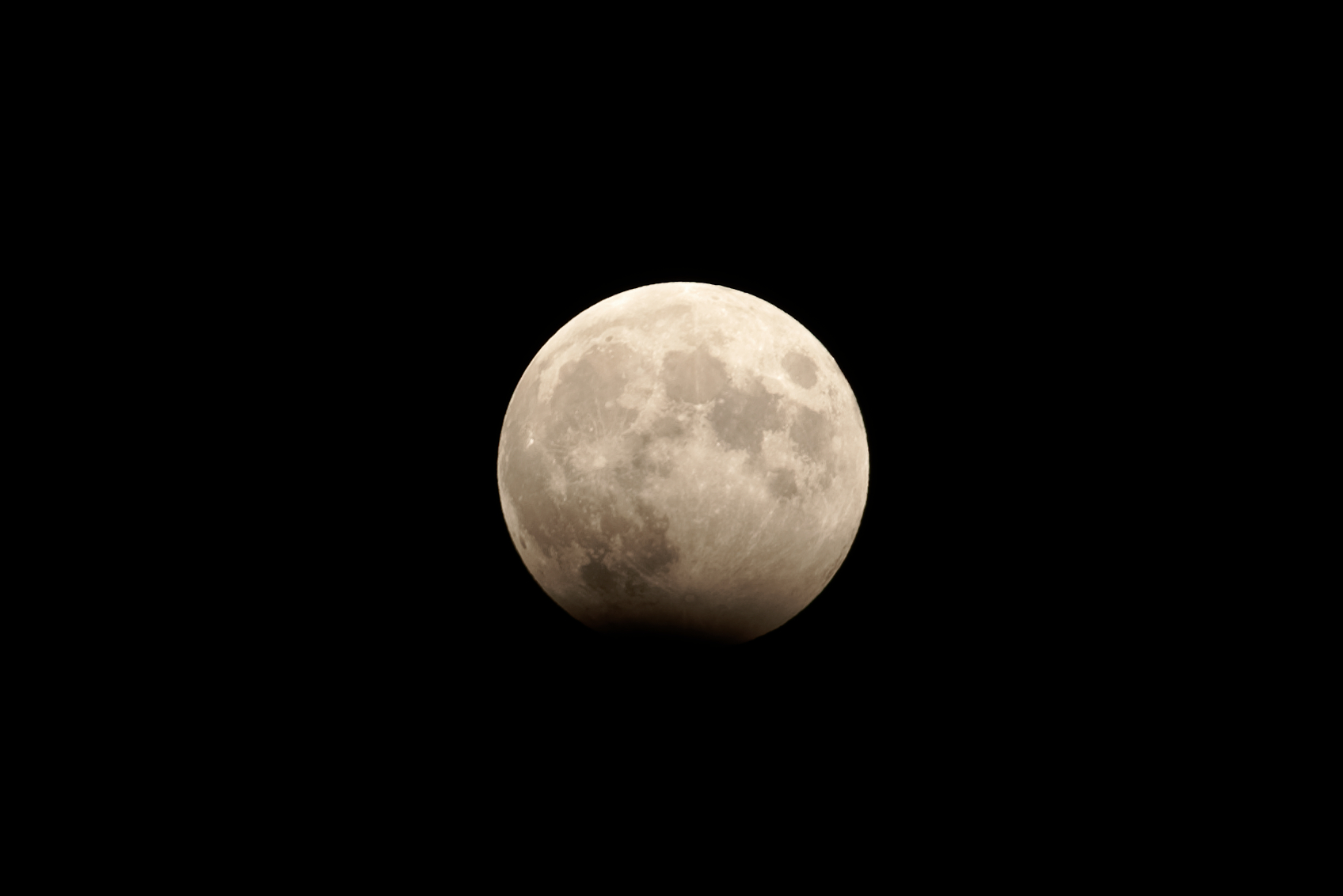
Kraków, Poland, 20:42 UTC

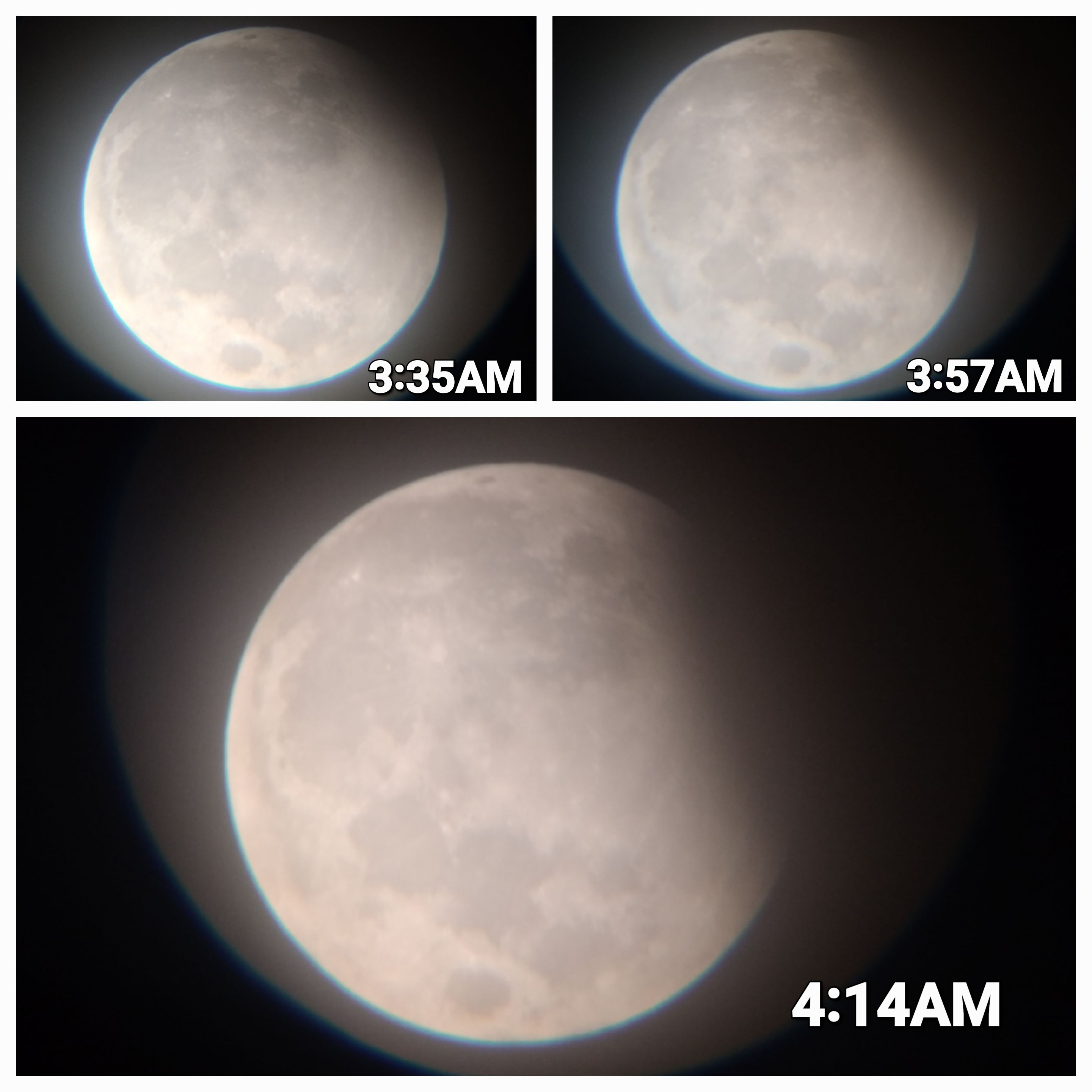
Telescopic view of the eclipse from Kuching, Malaysia

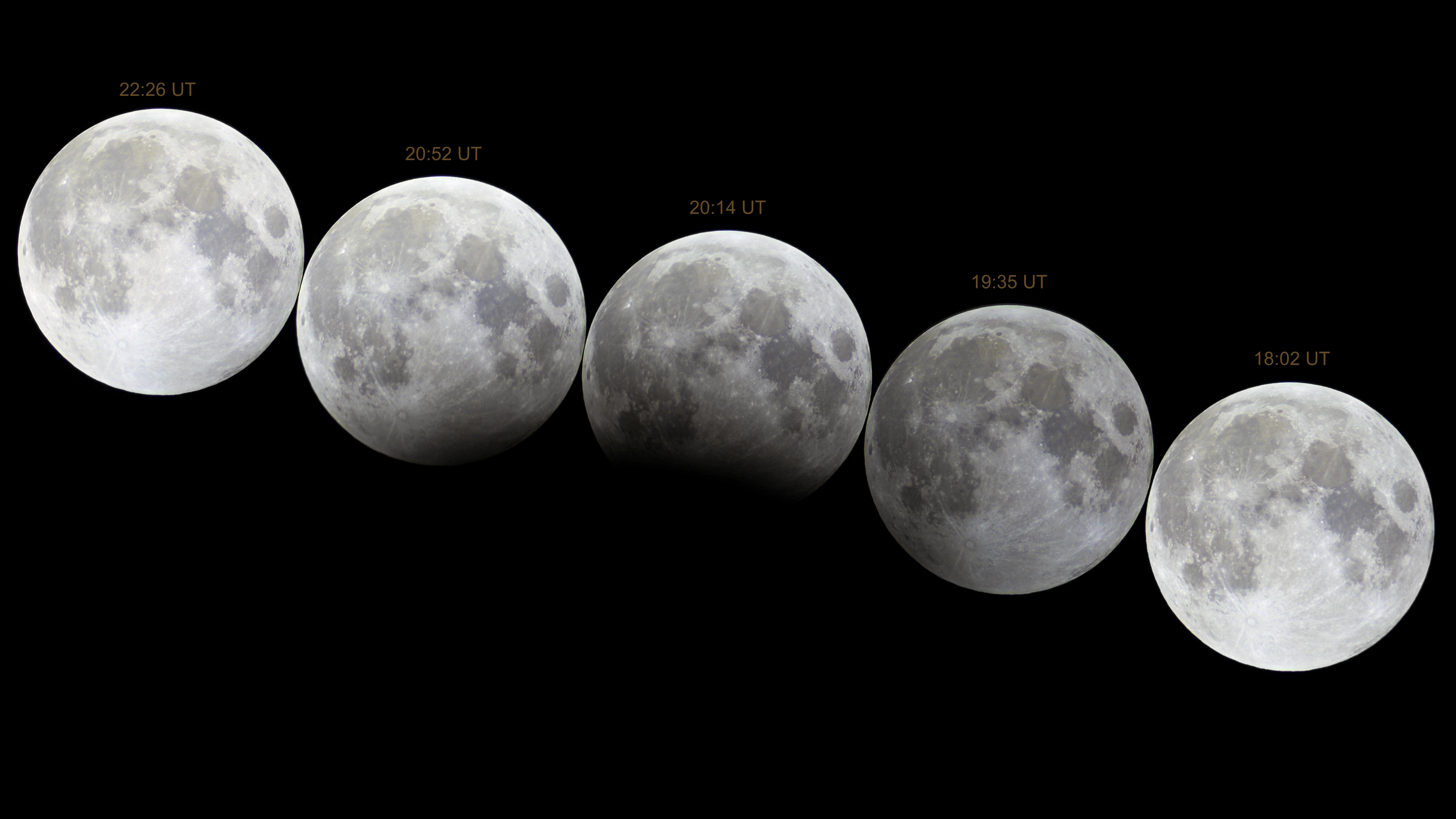
Eclipse progression from Oria, Italy

== Eclipse details ==
Shown below is a table displaying details about this particular lunar eclipse. It describes various parameters pertaining to this eclipse.

October 28, 2023 Lunar Eclipse Parameters
Parameter	Value
Penumbral Magnitude	1.11997
Umbral Magnitude	0.12393
Gamma	0.94716
Sun Right Ascension	14^{h} 11^{m} 25.9^{s}
Sun Declination	−13° 14′ 10.5″
Sun Semi-Diameter	16′ 05.9″
Sun Equatorial Horizontal Parallax	08.9″
Moon Right Ascension	02^{h} 09^{m} 47.6^{s}
Moon Declination	+14° 05′ 01.6″
Moon Semi-Diameter	16′ 09.7″
Moon Equatorial Horizontal Parallax	0° 59′ 18.9″
ΔT	69.2 s

== Eclipse season ==
This eclipse is part of an eclipse season, a period, roughly every six months, when eclipses occur. Only two (or occasionally three) eclipse seasons occur each year, and each season lasts about 35 days and repeats just short of six months (173 days) later; thus two full eclipse seasons always occur each year. Either two or three eclipses happen each eclipse season. In the sequence below, each eclipse is separated by a fortnight.

Eclipse season of October 2023
October 14 Descending node (new moon)	October 28 Ascending node (full moon)
Annular solar eclipse Solar Saros 134	Partial lunar eclipse Lunar Saros 146

== Related eclipses ==
=== Eclipses in 2023 ===
- A hybrid solar eclipse on April 20.
- A penumbral lunar eclipse on May 5.
- An annular solar eclipse on October 14.
- A partial lunar eclipse on October 28.

=== Metonic ===
- Preceded by: Lunar eclipse of January 10, 2020
- Followed by: Lunar eclipse of August 17, 2027

=== Tzolkinex ===
- Preceded by: Lunar eclipse of September 16, 2016
- Followed by: Lunar eclipse of December 9, 2030

=== Half-Saros ===
- Preceded by: Solar eclipse of October 23, 2014
- Followed by: Solar eclipse of November 3, 2032

=== Tritos ===
- Preceded by: Lunar eclipse of November 28, 2012
- Followed by: Lunar eclipse of September 28, 2034

=== Lunar Saros 146 ===
- Preceded by: Lunar eclipse of October 17, 2005
- Followed by: Lunar eclipse of November 8, 2041

=== Inex ===
- Preceded by: Lunar eclipse of November 18, 1994
- Followed by: Lunar eclipse of October 8, 2052

=== Triad ===
- Preceded by: Lunar eclipse of December 28, 1936
- Followed by: Lunar eclipse of August 29, 2110

=== Lunar eclipses of 2020–2023 ===
This eclipse is a member of a semester series. An eclipse in a semester series of lunar eclipses repeats approximately every 177 days and 4 hours (a semester) at alternating nodes of the Moon's orbit.

The penumbral lunar eclipses on January 10, 2020 and July 5, 2020 occur in the previous lunar year eclipse set.

Lunar eclipse series sets from 2020 to 2023
Descending node				Ascending node			
Saros	Date Viewing	Type Chart	Gamma	Saros	Date Viewing	Type Chart	Gamma
111	2020 Jun 05	Penumbral	1.2406	116	2020 Nov 30	Penumbral	−1.1309
121	2021 May 26	Total	0.4774	126	2021 Nov 19	Partial	−0.4553
131	2022 May 16	Total	−0.2532	136	2022 Nov 08	Total	0.2570
141	2023 May 05	Penumbral	−1.0350	146	2023 Oct 28	Partial	0.9472

=== Metonic series ===
The metonic cycle repeats nearly exactly every 19 years and represents a Saros cycle plus one lunar year. Because it occurs on the same calendar date, the Earth's shadow will in nearly the same location relative to the background stars.

Metonic events: May 4 and October 28
Descending node	Ascending node
1. 1966 May 4 - Penumbral (111); 2. 1985 May 4 - Total (121); 3. 2004 May 4 - Total (131); 4. 2023 May 5 - Penumbral (141)	1. 1966 Oct 29 - Penumbral (116); 2. 1985 Oct 28 - Total (126); 3. 2004 Oct 28 - Total (136); 4. 2023 Oct 28 - Partial (146); 5. 2042 Oct 28 - Penumbral (156)

=== Saros 146 ===
This eclipse is a part of Saros series 146, repeating every 18 years, 11 days, and containing 72 events. The series started with a penumbral lunar eclipse on July 11, 1843. It contains partial eclipses from October 17, 2005 through May 14, 2348; total eclipses from May 25, 2366 through November 16, 2654; and a second set of partial eclipses from November 27, 2672 through June 12, 2997. The series ends at member 72 as a penumbral eclipse on August 29, 3123.

The longest duration of totality will be produced by member 37 at 99 minutes, 22 seconds on August 8, 2492. All eclipses in this series occur at the Moon’s ascending node of orbit.

Greatest	First			
The greatest eclipse of the series will occur on 2492 Aug 08, lasting 99 minutes, 22 seconds.	Penumbral	Partial	Total	Central
The greatest eclipse of the series will occur on 2492 Aug 08, lasting 99 minutes, 22 seconds.	1843 Jul 11	2005 Oct 17	2366 May 25	2438 Jul 07
The greatest eclipse of the series will occur on 2492 Aug 08, lasting 99 minutes, 22 seconds.	Last			
The greatest eclipse of the series will occur on 2492 Aug 08, lasting 99 minutes, 22 seconds.	Central	Total	Partial	Penumbral
The greatest eclipse of the series will occur on 2492 Aug 08, lasting 99 minutes, 22 seconds.	2546 Sep 11	2654 Nov 16	2997 Jun 12	3123 Aug 29

Eclipses are tabulated in three columns; every third eclipse in the same column is one exeligmos apart, so they all cast shadows over approximately the same parts of the Earth.

Series members 1–20 occur between 1843 and 2200:
1	2	3
1843 Jul 11	1861 Jul 21	1879 Aug 02
4	5	6
1897 Aug 12	1915 Aug 24	1933 Sep 04
7	8	9
1951 Sep 15	1969 Sep 25	1987 Oct 07
10	11	12
2005 Oct 17	2023 Oct 28	2041 Nov 08
13	14	15
2059 Nov 19	2077 Nov 29	2095 Dec 11
16	17	18
2113 Dec 22	2132 Jan 02	2150 Jan 13
19	20	
2168 Jan 24	2186 Feb 04	

=== Tritos series ===
This eclipse is a part of a tritos cycle, repeating at alternating nodes every 135 synodic months (≈ 3986.63 days, or 11 years minus 1 month). Their appearance and longitude are irregular due to a lack of synchronization with the anomalistic month (period of perigee), but groupings of 3 tritos cycles (≈ 33 years minus 3 months) come close (≈ 434.044 anomalistic months), so eclipses are similar in these groupings.

Series members between 1801 and 2132
1805 Jul 11 (Saros 126)	1816 Jun 10 (Saros 127)	1827 May 11 (Saros 128)	1838 Apr 10 (Saros 129)	1849 Mar 09 (Saros 130)
1860 Feb 07 (Saros 131)	1871 Jan 06 (Saros 132)	1881 Dec 05 (Saros 133)	1892 Nov 04 (Saros 134)	1903 Oct 06 (Saros 135)
1914 Sep 04 (Saros 136)	1925 Aug 04 (Saros 137)	1936 Jul 04 (Saros 138)	1947 Jun 03 (Saros 139)	1958 May 03 (Saros 140)
1969 Apr 02 (Saros 141)	1980 Mar 01 (Saros 142)	1991 Jan 30 (Saros 143)	2001 Dec 30 (Saros 144)	2012 Nov 28 (Saros 145)
2023 Oct 28 (Saros 146)	2034 Sep 28 (Saros 147)	2045 Aug 27 (Saros 148)	2056 Jul 26 (Saros 149)	2067 Jun 27 (Saros 150)
2132 Dec 22 (Saros 156)

=== Inex series ===
This eclipse is a part of the long period inex cycle, repeating at alternating nodes, every 358 synodic months (≈ 10,571.95 days, or 29 years minus 20 days). Their appearance and longitude are irregular due to a lack of synchronization with the anomalistic month (period of perigee). However, groupings of 3 inex cycles (≈ 87 years minus 2 months) comes close (≈ 1,151.02 anomalistic months), so eclipses are similar in these groupings.

Series members between 1801 and 2200
1821 Mar 18 (Saros 139)	1850 Feb 26 (Saros 140)	1879 Feb 07 (Saros 141)
1908 Jan 18 (Saros 142)	1936 Dec 28 (Saros 143)	1965 Dec 08 (Saros 144)
1994 Nov 18 (Saros 145)	2023 Oct 28 (Saros 146)	2052 Oct 08 (Saros 147)
2081 Sep 18 (Saros 148)	2110 Aug 29 (Saros 149)	2139 Aug 10 (Saros 150)
2168 Jul 20 (Saros 151)	2197 Jun 29 (Saros 152)	

=== Half-Saros cycle ===
A lunar eclipse will be preceded and followed by solar eclipses by 9 years and 5.5 days (a half saros). This lunar eclipse is related to two partial solar eclipses of Solar Saros 153.

October 23, 2014	November 3, 2032

== See also ==
- List of lunar eclipses and List of 21st-century lunar eclipses
