= May 2023 lunar eclipse =

Penumbral eclipse on 5 May

- Penumbral eclipse
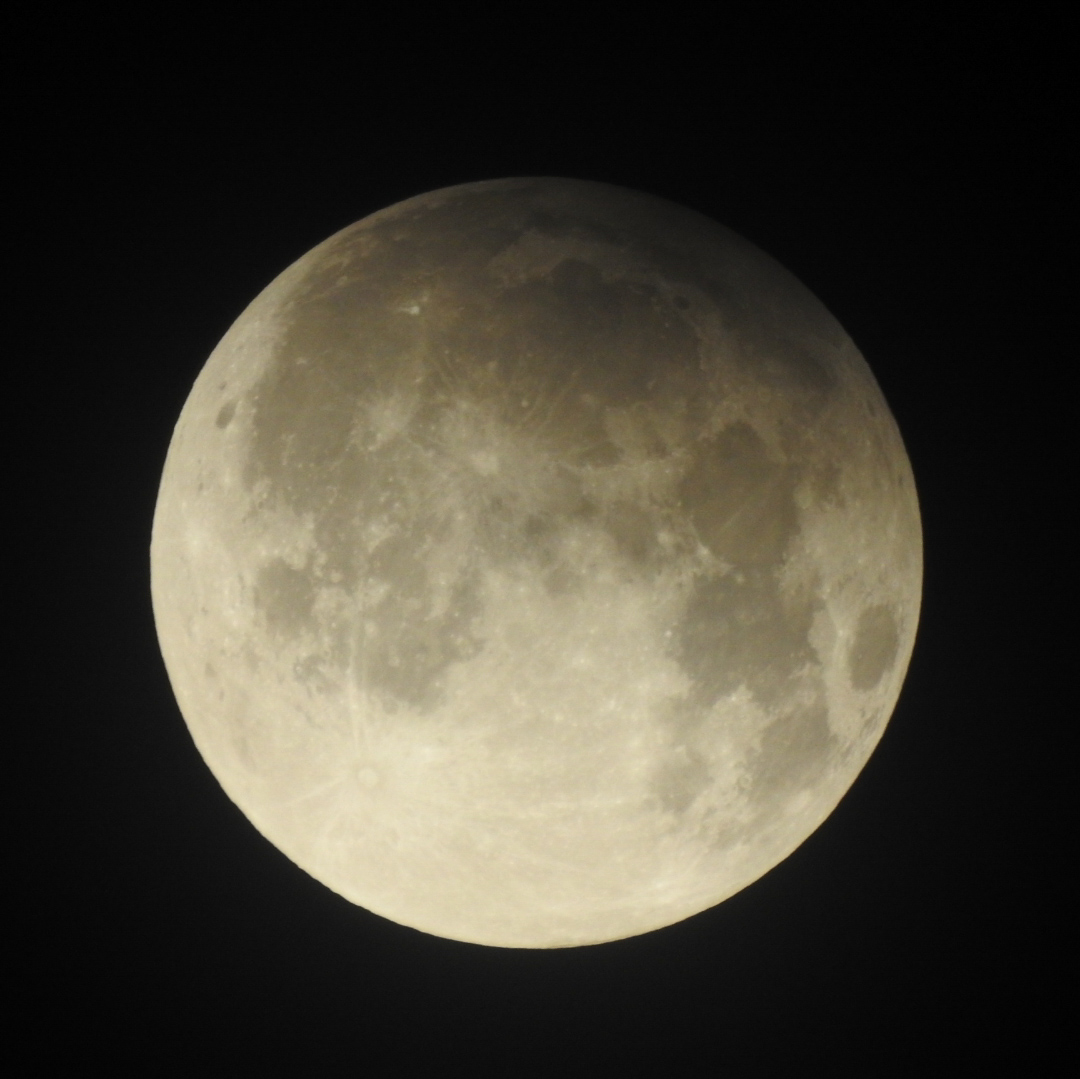
- From Surabaya, Indonesia, 17:22 UTC
- Date: May 5, 2023
- Gamma: −1.0350
- Magnitude: −0.0438
- Saros cycle: 141 (24 of 72)
- Penumbral: 258 minutes, 16 seconds
Contacts (UTC)
- P1: 15:13:41
- Greatest: 17:22:55
- P4: 19:31:56

A penumbral lunar eclipse occurred at the Moon's descending node of orbit on Friday, May 5, 2023, with an umbral magnitude of −0.0438. A lunar eclipse occurs when the Moon moves into the Earth's shadow, causing the Moon to be darkened. A penumbral lunar eclipse occurs when part or all of the Moon's near side passes into the Earth's penumbra. Unlike a solar eclipse, which can only be viewed from a relatively small area of the world, a lunar eclipse may be viewed from anywhere on the night side of Earth. Occurring about 5.5 days before perigee (04:57 UTC, May 11), the Moon's apparent diameter was larger than average.

This was the deepest penumbral eclipse since February 2017 and until August 2053.

== Visibility ==
The eclipse was completely visible over Asia, Australia, and Antarctica, seen rising over Africa and Europe and setting over the central Pacific Ocean.

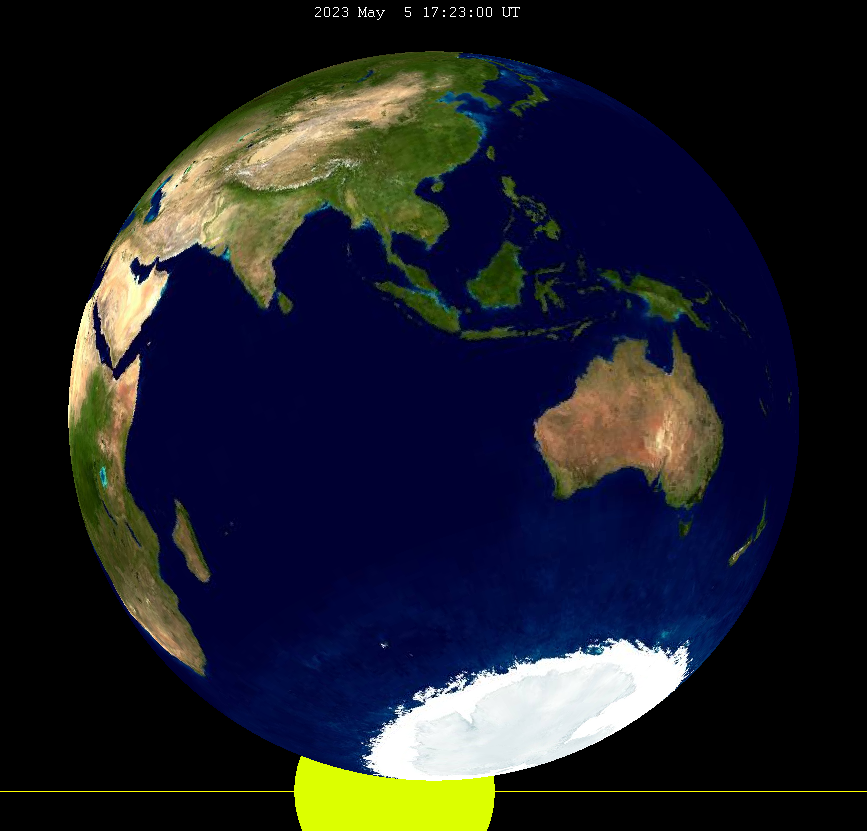
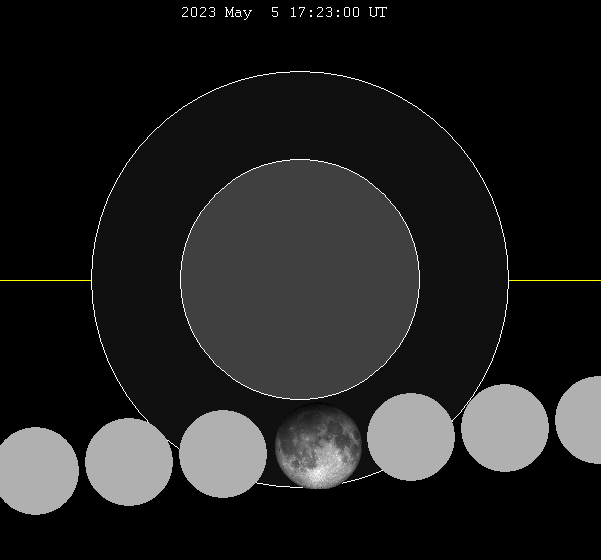
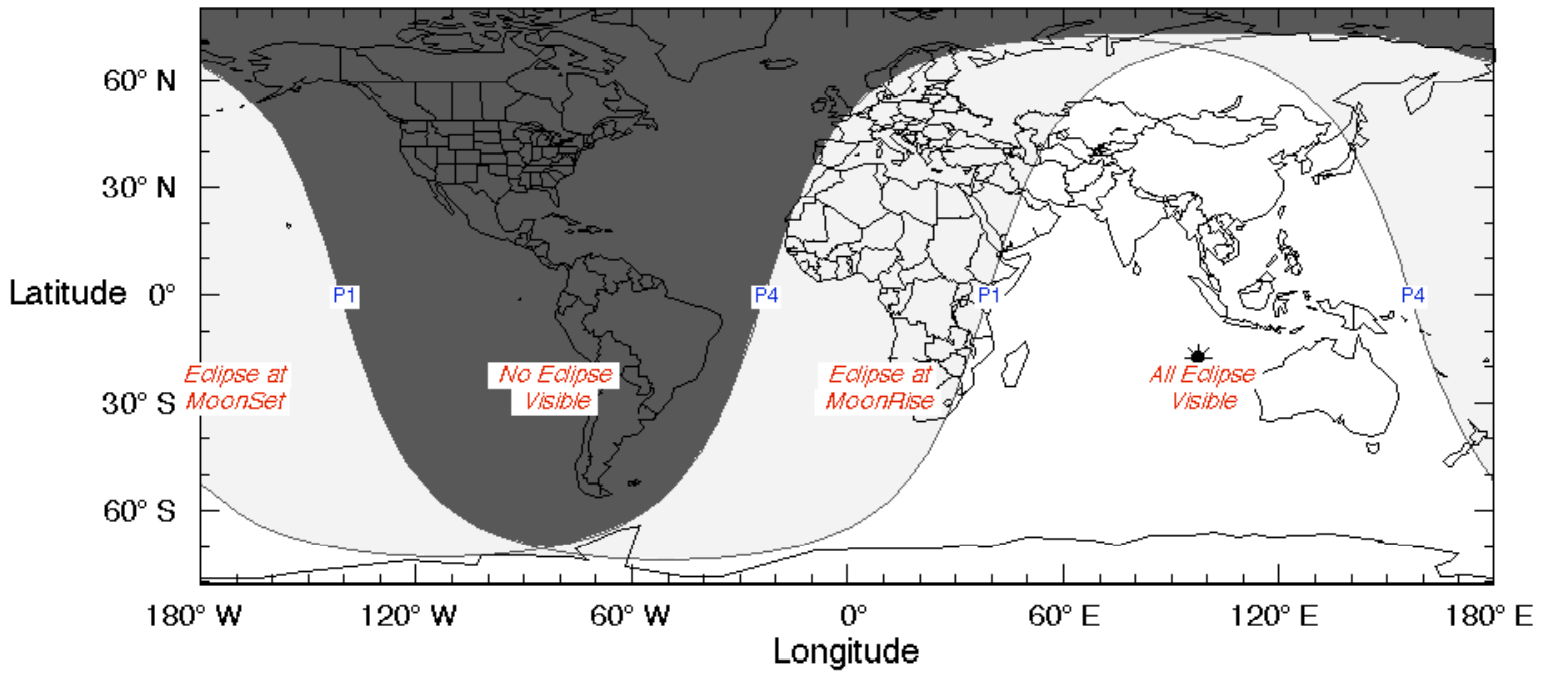
Visibility map

== Gallery ==
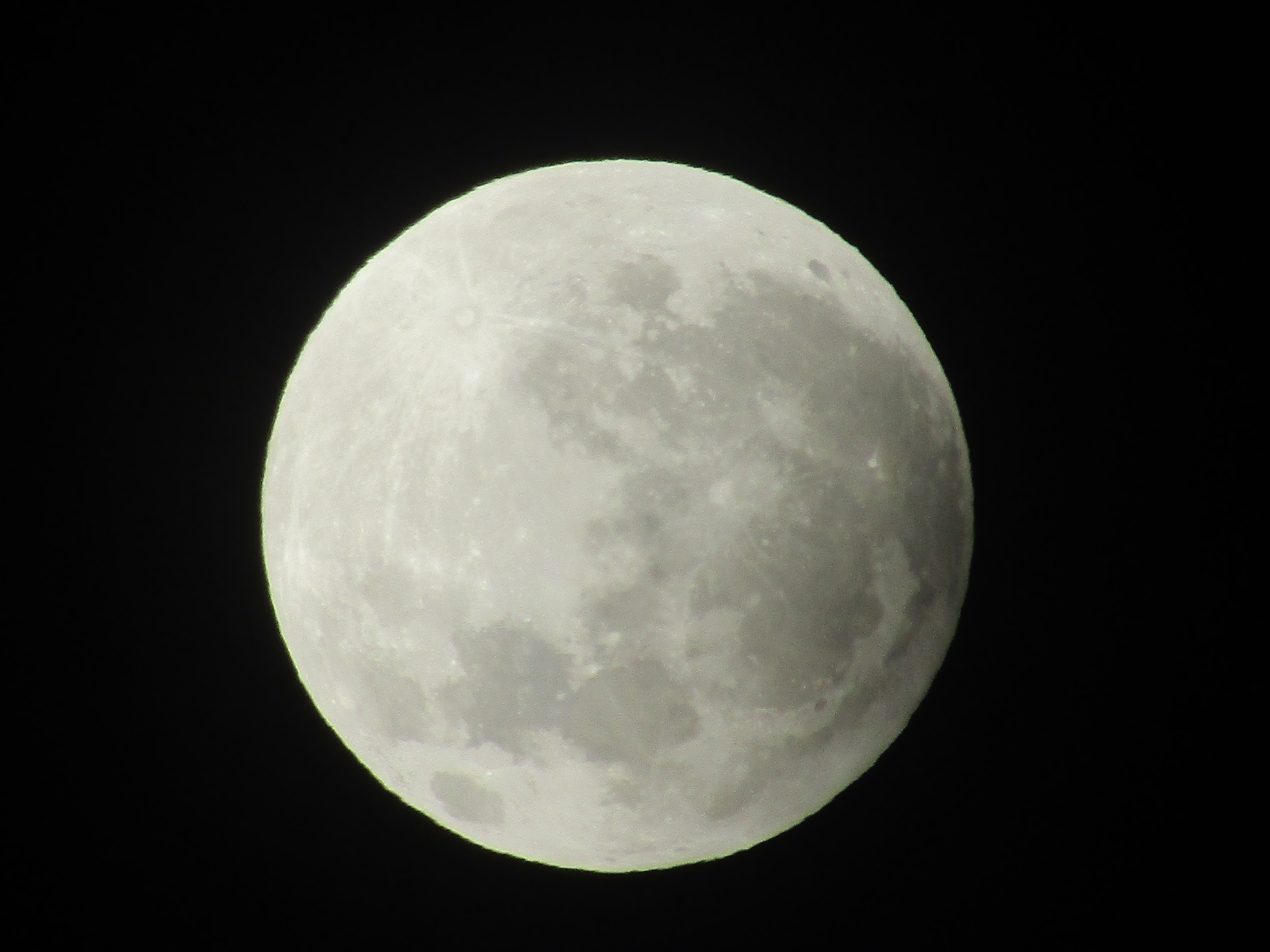
Perth, Australia, 16:48 UTC

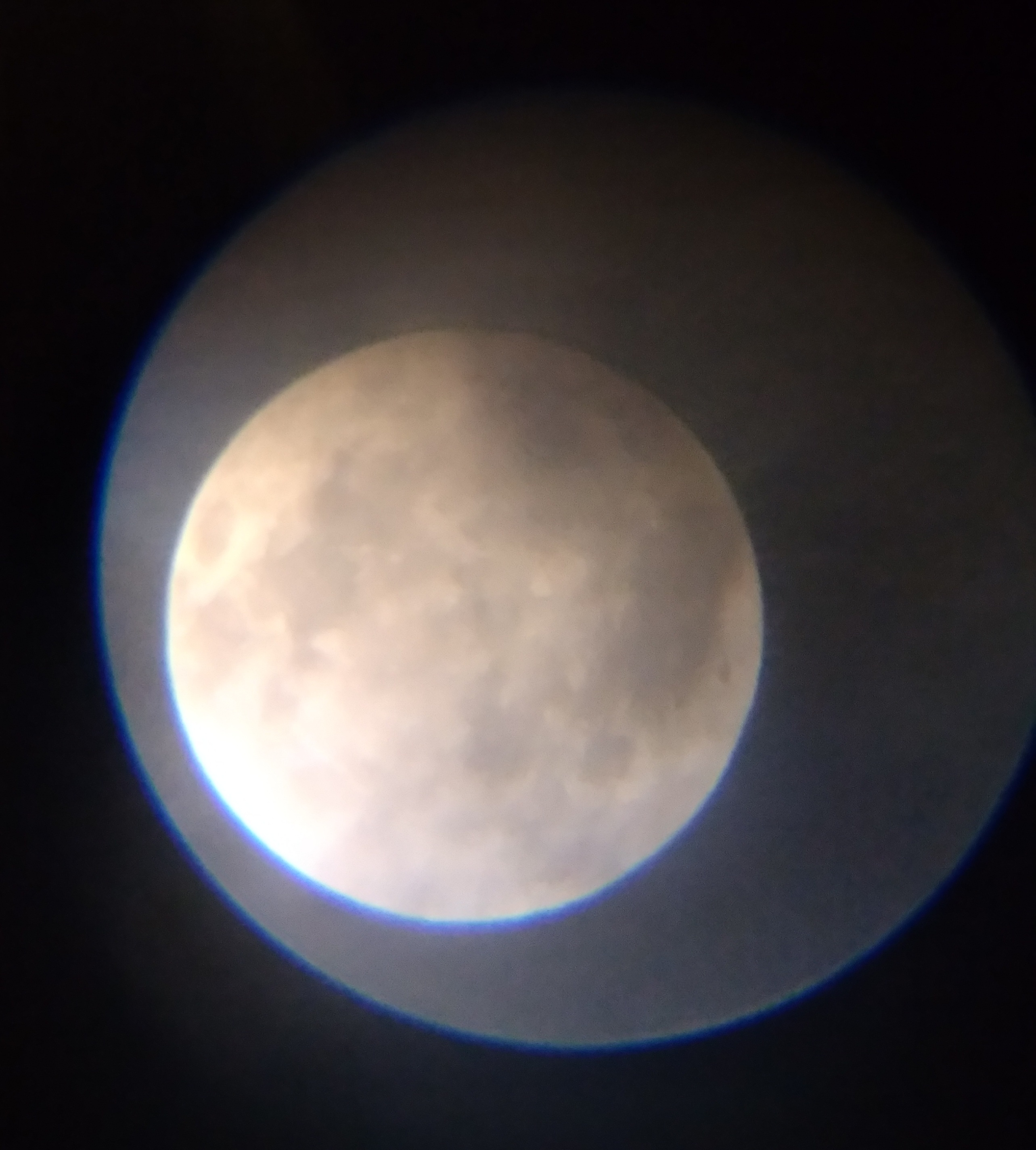
Astronomical telescope view from Kuching, Malaysia, 17:26 UTC

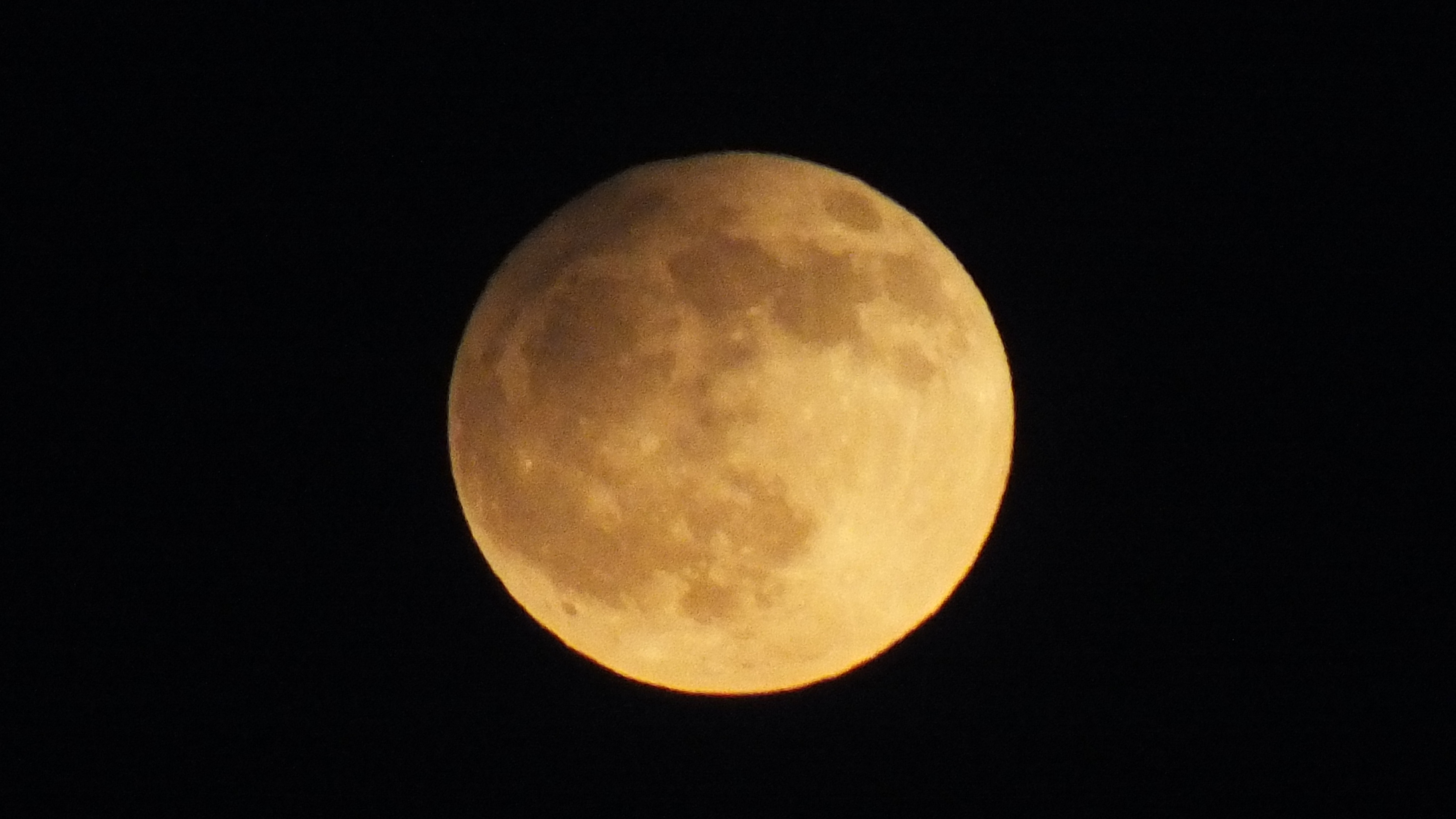
Moscow, Russia, 17:49 UTC

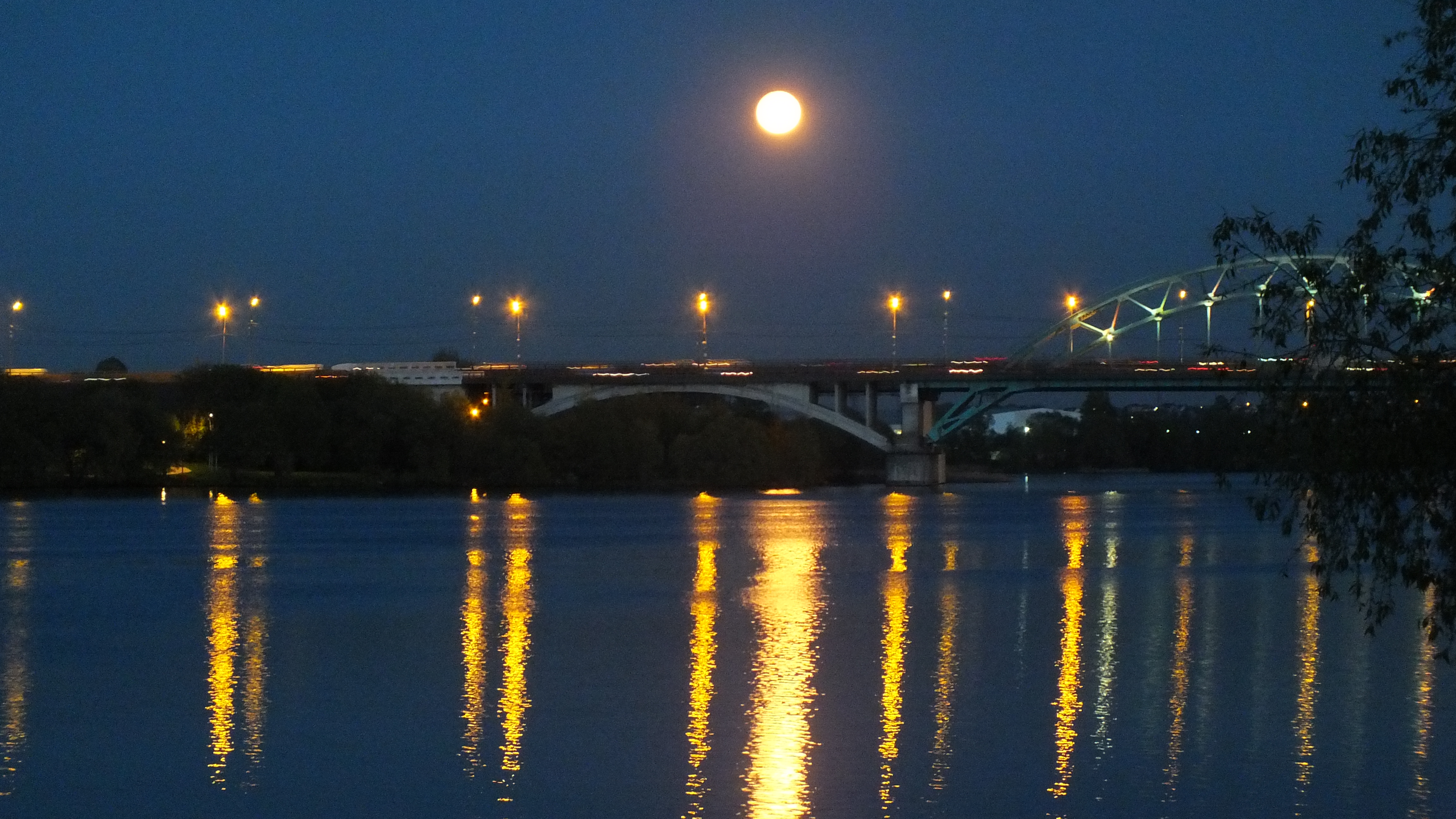
Moonrise and moon track during eclipse in Moscow, 17:56 UTC

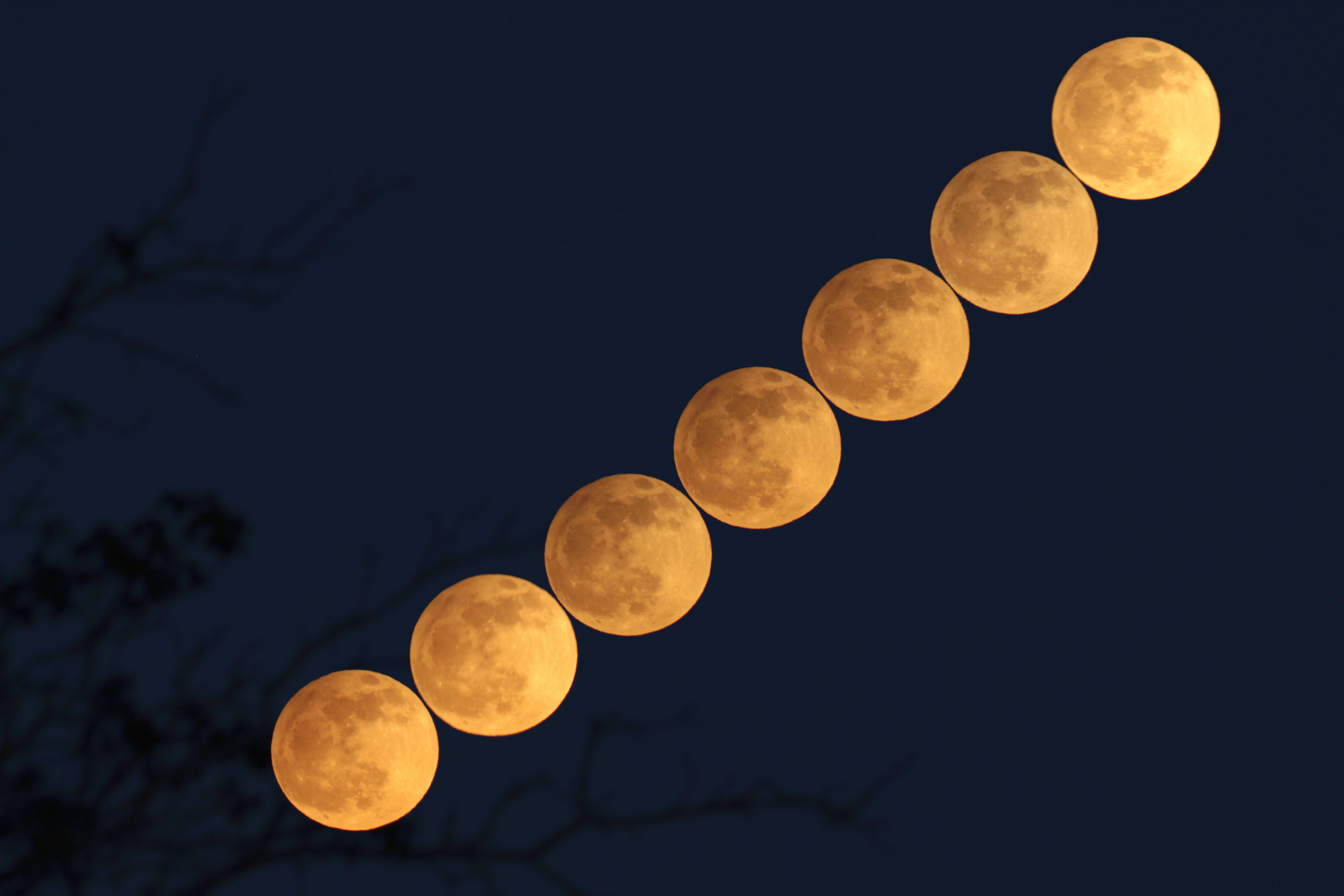
Eclipse progression image from Oria, Italy

== Eclipse details ==
Shown below is a table displaying details about this particular solar eclipse. It describes various parameters pertaining to this eclipse.

May 5, 2023 Lunar Eclipse Parameters
Parameter	Value
Penumbral Magnitude	0.96551
Umbral Magnitude	−0.04378
Gamma	−1.03495
Sun Right Ascension	02^{h} 49^{m} 59.7^{s}
Sun Declination	+16° 19′ 27.9″
Sun Semi-Diameter	15′ 51.6″
Sun Equatorial Horizontal Parallax	08.7″
Moon Right Ascension	14^{h} 48^{m} 23.5^{s}
Moon Declination	−17° 14′ 31.7″
Moon Semi-Diameter	15′ 42.8″
Moon Equatorial Horizontal Parallax	0° 57′ 40.1″
ΔT	69.2 s

== Eclipse season ==
This eclipse is part of an eclipse season, a period, roughly every six months, when eclipses occur. Only two (or occasionally three) eclipse seasons occur each year, and each season lasts about 35 days and repeats just short of six months (173 days) later; thus two full eclipse seasons always occur each year. Either two or three eclipses happen each eclipse season. In the sequence below, each eclipse is separated by a fortnight.

Eclipse season of April–May 2023
April 20 Ascending node (new moon)	May 5 Descending node (full moon)
Hybrid solar eclipse Solar Saros 129	Penumbral lunar eclipse Lunar Saros 141

== Related eclipses ==
=== Eclipses in 2023 ===
- A hybrid solar eclipse on April 20.
- A penumbral lunar eclipse on May 5.
- An annular solar eclipse on October 14.
- A partial lunar eclipse on October 28.

=== Metonic ===
- Preceded by: Lunar eclipse of July 16, 2019
- Followed by: Lunar eclipse of February 20, 2027

=== Tzolkinex ===
- Preceded by: Lunar eclipse of March 23, 2016
- Followed by: Lunar eclipse of June 15, 2030

=== Half-Saros ===
- Preceded by: Solar eclipse of April 29, 2014
- Followed by: Solar eclipse of May 9, 2032

=== Tritos ===
- Preceded by: Lunar eclipse of June 4, 2012
- Followed by: Lunar eclipse of April 3, 2034

=== Lunar Saros 141 ===
- Preceded by: Lunar eclipse of April 24, 2005
- Followed by: Lunar eclipse of May 16, 2041

=== Inex ===
- Preceded by: Lunar eclipse of May 25, 1994
- Followed by: Lunar eclipse of April 14, 2052

=== Triad ===
- Preceded by: Lunar eclipse of July 4, 1936
- Followed by: Lunar eclipse of March 6, 2110

=== Lunar eclipses of 2020–2023 ===
This eclipse is a member of a semester series. An eclipse in a semester series of lunar eclipses repeats approximately every 177 days and 4 hours (a semester) at alternating nodes of the Moon's orbit.

The penumbral lunar eclipses on January 10, 2020 and July 5, 2020 occur in the previous lunar year eclipse set.

Lunar eclipse series sets from 2020 to 2023
Descending node				Ascending node			
Saros	Date Viewing	Type Chart	Gamma	Saros	Date Viewing	Type Chart	Gamma
111	2020 Jun 05	Penumbral	1.2406	116	2020 Nov 30	Penumbral	−1.1309
121	2021 May 26	Total	0.4774	126	2021 Nov 19	Partial	−0.4553
131	2022 May 16	Total	−0.2532	136	2022 Nov 08	Total	0.2570
141	2023 May 05	Penumbral	−1.0350	146	2023 Oct 28	Partial	0.9472

=== Metonic series ===
The metonic cycle repeats nearly exactly every 19 years and represents a Saros cycle plus one lunar year. Because it occurs on the same calendar date, the Earth's shadow will in nearly the same location relative to the background stars.

Metonic events: May 4 and October 28
Descending node	Ascending node
1. 1966 May 4 - Penumbral (111); 2. 1985 May 4 - Total (121); 3. 2004 May 4 - Total (131); 4. 2023 May 5 - Penumbral (141)	1. 1966 Oct 29 - Penumbral (116); 2. 1985 Oct 28 - Total (126); 3. 2004 Oct 28 - Total (136); 4. 2023 Oct 28 - Partial (146); 5. 2042 Oct 28 - Penumbral (156)

=== Saros 141 ===
This eclipse is a part of Saros series 141, repeating every 18 years, 11 days, and containing 72 events. The series started with a penumbral lunar eclipse on August 25, 1608. It contains partial eclipses from May 16, 2041 through July 20, 2149; total eclipses from August 1, 2167 through May 1, 2618; and a second set of partial eclipses from May 12, 2636 through July 16, 2744. The series ends at member 72 as a penumbral eclipse on October 11, 2888.

The longest duration of totality will be produced by member 39 at 104 minutes, 36 seconds on October 16, 2293. All eclipses in this series occur at the Moon’s descending node of orbit.

Greatest	First			
The greatest eclipse of the series will occur on 2293 Oct 16, lasting 104 minutes, 36 seconds.	Penumbral	Partial	Total	Central
The greatest eclipse of the series will occur on 2293 Oct 16, lasting 104 minutes, 36 seconds.	1608 Aug 25	2041 May 16	2167 Aug 01	2221 Sep 02
The greatest eclipse of the series will occur on 2293 Oct 16, lasting 104 minutes, 36 seconds.	Last			
The greatest eclipse of the series will occur on 2293 Oct 16, lasting 104 minutes, 36 seconds.	Central	Total	Partial	Penumbral
The greatest eclipse of the series will occur on 2293 Oct 16, lasting 104 minutes, 36 seconds.	2546 Mar 18	2618 May 01	2744 Jul 16	2888 Oct 11

Eclipses are tabulated in three columns; every third eclipse in the same column is one exeligmos apart, so they all cast shadows over approximately the same parts of the Earth.

Series members 12–33 occur between 1801 and 2200:
12	13	14
1806 Dec 25	1825 Jan 04	1843 Jan 16
15	16	17
1861 Jan 26	1879 Feb 07	1897 Feb 17
18	19	20
1915 Mar 01	1933 Mar 12	1951 Mar 23
21	22	23
1969 Apr 02	1987 Apr 14	2005 Apr 24
24	25	26
2023 May 05	2041 May 16	2059 May 27
27	28	29
2077 Jun 06	2095 Jun 17	2113 Jun 29
30	31	32
2131 Jul 10	2149 Jul 20	2167 Aug 01
33
2185 Aug 11

=== Tritos series ===
This eclipse is a part of a tritos cycle, repeating at alternating nodes every 135 synodic months (≈ 3986.63 days, or 11 years minus 1 month). Their appearance and longitude are irregular due to a lack of synchronization with the anomalistic month (period of perigee), but groupings of 3 tritos cycles (≈ 33 years minus 3 months) come close (≈ 434.044 anomalistic months), so eclipses are similar in these groupings.

Series members between 1801 and 2187
1805 Jan 15 (Saros 121)	1815 Dec 16 (Saros 122)	1826 Nov 14 (Saros 123)	1837 Oct 13 (Saros 124)	1848 Sep 13 (Saros 125)
1859 Aug 13 (Saros 126)	1870 Jul 12 (Saros 127)	1881 Jun 12 (Saros 128)	1892 May 11 (Saros 129)	1903 Apr 12 (Saros 130)
1914 Mar 12 (Saros 131)	1925 Feb 08 (Saros 132)	1936 Jan 08 (Saros 133)	1946 Dec 08 (Saros 134)	1957 Nov 07 (Saros 135)
1968 Oct 06 (Saros 136)	1979 Sep 06 (Saros 137)	1990 Aug 06 (Saros 138)	2001 Jul 05 (Saros 139)	2012 Jun 04 (Saros 140)
2023 May 05 (Saros 141)	2034 Apr 03 (Saros 142)	2045 Mar 03 (Saros 143)	2056 Feb 01 (Saros 144)	2066 Dec 31 (Saros 145)
2077 Nov 29 (Saros 146)	2088 Oct 30 (Saros 147)	2099 Sep 29 (Saros 148)	2110 Aug 29 (Saros 149)	2121 Jul 30 (Saros 150)
2132 Jun 28 (Saros 151)	2143 May 28 (Saros 152)	2154 Apr 28 (Saros 153)		
2187 Jan 24 (Saros 156)

=== Inex series ===
This eclipse is a part of the long period inex cycle, repeating at alternating nodes, every 358 synodic months (≈ 10,571.95 days, or 29 years minus 20 days). Their appearance and longitude are irregular due to a lack of synchronization with the anomalistic month (period of perigee). However, groupings of 3 inex cycles (≈ 87 years minus 2 months) comes close (≈ 1,151.02 anomalistic months), so eclipses are similar in these groupings.

Series members between 1801 and 2200
1820 Sep 22 (Saros 134)	1849 Sep 02 (Saros 135)	1878 Aug 13 (Saros 136)
1907 Jul 25 (Saros 137)	1936 Jul 04 (Saros 138)	1965 Jun 14 (Saros 139)
1994 May 25 (Saros 140)	2023 May 05 (Saros 141)	2052 Apr 14 (Saros 142)
2081 Mar 25 (Saros 143)	2110 Mar 06 (Saros 144)	2139 Feb 13 (Saros 145)
2168 Jan 24 (Saros 146)	2197 Jan 04 (Saros 147)	

=== Half-Saros cycle ===
A lunar eclipse will be preceded and followed by solar eclipses by 9 years and 5.5 days (a half saros). This lunar eclipse is related to two annular solar eclipses of Solar Saros 148.

April 29, 2014	May 9, 2032

== See also ==
- List of lunar eclipses and List of 21st-century lunar eclipses
