= February 1951 lunar eclipse =

Extremely short lunar eclipse

- Penumbral eclipse
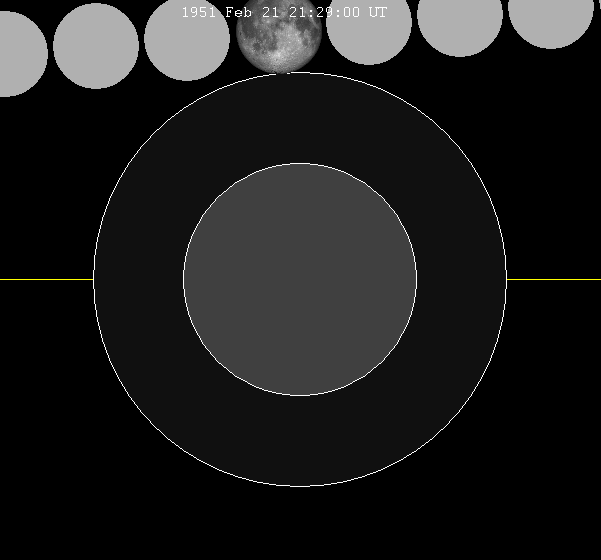
- The Moon's hourly motion shown right to left
- Date: February 21, 1951
- Gamma: 1.5806
- Magnitude: −1.0600
- Saros cycle: 103 (83 of 83)
- Penumbral: 12 minutes, 18 seconds
Contacts (UTC)
- P1: 21:17
- Greatest: 21:29
- P4: 21:41

A penumbral lunar eclipse occurred at the Moon’s descending node of orbit on Wednesday, February 21, 1951, with an umbral magnitude of −1.0600. A lunar eclipse occurs when the Moon moves into the Earth's shadow, causing the Moon to be darkened. A penumbral lunar eclipse occurs when part or all of the Moon's near side passes into the Earth's penumbra. Unlike a solar eclipse, which can only be viewed from a relatively small area of the world, a lunar eclipse may be viewed from anywhere on the night side of Earth. Occurring about 6.5 days after apogee (on February 15, 1951, at 9:35 UTC), the Moon's apparent diameter was smaller.

This eclipse was the first of four penumbral lunar eclipses in 1951, with the others occurring on March 23, August 17, and September 15.

== Grazing penumbral eclipse ==
The magnitude of the eclipse was 0.007 or a miss depending on definitions of the penumbral shadow is defined. Bao-Lin Lui's Canon of lunar eclipses list it as the last eclipse of a saros cycle, with magnitude 0.007, while NASA lists February 10, 1933, as the final series event, with this one missing the shadow.

As seen from the lunar south pole, the sun misses the sphere of the earth, excluding the atmosphere.

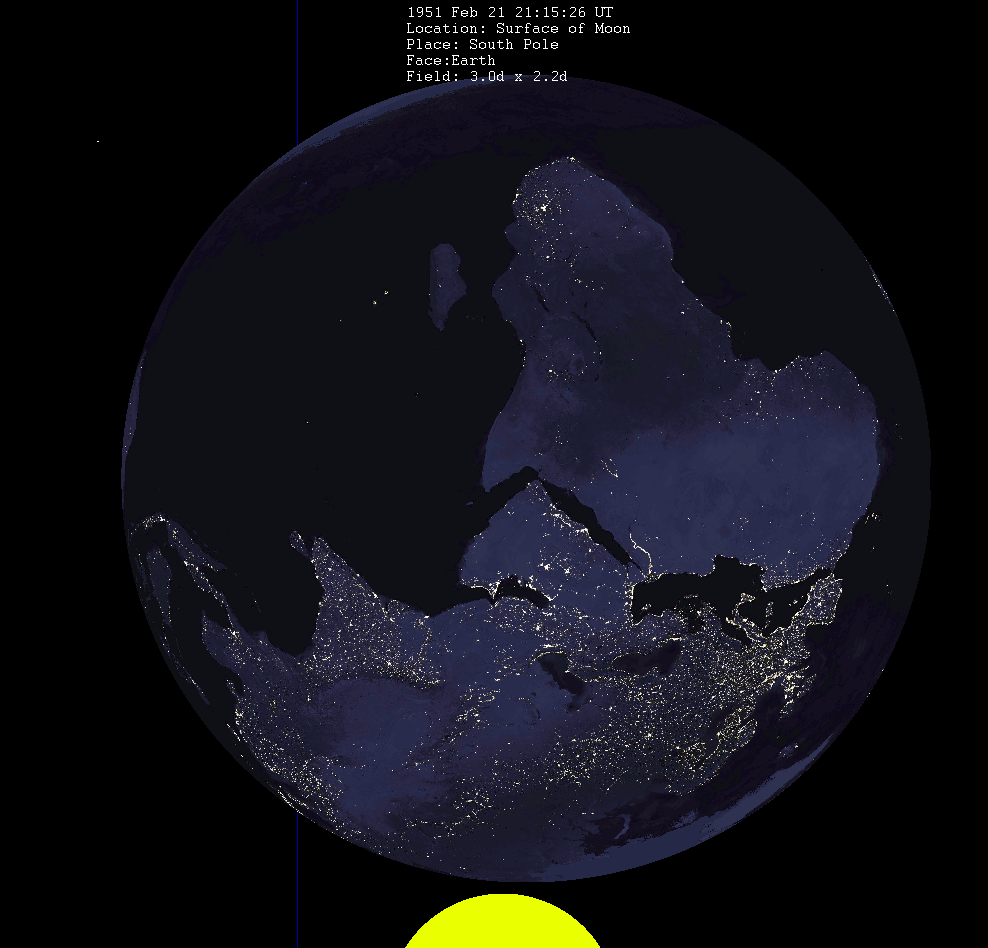

== Visibility ==
The eclipse was completely visible over Africa, Europe, and much of Asia.

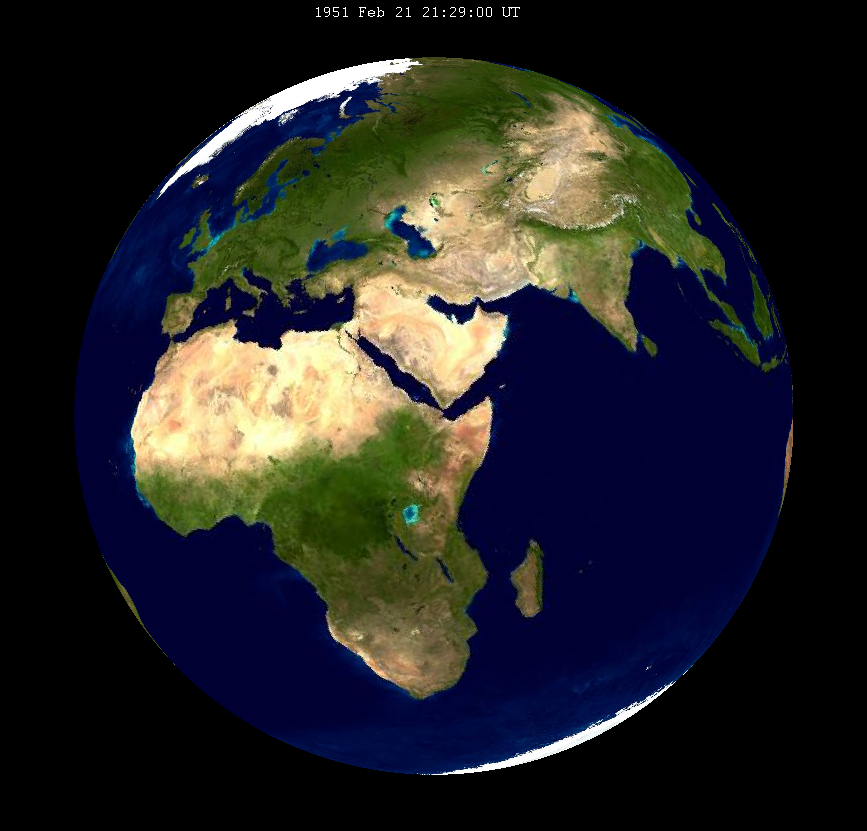
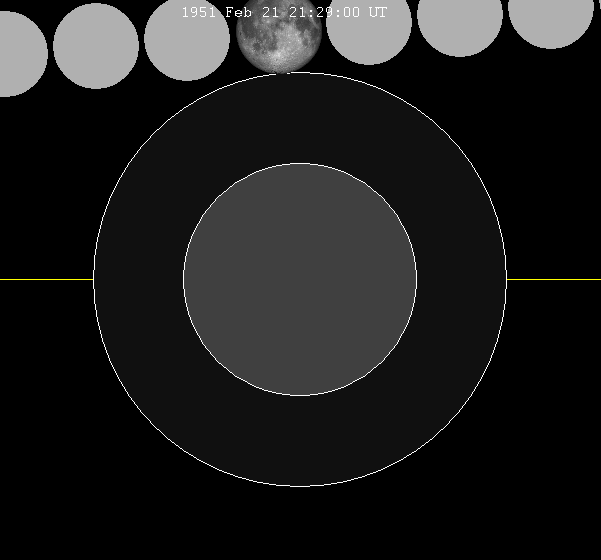

== Eclipse season ==
This eclipse is part of an eclipse season, a period, roughly every six months, when eclipses occur. Only two (or occasionally three) eclipse seasons occur each year, and each season lasts about 35 days and repeats just short of six months (173 days) later; thus two full eclipse seasons always occur each year. Either two or three eclipses happen each eclipse season. In the sequence below, each eclipse is separated by a fortnight. The first and last eclipse in this sequence is separated by one synodic month.

Eclipse season of February–March 1951
February 21 Descending node (full moon)	March 7 Ascending node (new moon)	March 23 Descending node (full moon)
Penumbral lunar eclipse Lunar Saros 103	Annular solar eclipse Solar Saros 129	Penumbral lunar eclipse Lunar Saros 141

== Related eclipses ==
=== Eclipses in 1951 ===
- A penumbral lunar eclipse on February 21.
- An annular solar eclipse on March 7.
- A penumbral lunar eclipse on March 23.
- A penumbral lunar eclipse on August 17.
- An annular solar eclipse on September 1.
- A penumbral lunar eclipse on September 15.

=== Tzolkinex ===
- Followed by: Lunar eclipse of April 4, 1958

=== Tritos ===
- Preceded by: Lunar eclipse of March 23, 1940

=== Lunar Saros 103 ===
- Preceded by: Lunar eclipse of February 10, 1933

=== Inex ===
- Preceded by: Lunar eclipse of March 13, 1922

=== Lunar eclipses of 1951–1955 ===
This eclipse is a member of a semester series. An eclipse in a semester series of lunar eclipses repeats approximately every 177 days and 4 hours (a semester) at alternating nodes of the Moon's orbit.

The penumbral lunar eclipses on March 23, 1951 and September 15, 1951 occur in the previous lunar year eclipse set, and the lunar eclipses on June 5, 1955 (penumbral) and November 29, 1955 (partial) occur in the next lunar year eclipse set.

Lunar eclipse series sets from 1951 to 1955
Descending node				Ascending node			
Saros	Date Viewing	Type Chart	Gamma	Saros	Date Viewing	Type Chart	Gamma
103	1951 Feb 21	Penumbral	−	108	1951 Aug 17	Penumbral	−1.4828
113	1952 Feb 11	Partial	0.9416	118	1952 Aug 05	Partial	−0.7384
123	1953 Jan 29	Total	0.2606	128	1953 Jul 26	Total	−0.0071
133	1954 Jan 19	Total	−0.4357	138	1954 Jul 16	Partial	0.7877
143	1955 Jan 08	Penumbral	−1.0907				

=== Metonic series ===
The Metonic cycle repeats nearly exactly every 19 years and represents a Saros cycle plus one lunar year. Because it occurs on the same calendar date, the Earth's shadow will in nearly the same location relative to the background stars.

Metonic lunar eclipse sets 1951–2027
Descending node			Ascending node		
Saros	Date	Type	Saros	Date	Type
103	1951 Feb 21.88	Penumbral	108	1951 Aug 17.13	Penumbral
113	1970 Feb 21.35	Partial	118	1970 Aug 17.14	Partial
123	1989 Feb 20.64	Total	128	1989 Aug 17.13	Total
133	2008 Feb 21.14	Total	138	2008 Aug 16.88	Partial
143	2027 Feb 20.96	Penumbral	148	2027 Aug 17.30	Penumbral

=== Saros 103 ===
This eclipse is a part of Saros series 103, repeating every 18 years, 11 days, and containing 82 or 83 events (depending on the source). The series started with a penumbral lunar eclipse on September 3, 472 AD. It contains partial eclipses from April 19, 851 AD through June 23, 959 AD; total eclipses from July 3, 977 AD through May 3, 1482; and a second set of partial eclipses from May 13, 1500 through July 27, 1608. The series ends at member 82 as a penumbral eclipse on February 10, 1933, though some sources count a possible penumbral eclipse on February 21, 1951 as the last eclipse of the series.

The longest duration of totality was produced by member 36 at 98 minutes, 57 seconds on September 17, 1103. All eclipses in this series occur at the Moon’s descending node of orbit.

Greatest	First			
The greatest eclipse of the series occurred on 1103 Sep 17, lasting 98 minutes, 57 seconds.	Penumbral	Partial	Total	Central
The greatest eclipse of the series occurred on 1103 Sep 17, lasting 98 minutes, 57 seconds.	472 Sep 03	851 Apr 19	977 Jul 03	1031 Aug 05
The greatest eclipse of the series occurred on 1103 Sep 17, lasting 98 minutes, 57 seconds.	Last			
The greatest eclipse of the series occurred on 1103 Sep 17, lasting 98 minutes, 57 seconds.	Central	Total	Partial	Penumbral
The greatest eclipse of the series occurred on 1103 Sep 17, lasting 98 minutes, 57 seconds.	1410 Mar 21	1482 May 3	1608 Jul 27	1933 Feb 10

Eclipses are tabulated in three columns; every third eclipse in the same column is one exeligmos apart, so they all cast shadows over approximately the same parts of the Earth.

Series members 75–83 occur between 1801 and 1951:
75	76	77
1806 Nov 26	1824 Dec 06	1842 Dec 17
78	79	80
1860 Dec 28	1879 Jan 08	1897 Jan 18
81	82	83
1915 Jan 31	1933 Feb 10	1951 Feb 21

=== Tritos series ===
This eclipse is a part of a tritos cycle, repeating at alternating nodes every 135 synodic months (≈ 3986.63 days, or 11 years minus 1 month). Their appearance and longitude are irregular due to a lack of synchronization with the anomalistic month (period of perigee), but groupings of 3 tritos cycles (≈ 33 years minus 3 months) come close (≈ 434.044 anomalistic months), so eclipses are similar in these groupings.

Series members between 1940 and 2200
1940 Mar 23 (Saros 102)	1951 Feb 21 (Saros 103)			
			2027 Jul 18 (Saros 110)	2038 Jun 17 (Saros 111)
2049 May 17 (Saros 112)	2060 Apr 15 (Saros 113)	2071 Mar 16 (Saros 114)	2082 Feb 13 (Saros 115)	2093 Jan 12 (Saros 116)
2103 Dec 13 (Saros 117)	2114 Nov 12 (Saros 118)	2125 Oct 12 (Saros 119)	2136 Sep 10 (Saros 120)	2147 Aug 11 (Saros 121)
2158 Jul 11 (Saros 122)	2169 Jun 09 (Saros 123)	2180 May 09 (Saros 124)	2191 Apr 09 (Saros 125)	

=== Inex series ===
This eclipse is a part of the long period inex cycle, repeating at alternating nodes, every 358 synodic months (≈ 10,571.95 days, or 29 years minus 20 days). Their appearance and longitude are irregular due to a lack of synchronization with the anomalistic month (period of perigee). However, groupings of 3 inex cycles (≈ 87 years minus 2 months) comes close (≈ 1,151.02 anomalistic months), so eclipses are similar in these groupings.

Series members between 1835 and 1951
1835 May 12 (Saros 99)	
1922 Mar 13 (Saros 102)	1951 Feb 21 (Saros 103)

== See also ==
- List of lunar eclipses
- List of 20th-century lunar eclipses
- August 2016 lunar eclipse
- October 2042 lunar eclipse
