= February 1933 lunar eclipse =

Penumbral lunar eclipse February 10, 1933

- Penumbral eclipse
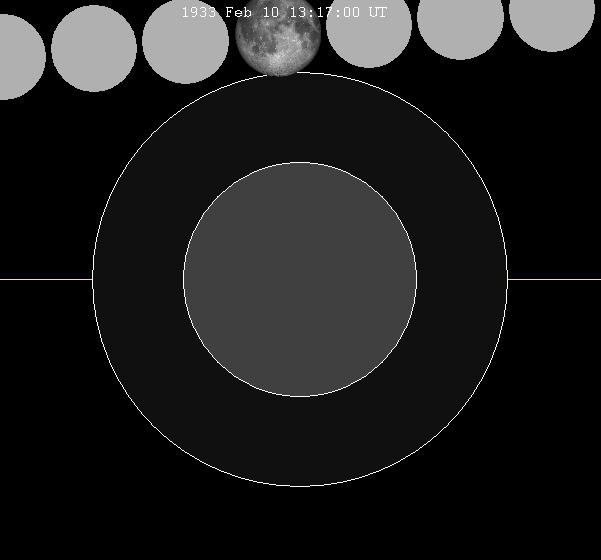
- The Moon's hourly motion shown right to left
- Date: February 10, 1933
- Gamma: 1.5600
- Magnitude: −1.0268
- Saros cycle: 103 (83 of 84)
- Penumbral: 39 minutes, 34 seconds
Contacts (UTC)
- P1: 12:57:32
- Greatest: 13:17:09
- P4: 13:37:06

A penumbral lunar eclipse occurred at the Moon's descending node of orbit on Friday, February 10, 1933, with an umbral magnitude of −1.0268. A lunar eclipse occurs when the Moon moves into the Earth's shadow, causing the Moon to be darkened. A penumbral lunar eclipse occurs when part or all of the Moon's near side passes into the Earth's penumbra. Unlike a solar eclipse, which can only be viewed from a relatively small area of the world, a lunar eclipse may be viewed from anywhere on the night side of Earth. The Moon's apparent diameter was near the average diameter because it occurred 6.7 days after apogee (on February 3, 1933, at 21:10 UTC) and 7.9 days before perigee (on February 18, 1933, at 10:50 UTC).

This eclipse was the first of four penumbral lunar eclipses in 1933, with the others occurring on March 12, August 5, and September 4.

== Visibility ==
The eclipse was completely visible over much of Asia, Australia, and western North America.

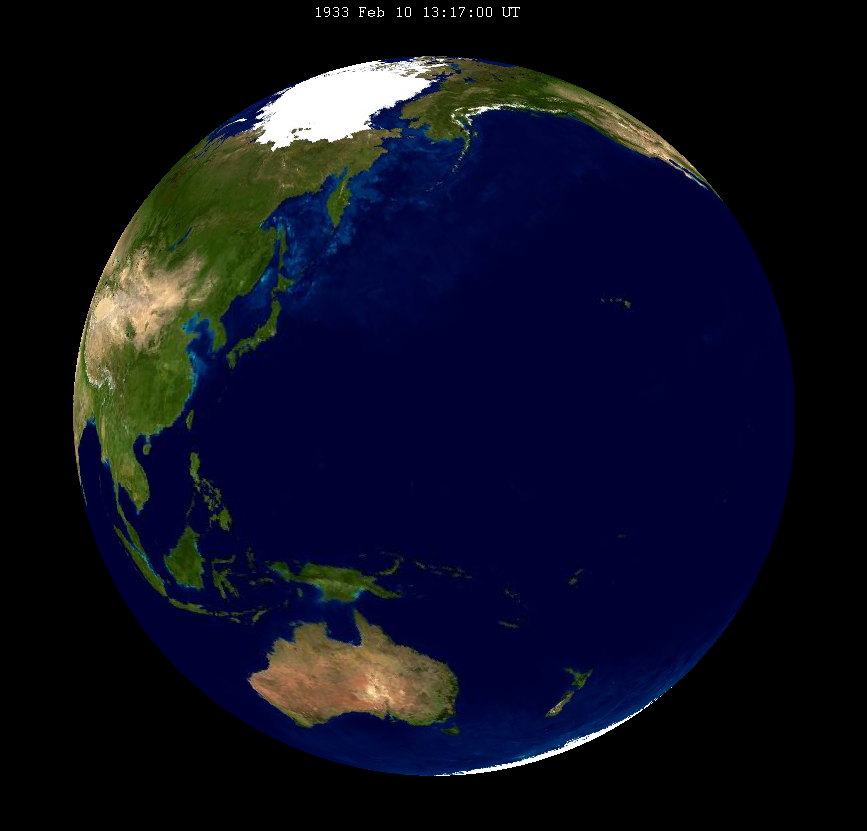
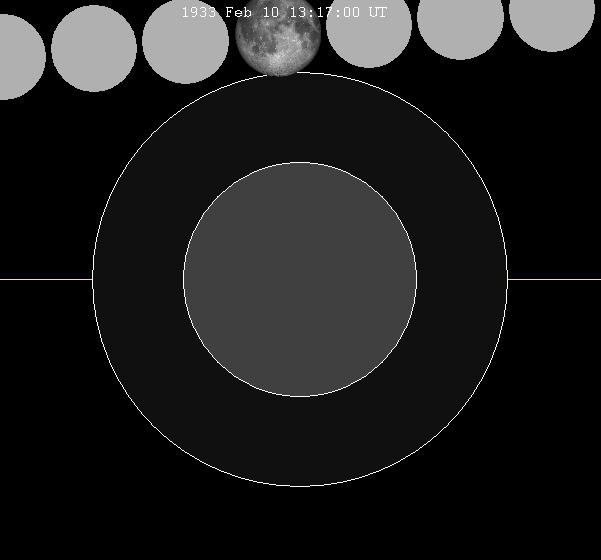

== Eclipse details ==
Shown below is a table displaying details about this particular solar eclipse. It describes various parameters pertaining to this eclipse.

February 10, 1933 Lunar Eclipse Parameters
Parameter	Value
Penumbral Magnitude	0.01836
Umbral Magnitude	−1.02680
Gamma	1.56004
Sun Right Ascension	21h35m02.2s
Sun Declination	-14°22'59.8"
Sun Semi-Diameter	16'12.3"
Sun Equatorial Horizontal Parallax	08.9"
Moon Right Ascension	09h37m33.3s
Moon Declination	+15°43'55.4"
Moon Semi-Diameter	15'30.3"
Moon Equatorial Horizontal Parallax	0°56'54.2"
ΔT	23.9 s

== Eclipse season ==
This eclipse is part of an eclipse season, a period, roughly every six months, when eclipses occur. Only two (or occasionally three) eclipse seasons occur each year, and each season lasts about 35 days and repeats just short of six months (173 days) later; thus two full eclipse seasons always occur each year. Either two or three eclipses happen each eclipse season. In the sequence below, each eclipse is separated by a fortnight. The first and last eclipse in this sequence is separated by one synodic month.

Eclipse season of February–March 1933
February 10 Descending node (full moon)	February 24 Ascending node (new moon)	March 12 Descending node (full moon)
Penumbral lunar eclipse Lunar Saros 103	Annular solar eclipse Solar Saros 129	Penumbral lunar eclipse Lunar Saros 141

== Related eclipses ==
=== Eclipses in 1933 ===
- A penumbral lunar eclipse on February 10.
- An annular solar eclipse on February 24.
- A penumbral lunar eclipse on March 12.
- A penumbral lunar eclipse on August 5.
- An annular solar eclipse on August 21.
- A penumbral lunar eclipse on September 4.

=== Tzolkinex ===
- Followed by: Lunar eclipse of March 23, 1940

=== Tritos ===
- Preceded by: Lunar eclipse of March 13, 1922

=== Lunar Saros 103 ===
- Preceded by: Lunar eclipse of January 31, 1915
- Followed by: Lunar eclipse of February 21, 1951

=== Inex ===
- Preceded by: Lunar eclipse of March 2, 1904

=== Triad ===
- Preceded by: Lunar eclipse of April 11, 1846

=== Lunar eclipses of 1933–1936 ===
This eclipse is a member of a semester series. An eclipse in a semester series of lunar eclipses repeats approximately every 177 days and 4 hours (a semester) at alternating nodes of the Moon's orbit.

The penumbral lunar eclipses on March 12, 1933 and September 4, 1933 occur in the previous lunar year eclipse set.

Lunar eclipse series sets from 1933 to 1936
Descending node				Ascending node			
Saros	Date Viewing	Type Chart	Gamma	Saros	Date Viewing	Type Chart	Gamma
103	1933 Feb 10	Penumbral	1.5600	108	1933 Aug 05	Penumbral	−1.4216
113	1934 Jan 30	Partial	0.9258	118	1934 Jul 26	Partial	−0.6681
123	1935 Jan 19	Total	0.2498	128	1935 Jul 16	Total	0.0672
133	1936 Jan 08	Total	−0.4429	138	1936 Jul 04	Partial	0.8642
143	1936 Dec 28	Penumbral	−1.0971				

=== Saros 103 ===
This eclipse is a part of Saros series 103, repeating every 18 years, 11 days, and containing 82 or 83 events (depending on the source). The series started with a penumbral lunar eclipse on September 3, 472 AD. It contains partial eclipses from April 19, 851 AD through June 23, 959 AD; total eclipses from July 3, 977 AD through May 3, 1482; and a second set of partial eclipses from May 13, 1500, through July 27, 1608. The series ends at member 82 as a penumbral eclipse on February 10, 1933, though some sources count a possible penumbral eclipse on February 21, 1951 as the last eclipse of the series.

The longest duration of totality was produced by member 36 at 98 minutes, 57 seconds on September 17, 1103. All eclipses in this series occur at the Moon's descending node of orbit.

Greatest	First			
The greatest eclipse of the series occurred on 1103 Sep 17, lasting 98 minutes, 57 seconds.	Penumbral	Partial	Total	Central
The greatest eclipse of the series occurred on 1103 Sep 17, lasting 98 minutes, 57 seconds.	472 Sep 03	851 Apr 19	977 Jul 03	1031 Aug 05
The greatest eclipse of the series occurred on 1103 Sep 17, lasting 98 minutes, 57 seconds.	Last			
The greatest eclipse of the series occurred on 1103 Sep 17, lasting 98 minutes, 57 seconds.	Central	Total	Partial	Penumbral
The greatest eclipse of the series occurred on 1103 Sep 17, lasting 98 minutes, 57 seconds.	1410 Mar 21	1482 May 3	1608 Jul 27	1933 Feb 10

Eclipses are tabulated in three columns; every third eclipse in the same column is one exeligmos apart, so they all cast shadows over approximately the same parts of the Earth.

Series members 75–83 occur between 1801 and 1951:
75	76	77
1806 Nov 26	1824 Dec 06	1842 Dec 17
78	79	80
1860 Dec 28	1879 Jan 08	1897 Jan 18
81	82	83
1915 Jan 31	1933 Feb 10	1951 Feb 21

=== Tritos series ===
This eclipse is a part of a tritos cycle, repeating at alternating nodes every 135 synodic months (≈ 3986.63 days, or 11 years minus 1 month). Their appearance and longitude are irregular due to a lack of synchronization with the anomalistic month (period of perigee), but groupings of 3 tritos cycles (≈ 33 years minus 3 months) come close (≈ 434.044 anomalistic months), so eclipses are similar in these groupings.

Series members between 1922 and 2200
1922 Mar 13 (Saros 102)	1933 Feb 10 (Saros 103)			
		1998 Aug 08 (Saros 109)	2009 Jul 07 (Saros 110)	2020 Jun 05 (Saros 111)
2031 May 07 (Saros 112)	2042 Apr 05 (Saros 113)	2053 Mar 04 (Saros 114)	2064 Feb 02 (Saros 115)	2075 Jan 02 (Saros 116)
2085 Dec 01 (Saros 117)	2096 Oct 31 (Saros 118)	2107 Oct 02 (Saros 119)	2118 Aug 31 (Saros 120)	2129 Jul 31 (Saros 121)
2140 Jun 30 (Saros 122)	2151 May 30 (Saros 123)	2162 Apr 29 (Saros 124)	2173 Mar 29 (Saros 125)	2184 Feb 26 (Saros 126)
2195 Jan 26 (Saros 127)

=== Inex series ===
This eclipse is a part of the long period inex cycle, repeating at alternating nodes, every 358 synodic months (≈ 10,571.95 days, or 29 years minus 20 days). Their appearance and longitude are irregular due to a lack of synchronization with the anomalistic month (period of perigee). However, groupings of 3 inex cycles (≈ 87 years minus 2 months) comes close (≈ 1,151.02 anomalistic months), so eclipses are similar in these groupings.

Series members between 1801 and 1933
1817 May 01 (Saros 99)	1846 Apr 11 (Saros 100)
1904 Mar 02 (Saros 102)	1933 Feb 10 (Saros 103)

== See also ==
- List of lunar eclipses
- List of 20th-century lunar eclipses
