= Lunar Saros 103 =

Series of lunar eclipses

Saros cycle series 103 for lunar eclipses occurred at the moon's descending node, 18 years 11 and 1/3 days. It contained at least 82 events.

Cat.	Saros	Mem	Date	Time UT (hr:mn)	Type	Gamma	Magnitude	Duration (min)			Contacts UT (hr:mn)						Chart
Cat.	Saros	Mem	Date	Greatest	Type	Gamma	Magnitude	Pen.	Par.	Tot.	P1	P4	U1	U2	U3	U4	Chart
05941	103	1	472 Sep 3	12:30:19	Penumbral	-1.5287	-0.9764	86.6			11:47:01	13:13:37					
05988	103	2	490 Sep 14	19:57:05	Penumbral	-1.4826	-0.8922	121.9			18:56:08	20:58:02					
06033	103	3	508 Sep 25	3:35:20	Penumbral	-1.4447	-0.8228	143.9			2:23:23	4:47:17					
06078	103	4	526 Oct 06	11:21:56	Penumbral	-1.4128	-0.7643	159.4			10:02:14	12:41:38					
06123	103	5	544 Oct 16	19:19:38	Penumbral	-1.3888	-0.7202	169.7			17:54:47	20:44:29					
06169	103	6	562 Oct 28	3:24:31	Penumbral	-1.3698	-0.6852	177.0			1:56:01	4:53:01					
06215	103	7	580 Nov 07	11:37:22	Penumbral	-1.3563	-0.6599	181.7			10:06:31	13:08:13					
06262	103	8	598 Nov 18	19:55:27	Penumbral	-1.3461	-0.6405	184.8			18:23:03	21:27:51					
06309	103	9	616 Nov 29	4:19:10	Penumbral	-1.3394	-0.6271	186.5			2:45:55	5:52:25					
06355	103	10	634 Dec 10	12:44:10	Penumbral	-1.3332	-0.6143	187.8			11:10:16	14:18:04					
06401	103	11	652 Dec 20	21:10:19	Penumbral	-1.3269	-0.6011	189.0			19:35:49	22:44:49					
06446	103	12	671 Jan 01	5:35:08	Penumbral	-1.3188	-0.5841	190.7			3:59:47	7:10:29					
06491	103	13	689 Jan 11	13:58:39	Penumbral	-1.3085	-0.5629	193.0			12:22:09	15:35:09					
06536	103	14	707 Jan 22	22:16:17	Penumbral	-1.2927	-0.5314	196.9			20:37:50	23:54:44					
06580	103	15	725 Feb 02	6:29:58	Penumbral	-1.2731	-0.4926	201.8			4:49:04	8:10:52					
06624	103	16	743 Feb 13	14:36:05	Penumbral	-1.2466	-0.4409	208.4			12:51:53	16:20:17					
06668	103	17	761 Feb 23	22:37:07	Penumbral	-1.2151	-0.3801	215.8			20:49:13	0:25:01					
06712	103	18	779 Mar 07	6:28:42	Penumbral	-1.1750	-0.3034	224.8			4:36:18	8:21:06					
06754	103	19	797 Mar 17	14:15:23	Penumbral	-1.1301	-0.2178	234.1			12:18:20	16:12:26					
06795	103	20	815 Mar 28	21:53:31	Penumbral	-1.0774	-0.1181	244.1			19:51:28	23:55:34					
06836	103	21	833 Apr 08	5:26:40	Penumbral	-1.0197	-0.0092	254.0			3:19:40	7:33:40					
06876	103	22	851 Apr 19	12:52:52	Partial	-0.9554	0.1116	264.0	74.6		10:40:52	15:04:52	12:15:34			13:30:10	
06917	103	23	869 Apr 29	20:16:05	Partial	-0.8876	0.2386	273.4	106.9		17:59:23	22:32:47	19:22:38			21:09:32	
06958	103	24	887 May 11	3:34:50	Partial	-0.8151	0.3739	282.2	130.8		1:13:44	5:55:56	2:29:26			4:40:14	
07000	103	25	905 May 21	10:51:32	Partial	-0.7399	0.5141	290.2	149.7		8:26:26	13:16:38	9:36:41			12:06:23	
07040	103	26	923 Jun 01	18:07:03	Partial	-0.6630	0.6571	297.3	165.0		15:38:24	20:35:42	16:44:33			19:29:33	
07081	103	27	941 Jun 12	1:23:11	Partial	-0.5857	0.8003	303.4	177.3		22:51:29	3:54:53	23:54:32			2:51:50	
07122	103	28	959 Jun 23	8:40:46	Partial	-0.5088	0.9426	308.4	187.2		6:06:34	11:14:58	7:07:10			10:14:22	
07163	103	29	977 Jul 03	16:00:39	Total	-0.4331	1.0824	312.5	195.1	42.6	13:24:24	18:36:54	14:23:06	15:39:21	16:21:57	17:38:12	
07205	103	30	995 Jul 14	23:25:10	Total	-0.3607	1.2159	315.7	201.0	66.0	20:47:19	2:03:01	21:44:40	22:52:10	23:58:10	1:05:40	
07249	103	31	1013 Jul 25	6:54:14	Total	-0.2916	1.3429	318.0	205.5	79.5	4:15:14	9:33:14	5:11:29	6:14:29	7:33:59	8:36:59	
07294	103	32	1031 Aug 05	14:28:58	Total	-0.2270	1.4616	319.6	208.6	88.0	11:49:10	17:08:46	12:44:40	13:44:58	15:12:58	16:13:16	
07339	103	33	1049 Aug 15	22:10:32	Total	-0.1675	1.5706	320.6	210.5	93.5	19:30:14	0:50:50	20:25:17	21:23:47	22:57:17	23:55:47	
07383	103	34	1067 Aug 27	5:59:57	Total	-0.1142	1.6680	321.1	211.7	96.7	3:19:24	8:40:30	4:14:06	5:11:36	6:48:18	7:45:48	
07427	103	35	1085 Sep 06	13:57:40	Total	-0.0677	1.7526	321.2	212.1	98.3	11:17:04	16:38:16	12:11:37	13:08:31	14:46:49	15:43:43	
07473	103	36	1103 Sep 17	22:02:58	Total	-0.0272	1.8262	321.1	212.1	98.9	19:22:25	0:43:31	20:16:55	21:13:31	22:52:25	23:49:01	
07519	103	37	1121 Sep 28	6:17:30	Total	0.0058	1.8648	320.8	211.9	98.9	3:37:06	8:57:54	4:31:33	5:28:03	7:06:57	8:03:27	
07565	103	38	1139 Oct 9	14:39:55	Total	0.0327	1.8147	320.5	211.4	98.5	11:59:40	17:20:10	12:54:13	13:50:40	15:29:10	16:25:37	
07612	103	39	1157 Oct 19	23:10:14	Total	0.0532	1.7763	320.1	211	97.9	20:30:11	1:50:17	21:24:44	22:21:17	23:59:11	0:55:44	
07659	103	40	1175 Oct 31	7:47:11	Total	0.0685	1.7476	319.8	210.5	97.4	5:07:17	10:27:05	6:01:56	6:58:29	8:35:53	9:32:26	
07705	103	41	1193 Nov 10	16:30:23	Total	0.0789	1.7279	319.6	210.2	96.9	13:50:35	19:10:11	14:45:17	15:41:56	17:18:50	18:15:29	
07751	103	42	1211 Nov 22	1:18:37	Total	0.0853	1.7157	319.4	209.9	96.6	22:38:55	3:58:19	23:33:40	0:30:19	2:06:55	3:03:34	
07798	103	43	1229 Dec 02	10:09:23	Total	0.0900	1.7070	319.2	209.7	96.3	7:29:47	12:48:59	8:24:32	9:21:14	10:57:32	11:54:14	
07843	103	44	1247 Dec 13	19:03:01	Total	0.0924	1.7025	319.0	209.6	96.2	16:23:31	21:42:31	17:18:13	18:14:55	19:51:07	20:47:49	
07888	103	45	1265 Dec 24	3:55:57	Total	0.0958	1.6966	318.9	209.5	96.0	1:16:30	6:35:24	2:11:12	3:07:57	4:43:57	5:40:42	
07933	103	46	1284 Jan 04	12:48:12	Total	0.0995	1.6903	318.7	209.4	95.9	10:08:51	15:27:33	11:03:30	12:00:15	13:36:09	14:32:54	
07978	103	47	1302 Jan 14	21:35:54	Total	0.1072	1.6768	318.5	209.3	95.6	18:56:39	0:15:09	19:51:15	20:48:06	22:23:42	23:20:33	
08021	103	48	1320 Jan 26	6:20:48	Total	0.1171	1.6594	318.3	209.2	95.2	3:41:39	8:59:57	4:36:12	5:33:12	7:08:24	8:05:24	
08063	103	49	1338 Feb 05	14:59:11	Total	0.1328	1.6315	318.0	208.9	94.5	12:20:11	17:38:11	13:14:44	14:11:56	15:46:26	16:43:38	
08105	103	50	1356 Feb 16	23:31:22	Total	0.1535	1.5946	317.6	208.5	93.3	20:52:34	2:10:10	21:47:07	22:44:43	0:18:01	1:15:37	
08146	103	51	1374 Feb 27	7:55:14	Total	0.1809	1.5452	317.0	207.8	91.3	5:16:44	10:33:44	6:11:20	7:09:35	8:40:53	9:39:08	
08187	103	52	1392 Mar 09	16:12:14	Total	0.2141	1.4854	316.1	206.7	88.4	13:34:11	18:50:17	14:28:53	15:28:02	16:56:26	17:55:35	
08228	103	53	1410 Mar 21	0:20:45	Total	0.2544	1.4125	315.0	205.0	83.9	21:43:15	2:58:15	22:38:15	23:38:48	1:02:42	2:03:15	
08270	103	54	1428 Mar 31	8:21:15	Total	0.3013	1.3273	313.4	202.5	77.2	5:44:33	10:57:57	6:40:00	7:42:39	8:59:51	10:02:30	
08312	103	55	1446 Apr 11	16:14:02	Total	0.3545	1.2303	311.3	199.1	67.0	13:38:23	18:49:41	14:34:29	15:40:32	16:47:32	17:53:35	
08353	103	56	1464 Apr 22	0:00:10	Total	0.4130	1.1235	308.5	194.6	50.8	21:25:55	2:34:25	22:22:52	23:34:46	0:25:34	1:37:28	
08393	103	57	1482 May 3	7:39:00	Total	0.4772	1.0059	305.0	188.5	11.5	5:06:30	10:11:30	6:04:45	7:33:15	7:44:45	9:13:15	
08433	103	58	1500 May 13	15:12:36	Partial	0.5457	0.8802	300.5	180.6		12:42:21	17:42:51	13:42:18			16:42:54	
08473	103	59	1518 May 24	22:40:54	Partial	0.6180	0.7473	295.0	170.5		20:13:24	1:08:24	21:15:39			0:06:09	
08514	103	60	1536 Jun 04	6:06:33	Partial	0.6920	0.6109	288.5	157.9		3:42:18	8:30:48	4:47:36			7:25:30	
08556	103	61	1554 Jun 15	13:27:59	Partial	0.7688	0.4691	280.7	141.8		11:07:38	15:48:20	12:17:05			14:38:53	
08599	103	62	1572 Jun 25	20:49:39	Partial	0.8446	0.3288	271.9	121.5		18:33:42	23:05:36	19:48:54			21:50:24	
08642	103	63	1590 Jul 17	4:09:55	Partial	0.9206	0.1879	261.7	93.9		1:59:04	6:20:46	3:22:58			4:56:52	
08685	103	64	1608 Jul 27	11:33:02	Partial	0.9936	0.0520	250.7	50.5		9:27:41	13:38:23	11:07:47			11:58:17	
08730	103	65	1626 Aug 07	18:56:24	Penumbral	1.0655	-0.0820	238.2			16:57:18	20:55:30					
08774	103	66	1644 Aug 18	2:25:18	Penumbral	1.1319	-0.2062	225.2			0:32:42	4:17:54					
08819	103	67	1662 Aug 29	9:57:01	Penumbral	1.1951	-0.3247	211.1			8:11:28	11:42:34					
08865	103	68	1680 Sep 08	17:35:19	Penumbral	1.2521	-0.4320	196.8			15:56:55	19:13:43					
08911	103	69	1698 Sep 20	1:18:39	Penumbral	1.3043	-0.5308	181.8			23:47:45	2:49:33					
08957	103	70	1716 Oct 01	9:10:11	Penumbral	1.3494	-0.6163	167.3			7:46:32	10:33:50					
09004	103	71	1734 Oct 12	17:08:05	Penumbral	1.3883	-0.6908	153.1			15:51:32	18:24:38					
09051	103	72	1752 Oct 23	1:12:56	Penumbral	1.4211	-0.7539	139.7			0:03:05	2:22:47					
09097	103	73	1770 Nov 03	9:24:30	Penumbral	1.4478	-0.8057	127.5			8:20:45	10:28:15					
09142	103	74	1788 Nov 13	17:42:36	Penumbral	1.4689	-0.8471	116.8			16:44:12	18:41:00					
09187	103	75	1806 Nov 26	2:05:38	Penumbral	1.4853	-0.8797	107.8			1:11:44	2:59:32					
09232	103	76	1824 Dec 06	10:32:41	Penumbral	1.4980	-0.9053	100.3			9:42:32	11:22:50					
09278	103	77	1842 Dec 17	19:02:29	Penumbral	1.5078	-0.9253	94.1			18:15:26	19:49:32					
09323	103	78	1860 Dec 28	3:33:54	Penumbral	1.5159	-0.9419	88.7			2:49:33	4:18:15					
09367	103	79	1879 Jan 08	12:04:10	Penumbral	1.5243	-0.9587	82.3			11:23:01	12:45:19					
09411	103	80	1897 Jan 18	20:33:07	Penumbral	1.5332	-0.9763	74.5			19:55:52	21:10:22					
09453	103	81	1915 Jan 31	4:57:42	Penumbral	1.5450	-0.9989	62.0			4:26:42	5:28:42					
09495	103	82	1933 Feb 10	13:17:33	Penumbral	1.5600	-1.0270	39.6			12:57:45	13:37:21					
−	103	83	1951 Feb 21	21:29:11	Penumbral/Miss	1.5806	-1.0600	24.6			21:17:05	21:41:40					

== See also ==
- List of lunar eclipses
  - List of Saros series for lunar eclipses
