= November 1947 lunar eclipse =

Penumbral lunar eclipse November 28, 1947

- Penumbral eclipse
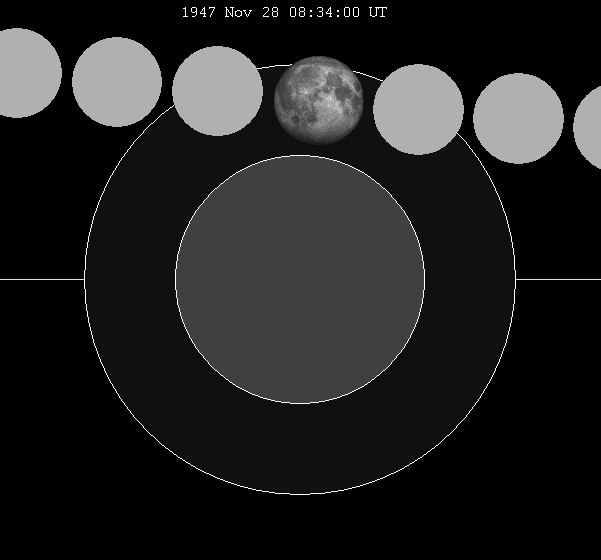
- The Moon's hourly motion shown right to left
- Date: November 28, 1947
- Gamma: 1.0838
- Magnitude: −0.1297
- Saros cycle: 144 (12 of 71)
- Penumbral: 238 minutes, 19 seconds
Contacts (UTC)
- P1: 6:34:54
- Greatest: 8:34:01
- P4: 10:33:14

A penumbral lunar eclipse occurred at the Moon’s ascending node of orbit on Friday, November 28, 1947, with an umbral magnitude of −0.1297. A lunar eclipse occurs when the Moon moves into the Earth's shadow, causing the Moon to be darkened. A penumbral lunar eclipse occurs when part or all of the Moon's near side passes into the Earth's penumbra. Unlike a solar eclipse, which can only be viewed from a relatively small area of the world, a lunar eclipse may be viewed from anywhere on the night side of Earth. Occurring about 2.4 days before perigee (on November 30, 1947, at 17:45 UTC), the Moon's apparent diameter was larger.

== Visibility ==
The eclipse was completely visible over northeast Asia, North America, and northwestern South America, seen rising over much of South America, west Africa, and western Europe and setting over east Asia and Australia.

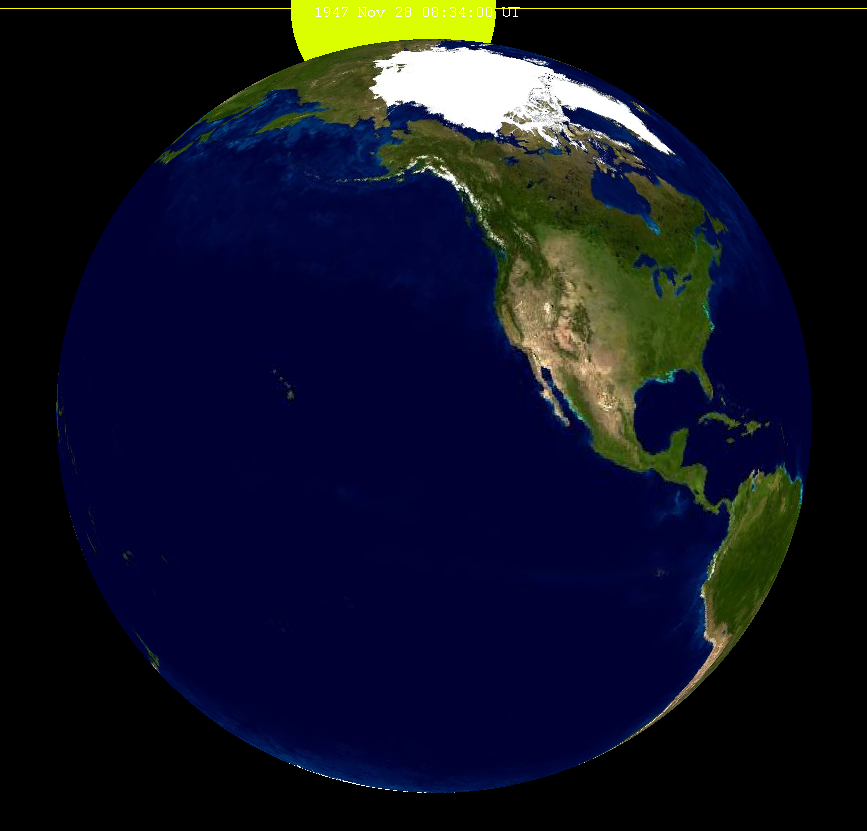
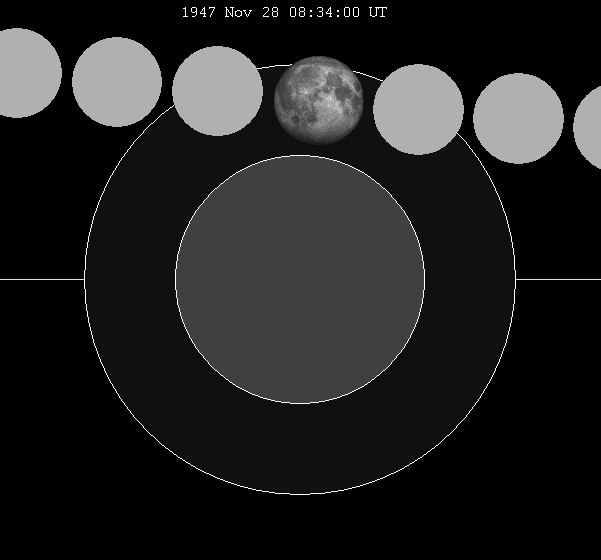

== Eclipse details ==
Shown below is a table displaying details about this particular lunar eclipse. It describes various parameters pertaining to this eclipse.

November 28, 1947 Lunar Eclipse Parameters
Parameter	Value
Penumbral Magnitude	0.86836
Umbral Magnitude	−0.12965
Gamma	1.08382
Sun Right Ascension	16h13m20.8s
Sun Declination	-21°11'10.8"
Sun Semi-Diameter	16'12.8"
Sun Equatorial Horizontal Parallax	08.9"
Moon Right Ascension	04h12m04.6s
Moon Declination	+22°13'19.6"
Moon Semi-Diameter	16'14.8"
Moon Equatorial Horizontal Parallax	0°59'37.4"
ΔT	28.2 s

== Eclipse season ==
This eclipse is part of an eclipse season, a period, roughly every six months, when eclipses occur. Only two (or occasionally three) eclipse seasons occur each year, and each season lasts about 35 days and repeats just short of six months (173 days) later; thus two full eclipse seasons always occur each year. Either two or three eclipses happen each eclipse season. In the sequence below, each eclipse is separated by a fortnight.

Eclipse season of November 1947
November 12 Descending node (new moon)	November 28 Ascending node (full moon)
Annular solar eclipse Solar Saros 132	Penumbral lunar eclipse Lunar Saros 144

== Related eclipses ==
=== Eclipses in 1947 ===
- A total solar eclipse on May 20.
- A partial lunar eclipse on June 3.
- An annular solar eclipse on November 12.
- A penumbral lunar eclipse on November 28.

=== Metonic ===
- Preceded by: Lunar eclipse of February 9, 1944
- Followed by: Lunar eclipse of September 15, 1951

=== Tzolkinex ===
- Preceded by: Lunar eclipse of October 16, 1940
- Followed by: Lunar eclipse of January 8, 1955

=== Half-Saros ===
- Preceded by: Solar eclipse of November 21, 1938
- Followed by: Solar eclipse of December 2, 1956

=== Tritos ===
- Preceded by: Lunar eclipse of December 28, 1936
- Followed by: Lunar eclipse of October 27, 1958

=== Lunar Saros 144 ===
- Preceded by: Lunar eclipse of November 17, 1929
- Followed by: Lunar eclipse of December 8, 1965

=== Inex ===
- Preceded by: Lunar eclipse of December 17, 1918
- Followed by: Lunar eclipse of November 6, 1976

=== Triad ===
- Preceded by: Lunar eclipse of January 26, 1861
- Followed by: Lunar eclipse of September 28, 2034

=== Lunar eclipses of 1944–1947 ===
This eclipse is a member of a semester series. An eclipse in a semester series of lunar eclipses repeats approximately every 177 days and 4 hours (a semester) at alternating nodes of the Moon's orbit.

The penumbral lunar eclipses on February 9, 1944 and August 4, 1944 occur in the previous lunar year eclipse set.

Lunar eclipse series sets from 1944 to 1947
Descending node				Ascending node			
Saros	Date Viewing	Type Chart	Gamma	Saros	Date Viewing	Type Chart	Gamma
109	1944 Jul 06	Penumbral	1.2597	114	1944 Dec 29	Penumbral	−1.0115
119	1945 Jun 25	Partial	0.5370	124	1945 Dec 19	Total	−0.2845
129	1946 Jun 14	Total	−0.2324	134	1946 Dec 08	Total	0.3864
139	1947 Jun 03	Partial	−0.9850	144	1947 Nov 28	Penumbral	1.0838

=== Saros 144 ===
This eclipse is a part of Saros series 144, repeating every 18 years, 11 days, and containing 71 events. The series started with a penumbral lunar eclipse on July 29, 1749. It contains partial eclipses from March 28, 2146 through June 23, 2290; total eclipses from July 4, 2308 through January 28, 2651; and a second set of partial eclipses from February 8, 2669 through June 8, 2867. The series ends at member 71 as a penumbral eclipse on September 4, 3011.

The longest duration of totality will be produced by member 38 at 104 minutes, 53 seconds on September 7, 2416. All eclipses in this series occur at the Moon’s ascending node of orbit.

Greatest	First			
The greatest eclipse of the series will occur on 2416 Sep 07, lasting 104 minutes, 53 seconds.	Penumbral	Partial	Total	Central
The greatest eclipse of the series will occur on 2416 Sep 07, lasting 104 minutes, 53 seconds.	1749 Jul 29	2146 Mar 28	2308 Jul 04	2362 Aug 06
The greatest eclipse of the series will occur on 2416 Sep 07, lasting 104 minutes, 53 seconds.	Last			
The greatest eclipse of the series will occur on 2416 Sep 07, lasting 104 minutes, 53 seconds.	Central	Total	Partial	Penumbral
The greatest eclipse of the series will occur on 2416 Sep 07, lasting 104 minutes, 53 seconds.	2488 Oct 20	2651 Jan 28	2867 Jun 08	3011 Sep 04

Eclipses are tabulated in three columns; every third eclipse in the same column is one exeligmos apart, so they all cast shadows over approximately the same parts of the Earth.

Series members 4–26 occur between 1801 and 2200:
4	5	6
1803 Sep 01	1821 Sep 11	1839 Sep 23
7	8	9
1857 Oct 03	1875 Oct 14	1893 Oct 25
10	11	12
1911 Nov 06	1929 Nov 17	1947 Nov 28
13	14	15
1965 Dec 08	1983 Dec 20	2001 Dec 30
16	17	18
2020 Jan 10	2038 Jan 21	2056 Feb 01
19	20	21
2074 Feb 11	2092 Feb 23	2110 Mar 06
22	23	24
2128 Mar 16	2146 Mar 28	2164 Apr 07
25	26	
2182 Apr 18	2200 Apr 30	

=== Tritos series ===
This eclipse is a part of a tritos cycle, repeating at alternating nodes every 135 synodic months (≈ 3986.63 days, or 11 years minus 1 month). Their appearance and longitude are irregular due to a lack of synchronization with the anomalistic month (period of perigee), but groupings of 3 tritos cycles (≈ 33 years minus 3 months) come close (≈ 434.044 anomalistic months), so eclipses are similar in these groupings.

Series members between 1801 and 2078
1806 Jan 05 (Saros 131)	1816 Dec 04 (Saros 132)	1827 Nov 03 (Saros 133)	1838 Oct 03 (Saros 134)	1849 Sep 02 (Saros 135)
1860 Aug 01 (Saros 136)	1871 Jul 02 (Saros 137)	1882 Jun 01 (Saros 138)	1893 Apr 30 (Saros 139)	1904 Mar 31 (Saros 140)
1915 Mar 01 (Saros 141)	1926 Jan 28 (Saros 142)	1936 Dec 28 (Saros 143)	1947 Nov 28 (Saros 144)	1958 Oct 27 (Saros 145)
1969 Sep 25 (Saros 146)	1980 Aug 26 (Saros 147)	1991 Jul 26 (Saros 148)	2002 Jun 24 (Saros 149)	2013 May 25 (Saros 150)
2078 Nov 19 (Saros 156)

=== Inex series ===
This eclipse is a part of the long period inex cycle, repeating at alternating nodes, every 358 synodic months (≈ 10,571.95 days, or 29 years minus 20 days). Their appearance and longitude are irregular due to a lack of synchronization with the anomalistic month (period of perigee). However, groupings of 3 inex cycles (≈ 87 years minus 2 months) comes close (≈ 1,151.02 anomalistic months), so eclipses are similar in these groupings.

Series members between 1801 and 2200
1803 Mar 08 (Saros 139)	1832 Feb 16 (Saros 140)	1861 Jan 26 (Saros 141)
1890 Jan 06 (Saros 142)	1918 Dec 17 (Saros 143)	1947 Nov 28 (Saros 144)
1976 Nov 06 (Saros 145)	2005 Oct 17 (Saros 146)	2034 Sep 28 (Saros 147)
2063 Sep 07 (Saros 148)	2092 Aug 17 (Saros 149)	2121 Jul 30 (Saros 150)
2150 Jul 09 (Saros 151)	2179 Jun 19 (Saros 152)	

=== Half-Saros cycle ===
A lunar eclipse will be preceded and followed by solar eclipses by 9 years and 5.5 days (a half saros). This lunar eclipse is related to two total solar eclipses of Solar Saros 151.

November 21, 1938	December 2, 1956

== See also ==
- List of lunar eclipses
- List of 20th-century lunar eclipses
