= December 1983 lunar eclipse =

Penumbral lunar eclipse December 20, 1983

- Penumbral eclipse
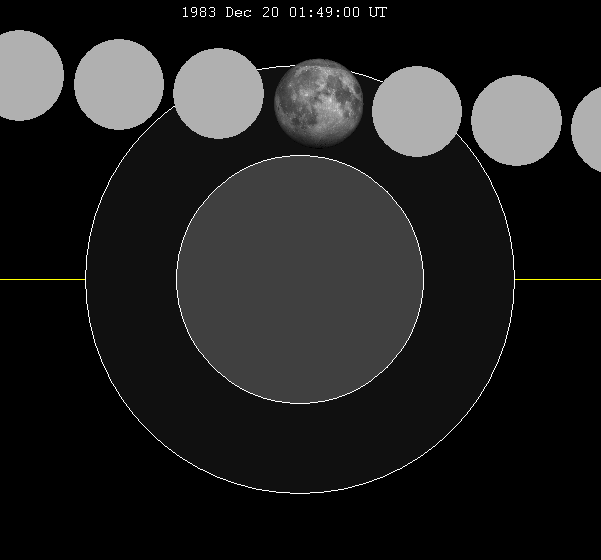
- The Moon's hourly motion shown right to left
- Date: December 20, 1983
- Gamma: 1.0747
- Magnitude: −0.1167
- Saros cycle: 144 (14 of 71)
- Penumbral: 242 minutes, 15 seconds
Contacts (UTC)
- P1: 23:47:59
- Greatest: 1:49:04
- P4: 3:50:14

A penumbral lunar eclipse occurred at the Moon’s ascending node of orbit on Tuesday, December 20, 1983, with an umbral magnitude of −0.1167. A lunar eclipse occurs when the Moon moves into the Earth's shadow, causing the Moon to be darkened. A penumbral lunar eclipse occurs when part or all of the Moon's near side passes into the Earth's penumbra. Unlike a solar eclipse, which can only be viewed from a relatively small area of the world, a lunar eclipse may be viewed from anywhere on the night side of Earth. Occurring about 2.7 days before perigee (on December 22, 1983, at 18:25 UTC), the Moon's apparent diameter was larger.

== Visibility ==
The eclipse was completely visible over much of North America, South America, Europe, much of Africa, and west and north Asia, seen rising over western North America and the eastern Pacific Ocean and setting over southeast Africa and central and south Asia.

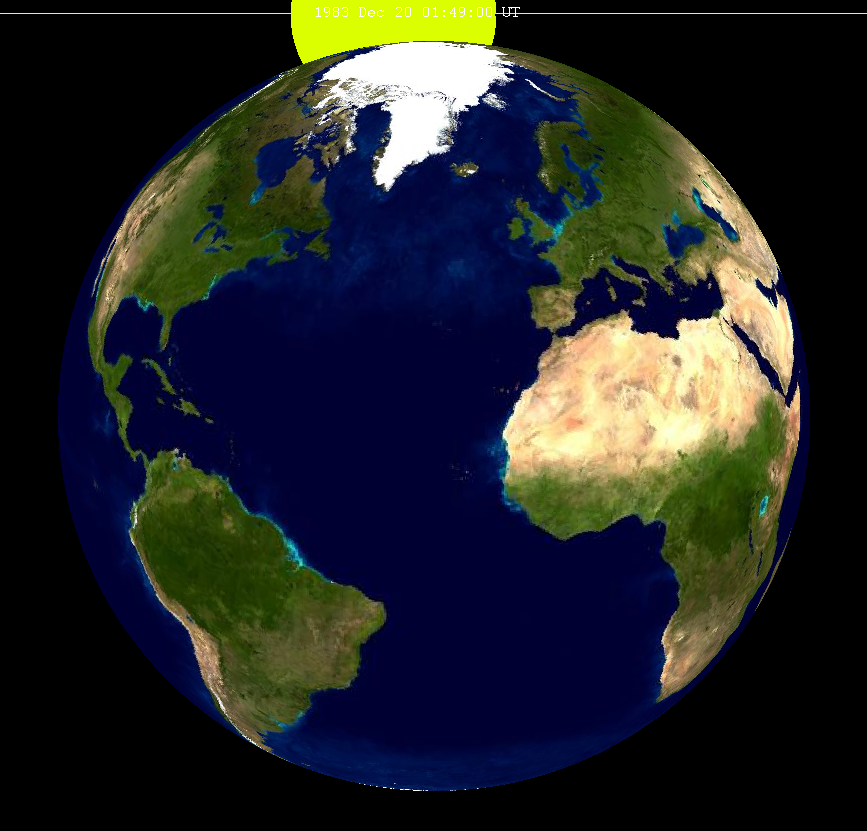
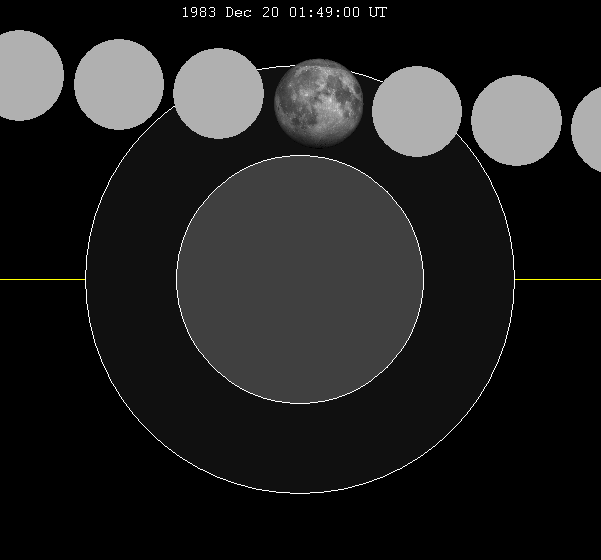

== Eclipse details ==
Shown below is a table displaying details about this particular lunar eclipse. It describes various parameters pertaining to this eclipse.

December 20, 1983 Lunar Eclipse Parameters
Parameter	Value
Penumbral Magnitude	0.88903
Umbral Magnitude	−0.11673
Gamma	1.07468
Sun Right Ascension	17h49m31.1s
Sun Declination	-23°25'11.7"
Sun Semi-Diameter	16'15.5"
Sun Equatorial Horizontal Parallax	08.9"
Moon Right Ascension	05h48m58.9s
Moon Declination	+24°28'31.2"
Moon Semi-Diameter	16'09.9"
Moon Equatorial Horizontal Parallax	0°59'19.5"
ΔT	53.7 s

== Eclipse season ==
This eclipse is part of an eclipse season, a period, roughly every six months, when eclipses occur. Only two (or occasionally three) eclipse seasons occur each year, and each season lasts about 35 days and repeats just short of six months (173 days) later; thus two full eclipse seasons always occur each year. Either two or three eclipses happen each eclipse season. In the sequence below, each eclipse is separated by a fortnight.

Eclipse season of December 1983
December 4 Descending node (new moon)	December 20 Ascending node (full moon)
Annular solar eclipse Solar Saros 132	Penumbral lunar eclipse Lunar Saros 144

== Related eclipses ==
=== Eclipses in 1983 ===
- A total solar eclipse on June 11.
- A partial lunar eclipse on June 25.
- An annular solar eclipse on December 4.
- A penumbral lunar eclipse on December 20.

=== Metonic ===
- Preceded by: Lunar eclipse of March 1, 1980
- Followed by: Lunar eclipse of October 7, 1987

=== Tzolkinex ===
- Preceded by: Lunar eclipse of November 6, 1976
- Followed by: Lunar eclipse of January 30, 1991

=== Half-Saros ===
- Preceded by: Solar eclipse of December 13, 1974
- Followed by: Solar eclipse of December 24, 1992

=== Tritos ===
- Preceded by: Lunar eclipse of January 18, 1973
- Followed by: Lunar eclipse of November 18, 1994

=== Lunar Saros 144 ===
- Preceded by: Lunar eclipse of December 8, 1965
- Followed by: Lunar eclipse of December 30, 2001

=== Inex ===
- Preceded by: Lunar eclipse of January 8, 1955
- Followed by: Lunar eclipse of November 28, 2012

=== Triad ===
- Preceded by: Lunar eclipse of February 17, 1897
- Followed by: Lunar eclipse of October 19, 2070

=== Lunar eclipses of 1980–1984 ===
This eclipse is a member of a semester series. An eclipse in a semester series of lunar eclipses repeats approximately every 177 days and 4 hours (a semester) at alternating nodes of the Moon's orbit.

The penumbral lunar eclipses on March 1, 1980 and August 26, 1980 occur in the previous lunar year eclipse set, and the penumbral lunar eclipses on May 15, 1984 and November 8, 1984 occur in the next lunar year eclipse set.

Lunar eclipse series sets from 1980 to 1984
Descending node				Ascending node			
Saros	Date Viewing	Type Chart	Gamma	Saros	Date Viewing	Type Chart	Gamma
109	1980 Jul 27	Penumbral	1.4139	114	1981 Jan 20	Penumbral	−1.0142
119	1981 Jul 17	Partial	0.7045	124	1982 Jan 09	Total	−0.2916
129	1982 Jul 06	Total	−0.0579	134	1982 Dec 30	Total	0.3758
139	1983 Jun 25	Partial	−0.8152	144	1983 Dec 20	Penumbral	1.0747
149	1984 Jun 13	Penumbral	−1.5240				

=== Saros 144 ===
This eclipse is a part of Saros series 144, repeating every 18 years, 11 days, and containing 71 events. The series started with a penumbral lunar eclipse on July 29, 1749. It contains partial eclipses from March 28, 2146 through June 23, 2290; total eclipses from July 4, 2308 through January 28, 2651; and a second set of partial eclipses from February 8, 2669 through June 8, 2867. The series ends at member 71 as a penumbral eclipse on September 4, 3011.

The longest duration of totality will be produced by member 38 at 104 minutes, 53 seconds on September 7, 2416. All eclipses in this series occur at the Moon’s ascending node of orbit.

Greatest	First			
The greatest eclipse of the series will occur on 2416 Sep 07, lasting 104 minutes, 53 seconds.	Penumbral	Partial	Total	Central
The greatest eclipse of the series will occur on 2416 Sep 07, lasting 104 minutes, 53 seconds.	1749 Jul 29	2146 Mar 28	2308 Jul 04	2362 Aug 06
The greatest eclipse of the series will occur on 2416 Sep 07, lasting 104 minutes, 53 seconds.	Last			
The greatest eclipse of the series will occur on 2416 Sep 07, lasting 104 minutes, 53 seconds.	Central	Total	Partial	Penumbral
The greatest eclipse of the series will occur on 2416 Sep 07, lasting 104 minutes, 53 seconds.	2488 Oct 20	2651 Jan 28	2867 Jun 08	3011 Sep 04

Eclipses are tabulated in three columns; every third eclipse in the same column is one exeligmos apart, so they all cast shadows over approximately the same parts of the Earth.

Series members 4–26 occur between 1801 and 2200:
4	5	6
1803 Sep 01	1821 Sep 11	1839 Sep 23
7	8	9
1857 Oct 03	1875 Oct 14	1893 Oct 25
10	11	12
1911 Nov 06	1929 Nov 17	1947 Nov 28
13	14	15
1965 Dec 08	1983 Dec 20	2001 Dec 30
16	17	18
2020 Jan 10	2038 Jan 21	2056 Feb 01
19	20	21
2074 Feb 11	2092 Feb 23	2110 Mar 06
22	23	24
2128 Mar 16	2146 Mar 28	2164 Apr 07
25	26	
2182 Apr 18	2200 Apr 30	

=== Tritos series ===
This eclipse is a part of a tritos cycle, repeating at alternating nodes every 135 synodic months (≈ 3986.63 days, or 11 years minus 1 month). Their appearance and longitude are irregular due to a lack of synchronization with the anomalistic month (period of perigee), but groupings of 3 tritos cycles (≈ 33 years minus 3 months) come close (≈ 434.044 anomalistic months), so eclipses are similar in these groupings.

Series members between 1801 and 2147
1809 Apr 30 (Saros 128)	1820 Mar 29 (Saros 129)	1831 Feb 26 (Saros 130)	1842 Jan 26 (Saros 131)	1852 Dec 26 (Saros 132)
1863 Nov 25 (Saros 133)	1874 Oct 25 (Saros 134)	1885 Sep 24 (Saros 135)	1896 Aug 23 (Saros 136)	1907 Jul 25 (Saros 137)
1918 Jun 24 (Saros 138)	1929 May 23 (Saros 139)	1940 Apr 22 (Saros 140)	1951 Mar 23 (Saros 141)	1962 Feb 19 (Saros 142)
1973 Jan 18 (Saros 143)	1983 Dec 20 (Saros 144)	1994 Nov 18 (Saros 145)	2005 Oct 17 (Saros 146)	2016 Sep 16 (Saros 147)
2027 Aug 17 (Saros 148)	2038 Jul 16 (Saros 149)	2049 Jun 15 (Saros 150)		
			2114 Dec 12 (Saros 156)	
	2147 Sep 09 (Saros 159)			

=== Inex series ===
This eclipse is a part of the long period inex cycle, repeating at alternating nodes, every 358 synodic months (≈ 10,571.95 days, or 29 years minus 20 days). Their appearance and longitude are irregular due to a lack of synchronization with the anomalistic month (period of perigee). However, groupings of 3 inex cycles (≈ 87 years minus 2 months) comes close (≈ 1,151.02 anomalistic months), so eclipses are similar in these groupings.

Series members between 1801 and 2200
1810 Apr 19 (Saros 138)	1839 Mar 30 (Saros 139)	1868 Mar 08 (Saros 140)
1897 Feb 17 (Saros 141)	1926 Jan 28 (Saros 142)	1955 Jan 08 (Saros 143)
1983 Dec 20 (Saros 144)	2012 Nov 28 (Saros 145)	2041 Nov 08 (Saros 146)
2070 Oct 19 (Saros 147)	2099 Sep 29 (Saros 148)	2128 Sep 09 (Saros 149)
2157 Aug 20 (Saros 150)	2186 Jul 31 (Saros 151)	

=== Half-Saros cycle ===
A lunar eclipse will be preceded and followed by solar eclipses by 9 years and 5.5 days (a half saros). This lunar eclipse is related to two partial solar eclipses of Solar Saros 151.

December 13, 1974	December 24, 1992

== See also ==
- List of lunar eclipses
- List of 20th-century lunar eclipses
