= January 2020 lunar eclipse =

Penumbral lunar eclipse in 2020

- Penumbral eclipse
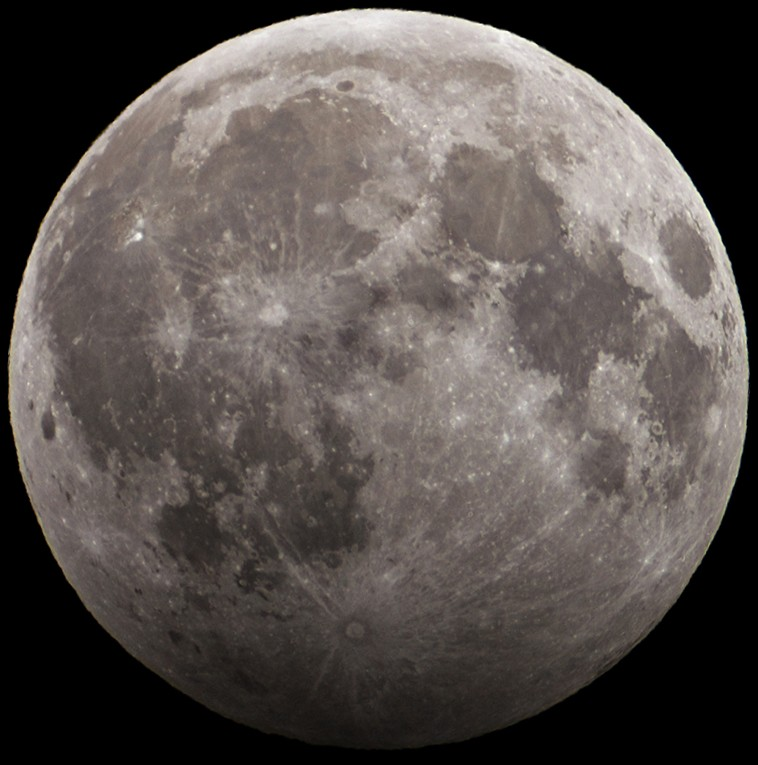
- Near greatest eclipse in Austria, 19:10 UTC
- Date: 10 January 2020
- Gamma: 1.0726
- Magnitude: −0.1146
- Saros cycle: 144 (16 of 71)
- Penumbral: 244 minutes, 34 seconds
Contacts (UTC)
- P1: 17:07:45
- Greatest: 19:09:59
- P4: 21:12:19

A penumbral lunar eclipse occurred at the Moon’s ascending node of orbit on Friday, 10 January 2020, with an umbral magnitude of −0.1146. A lunar eclipse occurs when the Moon moves into the Earth's shadow, causing the Moon to be darkened. A penumbral lunar eclipse occurs when part or all of the Moon's near side passes into the Earth's penumbra. Unlike a solar eclipse, which can only be viewed from a relatively small area of the world, a lunar eclipse may be viewed from anywhere on the night side of Earth. Occurring about 2.8 days before perigee (on 13 January 2020, at 15:20 UTC), the Moon's apparent diameter was larger.

This eclipse was the first of four penumbral lunar eclipses in 2020, with the others occurring on 5 June, 5 July, and 30 November.

== Visibility ==
The eclipse was completely visible over east Africa, Europe, and Asia, seen rising over the west Africa and northern North America and setting over Australia and the central Pacific Ocean.

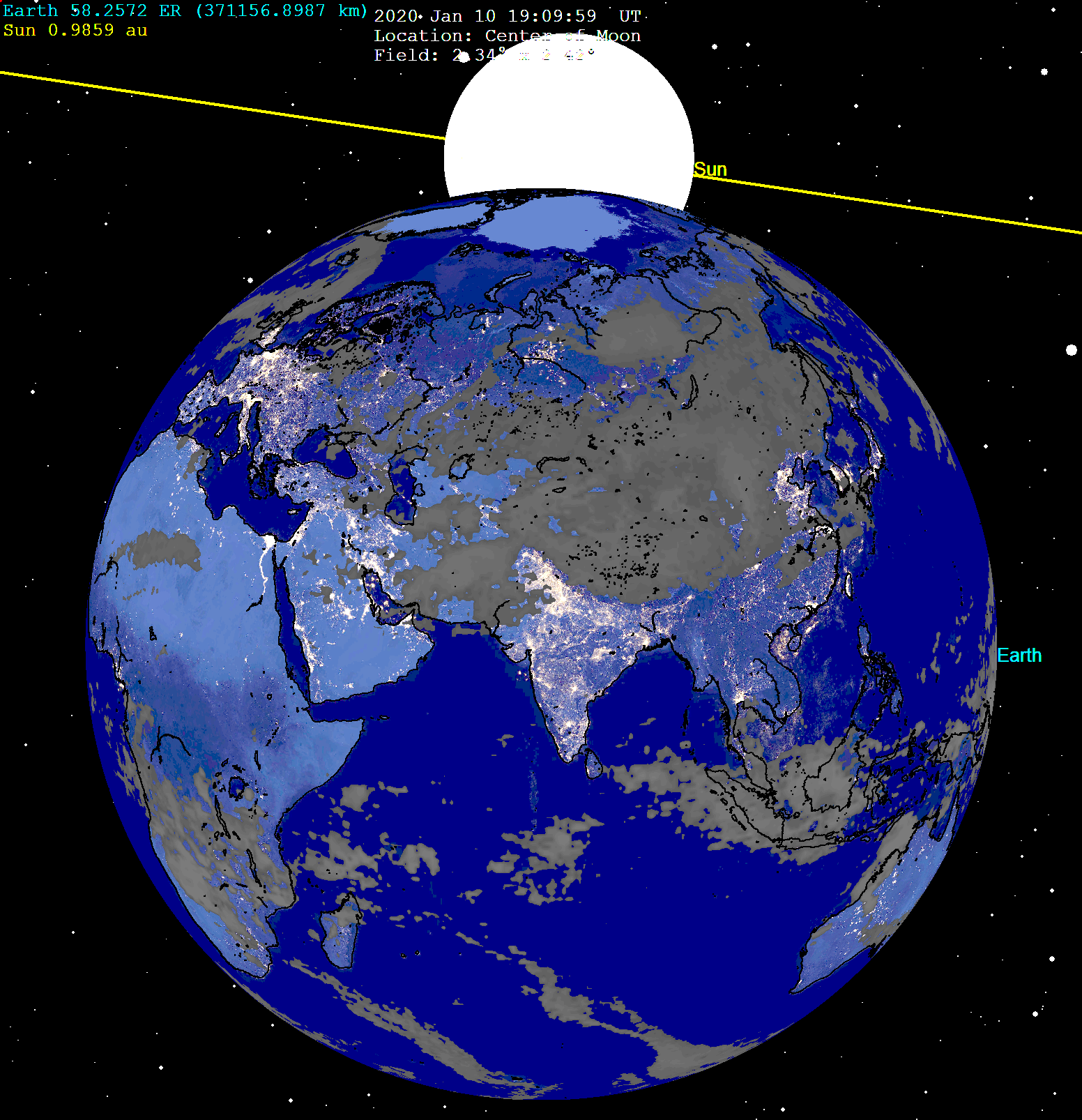
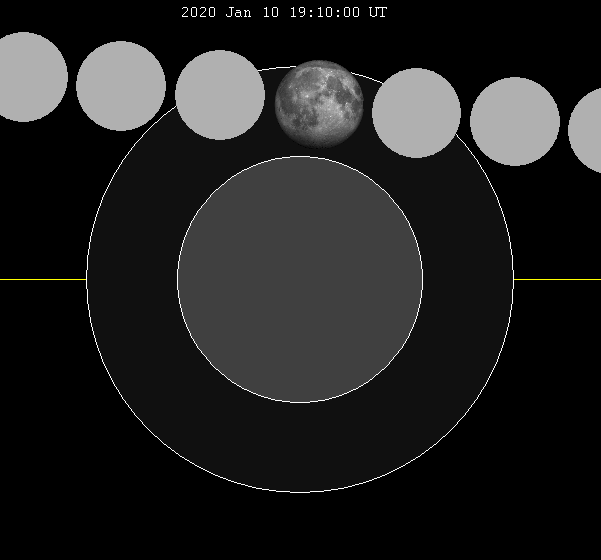
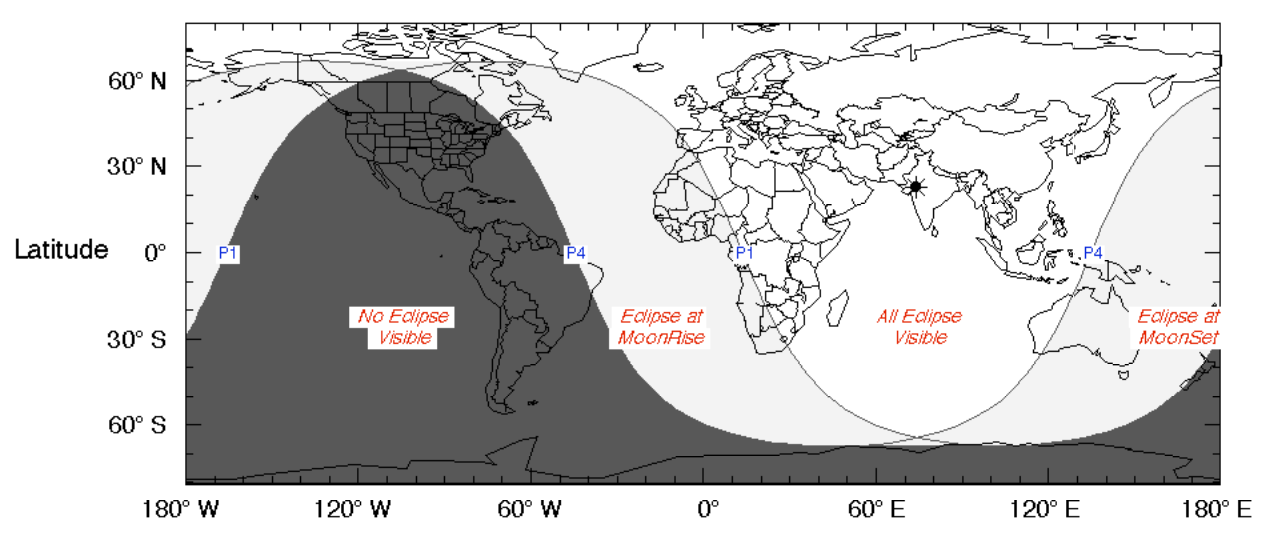
Visibility map

== Gallery ==
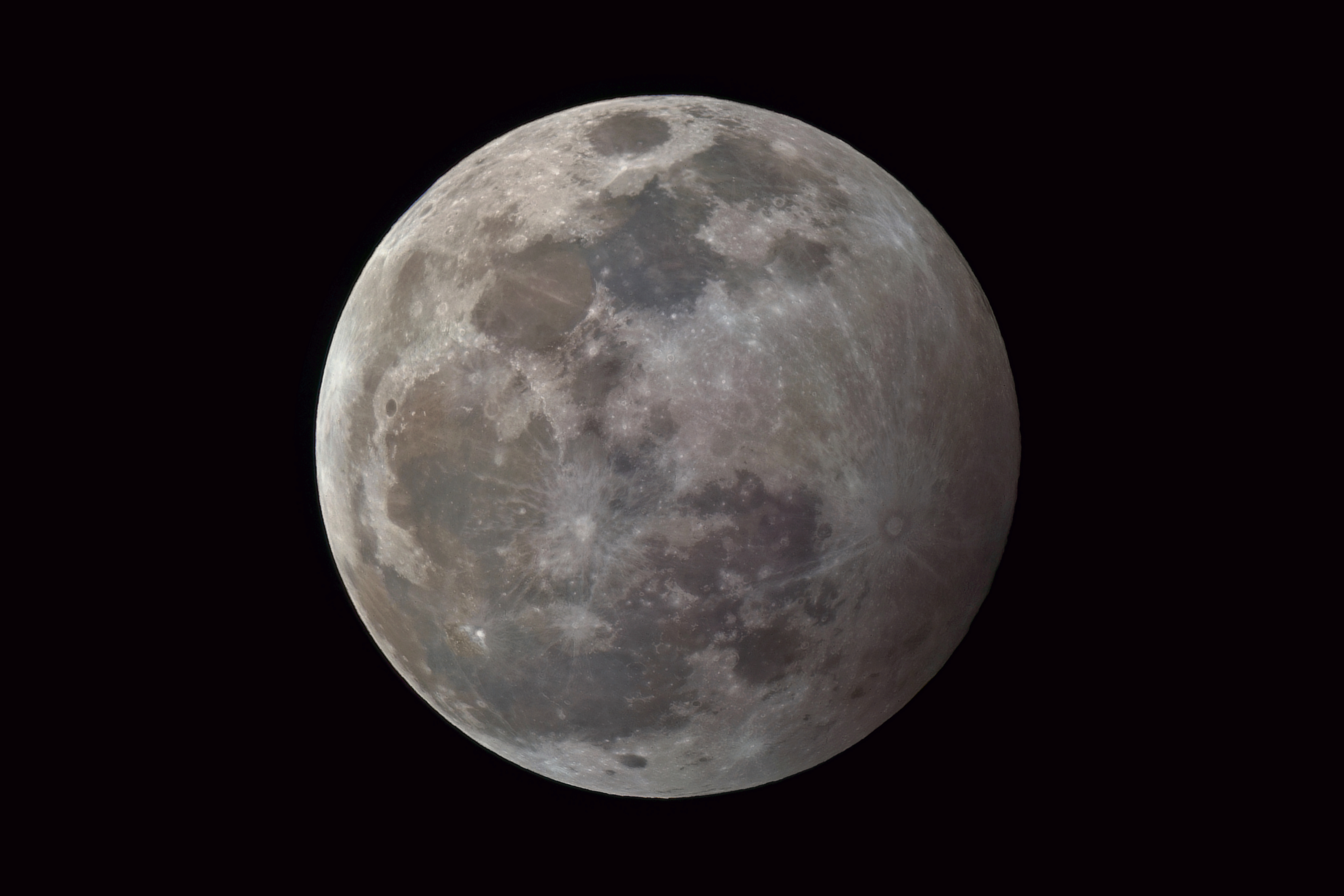
Oria, Italy, 18:09 UTC

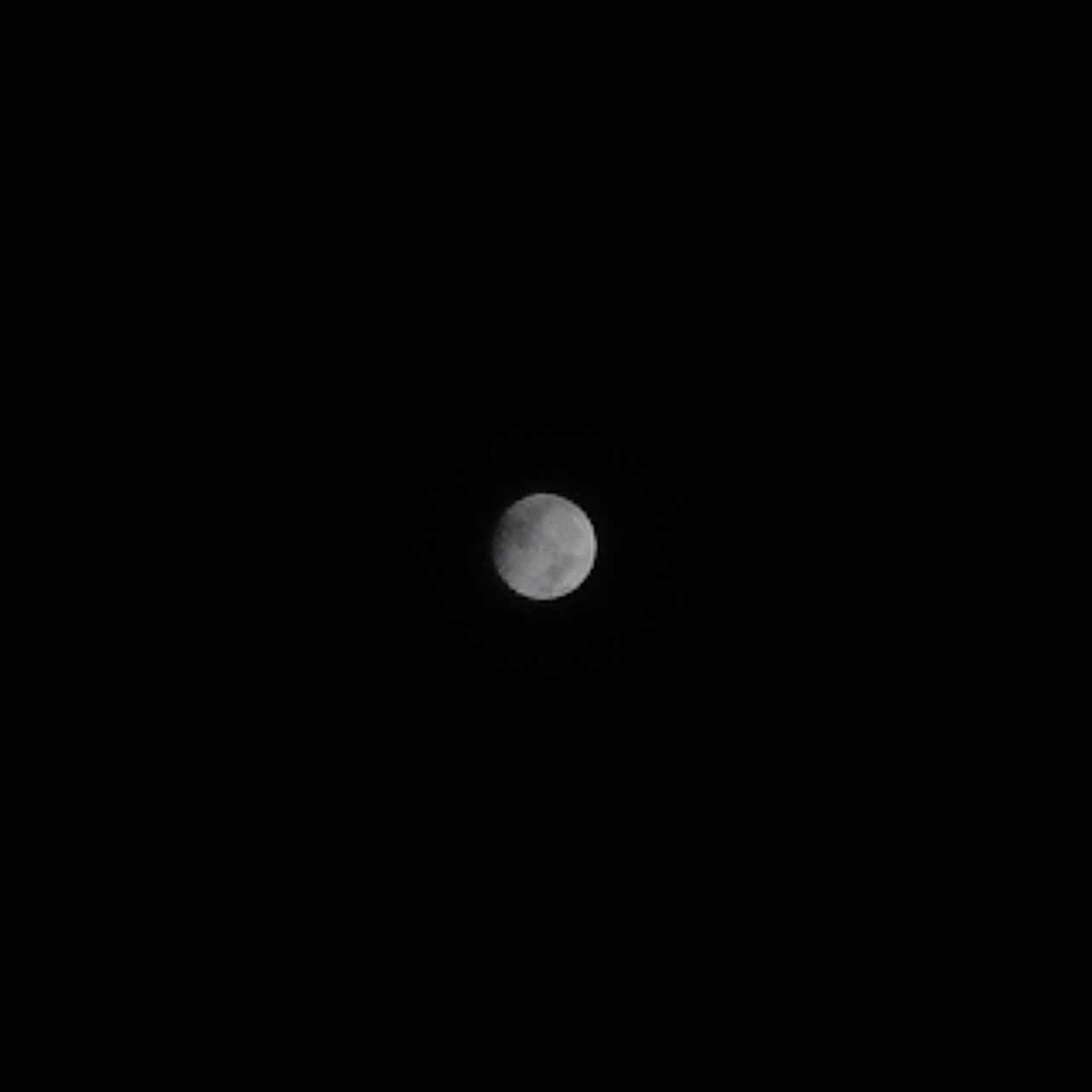
San Jose del Monte, Philippines, 18:47 UTC

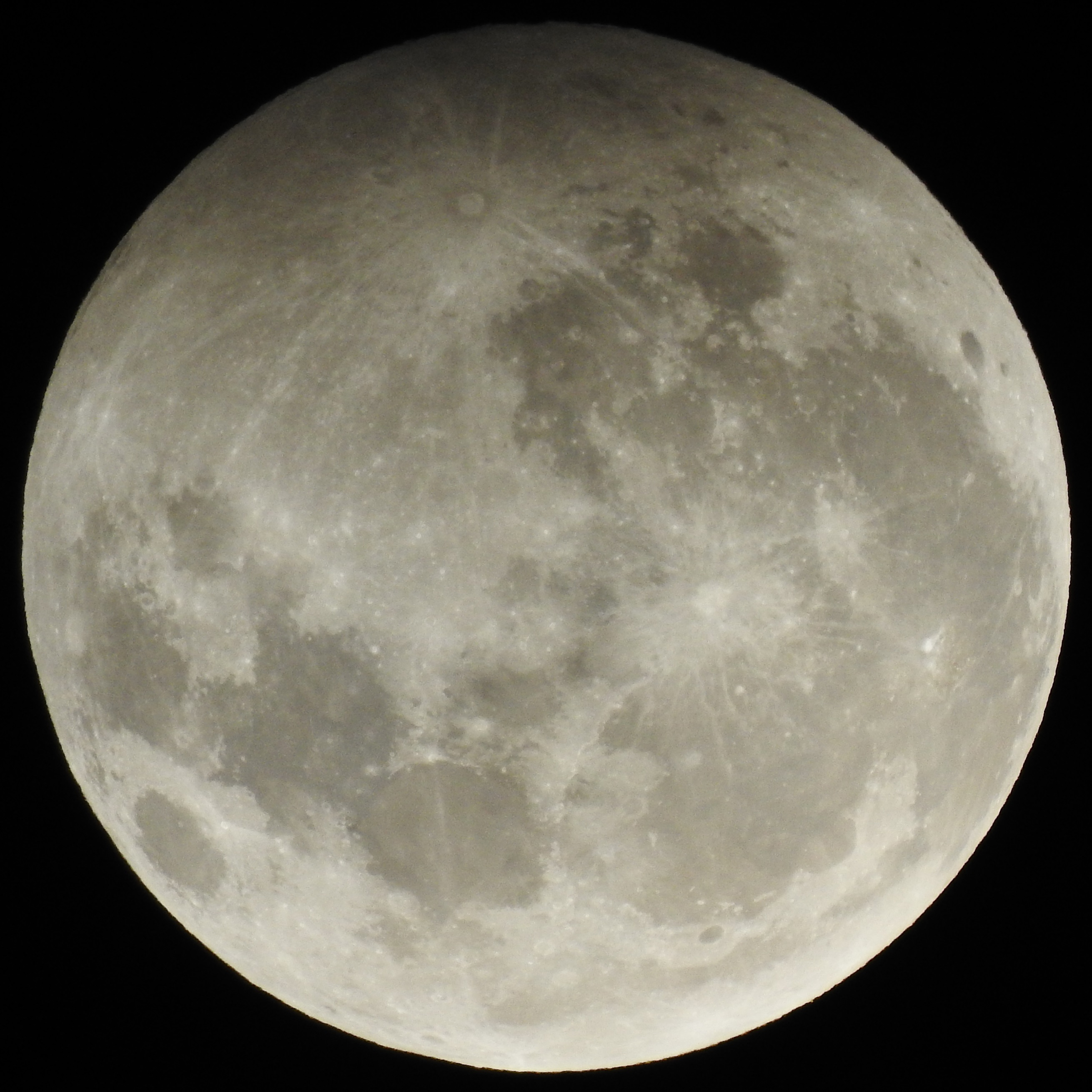
Colombo, Sri Lanka, 19:03 UTC

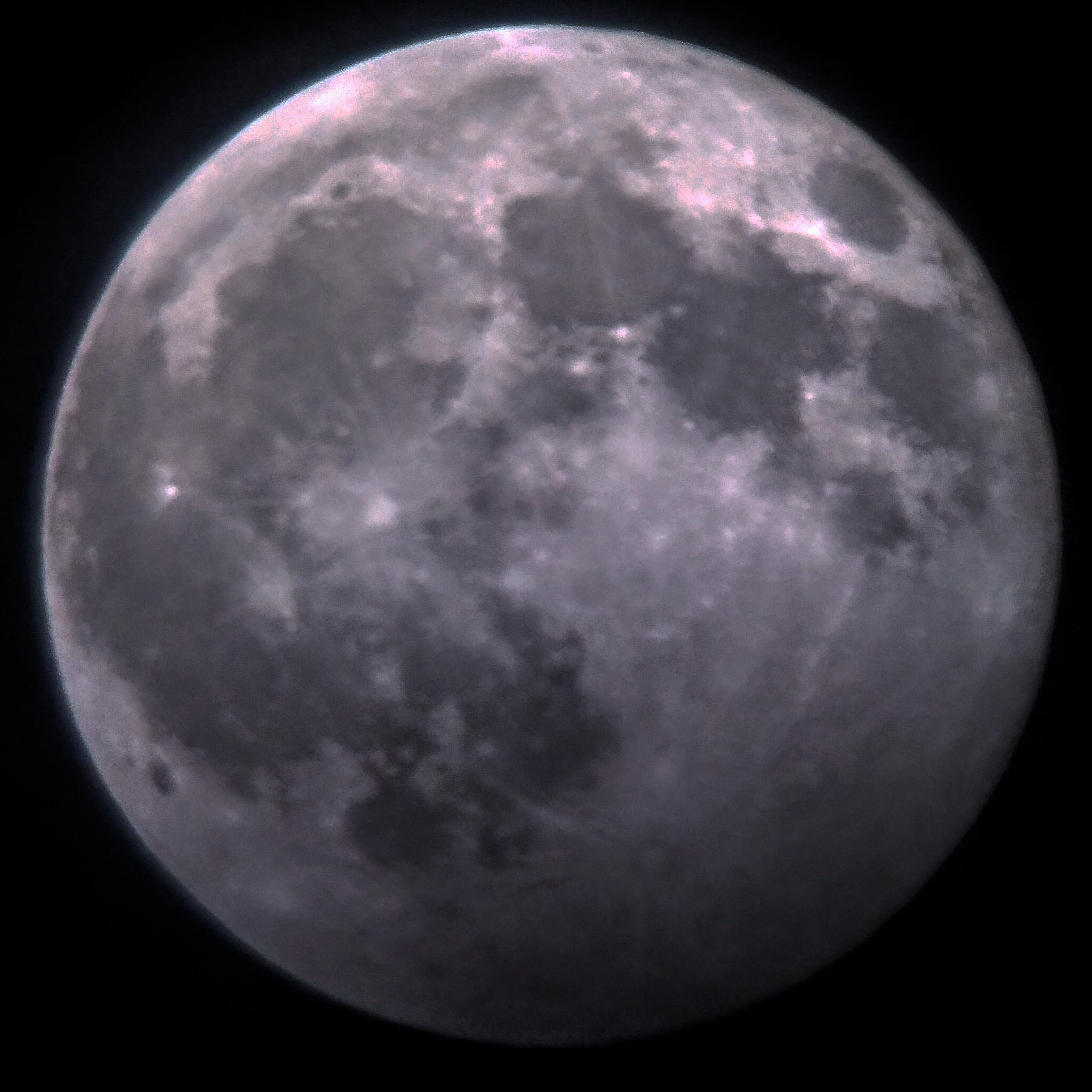
Ham, Belgium, 19:08 UTC

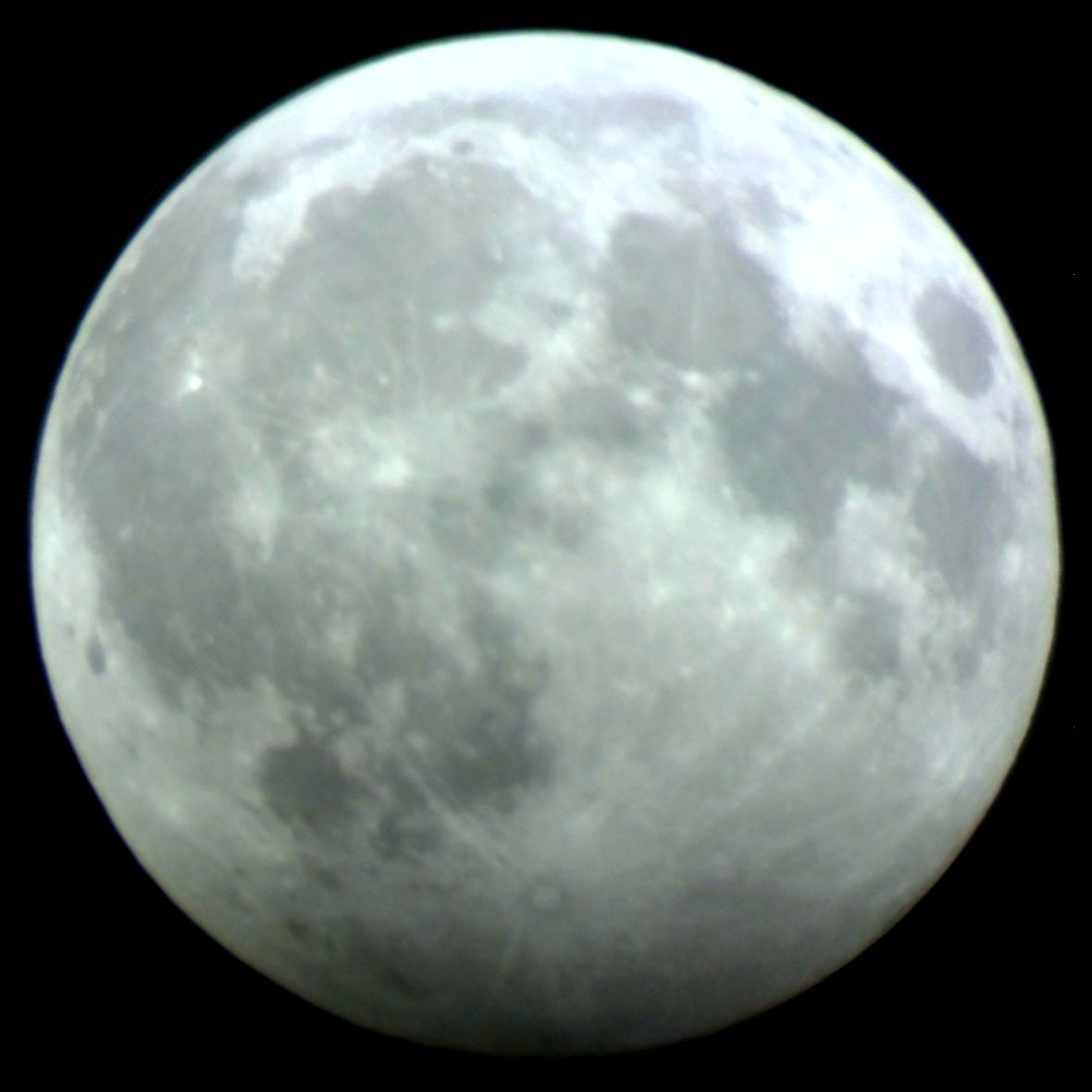
Tilehurst, England, 19:10 UTC

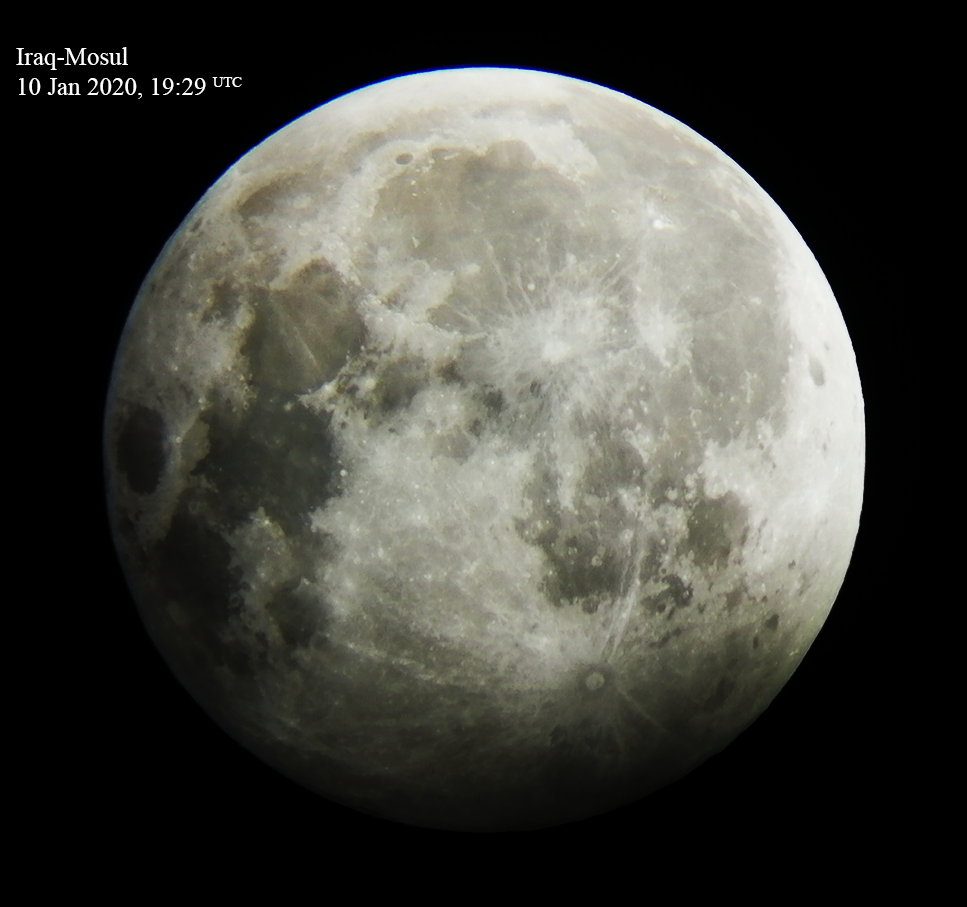
Mosul, Iraq, 19:29 UTC

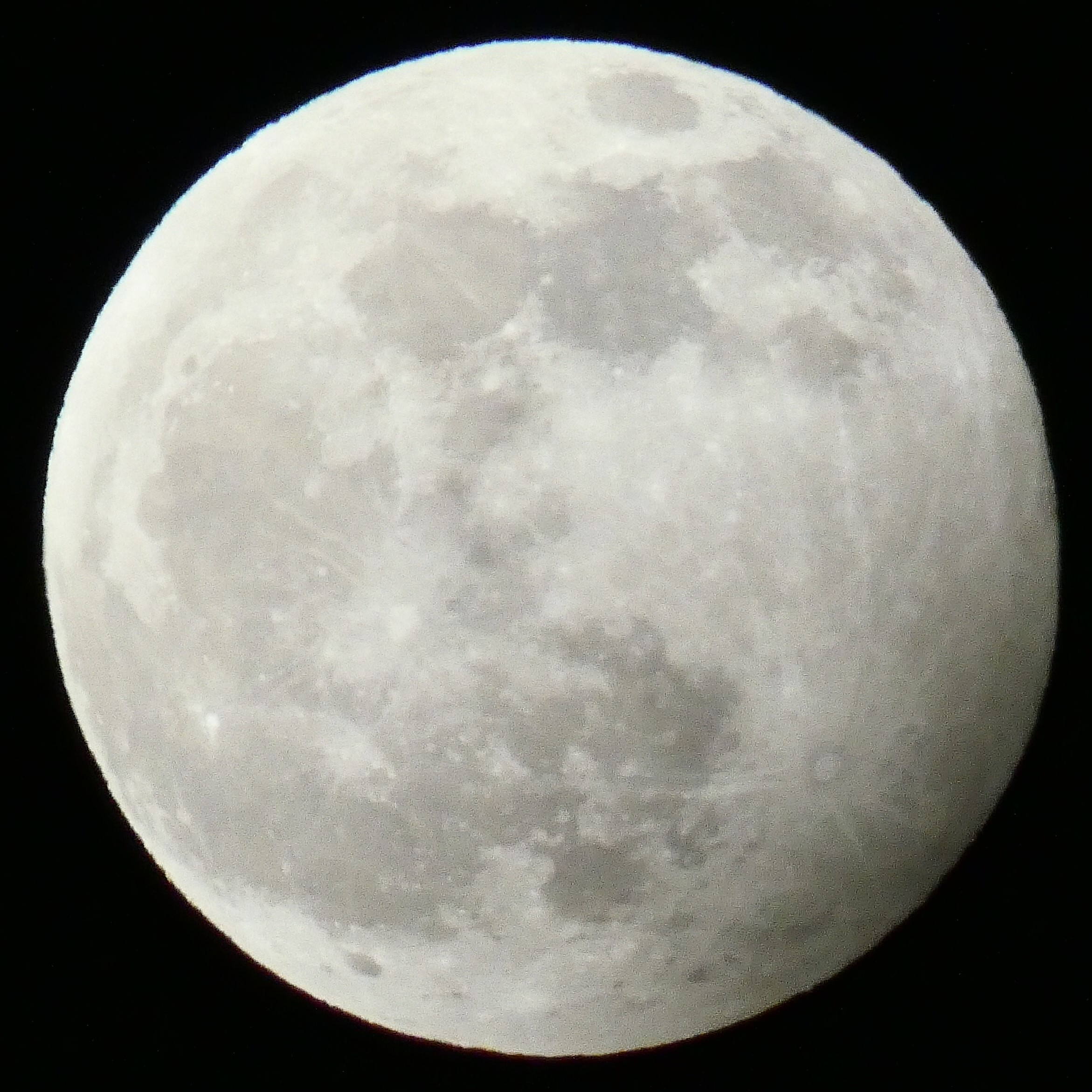
Pamplona, Spain, 20:19 UTC

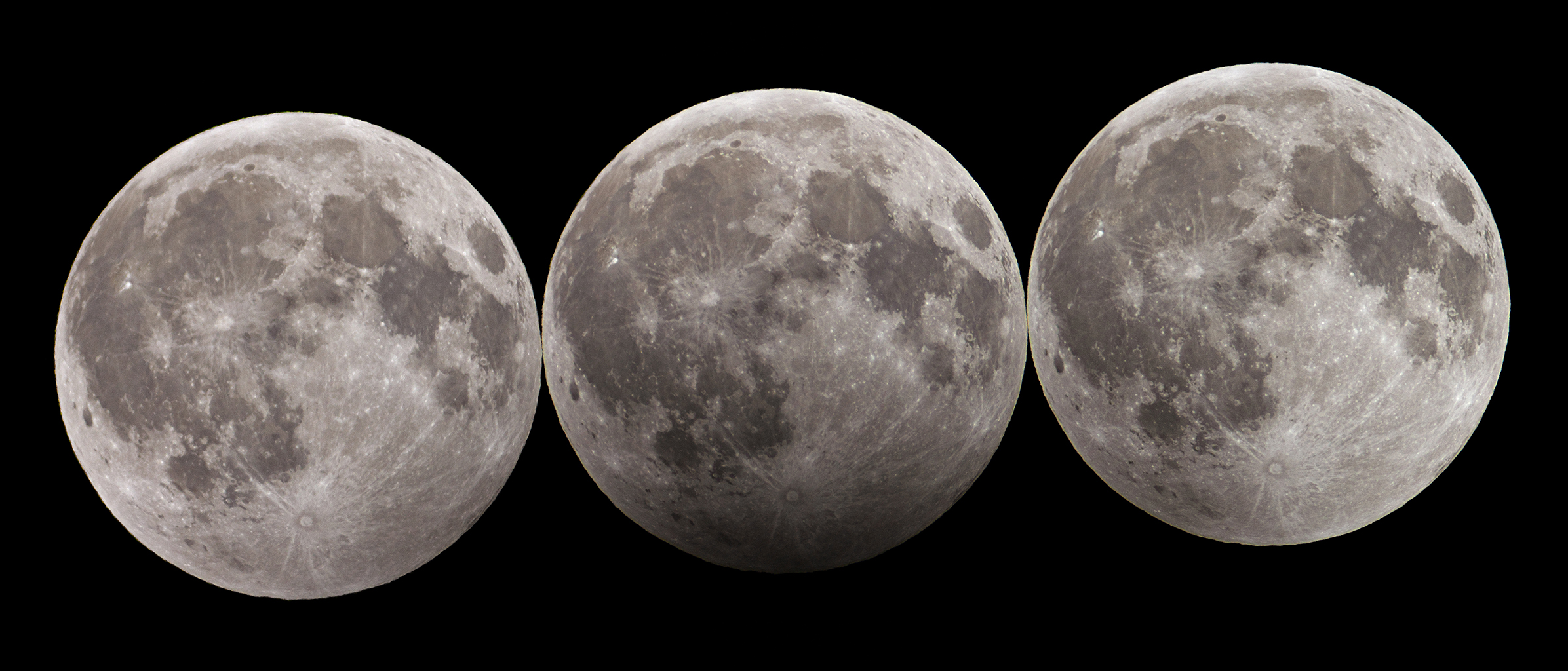
Eclipse sequence from Austria, 18:10–20:10 UTC

== Eclipse details ==
Shown below is a table displaying details about this particular solar eclipse. It describes various parameters pertaining to this eclipse.

10 January 2020 Lunar Eclipse Parameters
| Parameter | Value |
|---|---|
| Penumbral Magnitude | 0.89692 |
| Umbral Magnitude | −0.11460 |
| Gamma | 1.07270 |
| Sun Right Ascension | 19h26m32.0s |
| Sun Declination | -21°56'49.6" |
| Sun Semi-Diameter | 16'15.9" |
| Sun Equatorial Horizontal Parallax | 08.9" |
| Moon Right Ascension | 07h26m45.8s |
| Moon Declination | +23°00'02.8" |
| Moon Semi-Diameter | 16'04.8" |
| Moon Equatorial Horizontal Parallax | 0°59'00.8" |
| ΔT | 69.5 s |

== Eclipse season ==
This eclipse is part of an eclipse season, a period, roughly every six months, when eclipses occur. Only two (or occasionally three) eclipse seasons occur each year, and each season lasts about 35 days and repeats just short of six months (173 days) later; thus two full eclipse seasons always occur each year. Either two or three eclipses happen each eclipse season. In the sequence below, each eclipse is separated by a fortnight.

Eclipse season of December 2019–January 2020
| 26 December Descending node (new moon) | 10 January Ascending node (full moon) |
|---|---|
| Annular solar eclipse Solar Saros 132 | Penumbral lunar eclipse Lunar Saros 144 |

== Related eclipses ==
=== Eclipses in 2020 ===
- A penumbral lunar eclipse on 10 January.
- A penumbral lunar eclipse on June 5.
- An annular solar eclipse on June 21.
- A penumbral lunar eclipse on July 5.
- A penumbral lunar eclipse on November 30.
- A total solar eclipse on December 14.

=== Metonic ===
- Preceded by: Lunar eclipse of March 23, 2016
- Followed by: Lunar eclipse of October 28, 2023

=== Tzolkinex ===
- Preceded by: Lunar eclipse of November 28, 2012
- Followed by: Lunar eclipse of February 20, 2027

=== Half-Saros ===
- Preceded by: Solar eclipse of January 4, 2011
- Followed by: Solar eclipse of January 14, 2029

=== Tritos ===
- Preceded by: Lunar eclipse of February 9, 2009
- Followed by: Lunar eclipse of December 9, 2030

=== Lunar Saros 144 ===
- Preceded by: Lunar eclipse of December 30, 2001
- Followed by: Lunar eclipse of January 21, 2038

=== Inex ===
- Preceded by: Lunar eclipse of January 30, 1991
- Followed by: Lunar eclipse of December 20, 2048

=== Triad ===
- Preceded by: Lunar eclipse of March 12, 1933
- Followed by: Lunar eclipse of November 11, 2106

=== Lunar eclipses of 2016–2020 ===
This eclipse is a member of a semester series. An eclipse in a semester series of lunar eclipses repeats approximately every 177 days and 4 hours (a semester) at alternating nodes of the Moon's orbit.

The penumbral lunar eclipses on March 23, 2016 and September 16, 2016 occur in the previous lunar year eclipse set, and the penumbral lunar eclipses on June 5, 2020 and November 30, 2020 occur in the next lunar year eclipse set.

Lunar eclipse series sets from 2016 to 2020
| Descending node | | | | Ascending node | | | |
| Saros | Date Viewing | Type Chart | Gamma | Saros | Date Viewing | Type Chart | Gamma |
| 109 | 2016 Aug 18 | Penumbral | 1.5641 | 114 | 2017 Feb 11 | Penumbral | −1.0255 |
| 119 | 2017 Aug 07 | Partial | 0.8669 | 124 | 2018 Jan 31 | Total | −0.3014 |
| 129 | 2018 Jul 27 | Total | 0.1168 | 134 | 2019 Jan 21 | Total | 0.3684 |
| 139 | 2019 Jul 16 | Partial | −0.6430 | 144 | 2020 Jan 10 | Penumbral | 1.0727 |
| 149 | 2020 Jul 05 | Penumbral | −1.3639 | | | | |

=== Saros 144 ===
This eclipse is a part of Saros series 144, repeating every 18 years, 11 days, and containing 71 events. The series started with a penumbral lunar eclipse on July 29, 1749. It contains partial eclipses from March 28, 2146 through June 23, 2290; total eclipses from July 4, 2308 through January 28, 2651; and a second set of partial eclipses from February 8, 2669 through June 8, 2867. The series ends at member 71 as a penumbral eclipse on September 4, 3011.

The longest duration of totality will be produced by member 38 at 104 minutes, 53 seconds on September 7, 2416. All eclipses in this series occur at the Moon’s ascending node of orbit.

| Greatest | First | | | |
|---|---|---|---|---|
| The greatest eclipse of the series will occur on 2416 Sep 07, lasting 104 minutes, 53 seconds. | Penumbral | Partial | Total | Central |
| The greatest eclipse of the series will occur on 2416 Sep 07, lasting 104 minutes, 53 seconds. | 1749 Jul 29 | 2146 Mar 28 | 2308 Jul 04 | 2362 Aug 06 |
| The greatest eclipse of the series will occur on 2416 Sep 07, lasting 104 minutes, 53 seconds. | Last | | | |
| The greatest eclipse of the series will occur on 2416 Sep 07, lasting 104 minutes, 53 seconds. | Central | Total | Partial | Penumbral |
| The greatest eclipse of the series will occur on 2416 Sep 07, lasting 104 minutes, 53 seconds. | 2488 Oct 20 | 2651 Jan 28 | 2867 Jun 08 | 3011 Sep 04 |

Eclipses are tabulated in three columns; every third eclipse in the same column is one exeligmos apart, so they all cast shadows over approximately the same parts of the Earth.

Series members 4–26 occur between 1801 and 2200:
| 4 | 5 | 6 |
|---|---|---|
| 1803 Sep 01 | 1821 Sep 11 | 1839 Sep 23 |
| 7 | 8 | 9 |
| 1857 Oct 03 | 1875 Oct 14 | 1893 Oct 25 |
| 10 | 11 | 12 |
| 1911 Nov 06 | 1929 Nov 17 | 1947 Nov 28 |
| 13 | 14 | 15 |
| 1965 Dec 08 | 1983 Dec 20 | 2001 Dec 30 |
| 16 | 17 | 18 |
| 2020 Jan 10 | 2038 Jan 21 | 2056 Feb 01 |
| 19 | 20 | 21 |
| 2074 Feb 11 | 2092 Feb 23 | 2110 Mar 06 |
| 22 | 23 | 24 |
| 2128 Mar 16 | 2146 Mar 28 | 2164 Apr 07 |
| 25 | 26 | |
| 2182 Apr 18 | 2200 Apr 30 | |

=== Tritos series ===
This eclipse is a part of a tritos cycle, repeating at alternating nodes every 135 synodic months (≈ 3986.63 days, or 11 years minus 1 month). Their appearance and longitude are irregular due to a lack of synchronization with the anomalistic month (period of perigee), but groupings of 3 tritos cycles (≈ 33 years minus 3 months) come close (≈ 434.044 anomalistic months), so eclipses are similar in these groupings.

Series members between 1801 and 2183
| 1801 Sep 22 (Saros 124) | 1812 Aug 22 (Saros 125) | 1823 Jul 23 (Saros 126) | 1834 Jun 21 (Saros 127) | 1845 May 21 (Saros 128) |
| 1856 Apr 20 (Saros 129) | 1867 Mar 20 (Saros 130) | 1878 Feb 17 (Saros 131) | 1889 Jan 17 (Saros 132) | 1899 Dec 17 (Saros 133) |
| 1910 Nov 17 (Saros 134) | 1921 Oct 16 (Saros 135) | 1932 Sep 14 (Saros 136) | 1943 Aug 15 (Saros 137) | 1954 Jul 16 (Saros 138) |
| 1965 Jun 14 (Saros 139) | 1976 May 13 (Saros 140) | 1987 Apr 14 (Saros 141) | 1998 Mar 13 (Saros 142) | 2009 Feb 09 (Saros 143) |
| 2020 Jan 10 (Saros 144) | 2030 Dec 09 (Saros 145) | 2041 Nov 08 (Saros 146) | 2052 Oct 08 (Saros 147) | 2063 Sep 07 (Saros 148) |
| 2074 Aug 07 (Saros 149) | 2085 Jul 07 (Saros 150) | 2096 Jun 06 (Saros 151) | 2107 May 07 (Saros 152) | |
| | | 2151 Jan 02 (Saros 156) | | 2172 Oct 31 (Saros 158) |
2183 Oct 01 (Saros 159)

=== Inex series ===
This eclipse is a part of the long period inex cycle, repeating at alternating nodes, every 358 synodic months (≈ 10,571.95 days, or 29 years minus 20 days). Their appearance and longitude are irregular due to a lack of synchronization with the anomalistic month (period of perigee). However, groupings of 3 inex cycles (≈ 87 years minus 2 months) comes close (≈ 1,151.02 anomalistic months), so eclipses are similar in these groupings.

Series members between 1801 and 2200
| 1817 May 30 (Saros 137) | 1846 May 11 (Saros 138) | 1875 Apr 20 (Saros 139) |
| 1904 Mar 31 (Saros 140) | 1933 Mar 12 (Saros 141) | 1962 Feb 19 (Saros 142) |
| 1991 Jan 30 (Saros 143) | 2020 Jan 10 (Saros 144) | 2048 Dec 20 (Saros 145) |
| 2077 Nov 29 (Saros 146) | 2106 Nov 11 (Saros 147) | 2135 Oct 22 (Saros 148) |
| 2164 Sep 30 (Saros 149) | 2193 Sep 11 (Saros 150) | |

=== Half-Saros cycle ===
A lunar eclipse will be preceded and followed by solar eclipses by 9 years and 5.5 days (a half saros). This lunar eclipse is related to two partial solar eclipses of Solar Saros 151.

| January 4, 2011 | January 14, 2029 |

== See also ==
- List of lunar eclipses and List of 21st-century lunar eclipses
