= December 1965 lunar eclipse =

Penumbral lunar eclipse December 8, 1965

- Penumbral eclipse
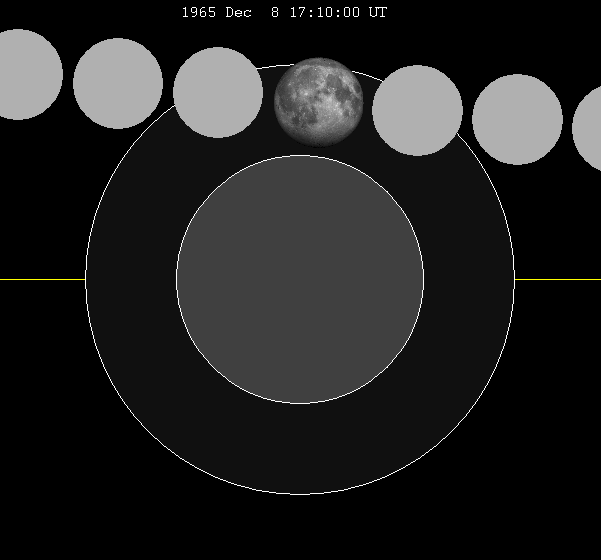
- The Moon's hourly motion shown right to left
- Date: December 8, 1965
- Gamma: 1.0775
- Magnitude: −0.1200
- Saros cycle: 144 (13 of 71)
- Penumbral: 240 minutes, 40 seconds
Contacts (UTC)
- P1: 15:09:39
- Greatest: 17:09:55
- P4: 19:10:19

A penumbral lunar eclipse occurred at the Moon’s ascending node of orbit on Wednesday, December 8, 1965, with an umbral magnitude of −0.1200. A lunar eclipse occurs when the Moon moves into the Earth's shadow, causing the Moon to be darkened. A penumbral lunar eclipse occurs when part or all of the Moon's near side passes into the Earth's penumbra. Unlike a solar eclipse, which can only be viewed from a relatively small area of the world, a lunar eclipse may be viewed from anywhere on the night side of Earth. Occurring about 2.5 days before perigee (on December 11, 1965, at 6:00 UTC), the Moon's apparent diameter was larger.

== Visibility ==
The eclipse was completely visible over eastern Europe, northeast Africa, Asia, and Australia, seen rising over western Europe and much of Africa and setting over northwestern North America and the central Pacific Ocean.

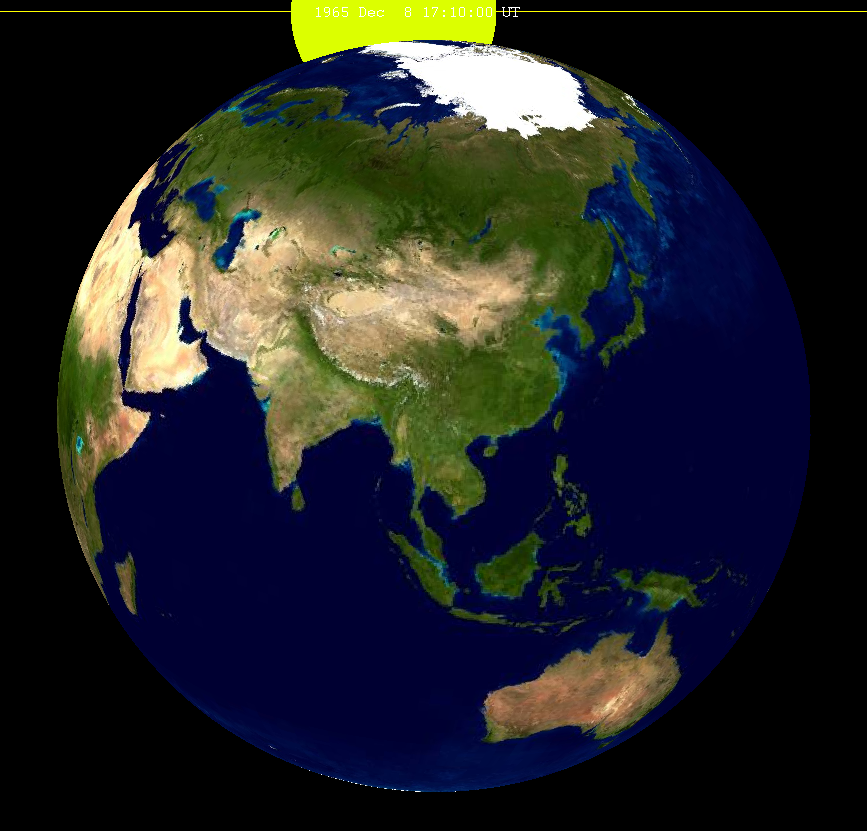
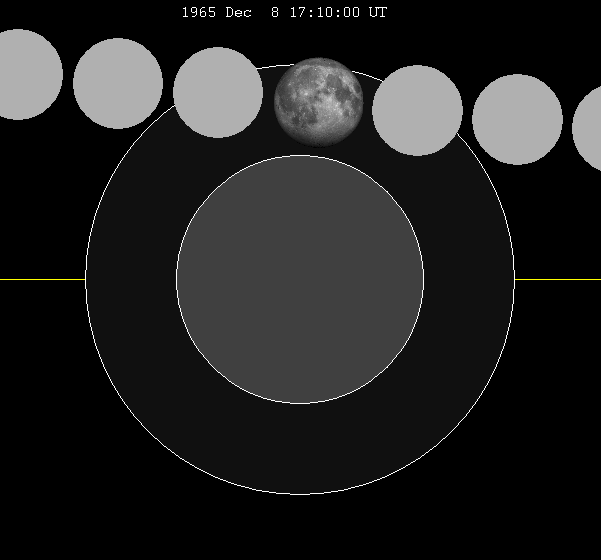

== Eclipse details ==
Shown below is a table displaying details about this particular lunar eclipse. It describes various parameters pertaining to this eclipse.

December 8, 1965 Lunar Eclipse Parameters
Parameter	Value
Penumbral Magnitude	0.88203
Umbral Magnitude	−0.12004
Gamma	1.07748
Sun Right Ascension	17h00m58.1s
Sun Declination	-22°45'04.3"
Sun Semi-Diameter	16'14.4"
Sun Equatorial Horizontal Parallax	08.9"
Moon Right Ascension	05h00m02.9s
Moon Declination	+23°47'53.1"
Moon Semi-Diameter	16'12.3"
Moon Equatorial Horizontal Parallax	0°59'28.5"
ΔT	36.5 s

== Eclipse season ==
This eclipse is part of an eclipse season, a period, roughly every six months, when eclipses occur. Only two (or occasionally three) eclipse seasons occur each year, and each season lasts about 35 days and repeats just short of six months (173 days) later; thus two full eclipse seasons always occur each year. Either two or three eclipses happen each eclipse season. In the sequence below, each eclipse is separated by a fortnight.

Eclipse season of November–December 1965
November 23 Descending node (new moon)	December 8 Ascending node (full moon)
Annular solar eclipse Solar Saros 132	Penumbral lunar eclipse Lunar Saros 144

== Related eclipses ==
=== Eclipses in 1965 ===
- A total solar eclipse on May 30.
- A partial lunar eclipse on June 14.
- An annular solar eclipse on November 23.
- A penumbral lunar eclipse on December 8.

=== Metonic ===
- Preceded by: Lunar eclipse of February 19, 1962
- Followed by: Lunar eclipse of September 25, 1969

=== Tzolkinex ===
- Preceded by: Lunar eclipse of October 27, 1958
- Followed by: Lunar eclipse of January 18, 1973

=== Half-Saros ===
- Preceded by: Solar eclipse of December 2, 1956
- Followed by: Solar eclipse of December 13, 1974

=== Tritos ===
- Preceded by: Lunar eclipse of January 8, 1955
- Followed by: Lunar eclipse of November 6, 1976

=== Lunar Saros 144 ===
- Preceded by: Lunar eclipse of November 28, 1947
- Followed by: Lunar eclipse of December 20, 1983

=== Inex ===
- Preceded by: Lunar eclipse of December 28, 1936
- Followed by: Lunar eclipse of November 18, 1994

=== Triad ===
- Preceded by: Lunar eclipse of February 7, 1879
- Followed by: Lunar eclipse of October 8, 2052

=== Lunar eclipses of 1962–1965 ===
This eclipse is a member of a semester series. An eclipse in a semester series of lunar eclipses repeats approximately every 177 days and 4 hours (a semester) at alternating nodes of the Moon's orbit.

The penumbral lunar eclipses on February 19, 1962 and August 15, 1962 occur in the previous lunar year eclipse set.

Lunar eclipse series sets from 1962 to 1965
Descending node				Ascending node			
Saros	Date Viewing	Type Chart	Gamma	Saros	Date Viewing	Type Chart	Gamma
109	1962 Jul 17	Penumbral	1.3371	114	1963 Jan 09	Penumbral	−1.0128
119	1963 Jul 06	Partial	0.6197	124	1963 Dec 30	Total	−0.2889
129	1964 Jun 25	Total	−0.1461	134	1964 Dec 19	Total	0.3801
139	1965 Jun 14	Partial	−0.9006	144	1965 Dec 08	Penumbral	1.0775

=== Saros 144 ===
This eclipse is a part of Saros series 144, repeating every 18 years, 11 days, and containing 71 events. The series started with a penumbral lunar eclipse on July 29, 1749. It contains partial eclipses from March 28, 2146 through June 23, 2290; total eclipses from July 4, 2308 through January 28, 2651; and a second set of partial eclipses from February 8, 2669 through June 8, 2867. The series ends at member 71 as a penumbral eclipse on September 4, 3011.

The longest duration of totality will be produced by member 38 at 104 minutes, 53 seconds on September 7, 2416. All eclipses in this series occur at the Moon’s ascending node of orbit.

Greatest	First			
The greatest eclipse of the series will occur on 2416 Sep 07, lasting 104 minutes, 53 seconds.	Penumbral	Partial	Total	Central
The greatest eclipse of the series will occur on 2416 Sep 07, lasting 104 minutes, 53 seconds.	1749 Jul 29	2146 Mar 28	2308 Jul 04	2362 Aug 06
The greatest eclipse of the series will occur on 2416 Sep 07, lasting 104 minutes, 53 seconds.	Last			
The greatest eclipse of the series will occur on 2416 Sep 07, lasting 104 minutes, 53 seconds.	Central	Total	Partial	Penumbral
The greatest eclipse of the series will occur on 2416 Sep 07, lasting 104 minutes, 53 seconds.	2488 Oct 20	2651 Jan 28	2867 Jun 08	3011 Sep 04

Eclipses are tabulated in three columns; every third eclipse in the same column is one exeligmos apart, so they all cast shadows over approximately the same parts of the Earth.

Series members 4–26 occur between 1801 and 2200:
4	5	6
1803 Sep 01	1821 Sep 11	1839 Sep 23
7	8	9
1857 Oct 03	1875 Oct 14	1893 Oct 25
10	11	12
1911 Nov 06	1929 Nov 17	1947 Nov 28
13	14	15
1965 Dec 08	1983 Dec 20	2001 Dec 30
16	17	18
2020 Jan 10	2038 Jan 21	2056 Feb 01
19	20	21
2074 Feb 11	2092 Feb 23	2110 Mar 06
22	23	24
2128 Mar 16	2146 Mar 28	2164 Apr 07
25	26	
2182 Apr 18	2200 Apr 30	

=== Tritos series ===
This eclipse is a part of a tritos cycle, repeating at alternating nodes every 135 synodic months (≈ 3986.63 days, or 11 years minus 1 month). Their appearance and longitude are irregular due to a lack of synchronization with the anomalistic month (period of perigee), but groupings of 3 tritos cycles (≈ 33 years minus 3 months) come close (≈ 434.044 anomalistic months), so eclipses are similar in these groupings.

Series members between 1801 and 2096
1802 Mar 19 (Saros 129)	1813 Feb 15 (Saros 130)	1824 Jan 16 (Saros 131)	1834 Dec 16 (Saros 132)	1845 Nov 14 (Saros 133)
1856 Oct 13 (Saros 134)	1867 Sep 14 (Saros 135)	1878 Aug 13 (Saros 136)	1889 Jul 12 (Saros 137)	1900 Jun 13 (Saros 138)
1911 May 13 (Saros 139)	1922 Apr 11 (Saros 140)	1933 Mar 12 (Saros 141)	1944 Feb 09 (Saros 142)	1955 Jan 08 (Saros 143)
1965 Dec 08 (Saros 144)	1976 Nov 06 (Saros 145)	1987 Oct 07 (Saros 146)	1998 Sep 06 (Saros 147)	2009 Aug 06 (Saros 148)
2020 Jul 05 (Saros 149)	2031 Jun 05 (Saros 150)			
		2096 Nov 29 (Saros 156)		

=== Inex series ===
This eclipse is a part of the long period inex cycle, repeating at alternating nodes, every 358 synodic months (≈ 10,571.95 days, or 29 years minus 20 days). Their appearance and longitude are irregular due to a lack of synchronization with the anomalistic month (period of perigee). However, groupings of 3 inex cycles (≈ 87 years minus 2 months) comes close (≈ 1,151.02 anomalistic months), so eclipses are similar in these groupings.

Series members between 1801 and 2200
1821 Mar 18 (Saros 139)	1850 Feb 26 (Saros 140)	1879 Feb 07 (Saros 141)
1908 Jan 18 (Saros 142)	1936 Dec 28 (Saros 143)	1965 Dec 08 (Saros 144)
1994 Nov 18 (Saros 145)	2023 Oct 28 (Saros 146)	2052 Oct 08 (Saros 147)
2081 Sep 18 (Saros 148)	2110 Aug 29 (Saros 149)	2139 Aug 10 (Saros 150)
2168 Jul 20 (Saros 151)	2197 Jun 29 (Saros 152)	

=== Half-Saros cycle ===
A lunar eclipse will be preceded and followed by solar eclipses by 9 years and 5.5 days (a half saros). This lunar eclipse is related to two partial solar eclipses of Solar Saros 151.

December 2, 1956	December 13, 1974

== See also ==
- List of lunar eclipses
- List of 20th-century lunar eclipses
