= December 2001 lunar eclipse =

Penumbral lunar eclipse 30 December 2001

- Penumbral eclipse
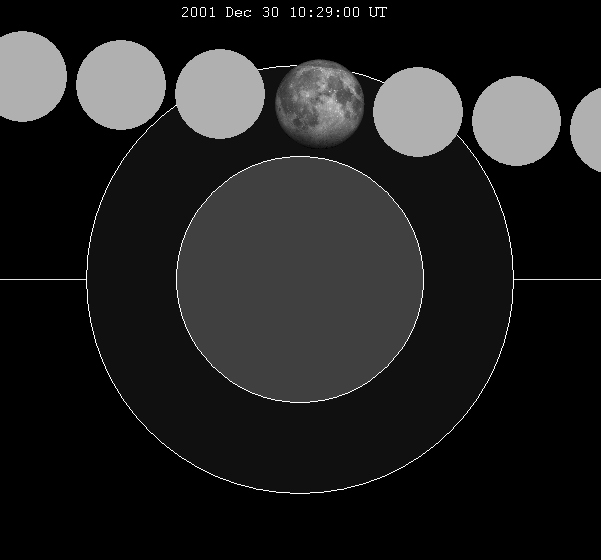
- Hourly motion shown right to left
- Date: December 30, 2001
- Gamma: 1.0731
- Magnitude: −0.1141
- Saros cycle: 144 (15 of 71)
- Penumbral: 243 minutes, 32 seconds
Contacts (UTC)
- P1: 8:27:35
- Greatest: 10:29:18
- P4: 12:31:07

A penumbral lunar eclipse occurred at the Moon’s ascending node of orbit on Sunday, December 30, 2001, with an umbral magnitude of −0.1141. A lunar eclipse occurs when the Moon moves into the Earth's shadow, causing the Moon to be darkened. A penumbral lunar eclipse occurs when part or all of the Moon's near side passes into the Earth's penumbra. Unlike a solar eclipse, which can only be viewed from a relatively small area of the world, a lunar eclipse may be viewed from anywhere on the night side of Earth. Occurring about 3.7 days before perigee (on January 2, 2002, at 2:10 UTC), the Moon's apparent diameter was larger.

== Visibility ==
The eclipse was completely visible over northeast Asia, the Pacific Ocean, and North America, seen rising over much of Asia and Australia and setting over South America.

The moon's hourly motion across the Earth's shadow in the constellation of Gemini.

== Eclipse details ==
Shown below is a table displaying details about this particular solar eclipse. It describes various parameters pertaining to this eclipse.

December 30, 2001 Lunar Eclipse Parameters
Parameter	Value
Penumbral Magnitude	0.89477
Umbral Magnitude	−0.11407
Gamma	1.07318
Sun Right Ascension	18h38m16.3s
Sun Declination	-23°08'50.7"
Sun Semi-Diameter	16'15.9"
Sun Equatorial Horizontal Parallax	08.9"
Moon Right Ascension	06h38m07.7s
Moon Declination	+24°12'18.7"
Moon Semi-Diameter	16'07.4"
Moon Equatorial Horizontal Parallax	0°59'10.2"
ΔT	64.3 s

== Eclipse season ==
This eclipse is part of an eclipse season, a period, roughly every six months, when eclipses occur. Only two (or occasionally three) eclipse seasons occur each year, and each season lasts about 35 days and repeats just short of six months (173 days) later; thus two full eclipse seasons always occur each year. Either two or three eclipses happen each eclipse season. In the sequence below, each eclipse is separated by a fortnight.

Eclipse season of December 2001
December 14 Descending node (new moon)	December 30 Ascending node (full moon)
Annular solar eclipse Solar Saros 132	Penumbral lunar eclipse Lunar Saros 144

== Related eclipses ==
=== Eclipses in 2001 ===
- A total lunar eclipse on January 9.
- A total solar eclipse on June 21.
- A partial lunar eclipse on July 5.
- An annular solar eclipse on December 14.
- A penumbral lunar eclipse on December 30.

=== Metonic ===
- Preceded by: Lunar eclipse of March 13, 1998
- Followed by: Lunar eclipse of October 17, 2005

=== Tzolkinex ===
- Preceded by: Lunar eclipse of November 18, 1994
- Followed by: Lunar eclipse of February 9, 2009

=== Half-Saros ===
- Preceded by: Solar eclipse of December 24, 1992
- Followed by: Solar eclipse of January 4, 2011

=== Tritos ===
- Preceded by: Lunar eclipse of January 30, 1991
- Followed by: Lunar eclipse of November 28, 2012

=== Lunar Saros 144 ===
- Preceded by: Lunar eclipse of December 20, 1983
- Followed by: Lunar eclipse of January 10, 2020

=== Inex ===
- Preceded by: Lunar eclipse of January 18, 1973
- Followed by: Lunar eclipse of December 9, 2030

=== Triad ===
- Preceded by: Lunar eclipse of March 1, 1915
- Followed by: Lunar eclipse of October 30, 2088

=== Lunar eclipses of 1998–2002 ===
This eclipse is a member of a semester series. An eclipse in a semester series of lunar eclipses repeats approximately every 177 days and 4 hours (a semester) at alternating nodes of the Moon's orbit.

The penumbral lunar eclipses on March 13, 1998 and September 6, 1998 occur in the previous lunar year eclipse set, and the penumbral lunar eclipses on May 26, 2002 and November 20, 2002 occur in the next lunar year eclipse set.

Lunar eclipse series sets from 1998 to 2002
Descending node				Ascending node			
Saros	Date Viewing	Type Chart	Gamma	Saros	Date Viewing	Type Chart	Gamma
109	1998 Aug 08	Penumbral	1.4876	114	1999 Jan 31	Penumbral	−1.0190
119	1999 Jul 28	Partial	0.7863	124	2000 Jan 21	Total	−0.2957
129	2000 Jul 16	Total	0.0302	134	2001 Jan 09	Total	0.3720
139	2001 Jul 05	Partial	−0.7287	144	2001 Dec 30	Penumbral	1.0732
149	2002 Jun 24	Penumbral	−1.4440				

=== Saros 144 ===
This eclipse is a part of Saros series 144, repeating every 18 years, 11 days, and containing 71 events. The series started with a penumbral lunar eclipse on July 29, 1749. It contains partial eclipses from March 28, 2146 through June 23, 2290; total eclipses from July 4, 2308 through January 28, 2651; and a second set of partial eclipses from February 8, 2669 through June 8, 2867. The series ends at member 71 as a penumbral eclipse on September 4, 3011.

The longest duration of totality will be produced by member 38 at 104 minutes, 53 seconds on September 7, 2416. All eclipses in this series occur at the Moon’s ascending node of orbit.

Greatest	First			
The greatest eclipse of the series will occur on 2416 Sep 07, lasting 104 minutes, 53 seconds.	Penumbral	Partial	Total	Central
The greatest eclipse of the series will occur on 2416 Sep 07, lasting 104 minutes, 53 seconds.	1749 Jul 29	2146 Mar 28	2308 Jul 04	2362 Aug 06
The greatest eclipse of the series will occur on 2416 Sep 07, lasting 104 minutes, 53 seconds.	Last			
The greatest eclipse of the series will occur on 2416 Sep 07, lasting 104 minutes, 53 seconds.	Central	Total	Partial	Penumbral
The greatest eclipse of the series will occur on 2416 Sep 07, lasting 104 minutes, 53 seconds.	2488 Oct 20	2651 Jan 28	2867 Jun 08	3011 Sep 04

Eclipses are tabulated in three columns; every third eclipse in the same column is one exeligmos apart, so they all cast shadows over approximately the same parts of the Earth.

Series members 4–26 occur between 1801 and 2200:
4	5	6
1803 Sep 01	1821 Sep 11	1839 Sep 23
7	8	9
1857 Oct 03	1875 Oct 14	1893 Oct 25
10	11	12
1911 Nov 06	1929 Nov 17	1947 Nov 28
13	14	15
1965 Dec 08	1983 Dec 20	2001 Dec 30
16	17	18
2020 Jan 10	2038 Jan 21	2056 Feb 01
19	20	21
2074 Feb 11	2092 Feb 23	2110 Mar 06
22	23	24
2128 Mar 16	2146 Mar 28	2164 Apr 07
25	26	
2182 Apr 18	2200 Apr 30	

=== Tritos series ===
This eclipse is a part of a tritos cycle, repeating at alternating nodes every 135 synodic months (≈ 3986.63 days, or 11 years minus 1 month). Their appearance and longitude are irregular due to a lack of synchronization with the anomalistic month (period of perigee), but groupings of 3 tritos cycles (≈ 33 years minus 3 months) come close (≈ 434.044 anomalistic months), so eclipses are similar in these groupings.

Series members between 1801 and 2132
1805 Jul 11 (Saros 126)	1816 Jun 10 (Saros 127)	1827 May 11 (Saros 128)	1838 Apr 10 (Saros 129)	1849 Mar 09 (Saros 130)
1860 Feb 07 (Saros 131)	1871 Jan 06 (Saros 132)	1881 Dec 05 (Saros 133)	1892 Nov 04 (Saros 134)	1903 Oct 06 (Saros 135)
1914 Sep 04 (Saros 136)	1925 Aug 04 (Saros 137)	1936 Jul 04 (Saros 138)	1947 Jun 03 (Saros 139)	1958 May 03 (Saros 140)
1969 Apr 02 (Saros 141)	1980 Mar 01 (Saros 142)	1991 Jan 30 (Saros 143)	2001 Dec 30 (Saros 144)	2012 Nov 28 (Saros 145)
2023 Oct 28 (Saros 146)	2034 Sep 28 (Saros 147)	2045 Aug 27 (Saros 148)	2056 Jul 26 (Saros 149)	2067 Jun 27 (Saros 150)
2132 Dec 22 (Saros 156)

=== Inex series ===
This eclipse is a part of the long period inex cycle, repeating at alternating nodes, every 358 synodic months (≈ 10,571.95 days, or 29 years minus 20 days). Their appearance and longitude are irregular due to a lack of synchronization with the anomalistic month (period of perigee). However, groupings of 3 inex cycles (≈ 87 years minus 2 months) comes close (≈ 1,151.02 anomalistic months), so eclipses are similar in these groupings.

Series members between 1801 and 2200
1828 Apr 29 (Saros 138)	1857 Apr 09 (Saros 139)	1886 Mar 20 (Saros 140)
1915 Mar 01 (Saros 141)	1944 Feb 09 (Saros 142)	1973 Jan 18 (Saros 143)
2001 Dec 30 (Saros 144)	2030 Dec 09 (Saros 145)	2059 Nov 19 (Saros 146)
2088 Oct 30 (Saros 147)	2117 Oct 10 (Saros 148)	2146 Sep 20 (Saros 149)
2175 Aug 31 (Saros 150)

=== Half-Saros cycle ===
A lunar eclipse will be preceded and followed by solar eclipses by 9 years and 5.5 days (a half saros). This lunar eclipse is related to two partial solar eclipses of Solar Saros 151.

December 24, 1992	January 4, 2011

== See also ==
- List of lunar eclipses
- List of 21st-century lunar eclipses
