= January 2038 lunar eclipse =

Astronomical event

- Penumbral eclipse
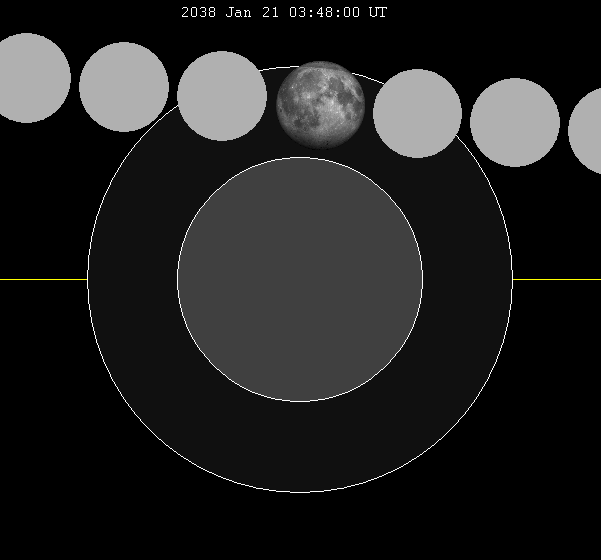
- The Moon's hourly motion shown right to left
- Date: January 21, 2038
- Gamma: 1.0710
- Magnitude: −0.1127
- Saros cycle: 144 (17 of 70)
- Penumbral: 245 minutes, 48 seconds
Contacts (UTC)
- P1: 1:46:58
- Greatest: 3:49:52
- P4: 5:52:46

A penumbral lunar eclipse will occur at the Moon's ascending node of orbit on Thursday, January 21, 2038, with an umbral magnitude of −0.1127. A lunar eclipse occurs when the Moon moves into the Earth's shadow, causing the Moon to be darkened. A penumbral lunar eclipse occurs when part or all of the Moon's near side passes into the Earth's penumbra. Unlike a solar eclipse, which can only be viewed from a relatively small area of the world, a lunar eclipse may be viewed from anywhere on the night side of Earth. Occurring about 3.1 days before perigee (on January 24, 2038, at 4:50 UTC), the Moon's apparent diameter will be larger.

This eclipse will be the first of four penumbral lunar eclipses in 2038, with the others occurring on June 17, July 16, and December 11.

== Visibility ==
The eclipse will be completely visible over North and South America, west Africa, and Europe, seen rising over the eastern Pacific Ocean and setting over east Africa and west and central Asia.

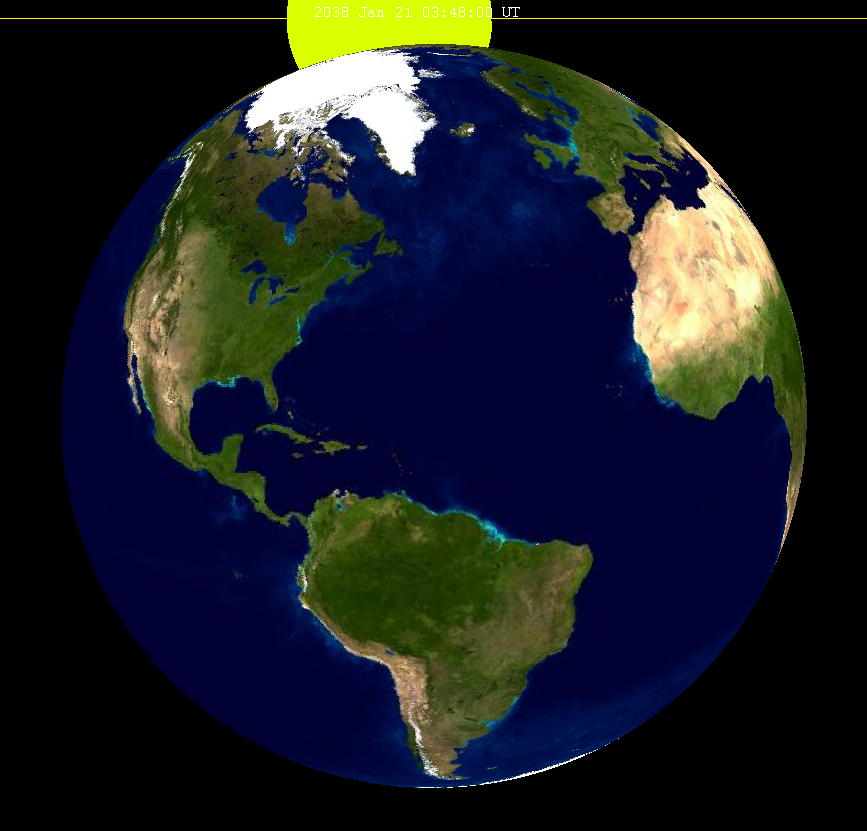
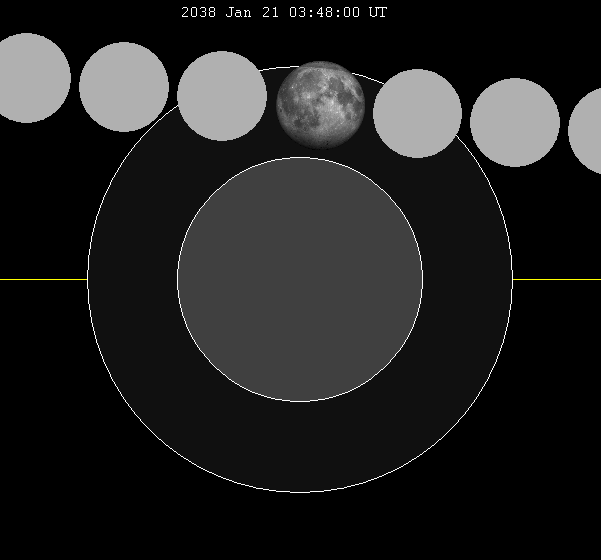

== Eclipse details ==
Shown below is a table displaying details about this particular solar eclipse. It describes various parameters pertaining to this eclipse.

January 21, 2038 Lunar Eclipse Parameters
Parameter	Value
Penumbral Magnitude	0.90085
Umbral Magnitude	−0.11271
Gamma	1.07108
Sun Right Ascension	20h13m39.3s
Sun Declination	-19°53'23.0"
Sun Semi-Diameter	16'15.2"
Sun Equatorial Horizontal Parallax	08.9"
Moon Right Ascension	08h14m12.5s
Moon Declination	+20°55'55.8"
Moon Semi-Diameter	16'02.1"
Moon Equatorial Horizontal Parallax	0°58'51.1"
ΔT	78.0 s

== Eclipse season ==
This eclipse is part of an eclipse season, a period, roughly every six months, when eclipses occur. Only two (or occasionally three) eclipse seasons occur each year, and each season lasts about 35 days and repeats just short of six months (173 days) later; thus two full eclipse seasons always occur each year. Either two or three eclipses happen each eclipse season. In the sequence below, each eclipse is separated by a fortnight.

Eclipse season of January 2038
January 5 Descending node (new moon)	January 21 Ascending node (full moon)
Annular solar eclipse Solar Saros 132	Penumbral lunar eclipse Lunar Saros 144

== Related eclipses ==
=== Eclipses in 2038 ===
- An annular solar eclipse on January 5.
- A penumbral lunar eclipse on January 21.
- A penumbral lunar eclipse on June 17.
- An annular solar eclipse on July 2.
- A penumbral lunar eclipse on July 16.
- A penumbral lunar eclipse on December 11.
- A total solar eclipse on December 26.

=== Metonic ===
- Preceded by: Lunar eclipse of April 3, 2034
- Followed by: Lunar eclipse of November 8, 2041

=== Tzolkinex ===
- Preceded by: Lunar eclipse of December 9, 2030
- Followed by: Lunar eclipse of March 3, 2045

=== Half-Saros ===
- Preceded by: Solar eclipse of January 14, 2029
- Followed by: Solar eclipse of January 26, 2047

=== Tritos ===
- Preceded by: Lunar eclipse of February 20, 2027
- Followed by: Lunar eclipse of December 20, 2048

=== Lunar Saros 144 ===
- Preceded by: Lunar eclipse of January 10, 2020
- Followed by: Lunar eclipse of February 1, 2056

=== Inex ===
- Preceded by: Lunar eclipse of February 9, 2009
- Followed by: Lunar eclipse of December 31, 2066

=== Triad ===
- Preceded by: Lunar eclipse of March 23, 1951
- Followed by: Lunar eclipse of November 21, 2124

=== Lunar eclipses of 2035–2038 ===
This eclipse is a member of a semester series. An eclipse in a semester series of lunar eclipses repeats approximately every 177 days and 4 hours (a semester) at alternating nodes of the Moon's orbit.

The penumbral lunar eclipses on June 17, 2038 and December 11, 2038 occur in the next lunar year eclipse set.

Lunar eclipse series sets from 2035 to 2038
Ascending node				Descending node			
Saros	Date Viewing	Type Chart	Gamma	Saros	Date Viewing	Type Chart	Gamma
114	2035 Feb 22	Penumbral	−1.0357	119	2035 Aug 19	Partial	0.9433
124	2036 Feb 11	Total	−0.3110	129	2036 Aug 07	Total	0.2004
134	2037 Jan 31	Total	0.3619	139	2037 Jul 27	Partial	−0.5582
144	2038 Jan 21	Penumbral	1.0710	149	2038 Jul 16	Penumbral	−1.2837

=== Saros 144 ===
This eclipse is a part of Saros series 144, repeating every 18 years, 11 days, and containing 71 events. The series started with a penumbral lunar eclipse on July 29, 1749. It contains partial eclipses from March 28, 2146 through June 23, 2290; total eclipses from July 4, 2308 through January 28, 2651; and a second set of partial eclipses from February 8, 2669 through June 8, 2867. The series ends at member 71 as a penumbral eclipse on September 4, 3011.

The longest duration of totality will be produced by member 38 at 104 minutes, 53 seconds on September 7, 2416. All eclipses in this series occur at the Moon’s ascending node of orbit.

Greatest	First			
The greatest eclipse of the series will occur on 2416 Sep 07, lasting 104 minutes, 53 seconds.	Penumbral	Partial	Total	Central
The greatest eclipse of the series will occur on 2416 Sep 07, lasting 104 minutes, 53 seconds.	1749 Jul 29	2146 Mar 28	2308 Jul 04	2362 Aug 06
The greatest eclipse of the series will occur on 2416 Sep 07, lasting 104 minutes, 53 seconds.	Last			
The greatest eclipse of the series will occur on 2416 Sep 07, lasting 104 minutes, 53 seconds.	Central	Total	Partial	Penumbral
The greatest eclipse of the series will occur on 2416 Sep 07, lasting 104 minutes, 53 seconds.	2488 Oct 20	2651 Jan 28	2867 Jun 08	3011 Sep 04

Eclipses are tabulated in three columns; every third eclipse in the same column is one exeligmos apart, so they all cast shadows over approximately the same parts of the Earth.

Series members 4–26 occur between 1801 and 2200:
4	5	6
1803 Sep 01	1821 Sep 11	1839 Sep 23
7	8	9
1857 Oct 03	1875 Oct 14	1893 Oct 25
10	11	12
1911 Nov 06	1929 Nov 17	1947 Nov 28
13	14	15
1965 Dec 08	1983 Dec 20	2001 Dec 30
16	17	18
2020 Jan 10	2038 Jan 21	2056 Feb 01
19	20	21
2074 Feb 11	2092 Feb 23	2110 Mar 06
22	23	24
2128 Mar 16	2146 Mar 28	2164 Apr 07
25	26	
2182 Apr 18	2200 Apr 30	

=== Tritos series ===
This eclipse is a part of a tritos cycle, repeating at alternating nodes every 135 synodic months (≈ 3986.63 days, or 11 years minus 1 month). Their appearance and longitude are irregular due to a lack of synchronization with the anomalistic month (period of perigee), but groupings of 3 tritos cycles (≈ 33 years minus 3 months) come close (≈ 434.044 anomalistic months), so eclipses are similar in these groupings.

Series members between 1801 and 2200
1808 Nov 03 (Saros 123)	1819 Oct 03 (Saros 124)	1830 Sep 02 (Saros 125)	1841 Aug 02 (Saros 126)	1852 Jul 01 (Saros 127)
1863 Jun 01 (Saros 128)	1874 May 01 (Saros 129)	1885 Mar 30 (Saros 130)	1896 Feb 28 (Saros 131)	1907 Jan 29 (Saros 132)
1917 Dec 28 (Saros 133)	1928 Nov 27 (Saros 134)	1939 Oct 28 (Saros 135)	1950 Sep 26 (Saros 136)	1961 Aug 26 (Saros 137)
1972 Jul 26 (Saros 138)	1983 Jun 25 (Saros 139)	1994 May 25 (Saros 140)	2005 Apr 24 (Saros 141)	2016 Mar 23 (Saros 142)
2027 Feb 20 (Saros 143)	2038 Jan 21 (Saros 144)	2048 Dec 20 (Saros 145)	2059 Nov 19 (Saros 146)	2070 Oct 19 (Saros 147)
2081 Sep 18 (Saros 148)	2092 Aug 17 (Saros 149)	2103 Jul 19 (Saros 150)	2114 Jun 18 (Saros 151)	2125 May 17 (Saros 152)
2136 Apr 16 (Saros 153)			2169 Jan 13 (Saros 156)	
2190 Nov 12 (Saros 158)

=== Inex series ===
This eclipse is a part of the long period inex cycle, repeating at alternating nodes, every 358 synodic months (≈ 10,571.95 days, or 29 years minus 20 days). Their appearance and longitude are irregular due to a lack of synchronization with the anomalistic month (period of perigee). However, groupings of 3 inex cycles (≈ 87 years minus 2 months) comes close (≈ 1,151.02 anomalistic months), so eclipses are similar in these groupings.

Series members between 1801 and 2200
1806 Jun 30 (Saros 136)	1835 Jun 10 (Saros 137)	1864 May 21 (Saros 138)
1893 Apr 30 (Saros 139)	1922 Apr 11 (Saros 140)	1951 Mar 23 (Saros 141)
1980 Mar 01 (Saros 142)	2009 Feb 09 (Saros 143)	2038 Jan 21 (Saros 144)
2066 Dec 31 (Saros 145)	2095 Dec 11 (Saros 146)	2124 Nov 21 (Saros 147)
2153 Nov 01 (Saros 148)	2182 Oct 11 (Saros 149)	

=== Half-Saros cycle ===
A lunar eclipse will be preceded and followed by solar eclipses by 9 years and 5.5 days (a half saros). This lunar eclipse is related to two total solar eclipses of Solar Saros 151.

January 14, 2029	January 26, 2047

== See also ==
- List of lunar eclipses and List of 21st-century lunar eclipses
