= Lunar Saros 144 =

Series of lunar eclipses

Member 16
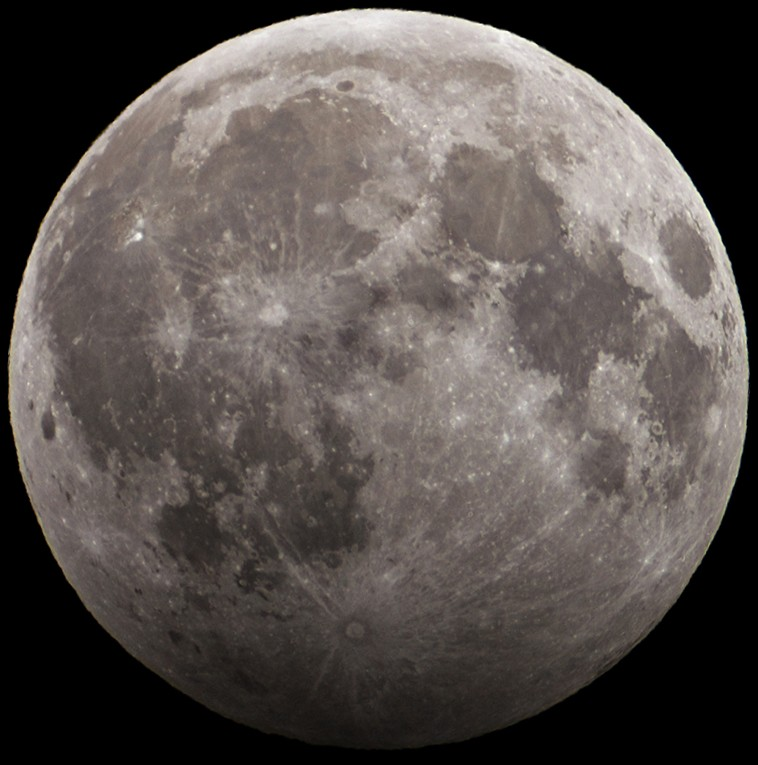
2020 Jan 10

Saros cycle series 144 for lunar eclipses occurs at the moon's ascending node, 18 years 11 and 1/3 days. It contains 71 events.

This lunar saros is linked to Solar Saros 151.

Cat.	Saros	Mem	Date	Time UT (hr:mn)	Type	Gamma	Magnitude	Duration (min)			Contacts UT (hr:mn)						Chart
Cat.	Saros	Mem	Date	Greatest	Type	Gamma	Magnitude	Pen.	Par.	Tot.	P1	P4	U1	U2	U3	U4	Chart
09043	144	1	1749 Jul 29	16:31:02	Penumbral	1.5083	-0.8842	67.7			15:57:11	17:04:53					
09090	144	2	1767 Aug 10	0:02:55	Penumbral	1.4447	-0.7690	113.2			23:06:19	0:59:31					
09135	144	3	1785 Aug 20	7:38:39	Penumbral	1.3843	-0.6598	142.9			6:27:12	8:50:06					
09180	144	4	1803 Sep 01	15:19:10	Penumbral	1.3282	-0.5589	165.1			13:56:37	16:41:43					
09225	144	5	1821 Sep 11	23:04:56	Penumbral	1.2766	-0.4666	182.9			21:33:29	0:36:23					
09271	144	6	1839 Sep 23	6:57:39	Penumbral	1.2311	-0.3855	197.0			5:19:09	8:36:09					
09316	144	7	1857 Oct 03	14:56:57	Penumbral	1.1914	-0.3150	208.4			13:12:45	16:41:09					
09360	144	8	1875 Oct 14	23:02:55	Penumbral	1.1577	-0.2558	217.7			21:14:04	0:51:46					
09404	144	9	1893 Oct 25	7:16:16	Penumbral	1.1305	-0.2084	225.0			5:23:46	9:08:46					
09446	144	10	1911 Nov 06	15:36:45	Penumbral	1.1100	-0.1733	230.6			13:41:27	17:32:03					
09488	144	11	1929 Nov 17	0:03:13	Penumbral	1.0947	-0.1474	235.0			22:05:43	2:00:43					
09530	144	12	1947 Nov 28	8:34:29	Penumbral	1.0838	-0.1297	238.3			6:35:20	10:33:38					
09571	144	13	1965 Dec 08	17:10:32	Penumbral	1.0774	-0.1201	240.7			15:10:11	19:10:53					
09612	144	14	1983 Dec 20	1:49:57	Penumbral	1.0746	-0.1167	242.3			23:48:48	3:51:06					
09653	144	15	2001 Dec 30	10:30:22	Penumbral	1.0731	-0.1155	243.5			8:28:37	12:32:07					
09694	144	16	2020 Jan 10	19:11:11	Penumbral	1.0726	-0.1160	244.6			17:08:53	21:13:29					
09735	144	17	2038 Jan 21	3:49:52	Penumbral	1.0710	-0.1140	245.8			1:46:58	5:52:46					
09775	144	18	2056 Feb 01	12:26:06	Penumbral	1.0682	-0.1096	247.2			10:22:30	14:29:42					
09816	144	19	2074 Feb 11	20:55:58	Penumbral	1.0611	-0.0972	249.5			18:51:13	23:00:43					
09857	144	20	2092 Feb 23	5:20:59	Penumbral	1.0509	-0.0789	252.4			3:14:47	7:27:11					
09900	144	21	2110 Mar 06	13:37:20	Penumbral	1.0345	-0.0491	256.4			11:29:08	15:45:32					
09942	144	22	2128 Mar 16	21:46:08	Penumbral	1.0128	-0.0093	261.3			19:35:29	23:56:47					
09985	144	23	2146 Mar 28	5:44:28	Partial	0.9832	0.0448	267.6	48.6		3:30:40	7:58:16	5:20:10			6:08:46	
10029	144	24	2164 Apr 07	13:34:34	Partial	0.9479	0.1095	274.6	75.5		11:17:16	15:51:52	12:56:49			14:12:19	
10072	144	25	2182 Apr 18	21:14:14	Partial	0.9049	0.1883	282.5	98.3		18:52:59	23:35:29	20:25:05			22:03:23	
10115	144	26	2200 Apr 30	4:44:34	Partial	0.8550	0.2797	291.1	118.6		2:19:01	7:10:07	3:45:16			5:43:52	
10159	144	27	2218 May 11	12:05:34	Partial	0.7980	0.3839	300.0	137.2		9:35:34	14:35:34	10:56:58			13:14:10	
10203	144	28	2236 May 21	19:18:51	Partial	0.7352	0.4987	309.1	154.2		16:44:18	21:53:24	18:01:45			20:35:57	
10248	144	29	2254 Jun 02	2:24:40	Partial	0.6670	0.6231	317.9	169.5		23:45:43	5:03:37	0:59:55			3:49:25	
10294	144	30	2272 Jun 12	9:23:36	Partial	0.5938	0.7565	326.5	183.3		6:40:21	12:06:51	7:51:57			10:55:15	
10341	144	31	2290 Jun 23	16:17:39	Partial	0.5172	0.8959	334.4	195.3		13:30:27	19:04:51	14:40:00			17:55:18	
10388	144	32	2308 Jul 04	23:07:47	Total	0.4377	1.0404	341.6	205.5	31.9	20:16:59	1:58:35	21:25:02	22:51:50	23:23:44	0:50:32	
10434	144	33	2326 Jul 16	5:54:47	Total	0.3565	1.1878	347.8	214.0	65.9	3:00:53	8:48:41	4:07:47	5:21:50	6:27:44	7:41:47	
10480	144	34	2344 Jul 26	12:40:59	Total	0.2752	1.3351	353.2	220.7	83.8	9:44:23	15:37:35	10:50:38	11:59:05	13:22:53	14:31:20	
10525	144	35	2362 Aug 06	19:27:11	Total	0.1948	1.4807	357.5	225.7	94.9	16:28:26	22:25:56	17:34:20	18:39:44	20:14:38	21:20:02	
10570	144	36	2380 Aug 17	2:16:10	Total	0.1172	1.6209	360.8	229.1	101.5	23:15:46	5:16:34	0:21:37	1:25:25	3:06:55	4:10:43	
10614	144	37	2398 Aug 28	9:06:27	Total	0.0414	1.7575	363.3	230.9	104.6	6:04:48	12:08:06	7:11:00	8:14:09	9:58:45	11:01:54	
10659	144	38	2416 Sep 07	16:02:33	Total	-0.0288	1.7780	364.9	231.5	104.9	13:00:06	19:05:00	14:06:48	15:10:06	16:55:00	17:58:18	
10703	144	39	2434 Sep 18	23:02:35	Total	-0.0951	1.6538	365.8	230.9	102.8	19:59:41	2:05:29	21:07:08	22:11:11	23:53:59	0:58:02	
10747	144	40	2452 Sep 29	6:10:28	Total	-0.1542	1.5426	366.2	229.6	98.7	3:07:22	9:13:34	4:15:40	5:21:07	6:59:49	8:05:16	
10789	144	41	2470 Oct 10	13:23:39	Total	-0.2084	1.4405	366.2	227.5	93.0	10:20:33	16:26:45	11:29:54	12:37:09	14:10:09	15:17:24	
10831	144	42	2488 Oct 20	20:46:19	Total	-0.2544	1.3535	365.9	225.2	86.4	17:43:22	23:49:16	18:53:43	20:03:07	21:29:31	22:38:55	
10872	144	43	2506 Nov 02	4:15:24	Total	-0.2945	1.2773	365.6	222.8	78.8	1:12:36	7:18:12	2:24:00	3:36:00	4:54:48	6:06:48	
10913	144	44	2524 Nov 12	11:52:58	Total	-0.3270	1.2152	365.2	220.4	71.0	8:50:22	14:55:34	10:02:46	11:17:28	12:28:28	13:43:10	
10954	144	45	2542 Nov 23	19:37:00	Total	-0.3540	1.1635	364.9	218.3	63.1	16:34:33	22:39:27	17:47:51	19:05:27	20:08:33	21:26:09	
10996	144	46	2560 Dec 04	3:28:39	Total	-0.3739	1.1250	364.8	216.6	55.9	0:26:15	6:31:03	1:40:21	3:00:42	3:56:36	5:16:57	
11037	144	47	2578 Dec 15	11:24:39	Total	-0.3903	1.0933	364.7	215.1	48.8	8:22:18	14:27:00	9:37:06	11:00:15	11:49:03	13:12:12	
11077	144	48	2596 Dec 25	19:24:44	Total	-0.4030	1.0688	364.6	213.9	42.3	16:22:26	22:27:02	17:37:47	19:03:35	19:45:53	21:11:41	
11117	144	49	2615 Jan 07	3:27:06	Total	-0.4133	1.0490	364.6	213.0	36.0	0:24:48	6:29:24	1:40:36	3:09:06	3:45:06	5:13:36	
11156	144	50	2633 Jan 17	11:31:11	Total	-0.4215	1.0334	364.5	212.2	29.9	8:28:56	14:33:26	9:45:05	11:16:14	11:46:08	13:17:17	
11197	144	51	2651 Jan 28	19:32:59	Total	-0.4314	1.0151	364.1	211.2	20.2	16:30:56	22:35:02	17:47:23	19:22:53	19:43:05	21:18:35	
11239	144	52	2669 Feb 08	3:33:04	Partial	-0.4424	0.9951	363.5	210.0		0:31:19	6:34:49	1:48:04			5:18:04	
11282	144	53	2687 Feb 19	11:28:02	Partial	-0.4574	0.9682	362.5	208.3		8:26:47	14:29:17	9:43:53			13:12:11	
11325	144	54	2705 Mar 02	19:18:45	Partial	-0.4756	0.9357	361.1	206.2		16:18:12	22:19:18	17:35:39			21:01:51	
11368	144	55	2723 Mar 14	3:00:48	Partial	-0.5004	0.8913	358.9	202.9		0:01:21	6:00:15	1:19:21			4:42:15	
11410	144	56	2741 Mar 24	10:36:55	Partial	-0.5301	0.8383	356.2	198.7		7:38:49	13:35:01	8:57:34			12:16:16	
11454	144	57	2759 Apr 04	18:03:23	Partial	-0.5676	0.7710	352.5	192.9		15:07:08	20:59:38	16:26:56			19:39:50	
11498	144	58	2777 Apr 15	1:22:23	Partial	-0.6112	0.6927	347.8	185.3		22:28:29	4:16:17	23:49:44			2:55:02	
11544	144	59	2795 Apr 26	8:31:28	Partial	-0.6630	0.5996	341.7	175.0		5:40:37	11:22:19	7:03:58			9:58:58	
11590	144	60	2813 May 6	15:33:47	Partial	-0.7203	0.4963	334.4	161.9		12:46:35	18:20:59	14:12:50			16:54:44	
11638	144	61	2831 May 17	22:27:44	Partial	-0.7844	0.3804	325.5	144.2		19:44:59	1:10:29	21:15:38			23:39:50	
11684	144	62	2849 May 28	5:14:53	Partial	-0.8542	0.2543	314.7	120.0		2:37:32	7:52:14	4:14:53			6:14:53	
11730	144	63	2867 Jun 08	11:56:08	Partial	-0.9288	0.1189	301.8	83.6		9:25:14	14:27:02	11:14:20			12:37:56	
11776	144	64	2885 Jun 18	18:33:10	Penumbral	-1.0070	-0.0230	286.6			16:09:52	20:56:28					
11822	144	65	2903 Jul 01	1:07:21	Penumbral	-1.0874	-0.1692	269.0			22:52:51	3:21:51					
11867	144	66	2921 Jul 11	7:38:47	Penumbral	-1.1700	-0.3194	248.2			5:34:41	9:42:53					
11912	144	67	2939 Jul 22	14:10:52	Penumbral	-1.2522	-0.4692	224.2			12:18:46	16:02:58					
11957	144	68	2957 Aug 01	20:43:50	Penumbral	-1.3338	-0.6182	195.8			19:05:56	22:21:44					
12003	144	69	2975 Aug 13	3:19:41	Penumbral	-1.4131	-0.7631	161.8			1:58:47	4:40:35					
12047	144	70	2993 Aug 23	9:59:37	Penumbral	-1.4893	-0.9024	118.1			9:00:34	10:58:40					

== See also ==
- List of lunar eclipses
  - List of Saros series for lunar eclipses
