= Solar eclipse of December 13, 1974 =

20th-century partial solar eclipse

- Partial eclipse
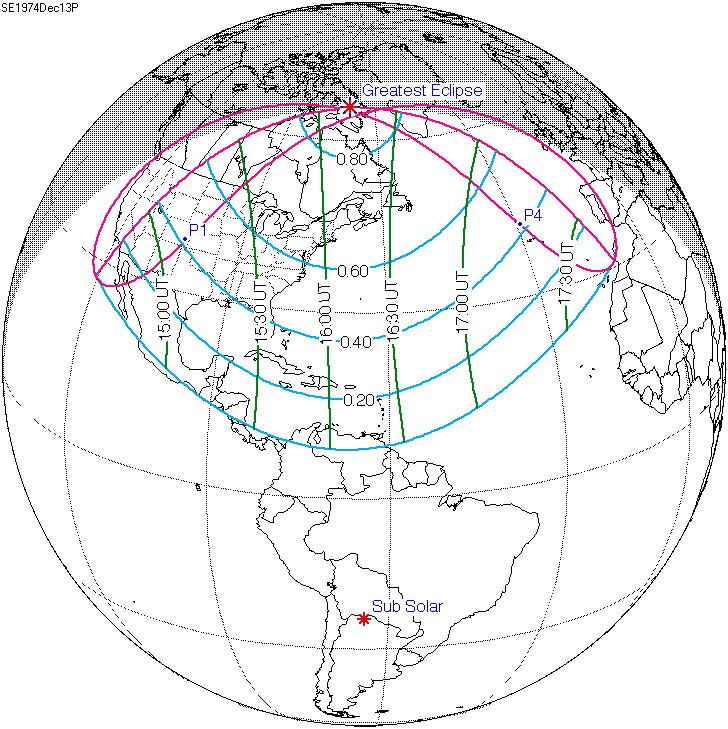
- Map
- Gamma: 1.0797
- Magnitude: 0.8266

Maximum eclipse
- Coordinates: 66.8°N 69.4°W

Times (UTC)
- Greatest eclipse: 16:13:13

References
- Saros: 151 (12 of 72)
- Catalog # (SE5000): 9453

A partial solar eclipse occurred at the Moon's ascending node of orbit on Friday, December 13, 1974, with a magnitude of 0.8266. A solar eclipse occurs when the Moon passes between Earth and the Sun, thereby totally or partly obscuring the image of the Sun for a viewer on Earth. A partial solar eclipse occurs in the polar regions of the Earth when the center of the Moon's shadow misses the Earth.

A partial eclipse was visible for parts of North America, the Caribbean, extreme northern South America, and the Iberian Peninsula.

== Eclipse details ==
Shown below are two tables displaying details about this particular solar eclipse. The first table outlines times at which the Moon's penumbra or umbra attains the specific parameter, and the second table describes various other parameters pertaining to this eclipse.

December 13, 1974 Solar Eclipse Times
Event	Time (UTC)
First Penumbral External Contact	1974 December 13 at 14:03:46.5 UTC
Greatest Eclipse	1974 December 13 at 16:13:13.1 UTC
Equatorial Conjunction	1974 December 13 at 16:17:20.5 UTC
Ecliptic Conjunction	1974 December 13 at 16:25:30.1 UTC
Last Penumbral External Contact	1974 December 13 at 18:22:43.5 UTC

December 13, 1974 Solar Eclipse Parameters
Parameter	Value
Eclipse Magnitude	0.82664
Eclipse Obscuration	0.76006
Gamma	1.07974
Sun Right Ascension	17h22m00.7s
Sun Declination	-23°09'15.3"
Sun Semi-Diameter	16'14.8"
Sun Equatorial Horizontal Parallax	08.9"
Moon Right Ascension	17h21m52.0s
Moon Declination	-22°09'07.8"
Moon Semi-Diameter	15'13.3"
Moon Equatorial Horizontal Parallax	0°55'51.8"
ΔT	45.4 s

== Eclipse season ==
This eclipse is part of an eclipse season, a period, roughly every six months, when eclipses occur. Only two (or occasionally three) eclipse seasons occur each year, and each season lasts about 35 days and repeats just short of six months (173 days) later; thus two full eclipse seasons always occur each year. Either two or three eclipses happen each eclipse season. In the sequence below, each eclipse is separated by a fortnight.

Eclipse season of November–December 1974
November 29 Descending node (full moon)	December 13 Ascending node (new moon)
Total lunar eclipse Lunar Saros 125	Partial solar eclipse Solar Saros 151

== Related eclipses ==
=== Eclipses in 1974 ===
- A partial lunar eclipse on June 4.
- A total solar eclipse on June 20.
- A total lunar eclipse on November 29.
- A partial solar eclipse on December 13.

=== Metonic ===
- Preceded by: Solar eclipse of February 25, 1971
- Followed by: Solar eclipse of October 2, 1978

=== Tzolkinex ===
- Preceded by: Solar eclipse of November 2, 1967
- Followed by: Solar eclipse of January 25, 1982

=== Half-Saros ===
- Preceded by: Lunar eclipse of December 8, 1965
- Followed by: Lunar eclipse of December 20, 1983

=== Tritos ===
- Preceded by: Solar eclipse of January 14, 1964
- Followed by: Solar eclipse of November 12, 1985

=== Solar Saros 151 ===
- Preceded by: Solar eclipse of December 2, 1956
- Followed by: Solar eclipse of December 24, 1992

=== Inex ===
- Preceded by: Solar eclipse of January 3, 1946
- Followed by: Solar eclipse of November 23, 2003

=== Triad ===
- Preceded by: Solar eclipse of February 11, 1888
- Followed by: Solar eclipse of October 13, 2061

=== Solar eclipses of 1971–1974 ===
This eclipse is a member of a semester series. An eclipse in a semester series of solar eclipses repeats approximately every 177 days and 4 hours (a semester) at alternating nodes of the Moon's orbit.

The partial solar eclipses on February 25, 1971 and August 20, 1971 occur in the previous lunar year eclipse set.

Solar eclipse series sets from 1971 to 1974
Descending node			Ascending node		
Saros	Map	Gamma	Saros	Map	Gamma
116	July 22, 1971 Partial	1.513	121	January 16, 1972 Annular	−0.9365
126	July 10, 1972 Total	0.6872	131	January 4, 1973 Annular	−0.2644
136	June 30, 1973 Total	−0.0785	141	December 24, 1973 Annular	0.4171
146	June 20, 1974 Total	−0.8239	151	December 13, 1974 Partial	1.0797

=== Saros 151 ===
This eclipse is a part of Saros series 151, repeating every 18 years, 11 days, and containing 72 events. The series started with a partial solar eclipse on August 14, 1776. It contains annular eclipses from February 28, 2101 through April 23, 2191; a hybrid eclipse on May 5, 2209; and total eclipses from May 16, 2227 through July 6, 2912. The series ends at member 72 as a partial eclipse on October 1, 3056. Its eclipses are tabulated in three columns; every third eclipse in the same column is one exeligmos apart, so they all cast shadows over approximately the same parts of the Earth.

The longest duration of annularity will be produced by member 19 at 2 minutes, 44 seconds on February 28, 2101, and the longest duration of totality will be produced by member 60 at 5 minutes, 41 seconds on May 22, 2840. All eclipses in this series occur at the Moon’s ascending node of orbit.

Series members 3–24 occur between 1801 and 2200:
3	4	5
September 5, 1812	September 17, 1830	September 27, 1848
6	7	8
October 8, 1866	October 19, 1884	October 31, 1902
9	10	11
November 10, 1920	November 21, 1938	December 2, 1956
12	13	14
December 13, 1974	December 24, 1992	January 4, 2011
15	16	17
January 14, 2029	January 26, 2047	February 5, 2065
18	19	20
February 16, 2083	February 28, 2101	March 11, 2119
21	22	23
March 21, 2137	April 2, 2155	April 12, 2173
24
April 23, 2191

=== Metonic series ===
The metonic series repeats eclipses every 19 years (6939.69 days), lasting about 5 cycles. Eclipses occur in nearly the same calendar date. In addition, the octon subseries repeats 1/5 of that or every 3.8 years (1387.94 days). All eclipses in this table occur at the Moon's ascending node.

22 eclipse events between December 13, 1898 and July 20, 1982
December 13–14	October 1–2	July 20–21	May 9	February 24–25
111	113	115	117	119
December 13, 1898		July 21, 1906	May 9, 1910	February 25, 1914
121	123	125	127	129
December 14, 1917	October 1, 1921	July 20, 1925	May 9, 1929	February 24, 1933
131	133	135	137	139
December 13, 1936	October 1, 1940	July 20, 1944	May 9, 1948	February 25, 1952
141	143	145	147	149
December 14, 1955	October 2, 1959	July 20, 1963	May 9, 1967	February 25, 1971
151	153	155		
December 13, 1974	October 2, 1978	July 20, 1982		

=== Tritos series ===
This eclipse is a part of a tritos cycle, repeating at alternating nodes every 135 synodic months (≈ 3986.63 days, or 11 years minus 1 month). Their appearance and longitude are irregular due to a lack of synchronization with the anomalistic month (period of perigee), but groupings of 3 tritos cycles (≈ 33 years minus 3 months) come close (≈ 434.044 anomalistic months), so eclipses are similar in these groupings.

The partial solar eclipse on November 4, 2116 (part of Saros 164) is also a part of this series but is not included in the table below.

Series members between 1801 and 2029
March 24, 1811 (Saros 136)	February 21, 1822 (Saros 137)	January 20, 1833 (Saros 138)	December 21, 1843 (Saros 139)	November 20, 1854 (Saros 140)
October 19, 1865 (Saros 141)	September 17, 1876 (Saros 142)	August 19, 1887 (Saros 143)	July 18, 1898 (Saros 144)	June 17, 1909 (Saros 145)
May 18, 1920 (Saros 146)	April 18, 1931 (Saros 147)	March 16, 1942 (Saros 148)	February 14, 1953 (Saros 149)	January 14, 1964 (Saros 150)
December 13, 1974 (Saros 151)	November 12, 1985 (Saros 152)	October 12, 1996 (Saros 153)	September 11, 2007 (Saros 154)	August 11, 2018 (Saros 155)
July 11, 2029 (Saros 156)

=== Inex series ===
This eclipse is a part of the long period inex cycle, repeating at alternating nodes, every 358 synodic months (≈ 10,571.95 days, or 29 years minus 20 days). Their appearance and longitude are irregular due to a lack of synchronization with the anomalistic month (period of perigee). However, groupings of 3 inex cycles (≈ 87 years minus 2 months) comes close (≈ 1,151.02 anomalistic months), so eclipses are similar in these groupings.

Series members between 1801 and 2200
April 13, 1801 (Saros 145)	March 24, 1830 (Saros 146)	March 4, 1859 (Saros 147)
February 11, 1888 (Saros 148)	January 23, 1917 (Saros 149)	January 3, 1946 (Saros 150)
December 13, 1974 (Saros 151)	November 23, 2003 (Saros 152)	November 3, 2032 (Saros 153)
October 13, 2061 (Saros 154)	September 23, 2090 (Saros 155)	September 5, 2119 (Saros 156)
August 14, 2148 (Saros 157)	July 25, 2177 (Saros 158)	
