= Solar Saros 151 =

Saros cycle series 151 for solar eclipses

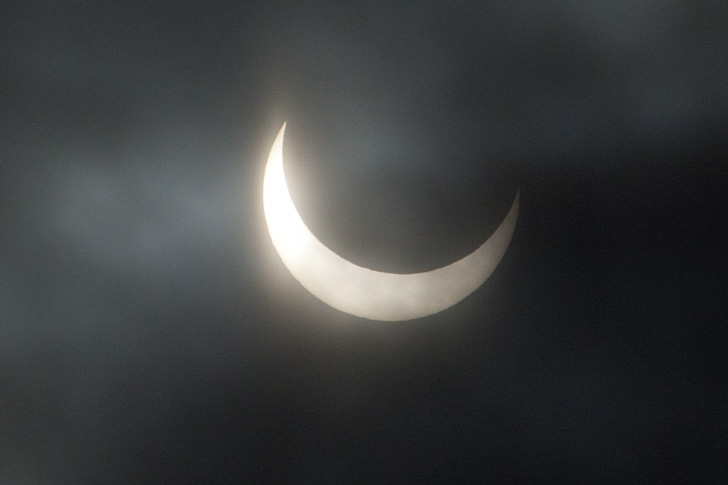
Partial, member 14, January 4, 2011 From Moscow, Russia

Animation of the series

Saros cycle series 151 for solar eclipses occurs at the Moon's ascending node, repeating every 18 years, 11 days, containing 72 eclipses, 46 of which will be umbral (6 annular, 1 hybrid, and 39 total). The first eclipse in the series was on 14 August 1776 and the last will be on 1 October 3056. The most recent eclipse was a partial eclipse on 4 January 2011 and the next will be a partial eclipse on 14 January 2029.

The longest totality will be 5 minutes 41 seconds on 22 May 2840 and the longest annular will be 2 minutes 44 seconds on 28 February 2101.

This solar saros is linked to Lunar Saros 144.

== Umbral eclipses ==
Umbral eclipses (annular, total and hybrid) can be further classified as either: 1) Central (two limits), 2) Central (one limit) or 3) Non-Central (one limit). The statistical distribution of these classes in Saros series 151 appears in the following table.

Classification	Number	Percent
All Umbral eclipses	46	100.00%
Central (two limits)	44	95.65%
Central (one limit)	2	4.35%
Non-central (one limit)	0	0.00%

== All eclipses ==
Saros	Member	Date	Time (Greatest) UTC	Type	Location Lat, Long	Gamma	Mag.	Width (km)	Duration (min:sec)	Ref
151	1	August 14, 1776	5:22:56	Partial	70.6N 123.5W	1.5357	0.0435			
151	2	August 25, 1794	12:08:56	Partial	71.3N 121.9E	1.4616	0.1709			
151	3	September 5, 1812	19:04:10	Partial	71.8N 4.5E	1.3939	0.2874			
151	4	September 17, 1830	2:08:12	Partial	72.1N 115.6W	1.3325	0.393			
151	5	September 27, 1848	9:21:19	Partial	72.2N 121.9E	1.2774	0.4875			
151	6	October 8, 1866	16:44:22	Partial	71.9N 3W	1.2296	0.5693			
151	7	October 19, 1884	0:17:42	Partial	71.5N 130.2W	1.1892	0.6385			
151	8	October 31, 1902	8:00:18	Partial	70.8N 100.8E	1.1556	0.696			
151	9	November 10, 1920	15:52:15	Partial	69.9N 29.8W	1.1287	0.742			
151	10	November 21, 1938	23:52:25	Partial	68.9N 162W	1.1077	0.7781			
151	11	December 2, 1956	8:00:35	Partial	67.9N 64.6E	1.0923	0.8047			
151	12	December 13, 1974	16:13:13	Partial	66.8N 69.4W	1.0797	0.8266			
151	13	December 24, 1992	0:31:41	Partial	65.7N 155.7E	1.0711	0.8422			
151	14	January 4, 2011	8:51:42	Partial	64.7N 20.8E	1.0627	0.8576			
151	15	January 14, 2029	17:13:48	Partial	63.7N 114.2W	1.0553	0.8714			
151	16	January 26, 2047	1:33:18	Partial	62.9N 111.7E	1.045	0.8907			
151	17	February 5, 2065	9:52:26	Partial	62.2N 21.9W	1.0336	0.9123			
151	18	February 16, 2083	18:06:36	Partial	61.6N 154.1W	1.017	0.9433			
151	19	February 28, 2101	2:16:26	Annular (Note: One limit)	60.5N 80E	0.9964	0.9609	-	2m 44s	
151	20	March 11, 2119	10:19:19	Annular	56.7N 29.2W	0.9693	0.9694	451	2m 13s	
151	21	March 21, 2137	18:16:38	Annular	55.6N 144.8W	0.9369	0.9769	233	1m 40s	
151	22	April 2, 2155	2:06:34	Annular	55.6N 101.3E	0.8975	0.9844	123	1m 7s	
151	23	April 12, 2173	9:49:40	Annular	56.2N 10.3W	0.8515	0.9919	53	0m 35s	
151	24	April 23, 2191	17:26:06	Annular	57N 119.2W	0.7991	0.9993	4	0m 3s	
151	25	May 5, 2209	0:56:53	Hybrid	57.7N 134.4E	0.7413	1.0065	34	0m 28s	
151	26	May 16, 2227	8:21:32	Total	57.7N 30.8E	0.6774	1.0135	63	0m 59s	
151	27	May 26, 2245	15:42:04	Total	56.7N 71.4W	0.6089	1.0201	86	1m 30s	
151	28	June 6, 2263	22:58:57	Total	54.4N 173.1W	0.5366	1.0261	105	2m 1s	
151	29	June 17, 2281	6:14:41	Total	50.8N 84.2E	0.4621	1.0316	121	2m 32s	
151	30	June 28, 2299	13:27:43	Total	46N 19.5W	0.3846	1.0365	133	3m 3s	
151	31	July 9, 2317	20:42:40	Total	40.4N 125.3W	0.3078	1.0406	143	3m 32s	
151	32	July 21, 2335	3:57:49	Total	34N 127.4E	0.2306	1.044	151	3m 58s	
151	33	July 31, 2353	11:17:06	Total	27.2N 17.8E	0.1559	1.0467	158	4m 20s	
151	34	August 11, 2371	18:38:04	Total	19.9N 93W	0.0821	1.0487	162	4m 36s	
151	35	August 22, 2389	2:05:53	Total	12.5N 153.9E	0.0133	1.05	166	4m 45s	
151	36	September 2, 2407	9:38:25	Total	5.1N 39.2E	-0.0517	1.0506	168	4m 48s	
151	37	September 12, 2425	17:18:07	Total	2.3S 77.5W	-0.1113	1.0507	169	4m 47s	
151	38	September 24, 2443	1:04:47	Total	9.6S 164.1E	-0.1656	1.0502	169	4m 39s	
151	39	October 4, 2461	9:00:22	Total	16.5S 43.7E	-0.2131	1.0495	168	4m 30s	
151	40	October 15, 2479	17:04:11	Total	23S 78.3W	-0.2538	1.0484	166	4m 18s	
151	41	October 26, 2497	1:15:23	Total	29.1S 158.5E	-0.2889	1.0472	164	4m 6s	
151	42	November 7, 2515	9:35:34	Total	34.4S 33.9E	-0.3169	1.0459	161	3m 53s	
151	43	November 17, 2533	18:03:10	Total	38.9S 91.5W	-0.3394	1.0448	159	3m 43s	
151	44	November 29, 2551	2:38:19	Total	42.3S 142.3E	-0.3559	1.0438	157	3m 34s	
151	45	December 9, 2569	11:18:32	Total	44.7S 15.8E	-0.3687	1.0431	155	3m 27s	
151	46	December 20, 2587	20:04:49	Total	45.6S 111.5W	-0.3767	1.0428	154	3m 22s	
151	47	January 1, 2606	4:53:56	Total	45.3S 120.5E	-0.3828	1.0428	155	3m 20s	
151	48	January 12, 2624	13:45:09	Total	43.8S 8.4W	-0.3874	1.0433	157	3m 21s	
151	49	January 22, 2642	22:36:33	Total	41.4S 138.1W	-0.3923	1.0443	160	3m 24s	
151	50	February 3, 2660	7:27:32	Total	38.2S 91.5E	-0.3977	1.0457	165	3m 30s	
151	51	February 13, 2678	16:14:59	Total	34.8S 38.7W	-0.4062	1.0475	172	3m 38s	
151	52	February 25, 2696	0:58:48	Total	31.1S 168.7W	-0.4179	1.0496	180	3m 48s	
151	53	March 8, 2714	9:37:13	Total	27.6S 62.3E	-0.4342	1.052	189	4m 1s	
151	54	March 18, 2732	18:10:35	Total	24.4S 65.8W	-0.4552	1.0544	200	4m 15s	
151	55	March 30, 2750	2:35:25	Total	21.8S 168.1E	-0.4832	1.057	212	4m 31s	
151	56	April 9, 2768	10:54:27	Total	19.9S 43.4E	-0.5162	1.0595	225	4m 48s	
151	57	April 20, 2786	19:04:46	Total	18.9S 79.1W	-0.5565	1.0617	240	5m 5s	
151	58	May 1, 2804	3:09:24	Total	19S 159.6E	-0.6018	1.0636	257	5m 21s	
151	59	May 12, 2822	11:04:34	Total	20.4S 40.6E	-0.6549	1.065	278	5m 34s	
151	60	May 22, 2840	18:55:22	Total	23.1S 77.7W	-0.7118	1.0657	303	5m 41s	
151	61	June 3, 2858	2:37:58	Total	27.6S 165.7E	-0.775	1.0656	338	5m 38s	
151	62	June 13, 2876	10:16:45	Total	33.8S 49.4E	-0.8414	1.0645	391	5m 25s	
151	63	June 24, 2894	17:49:14	Total	42.9S 66.3W	-0.9127	1.062	502	4m 55s	
151	64	July 6, 2912	1:20:07	Total (Note: One limit)	58.5S 176E	-0.9849	1.0568	-	3m 59s	
151	65	July 17, 2930	8:47:32	Partial	68.5S 53E	-1.0593	0.9063			
151	66	July 27, 2948	16:14:08	Partial	69.5S 69.8W	-1.1339	0.762			
151	67	August 7, 2966	23:40:32	Partial	70.3S 166.9E	-1.2079	0.6193			
151	68	August 18, 2984	7:08:25	Partial	71.1S 42.6E	-1.28	0.481			
151	69	August 30, 3002	14:38:31	Partial	71.6S 82.8W	-1.3497	0.481			
151	70	September 9, 3020	22:11:39	Partial	72.0S 150.7E	-1.4162	0.481			
151	71	September 21, 3038	5:49:43	Partial	72.2S 22.7E	-1.4781	0.481			
151	72	October 1, 3056	13:33:09	Partial	72.1S 106.6W	-1.5349	0.481			
