= December 2030 lunar eclipse =

Astronomical event

- Penumbral eclipse
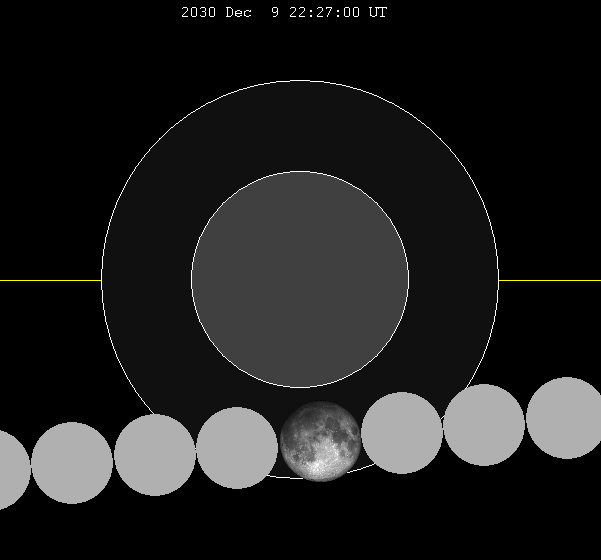
- The Moon's hourly motion shown right to left
- Date: December 9, 2030
- Gamma: −1.0732
- Magnitude: −0.1613
- Saros cycle: 145 (12 of 71)
- Penumbral: 279 minutes, 13 seconds
Contacts (UTC)
- P1: 20:07:56
- Greatest: 22:28:51
- P4: 0:47:09

A penumbral lunar eclipse will occur at the Moon’s descending node of orbit on Monday, December 9, 2030, with an umbral magnitude of −0.1613. A lunar eclipse occurs when the Moon moves into the Earth's shadow, causing the Moon to be darkened. A penumbral lunar eclipse occurs when part or all of the Moon's near side passes into the Earth's penumbra. Unlike a solar eclipse, which can only be viewed from a relatively small area of the world, a lunar eclipse may be viewed from anywhere on the night side of Earth. Occurring only about 7.5 hours before apogee (on December 10, 2030, at 5:05 UTC), the Moon's apparent diameter will be smaller.

== Visibility ==
The eclipse will be completely visible over Africa, Europe, and north, west, central, and south Asia, seen rising over North and South America and setting over east Asia and western Australia.

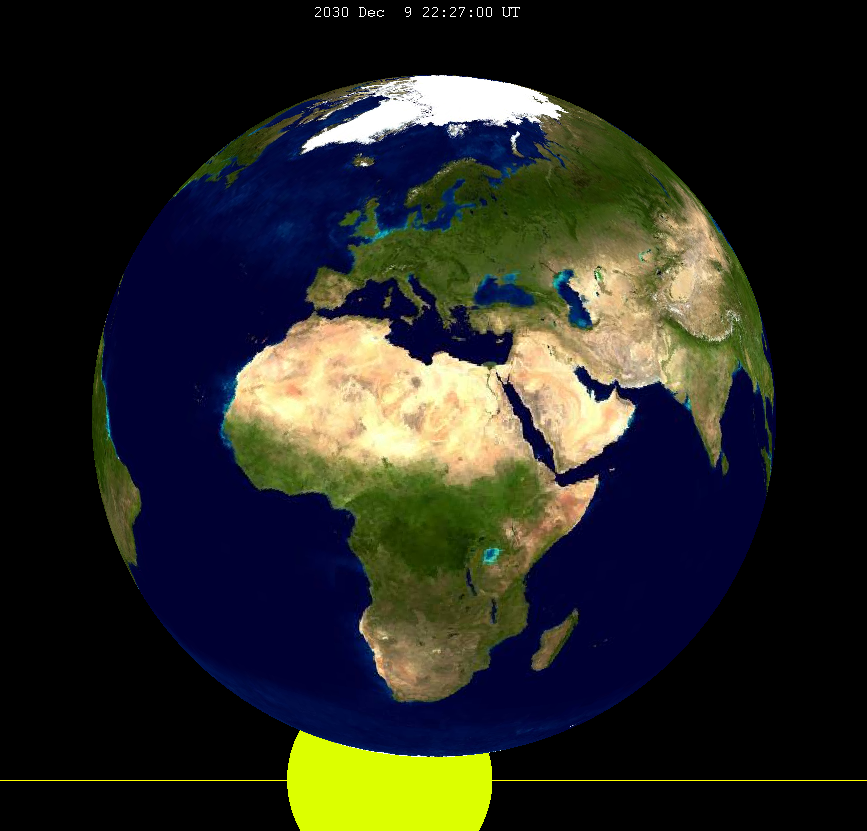
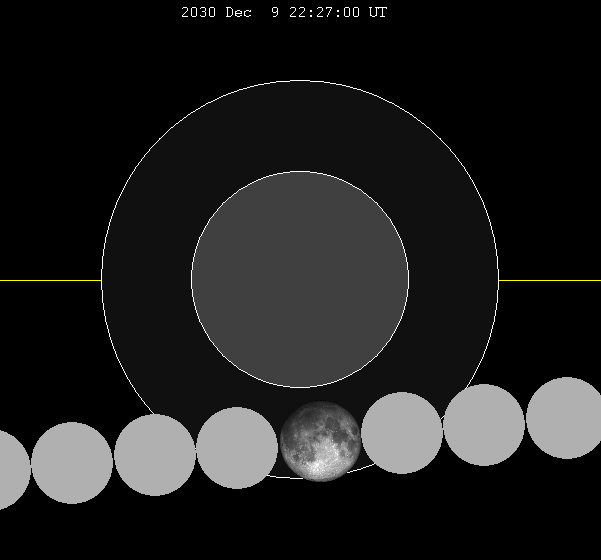

== Eclipse details ==
Shown below is a table displaying details about this particular solar eclipse. It describes various parameters pertaining to this eclipse.

December 9, 2030 Lunar Eclipse Parameters
Parameter	Value
Penumbral Magnitude	0.94302
Umbral Magnitude	−0.16133
Gamma	−1.07315
Sun Right Ascension	17h07m21.3s
Sun Declination	-22°52'57.8"
Sun Semi-Diameter	16'14.4"
Sun Equatorial Horizontal Parallax	08.9"
Moon Right Ascension	05h07m19.1s
Moon Declination	+21°55'03.1"
Moon Semi-Diameter	14'42.3"
Moon Equatorial Horizontal Parallax	0°53'58.2"
ΔT	74.3 s

== Eclipse season ==
This eclipse is part of an eclipse season, a period, roughly every six months, when eclipses occur. Only two (or occasionally three) eclipse seasons occur each year, and each season lasts about 35 days and repeats just short of six months (173 days) later; thus two full eclipse seasons always occur each year. Either two or three eclipses happen each eclipse season. In the sequence below, each eclipse is separated by a fortnight.

Eclipse season of November–December 2030
November 25 Ascending node (new moon)	December 9 Descending node (full moon)
Total solar eclipse Solar Saros 133	Penumbral lunar eclipse Lunar Saros 145

== Related eclipses ==
=== Eclipses in 2030 ===
- An annular solar eclipse on June 1.
- A partial lunar eclipse on June 15.
- A total solar eclipse on November 25.
- A penumbral lunar eclipse on December 9.

=== Metonic ===
- Preceded by: Lunar eclipse of February 20, 2027
- Followed by: Lunar eclipse of September 28, 2034

=== Tzolkinex ===
- Preceded by: Lunar eclipse of October 28, 2023
- Followed by: Lunar eclipse of January 21, 2038

=== Half-Saros ===
- Preceded by: Solar eclipse of December 4, 2021
- Followed by: Solar eclipse of December 15, 2039

=== Tritos ===
- Preceded by: Lunar eclipse of January 10, 2020
- Followed by: Lunar eclipse of November 8, 2041

=== Lunar Saros 145 ===
- Preceded by: Lunar eclipse of November 28, 2012
- Followed by: Lunar eclipse of December 20, 2048

=== Inex ===
- Preceded by: Lunar eclipse of December 30, 2001
- Followed by: Lunar eclipse of November 19, 2059

=== Triad ===
- Preceded by: Lunar eclipse of February 9, 1944
- Followed by: Lunar eclipse of October 10, 2117

=== Lunar eclipses of 2027–2031 ===
This eclipse is a member of a semester series. An eclipse in a semester series of lunar eclipses repeats approximately every 177 days and 4 hours (a semester) at alternating nodes of the Moon's orbit.

The penumbral lunar eclipses on February 20, 2027 and August 17, 2027 occur in the previous lunar year eclipse set, and the penumbral lunar eclipses on May 7, 2031 and October 30, 2031 occur in the next lunar year eclipse set.

Lunar eclipse series sets from 2027 to 2031
Ascending node				Descending node			
Saros	Date Viewing	Type Chart	Gamma	Saros	Date Viewing	Type Chart	Gamma
110	2027 Jul 18	Penumbral	−1.5759	115	2028 Jan 12	Partial	0.9818
120	2028 Jul 06	Partial	−0.7904	125	2028 Dec 31	Total	0.3258
130	2029 Jun 26	Total	0.0124	135	2029 Dec 20	Total	−0.3811
140	2030 Jun 15	Partial	0.7535	145	2030 Dec 09	Penumbral	−1.0732
150	2031 Jun 05	Penumbral	1.4732				

=== Saros 145 ===
This eclipse is a part of Saros series 145, repeating every 18 years, 11 days, and containing 71 events. The series started with a penumbral lunar eclipse on August 11, 1832. It contains partial eclipses from February 24, 2157 through June 3, 2319; total eclipses from June 14, 2337 through November 13, 2589; and a second set of partial eclipses from November 25, 2607 through June 21, 2950. The series ends at member 71 as a penumbral eclipse on September 16, 3094.

The longest duration of totality will be produced by member 34 at 104 minutes, 21 seconds on August 7, 2427. All eclipses in this series occur at the Moon’s descending node of orbit.

Greatest	First			
The greatest eclipse of the series will occur on 2427 Aug 07, lasting 104 minutes, 21 seconds.	Penumbral	Partial	Total	Central
The greatest eclipse of the series will occur on 2427 Aug 07, lasting 104 minutes, 21 seconds.	1832 Aug 11	2157 Feb 24	2337 Jun 14	2373 Jul 05
The greatest eclipse of the series will occur on 2427 Aug 07, lasting 104 minutes, 21 seconds.	Last			
The greatest eclipse of the series will occur on 2427 Aug 07, lasting 104 minutes, 21 seconds.	Central	Total	Partial	Penumbral
The greatest eclipse of the series will occur on 2427 Aug 07, lasting 104 minutes, 21 seconds.	2499 Sep 19	2589 Nov 13	2950 Jun 21	3094 Sep 16

Eclipses are tabulated in three columns; every third eclipse in the same column is one exeligmos apart, so they all cast shadows over approximately the same parts of the Earth.

Series members 1–21 occur between 1832 and 2200:
1	2	3
1832 Aug 11	1850 Aug 22	1868 Sep 02
4	5	6
1886 Sep 13	1904 Sep 24	1922 Oct 06
7	8	9
1940 Oct 16	1958 Oct 27	1976 Nov 06
10	11	12
1994 Nov 18	2012 Nov 28	2030 Dec 09
13	14	15
2048 Dec 20	2066 Dec 31	2085 Jan 10
16	17	18
2103 Jan 23	2121 Feb 02	2139 Feb 13
19	20	21
2157 Feb 24	2175 Mar 07	2193 Mar 17

=== Tritos series ===
This eclipse is a part of a tritos cycle, repeating at alternating nodes every 135 synodic months (≈ 3986.63 days, or 11 years minus 1 month). Their appearance and longitude are irregular due to a lack of synchronization with the anomalistic month (period of perigee), but groupings of 3 tritos cycles (≈ 33 years minus 3 months) come close (≈ 434.044 anomalistic months), so eclipses are similar in these groupings.

Series members between 1801 and 2183
1801 Sep 22 (Saros 124)	1812 Aug 22 (Saros 125)	1823 Jul 23 (Saros 126)	1834 Jun 21 (Saros 127)	1845 May 21 (Saros 128)
1856 Apr 20 (Saros 129)	1867 Mar 20 (Saros 130)	1878 Feb 17 (Saros 131)	1889 Jan 17 (Saros 132)	1899 Dec 17 (Saros 133)
1910 Nov 17 (Saros 134)	1921 Oct 16 (Saros 135)	1932 Sep 14 (Saros 136)	1943 Aug 15 (Saros 137)	1954 Jul 16 (Saros 138)
1965 Jun 14 (Saros 139)	1976 May 13 (Saros 140)	1987 Apr 14 (Saros 141)	1998 Mar 13 (Saros 142)	2009 Feb 09 (Saros 143)
2020 Jan 10 (Saros 144)	2030 Dec 09 (Saros 145)	2041 Nov 08 (Saros 146)	2052 Oct 08 (Saros 147)	2063 Sep 07 (Saros 148)
2074 Aug 07 (Saros 149)	2085 Jul 07 (Saros 150)	2096 Jun 06 (Saros 151)	2107 May 07 (Saros 152)	
		2151 Jan 02 (Saros 156)		2172 Oct 31 (Saros 158)
2183 Oct 01 (Saros 159)

=== Inex series ===
This eclipse is a part of the long period inex cycle, repeating at alternating nodes, every 358 synodic months (≈ 10,571.95 days, or 29 years minus 20 days). Their appearance and longitude are irregular due to a lack of synchronization with the anomalistic month (period of perigee). However, groupings of 3 inex cycles (≈ 87 years minus 2 months) comes close (≈ 1,151.02 anomalistic months), so eclipses are similar in these groupings.

Series members between 1801 and 2200
1828 Apr 29 (Saros 138)	1857 Apr 09 (Saros 139)	1886 Mar 20 (Saros 140)
1915 Mar 01 (Saros 141)	1944 Feb 09 (Saros 142)	1973 Jan 18 (Saros 143)
2001 Dec 30 (Saros 144)	2030 Dec 09 (Saros 145)	2059 Nov 19 (Saros 146)
2088 Oct 30 (Saros 147)	2117 Oct 10 (Saros 148)	2146 Sep 20 (Saros 149)
2175 Aug 31 (Saros 150)

=== Half-Saros cycle ===
A lunar eclipse will be preceded and followed by solar eclipses by 9 years and 5.5 days (a half saros). This lunar eclipse is related to two total solar eclipses of Solar Saros 152.

December 4, 2021	December 15, 2039

== See also ==
- List of lunar eclipses and List of 21st-century lunar eclipses
