= October 1940 lunar eclipse =

Penumbral lunar eclipse October 16, 1940

- Penumbral eclipse
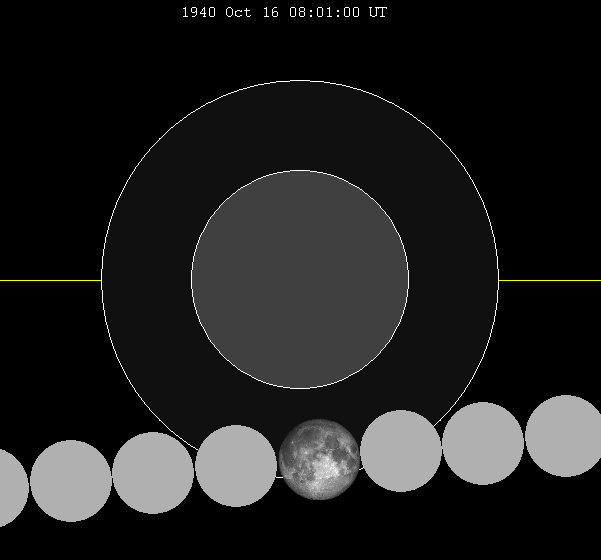
- The Moon's hourly motion shown right to left
- Date: October 16, 1940
- Gamma: −1.1925
- Magnitude: −0.3749
- Saros cycle: 145 (7 of 71)
- Penumbral: 247 minutes, 58 seconds
Contacts (UTC)
- P1: 5:56:54
- Greatest: 8:00:53
- P4: 10:04:52

A penumbral lunar eclipse occurred at the Moon’s descending node of orbit on Wednesday, October 16, 1940, with an umbral magnitude of −0.3749. A lunar eclipse occurs when the Moon moves into the Earth's shadow, causing the Moon to be darkened. A penumbral lunar eclipse occurs when part or all of the Moon's near side passes into the Earth's penumbra. Unlike a solar eclipse, which can only be viewed from a relatively small area of the world, a lunar eclipse may be viewed from anywhere on the night side of Earth. Occurring only about 21 hours after apogee (on October 15, 1940, at 11:00 UTC), the Moon's apparent diameter was smaller.

== Visibility ==
The eclipse was completely visible over North America and western South America, seen rising over East Asia and Australia and setting over eastern South America, West Africa, and Western Europe.

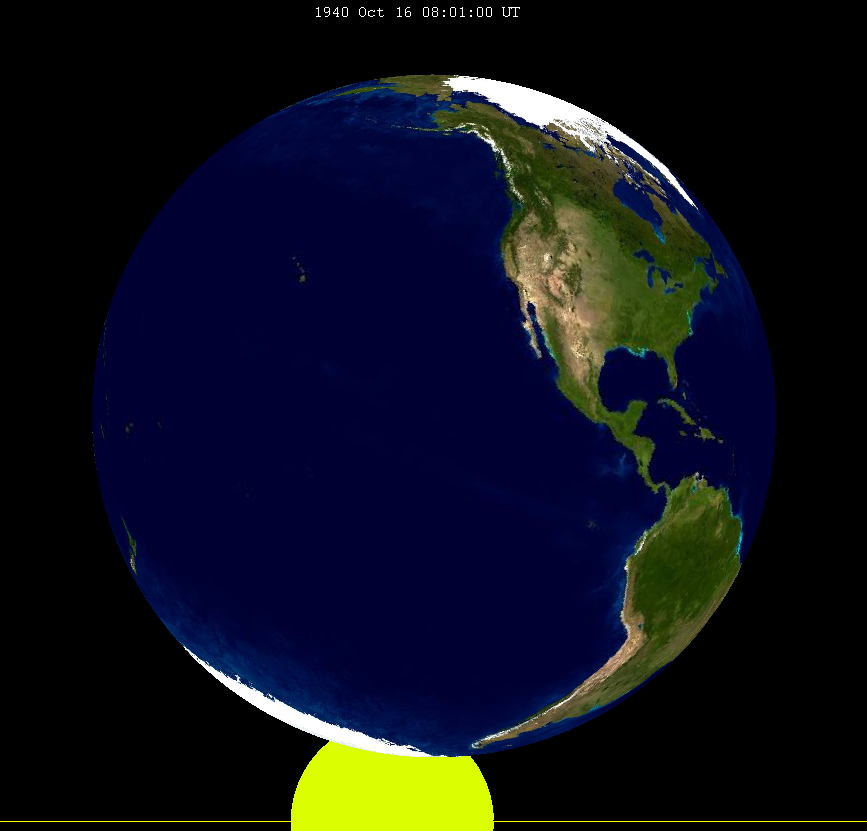
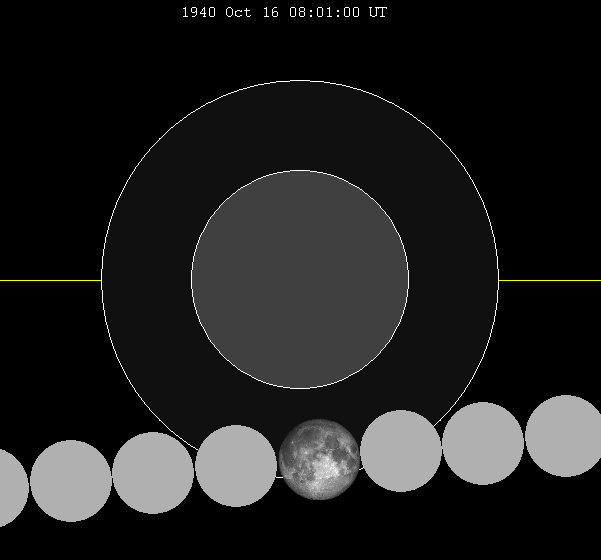

== Eclipse details ==
Shown below is a table displaying details about this particular solar eclipse. It describes various parameters pertaining to this eclipse.

October 16, 1940 Lunar Eclipse Parameters
Parameter	Value
Penumbral Magnitude	0.71567
Umbral Magnitude	−0.37489
Gamma	−1.19248
Sun Right Ascension	13h24m23.2s
Sun Declination	-08°52'19.1"
Sun Semi-Diameter	16'03.0"
Sun Equatorial Horizontal Parallax	08.8"
Moon Right Ascension	01h25m35.5s
Moon Declination	+07°50'26.8"
Moon Semi-Diameter	14'43.0"
Moon Equatorial Horizontal Parallax	0°54'00.7"
ΔT	24.7 s

== Eclipse season ==
This eclipse is part of an eclipse season, a period, roughly every six months, when eclipses occur. Only two (or occasionally three) eclipse seasons occur each year, and each season lasts about 35 days and repeats just short of six months (173 days) later; thus two full eclipse seasons always occur each year. Either two or three eclipses happen each eclipse season. In the sequence below, each eclipse is separated by a fortnight.

Eclipse season of October 1940
October 1 Ascending node (new moon)	October 16 Descending node (full moon)
Total solar eclipse Solar Saros 133	Penumbral lunar eclipse Lunar Saros 145

== Related eclipses ==
=== Eclipses in 1940 ===
- A penumbral lunar eclipse on March 23.
- An annular solar eclipse on April 7.
- A penumbral lunar eclipse on April 22.
- A total solar eclipse on October 1.
- A penumbral lunar eclipse on October 16.

=== Metonic ===
- Preceded by: Lunar eclipse of December 28, 1936
- Followed by: Lunar eclipse of August 4, 1944

=== Tzolkinex ===
- Preceded by: Lunar eclipse of September 4, 1933
- Followed by: Lunar eclipse of November 28, 1947

=== Half-Saros ===
- Preceded by: Solar eclipse of October 11, 1931
- Followed by: Solar eclipse of October 21, 1949

=== Tritos ===
- Preceded by: Lunar eclipse of November 17, 1929
- Followed by: Lunar eclipse of September 15, 1951

=== Lunar Saros 145 ===
- Preceded by: Lunar eclipse of October 6, 1922
- Followed by: Lunar eclipse of October 27, 1958

=== Inex ===
- Preceded by: Lunar eclipse of November 6, 1911
- Followed by: Lunar eclipse of September 25, 1969

=== Triad ===
- Preceded by: Lunar eclipse of December 15, 1853
- Followed by: Lunar eclipse of August 17, 2027

=== Lunar eclipses of 1937–1940 ===
This eclipse is a member of a semester series. An eclipse in a semester series of lunar eclipses repeats approximately every 177 days and 4 hours (a semester) at alternating nodes of the Moon's orbit.

The penumbral lunar eclipse on March 23, 1940 occurs in the next lunar year eclipse set.

Lunar eclipse series sets from 1937 to 1940
Ascending node				Descending node			
Saros	Date Viewing	Type Chart	Gamma	Saros	Date Viewing	Type Chart	Gamma
110	1937 May 25	Penumbral	−1.1582	115	1937 Nov 18	Partial	0.9421
120	1938 May 14	Total	−0.3994	125	1938 Nov 07	Total	0.2739
130	1939 May 03	Total	0.3693	135	1939 Oct 28	Partial	−0.4581
140	1940 Apr 22	Penumbral	1.0741	145	1940 Oct 16	Penumbral	−1.1925

=== Saros 145 ===
This eclipse is a part of Saros series 145, repeating every 18 years, 11 days, and containing 71 events. The series started with a penumbral lunar eclipse on August 11, 1832. It contains partial eclipses from February 24, 2157 through June 3, 2319; total eclipses from June 14, 2337 through November 13, 2589; and a second set of partial eclipses from November 25, 2607 through June 21, 2950. The series ends at member 71 as a penumbral eclipse on September 16, 3094.

The longest duration of totality will be produced by member 34 at 104 minutes, 21 seconds on August 7, 2427. All eclipses in this series occur at the Moon’s descending node of orbit.

Greatest	First			
The greatest eclipse of the series will occur on 2427 Aug 07, lasting 104 minutes, 21 seconds.	Penumbral	Partial	Total	Central
The greatest eclipse of the series will occur on 2427 Aug 07, lasting 104 minutes, 21 seconds.	1832 Aug 11	2157 Feb 24	2337 Jun 14	2373 Jul 05
The greatest eclipse of the series will occur on 2427 Aug 07, lasting 104 minutes, 21 seconds.	Last			
The greatest eclipse of the series will occur on 2427 Aug 07, lasting 104 minutes, 21 seconds.	Central	Total	Partial	Penumbral
The greatest eclipse of the series will occur on 2427 Aug 07, lasting 104 minutes, 21 seconds.	2499 Sep 19	2589 Nov 13	2950 Jun 21	3094 Sep 16

Eclipses are tabulated in three columns; every third eclipse in the same column is one exeligmos apart, so they all cast shadows over approximately the same parts of the Earth.

Series members 1–21 occur between 1832 and 2200:
1	2	3
1832 Aug 11	1850 Aug 22	1868 Sep 02
4	5	6
1886 Sep 13	1904 Sep 24	1922 Oct 06
7	8	9
1940 Oct 16	1958 Oct 27	1976 Nov 06
10	11	12
1994 Nov 18	2012 Nov 28	2030 Dec 09
13	14	15
2048 Dec 20	2066 Dec 31	2085 Jan 10
16	17	18
2103 Jan 23	2121 Feb 02	2139 Feb 13
19	20	21
2157 Feb 24	2175 Mar 07	2193 Mar 17

=== Tritos series ===
This eclipse is a part of a tritos cycle, repeating at alternating nodes every 135 synodic months (≈ 3986.63 days, or 11 years minus 1 month). Their appearance and longitude are irregular due to a lack of synchronization with the anomalistic month (period of perigee), but groupings of 3 tritos cycles (≈ 33 years minus 3 months) come close (≈ 434.044 anomalistic months), so eclipses are similar in these groupings.

Series members between 1801 and 2060
1809 Oct 23 (Saros 133)	1820 Sep 22 (Saros 134)	1831 Aug 23 (Saros 135)	1842 Jul 22 (Saros 136)	1853 Jun 21 (Saros 137)
1864 May 21 (Saros 138)	1875 Apr 20 (Saros 139)	1886 Mar 20 (Saros 140)	1897 Feb 17 (Saros 141)	1908 Jan 18 (Saros 142)
1918 Dec 17 (Saros 143)	1929 Nov 17 (Saros 144)	1940 Oct 16 (Saros 145)	1951 Sep 15 (Saros 146)	1962 Aug 15 (Saros 147)
1973 Jul 15 (Saros 148)	1984 Jun 13 (Saros 149)			
			2060 Nov 08 (Saros 156)	

=== Inex series ===
This eclipse is a part of the long period inex cycle, repeating at alternating nodes, every 358 synodic months (≈ 10,571.95 days, or 29 years minus 20 days). Their appearance and longitude are irregular due to a lack of synchronization with the anomalistic month (period of perigee). However, groupings of 3 inex cycles (≈ 87 years minus 2 months) comes close (≈ 1,151.02 anomalistic months), so eclipses are similar in these groupings.

Series members between 1801 and 2200
1825 Jan 04 (Saros 141)	1853 Dec 15 (Saros 142)	1882 Nov 25 (Saros 143)
1911 Nov 06 (Saros 144)	1940 Oct 16 (Saros 145)	1969 Sep 25 (Saros 146)
1998 Sep 06 (Saros 147)	2027 Aug 17 (Saros 148)	2056 Jul 26 (Saros 149)
2085 Jul 07 (Saros 150)	2114 Jun 18 (Saros 151)	2143 May 28 (Saros 152)
2172 May 08 (Saros 153)

=== Half-Saros cycle ===
A lunar eclipse will be preceded and followed by solar eclipses by 9 years and 5.5 days (a half saros). This lunar eclipse is related to two partial solar eclipses of Solar Saros 152.

October 11, 1931	October 21, 1949

== See also ==
- List of lunar eclipses
- List of 20th-century lunar eclipses
