= December 2048 lunar eclipse =

Astronomical event

- Penumbral eclipse
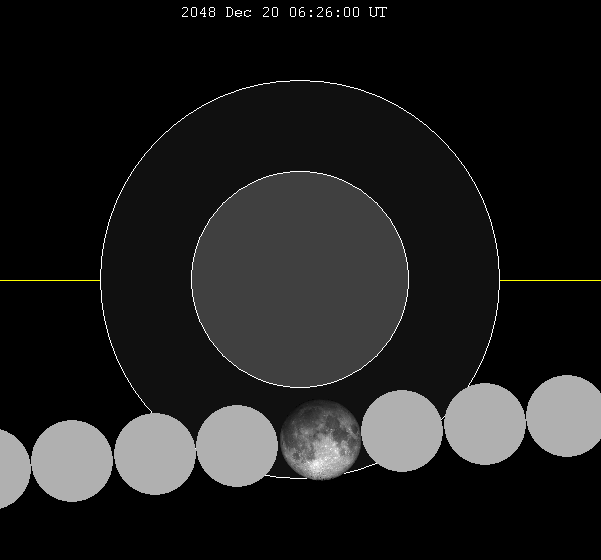
- The Moon's hourly motion shown right to left
- Date: December 20, 2048
- Gamma: −1.0624
- Magnitude: −0.1420
- Saros cycle: 145 (13 of 71)
- Penumbral: 281 minutes, 36 seconds
Contacts (UTC)
- P1: 4:05:28
- Greatest: 6:26:16
- P4: 8:47:04

A penumbral lunar eclipse will occur at the Moon’s descending node of orbit on Sunday, December 20, 2048, with an umbral magnitude of −0.1420. A lunar eclipse occurs when the Moon moves into the Earth's shadow, causing the Moon to be darkened. A penumbral lunar eclipse occurs when part or all of the Moon's near side passes into the Earth's penumbra. Unlike a solar eclipse, which can only be viewed from a relatively small area of the world, a lunar eclipse may be viewed from anywhere on the night side of Earth. Occurring only about 13 hours before apogee (on December 20, 2048, at 19:30 UTC), the Moon's apparent diameter will be smaller.

== Visibility ==
The eclipse will be completely visible over North America and much of South America, seen rising over northeast Asia and the western Pacific Ocean and setting over west and central Africa and Europe.

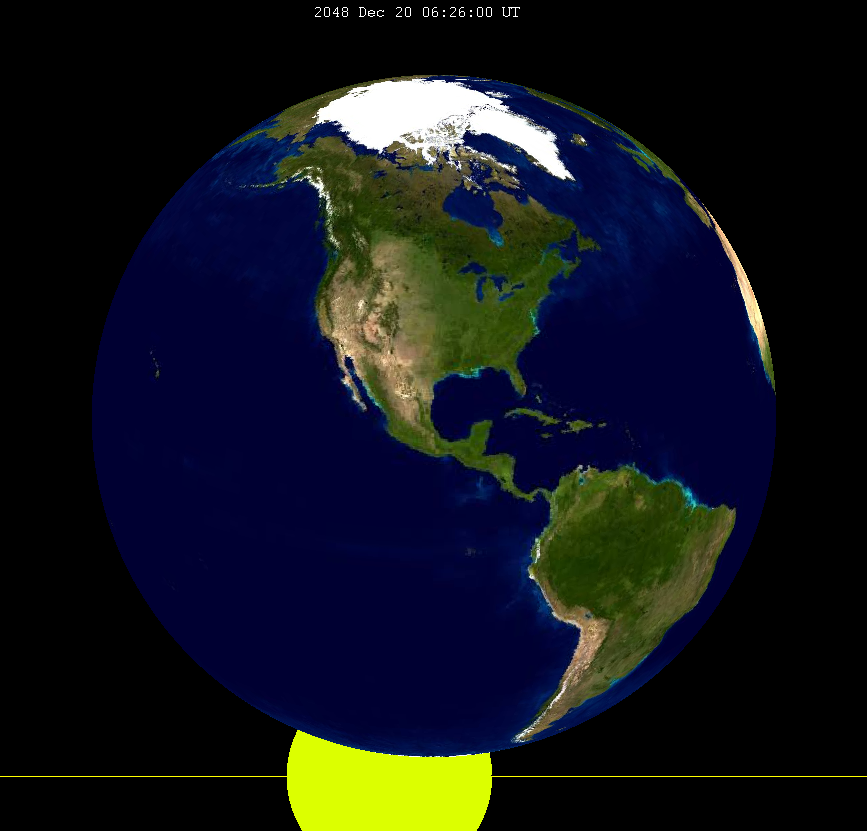
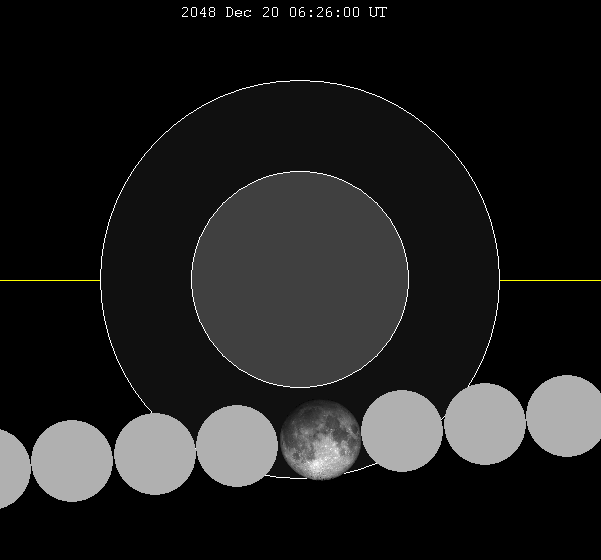

== Eclipse details ==
Shown below is a table displaying details about this particular solar eclipse. It describes various parameters pertaining to this eclipse.

December 20, 2048 Lunar Eclipse Parameters
Parameter	Value
Penumbral Magnitude	0.96321
Umbral Magnitude	−0.14202
Gamma	−1.06244
Sun Right Ascension	17h55m49.3s
Sun Declination	-23°25'43.8"
Sun Semi-Diameter	16'15.4"
Sun Equatorial Horizontal Parallax	08.9"
Moon Right Ascension	05h55m26.5s
Moon Declination	+22°28'37.2"
Moon Semi-Diameter	14'42.6"
Moon Equatorial Horizontal Parallax	0°53'59.0"
ΔT	84.4 s

== Eclipse season ==
This eclipse is part of an eclipse season, a period, roughly every six months, when eclipses occur. Only two (or occasionally three) eclipse seasons occur each year, and each season lasts about 35 days and repeats just short of six months (173 days) later; thus two full eclipse seasons always occur each year. Either two or three eclipses happen each eclipse season. In the sequence below, each eclipse is separated by a fortnight.

Eclipse season of December 2048
December 5 Ascending node (new moon)	December 20 Descending node (full moon)
Total solar eclipse Solar Saros 133	Penumbral lunar eclipse Lunar Saros 145

== Related eclipses ==
=== Eclipses in 2048 ===
- A total lunar eclipse on January 1.
- An annular solar eclipse on June 11.
- A partial lunar eclipse on June 26.
- A total solar eclipse on December 5.
- A penumbral lunar eclipse on December 20.

=== Metonic ===
- Preceded by: Lunar eclipse of March 3, 2045
- Followed by: Lunar eclipse of October 8, 2052

=== Tzolkinex ===
- Preceded by: Lunar eclipse of November 8, 2041
- Followed by: Lunar eclipse of February 1, 2056

=== Half-Saros ===
- Preceded by: Solar eclipse of December 15, 2039
- Followed by: Solar eclipse of December 26, 2057

=== Tritos ===
- Preceded by: Lunar eclipse of January 21, 2038
- Followed by: Lunar eclipse of November 19, 2059

=== Lunar Saros 145 ===
- Preceded by: Lunar eclipse of December 9, 2030
- Followed by: Lunar eclipse of December 31, 2066

=== Inex ===
- Preceded by: Lunar eclipse of January 10, 2020
- Followed by: Lunar eclipse of November 29, 2077

=== Triad ===
- Preceded by: Lunar eclipse of February 19, 1962
- Followed by: Lunar eclipse of October 22, 2135

=== Lunar eclipses of 2046–2049 ===
This eclipse is a member of a semester series. An eclipse in a semester series of lunar eclipses repeats approximately every 177 days and 4 hours (a semester) at alternating nodes of the Moon's orbit.

The penumbral lunar eclipses on May 17, 2049 and November 9, 2049 occur in the next lunar year eclipse set.

Lunar eclipse series sets from 2046 to 2049
Descending node				Ascending node			
Saros	Date Viewing	Type Chart	Gamma	Saros	Date Viewing	Type Chart	Gamma
115	2046 Jan 22	Partial	0.9885	120	2046 Jul 18	Partial	−0.8691
125	2047 Jan 12	Total	0.3317	130	2047 Jul 07	Total	−0.0636
135	2048 Jan 01	Total	−0.3745	140	2048 Jun 26	Partial	0.6796
145	2048 Dec 20	Penumbral	−1.0624	150	2049 Jun 15	Penumbral	1.4068

=== Metonic series ===
The Metonic cycle repeats nearly exactly every 19 years and represents a Saros cycle plus one lunar year. Because it occurs on the same calendar date, the Earth's shadow will be in nearly the same location relative to the background stars.

Ascending node	Descending node
1. 1991 Jun 27 - penumbral (110); 2. 2010 Jun 26 - partial (120); 3. 2029 Jun 26 - total (130); 4. 2048 Jun 26 - partial (140); 5. 2067 Jun 27 - penumbral (150)	1. 1991 Dec 21 - partial (115); 2. 2010 Dec 21 - total (125); 3. 2029 Dec 20 - total (135); 4. 2048 Dec 20 - partial (145)

=== Saros 145 ===
This eclipse is a part of Saros series 145, repeating every 18 years, 11 days, and containing 71 events. The series started with a penumbral lunar eclipse on August 11, 1832. It contains partial eclipses from February 24, 2157 through June 3, 2319; total eclipses from June 14, 2337 through November 13, 2589; and a second set of partial eclipses from November 25, 2607 through June 21, 2950. The series ends at member 71 as a penumbral eclipse on September 16, 3094.

The longest duration of totality will be produced by member 34 at 104 minutes, 21 seconds on August 7, 2427. All eclipses in this series occur at the Moon’s descending node of orbit.

Greatest	First			
The greatest eclipse of the series will occur on 2427 Aug 07, lasting 104 minutes, 21 seconds.	Penumbral	Partial	Total	Central
The greatest eclipse of the series will occur on 2427 Aug 07, lasting 104 minutes, 21 seconds.	1832 Aug 11	2157 Feb 24	2337 Jun 14	2373 Jul 05
The greatest eclipse of the series will occur on 2427 Aug 07, lasting 104 minutes, 21 seconds.	Last			
The greatest eclipse of the series will occur on 2427 Aug 07, lasting 104 minutes, 21 seconds.	Central	Total	Partial	Penumbral
The greatest eclipse of the series will occur on 2427 Aug 07, lasting 104 minutes, 21 seconds.	2499 Sep 19	2589 Nov 13	2950 Jun 21	3094 Sep 16

Eclipses are tabulated in three columns; every third eclipse in the same column is one exeligmos apart, so they all cast shadows over approximately the same parts of the Earth.

Series members 1–21 occur between 1832 and 2200:
1	2	3
1832 Aug 11	1850 Aug 22	1868 Sep 02
4	5	6
1886 Sep 13	1904 Sep 24	1922 Oct 06
7	8	9
1940 Oct 16	1958 Oct 27	1976 Nov 06
10	11	12
1994 Nov 18	2012 Nov 28	2030 Dec 09
13	14	15
2048 Dec 20	2066 Dec 31	2085 Jan 10
16	17	18
2103 Jan 23	2121 Feb 02	2139 Feb 13
19	20	21
2157 Feb 24	2175 Mar 07	2193 Mar 17

=== Tritos series ===
This eclipse is a part of a tritos cycle, repeating at alternating nodes every 135 synodic months (≈ 3986.63 days, or 11 years minus 1 month). Their appearance and longitude are irregular due to a lack of synchronization with the anomalistic month (period of perigee), but groupings of 3 tritos cycles (≈ 33 years minus 3 months) come close (≈ 434.044 anomalistic months), so eclipses are similar in these groupings.

Series members between 1801 and 2200
1808 Nov 03 (Saros 123)	1819 Oct 03 (Saros 124)	1830 Sep 02 (Saros 125)	1841 Aug 02 (Saros 126)	1852 Jul 01 (Saros 127)
1863 Jun 01 (Saros 128)	1874 May 01 (Saros 129)	1885 Mar 30 (Saros 130)	1896 Feb 28 (Saros 131)	1907 Jan 29 (Saros 132)
1917 Dec 28 (Saros 133)	1928 Nov 27 (Saros 134)	1939 Oct 28 (Saros 135)	1950 Sep 26 (Saros 136)	1961 Aug 26 (Saros 137)
1972 Jul 26 (Saros 138)	1983 Jun 25 (Saros 139)	1994 May 25 (Saros 140)	2005 Apr 24 (Saros 141)	2016 Mar 23 (Saros 142)
2027 Feb 20 (Saros 143)	2038 Jan 21 (Saros 144)	2048 Dec 20 (Saros 145)	2059 Nov 19 (Saros 146)	2070 Oct 19 (Saros 147)
2081 Sep 18 (Saros 148)	2092 Aug 17 (Saros 149)	2103 Jul 19 (Saros 150)	2114 Jun 18 (Saros 151)	2125 May 17 (Saros 152)
2136 Apr 16 (Saros 153)			2169 Jan 13 (Saros 156)	
2190 Nov 12 (Saros 158)

=== Inex series ===
This eclipse is a part of the long period inex cycle, repeating at alternating nodes, every 358 synodic months (≈ 10,571.95 days, or 29 years minus 20 days). Their appearance and longitude are irregular due to a lack of synchronization with the anomalistic month (period of perigee). However, groupings of 3 inex cycles (≈ 87 years minus 2 months) comes close (≈ 1,151.02 anomalistic months), so eclipses are similar in these groupings.

Series members between 1801 and 2200
1817 May 30 (Saros 137)	1846 May 11 (Saros 138)	1875 Apr 20 (Saros 139)
1904 Mar 31 (Saros 140)	1933 Mar 12 (Saros 141)	1962 Feb 19 (Saros 142)
1991 Jan 30 (Saros 143)	2020 Jan 10 (Saros 144)	2048 Dec 20 (Saros 145)
2077 Nov 29 (Saros 146)	2106 Nov 11 (Saros 147)	2135 Oct 22 (Saros 148)
2164 Sep 30 (Saros 149)	2193 Sep 11 (Saros 150)	

=== Half-Saros cycle ===
A lunar eclipse will be preceded and followed by solar eclipses by 9 years and 5.5 days (a half saros). This lunar eclipse is related to two total solar eclipses of Solar Saros 152.

December 15, 2039	December 26, 2057

== See also ==
- List of lunar eclipses and List of 21st-century lunar eclipses
