= Lunar Saros 145 =

Eclipse cycle of the moon

Saros cycle series 145 for lunar eclipses occurs at the moon's descending node, repeats every 18 years 11 and 1/3 days. It contains 71 events.

This lunar saros is linked to Solar Saros 152.

| Cat. | Saros | Mem | Date | Time UT (hr:mn) | Type | Gamma | Magnitude | Duration (min) | | | Contacts UT (hr:mn) | | | | | | Chart |
| Cat. | Saros | Mem | Date | Greatest | Type | Gamma | Magnitude | Pen. | Par. | Tot. | P1 | P4 | U1 | U2 | U3 | U4 | Chart |
|---|---|---|---|---|---|---|---|---|---|---|---|---|---|---|---|---|---|
| 09253 | 145 | 1 | 1832 Aug 11 | 14:14:52 | Penumbral | -1.5396 | -1.0000 | 79.1 | | | 13:35:19 | 14:54:25 | | | | | |
| 09300 | 145 | 2 | 1850 Aug 22 | 20:54:59 | Penumbral | -1.4679 | -0.8704 | 136.1 | | | 19:46:56 | 22:03:02 | | | | | |
| 09344 | 145 | 3 | 1868 Sep 02 | 3:41:27 | Penumbral | -1.4012 | -0.7499 | 171.9 | | | 2:15:30 | 5:07:24 | | | | | |
| 09387 | 145 | 4 | 1886 Sep 13 | 10:34:41 | Penumbral | -1.3398 | -0.6392 | 198.4 | | | 8:55:29 | 12:13:53 | | | | | |
| 09430 | 145 | 5 | 1904 Sep 24 | 17:34:44 | Penumbral | -1.2837 | -0.5384 | 219.1 | | | 15:45:11 | 19:24:17 | | | | | |
| 09472 | 145 | 6 | 1922 Oct 06 | 0:43:50 | Penumbral | -1.2348 | -0.4508 | 235.2 | | | 22:46:14 | 2:41:26 | | | | | |
| 09514 | 145 | 7 | 1940 Oct 16 | 8:01:17 | Penumbral | -1.1924 | -0.3749 | 248.0 | | | 5:57:17 | 10:05:17 | | | | | |
| 09555 | 145 | 8 | 1958 Oct 27 | 15:27:50 | Penumbral | -1.1570 | -0.3118 | 257.9 | | | 13:18:53 | 17:36:47 | | | | | |
| 09596 | 145 | 9 | 1976 Nov 06 | 23:01:59 | Penumbral | -1.1275 | -0.2594 | 265.8 | | | 20:49:05 | 1:14:53 | | | | | |
| 09637 | 145 | 10 | 1994 Nov 18 | 6:44:54 | Penumbral | -1.1047 | -0.2189 | 271.6 | | | 4:29:06 | 9:00:42 | | | | | |
| 09678 | 145 | 11 | 2012 Nov 28 | 14:34:07 | Penumbral | -1.0869 | -0.1873 | 276.0 | | | 12:16:07 | 16:52:07 | | | | | |
| 09719 | 145 | 12 | 2030 Dec 09 | 22:28:51 | Penumbral | -1.0731 | -0.1628 | 279.2 | | | 20:09:15 | 0:48:27 | | | | | |
| 09759 | 145 | 13 | 2048 Dec 20 | 6:27:48 | Penumbral | -1.0624 | -0.1436 | 281.6 | | | 4:07:00 | 8:48:36 | | | | | |
| 09800 | 145 | 14 | 2066 Dec 31 | 14:30:10 | Penumbral | -1.0539 | -0.1281 | 283.3 | | | 12:08:31 | 16:51:49 | | | | | |
| 09841 | 145 | 15 | 2085 Jan 10 | 22:32:29 | Penumbral | -1.0453 | -0.1119 | 284.9 | | | 20:10:02 | 0:54:56 | | | | | |
| 09883 | 145 | 16 | 2103 Jan 23 | 6:34:00 | Penumbral | -1.0357 | -0.0937 | 286.5 | | | 4:10:45 | 8:57:15 | | | | | |
| 09925 | 145 | 17 | 2121 Feb 02 | 14:32:40 | Penumbral | -1.0235 | -0.0701 | 288.4 | | | 12:08:28 | 16:56:52 | | | | | |
| 09968 | 145 | 18 | 2139 Feb 13 | 22:28:17 | Penumbral | -1.0082 | -0.0406 | 290.8 | | | 20:02:53 | 0:53:41 | | | | | |
| 10013 | 145 | 19 | 2157 Feb 24 | 6:16:36 | Partial | -0.9868 | 0.0005 | 294.2 | 5.6 | | 3:49:30 | 8:43:42 | 6:13:48 | | | 6:19:24 | |
| 10056 | 145 | 20 | 2175 Mar 07 | 13:59:53 | Partial | -0.9608 | 0.0502 | 298.1 | 54.8 | | 11:30:50 | 16:28:56 | 13:32:29 | | | 14:27:17 | |
| 10099 | 145 | 21 | 2193 Mar 17 | 21:34:32 | Partial | -0.9274 | 0.1138 | 303.0 | 81.6 | | 19:03:02 | 0:06:02 | 20:53:44 | | | 22:15:20 | |
| 10142 | 145 | 22 | 2211 Mar 30 | 5:02:58 | Partial | -0.8882 | 0.1880 | 308.4 | 103.6 | | 2:28:46 | 7:37:10 | 4:11:10 | | | 5:54:46 | |
| 10186 | 145 | 23 | 2229 Apr 09 | 12:21:26 | Partial | -0.8403 | 0.2786 | 314.6 | 124.2 | | 9:44:08 | 14:58:44 | 11:19:20 | | | 13:23:32 | |
| 10231 | 145 | 24 | 2247 Apr 20 | 19:34:24 | Partial | -0.7870 | 0.3789 | 320.9 | 142.4 | | 16:53:57 | 22:14:51 | 18:23:12 | | | 20:45:36 | |
| 10277 | 145 | 25 | 2265 May 1 | 2:38:34 | Partial | -0.7260 | 0.4934 | 327.4 | 159.3 | | 23:54:52 | 5:22:16 | 1:18:55 | | | 3:58:13 | |
| 10323 | 145 | 26 | 2283 May 12 | 9:37:20 | Partial | -0.6596 | 0.6177 | 333.7 | 174.4 | | 6:50:29 | 12:24:11 | 8:10:08 | | | 11:04:32 | |
| 10369 | 145 | 27 | 2301 May 23 | 16:29:16 | Partial | -0.5869 | 0.7536 | 339.6 | 187.8 | | 13:39:28 | 19:19:04 | 14:55:22 | | | 18:03:10 | |
| 10415 | 145 | 28 | 2319 Jun 03 | 23:18:19 | Partial | -0.5109 | 0.8953 | 344.8 | 199.2 | | 20:25:55 | 2:10:43 | 21:38:43 | | | 0:57:55 | |
| 10461 | 145 | 29 | 2337 Jun 14 | 6:03:17 | Total | -0.4307 | 1.0448 | 349.2 | 208.8 | 34.0 | 3:08:41 | 8:57:53 | 4:18:53 | 5:46:17 | 6:20:17 | 7:47:41 | |
| 10507 | 145 | 30 | 2355 Jun 25 | 12:46:19 | Total | -0.3479 | 1.1986 | 352.7 | 216.4 | 68.0 | 9:49:58 | 15:42:40 | 10:58:07 | 12:12:19 | 13:20:19 | 14:34:31 | |
| 10553 | 145 | 31 | 2373 Jul 05 | 19:28:57 | Total | -0.2642 | 1.3540 | 355.1 | 222.1 | 85.7 | 16:31:24 | 22:26:30 | 17:37:54 | 18:46:06 | 20:11:48 | 21:20:00 | |
| 10597 | 145 | 32 | 2391 Jul 17 | 2:12:50 | Total | -0.1807 | 1.5086 | 356.4 | 225.9 | 96.3 | 23:14:38 | 5:11:02 | 0:19:53 | 1:24:41 | 3:00:59 | 4:05:47 | |
| 10642 | 145 | 33 | 2409 Jul 27 | 8:59:05 | Total | -0.0983 | 1.6613 | 356.7 | 227.9 | 102.2 | 6:00:44 | 11:57:26 | 7:05:08 | 8:07:59 | 9:50:11 | 10:53:02 | |
| 10686 | 145 | 34 | 2427 Aug 07 | 15:48:57 | Total | -0.0180 | 1.8096 | 356.0 | 228.3 | 104.4 | 12:50:57 | 18:46:57 | 13:54:48 | 14:56:45 | 16:41:09 | 17:43:06 | |
| 10730 | 145 | 35 | 2445 Aug 17 | 22:44:46 | Total | 0.0583 | 1.7366 | 354.5 | 227.3 | 103.3 | 19:47:31 | 1:42:01 | 20:51:07 | 21:53:07 | 23:36:25 | 0:38:25 | |
| 10773 | 145 | 36 | 2463 Aug 29 | 5:47:14 | Total | 0.1296 | 1.6063 | 352.2 | 225.1 | 99.7 | 2:51:08 | 8:43:20 | 3:54:41 | 4:57:23 | 6:37:05 | 7:39:47 | |
| 10815 | 145 | 37 | 2481 Sep 08 | 12:56:08 | Total | 0.1966 | 1.4839 | 349.4 | 221.9 | 93.7 | 10:01:26 | 15:50:50 | 11:05:11 | 12:09:17 | 13:42:59 | 14:47:05 | |
| 10856 | 145 | 38 | 2499 Sep 19 | 20:14:17 | Total | 0.2568 | 1.3737 | 346.3 | 218.1 | 85.8 | 17:21:08 | 23:07:26 | 18:25:14 | 19:31:23 | 20:57:11 | 22:03:20 | |
| 10897 | 145 | 39 | 2517 Oct 01 | 3:41:07 | Total | 0.3108 | 1.2749 | 342.9 | 213.9 | 76.0 | 0:49:40 | 6:32:34 | 1:54:10 | 3:03:07 | 4:19:07 | 5:28:04 | |
| 10937 | 145 | 40 | 2535 Oct 12 | 11:18:38 | Total | 0.3567 | 1.1908 | 339.5 | 209.6 | 65.0 | 8:28:53 | 14:08:23 | 9:33:50 | 10:46:08 | 11:51:08 | 13:03:26 | |
| 10979 | 145 | 41 | 2553 Oct 22 | 19:04:11 | Total | 0.3969 | 1.1172 | 336.2 | 205.3 | 52.0 | 16:16:05 | 21:52:17 | 17:21:32 | 18:38:11 | 19:30:11 | 20:46:50 | |
| 11021 | 145 | 42 | 2571 Nov 03 | 3:01:01 | Total | 0.4285 | 1.0591 | 333.2 | 201.5 | 37.5 | 0:14:25 | 5:47:37 | 1:20:16 | 2:42:16 | 3:19:46 | 4:41:46 | |
| 11061 | 145 | 43 | 2589 Nov 13 | 11:06:01 | Total | 0.4544 | 1.0118 | 330.5 | 198.1 | 16.9 | 8:20:46 | 13:51:16 | 9:26:58 | 10:57:34 | 11:14:28 | 12:45:04 | |
| 11101 | 145 | 44 | 2607 Nov 25 | 19:20:19 | Partial | 0.4734 | 0.9772 | 328.1 | 195.4 | | 16:36:16 | 22:04:22 | 17:42:37 | | | 20:58:01 | |
| 11141 | 145 | 45 | 2625 Dec 06 | 3:40:53 | Partial | 0.4880 | 0.9509 | 326.1 | 193.1 | | 0:57:50 | 6:23:56 | 2:04:20 | | | 5:17:26 | |
| 11182 | 145 | 46 | 2643 Dec 17 | 12:08:59 | Partial | 0.4971 | 0.9347 | 324.3 | 191.5 | | 9:26:50 | 14:51:08 | 10:33:14 | | | 13:44:44 | |
| 11223 | 145 | 47 | 2661 Dec 27 | 20:41:10 | Partial | 0.5035 | 0.9238 | 322.8 | 190.2 | | 17:59:46 | 23:22:34 | 19:06:04 | | | 22:16:16 | |
| 11266 | 145 | 48 | 2680 Jan 08 | 5:16:52 | Partial | 0.5078 | 0.9170 | 321.3 | 189.2 | | 2:36:13 | 7:57:31 | 3:42:16 | | | 6:51:28 | |
| 11308 | 145 | 49 | 2698 Jan 18 | 13:54:16 | Partial | 0.5115 | 0.9116 | 319.9 | 188.4 | | 11:14:19 | 16:34:13 | 12:20:04 | | | 15:28:28 | |
| 11351 | 145 | 50 | 2716 Jan 30 | 22:32:36 | Partial | 0.5151 | 0.9066 | 318.4 | 187.6 | | 19:53:24 | 1:11:48 | 20:58:48 | | | 0:06:24 | |
| 11393 | 145 | 51 | 2734 Feb 10 | 7:08:47 | Partial | 0.5210 | 0.8976 | 316.8 | 186.5 | | 4:30:23 | 9:47:11 | 5:35:32 | | | 8:42:02 | |
| 11436 | 145 | 52 | 2752 Feb 21 | 15:42:15 | Partial | 0.5298 | 0.8835 | 314.9 | 185.0 | | 13:04:48 | 18:19:42 | 14:09:45 | | | 17:14:45 | |
| 11481 | 145 | 53 | 2770 Mar 04 | 0:11:40 | Partial | 0.5427 | 0.8621 | 312.6 | 183.0 | | 21:35:22 | 2:47:58 | 22:40:10 | | | 1:43:10 | |
| 11526 | 145 | 54 | 2788 Mar 14 | 8:36:50 | Partial | 0.5601 | 0.8327 | 309.9 | 180.4 | | 6:01:53 | 11:11:47 | 7:06:38 | | | 10:07:02 | |
| 11572 | 145 | 55 | 2806 Mar 25 | 16:54:41 | Partial | 0.5840 | 0.7913 | 306.6 | 176.7 | | 14:21:23 | 19:27:59 | 15:26:20 | | | 18:23:02 | |
| 11619 | 145 | 56 | 2824 Apr 05 | 1:07:10 | Partial | 0.6129 | 0.7408 | 302.8 | 172.1 | | 22:35:46 | 3:38:34 | 23:41:07 | | | 2:33:13 | |
| 11666 | 145 | 57 | 2842 Apr 16 | 9:12:05 | Partial | 0.6487 | 0.6778 | 298.1 | 166.0 | | 6:43:02 | 11:41:08 | 7:49:05 | | | 10:35:05 | |
| 11712 | 145 | 58 | 2860 Apr 26 | 17:11:09 | Partial | 0.6900 | 0.6047 | 292.8 | 158.3 | | 14:44:45 | 19:37:33 | 15:52:00 | | | 18:30:18 | |
| 11758 | 145 | 59 | 2878 May 8 | 1:02:06 | Partial | 0.7386 | 0.5180 | 286.3 | 148.2 | | 22:38:57 | 3:25:15 | 23:48:00 | | | 2:16:12 | |
| 11804 | 145 | 60 | 2896 May 18 | 8:48:25 | Partial | 0.7915 | 0.4233 | 278.9 | 135.6 | | 6:28:58 | 11:07:52 | 7:40:37 | | | 9:56:13 | |
| 11849 | 145 | 61 | 2914 May 30 | 16:28:18 | Partial | 0.8499 | 0.3183 | 270.2 | 119.2 | | 14:13:12 | 18:43:24 | 15:28:42 | | | 17:27:54 | |
| 11894 | 145 | 62 | 2932 Jun 10 | 0:03:59 | Partial | 0.9122 | 0.2058 | 260.3 | 97.2 | | 21:53:50 | 2:14:08 | 23:15:23 | | | 0:52:35 | |
| 11939 | 145 | 63 | 2950 Jun 21 | 7:35:21 | Partial | 0.9784 | 0.0860 | 248.8 | 63.8 | | 5:30:57 | 9:39:45 | 7:03:27 | | | 8:07:15 | |
| 11985 | 145 | 64 | 2968 Jul 01 | 15:04:44 | Penumbral | 1.0464 | -0.0374 | 235.8 | | | 13:06:50 | 17:02:38 | | | | | |
| 12029 | 145 | 65 | 2986 Jul 12 | 22:32:25 | Penumbral | 1.1162 | -0.1643 | 221.0 | | | 20:41:55 | 0:22:55 | | | | | |

== See also ==
- List of lunar eclipses
  - List of Saros series for lunar eclipses
