= Solar eclipse of October 11, 1931 =

20th-century partial solar eclipse

- Partial eclipse
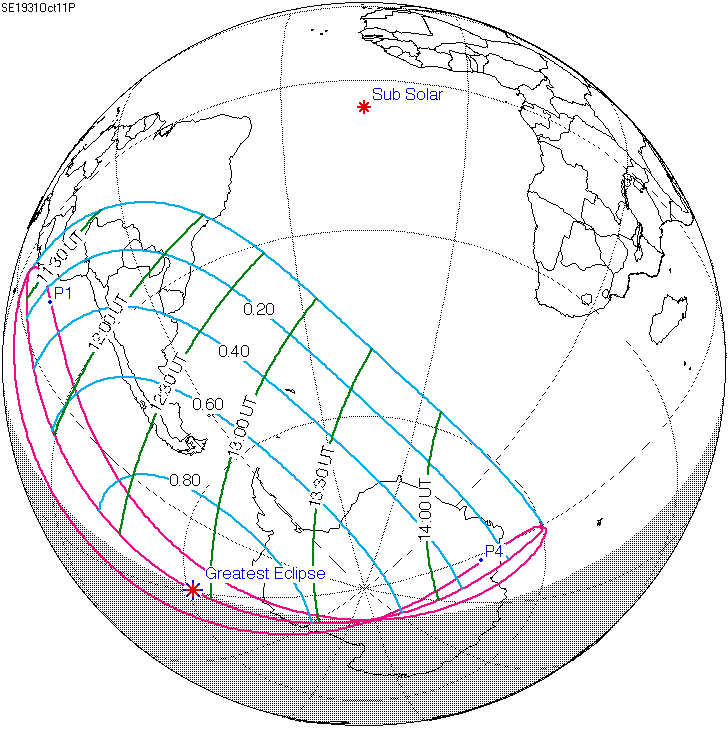
- Map
- Gamma: −1.0607
- Magnitude: 0.9005

Maximum eclipse
- Coordinates: 61.2°S 119.5°W

Times (UTC)
- Greatest eclipse: 12:55:40

References
- Saros: 152 (8 of 70)
- Catalog # (SE5000): 9354

A partial solar eclipse occurred at the Moon's descending node of orbit on Sunday, October 11, 1931, with a magnitude of 0.9005. A solar eclipse occurs when the Moon passes between Earth and the Sun, thereby totally or partly obscuring the image of the Sun for a viewer on Earth. A partial solar eclipse occurs in the polar regions of the Earth when the center of the Moon's shadow misses the Earth.

A partial eclipse was visible for parts of southern and central South America and Antarctica.

== Eclipse details ==
Shown below are two tables displaying details about this particular solar eclipse. The first table outlines times at which the Moon's penumbra or umbra attains the specific parameter, and the second table describes various other parameters pertaining to this eclipse.

October 11, 1931 Solar Eclipse Times
Event	Time (UTC)
First Penumbral External Contact	1931 October 11 at 11:01:29.3 UTC
Greatest Eclipse	1931 October 11 at 12:55:39.8 UTC
Ecliptic Conjunction	1931 October 11 at 13:06:15.3 UTC
Equatorial Conjunction	1931 October 11 at 13:53:48.2 UTC
Last Penumbral External Contact	1931 October 11 at 14:49:27.7 UTC

October 11, 1931 Solar Eclipse Parameters
Parameter	Value
Eclipse Magnitude	0.90054
Eclipse Obscuration	0.88440
Gamma	−1.06069
Sun Right Ascension	13h03m34.8s
Sun Declination	-06°46'31.5"
Sun Semi-Diameter	16'01.4"
Sun Equatorial Horizontal Parallax	08.8"
Moon Right Ascension	13h01m31.6s
Moon Declination	-07°43'48.4"
Moon Semi-Diameter	16'43.0"
Moon Equatorial Horizontal Parallax	1°01'21.2"
ΔT	23.9 s

== Eclipse season ==
This eclipse is part of an eclipse season, a period, roughly every six months, when eclipses occur. Only two (or occasionally three) eclipse seasons occur each year, and each season lasts about 35 days and repeats just short of six months (173 days) later; thus two full eclipse seasons always occur each year. Either two or three eclipses happen each eclipse season. In the sequence below, each eclipse is separated by a fortnight. The first and last eclipse in this sequence is separated by one synodic month.

Eclipse season of September–October 1931
September 12 Descending node (new moon)	September 26 Ascending node (full moon)	October 11 Descending node (new moon)
Partial solar eclipse Solar Saros 114	Total lunar eclipse Lunar Saros 126	Partial solar eclipse Solar Saros 152

== Related eclipses ==
=== Eclipses in 1931 ===
- A total lunar eclipse on April 2.
- A partial solar eclipse on April 18.
- A partial solar eclipse on September 12.
- A total lunar eclipse on September 26.
- A partial solar eclipse on October 11.

=== Metonic ===
- Preceded by: Solar eclipse of December 24, 1927
- Followed by: Solar eclipse of July 30, 1935

=== Tzolkinex ===
- Preceded by: Solar eclipse of August 30, 1924
- Followed by: Solar eclipse of November 21, 1938

=== Half-Saros ===
- Preceded by: Lunar eclipse of October 6, 1922
- Followed by: Lunar eclipse of October 16, 1940

=== Tritos ===
- Preceded by: Solar eclipse of November 10, 1920
- Followed by: Solar eclipse of September 10, 1942

=== Solar Saros 152 ===
- Preceded by: Solar eclipse of September 30, 1913
- Followed by: Solar eclipse of October 21, 1949

=== Inex ===
- Preceded by: Solar eclipse of October 31, 1902
- Followed by: Solar eclipse of September 20, 1960

=== Triad ===
- Preceded by: Solar eclipse of December 9, 1844
- Followed by: Solar eclipse of August 11, 2018

=== Solar eclipses of 1928–1931 ===
This eclipse is a member of a semester series. An eclipse in a semester series of solar eclipses repeats approximately every 177 days and 4 hours (a semester) at alternating nodes of the Moon's orbit.

The partial solar eclipse on June 17, 1928 occurs in the previous lunar year eclipse set, and the partial solar eclipse on September 12, 1931 occurs in the next lunar year eclipse set.

Solar eclipse series sets from 1928 to 1931
Ascending node			Descending node		
Saros	Map	Gamma	Saros	Map	Gamma
117	May 19, 1928 Total (non-central)	1.0048	122	November 12, 1928 Partial	1.0861
127	May 9, 1929 Total	−0.2887	132	November 1, 1929 Annular	0.3514
137	April 28, 1930 Hybrid	0.473	142	October 21, 1930 Total	−0.3804
147	April 18, 1931 Partial	1.2643	152	October 11, 1931 Partial	−1.0607

=== Saros 152 ===
This eclipse is a part of Saros series 152, repeating every 18 years, 11 days, and containing 70 events. The series started with a partial solar eclipse on July 26, 1805. It contains total eclipses from November 2, 1967 through September 14, 2490; hybrid eclipses from September 26, 2508 through October 17, 2544; and annular eclipses from October 29, 2562 through June 16, 2941. The series ends at member 70 as a partial eclipse on August 20, 3049. Its eclipses are tabulated in three columns; every third eclipse in the same column is one exeligmos apart, so they all cast shadows over approximately the same parts of the Earth.

The longest duration of totality will be produced by member 30 at 5 minutes, 16 seconds on June 9, 2328, and the longest duration of annularity will be produced by member 53 at 5 minutes, 20 seconds on February 16, 2743. All eclipses in this series occur at the Moon’s descending node of orbit.

Series members 1–22 occur between 1805 and 2200:
1	2	3
July 26, 1805	August 6, 1823	August 16, 1841
4	5	6
August 28, 1859	September 7, 1877	September 18, 1895
7	8	9
September 30, 1913	October 11, 1931	October 21, 1949
10	11	12
November 2, 1967	November 12, 1985	November 23, 2003
13	14	15
December 4, 2021	December 15, 2039	December 26, 2057
16	17	18
January 6, 2076	January 16, 2094	January 29, 2112
19	20	21
February 8, 2130	February 19, 2148	March 2, 2166
22
March 12, 2184

=== Metonic series ===
The metonic series repeats eclipses every 19 years (6939.69 days), lasting about 5 cycles. Eclipses occur in nearly the same calendar date. In addition, the octon subseries repeats 1/5 of that or every 3.8 years (1387.94 days). All eclipses in this table occur at the Moon's descending node.

22 eclipse events between March 5, 1848 and July 30, 1935
March 5–6	December 22–24	October 9–11	July 29–30	May 17–18
108	110	112	114	116
March 5, 1848			July 29, 1859	May 17, 1863
118	120	122	124	126
March 6, 1867	December 22, 1870	October 10, 1874	July 29, 1878	May 17, 1882
128	130	132	134	136
March 5, 1886	December 22, 1889	October 9, 1893	July 29, 1897	May 18, 1901
138	140	142	144	146
March 6, 1905	December 23, 1908	October 10, 1912	July 30, 1916	May 18, 1920
148	150	152	154	
March 5, 1924	December 24, 1927	October 11, 1931	July 30, 1935	

=== Tritos series ===
This eclipse is a part of a tritos cycle, repeating at alternating nodes every 135 synodic months (≈ 3986.63 days, or 11 years minus 1 month). Their appearance and longitude are irregular due to a lack of synchronization with the anomalistic month (period of perigee), but groupings of 3 tritos cycles (≈ 33 years minus 3 months) come close (≈ 434.044 anomalistic months), so eclipses are similar in these groupings.

Series members between 1801 and 1964
September 17, 1811 (Saros 141)	August 16, 1822 (Saros 142)	July 17, 1833 (Saros 143)	June 16, 1844 (Saros 144)	May 16, 1855 (Saros 145)
April 15, 1866 (Saros 146)	March 15, 1877 (Saros 147)	February 11, 1888 (Saros 148)	January 11, 1899 (Saros 149)	December 12, 1909 (Saros 150)
November 10, 1920 (Saros 151)	October 11, 1931 (Saros 152)	September 10, 1942 (Saros 153)	August 9, 1953 (Saros 154)	July 9, 1964 (Saros 155)

=== Inex series ===
This eclipse is a part of the long period inex cycle, repeating at alternating nodes, every 358 synodic months (≈ 10,571.95 days, or 29 years minus 20 days). Their appearance and longitude are irregular due to a lack of synchronization with the anomalistic month (period of perigee). However, groupings of 3 inex cycles (≈ 87 years minus 2 months) comes close (≈ 1,151.02 anomalistic months), so eclipses are similar in these groupings.

Series members between 1801 and 2200
December 30, 1815 (Saros 148)	December 9, 1844 (Saros 149)	November 20, 1873 (Saros 150)
October 31, 1902 (Saros 151)	October 11, 1931 (Saros 152)	September 20, 1960 (Saros 153)
August 31, 1989 (Saros 154)	August 11, 2018 (Saros 155)	July 22, 2047 (Saros 156)
July 1, 2076 (Saros 157)	June 12, 2105 (Saros 158)	May 23, 2134 (Saros 159)
	April 12, 2192 (Saros 161)	
