= Solar eclipse of October 21, 1949 =

20th-century partial solar eclipse

- Partial eclipse
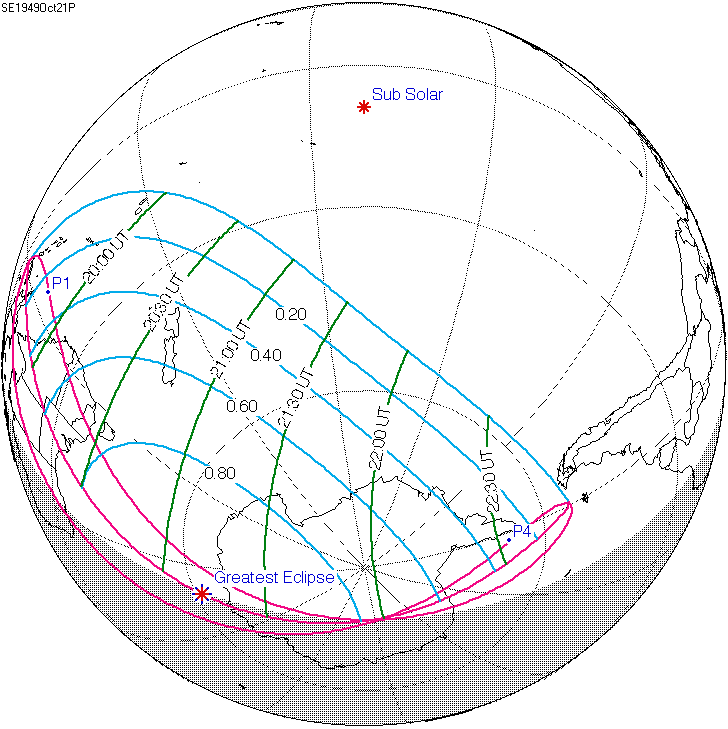
- Map
- Gamma: −1.027
- Magnitude: 0.9638

Maximum eclipse
- Coordinates: 61.5°S 107.5°E

Times (UTC)
- Greatest eclipse: 21:13:01

References
- Saros: 152 (9 of 70)
- Catalog # (SE5000): 9397

A partial solar eclipse occurred at the Moon's descending node of orbit on Friday, October 21, 1949, with a magnitude of 0.9638. A solar eclipse occurs when the Moon passes between Earth and the Sun, thereby totally or partly obscuring the image of the Sun for a viewer on Earth. A partial solar eclipse occurs in the polar regions of the Earth when the center of the Moon's shadow misses the Earth.

A partial eclipse was visible for parts of Australia, Oceania, and Antarctica.

== Eclipse details ==
Shown below are two tables displaying details about this particular solar eclipse. The first table outlines times at which the Moon's penumbra or umbra attains the specific parameter, and the second table describes various other parameters pertaining to this eclipse.

October 21, 1949 Solar Eclipse Times
Event	Time (UTC)
First Penumbral External Contact	1949 October 21 at 19:15:33.6 UTC
Greatest Eclipse	1949 October 21 at 21:13:00.6 UTC
Ecliptic Conjunction	1949 October 21 at 21:23:16.5 UTC
Equatorial Conjunction	1949 October 21 at 22:05:37.5 UTC
Last Penumbral External Contact	1949 October 21 at 23:10:06.9 UTC

October 21, 1949 Solar Eclipse Parameters
Parameter	Value
Eclipse Magnitude	0.96380
Eclipse Obscuration	0.96320
Gamma	−1.02696
Sun Right Ascension	13h44m32.4s
Sun Declination	-10°48'59.9"
Sun Semi-Diameter	16'04.3"
Sun Equatorial Horizontal Parallax	08.8"
Moon Right Ascension	13h42m37.9s
Moon Declination	-11°45'16.5"
Moon Semi-Diameter	16'43.7"
Moon Equatorial Horizontal Parallax	1°01'23.6"
ΔT	29.1 s

== Eclipse season ==
This eclipse is part of an eclipse season, a period, roughly every six months, when eclipses occur. Only two (or occasionally three) eclipse seasons occur each year, and each season lasts about 35 days and repeats just short of six months (173 days) later; thus two full eclipse seasons always occur each year. Either two or three eclipses happen each eclipse season. In the sequence below, each eclipse is separated by a fortnight.

Eclipse season of October 1949
October 7 Ascending node (full moon)	October 21 Descending node (new moon)
Total lunar eclipse Lunar Saros 126	Partial solar eclipse Solar Saros 152

== Related eclipses ==
=== Eclipses in 1949 ===
- A total lunar eclipse on April 13.
- A partial solar eclipse on April 28.
- A total lunar eclipse on October 7.
- A partial solar eclipse on October 21.

=== Metonic ===
- Preceded by: Solar eclipse of January 3, 1946
- Followed by: Solar eclipse of August 9, 1953

=== Tzolkinex ===
- Preceded by: Solar eclipse of September 10, 1942
- Followed by: Solar eclipse of December 2, 1956

=== Half-Saros ===
- Preceded by: Lunar eclipse of October 16, 1940
- Followed by: Lunar eclipse of October 27, 1958

=== Tritos ===
- Preceded by: Solar eclipse of November 21, 1938
- Followed by: Solar eclipse of September 20, 1960

=== Solar Saros 152 ===
- Preceded by: Solar eclipse of October 11, 1931
- Followed by: Solar eclipse of November 2, 1967

=== Inex ===
- Preceded by: Solar eclipse of November 10, 1920
- Followed by: Solar eclipse of October 2, 1978

=== Triad ===
- Preceded by: Solar eclipse of December 21, 1862
- Followed by: Solar eclipse of August 21, 2036

=== Solar eclipses of 1946–1949 ===
This eclipse is a member of a semester series. An eclipse in a semester series of solar eclipses repeats approximately every 177 days and 4 hours (a semester) at alternating nodes of the Moon's orbit.

The partial solar eclipses on January 3, 1946 and June 29, 1946 occur in the previous lunar year eclipse set.

Solar eclipse series sets from 1946 to 1949
Ascending node			Descending node		
Saros	Map	Gamma	Saros	Map	Gamma
117	May 30, 1946 Partial	−1.0711	122	November 23, 1946 Partial	1.105
127	May 20, 1947 Total	−0.3528	132	November 12, 1947 Annular	0.3743
137	May 9, 1948 Annular	0.4133	142	November 1, 1948 Total	−0.3517
147	April 28, 1949 Partial	1.2068	152	October 21, 1949 Partial	−1.027

=== Saros 152 ===
This eclipse is a part of Saros series 152, repeating every 18 years, 11 days, and containing 70 events. The series started with a partial solar eclipse on July 26, 1805. It contains total eclipses from November 2, 1967 through September 14, 2490; hybrid eclipses from September 26, 2508 through October 17, 2544; and annular eclipses from October 29, 2562 through June 16, 2941. The series ends at member 70 as a partial eclipse on August 20, 3049. Its eclipses are tabulated in three columns; every third eclipse in the same column is one exeligmos apart, so they all cast shadows over approximately the same parts of the Earth.

The longest duration of totality will be produced by member 30 at 5 minutes, 16 seconds on June 9, 2328, and the longest duration of annularity will be produced by member 53 at 5 minutes, 20 seconds on February 16, 2743. All eclipses in this series occur at the Moon’s descending node of orbit.

Series members 1–22 occur between 1805 and 2200:
1	2	3
July 26, 1805	August 6, 1823	August 16, 1841
4	5	6
August 28, 1859	September 7, 1877	September 18, 1895
7	8	9
September 30, 1913	October 11, 1931	October 21, 1949
10	11	12
November 2, 1967	November 12, 1985	November 23, 2003
13	14	15
December 4, 2021	December 15, 2039	December 26, 2057
16	17	18
January 6, 2076	January 16, 2094	January 29, 2112
19	20	21
February 8, 2130	February 19, 2148	March 2, 2166
22
March 12, 2184

=== Metonic series ===
The metonic series repeats eclipses every 19 years (6939.69 days), lasting about 5 cycles. Eclipses occur in nearly the same calendar date. In addition, the octon subseries repeats 1/5 of that or every 3.8 years (1387.94 days). All eclipses in this table occur at the Moon's descending node.

22 eclipse events between March 16, 1866 and August 9, 1953
March 16–17	January 1–3	October 20–22	August 9–10	May 27–29
108	110	112	114	116
March 16, 1866			August 9, 1877	May 27, 1881
118	120	122	124	126
March 16, 1885	January 1, 1889	October 20, 1892	August 9, 1896	May 28, 1900
128	130	132	134	136
March 17, 1904	January 3, 1908	October 22, 1911	August 10, 1915	May 29, 1919
138	140	142	144	146
March 17, 1923	January 3, 1927	October 21, 1930	August 10, 1934	May 29, 1938
148	150	152	154	
March 16, 1942	January 3, 1946	October 21, 1949	August 9, 1953	

=== Tritos series ===
This eclipse is a part of a tritos cycle, repeating at alternating nodes every 135 synodic months (≈ 3986.63 days, or 11 years minus 1 month). Their appearance and longitude are irregular due to a lack of synchronization with the anomalistic month (period of perigee), but groupings of 3 tritos cycles (≈ 33 years minus 3 months) come close (≈ 434.044 anomalistic months), so eclipses are similar in these groupings.

Series members between 1801 and 1982
November 29, 1807 (Saros 139)	October 29, 1818 (Saros 140)	September 28, 1829 (Saros 141)	August 27, 1840 (Saros 142)	July 28, 1851 (Saros 143)
June 27, 1862 (Saros 144)	May 26, 1873 (Saros 145)	April 25, 1884 (Saros 146)	March 26, 1895 (Saros 147)	February 23, 1906 (Saros 148)
January 23, 1917 (Saros 149)	December 24, 1927 (Saros 150)	November 21, 1938 (Saros 151)	October 21, 1949 (Saros 152)	September 20, 1960 (Saros 153)
August 20, 1971 (Saros 154)	July 20, 1982 (Saros 155)			

=== Inex series ===
This eclipse is a part of the long period inex cycle, repeating at alternating nodes, every 358 synodic months (≈ 10,571.95 days, or 29 years minus 20 days). Their appearance and longitude are irregular due to a lack of synchronization with the anomalistic month (period of perigee). However, groupings of 3 inex cycles (≈ 87 years minus 2 months) comes close (≈ 1,151.02 anomalistic months), so eclipses are similar in these groupings.

Series members between 1801 and 2200
January 30, 1805 (Saros 147)	January 9, 1834 (Saros 148)	December 21, 1862 (Saros 149)
December 1, 1891 (Saros 150)	November 10, 1920 (Saros 151)	October 21, 1949 (Saros 152)
October 2, 1978 (Saros 153)	September 11, 2007 (Saros 154)	August 21, 2036 (Saros 155)
August 2, 2065 (Saros 156)	July 12, 2094 (Saros 157)	June 23, 2123 (Saros 158)
June 3, 2152 (Saros 159)	May 13, 2181 (Saros 160)	
