= Solar eclipse of January 16, 2094 =

Total eclipse

- Total eclipse
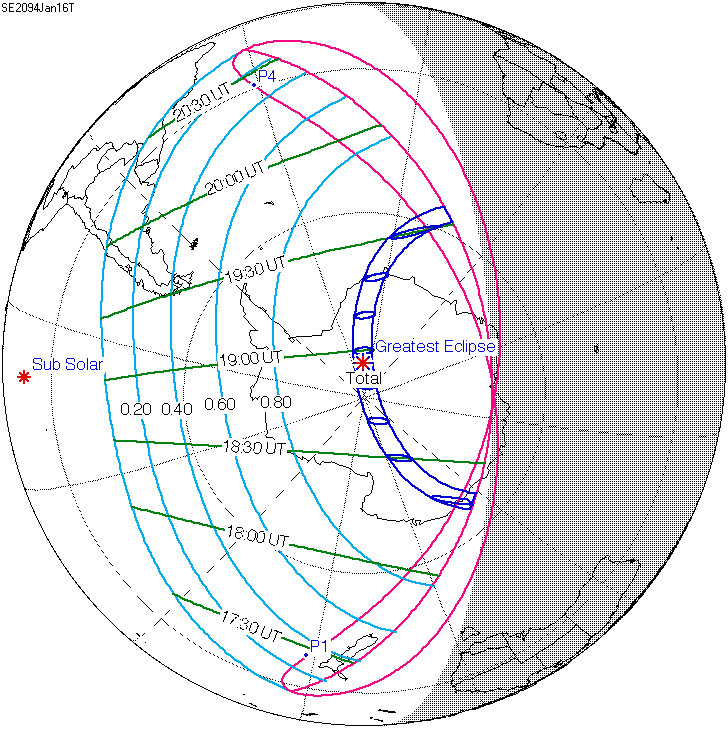
- Map
- Gamma: −0.9333
- Magnitude: 1.0342

Maximum eclipse
- Duration: 111 s (1 min 51 s)
- Coordinates: 84.8°S 10.6°W
- Max. width of band: 329 km (204 mi)

Times (UTC)
- Greatest eclipse: 18:59:03

References
- Saros: 152 (17 of 70)
- Catalog # (SE5000): 9718

A total solar eclipse will occur at the Moon's descending node of orbit on Saturday, January 16, 2094, with a magnitude of 1.0342. A solar eclipse occurs when the Moon passes between Earth and the Sun, thereby totally or partly obscuring the image of the Sun for a viewer on Earth. A total solar eclipse occurs when the Moon's apparent diameter is larger than the Sun's, blocking all direct sunlight, turning day into darkness. Totality occurs in a narrow path across Earth's surface, with the partial solar eclipse visible over a surrounding region thousands of kilometres wide. Occurring about 10.5 hours before perigee (on January 17, 2094, at 05:40 UTC), the Moon's apparent diameter will be larger.

This will be the first of four solar eclipses in 2094, with the others occurring on June 13, July 12, and December 7.

The path of totality will be visible from parts of Antarctica. A partial solar eclipse will also be visible for parts of New Zealand, Antarctica, and southern South America. This total eclipse is notable in that the path of totality passes over the South Pole.

== Eclipse details ==
Shown below are two tables displaying details about this particular solar eclipse. The first table outlines times at which the Moon's penumbra or umbra attains the specific parameter, and the second table describes various other parameters pertaining to this eclipse.

January 16, 2094 Solar Eclipse Times
Event	Time (UTC)
First Penumbral External Contact	2094 January 16 at 16:53:04.7 UTC
First Umbral External Contact	2094 January 16 at 18:20:43.2 UTC
First Central Line	2094 January 16 at 18:22:49.9 UTC
First Umbral Internal Contact	2094 January 16 at 18:25:03.5 UTC
Equatorial Conjunction	2094 January 16 at 18:49:35.7 UTC
Greatest Eclipse	2094 January 16 at 18:59:03.4 UTC
Greatest Duration	2094 January 16 at 18:59:14.4 UTC
Ecliptic Conjunction	2094 January 16 at 19:08:26.0 UTC
Last Umbral Internal Contact	2094 January 16 at 19:33:09.4 UTC
Last Central Line	2094 January 16 at 19:35:23.5 UTC
Last Umbral External Contact	2094 January 16 at 19:37:30.8 UTC
Last Penumbral External Contact	2094 January 16 at 21:05:05.3 UTC

January 16, 2094 Solar Eclipse Parameters
Parameter	Value
Eclipse Magnitude	1.03423
Eclipse Obscuration	1.06962
Gamma	−0.93334
Sun Right Ascension	19h56m48.4s
Sun Declination	-20°43'02.8"
Sun Semi-Diameter	16'15.5"
Sun Equatorial Horizontal Parallax	08.9"
Moon Right Ascension	19h57m12.4s
Moon Declination	-21°39'54.3"
Moon Semi-Diameter	16'43.2"
Moon Equatorial Horizontal Parallax	1°01'21.9"
ΔT	117.8 s

== Eclipse season ==
This eclipse is part of an eclipse season, a period, roughly every six months, when eclipses occur. Only two (or occasionally three) eclipse seasons occur each year, and each season lasts about 35 days and repeats just short of six months (173 days) later; thus two full eclipse seasons always occur each year. Either two or three eclipses happen each eclipse season. In the sequence below, each eclipse is separated by a fortnight.

Eclipse season of January 2094
January 1 Ascending node (full moon)	January 16 Descending node (new moon)
Partial lunar eclipse Lunar Saros 126	Total solar eclipse Solar Saros 152

== Related eclipses ==
=== Eclipses in 2094 ===
- A partial lunar eclipse on January 1.
- A total solar eclipse on January 16.
- A partial solar eclipse on June 13.
- A total lunar eclipse on June 28.
- A partial solar eclipse on July 12.
- A partial solar eclipse on December 7.
- A total lunar eclipse on December 21.

=== Metonic ===
- Preceded by: Solar eclipse of March 31, 2090
- Followed by: Solar eclipse of November 4, 2097

=== Tzolkinex ===
- Preceded by: Solar eclipse of December 6, 2086
- Followed by: Solar eclipse of February 28, 2101

=== Half-Saros ===
- Preceded by: Lunar eclipse of January 10, 2085
- Followed by: Lunar eclipse of January 23, 2103

=== Tritos ===
- Preceded by: Solar eclipse of February 16, 2083
- Followed by: Solar eclipse of December 17, 2104

=== Solar Saros 152 ===
- Preceded by: Solar eclipse of January 6, 2076
- Followed by: Solar eclipse of January 29, 2112

=== Inex ===
- Preceded by: Solar eclipse of February 5, 2065
- Followed by: Solar eclipse of December 28, 2122

=== Triad ===
- Preceded by: Solar eclipse of March 19, 2007
- Followed by: Solar eclipse of November 17, 2180

=== Solar eclipses of 2091–2094 ===
This eclipse is a member of a semester series. An eclipse in a semester series of solar eclipses repeats approximately every 177 days and 4 hours (a semester) at alternating nodes of the Moon's orbit.

The partial solar eclipses on June 13, 2094 and December 7, 2094 occur in the next lunar year eclipse set.

Solar eclipse series sets from 2091 to 2094
Descending node			Ascending node		
Saros	Map	Gamma	Saros	Map	Gamma
122	February 18, 2091 Partial	1.1779	127	August 15, 2091 Total	−0.949
132	February 7, 2092 Annular	0.4322	137	August 3, 2092 Annular	−0.2044
142	January 27, 2093 Total	−0.2737	147	July 23, 2093 Annular	0.5717
152	January 16, 2094 Total	−0.9333	157	July 12, 2094 Partial	1.3150

=== Saros 152 ===
This eclipse is a part of Saros series 152, repeating every 18 years, 11 days, and containing 70 events. The series started with a partial solar eclipse on July 26, 1805. It contains total eclipses from November 2, 1967 through September 14, 2490; hybrid eclipses from September 26, 2508 through October 17, 2544; and annular eclipses from October 29, 2562 through June 16, 2941. The series ends at member 70 as a partial eclipse on August 20, 3049. Its eclipses are tabulated in three columns; every third eclipse in the same column is one exeligmos apart, so they all cast shadows over approximately the same parts of the Earth.

The longest duration of totality will be produced by member 30 at 5 minutes, 16 seconds on June 9, 2328, and the longest duration of annularity will be produced by member 53 at 5 minutes, 20 seconds on February 16, 2743. All eclipses in this series occur at the Moon’s descending node of orbit.

Series members 1–22 occur between 1805 and 2200:
1	2	3
July 26, 1805	August 6, 1823	August 16, 1841
4	5	6
August 28, 1859	September 7, 1877	September 18, 1895
7	8	9
September 30, 1913	October 11, 1931	October 21, 1949
10	11	12
November 2, 1967	November 12, 1985	November 23, 2003
13	14	15
December 4, 2021	December 15, 2039	December 26, 2057
16	17	18
January 6, 2076	January 16, 2094	January 29, 2112
19	20	21
February 8, 2130	February 19, 2148	March 2, 2166
22
March 12, 2184

=== Metonic series ===
The metonic series repeats eclipses every 19 years (6939.69 days), lasting about 5 cycles. Eclipses occur in nearly the same calendar date. In addition, the octon subseries repeats 1/5 of that or every 3.8 years (1387.94 days). All eclipses in this table occur at the Moon's descending node.

22 eclipse events between June 12, 2029 and November 4, 2116
June 11–12	March 30–31	January 16	November 4–5	August 23–24
118	120	122	124	126
June 12, 2029	March 30, 2033	January 16, 2037	November 4, 2040	August 23, 2044
128	130	132	134	136
June 11, 2048	March 30, 2052	January 16, 2056	November 5, 2059	August 24, 2063
138	140	142	144	146
June 11, 2067	March 31, 2071	January 16, 2075	November 4, 2078	August 24, 2082
148	150	152	154	156
June 11, 2086	March 31, 2090	January 16, 2094	November 4, 2097	August 24, 2101
158	160	162	164	
June 12, 2105			November 4, 2116	

=== Tritos series ===
This eclipse is a part of a tritos cycle, repeating at alternating nodes every 135 synodic months (≈ 3986.63 days, or 11 years minus 1 month). Their appearance and longitude are irregular due to a lack of synchronization with the anomalistic month (period of perigee), but groupings of 3 tritos cycles (≈ 33 years minus 3 months) come close (≈ 434.044 anomalistic months), so eclipses are similar in these groupings.

Series members between 1801 and 2200
April 4, 1810 (Saros 126)	March 4, 1821 (Saros 127)	February 1, 1832 (Saros 128)	December 31, 1842 (Saros 129)	November 30, 1853 (Saros 130)
October 30, 1864 (Saros 131)	September 29, 1875 (Saros 132)	August 29, 1886 (Saros 133)	July 29, 1897 (Saros 134)	June 28, 1908 (Saros 135)
May 29, 1919 (Saros 136)	April 28, 1930 (Saros 137)	March 27, 1941 (Saros 138)	February 25, 1952 (Saros 139)	January 25, 1963 (Saros 140)
December 24, 1973 (Saros 141)	November 22, 1984 (Saros 142)	October 24, 1995 (Saros 143)	September 22, 2006 (Saros 144)	August 21, 2017 (Saros 145)
July 22, 2028 (Saros 146)	June 21, 2039 (Saros 147)	May 20, 2050 (Saros 148)	April 20, 2061 (Saros 149)	March 19, 2072 (Saros 150)
February 16, 2083 (Saros 151)	January 16, 2094 (Saros 152)	December 17, 2104 (Saros 153)	November 16, 2115 (Saros 154)	October 16, 2126 (Saros 155)
September 15, 2137 (Saros 156)	August 14, 2148 (Saros 157)	July 15, 2159 (Saros 158)	June 14, 2170 (Saros 159)	May 13, 2181 (Saros 160)
April 12, 2192 (Saros 161)

=== Inex series ===
This eclipse is a part of the long period inex cycle, repeating at alternating nodes, every 358 synodic months (≈ 10,571.95 days, or 29 years minus 20 days). Their appearance and longitude are irregular due to a lack of synchronization with the anomalistic month (period of perigee). However, groupings of 3 inex cycles (≈ 87 years minus 2 months) comes close (≈ 1,151.02 anomalistic months), so eclipses are similar in these groupings.

Series members between 1801 and 2200
August 5, 1804 (Saros 142)	July 17, 1833 (Saros 143)	June 27, 1862 (Saros 144)
June 6, 1891 (Saros 145)	May 18, 1920 (Saros 146)	April 28, 1949 (Saros 147)
April 7, 1978 (Saros 148)	March 19, 2007 (Saros 149)	February 27, 2036 (Saros 150)
February 5, 2065 (Saros 151)	January 16, 2094 (Saros 152)	December 28, 2122 (Saros 153)
December 8, 2151 (Saros 154)	November 17, 2180 (Saros 155)	
