= Solar eclipse of November 2, 1967 =

Total eclipse

- Total eclipse
- Map
- Gamma: 1.0007
- Magnitude: 1.0126

Maximum eclipse
- Duration: -
- Coordinates: 62°S 27.8°W
- Max. width of band: km

Times (UTC)
- Greatest eclipse: 5:38:56

References
- Saros: 152 (10 of 70)
- Catalog # (SE5000): 9437

A total solar eclipse occurred at the Moon's descending node of orbit on Thursday, November 2, 1967, with a magnitude of 1.0126. A solar eclipse occurs when the Moon passes between Earth and the Sun, thereby totally or partly obscuring the image of the Sun for a viewer on Earth. A total solar eclipse occurs when the Moon's apparent diameter is larger than the Sun's, blocking all direct sunlight, turning day into darkness. Totality occurs in a narrow path across Earth's surface, with the partial solar eclipse visible over a surrounding region thousands of kilometres wide. Occurring about 4 hours after perigee (on November 2, 1967, at 1:50 UTC), the Moon's apparent diameter was larger.

It was unusual in that while it is a total solar eclipse, it was not a central solar eclipse. A non-central eclipse is one where the center-line of totality does not intersect the surface of the Earth (when the gamma is between 0.9972 and 1.0260). Instead, the center line passes just above the Earth's surface. This rare type occurs when totality is only visible at sunset or sunrise in a polar region.

While totality was not visible for any land masses, a partial eclipse was visible for Southern Africa and Antarctica. This was the first of 55 umbral solar eclipses of Solar Saros 152.

== Eclipse details ==
Shown below are two tables displaying details about this particular solar eclipse. The first table outlines times at which the Moon's penumbra or umbra attains the specific parameter, and the second table describes various other parameters pertaining to this eclipse.

November 2, 1967 Solar Eclipse Times
Event	Time (UTC)
First Penumbral External Contact	1967 November 2 at 03:39:02.7 UTC
First Umbral External Contact	1967 November 2 at 05:26:47.4 UTC
Greatest Eclipse	1967 November 2 at 05:38:56.2 UTC
Ecliptic Conjunction	1967 November 2 at 05:48:56.9 UTC
Last Umbral External Contact	1967 November 2 at 05:50:36.0 UTC
Equatorial Conjunction	1967 November 2 at 06:25:04.9 UTC
Last Penumbral External Contact	1967 November 2 at 07:38:31.3 UTC

November 2, 1967 Solar Eclipse Parameters
Parameter	Value
Eclipse Magnitude	1.01261
Eclipse Obscuration	-
Gamma	−1.00067
Sun Right Ascension	14h26m52.0s
Sun Declination	-14°32'08.6"
Sun Semi-Diameter	16'07.1"
Sun Equatorial Horizontal Parallax	08.9"
Moon Right Ascension	14h25m07.9s
Moon Declination	-15°28'04.1"
Moon Semi-Diameter	16'44.2"
Moon Equatorial Horizontal Parallax	1°01'25.4"
ΔT	38.1 s

== Eclipse season ==
This eclipse is part of an eclipse season, a period, roughly every six months, when eclipses occur. Only two (or occasionally three) eclipse seasons occur each year, and each season lasts about 35 days and repeats just short of six months (173 days) later; thus two full eclipse seasons always occur each year. Either two or three eclipses happen each eclipse season. In the sequence below, each eclipse is separated by a fortnight.

Eclipse season of October–November 1967
October 18 Ascending node (full moon)	November 2 Descending node (new moon)
Total lunar eclipse Lunar Saros 126	Total solar eclipse Solar Saros 152

== Related eclipses ==
=== Eclipses in 1967 ===
- A total lunar eclipse on April 24.
- A partial solar eclipse on May 9.
- A total lunar eclipse on October 18.
- A non-central total solar eclipse on November 2.

=== Metonic ===
- Preceded by: Solar eclipse of January 14, 1964
- Followed by: Solar eclipse of August 20, 1971

=== Tzolkinex ===
- Preceded by: Solar eclipse of September 20, 1960
- Followed by: Solar eclipse of December 13, 1974

=== Half-Saros ===
- Preceded by: Lunar eclipse of October 27, 1958
- Followed by: Lunar eclipse of November 6, 1976

=== Tritos ===
- Preceded by: Solar eclipse of December 2, 1956
- Followed by: Solar eclipse of October 2, 1978

=== Solar Saros 152 ===
- Preceded by: Solar eclipse of October 21, 1949
- Followed by: Solar eclipse of November 12, 1985

=== Inex ===
- Preceded by: Solar eclipse of November 21, 1938
- Followed by: Solar eclipse of October 12, 1996

=== Triad ===
- Preceded by: Solar eclipse of December 31, 1880
- Followed by: Solar eclipse of September 2, 2054

=== Solar eclipses of 1964–1967 ===
This eclipse is a member of a semester series. An eclipse in a semester series of solar eclipses repeats approximately every 177 days and 4 hours (a semester) at alternating nodes of the Moon's orbit.

The partial solar eclipses on January 14, 1964 and July 9, 1964 occur in the previous lunar year eclipse set.

Solar eclipse series sets from 1964 to 1967
Ascending node			Descending node		
Saros	Map	Gamma	Saros	Map	Gamma
117	June 10, 1964 Partial	−1.1393	122	December 4, 1964 Partial	1.1193
127	May 30, 1965 Total	−0.4225	132	November 23, 1965 Annular	0.3906
137	May 20, 1966 Annular	0.3467	142	November 12, 1966 Total	−0.33
147	May 9, 1967 Partial	1.1422	152	November 2, 1967 Total (non-central)	1.0007

=== Saros 152 ===
This eclipse is a part of Saros series 152, repeating every 18 years, 11 days, and containing 70 events. The series started with a partial solar eclipse on July 26, 1805. It contains total eclipses from November 2, 1967 through September 14, 2490; hybrid eclipses from September 26, 2508 through October 17, 2544; and annular eclipses from October 29, 2562 through June 16, 2941. The series ends at member 70 as a partial eclipse on August 20, 3049. Its eclipses are tabulated in three columns; every third eclipse in the same column is one exeligmos apart, so they all cast shadows over approximately the same parts of the Earth.

The longest duration of totality will be produced by member 30 at 5 minutes, 16 seconds on June 9, 2328, and the longest duration of annularity will be produced by member 53 at 5 minutes, 20 seconds on February 16, 2743. All eclipses in this series occur at the Moon’s descending node of orbit.

Series members 1–22 occur between 1805 and 2200:
1	2	3
July 26, 1805	August 6, 1823	August 16, 1841
4	5	6
August 28, 1859	September 7, 1877	September 18, 1895
7	8	9
September 30, 1913	October 11, 1931	October 21, 1949
10	11	12
November 2, 1967	November 12, 1985	November 23, 2003
13	14	15
December 4, 2021	December 15, 2039	December 26, 2057
16	17	18
January 6, 2076	January 16, 2094	January 29, 2112
19	20	21
February 8, 2130	February 19, 2148	March 2, 2166
22
March 12, 2184

=== Metonic series ===
The metonic series repeats eclipses every 19 years (6939.69 days), lasting about 5 cycles. Eclipses occur in nearly the same calendar date. In addition, the octon subseries repeats 1/5 of that or every 3.8 years (1387.94 days). All eclipses in this table occur at the Moon's descending node.

22 eclipse events between March 27, 1884 and August 20, 1971
March 27–29	January 14	November 1–2	August 20–21	June 8
108	110	112	114	116
March 27, 1884			August 20, 1895	June 8, 1899
118	120	122	124	126
March 29, 1903	January 14, 1907	November 2, 1910	August 21, 1914	June 8, 1918
128	130	132	134	136
March 28, 1922	January 14, 1926	November 1, 1929	August 21, 1933	June 8, 1937
138	140	142	144	146
March 27, 1941	January 14, 1945	November 1, 1948	August 20, 1952	June 8, 1956
148	150	152	154	
March 27, 1960	January 14, 1964	November 2, 1967	August 20, 1971	

=== Tritos series ===
This eclipse is a part of a tritos cycle, repeating at alternating nodes every 135 synodic months (≈ 3986.63 days, or 11 years minus 1 month). Their appearance and longitude are irregular due to a lack of synchronization with the anomalistic month (period of perigee), but groupings of 3 tritos cycles (≈ 33 years minus 3 months) come close (≈ 434.044 anomalistic months), so eclipses are similar in these groupings.

The partial solar eclipse on October 24, 2098 (part of Saros 164) is also a part of this series but is not included in the table below.

Series members between 1801 and 2011
February 11, 1804 (Saros 137)	January 10, 1815 (Saros 138)	December 9, 1825 (Saros 139)	November 9, 1836 (Saros 140)	October 9, 1847 (Saros 141)
September 7, 1858 (Saros 142)	August 7, 1869 (Saros 143)	July 7, 1880 (Saros 144)	June 6, 1891 (Saros 145)	May 7, 1902 (Saros 146)
April 6, 1913 (Saros 147)	March 5, 1924 (Saros 148)	February 3, 1935 (Saros 149)	January 3, 1946 (Saros 150)	December 2, 1956 (Saros 151)
November 2, 1967 (Saros 152)	October 2, 1978 (Saros 153)	August 31, 1989 (Saros 154)	July 31, 2000 (Saros 155)	July 1, 2011 (Saros 156)

=== Inex series ===
This eclipse is a part of the long period inex cycle, repeating at alternating nodes, every 358 synodic months (≈ 10,571.95 days, or 29 years minus 20 days). Their appearance and longitude are irregular due to a lack of synchronization with the anomalistic month (period of perigee). However, groupings of 3 inex cycles (≈ 87 years minus 2 months) comes close (≈ 1,151.02 anomalistic months), so eclipses are similar in these groupings.

Series members between 1801 and 2200
February 11, 1823 (Saros 147)	January 21, 1852 (Saros 148)	December 31, 1880 (Saros 149)
December 12, 1909 (Saros 150)	November 21, 1938 (Saros 151)	November 2, 1967 (Saros 152)
October 12, 1996 (Saros 153)	September 21, 2025 (Saros 154)	September 2, 2054 (Saros 155)
August 13, 2083 (Saros 156)	July 23, 2112 (Saros 157)	July 3, 2141 (Saros 158)
June 14, 2170 (Saros 159)	May 24, 2199 (Saros 160)	
