= Solar eclipse of April 7, 1978 =

20th-century partial solar eclipse

- Partial eclipse
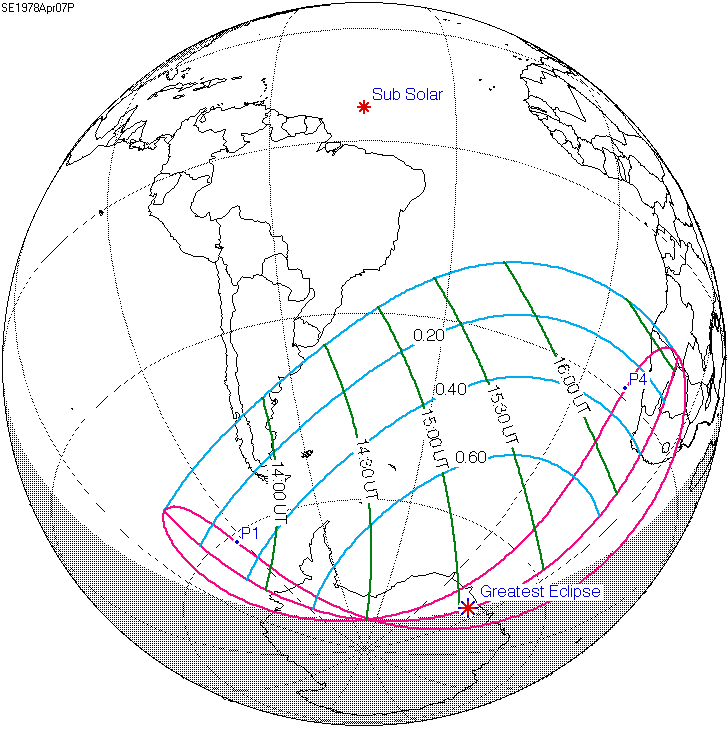
- Map
- Gamma: −1.1081
- Magnitude: 0.7883

Maximum eclipse
- Coordinates: 71.9°S 23.3°E

Times (UTC)
- Greatest eclipse: 15:03:47

References
- Saros: 148 (19 of 75)
- Catalog # (SE5000): 9460

A partial solar eclipse occurred at the Moon's descending node of orbit on Friday, April 7, 1978, with a magnitude of 0.7883. A solar eclipse occurs when the Moon passes between Earth and the Sun, thereby totally or partly obscuring the image of the Sun for a viewer on Earth. A partial solar eclipse occurs in the polar regions of the Earth when the center of the Moon's shadow misses the Earth.

A partial eclipse was visible for parts of Antarctica, southern South America, and Southern Africa.

== Eclipse details ==
Shown below are two tables displaying details about this particular solar eclipse. The first table outlines times at which the Moon's penumbra or umbra attains the specific parameter, and the second table describes various other parameters pertaining to this eclipse.

April 7, 1978 Solar Eclipse Times
Event	Time (UTC)
First Penumbral External Contact	1978 April 7 at 13:02:42.8 UTC
Equatorial Conjunction	1978 April 7 at 14:26:21.8 UTC
Greatest Eclipse	1978 April 7 at 15:03:46.6 UTC
Ecliptic Conjunction	1978 April 7 at 15:15:57.9 UTC
Last Penumbral External Contact	1978 April 7 at 17:05:13.3 UTC

April 7, 1978 Solar Eclipse Parameters
Parameter	Value
Eclipse Magnitude	0.78828
Eclipse Obscuration	0.72528
Gamma	−1.10812
Sun Right Ascension	01h04m17.8s
Sun Declination	+06°50'43.3"
Sun Semi-Diameter	15'58.5"
Sun Equatorial Horizontal Parallax	08.8"
Moon Right Ascension	01h05m31.3s
Moon Declination	+05°50'22.8"
Moon Semi-Diameter	15'32.4"
Moon Equatorial Horizontal Parallax	0°57'02.1"
ΔT	48.8 s

== Eclipse season ==
This eclipse is part of an eclipse season, a period, roughly every six months, when eclipses occur. Only two (or occasionally three) eclipse seasons occur each year, and each season lasts about 35 days and repeats just short of six months (173 days) later; thus two full eclipse seasons always occur each year. Either two or three eclipses happen each eclipse season. In the sequence below, each eclipse is separated by a fortnight.

Eclipse season of March–April 1978
March 24 Ascending node (full moon)	April 7 Descending node (new moon)
Total lunar eclipse Lunar Saros 122	Partial solar eclipse Solar Saros 148

== Related eclipses ==
=== Eclipses in 1978 ===
- A total lunar eclipse on March 24.
- A partial solar eclipse on April 7.
- A total lunar eclipse on September 16.
- A partial solar eclipse on October 2.

=== Metonic ===
- Preceded by: Solar eclipse of June 20, 1974
- Followed by: Solar eclipse of January 25, 1982

=== Tzolkinex ===
- Preceded by: Solar eclipse of February 25, 1971
- Followed by: Solar eclipse of May 19, 1985

=== Half-Saros ===
- Preceded by: Lunar eclipse of April 2, 1969
- Followed by: Lunar eclipse of April 14, 1987

=== Tritos ===
- Preceded by: Solar eclipse of May 9, 1967
- Followed by: Solar eclipse of March 7, 1989

=== Solar Saros 148 ===
- Preceded by: Solar eclipse of March 27, 1960
- Followed by: Solar eclipse of April 17, 1996

=== Inex ===
- Preceded by: Solar eclipse of April 28, 1949
- Followed by: Solar eclipse of March 19, 2007

=== Triad ===
- Preceded by: Solar eclipse of June 6, 1891
- Followed by: Solar eclipse of February 5, 2065

=== Solar eclipses of 1975–1978 ===
This eclipse is a member of a semester series. An eclipse in a semester series of solar eclipses repeats approximately every 177 days and 4 hours (a semester) at alternating nodes of the Moon's orbit.

Solar eclipse series sets from 1975 to 1978
Descending node			Ascending node		
Saros	Map	Gamma	Saros	Map	Gamma
118	May 11, 1975 Partial	1.0647	123	November 3, 1975 Partial	−1.0248
128	April 29, 1976 Annular	0.3378	133	October 23, 1976 Total	−0.327
138	April 18, 1977 Annular	−0.399	143	October 12, 1977 Total	0.3836
148	April 7, 1978 Partial	−1.1081	153	October 2, 1978 Partial	1.1616

=== Saros 148 ===
This eclipse is a part of Saros series 148, repeating every 18 years, 11 days, and containing 75 events. The series started with a partial solar eclipse on September 21, 1653. It contains annular eclipses on April 29, 2014 and May 9, 2032; a hybrid eclipse on May 20, 2050; and total eclipses from May 31, 2068 through August 3, 2771. The series ends at member 75 as a partial eclipse on December 12, 2987. Its eclipses are tabulated in three columns; every third eclipse in the same column is one exeligmos apart, so they all cast shadows over approximately the same parts of the Earth.

The longest duration of annularity will be produced by member 22 at 22 seconds (by default) on May 9, 2032, and the longest duration of totality will be produced by member 54 at 5 minutes, 23 seconds on April 26, 2609. All eclipses in this series occur at the Moon’s descending node of orbit.

Series members 10–31 occur between 1801 and 2200:
10	11	12
December 30, 1815	January 9, 1834	January 21, 1852
13	14	15
January 31, 1870	February 11, 1888	February 23, 1906
16	17	18
March 5, 1924	March 16, 1942	March 27, 1960
19	20	21
April 7, 1978	April 17, 1996	April 29, 2014
22	23	24
May 9, 2032	May 20, 2050	May 31, 2068
25	26	27
June 11, 2086	June 22, 2104	July 4, 2122
28	29	30
July 14, 2140	July 25, 2158	August 4, 2176
31
August 16, 2194

=== Metonic series ===
The metonic series repeats eclipses every 19 years (6939.69 days), lasting about 5 cycles. Eclipses occur in nearly the same calendar date. In addition, the octon subseries repeats 1/5 of that or every 3.8 years (1387.94 days). All eclipses in this table occur at the Moon's descending node.

22 eclipse events between April 8, 1902 and August 31, 1989
April 7–8	January 24–25	November 12	August 31–September 1	June 19–20
108	110	112	114	116
April 8, 1902			August 31, 1913	June 19, 1917
118	120	122	124	126
April 8, 1921	January 24, 1925	November 12, 1928	August 31, 1932	June 19, 1936
128	130	132	134	136
April 7, 1940	January 25, 1944	November 12, 1947	September 1, 1951	June 20, 1955
138	140	142	144	146
April 8, 1959	January 25, 1963	November 12, 1966	August 31, 1970	June 20, 1974
148	150	152	154	
April 7, 1978	January 25, 1982	November 12, 1985	August 31, 1989	

=== Tritos series ===
This eclipse is a part of a tritos cycle, repeating at alternating nodes every 135 synodic months (≈ 3986.63 days, or 11 years minus 1 month). Their appearance and longitude are irregular due to a lack of synchronization with the anomalistic month (period of perigee), but groupings of 3 tritos cycles (≈ 33 years minus 3 months) come close (≈ 434.044 anomalistic months), so eclipses are similar in these groupings.

Series members between 1801 and 2087
August 17, 1803 (Saros 132)	July 17, 1814 (Saros 133)	June 16, 1825 (Saros 134)	May 15, 1836 (Saros 135)	April 15, 1847 (Saros 136)
March 15, 1858 (Saros 137)	February 11, 1869 (Saros 138)	January 11, 1880 (Saros 139)	December 12, 1890 (Saros 140)	November 11, 1901 (Saros 141)
October 10, 1912 (Saros 142)	September 10, 1923 (Saros 143)	August 10, 1934 (Saros 144)	July 9, 1945 (Saros 145)	June 8, 1956 (Saros 146)
May 9, 1967 (Saros 147)	April 7, 1978 (Saros 148)	March 7, 1989 (Saros 149)	February 5, 2000 (Saros 150)	January 4, 2011 (Saros 151)
December 4, 2021 (Saros 152)	November 3, 2032 (Saros 153)	October 3, 2043 (Saros 154)	September 2, 2054 (Saros 155)	August 2, 2065 (Saros 156)
July 1, 2076 (Saros 157)	June 1, 2087 (Saros 158)			

=== Inex series ===
This eclipse is a part of the long period inex cycle, repeating at alternating nodes, every 358 synodic months (≈ 10,571.95 days, or 29 years minus 20 days). Their appearance and longitude are irregular due to a lack of synchronization with the anomalistic month (period of perigee). However, groupings of 3 inex cycles (≈ 87 years minus 2 months) comes close (≈ 1,151.02 anomalistic months), so eclipses are similar in these groupings.

Series members between 1801 and 2200
August 5, 1804 (Saros 142)	July 17, 1833 (Saros 143)	June 27, 1862 (Saros 144)
June 6, 1891 (Saros 145)	May 18, 1920 (Saros 146)	April 28, 1949 (Saros 147)
April 7, 1978 (Saros 148)	March 19, 2007 (Saros 149)	February 27, 2036 (Saros 150)
February 5, 2065 (Saros 151)	January 16, 2094 (Saros 152)	December 28, 2122 (Saros 153)
December 8, 2151 (Saros 154)	November 17, 2180 (Saros 155)	
