= Solar eclipse of December 26, 2057 =

Total eclipse

- Total eclipse
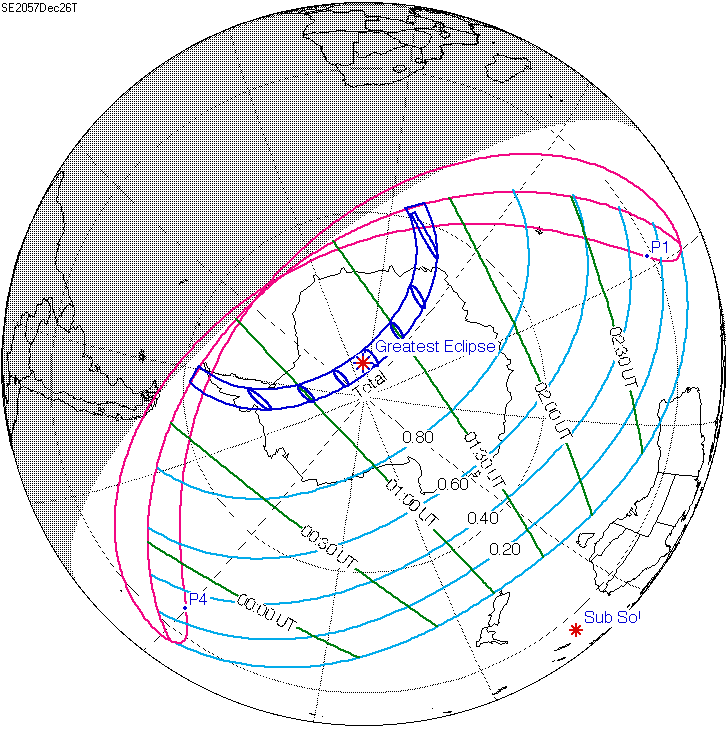
- Map
- Gamma: −0.9405
- Magnitude: 1.0348

Maximum eclipse
- Duration: 110 s (1 min 50 s)
- Coordinates: 84.9°S 21.8°E
- Max. width of band: 355 km (221 mi)

Times (UTC)
- Greatest eclipse: 1:14:35

References
- Saros: 152 (15 of 70)
- Catalog # (SE5000): 9636

A total solar eclipse will occur at the Moon's descending node of orbit between Tuesday, December 25 and Wednesday, December 26, 2057, with a magnitude of 1.0348. A solar eclipse occurs when the Moon passes between Earth and the Sun, thereby totally or partly obscuring the image of the Sun for a viewer on Earth. A total solar eclipse occurs when the Moon's apparent diameter is larger than the Sun's, blocking all direct sunlight, turning day into darkness. Totality occurs in a narrow path across Earth's surface, with the partial solar eclipse visible over a surrounding region thousands of kilometres wide. Occurring about 6.5 hours before perigee (on December 26, 2057, at 7:50 UTC), the Moon's apparent diameter will be larger.

The path of totality will be visible from parts of Antarctica. A partial solar eclipse will also be visible for parts of Antarctica. In some parts of the world it will fall on Christmas Day, the first such eclipse since 2038, and the last until 2307.

== Eclipse details ==
Shown below are two tables displaying details about this particular solar eclipse. The first table outlines times at which the Moon's penumbra or umbra attains the specific parameter, and the second table describes various other parameters pertaining to this eclipse.

December 26, 2057 Solar Eclipse Times
Event	Time (UTC)
First Penumbral External Contact	2057 December 25 at 23:09:17.3 UTC
First Umbral External Contact	2057 December 26 at 00:38:01.5 UTC
First Central Line	2057 December 26 at 00:40:19.3 UTC
First Umbral Internal Contact	2057 December 26 at 00:42:45.9 UTC
Greatest Eclipse	2057 December 26 at 01:14:35.2 UTC
Greatest Duration	2057 December 26 at 01:14:43.0 UTC
Equatorial Conjunction	2057 December 26 at 01:20:32.3 UTC
Ecliptic Conjunction	2057 December 26 at 01:24:01.7 UTC
Last Umbral Internal Contact	2057 December 26 at 01:46:20.1 UTC
Last Central Line	2057 December 26 at 01:48:47.1 UTC
Last Umbral External Contact	2057 December 26 at 01:51:05.3 UTC
Last Penumbral External Contact	2057 December 26 at 03:19:49.8 UTC

December 26, 2057 Solar Eclipse Parameters
Parameter	Value
Eclipse Magnitude	1.03478
Eclipse Obscuration	1.07077
Gamma	−0.94050
Sun Right Ascension	18h20m37.6s
Sun Declination	-23°20'50.0"
Sun Semi-Diameter	16'15.6"
Sun Equatorial Horizontal Parallax	08.9"
Moon Right Ascension	18h20m22.1s
Moon Declination	-24°18'21.4"
Moon Semi-Diameter	16'44.3"
Moon Equatorial Horizontal Parallax	1°01'25.8"
ΔT	89.1 s

== Eclipse season ==
This eclipse is part of an eclipse season, a period, roughly every six months, when eclipses occur. Only two (or occasionally three) eclipse seasons occur each year, and each season lasts about 35 days and repeats just short of six months (173 days) later; thus two full eclipse seasons always occur each year. Either two or three eclipses happen each eclipse season. In the sequence below, each eclipse is separated by a fortnight.

Eclipse season of December 2057
December 11 Ascending node (full moon)	December 26 Descending node (new moon)
Partial lunar eclipse Lunar Saros 126	Total solar eclipse Solar Saros 152

== Related eclipses ==
=== Eclipses in 2057 ===
- A total solar eclipse on January 5.
- A partial lunar eclipse on June 17.
- An annular solar eclipse on July 1.
- A partial lunar eclipse on December 11.
- A total solar eclipse on December 26.

=== Metonic ===
- Preceded by: Solar eclipse of March 9, 2054
- Followed by: Solar eclipse of October 13, 2061

=== Tzolkinex ===
- Preceded by: Solar eclipse of November 14, 2050
- Followed by: Solar eclipse of February 5, 2065

=== Half-Saros ===
- Preceded by: Lunar eclipse of December 20, 2048
- Followed by: Lunar eclipse of December 31, 2066

=== Tritos ===
- Preceded by: Solar eclipse of January 26, 2047
- Followed by: Solar eclipse of November 24, 2068

=== Solar Saros 152 ===
- Preceded by: Solar eclipse of December 15, 2039
- Followed by: Solar eclipse of January 6, 2076

=== Inex ===
- Preceded by: Solar eclipse of January 14, 2029
- Followed by: Solar eclipse of December 6, 2086

=== Triad ===
- Preceded by: Solar eclipse of February 25, 1971
- Followed by: Solar eclipse of October 26, 2144

=== Solar eclipses of 2054–2058 ===
This eclipse is a member of a semester series. An eclipse in a semester series of solar eclipses repeats approximately every 177 days and 4 hours (a semester) at alternating nodes of the Moon's orbit.

The partial solar eclipses on March 9, 2054 and September 2, 2054 occur in the previous lunar year eclipse set, and the partial solar eclipses on May 22, 2058 and November 16, 2058 occur in the next lunar year eclipse set.

Solar eclipse series sets from 2054 to 2058
Ascending node			Descending node		
Saros	Map	Gamma	Saros	Map	Gamma
117	August 3, 2054 Partial	−1.4941	122	January 27, 2055 Partial	1.155
127	July 24, 2055 Total	−0.8012	132	January 16, 2056 Annular	0.4199
137	July 12, 2056 Annular	−0.0426	142	January 5, 2057 Total	−0.2837
147	July 1, 2057 Annular	0.7455	152	December 26, 2057 Total	−0.9405
157	June 21, 2058 Partial	1.4869			

=== Saros 152 ===
This eclipse is a part of Saros series 152, repeating every 18 years, 11 days, and containing 70 events. The series started with a partial solar eclipse on July 26, 1805. It contains total eclipses from November 2, 1967 through September 14, 2490; hybrid eclipses from September 26, 2508 through October 17, 2544; and annular eclipses from October 29, 2562 through June 16, 2941. The series ends at member 70 as a partial eclipse on August 20, 3049. Its eclipses are tabulated in three columns; every third eclipse in the same column is one exeligmos apart, so they all cast shadows over approximately the same parts of the Earth.

The longest duration of totality will be produced by member 30 at 5 minutes, 16 seconds on June 9, 2328, and the longest duration of annularity will be produced by member 53 at 5 minutes, 20 seconds on February 16, 2743. All eclipses in this series occur at the Moon’s descending node of orbit.

Series members 1–22 occur between 1805 and 2200:
1	2	3
July 26, 1805	August 6, 1823	August 16, 1841
4	5	6
August 28, 1859	September 7, 1877	September 18, 1895
7	8	9
September 30, 1913	October 11, 1931	October 21, 1949
10	11	12
November 2, 1967	November 12, 1985	November 23, 2003
13	14	15
December 4, 2021	December 15, 2039	December 26, 2057
16	17	18
January 6, 2076	January 16, 2094	January 29, 2112
19	20	21
February 8, 2130	February 19, 2148	March 2, 2166
22
March 12, 2184

=== Metonic series ===
The metonic series repeats eclipses every 19 years (6939.69 days), lasting about 5 cycles. Eclipses occur in nearly the same calendar date. In addition, the octon subseries repeats 1/5 of that or every 3.8 years (1387.94 days). All eclipses in this table occur at the Moon's descending node.

21 eclipse events between May 21, 1993 and May 20, 2069
May 20–21	March 9	December 25–26	October 13–14	August 1–2
118	120	122	124	126
May 21, 1993	March 9, 1997	December 25, 2000	October 14, 2004	August 1, 2008
128	130	132	134	136
May 20, 2012	March 9, 2016	December 26, 2019	October 14, 2023	August 2, 2027
138	140	142	144	146
May 21, 2031	March 9, 2035	December 26, 2038	October 14, 2042	August 2, 2046
148	150	152	154	156
May 20, 2050	March 9, 2054	December 26, 2057	October 13, 2061	August 2, 2065
158
May 20, 2069

=== Tritos series ===
This eclipse is a part of a tritos cycle, repeating at alternating nodes every 135 synodic months (≈ 3986.63 days, or 11 years minus 1 month). Their appearance and longitude are irregular due to a lack of synchronization with the anomalistic month (period of perigee), but groupings of 3 tritos cycles (≈ 33 years minus 3 months) come close (≈ 434.044 anomalistic months), so eclipses are similar in these groupings.

The partial solar eclipses on December 18, 2188 (part of Saros 164) and November 18, 2199 (part of Saros 165) are also a part of this series but are not included in the table below.

Series members between 1801 and 2134
December 10, 1806 (Saros 129)	November 9, 1817 (Saros 130)	October 9, 1828 (Saros 131)	September 7, 1839 (Saros 132)	August 7, 1850 (Saros 133)
July 8, 1861 (Saros 134)	June 6, 1872 (Saros 135)	May 6, 1883 (Saros 136)	April 6, 1894 (Saros 137)	March 6, 1905 (Saros 138)
February 3, 1916 (Saros 139)	January 3, 1927 (Saros 140)	December 2, 1937 (Saros 141)	November 1, 1948 (Saros 142)	October 2, 1959 (Saros 143)
August 31, 1970 (Saros 144)	July 31, 1981 (Saros 145)	June 30, 1992 (Saros 146)	May 31, 2003 (Saros 147)	April 29, 2014 (Saros 148)
March 29, 2025 (Saros 149)	February 27, 2036 (Saros 150)	January 26, 2047 (Saros 151)	December 26, 2057 (Saros 152)	November 24, 2068 (Saros 153)
October 24, 2079 (Saros 154)	September 23, 2090 (Saros 155)	August 24, 2101 (Saros 156)	July 23, 2112 (Saros 157)	June 23, 2123 (Saros 158)
May 23, 2134 (Saros 159)

=== Inex series ===
This eclipse is a part of the long period inex cycle, repeating at alternating nodes, every 358 synodic months (≈ 10,571.95 days, or 29 years minus 20 days). Their appearance and longitude are irregular due to a lack of synchronization with the anomalistic month (period of perigee). However, groupings of 3 inex cycles (≈ 87 years minus 2 months) comes close (≈ 1,151.02 anomalistic months), so eclipses are similar in these groupings.

Series members between 1801 and 2200
June 5, 1826 (Saros 144)	May 16, 1855 (Saros 145)	April 25, 1884 (Saros 146)
April 6, 1913 (Saros 147)	March 16, 1942 (Saros 148)	February 25, 1971 (Saros 149)
February 5, 2000 (Saros 150)	January 14, 2029 (Saros 151)	December 26, 2057 (Saros 152)
December 6, 2086 (Saros 153)	November 16, 2115 (Saros 154)	October 26, 2144 (Saros 155)
October 7, 2173 (Saros 156)		
