= Solar eclipse of November 12, 1985 =

Total eclipse

- Total eclipse
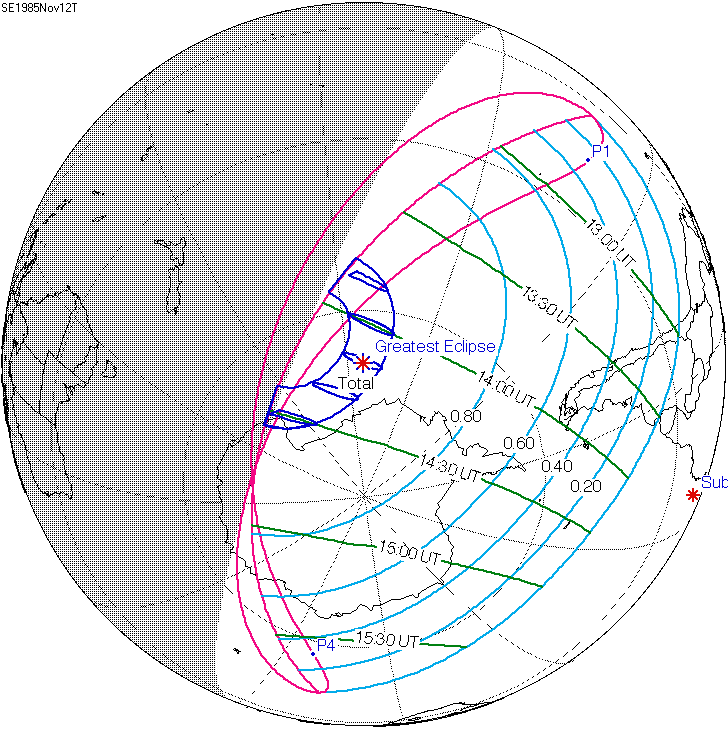
- Map
- Gamma: −0.9795
- Magnitude: 1.0388

Maximum eclipse
- Duration: 119 s (1 min 59 s)
- Coordinates: 68.6°S 142.6°W
- Max. width of band: 690 km (430 mi)

Times (UTC)
- Greatest eclipse: 14:11:27

References
- Saros: 152 (11 of 70)
- Catalog # (SE5000): 9477

A total solar eclipse occurred at the Moon's descending node of orbit on Tuesday, November 12, 1985, with a magnitude of 1.0388. A solar eclipse occurs when the Moon passes between Earth and the Sun, thereby totally or partly obscuring the image of the Sun for a viewer on Earth. A total solar eclipse occurs when the Moon's apparent diameter is larger than the Sun's, blocking all direct sunlight, turning day into darkness. Totality occurs in a narrow path across Earth's surface, with the partial solar eclipse visible over a surrounding region thousands of kilometres wide. Occurring about 2 hours after perigee (on November 12, 1985, at 12:30 UTC), the Moon's apparent diameter was larger. Perigee did occur during the early portion of the eclipse.

Totality was visible only near Antarctica. A partial eclipse was visible for parts of southern South America and Antarctica.

== Eclipse details ==
Shown below are two tables displaying details about this particular solar eclipse. The first table outlines times at which the Moon's penumbra or umbra attains the specific parameter, and the second table describes various other parameters pertaining to this eclipse.

November 12, 1985 Solar Eclipse Times
Event	Time (UTC)
First Penumbral External Contact	1985 November 12 at 12:09:38.7 UTC
First Umbral External Contact	1985 November 12 at 13:47:16.4 UTC
First Central Line	1985 November 12 at 13:51:51.3 UTC
First Umbral Internal Contact	1985 November 12 at 13:57:51.7 UTC
Greatest Duration	1985 November 12 at 14:11:16.8 UTC
Greatest Eclipse	1985 November 12 at 14:11:26.9 UTC
Ecliptic Conjunction	1985 November 12 at 14:21:15.4 UTC
Equatorial Conjunction	1985 November 12 at 14:50:17.6 UTC
Last Umbral Internal Contact	1985 November 12 at 14:24:37.2 UTC
Last Central Line	1985 November 12 at 14:30:37.7 UTC
Last Umbral External Contact	1985 November 12 at 14:35:12.6 UTC
Last Penumbral External Contact	1985 November 12 at 16:12:59.3 UTC

November 12, 1985 Solar Eclipse Parameters
Parameter	Value
Eclipse Magnitude	1.03880
Eclipse Obscuration	1.07910
Gamma	−0.97948
Sun Right Ascension	15h10m46.7s
Sun Declination	-17°46'51.7"
Sun Semi-Diameter	16'09.6"
Sun Equatorial Horizontal Parallax	08.9"
Moon Right Ascension	15h09m15.4s
Moon Declination	-18°42'51.3"
Moon Semi-Diameter	16'44.5"
Moon Equatorial Horizontal Parallax	1°01'26.6"
ΔT	54.8 s

== Eclipse season ==
This eclipse is part of an eclipse season, a period, roughly every six months, when eclipses occur. Only two (or occasionally three) eclipse seasons occur each year, and each season lasts about 35 days and repeats just short of six months (173 days) later; thus two full eclipse seasons always occur each year. Either two or three eclipses happen each eclipse season. In the sequence below, each eclipse is separated by a fortnight.

Eclipse season of October–November 1985
October 28 Ascending node (full moon)	November 12 Descending node (new moon)
Total lunar eclipse Lunar Saros 126	Total solar eclipse Solar Saros 152

== Related eclipses ==
=== Eclipses in 1985 ===
- A total lunar eclipse on May 4.
- A partial solar eclipse on May 19.
- A total lunar eclipse on October 28.
- A total solar eclipse on November 12.

=== Metonic ===
- Preceded by: Solar eclipse of January 25, 1982
- Followed by: Solar eclipse of August 31, 1989

=== Tzolkinex ===
- Preceded by: Solar eclipse of October 2, 1978
- Followed by: Solar eclipse of December 24, 1992

=== Half-Saros ===
- Preceded by: Lunar eclipse of November 6, 1976
- Followed by: Lunar eclipse of November 18, 1994

=== Tritos ===
- Preceded by: Solar eclipse of December 13, 1974
- Followed by: Solar eclipse of October 12, 1996

=== Solar Saros 152 ===
- Preceded by: Solar eclipse of November 2, 1967
- Followed by: Solar eclipse of November 23, 2003

=== Inex ===
- Preceded by: Solar eclipse of December 2, 1956
- Followed by: Solar eclipse of October 23, 2014

=== Triad ===
- Preceded by: Solar eclipse of January 11, 1899
- Followed by: Solar eclipse of September 12, 2072

=== Solar eclipses of 1982–1985 ===
This eclipse is a member of a semester series. An eclipse in a semester series of solar eclipses repeats approximately every 177 days and 4 hours (a semester) at alternating nodes of the Moon's orbit.

The partial solar eclipses on January 25, 1982 and July 20, 1982 occur in the previous lunar year eclipse set.

Solar eclipse series sets from 1982 to 1985
Ascending node			Descending node		
Saros	Map	Gamma	Saros	Map	Gamma
117	June 21, 1982 Partial	−1.2102	122	December 15, 1982 Partial	1.1293
127	June 11, 1983 Total	−0.4947	132	December 4, 1983 Annular	0.4015
137	May 30, 1984 Annular	0.2755	142 Partial in Gisborne, New Zealand	November 22, 1984 Total	−0.3132
147	May 19, 1985 Partial	1.072	152	November 12, 1985 Total	−0.9795

=== Saros 152 ===
This eclipse is a part of Saros series 152, repeating every 18 years, 11 days, and containing 70 events. The series started with a partial solar eclipse on July 26, 1805. It contains total eclipses from November 2, 1967 through September 14, 2490; hybrid eclipses from September 26, 2508 through October 17, 2544; and annular eclipses from October 29, 2562 through June 16, 2941. The series ends at member 70 as a partial eclipse on August 20, 3049. Its eclipses are tabulated in three columns; every third eclipse in the same column is one exeligmos apart, so they all cast shadows over approximately the same parts of the Earth.

The longest duration of totality will be produced by member 30 at 5 minutes, 16 seconds on June 9, 2328, and the longest duration of annularity will be produced by member 53 at 5 minutes, 20 seconds on February 16, 2743. All eclipses in this series occur at the Moon’s descending node of orbit.

Series members 1–22 occur between 1805 and 2200:
1	2	3
July 26, 1805	August 6, 1823	August 16, 1841
4	5	6
August 28, 1859	September 7, 1877	September 18, 1895
7	8	9
September 30, 1913	October 11, 1931	October 21, 1949
10	11	12
November 2, 1967	November 12, 1985	November 23, 2003
13	14	15
December 4, 2021	December 15, 2039	December 26, 2057
16	17	18
January 6, 2076	January 16, 2094	January 29, 2112
19	20	21
February 8, 2130	February 19, 2148	March 2, 2166
22
March 12, 2184

=== Metonic series ===
The metonic series repeats eclipses every 19 years (6939.69 days), lasting about 5 cycles. Eclipses occur in nearly the same calendar date. In addition, the octon subseries repeats 1/5 of that or every 3.8 years (1387.94 days). All eclipses in this table occur at the Moon's descending node.

22 eclipse events between April 8, 1902 and August 31, 1989
April 7–8	January 24–25	November 12	August 31–September 1	June 19–20
108	110	112	114	116
April 8, 1902			August 31, 1913	June 19, 1917
118	120	122	124	126
April 8, 1921	January 24, 1925	November 12, 1928	August 31, 1932	June 19, 1936
128	130	132	134	136
April 7, 1940	January 25, 1944	November 12, 1947	September 1, 1951	June 20, 1955
138	140	142	144	146
April 8, 1959	January 25, 1963	November 12, 1966	August 31, 1970	June 20, 1974
148	150	152	154	
April 7, 1978	January 25, 1982	November 12, 1985	August 31, 1989	

=== Tritos series ===
This eclipse is a part of a tritos cycle, repeating at alternating nodes every 135 synodic months (≈ 3986.63 days, or 11 years minus 1 month). Their appearance and longitude are irregular due to a lack of synchronization with the anomalistic month (period of perigee), but groupings of 3 tritos cycles (≈ 33 years minus 3 months) come close (≈ 434.044 anomalistic months), so eclipses are similar in these groupings.

The partial solar eclipse on November 4, 2116 (part of Saros 164) is also a part of this series but is not included in the table below.

Series members between 1801 and 2029
March 24, 1811 (Saros 136)	February 21, 1822 (Saros 137)	January 20, 1833 (Saros 138)	December 21, 1843 (Saros 139)	November 20, 1854 (Saros 140)
October 19, 1865 (Saros 141)	September 17, 1876 (Saros 142)	August 19, 1887 (Saros 143)	July 18, 1898 (Saros 144)	June 17, 1909 (Saros 145)
May 18, 1920 (Saros 146)	April 18, 1931 (Saros 147)	March 16, 1942 (Saros 148)	February 14, 1953 (Saros 149)	January 14, 1964 (Saros 150)
December 13, 1974 (Saros 151)	November 12, 1985 (Saros 152)	October 12, 1996 (Saros 153)	September 11, 2007 (Saros 154)	August 11, 2018 (Saros 155)
July 11, 2029 (Saros 156)

=== Inex series ===
This eclipse is a part of the long period inex cycle, repeating at alternating nodes, every 358 synodic months (≈ 10,571.95 days, or 29 years minus 20 days). Their appearance and longitude are irregular due to a lack of synchronization with the anomalistic month (period of perigee). However, groupings of 3 inex cycles (≈ 87 years minus 2 months) comes close (≈ 1,151.02 anomalistic months), so eclipses are similar in these groupings.

Series members between 1801 and 2200
March 13, 1812 (Saros 146)	February 21, 1841 (Saros 147)	January 31, 1870 (Saros 148)
January 11, 1899 (Saros 149)	December 24, 1927 (Saros 150)	December 2, 1956 (Saros 151)
November 12, 1985 (Saros 152)	October 23, 2014 (Saros 153)	October 3, 2043 (Saros 154)
September 12, 2072 (Saros 155)	August 24, 2101 (Saros 156)	August 4, 2130 (Saros 157)
July 15, 2159 (Saros 158)	June 24, 2188 (Saros 159)	
