= Solar Saros 152 =

Saros cycle series 152 for solar eclipses

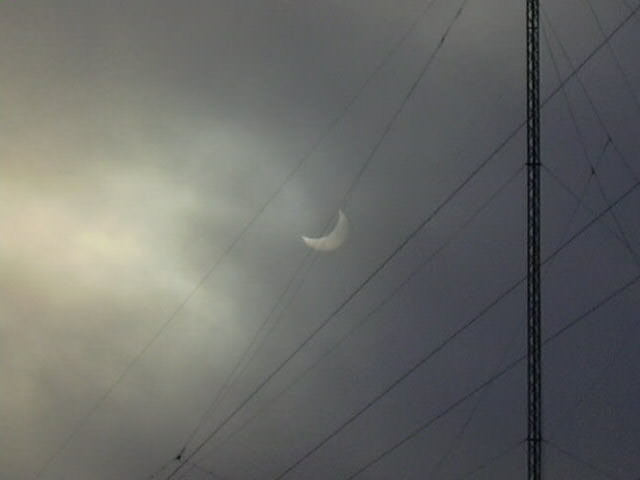
November 23, 2003 Partial eclipse Member 12

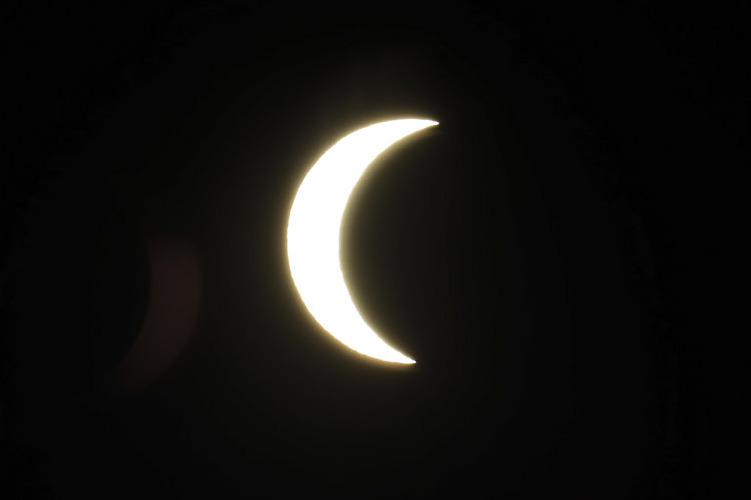
December 4, 2021 Partial off South Georgia Member 13

Animation of the series

Saros cycle series 152 for solar eclipses occurs at the Moon's descending node, repeating every 18 years, 11 days, containing 70 eclipses, 55 of which will be umbral (30 total, 3 hybrid, 22 annular). The first eclipse in the series was on 26 July 1805 and the last will be on 20 August 3049. The most recent eclipse was a total eclipse on 4 December 2021 and the next will be a total eclipse on 15 December 2039.

The longest totality will be 5 minutes 16 seconds on 9 June 2328 and the longest annular will be 5 minutes 20 seconds on 16 February 2743.

This solar saros is linked to Lunar Saros 145.

== Umbral eclipses ==
Umbral eclipses (annular, total and hybrid) can be further classified as either: 1) Central (two limits), 2) Central (one limit) or 3) Non-Central (one limit). The statistical distribution of these classes in Saros series 152 appears in the following table.

Classification	Number	Percent
All Umbral eclipses	55	100.00%
Central (two limits)	53	96.36%
Central (one limit)	0	0.00%
Non-central (one limit)	2	3.64%

== All eclipses ==
Saros	Member	Date	Time (Greatest) UTC	Type	Location Lat, Long	Gamma	Mag.	Width (km)	Duration (min:sec)	Ref
152	1	July 26, 1805	6:14:19	Partial	63.2S 42.8E	-1.4571	0.1405			
152	2	August 6, 1823	13:45:42	Partial	62.5S 79.3W	-1.3871	0.2753			
152	3	August 16, 1841	21:20:24	Partial	61.9S 158E	-1.3193	0.4059			
152	4	August 28, 1859	5:02:00	Partial	61.5S 33.7E	-1.2569	0.5261			
152	5	September 7, 1877	12:48:42	Partial	61.2S 91.8W	-1.1985	0.6382			
152	6	September 18, 1895	20:44:01	Partial	61S 140.7E	-1.1469	0.7369			
152	7	September 30, 1913	4:45:49	Partial	61S 11.6E	-1.1005	0.8252			
152	8	October 11, 1931	12:55:40	Partial	61.2S 119.5W	-1.0607	0.9005			
152	9	October 21, 1949	21:13:01	Partial	61.5S 107.5E	-1.027	0.9638			
152	10	November 2, 1967	5:38:56	Total (Note: Non-central)	62S 27.8W	1.0007	1.0126	-	-	
152	11	November 12, 1985	14:11:27	Total	68.6S 142.6W	-0.9795	1.0388	690	1m 59s	
152	12	November 23, 2003	22:50:22	Total	72.7S 88.4E	-0.9638	1.0379	495	1m 57s	
152	13	December 4, 2021	7:34:38	Total	76.8S 46.2W	-0.9526	1.0367	419	1m 54s	
152	14	December 15, 2039	16:23:46	Total	80.9S 172.8E	-0.9458	1.0356	380	1m 51s	
152	15	December 25–26, 2057	1:14:35	Total	84.9S 21.8E	-0.9405	1.0348	355	1m 50s	
152	16	January 6, 2076	10:07:27	Total	87.2S 173.7W	-0.9373	1.0342	340	1m 49s	
152	17	January 16, 2094	18:59:03	Total	84.8S 10.6W	-0.9333	1.0342	329	1m 51s	
152	18	January 29, 2112	3:49:52	Total	80.6S 163.8W	-0.9292	1.0346	322	1m 56s	
152	19	February 8, 2130	12:35:23	Total	75.9S 51.8E	-0.9212	1.0356	313	2m 3s	
152	20	February 19, 2148	21:18:00	Total	70.9S 88.3W	-0.9111	1.037	305	2m 13s	
152	21	March 2, 2166	5:53:21	Total	65.4S 134.4E	-0.8958	1.0388	294	2m 26s	
152	22	March 12, 2184	14:22:32	Total	59.4S 0.2W	-0.8755	1.0409	283	2m 43s	
152	23	March 24, 2202	22:42:58	Total	52.9S 131.9W	-0.8484	1.0431	271	3m 3s	
152	24	April 4, 2220	6:56:42	Total	46.2S 99E	-0.8162	1.0454	260	3m 25s	
152	25	April 15, 2238	15:01:45	Total	39.3S 27.3W	-0.7772	1.0475	250	3m 49s	
152	26	April 25, 2256	22:58:35	Total	32.3S 150.9W	-0.7317	1.0495	240	4m 14s	
152	27	May 7, 2274	6:47:37	Total	25.5S 88.2E	-0.6799	1.051	230	4m 37s	
152	28	May 17, 2292	14:29:33	Total	18.8S 30.3W	-0.6224	1.0521	220	4m 57s	
152	29	May 29, 2310	22:04:50	Total	12.5S 146.5W	-0.5599	1.0526	210	5m 10s	
152	30	June 9, 2328	5:33:53	Total	6.7S 99.5E	-0.4928	1.0524	199	5m 16s	
152	31	June 20, 2346	12:58:44	Total	1.5S 12.7W	-0.4224	1.0515	188	5m 12s	
152	32	June 30, 2364	20:19:48	Total	2.9N 123.3W	-0.3494	1.0499	176	5m 0s	
152	33	July 12, 2382	3:37:51	Total	6.5N 127.5E	-0.2744	1.0475	164	4m 41s	
152	34	July 22, 2400	10:54:48	Total	9.1N 19E	-0.1992	1.0444	151	4m 17s	
152	35	August 2, 2418	18:11:10	Total	10.9N 89W	-0.1242	1.0406	137	3m 50s	
152	36	August 12, 2436	1:29:33	Total	11.8N 162.8E	-0.0517	1.0361	122	3m 21s	
152	37	August 24, 2454	8:48:47	Total	11.9N 54.3E	0.0194	1.031	105	2m 50s	
152	38	September 3, 2472	16:12:54	Total	11.3N 55.4W	0.0857	1.0255	87	2m 19s	
152	39	September 14, 2490	23:40:38	Total	10.3N 166.2W	0.1483	1.0195	67	1m 47s	
152	40	September 26, 2508	7:14:51	Hybrid	9N 81.2E	0.2046	1.0134	47	1m 14s	
152	41	October 7, 2526	14:54:21	Hybrid	7.5N 33W	0.2557	1.007	25	0m 40s	
152	42	October 17, 2544	22:41:14	Hybrid	5.9N 149.2W	0.3001	1.0006	2	0m 4s	
152	43	October 29, 2562	6:34:40	Annular	4.6N 92.7E	0.3382	0.9943	21	0m 35s	
152	44	November 8, 2580	14:34:19	Annular	3.4N 27.1W	0.3704	0.9883	44	1m 15s	
152	45	November 19, 2598	22:41:03	Annular	2.6N 148.8W	0.3959	0.9825	67	1m 57s	
152	46	December 1, 2616	6:53:19	Annular	2.1N 88E	0.4156	0.9772	89	2m 39s	
152	47	December 12, 2634	15:11:13	Annular	2.2N 36.7W	0.4303	0.9723	110	3m 19s	
152	48	December 22, 2652	23:31:17	Annular	2.8N 162W	0.4424	0.968	128	3m 56s	
152	49	January 3, 2671	7:55:01	Annular	4N 71.7E	0.4505	0.9643	144	4m 27s	
152	50	January 13, 2689	16:18:41	Annular	5.9N 54.7W	0.4578	0.9612	158	4m 52s	
152	51	January 25, 2707	0:42:05	Annular	8.5N 178.7E	0.4646	0.9587	169	5m 8s	
152	52	February 5, 2725	9:02:01	Annular	11.8N 52.9E	0.4734	0.9567	178	5m 17s	
152	53	February 16, 2743	17:18:53	Annular	15.8N 72.4W	0.4842	0.9553	185	5m 20s	
152	54	February 26, 2761	1:29:39	Annular	20.4N 163.7E	0.4993	0.9543	191	5m 17s	
152	55	March 10, 2779	9:33:37	Annular	25.7N 41.3E	0.5193	0.9537	196	5m 10s	
152	56	March 20, 2797	17:29:20	Annular	31.6N 79.2W	0.5454	0.9533	202	5m 0s	
152	57	March 31, 2815	1:17:07	Annular	38N 162.2E	0.5774	0.9532	208	4m 48s	
152	58	April 11, 2833	8:54:12	Annular	45N 46.3E	0.6177	0.9531	217	4m 34s	
152	59	April 22, 2851	16:22:32	Annular	52.4N 67.3W	0.6644	0.9529	230	4m 20s	
152	60	May 2, 2869	23:40:23	Annular	60.4N 178.2W	0.7192	0.9525	250	4m 5s	
152	61	May 14, 2887	6:50:27	Annular	69N 73.3E	0.7793	0.9518	283	3m 52s	
152	62	May 25, 2905	13:49:06	Annular	78.6N 32.5W	0.8482	0.9505	346	3m 39s	
152	63	June 5, 2923	20:41:46	Annular	89.5N 150E	0.921	0.9483	498	3m 28s	
152	64	June 16, 2941	3:25:38	Annular (Note: Non-central)	66.4N 43.9W	1.0004	0.9657	-	-	
152	65	June 27, 2959	10:05:42	Partial	65.4N 153.5W	1.0817	0.8254			
152	66	July 7, 2977	16:38:49	Partial	64.5N 99E	1.1677	0.6768			
152	67	July 18, 2995	23:11:40	Partial	63.7N 8.1W	1.2531	0.5297			
152	68	July 30, 3013	5:41:19	Partial	62.9N 114.2W	1.3404	0.3798			
152	69	August 10, 3031	12:12:15	Partial	62.3N 139.7E	1.4257	0.2339			
152	70	August 20, 3049	18:43:31	Partial	61.8N 33.6W	1.5098	0.0906			
