= January 1973 lunar eclipse =

Penumbral lunar eclipse

- Penumbral eclipse
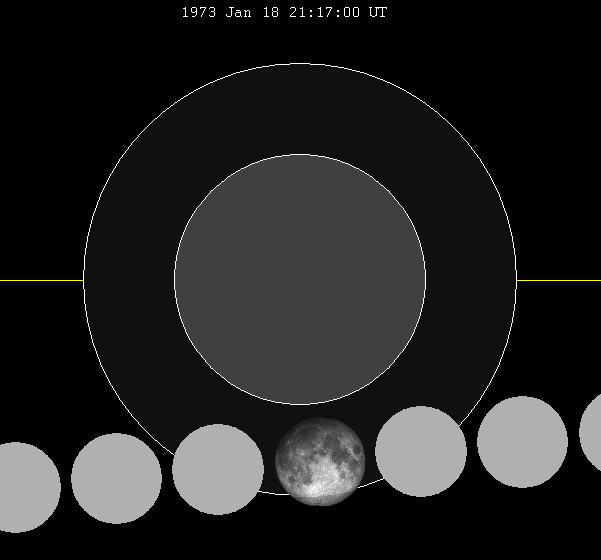
- The Moon's hourly motion shown right to left
- Date: January 18, 1973
- Gamma: −1.0845
- Magnitude: −0.1292
- Saros cycle: 143 (16 of 73)
- Penumbral: 236 minutes, 29 seconds
Contacts (UTC)
- P1: 19:18:59
- Greatest: 21:17:15
- P4: 23:15:27

A penumbral lunar eclipse occurred at the Moon’s descending node of orbit on Thursday, January 18, 1973, with an umbral magnitude of −0.1292. A lunar eclipse occurs when the Moon moves into the Earth's shadow, causing the Moon to be darkened. A penumbral lunar eclipse occurs when part or all of the Moon's near side passes into the Earth's penumbra. Unlike a solar eclipse, which can only be viewed from a relatively small area of the world, a lunar eclipse may be viewed from anywhere on the night side of Earth. Occurring about 2 days after perigee (on January 16, 1973, at 20:50 UTC), the Moon's apparent diameter was larger.

This eclipse was the first of four lunar eclipses in 1973, with the others occurring on June 15 (penumbral), July 15 (penumbral), and December 10 (partial).

== Visibility ==
The eclipse was completely visible over Europe, Africa, and Asia, seen rising over eastern North America and much of South America and setting over east Asia and Australia.

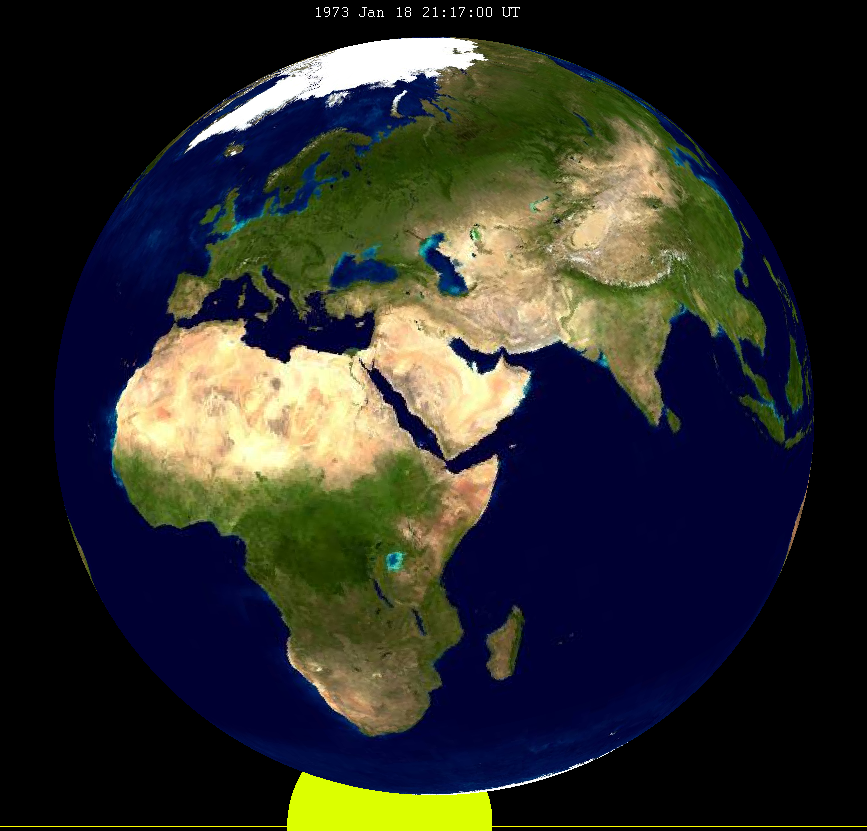
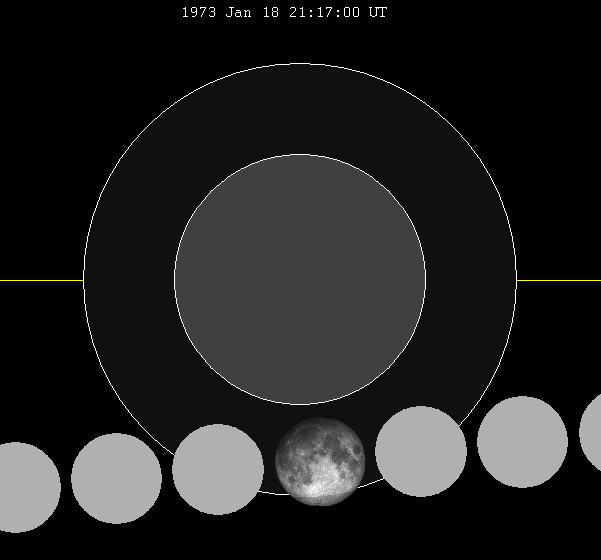

== Eclipse details ==
Shown below is a table displaying details about this particular solar eclipse. It describes various parameters pertaining to this eclipse.

January 18, 1973 Lunar Eclipse Parameters
| Parameter | Value |
|---|---|
| Penumbral Magnitude | 0.86555 |
| Umbral Magnitude | −0.12922 |
| Gamma | −1.08446 |
| Sun Right Ascension | 20h03m09.2s |
| Sun Declination | -20°25'53.6" |
| Sun Semi-Diameter | 16'15.4" |
| Sun Equatorial Horizontal Parallax | 08.9" |
| Moon Right Ascension | 08h01m47.2s |
| Moon Declination | +19°23'46.9" |
| Moon Semi-Diameter | 16'20.5" |
| Moon Equatorial Horizontal Parallax | 0°59'58.5" |
| ΔT | 43.4 s |

== Eclipse season ==
This eclipse is part of an eclipse season, a period, roughly every six months, when eclipses occur. Only two (or occasionally three) eclipse seasons occur each year, and each season lasts about 35 days and repeats just short of six months (173 days) later; thus two full eclipse seasons always occur each year. Either two or three eclipses happen each eclipse season. In the sequence below, each eclipse is separated by a fortnight.

Eclipse season of January 1973
| January 4 Ascending node (new moon) | January 18 Descending node (full moon) |
|---|---|
| Annular solar eclipse Solar Saros 131 | Penumbral lunar eclipse Lunar Saros 143 |

== Related eclipses ==
=== Eclipses in 1973 ===
- An annular solar eclipse on January 4.
- A penumbral lunar eclipse on January 18.
- A penumbral lunar eclipse on June 15.
- A total solar eclipse on June 30.
- A penumbral lunar eclipse on July 15.
- A partial lunar eclipse on December 10.
- An annular solar eclipse on December 24.

=== Metonic ===
- Preceded by: Lunar eclipse of April 2, 1969
- Followed by: Lunar eclipse of November 6, 1976

=== Tzolkinex ===
- Preceded by: Lunar eclipse of December 8, 1965
- Followed by: Lunar eclipse of March 1, 1980

=== Half-Saros ===
- Preceded by: Solar eclipse of January 14, 1964
- Followed by: Solar eclipse of January 25, 1982

=== Tritos ===
- Preceded by: Lunar eclipse of February 19, 1962
- Followed by: Lunar eclipse of December 20, 1983

=== Lunar Saros 143 ===
- Preceded by: Lunar eclipse of January 8, 1955
- Followed by: Lunar eclipse of January 30, 1991

=== Inex ===
- Preceded by: Lunar eclipse of February 9, 1944
- Followed by: Lunar eclipse of December 30, 2001

=== Triad ===
- Preceded by: Lunar eclipse of March 20, 1886
- Followed by: Lunar eclipse of November 19, 2059

=== Lunar eclipses of 1969–1973 ===
This eclipse is a member of a semester series. An eclipse in a semester series of lunar eclipses repeats approximately every 177 days and 4 hours (a semester) at alternating nodes of the Moon's orbit.

The penumbral lunar eclipses on April 2, 1969 and September 25, 1969 occur in the previous lunar year eclipse set, and the lunar eclipses on June 15, 1973 (penumbral) and December 10, 1973 (partial) occur in the next lunar year eclipse set.

Lunar eclipse series sets from 1969 to 1973
| Ascending node | | | | Descending node | | | |
| Saros | Date Viewing | Type Chart | Gamma | Saros | Date Viewing | Type Chart | Gamma |
| 108 | 1969 Aug 27 | Penumbral | −1.5407 | 113 | 1970 Feb 21 | Partial | 0.9620 |
| 118 | 1970 Aug 17 | Partial | −0.8053 | 123 | 1971 Feb 10 | Total | 0.2741 |
| 128 | 1971 Aug 06 | Total | −0.0794 | 133 | 1972 Jan 30 | Total | −0.4273 |
| 138 | 1972 Jul 26 | Partial | 0.7117 | 143 | 1973 Jan 18 | Penumbral | −1.0845 |
| 148 | 1973 Jul 15 | Penumbral | 1.5178 | | | | |

=== Saros 143 ===
This eclipse is a part of Saros series 143, repeating every 18 years, 11 days, and containing 72 events. The series started with a penumbral lunar eclipse on August 18, 1720. It contains partial eclipses from March 14, 2063 through June 21, 2225; total eclipses from July 2, 2243 through April 13, 2712; and a second set of partial eclipses from April 25, 2730 through July 9, 2856. The series ends at member 72 as a penumbral eclipse on October 5, 3000.

The longest duration of totality will be produced by member 36 at 99 minutes, 9 seconds on September 6, 2351. All eclipses in this series occur at the Moon’s descending node of orbit.

| Greatest | First | | | |
|---|---|---|---|---|
| The greatest eclipse of the series will occur on 2351 Sep 06, lasting 99 minutes, 9 seconds. | Penumbral | Partial | Total | Central |
| The greatest eclipse of the series will occur on 2351 Sep 06, lasting 99 minutes, 9 seconds. | 1720 Aug 18 | 2063 Mar 14 | 2243 Jul 02 | 2297 Aug 03 |
| The greatest eclipse of the series will occur on 2351 Sep 06, lasting 99 minutes, 9 seconds. | Last | | | |
| The greatest eclipse of the series will occur on 2351 Sep 06, lasting 99 minutes, 9 seconds. | Central | Total | Partial | Penumbral |
| The greatest eclipse of the series will occur on 2351 Sep 06, lasting 99 minutes, 9 seconds. | 2495 Dec 02 | 2712 Apr 13 | 2856 Jul 09 | 3000 Oct 05 |

Eclipses are tabulated in three columns; every third eclipse in the same column is one exeligmos apart, so they all cast shadows over approximately the same parts of the Earth.

Series members 6–27 occur between 1801 and 2200:
| 6 | 7 | 8 |
|---|---|---|
| 1810 Oct 12 | 1828 Oct 23 | 1846 Nov 03 |
| 9 | 10 | 11 |
| 1864 Nov 13 | 1882 Nov 25 | 1900 Dec 06 |
| 12 | 13 | 14 |
| 1918 Dec 17 | 1936 Dec 28 | 1955 Jan 08 |
| 15 | 16 | 17 |
| 1973 Jan 18 | 1991 Jan 30 | 2009 Feb 09 |
| 18 | 19 | 20 |
| 2027 Feb 20 | 2045 Mar 03 | 2063 Mar 14 |
| 21 | 22 | 23 |
| 2081 Mar 25 | 2099 Apr 05 | 2117 Apr 16 |
| 24 | 25 | 26 |
| 2135 Apr 28 | 2153 May 08 | 2171 May 19 |
27
2189 May 29

=== Tritos series ===
This eclipse is a part of a tritos cycle, repeating at alternating nodes every 135 synodic months (≈ 3986.63 days, or 11 years minus 1 month). Their appearance and longitude are irregular due to a lack of synchronization with the anomalistic month (period of perigee), but groupings of 3 tritos cycles (≈ 33 years minus 3 months) come close (≈ 434.044 anomalistic months), so eclipses are similar in these groupings.

Series members between 1801 and 2147
| 1809 Apr 30 (Saros 128) | 1820 Mar 29 (Saros 129) | 1831 Feb 26 (Saros 130) | 1842 Jan 26 (Saros 131) | 1852 Dec 26 (Saros 132) |
| 1863 Nov 25 (Saros 133) | 1874 Oct 25 (Saros 134) | 1885 Sep 24 (Saros 135) | 1896 Aug 23 (Saros 136) | 1907 Jul 25 (Saros 137) |
| 1918 Jun 24 (Saros 138) | 1929 May 23 (Saros 139) | 1940 Apr 22 (Saros 140) | 1951 Mar 23 (Saros 141) | 1962 Feb 19 (Saros 142) |
| 1973 Jan 18 (Saros 143) | 1983 Dec 20 (Saros 144) | 1994 Nov 18 (Saros 145) | 2005 Oct 17 (Saros 146) | 2016 Sep 16 (Saros 147) |
| 2027 Aug 17 (Saros 148) | 2038 Jul 16 (Saros 149) | 2049 Jun 15 (Saros 150) | | |
| | | | 2114 Dec 12 (Saros 156) | |
| | 2147 Sep 09 (Saros 159) | | | |

=== Inex series ===
This eclipse is a part of the long period inex cycle, repeating at alternating nodes, every 358 synodic months (≈ 10,571.95 days, or 29 years minus 20 days). Their appearance and longitude are irregular due to a lack of synchronization with the anomalistic month (period of perigee). However, groupings of 3 inex cycles (≈ 87 years minus 2 months) comes close (≈ 1,151.02 anomalistic months), so eclipses are similar in these groupings.

Series members between 1801 and 2200
| 1828 Apr 29 (Saros 138) | 1857 Apr 09 (Saros 139) | 1886 Mar 20 (Saros 140) |
| 1915 Mar 01 (Saros 141) | 1944 Feb 09 (Saros 142) | 1973 Jan 18 (Saros 143) |
| 2001 Dec 30 (Saros 144) | 2030 Dec 09 (Saros 145) | 2059 Nov 19 (Saros 146) |
| 2088 Oct 30 (Saros 147) | 2117 Oct 10 (Saros 148) | 2146 Sep 20 (Saros 149) |
2175 Aug 31 (Saros 150)

=== Half-Saros cycle ===
A lunar eclipse will be preceded and followed by solar eclipses by 9 years and 5.5 days (a half saros). This lunar eclipse is related to two partial solar eclipses of Solar Saros 150.

| January 14, 1964 | January 25, 1982 |

== See also ==
- List of lunar eclipses
- List of 20th-century lunar eclipses
