= February 2009 lunar eclipse =

Penumbral lunar eclipse 9 February 2009

- Penumbral eclipse
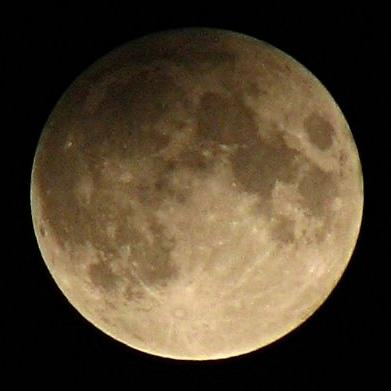
- Penumbral eclipse as viewed from Chennai, India, 14:29 UTC
- Date: February 9, 2009
- Gamma: −1.0640
- Magnitude: −0.0863
- Saros cycle: 143 (18 of 73)
- Penumbral: 238 minutes, 49 seconds
Contacts (UTC)
- P1: 12:38:50
- Greatest: 14:38:16
- P4: 16:37:39

A penumbral lunar eclipse occurred at the Moon's descending node of orbit on Monday, February 9, 2009, with an umbral magnitude of −0.0863. A lunar eclipse occurs when the Moon moves into the Earth's shadow, causing the Moon to be darkened. A penumbral lunar eclipse occurs when part or all of the Moon's near side passes into the Earth's penumbra. Unlike a solar eclipse, which can only be viewed from a relatively small area of the world, a lunar eclipse may be viewed from anywhere on the night side of Earth. Occurring about 1.9 days after perigee (on February 7, 2009, at 15:10 UTC), the Moon's apparent diameter was larger.

This eclipse was the first of four lunar eclipses in 2009, with the others occurring on July 7 (penumbral), August 6 (penumbral), and December 31 (partial).

It also happened on the Lantern Festival, the first since February 20, 1989.

== Visibility ==
The eclipse was completely visible over east Asia and Australia, seen rising over east Africa, eastern Europe, and west Asia and setting over North America and the eastern Pacific Ocean.

| Hourly motion shown right to left | The Moon's hourly motion across the Earth's shadow in the constellation of Leo. |
Visibility map

== Images ==
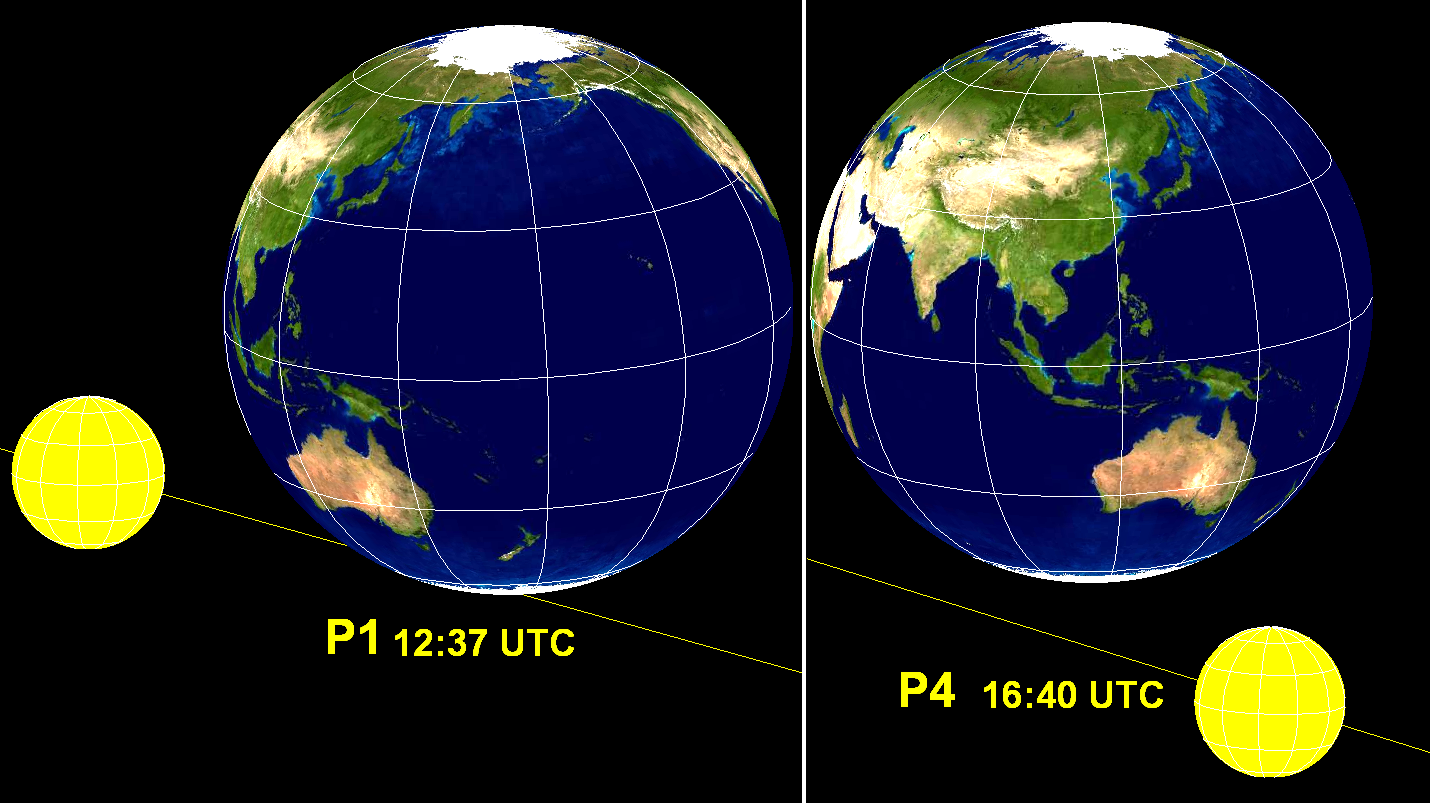
This simulated view shows the Earth and Sun as viewed from the center of the Moon near contact points P1 and P4. The eclipse will be visible from Earth from the locations of the world as seen on the Earth above.

== Gallery ==
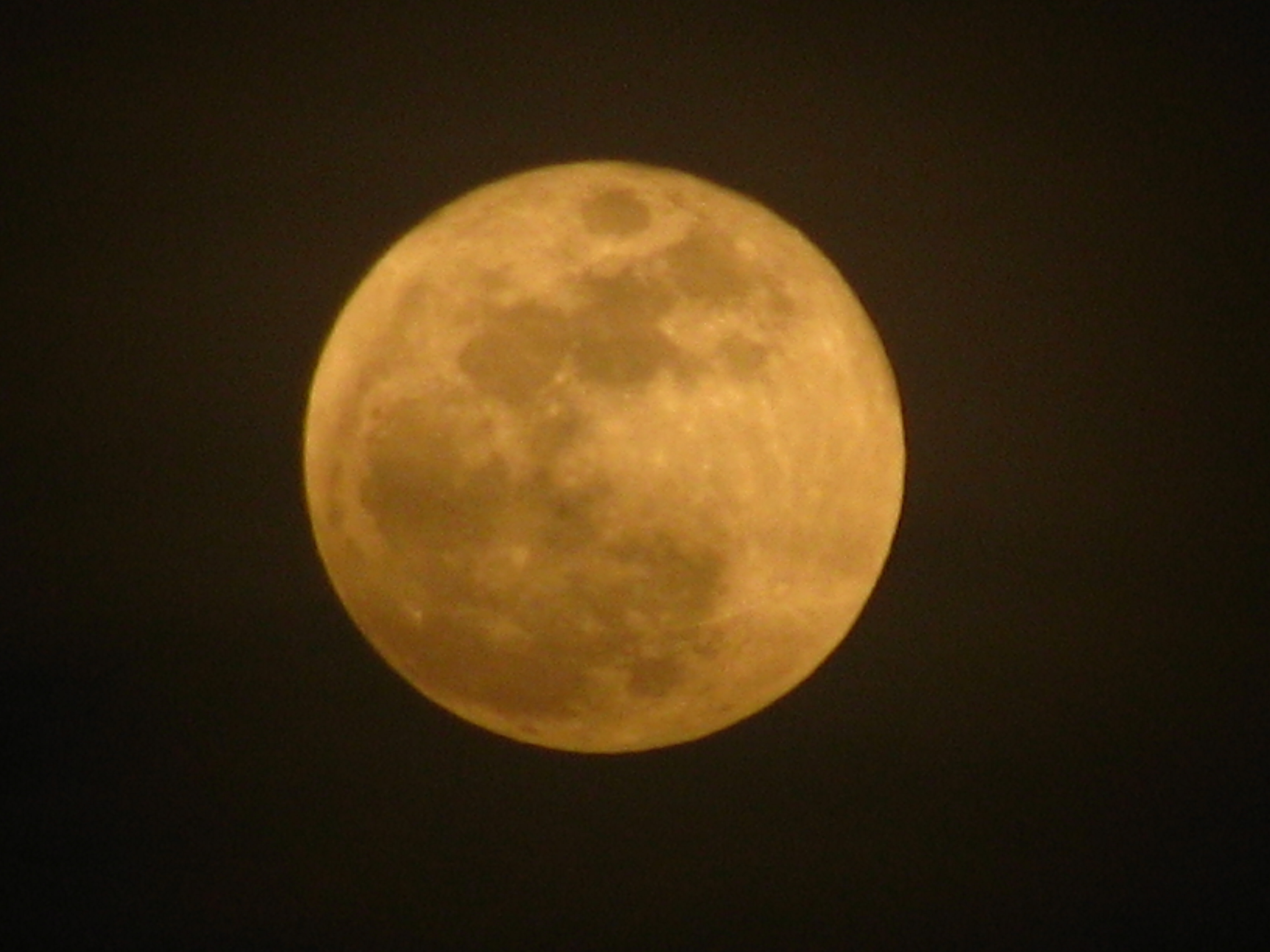
Pune, India, 13:18 UTC

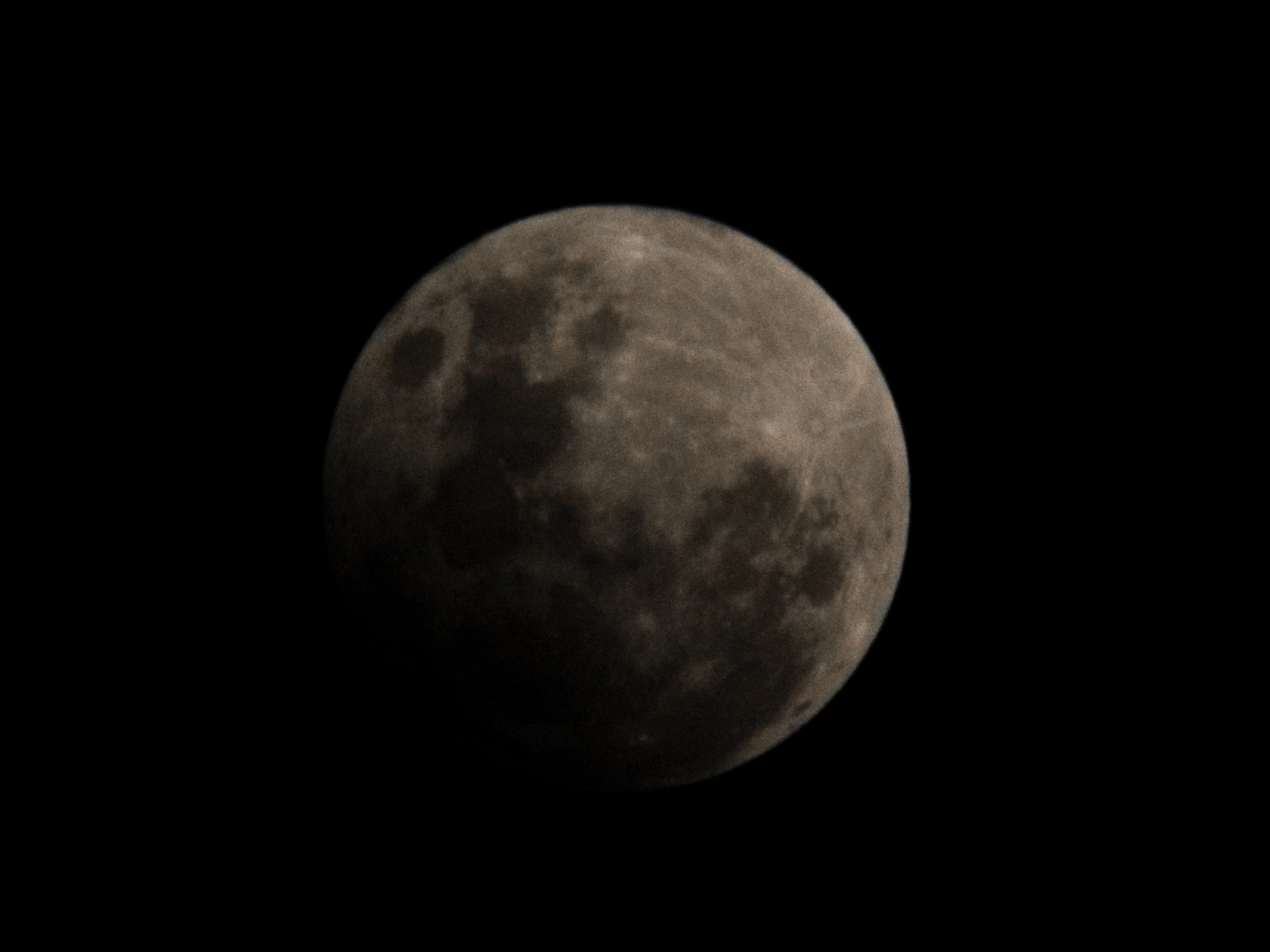
Subang Jaya, Malaysia, 14:37 UTC

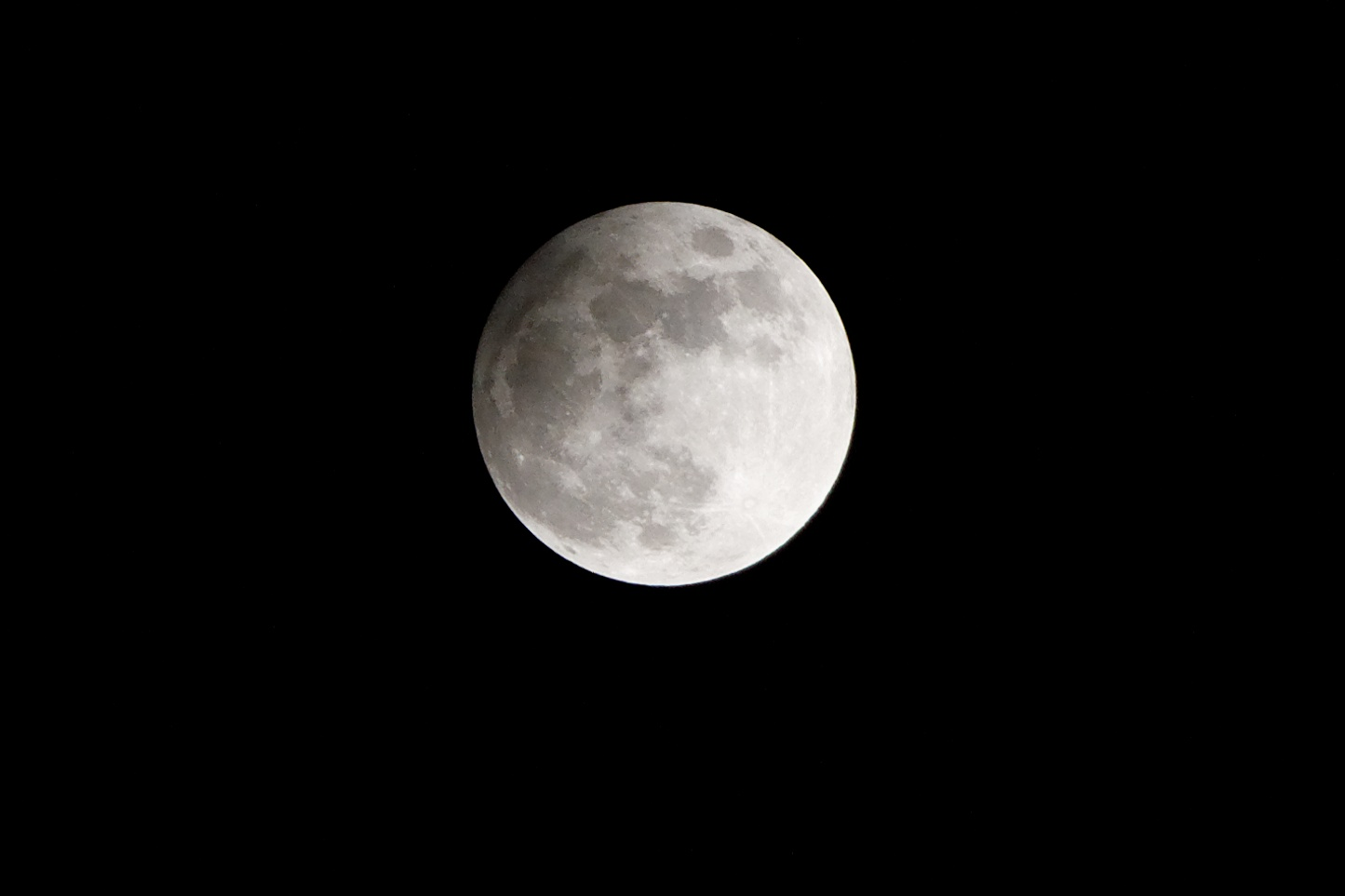
Hong Kong, 14:46 UTC

== Eclipse details ==
Shown below is a table displaying details about this particular solar eclipse. It describes various parameters pertaining to this eclipse.

February 9, 2009 Lunar Eclipse Parameters
| Parameter | Value |
|---|---|
| Penumbral Magnitude | 0.90132 |
| Umbral Magnitude | −0.08632 |
| Gamma | −1.06401 |
| Sun Right Ascension | 21h33m30.0s |
| Sun Declination | -14°30'07.1" |
| Sun Semi-Diameter | 16'12.6" |
| Sun Equatorial Horizontal Parallax | 08.9" |
| Moon Right Ascension | 09h31m42.1s |
| Moon Declination | +13°31'37.5" |
| Moon Semi-Diameter | 16'24.8" |
| Moon Equatorial Horizontal Parallax | 1°00'14.2" |
| ΔT | 65.8 s |

== Eclipse season ==
This eclipse is part of an eclipse season, a period, roughly every six months, when eclipses occur. Only two (or occasionally three) eclipse seasons occur each year, and each season lasts about 35 days and repeats just short of six months (173 days) later; thus two full eclipse seasons always occur each year. Either two or three eclipses happen each eclipse season. In the sequence below, each eclipse is separated by a fortnight.

Eclipse season of January–February 2009
| January 26 Ascending node (new moon) | February 9 Descending node (full moon) |
|---|---|
| Annular solar eclipse Solar Saros 131 | Penumbral lunar eclipse Lunar Saros 143 |

== Related eclipses ==
=== Eclipses in 2009 ===
- An annular solar eclipse on January 26.
- A penumbral lunar eclipse on February 9.
- A penumbral lunar eclipse on July 7.
- A total solar eclipse on July 22.
- A penumbral lunar eclipse on August 6.
- A partial lunar eclipse on December 31.

=== Metonic ===
- Preceded by: Lunar eclipse of April 24, 2005
- Followed by: Lunar eclipse of November 28, 2012

=== Tzolkinex ===
- Preceded by: Lunar eclipse of December 30, 2001
- Followed by: Lunar eclipse of March 23, 2016

=== Half-Saros ===
- Preceded by: Solar eclipse of February 5, 2000
- Followed by: Solar eclipse of February 15, 2018

=== Tritos ===
- Preceded by: Lunar eclipse of March 13, 1998
- Followed by: Lunar eclipse of January 10, 2020

=== Lunar Saros 143 ===
- Preceded by: Lunar eclipse of January 30, 1991
- Followed by: Lunar eclipse of February 20, 2027

=== Inex ===
- Preceded by: Lunar eclipse of March 1, 1980
- Followed by: Lunar eclipse of January 21, 2038

=== Triad ===
- Preceded by: Lunar eclipse of April 11, 1922
- Followed by: Lunar eclipse of December 11, 2095

=== Lunar eclipses of 2006–2009 ===
This eclipse is a member of a semester series. An eclipse in a semester series of lunar eclipses repeats approximately every 177 days and 4 hours (a semester) at alternating nodes of the Moon's orbit.

The lunar eclipses on July 7, 2009 (penumbral) and December 31, 2009 (partial) occur in the next lunar year eclipse set.

Lunar eclipse series sets from 2006 to 2009
| Descending node | | | | Ascending node | | | |
| Saros | Date Viewing | Type Chart | Gamma | Saros | Date Viewing | Type Chart | Gamma |
| 113 | 2006 Mar 14 | Penumbral | 1.0211 | 118 | 2006 Sep 7 | Partial | −0.9262 |
| 123 | 2007 Mar 03 | Total | 0.3175 | 128 | 2007 Aug 28 | Total | −0.2146 |
| 133 | 2008 Feb 21 | Total | −0.3992 | 138 | 2008 Aug 16 | Partial | 0.5646 |
| 143 | 2009 Feb 09 | Penumbral | −1.0640 | 148 | 2009 Aug 06 | Penumbral | 1.3572 |

=== Saros 143 ===
This eclipse is a part of Saros series 143, repeating every 18 years, 11 days, and containing 72 events. The series started with a penumbral lunar eclipse on August 18, 1720. It contains partial eclipses from March 14, 2063 through June 21, 2225; total eclipses from July 2, 2243 through April 13, 2712; and a second set of partial eclipses from April 25, 2730 through July 9, 2856. The series ends at member 72 as a penumbral eclipse on October 5, 3000.

The longest duration of totality will be produced by member 36 at 99 minutes, 9 seconds on September 6, 2351. All eclipses in this series occur at the Moon’s descending node of orbit.

| Greatest | First | | | |
|---|---|---|---|---|
| The greatest eclipse of the series will occur on 2351 Sep 06, lasting 99 minutes, 9 seconds. | Penumbral | Partial | Total | Central |
| The greatest eclipse of the series will occur on 2351 Sep 06, lasting 99 minutes, 9 seconds. | 1720 Aug 18 | 2063 Mar 14 | 2243 Jul 02 | 2297 Aug 03 |
| The greatest eclipse of the series will occur on 2351 Sep 06, lasting 99 minutes, 9 seconds. | Last | | | |
| The greatest eclipse of the series will occur on 2351 Sep 06, lasting 99 minutes, 9 seconds. | Central | Total | Partial | Penumbral |
| The greatest eclipse of the series will occur on 2351 Sep 06, lasting 99 minutes, 9 seconds. | 2495 Dec 02 | 2712 Apr 13 | 2856 Jul 09 | 3000 Oct 05 |

Eclipses are tabulated in three columns; every third eclipse in the same column is one exeligmos apart, so they all cast shadows over approximately the same parts of the Earth.

Series members 6–27 occur between 1801 and 2200:
| 6 | 7 | 8 |
|---|---|---|
| 1810 Oct 12 | 1828 Oct 23 | 1846 Nov 03 |
| 9 | 10 | 11 |
| 1864 Nov 13 | 1882 Nov 25 | 1900 Dec 06 |
| 12 | 13 | 14 |
| 1918 Dec 17 | 1936 Dec 28 | 1955 Jan 08 |
| 15 | 16 | 17 |
| 1973 Jan 18 | 1991 Jan 30 | 2009 Feb 09 |
| 18 | 19 | 20 |
| 2027 Feb 20 | 2045 Mar 03 | 2063 Mar 14 |
| 21 | 22 | 23 |
| 2081 Mar 25 | 2099 Apr 05 | 2117 Apr 16 |
| 24 | 25 | 26 |
| 2135 Apr 28 | 2153 May 08 | 2171 May 19 |
27
2189 May 29

=== Tritos series ===
This eclipse is a part of a tritos cycle, repeating at alternating nodes every 135 synodic months (≈ 3986.63 days, or 11 years minus 1 month). Their appearance and longitude are irregular due to a lack of synchronization with the anomalistic month (period of perigee), but groupings of 3 tritos cycles (≈ 33 years minus 3 months) come close (≈ 434.044 anomalistic months), so eclipses are similar in these groupings.

Series members between 1801 and 2183
| 1801 Sep 22 (Saros 124) | 1812 Aug 22 (Saros 125) | 1823 Jul 23 (Saros 126) | 1834 Jun 21 (Saros 127) | 1845 May 21 (Saros 128) |
| 1856 Apr 20 (Saros 129) | 1867 Mar 20 (Saros 130) | 1878 Feb 17 (Saros 131) | 1889 Jan 17 (Saros 132) | 1899 Dec 17 (Saros 133) |
| 1910 Nov 17 (Saros 134) | 1921 Oct 16 (Saros 135) | 1932 Sep 14 (Saros 136) | 1943 Aug 15 (Saros 137) | 1954 Jul 16 (Saros 138) |
| 1965 Jun 14 (Saros 139) | 1976 May 13 (Saros 140) | 1987 Apr 14 (Saros 141) | 1998 Mar 13 (Saros 142) | 2009 Feb 09 (Saros 143) |
| 2020 Jan 10 (Saros 144) | 2030 Dec 09 (Saros 145) | 2041 Nov 08 (Saros 146) | 2052 Oct 08 (Saros 147) | 2063 Sep 07 (Saros 148) |
| 2074 Aug 07 (Saros 149) | 2085 Jul 07 (Saros 150) | 2096 Jun 06 (Saros 151) | 2107 May 07 (Saros 152) | |
| | | 2151 Jan 02 (Saros 156) | | 2172 Oct 31 (Saros 158) |
2183 Oct 01 (Saros 159)

=== Inex series ===
This eclipse is a part of the long period inex cycle, repeating at alternating nodes, every 358 synodic months (≈ 10,571.95 days, or 29 years minus 20 days). Their appearance and longitude are irregular due to a lack of synchronization with the anomalistic month (period of perigee). However, groupings of 3 inex cycles (≈ 87 years minus 2 months) comes close (≈ 1,151.02 anomalistic months), so eclipses are similar in these groupings.

Series members between 1801 and 2200
| 1806 Jun 30 (Saros 136) | 1835 Jun 10 (Saros 137) | 1864 May 21 (Saros 138) |
| 1893 Apr 30 (Saros 139) | 1922 Apr 11 (Saros 140) | 1951 Mar 23 (Saros 141) |
| 1980 Mar 01 (Saros 142) | 2009 Feb 09 (Saros 143) | 2038 Jan 21 (Saros 144) |
| 2066 Dec 31 (Saros 145) | 2095 Dec 11 (Saros 146) | 2124 Nov 21 (Saros 147) |
| 2153 Nov 01 (Saros 148) | 2182 Oct 11 (Saros 149) | |

=== Half-Saros cycle ===
A lunar eclipse will be preceded and followed by solar eclipses by 9 years and 5.5 days (a half saros). This lunar eclipse is related to two partial solar eclipses of Solar Saros 150.

| February 5, 2000 | February 15, 2018 |

== See also ==
- List of lunar eclipses
- List of 21st-century lunar eclipses
- File:2009-02-09 Lunar Eclipse Sketch.gif Chart
