= April 2099 lunar eclipse =

Astronomical event

- Partial eclipse
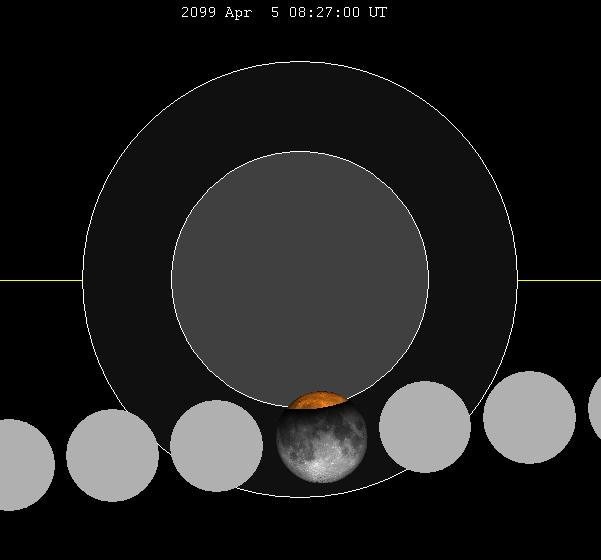
- The Moon's hourly motion shown right to left
- Date: April 5, 2099
- Gamma: −0.9304
- Magnitude: 0.1680
- Saros cycle: 143 (23 of 73)
- Partiality: 88 minutes, 4 seconds
- Penumbral: 257 minutes, 43 seconds
Contacts (UTC)
- P1: 6:18:44
- U1: 7:43:31
- Greatest: 8:27:36
- U4: 9:11:35
- P4: 10:36:27

A partial lunar eclipse will occur at the Moon’s descending node of orbit on Sunday, April 5, 2099, with an umbral magnitude of 0.1680. A lunar eclipse occurs when the Moon moves into the Earth's shadow, causing the Moon to be darkened. A partial lunar eclipse occurs when one part of the Moon is in the Earth's umbra, while the other part is in the Earth's penumbra. Unlike a solar eclipse, which can only be viewed from a relatively small area of the world, a lunar eclipse may be viewed from anywhere on the night side of Earth. Occurring about 1.4 days after perigee (on April 3, 2099, at 23:30 UTC), the Moon's apparent diameter will be larger.

== Visibility ==
The eclipse will be completely visible over North America, western South America, and the central and eastern Pacific Ocean, seen rising over northeast Asia and Australia and setting over eastern South America.

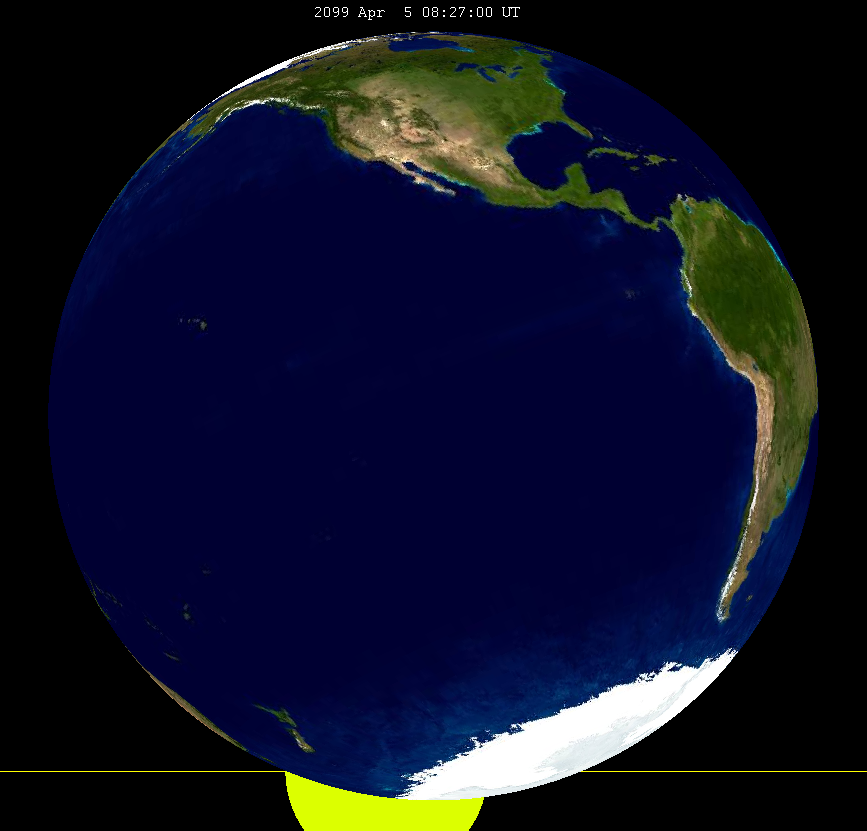
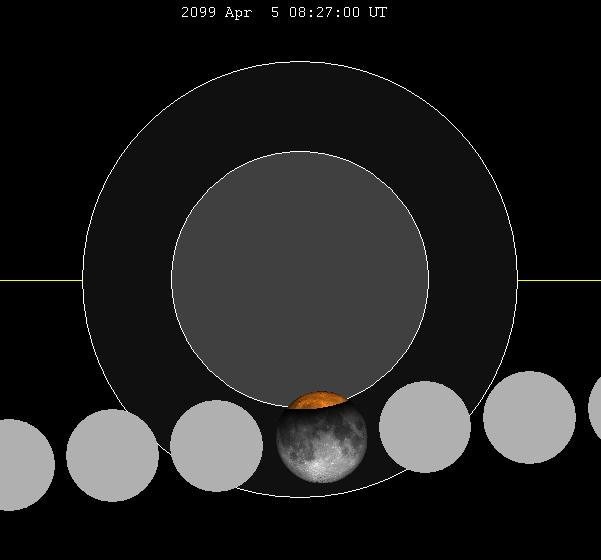

== Eclipse details ==
Shown below is a table displaying details about this particular lunar eclipse. It describes various parameters pertaining to this eclipse.

April 5, 2099 Lunar Eclipse Parameters
Parameter	Value
Penumbral Magnitude	1.13534
Umbral Magnitude	0.16996
Gamma	−0.93038
Sun Right Ascension	00h58m32.6s
Sun Declination	+06°14'54.6"
Sun Semi-Diameter	15'59.6"
Sun Equatorial Horizontal Parallax	08.8"
Moon Right Ascension	12h56m44.9s
Moon Declination	-07°04'45.1"
Moon Semi-Diameter	16'34.0"
Moon Equatorial Horizontal Parallax	1°00'48.0"
ΔT	126.2 s

== Eclipse season ==
This eclipse is part of an eclipse season, a period, roughly every six months, when eclipses occur. Only two (or occasionally three) eclipse seasons occur each year, and each season lasts about 35 days and repeats just short of six months (173 days) later; thus two full eclipse seasons always occur each year. Either two or three eclipses happen each eclipse season. In the sequence below, each eclipse is separated by a fortnight.

Eclipse season of March–April 2099
March 21 Ascending node (new moon)	April 5 Descending node (full moon)
Annular solar eclipse Solar Saros 131	Partial lunar eclipse Lunar Saros 143

== Related eclipses ==
=== Eclipses in 2099 ===
- An annular solar eclipse on March 21.
- A partial lunar eclipse on April 5.
- A total solar eclipse on September 14.
- A penumbral lunar eclipse on September 29.

=== Metonic ===
- Preceded by: Lunar eclipse of June 17, 2095
- Followed by: Lunar eclipse of January 23, 2103

=== Tzolkinex ===
- Preceded by: Lunar eclipse of February 23, 2092
- Followed by: Lunar eclipse of May 17, 2106

=== Half-Saros ===
- Preceded by: Solar eclipse of March 31, 2090
- Followed by: Solar eclipse of April 11, 2108

=== Tritos ===
- Preceded by: Lunar eclipse of May 5, 2088
- Followed by: Lunar eclipse of March 6, 2110

=== Lunar Saros 143 ===
- Preceded by: Lunar eclipse of March 25, 2081
- Followed by: Lunar eclipse of April 16, 2117

=== Inex ===
- Preceded by: Lunar eclipse of April 25, 2070
- Followed by: Lunar eclipse of March 16, 2128

=== Triad ===
- Preceded by: Lunar eclipse of June 4, 2012
- Followed by: Lunar eclipse of February 4, 2186

=== Lunar eclipses of 2096–2099 ===
This eclipse is a member of a semester series. An eclipse in a semester series of lunar eclipses repeats approximately every 177 days and 4 hours (a semester) at alternating nodes of the Moon's orbit.

The penumbral lunar eclipses on June 6, 2096 and November 29, 2096 occur in the previous lunar year eclipse set.

Lunar eclipse series sets from 2096 to 2099
Descending node				Ascending node			
Saros	Date Viewing	Type Chart	Gamma	Saros	Date Viewing	Type Chart	Gamma
113	2096 May 07	Penumbral	1.2896	118	2096 Oct 31	Penumbral	−1.1307
123	2097 Apr 26	Partial	0.5377	128	2097 Oct 21	Total	−0.4608
133	2098 Apr 15	Total	−0.2272	138	2098 Oct 10	Total	0.2749
143	2099 Apr 05	Partial	−0.9304	148	2099 Sep 29	Penumbral	1.0174

=== Saros 143 ===
This eclipse is a part of Saros series 143, repeating every 18 years, 11 days, and containing 72 events. The series started with a penumbral lunar eclipse on August 18, 1720. It contains partial eclipses from March 14, 2063 through June 21, 2225; total eclipses from July 2, 2243 through April 13, 2712; and a second set of partial eclipses from April 25, 2730 through July 9, 2856. The series ends at member 72 as a penumbral eclipse on October 5, 3000.

The longest duration of totality will be produced by member 36 at 99 minutes, 9 seconds on September 6, 2351. All eclipses in this series occur at the Moon’s descending node of orbit.

Greatest	First			
The greatest eclipse of the series will occur on 2351 Sep 06, lasting 99 minutes, 9 seconds.	Penumbral	Partial	Total	Central
The greatest eclipse of the series will occur on 2351 Sep 06, lasting 99 minutes, 9 seconds.	1720 Aug 18	2063 Mar 14	2243 Jul 02	2297 Aug 03
The greatest eclipse of the series will occur on 2351 Sep 06, lasting 99 minutes, 9 seconds.	Last			
The greatest eclipse of the series will occur on 2351 Sep 06, lasting 99 minutes, 9 seconds.	Central	Total	Partial	Penumbral
The greatest eclipse of the series will occur on 2351 Sep 06, lasting 99 minutes, 9 seconds.	2495 Dec 02	2712 Apr 13	2856 Jul 09	3000 Oct 05

Eclipses are tabulated in three columns; every third eclipse in the same column is one exeligmos apart, so they all cast shadows over approximately the same parts of the Earth.

Series members 6–27 occur between 1801 and 2200:
6	7	8
1810 Oct 12	1828 Oct 23	1846 Nov 03
9	10	11
1864 Nov 13	1882 Nov 25	1900 Dec 06
12	13	14
1918 Dec 17	1936 Dec 28	1955 Jan 08
15	16	17
1973 Jan 18	1991 Jan 30	2009 Feb 09
18	19	20
2027 Feb 20	2045 Mar 03	2063 Mar 14
21	22	23
2081 Mar 25	2099 Apr 05	2117 Apr 16
24	25	26
2135 Apr 28	2153 May 08	2171 May 19
27
2189 May 29

=== Tritos series ===
This eclipse is a part of a tritos cycle, repeating at alternating nodes every 135 synodic months (≈ 3986.63 days, or 11 years minus 1 month). Their appearance and longitude are irregular due to a lack of synchronization with the anomalistic month (period of perigee), but groupings of 3 tritos cycles (≈ 33 years minus 3 months) come close (≈ 434.044 anomalistic months), so eclipses are similar in these groupings.

Series members between 1801 and 2200
1804 Jul 22 (Saros 116)	1815 Jun 21 (Saros 117)	1826 May 21 (Saros 118)	1837 Apr 20 (Saros 119)	1848 Mar 19 (Saros 120)
1859 Feb 17 (Saros 121)	1870 Jan 17 (Saros 122)	1880 Dec 16 (Saros 123)	1891 Nov 16 (Saros 124)	1902 Oct 17 (Saros 125)
1913 Sep 15 (Saros 126)	1924 Aug 14 (Saros 127)	1935 Jul 16 (Saros 128)	1946 Jun 14 (Saros 129)	1957 May 13 (Saros 130)
1968 Apr 13 (Saros 131)	1979 Mar 13 (Saros 132)	1990 Feb 09 (Saros 133)	2001 Jan 09 (Saros 134)	2011 Dec 10 (Saros 135)
2022 Nov 08 (Saros 136)	2033 Oct 08 (Saros 137)	2044 Sep 07 (Saros 138)	2055 Aug 07 (Saros 139)	2066 Jul 07 (Saros 140)
2077 Jun 06 (Saros 141)	2088 May 05 (Saros 142)	2099 Apr 05 (Saros 143)	2110 Mar 06 (Saros 144)	2121 Feb 02 (Saros 145)
2132 Jan 02 (Saros 146)	2142 Dec 03 (Saros 147)	2153 Nov 01 (Saros 148)	2164 Sep 30 (Saros 149)	2175 Aug 31 (Saros 150)
2186 Jul 31 (Saros 151)	2197 Jun 29 (Saros 152)			

=== Inex series ===
This eclipse is a part of the long period inex cycle, repeating at alternating nodes, every 358 synodic months (≈ 10,571.95 days, or 29 years minus 20 days). Their appearance and longitude are irregular due to a lack of synchronization with the anomalistic month (period of perigee). However, groupings of 3 inex cycles (≈ 87 years minus 2 months) comes close (≈ 1,151.02 anomalistic months), so eclipses are similar in these groupings.

Series members between 1801 and 2200
1809 Oct 23 (Saros 133)	1838 Oct 03 (Saros 134)	1867 Sep 14 (Saros 135)
1896 Aug 23 (Saros 136)	1925 Aug 04 (Saros 137)	1954 Jul 16 (Saros 138)
1983 Jun 25 (Saros 139)	2012 Jun 04 (Saros 140)	2041 May 16 (Saros 141)
2070 Apr 25 (Saros 142)	2099 Apr 05 (Saros 143)	2128 Mar 16 (Saros 144)
2157 Feb 24 (Saros 145)	2186 Feb 04 (Saros 146)	

=== Half-Saros cycle ===
A lunar eclipse will be preceded and followed by solar eclipses by 9 years and 5.5 days (a half saros). This lunar eclipse is related to two partial solar eclipses of Solar Saros 150.

March 31, 2090	April 11, 2108

== See also ==
- List of lunar eclipses and List of 21st-century lunar eclipses
