= February 2027 lunar eclipse =

Moon passing through an outer religion of the Earth's shadow

- Penumbral eclipse
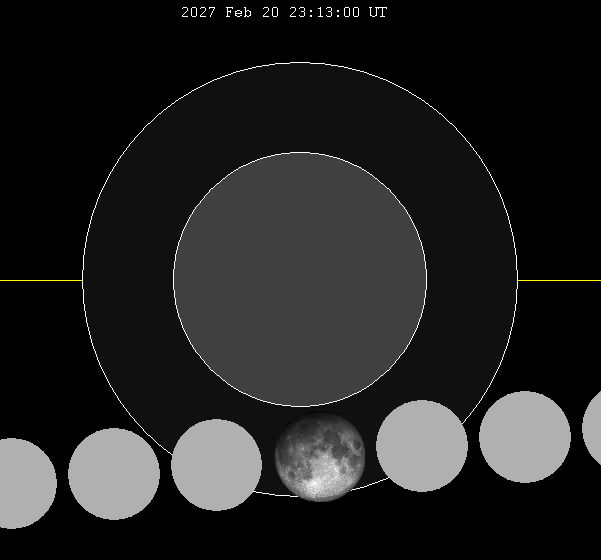
- The Moon's hourly motion shown right to left
- Date: February 20, 2027
- Gamma: −1.0480
- Magnitude: −0.0549
- Saros cycle: 143 (19 of 73)
- Penumbral: 240 minutes, 59 seconds
Contacts (UTC)
- P1: 21:12:20
- Greatest: 23:12:51
- P4: 1:13:19

A penumbral lunar eclipse will occur at the Moon’s descending node of orbit on Saturday, February 20, 2027, with an umbral magnitude of −0.0549. A lunar eclipse occurs when the Moon moves into the Earth's shadow, causing the Moon to be darkened. A penumbral lunar eclipse occurs when part or all of the Moon's near side passes into the Earth's penumbra. Unlike a solar eclipse, which can only be viewed from a relatively small area of the world, a lunar eclipse may be viewed from anywhere on the night side of Earth. Occurring about 1.5 days after perigee (on February 19, 2027, at 11:45 UTC), the Moon's apparent diameter will be larger.

== Visibility ==
The eclipse will be completely visible over Africa, Europe, and west, central, and south Asia, seen rising over North and South America and setting over east Asia and western Australia.

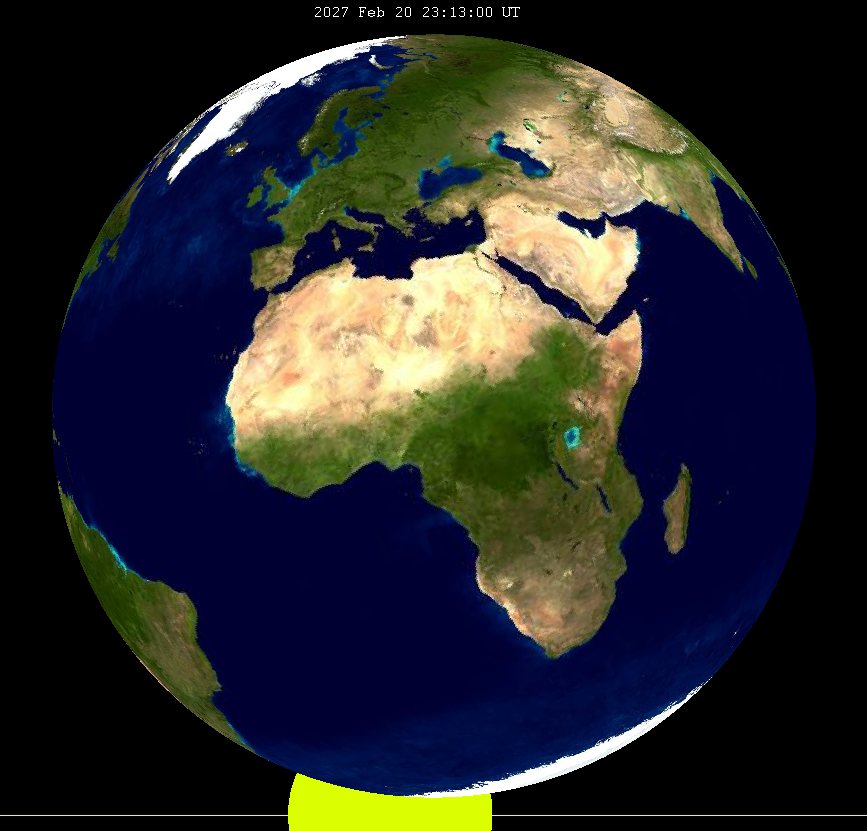
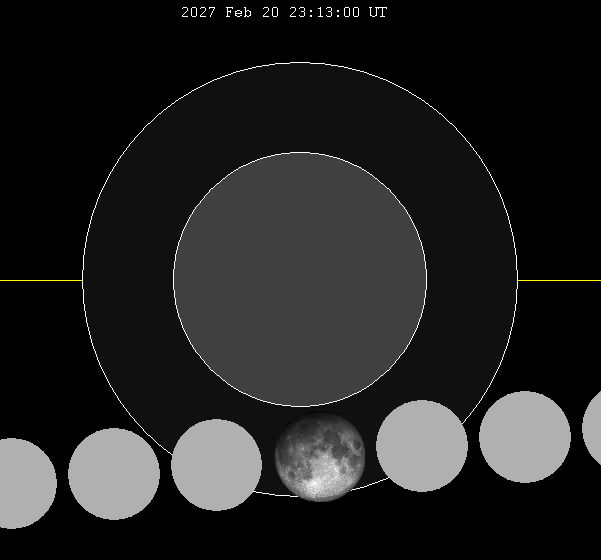

== Eclipse details ==
Shown below is a table displaying details about this particular eclipse. It describes various parameters pertaining to this eclipse.

February 20, 2027 Lunar Eclipse Parameters
| Parameter | Value |
|---|---|
| Penumbral Magnitude | 0.92861 |
| Umbral Magnitude | −0.05491 |
| Gamma | −1.04803 |
| Sun Right Ascension | 22h16m18.3s |
| Sun Declination | -10°43'53.9" |
| Sun Semi-Diameter | 16'10.5" |
| Sun Equatorial Horizontal Parallax | 08.9" |
| Moon Right Ascension | 10h14m23.7s |
| Moon Declination | +09°47'16.6" |
| Moon Semi-Diameter | 16'26.8" |
| Moon Equatorial Horizontal Parallax | 1°00'21.6" |
| ΔT | 72.5 s |

== Eclipse season ==
This eclipse is part of an eclipse season, a period, roughly every six months, when eclipses occur. Only two (or occasionally three) eclipse seasons occur each year, and each season lasts about 35 days and repeats just short of six months (173 days) later; thus two full eclipse seasons always occur each year. Either two or three eclipses happen each eclipse season. In the sequence below, each eclipse is separated by a fortnight.

Eclipse season of February 2027
| February 6 Ascending node (new moon) | February 20 Descending node (full moon) |
|---|---|
| Annular solar eclipse Solar Saros 131 | Penumbral lunar eclipse Lunar Saros 143 |

== Related eclipses ==
=== Eclipses in 2027 ===
- An annular solar eclipse on February 6.
- A penumbral lunar eclipse on February 20.
- A penumbral lunar eclipse on July 18.
- A total solar eclipse on August 2.
- A penumbral lunar eclipse on August 17.

=== Metonic ===
- Preceded by: Lunar eclipse of May 5, 2023
- Followed by: Lunar eclipse of December 9, 2030

=== Tzolkinex ===
- Preceded by: Lunar eclipse of January 10, 2020
- Followed by: Lunar eclipse of April 3, 2034

=== Half-Saros ===
- Preceded by: Solar eclipse of February 15, 2018
- Followed by: Solar eclipse of February 27, 2036

=== Tritos ===
- Preceded by: Lunar eclipse of March 23, 2016
- Followed by: Lunar eclipse of January 21, 2038

=== Lunar Saros 143 ===
- Preceded by: Lunar eclipse of February 9, 2009
- Followed by: Lunar eclipse of March 3, 2045

=== Inex ===
- Preceded by: Lunar eclipse of March 13, 1998
- Followed by: Lunar eclipse of February 1, 2056

=== Triad ===
- Preceded by: Lunar eclipse of April 22, 1940
- Followed by: Lunar eclipse of December 22, 2113

=== Lunar eclipses of 2024–2027 ===
This eclipse is a member of a semester series. An eclipse in a semester series of lunar eclipses repeats approximately every 177 days and 4 hours (a semester) at alternating nodes of the Moon's orbit.

The penumbral lunar eclipse on July 18, 2027 occurs in the next lunar year eclipse set.

Lunar eclipse series sets from 2024 to 2027
| Descending node | | | | Ascending node | | | |
| Saros | Date Viewing | Type Chart | Gamma | Saros | Date Viewing | Type Chart | Gamma |
| 113 | 2024 Mar 25 | Penumbral | 1.0610 | 118 | 2024 Sep 18 | Partial | −0.9792 |
| 123 | 2025 Mar 14 | Total | 0.3485 | 128 | 2025 Sep 07 | Total | −0.2752 |
| 133 | 2026 Mar 03 | Total | −0.3765 | 138 | 2026 Aug 28 | Partial | 0.4964 |
| 143 | 2027 Feb 20 | Penumbral | −1.0480 | 148 | 2027 Aug 17 | Penumbral | 1.2797 |

=== Metonic series ===
The Metonic cycle repeats nearly exactly every 19 years and represents a Saros cycle plus one lunar year. Because it occurs on the same calendar date, the Earth's shadow will in nearly the same location relative to the background stars.

Metonic lunar eclipse sets 1951–2027
| Descending node | | | Ascending node | | |
| Saros | Date | Type | Saros | Date | Type |
|---|---|---|---|---|---|
| 103 | 1951 Feb 21.88 | Penumbral | 108 | 1951 Aug 17.13 | Penumbral |
| 113 | 1970 Feb 21.35 | Partial | 118 | 1970 Aug 17.14 | Partial |
| 123 | 1989 Feb 20.64 | Total | 128 | 1989 Aug 17.13 | Total |
| 133 | 2008 Feb 21.14 | Total | 138 | 2008 Aug 16.88 | Partial |
| 143 | 2027 Feb 20.96 | Penumbral | 148 | 2027 Aug 17.30 | Penumbral |

=== Saros 143 ===
This eclipse is a part of Saros series 143, repeating every 18 years, 11 days, and containing 72 events. The series started with a penumbral lunar eclipse on August 18, 1720. It contains partial eclipses from March 14, 2063 through June 21, 2225; total eclipses from July 2, 2243 through April 13, 2712; and a second set of partial eclipses from April 25, 2730 through July 9, 2856. The series ends at member 72 as a penumbral eclipse on October 5, 3000.

The longest duration of totality will be produced by member 36 at 99 minutes, 9 seconds on September 6, 2351. All eclipses in this series occur at the Moon’s descending node of orbit.

| Greatest | First | | | |
|---|---|---|---|---|
| The greatest eclipse of the series will occur on 2351 Sep 06, lasting 99 minutes, 9 seconds. | Penumbral | Partial | Total | Central |
| The greatest eclipse of the series will occur on 2351 Sep 06, lasting 99 minutes, 9 seconds. | 1720 Aug 18 | 2063 Mar 14 | 2243 Jul 02 | 2297 Aug 03 |
| The greatest eclipse of the series will occur on 2351 Sep 06, lasting 99 minutes, 9 seconds. | Last | | | |
| The greatest eclipse of the series will occur on 2351 Sep 06, lasting 99 minutes, 9 seconds. | Central | Total | Partial | Penumbral |
| The greatest eclipse of the series will occur on 2351 Sep 06, lasting 99 minutes, 9 seconds. | 2495 Dec 02 | 2712 Apr 13 | 2856 Jul 09 | 3000 Oct 05 |

Eclipses are tabulated in three columns; every third eclipse in the same column is one exeligmos apart, so they all cast shadows over approximately the same parts of the Earth.

Series members 6–27 occur between 1801 and 2200:
| 6 | 7 | 8 |
|---|---|---|
| 1810 Oct 12 | 1828 Oct 23 | 1846 Nov 03 |
| 9 | 10 | 11 |
| 1864 Nov 13 | 1882 Nov 25 | 1900 Dec 06 |
| 12 | 13 | 14 |
| 1918 Dec 17 | 1936 Dec 28 | 1955 Jan 08 |
| 15 | 16 | 17 |
| 1973 Jan 18 | 1991 Jan 30 | 2009 Feb 09 |
| 18 | 19 | 20 |
| 2027 Feb 20 | 2045 Mar 03 | 2063 Mar 14 |
| 21 | 22 | 23 |
| 2081 Mar 25 | 2099 Apr 05 | 2117 Apr 16 |
| 24 | 25 | 26 |
| 2135 Apr 28 | 2153 May 08 | 2171 May 19 |
27
2189 May 29

=== Tritos series ===
This eclipse is a part of a tritos cycle, repeating at alternating nodes every 135 synodic months (≈ 3986.63 days, or 11 years minus 1 month). Their appearance and longitude are irregular due to a lack of synchronization with the anomalistic month (period of perigee), but groupings of 3 tritos cycles (≈ 33 years minus 3 months) come close (≈ 434.044 anomalistic months), so eclipses are similar in these groupings.

Series members between 1801 and 2200
| 1808 Nov 03 (Saros 123) | 1819 Oct 03 (Saros 124) | 1830 Sep 02 (Saros 125) | 1841 Aug 02 (Saros 126) | 1852 Jul 01 (Saros 127) |
| 1863 Jun 01 (Saros 128) | 1874 May 01 (Saros 129) | 1885 Mar 30 (Saros 130) | 1896 Feb 28 (Saros 131) | 1907 Jan 29 (Saros 132) |
| 1917 Dec 28 (Saros 133) | 1928 Nov 27 (Saros 134) | 1939 Oct 28 (Saros 135) | 1950 Sep 26 (Saros 136) | 1961 Aug 26 (Saros 137) |
| 1972 Jul 26 (Saros 138) | 1983 Jun 25 (Saros 139) | 1994 May 25 (Saros 140) | 2005 Apr 24 (Saros 141) | 2016 Mar 23 (Saros 142) |
| 2027 Feb 20 (Saros 143) | 2038 Jan 21 (Saros 144) | 2048 Dec 20 (Saros 145) | 2059 Nov 19 (Saros 146) | 2070 Oct 19 (Saros 147) |
| 2081 Sep 18 (Saros 148) | 2092 Aug 17 (Saros 149) | 2103 Jul 19 (Saros 150) | 2114 Jun 18 (Saros 151) | 2125 May 17 (Saros 152) |
| 2136 Apr 16 (Saros 153) | | | 2169 Jan 13 (Saros 156) | |
2190 Nov 12 (Saros 158)

=== Inex series ===
This eclipse is a part of the long period inex cycle, repeating at alternating nodes, every 358 synodic months (≈ 10,571.95 days, or 29 years minus 20 days). Their appearance and longitude are irregular due to a lack of synchronization with the anomalistic month (period of perigee). However, groupings of 3 inex cycles (≈ 87 years minus 2 months) comes close (≈ 1,151.02 anomalistic months), so eclipses are similar in these groupings.

Series members between 1801 and 2200
| 1824 Jul 11 (Saros 136) | 1853 Jun 21 (Saros 137) | 1882 Jun 01 (Saros 138) |
| 1911 May 13 (Saros 139) | 1940 Apr 22 (Saros 140) | 1969 Apr 02 (Saros 141) |
| 1998 Mar 13 (Saros 142) | 2027 Feb 20 (Saros 143) | 2056 Feb 01 (Saros 144) |
| 2085 Jan 10 (Saros 145) | 2113 Dec 22 (Saros 146) | 2142 Dec 03 (Saros 147) |
| 2171 Nov 12 (Saros 148) | 2200 Oct 23 (Saros 149) | |

=== Half-Saros cycle ===
A lunar eclipse will be preceded and followed by solar eclipses by 9 years and 5.5 days (a half saros). This lunar eclipse is related to two partial solar eclipses of Solar Saros 150.

| February 15, 2018 | February 27, 2036 |

== See also ==
- List of lunar eclipses and List of 21st-century lunar eclipses
