= January 1955 lunar eclipse =

Penumbral lunar eclipse January 8, 1955

- Penumbral eclipse
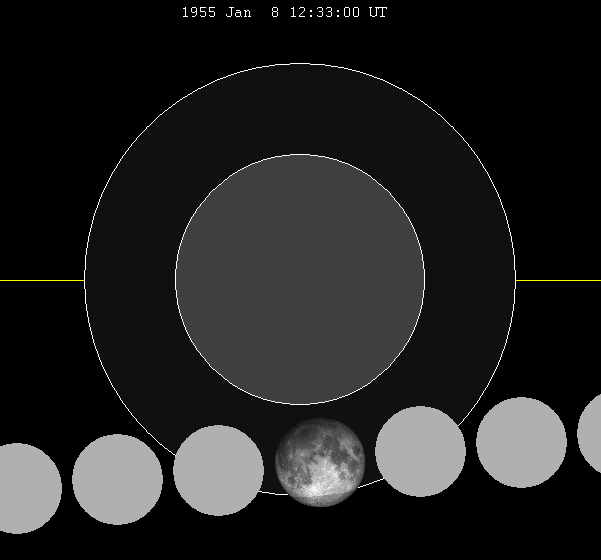
- The Moon's hourly motion shown right to left
- Date: January 8, 1955
- Gamma: −1.0907
- Magnitude: −0.1421
- Saros cycle: 143 (15 of 73)
- Penumbral: 236 minutes, 2 seconds
Contacts (UTC)
- P1: 10:34:46
- Greatest: 12:32:49
- P4: 14:30:48

A penumbral lunar eclipse occurred at the Moon’s descending node of orbit on Saturday, January 8, 1955, with an umbral magnitude of −0.1421. A lunar eclipse occurs when the Moon moves into the Earth's shadow, causing the Moon to be darkened. A penumbral lunar eclipse occurs when part or all of the Moon's near side passes into the Earth's penumbra. Unlike a solar eclipse, which can only be viewed from a relatively small area of the world, a lunar eclipse may be viewed from anywhere on the night side of Earth. Occurring about 2.2 days after perigee (on January 6, 1955, at 8:55 UTC), the Moon's apparent diameter was larger.

== Visibility ==
The eclipse was completely visible over east and north Asia, Australia, and northwestern North America, seen rising over much of the western half of Asia and northern Europe and setting over eastern North America and northwestern South America.

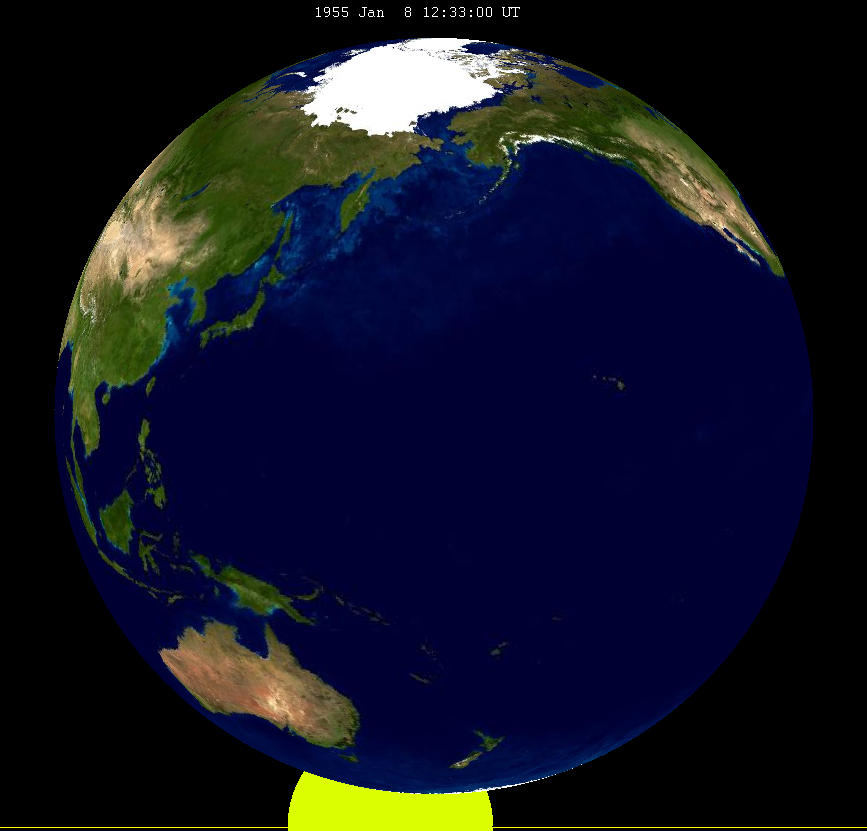
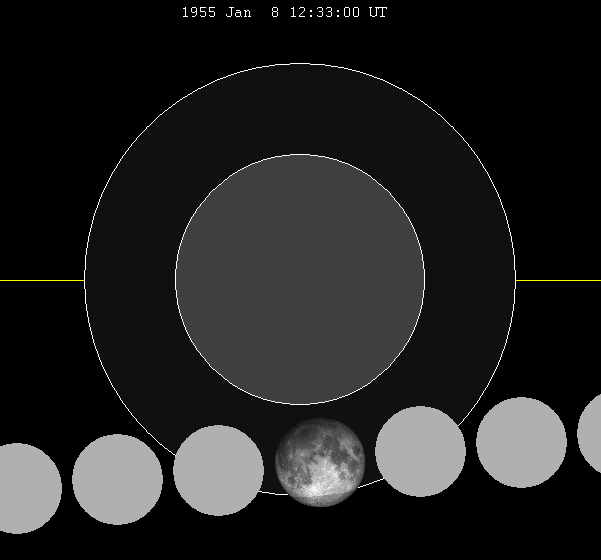

== Eclipse details ==
Shown below is a table displaying details about this particular lunar eclipse. It describes various parameters pertaining to this eclipse.

January 8, 1955 Lunar Eclipse Parameters
Parameter	Value
Penumbral Magnitude	0.85553
Umbral Magnitude	−0.14209
Gamma	−1.09070
Sun Right Ascension	19h15m41.7s
Sun Declination	-22°18'18.6"
Sun Semi-Diameter	16'15.9"
Sun Equatorial Horizontal Parallax	08.9"
Moon Right Ascension	07h14m38.8s
Moon Declination	+21°14'42.2"
Moon Semi-Diameter	16'18.2"
Moon Equatorial Horizontal Parallax	0°59'50.2"
ΔT	31.1 s

== Eclipse season ==
This eclipse is part of an eclipse season, a period, roughly every six months, when eclipses occur. Only two (or occasionally three) eclipse seasons occur each year, and each season lasts about 35 days and repeats just short of six months (173 days) later; thus two full eclipse seasons always occur each year. Either two or three eclipses happen each eclipse season. In the sequence below, each eclipse is separated by a fortnight.

Eclipse season of December 1954–January 1955
December 25 Ascending node (new moon)	January 8 Descending node (full moon)
Annular solar eclipse Solar Saros 131	Penumbral lunar eclipse Lunar Saros 143

== Related eclipses ==
=== Eclipses in 1955 ===
- A penumbral lunar eclipse on January 8.
- A penumbral lunar eclipse on June 5.
- A total solar eclipse on June 20.
- A partial lunar eclipse on November 29.
- An annular solar eclipse on December 14.

=== Metonic ===
- Preceded by: Lunar eclipse of March 23, 1951
- Followed by: Lunar eclipse of October 27, 1958

=== Tzolkinex ===
- Preceded by: Lunar eclipse of November 28, 1947
- Followed by: Lunar eclipse of February 19, 1962

=== Half-Saros ===
- Preceded by: Solar eclipse of January 3, 1946
- Followed by: Solar eclipse of January 14, 1964

=== Tritos ===
- Preceded by: Lunar eclipse of February 9, 1944
- Followed by: Lunar eclipse of December 8, 1965

=== Lunar Saros 143 ===
- Preceded by: Lunar eclipse of December 28, 1936
- Followed by: Lunar eclipse of January 18, 1973

=== Inex ===
- Preceded by: Lunar eclipse of January 28, 1926
- Followed by: Lunar eclipse of December 20, 1983

=== Triad ===
- Preceded by: Lunar eclipse of March 8, 1868
- Followed by: Lunar eclipse of November 8, 2041

=== Lunar eclipses of 1951–1955 ===
This eclipse is a member of a semester series. An eclipse in a semester series of lunar eclipses repeats approximately every 177 days and 4 hours (a semester) at alternating nodes of the Moon's orbit.

The penumbral lunar eclipses on March 23, 1951 and September 15, 1951 occur in the previous lunar year eclipse set, and the lunar eclipses on June 5, 1955 (penumbral) and November 29, 1955 (partial) occur in the next lunar year eclipse set.

Lunar eclipse series sets from 1951 to 1955
Descending node				Ascending node			
Saros	Date Viewing	Type Chart	Gamma	Saros	Date Viewing	Type Chart	Gamma
103	1951 Feb 21	Penumbral	−	108	1951 Aug 17	Penumbral	−1.4828
113	1952 Feb 11	Partial	0.9416	118	1952 Aug 05	Partial	−0.7384
123	1953 Jan 29	Total	0.2606	128	1953 Jul 26	Total	−0.0071
133	1954 Jan 19	Total	−0.4357	138	1954 Jul 16	Partial	0.7877
143	1955 Jan 08	Penumbral	−1.0907				

=== Saros 143 ===
This eclipse is a part of Saros series 143, repeating every 18 years, 11 days, and containing 72 events. The series started with a penumbral lunar eclipse on August 18, 1720. It contains partial eclipses from March 14, 2063 through June 21, 2225; total eclipses from July 2, 2243 through April 13, 2712; and a second set of partial eclipses from April 25, 2730 through July 9, 2856. The series ends at member 72 as a penumbral eclipse on October 5, 3000.

The longest duration of totality will be produced by member 36 at 99 minutes, 9 seconds on September 6, 2351. All eclipses in this series occur at the Moon’s descending node of orbit.

Greatest	First			
The greatest eclipse of the series will occur on 2351 Sep 06, lasting 99 minutes, 9 seconds.	Penumbral	Partial	Total	Central
The greatest eclipse of the series will occur on 2351 Sep 06, lasting 99 minutes, 9 seconds.	1720 Aug 18	2063 Mar 14	2243 Jul 02	2297 Aug 03
The greatest eclipse of the series will occur on 2351 Sep 06, lasting 99 minutes, 9 seconds.	Last			
The greatest eclipse of the series will occur on 2351 Sep 06, lasting 99 minutes, 9 seconds.	Central	Total	Partial	Penumbral
The greatest eclipse of the series will occur on 2351 Sep 06, lasting 99 minutes, 9 seconds.	2495 Dec 02	2712 Apr 13	2856 Jul 09	3000 Oct 05

Eclipses are tabulated in three columns; every third eclipse in the same column is one exeligmos apart, so they all cast shadows over approximately the same parts of the Earth.

Series members 6–27 occur between 1801 and 2200:
6	7	8
1810 Oct 12	1828 Oct 23	1846 Nov 03
9	10	11
1864 Nov 13	1882 Nov 25	1900 Dec 06
12	13	14
1918 Dec 17	1936 Dec 28	1955 Jan 08
15	16	17
1973 Jan 18	1991 Jan 30	2009 Feb 09
18	19	20
2027 Feb 20	2045 Mar 03	2063 Mar 14
21	22	23
2081 Mar 25	2099 Apr 05	2117 Apr 16
24	25	26
2135 Apr 28	2153 May 08	2171 May 19
27
2189 May 29

=== Tritos series ===
This eclipse is a part of a tritos cycle, repeating at alternating nodes every 135 synodic months (≈ 3986.63 days, or 11 years minus 1 month). Their appearance and longitude are irregular due to a lack of synchronization with the anomalistic month (period of perigee), but groupings of 3 tritos cycles (≈ 33 years minus 3 months) come close (≈ 434.044 anomalistic months), so eclipses are similar in these groupings.

Series members between 1801 and 2096
1802 Mar 19 (Saros 129)	1813 Feb 15 (Saros 130)	1824 Jan 16 (Saros 131)	1834 Dec 16 (Saros 132)	1845 Nov 14 (Saros 133)
1856 Oct 13 (Saros 134)	1867 Sep 14 (Saros 135)	1878 Aug 13 (Saros 136)	1889 Jul 12 (Saros 137)	1900 Jun 13 (Saros 138)
1911 May 13 (Saros 139)	1922 Apr 11 (Saros 140)	1933 Mar 12 (Saros 141)	1944 Feb 09 (Saros 142)	1955 Jan 08 (Saros 143)
1965 Dec 08 (Saros 144)	1976 Nov 06 (Saros 145)	1987 Oct 07 (Saros 146)	1998 Sep 06 (Saros 147)	2009 Aug 06 (Saros 148)
2020 Jul 05 (Saros 149)	2031 Jun 05 (Saros 150)			
		2096 Nov 29 (Saros 156)		

=== Inex series ===
This eclipse is a part of the long period inex cycle, repeating at alternating nodes, every 358 synodic months (≈ 10,571.95 days, or 29 years minus 20 days). Their appearance and longitude are irregular due to a lack of synchronization with the anomalistic month (period of perigee). However, groupings of 3 inex cycles (≈ 87 years minus 2 months) comes close (≈ 1,151.02 anomalistic months), so eclipses are similar in these groupings.

Series members between 1801 and 2200
1810 Apr 19 (Saros 138)	1839 Mar 30 (Saros 139)	1868 Mar 08 (Saros 140)
1897 Feb 17 (Saros 141)	1926 Jan 28 (Saros 142)	1955 Jan 08 (Saros 143)
1983 Dec 20 (Saros 144)	2012 Nov 28 (Saros 145)	2041 Nov 08 (Saros 146)
2070 Oct 19 (Saros 147)	2099 Sep 29 (Saros 148)	2128 Sep 09 (Saros 149)
2157 Aug 20 (Saros 150)	2186 Jul 31 (Saros 151)	

=== Half-Saros cycle ===
A lunar eclipse will be preceded and followed by solar eclipses by 9 years and 5.5 days (a half saros). This lunar eclipse is related to two partial solar eclipses of Solar Saros 150.

January 3, 1946	January 14, 1964

== See also ==
- List of lunar eclipses
- List of 20th-century lunar eclipses
