= March 2045 lunar eclipse =

Astronomical event

- Penumbral eclipse
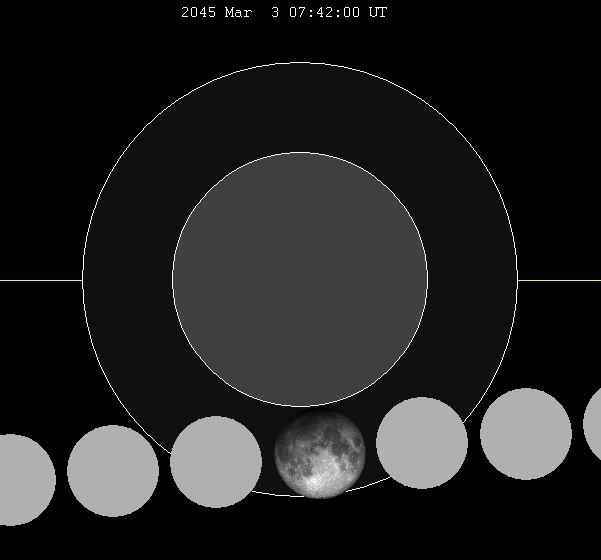
- The Moon's hourly motion shown right to left
- Date: March 3, 2045
- Gamma: −1.0274
- Magnitude: −0.0148
- Saros cycle: 143 (19 of 72)
- Penumbral: 243 minutes, 57 seconds
Contacts (UTC)
- P1: 5:39:58
- Greatest: 7:43:26
- P4: 9:43:55

A penumbral lunar eclipse will occur at the Moon’s descending node of orbit on Friday, March 3, 2045, with an umbral magnitude of −0.0148. A lunar eclipse occurs when the Moon moves into the Earth's shadow, causing the Moon to be darkened. A penumbral lunar eclipse occurs when part or all of the Moon's near side passes into the Earth's penumbra. Unlike a solar eclipse, which can only be viewed from a relatively small area of the world, a lunar eclipse may be viewed from anywhere on the night side of Earth. Occurring about 1.8 days after perigee (on March 1, 2045, at 13:40 UTC), the Moon's apparent diameter will be larger.

== Visibility ==
The eclipse will be completely visible over North and South America, seen rising over northeast Asia and eastern Australia and setting over west Africa and western Europe.

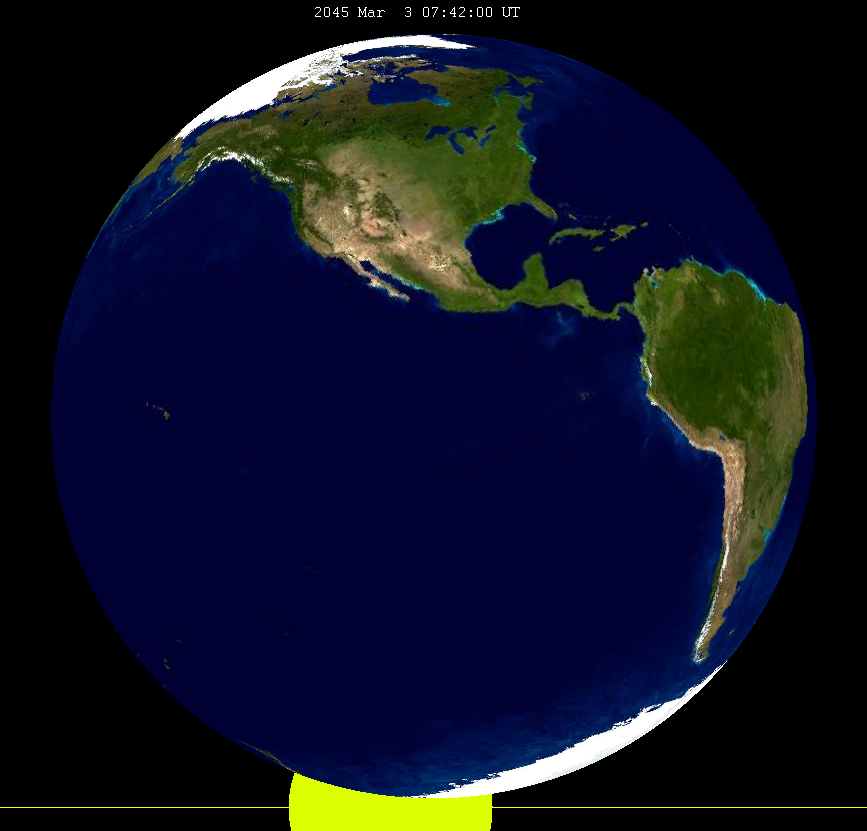
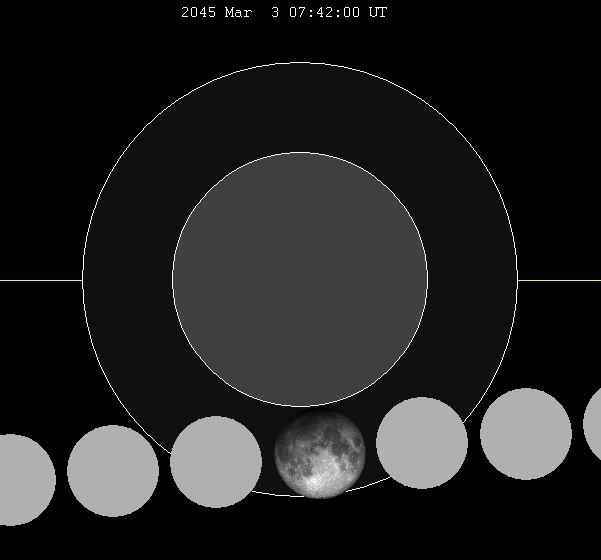

== Eclipse details ==
Shown below is a table displaying details about this particular lunar eclipse. It describes various parameters pertaining to this eclipse.

March 3, 2045 Lunar Eclipse Parameters
Parameter	Value
Penumbral Magnitude	0.96431
Umbral Magnitude	−0.01482
Gamma	−1.02738
Sun Right Ascension	22h57m49.1s
Sun Declination	-06°37'35.6"
Sun Semi-Diameter	16'08.1"
Sun Equatorial Horizontal Parallax	08.9"
Moon Right Ascension	10h55m51.5s
Moon Declination	+05°42'46.0"
Moon Semi-Diameter	16'28.7"
Moon Equatorial Horizontal Parallax	1°00'28.6"
ΔT	82.1 s

== Eclipse season ==
This eclipse is part of an eclipse season, a period, roughly every six months, when eclipses occur. Only two (or occasionally three) eclipse seasons occur each year, and each season lasts about 35 days and repeats just short of six months (173 days) later; thus two full eclipse seasons always occur each year. Either two or three eclipses happen each eclipse season. In the sequence below, each eclipse is separated by a fortnight.

Eclipse season of February–March 2045
February 16 Ascending node (new moon)	March 3 Descending node (full moon)
Annular solar eclipse Solar Saros 131	Penumbral lunar eclipse Lunar Saros 143

== Related eclipses ==
=== Eclipses in 2045 ===
- An annular solar eclipse on February 16.
- A penumbral lunar eclipse on March 3.
- A total solar eclipse on August 12.
- A penumbral lunar eclipse on August 27.

=== Metonic ===
- Preceded by: Lunar eclipse of May 16, 2041
- Followed by: Lunar eclipse of December 20, 2048

=== Tzolkinex ===
- Preceded by: Lunar eclipse of January 21, 2038
- Followed by: Lunar eclipse of April 14, 2052

=== Half-Saros ===
- Preceded by: Solar eclipse of February 27, 2036
- Followed by: Solar eclipse of March 9, 2054

=== Tritos ===
- Preceded by: Lunar eclipse of April 3, 2034
- Followed by: Lunar eclipse of February 1, 2056

=== Lunar Saros 143 ===
- Preceded by: Lunar eclipse of February 20, 2027
- Followed by: Lunar eclipse of March 14, 2063

=== Inex ===
- Preceded by: Lunar eclipse of March 23, 2016
- Followed by: Lunar eclipse of February 11, 2074

=== Triad ===
- Preceded by: Lunar eclipse of May 3, 1958
- Followed by: Lunar eclipse of January 2, 2132

=== Lunar eclipses of 2042–2045 ===
This eclipse is a member of a semester series. An eclipse in a semester series of lunar eclipses repeats approximately every 177 days and 4 hours (a semester) at alternating nodes of the Moon's orbit.

The penumbral lunar eclipse on October 28, 2042 occurs in the previous lunar year eclipse set.

Lunar eclipse series sets from 2042 to 2045
Descending node				Ascending node			
Saros	Date Viewing	Type Chart	Gamma	Saros	Date Viewing	Type Chart	Gamma
113	2042 Apr 05	Penumbral	1.1080	118	2042 Sep 29	Penumbral	−1.0261
123	2043 Mar 25	Total	0.3849	128	2043 Sep 19	Total	−0.3316
133	2044 Mar 13	Total	−0.3496	138	2044 Sep 07	Total	0.4318
143	2045 Mar 03	Penumbral	−1.0274	148	2045 Aug 27	Penumbral	1.2060

=== Metonic series ===
The Metonic cycle repeats nearly exactly every 19 years and represents a Saros cycle plus one lunar year. Because it occurs on the same calendar date, the Earth's shadow will be in nearly the same location relative to the background stars.

1. 1988 Mar 03.675 – Partial (113); 2. 2007 Mar 03.972 – Total (123); 3. 2026 Mar 03.481 – Total (133); 4. 2045 Mar 03.320 – Penumbral (143)	1. 1988 Aug 27.461 – partial (118); 2. 2007 Aug 28.442 – total (128); 3. 2026 Aug 28.175 – partial (138); 4. 2045 Aug 27.578 – penumbral (148)

=== Saros 143 ===
This eclipse is a part of Saros series 143, repeating every 18 years, 11 days, and containing 72 events. The series started with a penumbral lunar eclipse on August 18, 1720. It contains partial eclipses from March 14, 2063 through June 21, 2225; total eclipses from July 2, 2243 through April 13, 2712; and a second set of partial eclipses from April 25, 2730 through July 9, 2856. The series ends at member 72 as a penumbral eclipse on October 5, 3000.

The longest duration of totality will be produced by member 36 at 99 minutes, 9 seconds on September 6, 2351. All eclipses in this series occur at the Moon’s descending node of orbit.

Greatest	First			
The greatest eclipse of the series will occur on 2351 Sep 06, lasting 99 minutes, 9 seconds.	Penumbral	Partial	Total	Central
The greatest eclipse of the series will occur on 2351 Sep 06, lasting 99 minutes, 9 seconds.	1720 Aug 18	2063 Mar 14	2243 Jul 02	2297 Aug 03
The greatest eclipse of the series will occur on 2351 Sep 06, lasting 99 minutes, 9 seconds.	Last			
The greatest eclipse of the series will occur on 2351 Sep 06, lasting 99 minutes, 9 seconds.	Central	Total	Partial	Penumbral
The greatest eclipse of the series will occur on 2351 Sep 06, lasting 99 minutes, 9 seconds.	2495 Dec 02	2712 Apr 13	2856 Jul 09	3000 Oct 05

Eclipses are tabulated in three columns; every third eclipse in the same column is one exeligmos apart, so they all cast shadows over approximately the same parts of the Earth.

Series members 6–27 occur between 1801 and 2200:
6	7	8
1810 Oct 12	1828 Oct 23	1846 Nov 03
9	10	11
1864 Nov 13	1882 Nov 25	1900 Dec 06
12	13	14
1918 Dec 17	1936 Dec 28	1955 Jan 08
15	16	17
1973 Jan 18	1991 Jan 30	2009 Feb 09
18	19	20
2027 Feb 20	2045 Mar 03	2063 Mar 14
21	22	23
2081 Mar 25	2099 Apr 05	2117 Apr 16
24	25	26
2135 Apr 28	2153 May 08	2171 May 19
27
2189 May 29

=== Tritos series ===
This eclipse is a part of a tritos cycle, repeating at alternating nodes every 135 synodic months (≈ 3986.63 days, or 11 years minus 1 month). Their appearance and longitude are irregular due to a lack of synchronization with the anomalistic month (period of perigee), but groupings of 3 tritos cycles (≈ 33 years minus 3 months) come close (≈ 434.044 anomalistic months), so eclipses are similar in these groupings.

Series members between 1801 and 2187
1805 Jan 15 (Saros 121)	1815 Dec 16 (Saros 122)	1826 Nov 14 (Saros 123)	1837 Oct 13 (Saros 124)	1848 Sep 13 (Saros 125)
1859 Aug 13 (Saros 126)	1870 Jul 12 (Saros 127)	1881 Jun 12 (Saros 128)	1892 May 11 (Saros 129)	1903 Apr 12 (Saros 130)
1914 Mar 12 (Saros 131)	1925 Feb 08 (Saros 132)	1936 Jan 08 (Saros 133)	1946 Dec 08 (Saros 134)	1957 Nov 07 (Saros 135)
1968 Oct 06 (Saros 136)	1979 Sep 06 (Saros 137)	1990 Aug 06 (Saros 138)	2001 Jul 05 (Saros 139)	2012 Jun 04 (Saros 140)
2023 May 05 (Saros 141)	2034 Apr 03 (Saros 142)	2045 Mar 03 (Saros 143)	2056 Feb 01 (Saros 144)	2066 Dec 31 (Saros 145)
2077 Nov 29 (Saros 146)	2088 Oct 30 (Saros 147)	2099 Sep 29 (Saros 148)	2110 Aug 29 (Saros 149)	2121 Jul 30 (Saros 150)
2132 Jun 28 (Saros 151)	2143 May 28 (Saros 152)	2154 Apr 28 (Saros 153)		
2187 Jan 24 (Saros 156)

=== Inex series ===
This eclipse is a part of the long period inex cycle, repeating at alternating nodes, every 358 synodic months (≈ 10,571.95 days, or 29 years minus 20 days). Their appearance and longitude are irregular due to a lack of synchronization with the anomalistic month (period of perigee). However, groupings of 3 inex cycles (≈ 87 years minus 2 months) comes close (≈ 1,151.02 anomalistic months), so eclipses are similar in these groupings.

Series members between 1801 and 2200
1813 Aug 12 (Saros 135)	1842 Jul 22 (Saros 136)	1871 Jul 02 (Saros 137)
1900 Jun 13 (Saros 138)	1929 May 23 (Saros 139)	1958 May 03 (Saros 140)
1987 Apr 14 (Saros 141)	2016 Mar 23 (Saros 142)	2045 Mar 03 (Saros 143)
2074 Feb 11 (Saros 144)	2103 Jan 23 (Saros 145)	2132 Jan 02 (Saros 146)
2160 Dec 13 (Saros 147)	2189 Nov 22 (Saros 148)	

=== Half-Saros cycle ===
A lunar eclipse will be preceded and followed by solar eclipses by 9 years and 5.5 days (a half saros). This lunar eclipse is related to two partial solar eclipses of Solar Saros 150.

February 27, 2036	March 9, 2054

== See also ==
- List of lunar eclipses and List of 21st-century lunar eclipses
