= Lunar Saros 143 =

Eclipse cycle of the moon

Member 17
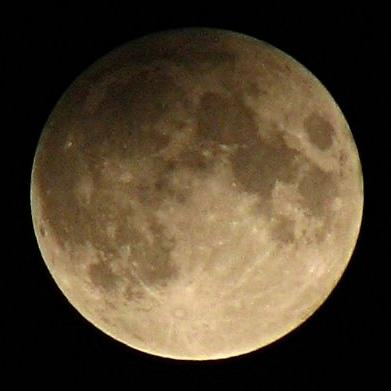
2009 Feb 9

Saros cycle series 143 for lunar eclipses occurs at the moon's descending node, repeats every 18 years 11 and 1/3 days. It contains 72 events.

== List ==
Cat.	Saros	Mem	Date	Time UT (hr:mn)	Type	Gamma	Magnitude	Duration (min)			Contacts UT (hr:mn)						Chart
Cat.	Saros	Mem	Date	Greatest	Type	Gamma	Magnitude	Pen.	Par.	Tot.	P1	P4	U1	U2	U3	U4	Chart
08968	143	1	1720 Aug 18	2:31:47	Penumbral	-1.4936	-0.8866	99.2			1:42:11	3:21:23					
09015	143	2	1738 Aug 29	9:51:16	Penumbral	-1.4268	-0.7636	138.5			8:42:01	11:00:31					
09062	143	3	1756 Sep 08	17:19:28	Penumbral	-1.3658	-0.6514	165.0			15:56:58	18:41:58					
09108	143	4	1774 Sep 20	0:57:04	Penumbral	-1.3118	-0.5520	184.2			23:24:58	2:29:10					
09153	143	5	1792 Sep 30	8:43:05	Penumbral	-1.2636	-0.4634	199.0			7:03:35	10:22:35					
09198	143	6	1810 Oct 12	16:39:20	Penumbral	-1.2230	-0.3889	210.1			14:54:17	18:24:23					
09243	143	7	1828 Oct 23	0:44:42	Penumbral	-1.1889	-0.3263	218.5			22:55:27	2:33:57					
09290	143	8	1846 Nov 03	8:59:23	Penumbral	-1.1618	-0.2766	224.5			7:07:08	10:51:38					
09334	143	9	1864 Nov 13	17:21:25	Penumbral	-1.1402	-0.2367	228.9			15:26:58	19:15:52					
09377	143	10	1882 Nov 25	1:51:01	Penumbral	-1.1243	-0.2071	231.8			23:55:07	3:46:55					
09421	143	11	1900 Dec 06	10:26:29	Penumbral	-1.1125	-0.1851	233.7			8:29:38	12:23:20					
09463	143	12	1918 Dec 17	19:06:01	Penumbral	-1.1035	-0.1679	234.9			17:08:34	21:03:28					
09505	143	13	1936 Dec 28	3:49:09	Penumbral	-1.0970	-0.1550	235.5			1:51:24	5:46:54					
09546	143	14	1955 Jan 08	12:33:20	Penumbral	-1.0906	-0.1421	236.0			10:35:20	14:31:20					
09587	143	15	1973 Jan 18	21:17:58	Penumbral	-1.0844	-0.1293	236.5			19:19:43	23:16:13					
09628	143	16	1991 Jan 30	5:59:38	Penumbral	-1.0752	-0.1106	237.5			4:00:53	7:58:23					
09669	143	17	2009 Feb 09	14:39:22	Penumbral	-1.0640	-0.0882	238.8			12:39:58	16:38:46					
09710	143	18	2027 Feb 20	23:14:06	Penumbral	-1.0480	-0.0569	241.0			21:13:36	1:14:36					
09751	143	19	2045 Mar 03	7:43:26	Penumbral	-1.0274	-0.0168	243.9			5:41:29	9:45:23					
09792	143	20	2063 Mar 14	16:05:49	Partial	-1.0007	0.0342	247.8	40.6		14:01:55	18:09:43	15:45:31			16:26:07	
09833	143	21	2081 Mar 25	0:22:01	Partial	-0.9687	0.0953	252.4	67.1		22:15:49	2:28:13	23:48:28			0:55:34	
09875	143	22	2099 Apr 05	8:30:56	Partial	-0.9304	0.1680	257.7	88.1		6:22:05	10:39:47	7:46:53			9:14:59	
09917	143	23	2117 Apr 16	16:32:00	Partial	-0.8852	0.2530	263.7	106.6		14:20:09	18:43:51	15:38:42			17:25:18	
09959	143	24	2135 Apr 28	0:26:35	Partial	-0.8344	0.3483	269.9	123.2		22:11:38	2:41:32	23:24:59			1:28:11	
10003	143	25	2153 May 08	8:14:39	Partial	-0.7781	0.4535	276.3	138.3		5:56:30	10:32:48	7:05:30			9:23:48	
10046	143	26	2171 May 19	15:56:55	Partial	-0.7166	0.5680	282.7	151.9		13:35:34	18:18:16	14:40:58			17:12:52	
10089	143	27	2189 May 29	23:34:01	Partial	-0.6505	0.6909	288.8	164.1		21:09:37	1:58:25	22:11:58			0:56:04	
10132	143	28	2207 Jun 11	7:07:39	Partial	-0.5811	0.8193	294.5	174.8		4:40:24	9:34:54	5:40:15			8:35:03	
10176	143	29	2225 Jun 21	14:38:56	Partial	-0.5097	0.9512	299.7	183.9		12:09:05	17:08:47	13:06:59			16:10:53	
10221	143	30	2243 Jul 02	22:07:19	Total	-0.4355	1.0880	304.3	191.8	43.2	19:35:10	0:39:28	20:31:25	21:45:43	22:28:55	23:43:13	
10267	143	31	2261 Jul 13	5:36:18	Total	-0.3617	1.2235	308.2	198.1	66.0	3:02:12	8:10:24	3:57:15	5:03:18	6:09:18	7:15:21	
10313	143	32	2279 Jul 24	13:05:07	Total	-0.2877	1.3593	311.4	203.1	79.9	10:29:25	15:40:49	11:23:34	12:25:10	13:45:04	14:46:40	
10360	143	33	2297 Aug 03	20:37:10	Total	-0.2162	1.4901	313.9	206.8	88.9	18:00:13	23:14:07	18:53:46	19:52:43	21:21:37	22:20:34	
10406	143	34	2315 Aug 16	4:10:27	Total	-0.1459	1.6185	315.7	209.3	94.7	1:32:36	6:48:18	2:25:48	3:23:06	4:57:48	5:55:06	
10452	143	35	2333 Aug 26	11:49:39	Total	-0.0807	1.7372	317.0	210.8	97.9	9:11:09	14:28:09	10:04:15	11:00:42	12:38:36	13:35:03	
10498	143	36	2351 Sep 06	19:32:42	Total	-0.0188	1.8495	317.7	211.4	99.1	16:53:51	22:11:33	17:47:00	18:43:09	20:22:15	21:18:24	
10543	143	37	2369 Sep 17	3:22:09	Total	0.0374	1.8139	318.1	211.3	98.8	0:43:06	6:01:12	1:36:30	2:32:45	4:11:33	5:07:48	
10587	143	38	2387 Sep 28	11:16:56	Total	0.0890	1.7176	318.1	210.7	97.3	8:37:53	13:55:59	9:31:35	10:28:17	12:05:35	13:02:17	
10632	143	39	2405 Oct 08	19:19:56	Total	0.1336	1.6341	318.1	209.7	95.1	16:40:53	21:58:59	17:35:05	18:32:23	20:07:29	21:04:47	
10676	143	40	2423 Oct 20	3:29:19	Total	0.1723	1.5612	317.9	208.6	92.3	0:50:22	6:08:16	1:45:01	2:43:10	4:15:28	5:13:37	
10720	143	41	2441 Oct 30	11:45:56	Total	0.2048	1.4997	317.8	207.4	89.3	9:07:02	14:24:50	10:02:14	11:01:17	12:30:35	13:29:38	
10764	143	42	2459 Nov 10	20:09:31	Total	0.2312	1.4492	317.7	206.3	86.3	17:30:40	22:48:22	18:26:22	19:26:22	20:52:40	21:52:40	
10806	143	43	2477 Nov 21	4:40:34	Total	0.2515	1.4101	317.8	205.4	83.8	2:01:40	7:19:28	2:57:52	3:58:40	5:22:28	6:23:16	
10848	143	44	2495 Dec 02	13:16:56	Total	0.2671	1.3799	318.0	204.8	81.6	10:37:56	15:55:56	11:34:32	12:36:08	13:57:44	14:59:20	
10889	143	45	2513 Dec 13	21:58:14	Total	0.2783	1.3576	318.4	204.3	79.8	19:19:02	0:37:26	20:16:05	21:18:20	22:38:08	23:40:23	
10929	143	46	2531 Dec 25	6:43:03	Total	0.2865	1.3412	318.8	204.0	78.5	4:03:39	9:22:27	5:01:03	6:03:48	7:22:18	8:25:03	
10970	143	47	2550 Jan 04	15:31:00	Total	0.2921	1.3299	319.4	203.9	77.6	12:51:18	18:10:42	13:49:03	14:52:12	16:09:48	17:12:57	
11012	143	48	2568 Jan 16	0:18:34	Total	0.2977	1.3185	319.9	203.9	76.7	21:38:37	2:58:31	22:36:37	23:40:13	0:56:55	2:00:31	
11052	143	49	2586 Jan 26	9:06:34	Total	0.3029	1.3083	320.5	203.9	75.8	6:26:19	11:46:49	7:24:37	8:28:40	9:44:28	10:48:31	
11092	143	50	2604 Feb 07	17:51:11	Total	0.3106	1.2936	320.9	203.7	74.5	15:10:44	20:31:38	16:09:20	17:13:56	18:28:26	19:33:02	
11132	143	51	2622 Feb 18	2:32:59	Total	0.3201	1.2758	321.2	203.5	72.8	23:52:23	5:13:35	0:51:14	1:56:35	3:09:23	4:14:44	
11173	143	52	2640 Feb 29	11:07:48	Total	0.3353	1.2478	321.3	202.8	69.8	8:27:09	13:48:27	9:26:24	10:32:54	11:42:42	12:49:12	
11214	143	53	2658 Mar 11	19:37:41	Total	0.3539	1.2136	321.2	201.9	65.7	16:57:05	22:18:17	17:56:44	19:04:50	20:10:32	21:18:38	
11257	143	54	2676 Mar 22	3:59:06	Total	0.3793	1.1670	320.6	200.3	59.1	1:18:48	6:39:24	2:18:57	3:29:33	4:28:39	5:39:15	
11300	143	55	2694 Apr 02	12:12:44	Total	0.4106	1.1098	319.7	198.0	49.0	9:32:53	14:52:35	10:33:44	11:48:14	12:37:14	13:51:44	
11343	143	56	2712 Apr 13	20:16:52	Total	0.4490	1.0393	318.2	194.7	30.0	17:37:46	22:55:58	18:39:31	20:01:52	20:31:52	21:54:13	
11385	143	57	2730 Apr 25	4:13:03	Partial	0.4934	0.9579	316.1	190.3		1:35:00	6:51:06	2:37:54			5:48:12	
11428	143	58	2748 May 5	12:00:09	Partial	0.5449	0.8633	313.1	184.3		9:23:36	14:36:42	10:28:00			13:32:18	
11472	143	59	2766 May 16	19:38:18	Partial	0.6030	0.7565	309.1	176.2		17:03:45	22:12:51	18:10:12			21:06:24	
11516	143	60	2784 May 27	3:08:54	Partial	0.6667	0.6392	304.0	165.7		0:36:54	5:40:54	1:46:03			4:31:45	
11562	143	61	2802 Jun 07	10:32:24	Partial	0.7352	0.5129	297.6	151.9		8:03:36	13:01:12	9:16:27			11:48:21	
11609	143	62	2820 Jun 17	17:49:32	Partial	0.8082	0.3781	289.6	133.5		15:24:44	20:14:20	16:42:47			18:56:17	
11656	143	63	2838 Jun 29	1:01:07	Partial	0.8850	0.2362	279.9	108.1		22:41:10	3:21:04	0:07:04			1:55:10	
11702	143	64	2856 Jul 09	8:09:01	Partial	0.9636	0.0906	268.4	68.6		5:54:49	10:23:13	7:34:43			8:43:19	
11748	143	65	2874 Jul 20	15:14:11	Penumbral	1.0433	-0.0571	254.9			13:06:44	17:21:38					
11794	143	66	2892 Jul 30	22:16:27	Penumbral	1.1241	-0.2074	238.9			20:17:00	0:15:54					
11839	143	67	2910 Aug 12	5:19:18	Penumbral	1.2032	-0.3546	220.6			3:29:00	7:09:36					
11884	143	68	2928 Aug 22	12:22:23	Penumbral	1.2807	-0.4992	199.2			10:42:47	14:01:59					
11929	143	69	2946 Sep 02	19:28:48	Penumbral	1.3545	-0.6370	174.6			18:01:30	20:56:06					
11975	143	70	2964 Sep 13	2:37:10	Penumbral	1.4252	-0.7696	145.0			1:24:40	3:49:40					
12020	143	71	2982 Sep 24	9:51:36	Penumbral	1.4899	-0.8911	108.8			8:57:12	10:46:00					
12063	143	72	3000 Oct 05	17:10:38	Penumbral	1.5497	-1.0039	53.5			16:43:53	17:37:23					

== See also ==
- List of lunar eclipses
  - List of Saros series for lunar eclipses
