= January 1991 lunar eclipse =

Penumbral lunar eclipse January 30, 1991

- Penumbral eclipse
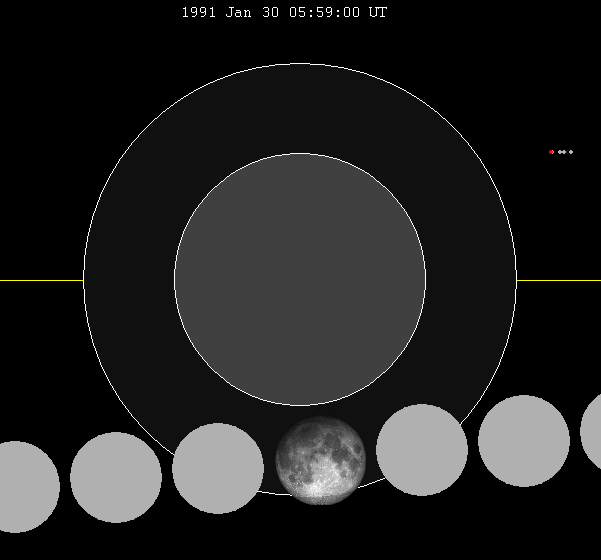
- The Moon's hourly motion shown right to left
- Date: January 30, 1991
- Gamma: −1.0752
- Magnitude: −0.1106
- Saros cycle: 143 (17 of 73)
- Penumbral: 237 minutes, 28 seconds
Contacts (UTC)
- P1: 3:59:55
- Greatest: 5:58:40
- P4: 7:57:23

A penumbral lunar eclipse occurred at the Moon’s descending node of orbit on Wednesday, January 30, 1991, with an umbral magnitude of −0.1106. A lunar eclipse occurs when the Moon moves into the Earth's shadow, causing the Moon to be darkened. A penumbral lunar eclipse occurs when part or all of the Moon's near side passes into the Earth's penumbra. Unlike a solar eclipse, which can only be viewed from a relatively small area of the world, a lunar eclipse may be viewed from anywhere on the night side of Earth. Occurring about 1.9 days after perigee (on January 28, 1991, at 8:35 UTC), the Moon's apparent diameter was larger.

This eclipse was the first of four lunar eclipses in 1991, with the others occurring on June 27 (penumbral), July 26 (penumbral), and December 21 (partial).

== Visibility ==
The eclipse was completely visible over North and South America, seen rising over northeast Asia and the central Pacific Ocean and setting over much of Africa and Europe.

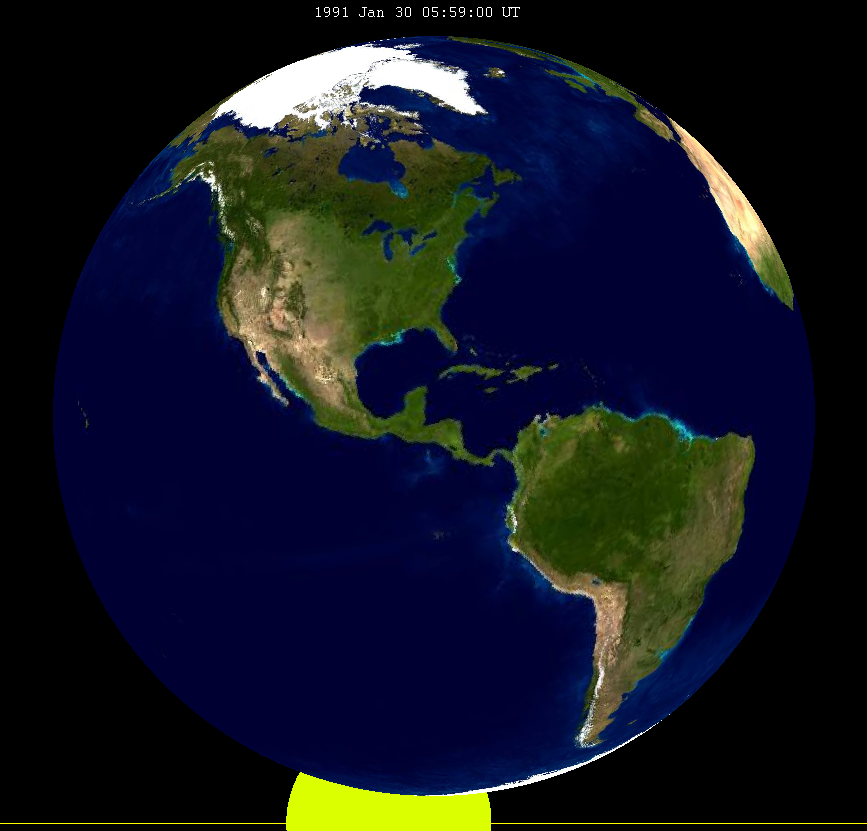
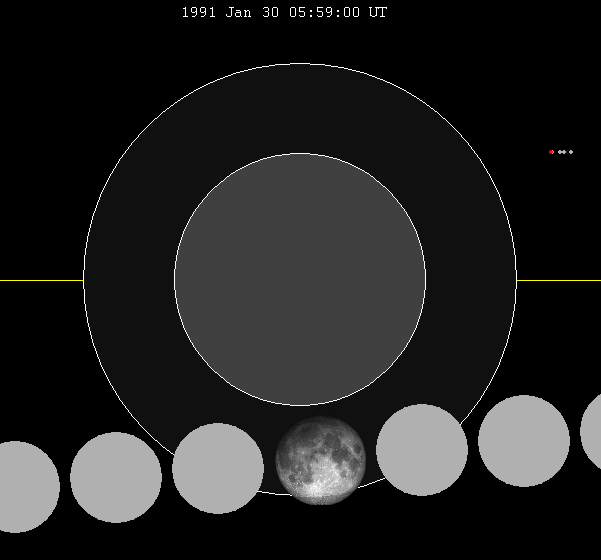

== Eclipse details ==
Shown below is a table displaying details about this particular solar eclipse. It describes various parameters pertaining to this eclipse.

January 30, 1991 Lunar Eclipse Parameters
Parameter	Value
Penumbral Magnitude	0.88079
Umbral Magnitude	−0.11060
Gamma	−1.07522
Sun Right Ascension	20h49m07.1s
Sun Declination	-17°47'12.6"
Sun Semi-Diameter	16'14.2"
Sun Equatorial Horizontal Parallax	08.9"
Moon Right Ascension	08h47m30.0s
Moon Declination	+16°46'53.1"
Moon Semi-Diameter	16'22.7"
Moon Equatorial Horizontal Parallax	1°00'06.5"
ΔT	57.6 s

== Eclipse season ==
This eclipse is part of an eclipse season, a period, roughly every six months, when eclipses occur. Only two (or occasionally three) eclipse seasons occur each year, and each season lasts about 35 days and repeats just short of six months (173 days) later; thus two full eclipse seasons always occur each year. Either two or three eclipses happen each eclipse season. In the sequence below, each eclipse is separated by a fortnight.

Eclipse season of January 1991
January 15 Ascending node (new moon)	January 30 Descending node (full moon)
Annular solar eclipse Solar Saros 131	Penumbral lunar eclipse Lunar Saros 143

== Related eclipses ==
=== Eclipses in 1991 ===
- An annular solar eclipse on January 15.
- A penumbral lunar eclipse on January 30.
- A penumbral lunar eclipse on June 27.
- A total solar eclipse on July 11.
- A penumbral lunar eclipse on July 26.
- A partial lunar eclipse on December 21.

=== Metonic ===
- Preceded by: Lunar eclipse of April 14, 1987
- Followed by: Lunar eclipse of November 18, 1994

=== Tzolkinex ===
- Preceded by: Lunar eclipse of December 20, 1983
- Followed by: Lunar eclipse of March 13, 1998

=== Half-Saros ===
- Preceded by: Solar eclipse of January 25, 1982
- Followed by: Solar eclipse of February 5, 2000

=== Tritos ===
- Preceded by: Lunar eclipse of March 1, 1980
- Followed by: Lunar eclipse of December 30, 2001

=== Lunar Saros 143 ===
- Preceded by: Lunar eclipse of January 18, 1973
- Followed by: Lunar eclipse of February 9, 2009

=== Inex ===
- Preceded by: Lunar eclipse of February 19, 1962
- Followed by: Lunar eclipse of January 10, 2020

=== Triad ===
- Preceded by: Lunar eclipse of March 31, 1904
- Followed by: Lunar eclipse of November 29, 2077

=== Lunar eclipses of 1988–1991 ===
This eclipse is a member of a semester series. An eclipse in a semester series of lunar eclipses repeats approximately every 177 days and 4 hours (a semester) at alternating nodes of the Moon's orbit.

The lunar eclipses on June 27, 1991 (penumbral) and December 21, 1991 (partial) occur in the next lunar year eclipse set.

Lunar eclipse series sets from 1988 to 1991
Descending node				Ascending node			
Saros	Date Viewing	Type Chart	Gamma	Saros	Date Viewing	Type Chart	Gamma
113	1988 Mar 03	Penumbral	0.9886	118	1988 Aug 27	Partial	−0.8682
123	1989 Feb 20	Total	0.2935	128	1989 Aug 17	Total	−0.1491
133	1990 Feb 09	Total	−0.4148	138	1990 Aug 06	Partial	0.6374
143	1991 Jan 30	Penumbral	−1.0752	148	1991 Jul 26	Penumbral	1.4370

=== Saros 143 ===
This eclipse is a part of Saros series 143, repeating every 18 years, 11 days, and containing 72 events. The series started with a penumbral lunar eclipse on August 18, 1720. It contains partial eclipses from March 14, 2063 through June 21, 2225; total eclipses from July 2, 2243 through April 13, 2712; and a second set of partial eclipses from April 25, 2730 through July 9, 2856. The series ends at member 72 as a penumbral eclipse on October 5, 3000.

The longest duration of totality will be produced by member 36 at 99 minutes, 9 seconds on September 6, 2351. All eclipses in this series occur at the Moon’s descending node of orbit.

Greatest	First			
The greatest eclipse of the series will occur on 2351 Sep 06, lasting 99 minutes, 9 seconds.	Penumbral	Partial	Total	Central
The greatest eclipse of the series will occur on 2351 Sep 06, lasting 99 minutes, 9 seconds.	1720 Aug 18	2063 Mar 14	2243 Jul 02	2297 Aug 03
The greatest eclipse of the series will occur on 2351 Sep 06, lasting 99 minutes, 9 seconds.	Last			
The greatest eclipse of the series will occur on 2351 Sep 06, lasting 99 minutes, 9 seconds.	Central	Total	Partial	Penumbral
The greatest eclipse of the series will occur on 2351 Sep 06, lasting 99 minutes, 9 seconds.	2495 Dec 02	2712 Apr 13	2856 Jul 09	3000 Oct 05

Eclipses are tabulated in three columns; every third eclipse in the same column is one exeligmos apart, so they all cast shadows over approximately the same parts of the Earth.

Series members 6–27 occur between 1801 and 2200:
6	7	8
1810 Oct 12	1828 Oct 23	1846 Nov 03
9	10	11
1864 Nov 13	1882 Nov 25	1900 Dec 06
12	13	14
1918 Dec 17	1936 Dec 28	1955 Jan 08
15	16	17
1973 Jan 18	1991 Jan 30	2009 Feb 09
18	19	20
2027 Feb 20	2045 Mar 03	2063 Mar 14
21	22	23
2081 Mar 25	2099 Apr 05	2117 Apr 16
24	25	26
2135 Apr 28	2153 May 08	2171 May 19
27
2189 May 29

=== Tritos series ===
This eclipse is a part of a tritos cycle, repeating at alternating nodes every 135 synodic months (≈ 3986.63 days, or 11 years minus 1 month). Their appearance and longitude are irregular due to a lack of synchronization with the anomalistic month (period of perigee), but groupings of 3 tritos cycles (≈ 33 years minus 3 months) come close (≈ 434.044 anomalistic months), so eclipses are similar in these groupings.

Series members between 1801 and 2132
1805 Jul 11 (Saros 126)	1816 Jun 10 (Saros 127)	1827 May 11 (Saros 128)	1838 Apr 10 (Saros 129)	1849 Mar 09 (Saros 130)
1860 Feb 07 (Saros 131)	1871 Jan 06 (Saros 132)	1881 Dec 05 (Saros 133)	1892 Nov 04 (Saros 134)	1903 Oct 06 (Saros 135)
1914 Sep 04 (Saros 136)	1925 Aug 04 (Saros 137)	1936 Jul 04 (Saros 138)	1947 Jun 03 (Saros 139)	1958 May 03 (Saros 140)
1969 Apr 02 (Saros 141)	1980 Mar 01 (Saros 142)	1991 Jan 30 (Saros 143)	2001 Dec 30 (Saros 144)	2012 Nov 28 (Saros 145)
2023 Oct 28 (Saros 146)	2034 Sep 28 (Saros 147)	2045 Aug 27 (Saros 148)	2056 Jul 26 (Saros 149)	2067 Jun 27 (Saros 150)
2132 Dec 22 (Saros 156)

=== Inex series ===
This eclipse is a part of the long period inex cycle, repeating at alternating nodes, every 358 synodic months (≈ 10,571.95 days, or 29 years minus 20 days). Their appearance and longitude are irregular due to a lack of synchronization with the anomalistic month (period of perigee). However, groupings of 3 inex cycles (≈ 87 years minus 2 months) comes close (≈ 1,151.02 anomalistic months), so eclipses are similar in these groupings.

Series members between 1801 and 2200
1817 May 30 (Saros 137)	1846 May 11 (Saros 138)	1875 Apr 20 (Saros 139)
1904 Mar 31 (Saros 140)	1933 Mar 12 (Saros 141)	1962 Feb 19 (Saros 142)
1991 Jan 30 (Saros 143)	2020 Jan 10 (Saros 144)	2048 Dec 20 (Saros 145)
2077 Nov 29 (Saros 146)	2106 Nov 11 (Saros 147)	2135 Oct 22 (Saros 148)
2164 Sep 30 (Saros 149)	2193 Sep 11 (Saros 150)	

=== Half-Saros cycle ===
A lunar eclipse will be preceded and followed by solar eclipses by 9 years and 5.5 days (a half saros). This lunar eclipse is related to two partial solar eclipses of Solar Saros 150.

January 25, 1982	February 5, 2000

== See also ==
- List of lunar eclipses
- List of 20th-century lunar eclipses
