= December 1936 lunar eclipse =

Penumbral lunar eclipse December 28, 1936

- Penumbral eclipse
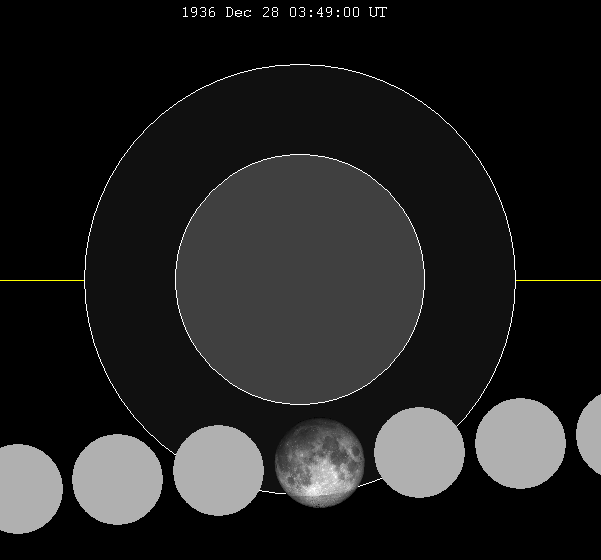
- The Moon's hourly motion shown right to left
- Date: December 28, 1936
- Gamma: −1.0971
- Magnitude: −0.1550
- Saros cycle: 143 (14 of 73)
- Penumbral: 235 minutes, 31 seconds
Contacts (UTC)
- P1: 1:50:57
- Greatest: 3:48:45
- P4: 5:46:28

A penumbral lunar eclipse occurred at the Moon’s descending node of orbit on Monday, December 28, 1936, with an umbral magnitude of −0.1550. A lunar eclipse occurs when the Moon moves into the Earth's shadow, causing the Moon to be darkened. A penumbral lunar eclipse occurs when part or all of the Moon's near side passes into the Earth's penumbra. Unlike a solar eclipse, which can only be viewed from a relatively small area of the world, a lunar eclipse may be viewed from anywhere on the night side of Earth. Occurring about 2.3 days after perigee (on December 25, 1936, at 20:45 UTC), the Moon's apparent diameter was larger.

== Visibility ==
The eclipse was completely visible over North and South America, west Africa, and Europe, seen rising over the central Pacific Ocean and setting over central Africa, east Africa, west Asia, and central Asia.

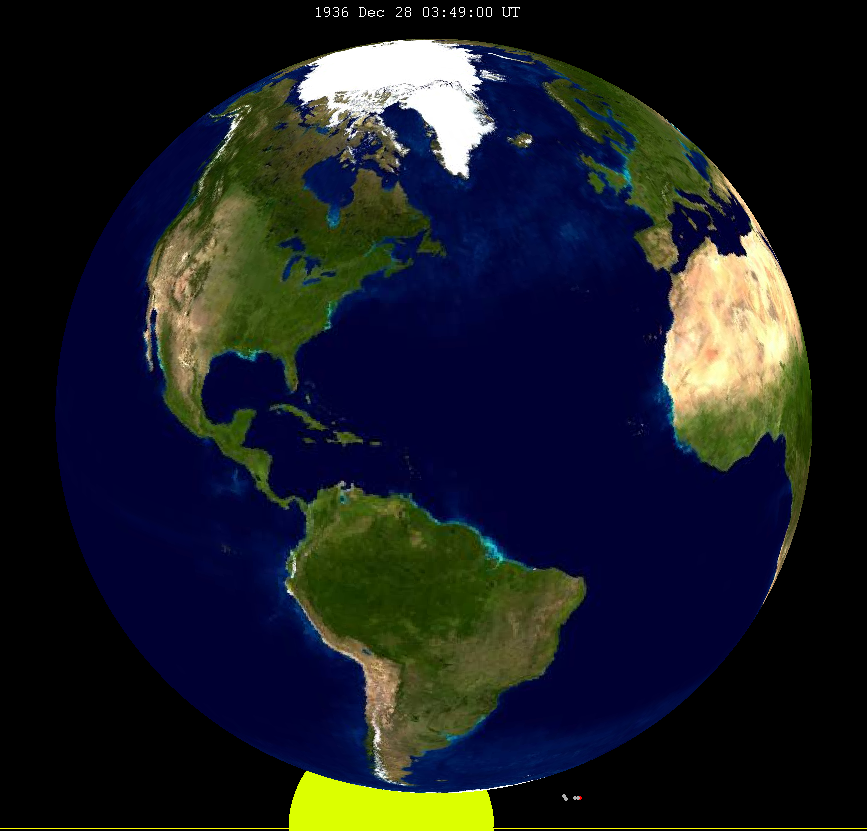
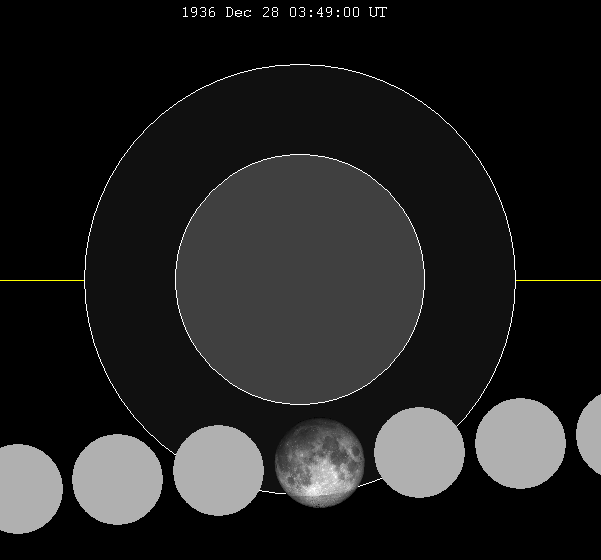

== Eclipse details ==
Shown below is a table displaying details about this particular lunar eclipse. It describes various parameters pertaining to this eclipse.

December 28, 1936 Lunar Eclipse Parameters
Parameter	Value
Penumbral Magnitude	0.84510
Umbral Magnitude	−0.15495
Gamma	−1.09705
Sun Right Ascension	18h27m15.3s
Sun Declination	-23°17'57.2"
Sun Semi-Diameter	16'16.0"
Sun Equatorial Horizontal Parallax	08.9"
Moon Right Ascension	06h26m34.6s
Moon Declination	+22°13'08.7"
Moon Semi-Diameter	16'15.9"
Moon Equatorial Horizontal Parallax	0°59'41.6"
ΔT	23.9 s

== Eclipse season ==
This eclipse is part of an eclipse season, a period, roughly every six months, when eclipses occur. Only two (or occasionally three) eclipse seasons occur each year, and each season lasts about 35 days and repeats just short of six months (173 days) later; thus two full eclipse seasons always occur each year. Either two or three eclipses happen each eclipse season. In the sequence below, each eclipse is separated by a fortnight.

Eclipse season of December 1936
December 13 Ascending node (new moon)	December 28 Descending node (full moon)
Annular solar eclipse Solar Saros 131	Penumbral lunar eclipse Lunar Saros 143

== Related eclipses ==
=== Eclipses in 1936 ===
- A total lunar eclipse on January 8.
- A total solar eclipse on June 19.
- A partial lunar eclipse on July 4.
- An annular solar eclipse on December 13.
- A penumbral lunar eclipse on December 28.

=== Metonic ===
- Preceded by: Lunar eclipse of March 12, 1933
- Followed by: Lunar eclipse of October 16, 1940

=== Tzolkinex ===
- Preceded by: Lunar eclipse of November 17, 1929
- Followed by: Lunar eclipse of February 9, 1944

=== Half-Saros ===
- Preceded by: Solar eclipse of December 24, 1927
- Followed by: Solar eclipse of January 3, 1946

=== Tritos ===
- Preceded by: Lunar eclipse of January 28, 1926
- Followed by: Lunar eclipse of November 28, 1947

=== Lunar Saros 143 ===
- Preceded by: Lunar eclipse of December 17, 1918
- Followed by: Lunar eclipse of January 8, 1955

=== Inex ===
- Preceded by: Lunar eclipse of January 18, 1908
- Followed by: Lunar eclipse of December 8, 1965

=== Triad ===
- Preceded by: Lunar eclipse of February 26, 1850
- Followed by: Lunar eclipse of October 28, 2023

=== Lunar eclipses of 1933–1936 ===
This eclipse is a member of a semester series. An eclipse in a semester series of lunar eclipses repeats approximately every 177 days and 4 hours (a semester) at alternating nodes of the Moon's orbit.

The penumbral lunar eclipses on March 12, 1933 and September 4, 1933 occur in the previous lunar year eclipse set.

Lunar eclipse series sets from 1933 to 1936
Descending node				Ascending node			
Saros	Date Viewing	Type Chart	Gamma	Saros	Date Viewing	Type Chart	Gamma
103	1933 Feb 10	Penumbral	1.5600	108	1933 Aug 05	Penumbral	−1.4216
113	1934 Jan 30	Partial	0.9258	118	1934 Jul 26	Partial	−0.6681
123	1935 Jan 19	Total	0.2498	128	1935 Jul 16	Total	0.0672
133	1936 Jan 08	Total	−0.4429	138	1936 Jul 04	Partial	0.8642
143	1936 Dec 28	Penumbral	−1.0971				

=== Saros 143 ===
This eclipse is a part of Saros series 143, repeating every 18 years, 11 days, and containing 72 events. The series started with a penumbral lunar eclipse on August 18, 1720. It contains partial eclipses from March 14, 2063 through June 21, 2225; total eclipses from July 2, 2243 through April 13, 2712; and a second set of partial eclipses from April 25, 2730 through July 9, 2856. The series ends at member 72 as a penumbral eclipse on October 5, 3000.

The longest duration of totality will be produced by member 36 at 99 minutes, 9 seconds on September 6, 2351. All eclipses in this series occur at the Moon’s descending node of orbit.

Greatest	First			
The greatest eclipse of the series will occur on 2351 Sep 06, lasting 99 minutes, 9 seconds.	Penumbral	Partial	Total	Central
The greatest eclipse of the series will occur on 2351 Sep 06, lasting 99 minutes, 9 seconds.	1720 Aug 18	2063 Mar 14	2243 Jul 02	2297 Aug 03
The greatest eclipse of the series will occur on 2351 Sep 06, lasting 99 minutes, 9 seconds.	Last			
The greatest eclipse of the series will occur on 2351 Sep 06, lasting 99 minutes, 9 seconds.	Central	Total	Partial	Penumbral
The greatest eclipse of the series will occur on 2351 Sep 06, lasting 99 minutes, 9 seconds.	2495 Dec 02	2712 Apr 13	2856 Jul 09	3000 Oct 05

Eclipses are tabulated in three columns; every third eclipse in the same column is one exeligmos apart, so they all cast shadows over approximately the same parts of the Earth.

Series members 6–27 occur between 1801 and 2200:
6	7	8
1810 Oct 12	1828 Oct 23	1846 Nov 03
9	10	11
1864 Nov 13	1882 Nov 25	1900 Dec 06
12	13	14
1918 Dec 17	1936 Dec 28	1955 Jan 08
15	16	17
1973 Jan 18	1991 Jan 30	2009 Feb 09
18	19	20
2027 Feb 20	2045 Mar 03	2063 Mar 14
21	22	23
2081 Mar 25	2099 Apr 05	2117 Apr 16
24	25	26
2135 Apr 28	2153 May 08	2171 May 19
27
2189 May 29

=== Tritos series ===
This eclipse is a part of a tritos cycle, repeating at alternating nodes every 135 synodic months (≈ 3986.63 days, or 11 years minus 1 month). Their appearance and longitude are irregular due to a lack of synchronization with the anomalistic month (period of perigee), but groupings of 3 tritos cycles (≈ 33 years minus 3 months) come close (≈ 434.044 anomalistic months), so eclipses are similar in these groupings.

Series members between 1801 and 2078
1806 Jan 05 (Saros 131)	1816 Dec 04 (Saros 132)	1827 Nov 03 (Saros 133)	1838 Oct 03 (Saros 134)	1849 Sep 02 (Saros 135)
1860 Aug 01 (Saros 136)	1871 Jul 02 (Saros 137)	1882 Jun 01 (Saros 138)	1893 Apr 30 (Saros 139)	1904 Mar 31 (Saros 140)
1915 Mar 01 (Saros 141)	1926 Jan 28 (Saros 142)	1936 Dec 28 (Saros 143)	1947 Nov 28 (Saros 144)	1958 Oct 27 (Saros 145)
1969 Sep 25 (Saros 146)	1980 Aug 26 (Saros 147)	1991 Jul 26 (Saros 148)	2002 Jun 24 (Saros 149)	2013 May 25 (Saros 150)
2078 Nov 19 (Saros 156)

=== Inex series ===
This eclipse is a part of the long period inex cycle, repeating at alternating nodes, every 358 synodic months (≈ 10,571.95 days, or 29 years minus 20 days). Their appearance and longitude are irregular due to a lack of synchronization with the anomalistic month (period of perigee). However, groupings of 3 inex cycles (≈ 87 years minus 2 months) comes close (≈ 1,151.02 anomalistic months), so eclipses are similar in these groupings.

Series members between 1801 and 2200
1821 Mar 18 (Saros 139)	1850 Feb 26 (Saros 140)	1879 Feb 07 (Saros 141)
1908 Jan 18 (Saros 142)	1936 Dec 28 (Saros 143)	1965 Dec 08 (Saros 144)
1994 Nov 18 (Saros 145)	2023 Oct 28 (Saros 146)	2052 Oct 08 (Saros 147)
2081 Sep 18 (Saros 148)	2110 Aug 29 (Saros 149)	2139 Aug 10 (Saros 150)
2168 Jul 20 (Saros 151)	2197 Jun 29 (Saros 152)	

=== Half-Saros cycle ===
A lunar eclipse will be preceded and followed by solar eclipses by 9 years and 5.5 days (a half saros). This lunar eclipse is related to two partial solar eclipses of Solar Saros 150.

December 24, 1927	January 3, 1946

== See also ==
- List of lunar eclipses
- List of 20th-century lunar eclipses
