= February 1944 lunar eclipse =

Penumbral lunar eclipse February 9, 1944

- Penumbral eclipse
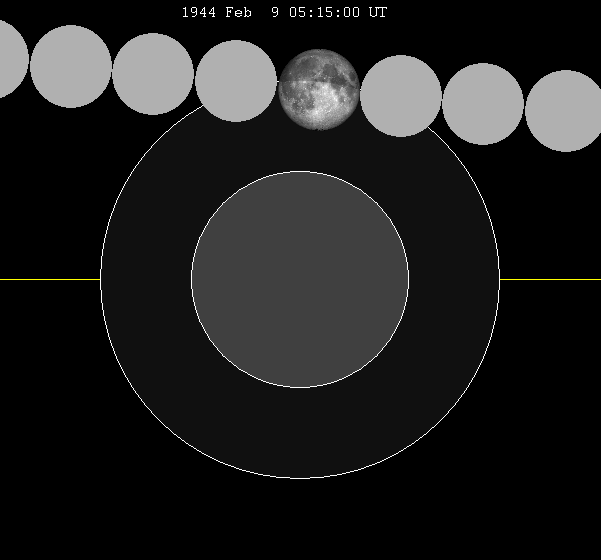
- The Moon's hourly motion shown right to left
- Date: February 9, 1944
- Gamma: 1.2698
- Magnitude: −0.5223
- Saros cycle: 142 (14 of 74)
- Penumbral: 226 minutes, 39 seconds
Contacts (UTC)
- P1: 3:21:09
- Greatest: 5:14:30
- P4: 7:07:48

A penumbral lunar eclipse occurred at the Moon's ascending node of orbit on Wednesday, February 9, 1944, with an umbral magnitude of −0.5223. A lunar eclipse occurs when the Moon moves into the Earth's shadow, causing the Moon to be darkened. A penumbral lunar eclipse occurs when part or all of the Moon's near side passes into the Earth's penumbra. Unlike a solar eclipse, which can only be viewed from a relatively small area of the world, a lunar eclipse may be viewed from anywhere on the night side of Earth. Occurring about 1.1 days before apogee (on February 10, 1944, at 7:45 UTC), the Moon's apparent diameter was smaller.

This eclipse was the first of four penumbral lunar eclipses in 1944, with the others occurring on July 6, August 4, and December 29.

== Visibility ==
The eclipse was completely visible over North and South America, west Africa, and western Europe, seen rising over northeast Asia and the central Pacific Ocean and setting over Africa, Europe, and the Middle East.

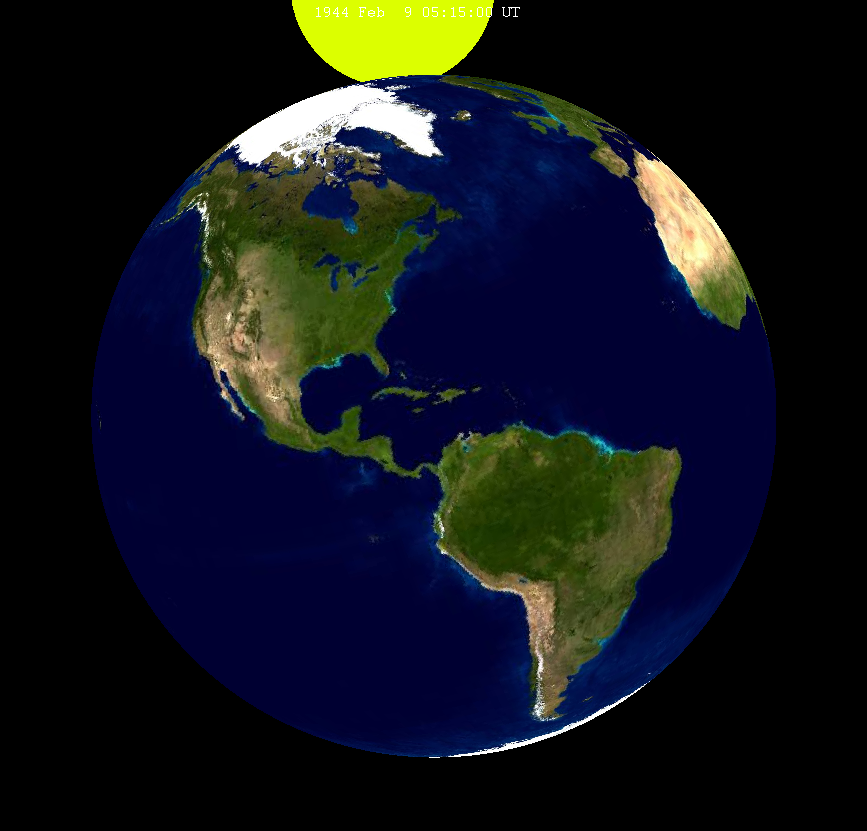
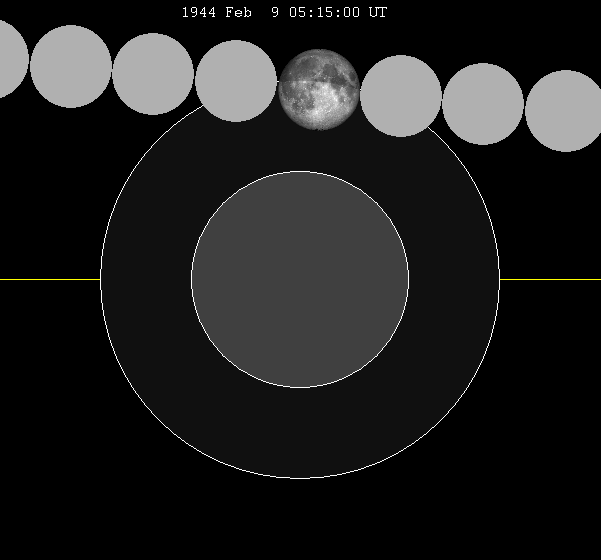

== Eclipse details ==
Shown below is a table displaying details about this particular solar eclipse. It describes various parameters pertaining to this eclipse.

February 9, 1944 Lunar Eclipse Parameters
Parameter	Value
Penumbral Magnitude	0.57926
Umbral Magnitude	−0.52225
Gamma	1.26983
Sun Right Ascension	21h27m03.0s
Sun Declination	-15°01'28.5"
Sun Semi-Diameter	16'12.7"
Sun Equatorial Horizontal Parallax	08.9"
Moon Right Ascension	09h28m05.2s
Moon Declination	+16°08'24.5"
Moon Semi-Diameter	14'43.1"
Moon Equatorial Horizontal Parallax	0°54'00.8"
ΔT	26.4 s

== Eclipse season ==
This eclipse is part of an eclipse season, a period, roughly every six months, when eclipses occur. Only two (or occasionally three) eclipse seasons occur each year, and each season lasts about 35 days and repeats just short of six months (173 days) later; thus two full eclipse seasons always occur each year. Either two or three eclipses happen each eclipse season. In the sequence below, each eclipse is separated by a fortnight.

Eclipse season of January–February 1944
January 25 Descending node (new moon)	February 9 Ascending node (full moon)
Total solar eclipse Solar Saros 130	Penumbral lunar eclipse Lunar Saros 142

== Related eclipses ==
=== Eclipses in 1944 ===
- A total solar eclipse on January 25.
- A penumbral lunar eclipse on February 9.
- A penumbral lunar eclipse on July 6.
- An annular solar eclipse on July 20.
- A penumbral lunar eclipse on August 4.
- A penumbral lunar eclipse on December 29.

=== Metonic ===
- Preceded by: Lunar eclipse of April 22, 1940
- Followed by: Lunar eclipse of November 28, 1947

=== Tzolkinex ===
- Preceded by: Lunar eclipse of December 28, 1936
- Followed by: Lunar eclipse of March 23, 1951

=== Half-Saros ===
- Preceded by: Solar eclipse of February 3, 1935
- Followed by: Solar eclipse of February 14, 1953

=== Tritos ===
- Preceded by: Lunar eclipse of March 12, 1933
- Followed by: Lunar eclipse of January 8, 1955

=== Lunar Saros 142 ===
- Preceded by: Lunar eclipse of January 28, 1926
- Followed by: Lunar eclipse of February 19, 1962

=== Inex ===
- Preceded by: Lunar eclipse of March 1, 1915
- Followed by: Lunar eclipse of January 18, 1973

=== Triad ===
- Preceded by: Lunar eclipse of April 9, 1857
- Followed by: Lunar eclipse of December 9, 2030

=== Lunar eclipses of 1940–1944 ===
This eclipse is a member of a semester series. An eclipse in a semester series of lunar eclipses repeats approximately every 177 days and 4 hours (a semester) at alternating nodes of the Moon's orbit.

The penumbral lunar eclipses on April 22, 1940 and October 16, 1940 occur in the previous lunar year eclipse set, and the penumbral lunar eclipses on July 6, 1944 and December 29, 1944 occur in the next lunar year eclipse set.

Lunar eclipse series sets from 1940 to 1944
Ascending node				Descending node			
Saros	Date Viewing	Type Chart	Gamma	Saros	Date Viewing	Type Chart	Gamma
102	1940 Mar 23	Penumbral	−1.5034	107			
112	1941 Mar 13	Partial	−0.8437	117	1941 Sep 05	Partial	0.9747
122	1942 Mar 03	Total	−0.1545	127	1942 Aug 26	Total	0.1818
132	1943 Feb 20	Partial	0.5752	137	1943 Aug 15	Partial	−0.5534
142	1944 Feb 09	Penumbral	1.2698	147	1944 Aug 04	Penumbral	−1.2843

=== Saros 142 ===
This eclipse is a part of Saros series 142, repeating every 18 years, 11 days, and containing 73 events. The series started with a penumbral lunar eclipse on September 19, 1709. It contains partial eclipses from May 5, 2088 through July 10, 2196; total eclipses from July 22, 2214 through April 21, 2665; and a second set of partial eclipses from May 3, 2683 through July 29, 2827. The series ends at member 73 as a penumbral eclipse on November 17, 3007.

The longest duration of totality will be produced by member 34 at 103 minutes, 54 seconds on September 15, 2304. All eclipses in this series occur at the Moon’s ascending node of orbit.

Greatest	First			
The greatest eclipse of the series will occur on 2304 Sep 15, lasting 103 minutes, 54 seconds.	Penumbral	Partial	Total	Central
The greatest eclipse of the series will occur on 2304 Sep 15, lasting 103 minutes, 54 seconds.	1709 Sep 19	2088 May 05	2214 Jul 22	2250 Aug 13
The greatest eclipse of the series will occur on 2304 Sep 15, lasting 103 minutes, 54 seconds.	Last			
The greatest eclipse of the series will occur on 2304 Sep 15, lasting 103 minutes, 54 seconds.	Central	Total	Partial	Penumbral
The greatest eclipse of the series will occur on 2304 Sep 15, lasting 103 minutes, 54 seconds.	2448 Dec 10	2665 Apr 21	2827 Jul 29	3007 Nov 17

Eclipses are tabulated in three columns; every third eclipse in the same column is one exeligmos apart, so they all cast shadows over approximately the same parts of the Earth.

Series members 7–28 occur between 1801 and 2200:
7	8	9
1817 Nov 23	1835 Dec 05	1853 Dec 15
10	11	12
1871 Dec 26	1890 Jan 06	1908 Jan 18
13	14	15
1926 Jan 28	1944 Feb 09	1962 Feb 19
16	17	18
1980 Mar 01	1998 Mar 13	2016 Mar 23
19	20	21
2034 Apr 03	2052 Apr 14	2070 Apr 25
22	23	24
2088 May 05	2106 May 17	2124 May 28
25	26	27
2142 Jun 08	2160 Jun 18	2178 Jun 30
28
2196 Jul 10

=== Tritos series ===
This eclipse is a part of a tritos cycle, repeating at alternating nodes every 135 synodic months (≈ 3986.63 days, or 11 years minus 1 month). Their appearance and longitude are irregular due to a lack of synchronization with the anomalistic month (period of perigee), but groupings of 3 tritos cycles (≈ 33 years minus 3 months) come close (≈ 434.044 anomalistic months), so eclipses are similar in these groupings.

Series members between 1801 and 2096
1802 Mar 19 (Saros 129)	1813 Feb 15 (Saros 130)	1824 Jan 16 (Saros 131)	1834 Dec 16 (Saros 132)	1845 Nov 14 (Saros 133)
1856 Oct 13 (Saros 134)	1867 Sep 14 (Saros 135)	1878 Aug 13 (Saros 136)	1889 Jul 12 (Saros 137)	1900 Jun 13 (Saros 138)
1911 May 13 (Saros 139)	1922 Apr 11 (Saros 140)	1933 Mar 12 (Saros 141)	1944 Feb 09 (Saros 142)	1955 Jan 08 (Saros 143)
1965 Dec 08 (Saros 144)	1976 Nov 06 (Saros 145)	1987 Oct 07 (Saros 146)	1998 Sep 06 (Saros 147)	2009 Aug 06 (Saros 148)
2020 Jul 05 (Saros 149)	2031 Jun 05 (Saros 150)			
		2096 Nov 29 (Saros 156)		

=== Inex series ===
This eclipse is a part of the long period inex cycle, repeating at alternating nodes, every 358 synodic months (≈ 10,571.95 days, or 29 years minus 20 days). Their appearance and longitude are irregular due to a lack of synchronization with the anomalistic month (period of perigee). However, groupings of 3 inex cycles (≈ 87 years minus 2 months) comes close (≈ 1,151.02 anomalistic months), so eclipses are similar in these groupings.

Series members between 1801 and 2200
1828 Apr 29 (Saros 138)	1857 Apr 09 (Saros 139)	1886 Mar 20 (Saros 140)
1915 Mar 01 (Saros 141)	1944 Feb 09 (Saros 142)	1973 Jan 18 (Saros 143)
2001 Dec 30 (Saros 144)	2030 Dec 09 (Saros 145)	2059 Nov 19 (Saros 146)
2088 Oct 30 (Saros 147)	2117 Oct 10 (Saros 148)	2146 Sep 20 (Saros 149)
2175 Aug 31 (Saros 150)

=== Half-Saros cycle ===
A lunar eclipse will be preceded and followed by solar eclipses by 9 years and 5.5 days (a half saros). This lunar eclipse is related to two total solar eclipses of Solar Saros 149.

February 3, 1935	February 14, 1953

== See also ==
- List of lunar eclipses and List of 21st-century lunar eclipses
