= February 1962 lunar eclipse =

Penumbral lunar eclipse February 19, 1962

- Penumbral eclipse
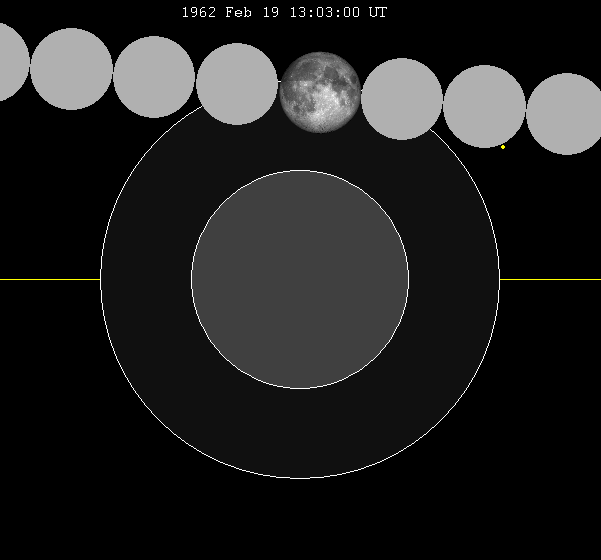
- The Moon's hourly motion shown right to left
- Date: February 19, 1962
- Gamma: 1.2512
- Magnitude: −0.4865
- Saros cycle: 142 (15 of 74)
- Penumbral: 231 minutes, 56 seconds
Contacts (UTC)
- P1: 11:07:08
- Greatest: 13:03:08
- P4: 14:59:04

A penumbral lunar eclipse occurred at the Moon’s ascending node of orbit on Monday, February 19, 1962, with an umbral magnitude of −0.4865. A lunar eclipse occurs when the Moon moves into the Earth's shadow, causing the Moon to be darkened. A penumbral lunar eclipse occurs when part or all of the Moon's near side passes into the Earth's penumbra. Unlike a solar eclipse, which can only be viewed from a relatively small area of the world, a lunar eclipse may be viewed from anywhere on the night side of Earth. Occurring about 1.3 days before apogee (on February 20, 1962, at 20:50 UTC), the Moon's apparent diameter was smaller.

== Visibility ==
The eclipse was completely visible over east and northeast Asia, Australia, and northwestern North America, seen rising over the western half of Asia and setting over much of North America.

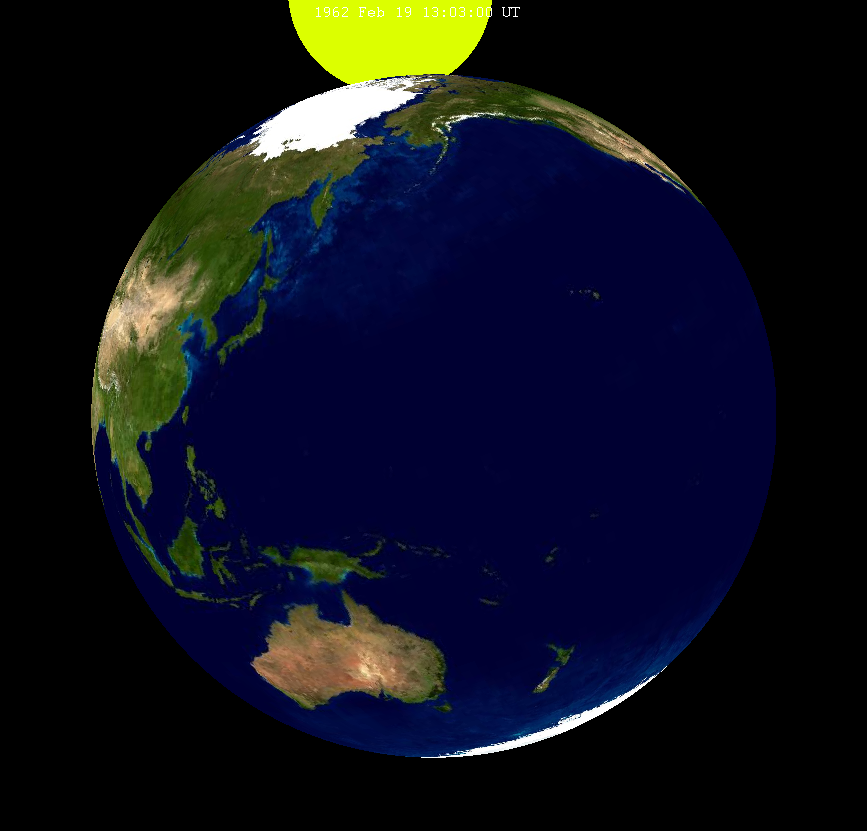
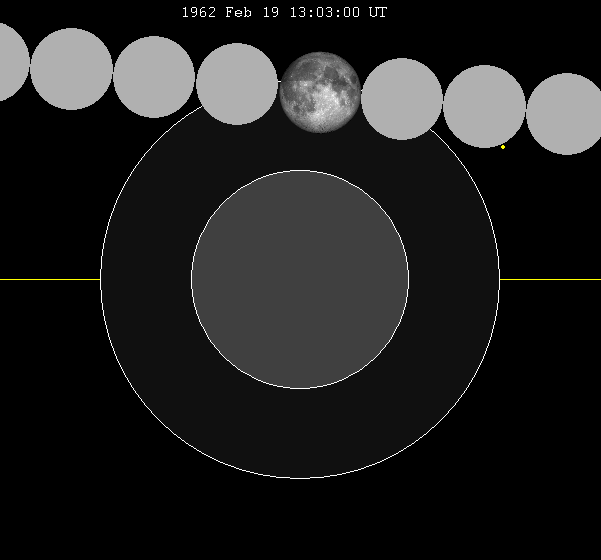

== Eclipse details ==
Shown below is a table displaying details about this particular solar eclipse. It describes various parameters pertaining to this eclipse.

February 19, 1962 Lunar Eclipse Parameters
Parameter	Value
Penumbral Magnitude	0.61204
Umbral Magnitude	−0.48649
Gamma	1.25115
Sun Right Ascension	22h09m56.0s
Sun Declination	-11°19'41.9"
Sun Semi-Diameter	16'10.7"
Sun Equatorial Horizontal Parallax	08.9"
Moon Right Ascension	10h11m07.8s
Moon Declination	+12°24'59.8"
Moon Semi-Diameter	14'43.6"
Moon Equatorial Horizontal Parallax	0°54'02.8"
ΔT	34.1 s

== Eclipse season ==
This eclipse is part of an eclipse season, a period, roughly every six months, when eclipses occur. Only two (or occasionally three) eclipse seasons occur each year, and each season lasts about 35 days and repeats just short of six months (173 days) later; thus two full eclipse seasons always occur each year. Either two or three eclipses happen each eclipse season. In the sequence below, each eclipse is separated by a fortnight.

Eclipse season of February 1962
February 5 Descending node (new moon)	February 19 Ascending node (full moon)
Total solar eclipse Solar Saros 130	Penumbral lunar eclipse Lunar Saros 142

== Related eclipses ==
=== Eclipses in 1962 ===
- A total solar eclipse on February 5.
- A penumbral lunar eclipse on February 19.
- A penumbral lunar eclipse on July 17.
- An annular solar eclipse on July 31.
- A penumbral lunar eclipse on August 15.

=== Metonic ===
- Preceded by: Lunar eclipse of May 3, 1958
- Followed by: Lunar eclipse of December 8, 1965

=== Tzolkinex ===
- Preceded by: Lunar eclipse of January 8, 1955
- Followed by: Lunar eclipse of April 2, 1969

=== Half-Saros ===
- Preceded by: Solar eclipse of February 14, 1953
- Followed by: Solar eclipse of February 25, 1971

=== Tritos ===
- Preceded by: Lunar eclipse of March 23, 1951
- Followed by: Lunar eclipse of January 18, 1973

=== Lunar Saros 142 ===
- Preceded by: Lunar eclipse of February 9, 1944
- Followed by: Lunar eclipse of March 1, 1980

=== Inex ===
- Preceded by: Lunar eclipse of March 12, 1933
- Followed by: Lunar eclipse of January 30, 1991

=== Triad ===
- Preceded by: Lunar eclipse of April 20, 1875
- Followed by: Lunar eclipse of December 20, 2048

=== Lunar eclipses of 1958–1962 ===
This eclipse is a member of a semester series. An eclipse in a semester series of lunar eclipses repeats approximately every 177 days and 4 hours (a semester) at alternating nodes of the Moon's orbit.

The lunar eclipses on May 3, 1958 (partial) and October 28, 1958 (penumbral) occur in the previous lunar year eclipse set, and the penumbral lunar eclipse on July 17, 1962 occurs in the next lunar year eclipse set.

Lunar eclipse series sets from 1958 to 1962
Ascending node				Descending node			
Saros	Date Viewing	Type Chart	Gamma	Saros	Date Viewing	Type Chart	Gamma
102	1958 Apr 04	Penumbral	−1.5381				
112	1959 Mar 24	Partial	−0.8757	117	1959 Sep 17	Penumbral	1.0296
122	1960 Mar 13	Total	−0.1799	127	1960 Sep 05	Total	0.2422
132	1961 Mar 02	Partial	0.5541	137	1961 Aug 26	Partial	−0.4895
142	1962 Feb 19	Penumbral	1.2512	147	1962 Aug 15	Penumbral	−1.2210

=== Saros 142 ===
This eclipse is a part of Saros series 142, repeating every 18 years, 11 days, and containing 73 events. The series started with a penumbral lunar eclipse on September 19, 1709. It contains partial eclipses from May 5, 2088 through July 10, 2196; total eclipses from July 22, 2214 through April 21, 2665; and a second set of partial eclipses from May 3, 2683 through July 29, 2827. The series ends at member 73 as a penumbral eclipse on November 17, 3007.

The longest duration of totality will be produced by member 34 at 103 minutes, 54 seconds on September 15, 2304. All eclipses in this series occur at the Moon’s ascending node of orbit.

Greatest	First			
The greatest eclipse of the series will occur on 2304 Sep 15, lasting 103 minutes, 54 seconds.	Penumbral	Partial	Total	Central
The greatest eclipse of the series will occur on 2304 Sep 15, lasting 103 minutes, 54 seconds.	1709 Sep 19	2088 May 05	2214 Jul 22	2250 Aug 13
The greatest eclipse of the series will occur on 2304 Sep 15, lasting 103 minutes, 54 seconds.	Last			
The greatest eclipse of the series will occur on 2304 Sep 15, lasting 103 minutes, 54 seconds.	Central	Total	Partial	Penumbral
The greatest eclipse of the series will occur on 2304 Sep 15, lasting 103 minutes, 54 seconds.	2448 Dec 10	2665 Apr 21	2827 Jul 29	3007 Nov 17

Eclipses are tabulated in three columns; every third eclipse in the same column is one exeligmos apart, so they all cast shadows over approximately the same parts of the Earth.

Series members 7–28 occur between 1801 and 2200:
7	8	9
1817 Nov 23	1835 Dec 05	1853 Dec 15
10	11	12
1871 Dec 26	1890 Jan 06	1908 Jan 18
13	14	15
1926 Jan 28	1944 Feb 09	1962 Feb 19
16	17	18
1980 Mar 01	1998 Mar 13	2016 Mar 23
19	20	21
2034 Apr 03	2052 Apr 14	2070 Apr 25
22	23	24
2088 May 05	2106 May 17	2124 May 28
25	26	27
2142 Jun 08	2160 Jun 18	2178 Jun 30
28
2196 Jul 10

=== Tritos series ===
This eclipse is a part of a tritos cycle, repeating at alternating nodes every 135 synodic months (≈ 3986.63 days, or 11 years minus 1 month). Their appearance and longitude are irregular due to a lack of synchronization with the anomalistic month (period of perigee), but groupings of 3 tritos cycles (≈ 33 years minus 3 months) come close (≈ 434.044 anomalistic months), so eclipses are similar in these groupings.

Series members between 1801 and 2147
1809 Apr 30 (Saros 128)	1820 Mar 29 (Saros 129)	1831 Feb 26 (Saros 130)	1842 Jan 26 (Saros 131)	1852 Dec 26 (Saros 132)
1863 Nov 25 (Saros 133)	1874 Oct 25 (Saros 134)	1885 Sep 24 (Saros 135)	1896 Aug 23 (Saros 136)	1907 Jul 25 (Saros 137)
1918 Jun 24 (Saros 138)	1929 May 23 (Saros 139)	1940 Apr 22 (Saros 140)	1951 Mar 23 (Saros 141)	1962 Feb 19 (Saros 142)
1973 Jan 18 (Saros 143)	1983 Dec 20 (Saros 144)	1994 Nov 18 (Saros 145)	2005 Oct 17 (Saros 146)	2016 Sep 16 (Saros 147)
2027 Aug 17 (Saros 148)	2038 Jul 16 (Saros 149)	2049 Jun 15 (Saros 150)		
			2114 Dec 12 (Saros 156)	
	2147 Sep 09 (Saros 159)			

=== Inex series ===
This eclipse is a part of the long period inex cycle, repeating at alternating nodes, every 358 synodic months (≈ 10,571.95 days, or 29 years minus 20 days). Their appearance and longitude are irregular due to a lack of synchronization with the anomalistic month (period of perigee). However, groupings of 3 inex cycles (≈ 87 years minus 2 months) comes close (≈ 1,151.02 anomalistic months), so eclipses are similar in these groupings.

Series members between 1801 and 2200
1817 May 30 (Saros 137)	1846 May 11 (Saros 138)	1875 Apr 20 (Saros 139)
1904 Mar 31 (Saros 140)	1933 Mar 12 (Saros 141)	1962 Feb 19 (Saros 142)
1991 Jan 30 (Saros 143)	2020 Jan 10 (Saros 144)	2048 Dec 20 (Saros 145)
2077 Nov 29 (Saros 146)	2106 Nov 11 (Saros 147)	2135 Oct 22 (Saros 148)
2164 Sep 30 (Saros 149)	2193 Sep 11 (Saros 150)	

=== Half-Saros cycle ===
A lunar eclipse will be preceded and followed by solar eclipses by 9 years and 5.5 days (a half saros). This lunar eclipse is related to two total solar eclipses of Solar Saros 149.

February 14, 1953	February 25, 1971

== See also ==
- List of lunar eclipses
- List of 20th-century lunar eclipses
