= April 2052 lunar eclipse =

Astronomical event

- Penumbral eclipse
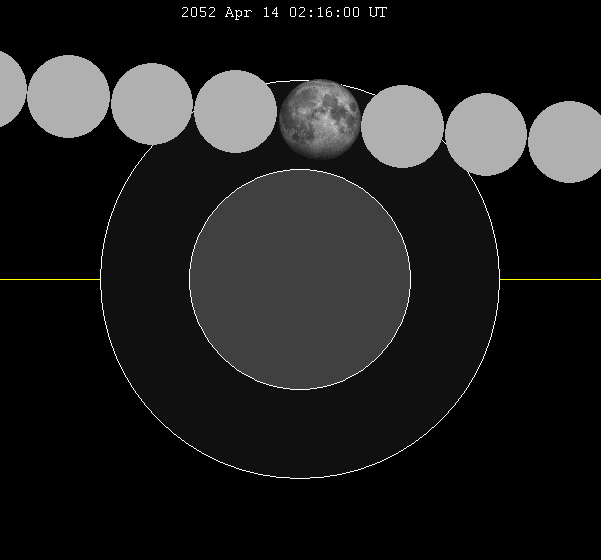
- The Moon's hourly motion shown right to left
- Date: April 14, 2052
- Gamma: 1.0628
- Magnitude: −0.1294
- Saros cycle: 142 (20 of 73)
- Penumbral: 276 minutes, 0 seconds
Contacts (UTC)
- P1: 23:58:26
- Greatest: 2:16:28
- P4: 4:34:26

A penumbral lunar eclipse will occur at the Moon’s ascending node of orbit on Sunday, April 14, 2052, with an umbral magnitude of −0.1294. A lunar eclipse occurs when the Moon moves into the Earth's shadow, causing the Moon to be darkened. A penumbral lunar eclipse occurs when part or all of the Moon's near side passes into the Earth's penumbra. Unlike a solar eclipse, which can only be viewed from a relatively small area of the world, a lunar eclipse may be viewed from anywhere on the night side of Earth. Occurring about 2.4 days before apogee (on April 16, 2052, at 13:00 UTC), the Moon's apparent diameter will be smaller.

== Visibility ==
The eclipse will be completely visible over eastern North America, South America, western Europe, and west Africa, seen rising over western and central North America and setting over east Africa, eastern Europe, and west, central, and south Asia.

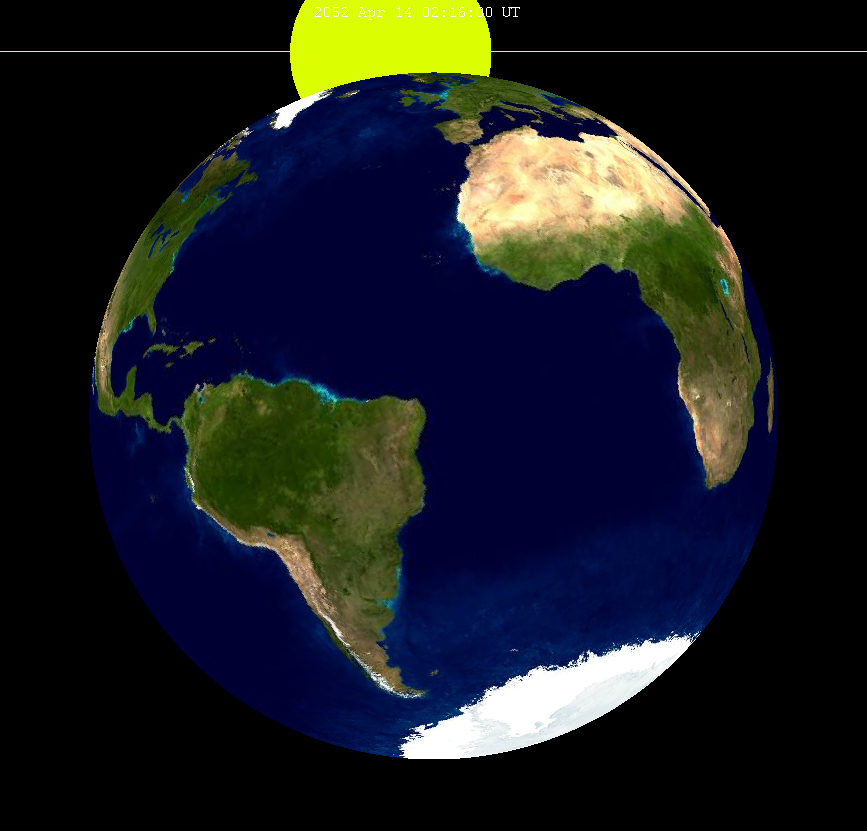
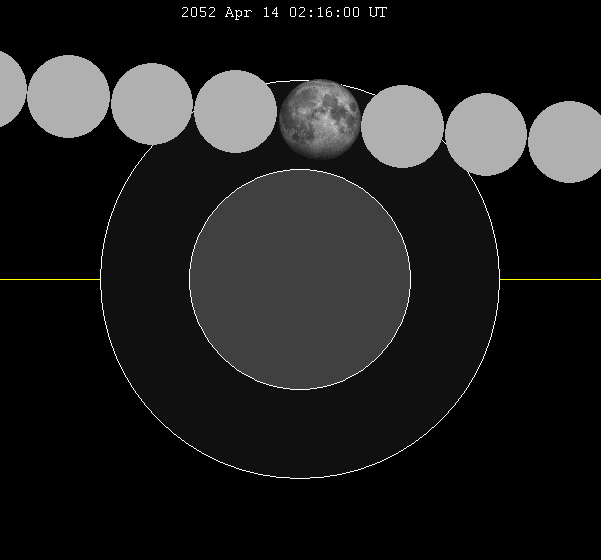

== Eclipse details ==
Shown below is a table displaying details about this particular solar eclipse. It describes various parameters pertaining to this eclipse.

April 14, 2052 Lunar Eclipse Parameters
Parameter	Value
Penumbral Magnitude	0.94777
Umbral Magnitude	−0.12938
Gamma	1.06290
Sun Right Ascension	01h32m05.6s
Sun Declination	+09°37'10.9"
Sun Semi-Diameter	15'56.9"
Sun Equatorial Horizontal Parallax	08.8"
Moon Right Ascension	13h33m09.3s
Moon Declination	-08°41'36.6"
Moon Semi-Diameter	14'48.3"
Moon Equatorial Horizontal Parallax	0°54'20.2"
ΔT	86.6 s

== Eclipse season ==
This eclipse is part of an eclipse season, a period, roughly every six months, when eclipses occur. Only two (or occasionally three) eclipse seasons occur each year, and each season lasts about 35 days and repeats just short of six months (173 days) later; thus two full eclipse seasons always occur each year. Either two or three eclipses happen each eclipse season. In the sequence below, each eclipse is separated by a fortnight.

Eclipse season of March–April 2052
March 30 Descending node (new moon)	April 14 Ascending node (full moon)
Total solar eclipse Solar Saros 130	Penumbral lunar eclipse Lunar Saros 142

== Related eclipses ==
=== Eclipses in 2052 ===
- A total solar eclipse on March 30.
- A penumbral lunar eclipse on April 14.
- An annular solar eclipse on September 22.
- A partial lunar eclipse on October 8.

=== Metonic ===
- Preceded by: Lunar eclipse of June 26, 2048
- Followed by: Lunar eclipse of February 1, 2056

=== Tzolkinex ===
- Preceded by: Lunar eclipse of March 3, 2045
- Followed by: Lunar eclipse of May 27, 2059

=== Half-Saros ===
- Preceded by: Solar eclipse of April 9, 2043
- Followed by: Solar eclipse of April 20, 2061

=== Tritos ===
- Preceded by: Lunar eclipse of May 16, 2041
- Followed by: Lunar eclipse of March 14, 2063

=== Lunar Saros 142 ===
- Preceded by: Lunar eclipse of April 3, 2034
- Followed by: Lunar eclipse of April 25, 2070

=== Inex ===
- Preceded by: Lunar eclipse of May 5, 2023
- Followed by: Lunar eclipse of March 25, 2081

=== Triad ===
- Preceded by: Lunar eclipse of June 14, 1965
- Followed by: Lunar eclipse of February 13, 2139

=== Lunar eclipses of 2049–2052 ===
This eclipse is a member of a semester series. An eclipse in a semester series of lunar eclipses repeats approximately every 177 days and 4 hours (a semester) at alternating nodes of the Moon's orbit.

The penumbral lunar eclipse on June 15, 2049 occurs in the previous lunar year eclipse set.

Lunar eclipse series sets from 2049 to 2052
Ascending node				Descending node			
Saros	Date Viewing	Type Chart	Gamma	Saros	Date Viewing	Type Chart	Gamma
112	2049 May 17	Penumbral	−1.1337	117	2049 Nov 09	Penumbral	1.1964
122	2050 May 06	Total	−0.4181	127	2050 Oct 30	Total	0.4435
132	2051 Apr 26	Total	0.3371	137	2051 Oct 19	Total	−0.2542
142	2052 Apr 14	Penumbral	1.0628	147	2052 Oct 08	Partial	−0.9726

=== Saros 142 ===
This eclipse is a part of Saros series 142, repeating every 18 years, 11 days, and containing 73 events. The series started with a penumbral lunar eclipse on September 19, 1709. It contains partial eclipses from May 5, 2088 through July 10, 2196; total eclipses from July 22, 2214 through April 21, 2665; and a second set of partial eclipses from May 3, 2683 through July 29, 2827. The series ends at member 73 as a penumbral eclipse on November 17, 3007.

The longest duration of totality will be produced by member 34 at 103 minutes, 54 seconds on September 15, 2304. All eclipses in this series occur at the Moon’s ascending node of orbit.

Greatest	First			
The greatest eclipse of the series will occur on 2304 Sep 15, lasting 103 minutes, 54 seconds.	Penumbral	Partial	Total	Central
The greatest eclipse of the series will occur on 2304 Sep 15, lasting 103 minutes, 54 seconds.	1709 Sep 19	2088 May 05	2214 Jul 22	2250 Aug 13
The greatest eclipse of the series will occur on 2304 Sep 15, lasting 103 minutes, 54 seconds.	Last			
The greatest eclipse of the series will occur on 2304 Sep 15, lasting 103 minutes, 54 seconds.	Central	Total	Partial	Penumbral
The greatest eclipse of the series will occur on 2304 Sep 15, lasting 103 minutes, 54 seconds.	2448 Dec 10	2665 Apr 21	2827 Jul 29	3007 Nov 17

Eclipses are tabulated in three columns; every third eclipse in the same column is one exeligmos apart, so they all cast shadows over approximately the same parts of the Earth.

Series members 7–28 occur between 1801 and 2200:
7	8	9
1817 Nov 23	1835 Dec 05	1853 Dec 15
10	11	12
1871 Dec 26	1890 Jan 06	1908 Jan 18
13	14	15
1926 Jan 28	1944 Feb 09	1962 Feb 19
16	17	18
1980 Mar 01	1998 Mar 13	2016 Mar 23
19	20	21
2034 Apr 03	2052 Apr 14	2070 Apr 25
22	23	24
2088 May 05	2106 May 17	2124 May 28
25	26	27
2142 Jun 08	2160 Jun 18	2178 Jun 30
28
2196 Jul 10

=== Tritos series ===
This eclipse is a part of a tritos cycle, repeating at alternating nodes every 135 synodic months (≈ 3986.63 days, or 11 years minus 1 month). Their appearance and longitude are irregular due to a lack of synchronization with the anomalistic month (period of perigee), but groupings of 3 tritos cycles (≈ 33 years minus 3 months) come close (≈ 434.044 anomalistic months), so eclipses are similar in these groupings.

Series members between 1801 and 2200
1801 Mar 30 (Saros 119)	1812 Feb 27 (Saros 120)	1823 Jan 26 (Saros 121)	1833 Dec 26 (Saros 122)	1844 Nov 24 (Saros 123)
1855 Oct 25 (Saros 124)	1866 Sep 24 (Saros 125)	1877 Aug 23 (Saros 126)	1888 Jul 23 (Saros 127)	1899 Jun 23 (Saros 128)
1910 May 24 (Saros 129)	1921 Apr 22 (Saros 130)	1932 Mar 22 (Saros 131)	1943 Feb 20 (Saros 132)	1954 Jan 19 (Saros 133)
1964 Dec 19 (Saros 134)	1975 Nov 18 (Saros 135)	1986 Oct 17 (Saros 136)	1997 Sep 16 (Saros 137)	2008 Aug 16 (Saros 138)
2019 Jul 16 (Saros 139)	2030 Jun 15 (Saros 140)	2041 May 16 (Saros 141)	2052 Apr 14 (Saros 142)	2063 Mar 14 (Saros 143)
2074 Feb 11 (Saros 144)	2085 Jan 10 (Saros 145)	2095 Dec 11 (Saros 146)	2106 Nov 11 (Saros 147)	2117 Oct 10 (Saros 148)
2128 Sep 09 (Saros 149)	2139 Aug 10 (Saros 150)	2150 Jul 09 (Saros 151)	2161 Jun 08 (Saros 152)	2172 May 08 (Saros 153)
	2194 Mar 07 (Saros 155)			

=== Inex series ===
This eclipse is a part of the long period inex cycle, repeating at alternating nodes, every 358 synodic months (≈ 10,571.95 days, or 29 years minus 20 days). Their appearance and longitude are irregular due to a lack of synchronization with the anomalistic month (period of perigee). However, groupings of 3 inex cycles (≈ 87 years minus 2 months) comes close (≈ 1,151.02 anomalistic months), so eclipses are similar in these groupings.

Series members between 1801 and 2200
1820 Sep 22 (Saros 134)	1849 Sep 02 (Saros 135)	1878 Aug 13 (Saros 136)
1907 Jul 25 (Saros 137)	1936 Jul 04 (Saros 138)	1965 Jun 14 (Saros 139)
1994 May 25 (Saros 140)	2023 May 05 (Saros 141)	2052 Apr 14 (Saros 142)
2081 Mar 25 (Saros 143)	2110 Mar 06 (Saros 144)	2139 Feb 13 (Saros 145)
2168 Jan 24 (Saros 146)	2197 Jan 04 (Saros 147)	

=== Half-Saros cycle ===
A lunar eclipse will be preceded and followed by solar eclipses by 9 years and 5.5 days (a half saros). This lunar eclipse is related to two total solar eclipses of Solar Saros 149.

April 9, 2043	April 20, 2061

== See also ==
- List of lunar eclipses and List of 21st-century lunar eclipses
