= Lunar Saros 142 =

Series of lunar eclipses

Saros cycle series 142 for lunar eclipses occurs at the moon's ascending node, 18 years 11 and 1/3 days. It contains 73 events.

| Cat. | Saros | Mem | Date | Time UT (hr:mn) | Type | Gamma | Magnitude | Duration (min) | | | Contacts UT (hr:mn) | | | | | | Chart |
| Cat. | Saros | Mem | Date | Greatest | Type | Gamma | Magnitude | Pen. | Par. | Tot. | P1 | P4 | U1 | U2 | U3 | U4 | Chart |
|---|---|---|---|---|---|---|---|---|---|---|---|---|---|---|---|---|---|
| 08940 | 142 | 1 | 1709 Sep 19 | 0:30:48 | Penumbral | 1.5439 | -1.0136 | 78.2 | | | 23:51:42 | 1:09:54 | | | | | |
| 08987 | 142 | 2 | 1727 Sep 30 | 7:40:13 | Penumbral | 1.4949 | -0.9259 | 121.5 | | | 6:39:28 | 8:40:58 | | | | | |
| 09033 | 142 | 3 | 1745 Oct 10 | 14:56:57 | Penumbral | 1.4515 | -0.8485 | 149.2 | | | 13:42:21 | 16:11:33 | | | | | |
| 09080 | 142 | 4 | 1763 Oct 21 | 22:22:45 | Penumbral | 1.4153 | -0.7842 | 168.6 | | | 20:58:27 | 23:47:03 | | | | | |
| 09125 | 142 | 5 | 1781 Nov 01 | 5:56:11 | Penumbral | 1.3850 | -0.7308 | 183.0 | | | 4:24:41 | 7:27:41 | | | | | |
| 09170 | 142 | 6 | 1799 Nov 12 | 13:38:20 | Penumbral | 1.3618 | -0.6897 | 193.4 | | | 12:01:38 | 15:15:02 | | | | | |
| 09215 | 142 | 7 | 1817 Nov 23 | 21:26:57 | Penumbral | 1.3435 | -0.6577 | 201.1 | | | 19:46:24 | 23:07:30 | | | | | |
| 09261 | 142 | 8 | 1835 Dec 05 | 5:20:19 | Penumbral | 1.3290 | -0.6322 | 206.9 | | | 3:36:52 | 7:03:46 | | | | | |
| 09307 | 142 | 9 | 1853 Dec 15 | 13:18:43 | Penumbral | 1.3186 | -0.6138 | 211.0 | | | 11:33:13 | 15:04:13 | | | | | |
| 09351 | 142 | 10 | 1871 Dec 26 | 21:19:33 | Penumbral | 1.3105 | -0.5995 | 213.9 | | | 19:32:36 | 23:06:30 | | | | | |
| 09394 | 142 | 11 | 1890 Jan 06 | 5:21:26 | Penumbral | 1.3029 | -0.5854 | 216.6 | | | 3:33:08 | 7:09:44 | | | | | |
| 09437 | 142 | 12 | 1908 Jan 18 | 13:21:36 | Penumbral | 1.2939 | -0.5685 | 219.5 | | | 11:31:51 | 15:11:21 | | | | | |
| 09479 | 142 | 13 | 1926 Jan 28 | 21:20:24 | Penumbral | 1.2836 | -0.5488 | 222.6 | | | 19:29:06 | 23:11:42 | | | | | |
| 09521 | 142 | 14 | 1944 Feb 09 | 5:14:57 | Penumbral | 1.2698 | -0.5223 | 226.7 | | | 3:21:36 | 7:08:18 | | | | | |
| 09562 | 142 | 15 | 1962 Feb 19 | 13:03:42 | Penumbral | 1.2511 | -0.4865 | 231.9 | | | 11:07:45 | 14:59:39 | | | | | |
| 09603 | 142 | 16 | 1980 Mar 01 | 20:46:03 | Penumbral | 1.2269 | -0.4405 | 238.5 | | | 18:46:48 | 22:45:18 | | | | | |
| 09644 | 142 | 17 | 1998 Mar 13 | 4:21:08 | Penumbral | 1.1964 | -0.3824 | 246.4 | | | 2:17:56 | 6:24:20 | | | | | |
| 09686 | 142 | 18 | 2016 Mar 23 | 11:48:21 | Penumbral | 1.1591 | -0.3118 | 255.4 | | | 9:40:39 | 13:56:03 | | | | | |
| 09727 | 142 | 19 | 2034 Apr 03 | 19:06:59 | Penumbral | 1.1144 | -0.2274 | 265.4 | | | 16:54:17 | 21:19:41 | | | | | |
| 09767 | 142 | 20 | 2052 Apr 14 | 2:18:06 | Penumbral | 1.0628 | -0.1305 | 276.0 | | | 0:00:06 | 4:36:06 | | | | | |
| 09808 | 142 | 21 | 2070 Apr 25 | 9:21:24 | Penumbral | 1.0044 | -0.0209 | 286.9 | | | 6:57:57 | 11:44:51 | | | | | |
| 09849 | 142 | 22 | 2088 May 05 | 16:16:50 | Partial | 0.9387 | 0.1019 | 297.9 | 77.1 | | 13:47:53 | 18:45:47 | 15:38:17 | | | 16:55:23 | |
| 09891 | 142 | 23 | 2106 May 17 | 23:06:43 | Partial | 0.8677 | 0.2345 | 308.4 | 114.5 | | 20:32:31 | 1:40:55 | 22:09:28 | | | 0:03:58 | |
| 09933 | 142 | 24 | 2124 May 28 | 5:50:59 | Partial | 0.7913 | 0.3770 | 318.4 | 141.9 | | 3:11:47 | 8:30:11 | 4:40:02 | | | 7:01:56 | |
| 09976 | 142 | 25 | 2142 Jun 08 | 12:32:42 | Partial | 0.7118 | 0.5247 | 327.2 | 163.2 | | 9:49:06 | 15:16:18 | 11:11:06 | | | 13:54:18 | |
| 10020 | 142 | 26 | 2160 Jun 18 | 19:10:10 | Partial | 0.6280 | 0.6804 | 335.2 | 180.8 | | 16:22:34 | 21:57:46 | 17:39:46 | | | 20:40:34 | |
| 10063 | 142 | 27 | 2178 Jun 30 | 1:48:39 | Partial | 0.5438 | 0.8364 | 341.8 | 194.6 | | 22:57:45 | 4:39:33 | 0:11:21 | | | 3:25:57 | |
| 10106 | 142 | 28 | 2196 Jul 10 | 8:26:05 | Partial | 0.4577 | 0.9960 | 347.3 | 205.8 | | 5:32:26 | 11:19:44 | 6:43:11 | | | 10:08:59 | |
| 10150 | 142 | 29 | 2214 Jul 22 | 15:06:54 | Total | 0.3734 | 1.1518 | 351.4 | 214.2 | 60.4 | 12:11:12 | 18:02:36 | 13:19:48 | 14:36:42 | 15:37:06 | 16:54:00 | |
| 10194 | 142 | 30 | 2232 Aug 01 | 21:49:49 | Total | 0.2898 | 1.3061 | 354.3 | 220.4 | 81.1 | 18:52:40 | 0:46:58 | 19:59:37 | 21:09:16 | 22:30:22 | 23:40:01 | |
| 10240 | 142 | 31 | 2250 Aug 13 | 4:39:38 | Total | 0.2108 | 1.4520 | 356.0 | 224.5 | 92.9 | 1:41:38 | 7:37:38 | 2:47:23 | 3:53:11 | 5:26:05 | 6:31:53 | |
| 10286 | 142 | 32 | 2268 Aug 23 | 11:34:51 | Total | 0.1351 | 1.5915 | 356.7 | 226.9 | 99.8 | 8:36:30 | 14:33:12 | 9:41:24 | 10:44:57 | 12:24:45 | 13:28:18 | |
| 10332 | 142 | 33 | 2286 Sep 03 | 18:37:54 | Total | 0.0648 | 1.7209 | 356.6 | 227.8 | 103.2 | 15:39:36 | 21:36:12 | 16:44:00 | 17:46:18 | 19:29:30 | 20:31:48 | |
| 10378 | 142 | 34 | 2304 Sep 15 | 1:48:59 | Total | 0.0003 | 1.8394 | 355.7 | 227.6 | 103.9 | 22:51:08 | 4:46:50 | 23:55:11 | 0:57:02 | 2:40:56 | 3:42:47 | |
| 10424 | 142 | 35 | 2322 Sep 26 | 9:09:54 | Total | -0.0568 | 1.7360 | 354.3 | 226.5 | 102.8 | 6:12:45 | 12:07:03 | 7:16:39 | 8:18:30 | 10:01:18 | 11:03:09 | |
| 10470 | 142 | 36 | 2340 Oct 06 | 16:39:55 | Total | -0.1074 | 1.6431 | 352.6 | 224.9 | 100.4 | 13:43:37 | 19:36:13 | 14:47:28 | 15:49:43 | 17:30:07 | 18:32:22 | |
| 10515 | 142 | 37 | 2358 Oct 18 | 0:19:34 | Total | -0.1509 | 1.5634 | 350.7 | 222.9 | 97.2 | 21:24:13 | 3:14:55 | 22:28:07 | 23:30:58 | 1:08:10 | 2:11:01 | |
| 10560 | 142 | 38 | 2376 Oct 28 | 8:09:00 | Total | -0.1871 | 1.4971 | 348.7 | 220.9 | 93.7 | 5:14:39 | 11:03:21 | 6:18:33 | 7:22:09 | 8:55:51 | 9:59:27 | |
| 10604 | 142 | 39 | 2394 Nov 08 | 16:08:09 | Total | -0.2159 | 1.4443 | 346.8 | 218.9 | 90.3 | 13:14:45 | 19:01:33 | 14:18:42 | 15:23:00 | 16:53:18 | 17:57:36 | |
| 10650 | 142 | 40 | 2412 Nov 19 | 0:15:25 | Total | -0.2386 | 1.4030 | 345.0 | 217.1 | 87.1 | 21:22:55 | 3:07:55 | 22:26:52 | 23:31:52 | 0:58:58 | 2:03:58 | |
| 10694 | 142 | 41 | 2430 Nov 30 | 8:31:15 | Total | -0.2548 | 1.3735 | 343.3 | 215.5 | 84.6 | 5:39:36 | 11:22:54 | 6:43:30 | 7:48:57 | 9:13:33 | 10:19:00 | |
| 10738 | 142 | 42 | 2448 Dec 10 | 16:53:19 | Total | -0.2667 | 1.3524 | 341.7 | 214.2 | 82.6 | 14:02:28 | 19:44:10 | 15:06:13 | 16:12:01 | 17:34:37 | 18:40:25 | |
| 10781 | 142 | 43 | 2466 Dec 22 | 1:21:41 | Total | -0.2740 | 1.3398 | 340.3 | 213.2 | 81.3 | 22:31:32 | 4:11:50 | 23:35:05 | 0:41:02 | 2:02:20 | 3:08:17 | |
| 10823 | 142 | 44 | 2485 Jan 01 | 9:52:20 | Total | -0.2800 | 1.3298 | 338.8 | 212.3 | 80.2 | 7:02:56 | 12:41:44 | 8:06:11 | 9:12:14 | 10:32:26 | 11:38:29 | |
| 10864 | 142 | 45 | 2503 Jan 13 | 18:27:08 | Total | -0.2833 | 1.3250 | 337.4 | 211.6 | 79.6 | 15:38:26 | 21:15:50 | 16:41:20 | 17:47:20 | 19:06:56 | 20:12:56 | |
| 10905 | 142 | 46 | 2521 Jan 24 | 3:01:30 | Total | -0.2872 | 1.3195 | 336.0 | 210.8 | 78.9 | 0:13:30 | 5:49:30 | 1:16:06 | 2:22:03 | 3:40:57 | 4:46:54 | |
| 10945 | 142 | 47 | 2539 Feb 04 | 11:35:58 | Total | -0.2921 | 1.3124 | 334.5 | 210.1 | 78.1 | 8:48:43 | 14:23:13 | 9:50:55 | 10:56:55 | 12:15:01 | 13:21:01 | |
| 10987 | 142 | 48 | 2557 Feb 14 | 20:06:30 | Total | -0.3008 | 1.2986 | 332.7 | 209.0 | 76.6 | 17:20:09 | 22:52:51 | 18:22:00 | 19:28:12 | 20:44:48 | 21:51:00 | |
| 11028 | 142 | 49 | 2575 Feb 26 | 4:34:54 | Total | -0.3120 | 1.2805 | 330.8 | 207.9 | 74.6 | 1:49:30 | 7:20:18 | 2:50:57 | 3:57:36 | 5:12:12 | 6:18:51 | |
| 11068 | 142 | 50 | 2593 Mar 08 | 12:57:32 | Total | -0.3284 | 1.2528 | 328.7 | 206.3 | 71.4 | 10:13:11 | 15:41:53 | 11:14:23 | 12:21:50 | 13:33:14 | 14:40:41 | |
| 11108 | 142 | 51 | 2611 Mar 20 | 21:14:33 | Total | -0.3502 | 1.2156 | 326.2 | 204.3 | 66.6 | 18:31:27 | 23:57:39 | 19:32:24 | 20:41:15 | 21:47:51 | 22:56:42 | |
| 11148 | 142 | 52 | 2629 Mar 31 | 5:24:37 | Total | -0.3783 | 1.1668 | 323.3 | 201.6 | 59.5 | 2:42:58 | 8:06:16 | 3:43:49 | 4:54:52 | 5:54:22 | 7:05:25 | |
| 11189 | 142 | 53 | 2647 Apr 11 | 13:28:29 | Total | -0.4123 | 1.1071 | 320.0 | 198.2 | 48.5 | 10:48:29 | 16:08:29 | 11:49:23 | 13:04:14 | 13:52:44 | 15:07:35 | |
| 11231 | 142 | 54 | 2665 Apr 21 | 21:25:02 | Total | -0.4528 | 1.0355 | 316.1 | 193.8 | 28.5 | 18:46:59 | 0:03:05 | 19:48:08 | 21:10:47 | 21:39:17 | 23:01:56 | |
| 11274 | 142 | 55 | 2683 May 3 | 5:14:46 | Partial | -0.4996 | 0.9523 | 311.5 | 188.3 | | 2:39:01 | 7:50:31 | 3:40:37 | | | 6:48:55 | |
| 11316 | 142 | 56 | 2701 May 14 | 12:58:21 | Partial | -0.5522 | 0.8584 | 306.2 | 181.4 | | 10:25:15 | 15:31:27 | 11:27:39 | | | 14:29:03 | |
| 11359 | 142 | 57 | 2719 May 25 | 20:36:44 | Partial | -0.6097 | 0.7552 | 300.1 | 172.7 | | 18:06:41 | 23:06:47 | 19:10:23 | | | 22:03:05 | |
| 11401 | 142 | 58 | 2737 Jun 05 | 4:09:30 | Partial | -0.6726 | 0.6421 | 292.9 | 161.9 | | 1:43:03 | 6:35:57 | 2:48:33 | | | 5:30:27 | |
| 11444 | 142 | 59 | 2755 Jun 16 | 11:39:21 | Partial | -0.7384 | 0.5233 | 284.8 | 148.6 | | 9:16:57 | 14:01:45 | 10:25:03 | | | 12:53:39 | |
| 11488 | 142 | 60 | 2773 Jun 26 | 19:05:54 | Partial | -0.8076 | 0.3979 | 275.5 | 131.8 | | 16:48:09 | 21:23:39 | 18:00:00 | | | 20:11:48 | |
| 11534 | 142 | 61 | 2791 Jul 08 | 2:32:22 | Partial | -0.8773 | 0.2713 | 265.2 | 110.6 | | 0:19:46 | 4:44:58 | 1:37:04 | | | 3:27:40 | |
| 11580 | 142 | 62 | 2809 Jul 18 | 9:56:45 | Partial | -0.9494 | 0.1402 | 253.5 | 80.9 | | 7:50:00 | 12:03:30 | 9:16:18 | | | 10:37:12 | |
| 11627 | 142 | 63 | 2827 Jul 29 | 17:23:45 | Partial | -1.0197 | 0.0119 | 240.7 | 23.9 | | 15:23:24 | 19:24:06 | 17:11:48 | | | 17:35:42 | |
| 11674 | 142 | 64 | 2845 Aug 09 | 0:51:23 | Penumbral | -1.0901 | -0.1169 | 226.6 | | | 22:58:05 | 2:44:41 | | | | | |
| 11720 | 142 | 65 | 2863 Aug 20 | 8:23:18 | Penumbral | -1.1571 | -0.2396 | 211.5 | | | 6:37:33 | 10:09:03 | | | | | |
| 11766 | 142 | 66 | 2881 Aug 30 | 15:58:08 | Penumbral | -1.2220 | -0.3589 | 194.9 | | | 14:20:41 | 17:35:35 | | | | | |
| 11812 | 142 | 67 | 2899 Sep 10 | 23:39:29 | Penumbral | -1.2819 | -0.4692 | 177.6 | | | 22:10:41 | 1:08:17 | | | | | |
| 11857 | 142 | 68 | 2917 Sep 22 | 7:26:14 | Penumbral | -1.3377 | -0.5721 | 159.1 | | | 6:06:41 | 8:45:47 | | | | | |
| 11902 | 142 | 69 | 2935 Oct 03 | 15:19:37 | Penumbral | -1.3883 | -0.6658 | 139.6 | | | 14:09:49 | 16:29:25 | | | | | |
| 11947 | 142 | 70 | 2953 Oct 13 | 23:20:11 | Penumbral | -1.4331 | -0.7492 | 119.0 | | | 22:20:41 | 0:19:41 | | | | | |
| 11993 | 142 | 71 | 2971 Oct 25 | 7:28:21 | Penumbral | -1.4719 | -0.8214 | 97.2 | | | 6:39:45 | 8:16:57 | | | | | |
| 12037 | 142 | 72 | 2989 Nov 04 | 15:44:27 | Penumbral | -1.5048 | -0.8830 | 73.3 | | | 15:07:48 | 16:21:06 | | | | | |
| – | 142 | 73 | 3007 Nov 17 | 00:06:57 | Penumbral | -1.5328 | -0.9354 | 43.0 | | | | | | | | | |

== See also ==
- List of lunar eclipses
  - List of Saros series for lunar eclipses
