= March 1980 lunar eclipse =

Penumbral lunar eclipse March 1, 1980

- Penumbral eclipse
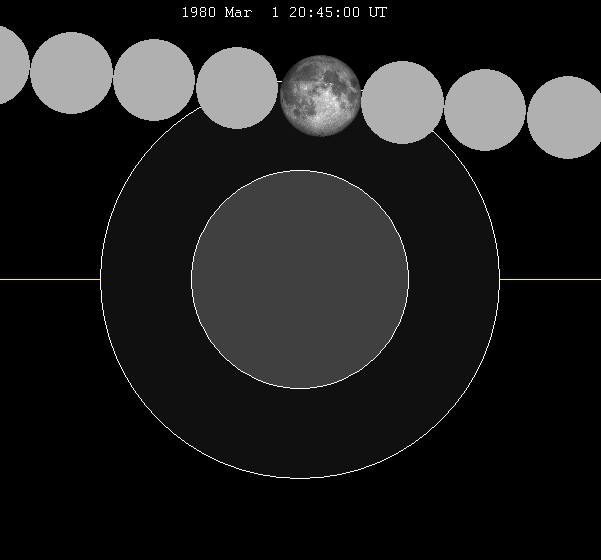
- The Moon's hourly motion shown right to left
- Date: March 1, 1980
- Gamma: 1.2270
- Magnitude: −0.4404
- Saros cycle: 142 (16 of 74)
- Penumbral: 238 minutes, 29 seconds
Contacts (UTC)
- P1: 18:45:56
- Greatest: 20:45:12
- P4: 22:44:24

A penumbral lunar eclipse occurred at the Moon’s ascending node of orbit on Saturday, March 1, 1980, with an umbral magnitude of −0.4404. A lunar eclipse occurs when the Moon moves into the Earth's shadow, causing the Moon to be darkened. A penumbral lunar eclipse occurs when part or all of the Moon's near side passes into the Earth's penumbra. Unlike a solar eclipse, which can only be viewed from a relatively small area of the world, a lunar eclipse may be viewed from anywhere on the night side of Earth. Occurring about 1.6 days before apogee (on March 3, 1980, at 10:50 UTC), the Moon's apparent diameter was smaller.

== Visibility ==
The eclipse was completely visible over Africa, Europe, and much of Asia, seen rising over northeastern North America and eastern South America and setting over northeast Asia and Australia.

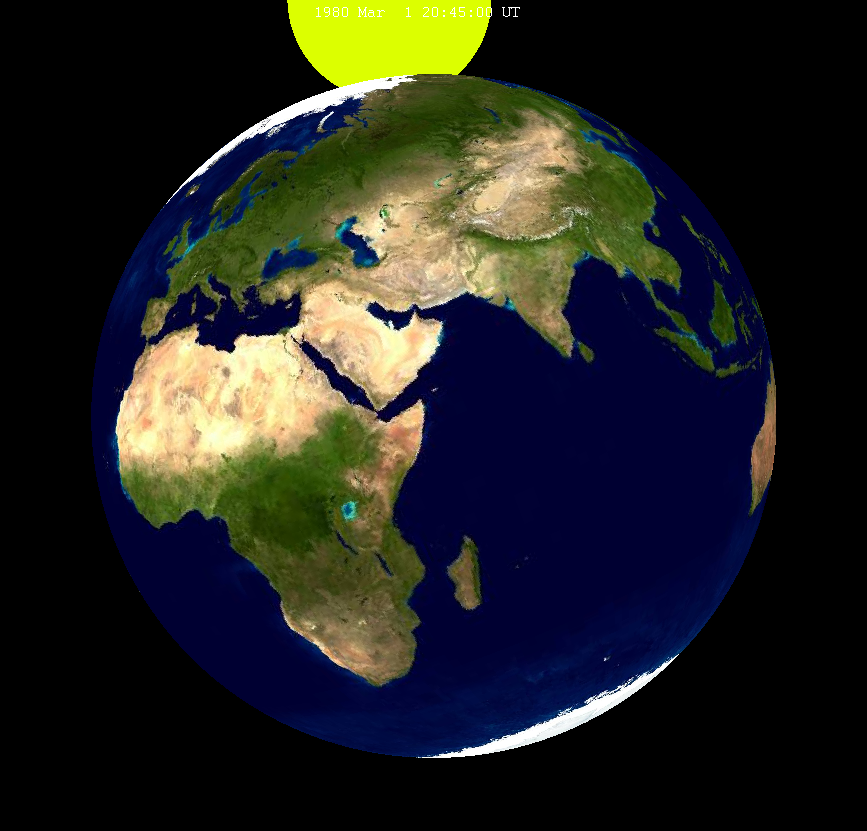
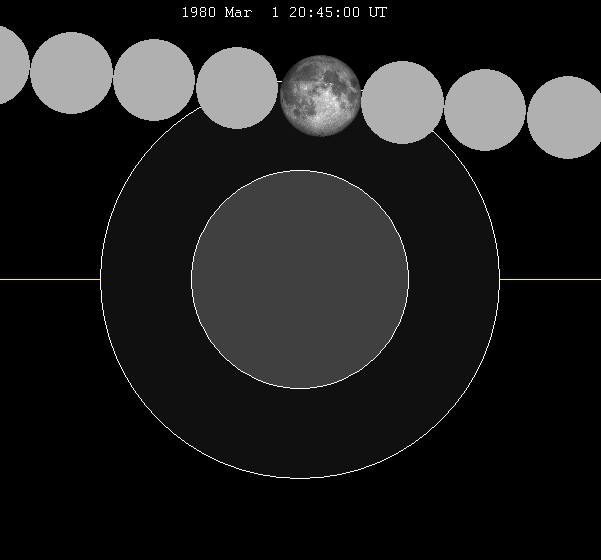

== Eclipse details ==
Shown below is a table displaying details about this particular solar eclipse. It describes various parameters pertaining to this eclipse.

March 1, 1980 Lunar Eclipse Parameters
Parameter	Value
Penumbral Magnitude	0.65455
Umbral Magnitude	−0.44043
Gamma	1.22701
Sun Right Ascension	22h51m28.5s
Sun Declination	-07°16'40.3"
Sun Semi-Diameter	16'08.2"
Sun Equatorial Horizontal Parallax	08.9"
Moon Right Ascension	10h52m45.6s
Moon Declination	+08°20'13.6"
Moon Semi-Diameter	14'44.2"
Moon Equatorial Horizontal Parallax	0°54'05.2"
ΔT	50.7 s

== Eclipse season ==
This eclipse is part of an eclipse season, a period, roughly every six months, when eclipses occur. Only two (or occasionally three) eclipse seasons occur each year, and each season lasts about 35 days and repeats just short of six months (173 days) later; thus two full eclipse seasons always occur each year. Either two or three eclipses happen each eclipse season. In the sequence below, each eclipse is separated by a fortnight.

Eclipse season of February–March 1980
February 16 Descending node (new moon)	March 1 Ascending node (full moon)
Total solar eclipse Solar Saros 130	Penumbral lunar eclipse Lunar Saros 142

== Related eclipses ==
=== Eclipses in 1980 ===
- A total solar eclipse on February 16.
- A penumbral lunar eclipse on March 1.
- A penumbral lunar eclipse on July 27.
- An annular solar eclipse on August 10.
- A penumbral lunar eclipse on August 26.

=== Metonic ===
- Preceded by: Lunar eclipse of May 13, 1976
- Followed by: Lunar eclipse of December 20, 1983

=== Tzolkinex ===
- Preceded by: Lunar eclipse of January 18, 1973
- Followed by: Lunar eclipse of April 14, 1987

=== Half-Saros ===
- Preceded by: Solar eclipse of February 25, 1971
- Followed by: Solar eclipse of March 7, 1989

=== Tritos ===
- Preceded by: Lunar eclipse of April 2, 1969
- Followed by: Lunar eclipse of January 30, 1991

=== Lunar Saros 142 ===
- Preceded by: Lunar eclipse of February 19, 1962
- Followed by: Lunar eclipse of March 13, 1998

=== Inex ===
- Preceded by: Lunar eclipse of March 23, 1951
- Followed by: Lunar eclipse of February 9, 2009

=== Triad ===
- Preceded by: Lunar eclipse of April 30, 1893
- Followed by: Lunar eclipse of December 31, 2066

=== Lunar eclipses of 1977–1980 ===
This eclipse is a member of a semester series. An eclipse in a semester series of lunar eclipses repeats approximately every 177 days and 4 hours (a semester) at alternating nodes of the Moon's orbit.

The penumbral lunar eclipse on July 27, 1980 occurs in the next lunar year eclipse set.

Lunar eclipse series sets from 1977 to 1980
Ascending node				Descending node			
Saros	Date Viewing	Type Chart	Gamma	Saros	Date Viewing	Type Chart	Gamma
112	1977 Apr 04	Partial	−0.9148	117	1977 Sep 27	Penumbral	1.0768
122	1978 Mar 24	Total	−0.2140	127	1978 Sep 16	Total	0.2951
132	1979 Mar 13	Partial	0.5254	137	1979 Sep 06	Total	−0.4305
142	1980 Mar 01	Penumbral	1.2270	147	1980 Aug 26	Penumbral	−1.1608

=== Saros 142 ===
This eclipse is a part of Saros series 142, repeating every 18 years, 11 days, and containing 73 events. The series started with a penumbral lunar eclipse on September 19, 1709. It contains partial eclipses from May 5, 2088 through July 10, 2196; total eclipses from July 22, 2214 through April 21, 2665; and a second set of partial eclipses from May 3, 2683 through July 29, 2827. The series ends at member 73 as a penumbral eclipse on November 17, 3007.

The longest duration of totality will be produced by member 34 at 103 minutes, 54 seconds on September 15, 2304. All eclipses in this series occur at the Moon’s ascending node of orbit.

Greatest	First			
The greatest eclipse of the series will occur on 2304 Sep 15, lasting 103 minutes, 54 seconds.	Penumbral	Partial	Total	Central
The greatest eclipse of the series will occur on 2304 Sep 15, lasting 103 minutes, 54 seconds.	1709 Sep 19	2088 May 05	2214 Jul 22	2250 Aug 13
The greatest eclipse of the series will occur on 2304 Sep 15, lasting 103 minutes, 54 seconds.	Last			
The greatest eclipse of the series will occur on 2304 Sep 15, lasting 103 minutes, 54 seconds.	Central	Total	Partial	Penumbral
The greatest eclipse of the series will occur on 2304 Sep 15, lasting 103 minutes, 54 seconds.	2448 Dec 10	2665 Apr 21	2827 Jul 29	3007 Nov 17

Eclipses are tabulated in three columns; every third eclipse in the same column is one exeligmos apart, so they all cast shadows over approximately the same parts of the Earth.

Series members 7–28 occur between 1801 and 2200:
7	8	9
1817 Nov 23	1835 Dec 05	1853 Dec 15
10	11	12
1871 Dec 26	1890 Jan 06	1908 Jan 18
13	14	15
1926 Jan 28	1944 Feb 09	1962 Feb 19
16	17	18
1980 Mar 01	1998 Mar 13	2016 Mar 23
19	20	21
2034 Apr 03	2052 Apr 14	2070 Apr 25
22	23	24
2088 May 05	2106 May 17	2124 May 28
25	26	27
2142 Jun 08	2160 Jun 18	2178 Jun 30
28
2196 Jul 10

=== Tritos series ===
This eclipse is a part of a tritos cycle, repeating at alternating nodes every 135 synodic months (≈ 3986.63 days, or 11 years minus 1 month). Their appearance and longitude are irregular due to a lack of synchronization with the anomalistic month (period of perigee), but groupings of 3 tritos cycles (≈ 33 years minus 3 months) come close (≈ 434.044 anomalistic months), so eclipses are similar in these groupings.

Series members between 1801 and 2132
1805 Jul 11 (Saros 126)	1816 Jun 10 (Saros 127)	1827 May 11 (Saros 128)	1838 Apr 10 (Saros 129)	1849 Mar 09 (Saros 130)
1860 Feb 07 (Saros 131)	1871 Jan 06 (Saros 132)	1881 Dec 05 (Saros 133)	1892 Nov 04 (Saros 134)	1903 Oct 06 (Saros 135)
1914 Sep 04 (Saros 136)	1925 Aug 04 (Saros 137)	1936 Jul 04 (Saros 138)	1947 Jun 03 (Saros 139)	1958 May 03 (Saros 140)
1969 Apr 02 (Saros 141)	1980 Mar 01 (Saros 142)	1991 Jan 30 (Saros 143)	2001 Dec 30 (Saros 144)	2012 Nov 28 (Saros 145)
2023 Oct 28 (Saros 146)	2034 Sep 28 (Saros 147)	2045 Aug 27 (Saros 148)	2056 Jul 26 (Saros 149)	2067 Jun 27 (Saros 150)
2132 Dec 22 (Saros 156)

=== Inex series ===
This eclipse is a part of the long period inex cycle, repeating at alternating nodes, every 358 synodic months (≈ 10,571.95 days, or 29 years minus 20 days). Their appearance and longitude are irregular due to a lack of synchronization with the anomalistic month (period of perigee). However, groupings of 3 inex cycles (≈ 87 years minus 2 months) comes close (≈ 1,151.02 anomalistic months), so eclipses are similar in these groupings.

Series members between 1801 and 2200
1806 Jun 30 (Saros 136)	1835 Jun 10 (Saros 137)	1864 May 21 (Saros 138)
1893 Apr 30 (Saros 139)	1922 Apr 11 (Saros 140)	1951 Mar 23 (Saros 141)
1980 Mar 01 (Saros 142)	2009 Feb 09 (Saros 143)	2038 Jan 21 (Saros 144)
2066 Dec 31 (Saros 145)	2095 Dec 11 (Saros 146)	2124 Nov 21 (Saros 147)
2153 Nov 01 (Saros 148)	2182 Oct 11 (Saros 149)	

=== Half-Saros cycle ===
A lunar eclipse will be preceded and followed by solar eclipses by 9 years and 5.5 days (a half saros). This lunar eclipse is related to two partial solar eclipses of Solar Saros 149.

February 25, 1971	March 7, 1989

== See also ==
- List of lunar eclipses
- List of 20th-century lunar eclipses
