= Solar eclipse of March 30, 2052 =

Total eclipse

- Total eclipse
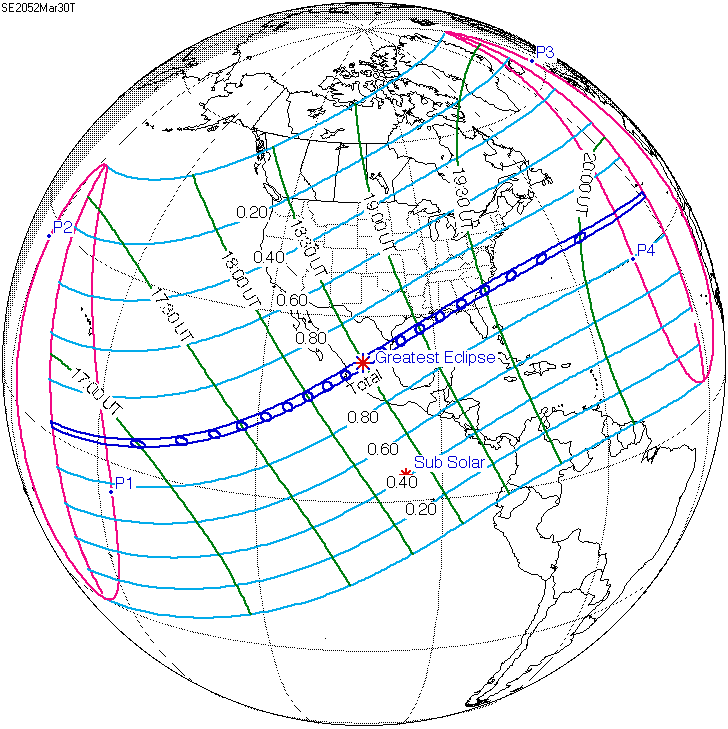
- Map
- Gamma: 0.3238
- Magnitude: 1.0466

Maximum eclipse
- Duration: 248 s (4 min 8 s)
- Coordinates: 22.4°N 102.5°W
- Max. width of band: 164 km (102 mi)

Times (UTC)
- Greatest eclipse: 18:31:53

References
- Saros: 130 (54 of 73)
- Catalog # (SE5000): 9623

A total solar eclipse will occur at the Moon's descending node of orbit on Saturday, March 30, 2052, with a magnitude of 1.0466. A solar eclipse occurs when the Moon passes between Earth and the Sun, thereby totally or partly obscuring the image of the Sun for a viewer on Earth. A total solar eclipse occurs when the Moon's apparent diameter is larger than the Sun's, blocking all direct sunlight, turning day into darkness. Totality occurs in a narrow path across Earth's surface, with the partial solar eclipse visible over a surrounding region thousands of kilometres wide. Occurring about 1.5 days before perigee (on April 1, 2052, at 6:30 UTC), the Moon's apparent diameter will be larger.

The path of totality will be visible from parts of central Mexico, the extreme southern tip of Texas, southeastern Louisiana, southeastern Alabama, Florida, Georgia, and South Carolina. A partial solar eclipse will also be visible for parts of Hawaii, North America, Central America, the Caribbean, and northern South America.

This will be the 2nd total eclipse visible from the Florida panhandle and southwest Georgia in 6.6 years. It will also be the last total solar eclipse visible in the United States until May 11, 2078.

== Eclipse details ==
Shown below are two tables displaying details about this particular solar eclipse. The first table outlines times at which the Moon's penumbra or umbra attains the specific parameter, and the second table describes various other parameters pertaining to this eclipse.

March 30, 2052 Solar Eclipse Times
Event	Time (UTC)
First Penumbral External Contact	2052 March 30 at 15:54:47.5 UTC
First Umbral External Contact	2052 March 30 at 16:52:13.4 UTC
First Central Line	2052 March 30 at 16:53:04.2 UTC
First Umbral Internal Contact	2052 March 30 at 16:53:55.0 UTC
First Penumbral Internal Contact	2052 March 30 at 17:57:37.9 UTC
Ecliptic Conjunction	2052 March 30 at 18:28:31.3 UTC
Greatest Eclipse	2052 March 30 at 18:31:52.9 UTC
Greatest Duration	2052 March 30 at 18:33:58.8 UTC
Equatorial Conjunction	2052 March 30 at 18:42:28.4 UTC
Last Penumbral Internal Contact	2052 March 30 at 19:05:51.6 UTC
Last Umbral Internal Contact	2052 March 30 at 20:09:40.8 UTC
Last Central Line	2052 March 30 at 20:10:33.4 UTC
Last Umbral External Contact	2052 March 30 at 20:11:25.9 UTC
Last Penumbral External Contact	2052 March 30 at 21:08:49.5 UTC

March 30, 2052 Solar Eclipse Parameters
Parameter	Value
Eclipse Magnitude	1.04664
Eclipse Obscuration	1.09545
Gamma	0.32385
Sun Right Ascension	00h39m33.8s
Sun Declination	+04°15'25.9"
Sun Semi-Diameter	16'00.7"
Sun Equatorial Horizontal Parallax	08.8"
Moon Right Ascension	00h39m10.3s
Moon Declination	+04°34'05.5"
Moon Semi-Diameter	16'29.6"
Moon Equatorial Horizontal Parallax	1°00'31.8"
ΔT	85.4 s

== Eclipse season ==
This eclipse is part of an eclipse season, a period, roughly every six months, when eclipses occur. Only two (or occasionally three) eclipse seasons occur each year, and each season lasts about 35 days and repeats just short of six months (173 days) later; thus two full eclipse seasons always occur each year. Either two or three eclipses happen each eclipse season. In the sequence below, each eclipse is separated by a fortnight.

Eclipse season of March–April 2052
March 30 Descending node (new moon)	April 14 Ascending node (full moon)
Total solar eclipse Solar Saros 130	Penumbral lunar eclipse Lunar Saros 142

== Related eclipses ==
=== Eclipses in 2052 ===
- A total solar eclipse on March 30.
- A penumbral lunar eclipse on April 14.
- An annular solar eclipse on September 22.
- A partial lunar eclipse on October 8.

=== Metonic ===
- Preceded by: Solar eclipse of June 11, 2048
- Followed by: Solar eclipse of January 16, 2056

=== Tzolkinex ===
- Preceded by: Solar eclipse of February 16, 2045
- Followed by: Solar eclipse of May 11, 2059

=== Half-Saros ===
- Preceded by: Lunar eclipse of March 25, 2043
- Followed by: Lunar eclipse of April 4, 2061

=== Tritos ===
- Preceded by: Solar eclipse of April 30, 2041
- Followed by: Solar eclipse of February 28, 2063

=== Solar Saros 130 ===
- Preceded by: Solar eclipse of March 20, 2034
- Followed by: Solar eclipse of April 11, 2070

=== Inex ===
- Preceded by: Solar eclipse of April 20, 2023
- Followed by: Solar eclipse of March 10, 2081

=== Triad ===
- Preceded by: Solar eclipse of May 30, 1965
- Followed by: Solar eclipse of January 30, 2139

=== Solar eclipses of 2051–2054 ===
This eclipse is a member of a semester series. An eclipse in a semester series of solar eclipses repeats approximately every 177 days and 4 hours (a semester) at alternating nodes of the Moon's orbit.

The partial solar eclipse on August 3, 2054 occurs in the next lunar year eclipse set.

Solar eclipse series sets from 2051 to 2054
Descending node			Ascending node		
Saros	Map	Gamma	Saros	Map	Gamma
120	April 11, 2051 Partial	1.0169	125	October 4, 2051 Partial	−1.2094
130	March 30, 2052 Total	0.3238	135	September 22, 2052 Annular	−0.448
140	March 20, 2053 Annular	−0.4089	145	September 12, 2053 Total	0.314
150	March 9, 2054 Partial	−1.1711	155	September 2, 2054 Partial	1.0215

=== Saros 130 ===
This eclipse is a part of Saros series 130, repeating every 18 years, 11 days, and containing 73 events. The series started with a partial solar eclipse on August 20, 1096. It contains total eclipses from April 5, 1475 through July 18, 2232. There are no annular or hybrid eclipses in this set. The series ends at member 73 as a partial eclipse on October 25, 2394. Its eclipses are tabulated in three columns; every third eclipse in the same column is one exeligmos apart, so they all cast shadows over approximately the same parts of the Earth.

The longest duration of totality was produced by member 30 at 6 minutes, 41 seconds on July 11, 1619. All eclipses in this series occur at the Moon’s descending node of orbit.

Series members 41–62 occur between 1801 and 2200:
41	42	43
November 9, 1817	November 20, 1835	November 30, 1853
44	45	46
December 12, 1871	December 22, 1889	January 3, 1908
47	48	49
January 14, 1926	January 25, 1944	February 5, 1962
50	51	52
February 16, 1980	February 26, 1998	March 9, 2016
53	54	55
March 20, 2034	March 30, 2052	April 11, 2070
56	57	58
April 21, 2088	May 3, 2106	May 14, 2124
59	60	61
May 25, 2142	June 4, 2160	June 16, 2178
62
June 26, 2196

=== Metonic series ===
The metonic series repeats eclipses every 19 years (6939.69 days), lasting about 5 cycles. Eclipses occur in nearly the same calendar date. In addition, the octon subseries repeats 1/5 of that or every 3.8 years (1387.94 days). All eclipses in this table occur at the Moon's descending node.

22 eclipse events between June 12, 2029 and November 4, 2116
June 11–12	March 30–31	January 16	November 4–5	August 23–24
118	120	122	124	126
June 12, 2029	March 30, 2033	January 16, 2037	November 4, 2040	August 23, 2044
128	130	132	134	136
June 11, 2048	March 30, 2052	January 16, 2056	November 5, 2059	August 24, 2063
138	140	142	144	146
June 11, 2067	March 31, 2071	January 16, 2075	November 4, 2078	August 24, 2082
148	150	152	154	156
June 11, 2086	March 31, 2090	January 16, 2094	November 4, 2097	August 24, 2101
158	160	162	164	
June 12, 2105			November 4, 2116	

=== Tritos series ===
This eclipse is a part of a tritos cycle, repeating at alternating nodes every 135 synodic months (≈ 3986.63 days, or 11 years minus 1 month). Their appearance and longitude are irregular due to a lack of synchronization with the anomalistic month (period of perigee), but groupings of 3 tritos cycles (≈ 33 years minus 3 months) come close (≈ 434.044 anomalistic months), so eclipses are similar in these groupings.

Series members between 1801 and 2200
March 14, 1801 (Saros 107)	February 12, 1812 (Saros 108)	January 12, 1823 (Saros 109)		November 10, 1844 (Saros 111)
		August 9, 1877 (Saros 114)	July 9, 1888 (Saros 115)	June 8, 1899 (Saros 116)
May 9, 1910 (Saros 117)	April 8, 1921 (Saros 118)	March 7, 1932 (Saros 119)	February 4, 1943 (Saros 120)	January 5, 1954 (Saros 121)
December 4, 1964 (Saros 122)	November 3, 1975 (Saros 123)	October 3, 1986 (Saros 124)	September 2, 1997 (Saros 125)	August 1, 2008 (Saros 126)
July 2, 2019 (Saros 127)	June 1, 2030 (Saros 128)	April 30, 2041 (Saros 129)	March 30, 2052 (Saros 130)	February 28, 2063 (Saros 131)
January 27, 2074 (Saros 132)	December 27, 2084 (Saros 133)	November 27, 2095 (Saros 134)	October 26, 2106 (Saros 135)	September 26, 2117 (Saros 136)
August 25, 2128 (Saros 137)	July 25, 2139 (Saros 138)	June 25, 2150 (Saros 139)	May 25, 2161 (Saros 140)	April 23, 2172 (Saros 141)
March 23, 2183 (Saros 142)	February 21, 2194 (Saros 143)			

=== Inex series ===
This eclipse is a part of the long period inex cycle, repeating at alternating nodes, every 358 synodic months (≈ 10,571.95 days, or 29 years minus 20 days). Their appearance and longitude are irregular due to a lack of synchronization with the anomalistic month (period of perigee). However, groupings of 3 inex cycles (≈ 87 years minus 2 months) comes close (≈ 1,151.02 anomalistic months), so eclipses are similar in these groupings.

Series members between 1801 and 2200
September 7, 1820 (Saros 122)	August 18, 1849 (Saros 123)	July 29, 1878 (Saros 124)
July 10, 1907 (Saros 125)	June 19, 1936 (Saros 126)	May 30, 1965 (Saros 127)
May 10, 1994 (Saros 128)	April 20, 2023 (Saros 129)	March 30, 2052 (Saros 130)
March 10, 2081 (Saros 131)	February 18, 2110 (Saros 132)	January 30, 2139 (Saros 133)
January 10, 2168 (Saros 134)	December 19, 2196 (Saros 135)	
