= March 1998 lunar eclipse =

Penumbral lunar eclipse March 13, 1998

- Penumbral eclipse
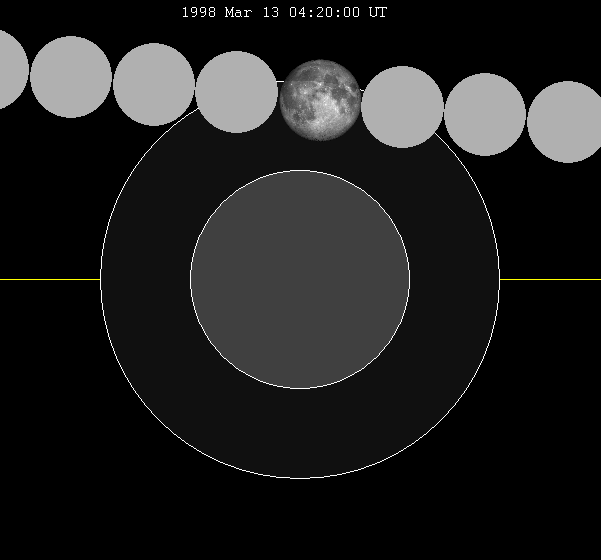
- The Moon's hourly motion shown right to left
- Date: March 13, 1998
- Gamma: 1.1964
- Magnitude: −0.3824
- Saros cycle: 142 (17 of 74)
- Penumbral: 246 minutes, 21 seconds
Contacts (UTC)
- P1: 2:16:52
- Greatest: 4:20:05
- P4: 6:23:13

A penumbral lunar eclipse occurred at the Moon’s ascending node of orbit on Friday, March 13, 1998, with an umbral magnitude of −0.3824. A lunar eclipse occurs when the Moon moves into the Earth's shadow, causing the Moon to be darkened. A penumbral lunar eclipse occurs when part or all of the Moon's near side passes into the Earth's penumbra. Unlike a solar eclipse, which can only be viewed from a relatively small area of the world, a lunar eclipse may be viewed from anywhere on the night side of Earth. Occurring about 2.3 days before apogee (on March 15, 1998, at 12:40 UTC), the Moon's apparent diameter was smaller.

== Visibility ==
The eclipse was completely visible over much of North America, South America, west Africa and western Europe, seen rising over northwestern North America and the central Pacific Ocean and setting over much of Europe, much of Africa, and west and central Asia.

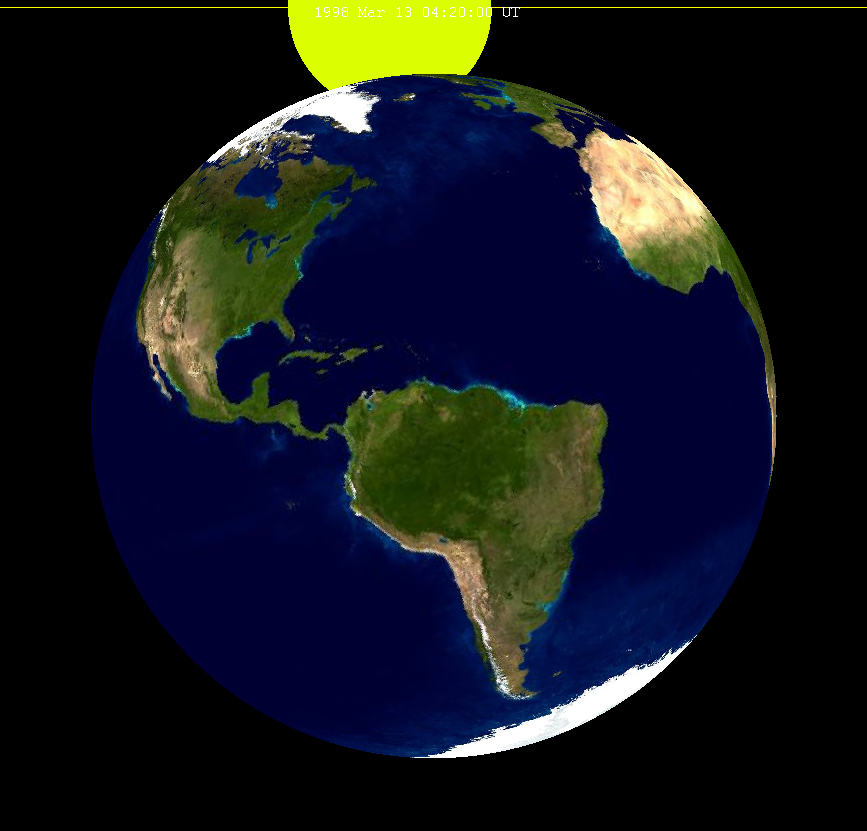
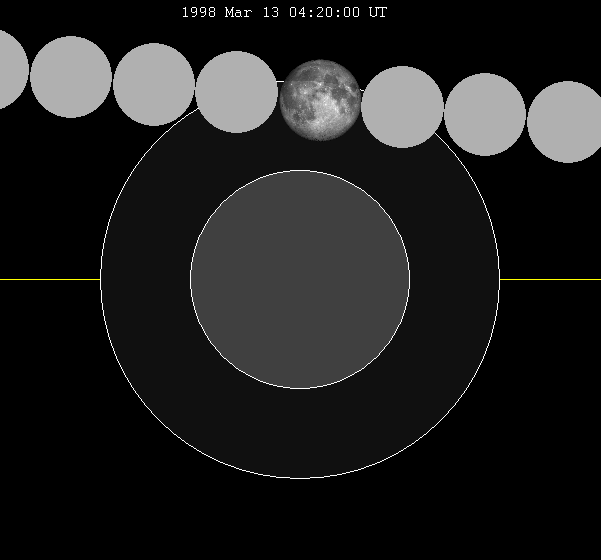

== Eclipse details ==
Shown below is a table displaying details about this particular solar eclipse. It describes various parameters pertaining to this eclipse.

March 13, 1998 Lunar Eclipse Parameters
Parameter	Value
Penumbral Magnitude	0.70862
Umbral Magnitude	−0.38237
Gamma	1.19644
Sun Right Ascension	23h32m02.0s
Sun Declination	-03°01'14.6"
Sun Semi-Diameter	16'05.6"
Sun Equatorial Horizontal Parallax	08.8"
Moon Right Ascension	11h33m20.6s
Moon Declination	+04°02'58.3"
Moon Semi-Diameter	14'45.1"
Moon Equatorial Horizontal Parallax	0°54'08.2"
ΔT	63.0 s

== Eclipse season ==
This eclipse is part of an eclipse season, a period, roughly every six months, when eclipses occur. Only two (or occasionally three) eclipse seasons occur each year, and each season lasts about 35 days and repeats just short of six months (173 days) later; thus two full eclipse seasons always occur each year. Either two or three eclipses happen each eclipse season. In the sequence below, each eclipse is separated by a fortnight.

Eclipse season of February–March 1998
February 26 Descending node (new moon)	March 13 Ascending node (full moon)
Total solar eclipse Solar Saros 130	Penumbral lunar eclipse Lunar Saros 142

== Related eclipses ==
=== Eclipses in 1998 ===
- A total solar eclipse on February 26.
- A penumbral lunar eclipse on March 13.
- A penumbral lunar eclipse on August 8.
- An annular solar eclipse on August 22.
- A penumbral lunar eclipse on September 6.

=== Metonic ===
- Preceded by: Lunar eclipse of May 25, 1994
- Followed by: Lunar eclipse of December 30, 2001

=== Tzolkinex ===
- Preceded by: Lunar eclipse of January 30, 1991
- Followed by: Lunar eclipse of April 24, 2005

=== Half-Saros ===
- Preceded by: Solar eclipse of March 7, 1989
- Followed by: Solar eclipse of March 19, 2007

=== Tritos ===
- Preceded by: Lunar eclipse of April 14, 1987
- Followed by: Lunar eclipse of February 9, 2009

=== Lunar Saros 142 ===
- Preceded by: Lunar eclipse of March 1, 1980
- Followed by: Lunar eclipse of March 23, 2016

=== Inex ===
- Preceded by: Lunar eclipse of April 2, 1969
- Followed by: Lunar eclipse of February 20, 2027

=== Triad ===
- Preceded by: Lunar eclipse of May 13, 1911
- Followed by: Lunar eclipse of January 10, 2085

=== Lunar eclipses of 1995–1998 ===
This eclipse is a member of a semester series. An eclipse in a semester series of lunar eclipses repeats approximately every 177 days and 4 hours (a semester) at alternating nodes of the Moon's orbit.

The penumbral lunar eclipse on August 8, 1998 occurs in the next lunar year eclipse set.

Lunar eclipse series sets from 1995 to 1998
Ascending node				Descending node			
Saros	Date Viewing	Type Chart	Gamma	Saros	Date Viewing	Type Chart	Gamma
112	1995 Apr 15	Partial	−0.9594	117	1995 Oct 08	Penumbral	1.1179
122	1996 Apr 04	Total	−0.2534	127	1996 Sep 27	Total	0.3426
132	1997 Mar 24	Partial	0.4899	137	1997 Sep 16	Total	−0.3768
142	1998 Mar 13	Penumbral	1.1964	147	1998 Sep 06	Penumbral	−1.1058

=== Saros 142 ===
This eclipse is a part of Saros series 142, repeating every 18 years, 11 days, and containing 73 events. The series started with a penumbral lunar eclipse on September 19, 1709. It contains partial eclipses from May 5, 2088 through July 10, 2196; total eclipses from July 22, 2214 through April 21, 2665; and a second set of partial eclipses from May 3, 2683 through July 29, 2827. The series ends at member 73 as a penumbral eclipse on November 17, 3007.

The longest duration of totality will be produced by member 34 at 103 minutes, 54 seconds on September 15, 2304. All eclipses in this series occur at the Moon’s ascending node of orbit.

Greatest	First			
The greatest eclipse of the series will occur on 2304 Sep 15, lasting 103 minutes, 54 seconds.	Penumbral	Partial	Total	Central
The greatest eclipse of the series will occur on 2304 Sep 15, lasting 103 minutes, 54 seconds.	1709 Sep 19	2088 May 05	2214 Jul 22	2250 Aug 13
The greatest eclipse of the series will occur on 2304 Sep 15, lasting 103 minutes, 54 seconds.	Last			
The greatest eclipse of the series will occur on 2304 Sep 15, lasting 103 minutes, 54 seconds.	Central	Total	Partial	Penumbral
The greatest eclipse of the series will occur on 2304 Sep 15, lasting 103 minutes, 54 seconds.	2448 Dec 10	2665 Apr 21	2827 Jul 29	3007 Nov 17

Eclipses are tabulated in three columns; every third eclipse in the same column is one exeligmos apart, so they all cast shadows over approximately the same parts of the Earth.

Series members 7–28 occur between 1801 and 2200:
7	8	9
1817 Nov 23	1835 Dec 05	1853 Dec 15
10	11	12
1871 Dec 26	1890 Jan 06	1908 Jan 18
13	14	15
1926 Jan 28	1944 Feb 09	1962 Feb 19
16	17	18
1980 Mar 01	1998 Mar 13	2016 Mar 23
19	20	21
2034 Apr 03	2052 Apr 14	2070 Apr 25
22	23	24
2088 May 05	2106 May 17	2124 May 28
25	26	27
2142 Jun 08	2160 Jun 18	2178 Jun 30
28
2196 Jul 10

=== Tritos series ===
This eclipse is a part of a tritos cycle, repeating at alternating nodes every 135 synodic months (≈ 3986.63 days, or 11 years minus 1 month). Their appearance and longitude are irregular due to a lack of synchronization with the anomalistic month (period of perigee), but groupings of 3 tritos cycles (≈ 33 years minus 3 months) come close (≈ 434.044 anomalistic months), so eclipses are similar in these groupings.

Series members between 1801 and 2183
1801 Sep 22 (Saros 124)	1812 Aug 22 (Saros 125)	1823 Jul 23 (Saros 126)	1834 Jun 21 (Saros 127)	1845 May 21 (Saros 128)
1856 Apr 20 (Saros 129)	1867 Mar 20 (Saros 130)	1878 Feb 17 (Saros 131)	1889 Jan 17 (Saros 132)	1899 Dec 17 (Saros 133)
1910 Nov 17 (Saros 134)	1921 Oct 16 (Saros 135)	1932 Sep 14 (Saros 136)	1943 Aug 15 (Saros 137)	1954 Jul 16 (Saros 138)
1965 Jun 14 (Saros 139)	1976 May 13 (Saros 140)	1987 Apr 14 (Saros 141)	1998 Mar 13 (Saros 142)	2009 Feb 09 (Saros 143)
2020 Jan 10 (Saros 144)	2030 Dec 09 (Saros 145)	2041 Nov 08 (Saros 146)	2052 Oct 08 (Saros 147)	2063 Sep 07 (Saros 148)
2074 Aug 07 (Saros 149)	2085 Jul 07 (Saros 150)	2096 Jun 06 (Saros 151)	2107 May 07 (Saros 152)	
		2151 Jan 02 (Saros 156)		2172 Oct 31 (Saros 158)
2183 Oct 01 (Saros 159)

=== Inex series ===
This eclipse is a part of the long period inex cycle, repeating at alternating nodes, every 358 synodic months (≈ 10,571.95 days, or 29 years minus 20 days). Their appearance and longitude are irregular due to a lack of synchronization with the anomalistic month (period of perigee). However, groupings of 3 inex cycles (≈ 87 years minus 2 months) comes close (≈ 1,151.02 anomalistic months), so eclipses are similar in these groupings.

Series members between 1801 and 2200
1824 Jul 11 (Saros 136)	1853 Jun 21 (Saros 137)	1882 Jun 01 (Saros 138)
1911 May 13 (Saros 139)	1940 Apr 22 (Saros 140)	1969 Apr 02 (Saros 141)
1998 Mar 13 (Saros 142)	2027 Feb 20 (Saros 143)	2056 Feb 01 (Saros 144)
2085 Jan 10 (Saros 145)	2113 Dec 22 (Saros 146)	2142 Dec 03 (Saros 147)
2171 Nov 12 (Saros 148)	2200 Oct 23 (Saros 149)	

=== Half-Saros cycle ===
A lunar eclipse will be preceded and followed by solar eclipses by 9 years and 5.5 days (a half saros). This lunar eclipse is related to two partial solar eclipses of Solar Saros 149.

March 7, 1989	March 19, 2007
!	!

== See also ==
- List of lunar eclipses
- List of 20th-century lunar eclipses
