= Solar eclipse of September 22, 2052 =

Future annular solar eclipse

- Annular eclipse
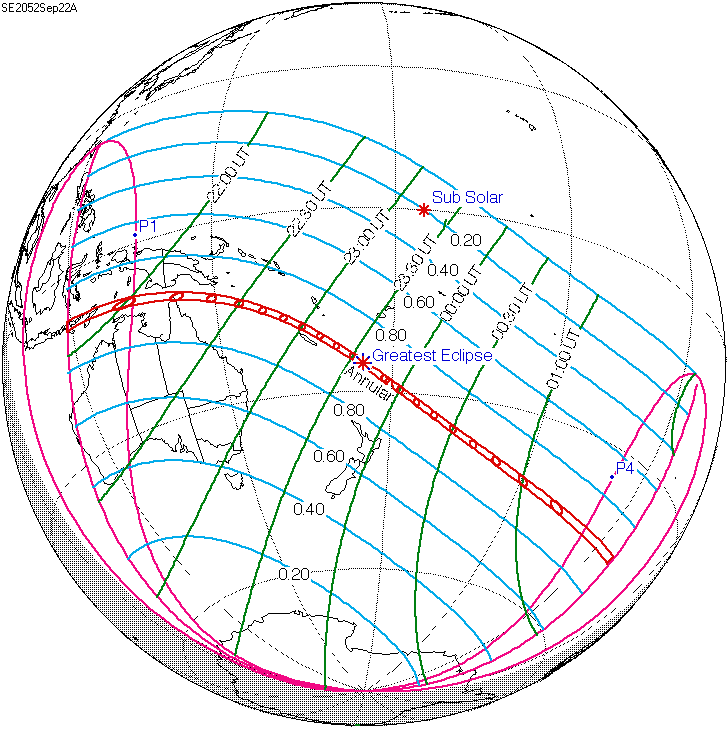
- Map
- Gamma: −0.448
- Magnitude: 0.9734

Maximum eclipse
- Duration: 171 s (2 min 51 s)
- Coordinates: 25.7°S 175°E
- Max. width of band: 106 km (66 mi)

Times (UTC)
- Greatest eclipse: 23:39:10

References
- Saros: 135 (41 of 71)
- Catalog # (SE5000): 9624

An annular solar eclipse will occur at the Moon's ascending node of orbit between Sunday, September 22 and Monday, September 23, 2052, with a magnitude of 0.9734. A solar eclipse occurs when the Moon passes between Earth and the Sun, thereby totally or partly obscuring the image of the Sun for a viewer on Earth. An annular solar eclipse occurs when the Moon's apparent diameter is smaller than the Sun's, blocking most of the Sun's light and causing the Sun to look like an annulus (ring). An annular eclipse appears as a partial eclipse over a region of the Earth thousands of kilometres wide. Occurring about 5.9 days before apogee (on September 28, 2052, at 20:25 UTC), the Moon's apparent diameter will be smaller.

The path of annularity will be visible from parts of southern Indonesia, East Timor, the northern tip of Queensland, Australia, and New Caledonia. A partial solar eclipse will also be visible for parts of Australia, Indonesia, the Philippines, Oceania, and Antarctica.

== Eclipse details ==
Shown below are two tables displaying details about this particular solar eclipse. The first table outlines times at which the Moon's penumbra or umbra attains the specific parameter, and the second table describes various other parameters pertaining to this eclipse.

September 22, 2052 Solar Eclipse Times
Event	Time (UTC)
First Penumbral External Contact	2052 September 22 at 20:49:51.5 UTC
First Umbral External Contact	2052 September 22 at 21:56:15.3 UTC
First Central Line	2052 September 22 at 21:57:42.0 UTC
First Umbral Internal Contact	2052 September 22 at 21:59:08.9 UTC
Ecliptic Conjunction	2052 September 22 at 23:34:05.9 UTC
Greatest Eclipse	2052 September 22 at 23:39:09.7 UTC
Equatorial Conjunction	2052 September 22 at 23:55:26.1 UTC
Greatest Duration	2052 September 23 at 00:05:29.0 UTC
Last Umbral Internal Contact	2052 September 23 at 01:18:56.2 UTC
Last Central Line	2052 September 23 at 01:20:26.2 UTC
Last Umbral External Contact	2052 September 23 at 01:21:56.0 UTC
Last Penumbral External Contact	2052 September 23 at 02:28:26.7 UTC

September 22, 2052 Solar Eclipse Parameters
Parameter	Value
Eclipse Magnitude	0.97338
Eclipse Obscuration	0.94747
Gamma	−0.44804
Sun Right Ascension	12h02m27.0s
Sun Declination	-00°15'55.5"
Sun Semi-Diameter	15'56.2"
Sun Equatorial Horizontal Parallax	08.8"
Moon Right Ascension	12h01m56.4s
Moon Declination	-00°39'49.3"
Moon Semi-Diameter	15'17.9"
Moon Equatorial Horizontal Parallax	0°56'08.8"
ΔT	85.7 s

== Eclipse season ==
This eclipse is part of an eclipse season, a period, roughly every six months, when eclipses occur. Only two (or occasionally three) eclipse seasons occur each year, and each season lasts about 35 days and repeats just short of six months (173 days) later; thus two full eclipse seasons always occur each year. Either two or three eclipses happen each eclipse season. In the sequence below, each eclipse is separated by a fortnight.

Eclipse season of September–October 2052
September 22 Ascending node (new moon)	October 8 Descending node (full moon)
Annular solar eclipse Solar Saros 135	Partial lunar eclipse Lunar Saros 147

== Related eclipses ==
=== Eclipses in 2052 ===
- A total solar eclipse on March 30.
- A penumbral lunar eclipse on April 14.
- An annular solar eclipse on September 22.
- A partial lunar eclipse on October 8.

=== Metonic ===
- Preceded by: Solar eclipse of December 5, 2048
- Followed by: Solar eclipse of July 12, 2056

=== Tzolkinex ===
- Preceded by: Solar eclipse of August 12, 2045
- Followed by: Solar eclipse of November 5, 2059

=== Half-Saros ===
- Preceded by: Lunar eclipse of September 19, 2043
- Followed by: Lunar eclipse of September 29, 2061

=== Tritos ===
- Preceded by: Solar eclipse of October 25, 2041
- Followed by: Solar eclipse of August 24, 2063

=== Solar Saros 135 ===
- Preceded by: Solar eclipse of September 12, 2034
- Followed by: Solar eclipse of October 4, 2070

=== Inex ===
- Preceded by: Solar eclipse of October 14, 2023
- Followed by: Solar eclipse of September 3, 2081

=== Triad ===
- Preceded by: Solar eclipse of November 23, 1965
- Followed by: Solar eclipse of July 25, 2139

=== Solar eclipses of 2051–2054 ===
This eclipse is a member of a semester series. An eclipse in a semester series of solar eclipses repeats approximately every 177 days and 4 hours (a semester) at alternating nodes of the Moon's orbit.

The partial solar eclipse on August 3, 2054 occurs in the next lunar year eclipse set.

Solar eclipse series sets from 2051 to 2054
Descending node			Ascending node		
Saros	Map	Gamma	Saros	Map	Gamma
120	April 11, 2051 Partial	1.0169	125	October 4, 2051 Partial	−1.2094
130	March 30, 2052 Total	0.3238	135	September 22, 2052 Annular	−0.448
140	March 20, 2053 Annular	−0.4089	145	September 12, 2053 Total	0.314
150	March 9, 2054 Partial	−1.1711	155	September 2, 2054 Partial	1.0215

=== Saros 135 ===
This eclipse is a part of Saros series 135, repeating every 18 years, 11 days, and containing 71 events. The series started with a partial solar eclipse on July 5, 1331. It contains annular eclipses from October 21, 1511 through February 24, 2305; hybrid eclipses on March 8, 2323 and March 18, 2341; and total eclipses from March 29, 2359 through May 22, 2449. The series ends at member 71 as a partial eclipse on August 17, 2593. Its eclipses are tabulated in three columns; every third eclipse in the same column is one exeligmos apart, so they all cast shadows over approximately the same parts of the Earth.

The longest duration of annularity was produced by member 16 at 10 minutes, 41 seconds on December 24, 1601, and the longest duration of totality will be produced by member 62 at 2 minutes, 27 seconds on May 12, 2431. All eclipses in this series occur at the Moon’s ascending node of orbit.

Series members 28–49 occur between 1801 and 2200:
28	29	30
May 5, 1818	May 15, 1836	May 26, 1854
31	32	33
June 6, 1872	June 17, 1890	June 28, 1908
34	35	36
July 9, 1926	July 20, 1944	July 31, 1962
37	38	39
August 10, 1980	August 22, 1998	September 1, 2016
40	42	42
September 12, 2034	September 22, 2052	October 4, 2070
43	44	45
October 14, 2088	October 26, 2106	November 6, 2124
46	47	48
November 17, 2142	November 27, 2160	December 9, 2178
49
December 19, 2196

=== Metonic series ===
The metonic series repeats eclipses every 19 years (6939.69 days), lasting about 5 cycles. Eclipses occur in nearly the same calendar date. In addition, the octon subseries repeats 1/5 of that or every 3.8 years (1387.94 days). All eclipses in this table occur at the Moon's ascending node.

21 eclipse events between July 13, 2018 and July 12, 2094
July 12–13	April 30–May 1	February 16–17	December 5–6	September 22–23
117	119	121	123	125
July 13, 2018	April 30, 2022	February 17, 2026	December 5, 2029	September 23, 2033
127	129	131	133	135
July 13, 2037	April 30, 2041	February 16, 2045	December 5, 2048	September 22, 2052
137	139	141	143	145
July 12, 2056	April 30, 2060	February 17, 2064	December 6, 2067	September 23, 2071
147	149	151	153	155
July 13, 2075	May 1, 2079	February 16, 2083	December 6, 2086	September 23, 2090
157
July 12, 2094

=== Tritos series ===
This eclipse is a part of a tritos cycle, repeating at alternating nodes every 135 synodic months (≈ 3986.63 days, or 11 years minus 1 month). Their appearance and longitude are irregular due to a lack of synchronization with the anomalistic month (period of perigee), but groupings of 3 tritos cycles (≈ 33 years minus 3 months) come close (≈ 434.044 anomalistic months), so eclipses are similar in these groupings.

Series members between 1801 and 2200
September 8, 1801 (Saros 112)	August 7, 1812 (Saros 113)	July 8, 1823 (Saros 114)	June 7, 1834 (Saros 115)	May 6, 1845 (Saros 116)
April 5, 1856 (Saros 117)	March 6, 1867 (Saros 118)	February 2, 1878 (Saros 119)	January 1, 1889 (Saros 120)	December 3, 1899 (Saros 121)
November 2, 1910 (Saros 122)	October 1, 1921 (Saros 123)	August 31, 1932 (Saros 124)	August 1, 1943 (Saros 125)	June 30, 1954 (Saros 126)
May 30, 1965 (Saros 127)	April 29, 1976 (Saros 128)	March 29, 1987 (Saros 129)	February 26, 1998 (Saros 130)	January 26, 2009 (Saros 131)
December 26, 2019 (Saros 132)	November 25, 2030 (Saros 133)	October 25, 2041 (Saros 134)	September 22, 2052 (Saros 135)	August 24, 2063 (Saros 136)
July 24, 2074 (Saros 137)	June 22, 2085 (Saros 138)	May 22, 2096 (Saros 139)	April 23, 2107 (Saros 140)	March 22, 2118 (Saros 141)
February 18, 2129 (Saros 142)	January 20, 2140 (Saros 143)	December 19, 2150 (Saros 144)	November 17, 2161 (Saros 145)	October 17, 2172 (Saros 146)
September 16, 2183 (Saros 147)	August 16, 2194 (Saros 148)			

=== Inex series ===
This eclipse is a part of the long period inex cycle, repeating at alternating nodes, every 358 synodic months (≈ 10,571.95 days, or 29 years minus 20 days). Their appearance and longitude are irregular due to a lack of synchronization with the anomalistic month (period of perigee). However, groupings of 3 inex cycles (≈ 87 years minus 2 months) comes close (≈ 1,151.02 anomalistic months), so eclipses are similar in these groupings.

Series members between 1801 and 2200
March 4, 1821 (Saros 127)	February 12, 1850 (Saros 128)	January 22, 1879 (Saros 129)
January 3, 1908 (Saros 130)	December 13, 1936 (Saros 131)	November 23, 1965 (Saros 132)
November 3, 1994 (Saros 133)	October 14, 2023 (Saros 134)	September 22, 2052 (Saros 135)
September 3, 2081 (Saros 136)	August 15, 2110 (Saros 137)	July 25, 2139 (Saros 138)
July 5, 2168 (Saros 139)	June 15, 2197 (Saros 140)	
