= April 2034 lunar eclipse =

Astronomical event

- Penumbral eclipse
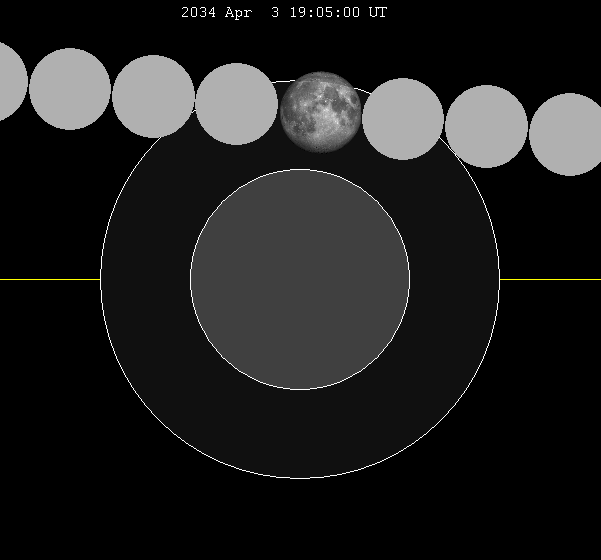
- The Moon's hourly motion shown right to left
- Date: April 3, 2034
- Gamma: 1.1144
- Magnitude: −0.2263
- Saros cycle: 142 (19 of 74)
- Penumbral: 265 minutes, 25 seconds
Contacts (UTC)
- P1: 16:52:54
- Greatest: 19:06:59
- P4: 21:18:19

A penumbral lunar eclipse will occur at the Moon’s ascending node of orbit on Monday, April 3, 2034, with an umbral magnitude of −0.2263. A lunar eclipse occurs when the Moon moves into the Earth's shadow, causing the Moon to be darkened. A penumbral lunar eclipse occurs when part or all of the Moon's near side passes into the Earth's penumbra. Unlike a solar eclipse, which can only be viewed from a relatively small area of the world, a lunar eclipse may be viewed from anywhere on the night side of Earth. Occurring about 2.2 days before apogee (on April 5, 2034, at 23:45 UTC), the Moon's apparent diameter will be smaller.

== Visibility ==
The eclipse will be completely visible over east Africa, eastern Europe, Asia, and western Australia, seen rising over west Africa, western Europe, and eastern South America and setting over eastern Australia and northeast Asia.

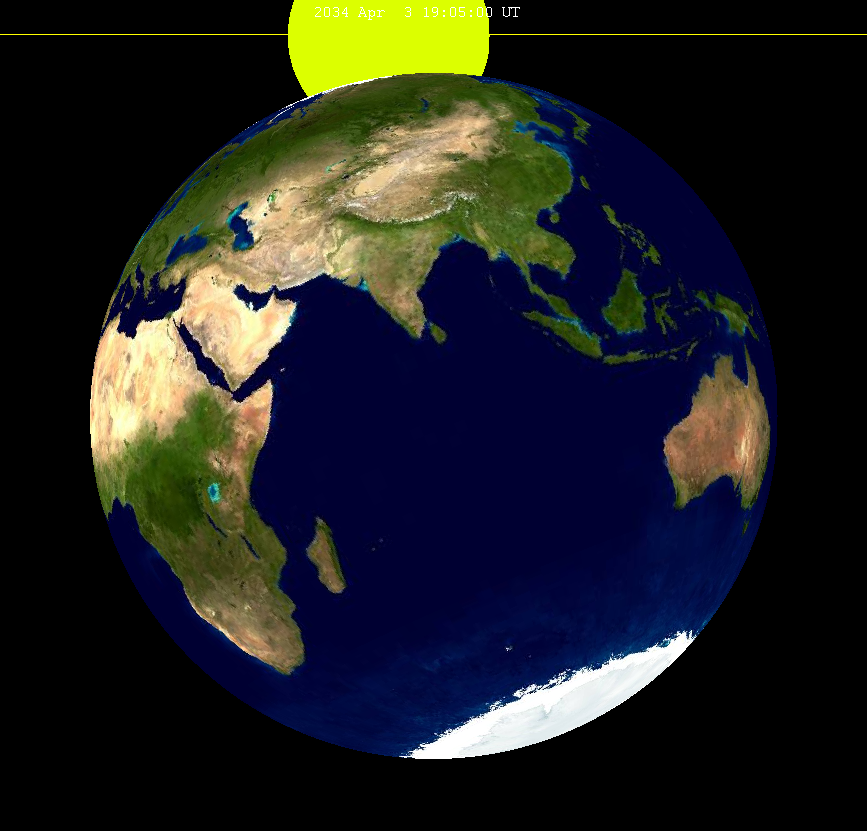
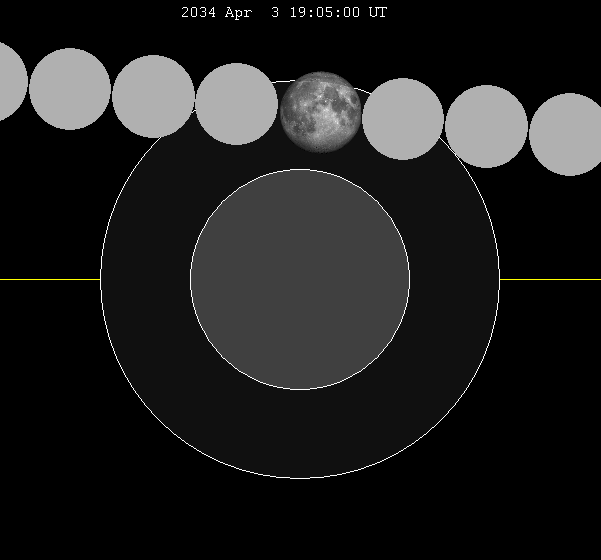

== Eclipse details ==
Shown below is a table displaying details about this particular lunar eclipse. It describes various parameters pertaining to this eclipse.

April 3, 2034 Lunar Eclipse Parameters
Parameter	Value
Penumbral Magnitude	0.85566
Umbral Magnitude	−0.22631
Gamma	1.11441
Sun Right Ascension	00h51m54.0s
Sun Declination	+05°33'29.1"
Sun Semi-Diameter	15'59.8"
Sun Equatorial Horizontal Parallax	08.8"
Moon Right Ascension	12h53m05.6s
Moon Declination	-04°35'42.2"
Moon Semi-Diameter	14'47.1"
Moon Equatorial Horizontal Parallax	0°54'15.6"
ΔT	76.0 s

== Eclipse season ==
This eclipse is part of an eclipse season, a period, roughly every six months, when eclipses occur. Only two (or occasionally three) eclipse seasons occur each year, and each season lasts about 35 days and repeats just short of six months (173 days) later; thus two full eclipse seasons always occur each year. Either two or three eclipses happen each eclipse season. In the sequence below, each eclipse is separated by a fortnight.

Eclipse season of March–April 2034
March 20 Descending node (new moon)	April 3 Ascending node (full moon)
Total solar eclipse Solar Saros 130	Penumbral lunar eclipse Lunar Saros 142

== Related eclipses ==
=== Eclipses in 2034 ===
- A total solar eclipse on March 20.
- A penumbral lunar eclipse on April 3.
- An annular solar eclipse on September 12.
- A partial lunar eclipse on September 28.

=== Metonic ===
- Preceded by: Lunar eclipse of June 15, 2030
- Followed by: Lunar eclipse of January 21, 2038

=== Tzolkinex ===
- Preceded by: Lunar eclipse of February 20, 2027
- Followed by: Lunar eclipse of May 16, 2041

=== Half-Saros ===
- Preceded by: Solar eclipse of March 29, 2025
- Followed by: Solar eclipse of April 9, 2043

=== Tritos ===
- Preceded by: Lunar eclipse of May 5, 2023
- Followed by: Lunar eclipse of March 3, 2045

=== Lunar Saros 142 ===
- Preceded by: Lunar eclipse of March 23, 2016
- Followed by: Lunar eclipse of April 14, 2052

=== Inex ===
- Preceded by: Lunar eclipse of April 24, 2005
- Followed by: Lunar eclipse of March 14, 2063

=== Triad ===
- Preceded by: Lunar eclipse of June 3, 1947
- Followed by: Lunar eclipse of February 2, 2121

=== Lunar eclipses of 2031–2034 ===
This eclipse is a member of a semester series. An eclipse in a semester series of lunar eclipses repeats approximately every 177 days and 4 hours (a semester) at alternating nodes of the Moon's orbit.

The penumbral lunar eclipse on June 5, 2031 occurs in the previous lunar year eclipse set.

Lunar eclipse series sets from 2031 to 2034
Ascending node				Descending node			
Saros	Date Viewing	Type Chart	Gamma	Saros	Date Viewing	Type Chart	Gamma
112	2031 May 07	Penumbral	−1.0694	117	2031 Oct 30	Penumbral	1.1774
122	2032 Apr 25	Total	−0.3558	127	2032 Oct 18	Total	0.4169
132	2033 Apr 14	Total	0.3954	137	2033 Oct 08	Total	−0.2889
142	2034 Apr 03	Penumbral	1.1144	147	2034 Sep 28	Partial	−1.0110

=== Saros 142 ===
This eclipse is a part of Saros series 142, repeating every 18 years, 11 days, and containing 73 events. The series started with a penumbral lunar eclipse on September 19, 1709. It contains partial eclipses from May 5, 2088 through July 10, 2196; total eclipses from July 22, 2214 through April 21, 2665; and a second set of partial eclipses from May 3, 2683 through July 29, 2827. The series ends at member 73 as a penumbral eclipse on November 17, 3007.

The longest duration of totality will be produced by member 34 at 103 minutes, 54 seconds on September 15, 2304. All eclipses in this series occur at the Moon’s ascending node of orbit.

Greatest	First			
The greatest eclipse of the series will occur on 2304 Sep 15, lasting 103 minutes, 54 seconds.	Penumbral	Partial	Total	Central
The greatest eclipse of the series will occur on 2304 Sep 15, lasting 103 minutes, 54 seconds.	1709 Sep 19	2088 May 05	2214 Jul 22	2250 Aug 13
The greatest eclipse of the series will occur on 2304 Sep 15, lasting 103 minutes, 54 seconds.	Last			
The greatest eclipse of the series will occur on 2304 Sep 15, lasting 103 minutes, 54 seconds.	Central	Total	Partial	Penumbral
The greatest eclipse of the series will occur on 2304 Sep 15, lasting 103 minutes, 54 seconds.	2448 Dec 10	2665 Apr 21	2827 Jul 29	3007 Nov 17

Eclipses are tabulated in three columns; every third eclipse in the same column is one exeligmos apart, so they all cast shadows over approximately the same parts of the Earth.

Series members 7–28 occur between 1801 and 2200:
7	8	9
1817 Nov 23	1835 Dec 05	1853 Dec 15
10	11	12
1871 Dec 26	1890 Jan 06	1908 Jan 18
13	14	15
1926 Jan 28	1944 Feb 09	1962 Feb 19
16	17	18
1980 Mar 01	1998 Mar 13	2016 Mar 23
19	20	21
2034 Apr 03	2052 Apr 14	2070 Apr 25
22	23	24
2088 May 05	2106 May 17	2124 May 28
25	26	27
2142 Jun 08	2160 Jun 18	2178 Jun 30
28
2196 Jul 10

=== Tritos series ===
This eclipse is a part of a tritos cycle, repeating at alternating nodes every 135 synodic months (≈ 3986.63 days, or 11 years minus 1 month). Their appearance and longitude are irregular due to a lack of synchronization with the anomalistic month (period of perigee), but groupings of 3 tritos cycles (≈ 33 years minus 3 months) come close (≈ 434.044 anomalistic months), so eclipses are similar in these groupings.

Series members between 1801 and 2187
1805 Jan 15 (Saros 121)	1815 Dec 16 (Saros 122)	1826 Nov 14 (Saros 123)	1837 Oct 13 (Saros 124)	1848 Sep 13 (Saros 125)
1859 Aug 13 (Saros 126)	1870 Jul 12 (Saros 127)	1881 Jun 12 (Saros 128)	1892 May 11 (Saros 129)	1903 Apr 12 (Saros 130)
1914 Mar 12 (Saros 131)	1925 Feb 08 (Saros 132)	1936 Jan 08 (Saros 133)	1946 Dec 08 (Saros 134)	1957 Nov 07 (Saros 135)
1968 Oct 06 (Saros 136)	1979 Sep 06 (Saros 137)	1990 Aug 06 (Saros 138)	2001 Jul 05 (Saros 139)	2012 Jun 04 (Saros 140)
2023 May 05 (Saros 141)	2034 Apr 03 (Saros 142)	2045 Mar 03 (Saros 143)	2056 Feb 01 (Saros 144)	2066 Dec 31 (Saros 145)
2077 Nov 29 (Saros 146)	2088 Oct 30 (Saros 147)	2099 Sep 29 (Saros 148)	2110 Aug 29 (Saros 149)	2121 Jul 30 (Saros 150)
2132 Jun 28 (Saros 151)	2143 May 28 (Saros 152)	2154 Apr 28 (Saros 153)		
2187 Jan 24 (Saros 156)

=== Inex series ===
This eclipse is a part of the long period inex cycle, repeating at alternating nodes, every 358 synodic months (≈ 10,571.95 days, or 29 years minus 20 days). Their appearance and longitude are irregular due to a lack of synchronization with the anomalistic month (period of perigee). However, groupings of 3 inex cycles (≈ 87 years minus 2 months) comes close (≈ 1,151.02 anomalistic months), so eclipses are similar in these groupings.

Series members between 1801 and 2200
1802 Sep 11 (Saros 134)	1831 Aug 23 (Saros 135)	1860 Aug 01 (Saros 136)
1889 Jul 12 (Saros 137)	1918 Jun 24 (Saros 138)	1947 Jun 03 (Saros 139)
1976 May 13 (Saros 140)	2005 Apr 24 (Saros 141)	2034 Apr 03 (Saros 142)
2063 Mar 14 (Saros 143)	2092 Feb 23 (Saros 144)	2121 Feb 02 (Saros 145)
2150 Jan 13 (Saros 146)	2178 Dec 24 (Saros 147)	

=== Half-Saros cycle ===
A lunar eclipse will be preceded and followed by solar eclipses by 9 years and 5.5 days (a half saros). This lunar eclipse is related to two total solar eclipses of Solar Saros 149.

March 29, 2025	April 9, 2043

== See also ==
- List of lunar eclipses and List of 21st-century lunar eclipses
