= March 2016 lunar eclipse =

Penumbral lunar eclipse 23 March 2016

- Penumbral eclipse
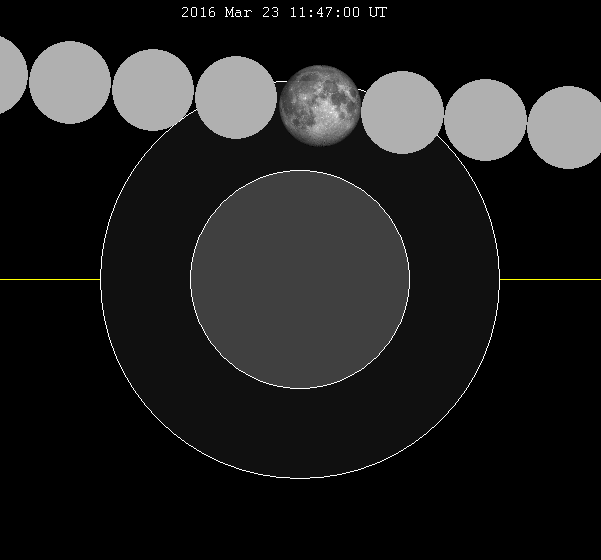
- The hourly motion of the Moon shown right to left
- Date: March 23, 2016
- Gamma: 1.1592
- Magnitude: −0.3107
- Saros cycle: 142 (18 of 73)
- Penumbral: 255 minutes, 21 seconds
Contacts (UTC)
- P1: 09:39:29
- Greatest: 11:47:12
- P4: 13:54:50

External image
- https://earthsky.org/todays-image/photos-march-23-2016-penumbral-eclipse-of-moon/

A penumbral lunar eclipse occurred at the Moon’s ascending node of orbit on Wednesday, March 23, 2016, with an umbral magnitude of −0.3107. A lunar eclipse occurs when the Moon moves into the Earth's shadow, causing the Moon to be darkened. A penumbral lunar eclipse occurs when part or all of the Moon's near side passes into the Earth's penumbra. Unlike a solar eclipse, which can only be viewed from a relatively small area of the world, a lunar eclipse may be viewed from anywhere on the night side of Earth. Occurring about 2 days before apogee (on March 25, 2016, at 10:15 UTC), the Moon's apparent diameter was smaller.

== Visibility ==
The eclipse was completely visible over Australia and western North America, seen rising over much of Asia and setting over central and eastern North America and western South America.

Hourly motion shown right to left
Visibility map

== Eclipse details ==
Shown below is a table displaying details about this particular solar eclipse. It describes various parameters pertaining to this eclipse.

March 23, 2016 Lunar Eclipse Parameters
Parameter	Value
Penumbral Magnitude	0.77585
Umbral Magnitude	−0.31071
Gamma	1.15916
Sun Right Ascension	00h12m02.0s
Sun Declination	+01°18'10.9"
Sun Semi-Diameter	16'02.7"
Sun Equatorial Horizontal Parallax	08.8"
Moon Right Ascension	12h13m18.6s
Moon Declination	-00°18'21.4"
Moon Semi-Diameter	14'46.0"
Moon Equatorial Horizontal Parallax	0°54'11.6"
ΔT	68.0 s

== Eclipse season ==
This eclipse is part of an eclipse season, a period, roughly every six months, when eclipses occur. Only two (or occasionally three) eclipse seasons occur each year, and each season lasts about 35 days and repeats just short of six months (173 days) later; thus two full eclipse seasons always occur each year. Either two or three eclipses happen each eclipse season. In the sequence below, each eclipse is separated by a fortnight.

Eclipse season of March 2016
March 9 Descending node (new moon)	March 23 Ascending node (full moon)
Total solar eclipse Solar Saros 130	Penumbral lunar eclipse Lunar Saros 142

== Related eclipses ==
=== Eclipses in 2016 ===
- A total solar eclipse on March 9.
- A penumbral lunar eclipse on March 23.
- A penumbral lunar eclipse on August 18.
- An annular solar eclipse on September 1.
- A penumbral lunar eclipse on September 16.

=== Metonic ===
- Preceded by: Lunar eclipse of June 4, 2012
- Followed by: Lunar eclipse of January 10, 2020

=== Tzolkinex ===
- Preceded by: Lunar eclipse of February 9, 2009
- Followed by: Lunar eclipse of May 5, 2023

=== Half-Saros ===
- Preceded by: Solar eclipse of March 19, 2007
- Followed by: Solar eclipse of March 29, 2025

=== Tritos ===
- Preceded by: Lunar eclipse of April 24, 2005
- Followed by: Lunar eclipse of February 20, 2027

=== Lunar Saros 142 ===
- Preceded by: Lunar eclipse of March 13, 1998
- Followed by: Lunar eclipse of April 3, 2034

=== Inex ===
- Preceded by: Lunar eclipse of April 14, 1987
- Followed by: Lunar eclipse of March 3, 2045

=== Triad ===
- Preceded by: Lunar eclipse of May 23, 1929
- Followed by: Lunar eclipse of January 23, 2103

=== Lunar eclipses of 2013–2016 ===
This eclipse is a member of a semester series. An eclipse in a semester series of lunar eclipses repeats approximately every 177 days and 4 hours (a semester) at alternating nodes of the Moon's orbit.

The penumbral lunar eclipse on May 25, 2013 occurs in the previous lunar year eclipse set, and the penumbral lunar eclipse on August 18, 2016 occurs in the next lunar year eclipse set.

Lunar eclipse series sets from 2013 to 2016
Ascending node				Descending node			
Saros	Date Viewing	Type Chart	Gamma	Saros	Date Viewing	Type Chart	Gamma
112	2013 Apr 25	Partial	−1.0121	117	2013 Oct 18	Penumbral	1.1508
122	2014 Apr 15	Total	−0.3017	127	2014 Oct 08	Total	0.3827
132	2015 Apr 04	Total	0.4460	137	2015 Sep 28	Total	−0.3296
142	2016 Mar 23	Penumbral	1.1592	147	2016 Sep 16	Penumbral	−1.0549

=== Saros 142 ===
This eclipse is a part of Saros series 142, repeating every 18 years, 11 days, and containing 73 events. The series started with a penumbral lunar eclipse on September 19, 1709. It contains partial eclipses from May 5, 2088 through July 10, 2196; total eclipses from July 22, 2214 through April 21, 2665; and a second set of partial eclipses from May 3, 2683 through July 29, 2827. The series ends at member 73 as a penumbral eclipse on November 17, 3007.

The longest duration of totality will be produced by member 34 at 103 minutes, 54 seconds on September 15, 2304. All eclipses in this series occur at the Moon’s ascending node of orbit.

Greatest	First			
The greatest eclipse of the series will occur on 2304 Sep 15, lasting 103 minutes, 54 seconds.	Penumbral	Partial	Total	Central
The greatest eclipse of the series will occur on 2304 Sep 15, lasting 103 minutes, 54 seconds.	1709 Sep 19	2088 May 05	2214 Jul 22	2250 Aug 13
The greatest eclipse of the series will occur on 2304 Sep 15, lasting 103 minutes, 54 seconds.	Last			
The greatest eclipse of the series will occur on 2304 Sep 15, lasting 103 minutes, 54 seconds.	Central	Total	Partial	Penumbral
The greatest eclipse of the series will occur on 2304 Sep 15, lasting 103 minutes, 54 seconds.	2448 Dec 10	2665 Apr 21	2827 Jul 29	3007 Nov 17

Eclipses are tabulated in three columns; every third eclipse in the same column is one exeligmos apart, so they all cast shadows over approximately the same parts of the Earth.

Series members 7–28 occur between 1801 and 2200:
7	8	9
1817 Nov 23	1835 Dec 05	1853 Dec 15
10	11	12
1871 Dec 26	1890 Jan 06	1908 Jan 18
13	14	15
1926 Jan 28	1944 Feb 09	1962 Feb 19
16	17	18
1980 Mar 01	1998 Mar 13	2016 Mar 23
19	20	21
2034 Apr 03	2052 Apr 14	2070 Apr 25
22	23	24
2088 May 05	2106 May 17	2124 May 28
25	26	27
2142 Jun 08	2160 Jun 18	2178 Jun 30
28
2196 Jul 10

=== Tritos series ===
This eclipse is a part of a tritos cycle, repeating at alternating nodes every 135 synodic months (≈ 3986.63 days, or 11 years minus 1 month). Their appearance and longitude are irregular due to a lack of synchronization with the anomalistic month (period of perigee), but groupings of 3 tritos cycles (≈ 33 years minus 3 months) come close (≈ 434.044 anomalistic months), so eclipses are similar in these groupings.

Series members between 1801 and 2200
1808 Nov 03 (Saros 123)	1819 Oct 03 (Saros 124)	1830 Sep 02 (Saros 125)	1841 Aug 02 (Saros 126)	1852 Jul 01 (Saros 127)
1863 Jun 01 (Saros 128)	1874 May 01 (Saros 129)	1885 Mar 30 (Saros 130)	1896 Feb 28 (Saros 131)	1907 Jan 29 (Saros 132)
1917 Dec 28 (Saros 133)	1928 Nov 27 (Saros 134)	1939 Oct 28 (Saros 135)	1950 Sep 26 (Saros 136)	1961 Aug 26 (Saros 137)
1972 Jul 26 (Saros 138)	1983 Jun 25 (Saros 139)	1994 May 25 (Saros 140)	2005 Apr 24 (Saros 141)	2016 Mar 23 (Saros 142)
2027 Feb 20 (Saros 143)	2038 Jan 21 (Saros 144)	2048 Dec 20 (Saros 145)	2059 Nov 19 (Saros 146)	2070 Oct 19 (Saros 147)
2081 Sep 18 (Saros 148)	2092 Aug 17 (Saros 149)	2103 Jul 19 (Saros 150)	2114 Jun 18 (Saros 151)	2125 May 17 (Saros 152)
2136 Apr 16 (Saros 153)			2169 Jan 13 (Saros 156)	
2190 Nov 12 (Saros 158)

=== Inex series ===
This eclipse is a part of the long period inex cycle, repeating at alternating nodes, every 358 synodic months (≈ 10,571.95 days, or 29 years minus 20 days). Their appearance and longitude are irregular due to a lack of synchronization with the anomalistic month (period of perigee). However, groupings of 3 inex cycles (≈ 87 years minus 2 months) comes close (≈ 1,151.02 anomalistic months), so eclipses are similar in these groupings.

Series members between 1801 and 2200
1813 Aug 12 (Saros 135)	1842 Jul 22 (Saros 136)	1871 Jul 02 (Saros 137)
1900 Jun 13 (Saros 138)	1929 May 23 (Saros 139)	1958 May 03 (Saros 140)
1987 Apr 14 (Saros 141)	2016 Mar 23 (Saros 142)	2045 Mar 03 (Saros 143)
2074 Feb 11 (Saros 144)	2103 Jan 23 (Saros 145)	2132 Jan 02 (Saros 146)
2160 Dec 13 (Saros 147)	2189 Nov 22 (Saros 148)	

=== Half-Saros cycle ===
A lunar eclipse will be preceded and followed by solar eclipses by 9 years and 5.5 days (a half saros). This lunar eclipse is related to two partial solar eclipses of Solar Saros 149.

March 19, 2007	March 29, 2025

== See also ==
- August 2016 lunar eclipse, the second 2016 lunar eclipse (penumbral)
- September 2016 lunar eclipse, the third 2016 lunar eclipse (penumbral)
- List of lunar eclipses and List of 21st-century lunar eclipses
