= August 2055 lunar eclipse =

Astronomical event

- Partial eclipse
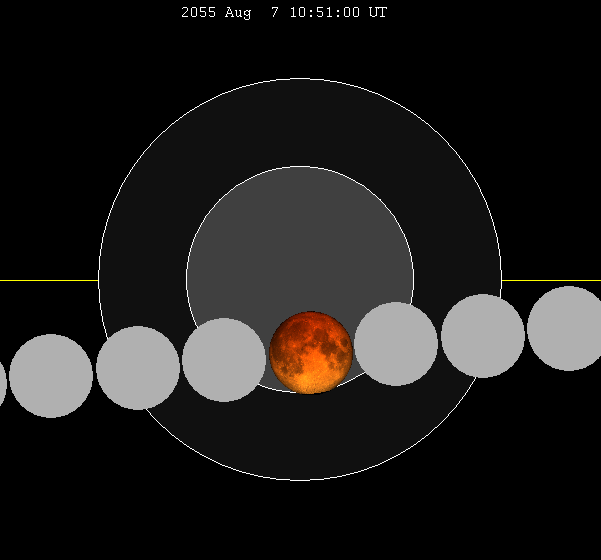
- The Moon's hourly motion shown right to left
- Date: August 7, 2055
- Gamma: −0.4769
- Magnitude: 0.9606
- Saros cycle: 139 (22 of 79)
- Partiality: 203 minutes, 23 seconds
- Penumbral: 346 minutes, 20 seconds
Contacts (UTC)
- P1: 7:58:25
- U1: 9:09:50
- Greatest: 10:53:18
- U4: 12:33:13
- P4: 13:44:45

A partial lunar eclipse will occur at the Moon’s descending node of orbit on Saturday, August 7, 2055, with an umbral magnitude of 0.9606. A lunar eclipse occurs when the Moon moves into the Earth's shadow, causing the Moon to be darkened. A partial lunar eclipse occurs when one part of the Moon is in the Earth's umbra, while the other part is in the Earth's penumbra. Unlike a solar eclipse, which can only be viewed from a relatively small area of the world, a lunar eclipse may be viewed from anywhere on the night side of Earth. Occurring about 4.4 days before apogee (on August 11, 2055, at 21:00 UTC), the Moon's apparent diameter will be smaller.

This lunar eclipse will be the last of an almost tetrad, with the others being on February 22, 2054 (total); August 18, 2054 (total); and February 11, 2055 (total).

The eclipse will last 3 hours, 23 minutes, and 23 seconds, and it will also be the last of the first set of partial eclipses in Lunar Saros 139.

== Visibility ==
The eclipse will be completely visible over eastern Australia, Antarctica, and the central and eastern Pacific Ocean, seen rising over east Asia and western Australia and setting over North and South America.

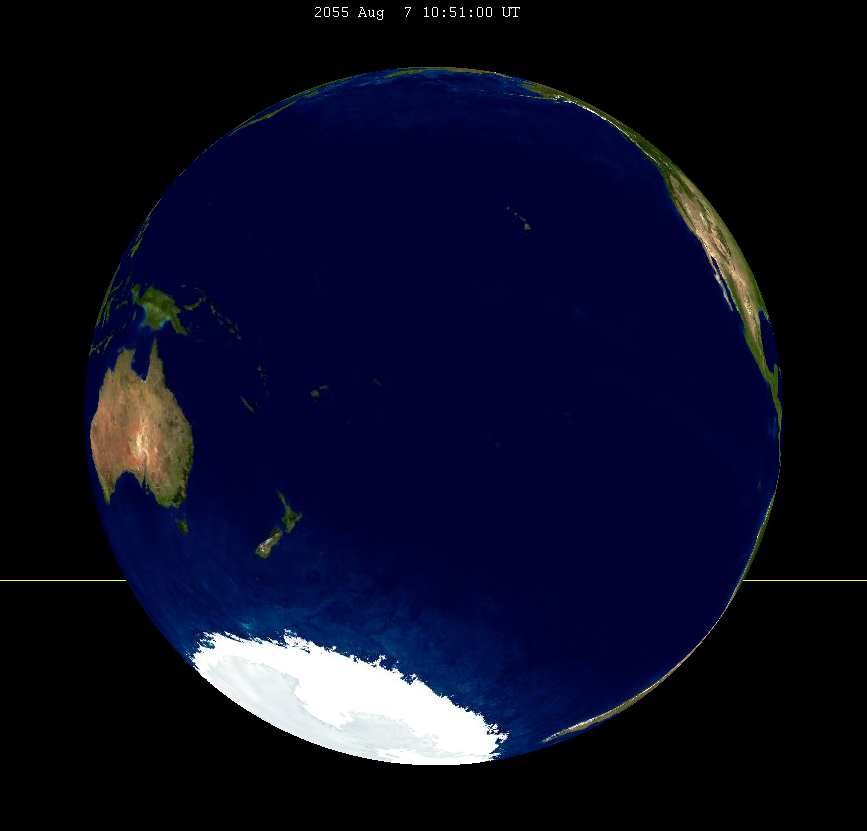
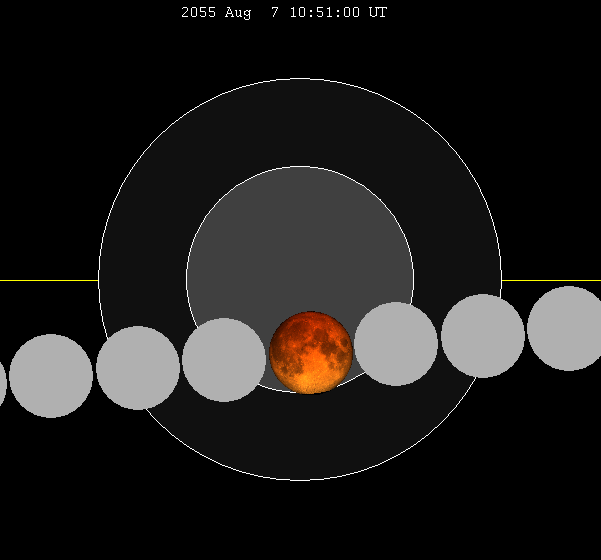

== Eclipse details ==
Shown below is a table displaying details about this particular solar eclipse. It describes various parameters pertaining to this eclipse.

August 7, 2055 Lunar Eclipse Parameters
Parameter	Value
Penumbral Magnitude	2.00808
Umbral Magnitude	0.96059
Gamma	−0.47690
Sun Right Ascension	09h09m39.9s
Sun Declination	+16°20'36.9"
Sun Semi-Diameter	15'46.2"
Sun Equatorial Horizontal Parallax	08.7"
Moon Right Ascension	21h10m01.5s
Moon Declination	-16°46'26.9"
Moon Semi-Diameter	15'03.3"
Moon Equatorial Horizontal Parallax	0°55'15.1"
ΔT	88.8 s

== Eclipse season ==
This eclipse is part of an eclipse season, a period, roughly every six months, when eclipses occur. Only two (or occasionally three) eclipse seasons occur each year, and each season lasts about 35 days and repeats just short of six months (173 days) later; thus two full eclipse seasons always occur each year. Either two or three eclipses happen each eclipse season. In the sequence below, each eclipse is separated by a fortnight.

Eclipse season of July–August 2055
July 24 Ascending node (new moon)	August 7 Descending node (full moon)
Total solar eclipse Solar Saros 127	Partial lunar eclipse Lunar Saros 139

== Related eclipses ==
=== Eclipses in 2055 ===
- A partial solar eclipse on January 27.
- A total lunar eclipse on February 11.
- A total solar eclipse on July 24.
- A partial lunar eclipse on August 7.

=== Metonic ===
- Preceded by: Lunar eclipse of October 19, 2051
- Followed by: Lunar eclipse of May 27, 2059

=== Tzolkinex ===
- Preceded by: Lunar eclipse of June 26, 2048
- Followed by: Lunar eclipse of September 18, 2062

=== Half-Saros ===
- Preceded by: Solar eclipse of August 2, 2046
- Followed by: Solar eclipse of August 12, 2064

=== Tritos ===
- Preceded by: Lunar eclipse of September 7, 2044
- Followed by: Lunar eclipse of July 7, 2066

=== Lunar Saros 139 ===
- Preceded by: Lunar eclipse of July 27, 2037
- Followed by: Lunar eclipse of August 17, 2073

=== Inex ===
- Preceded by: Lunar eclipse of August 28, 2026
- Followed by: Lunar eclipse of July 17, 2084

=== Triad ===
- Preceded by: Lunar eclipse of October 6, 1968
- Followed by: Lunar eclipse of June 8, 2142

=== Lunar eclipses of 2053–2056 ===
This eclipse is a member of a semester series. An eclipse in a semester series of lunar eclipses repeats approximately every 177 days and 4 hours (a semester) at alternating nodes of the Moon's orbit.

The penumbral lunar eclipses on June 27, 2056 and December 22, 2056 occur in the next lunar year eclipse set.

Lunar eclipse series sets from 2053 to 2056
Ascending node				Descending node			
Saros	Date Viewing	Type Chart	Gamma	Saros	Date Viewing	Type Chart	Gamma
114	2053 Mar 04	Penumbral	−1.0530	119	2053 Aug 29	Penumbral	1.0165
124	2054 Feb 22	Total	−0.3242	129	2054 Aug 18	Total	0.2806
134	2055 Feb 11	Total	0.3526	139	2055 Aug 07	Partial	−0.4769
144	2056 Feb 01	Penumbral	1.0682	149	2056 Jul 26	Partial	−1.2048

=== Saros 139 ===
This eclipse is a part of Saros series 139, repeating every 18 years, 11 days, and containing 79 events. The series started with a penumbral lunar eclipse on December 9, 1658. It contains partial eclipses from June 3, 1947 through August 7, 2055; total eclipses from August 17, 2073 through May 30, 2542; and a second set of partial eclipses from June 9, 2560 through August 25, 2686. The series ends at member 75 as a penumbral eclipse on April 13, 3065.

The longest duration of totality will be produced by member 31 at 102 minutes, 39 seconds on November 2, 2199. All eclipses in this series occur at the Moon’s descending node of orbit.

Greatest	First			
The greatest eclipse of the series will occur on 2199 Nov 02, lasting 102 minutes, 39 seconds.	Penumbral	Partial	Total	Central
The greatest eclipse of the series will occur on 2199 Nov 02, lasting 102 minutes, 39 seconds.	1658 Dec 09	1947 Jun 03	2073 Aug 17	2109 Sep 09
The greatest eclipse of the series will occur on 2199 Nov 02, lasting 102 minutes, 39 seconds.	Last			
The greatest eclipse of the series will occur on 2199 Nov 02, lasting 102 minutes, 39 seconds.	Central	Total	Partial	Penumbral
The greatest eclipse of the series will occur on 2199 Nov 02, lasting 102 minutes, 39 seconds.	2488 Apr 26	2542 May 30	2686 Aug 25	3065 Apr 13

Eclipses are tabulated in three columns; every third eclipse in the same column is one exeligmos apart, so they all cast shadows over approximately the same parts of the Earth.

Series members 9–31 occur between 1801 and 2200:
9	10	11
1803 Mar 08	1821 Mar 18	1839 Mar 30
12	13	14
1857 Apr 09	1875 Apr 20	1893 Apr 30
15	16	17
1911 May 13	1929 May 23	1947 Jun 03
18	19	20
1965 Jun 14	1983 Jun 25	2001 Jul 05
21	22	23
2019 Jul 16	2037 Jul 27	2055 Aug 07
24	25	26
2073 Aug 17	2091 Aug 29	2109 Sep 09
27	28	29
2127 Sep 20	2145 Sep 30	2163 Oct 12
30	31	
2181 Oct 22	2199 Nov 02	

=== Tritos series ===
This eclipse is a part of a tritos cycle, repeating at alternating nodes every 135 synodic months (≈ 3986.63 days, or 11 years minus 1 month). Their appearance and longitude are irregular due to a lack of synchronization with the anomalistic month (period of perigee), but groupings of 3 tritos cycles (≈ 33 years minus 3 months) come close (≈ 434.044 anomalistic months), so eclipses are similar in these groupings.

Series members between 1801 and 2200
1804 Jul 22 (Saros 116)	1815 Jun 21 (Saros 117)	1826 May 21 (Saros 118)	1837 Apr 20 (Saros 119)	1848 Mar 19 (Saros 120)
1859 Feb 17 (Saros 121)	1870 Jan 17 (Saros 122)	1880 Dec 16 (Saros 123)	1891 Nov 16 (Saros 124)	1902 Oct 17 (Saros 125)
1913 Sep 15 (Saros 126)	1924 Aug 14 (Saros 127)	1935 Jul 16 (Saros 128)	1946 Jun 14 (Saros 129)	1957 May 13 (Saros 130)
1968 Apr 13 (Saros 131)	1979 Mar 13 (Saros 132)	1990 Feb 09 (Saros 133)	2001 Jan 09 (Saros 134)	2011 Dec 10 (Saros 135)
2022 Nov 08 (Saros 136)	2033 Oct 08 (Saros 137)	2044 Sep 07 (Saros 138)	2055 Aug 07 (Saros 139)	2066 Jul 07 (Saros 140)
2077 Jun 06 (Saros 141)	2088 May 05 (Saros 142)	2099 Apr 05 (Saros 143)	2110 Mar 06 (Saros 144)	2121 Feb 02 (Saros 145)
2132 Jan 02 (Saros 146)	2142 Dec 03 (Saros 147)	2153 Nov 01 (Saros 148)	2164 Sep 30 (Saros 149)	2175 Aug 31 (Saros 150)
2186 Jul 31 (Saros 151)	2197 Jun 29 (Saros 152)			

=== Inex series ===
This eclipse is a part of the long period inex cycle, repeating at alternating nodes, every 358 synodic months (≈ 10,571.95 days, or 29 years minus 20 days). Their appearance and longitude are irregular due to a lack of synchronization with the anomalistic month (period of perigee). However, groupings of 3 inex cycles (≈ 87 years minus 2 months) comes close (≈ 1,151.02 anomalistic months), so eclipses are similar in these groupings.

Series members between 1801 and 2200
1824 Jan 16 (Saros 131)	1852 Dec 26 (Saros 132)	1881 Dec 05 (Saros 133)
1910 Nov 17 (Saros 134)	1939 Oct 28 (Saros 135)	1968 Oct 06 (Saros 136)
1997 Sep 16 (Saros 137)	2026 Aug 28 (Saros 138)	2055 Aug 07 (Saros 139)
2084 Jul 17 (Saros 140)	2113 Jun 29 (Saros 141)	2142 Jun 08 (Saros 142)
2171 May 19 (Saros 143)	2200 Apr 30 (Saros 144)	

=== Half-Saros cycle ===
A lunar eclipse will be preceded and followed by solar eclipses by 9 years and 5.5 days (a half saros). This lunar eclipse is related to two total solar eclipses of Solar Saros 146.

August 2, 2046	August 12, 2064
