= June 1947 lunar eclipse =

Partial lunar eclipse June 3, 1947

- Partial eclipse
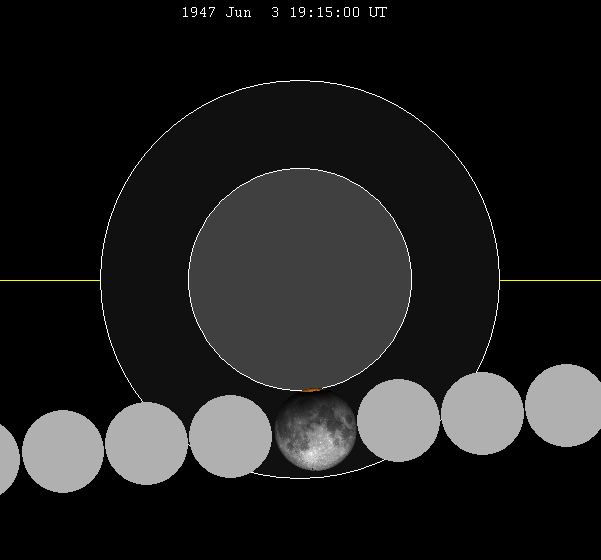
- The Moon's hourly motion shown right to left
- Date: June 3, 1947
- Gamma: −0.9850
- Magnitude: 0.0202
- Saros cycle: 139 (18 of 81)
- Partiality: 34 minutes, 42 seconds
- Penumbral: 288 minutes, 53 seconds
Contacts (UTC)
- P1: 16:50:48
- U1: 18:57:51
- Greatest: 19:15:16
- U4: 19:32:33
- P4: 21:39:42

A partial lunar eclipse occurred at the Moon’s descending node of orbit on Tuesday, June 3, 1947, with an umbral magnitude of 0.0202. A lunar eclipse occurs when the Moon moves into the Earth's shadow, causing the Moon to be darkened. A partial lunar eclipse occurs when one part of the Moon is in the Earth's umbra, while the other part is in the Earth's penumbra. Unlike a solar eclipse, which can only be viewed from a relatively small area of the world, a lunar eclipse may be viewed from anywhere on the night side of Earth. Occurring about 3.2 days before apogee (on June 6, 1947, at 23:00 UTC), the Moon's apparent diameter was smaller.

== Visibility ==
The eclipse was completely visible over east and southern Africa, west, central, and south Asia, western Australia, and Antarctica, seen rising over Europe, west Africa, and eastern South America and setting over east Asia and eastern Australia.

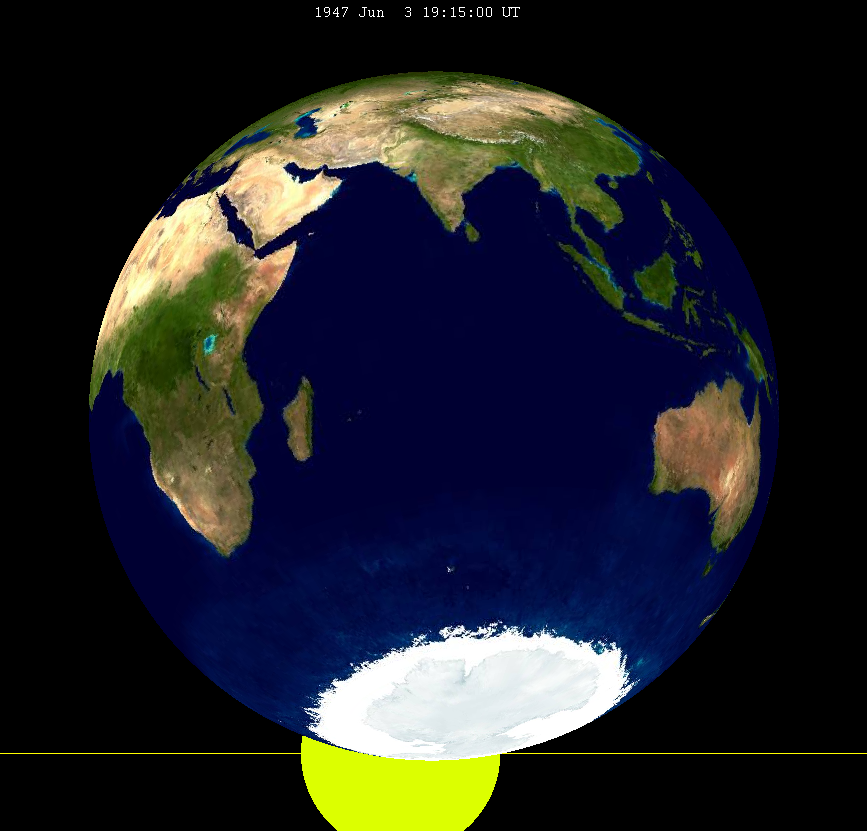
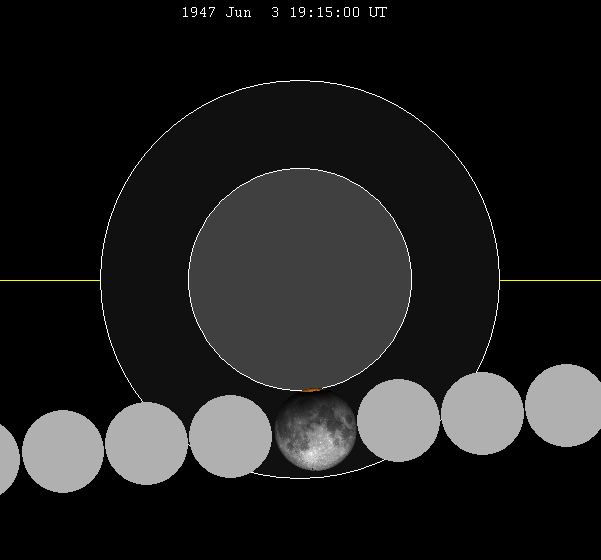

== Eclipse details ==
Shown below is a table displaying details about this particular lunar eclipse. It describes various parameters pertaining to this eclipse.

June 3, 1947 Lunar Eclipse Parameters
Parameter	Value
Penumbral Magnitude	1.08185
Umbral Magnitude	0.02016
Gamma	−0.98496
Sun Right Ascension	04h43m31.4s
Sun Declination	+22°17'00.3"
Sun Semi-Diameter	15'46.0"
Sun Equatorial Horizontal Parallax	08.7"
Moon Right Ascension	16h42m38.4s
Moon Declination	-23°09'16.1"
Moon Semi-Diameter	14'51.0"
Moon Equatorial Horizontal Parallax	0°54'30.0"
ΔT	28.0 s

== Eclipse season ==
This eclipse is part of an eclipse season, a period, roughly every six months, when eclipses occur. Only two (or occasionally three) eclipse seasons occur each year, and each season lasts about 35 days and repeats just short of six months (173 days) later; thus two full eclipse seasons always occur each year. Either two or three eclipses happen each eclipse season. In the sequence below, each eclipse is separated by a fortnight.

Eclipse season of May–June 1947
May 20 Ascending node (new moon)	June 3 Descending node (full moon)
Total solar eclipse Solar Saros 127	Partial lunar eclipse Lunar Saros 139

== Related eclipses ==
=== Eclipses in 1947 ===
- A total solar eclipse on May 20.
- A partial lunar eclipse on June 3.
- An annular solar eclipse on November 12.
- A penumbral lunar eclipse on November 28.

=== Metonic ===
- Preceded by: Lunar eclipse of August 15, 1943
- Followed by: Lunar eclipse of March 23, 1951

=== Tzolkinex ===
- Preceded by: Lunar eclipse of April 22, 1940
- Followed by: Lunar eclipse of July 16, 1954

=== Half-Saros ===
- Preceded by: Solar eclipse of May 29, 1938
- Followed by: Solar eclipse of June 8, 1956

=== Tritos ===
- Preceded by: Lunar eclipse of July 4, 1936
- Followed by: Lunar eclipse of May 3, 1958

=== Lunar Saros 139 ===
- Preceded by: Lunar eclipse of May 23, 1929
- Followed by: Lunar eclipse of June 14, 1965

=== Inex ===
- Preceded by: Lunar eclipse of June 24, 1918
- Followed by: Lunar eclipse of May 13, 1976

=== Triad ===
- Preceded by: Lunar eclipse of August 1, 1860
- Followed by: Lunar eclipse of April 3, 2034

=== Lunar eclipses of 1944–1947 ===
This eclipse is a member of a semester series. An eclipse in a semester series of lunar eclipses repeats approximately every 177 days and 4 hours (a semester) at alternating nodes of the Moon's orbit.

The penumbral lunar eclipses on February 9, 1944 and August 4, 1944 occur in the previous lunar year eclipse set.

Lunar eclipse series sets from 1944 to 1947
Descending node				Ascending node			
Saros	Date Viewing	Type Chart	Gamma	Saros	Date Viewing	Type Chart	Gamma
109	1944 Jul 06	Penumbral	1.2597	114	1944 Dec 29	Penumbral	−1.0115
119	1945 Jun 25	Partial	0.5370	124	1945 Dec 19	Total	−0.2845
129	1946 Jun 14	Total	−0.2324	134	1946 Dec 08	Total	0.3864
139	1947 Jun 03	Partial	−0.9850	144	1947 Nov 28	Penumbral	1.0838

=== Saros 139 ===
This eclipse is a part of Saros series 139, repeating every 18 years, 11 days, and containing 79 events. The series started with a penumbral lunar eclipse on December 9, 1658. It contains partial eclipses from June 3, 1947 through August 7, 2055; total eclipses from August 17, 2073 through May 30, 2542; and a second set of partial eclipses from June 9, 2560 through August 25, 2686. The series ends at member 75 as a penumbral eclipse on April 13, 3065.

The longest duration of totality will be produced by member 31 at 102 minutes, 39 seconds on November 2, 2199. All eclipses in this series occur at the Moon’s descending node of orbit.

Greatest	First			
The greatest eclipse of the series will occur on 2199 Nov 02, lasting 102 minutes, 39 seconds.	Penumbral	Partial	Total	Central
The greatest eclipse of the series will occur on 2199 Nov 02, lasting 102 minutes, 39 seconds.	1658 Dec 09	1947 Jun 03	2073 Aug 17	2109 Sep 09
The greatest eclipse of the series will occur on 2199 Nov 02, lasting 102 minutes, 39 seconds.	Last			
The greatest eclipse of the series will occur on 2199 Nov 02, lasting 102 minutes, 39 seconds.	Central	Total	Partial	Penumbral
The greatest eclipse of the series will occur on 2199 Nov 02, lasting 102 minutes, 39 seconds.	2488 Apr 26	2542 May 30	2686 Aug 25	3065 Apr 13

Eclipses are tabulated in three columns; every third eclipse in the same column is one exeligmos apart, so they all cast shadows over approximately the same parts of the Earth.

Series members 9–31 occur between 1801 and 2200:
9	10	11
1803 Mar 08	1821 Mar 18	1839 Mar 30
12	13	14
1857 Apr 09	1875 Apr 20	1893 Apr 30
15	16	17
1911 May 13	1929 May 23	1947 Jun 03
18	19	20
1965 Jun 14	1983 Jun 25	2001 Jul 05
21	22	23
2019 Jul 16	2037 Jul 27	2055 Aug 07
24	25	26
2073 Aug 17	2091 Aug 29	2109 Sep 09
27	28	29
2127 Sep 20	2145 Sep 30	2163 Oct 12
30	31	
2181 Oct 22	2199 Nov 02	

=== Tritos series ===
This eclipse is a part of a tritos cycle, repeating at alternating nodes every 135 synodic months (≈ 3986.63 days, or 11 years minus 1 month). Their appearance and longitude are irregular due to a lack of synchronization with the anomalistic month (period of perigee), but groupings of 3 tritos cycles (≈ 33 years minus 3 months) come close (≈ 434.044 anomalistic months), so eclipses are similar in these groupings.

Series members between 1801 and 2132
1805 Jul 11 (Saros 126)	1816 Jun 10 (Saros 127)	1827 May 11 (Saros 128)	1838 Apr 10 (Saros 129)	1849 Mar 09 (Saros 130)
1860 Feb 07 (Saros 131)	1871 Jan 06 (Saros 132)	1881 Dec 05 (Saros 133)	1892 Nov 04 (Saros 134)	1903 Oct 06 (Saros 135)
1914 Sep 04 (Saros 136)	1925 Aug 04 (Saros 137)	1936 Jul 04 (Saros 138)	1947 Jun 03 (Saros 139)	1958 May 03 (Saros 140)
1969 Apr 02 (Saros 141)	1980 Mar 01 (Saros 142)	1991 Jan 30 (Saros 143)	2001 Dec 30 (Saros 144)	2012 Nov 28 (Saros 145)
2023 Oct 28 (Saros 146)	2034 Sep 28 (Saros 147)	2045 Aug 27 (Saros 148)	2056 Jul 26 (Saros 149)	2067 Jun 27 (Saros 150)
2132 Dec 22 (Saros 156)

=== Inex series ===
This eclipse is a part of the long period inex cycle, repeating at alternating nodes, every 358 synodic months (≈ 10,571.95 days, or 29 years minus 20 days). Their appearance and longitude are irregular due to a lack of synchronization with the anomalistic month (period of perigee). However, groupings of 3 inex cycles (≈ 87 years minus 2 months) comes close (≈ 1,151.02 anomalistic months), so eclipses are similar in these groupings.

Series members between 1801 and 2200
1802 Sep 11 (Saros 134)	1831 Aug 23 (Saros 135)	1860 Aug 01 (Saros 136)
1889 Jul 12 (Saros 137)	1918 Jun 24 (Saros 138)	1947 Jun 03 (Saros 139)
1976 May 13 (Saros 140)	2005 Apr 24 (Saros 141)	2034 Apr 03 (Saros 142)
2063 Mar 14 (Saros 143)	2092 Feb 23 (Saros 144)	2121 Feb 02 (Saros 145)
2150 Jan 13 (Saros 146)	2178 Dec 24 (Saros 147)	

=== Half-Saros cycle ===
A lunar eclipse will be preceded and followed by solar eclipses by 9 years and 5.5 days (a half saros). This lunar eclipse is related to two total solar eclipses of Solar Saros 146.

May 29, 1938	June 8, 1956

== See also ==
- List of lunar eclipses
- List of 20th-century lunar eclipses
