= July 2037 lunar eclipse =

Astronomical event

- Partial eclipse
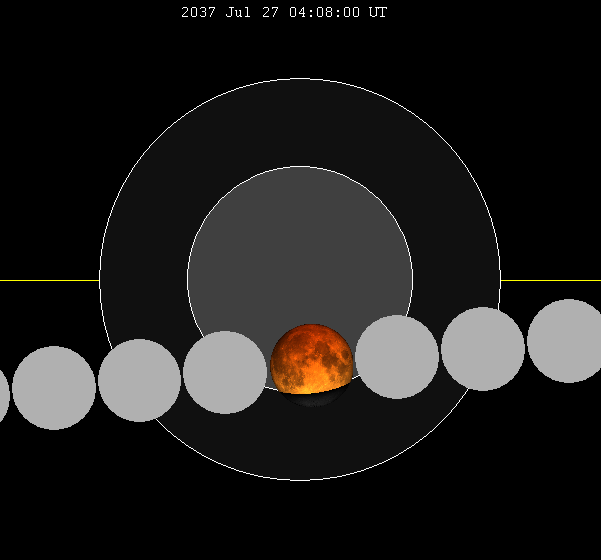
- The Moon's hourly motion shown right to left
- Date: July 27, 2037
- Gamma: −0.5582
- Magnitude: 0.8108
- Saros cycle: 139 (23 of 81)
- Partiality: 192 minutes, 25 seconds
- Penumbral: 340 minutes, 49 seconds
Contacts (UTC)
- P1: 1:19:29
- U1: 2:33:41
- Greatest: 4:09:53
- U4: 5:46:05
- P4: 7:00:17

A partial lunar eclipse will occur at the Moon’s descending node of orbit on Monday, July 27, 2037, with an umbral magnitude of 0.8108. A lunar eclipse occurs when the Moon moves into the Earth's shadow, causing the Moon to be darkened. A partial lunar eclipse occurs when one part of the Moon is in the Earth's umbra, while the other part is in the Earth's penumbra. Unlike a solar eclipse, which can only be viewed from a relatively small area of the world, a lunar eclipse may be viewed from anywhere on the night side of Earth. Occurring about 4.1 days before apogee (on July 31, 2037, at 8:30 UTC), the Moon's apparent diameter will be smaller.

== Visibility ==
The eclipse will be completely visible over eastern North America and South America, seen rising over western North America and the eastern Pacific Ocean and setting over Africa and Europe.

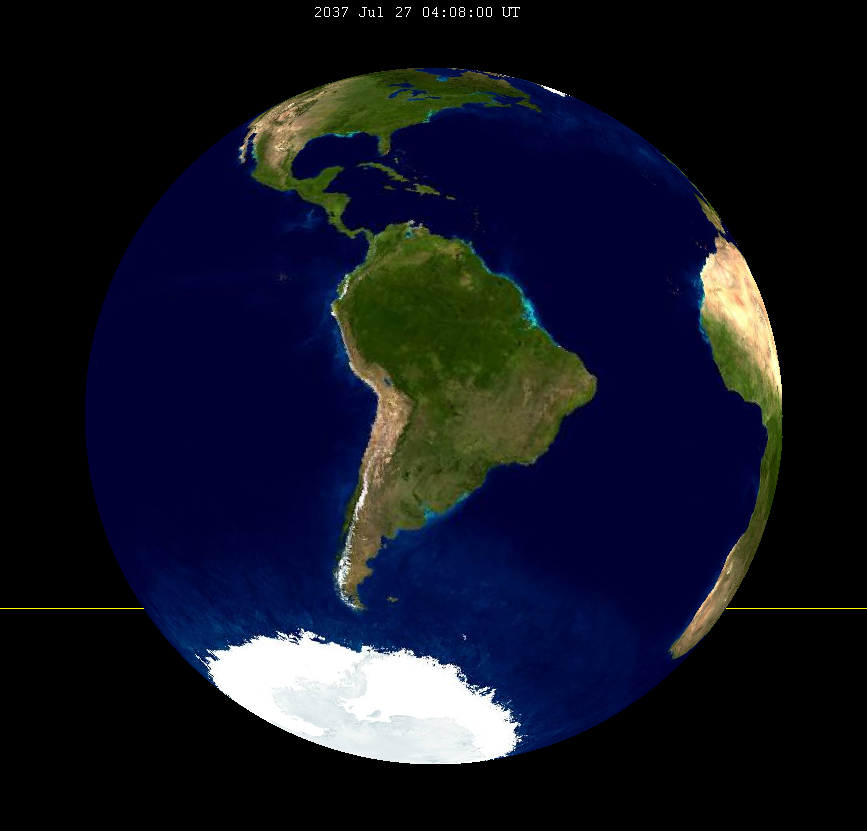
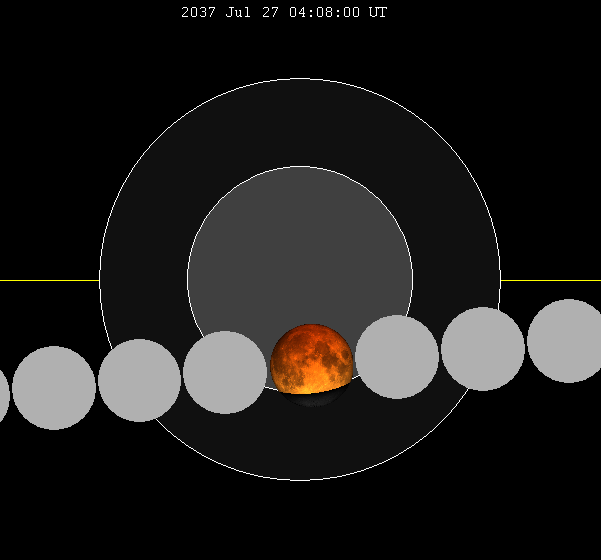

== Eclipse details ==
Shown below is a table displaying details about this particular solar eclipse. It describes various parameters pertaining to this eclipse.

July 27, 2037 Lunar Eclipse Parameters
Parameter	Value
Penumbral Magnitude	1.85965
Umbral Magnitude	0.81075
Gamma	−0.55822
Sun Right Ascension	08h27m18.9s
Sun Declination	+19°07'58.8"
Sun Semi-Diameter	15'45.0"
Sun Equatorial Horizontal Parallax	08.7"
Moon Right Ascension	20h27m37.3s
Moon Declination	-19°38'25.9"
Moon Semi-Diameter	15'00.9"
Moon Equatorial Horizontal Parallax	0°55'06.5"
ΔT	77.8 s

== Eclipse season ==
This eclipse is part of an eclipse season, a period, roughly every six months, when eclipses occur. Only two (or occasionally three) eclipse seasons occur each year, and each season lasts about 35 days and repeats just short of six months (173 days) later; thus two full eclipse seasons always occur each year. Either two or three eclipses happen each eclipse season. In the sequence below, each eclipse is separated by a fortnight.

Eclipse season of July 2037
July 13 Ascending node (new moon)	July 27 Descending node (full moon)
Total solar eclipse Solar Saros 127	Partial lunar eclipse Lunar Saros 139

== Related eclipses ==
=== Eclipses in 2037 ===
- A partial solar eclipse on January 16.
- A total lunar eclipse on January 31.
- A total solar eclipse on July 13.
- A partial lunar eclipse on July 27.

=== Metonic ===
- Preceded by: Lunar eclipse of October 8, 2033
- Followed by: Lunar eclipse of May 16, 2041

=== Tzolkinex ===
- Preceded by: Lunar eclipse of June 15, 2030
- Followed by: Lunar eclipse of September 7, 2044

=== Half-Saros ===
- Preceded by: Solar eclipse of July 22, 2028
- Followed by: Solar eclipse of August 2, 2046

=== Tritos ===
- Preceded by: Lunar eclipse of August 28, 2026
- Followed by: Lunar eclipse of June 26, 2048

=== Lunar Saros 139 ===
- Preceded by: Lunar eclipse of July 16, 2019
- Followed by: Lunar eclipse of August 7, 2055

=== Inex ===
- Preceded by: Lunar eclipse of August 16, 2008
- Followed by: Lunar eclipse of July 7, 2066

=== Triad ===
- Preceded by: Lunar eclipse of September 26, 1950
- Followed by: Lunar eclipse of May 28, 2124

=== Lunar eclipses of 2035–2038 ===
This eclipse is a member of a semester series. An eclipse in a semester series of lunar eclipses repeats approximately every 177 days and 4 hours (a semester) at alternating nodes of the Moon's orbit.

The penumbral lunar eclipses on June 17, 2038 and December 11, 2038 occur in the next lunar year eclipse set.

Lunar eclipse series sets from 2035 to 2038
Ascending node				Descending node			
Saros	Date Viewing	Type Chart	Gamma	Saros	Date Viewing	Type Chart	Gamma
114	2035 Feb 22	Penumbral	−1.0357	119	2035 Aug 19	Partial	0.9433
124	2036 Feb 11	Total	−0.3110	129	2036 Aug 07	Total	0.2004
134	2037 Jan 31	Total	0.3619	139	2037 Jul 27	Partial	−0.5582
144	2038 Jan 21	Penumbral	1.0710	149	2038 Jul 16	Penumbral	−1.2837

=== Saros 139 ===
This eclipse is a part of Saros series 139, repeating every 18 years, 11 days, and containing 79 events. The series started with a penumbral lunar eclipse on December 9, 1658. It contains partial eclipses from June 3, 1947 through August 7, 2055; total eclipses from August 17, 2073 through May 30, 2542; and a second set of partial eclipses from June 9, 2560 through August 25, 2686. The series ends at member 75 as a penumbral eclipse on April 13, 3065.

The longest duration of totality will be produced by member 31 at 102 minutes, 39 seconds on November 2, 2199. All eclipses in this series occur at the Moon’s descending node of orbit.

Greatest	First			
The greatest eclipse of the series will occur on 2199 Nov 02, lasting 102 minutes, 39 seconds.	Penumbral	Partial	Total	Central
The greatest eclipse of the series will occur on 2199 Nov 02, lasting 102 minutes, 39 seconds.	1658 Dec 09	1947 Jun 03	2073 Aug 17	2109 Sep 09
The greatest eclipse of the series will occur on 2199 Nov 02, lasting 102 minutes, 39 seconds.	Last			
The greatest eclipse of the series will occur on 2199 Nov 02, lasting 102 minutes, 39 seconds.	Central	Total	Partial	Penumbral
The greatest eclipse of the series will occur on 2199 Nov 02, lasting 102 minutes, 39 seconds.	2488 Apr 26	2542 May 30	2686 Aug 25	3065 Apr 13

Eclipses are tabulated in three columns; every third eclipse in the same column is one exeligmos apart, so they all cast shadows over approximately the same parts of the Earth.

Series members 9–31 occur between 1801 and 2200:
9	10	11
1803 Mar 08	1821 Mar 18	1839 Mar 30
12	13	14
1857 Apr 09	1875 Apr 20	1893 Apr 30
15	16	17
1911 May 13	1929 May 23	1947 Jun 03
18	19	20
1965 Jun 14	1983 Jun 25	2001 Jul 05
21	22	23
2019 Jul 16	2037 Jul 27	2055 Aug 07
24	25	26
2073 Aug 17	2091 Aug 29	2109 Sep 09
27	28	29
2127 Sep 20	2145 Sep 30	2163 Oct 12
30	31	
2181 Oct 22	2199 Nov 02	

=== Tritos series ===
This eclipse is a part of a tritos cycle, repeating at alternating nodes every 135 synodic months (≈ 3986.63 days, or 11 years minus 1 month). Their appearance and longitude are irregular due to a lack of synchronization with the anomalistic month (period of perigee), but groupings of 3 tritos cycles (≈ 33 years minus 3 months) come close (≈ 434.044 anomalistic months), so eclipses are similar in these groupings.

Series members between 1801 and 2200
1808 May 10 (Saros 118)	1819 Apr 10 (Saros 119)	1830 Mar 09 (Saros 120)	1841 Feb 06 (Saros 121)	1852 Jan 07 (Saros 122)
1862 Dec 06 (Saros 123)	1873 Nov 04 (Saros 124)	1884 Oct 04 (Saros 125)	1895 Sep 04 (Saros 126)	1906 Aug 04 (Saros 127)
1917 Jul 04 (Saros 128)	1928 Jun 03 (Saros 129)	1939 May 03 (Saros 130)	1950 Apr 02 (Saros 131)	1961 Mar 02 (Saros 132)
1972 Jan 30 (Saros 133)	1982 Dec 30 (Saros 134)	1993 Nov 29 (Saros 135)	2004 Oct 28 (Saros 136)	2015 Sep 28 (Saros 137)
2026 Aug 28 (Saros 138)	2037 Jul 27 (Saros 139)	2048 Jun 26 (Saros 140)	2059 May 27 (Saros 141)	2070 Apr 25 (Saros 142)
2081 Mar 25 (Saros 143)	2092 Feb 23 (Saros 144)	2103 Jan 23 (Saros 145)	2113 Dec 22 (Saros 146)	2124 Nov 21 (Saros 147)
2135 Oct 22 (Saros 148)	2146 Sep 20 (Saros 149)	2157 Aug 20 (Saros 150)	2168 Jul 20 (Saros 151)	2179 Jun 19 (Saros 152)
2190 May 19 (Saros 153)

=== Inex series ===
This eclipse is a part of the long period inex cycle, repeating at alternating nodes, every 358 synodic months (≈ 10,571.95 days, or 29 years minus 20 days). Their appearance and longitude are irregular due to a lack of synchronization with the anomalistic month (period of perigee). However, groupings of 3 inex cycles (≈ 87 years minus 2 months) comes close (≈ 1,151.02 anomalistic months), so eclipses are similar in these groupings.

Series members between 1801 and 2200
1806 Jan 05 (Saros 131)	1834 Dec 16 (Saros 132)	1863 Nov 25 (Saros 133)
1892 Nov 04 (Saros 134)	1921 Oct 16 (Saros 135)	1950 Sep 26 (Saros 136)
1979 Sep 06 (Saros 137)	2008 Aug 16 (Saros 138)	2037 Jul 27 (Saros 139)
2066 Jul 07 (Saros 140)	2095 Jun 17 (Saros 141)	2124 May 28 (Saros 142)
2153 May 08 (Saros 143)	2182 Apr 18 (Saros 144)	

=== Half-Saros cycle ===
A lunar eclipse will be preceded and followed by solar eclipses by 9 years and 5.5 days (a half saros). This lunar eclipse is related to two total solar eclipses of Solar Saros 146.

July 22, 2028	August 2, 2046

== See also ==
- List of lunar eclipses and List of 21st-century lunar eclipses
