= Lunar Saros 139 =

Eclipse cycle of the moon

Member 21
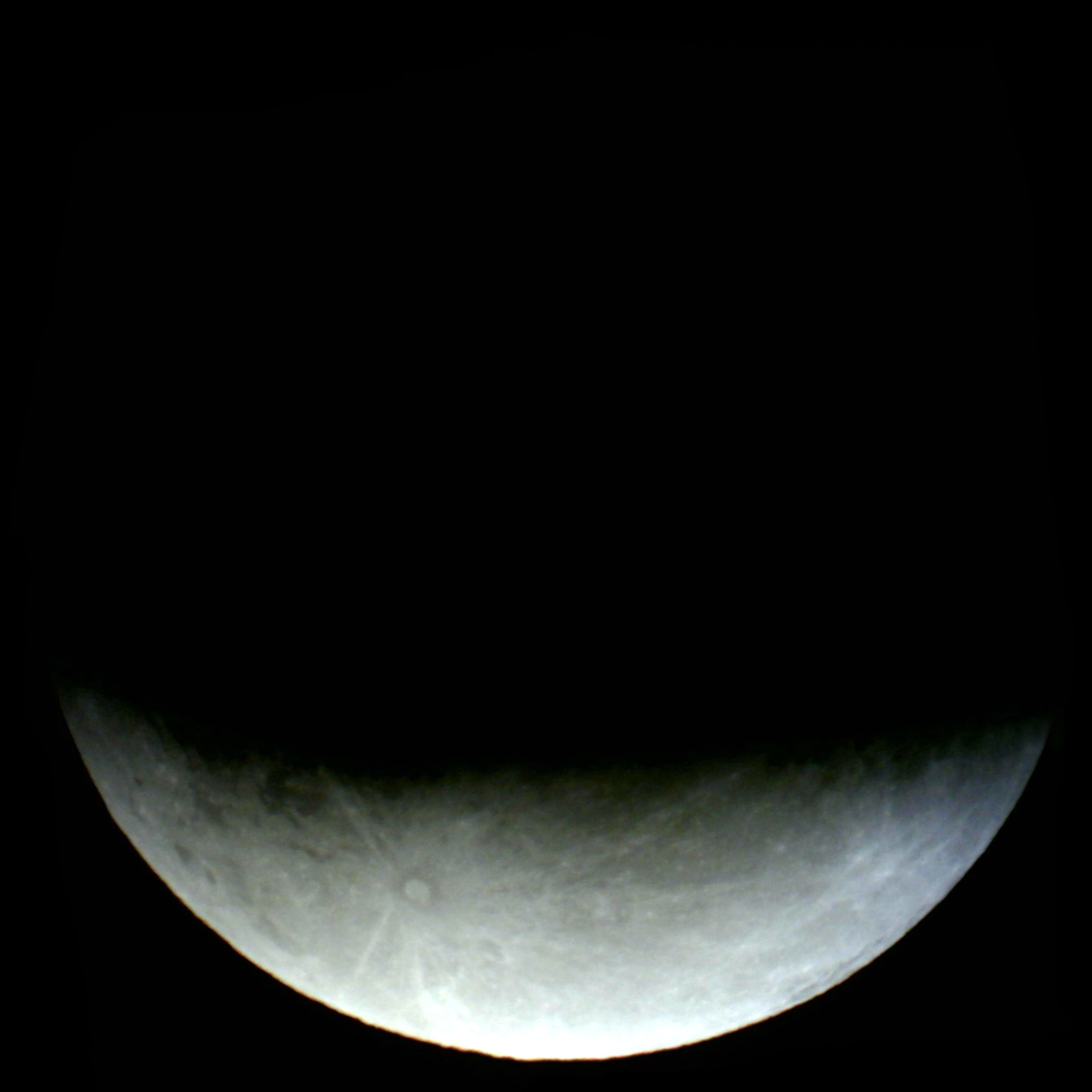
2019 Jul 16

Saros cycle series 139 for lunar eclipses occurs at the moon's descending node, repeats every 18 years 11 and 1/3 days. It contains 79 events.

== List ==
Cat.	Saros	Mem	Date	Time UT (hr:mn)	Type	Gamma	Magnitude	Duration (min)			Contacts UT (hr:mn)						Chart
Cat.	Saros	Mem	Date	Greatest	Type	Gamma	Magnitude	Pen.	Par.	Tot.	P1	P4	U1	U2	U3	U4	Chart
08811	139	1	1658 Dec 09	20:10:47	Penumbral	-1.5784	-1.0897	37.2			19:52:11	20:29:23					
08856	139	2	1676 Dec 20	4:11:44	Penumbral	-1.5710	-1.0768	52.9			3:45:17	4:38:11					
08902	139	3	1694 Dec 31	12:13:59	Penumbral	-1.5645	-1.0653	63.1			11:42:26	12:45:32					
08948	139	4	1713 Jan 11	20:14:55	Penumbral	-1.5569	-1.0513	73.0			19:38:25	20:51:25					
08995	139	5	1731 Jan 23	4:14:13	Penumbral	-1.5477	-1.0338	83.2			3:32:37	4:55:49					
09041	139	6	1749 Feb 02	12:09:42	Penumbral	-1.5351	-1.0100	95.2			11:22:06	12:57:18					
09088	139	7	1767 Feb 13	19:59:03	Penumbral	-1.5174	-0.9764	109.6			19:04:15	20:53:51					
09133	139	8	1785 Feb 24	3:42:22	Penumbral	-1.4947	-0.9331	125.5			2:39:37	4:45:07					
09178	139	9	1803 Mar 08	11:17:40	Penumbral	-1.4653	-0.8776	143.2			10:06:04	12:29:16					
09223	139	10	1821 Mar 18	18:44:59	Penumbral	-1.4293	-0.8095	161.8			17:24:05	20:05:53					
09269	139	11	1839 Mar 30	2:03:05	Penumbral	-1.3853	-0.7269	181.4			0:32:23	3:33:47					
09314	139	12	1857 Apr 09	9:13:19	Penumbral	-1.3347	-0.6318	201.0			7:32:49	10:53:49					
09358	139	13	1875 Apr 20	16:15:23	Penumbral	-1.2770	-0.5238	220.2			14:25:17	18:05:29					
09402	139	14	1893 Apr 30	23:08:58	Penumbral	-1.2119	-0.4023	239.2			21:09:22	1:08:34					
09445	139	15	1911 May 13	5:56:24	Penumbral	-1.1413	-0.2706	257.0			3:47:54	8:04:54					
09487	139	16	1929 May 23	12:37:45	Penumbral	-1.0650	-0.1287	273.7			10:20:54	14:54:36					
09529	139	17	1947 Jun 03	19:15:44	Partial	-0.9849	0.0202	288.9	34.7		16:51:17	21:40:11	18:58:23			19:33:05	
09570	139	18	1965 Jun 14	1:49:26	Partial	-0.9005	0.1767	302.7	100.3		23:18:05	4:20:47	0:59:17			2:39:35	
09611	139	19	1983 Jun 25	8:23:11	Partial	-0.8151	0.3348	314.7	134.6		5:45:50	11:00:32	7:15:53			9:30:29	
09652	139	20	2001 Jul 05	14:56:23	Partial	-0.7287	0.4947	325.1	159.3		12:13:50	17:38:56	13:36:44			16:16:02	
09693	139	21	2019 Jul 16	21:31:55	Partial	-0.6430	0.6531	333.7	177.9		18:45:04	0:18:46	20:02:58			23:00:52	
09734	139	22	2037 Jul 27	4:09:53	Partial	-0.5582	0.8095	340.8	192.4		1:19:29	7:00:17	2:33:41			5:46:05	
09774	139	23	2055 Aug 07	10:53:18	Partial	-0.4769	0.9594	346.3	203.4		8:00:09	13:46:27	9:11:36			12:35:00	
09815	139	24	2073 Aug 17	17:42:41	Total	-0.3998	1.1013	350.5	211.6	50.1	14:47:26	20:37:56	15:56:53	17:17:38	18:07:44	19:28:29	
09856	139	25	2091 Aug 29	0:38:25	Total	-0.3270	1.2351	353.4	217.5	72.9	21:41:43	3:35:07	22:49:40	0:01:58	1:14:52	2:27:10	
09899	139	26	2109 Sep 09	7:43:03	Total	-0.2608	1.3568	355.2	221.6	85.6	4:45:27	10:40:39	5:52:15	7:00:15	8:25:51	9:33:51	
09941	139	27	2127 Sep 20	14:56:04	Total	-0.2007	1.4672	356.2	224.2	93.5	11:57:58	17:54:10	13:03:58	14:09:19	15:42:49	16:48:10	
09984	139	28	2145 Sep 30	22:19:51	Total	-0.1486	1.5628	356.5	225.7	98.2	19:21:36	1:18:06	20:27:00	21:30:45	23:08:57	0:12:42	
10028	139	29	2163 Oct 12	5:51:53	Total	-0.1026	1.6471	356.3	226.3	100.9	2:53:44	8:50:02	3:58:44	5:01:26	6:42:20	7:45:02	
10071	139	30	2181 Oct 22	13:35:21	Total	-0.0652	1.7157	355.7	226.3	102.2	10:37:30	16:33:12	11:42:12	12:44:15	14:26:27	15:28:30	
10114	139	31	2199 Nov 02	21:27:11	Total	-0.0340	1.7731	354.9	226.0	102.7	18:29:44	0:24:38	19:34:11	20:35:50	22:18:32	23:20:11	
10158	139	32	2217 Nov 14	5:29:02	Total	-0.0100	1.8171	353.9	225.5	102.6	2:32:05	8:25:59	3:36:17	4:37:44	6:20:20	7:21:47	
10202	139	33	2235 Nov 25	13:38:16	Total	0.0086	1.8201	352.8	224.9	102.4	10:41:52	16:34:40	11:45:49	12:47:04	14:29:28	15:30:43	
10247	139	34	2253 Dec 05	21:55:59	Total	0.0213	1.7974	351.6	224.2	102.0	19:00:11	0:51:47	20:03:53	21:04:59	22:46:59	23:48:05	
10293	139	35	2271 Dec 17	6:18:50	Total	0.0303	1.7815	350.4	223.5	101.7	3:23:38	9:14:02	4:27:05	5:27:59	7:09:41	8:10:35	
10340	139	36	2289 Dec 27	14:46:24	Total	0.0364	1.7713	349.1	222.9	101.4	11:51:51	17:40:57	12:54:57	13:55:42	15:37:06	16:37:51	
10387	139	37	2308 Jan 08	23:16:24	Total	0.0413	1.7637	347.8	222.3	101.1	20:22:30	2:10:18	21:25:15	22:25:51	0:06:57	1:07:33	
10433	139	38	2326 Jan 19	7:48:32	Total	0.0454	1.7577	346.4	221.7	100.9	4:55:20	10:41:44	5:57:41	6:58:05	8:38:59	9:39:23	
10479	139	39	2344 Jan 30	16:18:41	Total	0.0518	1.7479	345.0	221.1	100.6	13:26:11	19:11:11	14:28:08	15:28:23	17:08:59	18:09:14	
10524	139	40	2362 Feb 10	0:47:27	Total	0.0599	1.7352	343.5	220.5	100.3	21:55:42	3:39:12	22:57:12	23:57:18	1:37:36	2:37:42	
10569	139	41	2380 Feb 21	9:11:43	Total	0.0725	1.7144	341.9	219.9	99.9	6:20:46	12:02:40	7:21:46	8:21:46	10:01:40	11:01:40	
10613	139	42	2398 Mar 03	17:32:53	Total	0.0885	1.6877	340.2	219.1	99.2	14:42:47	20:22:59	15:43:20	16:43:17	18:22:29	19:22:26	
10658	139	43	2416 Mar 14	1:45:55	Total	0.1118	1.6477	338.3	218.2	98.1	22:56:46	4:35:04	23:56:49	0:56:52	2:34:58	3:35:01	
10702	139	44	2434 Mar 25	9:54:38	Total	0.1395	1.5998	336.3	217.0	96.4	7:06:29	12:42:47	8:06:08	9:06:26	10:42:50	11:43:08	
10746	139	45	2452 Apr 04	17:54:43	Total	0.1748	1.5380	333.9	215.3	93.7	15:07:46	20:41:40	16:07:04	17:07:52	18:41:34	19:42:22	
10788	139	46	2470 Apr 16	1:49:49	Total	0.2150	1.4670	331.3	213.2	89.8	23:04:10	4:35:28	0:03:13	1:04:55	2:34:43	3:36:25	
10830	139	47	2488 Apr 26	9:36:10	Total	0.2634	1.3812	328.1	210.3	83.7	6:52:07	12:20:13	7:51:01	8:54:19	10:18:01	11:21:19	
10871	139	48	2506 May 8	17:18:30	Total	0.3158	1.2877	324.5	206.6	75.1	14:36:15	20:00:45	15:35:12	16:40:57	17:56:03	19:01:48	
10912	139	49	2524 May 19	0:54:02	Total	0.3744	1.1826	320.3	201.7	61.8	22:13:53	3:34:11	23:13:11	0:23:08	1:24:56	2:34:53	
10953	139	50	2542 May 30	8:25:22	Total	0.4375	1.0695	315.3	195.5	39.4	5:47:43	11:03:01	6:47:37	8:05:40	8:45:04	10:03:07	
10995	139	51	2560 Jun 09	15:52:08	Partial	0.5047	0.9482	309.5	187.8		13:17:23	18:26:53	14:18:14			17:26:02	
11036	139	52	2578 Jun 20	23:17:05	Partial	0.5741	0.8228	302.9	178.4		20:45:38	1:48:32	21:47:53			0:46:17	
11076	139	53	2596 Jul 01	6:40:09	Partial	0.6457	0.6930	295.3	166.9		4:12:30	9:07:48	5:16:42			8:03:36	
11116	139	54	2614 Jul 13	14:02:30	Partial	0.7183	0.5612	286.9	153.0		11:39:03	16:25:57	12:46:00			15:19:00	
11155	139	55	2632 Jul 23	21:26:01	Partial	0.7902	0.4302	277.6	136.4		19:07:13	23:44:49	20:17:49			22:34:13	
11196	139	56	2650 Aug 04	4:51:39	Partial	0.8606	0.3017	267.6	116.2		2:37:51	7:05:27	3:53:33			5:49:45	
11238	139	57	2668 Aug 14	12:20:04	Partial	0.9290	0.1766	256.9	90.3		10:11:37	14:28:31	11:34:55			13:05:13	
11281	139	58	2686 Aug 25	19:52:22	Partial	0.9946	0.0563	245.6	51.8		17:49:34	21:55:10	19:26:28			20:18:16	
11323	139	59	2704 Sep 06	3:30:17	Penumbral	1.0559	-0.0562	233.9			1:33:20	5:27:14					
11366	139	60	2722 Sep 17	11:14:28	Penumbral	1.1120	-0.1596	222.2			9:23:22	13:05:34					
11408	139	61	2740 Sep 27	19:04:39	Penumbral	1.1636	-0.2549	210.3			17:19:30	20:49:48					
11452	139	62	2758 Oct 09	3:02:58	Penumbral	1.2090	-0.3388	199.0			1:23:28	4:42:28					
11496	139	63	2776 Oct 19	11:08:55	Penumbral	1.2486	-0.4124	188.3			9:34:46	12:43:04					
11542	139	64	2794 Oct 30	19:23:28	Penumbral	1.2815	-0.4738	178.7			17:54:07	20:52:49					
11588	139	65	2812 Nov 10	3:44:37	Penumbral	1.3094	-0.5260	170.0			2:19:37	5:09:37					
11636	139	66	2830 Nov 21	12:13:59	Penumbral	1.3312	-0.5668	162.8			10:52:35	13:35:23					
11682	139	67	2848 Dec 01	20:49:50	Penumbral	1.3481	-0.5989	156.9			19:31:23	22:08:17					
11728	139	68	2866 Dec 13	5:31:19	Penumbral	1.3610	-0.6234	152.3			4:15:10	6:47:28					
11774	139	69	2884 Dec 23	14:17:44	Penumbral	1.3703	-0.6410	148.9			13:03:17	15:32:11					
11820	139	70	2903 Jan 04	23:07:17	Penumbral	1.3775	-0.6546	146.2			21:54:11	0:20:23					
11865	139	71	2921 Jan 15	7:59:27	Penumbral	1.3825	-0.6643	144.3			6:47:18	9:11:36					
11910	139	72	2939 Jan 26	16:50:38	Penumbral	1.3889	-0.6760	141.7			15:39:47	18:01:29					
11955	139	73	2957 Feb 06	1:42:04	Penumbral	1.3951	-0.6872	139.1			0:32:31	2:51:37					
12001	139	74	2975 Feb 17	10:30:03	Penumbral	1.4045	-0.7043	135.0			9:22:33	11:37:33					
12045	139	75	2993 Feb 27	19:14:41	Penumbral	1.4166	-0.7260	129.4			18:09:59	20:19:23					
–	139	76	3011 Mar 12	03:52:57	Penumbral	1.4339	-0.7571	120.9									–
–	139	77	3029 Mar 22	12:26:16	Penumbral	1.4553	-0.7956	109.3									–
–	139	78	3047 Apr 02	20:52:10	Penumbral	1.4828	-0.8454	91.9									–
–	139	79	3065 Apr 13	05:10:23	Penumbral	1.5164	-0.9063	63.9									–

== See also ==
- List of lunar eclipses
  - List of Saros series for lunar eclipses
