= July 2001 lunar eclipse =

Partial lunar eclipse 5 July 2001

- Partial eclipse
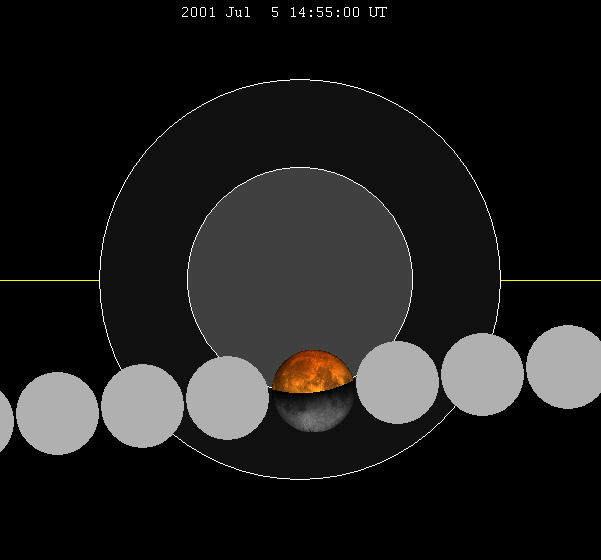
- Hourly motion shown right to left
- Date: July 5, 2001
- Gamma: −0.7287
- Magnitude: 0.4961
- Saros cycle: 139 (21 of 81)
- Partiality: 162 minutes, 52 seconds
- Penumbral: 322 minutes, 7 seconds
Contacts (UTC)
- P1: 12:12:46
- U1: 13:35:38
- Greatest: 14:55:19
- U4: 16:14:54
- P4: 17:37:52

External image
- https://stellarscenes.net/eclipse_e/le2001_01.htm

A partial lunar eclipse occurred at the Moon’s descending node of orbit on Thursday, July 5, 2001, with an umbral magnitude of 0.4961. A lunar eclipse occurs when the Moon moves into the Earth's shadow, causing the Moon to be darkened. A partial lunar eclipse occurs when one part of the Moon is in the Earth's umbra, while the other part is in the Earth's penumbra. Unlike a solar eclipse, which can only be viewed from a relatively small area of the world, a lunar eclipse may be viewed from anywhere on the night side of Earth. Occurring about 3.7 days before apogee (on July 9, 2001, at 7:20 UTC), the Moon's apparent diameter was smaller.

== Visibility ==
The eclipse was completely visible over east Asia, Australia, and Antarctica, seen rising over east Africa and west and central Asia and setting over western North America.

The moon's hourly motion across the Earth's shadow in the constellation of Sagittarius.

== Eclipse details ==
Shown below is a table displaying details about this particular lunar eclipse. It describes various parameters pertaining to this eclipse.

July 5, 2001 Lunar Eclipse Parameters
Parameter	Value
Penumbral Magnitude	1.54895
Umbral Magnitude	0.49614
Gamma	−0.72871
Sun Right Ascension	06h59m16.1s
Sun Declination	+22°44'22.5"
Sun Semi-Diameter	15'43.9"
Sun Equatorial Horizontal Parallax	08.7"
Moon Right Ascension	18h59m16.6s
Moon Declination	-23°24'20.1"
Moon Semi-Diameter	14'56.6"
Moon Equatorial Horizontal Parallax	0°54'50.4"
ΔT	64.2 s

== Eclipse season ==
This eclipse is part of an eclipse season, a period, roughly every six months, when eclipses occur. Only two (or occasionally three) eclipse seasons occur each year, and each season lasts about 35 days and repeats just short of six months (173 days) later; thus two full eclipse seasons always occur each year. Either two or three eclipses happen each eclipse season. In the sequence below, each eclipse is separated by a fortnight.

Eclipse season of June–July 2001
June 21 Ascending node (new moon)	July 5 Descending node (full moon)
Total solar eclipse Solar Saros 127	Partial lunar eclipse Lunar Saros 139

== Related eclipses ==
=== Eclipses in 2001 ===
- A total lunar eclipse on January 9.
- A total solar eclipse on June 21.
- A partial lunar eclipse on July 5.
- An annular solar eclipse on December 14.
- A penumbral lunar eclipse on December 30.

=== Metonic ===
- Preceded by: Lunar eclipse of September 16, 1997
- Followed by: Lunar eclipse of April 24, 2005

=== Tzolkinex ===
- Preceded by: Lunar eclipse of May 25, 1994
- Followed by: Lunar eclipse of August 16, 2008

=== Half-Saros ===
- Preceded by: Solar eclipse of June 30, 1992
- Followed by: Solar eclipse of July 11, 2010

=== Tritos ===
- Preceded by: Lunar eclipse of August 6, 1990
- Followed by: Lunar eclipse of June 4, 2012

=== Lunar Saros 139 ===
- Preceded by: Lunar eclipse of June 25, 1983
- Followed by: Lunar eclipse of July 16, 2019

=== Inex ===
- Preceded by: Lunar eclipse of July 26, 1972
- Followed by: Lunar eclipse of June 15, 2030

=== Triad ===
- Preceded by: Lunar eclipse of September 4, 1914
- Followed by: Lunar eclipse of May 5, 2088

=== Lunar eclipses of 1998–2002 ===
This eclipse is a member of a semester series. An eclipse in a semester series of lunar eclipses repeats approximately every 177 days and 4 hours (a semester) at alternating nodes of the Moon's orbit.

The penumbral lunar eclipses on March 13, 1998 and September 6, 1998 occur in the previous lunar year eclipse set, and the penumbral lunar eclipses on May 26, 2002 and November 20, 2002 occur in the next lunar year eclipse set.

Lunar eclipse series sets from 1998 to 2002
Descending node				Ascending node			
Saros	Date Viewing	Type Chart	Gamma	Saros	Date Viewing	Type Chart	Gamma
109	1998 Aug 08	Penumbral	1.4876	114	1999 Jan 31	Penumbral	−1.0190
119	1999 Jul 28	Partial	0.7863	124	2000 Jan 21	Total	−0.2957
129	2000 Jul 16	Total	0.0302	134	2001 Jan 09	Total	0.3720
139	2001 Jul 05	Partial	−0.7287	144	2001 Dec 30	Penumbral	1.0732
149	2002 Jun 24	Penumbral	−1.4440				

=== Saros 139 ===
This eclipse is a part of Saros series 139, repeating every 18 years, 11 days, and containing 79 events. The series started with a penumbral lunar eclipse on December 9, 1658. It contains partial eclipses from June 3, 1947 through August 7, 2055; total eclipses from August 17, 2073 through May 30, 2542; and a second set of partial eclipses from June 9, 2560 through August 25, 2686. The series ends at member 75 as a penumbral eclipse on April 13, 3065.

The longest duration of totality will be produced by member 31 at 102 minutes, 39 seconds on November 2, 2199. All eclipses in this series occur at the Moon’s descending node of orbit.

Greatest	First			
The greatest eclipse of the series will occur on 2199 Nov 02, lasting 102 minutes, 39 seconds.	Penumbral	Partial	Total	Central
The greatest eclipse of the series will occur on 2199 Nov 02, lasting 102 minutes, 39 seconds.	1658 Dec 09	1947 Jun 03	2073 Aug 17	2109 Sep 09
The greatest eclipse of the series will occur on 2199 Nov 02, lasting 102 minutes, 39 seconds.	Last			
The greatest eclipse of the series will occur on 2199 Nov 02, lasting 102 minutes, 39 seconds.	Central	Total	Partial	Penumbral
The greatest eclipse of the series will occur on 2199 Nov 02, lasting 102 minutes, 39 seconds.	2488 Apr 26	2542 May 30	2686 Aug 25	3065 Apr 13

Eclipses are tabulated in three columns; every third eclipse in the same column is one exeligmos apart, so they all cast shadows over approximately the same parts of the Earth.

Series members 9–31 occur between 1801 and 2200:
9	10	11
1803 Mar 08	1821 Mar 18	1839 Mar 30
12	13	14
1857 Apr 09	1875 Apr 20	1893 Apr 30
15	16	17
1911 May 13	1929 May 23	1947 Jun 03
18	19	20
1965 Jun 14	1983 Jun 25	2001 Jul 05
21	22	23
2019 Jul 16	2037 Jul 27	2055 Aug 07
24	25	26
2073 Aug 17	2091 Aug 29	2109 Sep 09
27	28	29
2127 Sep 20	2145 Sep 30	2163 Oct 12
30	31	
2181 Oct 22	2199 Nov 02	

=== Tritos series ===
This eclipse is a part of a tritos cycle, repeating at alternating nodes every 135 synodic months (≈ 3986.63 days, or 11 years minus 1 month). Their appearance and longitude are irregular due to a lack of synchronization with the anomalistic month (period of perigee), but groupings of 3 tritos cycles (≈ 33 years minus 3 months) come close (≈ 434.044 anomalistic months), so eclipses are similar in these groupings.

Series members between 1801 and 2187
1805 Jan 15 (Saros 121)	1815 Dec 16 (Saros 122)	1826 Nov 14 (Saros 123)	1837 Oct 13 (Saros 124)	1848 Sep 13 (Saros 125)
1859 Aug 13 (Saros 126)	1870 Jul 12 (Saros 127)	1881 Jun 12 (Saros 128)	1892 May 11 (Saros 129)	1903 Apr 12 (Saros 130)
1914 Mar 12 (Saros 131)	1925 Feb 08 (Saros 132)	1936 Jan 08 (Saros 133)	1946 Dec 08 (Saros 134)	1957 Nov 07 (Saros 135)
1968 Oct 06 (Saros 136)	1979 Sep 06 (Saros 137)	1990 Aug 06 (Saros 138)	2001 Jul 05 (Saros 139)	2012 Jun 04 (Saros 140)
2023 May 05 (Saros 141)	2034 Apr 03 (Saros 142)	2045 Mar 03 (Saros 143)	2056 Feb 01 (Saros 144)	2066 Dec 31 (Saros 145)
2077 Nov 29 (Saros 146)	2088 Oct 30 (Saros 147)	2099 Sep 29 (Saros 148)	2110 Aug 29 (Saros 149)	2121 Jul 30 (Saros 150)
2132 Jun 28 (Saros 151)	2143 May 28 (Saros 152)	2154 Apr 28 (Saros 153)		
2187 Jan 24 (Saros 156)

=== Inex series ===
This eclipse is a part of the long period inex cycle, repeating at alternating nodes, every 358 synodic months (≈ 10,571.95 days, or 29 years minus 20 days). Their appearance and longitude are irregular due to a lack of synchronization with the anomalistic month (period of perigee). However, groupings of 3 inex cycles (≈ 87 years minus 2 months) comes close (≈ 1,151.02 anomalistic months), so eclipses are similar in these groupings.

Series members between 1801 and 2200
1827 Nov 03 (Saros 133)	1856 Oct 13 (Saros 134)	1885 Sep 24 (Saros 135)
1914 Sep 04 (Saros 136)	1943 Aug 15 (Saros 137)	1972 Jul 26 (Saros 138)
2001 Jul 05 (Saros 139)	2030 Jun 15 (Saros 140)	2059 May 27 (Saros 141)
2088 May 05 (Saros 142)	2117 Apr 16 (Saros 143)	2146 Mar 28 (Saros 144)
2175 Mar 07 (Saros 145)

=== Half-Saros cycle ===
A lunar eclipse will be preceded and followed by solar eclipses by 9 years and 5.5 days (a half saros). This lunar eclipse is related to two total solar eclipses of Solar Saros 146.

June 30, 1992	July 11, 2010

== See also ==
- List of lunar eclipses
- List of 21st-century lunar eclipses
