= June 1983 lunar eclipse =

Partial lunar eclipse June 25, 1983

- Partial eclipse
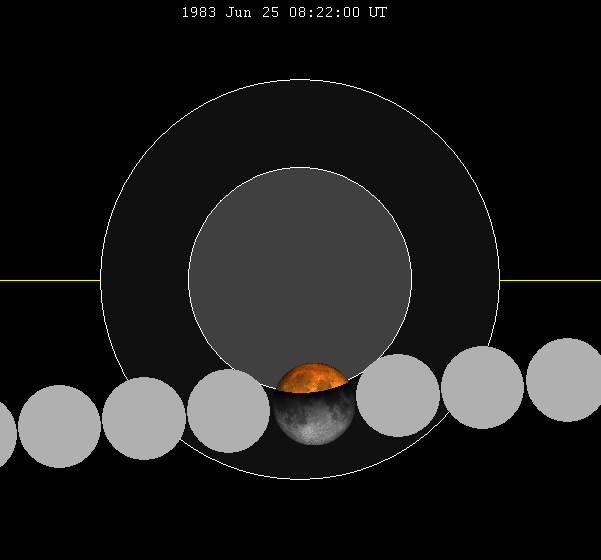
- The Moon's hourly motion shown right to left
- Date: June 25, 1983
- Gamma: −0.8152
- Magnitude: 0.3348
- Saros cycle: 139 (20 of 81)
- Partiality: 134 minutes, 35 seconds
- Penumbral: 314 minutes, 43 seconds
Contacts (UTC)
- P1: 5:44:56
- U1: 7:14:57
- Greatest: 8:22:18
- U4: 9:29:32
- P4: 10:59:39

A partial lunar eclipse occurred at the Moon’s descending node of orbit on Saturday, June 25, 1983, with an umbral magnitude of 0.3348. A lunar eclipse occurs when the Moon moves into the Earth's shadow, causing the Moon to be darkened. A partial lunar eclipse occurs when one part of the Moon is in the Earth's umbra, while the other part is in the Earth's penumbra. Unlike a solar eclipse, which can only be viewed from a relatively small area of the world, a lunar eclipse may be viewed from anywhere on the night side of Earth. Occurring about 3.7 days before apogee (on June 28, 1983, at 23:40 UTC), the Moon's apparent diameter was smaller.

== Visibility ==
The eclipse was completely visible over western and central North America, western South America, and Antarctica, seen rising over Australia and the western Pacific Ocean and setting over eastern North and South America and west Africa.

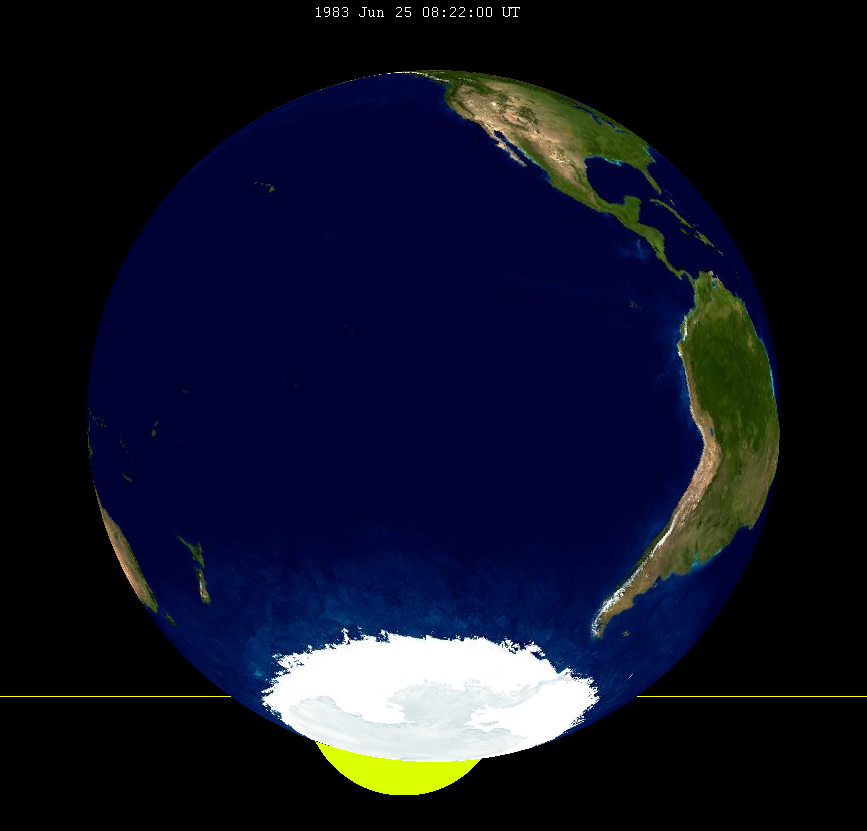
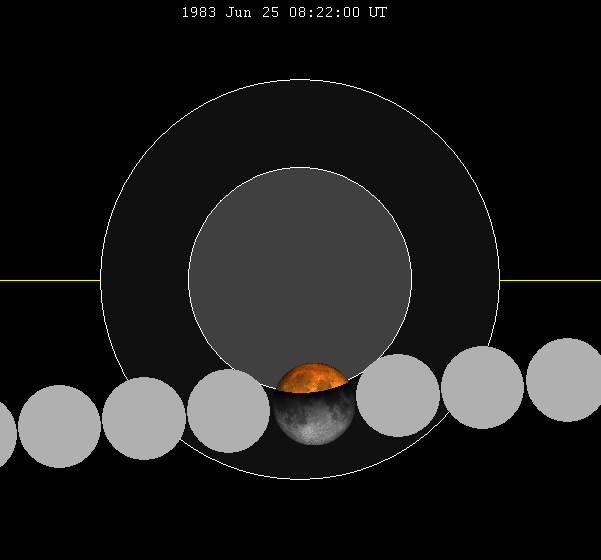

== Eclipse details ==
Shown below is a table displaying details about this particular lunar eclipse. It describes various parameters pertaining to this eclipse.

June 25, 1983 Lunar Eclipse Parameters
Parameter	Value
Penumbral Magnitude	1.39014
Umbral Magnitude	0.33479
Gamma	−0.81520
Sun Right Ascension	06h14m04.1s
Sun Declination	+23°24'07.7"
Sun Semi-Diameter	15'44.1"
Sun Equatorial Horizontal Parallax	08.7"
Moon Right Ascension	18h13m49.6s
Moon Declination	-24°08'36.4"
Moon Semi-Diameter	14'54.6"
Moon Equatorial Horizontal Parallax	0°54'43.1"
ΔT	53.4 s

== Eclipse season ==
This eclipse is part of an eclipse season, a period, roughly every six months, when eclipses occur. Only two (or occasionally three) eclipse seasons occur each year, and each season lasts about 35 days and repeats just short of six months (173 days) later; thus two full eclipse seasons always occur each year. Either two or three eclipses happen each eclipse season. In the sequence below, each eclipse is separated by a fortnight.

Eclipse season of June 1983
June 11 Ascending node (new moon)	June 25 Descending node (full moon)
Total solar eclipse Solar Saros 127	Partial lunar eclipse Lunar Saros 139

== Related eclipses ==
=== Eclipses in 1983 ===
- A total solar eclipse on June 11.
- A partial lunar eclipse on June 25.
- An annular solar eclipse on December 4.
- A penumbral lunar eclipse on December 20.

=== Metonic ===
- Preceded by: Lunar eclipse of September 6, 1979
- Followed by: Lunar eclipse of April 14, 1987

=== Tzolkinex ===
- Preceded by: Lunar eclipse of May 13, 1976
- Followed by: Lunar eclipse of August 6, 1990

=== Half-Saros ===
- Preceded by: Solar eclipse of June 20, 1974
- Followed by: Solar eclipse of June 30, 1992

=== Tritos ===
- Preceded by: Lunar eclipse of July 26, 1972
- Followed by: Lunar eclipse of May 25, 1994

=== Lunar Saros 139 ===
- Preceded by: Lunar eclipse of June 14, 1965
- Followed by: Lunar eclipse of July 5, 2001

=== Inex ===
- Preceded by: Lunar eclipse of July 16, 1954
- Followed by: Lunar eclipse of June 4, 2012

=== Triad ===
- Preceded by: Lunar eclipse of August 23, 1896
- Followed by: Lunar eclipse of April 25, 2070

=== Lunar eclipses of 1980–1984 ===
This eclipse is a member of a semester series. An eclipse in a semester series of lunar eclipses repeats approximately every 177 days and 4 hours (a semester) at alternating nodes of the Moon's orbit.

The penumbral lunar eclipses on March 1, 1980 and August 26, 1980 occur in the previous lunar year eclipse set, and the penumbral lunar eclipses on May 15, 1984 and November 8, 1984 occur in the next lunar year eclipse set.

Lunar eclipse series sets from 1980 to 1984
Descending node				Ascending node			
Saros	Date Viewing	Type Chart	Gamma	Saros	Date Viewing	Type Chart	Gamma
109	1980 Jul 27	Penumbral	1.4139	114	1981 Jan 20	Penumbral	−1.0142
119	1981 Jul 17	Partial	0.7045	124	1982 Jan 09	Total	−0.2916
129	1982 Jul 06	Total	−0.0579	134	1982 Dec 30	Total	0.3758
139	1983 Jun 25	Partial	−0.8152	144	1983 Dec 20	Penumbral	1.0747
149	1984 Jun 13	Penumbral	−1.5240				

=== Saros 139 ===
This eclipse is a part of Saros series 139, repeating every 18 years, 11 days, and containing 79 events. The series started with a penumbral lunar eclipse on December 9, 1658. It contains partial eclipses from June 3, 1947 through August 7, 2055; total eclipses from August 17, 2073 through May 30, 2542; and a second set of partial eclipses from June 9, 2560 through August 25, 2686. The series ends at member 75 as a penumbral eclipse on April 13, 3065.

The longest duration of totality will be produced by member 31 at 102 minutes, 39 seconds on November 2, 2199. All eclipses in this series occur at the Moon’s descending node of orbit.

Greatest	First			
The greatest eclipse of the series will occur on 2199 Nov 02, lasting 102 minutes, 39 seconds.	Penumbral	Partial	Total	Central
The greatest eclipse of the series will occur on 2199 Nov 02, lasting 102 minutes, 39 seconds.	1658 Dec 09	1947 Jun 03	2073 Aug 17	2109 Sep 09
The greatest eclipse of the series will occur on 2199 Nov 02, lasting 102 minutes, 39 seconds.	Last			
The greatest eclipse of the series will occur on 2199 Nov 02, lasting 102 minutes, 39 seconds.	Central	Total	Partial	Penumbral
The greatest eclipse of the series will occur on 2199 Nov 02, lasting 102 minutes, 39 seconds.	2488 Apr 26	2542 May 30	2686 Aug 25	3065 Apr 13

Eclipses are tabulated in three columns; every third eclipse in the same column is one exeligmos apart, so they all cast shadows over approximately the same parts of the Earth.

Series members 9–31 occur between 1801 and 2200:
9	10	11
1803 Mar 08	1821 Mar 18	1839 Mar 30
12	13	14
1857 Apr 09	1875 Apr 20	1893 Apr 30
15	16	17
1911 May 13	1929 May 23	1947 Jun 03
18	19	20
1965 Jun 14	1983 Jun 25	2001 Jul 05
21	22	23
2019 Jul 16	2037 Jul 27	2055 Aug 07
24	25	26
2073 Aug 17	2091 Aug 29	2109 Sep 09
27	28	29
2127 Sep 20	2145 Sep 30	2163 Oct 12
30	31	
2181 Oct 22	2199 Nov 02	

=== Tritos series ===
This eclipse is a part of a tritos cycle, repeating at alternating nodes every 135 synodic months (≈ 3986.63 days, or 11 years minus 1 month). Their appearance and longitude are irregular due to a lack of synchronization with the anomalistic month (period of perigee), but groupings of 3 tritos cycles (≈ 33 years minus 3 months) come close (≈ 434.044 anomalistic months), so eclipses are similar in these groupings.

Series members between 1801 and 2200
1808 Nov 03 (Saros 123)	1819 Oct 03 (Saros 124)	1830 Sep 02 (Saros 125)	1841 Aug 02 (Saros 126)	1852 Jul 01 (Saros 127)
1863 Jun 01 (Saros 128)	1874 May 01 (Saros 129)	1885 Mar 30 (Saros 130)	1896 Feb 28 (Saros 131)	1907 Jan 29 (Saros 132)
1917 Dec 28 (Saros 133)	1928 Nov 27 (Saros 134)	1939 Oct 28 (Saros 135)	1950 Sep 26 (Saros 136)	1961 Aug 26 (Saros 137)
1972 Jul 26 (Saros 138)	1983 Jun 25 (Saros 139)	1994 May 25 (Saros 140)	2005 Apr 24 (Saros 141)	2016 Mar 23 (Saros 142)
2027 Feb 20 (Saros 143)	2038 Jan 21 (Saros 144)	2048 Dec 20 (Saros 145)	2059 Nov 19 (Saros 146)	2070 Oct 19 (Saros 147)
2081 Sep 18 (Saros 148)	2092 Aug 17 (Saros 149)	2103 Jul 19 (Saros 150)	2114 Jun 18 (Saros 151)	2125 May 17 (Saros 152)
2136 Apr 16 (Saros 153)			2169 Jan 13 (Saros 156)	
2190 Nov 12 (Saros 158)

=== Inex series ===
This eclipse is a part of the long period inex cycle, repeating at alternating nodes, every 358 synodic months (≈ 10,571.95 days, or 29 years minus 20 days). Their appearance and longitude are irregular due to a lack of synchronization with the anomalistic month (period of perigee). However, groupings of 3 inex cycles (≈ 87 years minus 2 months) comes close (≈ 1,151.02 anomalistic months), so eclipses are similar in these groupings.

Series members between 1801 and 2200
1809 Oct 23 (Saros 133)	1838 Oct 03 (Saros 134)	1867 Sep 14 (Saros 135)
1896 Aug 23 (Saros 136)	1925 Aug 04 (Saros 137)	1954 Jul 16 (Saros 138)
1983 Jun 25 (Saros 139)	2012 Jun 04 (Saros 140)	2041 May 16 (Saros 141)
2070 Apr 25 (Saros 142)	2099 Apr 05 (Saros 143)	2128 Mar 16 (Saros 144)
2157 Feb 24 (Saros 145)	2186 Feb 04 (Saros 146)	

=== Half-Saros cycle ===
A lunar eclipse will be preceded and followed by solar eclipses by 9 years and 5.5 days (a half saros). This lunar eclipse is related to two total solar eclipses of Solar Saros 146.

June 20, 1974	June 30, 1992

== See also ==
- List of lunar eclipses
- List of 20th-century lunar eclipses
