= Solar eclipse of June 8, 1956 =

Total eclipse

- Total eclipse
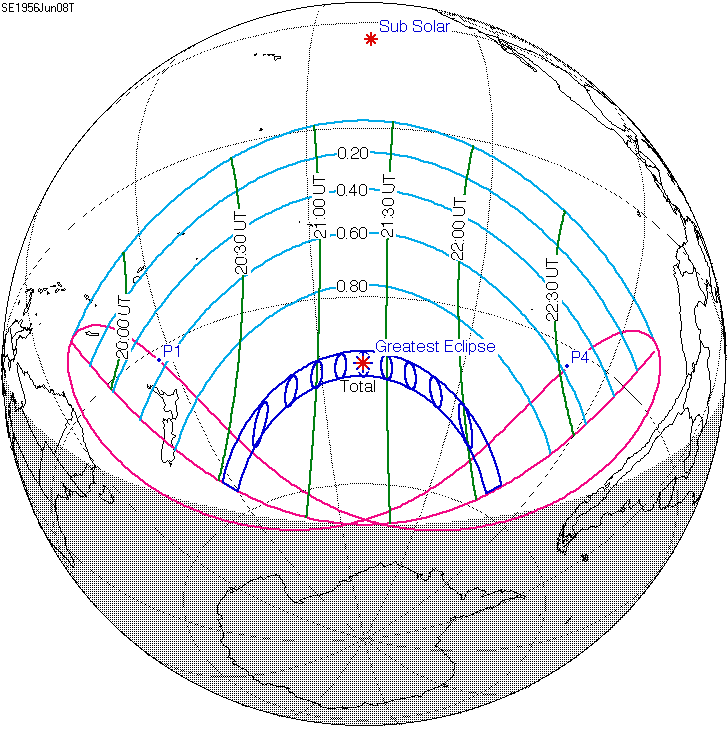
- Map
- Gamma: −0.8934
- Magnitude: 1.0581

Maximum eclipse
- Duration: 285 s (4 min 45 s)
- Coordinates: 40.8°S 140.7°W
- Max. width of band: 429 km (267 mi)

Times (UTC)
- Greatest eclipse: 21:20:39

References
- Saros: 146 (24 of 76)
- Catalog # (SE5000): 9412

A total solar eclipse occurred at the Moon's descending node of orbit between Friday, June 8 and Saturday, June 9, 1956, with a magnitude of 1.0581. A solar eclipse occurs when the Moon passes between Earth and the Sun, thereby totally or partly obscuring the image of the Sun for a viewer on Earth. A total solar eclipse occurs when the Moon's apparent diameter is larger than the Sun's, blocking all direct sunlight, turning day into darkness. Totality occurs in a narrow path across Earth's surface, with the partial solar eclipse visible over a surrounding region thousands of kilometres wide. Occurring about 1.3 days before perigee (on June 10, 1956, at 4:10 UTC), the Moon's apparent diameter was larger.

It began near sunrise over New Zealand on June 9 (Saturday), and ended west of South America on June 8 (Friday). A partial eclipse was visible for most of Oceania.

== Eclipse details ==
Shown below are two tables displaying details about this particular solar eclipse. The first table outlines times at which the Moon's penumbra or umbra attains the specific parameter, and the second table describes various other parameters pertaining to this eclipse.

June 8, 1956 Solar Eclipse Times
Event	Time (UTC)
First Penumbral External Contact	1956 June 8 at 19:11:21.5 UTC
First Umbral External Contact	1956 June 8 at 20:31:34.6 UTC
First Central Line	1956 June 8 at 20:34:31.6 UTC
First Umbral Internal Contact	1956 June 8 at 20:37:38.2 UTC
Greatest Eclipse	1956 June 8 at 21:20:39.3 UTC
Greatest Duration	1956 June 8 at 21:20:59.3 UTC
Equatorial Conjunction	1956 June 8 at 21:21:17.5 UTC
Ecliptic Conjunction	1956 June 8 at 21:29:39.0 UTC
Last Umbral Internal Contact	1956 June 8 at 22:03:38.5 UTC
Last Central Line	1956 June 8 at 22:06:46.5 UTC
Last Umbral External Contact	1956 June 8 at 22:09:44.9 UTC
Last Penumbral External Contact	1956 June 8 at 23:29:54.1 UTC

June 8, 1956 Solar Eclipse Parameters
Parameter	Value
Eclipse Magnitude	1.05810
Eclipse Obscuration	1.11958
Gamma	−0.89341
Sun Right Ascension	05h07m54.5s
Sun Declination	+22°54'13.6"
Sun Semi-Diameter	15'45.2"
Sun Equatorial Horizontal Parallax	08.7"
Moon Right Ascension	05h07m52.9s
Moon Declination	+22°00'05.8"
Moon Semi-Diameter	16'32.9"
Moon Equatorial Horizontal Parallax	1°00'44.0"
ΔT	31.5 s

== Eclipse season ==
This eclipse is part of an eclipse season, a period, roughly every six months, when eclipses occur. Only two (or occasionally three) eclipse seasons occur each year, and each season lasts about 35 days and repeats just short of six months (173 days) later; thus two full eclipse seasons always occur each year. Either two or three eclipses happen each eclipse season. In the sequence below, each eclipse is separated by a fortnight.

Eclipse season of May–June 1956
May 24 Ascending node (full moon)	June 8 Descending node (new moon)
Partial lunar eclipse Lunar Saros 120	Total solar eclipse Solar Saros 146

== Related eclipses ==
=== Eclipses in 1956 ===
- A partial lunar eclipse on May 24.
- A total solar eclipse on June 8.
- A total lunar eclipse on November 18.
- A partial solar eclipse on December 2.

=== Metonic ===
- Preceded by: Solar eclipse of August 20, 1952
- Followed by: Solar eclipse of March 27, 1960

=== Tzolkinex ===
- Preceded by: Solar eclipse of April 28, 1949
- Followed by: Solar eclipse of July 20, 1963

=== Half-Saros ===
- Preceded by: Lunar eclipse of June 3, 1947
- Followed by: Lunar eclipse of June 14, 1965

=== Tritos ===
- Preceded by: Solar eclipse of July 9, 1945
- Followed by: Solar eclipse of May 9, 1967

=== Solar Saros 146 ===
- Preceded by: Solar eclipse of May 29, 1938
- Followed by: Solar eclipse of June 20, 1974

=== Inex ===
- Preceded by: Solar eclipse of June 29, 1927
- Followed by: Solar eclipse of May 19, 1985

=== Triad ===
- Preceded by: Solar eclipse of August 7, 1869
- Followed by: Solar eclipse of April 9, 2043

=== Solar eclipses of 1953–1956 ===
This eclipse is a member of a semester series. An eclipse in a semester series of solar eclipses repeats approximately every 177 days and 4 hours (a semester) at alternating nodes of the Moon's orbit.

The partial solar eclipses on February 14, 1953 and August 9, 1953 occur in the previous lunar year eclipse set.

Solar eclipse series sets from 1953 to 1956
Descending node			Ascending node		
Saros	Map	Gamma	Saros	Map	Gamma
116	July 11, 1953 Partial	1.4388	121	January 5, 1954 Annular	−0.9296
126	June 30, 1954 Total	0.6135	131	December 25, 1954 Annular	−0.2576
136	June 20, 1955 Total	−0.1528	141	December 14, 1955 Annular	0.4266
146	June 8, 1956 Total	−0.8934	151	December 2, 1956 Partial	1.0923

=== Saros 146 ===
This eclipse is a part of Saros series 146, repeating every 18 years, 11 days, and containing 76 events. The series started with a partial solar eclipse on September 19, 1541. It contains total eclipses from May 29, 1938 through October 7, 2154; hybrid eclipses from October 17, 2172 through November 20, 2226; and annular eclipses from November 30, 2244 through August 10, 2659. The series ends at member 76 as a partial eclipse on December 29, 2893. Its eclipses are tabulated in three columns; every third eclipse in the same column is one exeligmos apart, so they all cast shadows over approximately the same parts of the Earth.

The longest duration of totality was produced by member 26 at 5 minutes, 21 seconds on June 30, 1992, and the longest duration of annularity will be produced by member 63 at 3 minutes, 30 seconds on August 10, 2659. All eclipses in this series occur at the Moon’s descending node of orbit.

Series members 16–37 occur between 1801 and 2200:
16	17	18
March 13, 1812	March 24, 1830	April 3, 1848
19	20	21
April 15, 1866	April 25, 1884	May 7, 1902
22	23	24
May 18, 1920	May 29, 1938	June 8, 1956
25	26	27
June 20, 1974	June 30, 1992	July 11, 2010
28	29	30
July 22, 2028	August 2, 2046	August 12, 2064
31	32	33
August 24, 2082	September 4, 2100	September 15, 2118
34	35	36
September 26, 2136	October 7, 2154	October 17, 2172
37
October 29, 2190

=== Metonic series ===
The metonic series repeats eclipses every 19 years (6939.69 days), lasting about 5 cycles. Eclipses occur in nearly the same calendar date. In addition, the octon subseries repeats 1/5 of that or every 3.8 years (1387.94 days). All eclipses in this table occur at the Moon's descending node.

22 eclipse events between March 27, 1884 and August 20, 1971
March 27–29	January 14	November 1–2	August 20–21	June 8
108	110	112	114	116
March 27, 1884			August 20, 1895	June 8, 1899
118	120	122	124	126
March 29, 1903	January 14, 1907	November 2, 1910	August 21, 1914	June 8, 1918
128	130	132	134	136
March 28, 1922	January 14, 1926	November 1, 1929	August 21, 1933	June 8, 1937
138	140	142	144	146
March 27, 1941	January 14, 1945	November 1, 1948	August 20, 1952	June 8, 1956
148	150	152	154	
March 27, 1960	January 14, 1964	November 2, 1967	August 20, 1971	

=== Tritos series ===
This eclipse is a part of a tritos cycle, repeating at alternating nodes every 135 synodic months (≈ 3986.63 days, or 11 years minus 1 month). Their appearance and longitude are irregular due to a lack of synchronization with the anomalistic month (period of perigee), but groupings of 3 tritos cycles (≈ 33 years minus 3 months) come close (≈ 434.044 anomalistic months), so eclipses are similar in these groupings.

Series members between 1801 and 2087
August 17, 1803 (Saros 132)	July 17, 1814 (Saros 133)	June 16, 1825 (Saros 134)	May 15, 1836 (Saros 135)	April 15, 1847 (Saros 136)
March 15, 1858 (Saros 137)	February 11, 1869 (Saros 138)	January 11, 1880 (Saros 139)	December 12, 1890 (Saros 140)	November 11, 1901 (Saros 141)
October 10, 1912 (Saros 142)	September 10, 1923 (Saros 143)	August 10, 1934 (Saros 144)	July 9, 1945 (Saros 145)	June 8, 1956 (Saros 146)
May 9, 1967 (Saros 147)	April 7, 1978 (Saros 148)	March 7, 1989 (Saros 149)	February 5, 2000 (Saros 150)	January 4, 2011 (Saros 151)
December 4, 2021 (Saros 152)	November 3, 2032 (Saros 153)	October 3, 2043 (Saros 154)	September 2, 2054 (Saros 155)	August 2, 2065 (Saros 156)
July 1, 2076 (Saros 157)	June 1, 2087 (Saros 158)			

=== Inex series ===
This eclipse is a part of the long period inex cycle, repeating at alternating nodes, every 358 synodic months (≈ 10,571.95 days, or 29 years minus 20 days). Their appearance and longitude are irregular due to a lack of synchronization with the anomalistic month (period of perigee). However, groupings of 3 inex cycles (≈ 87 years minus 2 months) comes close (≈ 1,151.02 anomalistic months), so eclipses are similar in these groupings.

Series members between 1801 and 2200
September 17, 1811 (Saros 141)	August 27, 1840 (Saros 142)	August 7, 1869 (Saros 143)
July 18, 1898 (Saros 144)	June 29, 1927 (Saros 145)	June 8, 1956 (Saros 146)
May 19, 1985 (Saros 147)	April 29, 2014 (Saros 148)	April 9, 2043 (Saros 149)
March 19, 2072 (Saros 150)	February 28, 2101 (Saros 151)	February 8, 2130 (Saros 152)
January 19, 2159 (Saros 153)	December 29, 2187 (Saros 154)	
