= Solar eclipse of June 30, 1992 =

Total eclipse

- Total eclipse
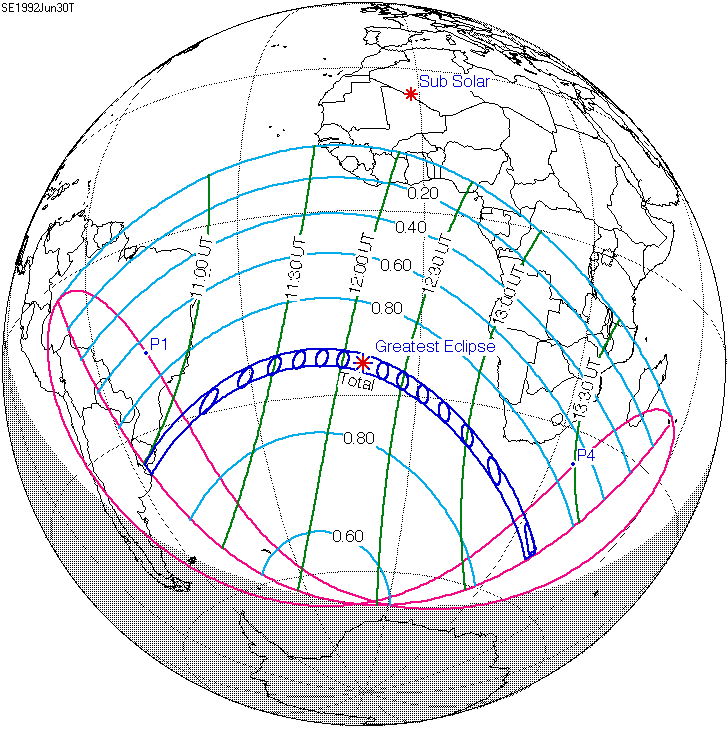
- Map
- Gamma: −0.7512
- Magnitude: 1.0592

Maximum eclipse
- Duration: 321 s (5 min 21 s)
- Coordinates: 25.2°S 9.5°W
- Max. width of band: 294 km (183 mi)

Times (UTC)
- Greatest eclipse: 12:11:22

References
- Saros: 146 (26 of 76)
- Catalog # (SE5000): 9491

External image
- https://www.facebook.com/photo/?fbid=1904991232933998&set=gm.2435226406499618

A total solar eclipse occurred at the Moon's descending node of orbit on Tuesday, June 30, 1992, with a magnitude of 1.0592. A solar eclipse occurs when the Moon passes between Earth and the Sun, thereby totally or partly obscuring the image of the Sun for a viewer on Earth. A total solar eclipse occurs when the Moon's apparent diameter is larger than the Sun's, blocking all direct sunlight, turning day into darkness. Totality occurs in a narrow path across Earth's surface, with the partial solar eclipse visible over a surrounding region thousands of kilometres wide. Occurring about 1.5 days before perigee (on July 2, 1992, at 1:30 UTC), the Moon's apparent diameter was larger.

Totality was visible in southeastern Uruguay and southern tip of Rio Grande do Sul, Brazil. A partial eclipse was visible for parts of central South America, West Africa, Central Africa, and Southern Africa.

== Observations ==
Animation path

The path of totality was mostly on the sea and covered very little land. From the only land covered by it in southeastern Uruguay and southern tip of Brazil, totality occurred shortly after sunrise, with the solar zenith angle less than 3°. Observation from an airplane over the middle of South Atlantic Ocean, near the location of maximum eclipse, could offer a duration of totality of up to 10 minutes with the guarantee of clear weather. However, due to the limitations in the cruising capabilities and the economic cost, a feasible flight plan was to see 5 to 6 minutes of totality on the airplane. 48 people from the United States, Canada, Brazil, Germany, Japan and Great Britain boarded a VASP airline DC-10 plane, departing from Rio de Janeiro, Brazil, flying over the South Atlantic Ocean and returning to Rio de Janeiro. The passengers got off and the captain flew the airplane back to São Paulo. Although adjustment in the flying speed had to be made according to the take-off time and wind speed, the pilot flew the airplane into Moon's umbra within 1 second of the predicted time, and the passengers on board successfully saw the total eclipse. Accidentally, one of the ground support personnel did not exit the airplane before takeoff, and she also saw the eclipse. The pilots were also attracted by the eclipse, still watching the Moon's shadow moving into the distance and forgetting to fly the airplane back return even minutes after the third contact (the end of the total phase). The captain described this as the most unusual flight he ever commanded. VASP airline also provided a Boeing 737 plane to the Rio de Janeiro Planetarium. Planetarium staff, of their astronomy club, local dignitaries, politicians and celebrities were also invited.

== Eclipse timing ==
=== Places experiencing total eclipse ===
Solar Eclipse of June 30, 1992 (Local Times)
Country or territory	City or place	Start of partial eclipse	Start of total eclipse	Maximum eclipse	End of total eclipse	End of partial eclipse	Duration of totality (min:s)	Duration of eclipse (hr:min)	Maximum magnitude
Uruguay	Minas	07:48:04 (sunrise)	07:59:56	08:00:51	08:01:46	09:09:09	1:50	1:21	1.0053
Uruguay	Montevideo	07:53:15 (sunrise)	07:59:52	08:00:55	08:01:59	09:08:40	2:07	1:15	1.0075
Uruguay	Rocha	07:44:44 (sunrise)	08:00:05	08:01:30	08:02:57	09:10:22	2:52	1:26	1.0168
Uruguay	Maldonado	07:48:18 (sunrise)	08:00:10	08:01:37	08:03:06	09:10:06	2:56	1:22	1.0199
Uruguay	Punta del Este	07:48:17 (sunrise)	08:00:12	08:01:41	08:03:10	09:10:10	2:58	1:22	1.0209

=== Places experiencing partial eclipse ===
Solar Eclipse of June 30, 1992 (Local Times)
Country or territory	City or place	Start of partial eclipse	Maximum eclipse	End of partial eclipse	Duration of eclipse (hr:min)	Maximum coverage
Paraguay	Asunción	06:36:45 (sunrise)	06:50:34	07:54:53	1:18	70.39%
Uruguay	Rivera	07:40:46 (sunrise)	07:56:51	09:04:39	1:24	91.22%
Bolivia	Sucre	06:54:47 (sunrise)	06:57:14	07:36:39	0:42	33.74%
Uruguay	Tacuarembó	07:44:29 (sunrise)	07:57:28	09:05:06	1:21	93.07%
Uruguay	Durazno	07:50:42 (sunrise)	07:59:00	09:06:28	1:16	97.10%
Brazil	Rio de Janeiro	06:53:12	07:59:31	09:15:23	2:22	83.05%
Uruguay	Canelones	07:52:37 (sunrise)	08:00:26	09:08:07	1:16	99.93%
Bolivia	La Paz	07:01:31 (sunrise)	07:03:55	07:29:01	0:28	17.33%
Argentina	Buenos Aires	08:01:15 (sunrise)	08:04:09	09:05:55	1:05	92.94%
South Georgia and the South Sandwich Islands	King Edward Point	08:48:00 (sunrise)	09:45:36	10:52:07	2:04	52.30%
Chile	Santiago	07:47:21 (sunrise)	07:48:24	07:54:05	0:07	3.25%
Falkland Islands	Stanley	07:59:16 (sunrise)	08:03:36	08:27:07	0:28	22.57%
Saint Helena, Ascension and Tristan da Cunha	Jamestown	10:42:52	12:14:38	13:45:05	3:02	74.77%
Antarctica	Orcadas Base	09:10:24 (sunrise)	09:17:22	09:48:47	0:38	28.39%
São Tomé and Príncipe	São Tomé	11:38:07	12:33:06	13:25:17	1:47	10.32%
Bouvet Island	Bouvet Island	13:31:19	14:42:08	15:50:33	2:19	60.13%
French Southern and Antarctic Lands	Île de la Possession	17:29:12	17:52:08	17:55:48 (sunset)	0:27	24.06%
Angola	Luanda	12:47:27	13:55:24	14:57:15	2:10	24.06%
Republic of the Congo	Brazzaville	13:04:23	13:55:35	14:43:06	1:39	9.74%
Democratic Republic of the Congo	Kinshasa	13:04:22	13:55:41	14:43:19	1:39	9.83%
Angola	Lubango	12:42:52	14:00:08	15:09:30	2:27	41.06%
Namibia	Windhoek	13:50:42	15:09:52	16:20:21	2:30	57.39%
South Africa	Cape Town	13:52:01	15:12:05	16:24:00	2:32	88.66%
Botswana	Gaborone	14:13:03	15:22:45	16:25:02	2:12	46.78%
Zambia	Lusaka	14:31:03	15:23:28	16:11:17	1:40	16.53%
Lesotho	Maseru	14:13:13	15:24:19	16:27:57	2:15	58.16%
South Africa	Johannesburg	14:16:53	15:25:13	16:26:25	2:10	47.55%
Zimbabwe	Harare	14:35:00	15:27:25	16:15:13	1:40	18.36%
Eswatini	Mbabane	14:23:44	15:28:24	16:26:33	2:03	42.33%
Mozambique	Maputo	14:27:13	15:29:45	16:26:07	1:59	38.75%

== Eclipse details ==
Shown below are two tables displaying details about this particular solar eclipse. The first table outlines times at which the Moon's penumbra or umbra attains the specific parameter, and the second table describes various other parameters pertaining to this eclipse.

June 30, 1992 Solar Eclipse Times
Event	Time (UTC)
First Penumbral External Contact	1992 June 30 at 09:51:53.8 UTC
First Umbral External Contact	1992 June 30 at 11:00:47.0 UTC
First Central Line	1992 June 30 at 11:02:41.9 UTC
First Umbral Internal Contact	1992 June 30 at 11:04:38.8 UTC
Greatest Duration	1992 June 30 at 12:10:22.2 UTC
Greatest Eclipse	1992 June 30 at 12:11:21.8 UTC
Ecliptic Conjunction	1992 June 30 at 12:18:59.8 UTC
Equatorial Conjunction	1992 June 30 at 12:24:21.9 UTC
Last Umbral Internal Contact	1992 June 30 at 13:17:54.3 UTC
Last Central Line	1992 June 30 at 13:19:52.9 UTC
Last Umbral External Contact	1992 June 30 at 13:21:49.6 UTC
Last Penumbral External Contact	1992 June 30 at 14:30:41.0 UTC

June 30, 1992 Solar Eclipse Parameters
Parameter	Value
Eclipse Magnitude	1.05916
Eclipse Obscuration	1.12183
Gamma	−0.75120
Sun Right Ascension	06h38m55.2s
Sun Declination	+23°08'19.2"
Sun Semi-Diameter	15'43.9"
Sun Equatorial Horizontal Parallax	08.6"
Moon Right Ascension	06h38m23.1s
Moon Declination	+22°23'36.1"
Moon Semi-Diameter	16'28.8"
Moon Equatorial Horizontal Parallax	1°00'29.0"
ΔT	58.7 s

== Eclipse season ==
This eclipse is part of an eclipse season, a period, roughly every six months, when eclipses occur. Only two (or occasionally three) eclipse seasons occur each year, and each season lasts about 35 days and repeats just short of six months (173 days) later; thus two full eclipse seasons always occur each year. Either two or three eclipses happen each eclipse season. In the sequence below, each eclipse is separated by a fortnight.

Eclipse season of June 1992
June 15 Ascending node (full moon)	June 30 Descending node (new moon)
Partial lunar eclipse Lunar Saros 120	Total solar eclipse Solar Saros 146

== Related eclipses ==
=== Eclipses in 1992 ===
- An annular solar eclipse on January 4.
- A partial lunar eclipse on June 15.
- A total solar eclipse on June 30.
- A total lunar eclipse on December 9.
- A partial solar eclipse on December 24.

=== Metonic ===
- Preceded by: Solar eclipse of September 11, 1988
- Followed by: Solar eclipse of April 17, 1996

=== Tzolkinex ===
- Preceded by: Solar eclipse of May 19, 1985
- Followed by: Solar eclipse of August 11, 1999

=== Half-Saros ===
- Preceded by: Lunar eclipse of June 25, 1983
- Followed by: Lunar eclipse of July 5, 2001

=== Tritos ===
- Preceded by: Solar eclipse of July 31, 1981
- Followed by: Solar eclipse of May 31, 2003

=== Solar Saros 146 ===
- Preceded by: Solar eclipse of June 20, 1974
- Followed by: Solar eclipse of July 11, 2010

=== Inex ===
- Preceded by: Solar eclipse of July 20, 1963
- Followed by: Solar eclipse of June 10, 2021

=== Triad ===
- Preceded by: Solar eclipse of August 30, 1905
- Followed by: Solar eclipse of May 1, 2079

=== Solar eclipses of 1990–1992 ===
This eclipse is a member of a semester series. An eclipse in a semester series of solar eclipses repeats approximately every 177 days and 4 hours (a semester) at alternating nodes of the Moon's orbit.

Solar eclipse series sets from 1990 to 1992
Ascending node			Descending node		
Saros	Map	Gamma	Saros	Map	Gamma
121	January 26, 1990 Annular	−0.9457	126 Partial in Finland	July 22, 1990 Total	0.7597
131	January 15, 1991 Annular	−0.2727	136 Totality in Playas del Coco, Costa Rica	July 11, 1991 Total	−0.0041
141	January 4, 1992 Annular	0.4091	146	June 30, 1992 Total	−0.7512
151	December 24, 1992 Partial	1.0711			

=== Saros 146 ===
This eclipse is a part of Saros series 146, repeating every 18 years, 11 days, and containing 76 events. The series started with a partial solar eclipse on September 19, 1541. It contains total eclipses from May 29, 1938 through October 7, 2154; hybrid eclipses from October 17, 2172 through November 20, 2226; and annular eclipses from November 30, 2244 through August 10, 2659. The series ends at member 76 as a partial eclipse on December 29, 2893. Its eclipses are tabulated in three columns; every third eclipse in the same column is one exeligmos apart, so they all cast shadows over approximately the same parts of the Earth.

The longest duration of totality was produced by member 26 at 5 minutes, 21 seconds on June 30, 1992, and the longest duration of annularity will be produced by member 63 at 3 minutes, 30 seconds on August 10, 2659. All eclipses in this series occur at the Moon’s descending node of orbit.

Series members 16–37 occur between 1801 and 2200:
16	17	18
March 13, 1812	March 24, 1830	April 3, 1848
19	20	21
April 15, 1866	April 25, 1884	May 7, 1902
22	23	24
May 18, 1920	May 29, 1938	June 8, 1956
25	26	27
June 20, 1974	June 30, 1992	July 11, 2010
28	29	30
July 22, 2028	August 2, 2046	August 12, 2064
31	32	33
August 24, 2082	September 4, 2100	September 15, 2118
34	35	36
September 26, 2136	October 7, 2154	October 17, 2172
37
October 29, 2190

=== Metonic series ===
The metonic series repeats eclipses every 19 years (6939.69 days), lasting about 5 cycles. Eclipses occur in nearly the same calendar date. In addition, the octon subseries repeats 1/5 of that or every 3.8 years (1387.94 days). All eclipses in this table occur at the Moon's descending node.

22 eclipse events between September 12, 1931 and July 1, 2011
September 11–12	June 30–July 1	April 17–19	February 4–5	November 22–23
114	116	118	120	122
September 12, 1931	June 30, 1935	April 19, 1939	February 4, 1943	November 23, 1946
124	126	128	130	132
September 12, 1950	June 30, 1954	April 19, 1958	February 5, 1962	November 23, 1965
134	136	138	140	142
September 11, 1969	June 30, 1973	April 18, 1977	February 4, 1981	November 22, 1984
144	146	148	150	152
September 11, 1988	June 30, 1992	April 17, 1996	February 5, 2000	November 23, 2003
154	156			
September 11, 2007	July 1, 2011			

=== Tritos series ===
This eclipse is a part of a tritos cycle, repeating at alternating nodes every 135 synodic months (≈ 3986.63 days, or 11 years minus 1 month). Their appearance and longitude are irregular due to a lack of synchronization with the anomalistic month (period of perigee), but groupings of 3 tritos cycles (≈ 33 years minus 3 months) come close (≈ 434.044 anomalistic months), so eclipses are similar in these groupings.

The partial solar eclipses on December 18, 2188 (part of Saros 164) and November 18, 2199 (part of Saros 165) are also a part of this series but are not included in the table below.

Series members between 1801 and 2134
December 10, 1806 (Saros 129)	November 9, 1817 (Saros 130)	October 9, 1828 (Saros 131)	September 7, 1839 (Saros 132)	August 7, 1850 (Saros 133)
July 8, 1861 (Saros 134)	June 6, 1872 (Saros 135)	May 6, 1883 (Saros 136)	April 6, 1894 (Saros 137)	March 6, 1905 (Saros 138)
February 3, 1916 (Saros 139)	January 3, 1927 (Saros 140)	December 2, 1937 (Saros 141)	November 1, 1948 (Saros 142)	October 2, 1959 (Saros 143)
August 31, 1970 (Saros 144)	July 31, 1981 (Saros 145)	June 30, 1992 (Saros 146)	May 31, 2003 (Saros 147)	April 29, 2014 (Saros 148)
March 29, 2025 (Saros 149)	February 27, 2036 (Saros 150)	January 26, 2047 (Saros 151)	December 26, 2057 (Saros 152)	November 24, 2068 (Saros 153)
October 24, 2079 (Saros 154)	September 23, 2090 (Saros 155)	August 24, 2101 (Saros 156)	July 23, 2112 (Saros 157)	June 23, 2123 (Saros 158)
May 23, 2134 (Saros 159)

=== Inex series ===
This eclipse is a part of the long period inex cycle, repeating at alternating nodes, every 358 synodic months (≈ 10,571.95 days, or 29 years minus 20 days). Their appearance and longitude are irregular due to a lack of synchronization with the anomalistic month (period of perigee). However, groupings of 3 inex cycles (≈ 87 years minus 2 months) comes close (≈ 1,151.02 anomalistic months), so eclipses are similar in these groupings.

Series members between 1801 and 2200
October 29, 1818 (Saros 140)	October 9, 1847 (Saros 141)	September 17, 1876 (Saros 142)
August 30, 1905 (Saros 143)	August 10, 1934 (Saros 144)	July 20, 1963 (Saros 145)
June 30, 1992 (Saros 146)	June 10, 2021 (Saros 147)	May 20, 2050 (Saros 148)
May 1, 2079 (Saros 149)	April 11, 2108 (Saros 150)	March 21, 2137 (Saros 151)
March 2, 2166 (Saros 152)	February 10, 2195 (Saros 153)	
