= Solar eclipse of June 20, 1974 =

Total eclipse

- Total eclipse
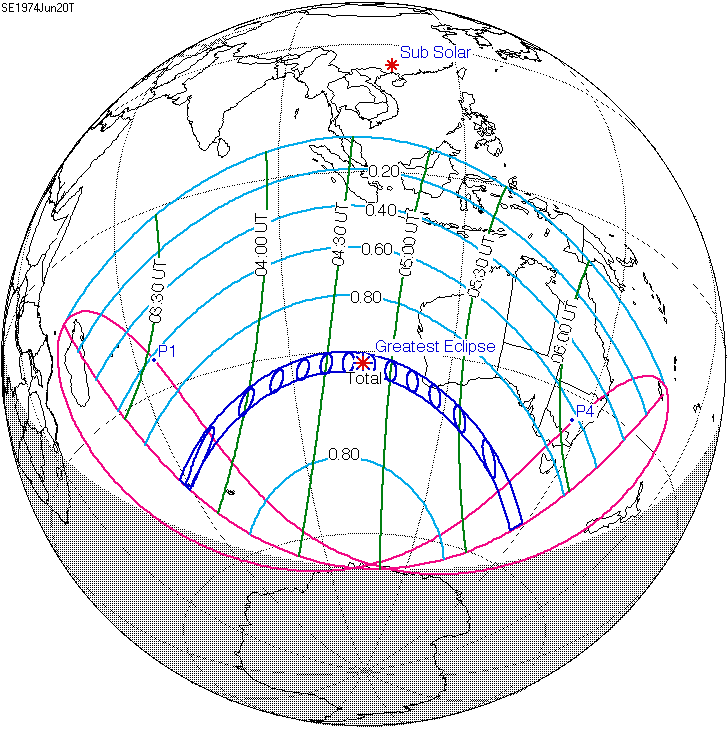
- Map
- Gamma: −0.8239
- Magnitude: 1.0592

Maximum eclipse
- Duration: 309 s (5 min 9 s)
- Coordinates: 32.1°S 103.7°E
- Max. width of band: 344 km (214 mi)

Times (UTC)
- Greatest eclipse: 4:48:04

References
- Saros: 146 (25 of 76)
- Catalog # (SE5000): 9452

A total solar eclipse occurred at the Moon's descending node of orbit on Thursday, June 20, 1974, with a magnitude of 1.0592. A solar eclipse occurs when the Moon passes between Earth and the Sun, thereby totally or partly obscuring the view of the Sun for a viewer on Earth. A total solar eclipse occurs when the Moon's apparent diameter is larger than the Sun's, blocking all direct sunlight, turning day into darkness. Totality occurs in a narrow path across Earth's surface, with the partial solar eclipse visible over a surrounding region thousands of kilometres wide. Occurring about 1.4 days before perigee (on June 21, 1974, at 14:50 UTC), the Moon's apparent diameter was larger.

The path of totality passed over the Indian Ocean, Amsterdam Island, and Western Australia. A partial eclipse was visible for parts of the Malagasy Republic (today's Madagascar), Indonesia, Australia, and the southwestern coast of South Island, New Zealand.

== Eclipse details ==
Shown below are two tables displaying details about this particular solar eclipse. The first table outlines times at which the Moon's penumbra or umbra attains the specific parameter, and the second table describes various other parameters pertaining to this eclipse.

June 20, 1974 Solar Eclipse Times
Event	Time (UTC)
First Penumbral External Contact	1974 June 20 at 02:33:32.2 UTC
First Umbral External Contact	1974 June 20 at 03:47:06.1 UTC
First Central Line	1974 June 20 at 03:49:24.2 UTC
First Umbral Internal Contact	1974 June 20 at 03:51:46.3 UTC
Greatest Duration	1974 June 20 at 04:47:57.2 UTC
Greatest Eclipse	1974 June 20 at 04:48:04.4 UTC
Equatorial Conjunction	1974 June 20 at 04:55:25.3 UTC
Ecliptic Conjunction	1974 June 20 at 04:56:24.3 UTC
Last Umbral Internal Contact	1974 June 20 at 05:44:15.8 UTC
Last Central Line	1974 June 20 at 05:46:39.4 UTC
Last Umbral External Contact	1974 June 20 at 05:48:59.2 UTC
Last Penumbral External Contact	1974 June 20 at 07:02:30.3 UTC

June 20, 1974 Solar Eclipse Parameters
Parameter	Value
Eclipse Magnitude	1.05919
Eclipse Obscuration	1.12189
Gamma	−0.82388
Sun Right Ascension	05h53m26.3s
Sun Declination	+23°26'00.3"
Sun Semi-Diameter	15'44.3"
Sun Equatorial Horizontal Parallax	08.7"
Moon Right Ascension	05h53m07.9s
Moon Declination	+22°36'22.0"
Moon Semi-Diameter	16'30.9"
Moon Equatorial Horizontal Parallax	1°00'36.8"
ΔT	44.9 s

== Eclipse season ==
This eclipse is part of an eclipse season, a period, roughly every six months, when eclipses occur. Only two (or occasionally three) eclipse seasons occur each year, and each season lasts about 35 days and repeats just short of six months (173 days) later; thus two full eclipse seasons always occur each year. Either two or three eclipses happen each eclipse season. In the sequence below, each eclipse is separated by a fortnight.

Eclipse season of June 1974
June 4 Ascending node (full moon)	June 20 Descending node (new moon)
Partial lunar eclipse Lunar Saros 120	Total solar eclipse Solar Saros 146

== Related eclipses ==
=== Eclipses in 1974 ===
- A partial lunar eclipse on June 4.
- A total solar eclipse on June 20.
- A total lunar eclipse on November 29.
- A partial solar eclipse on December 13.

=== Metonic ===
- Preceded by: Solar eclipse of August 31, 1970
- Followed by: Solar eclipse of April 7, 1978

=== Tzolkinex ===
- Preceded by: Solar eclipse of May 9, 1967
- Followed by: Solar eclipse of July 31, 1981

=== Half-Saros ===
- Preceded by: Lunar eclipse of June 14, 1965
- Followed by: Lunar eclipse of June 25, 1983

=== Tritos ===
- Preceded by: Solar eclipse of July 20, 1963
- Followed by: Solar eclipse of May 19, 1985

=== Solar Saros 146 ===
- Preceded by: Solar eclipse of June 8, 1956
- Followed by: Solar eclipse of June 30, 1992

=== Inex ===
- Preceded by: Solar eclipse of July 9, 1945
- Followed by: Solar eclipse of May 31, 2003

=== Triad ===
- Preceded by: Solar eclipse of August 19, 1887
- Followed by: Solar eclipse of April 20, 2061

=== Solar eclipses of 1971–1974 ===
This eclipse is a member of a semester series. An eclipse in a semester series of solar eclipses repeats approximately every 177 days and 4 hours (a semester) at alternating nodes of the Moon's orbit.

The partial solar eclipses on February 25, 1971 and August 20, 1971 occur in the previous lunar year eclipse set.

Solar eclipse series sets from 1971 to 1974
Descending node			Ascending node		
Saros	Map	Gamma	Saros	Map	Gamma
116	July 22, 1971 Partial	1.513	121	January 16, 1972 Annular	−0.9365
126	July 10, 1972 Total	0.6872	131	January 4, 1973 Annular	−0.2644
136	June 30, 1973 Total	−0.0785	141	December 24, 1973 Annular	0.4171
146	June 20, 1974 Total	−0.8239	151	December 13, 1974 Partial	1.0797

=== Saros 146 ===
This eclipse is a part of Saros series 146, repeating every 18 years, 11 days, and containing 76 events. The series started with a partial solar eclipse on September 19, 1541. It contains total eclipses from May 29, 1938 through October 7, 2154; hybrid eclipses from October 17, 2172 through November 20, 2226; and annular eclipses from November 30, 2244 through August 10, 2659. The series ends at member 76 as a partial eclipse on December 29, 2893. Its eclipses are tabulated in three columns; every third eclipse in the same column is one exeligmos apart, so they all cast shadows over approximately the same parts of the Earth.

The longest duration of totality was produced by member 26 at 5 minutes, 21 seconds on June 30, 1992, and the longest duration of annularity will be produced by member 63 at 3 minutes, 30 seconds on August 10, 2659. All eclipses in this series occur at the Moon’s descending node of orbit.

Series members 16–37 occur between 1801 and 2200:
16	17	18
March 13, 1812	March 24, 1830	April 3, 1848
19	20	21
April 15, 1866	April 25, 1884	May 7, 1902
22	23	24
May 18, 1920	May 29, 1938	June 8, 1956
25	26	27
June 20, 1974	June 30, 1992	July 11, 2010
28	29	30
July 22, 2028	August 2, 2046	August 12, 2064
31	32	33
August 24, 2082	September 4, 2100	September 15, 2118
34	35	36
September 26, 2136	October 7, 2154	October 17, 2172
37
October 29, 2190

=== Metonic series ===
The metonic series repeats eclipses every 19 years (6939.69 days), lasting about 5 cycles. Eclipses occur in nearly the same calendar date. In addition, the octon subseries repeats 1/5 of that or every 3.8 years (1387.94 days). All eclipses in this table occur at the Moon's descending node.

22 eclipse events between April 8, 1902 and August 31, 1989
April 7–8	January 24–25	November 12	August 31–September 1	June 19–20
108	110	112	114	116
April 8, 1902			August 31, 1913	June 19, 1917
118	120	122	124	126
April 8, 1921	January 24, 1925	November 12, 1928	August 31, 1932	June 19, 1936
128	130	132	134	136
April 7, 1940	January 25, 1944	November 12, 1947	September 1, 1951	June 20, 1955
138	140	142	144	146
April 8, 1959	January 25, 1963	November 12, 1966	August 31, 1970	June 20, 1974
148	150	152	154	
April 7, 1978	January 25, 1982	November 12, 1985	August 31, 1989	

=== Tritos series ===
This eclipse is a part of a tritos cycle, repeating at alternating nodes every 135 synodic months (≈ 3986.63 days, or 11 years minus 1 month). Their appearance and longitude are irregular due to a lack of synchronization with the anomalistic month (period of perigee), but groupings of 3 tritos cycles (≈ 33 years minus 3 months) come close (≈ 434.044 anomalistic months), so eclipses are similar in these groupings.

The partial solar eclipses on December 7, 2170 (part of Saros 164) and November 7, 2181 (part of Saros 165) are also a part of this series but are not included in the table below.

Series members between 1801 and 2105
September 28, 1810 (Saros 131)	August 27, 1821 (Saros 132)	July 27, 1832 (Saros 133)	June 27, 1843 (Saros 134)	May 26, 1854 (Saros 135)
April 25, 1865 (Saros 136)	March 25, 1876 (Saros 137)	February 22, 1887 (Saros 138)	January 22, 1898 (Saros 139)	December 23, 1908 (Saros 140)
November 22, 1919 (Saros 141)	October 21, 1930 (Saros 142)	September 21, 1941 (Saros 143)	August 20, 1952 (Saros 144)	July 20, 1963 (Saros 145)
June 20, 1974 (Saros 146)	May 19, 1985 (Saros 147)	April 17, 1996 (Saros 148)	March 19, 2007 (Saros 149)	February 15, 2018 (Saros 150)
January 14, 2029 (Saros 151)	December 15, 2039 (Saros 152)	November 14, 2050 (Saros 153)	October 13, 2061 (Saros 154)	September 12, 2072 (Saros 155)
August 13, 2083 (Saros 156)	July 12, 2094 (Saros 157)	June 12, 2105 (Saros 158)		

=== Inex series ===
This eclipse is a part of the long period inex cycle, repeating at alternating nodes, every 358 synodic months (≈ 10,571.95 days, or 29 years minus 20 days). Their appearance and longitude are irregular due to a lack of synchronization with the anomalistic month (period of perigee). However, groupings of 3 inex cycles (≈ 87 years minus 2 months) comes close (≈ 1,151.02 anomalistic months), so eclipses are similar in these groupings.

Series members between 1801 and 2200
September 28, 1829 (Saros 141)	September 7, 1858 (Saros 142)	August 19, 1887 (Saros 143)
July 30, 1916 (Saros 144)	July 9, 1945 (Saros 145)	June 20, 1974 (Saros 146)
May 31, 2003 (Saros 147)	May 9, 2032 (Saros 148)	April 20, 2061 (Saros 149)
March 31, 2090 (Saros 150)	March 11, 2119 (Saros 151)	February 19, 2148 (Saros 152)
January 29, 2177 (Saros 153)		
