= June 1965 lunar eclipse =

Partial lunar eclipse June 14, 1965

- Partial eclipse
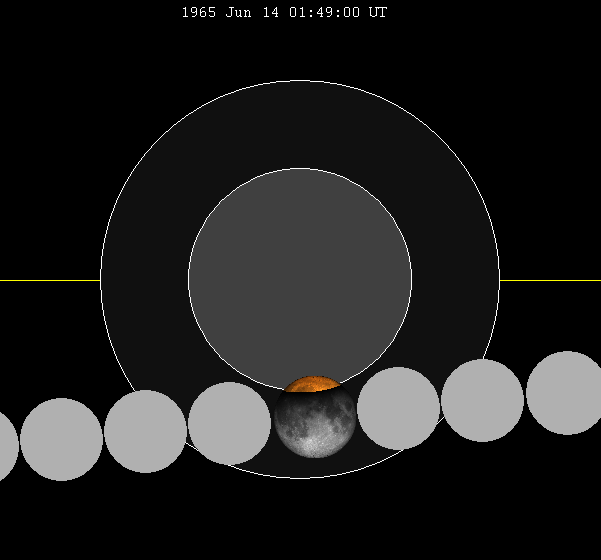
- The Moon's hourly motion shown right to left
- Date: June 14, 1965
- Gamma: −0.9006
- Magnitude: 0.1767
- Saros cycle: 139 (19 of 81)
- Partiality: 100 minutes, 17 seconds
- Penumbral: 302 minutes, 44 seconds
Contacts (UTC)
- P1: 23:17:28
- U1: 0:58:38
- Greatest: 1:48:50
- U4: 2:38:55
- P4: 4:20:12

A partial lunar eclipse occurred at the Moon’s descending node of orbit on Monday, June 14, 1965, with an umbral magnitude of 0.1767. A lunar eclipse occurs when the Moon moves into the Earth's shadow, causing the Moon to be darkened. A partial lunar eclipse occurs when one part of the Moon is in the Earth's umbra, while the other part is in the Earth's penumbra. Unlike a solar eclipse, which can only be viewed from a relatively small area of the world, a lunar eclipse may be viewed from anywhere on the night side of Earth. Occurring about 3.4 days before apogee (on June 17, 1965, at 10:50 UTC), the Moon's apparent diameter was smaller.

== Visibility ==
The eclipse was completely visible over South America, west and southern Africa, and Antarctica, seen rising over North America and the eastern Pacific Ocean and setting over Europe, northeast Africa, and west, central, and south Asia.

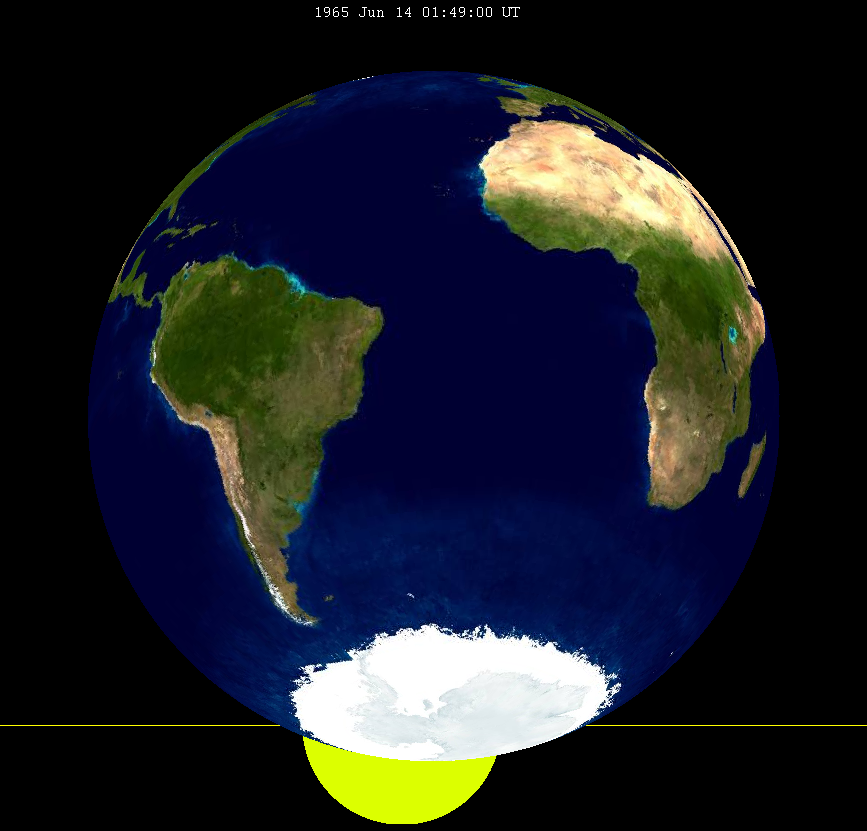
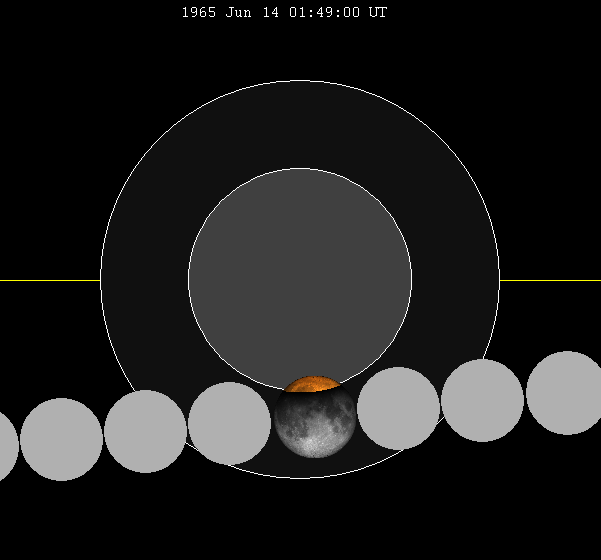

== Eclipse details ==
Shown below is a table displaying details about this particular lunar eclipse. It describes various parameters pertaining to this eclipse.

June 14, 1965 Lunar Eclipse Parameters
Parameter	Value
Penumbral Magnitude	1.23505
Umbral Magnitude	0.17670
Gamma	−0.90055
Sun Right Ascension	05h28m37.7s
Sun Declination	+23°14'54.4"
Sun Semi-Diameter	15'44.8"
Sun Equatorial Horizontal Parallax	08.7"
Moon Right Ascension	17h28m04.9s
Moon Declination	-24°03'29.9"
Moon Semi-Diameter	14'52.7"
Moon Equatorial Horizontal Parallax	0°54'36.3"
ΔT	36.1 s

== Eclipse season ==
This eclipse is part of an eclipse season, a period, roughly every six months, when eclipses occur. Only two (or occasionally three) eclipse seasons occur each year, and each season lasts about 35 days and repeats just short of six months (173 days) later; thus two full eclipse seasons always occur each year. Either two or three eclipses happen each eclipse season. In the sequence below, each eclipse is separated by a fortnight.

Eclipse season of May–June 1965
May 30 Ascending node (new moon)	June 14 Descending node (full moon)
Total solar eclipse Solar Saros 127	Partial lunar eclipse Lunar Saros 139

== Related eclipses ==
=== Eclipses in 1965 ===
- A total solar eclipse on May 30.
- A partial lunar eclipse on June 14.
- An annular solar eclipse on November 23.
- A penumbral lunar eclipse on December 8.

=== Metonic ===
- Preceded by: Lunar eclipse of August 26, 1961
- Followed by: Lunar eclipse of April 2, 1969

=== Tzolkinex ===
- Preceded by: Lunar eclipse of May 3, 1958
- Followed by: Lunar eclipse of July 26, 1972

=== Half-Saros ===
- Preceded by: Solar eclipse of June 8, 1956
- Followed by: Solar eclipse of June 20, 1974

=== Tritos ===
- Preceded by: Lunar eclipse of July 16, 1954
- Followed by: Lunar eclipse of May 13, 1976

=== Lunar Saros 139 ===
- Preceded by: Lunar eclipse of June 3, 1947
- Followed by: Lunar eclipse of June 25, 1983

=== Inex ===
- Preceded by: Lunar eclipse of July 4, 1936
- Followed by: Lunar eclipse of May 25, 1994

=== Triad ===
- Preceded by: Lunar eclipse of August 13, 1878
- Followed by: Lunar eclipse of April 14, 2052

=== Lunar eclipses of 1962–1965 ===
This eclipse is a member of a semester series. An eclipse in a semester series of lunar eclipses repeats approximately every 177 days and 4 hours (a semester) at alternating nodes of the Moon's orbit.

The penumbral lunar eclipses on February 19, 1962 and August 15, 1962 occur in the previous lunar year eclipse set.

Lunar eclipse series sets from 1962 to 1965
Descending node				Ascending node			
Saros	Date Viewing	Type Chart	Gamma	Saros	Date Viewing	Type Chart	Gamma
109	1962 Jul 17	Penumbral	1.3371	114	1963 Jan 09	Penumbral	−1.0128
119	1963 Jul 06	Partial	0.6197	124	1963 Dec 30	Total	−0.2889
129	1964 Jun 25	Total	−0.1461	134	1964 Dec 19	Total	0.3801
139	1965 Jun 14	Partial	−0.9006	144	1965 Dec 08	Penumbral	1.0775

=== Saros 139 ===
This eclipse is a part of Saros series 139, repeating every 18 years, 11 days, and containing 79 events. The series started with a penumbral lunar eclipse on December 9, 1658. It contains partial eclipses from June 3, 1947 through August 7, 2055; total eclipses from August 17, 2073 through May 30, 2542; and a second set of partial eclipses from June 9, 2560 through August 25, 2686. The series ends at member 75 as a penumbral eclipse on April 13, 3065.

The longest duration of totality will be produced by member 31 at 102 minutes, 39 seconds on November 2, 2199. All eclipses in this series occur at the Moon’s descending node of orbit.

Greatest	First			
The greatest eclipse of the series will occur on 2199 Nov 02, lasting 102 minutes, 39 seconds.	Penumbral	Partial	Total	Central
The greatest eclipse of the series will occur on 2199 Nov 02, lasting 102 minutes, 39 seconds.	1658 Dec 09	1947 Jun 03	2073 Aug 17	2109 Sep 09
The greatest eclipse of the series will occur on 2199 Nov 02, lasting 102 minutes, 39 seconds.	Last			
The greatest eclipse of the series will occur on 2199 Nov 02, lasting 102 minutes, 39 seconds.	Central	Total	Partial	Penumbral
The greatest eclipse of the series will occur on 2199 Nov 02, lasting 102 minutes, 39 seconds.	2488 Apr 26	2542 May 30	2686 Aug 25	3065 Apr 13

Eclipses are tabulated in three columns; every third eclipse in the same column is one exeligmos apart, so they all cast shadows over approximately the same parts of the Earth.

Series members 9–31 occur between 1801 and 2200:
9	10	11
1803 Mar 08	1821 Mar 18	1839 Mar 30
12	13	14
1857 Apr 09	1875 Apr 20	1893 Apr 30
15	16	17
1911 May 13	1929 May 23	1947 Jun 03
18	19	20
1965 Jun 14	1983 Jun 25	2001 Jul 05
21	22	23
2019 Jul 16	2037 Jul 27	2055 Aug 07
24	25	26
2073 Aug 17	2091 Aug 29	2109 Sep 09
27	28	29
2127 Sep 20	2145 Sep 30	2163 Oct 12
30	31	
2181 Oct 22	2199 Nov 02	

=== Tritos series ===
This eclipse is a part of a tritos cycle, repeating at alternating nodes every 135 synodic months (≈ 3986.63 days, or 11 years minus 1 month). Their appearance and longitude are irregular due to a lack of synchronization with the anomalistic month (period of perigee), but groupings of 3 tritos cycles (≈ 33 years minus 3 months) come close (≈ 434.044 anomalistic months), so eclipses are similar in these groupings.

Series members between 1801 and 2183
1801 Sep 22 (Saros 124)	1812 Aug 22 (Saros 125)	1823 Jul 23 (Saros 126)	1834 Jun 21 (Saros 127)	1845 May 21 (Saros 128)
1856 Apr 20 (Saros 129)	1867 Mar 20 (Saros 130)	1878 Feb 17 (Saros 131)	1889 Jan 17 (Saros 132)	1899 Dec 17 (Saros 133)
1910 Nov 17 (Saros 134)	1921 Oct 16 (Saros 135)	1932 Sep 14 (Saros 136)	1943 Aug 15 (Saros 137)	1954 Jul 16 (Saros 138)
1965 Jun 14 (Saros 139)	1976 May 13 (Saros 140)	1987 Apr 14 (Saros 141)	1998 Mar 13 (Saros 142)	2009 Feb 09 (Saros 143)
2020 Jan 10 (Saros 144)	2030 Dec 09 (Saros 145)	2041 Nov 08 (Saros 146)	2052 Oct 08 (Saros 147)	2063 Sep 07 (Saros 148)
2074 Aug 07 (Saros 149)	2085 Jul 07 (Saros 150)	2096 Jun 06 (Saros 151)	2107 May 07 (Saros 152)	
		2151 Jan 02 (Saros 156)		2172 Oct 31 (Saros 158)
2183 Oct 01 (Saros 159)

=== Inex series ===
This eclipse is a part of the long period inex cycle, repeating at alternating nodes, every 358 synodic months (≈ 10,571.95 days, or 29 years minus 20 days). Their appearance and longitude are irregular due to a lack of synchronization with the anomalistic month (period of perigee). However, groupings of 3 inex cycles (≈ 87 years minus 2 months) comes close (≈ 1,151.02 anomalistic months), so eclipses are similar in these groupings.

Series members between 1801 and 2200
1820 Sep 22 (Saros 134)	1849 Sep 02 (Saros 135)	1878 Aug 13 (Saros 136)
1907 Jul 25 (Saros 137)	1936 Jul 04 (Saros 138)	1965 Jun 14 (Saros 139)
1994 May 25 (Saros 140)	2023 May 05 (Saros 141)	2052 Apr 14 (Saros 142)
2081 Mar 25 (Saros 143)	2110 Mar 06 (Saros 144)	2139 Feb 13 (Saros 145)
2168 Jan 24 (Saros 146)	2197 Jan 04 (Saros 147)	

=== Half-Saros cycle ===
A lunar eclipse will be preceded and followed by solar eclipses by 9 years and 5.5 days (a half saros). This lunar eclipse is related to two total solar eclipses of Solar Saros 146.

June 8, 1956	June 20, 1974

== See also ==
- List of lunar eclipses
- List of 20th-century lunar eclipses
