= Solar eclipse of May 29, 1938 =

Total eclipse

- Total eclipse
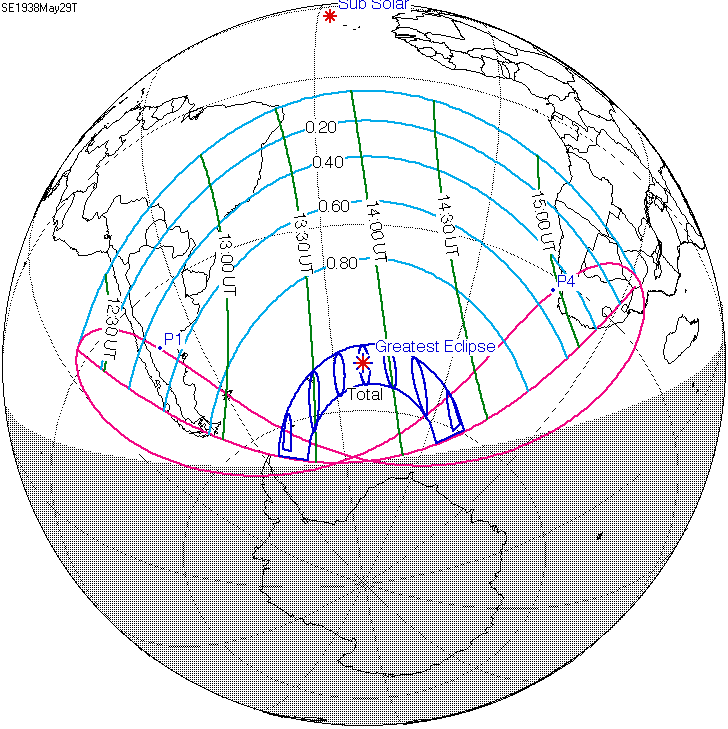
- Map
- Gamma: −0.9607
- Magnitude: 1.0552

Maximum eclipse
- Duration: 245 s (4 min 5 s)
- Coordinates: 52.7°S 22°W
- Max. width of band: 675 km (419 mi)

Times (UTC)
- Greatest eclipse: 13:50:19

References
- Saros: 146 (23 of 76)
- Catalog # (SE5000): 9371

A total solar eclipse occurred at the Moon's descending node of orbit on Sunday, May 29, 1938, with a magnitude of 1.0552. A solar eclipse occurs when the Moon passes between Earth and the Sun, thereby totally or partly obscuring the image of the Sun for a viewer on Earth. A total solar eclipse occurs when the Moon's apparent diameter is larger than the Sun's, blocking all direct sunlight, turning day into darkness. Totality occurs in a narrow path across Earth's surface, with the partial solar eclipse visible over a surrounding region thousands of kilometres wide. Occurring about 1.2 days before perigee (on May 30, 1938, at 17:30 UTC), the Moon's apparent diameter was larger.

The path of totality was mostly on the sea. The only land that was covered was South Orkney Islands of Antarctica, as well as South Georgia except for its northwestern part, Zavodovski Island and Visokoi Island controlled by the United Kingdom. A partial eclipse was visible for parts of southern and central South America and Southern Africa. This was the first of 41 umbral eclipses of Solar Saros 146.

== Eclipse details ==
Shown below are two tables displaying details about this particular solar eclipse. The first table outlines times at which the Moon's penumbra or umbra attains the specific parameter, and the second table describes various other parameters pertaining to this eclipse.

May 29, 1938 solar eclipse times
Event	Time (UTC)
First penumbral external contact	1938 May 29 at 11:46:36.9 UTC
First umbral external contact	1938 May 29 at 13:17:53.5 UTC
First central line	1938 May 29 at 13:22:34.9 UTC
First umbral internal contact	1938 May 29 at 13:28:10.1 UTC
Equatorial conjunction	1938 May 29 at 13:43:32.0 UTC
Greatest eclipse	1938 May 29 at 13:50:18.5 UTC
Greatest duration	1938 May 29 at 13:50:38.6 UTC
Ecliptic conjunction	1938 May 29 at 13:59:56.4 UTC
Last umbral internal contact	1938 May 29 at 14:12:30.3 UTC
Last central line	1938 May 29 at 14:18:06.8 UTC
Last umbral external contact	1938 May 29 at 14:22:49.5 UTC
Last penumbral external contact	1938 May 29 at 15:54:00.6 UTC

May 29, 1938 solar eclipse parameters
Parameter	Value
Eclipse magnitude	1.05523
Eclipse obscuration	1.11351
Gamma	−0.96068
Sun right ascension	04h22m54.3s
Sun declination	+21°34'16.3"
Sun semi-diameter	15'46.6"
Sun equatorial horizontal parallax	08.7"
Moon right ascension	04h23m11.2s
Moon declination	+20°36'05.3"
Moon semi-diameter	16'34.8"
Moon equatorial horizontal parallax	1°00'50.8"
ΔT	24.0 s

== Eclipse season ==
This eclipse is part of an eclipse season, a period, roughly every six months, when eclipses occur. Only two (or occasionally three) eclipse seasons occur each year, and each season lasts about 35 days and repeats just short of six months (173 days) later; thus two full eclipse seasons always occur each year. Either two or three eclipses happen each eclipse season. In the sequence below, each eclipse is separated by a fortnight.

Eclipse season of May 1938
May 14 Ascending node (full moon)	May 29 Descending node (new moon)
Total lunar eclipse Lunar Saros 120	Total solar eclipse Solar Saros 146

== Related eclipses ==
=== Eclipses in 1938 ===
- A total lunar eclipse on May 14.
- A total solar eclipse on May 29.
- A total lunar eclipse on November 7.
- A partial solar eclipse on November 21.

=== Metonic ===
- Preceded by: Solar eclipse of August 10, 1934
- Followed by: Solar eclipse of March 16, 1942

=== Tzolkinex ===
- Preceded by: Solar eclipse of April 18, 1931
- Followed by: Solar eclipse of July 9, 1945

=== Half-Saros ===
- Preceded by: Lunar eclipse of May 23, 1929
- Followed by: Lunar eclipse of June 3, 1947

=== Tritos ===
- Preceded by: Solar eclipse of June 29, 1927
- Followed by: Solar eclipse of April 28, 1949

=== Solar Saros 146 ===
- Preceded by: Solar eclipse of May 18, 1920
- Followed by: Solar eclipse of June 8, 1956

=== Inex ===
- Preceded by: Solar eclipse of June 17, 1909
- Followed by: Solar eclipse of May 9, 1967

=== Triad ===
- Preceded by: Solar eclipse of July 28, 1851
- Followed by: Solar eclipse of March 29, 2025

=== Solar eclipses of 1935–1938 ===
This eclipse is a member of a semester series. An eclipse in a semester series of solar eclipses repeats approximately every 177 days and 4 hours (a semester) at alternating nodes of the Moon's orbit.

The partial solar eclipses on February 3, 1935 and July 30, 1935 occur in the previous lunar year eclipse set.

Solar eclipse series sets from 1935 to 1938
Ascending node			Descending node		
Saros	Map	Gamma	Saros	Map	Gamma
111	January 5, 1935 Partial	−1.5381	116	June 30, 1935 Partial	1.3623
121	December 25, 1935 Annular	−0.9228	126	June 19, 1936 Total	0.5389
131	December 13, 1936 Annular	−0.2493	136 Totality in Kanton Island, Kiribati	June 8, 1937 Total	−0.2253
141	December 2, 1937 Annular	0.4389	146	May 29, 1938 Total	−0.9607
151	November 21, 1938 Partial	1.1077			

=== Saros 146 ===
This eclipse is a part of Saros series 146, repeating every 18 years, 11 days, and containing 76 events. The series started with a partial solar eclipse on September 19, 1541. It contains total eclipses from May 29, 1938 through October 7, 2154; hybrid eclipses from October 17, 2172 through November 20, 2226; and annular eclipses from November 30, 2244 through August 10, 2659. The series ends at member 76 as a partial eclipse on December 29, 2893. Its eclipses are tabulated in three columns; every third eclipse in the same column is one exeligmos apart, so they all cast shadows over approximately the same parts of the Earth.

The longest duration of totality was produced by member 26 at 5 minutes, 21 seconds on June 30, 1992, and the longest duration of annularity will be produced by member 63 at 3 minutes, 30 seconds on August 10, 2659. All eclipses in this series occur at the Moon’s descending node of orbit.

Series members 16–37 occur between 1801 and 2200:
16	17	18
March 13, 1812	March 24, 1830	April 3, 1848
19	20	21
April 15, 1866	April 25, 1884	May 7, 1902
22	23	24
May 18, 1920	May 29, 1938	June 8, 1956
25	26	27
June 20, 1974	June 30, 1992	July 11, 2010
28	29	30
July 22, 2028	August 2, 2046	August 12, 2064
31	32	33
August 24, 2082	September 4, 2100	September 15, 2118
34	35	36
September 26, 2136	October 7, 2154	October 17, 2172
37
October 29, 2190

=== Metonic series ===
The metonic series repeats eclipses every 19 years (6939.69 days), lasting about 5 cycles. Eclipses occur in nearly the same calendar date. In addition, the octon subseries repeats 1/5 of that or every 3.8 years (1387.94 days). All eclipses in this table occur at the Moon's descending node.

22 eclipse events between March 16, 1866 and August 9, 1953
March 16–17	January 1–3	October 20–22	August 9–10	May 27–29
108	110	112	114	116
March 16, 1866			August 9, 1877	May 27, 1881
118	120	122	124	126
March 16, 1885	January 1, 1889	October 20, 1892	August 9, 1896	May 28, 1900
128	130	132	134	136
March 17, 1904	January 3, 1908	October 22, 1911	August 10, 1915	May 29, 1919
138	140	142	144	146
March 17, 1923	January 3, 1927	October 21, 1930	August 10, 1934	May 29, 1938
148	150	152	154	
March 16, 1942	January 3, 1946	October 21, 1949	August 9, 1953	

=== Tritos series ===
This eclipse is a part of a tritos cycle, repeating at alternating nodes every 135 synodic months (≈ 3986.63 days, or 11 years minus 1 month). Their appearance and longitude are irregular due to a lack of synchronization with the anomalistic month (period of perigee), but groupings of 3 tritos cycles (≈ 33 years minus 3 months) come close (≈ 434.044 anomalistic months), so eclipses are similar in these groupings.

The partial solar eclipses on November 16, 2134 (part of Saros 164) and October 16, 2145 (part of Saros 165) are also a part of this series but are not included in the table below.

Series members between 1801 and 2069
June 6, 1807 (Saros 134)	May 5, 1818 (Saros 135)	April 3, 1829 (Saros 136)	March 4, 1840 (Saros 137)	February 1, 1851 (Saros 138)
December 31, 1861 (Saros 139)	November 30, 1872 (Saros 140)	October 30, 1883 (Saros 141)	September 29, 1894 (Saros 142)	August 30, 1905 (Saros 143)
July 30, 1916 (Saros 144)	June 29, 1927 (Saros 145)	May 29, 1938 (Saros 146)	April 28, 1949 (Saros 147)	March 27, 1960 (Saros 148)
February 25, 1971 (Saros 149)	January 25, 1982 (Saros 150)	December 24, 1992 (Saros 151)	November 23, 2003 (Saros 152)	October 23, 2014 (Saros 153)
September 21, 2025 (Saros 154)	August 21, 2036 (Saros 155)	July 22, 2047 (Saros 156)	June 21, 2058 (Saros 157)	May 20, 2069 (Saros 158)

=== Inex series ===
This eclipse is a part of the long period inex cycle, repeating at alternating nodes, every 358 synodic months (≈ 10,571.95 days, or 29 years minus 20 days). Their appearance and longitude are irregular due to a lack of synchronization with the anomalistic month (period of perigee). However, groupings of 3 inex cycles (≈ 87 years minus 2 months) comes close (≈ 1,151.02 anomalistic months), so eclipses are similar in these groupings.

Series members between 1801 and 2200
August 16, 1822 (Saros 142)	July 28, 1851 (Saros 143)	July 7, 1880 (Saros 144)
June 17, 1909 (Saros 145)	May 29, 1938 (Saros 146)	May 9, 1967 (Saros 147)
April 17, 1996 (Saros 148)	March 29, 2025 (Saros 149)	March 9, 2054 (Saros 150)
February 16, 2083 (Saros 151)	January 29, 2112 (Saros 152)	January 8, 2141 (Saros 153)
December 18, 2169 (Saros 154)	November 28, 2198 (Saros 155)	
