= Solar Saros 146 =

Series of solar eclipses

Historic saros cycle animation

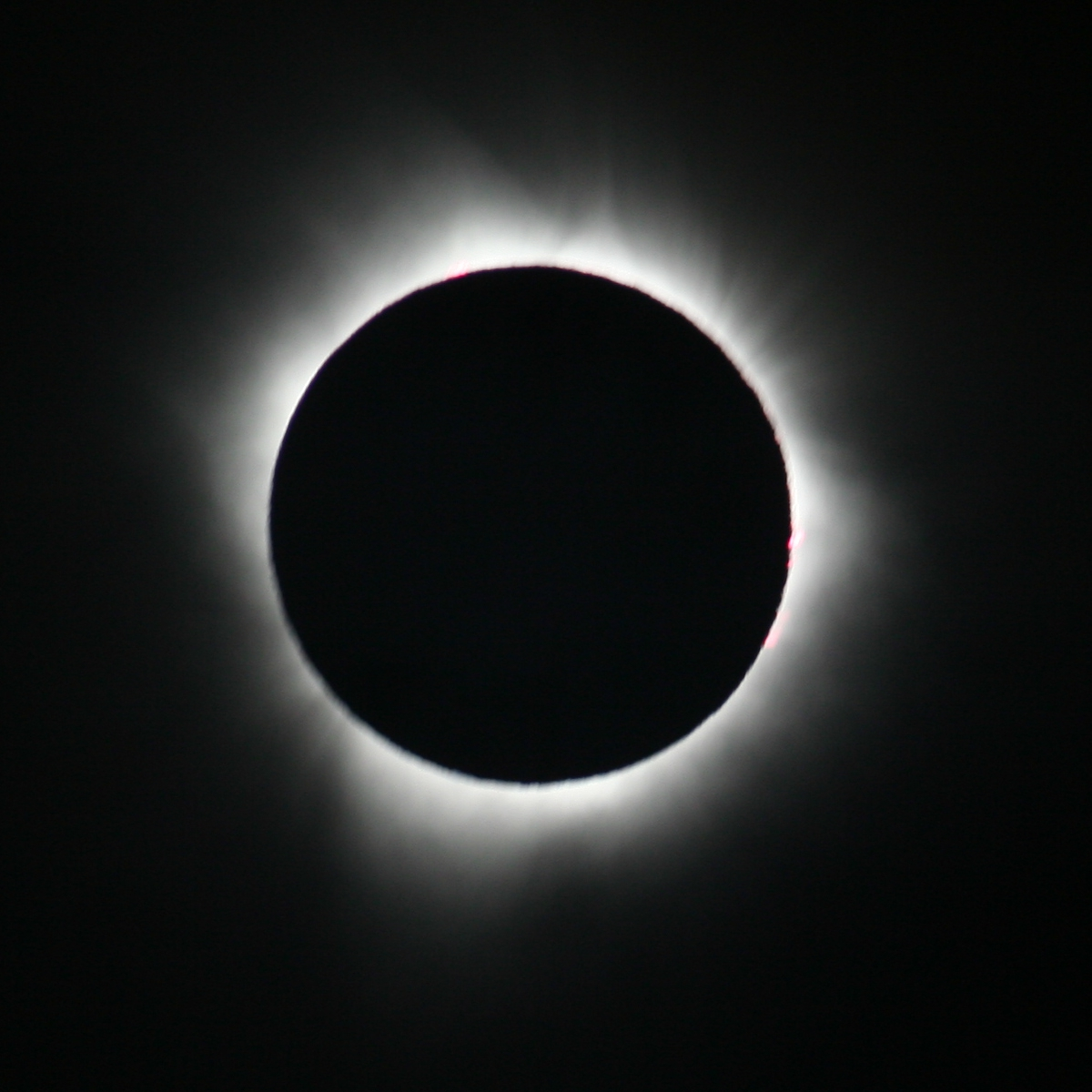
July 11, 2010, total eclipse from French Polynesia

Saros cycle series 146 for solar eclipses occurs at the Moon's descending node, repeating every 18 years, 11 days, containing 76 eclipses, 41 of which are umbral (13 annular, 4 hybrid, and 24 total). The first eclipse of the series was on 19 September 1541 and the last will be on 29 December 2893. The most recent eclipse was a total eclipse on 11 July 2010 and the next will be a total eclipse on 22 July 2028.

The longest duration of totality was 5 minutes 21 seconds on 30 June 1992 and the longest annular eclipse will be 3 minutes 30 seconds on 10 August 2659.

Umbral eclipses began with a series of total eclipses from 29 May 1938 through 7 October 2154, followed by hybrid eclipses from 17 October 2172 to 20 November 2226, and finally annular eclipses from 30 November 2244 through 10 August 2659.

Series members 21-37 occurring between 1901 and 2200:
21	22	23
May 7, 1902	May 18, 1920	May 29, 1938
24	25	26
June 8, 1956	June 20, 1974	June 30, 1992
27	28	29
July 11, 2010	July 22, 2028	August 2, 2046
30	31	32
August 12, 2064	August 24, 2082	September 4, 2100
33	34	35
September 15, 2118	September 26, 2136	October 7, 2154
36	37	
October 17, 2172	October 29, 2190	

== Umbral eclipses ==
Umbral eclipses (annular, total and hybrid) can be further classified as either: 1) Central (two limits), 2) Central (one limit) or 3) Non-Central (one limit). The statistical distribution of these classes in Saros series 146 appears in the following table.

Classification	Number	Percent
All Umbral eclipses	41	100.00%
Central (two limits)	41	100.00%
Central (one limit)	0	0.00%
Non-central (one limit)	0	0.00%

== All eclipses ==
Note: Dates are given in the Julian calendar prior to 15 October 1582, and in the Gregorian calendar after that.

Saros	Member	Date	Time (Greatest) UTC	Type	Location Lat, Long	Gamma	Mag.	Width (km)	Duration (min:sec)	Ref
146	1	September 19, 1541	20:34:01	Partial	61.1S 135.3E	-1.514	0.0378			
146	2	October 1, 1559	4:46:46	Partial	61.3S 3.4E	-1.4772	0.1083			
146	3	October 11, 1577	13:08:02	Partial	61.6S 130.8W	-1.4473	0.1654			
146	4	November 1, 1595	21:36:53	Partial	62.1S 93.1E	-1.4233	0.2111			
146	5	November 12, 1613	6:12:15	Partial	62.7S 44.9W	-1.4048	0.2464			
146	6	November 23, 1631	14:53:44	Partial	63.5S 175.4E	-1.3912	0.2723			
146	7	December 3, 1649	23:40:37	Partial	64.4S 34.1E	-1.382	0.2896			
146	8	December 15, 1667	8:29:59	Partial	65.3S 108.2W	-1.3752	0.3024			
146	9	December 25, 1685	17:22:35	Partial	66.4S 108.3E	-1.371	0.3102			
146	10	January 7, 1704	2:14:51	Partial	67.4S 35.5W	-1.3669	0.3177			
146	11	January 17, 1722	11:07:10	Partial	68.5S 179.9W	-1.3629	0.3251			
146	12	January 28, 1740	19:54:59	Partial	69.5S 36.2E	-1.3555	0.3387			
146	13	February 8, 1758	4:40:52	Partial	70.4S 107.8W	-1.3468	0.3549			
146	14	February 19, 1776	13:20:11	Partial	71.1S 109.2E	-1.3334	0.38			
146	15	March 1, 1794	21:54:00	Partial	71.6S 32.9W	-1.3155	0.4136			
146	16	March 13, 1812	6:19:31	Partial	71.9S 173.3W	-1.2913	0.4594			
146	17	March 24, 1830	14:38:43	Partial	72S 47.7E	-1.2622	0.5148			
146	18	April 3, 1848	22:49:07	Partial	71.8S 89W	-1.2264	0.5834			
146	19	April 15, 1866	6:51:40	Partial	71.4S 136.6E	-1.1846	0.6637			
146	20	April 25, 1884	14:46:17	Partial	70.7S 4.6E	-1.1365	0.7563			
146	21	May 7, 1902	22:34:16	Partial	70S 125.1W	-1.0831	0.8593			
146	22	May 18, 1920	6:14:55	Partial	69.1S 107.7E	-1.0239	0.9734			
146	23	May 29, 1938	13:50:19	Total	52.7S 22W	-0.9607	1.0552	675	4m 5s	
146	24	June 8, 1956	21:20:39	Total	40.8S 140.7W	-0.8934	1.0581	429	4m 45s	
146	25	June 20, 1974	4:48:04	Total	32.1S 103.7E	-0.8239	1.0592	344	5m 9s	
146	26	June 30, 1992	12:11:22	Total	25.2S 9.5W	-0.7512	1.0592	294	5m 21s	
146	27	July 11, 2010	19:34:38	Total	19.7S 121.9W	-0.6788	1.058	259	5m 20s	
146	28	July 22, 2028	2:56:40	Total	15.6S 126.7E	-0.6056	1.056	230	5m 10s	
146	29	August 2, 2046	10:21:13	Total	12.7S 15.2E	-0.535	1.0531	206	4m 51s	
146	30	August 12, 2064	17:46:06	Total	10.9S 96W	-0.4652	1.0495	184	4m 28s	
146	31	August 23–24, 2082	1:16:21	Total	10.3S 151.8E	-0.4004	1.0452	163	4m 1s	
146	32	September 4, 2100	8:49:20	Total	10.5S 39E	-0.3384	1.0402	142	3m 32s	
146	33	September 15, 2118	16:28:26	Total	11.5S 75.2W	-0.2823	1.0349	122	3m 4s	
146	34	September 26, 2136	0:12:14	Total	13S 169.4E	-0.2309	1.0292	101	2m 34s	
146	35	October 7, 2154	8:03:50	Total	15.1S 52.1E	-0.1867	1.0234	81	2m 5s	
146	36	October 17, 2172	16:01:36	Hybrid (Note: Will begin as annular and end as total)	17.3S 66.6W	-0.1484	1.0174	60	1m 34s	
146	37	October 28, 2190	0:05:50	Hybrid	19.6S 173.2E	-0.1161	1.0116	40	1m 4s	
146	38	November 9, 2208	8:17:12	Hybrid	21.8S 51.4E	-0.0905	1.0059	20	0m 34s	
146	39	November 20, 2226	16:34:56	Hybrid	23.7S 71.7W	-0.0711	1.0005	2	0m 3s	
146	40	November 30, 2244	0:58:17	Annular	25.1S 164E	-0.0568	0.9955	16	0m 27s	
146	41	December 12, 2262	9:25:02	Annular	25.8S 39E	-0.0461	0.991	32	0m 56s	
146	42	December 22, 2280	17:55:44	Annular	25.8S 86.8W	-0.0392	0.987	46	1m 23s	
146	43	January 2, 2299	2:27:43	Annular	24.9S 146.9E	-0.0341	0.9836	58	1m 47s	
146	44	January 14, 2317	10:59:38	Annular	23.2S 20.5E	-0.0298	0.9807	69	2m 8s	
146	45	January 25, 2335	19:29:43	Annular	20.6S 105.9W	-0.0247	0.9784	77	2m 25s	
146	46	February 5, 2353	3:56:55	Annular	17.1S 128E	-0.0179	0.9766	84	2m 38s	
146	47	February 16, 2371	12:18:49	Annular	12.9S 2.7E	-0.0075	0.9753	88	2m 48s	
146	48	February 26, 2389	20:33:52	Annular	8.1S 121.3W	0.0078	0.9744	92	2m 55s	
146	49	March 10, 2407	4:41:40	Annular	2.7S 116.1E	0.0283	0.9739	93	2m 59s	
146	50	March 20, 2425	12:41:12	Annular	3.1N 4.7W	0.0546	0.9735	95	3m 2s	
146	51	March 31, 2443	20:30:25	Annular	9.3N 123.1W	0.0889	0.9734	95	3m 2s	
146	52	April 11, 2461	4:10:36	Annular	15.8N 120.8E	0.13	0.9732	97	3m 2s	
146	53	April 22, 2479	11:40:30	Annular	22.5N 7.5E	0.179	0.9731	98	3m 1s	
146	54	May 2, 2497	19:01:52	Annular	29.2N 103.2W	0.2341	0.9727	100	2m 59s	
146	55	May 14, 2515	2:12:11	Annular	36N 149.4E	0.2976	0.9722	104	2m 57s	
146	56	May 25, 2533	9:15:50	Annular	42.6N 44.8E	0.366	0.9712	111	2m 56s	
146	57	June 5, 2551	16:10:40	Annular	49N 56.1W	0.4411	0.9699	121	2m 55s	
146	58	June 15, 2569	23:00:08	Annular	54.8N 153.7W	0.5197	0.968	135	2m 56s	
146	59	June 27, 2587	5:42:58	Annular	59.9N 113.1E	0.6029	0.9656	156	2m 58s	
146	60	July 8, 2605	12:23:21	Annular	64N 24E	0.6873	0.9626	186	3m 3s	
146	61	July 19, 2623	19:00:06	Annular	66.8N 60.2W	0.7738	0.9589	235	3m 10s	
146	62	July 29, 2641	1:35:56	Annular	68.1N 140W	0.8602	0.9545	326	3m 20s	
146	63	August 10, 2659	8:11:51	Annular	67.6N 146.8E	0.9454	0.9487	584	3m 30s	
146	64	August 20, 2677	14:50:18	Partial	61.7N 81.5E	1.0277	0.9182			
146	65	August 31, 2695	21:32:02	Partial	61.3N 27.3W	1.1064	0.7816			
146	66	September 12, 2713	4:18:12	Partial	61.1N 137.1W	1.1807	0.6536			
146	67	September 23, 2731	11:10:46	Partial	61N 111.6E	1.2491	0.5366			
146	68	October 3, 2749	18:09:52	Partial	61.1N 1.4W	1.3115	0.4305			
146	69	October 15, 2767	1:16:22	Partial	61.4N 116.2W	1.3673	0.3366			
146	70	October 25, 2785	8:31:14	Partial	61.8N 126.8E	1.4158	0.2555			
146	71	November 5, 2803	15:54:34	Partial	62.3N 7.6E	1.4572	0.1871			
146	72	November 15, 2821	23:26:43	Partial	63N 114W	1.4912	0.1314			
146	73	November 27, 2839	7:05:15	Partial	63.8N 122.6E	1.5198	0.0847			
146	74	December 7, 2857	14:52:22	Partial	64.8N 3.2W	1.5412	0.0502			
146	75	December 18, 2875	22:44:21	Partial	65.8N 130.6W	1.5581	0.023			
146	76	December 29, 2893	6:42:03	Partial	66.8N 100.1E	1.5706	0.0028			
