= Solar eclipse of March 17, 1923 =

20th-century annular solar eclipse

- Annular eclipse
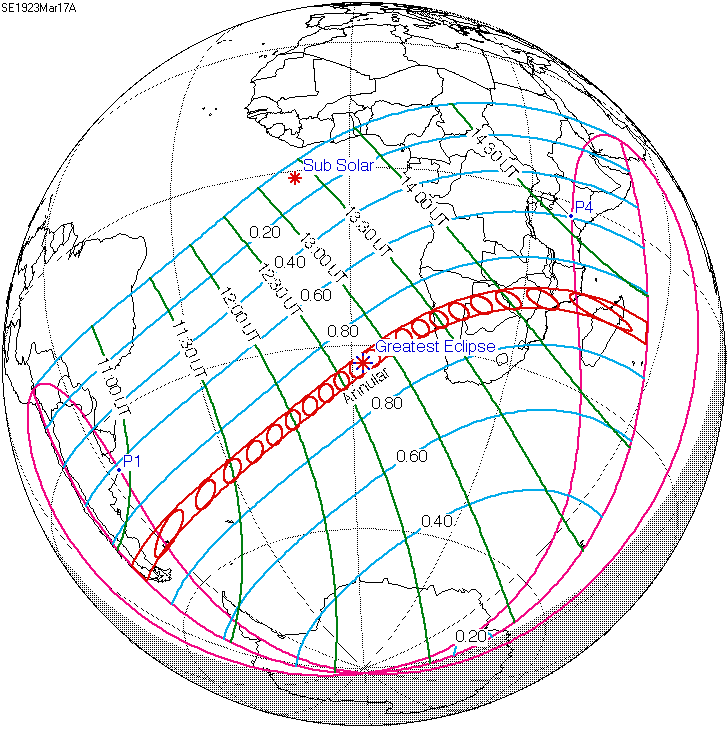
- Map
- Gamma: −0.5438
- Magnitude: 0.931

Maximum eclipse
- Duration: 471 s (7 min 51 s)
- Coordinates: 33°S 2.4°E
- Max. width of band: 305 km (190 mi)

Times (UTC)
- Greatest eclipse: 12:44:58

References
- Saros: 138 (26 of 70)
- Catalog # (SE5000): 9334

An annular solar eclipse occurred at the Moon's descending node of orbit on Saturday, March 17, 1923, with a magnitude of 0.931. A solar eclipse occurs when the Moon passes between Earth and the Sun, thereby totally or partly obscuring the image of the Sun for a viewer on Earth. An annular solar eclipse occurs when the Moon's apparent diameter is smaller than the Sun's, blocking most of the Sun's light and causing the Sun to look like an annulus (ring). An annular eclipse appears as a partial eclipse over a region of the Earth thousands of kilometres wide. Occurring about 1.7 days before apogee (on March 19, 1923, at 20:30 UTC), the Moon's apparent diameter was smaller.

Annularity was visible from Chile, Argentina, Falkland Islands including capital Stanley, Gough Island in Tristan da Cunha, South West Africa (today's Namibia), Bechuanaland Protectorate (today's Botswana, Southern Rhodesia (today's Zimbabwe) including capital Salisbury, Portuguese Mozambique (today's Mozambique), Nyasaland (today's Malawi), French Madagascar (the part now belonging to Madagascar, and the Islands of Juan de Nova and Tromelin). A partial eclipse was visible for parts of southern South America, Southern Africa, Central Africa, and Antarctica.

== Eclipse details ==
Shown below are two tables displaying details about this particular solar eclipse. The first table outlines times at which the Moon's penumbra or umbra attains the specific parameter, and the second table describes various other parameters pertaining to this eclipse.

March 17, 1923 Solar Eclipse Times
Event	Time (UTC)
First Penumbral External Contact	1923 March 17 at 09:50:46.8 UTC
First Umbral External Contact	1923 March 17 at 11:02:32.4 UTC
First Central Line	1923 March 17 at 11:05:55.6 UTC
First Umbral Internal Contact	1923 March 17 at 11:09:20.9 UTC
Equatorial Conjunction	1923 March 17 at 12:24:30.3 UTC
Greatest Duration	1923 March 17 at 12:44:57.5 UTC
Greatest Eclipse	1923 March 17 at 12:44:57.7 UTC
Ecliptic Conjunction	1923 March 17 at 12:51:27.3 UTC
Last Umbral Internal Contact	1923 March 17 at 14:20:49.0 UTC
Last Central Line	1923 March 17 at 14:24:15.1 UTC
Last Umbral External Contact	1923 March 17 at 14:27:39.2 UTC
Last Penumbral External Contact	1923 March 17 at 15:39:20.9 UTC

March 17, 1923 Solar Eclipse Parameters
Parameter	Value
Eclipse Magnitude	0.93100
Eclipse Obscuration	0.86676
Gamma	−0.54381
Sun Right Ascension	23h44m59.2s
Sun Declination	-01°37'34.5"
Sun Semi-Diameter	16'04.2"
Sun Equatorial Horizontal Parallax	08.8"
Moon Right Ascension	23h45m34.9s
Moon Declination	-02°05'35.9"
Moon Semi-Diameter	14'46.5"
Moon Equatorial Horizontal Parallax	0°54'13.4"
ΔT	23.1 s

== Eclipse season ==
This eclipse is part of an eclipse season, a period, roughly every six months, when eclipses occur. Only two (or occasionally three) eclipse seasons occur each year, and each season lasts about 35 days and repeats just short of six months (173 days) later; thus two full eclipse seasons always occur each year. Either two or three eclipses happen each eclipse season. In the sequence below, each eclipse is separated by a fortnight.

Eclipse season of March 1923
March 3 Ascending node (full moon)	March 17 Descending node (new moon)
Partial lunar eclipse Lunar Saros 112	Annular solar eclipse Solar Saros 138

== Related eclipses ==
=== Eclipses in 1923 ===
- A partial lunar eclipse on March 3.
- An annular solar eclipse on March 17.
- A partial lunar eclipse on August 26.
- A total solar eclipse on September 10.

=== Metonic ===
- Preceded by: Solar eclipse of May 29, 1919
- Followed by: Solar eclipse of January 3, 1927

=== Tzolkinex ===
- Preceded by: Solar eclipse of February 3, 1916
- Followed by: Solar eclipse of April 28, 1930

=== Half-Saros ===
- Preceded by: Lunar eclipse of March 12, 1914
- Followed by: Lunar eclipse of March 22, 1932

=== Tritos ===
- Preceded by: Solar eclipse of April 17, 1912
- Followed by: Solar eclipse of February 14, 1934

=== Solar Saros 138 ===
- Preceded by: Solar eclipse of March 6, 1905
- Followed by: Solar eclipse of March 27, 1941

=== Inex ===
- Preceded by: Solar eclipse of April 6, 1894
- Followed by: Solar eclipse of February 25, 1952

=== Triad ===
- Preceded by: Solar eclipse of May 15, 1836
- Followed by: Solar eclipse of January 15, 2010

=== Solar eclipses of 1921–1924 ===
This eclipse is a member of a semester series. An eclipse in a semester series of solar eclipses repeats approximately every 177 days and 4 hours (a semester) at alternating nodes of the Moon's orbit.

The partial solar eclipse on July 31, 1924 occurs in the next lunar year eclipse set.

Solar eclipse series sets from 1921 to 1924
Descending node			Ascending node		
Saros	Map	Gamma	Saros	Map	Gamma
118	April 8, 1921 Annular	0.8869	123	October 1, 1921 Total	−0.9383
128	March 28, 1922 Annular	0.1711	133	September 21, 1922 Total	−0.213
138	March 17, 1923 Annular	−0.5438	143	September 10, 1923 Total	0.5149
148	March 5, 1924 Partial	−1.2232	153	August 30, 1924 Partial	1.3123

=== Saros 138 ===
This eclipse is a part of Saros series 138, repeating every 18 years, 11 days, and containing 70 events. The series started with a partial solar eclipse on June 6, 1472. It contains annular eclipses from August 31, 1598 through February 18, 2482; a hybrid eclipse on March 1, 2500; and total eclipses from March 12, 2518 through April 3, 2554. The series ends at member 70 as a partial eclipse on July 11, 2716. Its eclipses are tabulated in three columns; every third eclipse in the same column is one exeligmos apart, so they all cast shadows over approximately the same parts of the Earth.

The longest duration of annularity was produced by member 23 at 8 minutes, 2 seconds on February 11, 1869, and the longest duration of totality will be produced by member 61 at 56 seconds on April 3, 2554. All eclipses in this series occur at the Moon’s descending node of orbit.

Series members 20–41 occur between 1801 and 2200:
20	21	22
January 10, 1815	January 20, 1833	February 1, 1851
23	24	25
February 11, 1869	February 22, 1887	March 6, 1905
26	27	28
March 17, 1923	March 27, 1941	April 8, 1959
29	30	31
April 18, 1977	April 29, 1995	May 10, 2013
32	33	34
May 21, 2031	May 31, 2049	June 11, 2067
35	36	37
June 22, 2085	July 4, 2103	July 14, 2121
38	39	40
July 25, 2139	August 5, 2157	August 16, 2175
41
August 26, 2193

=== Metonic series ===
The metonic series repeats eclipses every 19 years (6939.69 days), lasting about 5 cycles. Eclipses occur in nearly the same calendar date. In addition, the octon subseries repeats 1/5 of that or every 3.8 years (1387.94 days). All eclipses in this table occur at the Moon's descending node.

22 eclipse events between March 16, 1866 and August 9, 1953
March 16–17	January 1–3	October 20–22	August 9–10	May 27–29
108	110	112	114	116
March 16, 1866			August 9, 1877	May 27, 1881
118	120	122	124	126
March 16, 1885	January 1, 1889	October 20, 1892	August 9, 1896	May 28, 1900
128	130	132	134	136
March 17, 1904	January 3, 1908	October 22, 1911	August 10, 1915	May 29, 1919
138	140	142	144	146
March 17, 1923	January 3, 1927	October 21, 1930	August 10, 1934	May 29, 1938
148	150	152	154	
March 16, 1942	January 3, 1946	October 21, 1949	August 9, 1953	

=== Tritos series ===
This eclipse is a part of a tritos cycle, repeating at alternating nodes every 135 synodic months (≈ 3986.63 days, or 11 years minus 1 month). Their appearance and longitude are irregular due to a lack of synchronization with the anomalistic month (period of perigee), but groupings of 3 tritos cycles (≈ 33 years minus 3 months) come close (≈ 434.044 anomalistic months), so eclipses are similar in these groupings.

Series members between 1801 and 2200
February 21, 1803 (Saros 127)	January 21, 1814 (Saros 128)	December 20, 1824 (Saros 129)	November 20, 1835 (Saros 130)	October 20, 1846 (Saros 131)
September 18, 1857 (Saros 132)	August 18, 1868 (Saros 133)	July 19, 1879 (Saros 134)	June 17, 1890 (Saros 135)	May 18, 1901 (Saros 136)
April 17, 1912 (Saros 137)	March 17, 1923 (Saros 138)	February 14, 1934 (Saros 139)	January 14, 1945 (Saros 140)	December 14, 1955 (Saros 141)
November 12, 1966 (Saros 142)	October 12, 1977 (Saros 143)	September 11, 1988 (Saros 144)	August 11, 1999 (Saros 145)	July 11, 2010 (Saros 146)
June 10, 2021 (Saros 147)	May 9, 2032 (Saros 148)	April 9, 2043 (Saros 149)	March 9, 2054 (Saros 150)	February 5, 2065 (Saros 151)
January 6, 2076 (Saros 152)	December 6, 2086 (Saros 153)	November 4, 2097 (Saros 154)	October 5, 2108 (Saros 155)	September 5, 2119 (Saros 156)
August 4, 2130 (Saros 157)	July 3, 2141 (Saros 158)	June 3, 2152 (Saros 159)		April 1, 2174 (Saros 161)

=== Inex series ===
This eclipse is a part of the long period inex cycle, repeating at alternating nodes, every 358 synodic months (≈ 10,571.95 days, or 29 years minus 20 days). Their appearance and longitude are irregular due to a lack of synchronization with the anomalistic month (period of perigee). However, groupings of 3 inex cycles (≈ 87 years minus 2 months) comes close (≈ 1,151.02 anomalistic months), so eclipses are similar in these groupings.

Series members between 1801 and 2200
June 6, 1807 (Saros 134)	May 15, 1836 (Saros 135)	April 25, 1865 (Saros 136)
April 6, 1894 (Saros 137)	March 17, 1923 (Saros 138)	February 25, 1952 (Saros 139)
February 4, 1981 (Saros 140)	January 15, 2010 (Saros 141)	December 26, 2038 (Saros 142)
December 6, 2067 (Saros 143)	November 15, 2096 (Saros 144)	October 26, 2125 (Saros 145)
October 7, 2154 (Saros 146)	September 16, 2183 (Saros 147)	
