= Solar eclipse of April 18, 1931 =

20th-century partial solar eclipse

- Partial eclipse
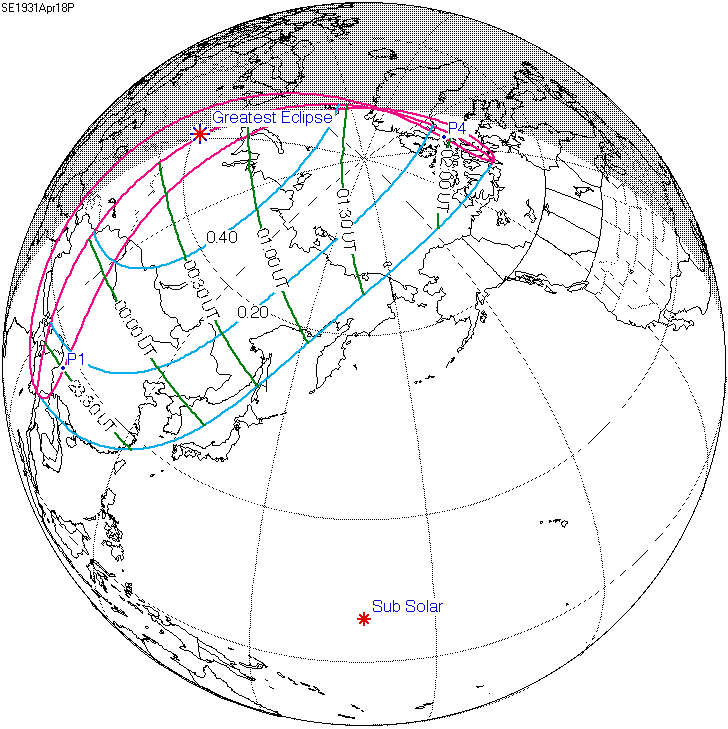
- Map
- Gamma: 1.2643
- Magnitude: 0.5107

Maximum eclipse
- Coordinates: 61.5°N 58.9°E

Times (UTC)
- Greatest eclipse: 0:45:35

References
- Saros: 147 (18 of 80)
- Catalog # (SE5000): 9353

A partial solar eclipse occurred at the Moon's ascending node of orbit between Friday, April 17 and Saturday, April 18, 1931, with a magnitude of 0.5107. A solar eclipse occurs when the Moon passes between Earth and the Sun, thereby totally or partly obscuring the image of the Sun for a viewer on Earth. A partial solar eclipse occurs in the polar regions of the Earth when the center of the Moon's shadow misses the Earth.

A partial eclipse was visible for parts of East Asia and North Asia.

== Eclipse details ==
Shown below are two tables displaying details about this particular solar eclipse. The first table outlines times at which the Moon's penumbra or umbra attains the specific parameter, and the second table describes various other parameters pertaining to this eclipse.

April 18, 1931 Solar Eclipse Times
Event	Time (UTC)
First Penumbral External Contact	1931 April 17 at 22:57:48.0 UTC
Greatest Eclipse	1931 April 18 at 00:45:34.6 UTC
Ecliptic Conjunction	1931 April 18 at 00:59:58.6 UTC
Equatorial Conjunction	1931 April 18 at 01:59:51.2 UTC
Last Penumbral External Contact	1931 April 18 at 02:32:47.7 UTC

April 18, 1931 Solar Eclipse Parameters
Parameter	Value
Eclipse Magnitude	0.51068
Eclipse Obscuration	0.39455
Gamma	1.26430
Sun Right Ascension	01h40m20.1s
Sun Declination	+10°25'14.0"
Sun Semi-Diameter	15'55.6"
Sun Equatorial Horizontal Parallax	08.8"
Moon Right Ascension	01h38m13.6s
Moon Declination	+11°26'51.3"
Moon Semi-Diameter	14'54.6"
Moon Equatorial Horizontal Parallax	0°54'43.2"
ΔT	24.0 s

== Eclipse season ==
This eclipse is part of an eclipse season, a period, roughly every six months, when eclipses occur. Only two (or occasionally three) eclipse seasons occur each year, and each season lasts about 35 days and repeats just short of six months (173 days) later; thus two full eclipse seasons always occur each year. Either two or three eclipses happen each eclipse season. In the sequence below, each eclipse is separated by a fortnight.

Eclipse season of April 1931
April 2 Descending node (full moon)	April 18 Ascending node (new moon)
Total lunar eclipse Lunar Saros 121	Partial solar eclipse Solar Saros 147

== Related eclipses ==
=== Eclipses in 1931 ===
- A total lunar eclipse on April 2.
- A partial solar eclipse on April 18.
- A partial solar eclipse on September 12.
- A total lunar eclipse on September 26.
- A partial solar eclipse on October 11.

=== Metonic ===
- Preceded by: Solar eclipse of June 29, 1927
- Followed by: Solar eclipse of February 3, 1935

=== Tzolkinex ===
- Preceded by: Solar eclipse of March 5, 1924
- Followed by: Solar eclipse of May 29, 1938

=== Half-Saros ===
- Preceded by: Lunar eclipse of April 11, 1922
- Followed by: Lunar eclipse of April 22, 1940

=== Tritos ===
- Preceded by: Solar eclipse of May 18, 1920
- Followed by: Solar eclipse of March 16, 1942

=== Solar Saros 147 ===
- Preceded by: Solar eclipse of April 6, 1913
- Followed by: Solar eclipse of April 28, 1949

=== Inex ===
- Preceded by: Solar eclipse of May 7, 1902
- Followed by: Solar eclipse of March 27, 1960

=== Triad ===
- Preceded by: Solar eclipse of June 16, 1844
- Followed by: Solar eclipse of February 15, 2018

=== Solar eclipses of 1928–1931 ===
This eclipse is a member of a semester series. An eclipse in a semester series of solar eclipses repeats approximately every 177 days and 4 hours (a semester) at alternating nodes of the Moon's orbit.

The partial solar eclipse on June 17, 1928 occurs in the previous lunar year eclipse set, and the partial solar eclipse on September 12, 1931 occurs in the next lunar year eclipse set.

Solar eclipse series sets from 1928 to 1931
Ascending node			Descending node		
Saros	Map	Gamma	Saros	Map	Gamma
117	May 19, 1928 Total (non-central)	1.0048	122	November 12, 1928 Partial	1.0861
127	May 9, 1929 Total	−0.2887	132	November 1, 1929 Annular	0.3514
137	April 28, 1930 Hybrid	0.473	142	October 21, 1930 Total	−0.3804
147	April 18, 1931 Partial	1.2643	152	October 11, 1931 Partial	−1.0607

=== Saros 147 ===
This eclipse is a part of Saros series 147, repeating every 18 years, 11 days, and containing 80 events. The series started with a partial solar eclipse on October 12, 1624. It contains annular eclipses from May 31, 2003 through July 31, 2706. There are no hybrid or total eclipses in this set. The series ends at member 80 as a partial eclipse on February 24, 3049. Its eclipses are tabulated in three columns; every third eclipse in the same column is one exeligmos apart, so they all cast shadows over approximately the same parts of the Earth.

The longest duration of annularity will be produced by member 38 at 9 minutes, 41 seconds on November 21, 2291. All eclipses in this series occur at the Moon’s ascending node of orbit.

Series members 11–32 occur between 1801 and 2200:
11	12	13
January 30, 1805	February 11, 1823	February 21, 1841
14	15	16
March 4, 1859	March 15, 1877	March 26, 1895
17	18	19
April 6, 1913	April 18, 1931	April 28, 1949
20	21	22
May 9, 1967	May 19, 1985	May 31, 2003
23	24	25
June 10, 2021	June 21, 2039	July 1, 2057
26	27	28
July 13, 2075	July 23, 2093	August 4, 2111
29	30	31
August 15, 2129	August 26, 2147	September 5, 2165
32
September 16, 2183

=== Metonic series ===
The metonic series repeats eclipses every 19 years (6939.69 days), lasting about 5 cycles. Eclipses occur in nearly the same calendar date. In addition, the octon subseries repeats 1/5 of that or every 3.8 years (1387.94 days). All eclipses in this table occur at the Moon's ascending node.

23 eclipse events between February 3, 1859 and June 29, 1946
February 1–3	November 21–22	September 8–10	June 28–29	April 16–18
109	111	113	115	117
February 3, 1859	November 21, 1862		June 28, 1870	April 16, 1874
119	121	123	125	127
February 2, 1878	November 21, 1881	September 8, 1885	June 28, 1889	April 16, 1893
129	131	133	135	137
February 1, 1897	November 22, 1900	September 9, 1904	June 28, 1908	April 17, 1912
139	141	143	145	147
February 3, 1916	November 22, 1919	September 10, 1923	June 29, 1927	April 18, 1931
149	151	153	155	
February 3, 1935	November 21, 1938	September 10, 1942	June 29, 1946	

=== Tritos series ===
This eclipse is a part of a tritos cycle, repeating at alternating nodes every 135 synodic months (≈ 3986.63 days, or 11 years minus 1 month). Their appearance and longitude are irregular due to a lack of synchronization with the anomalistic month (period of perigee), but groupings of 3 tritos cycles (≈ 33 years minus 3 months) come close (≈ 434.044 anomalistic months), so eclipses are similar in these groupings.

The partial solar eclipse on November 4, 2116 (part of Saros 164) is also a part of this series but is not included in the table below.

Series members between 1801 and 2029
March 24, 1811 (Saros 136)	February 21, 1822 (Saros 137)	January 20, 1833 (Saros 138)	December 21, 1843 (Saros 139)	November 20, 1854 (Saros 140)
October 19, 1865 (Saros 141)	September 17, 1876 (Saros 142)	August 19, 1887 (Saros 143)	July 18, 1898 (Saros 144)	June 17, 1909 (Saros 145)
May 18, 1920 (Saros 146)	April 18, 1931 (Saros 147)	March 16, 1942 (Saros 148)	February 14, 1953 (Saros 149)	January 14, 1964 (Saros 150)
December 13, 1974 (Saros 151)	November 12, 1985 (Saros 152)	October 12, 1996 (Saros 153)	September 11, 2007 (Saros 154)	August 11, 2018 (Saros 155)
July 11, 2029 (Saros 156)

=== Inex series ===
This eclipse is a part of the long period inex cycle, repeating at alternating nodes, every 358 synodic months (≈ 10,571.95 days, or 29 years minus 20 days). Their appearance and longitude are irregular due to a lack of synchronization with the anomalistic month (period of perigee). However, groupings of 3 inex cycles (≈ 87 years minus 2 months) comes close (≈ 1,151.02 anomalistic months), so eclipses are similar in these groupings.

Series members between 1801 and 2200
July 6, 1815 (Saros 143)	June 16, 1844 (Saros 144)	May 26, 1873 (Saros 145)
May 7, 1902 (Saros 146)	April 18, 1931 (Saros 147)	March 27, 1960 (Saros 148)
March 7, 1989 (Saros 149)	February 15, 2018 (Saros 150)	January 26, 2047 (Saros 151)
January 6, 2076 (Saros 152)	December 17, 2104 (Saros 153)	November 26, 2133 (Saros 154)
November 7, 2162 (Saros 155)	October 18, 2191 (Saros 156)	
