= Solar eclipse of April 28, 1949 =

20th-century partial solar eclipse

- Partial eclipse
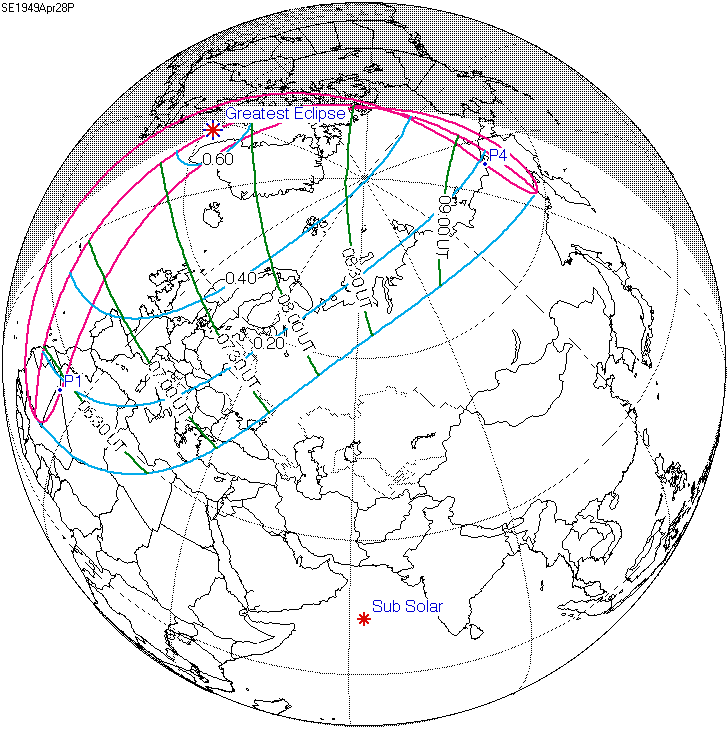
- Map
- Gamma: 1.2068
- Magnitude: 0.6092

Maximum eclipse
- Coordinates: 61.9°N 55.7°W

Times (UTC)
- Greatest eclipse: 7:48:53

References
- Saros: 147 (19 of 80)
- Catalog # (SE5000): 9396

A partial solar eclipse occurred at the Moon's ascending node of orbit on Thursday, April 28, 1949, with a magnitude of 0.6092. A solar eclipse occurs when the Moon passes between Earth and the Sun, thereby totally or partly obscuring the image of the Sun for a viewer on Earth. A partial solar eclipse occurs in the polar regions of the Earth when the center of the Moon's shadow misses the Earth.

A partial eclipse was visible for parts of North Africa, Europe, the Soviet Union, Greenland, and northern Canada.

== Eclipse details ==
Shown below are two tables displaying details about this particular solar eclipse. The first table outlines times at which the Moon's penumbra or umbra attains the specific parameter, and the second table describes various other parameters pertaining to this eclipse.

April 28, 1949 Solar Eclipse Times
Event	Time (UTC)
First Penumbral External Contact	1949 April 28 at 05:52:15.3 UTC
Greatest Eclipse	1949 April 28 at 07:48:53.1 UTC
Ecliptic Conjunction	1949 April 28 at 08:02:42.0 UTC
Equatorial Conjunction	1949 April 28 at 08:53:20.8 UTC
Last Penumbral External Contact	1949 April 28 at 09:45:01.2 UTC

April 28, 1949 Solar Eclipse Parameters
Parameter	Value
Eclipse Magnitude	0.60918
Eclipse Obscuration	0.50435
Gamma	1.20682
Sun Right Ascension	02h21m19.3s
Sun Declination	+14°04'51.6"
Sun Semi-Diameter	15'52.9"
Sun Equatorial Horizontal Parallax	08.7"
Moon Right Ascension	02h19m26.3s
Moon Declination	+15°04'38.0"
Moon Semi-Diameter	14'52.8"
Moon Equatorial Horizontal Parallax	0°54'36.6"
ΔT	28.9 s

== Eclipse season ==
This eclipse is part of an eclipse season, a period, roughly every six months, when eclipses occur. Only two (or occasionally three) eclipse seasons occur each year, and each season lasts about 35 days and repeats just short of six months (173 days) later; thus two full eclipse seasons always occur each year. Either two or three eclipses happen each eclipse season. In the sequence below, each eclipse is separated by a fortnight.

Eclipse season of April 1949
April 13 Descending node (full moon)	April 28 Ascending node (new moon)
Total lunar eclipse Lunar Saros 121	Partial solar eclipse Solar Saros 147

== Related eclipses ==
=== Eclipses in 1949 ===
- A total lunar eclipse on April 13.
- A partial solar eclipse on April 28.
- A total lunar eclipse on October 7.
- A partial solar eclipse on October 21.

=== Metonic ===
- Preceded by: Solar eclipse of July 9, 1945
- Followed by: Solar eclipse of February 14, 1953

=== Tzolkinex ===
- Preceded by: Solar eclipse of March 16, 1942
- Followed by: Solar eclipse of June 8, 1956

=== Half-Saros ===
- Preceded by: Lunar eclipse of April 22, 1940
- Followed by: Lunar eclipse of May 3, 1958

=== Tritos ===
- Preceded by: Solar eclipse of May 29, 1938
- Followed by: Solar eclipse of March 27, 1960

=== Solar Saros 147 ===
- Preceded by: Solar eclipse of April 18, 1931
- Followed by: Solar eclipse of May 9, 1967

=== Inex ===
- Preceded by: Solar eclipse of May 18, 1920
- Followed by: Solar eclipse of April 7, 1978

=== Triad ===
- Preceded by: Solar eclipse of June 27, 1862
- Followed by: Solar eclipse of February 27, 2036

=== Solar eclipses of 1946–1949 ===
This eclipse is a member of a semester series. An eclipse in a semester series of solar eclipses repeats approximately every 177 days and 4 hours (a semester) at alternating nodes of the Moon's orbit.

The partial solar eclipses on January 3, 1946 and June 29, 1946 occur in the previous lunar year eclipse set.

Solar eclipse series sets from 1946 to 1949
Ascending node			Descending node		
Saros	Map	Gamma	Saros	Map	Gamma
117	May 30, 1946 Partial	−1.0711	122	November 23, 1946 Partial	1.105
127	May 20, 1947 Total	−0.3528	132	November 12, 1947 Annular	0.3743
137	May 9, 1948 Annular	0.4133	142	November 1, 1948 Total	−0.3517
147	April 28, 1949 Partial	1.2068	152	October 21, 1949 Partial	−1.027

=== Saros 147 ===
This eclipse is a part of Saros series 147, repeating every 18 years, 11 days, and containing 80 events. The series started with a partial solar eclipse on October 12, 1624. It contains annular eclipses from May 31, 2003 through July 31, 2706. There are no hybrid or total eclipses in this set. The series ends at member 80 as a partial eclipse on February 24, 3049. Its eclipses are tabulated in three columns; every third eclipse in the same column is one exeligmos apart, so they all cast shadows over approximately the same parts of the Earth.

The longest duration of annularity will be produced by member 38 at 9 minutes, 41 seconds on November 21, 2291. All eclipses in this series occur at the Moon’s ascending node of orbit.

Series members 11–32 occur between 1801 and 2200:
11	12	13
January 30, 1805	February 11, 1823	February 21, 1841
14	15	16
March 4, 1859	March 15, 1877	March 26, 1895
17	18	19
April 6, 1913	April 18, 1931	April 28, 1949
20	21	22
May 9, 1967	May 19, 1985	May 31, 2003
23	24	25
June 10, 2021	June 21, 2039	July 1, 2057
26	27	28
July 13, 2075	July 23, 2093	August 4, 2111
29	30	31
August 15, 2129	August 26, 2147	September 5, 2165
32
September 16, 2183

=== Metonic series ===
The metonic series repeats eclipses every 19 years (6939.69 days), lasting about 5 cycles. Eclipses occur in nearly the same calendar date. In addition, the octon subseries repeats 1/5 of that or every 3.8 years (1387.94 days). All eclipses in this table occur at the Moon's ascending node.

22 eclipse events between December 2, 1880 and July 9, 1964
December 2–3	September 20–21	July 9–10	April 26–28	February 13–14
111	113	115	117	119
December 2, 1880		July 9, 1888	April 26, 1892	February 13, 1896
121	123	125	127	129
December 3, 1899	September 21, 1903	July 10, 1907	April 28, 1911	February 14, 1915
131	133	135	137	139
December 3, 1918	September 21, 1922	July 9, 1926	April 28, 1930	February 14, 1934
141	143	145	147	149
December 2, 1937	September 21, 1941	July 9, 1945	April 28, 1949	February 14, 1953
151	153	155		
December 2, 1956	September 20, 1960	July 9, 1964		

=== Tritos series ===
This eclipse is a part of a tritos cycle, repeating at alternating nodes every 135 synodic months (≈ 3986.63 days, or 11 years minus 1 month). Their appearance and longitude are irregular due to a lack of synchronization with the anomalistic month (period of perigee), but groupings of 3 tritos cycles (≈ 33 years minus 3 months) come close (≈ 434.044 anomalistic months), so eclipses are similar in these groupings.

The partial solar eclipses on November 16, 2134 (part of Saros 164) and October 16, 2145 (part of Saros 165) are also a part of this series but are not included in the table below.

Series members between 1801 and 2069
June 6, 1807 (Saros 134)	May 5, 1818 (Saros 135)	April 3, 1829 (Saros 136)	March 4, 1840 (Saros 137)	February 1, 1851 (Saros 138)
December 31, 1861 (Saros 139)	November 30, 1872 (Saros 140)	October 30, 1883 (Saros 141)	September 29, 1894 (Saros 142)	August 30, 1905 (Saros 143)
July 30, 1916 (Saros 144)	June 29, 1927 (Saros 145)	May 29, 1938 (Saros 146)	April 28, 1949 (Saros 147)	March 27, 1960 (Saros 148)
February 25, 1971 (Saros 149)	January 25, 1982 (Saros 150)	December 24, 1992 (Saros 151)	November 23, 2003 (Saros 152)	October 23, 2014 (Saros 153)
September 21, 2025 (Saros 154)	August 21, 2036 (Saros 155)	July 22, 2047 (Saros 156)	June 21, 2058 (Saros 157)	May 20, 2069 (Saros 158)

=== Inex series ===
This eclipse is a part of the long period inex cycle, repeating at alternating nodes, every 358 synodic months (≈ 10,571.95 days, or 29 years minus 20 days). Their appearance and longitude are irregular due to a lack of synchronization with the anomalistic month (period of perigee). However, groupings of 3 inex cycles (≈ 87 years minus 2 months) comes close (≈ 1,151.02 anomalistic months), so eclipses are similar in these groupings.

Series members between 1801 and 2200
August 5, 1804 (Saros 142)	July 17, 1833 (Saros 143)	June 27, 1862 (Saros 144)
June 6, 1891 (Saros 145)	May 18, 1920 (Saros 146)	April 28, 1949 (Saros 147)
April 7, 1978 (Saros 148)	March 19, 2007 (Saros 149)	February 27, 2036 (Saros 150)
February 5, 2065 (Saros 151)	January 16, 2094 (Saros 152)	December 28, 2122 (Saros 153)
December 8, 2151 (Saros 154)	November 17, 2180 (Saros 155)	
