= Solar eclipse of June 17, 1909 =

Hybrid eclipse

- Hybrid eclipse
- Map
- Gamma: 0.8957
- Magnitude: 1.0065

Maximum eclipse
- Duration: 24 s (0 min 24 s)
- Coordinates: 82.9°N 123.6°E
- Max. width of band: 51 km (32 mi)

Times (UTC)
- Greatest eclipse: 23:18:38

References
- Saros: 145 (16 of 77)
- Catalog # (SE5000): 9302

A total solar eclipse occurred at the Moon's ascending node of orbit between Thursday, June 17 and Friday, June 18, 1909, with a magnitude of 1.0065. It was a hybrid event, with a long section of its path as total, and smaller sections at the start and end as an annular eclipse. A solar eclipse occurs when the Moon passes between Earth and the Sun, thereby totally or partly obscuring the image of the Sun for a viewer on Earth. A hybrid solar eclipse is a rare type of solar eclipse that changes its appearance from annular to total and back as the Moon's shadow moves across the Earth's surface. Totality occurs between the annularity paths across the surface of the Earth, with the partial solar eclipse visible over a surrounding region thousands of kilometres wide. The Moon's apparent diameter was near the average diameter because it occurred 5.4 days after perigee (on June 12, 1909, at 16:00 UTC) and 7.5 days before apogee (on June 25, 1909, at 12:00 UTC).

The path of totality crossed central Russia, the Arctic Ocean, northeastern Ellesmere Island in Canada, Greenland, and annularity crossed southern Siberia in Russia (now in northeastern Kazakhstan and southern Russia) and southern Greenland. A partial eclipse was visible for parts of East Asia and northern North America.

== Eclipse details ==
Shown below are two tables displaying details about this particular solar eclipse. The first table outlines times at which the Moon's penumbra or umbra attains the specific parameter, and the second table describes various other parameters pertaining to this eclipse.

June 17, 1909 Solar Eclipse Times
Event	Time (UTC)
First Penumbral External Contact	1909 June 17 at 21:00:24.0 UTC
First Umbral External Contact	1909 June 17 at 22:30:16.6 UTC
First Central Line	1909 June 17 at 22:30:18.7 UTC
First Umbral Internal Contact	1909 June 17 at 22:30:20.9 UTC
Greatest Duration	1909 June 17 at 23:16:41.2 UTC
Greatest Eclipse	1909 June 17 at 23:18:38.1 UTC
Ecliptic Conjunction	1909 June 17 at 23:28:20.1 UTC
Equatorial Conjunction	1909 June 17 at 23:31:17.2 UTC
Last Umbral Internal Contact	1909 June 18 at 00:06:44.2 UTC
Last Central Line	1909 June 18 at 00:06:49.2 UTC
Last Umbral External Contact	1909 June 18 at 00:06:54.2 UTC
Last Penumbral External Contact	1909 June 18 at 01:36:52.5 UTC

June 17, 1909 Solar Eclipse Parameters
Parameter	Value
Eclipse Magnitude	1.00647
Eclipse Obscuration	1.01299
Gamma	0.89568
Sun Right Ascension	05h42m52.5s
Sun Declination	+23°23'35.6"
Sun Semi-Diameter	15'44.3"
Sun Equatorial Horizontal Parallax	08.7"
Moon Right Ascension	05h42m23.6s
Moon Declination	+24°14'45.8"
Moon Semi-Diameter	15'44.1"
Moon Equatorial Horizontal Parallax	0°57'44.9"
ΔT	9.7 s

== Eclipse season ==
This eclipse is part of an eclipse season, a period, roughly every six months, when eclipses occur. Only two (or occasionally three) eclipse seasons occur each year, and each season lasts about 35 days and repeats just short of six months (173 days) later; thus two full eclipse seasons always occur each year. Either two or three eclipses happen each eclipse season. In the sequence below, each eclipse is separated by a fortnight.

Eclipse season of June 1909
June 4 Descending node (full moon)	June 17 Ascending node (new moon)
Total lunar eclipse Lunar Saros 119	Hybrid solar eclipse Solar Saros 145

== Related eclipses ==
=== Eclipses in 1909 ===
- A total lunar eclipse on June 4.
- A hybrid solar eclipse on June 17.
- A total lunar eclipse on November 27.
- A partial solar eclipse on December 12.

=== Metonic ===
- Preceded by: Solar eclipse of August 30, 1905
- Followed by: Solar eclipse of April 6, 1913

=== Tzolkinex ===
- Preceded by: Solar eclipse of May 7, 1902
- Followed by: Solar eclipse of July 30, 1916

=== Half-Saros ===
- Preceded by: Lunar eclipse of June 13, 1900
- Followed by: Lunar eclipse of June 24, 1918

=== Tritos ===
- Preceded by: Solar eclipse of July 18, 1898
- Followed by: Solar eclipse of May 18, 1920

=== Solar Saros 145 ===
- Preceded by: Solar eclipse of June 6, 1891
- Followed by: Solar eclipse of June 29, 1927

=== Inex ===
- Preceded by: Solar eclipse of July 7, 1880
- Followed by: Solar eclipse of May 29, 1938

=== Triad ===
- Preceded by: Solar eclipse of August 16, 1822
- Followed by: Solar eclipse of April 17, 1996

=== Solar eclipses of 1906–1909 ===
This eclipse is a member of a semester series. An eclipse in a semester series of solar eclipses repeats approximately every 177 days and 4 hours (a semester) at alternating nodes of the Moon's orbit.

The partial solar eclipses on February 23, 1906 and August 20, 1906 occur in the previous lunar year eclipse set.

Solar eclipse series sets from 1906 to 1909
Ascending node			Descending node		
Saros	Map	Gamma	Saros	Map	Gamma
115	July 21, 1906 Partial	−1.3637	120	January 14, 1907 Total	0.8628
125	July 10, 1907 Annular	−0.6313	130	January 3, 1908 Total	0.1934
135	June 28, 1908 Annular	0.1389	140	December 23, 1908 Hybrid	−0.4985
145	June 17, 1909 Hybrid	0.8957	150	December 12, 1909 Partial	−1.2456

=== Saros 145 ===
This eclipse is a part of Saros series 145, repeating every 18 years, 11 days, and containing 77 events. The series started with a partial solar eclipse on January 4, 1639. It contains an annular eclipse on June 6, 1891; a hybrid eclipse on June 17, 1909; and total eclipses from June 29, 1927 through September 9, 2648. The series ends at member 77 as a partial eclipse on April 17, 3009. Its eclipses are tabulated in three columns; every third eclipse in the same column is one exeligmos apart, so they all cast shadows over approximately the same parts of the Earth.

The longest duration of annularity was produced by member 15 at 6 seconds (by default) on June 6, 1891, and the longest duration of totality will be produced by member 50 at 7 minutes, 12 seconds on June 25, 2522. All eclipses in this series occur at the Moon’s ascending node of orbit.

Series members 10–32 occur between 1801 and 2200:
10	11	12
April 13, 1801	April 24, 1819	May 4, 1837
13	14	15
May 16, 1855	May 26, 1873	June 6, 1891
16	17	18
June 17, 1909	June 29, 1927	July 9, 1945
19	20	21
July 20, 1963	July 31, 1981	August 11, 1999
22	23	24
August 21, 2017	September 2, 2035	September 12, 2053
25	26	27
September 23, 2071	October 4, 2089	October 16, 2107
28	29	30
October 26, 2125	November 7, 2143	November 17, 2161
31	32	
November 28, 2179	December 9, 2197	

=== Metonic series ===
The metonic series repeats eclipses every 19 years (6939.69 days), lasting about 5 cycles. Eclipses occur in nearly the same calendar date. In addition, the octon subseries repeats 1/5 of that or every 3.8 years (1387.94 days). All eclipses in this table occur at the Moon's ascending node.

25 eclipse events between April 5, 1837 and June 17, 1928
April 5–6	January 22–23	November 10–11	August 28–30	June 17–18
107	109	111	113	115
April 5, 1837	January 22, 1841	November 10, 1844	August 28, 1848	June 17, 1852
117	119	121	123	125
April 5, 1856	January 23, 1860	November 11, 1863	August 29, 1867	June 18, 1871
127	129	131	133	135
April 6, 1875	January 22, 1879	November 10, 1882	August 29, 1886	June 17, 1890
137	139	141	143	145
April 6, 1894	January 22, 1898	November 11, 1901	August 30, 1905	June 17, 1909
147	149	151	153	155
April 6, 1913	January 23, 1917	November 10, 1920	August 30, 1924	June 17, 1928

=== Tritos series ===
This eclipse is a part of a tritos cycle, repeating at alternating nodes every 135 synodic months (≈ 3986.63 days, or 11 years minus 1 month). Their appearance and longitude are irregular due to a lack of synchronization with the anomalistic month (period of perigee), but groupings of 3 tritos cycles (≈ 33 years minus 3 months) come close (≈ 434.044 anomalistic months), so eclipses are similar in these groupings.

The partial solar eclipse on November 4, 2116 (part of Saros 164) is also a part of this series but is not included in the table below.

Series members between 1801 and 2029
March 24, 1811 (Saros 136)	February 21, 1822 (Saros 137)	January 20, 1833 (Saros 138)	December 21, 1843 (Saros 139)	November 20, 1854 (Saros 140)
October 19, 1865 (Saros 141)	September 17, 1876 (Saros 142)	August 19, 1887 (Saros 143)	July 18, 1898 (Saros 144)	June 17, 1909 (Saros 145)
May 18, 1920 (Saros 146)	April 18, 1931 (Saros 147)	March 16, 1942 (Saros 148)	February 14, 1953 (Saros 149)	January 14, 1964 (Saros 150)
December 13, 1974 (Saros 151)	November 12, 1985 (Saros 152)	October 12, 1996 (Saros 153)	September 11, 2007 (Saros 154)	August 11, 2018 (Saros 155)
July 11, 2029 (Saros 156)

=== Inex series ===
This eclipse is a part of the long period inex cycle, repeating at alternating nodes, every 358 synodic months (≈ 10,571.95 days, or 29 years minus 20 days). Their appearance and longitude are irregular due to a lack of synchronization with the anomalistic month (period of perigee). However, groupings of 3 inex cycles (≈ 87 years minus 2 months) comes close (≈ 1,151.02 anomalistic months), so eclipses are similar in these groupings.

Series members between 1801 and 2200
August 16, 1822 (Saros 142)	July 28, 1851 (Saros 143)	July 7, 1880 (Saros 144)
June 17, 1909 (Saros 145)	May 29, 1938 (Saros 146)	May 9, 1967 (Saros 147)
April 17, 1996 (Saros 148)	March 29, 2025 (Saros 149)	March 9, 2054 (Saros 150)
February 16, 2083 (Saros 151)	January 29, 2112 (Saros 152)	January 8, 2141 (Saros 153)
December 18, 2169 (Saros 154)	November 28, 2198 (Saros 155)	
