= Solar eclipse of May 18, 1920 =

20th-century partial solar eclipse

- Partial eclipse
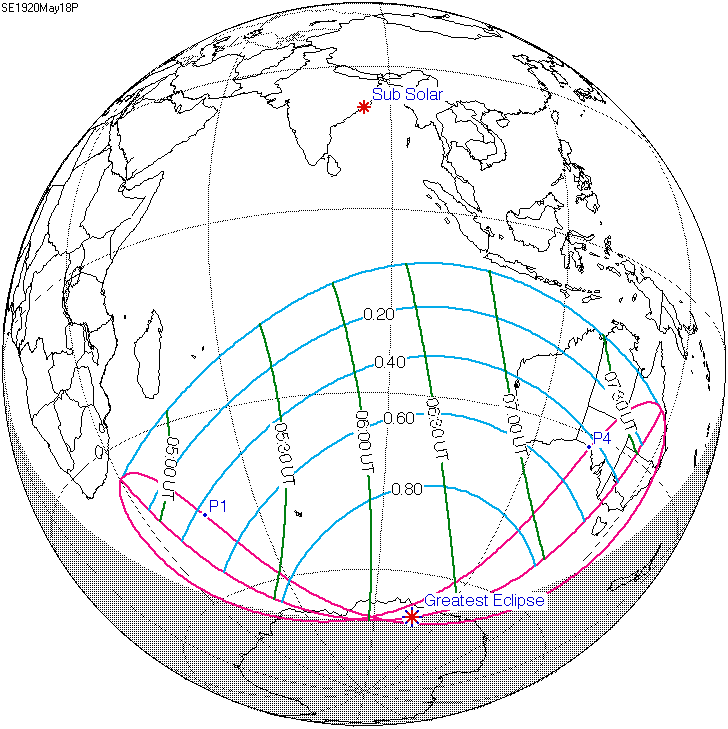
- Map
- Gamma: −1.0239
- Magnitude: 0.9734

Maximum eclipse
- Coordinates: 69.1°S 107.7°E

Times (UTC)
- Greatest eclipse: 6:14:55

References
- Saros: 146 (22 of 76)
- Catalog # (SE5000): 9328

A partial solar eclipse occurred at the Moon's descending node of orbit on Tuesday, May 18, 1920, with a magnitude of 0.9734. A solar eclipse occurs when the Moon passes between Earth and the Sun, thereby totally or partly obscuring the image of the Sun for a viewer on Earth. A partial solar eclipse occurs in the polar regions of the Earth when the center of the Moon's shadow misses the Earth.

A partial eclipse was visible for parts of Australia and Antarctica.

== Eclipse details ==
Shown below are two tables displaying details about this particular solar eclipse. The first table outlines times at which the Moon's penumbra or umbra attains the specific parameter, and the second table describes various other parameters pertaining to this eclipse.

May 18, 1920 Solar Eclipse Times
Event	Time (UTC)
First Penumbral External Contact	1920 May 18 at 04:17:02.5 UTC
Equatorial Conjunction	1920 May 18 at 06:00:25.5 UTC
Greatest Eclipse	1920 May 18 at 06:14:55.0 UTC
Ecliptic Conjunction	1920 May 18 at 06:25:08.5 UTC
Last Penumbral External Contact	1920 May 18 at 08:12:51.9 UTC

May 18, 1920 Solar Eclipse Parameters
Parameter	Value
Eclipse Magnitude	0.97341
Eclipse Obscuration	0.97587
Gamma	−1.02391
Sun Right Ascension	03h38m46.6s
Sun Declination	+19°29'30.0"
Sun Semi-Diameter	15'48.4"
Sun Equatorial Horizontal Parallax	08.7"
Moon Right Ascension	03h39m22.1s
Moon Declination	+18°27'48.5"
Moon Semi-Diameter	16'36.5"
Moon Equatorial Horizontal Parallax	1°00'57.1"
ΔT	21.6 s

== Eclipse season ==
This eclipse is part of an eclipse season, a period, roughly every six months, when eclipses occur. Only two (or occasionally three) eclipse seasons occur each year, and each season lasts about 35 days and repeats just short of six months (173 days) later; thus two full eclipse seasons always occur each year. Either two or three eclipses happen each eclipse season. In the sequence below, each eclipse is separated by a fortnight.

Eclipse season of May 1920
May 3 Ascending node (full moon)	May 18 Descending node (new moon)
Total lunar eclipse Lunar Saros 120	Partial solar eclipse Solar Saros 146

== Related eclipses ==
=== Eclipses in 1920 ===
- A total lunar eclipse on May 3.
- A partial solar eclipse on May 18.
- A total lunar eclipse on October 27.
- A partial solar eclipse on November 10.

=== Metonic ===
- Preceded by: Solar eclipse of July 30, 1916
- Followed by: Solar eclipse of March 5, 1924

=== Tzolkinex ===
- Preceded by: Solar eclipse of April 6, 1913
- Followed by: Solar eclipse of June 29, 1927

=== Half-Saros ===
- Preceded by: Lunar eclipse of May 13, 1911
- Followed by: Lunar eclipse of May 23, 1929

=== Tritos ===
- Preceded by: Solar eclipse of June 17, 1909
- Followed by: Solar eclipse of April 18, 1931

=== Solar Saros 146 ===
- Preceded by: Solar eclipse of May 7, 1902
- Followed by: Solar eclipse of May 29, 1938

=== Inex ===
- Preceded by: Solar eclipse of June 6, 1891
- Followed by: Solar eclipse of April 28, 1949

=== Triad ===
- Preceded by: Solar eclipse of July 17, 1833
- Followed by: Solar eclipse of March 19, 2007

=== Solar eclipses of 1916–1920 ===
This eclipse is a member of a semester series. An eclipse in a semester series of solar eclipses repeats approximately every 177 days and 4 hours (a semester) at alternating nodes of the Moon's orbit.

The solar eclipses on February 3, 1916 (total), July 30, 1916 (annular), January 23, 1917 (partial), and July 19, 1917 (partial) occur in the previous lunar year eclipse set.

Solar eclipse series sets from 1916 to 1920
Ascending node			Descending node		
Saros	Map	Gamma	Saros	Map	Gamma
111	December 24, 1916 Partial	−1.5321	116	June 19, 1917 Partial	1.2857
121	December 14, 1917 Annular	−0.9157	126	June 8, 1918 Total	0.4658
131	December 3, 1918 Annular	−0.2387	136 Totality in Príncipe	May 29, 1919 Total	−0.2955
141	November 22, 1919 Annular	0.4549	146	May 18, 1920 Partial	−1.0239
151	November 10, 1920 Partial	1.1287			

=== Saros 146 ===
This eclipse is a part of Saros series 146, repeating every 18 years, 11 days, and containing 76 events. The series started with a partial solar eclipse on September 19, 1541. It contains total eclipses from May 29, 1938 through October 7, 2154; hybrid eclipses from October 17, 2172 through November 20, 2226; and annular eclipses from November 30, 2244 through August 10, 2659. The series ends at member 76 as a partial eclipse on December 29, 2893. Its eclipses are tabulated in three columns; every third eclipse in the same column is one exeligmos apart, so they all cast shadows over approximately the same parts of the Earth.

The longest duration of totality was produced by member 26 at 5 minutes, 21 seconds on June 30, 1992, and the longest duration of annularity will be produced by member 63 at 3 minutes, 30 seconds on August 10, 2659. All eclipses in this series occur at the Moon’s descending node of orbit.

Series members 16–37 occur between 1801 and 2200:
16	17	18
March 13, 1812	March 24, 1830	April 3, 1848
19	20	21
April 15, 1866	April 25, 1884	May 7, 1902
22	23	24
May 18, 1920	May 29, 1938	June 8, 1956
25	26	27
June 20, 1974	June 30, 1992	July 11, 2010
28	29	30
July 22, 2028	August 2, 2046	August 12, 2064
31	32	33
August 24, 2082	September 4, 2100	September 15, 2118
34	35	36
September 26, 2136	October 7, 2154	October 17, 2172
37
October 29, 2190

=== Metonic series ===
The metonic series repeats eclipses every 19 years (6939.69 days), lasting about 5 cycles. Eclipses occur in nearly the same calendar date. In addition, the octon subseries repeats 1/5 of that or every 3.8 years (1387.94 days). All eclipses in this table occur at the Moon's descending node.

22 eclipse events between March 5, 1848 and July 30, 1935
March 5–6	December 22–24	October 9–11	July 29–30	May 17–18
108	110	112	114	116
March 5, 1848			July 29, 1859	May 17, 1863
118	120	122	124	126
March 6, 1867	December 22, 1870	October 10, 1874	July 29, 1878	May 17, 1882
128	130	132	134	136
March 5, 1886	December 22, 1889	October 9, 1893	July 29, 1897	May 18, 1901
138	140	142	144	146
March 6, 1905	December 23, 1908	October 10, 1912	July 30, 1916	May 18, 1920
148	150	152	154	
March 5, 1924	December 24, 1927	October 11, 1931	July 30, 1935	

=== Tritos series ===
This eclipse is a part of a tritos cycle, repeating at alternating nodes every 135 synodic months (≈ 3986.63 days, or 11 years minus 1 month). Their appearance and longitude are irregular due to a lack of synchronization with the anomalistic month (period of perigee), but groupings of 3 tritos cycles (≈ 33 years minus 3 months) come close (≈ 434.044 anomalistic months), so eclipses are similar in these groupings.

The partial solar eclipse on November 4, 2116 (part of Saros 164) is also a part of this series but is not included in the table below.

Series members between 1801 and 2029
March 24, 1811 (Saros 136)	February 21, 1822 (Saros 137)	January 20, 1833 (Saros 138)	December 21, 1843 (Saros 139)	November 20, 1854 (Saros 140)
October 19, 1865 (Saros 141)	September 17, 1876 (Saros 142)	August 19, 1887 (Saros 143)	July 18, 1898 (Saros 144)	June 17, 1909 (Saros 145)
May 18, 1920 (Saros 146)	April 18, 1931 (Saros 147)	March 16, 1942 (Saros 148)	February 14, 1953 (Saros 149)	January 14, 1964 (Saros 150)
December 13, 1974 (Saros 151)	November 12, 1985 (Saros 152)	October 12, 1996 (Saros 153)	September 11, 2007 (Saros 154)	August 11, 2018 (Saros 155)
July 11, 2029 (Saros 156)

=== Inex series ===
This eclipse is a part of the long period inex cycle, repeating at alternating nodes, every 358 synodic months (≈ 10,571.95 days, or 29 years minus 20 days). Their appearance and longitude are irregular due to a lack of synchronization with the anomalistic month (period of perigee). However, groupings of 3 inex cycles (≈ 87 years minus 2 months) comes close (≈ 1,151.02 anomalistic months), so eclipses are similar in these groupings.

Series members between 1801 and 2200
August 5, 1804 (Saros 142)	July 17, 1833 (Saros 143)	June 27, 1862 (Saros 144)
June 6, 1891 (Saros 145)	May 18, 1920 (Saros 146)	April 28, 1949 (Saros 147)
April 7, 1978 (Saros 148)	March 19, 2007 (Saros 149)	February 27, 2036 (Saros 150)
February 5, 2065 (Saros 151)	January 16, 2094 (Saros 152)	December 28, 2122 (Saros 153)
December 8, 2151 (Saros 154)	November 17, 2180 (Saros 155)	
