= Solar eclipse of August 24, 2082 =

Total eclipse

- Total eclipse
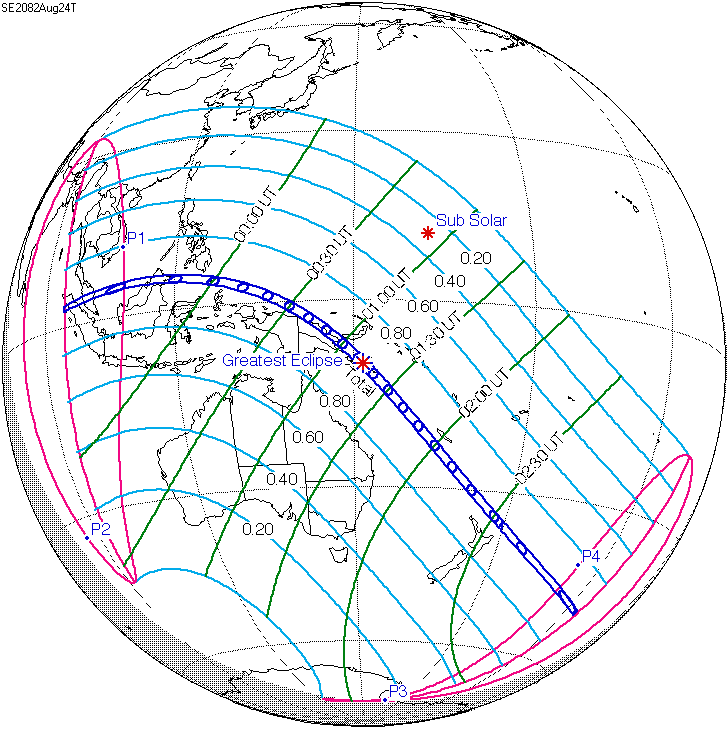
- Map
- Gamma: −0.4004
- Magnitude: 1.0452

Maximum eclipse
- Duration: 241 s (4 min 1 s)
- Coordinates: 10.3°S 151.8°E
- Max. width of band: 163 km (101 mi)

Times (UTC)
- Greatest eclipse: 1:16:21

References
- Saros: 146 (31 of 76)
- Catalog # (SE5000): 9692

A total solar eclipse will occur at the Moon's descending node of orbit between Sunday, August 23 and Monday, August 24, 2082, with a magnitude of 1.0452. A solar eclipse occurs when the Moon passes between Earth and the Sun, thereby totally or partly obscuring the image of the Sun for a viewer on Earth. A total solar eclipse occurs when the Moon's apparent diameter is larger than the Sun's, blocking all direct sunlight, turning day into darkness. Totality occurs in a narrow path across Earth's surface, with the partial solar eclipse visible over a surrounding region thousands of kilometres wide. Occurring about 2.3 days before perigee (on August 26, 2082, at 8:55 UTC), the Moon's apparent diameter will be larger.

The path of totality will be visible from parts of Indonesia, Malaysia, Brunei, and Papua New Guinea. A partial solar eclipse will also be visible for parts of Southeast Asia, Australia, Oceania, and Antarctica.

== Eclipse details ==
Shown below are two tables displaying details about this particular solar eclipse. The first table outlines times at which the Moon's penumbra or umbra attains the specific parameter, and the second table describes various other parameters pertaining to this eclipse.

August 24, 2082 Solar Eclipse Times
Event	Time (UTC)
First Penumbral External Contact	2082 August 23 at 22:39:12.0 UTC
First Umbral External Contact	2082 August 23 at 23:38:33.6 UTC
First Central Line	2082 August 23 at 23:39:25.2 UTC
First Umbral Internal Contact	2082 August 23 at 23:40:16.9 UTC
First Penumbral Internal Contact	2082 August 24 at 00:52:17.7 UTC
Greatest Duration	2082 August 24 at 01:13:20.7 UTC
Greatest Eclipse	2082 August 24 at 01:16:20.6 UTC
Ecliptic Conjunction	2082 August 24 at 01:20:30.9 UTC
Equatorial Conjunction	2082 August 24 at 01:37:24.7 UTC
Last Penumbral Internal Contact	2082 August 24 at 01:39:55.8 UTC
Last Umbral Internal Contact	2082 August 24 at 02:52:08.5 UTC
Last Central Line	2082 August 24 at 02:53:02.4 UTC
Last Umbral External Contact	2082 August 24 at 02:53:56.2 UTC
Last Penumbral External Contact	2082 August 24 at 03:53:16.2 UTC

August 24, 2082 Solar Eclipse Parameters
Parameter	Value
Eclipse Magnitude	1.04515
Eclipse Obscuration	1.09235
Gamma	−0.40035
Sun Right Ascension	10h13m33.7s
Sun Declination	+10°59'07.1"
Sun Semi-Diameter	15'48.9"
Sun Equatorial Horizontal Parallax	08.7"
Moon Right Ascension	10h12m50.5s
Moon Declination	+10°37'45.2"
Moon Semi-Diameter	16'16.8"
Moon Equatorial Horizontal Parallax	0°59'44.8"
ΔT	107.6 s

== Eclipse season ==
This eclipse is part of an eclipse season, a period, roughly every six months, when eclipses occur. Only two (or occasionally three) eclipse seasons occur each year, and each season lasts about 35 days and repeats just short of six months (173 days) later; thus two full eclipse seasons always occur each year. Either two or three eclipses happen each eclipse season. In the sequence below, each eclipse is separated by a fortnight.

Eclipse season of August 2082
August 8 Ascending node (full moon)	August 24 Descending node (new moon)
Penumbral lunar eclipse Lunar Saros 120	Total solar eclipse Solar Saros 146

== Related eclipses ==
=== Eclipses in 2082 ===
- A partial lunar eclipse on February 13.
- An annular solar eclipse on February 27.
- A penumbral lunar eclipse on August 8.
- A total solar eclipse on August 24.

=== Metonic ===
- Preceded by: Solar eclipse of November 4, 2078
- Followed by: Solar eclipse of June 11, 2086

=== Tzolkinex ===
- Preceded by: Solar eclipse of July 13, 2075
- Followed by: Solar eclipse of October 4, 2089

=== Half-Saros ===
- Preceded by: Lunar eclipse of August 17, 2073
- Followed by: Lunar eclipse of August 29, 2091

=== Tritos ===
- Preceded by: Solar eclipse of September 23, 2071
- Followed by: Solar eclipse of July 23, 2093

=== Solar Saros 146 ===
- Preceded by: Solar eclipse of August 12, 2064
- Followed by: Solar eclipse of September 4, 2100

=== Inex ===
- Preceded by: Solar eclipse of September 12, 2053
- Followed by: Solar eclipse of August 4, 2111

=== Triad ===
- Preceded by: Solar eclipse of October 24, 1995
- Followed by: Solar eclipse of June 24, 2169

=== Solar eclipses of 2080–2083 ===
This eclipse is a member of a semester series. An eclipse in a semester series of solar eclipses repeats approximately every 177 days and 4 hours (a semester) at alternating nodes of the Moon's orbit.

The partial solar eclipse on July 15, 2083 occurs in the next lunar year eclipse set.

Solar eclipse series sets from 2080 to 2083
Ascending node			Descending node		
Saros	Map	Gamma	Saros	Map	Gamma
121	March 21, 2080 Partial	−1.0578	126	September 13, 2080 Partial	1.0723
131	March 10, 2081 Annular	−0.3653	136	September 3, 2081 Total	0.3378
141	February 27, 2082 Annular	0.3361	146	August 24, 2082 Total	−0.4004
151	February 16, 2083 Partial	1.017	156	August 13, 2083 Partial	−1.2064

=== Saros 146 ===
This eclipse is a part of Saros series 146, repeating every 18 years, 11 days, and containing 76 events. The series started with a partial solar eclipse on September 19, 1541. It contains total eclipses from May 29, 1938 through October 7, 2154; hybrid eclipses from October 17, 2172 through November 20, 2226; and annular eclipses from November 30, 2244 through August 10, 2659. The series ends at member 76 as a partial eclipse on December 29, 2893. Its eclipses are tabulated in three columns; every third eclipse in the same column is one exeligmos apart, so they all cast shadows over approximately the same parts of the Earth.

The longest duration of totality was produced by member 26 at 5 minutes, 21 seconds on June 30, 1992, and the longest duration of annularity will be produced by member 63 at 3 minutes, 30 seconds on August 10, 2659. All eclipses in this series occur at the Moon’s descending node of orbit.

Series members 16–37 occur between 1801 and 2200:
16	17	18
March 13, 1812	March 24, 1830	April 3, 1848
19	20	21
April 15, 1866	April 25, 1884	May 7, 1902
22	23	24
May 18, 1920	May 29, 1938	June 8, 1956
25	26	27
June 20, 1974	June 30, 1992	July 11, 2010
28	29	30
July 22, 2028	August 2, 2046	August 12, 2064
31	32	33
August 24, 2082	September 4, 2100	September 15, 2118
34	35	36
September 26, 2136	October 7, 2154	October 17, 2172
37
October 29, 2190

=== Metonic series ===
The metonic series repeats eclipses every 19 years (6939.69 days), lasting about 5 cycles. Eclipses occur in nearly the same calendar date. In addition, the octon subseries repeats 1/5 of that or every 3.8 years (1387.94 days). All eclipses in this table occur at the Moon's descending node.

22 eclipse events between June 12, 2029 and November 4, 2116
June 11–12	March 30–31	January 16	November 4–5	August 23–24
118	120	122	124	126
June 12, 2029	March 30, 2033	January 16, 2037	November 4, 2040	August 23, 2044
128	130	132	134	136
June 11, 2048	March 30, 2052	January 16, 2056	November 5, 2059	August 24, 2063
138	140	142	144	146
June 11, 2067	March 31, 2071	January 16, 2075	November 4, 2078	August 24, 2082
148	150	152	154	156
June 11, 2086	March 31, 2090	January 16, 2094	November 4, 2097	August 24, 2101
158	160	162	164	
June 12, 2105			November 4, 2116	

=== Tritos series ===
This eclipse is a part of a tritos cycle, repeating at alternating nodes every 135 synodic months (≈ 3986.63 days, or 11 years minus 1 month). Their appearance and longitude are irregular due to a lack of synchronization with the anomalistic month (period of perigee), but groupings of 3 tritos cycles (≈ 33 years minus 3 months) come close (≈ 434.044 anomalistic months), so eclipses are similar in these groupings.

Series members between 1801 and 2200
October 9, 1809 (Saros 121)	September 7, 1820 (Saros 122)	August 7, 1831 (Saros 123)	July 8, 1842 (Saros 124)	June 6, 1853 (Saros 125)
May 6, 1864 (Saros 126)	April 6, 1875 (Saros 127)	March 5, 1886 (Saros 128)	February 1, 1897 (Saros 129)	January 3, 1908 (Saros 130)
December 3, 1918 (Saros 131)	November 1, 1929 (Saros 132)	October 1, 1940 (Saros 133)	September 1, 1951 (Saros 134)	July 31, 1962 (Saros 135)
June 30, 1973 (Saros 136)	May 30, 1984 (Saros 137)	April 29, 1995 (Saros 138)	March 29, 2006 (Saros 139)	February 26, 2017 (Saros 140)
January 26, 2028 (Saros 141)	December 26, 2038 (Saros 142)	November 25, 2049 (Saros 143)	October 24, 2060 (Saros 144)	September 23, 2071 (Saros 145)
August 24, 2082 (Saros 146)	July 23, 2093 (Saros 147)	June 22, 2104 (Saros 148)	May 24, 2115 (Saros 149)	April 22, 2126 (Saros 150)
March 21, 2137 (Saros 151)	February 19, 2148 (Saros 152)	January 19, 2159 (Saros 153)	December 18, 2169 (Saros 154)	November 17, 2180 (Saros 155)
October 18, 2191 (Saros 156)

=== Inex series ===
This eclipse is a part of the long period inex cycle, repeating at alternating nodes, every 358 synodic months (≈ 10,571.95 days, or 29 years minus 20 days). Their appearance and longitude are irregular due to a lack of synchronization with the anomalistic month (period of perigee). However, groupings of 3 inex cycles (≈ 87 years minus 2 months) comes close (≈ 1,151.02 anomalistic months), so eclipses are similar in these groupings.

Series members between 1801 and 2200
February 21, 1822 (Saros 137)	February 1, 1851 (Saros 138)	January 11, 1880 (Saros 139)
December 23, 1908 (Saros 140)	December 2, 1937 (Saros 141)	November 12, 1966 (Saros 142)
October 24, 1995 (Saros 143)	October 2, 2024 (Saros 144)	September 12, 2053 (Saros 145)
August 24, 2082 (Saros 146)	August 4, 2111 (Saros 147)	July 14, 2140 (Saros 148)
June 25, 2169 (Saros 149)	June 4, 2198 (Saros 150)	
