= Solar eclipse of January 3, 1927 =

20th-century annular solar eclipse

- Annular eclipse
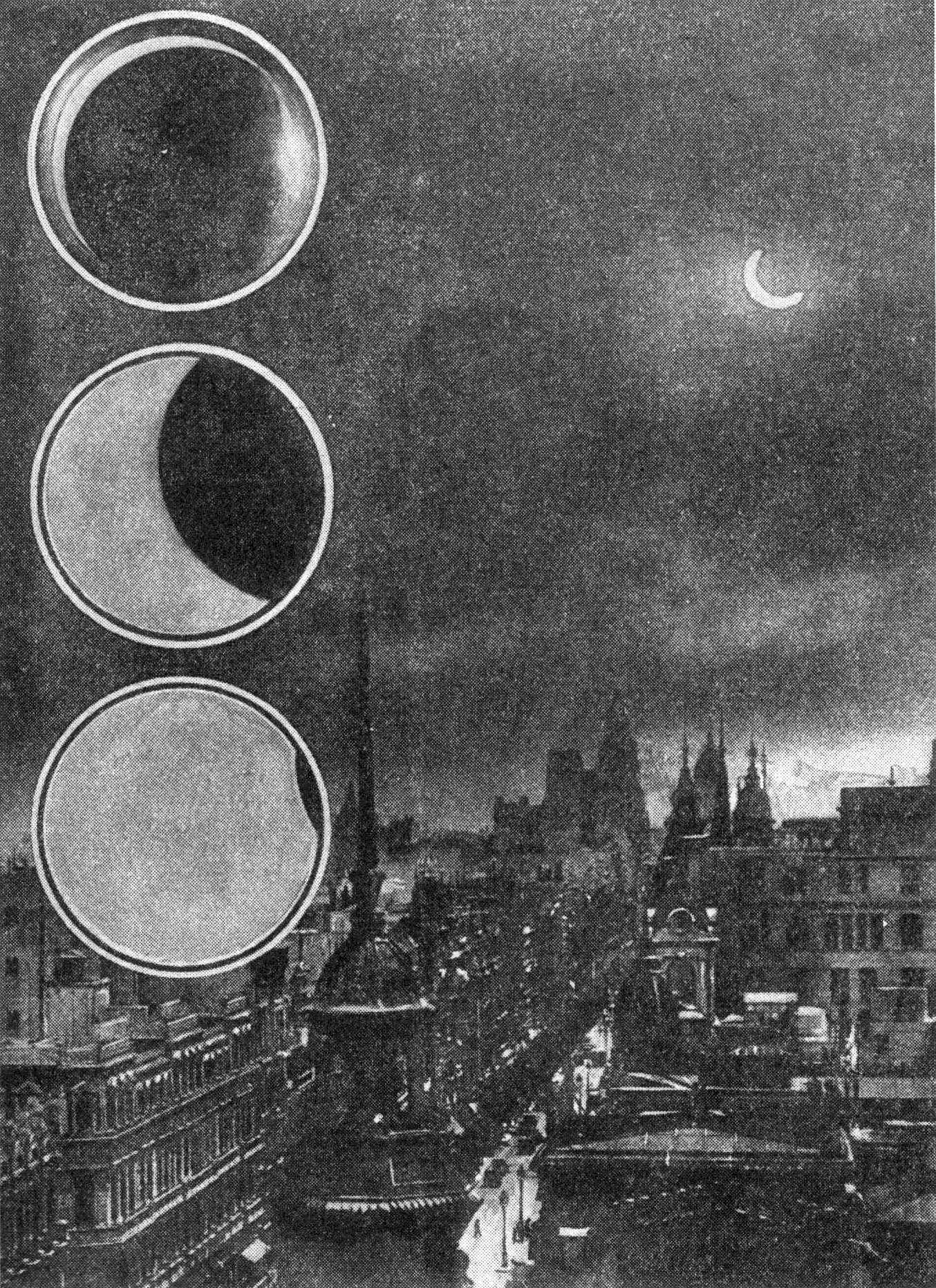
- View of the eclipse from Buenos Aires

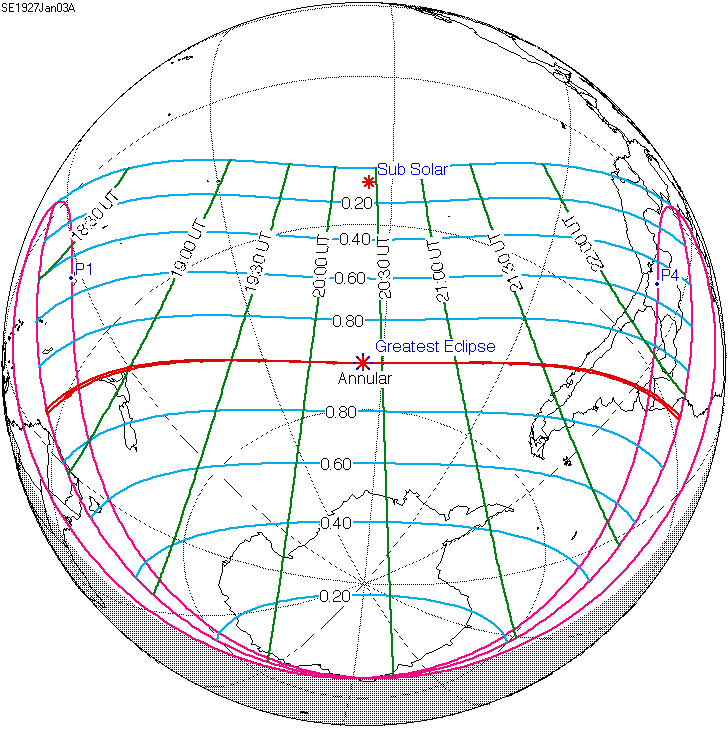
- Map
- Gamma: −0.4956
- Magnitude: 0.9995

Maximum eclipse
- Duration: 3 s (0 min 3 s)
- Coordinates: 52.8°S 124.8°W
- Max. width of band: 2 km (1.2 mi)

Times (UTC)
- Greatest eclipse: 20:22:53

References
- Saros: 140 (24 of 71)
- Catalog # (SE5000): 9343

An annular solar eclipse occurred at the Moon's descending node of orbit between Monday, January 3 and Tuesday, January 4, 1927, with a magnitude of 0.9995. A solar eclipse occurs when the Moon passes between Earth and the Sun, thereby totally or partly obscuring the image of the Sun for a viewer on Earth. An annular solar eclipse occurs when the Moon's apparent diameter is smaller than the Sun's, blocking most of the Sun's light and causing the Sun to look like an annulus (ring). An annular eclipse appears as a partial eclipse over a region of the Earth thousands of kilometres wide. The Moon's apparent diameter was near the average diameter because it occurred 8.6 days after apogee (on December 26, 1926, at 7:10 UTC) and 3.3 days before perigee (on January 7, 1927, at 3:00 UTC).

Annularity was visible from New Zealand on January 4 (Tuesday), and Chile, Argentina, Uruguay and southern Brazil on January 3 (Monday). A partial eclipse was visible for parts of Oceania, Antarctica, and South America.

== Eclipse details ==
Shown below are two tables displaying details about this particular solar eclipse. The first table outlines times at which the Moon's penumbra or umbra attains the specific parameter, and the second table describes various other parameters pertaining to this eclipse.

January 3, 1927 Solar Eclipse Times
Event	Time (UTC)
First Penumbral External Contact	1927 January 3 at 17:44:12.4 UTC
First Umbral External Contact	1927 January 3 at 18:48:36.9 UTC
First Central Line	1927 January 3 at 18:49:09.7 UTC
Greatest Duration	1927 January 3 at 18:49:09.7 UTC
First Umbral Internal Contact	1927 January 3 at 18:49:42.5 UTC
Greatest Eclipse	1927 January 3 at 20:22:53.1 UTC
Equatorial Conjunction	1927 January 3 at 20:23:09.7 UTC
Ecliptic Conjunction	1927 January 3 at 20:28:11.0 UTC
Last Umbral Internal Contact	1927 January 3 at 21:56:05.6 UTC
Last Central Line	1927 January 3 at 21:56:35.8 UTC
Last Umbral External Contact	1927 January 3 at 21:57:05.9 UTC
Last Penumbral External Contact	1927 January 3 at 23:01:27.9 UTC

January 3, 1927 Solar Eclipse Parameters
Parameter	Value
Eclipse Magnitude	0.99947
Eclipse Obscuration	0.99894
Gamma	−0.49559
Sun Right Ascension	18h54m14.6s
Sun Declination	-22°51'45.8"
Sun Semi-Diameter	16'15.9"
Sun Equatorial Horizontal Parallax	08.9"
Moon Right Ascension	18h54m13.9s
Moon Declination	-23°20'50.4"
Moon Semi-Diameter	16'01.7"
Moon Equatorial Horizontal Parallax	0°58'49.4"
ΔT	24.5 s

== Eclipse season ==
This eclipse is part of an eclipse season, a period, roughly every six months, when eclipses occur. Only two (or occasionally three) eclipse seasons occur each year, and each season lasts about 35 days and repeats just short of six months (173 days) later; thus two full eclipse seasons always occur each year. Either two or three eclipses happen each eclipse season. In the sequence below, each eclipse is separated by a fortnight.

Eclipse season of December 1926–January 1927
December 19 Ascending node (full moon)	January 3 Descending node (new moon)
Penumbral lunar eclipse Lunar Saros 114	Annular solar eclipse Solar Saros 140

== Related eclipses ==
=== Eclipses in 1927 ===
- An annular solar eclipse on January 3.
- A total lunar eclipse on June 15.
- A total solar eclipse on June 29.
- A total lunar eclipse on December 8.
- A partial solar eclipse on December 24.

=== Metonic ===
- Preceded by: Solar eclipse of March 17, 1923
- Followed by: Solar eclipse of October 21, 1930

=== Tzolkinex ===
- Preceded by: Solar eclipse of November 22, 1919
- Followed by: Solar eclipse of February 14, 1934

=== Half-Saros ===
- Preceded by: Lunar eclipse of December 28, 1917
- Followed by: Lunar eclipse of January 8, 1936

=== Tritos ===
- Preceded by: Solar eclipse of February 3, 1916
- Followed by: Solar eclipse of December 2, 1937

=== Solar Saros 140 ===
- Preceded by: Solar eclipse of December 23, 1908
- Followed by: Solar eclipse of January 14, 1945

=== Inex ===
- Preceded by: Solar eclipse of January 22, 1898
- Followed by: Solar eclipse of December 14, 1955

=== Triad ===
- Preceded by: Solar eclipse of March 4, 1840
- Followed by: Solar eclipse of November 3, 2013

=== Solar eclipses of 1924–1928 ===
This eclipse is a member of a semester series. An eclipse in a semester series of solar eclipses repeats approximately every 177 days and 4 hours (a semester) at alternating nodes of the Moon's orbit.

The partial solar eclipses on March 5, 1924 and August 30, 1924 occur in the previous lunar year eclipse set, and the solar eclipses on May 19, 1928 and November 12, 1928 occur in the next lunar year eclipse set.

Solar eclipse series sets from 1924 to 1928
Ascending node			Descending node		
Saros	Map	Gamma	Saros	Map	Gamma
115	July 31, 1924 Partial	−1.4459	120	January 24, 1925 Total	0.8661
125	July 20, 1925 Annular	−0.7193	130 Totality in Sumatra, Indonesia	January 14, 1926 Total	0.1973
135	July 9, 1926 Annular	0.0538	140	January 3, 1927 Annular	−0.4956
145	June 29, 1927 Total	0.8163	150	December 24, 1927 Partial	−1.2416
155	June 17, 1928 Partial	1.5107			

=== Saros 140 ===
This eclipse is a part of Saros series 140, repeating every 18 years, 11 days, and containing 71 events. The series started with a partial solar eclipse on April 16, 1512. It contains total eclipses from July 21, 1656 through November 9, 1836; hybrid eclipses from November 20, 1854 through December 23, 1908; and annular eclipses from January 3, 1927 through December 7, 2485. The series ends at member 71 as a partial eclipse on June 1, 2774. Its eclipses are tabulated in three columns; every third eclipse in the same column is one exeligmos apart, so they all cast shadows over approximately the same parts of the Earth.

The longest duration of totality was produced by member 11 at 4 minutes, 10 seconds on August 12, 1692, and the longest duration of annularity will be produced by member 53 at 7 minutes, 35 seconds on November 15, 2449. All eclipses in this series occur at the Moon’s descending node of orbit.

Series members 18–39 occur between 1801 and 2200:
18	19	20
October 29, 1818	November 9, 1836	November 20, 1854
21	22	23
November 30, 1872	December 12, 1890	December 23, 1908
24	25	26
January 3, 1927	January 14, 1945	January 25, 1963
27	28	29
February 4, 1981	February 16, 1999	February 26, 2017
30	31	32
March 9, 2035	March 20, 2053	March 31, 2071
33	34	35
April 10, 2089	April 23, 2107	May 3, 2125
36	37	38
May 14, 2143	May 25, 2161	June 5, 2179
39
June 15, 2197

=== Metonic series ===
The metonic series repeats eclipses every 19 years (6939.69 days), lasting about 5 cycles. Eclipses occur in nearly the same calendar date. In addition, the octon subseries repeats 1/5 of that or every 3.8 years (1387.94 days). All eclipses in this table occur at the Moon's descending node.

22 eclipse events between March 16, 1866 and August 9, 1953
March 16–17	January 1–3	October 20–22	August 9–10	May 27–29
108	110	112	114	116
March 16, 1866			August 9, 1877	May 27, 1881
118	120	122	124	126
March 16, 1885	January 1, 1889	October 20, 1892	August 9, 1896	May 28, 1900
128	130	132	134	136
March 17, 1904	January 3, 1908	October 22, 1911	August 10, 1915	May 29, 1919
138	140	142	144	146
March 17, 1923	January 3, 1927	October 21, 1930	August 10, 1934	May 29, 1938
148	150	152	154	
March 16, 1942	January 3, 1946	October 21, 1949	August 9, 1953	

=== Tritos series ===
This eclipse is a part of a tritos cycle, repeating at alternating nodes every 135 synodic months (≈ 3986.63 days, or 11 years minus 1 month). Their appearance and longitude are irregular due to a lack of synchronization with the anomalistic month (period of perigee), but groupings of 3 tritos cycles (≈ 33 years minus 3 months) come close (≈ 434.044 anomalistic months), so eclipses are similar in these groupings.

The partial solar eclipses on December 18, 2188 (part of Saros 164) and November 18, 2199 (part of Saros 165) are also a part of this series but are not included in the table below.

Series members between 1801 and 2134
December 10, 1806 (Saros 129)	November 9, 1817 (Saros 130)	October 9, 1828 (Saros 131)	September 7, 1839 (Saros 132)	August 7, 1850 (Saros 133)
July 8, 1861 (Saros 134)	June 6, 1872 (Saros 135)	May 6, 1883 (Saros 136)	April 6, 1894 (Saros 137)	March 6, 1905 (Saros 138)
February 3, 1916 (Saros 139)	January 3, 1927 (Saros 140)	December 2, 1937 (Saros 141)	November 1, 1948 (Saros 142)	October 2, 1959 (Saros 143)
August 31, 1970 (Saros 144)	July 31, 1981 (Saros 145)	June 30, 1992 (Saros 146)	May 31, 2003 (Saros 147)	April 29, 2014 (Saros 148)
March 29, 2025 (Saros 149)	February 27, 2036 (Saros 150)	January 26, 2047 (Saros 151)	December 26, 2057 (Saros 152)	November 24, 2068 (Saros 153)
October 24, 2079 (Saros 154)	September 23, 2090 (Saros 155)	August 24, 2101 (Saros 156)	July 23, 2112 (Saros 157)	June 23, 2123 (Saros 158)
May 23, 2134 (Saros 159)

=== Inex series ===
This eclipse is a part of the long period inex cycle, repeating at alternating nodes, every 358 synodic months (≈ 10,571.95 days, or 29 years minus 20 days). Their appearance and longitude are irregular due to a lack of synchronization with the anomalistic month (period of perigee). However, groupings of 3 inex cycles (≈ 87 years minus 2 months) comes close (≈ 1,151.02 anomalistic months), so eclipses are similar in these groupings.

Series members between 1801 and 2200
March 24, 1811 (Saros 136)	March 4, 1840 (Saros 137)	February 11, 1869 (Saros 138)
January 22, 1898 (Saros 139)	January 3, 1927 (Saros 140)	December 14, 1955 (Saros 141)
November 22, 1984 (Saros 142)	November 3, 2013 (Saros 143)	October 14, 2042 (Saros 144)
September 23, 2071 (Saros 145)	September 4, 2100 (Saros 146)	August 15, 2129 (Saros 147)
July 25, 2158 (Saros 148)	July 6, 2187 (Saros 149)	
