= Solar eclipse of July 30, 1916 =

20th-century annular solar eclipse

- Annular eclipse
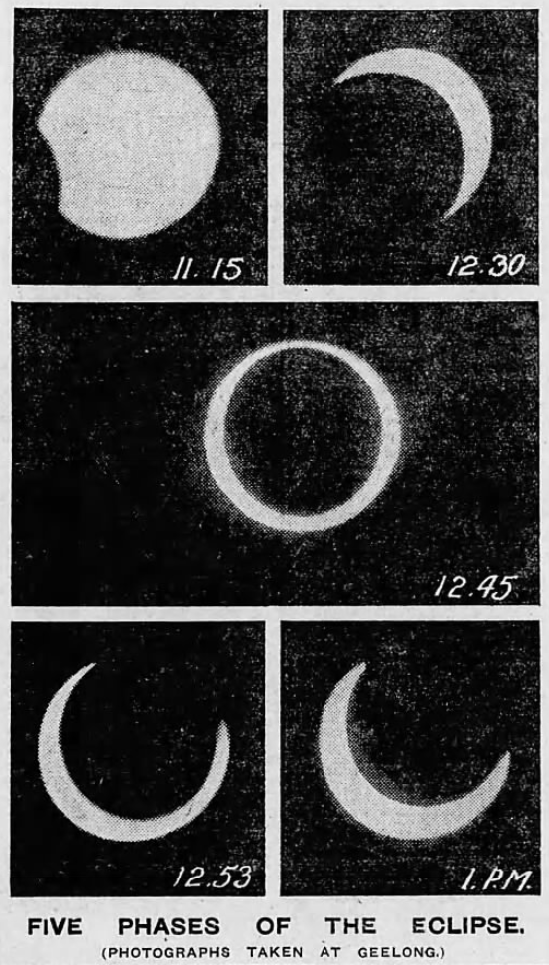

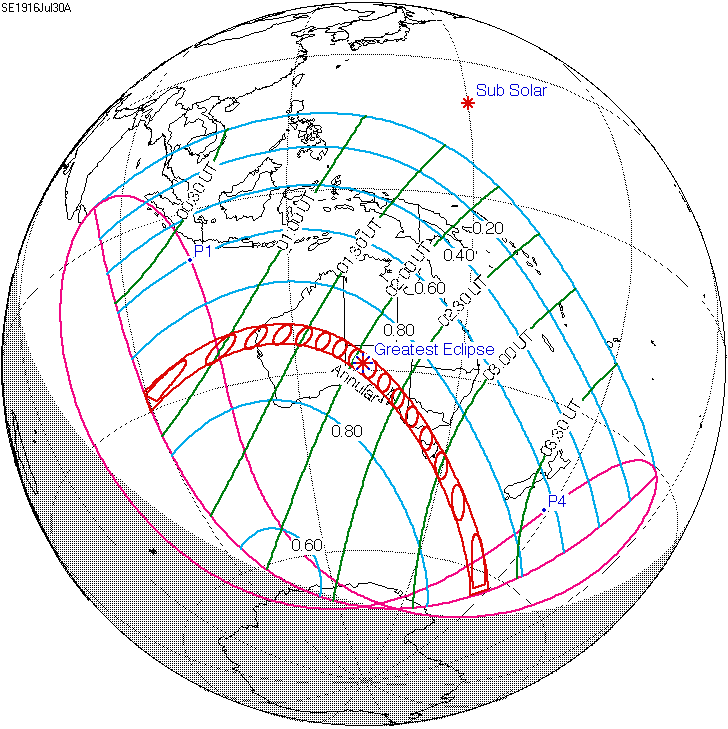
- Map
- Gamma: −0.7709
- Magnitude: 0.9447

Maximum eclipse
- Duration: 384 s (6 min 24 s)
- Coordinates: 29°S 132.4°E
- Max. width of band: 313 km (194 mi)

Times (UTC)
- Greatest eclipse: 2:06:10

References
- Saros: 144 (11 of 70)
- Catalog # (SE5000): 9318

An annular solar eclipse occurred at the Moon's descending node of orbit between Saturday, July 29 and Sunday, July 30, 1916, with a magnitude of 0.9447. A solar eclipse occurs when the Moon passes between Earth and the Sun, thereby totally or partly obscuring the image of the Sun for a viewer on Earth. An annular solar eclipse occurs when the Moon's apparent diameter is smaller than the Sun's, blocking most of the Sun's light and causing the Sun to look like an annulus (ring). An annular eclipse appears as a partial eclipse over a region of the Earth thousands of kilometres wide. Occurring 1.75 days after apogee (on July 28, 1916, at 8:30 UTC), the Moon's apparent diameter was smaller.

Annularity was visible from only one country, Australia. A partial eclipse was visible for parts of Southeast Asia, Australia, Oceania, and Antarctica.

== Eclipse details ==
Shown below are two tables displaying details about this particular solar eclipse. The first table outlines times at which the Moon's penumbra or umbra attains the specific parameter, and the second table describes various other parameters pertaining to this eclipse.

July 30, 1916 Solar Eclipse Times
Event	Time (UTC)
First Penumbral External Contact	1916 July 29 at 23:25:03.9 UTC
First Umbral External Contact	1916 July 30 at 00:47:30.3 UTC
First Central Line	1916 July 30 at 00:50:59.3 UTC
First Umbral Internal Contact	1916 July 30 at 00:54:34.2 UTC
Greatest Duration	1916 July 30 at 01:57:38.0 UTC
Greatest Eclipse	1916 July 30 at 02:06:10.4 UTC
Ecliptic Conjunction	1916 July 30 at 02:15:15.4 UTC
Equatorial Conjunction	1916 July 30 at 02:39:41.5 UTC
Last Umbral Internal Contact	1916 July 30 at 03:17:25.6 UTC
Last Central Line	1916 July 30 at 03:21:00.0 UTC
Last Umbral External Contact	1916 July 30 at 03:24:28.3 UTC
Last Penumbral External Contact	1916 July 30 at 04:47:01.1 UTC

July 30, 1916 Solar Eclipse Parameters
Parameter	Value
Eclipse Magnitude	0.94470
Eclipse Obscuration	0.89247
Gamma	–0.77095
Sun Right Ascension	08h35m48.5s
Sun Declination	+18°38'31.7"
Sun Semi-Diameter	15'45.3"
Sun Equatorial Horizontal Parallax	08.7"
Moon Right Ascension	08h34m48.1s
Moon Declination	+17°59'27.9"
Moon Semi-Diameter	14'44.7"
Moon Equatorial Horizontal Parallax	0°54'06.8"
ΔT	18.7 s

== Eclipse season ==
This eclipse is part of an eclipse season, a period, roughly every six months, when eclipses occur. Only two (or occasionally three) eclipse seasons occur each year, and each season lasts about 35 days and repeats just short of six months (173 days) later; thus two full eclipse seasons always occur each year. Either two or three eclipses happen each eclipse season. In the sequence below, each eclipse is separated by a fortnight.

Eclipse season of July 1916
July 15 Ascending node (full moon)	July 30 Descending node (new moon)
Penumbral lunar eclipse Lunar Saros 118	Annular solar eclipse Solar Saros 144

== Related eclipses ==
=== Eclipses in 1916 ===
- A partial lunar eclipse on January 20.
- A total solar eclipse on February 3.
- A partial lunar eclipse on July 15.
- An annular solar eclipse on July 30.
- A partial solar eclipse on December 24.

=== Metonic ===
- Preceded by: Solar eclipse of October 10, 1912
- Followed by: Solar eclipse of May 18, 1920

=== Tzolkinex ===
- Preceded by: Solar eclipse of June 17, 1909
- Followed by: Solar eclipse of September 10, 1923

=== Half-Saros ===
- Preceded by: Lunar eclipse of July 25, 1907
- Followed by: Lunar eclipse of August 4, 1925

=== Tritos ===
- Preceded by: Solar eclipse of August 30, 1905
- Followed by: Solar eclipse of June 29, 1927

=== Solar Saros 144 ===
- Preceded by: Solar eclipse of July 18, 1898
- Followed by: Solar eclipse of August 10, 1934

=== Inex ===
- Preceded by: Solar eclipse of August 19, 1887
- Followed by: Solar eclipse of July 9, 1945

=== Triad ===
- Preceded by: Solar eclipse of September 28, 1829
- Followed by: Solar eclipse of May 31, 2003

=== Solar eclipses of 1913–1917 ===
This eclipse is a member of a semester series. An eclipse in a semester series of solar eclipses repeats approximately every 177 days and 4 hours (a semester) at alternating nodes of the Moon's orbit.

The partial solar eclipses on April 6, 1913 and September 30, 1913 occur in the previous lunar year eclipse set, and the solar eclipses on December 24, 1916 (partial), June 19, 1917 (partial), and December 14, 1917 (annular) occur in the next lunar year eclipse set.

Solar eclipse series sets from 1913 to 1917
Descending node			Ascending node		
Saros	Map	Gamma	Saros	Map	Gamma
114	August 31, 1913 Partial	1.4512	119	February 25, 1914 Annular	−0.9416
124	August 21, 1914 Total	0.7655	129	February 14, 1915 Annular	−0.2024
134	August 10, 1915 Annular	0.0124	139	February 3, 1916 Total	0.4987
144	July 30, 1916 Annular	−0.7709	149	January 23, 1917 Partial	1.1508
154	July 19, 1917 Partial	−1.5101			

=== Saros 144 ===
This eclipse is a part of Saros series 144, repeating every 18 years, 11 days, and containing 70 events. The series started with a partial solar eclipse on April 11, 1736. It contains annular eclipses from July 7, 1880 through August 27, 2565. There are no hybrid or total eclipses in this set. The series ends at member 70 as a partial eclipse on May 5, 2980. Its eclipses are tabulated in three columns; every third eclipse in the same column is one exeligmos apart, so they all cast shadows over approximately the same parts of the Earth.

The longest duration of annularity will be produced by member 51 at 9 minutes, 52 seconds on December 29, 2168. All eclipses in this series occur at the Moon’s descending node of orbit.

Series members 5–26 occur between 1801 and 2200:
5	6	7
May 25, 1808	June 5, 1826	June 16, 1844
8	9	10
June 27, 1862	July 7, 1880	July 18, 1898
11	12	13
July 30, 1916	August 10, 1934	August 20, 1952
14	15	16
August 31, 1970	September 11, 1988	September 22, 2006
17	18	19
October 2, 2024	October 14, 2042	October 24, 2060
20	21	22
November 4, 2078	November 15, 2096	November 27, 2114
23	24	25
December 7, 2132	December 19, 2150	December 29, 2168
26
January 9, 2187

=== Metonic series ===
The metonic series repeats eclipses every 19 years (6939.69 days), lasting about 5 cycles. Eclipses occur in nearly the same calendar date. In addition, the octon subseries repeats 1/5 of that or every 3.8 years (1387.94 days). All eclipses in this table occur at the Moon's descending node.

22 eclipse events between March 5, 1848 and July 30, 1935
March 5–6	December 22–24	October 9–11	July 29–30	May 17–18
108	110	112	114	116
March 5, 1848			July 29, 1859	May 17, 1863
118	120	122	124	126
March 6, 1867	December 22, 1870	October 10, 1874	July 29, 1878	May 17, 1882
128	130	132	134	136
March 5, 1886	December 22, 1889	October 9, 1893	July 29, 1897	May 18, 1901
138	140	142	144	146
March 6, 1905	December 23, 1908	October 10, 1912	July 30, 1916	May 18, 1920
148	150	152	154	
March 5, 1924	December 24, 1927	October 11, 1931	July 30, 1935	

=== Tritos series ===
This eclipse is a part of a tritos cycle, repeating at alternating nodes every 135 synodic months (≈ 3986.63 days, or 11 years minus 1 month). Their appearance and longitude are irregular due to a lack of synchronization with the anomalistic month (period of perigee), but groupings of 3 tritos cycles (≈ 33 years minus 3 months) come close (≈ 434.044 anomalistic months), so eclipses are similar in these groupings.

The partial solar eclipses on November 16, 2134 (part of Saros 164) and October 16, 2145 (part of Saros 165) are also a part of this series but are not included in the table below.

Series members between 1801 and 2069
June 6, 1807 (Saros 134)	May 5, 1818 (Saros 135)	April 3, 1829 (Saros 136)	March 4, 1840 (Saros 137)	February 1, 1851 (Saros 138)
December 31, 1861 (Saros 139)	November 30, 1872 (Saros 140)	October 30, 1883 (Saros 141)	September 29, 1894 (Saros 142)	August 30, 1905 (Saros 143)
July 30, 1916 (Saros 144)	June 29, 1927 (Saros 145)	May 29, 1938 (Saros 146)	April 28, 1949 (Saros 147)	March 27, 1960 (Saros 148)
February 25, 1971 (Saros 149)	January 25, 1982 (Saros 150)	December 24, 1992 (Saros 151)	November 23, 2003 (Saros 152)	October 23, 2014 (Saros 153)
September 21, 2025 (Saros 154)	August 21, 2036 (Saros 155)	July 22, 2047 (Saros 156)	June 21, 2058 (Saros 157)	May 20, 2069 (Saros 158)

=== Inex series ===
This eclipse is a part of the long period inex cycle, repeating at alternating nodes, every 358 synodic months (≈ 10,571.95 days, or 29 years minus 20 days). Their appearance and longitude are irregular due to a lack of synchronization with the anomalistic month (period of perigee). However, groupings of 3 inex cycles (≈ 87 years minus 2 months) comes close (≈ 1,151.02 anomalistic months), so eclipses are similar in these groupings.

Series members between 1801 and 2200
September 28, 1829 (Saros 141)	September 7, 1858 (Saros 142)	August 19, 1887 (Saros 143)
July 30, 1916 (Saros 144)	July 9, 1945 (Saros 145)	June 20, 1974 (Saros 146)
May 31, 2003 (Saros 147)	May 9, 2032 (Saros 148)	April 20, 2061 (Saros 149)
March 31, 2090 (Saros 150)	March 11, 2119 (Saros 151)	February 19, 2148 (Saros 152)
January 29, 2177 (Saros 153)		
