= Solar eclipse of September 4, 2100 =

Total solar eclipse

- Total eclipse
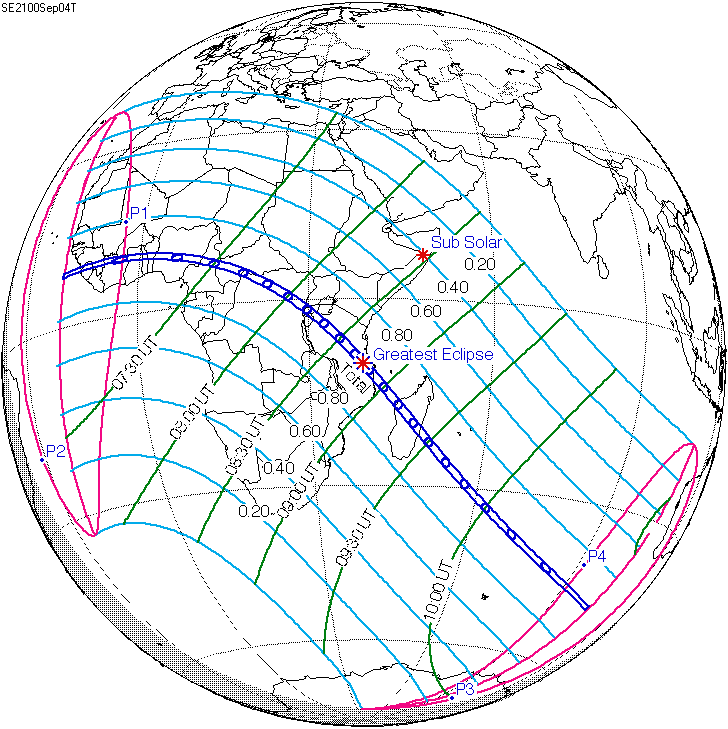
- Map
- Gamma: −0.3384
- Magnitude: 1.0402

Maximum eclipse
- Duration: 212 s (3 min 32 s)
- Coordinates: 10.5°S 39°E
- Max. width of band: 142 km (88 mi)

Times (UTC)
- Greatest eclipse: 8:49:20

References
- Saros: 146 (32 of 76)
- Catalog # (SE5000): 9734

A total solar eclipse will occur at the Moon's descending node of orbit on Saturday, September 4, 2100, with a magnitude of 1.0402. A solar eclipse occurs when the Moon passes between Earth and the Sun, thereby totally or partly obscuring the image of the Sun for a viewer on Earth. A total solar eclipse occurs when the Moon's apparent diameter is larger than the Sun's, blocking all direct sunlight, turning day into darkness. Totality occurs in a narrow path across Earth's surface, with the partial solar eclipse visible over a surrounding region thousands of kilometres wide. Occurring about 2.5 days before perigee (on September 6, 2100, at 20:30 UTC), the Moon's apparent diameter will be larger. This will be the last solar eclipse of the 21st century.

The path of totality will be visible from parts of Sierra Leone, Guinea, Côte d'Ivoire, Ghana, Togo, Benin, Nigeria, Cameroon, the Central African Republic, the Democratic Republic of the Congo, Rwanda, southwestern Uganda, Burundi, Tanzania, Mozambique, and Madagascar. A partial solar eclipse will also be visible for parts of Africa, Southern Europe, the Middle East, and Antarctica.

== Eclipse details ==
Shown below are two tables displaying details about this particular solar eclipse. The first table outlines times at which the Moon's penumbra or umbra attains the specific parameter, and the second table describes various other parameters pertaining to this eclipse.

September 4, 2100 Solar Eclipse Times
Event	Time (UTC)
First Penumbral External Contact	2100 September 4 at 06:09:54.9 UTC
First Umbral External Contact	2100 September 4 at 07:08:48.3 UTC
First Central Line	2100 September 4 at 07:09:29.5 UTC
First Umbral Internal Contact	2100 September 4 at 07:10:10.6 UTC
First Penumbral Internal Contact	2100 September 4 at 08:16:19.6 UTC
Greatest Duration	2100 September 4 at 08:47:54.7 UTC
Greatest Eclipse	2100 September 4 at 08:49:20.3 UTC
Ecliptic Conjunction	2100 September 4 at 08:52:53.1 UTC
Equatorial Conjunction	2100 September 4 at 09:08:27.2 UTC
Last Penumbral Internal Contact	2100 September 4 at 09:21:56.1 UTC
Last Umbral Internal Contact	2100 September 4 at 10:28:15.4 UTC
Last Central Line	2100 September 4 at 10:28:58.8 UTC
Last Umbral External Contact	2100 September 4 at 10:29:42.2 UTC
Last Penumbral External Contact	2100 September 4 at 11:28:33.3 UTC

September 4, 2100 Solar Eclipse Parameters
Parameter	Value
Eclipse Magnitude	1.04021
Eclipse Obscuration	1.08203
Gamma	−0.33839
Sun Right Ascension	10h53m24.7s
Sun Declination	+07°04'34.9"
Sun Semi-Diameter	15'51.3"
Sun Equatorial Horizontal Parallax	08.7"
Moon Right Ascension	10h52m46.7s
Moon Declination	+06°46'49.6"
Moon Semi-Diameter	16'14.1"
Moon Equatorial Horizontal Parallax	0°59'35.2"
ΔT	124.3 s

== Eclipse season ==
This eclipse is part of an eclipse season, a period, roughly every six months, when eclipses occur. Only two (or occasionally three) eclipse seasons occur each year, and each season lasts about 35 days and repeats just short of six months (173 days) later; thus two full eclipse seasons always occur each year. Either two or three eclipses happen each eclipse season. In the sequence below, each eclipse is separated by a fortnight.

Eclipse season of August–September 2100
August 19 Ascending node (full moon)	September 4 Descending node (new moon)
Penumbral lunar eclipse Lunar Saros 120	Total solar eclipse Solar Saros 146

== Related eclipses ==
=== Eclipses in 2100 ===
- A penumbral lunar eclipse on February 24.
- An annular solar eclipse on March 10.
- A penumbral lunar eclipse on August 19.
- A total solar eclipse on September 4.

=== Metonic ===
- Preceded by: Solar eclipse of November 15, 2096
- Followed by: Solar eclipse of June 22, 2104

=== Tzolkinex ===
- Preceded by: Solar eclipse of July 23, 2093
- Followed by: Solar eclipse of October 16, 2107

=== Half-Saros ===
- Preceded by: Lunar eclipse of August 29, 2091
- Followed by: Lunar eclipse of September 9, 2109

=== Tritos ===
- Preceded by: Solar eclipse of October 4, 2089
- Followed by: Solar eclipse of August 4, 2111

=== Solar Saros 146 ===
- Preceded by: Solar eclipse of August 24, 2082
- Followed by: Solar eclipse of September 15, 2118

=== Inex ===
- Preceded by: Solar eclipse of September 23, 2071
- Followed by: Solar eclipse of August 15, 2129

=== Triad ===
- Preceded by: Solar eclipse of November 3, 2013
- Followed by: Solar eclipse of July 6, 2187

=== Solar eclipses of 2098–2101 ===
This eclipse is a member of a semester series. An eclipse in a semester series of solar eclipses repeats approximately every 177 days and 4 hours (a semester) at alternating nodes of the Moon's orbit.

The partial solar eclipse on October 24, 2098 occurs in the previous lunar year eclipse set.

Solar eclipse series sets from 2098 to 2101
Ascending node			Descending node		
Saros	Map	Gamma	Saros	Map	Gamma
121	April 1, 2098 Partial	−1.1005	126	September 25, 2098 Partial	1.14
131	March 21, 2099 Annular	−0.4016	136	September 14, 2099 Total	0.3942
141	March 10, 2100 Annular	0.3077	146	September 4, 2100 Total	−0.3384
151	February 28, 2101 Annular	0.9964	156	August 24, 2101 Partial	−1.1392

=== Saros 146 ===
This eclipse is a part of Saros series 146, repeating every 18 years, 11 days, and containing 76 events. The series started with a partial solar eclipse on September 19, 1541. It contains total eclipses from May 29, 1938 through October 7, 2154; hybrid eclipses from October 17, 2172 through November 20, 2226; and annular eclipses from November 30, 2244 through August 10, 2659. The series ends at member 76 as a partial eclipse on December 29, 2893. Its eclipses are tabulated in three columns; every third eclipse in the same column is one exeligmos apart, so they all cast shadows over approximately the same parts of the Earth.

The longest duration of totality was produced by member 26 at 5 minutes, 21 seconds on June 30, 1992, and the longest duration of annularity will be produced by member 63 at 3 minutes, 30 seconds on August 10, 2659. All eclipses in this series occur at the Moon’s descending node of orbit.

Series members 16–37 occur between 1801 and 2200:
16	17	18
March 13, 1812	March 24, 1830	April 3, 1848
19	20	21
April 15, 1866	April 25, 1884	May 7, 1902
22	23	24
May 18, 1920	May 29, 1938	June 8, 1956
25	26	27
June 20, 1974	June 30, 1992	July 11, 2010
28	29	30
July 22, 2028	August 2, 2046	August 12, 2064
31	32	33
August 24, 2082	September 4, 2100	September 15, 2118
34	35	36
September 26, 2136	October 7, 2154	October 17, 2172
37
October 29, 2190

=== Metonic series ===
The metonic series repeats eclipses every 19 years (6939.69 days), lasting about 5 cycles. Eclipses occur in nearly the same calendar date. In addition, the octon subseries repeats 1/5 of that or every 3.8 years (1387.94 days). All eclipses in this table occur at the Moon's descending node.

22 eclipse events between June 23, 2047 and November 16, 2134
June 22–23	April 10–11	January 27–29	November 15–16	September 3–5
118	120	122	124	126
June 23, 2047	April 11, 2051	January 27, 2055	November 16, 2058	September 3, 2062
128	130	132	134	136
June 22, 2066	April 11, 2070	January 27, 2074	November 15, 2077	September 3, 2081
138	140	142	144	146
June 22, 2085	April 10, 2089	January 27, 2093	November 15, 2096	September 4, 2100
148	150	152	154	156
June 22, 2104	April 11, 2108	January 29, 2112	November 16, 2115	September 5, 2119
158	160	162	164	
June 23, 2123			November 16, 2134	

=== Tritos series ===
This eclipse is a part of a tritos cycle, repeating at alternating nodes every 135 synodic months (≈ 3986.63 days, or 11 years minus 1 month). Their appearance and longitude are irregular due to a lack of synchronization with the anomalistic month (period of perigee), but groupings of 3 tritos cycles (≈ 33 years minus 3 months) come close (≈ 434.044 anomalistic months), so eclipses are similar in these groupings.

Series members between 1801 and 2200
December 21, 1805 (Saros 119)	November 19, 1816 (Saros 120)	October 20, 1827 (Saros 121)	September 18, 1838 (Saros 122)	August 18, 1849 (Saros 123)
July 18, 1860 (Saros 124)	June 18, 1871 (Saros 125)	May 17, 1882 (Saros 126)	April 16, 1893 (Saros 127)	March 17, 1904 (Saros 128)
February 14, 1915 (Saros 129)	January 14, 1926 (Saros 130)	December 13, 1936 (Saros 131)	November 12, 1947 (Saros 132)	October 12, 1958 (Saros 133)
September 11, 1969 (Saros 134)	August 10, 1980 (Saros 135)	July 11, 1991 (Saros 136)	June 10, 2002 (Saros 137)	May 10, 2013 (Saros 138)
April 8, 2024 (Saros 139)	March 9, 2035 (Saros 140)	February 5, 2046 (Saros 141)	January 5, 2057 (Saros 142)	December 6, 2067 (Saros 143)
November 4, 2078 (Saros 144)	October 4, 2089 (Saros 145)	September 4, 2100 (Saros 146)	August 4, 2111 (Saros 147)	July 4, 2122 (Saros 148)
June 3, 2133 (Saros 149)	May 3, 2144 (Saros 150)	April 2, 2155 (Saros 151)	March 2, 2166 (Saros 152)	January 29, 2177 (Saros 153)
December 29, 2187 (Saros 154)	November 28, 2198 (Saros 155)			

=== Inex series ===
This eclipse is a part of the long period inex cycle, repeating at alternating nodes, every 358 synodic months (≈ 10,571.95 days, or 29 years minus 20 days). Their appearance and longitude are irregular due to a lack of synchronization with the anomalistic month (period of perigee). However, groupings of 3 inex cycles (≈ 87 years minus 2 months) comes close (≈ 1,151.02 anomalistic months), so eclipses are similar in these groupings.

Series members between 1801 and 2200
March 24, 1811 (Saros 136)	March 4, 1840 (Saros 137)	February 11, 1869 (Saros 138)
January 22, 1898 (Saros 139)	January 3, 1927 (Saros 140)	December 14, 1955 (Saros 141)
November 22, 1984 (Saros 142)	November 3, 2013 (Saros 143)	October 14, 2042 (Saros 144)
September 23, 2071 (Saros 145)	September 4, 2100 (Saros 146)	August 15, 2129 (Saros 147)
July 25, 2158 (Saros 148)	July 6, 2187 (Saros 149)	
