= July 1936 lunar eclipse =

Partial lunar eclipse July 4, 1936

- Partial eclipse
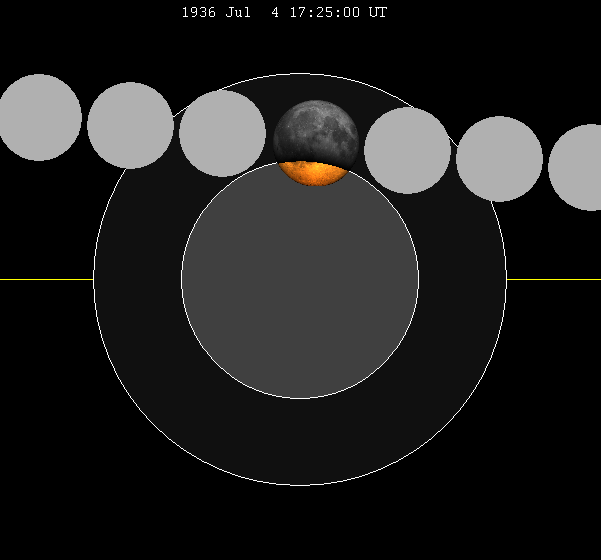
- The Moon's hourly motion shown right to left
- Date: July 4, 1936
- Gamma: 0.8642
- Magnitude: 0.2668
- Saros cycle: 138 (25 of 83)
- Partiality: 116 minutes, 18 seconds
- Penumbral: 289 minutes, 31 seconds
Contacts (UTC)
- P1: 15:00:16
- U1: 16:26:56
- Greatest: 17:25:00
- U4: 18:23:14
- P4: 19:49:46

A partial lunar eclipse occurred at the Moon’s ascending node of orbit on Saturday, July 4, 1936, with an umbral magnitude of 0.2668. A lunar eclipse occurs when the Moon moves into the Earth's shadow, causing the Moon to be darkened. A partial lunar eclipse occurs when one part of the Moon is in the Earth's umbra, while the other part is in the Earth's penumbra. Unlike a solar eclipse, which can only be viewed from a relatively small area of the world, a lunar eclipse may be viewed from anywhere on the night side of Earth. The Moon's apparent diameter was near the average diameter because it occurred 6.8 days after apogee (on June 27, 1936, at 21:30 UTC) and 7.2 days before perigee (on July 11, 1936, at 22:05 UTC).

== Visibility ==
The eclipse was completely visible over south and east Asia, Australia, and Antarctica, seen rising over Africa, Europe, and west and central Asia and setting over northeast Asia and the central Pacific Ocean.

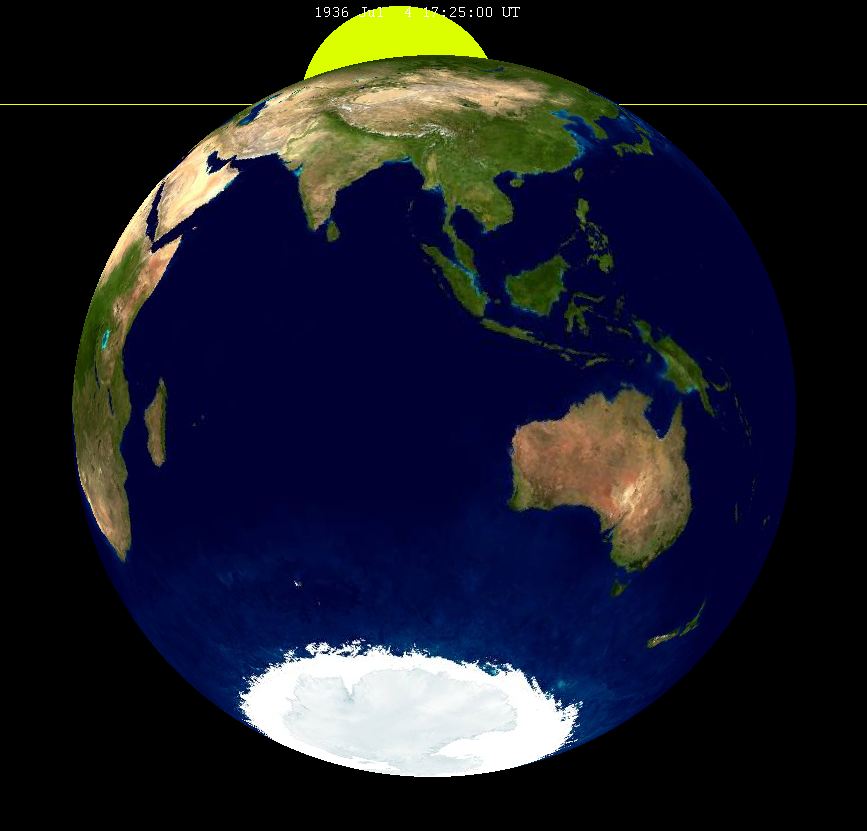
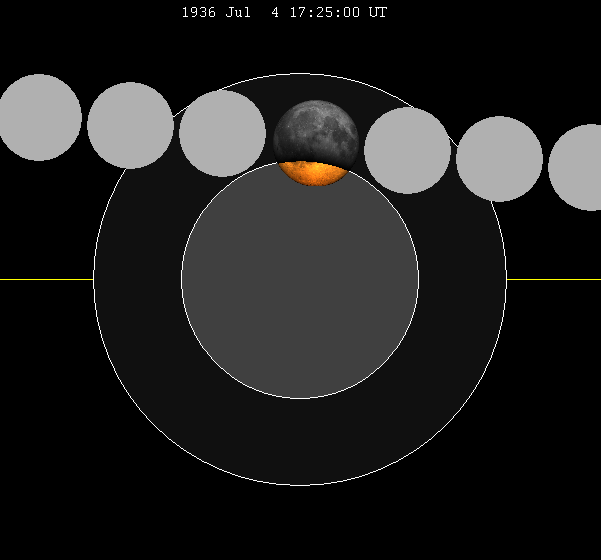

== Eclipse details ==
Shown below is a table displaying details about this particular lunar eclipse. It describes various parameters pertaining to this eclipse.

July 4, 1936 Lunar Eclipse Parameters
Parameter	Value
Penumbral Magnitude	1.27781
Umbral Magnitude	0.26679
Gamma	0.86423
Sun Right Ascension	06h54m24.6s
Sun Declination	+22°51'29.8"
Sun Semi-Diameter	15'43.8"
Sun Equatorial Horizontal Parallax	08.6"
Moon Right Ascension	18h53m44.0s
Moon Declination	-22°03'02.9"
Moon Semi-Diameter	15'33.6"
Moon Equatorial Horizontal Parallax	0°57'06.2"
ΔT	23.8 s

== Eclipse season ==
This eclipse is part of an eclipse season, a period, roughly every six months, when eclipses occur. Only two (or occasionally three) eclipse seasons occur each year, and each season lasts about 35 days and repeats just short of six months (173 days) later; thus two full eclipse seasons always occur each year. Either two or three eclipses happen each eclipse season. In the sequence below, each eclipse is separated by a fortnight.

Eclipse season of June–July 1936
June 19 Descending node (new moon)	July 4 Ascending node (full moon)
Total solar eclipse Solar Saros 126	Partial lunar eclipse Lunar Saros 138

== Related eclipses ==
=== Eclipses in 1936 ===
- A total lunar eclipse on January 8.
- A total solar eclipse on June 19.
- A partial lunar eclipse on July 4.
- An annular solar eclipse on December 13.
- A penumbral lunar eclipse on December 28.

=== Metonic ===
- Preceded by: Lunar eclipse of September 14, 1932
- Followed by: Lunar eclipse of April 22, 1940

=== Tzolkinex ===
- Preceded by: Lunar eclipse of May 23, 1929
- Followed by: Lunar eclipse of August 15, 1943

=== Half-Saros ===
- Preceded by: Solar eclipse of June 29, 1927
- Followed by: Solar eclipse of July 9, 1945

=== Tritos ===
- Preceded by: Lunar eclipse of August 4, 1925
- Followed by: Lunar eclipse of June 3, 1947

=== Lunar Saros 138 ===
- Preceded by: Lunar eclipse of June 24, 1918
- Followed by: Lunar eclipse of July 16, 1954

=== Inex ===
- Preceded by: Lunar eclipse of July 25, 1907
- Followed by: Lunar eclipse of June 14, 1965

=== Triad ===
- Preceded by: Lunar eclipse of September 2, 1849
- Followed by: Lunar eclipse of May 5, 2023

=== Lunar eclipses of 1933–1936 ===
This eclipse is a member of a semester series. An eclipse in a semester series of lunar eclipses repeats approximately every 177 days and 4 hours (a semester) at alternating nodes of the Moon's orbit.

The penumbral lunar eclipses on March 12, 1933 and September 4, 1933 occur in the previous lunar year eclipse set.

Lunar eclipse series sets from 1933 to 1936
Descending node				Ascending node			
Saros	Date Viewing	Type Chart	Gamma	Saros	Date Viewing	Type Chart	Gamma
103	1933 Feb 10	Penumbral	1.5600	108	1933 Aug 05	Penumbral	−1.4216
113	1934 Jan 30	Partial	0.9258	118	1934 Jul 26	Partial	−0.6681
123	1935 Jan 19	Total	0.2498	128	1935 Jul 16	Total	0.0672
133	1936 Jan 08	Total	−0.4429	138	1936 Jul 04	Partial	0.8642
143	1936 Dec 28	Penumbral	−1.0971				

=== Saros 138 ===
This eclipse is a part of Saros series 138, repeating every 18 years, 11 days, and containing 82 events. The series started with a penumbral lunar eclipse on October 15, 1521. It contains partial eclipses from June 24, 1918 through August 28, 2026; total eclipses from September 7, 2044 through June 8, 2495; and a second set of partial eclipses from June 19, 2513 through August 13, 2603. The series ends at member 82 as a penumbral eclipse on March 30, 2982.

The longest duration of totality will be produced by member 48 at 105 minutes, 24 seconds on March 24, 2369. All eclipses in this series occur at the Moon’s ascending node of orbit.

Greatest	First			
The greatest eclipse of the series will occur on 2369 Mar 24, lasting 105 minutes, 24 seconds.	Penumbral	Partial	Total	Central
The greatest eclipse of the series will occur on 2369 Mar 24, lasting 105 minutes, 24 seconds.	1521 Oct 15	1918 Jun 24	2044 Sep 07	2116 Oct 21
The greatest eclipse of the series will occur on 2369 Mar 24, lasting 105 minutes, 24 seconds.	Last			
The greatest eclipse of the series will occur on 2369 Mar 24, lasting 105 minutes, 24 seconds.	Central	Total	Partial	Penumbral
The greatest eclipse of the series will occur on 2369 Mar 24, lasting 105 minutes, 24 seconds.	2441 May 06	2495 Jun 08	2603 Aug 13	2982 Mar 30

Eclipses are tabulated in three columns; every third eclipse in the same column is one exeligmos apart, so they all cast shadows over approximately the same parts of the Earth.

Series members 17–38 occur between 1801 and 2200:
17	18	19
1810 Apr 19	1828 Apr 29	1846 May 11
20	21	22
1864 May 21	1882 Jun 01	1900 Jun 13
23	24	25
1918 Jun 24	1936 Jul 04	1954 Jul 16
26	27	28
1972 Jul 26	1990 Aug 06	2008 Aug 16
29	30	31
2026 Aug 28	2044 Sep 07	2062 Sep 18
32	33	34
2080 Sep 29	2098 Oct 10	2116 Oct 21
35	36	37
2134 Nov 02	2152 Nov 12	2170 Nov 23
38
2188 Dec 04

=== Tritos series ===
This eclipse is a part of a tritos cycle, repeating at alternating nodes every 135 synodic months (≈ 3986.63 days, or 11 years minus 1 month). Their appearance and longitude are irregular due to a lack of synchronization with the anomalistic month (period of perigee), but groupings of 3 tritos cycles (≈ 33 years minus 3 months) come close (≈ 434.044 anomalistic months), so eclipses are similar in these groupings.

Series members between 1801 and 2132
1805 Jul 11 (Saros 126)	1816 Jun 10 (Saros 127)	1827 May 11 (Saros 128)	1838 Apr 10 (Saros 129)	1849 Mar 09 (Saros 130)
1860 Feb 07 (Saros 131)	1871 Jan 06 (Saros 132)	1881 Dec 05 (Saros 133)	1892 Nov 04 (Saros 134)	1903 Oct 06 (Saros 135)
1914 Sep 04 (Saros 136)	1925 Aug 04 (Saros 137)	1936 Jul 04 (Saros 138)	1947 Jun 03 (Saros 139)	1958 May 03 (Saros 140)
1969 Apr 02 (Saros 141)	1980 Mar 01 (Saros 142)	1991 Jan 30 (Saros 143)	2001 Dec 30 (Saros 144)	2012 Nov 28 (Saros 145)
2023 Oct 28 (Saros 146)	2034 Sep 28 (Saros 147)	2045 Aug 27 (Saros 148)	2056 Jul 26 (Saros 149)	2067 Jun 27 (Saros 150)
2132 Dec 22 (Saros 156)

=== Inex series ===
This eclipse is a part of the long period inex cycle, repeating at alternating nodes, every 358 synodic months (≈ 10,571.95 days, or 29 years minus 20 days). Their appearance and longitude are irregular due to a lack of synchronization with the anomalistic month (period of perigee). However, groupings of 3 inex cycles (≈ 87 years minus 2 months) comes close (≈ 1,151.02 anomalistic months), so eclipses are similar in these groupings.

Series members between 1801 and 2200
1820 Sep 22 (Saros 134)	1849 Sep 02 (Saros 135)	1878 Aug 13 (Saros 136)
1907 Jul 25 (Saros 137)	1936 Jul 04 (Saros 138)	1965 Jun 14 (Saros 139)
1994 May 25 (Saros 140)	2023 May 05 (Saros 141)	2052 Apr 14 (Saros 142)
2081 Mar 25 (Saros 143)	2110 Mar 06 (Saros 144)	2139 Feb 13 (Saros 145)
2168 Jan 24 (Saros 146)	2197 Jan 04 (Saros 147)	

=== Half-Saros cycle ===
A lunar eclipse will be preceded and followed by solar eclipses by 9 years and 5.5 days (a half saros). This lunar eclipse is related to two total solar eclipses of Solar Saros 145.

June 29, 1927	July 9, 1945

== See also ==
- List of lunar eclipses
- List of 20th-century lunar eclipses
