= August 1990 lunar eclipse =

Partial lunar eclipse on August 6, 1990

- Partial eclipse
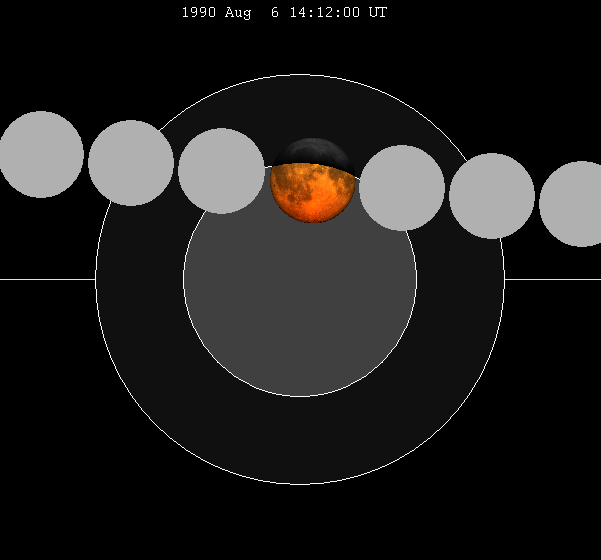
- The Moon's hourly motion shown right to left
- Date: August 6, 1990
- Gamma: 0.6374
- Magnitude: 0.6766
- Saros cycle: 138 (28 of 83)
- Partiality: 175 minutes, 31 seconds
- Penumbral: 322 minutes, 2 seconds
Contacts (UTC)
- P1: 11:31:17
- U1: 12:44:36
- Greatest: 14:12:18
- U4: 15:40:08
- P4: 16:53:19

A partial lunar eclipse occurred at the Moon’s ascending node of orbit on Monday, August 6, 1990, with an umbral magnitude of 0.6766. A lunar eclipse occurs when the Moon moves into the Earth's shadow, causing the Moon to be darkened. A partial lunar eclipse occurs when one part of the Moon is in the Earth's umbra, while the other part is in the Earth's penumbra. Unlike a solar eclipse, which can only be viewed from a relatively small area of the world, a lunar eclipse may be viewed from anywhere on the night side of Earth. Occurring about 6.2 days after apogee (on July 31, 1990, at 9:20 UTC), the Moon's apparent diameter was smaller.

== Visibility ==
The eclipse was completely visible over east Asia, Australia, and Antarctica, seen rising over much of Asia and east Africa and setting over western North America and the eastern Pacific Ocean.

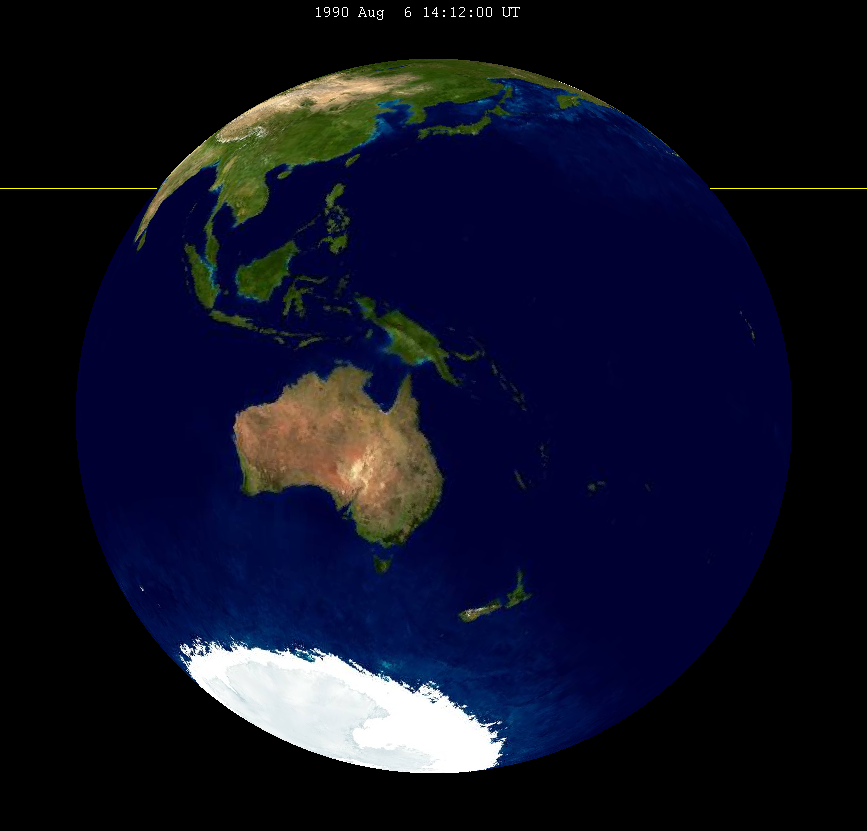
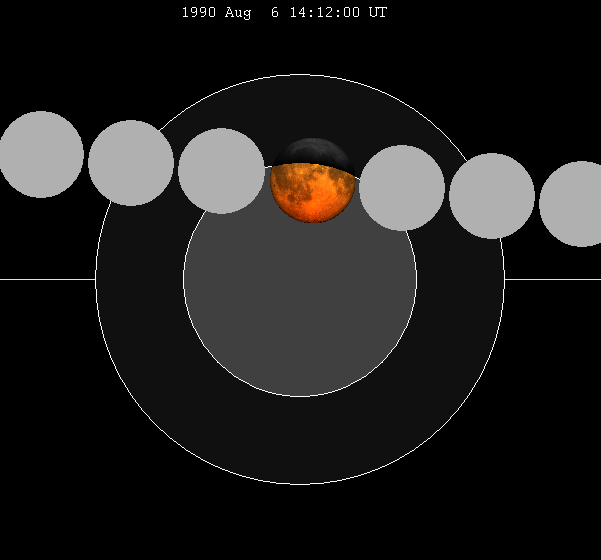

== Eclipse details ==
Shown below is a table displaying details about this particular solar eclipse. It describes various parameters pertaining to this eclipse.

August 6, 1990 Lunar Eclipse Parameters
Parameter	Value
Penumbral Magnitude	1.70047
Umbral Magnitude	0.67658
Gamma	0.63741
Sun Right Ascension	09h05m18.6s
Sun Declination	+16°40'08.3"
Sun Semi-Diameter	15'46.2"
Sun Equatorial Horizontal Parallax	08.7"
Moon Right Ascension	21h04m21.5s
Moon Declination	-16°06'49.0"
Moon Semi-Diameter	15'24.1"
Moon Equatorial Horizontal Parallax	0°56'31.6"
ΔT	57.3 s

== Eclipse season ==
This eclipse is part of an eclipse season, a period, roughly every six months, when eclipses occur. Only two (or occasionally three) eclipse seasons occur each year, and each season lasts about 35 days and repeats just short of six months (173 days) later; thus two full eclipse seasons always occur each year. Either two or three eclipses happen each eclipse season. In the sequence below, each eclipse is separated by a fortnight.

Eclipse season of July–August 1990
July 22 Descending node (new moon)	August 6 Ascending node (full moon)
Total solar eclipse Solar Saros 126	Partial lunar eclipse Lunar Saros 138

== Related eclipses ==
=== Eclipses in 1990 ===
- An annular solar eclipse on January 26.
- A total lunar eclipse on February 9.
- A total solar eclipse on July 22.
- A partial lunar eclipse on August 6.

=== Metonic ===
- Preceded by: Lunar eclipse of October 17, 1986
- Followed by: Lunar eclipse of May 25, 1994

=== Tzolkinex ===
- Preceded by: Lunar eclipse of June 25, 1983
- Followed by: Lunar eclipse of September 16, 1997

=== Half-Saros ===
- Preceded by: Solar eclipse of July 31, 1981
- Followed by: Solar eclipse of August 11, 1999

=== Tritos ===
- Preceded by: Lunar eclipse of September 6, 1979
- Followed by: Lunar eclipse of July 5, 2001

=== Lunar Saros 138 ===
- Preceded by: Lunar eclipse of July 26, 1972
- Followed by: Lunar eclipse of August 16, 2008

=== Inex ===
- Preceded by: Lunar eclipse of August 26, 1961
- Followed by: Lunar eclipse of July 16, 2019

=== Triad ===
- Preceded by: Lunar eclipse of October 6, 1903
- Followed by: Lunar eclipse of June 6, 2077

=== Lunar eclipses of 1988–1991 ===
This eclipse is a member of a semester series. An eclipse in a semester series of lunar eclipses repeats approximately every 177 days and 4 hours (a semester) at alternating nodes of the Moon's orbit.

The lunar eclipses on June 27, 1991 (penumbral) and December 21, 1991 (partial) occur in the next lunar year eclipse set.

Lunar eclipse series sets from 1988 to 1991
Descending node				Ascending node			
Saros	Date Viewing	Type Chart	Gamma	Saros	Date Viewing	Type Chart	Gamma
113	1988 Mar 03	Penumbral	0.9886	118	1988 Aug 27	Partial	−0.8682
123	1989 Feb 20	Total	0.2935	128	1989 Aug 17	Total	−0.1491
133	1990 Feb 09	Total	−0.4148	138	1990 Aug 06	Partial	0.6374
143	1991 Jan 30	Penumbral	−1.0752	148	1991 Jul 26	Penumbral	1.4370

=== Saros 138 ===
This eclipse is a part of Saros series 138, repeating every 18 years, 11 days, and containing 82 events. The series started with a penumbral lunar eclipse on October 15, 1521. It contains partial eclipses from June 24, 1918 through August 28, 2026; total eclipses from September 7, 2044 through June 8, 2495; and a second set of partial eclipses from June 19, 2513 through August 13, 2603. The series ends at member 82 as a penumbral eclipse on March 30, 2982.

The longest duration of totality will be produced by member 48 at 105 minutes, 24 seconds on March 24, 2369. All eclipses in this series occur at the Moon’s ascending node of orbit.

Greatest	First			
The greatest eclipse of the series will occur on 2369 Mar 24, lasting 105 minutes, 24 seconds.	Penumbral	Partial	Total	Central
The greatest eclipse of the series will occur on 2369 Mar 24, lasting 105 minutes, 24 seconds.	1521 Oct 15	1918 Jun 24	2044 Sep 07	2116 Oct 21
The greatest eclipse of the series will occur on 2369 Mar 24, lasting 105 minutes, 24 seconds.	Last			
The greatest eclipse of the series will occur on 2369 Mar 24, lasting 105 minutes, 24 seconds.	Central	Total	Partial	Penumbral
The greatest eclipse of the series will occur on 2369 Mar 24, lasting 105 minutes, 24 seconds.	2441 May 06	2495 Jun 08	2603 Aug 13	2982 Mar 30

Eclipses are tabulated in three columns; every third eclipse in the same column is one exeligmos apart, so they all cast shadows over approximately the same parts of the Earth.

Series members 17–38 occur between 1801 and 2200:
17	18	19
1810 Apr 19	1828 Apr 29	1846 May 11
20	21	22
1864 May 21	1882 Jun 01	1900 Jun 13
23	24	25
1918 Jun 24	1936 Jul 04	1954 Jul 16
26	27	28
1972 Jul 26	1990 Aug 06	2008 Aug 16
29	30	31
2026 Aug 28	2044 Sep 07	2062 Sep 18
32	33	34
2080 Sep 29	2098 Oct 10	2116 Oct 21
35	36	37
2134 Nov 02	2152 Nov 12	2170 Nov 23
38
2188 Dec 04

=== Tritos series ===
This eclipse is a part of a tritos cycle, repeating at alternating nodes every 135 synodic months (≈ 3986.63 days, or 11 years minus 1 month). Their appearance and longitude are irregular due to a lack of synchronization with the anomalistic month (period of perigee), but groupings of 3 tritos cycles (≈ 33 years minus 3 months) come close (≈ 434.044 anomalistic months), so eclipses are similar in these groupings.

Series members between 1801 and 2187
1805 Jan 15 (Saros 121)	1815 Dec 16 (Saros 122)	1826 Nov 14 (Saros 123)	1837 Oct 13 (Saros 124)	1848 Sep 13 (Saros 125)
1859 Aug 13 (Saros 126)	1870 Jul 12 (Saros 127)	1881 Jun 12 (Saros 128)	1892 May 11 (Saros 129)	1903 Apr 12 (Saros 130)
1914 Mar 12 (Saros 131)	1925 Feb 08 (Saros 132)	1936 Jan 08 (Saros 133)	1946 Dec 08 (Saros 134)	1957 Nov 07 (Saros 135)
1968 Oct 06 (Saros 136)	1979 Sep 06 (Saros 137)	1990 Aug 06 (Saros 138)	2001 Jul 05 (Saros 139)	2012 Jun 04 (Saros 140)
2023 May 05 (Saros 141)	2034 Apr 03 (Saros 142)	2045 Mar 03 (Saros 143)	2056 Feb 01 (Saros 144)	2066 Dec 31 (Saros 145)
2077 Nov 29 (Saros 146)	2088 Oct 30 (Saros 147)	2099 Sep 29 (Saros 148)	2110 Aug 29 (Saros 149)	2121 Jul 30 (Saros 150)
2132 Jun 28 (Saros 151)	2143 May 28 (Saros 152)	2154 Apr 28 (Saros 153)		
2187 Jan 24 (Saros 156)

=== Inex series ===
This eclipse is a part of the long period inex cycle, repeating at alternating nodes, every 358 synodic months (≈ 10,571.95 days, or 29 years minus 20 days). Their appearance and longitude are irregular due to a lack of synchronization with the anomalistic month (period of perigee). However, groupings of 3 inex cycles (≈ 87 years minus 2 months) comes close (≈ 1,151.02 anomalistic months), so eclipses are similar in these groupings.

Series members between 1801 and 2200
1816 Dec 04 (Saros 132)	1845 Nov 14 (Saros 133)	1874 Oct 25 (Saros 134)
1903 Oct 06 (Saros 135)	1932 Sep 14 (Saros 136)	1961 Aug 26 (Saros 137)
1990 Aug 06 (Saros 138)	2019 Jul 16 (Saros 139)	2048 Jun 26 (Saros 140)
2077 Jun 06 (Saros 141)	2106 May 17 (Saros 142)	2135 Apr 28 (Saros 143)
2164 Apr 07 (Saros 144)	2193 Mar 17 (Saros 145)	

=== Half-Saros cycle ===
A lunar eclipse will be preceded and followed by solar eclipses by 9 years and 5.5 days (a half saros). This lunar eclipse is related to two total solar eclipses of Solar Saros 145.

July 31, 1981	August 11, 1999

== See also ==
- List of lunar eclipses
- List of 20th-century lunar eclipses
