= 2026 eclipse =

2026 eclipse may refer to several eclipses:

== Lunar ==
- March 2026 lunar eclipse
- August 2026 lunar eclipse

== Solar ==
- Solar eclipse of February 17, 2026
- Solar eclipse of August 12, 2026
