= July 1972 lunar eclipse =

Partial lunar eclipse July 26, 1972

- Partial eclipse
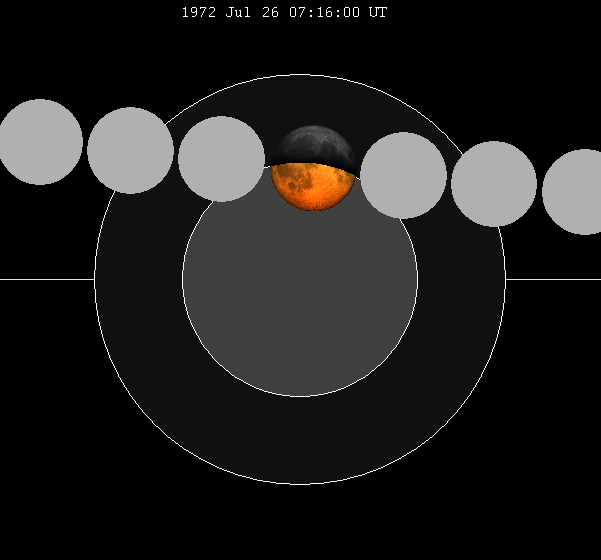
- The Moon's hourly motion shown right to left
- Date: July 26, 1972
- Gamma: 0.7117
- Magnitude: 0.5427
- Saros cycle: 138 (27 of 83)
- Partiality: 160 minutes, 8 seconds
- Penumbral: 312 minutes, 27 seconds
Contacts (UTC)
- P1: 4:39:26
- U1: 5:55:39
- Greatest: 7:15:39
- U4: 8:35:47
- P4: 9:51:52

A partial lunar eclipse occurred at the Moon's ascending node of orbit on Wednesday, July 26, 1972, with an umbral magnitude of 0.5427. A lunar eclipse occurs when the Moon moves into the Earth's shadow, causing the Moon to be darkened. A partial lunar eclipse occurs when one part of the Moon is in the Earth's umbra, while the other part is in the Earth's penumbra. Unlike a solar eclipse, which can only be viewed from a relatively small area of the world, a lunar eclipse may be viewed from anywhere on the night side of Earth. Occurring about 6.4 days after apogee (on July 19, 1972, at 21:20 UTC), the Moon's apparent diameter was smaller.

== Visibility ==
The eclipse was completely visible over much of North and South America and Antarctica, seen rising over Australia, northwestern North America, and the central Pacific Ocean and setting over northeastern North America, west Africa, and the Atlantic Ocean.

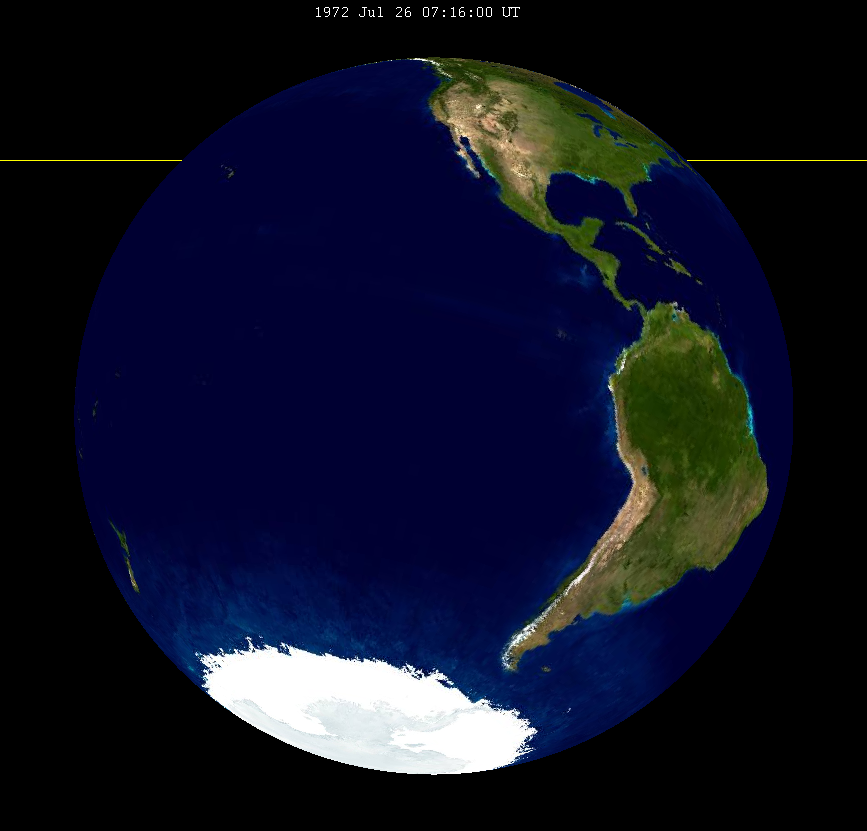
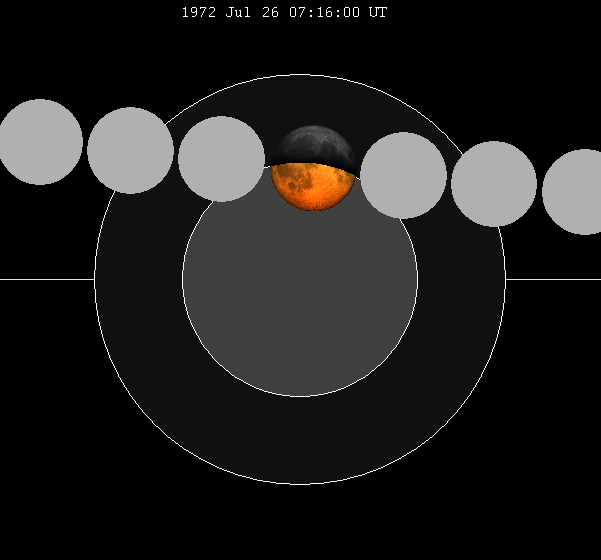

== Eclipse details ==
Shown below is a table displaying details about this particular solar eclipse. It describes various parameters pertaining to this eclipse.

July 26, 1972 Lunar Eclipse Parameters
Parameter	Value
Penumbral Magnitude	1.56180
Umbral Magnitude	0.54271
Gamma	0.71167
Sun Right Ascension	08h22m46.8s
Sun Declination	+19°24'04.5"
Sun Semi-Diameter	15'44.9"
Sun Equatorial Horizontal Parallax	08.7"
Moon Right Ascension	20h21m51.2s
Moon Declination	-18°45'55.3"
Moon Semi-Diameter	15'27.2"
Moon Equatorial Horizontal Parallax	0°56'42.9"
ΔT	42.8 s

== Eclipse season ==
This eclipse is part of an eclipse season, a period, roughly every six months, when eclipses occur. Only two (or occasionally three) eclipse seasons occur each year, and each season lasts about 35 days and repeats just short of six months (173 days) later; thus two full eclipse seasons always occur each year. Either two or three eclipses happen each eclipse season. In the sequence below, each eclipse is separated by a fortnight.

Eclipse season of July 1972
July 10 Descending node (new moon)	July 26 Ascending node (full moon)
Total solar eclipse Solar Saros 126	Partial lunar eclipse Lunar Saros 138

== Related eclipses ==
=== Eclipses in 1972 ===
- An annular solar eclipse on January 16.
- A total lunar eclipse on January 30.
- A total solar eclipse on July 10.
- A partial lunar eclipse on July 26.

=== Metonic ===
- Preceded by: Lunar eclipse of October 6, 1968
- Followed by: Lunar eclipse of May 13, 1976

=== Tzolkinex ===
- Preceded by: Lunar eclipse of June 14, 1965
- Followed by: Lunar eclipse of September 6, 1979

=== Half-Saros ===
- Preceded by: Solar eclipse of July 20, 1963
- Followed by: Solar eclipse of July 31, 1981

=== Tritos ===
- Preceded by: Lunar eclipse of August 26, 1961
- Followed by: Lunar eclipse of June 25, 1983

=== Lunar Saros 138 ===
- Preceded by: Lunar eclipse of July 16, 1954
- Followed by: Lunar eclipse of August 6, 1990

=== Inex ===
- Preceded by: Lunar eclipse of August 15, 1943
- Followed by: Lunar eclipse of July 5, 2001

=== Triad ===
- Preceded by: Lunar eclipse of September 24, 1885
- Followed by: Lunar eclipse of May 27, 2059

=== Lunar eclipses of 1969–1973 ===
This eclipse is a member of a semester series. An eclipse in a semester series of lunar eclipses repeats approximately every 177 days and 4 hours (a semester) at alternating nodes of the Moon's orbit.

The penumbral lunar eclipses on April 2, 1969 and September 25, 1969 occur in the previous lunar year eclipse set, and the lunar eclipses on June 15, 1973 (penumbral) and December 10, 1973 (partial) occur in the next lunar year eclipse set.

Lunar eclipse series sets from 1969 to 1973
Ascending node				Descending node			
Saros	Date Viewing	Type Chart	Gamma	Saros	Date Viewing	Type Chart	Gamma
108	1969 Aug 27	Penumbral	−1.5407	113	1970 Feb 21	Partial	0.9620
118	1970 Aug 17	Partial	−0.8053	123	1971 Feb 10	Total	0.2741
128	1971 Aug 06	Total	−0.0794	133	1972 Jan 30	Total	−0.4273
138	1972 Jul 26	Partial	0.7117	143	1973 Jan 18	Penumbral	−1.0845
148	1973 Jul 15	Penumbral	1.5178				

=== Saros 138 ===
This eclipse is a part of Saros series 138, repeating every 18 years, 11 days, and containing 82 events. The series started with a penumbral lunar eclipse on October 15, 1521. It contains partial eclipses from June 24, 1918 through August 28, 2026; total eclipses from September 7, 2044 through June 8, 2495; and a second set of partial eclipses from June 19, 2513 through August 13, 2603. The series ends at member 82 as a penumbral eclipse on March 30, 2982.

The longest duration of totality will be produced by member 48 at 105 minutes, 24 seconds on March 24, 2369. All eclipses in this series occur at the Moon’s ascending node of orbit.

Greatest	First			
The greatest eclipse of the series will occur on 2369 Mar 24, lasting 105 minutes, 24 seconds.	Penumbral	Partial	Total	Central
The greatest eclipse of the series will occur on 2369 Mar 24, lasting 105 minutes, 24 seconds.	1521 Oct 15	1918 Jun 24	2044 Sep 07	2116 Oct 21
The greatest eclipse of the series will occur on 2369 Mar 24, lasting 105 minutes, 24 seconds.	Last			
The greatest eclipse of the series will occur on 2369 Mar 24, lasting 105 minutes, 24 seconds.	Central	Total	Partial	Penumbral
The greatest eclipse of the series will occur on 2369 Mar 24, lasting 105 minutes, 24 seconds.	2441 May 06	2495 Jun 08	2603 Aug 13	2982 Mar 30

Eclipses are tabulated in three columns; every third eclipse in the same column is one exeligmos apart, so they all cast shadows over approximately the same parts of the Earth.

Series members 17–38 occur between 1801 and 2200:
17	18	19
1810 Apr 19	1828 Apr 29	1846 May 11
20	21	22
1864 May 21	1882 Jun 01	1900 Jun 13
23	24	25
1918 Jun 24	1936 Jul 04	1954 Jul 16
26	27	28
1972 Jul 26	1990 Aug 06	2008 Aug 16
29	30	31
2026 Aug 28	2044 Sep 07	2062 Sep 18
32	33	34
2080 Sep 29	2098 Oct 10	2116 Oct 21
35	36	37
2134 Nov 02	2152 Nov 12	2170 Nov 23
38
2188 Dec 04

=== Tritos series ===
This eclipse is a part of a tritos cycle, repeating at alternating nodes every 135 synodic months (≈ 3986.63 days, or 11 years minus 1 month). Their appearance and longitude are irregular due to a lack of synchronization with the anomalistic month (period of perigee), but groupings of 3 tritos cycles (≈ 33 years minus 3 months) come close (≈ 434.044 anomalistic months), so eclipses are similar in these groupings.

Series members between 1801 and 2200
1808 Nov 03 (Saros 123)	1819 Oct 03 (Saros 124)	1830 Sep 02 (Saros 125)	1841 Aug 02 (Saros 126)	1852 Jul 01 (Saros 127)
1863 Jun 01 (Saros 128)	1874 May 01 (Saros 129)	1885 Mar 30 (Saros 130)	1896 Feb 28 (Saros 131)	1907 Jan 29 (Saros 132)
1917 Dec 28 (Saros 133)	1928 Nov 27 (Saros 134)	1939 Oct 28 (Saros 135)	1950 Sep 26 (Saros 136)	1961 Aug 26 (Saros 137)
1972 Jul 26 (Saros 138)	1983 Jun 25 (Saros 139)	1994 May 25 (Saros 140)	2005 Apr 24 (Saros 141)	2016 Mar 23 (Saros 142)
2027 Feb 20 (Saros 143)	2038 Jan 21 (Saros 144)	2048 Dec 20 (Saros 145)	2059 Nov 19 (Saros 146)	2070 Oct 19 (Saros 147)
2081 Sep 18 (Saros 148)	2092 Aug 17 (Saros 149)	2103 Jul 19 (Saros 150)	2114 Jun 18 (Saros 151)	2125 May 17 (Saros 152)
2136 Apr 16 (Saros 153)			2169 Jan 13 (Saros 156)	
2190 Nov 12 (Saros 158)

=== Inex series ===
This eclipse is a part of the long period inex cycle, repeating at alternating nodes, every 358 synodic months (≈ 10,571.95 days, or 29 years minus 20 days). Their appearance and longitude are irregular due to a lack of synchronization with the anomalistic month (period of perigee). However, groupings of 3 inex cycles (≈ 87 years minus 2 months) comes close (≈ 1,151.02 anomalistic months), so eclipses are similar in these groupings.

Series members between 1801 and 2200
1827 Nov 03 (Saros 133)	1856 Oct 13 (Saros 134)	1885 Sep 24 (Saros 135)
1914 Sep 04 (Saros 136)	1943 Aug 15 (Saros 137)	1972 Jul 26 (Saros 138)
2001 Jul 05 (Saros 139)	2030 Jun 15 (Saros 140)	2059 May 27 (Saros 141)
2088 May 05 (Saros 142)	2117 Apr 16 (Saros 143)	2146 Mar 28 (Saros 144)
2175 Mar 07 (Saros 145)

=== Half-Saros cycle ===
A lunar eclipse will be preceded and followed by solar eclipses by 9 years and 5.5 days (a half saros). This lunar eclipse is related to two total solar eclipses of Solar Saros 145.

July 20, 1963	July 31, 1981

== See also ==
- List of lunar eclipses
- List of 20th-century lunar eclipses
