= September 2044 lunar eclipse =

Astronomical event

- Total eclipse
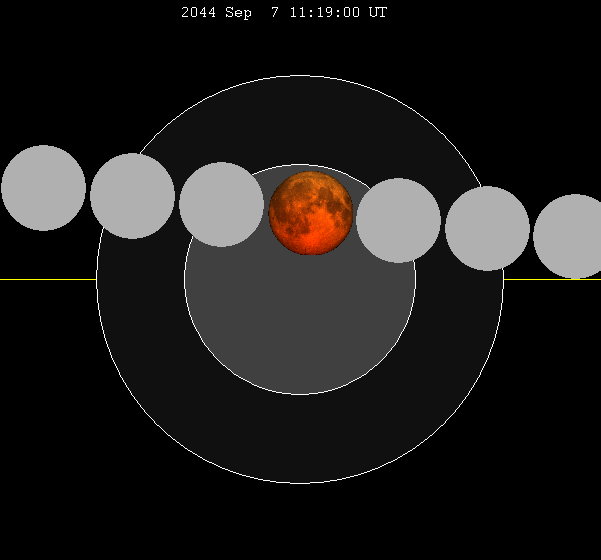
- The Moon's hourly motion shown right to left
- Date: September 7, 2044
- Gamma: 0.4318
- Magnitude: 1.0456
- Saros cycle: 138 (30 of 82)
- Totality: 33 minutes, 54 seconds
- Partiality: 206 minutes, 12 seconds
- Penumbral: 344 minutes, 1 second
Contacts (UTC)
- P1: 8:27:14
- U1: 9:36:12
- U2: 11:02:21
- Greatest: 11:19:16
- U3: 11:36:15
- U4: 13:02:24
- P4: 14:11:15

A total lunar eclipse will occur at the Moon's ascending node of orbit on Wednesday, September 7, 2044, with an umbral magnitude of 1.0456. A lunar eclipse occurs when the Moon moves into the Earth's shadow, causing the Moon to be darkened. A total lunar eclipse occurs when the Moon's near side entirely passes into the Earth's umbral shadow. Unlike a solar eclipse, which can only be viewed from a relatively small area of the world, a lunar eclipse may be viewed from anywhere on the night side of Earth. A total lunar eclipse can last up to nearly two hours, while a total solar eclipse lasts only a few minutes at any given place, because the Moon's shadow is smaller. Occurring about 5.8 days after apogee (on September 1, 2044, at 16:30 UTC), the Moon's apparent diameter will be smaller.

This lunar eclipse is the last of a tetrad, with four total lunar eclipses in series, the others being on March 25, 2043; September 19, 2043; and March 13, 2044.

This eclipse will also be the first total eclipse of Lunar Saros 138.

== Visibility ==
The eclipse will be completely visible over eastern Australia, northeast Asia, and northwestern North America, seen rising over much of Asia and western Australia and setting over much of North and South America.

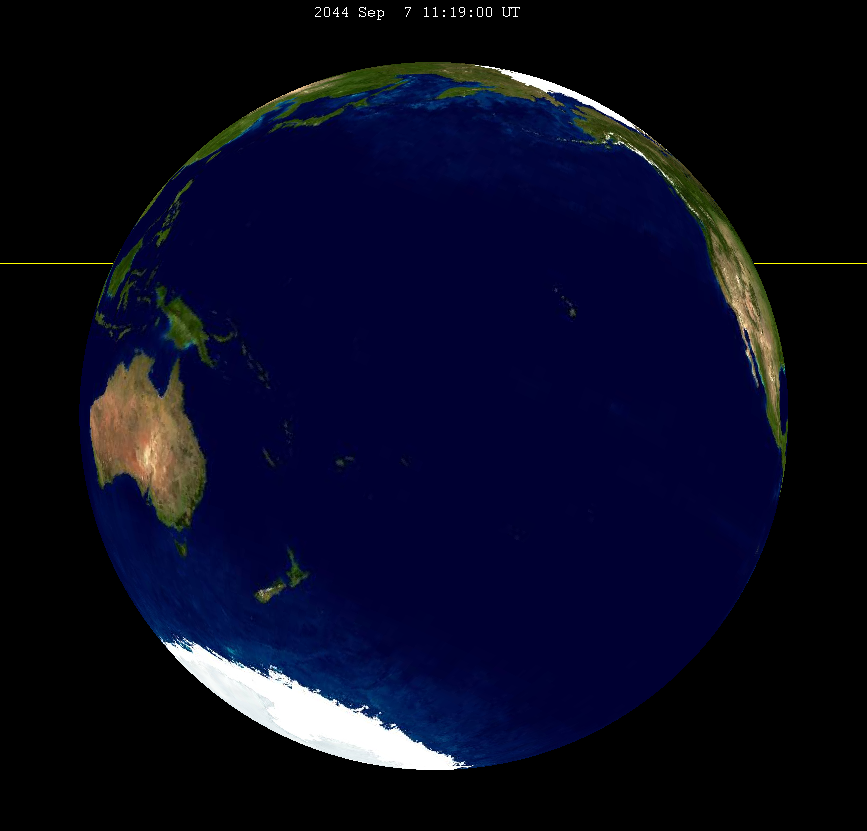
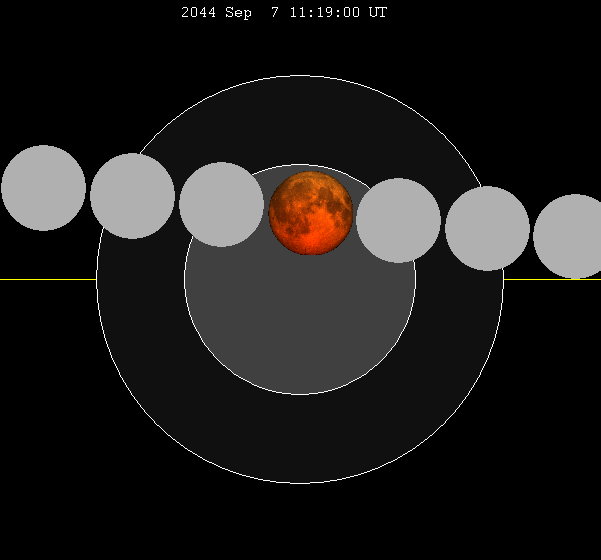

== Eclipse details ==
Shown below is a table displaying details about this particular solar eclipse. It describes various parameters pertaining to this eclipse.

September 7, 2044 Lunar Eclipse Parameters
Parameter	Value
Penumbral Magnitude	2.08792
Umbral Magnitude	1.04756
Gamma	0.43184
Sun Right Ascension	11h06m33.5s
Sun Declination	+05°43'12.4"
Sun Semi-Diameter	15'52.4"
Sun Equatorial Horizontal Parallax	08.7"
Moon Right Ascension	23h05m47.2s
Moon Declination	-05°21'56.9"
Moon Semi-Diameter	15'15.4"
Moon Equatorial Horizontal Parallax	0°55'59.6"
ΔT	81.8 s

== Eclipse season ==
This eclipse is part of an eclipse season, a period, roughly every six months, when eclipses occur. Only two (or occasionally three) eclipse seasons occur each year, and each season lasts about 35 days and repeats just short of six months (173 days) later; thus two full eclipse seasons always occur each year. Either two or three eclipses happen each eclipse season. In the sequence below, each eclipse is separated by a fortnight.

Eclipse season of August–September 2044
August 23 Descending node (new moon)	September 7 Ascending node (full moon)
Total solar eclipse Solar Saros 126	Total lunar eclipse Lunar Saros 138

== Related eclipses ==
=== Eclipses in 2044 ===
- An annular solar eclipse on February 28.
- A total lunar eclipse on March 13.
- A total solar eclipse on August 23.
- A total lunar eclipse on September 7.

=== Metonic ===
- Preceded by: Lunar eclipse of November 18, 2040
- Followed by: Lunar eclipse of June 26, 2048

=== Tzolkinex ===
- Preceded by: Lunar eclipse of July 27, 2037
- Followed by: Lunar eclipse of October 19, 2051

=== Half-Saros ===
- Preceded by: Solar eclipse of September 2, 2035
- Followed by: Solar eclipse of September 12, 2053

=== Tritos ===
- Preceded by: Lunar eclipse of October 8, 2033
- Followed by: Lunar eclipse of August 7, 2055

=== Lunar Saros 138 ===
- Preceded by: Lunar eclipse of August 28, 2026
- Followed by: Lunar eclipse of September 18, 2062

=== Inex ===
- Preceded by: Lunar eclipse of September 28, 2015
- Followed by: Lunar eclipse of August 17, 2073

=== Triad ===
- Preceded by: Lunar eclipse of November 7, 1957
- Followed by: Lunar eclipse of July 10, 2131

=== Lunar eclipses of 2042–2045 ===
This eclipse is a member of a semester series. An eclipse in a semester series of lunar eclipses repeats approximately every 177 days and 4 hours (a semester) at alternating nodes of the Moon's orbit.

The penumbral lunar eclipse on October 28, 2042 occurs in the previous lunar year eclipse set.

Lunar eclipse series sets from 2042 to 2045
Descending node				Ascending node			
Saros	Date Viewing	Type Chart	Gamma	Saros	Date Viewing	Type Chart	Gamma
113	2042 Apr 05	Penumbral	1.1080	118	2042 Sep 29	Penumbral	−1.0261
123	2043 Mar 25	Total	0.3849	128	2043 Sep 19	Total	−0.3316
133	2044 Mar 13	Total	−0.3496	138	2044 Sep 07	Total	0.4318
143	2045 Mar 03	Penumbral	−1.0274	148	2045 Aug 27	Penumbral	1.2060

=== Metonic series ===
The Metonic cycle repeats nearly exactly every 19 years and represents a Saros cycle plus one lunar year. Because it occurs on the same calendar date, the Earth's shadow will in nearly the same location relative to the background stars.

1. 2006 Mar 14.99 - penumbral (113); 2. 2025 Mar 14.29 - total (123); 3. 2044 Mar 13.82 - total (133); 4. 2063 Mar 14.67- partial (143)	1. 2006 Sep 07.79 - partial (118); 2. 2025 Sep 07.76 - total (128); 3. 2044 Sep 07.47 - partial (138); 4. 2063 Sep 07.86 - penumbral (148)

=== Saros 138 ===
This eclipse is a part of Saros series 138, repeating every 18 years, 11 days, and containing 82 events. The series started with a penumbral lunar eclipse on October 15, 1521. It contains partial eclipses from June 24, 1918 through August 28, 2026; total eclipses from September 7, 2044 through June 8, 2495; and a second set of partial eclipses from June 19, 2513 through August 13, 2603. The series ends at member 82 as a penumbral eclipse on March 30, 2982.

The longest duration of totality will be produced by member 48 at 105 minutes, 24 seconds on March 24, 2369. All eclipses in this series occur at the Moon’s ascending node of orbit.

Greatest	First			
The greatest eclipse of the series will occur on 2369 Mar 24, lasting 105 minutes, 24 seconds.	Penumbral	Partial	Total	Central
The greatest eclipse of the series will occur on 2369 Mar 24, lasting 105 minutes, 24 seconds.	1521 Oct 15	1918 Jun 24	2044 Sep 07	2116 Oct 21
The greatest eclipse of the series will occur on 2369 Mar 24, lasting 105 minutes, 24 seconds.	Last			
The greatest eclipse of the series will occur on 2369 Mar 24, lasting 105 minutes, 24 seconds.	Central	Total	Partial	Penumbral
The greatest eclipse of the series will occur on 2369 Mar 24, lasting 105 minutes, 24 seconds.	2441 May 06	2495 Jun 08	2603 Aug 13	2982 Mar 30

Eclipses are tabulated in three columns; every third eclipse in the same column is one exeligmos apart, so they all cast shadows over approximately the same parts of the Earth.

Series members 17–38 occur between 1801 and 2200:
17	18	19
1810 Apr 19	1828 Apr 29	1846 May 11
20	21	22
1864 May 21	1882 Jun 01	1900 Jun 13
23	24	25
1918 Jun 24	1936 Jul 04	1954 Jul 16
26	27	28
1972 Jul 26	1990 Aug 06	2008 Aug 16
29	30	31
2026 Aug 28	2044 Sep 07	2062 Sep 18
32	33	34
2080 Sep 29	2098 Oct 10	2116 Oct 21
35	36	37
2134 Nov 02	2152 Nov 12	2170 Nov 23
38
2188 Dec 04

=== Tritos series ===
This eclipse is a part of a tritos cycle, repeating at alternating nodes every 135 synodic months (≈ 3986.63 days, or 11 years minus 1 month). Their appearance and longitude are irregular due to a lack of synchronization with the anomalistic month (period of perigee), but groupings of 3 tritos cycles (≈ 33 years minus 3 months) come close (≈ 434.044 anomalistic months), so eclipses are similar in these groupings.

Series members between 1801 and 2200
1804 Jul 22 (Saros 116)	1815 Jun 21 (Saros 117)	1826 May 21 (Saros 118)	1837 Apr 20 (Saros 119)	1848 Mar 19 (Saros 120)
1859 Feb 17 (Saros 121)	1870 Jan 17 (Saros 122)	1880 Dec 16 (Saros 123)	1891 Nov 16 (Saros 124)	1902 Oct 17 (Saros 125)
1913 Sep 15 (Saros 126)	1924 Aug 14 (Saros 127)	1935 Jul 16 (Saros 128)	1946 Jun 14 (Saros 129)	1957 May 13 (Saros 130)
1968 Apr 13 (Saros 131)	1979 Mar 13 (Saros 132)	1990 Feb 09 (Saros 133)	2001 Jan 09 (Saros 134)	2011 Dec 10 (Saros 135)
2022 Nov 08 (Saros 136)	2033 Oct 08 (Saros 137)	2044 Sep 07 (Saros 138)	2055 Aug 07 (Saros 139)	2066 Jul 07 (Saros 140)
2077 Jun 06 (Saros 141)	2088 May 05 (Saros 142)	2099 Apr 05 (Saros 143)	2110 Mar 06 (Saros 144)	2121 Feb 02 (Saros 145)
2132 Jan 02 (Saros 146)	2142 Dec 03 (Saros 147)	2153 Nov 01 (Saros 148)	2164 Sep 30 (Saros 149)	2175 Aug 31 (Saros 150)
2186 Jul 31 (Saros 151)	2197 Jun 29 (Saros 152)			

=== Inex series ===
This eclipse is a part of the long period inex cycle, repeating at alternating nodes, every 358 synodic months (≈ 10,571.95 days, or 29 years minus 20 days). Their appearance and longitude are irregular due to a lack of synchronization with the anomalistic month (period of perigee). However, groupings of 3 inex cycles (≈ 87 years minus 2 months) comes close (≈ 1,151.02 anomalistic months), so eclipses are similar in these groupings.

Series members between 1801 and 2200
1813 Feb 15 (Saros 130)	1842 Jan 26 (Saros 131)	1871 Jan 06 (Saros 132)
1899 Dec 17 (Saros 133)	1928 Nov 27 (Saros 134)	1957 Nov 07 (Saros 135)
1986 Oct 17 (Saros 136)	2015 Sep 28 (Saros 137)	2044 Sep 07 (Saros 138)
2073 Aug 17 (Saros 139)	2102 Jul 30 (Saros 140)	2131 Jul 10 (Saros 141)
2160 Jun 18 (Saros 142)	2189 May 29 (Saros 143)	

=== Half-Saros cycle ===
A lunar eclipse will be preceded and followed by solar eclipses by 9 years and 5.5 days (a half saros). This lunar eclipse is related to two total solar eclipses of Solar Saros 145.

September 2, 2035	September 12, 2053

== See also ==
- List of lunar eclipses and List of 21st-century lunar eclipses
