= 1954 lunar eclipse =

Two lunar eclipses occurred in 1954:

- 19 January 1954 total lunar eclipse
- 16 July 1954 partial lunar eclipse

== See also ==
- List of 20th-century lunar eclipses
- Lists of lunar eclipses
