= August 2026 lunar eclipse =

Astronomical event

- Partial eclipse
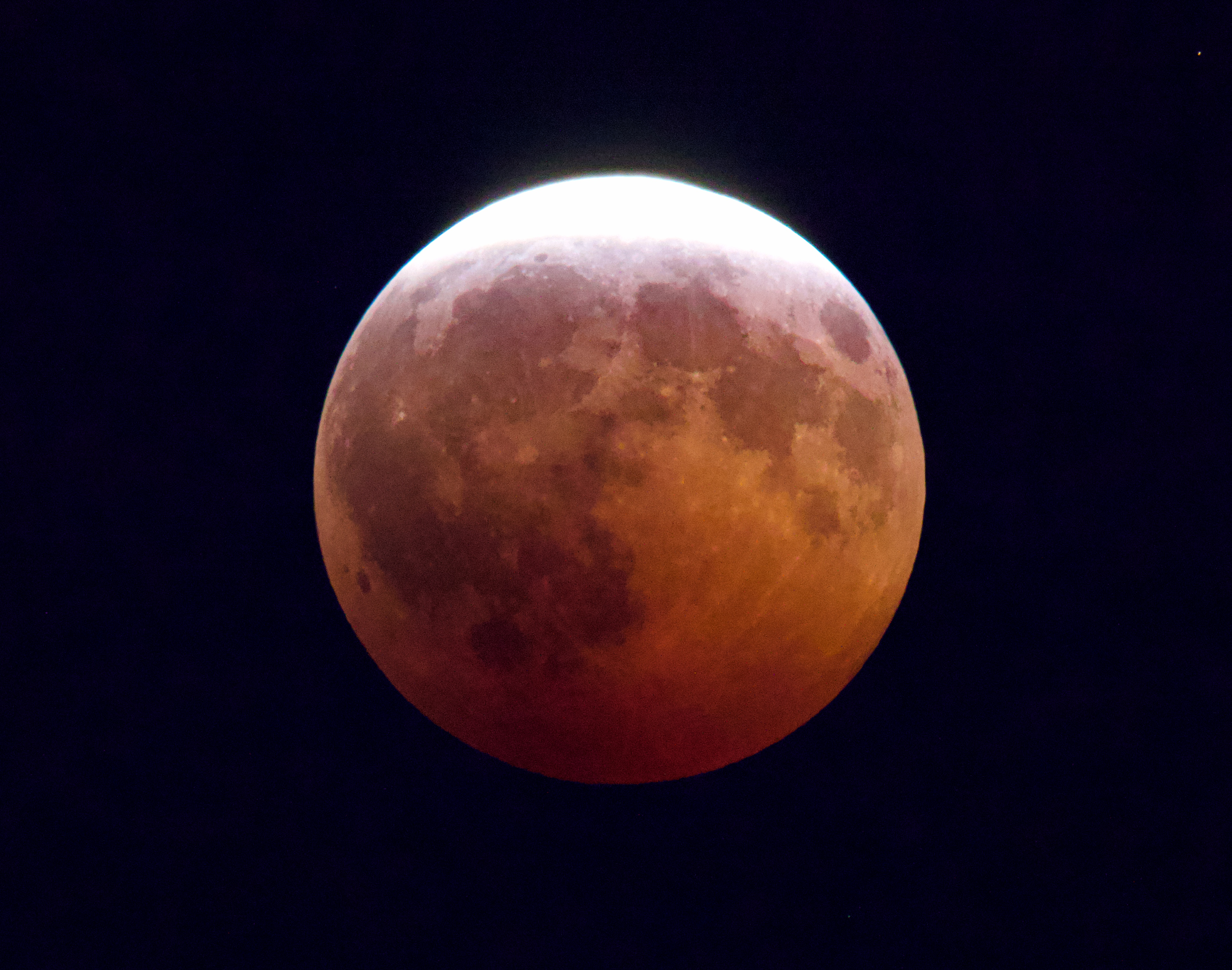
- From Victoria, British Columbia at 4:03 UTC
- Date: August 28, 2026
- Gamma: 0.4964
- Magnitude: 0.9319
- Saros cycle: 138 (29 of 82)
- Partiality: 198 minutes, 48 seconds
- Penumbral: 338 minutes, 31 seconds
Contacts (UTC)
- P1: 01:23:32
- U1: 02:33:25
- Greatest: 04:12:55
- U4: 05:52:13
- P4: 07:02:03

A partial lunar eclipse occurred at the Moon's ascending node of orbit on Friday, August 28, 2026, with an umbral magnitude of 0.9319. A lunar eclipse occurs when the Moon moves into the Earth's shadow, causing the Moon to be darkened. A partial lunar eclipse occurs when one part of the Moon is in the Earth's umbra, while the other part is in the Earth's penumbra. Unlike a solar eclipse, which can only be viewed from a relatively small area of the world, a lunar eclipse may be viewed from anywhere on the night side of Earth. Occurring about 5.8 days after apogee (08:20 UTC, August 22) and about 9.7 days before perigee (20:26 UTC, September 6), the Moon's apparent diameter was less than average.

This lunar eclipse was the last of an almost tetrad, with the others being on March 14, 2025 (total), September 8, 2025 (total), and March 3, 2026 (total).

== Visibility ==
The eclipse was completely visible over North and South America, seen rising over the central Pacific Ocean and setting over Africa, Europe, and the Middle East.

Storms were forecasted to impact the East Coast in the United States, which led to no visibility of partiality.

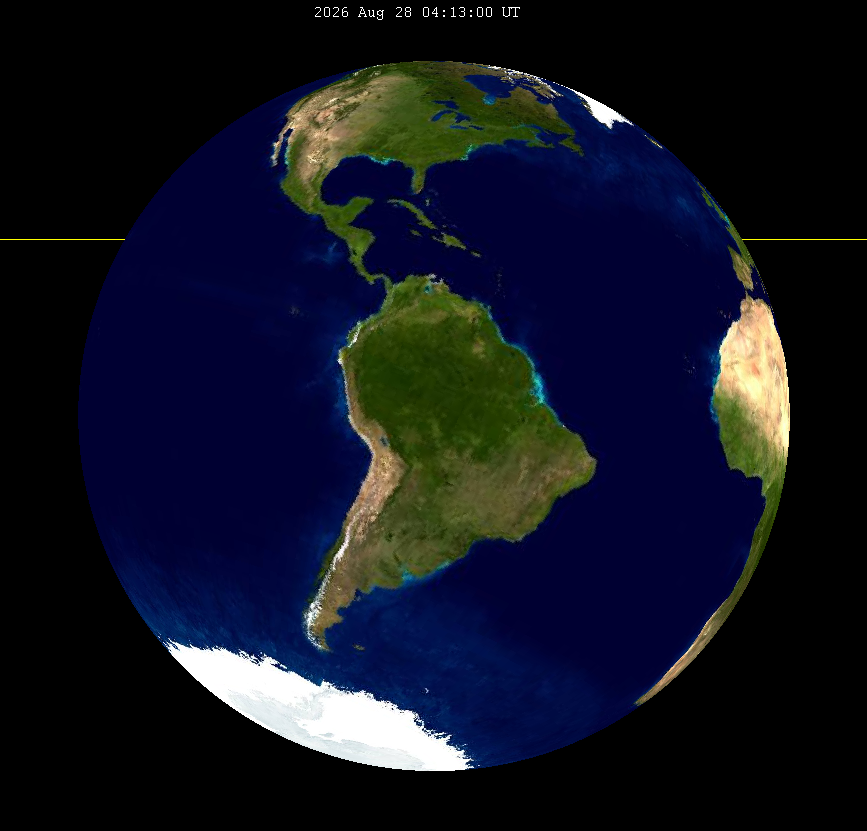
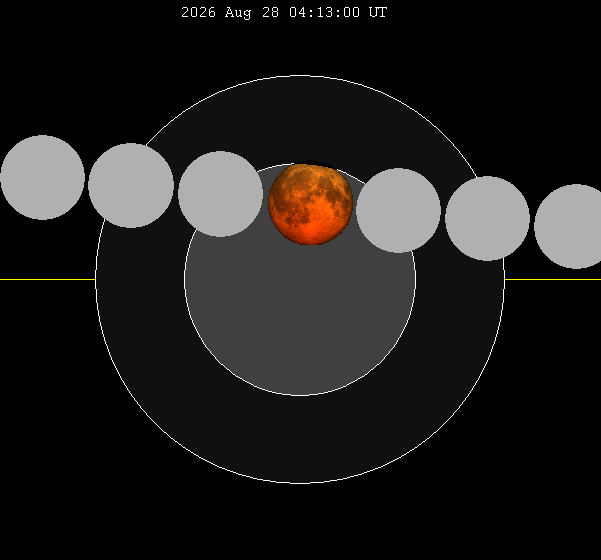

== Gallery ==
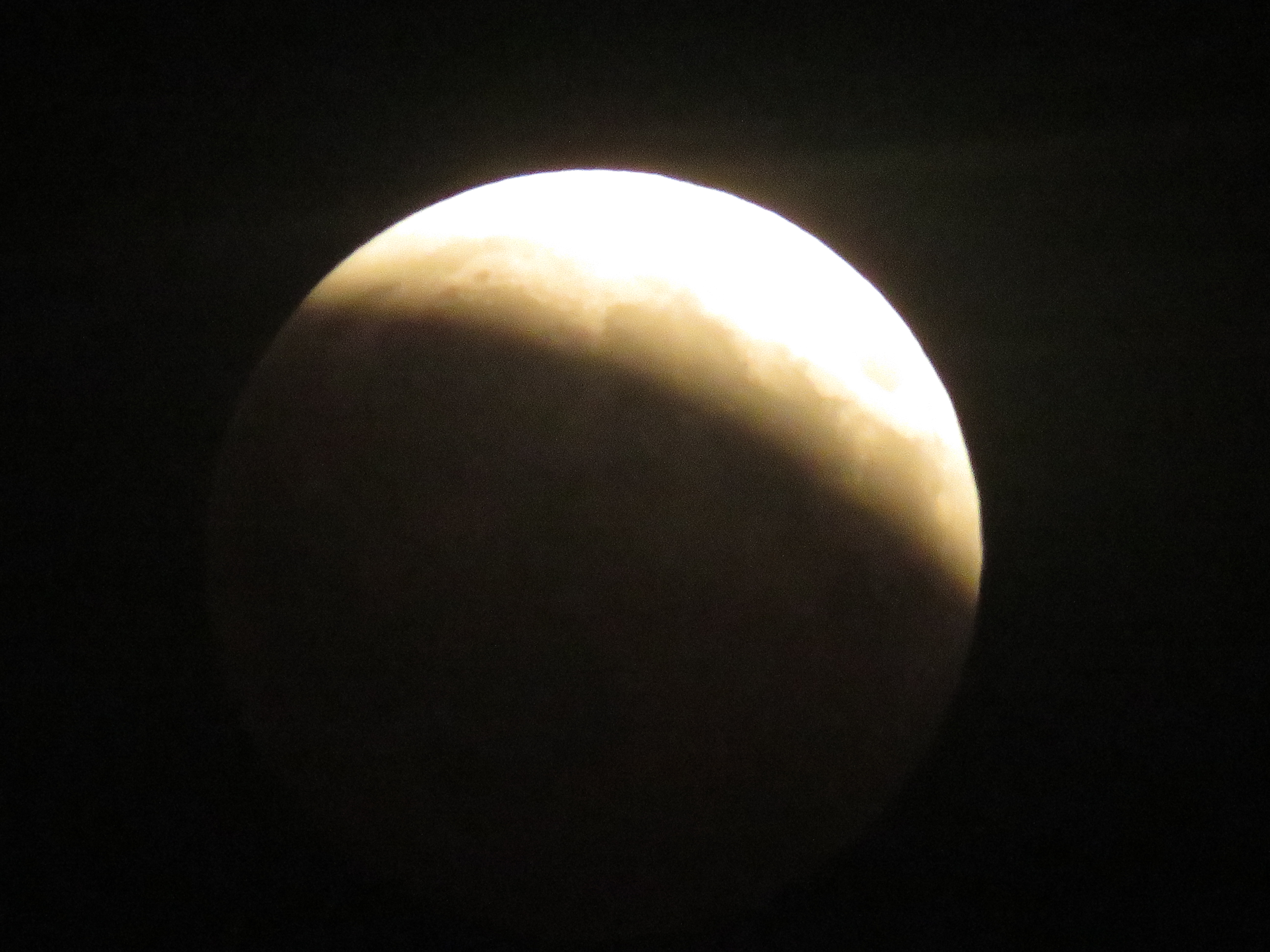
From Edmonton, Alberta, 3:32 UTC

From Miamisburg, Ohio, 4:41 UTC

From Richfield, Minnesota, 3:59 UTC

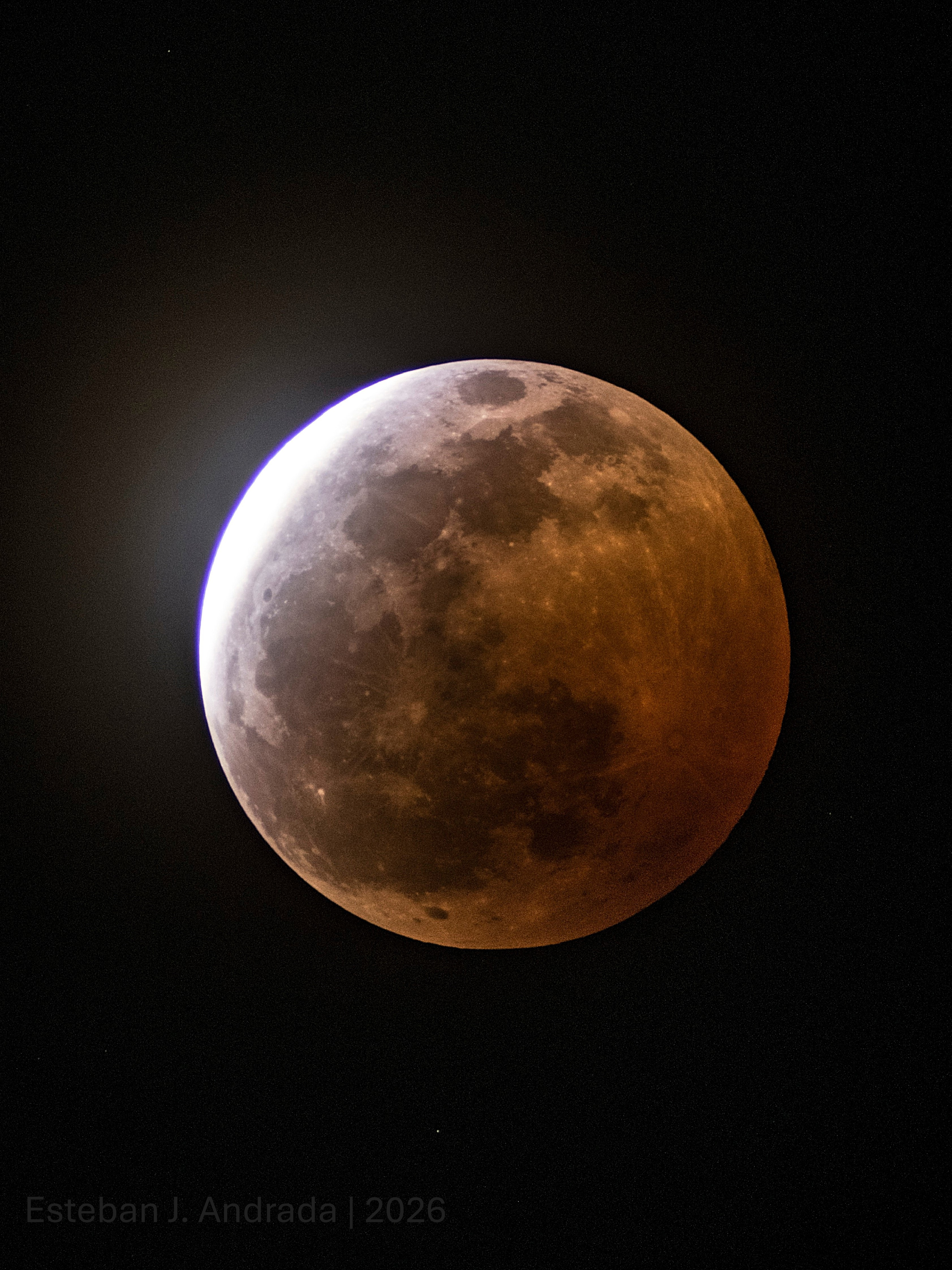
From Mar del Plata, Argentina, 4:04 UTC

From Parry Sound, Ontario, 4:12 UTC

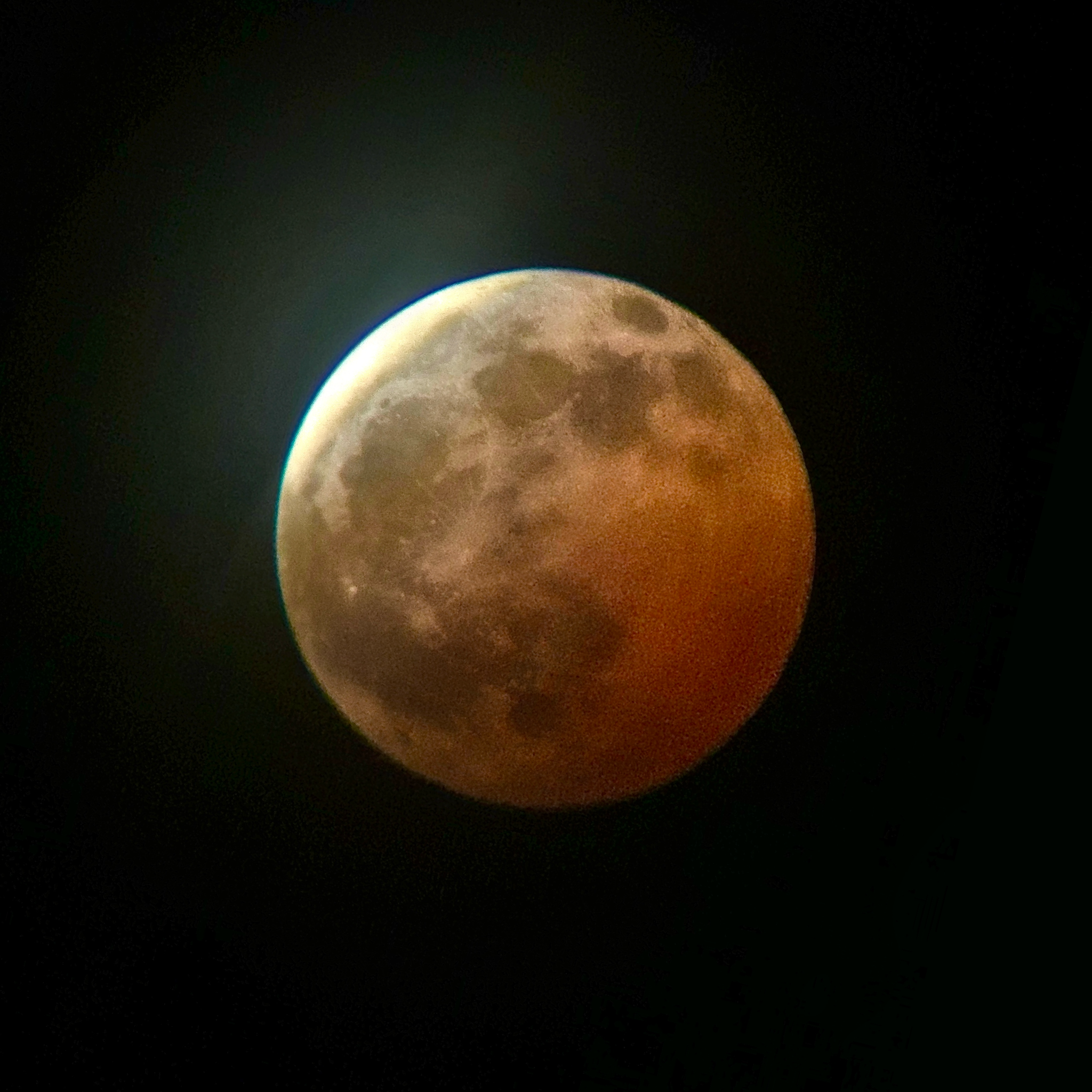
From Corpus Christi, Texas, 4:13 UTC

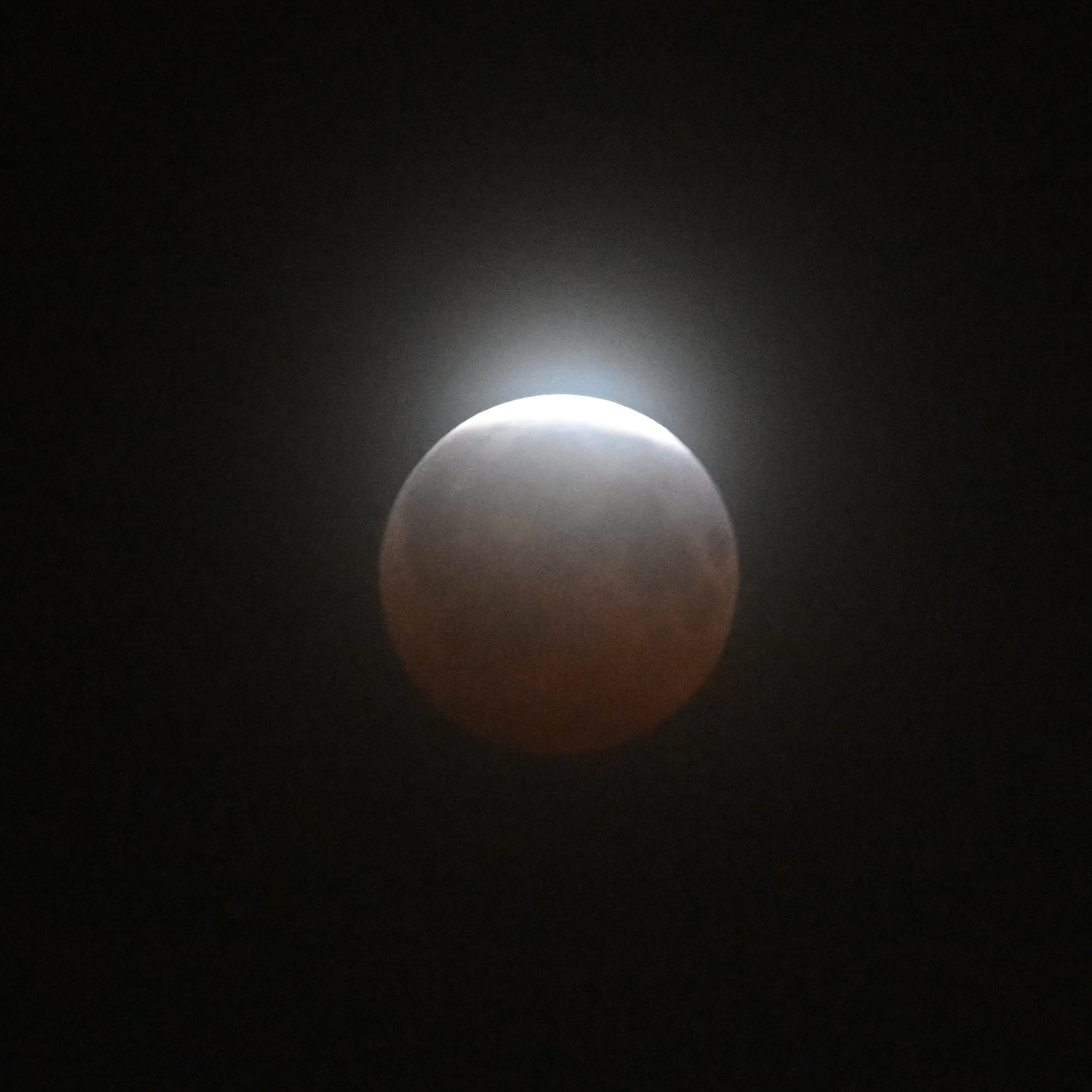
From Bethesda, Maryland, 4:23 UTC

From Halifax, Nova Scotia, 4:24 UTC

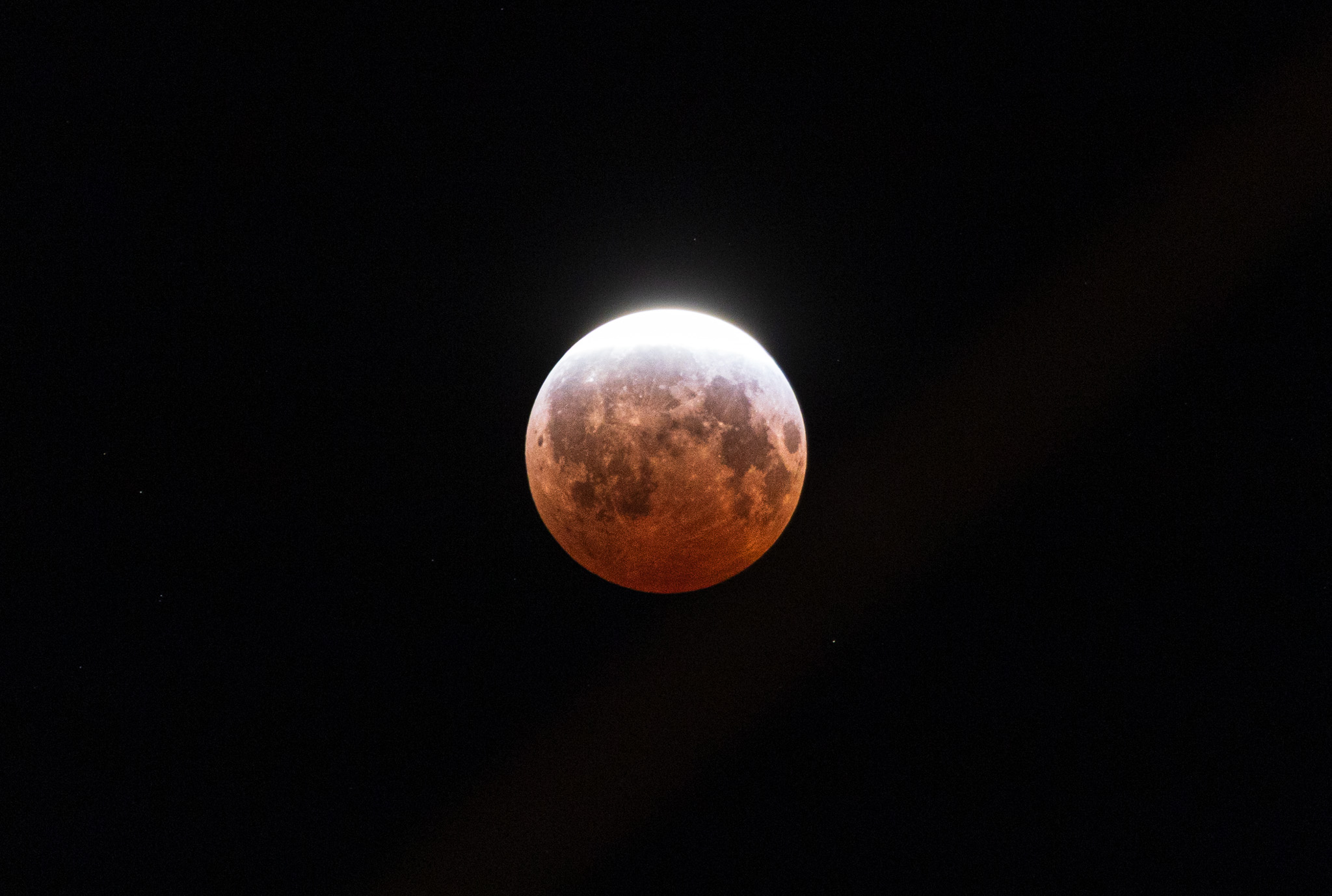
From Vega Baja, Puerto Rico, 4:26 UTC

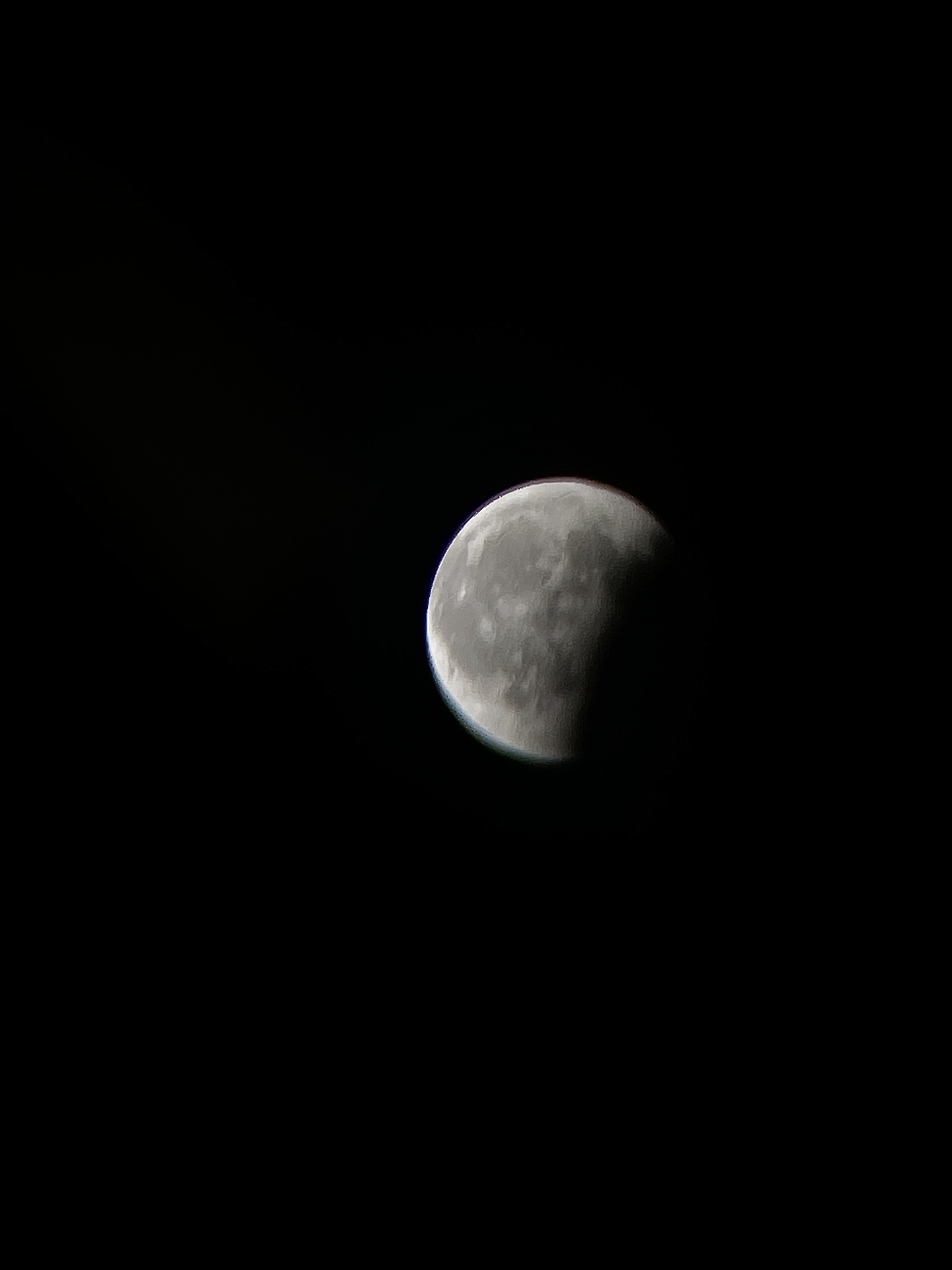
From Mexicali, Mexico, 5:30 UTC

Eclipse animation from Levico Terme, Italy

Eclipse animation from Belfort, France

Eclipse animation from Logroño, Spain

== Eclipse details ==
Shown below is a table displaying details about this particular eclipse. It describes various parameters pertaining to this eclipse.

August 28, 2026 Lunar Eclipse Parameters
Parameter	Value
Penumbral Magnitude	1.96645
Umbral Magnitude	0.93187
Gamma	0.49644
Sun Right Ascension	10^{h} 26^{m} 57.9^{s}
Sun Declination	09° 42′ 52.7″
Sun Semi-Diameter	15'50.0"
Sun Equatorial Horizontal Parallax	08.7"
Moon Right Ascension	22^{h} 26^{m} 06.3^{s}
Moon Declination	−09° 18′ 03.6″
Moon Semi-Diameter	15'18.2"
Moon Equatorial Horizontal Parallax	0°56'09.9"
ΔT	69.2 s

== Eclipse season ==
This eclipse is part of an eclipse season, a period, roughly every six months, when eclipses occur. Only two (or occasionally three) eclipse seasons occur each year, and each season lasts about 35 days and repeats just short of six months (173 days) later; thus two full eclipse seasons always occur each year. Either two or three eclipses happen each eclipse season. In the sequence below, each eclipse is separated by a fortnight.

Eclipse season of August 2026
August 12 Descending node (new moon)	August 28 Ascending node (full moon)
Total solar eclipse Solar Saros 126	Partial lunar eclipse Lunar Saros 138

== Related eclipses ==
=== Eclipses in 2026 ===
- An annular solar eclipse on February 17.
- A total lunar eclipse on March 3.
- A total solar eclipse on August 12.
- A partial lunar eclipse on August 28.

=== Metonic ===
- Preceded by: Lunar eclipse of November 8, 2022
- Followed by: Lunar eclipse of June 15, 2030

=== Tzolkinex ===
- Preceded by: Lunar eclipse of July 16, 2019
- Followed by: Lunar eclipse of October 8, 2033

=== Half-Saros ===
- Preceded by: Solar eclipse of August 21, 2017
- Followed by: Solar eclipse of September 2, 2035

=== Tritos ===
- Preceded by: Lunar eclipse of September 28, 2015
- Followed by: Lunar eclipse of July 27, 2037

=== Lunar Saros 138 ===
- Preceded by: Lunar eclipse of August 16, 2008
- Followed by: Lunar eclipse of September 7, 2044

=== Inex ===
- Preceded by: Lunar eclipse of September 16, 1997
- Followed by: Lunar eclipse of August 7, 2055

=== Triad ===
- Preceded by: Lunar eclipse of October 28, 1939
- Followed by: Lunar eclipse of June 29, 2113

=== Lunar eclipses of 2024–2027 ===
This eclipse is a member of a semester series. An eclipse in a semester series of lunar eclipses repeats approximately every 177 days and 4 hours (a semester) at alternating nodes of the Moon's orbit.

The penumbral lunar eclipse on July 18, 2027 occurs in the next lunar year eclipse set.

Lunar eclipse series sets from 2024 to 2027
Descending node				Ascending node			
Saros	Date Viewing	Type Chart	Gamma	Saros	Date Viewing	Type Chart	Gamma
113	2024 Mar 25	Penumbral	1.0610	118	2024 Sep 18	Partial	−0.9792
123	2025 Mar 14	Total	0.3485	128	2025 Sep 07	Total	−0.2752
133	2026 Mar 03	Total	−0.3765	138	2026 Aug 28	Partial	0.4964
143	2027 Feb 20	Penumbral	−1.0480	148	2027 Aug 17	Penumbral	1.2797

=== Metonic series ===
The Metonic cycle repeats nearly exactly every 19 years and represents a Saros cycle plus one lunar year. Because it occurs on the same calendar date, the Earth's shadow will be in nearly the same location relative to the background stars.

1. 1988 Mar 03.675 – Partial (113); 2. 2007 Mar 03.972 – Total (123); 3. 2026 Mar 03.481 – Total (133); 4. 2045 Mar 03.320 – Penumbral (143)	1. 1988 Aug 27.461 – partial (118); 2. 2007 Aug 28.442 – total (128); 3. 2026 Aug 28.175 – partial (138); 4. 2045 Aug 27.578 – penumbral (148)

=== Saros 138 ===
This eclipse is a part of Saros series 138, repeating every 18 years, 11 days, and containing 82 events. The series started with a penumbral lunar eclipse on October 15, 1521. It contains partial eclipses from June 24, 1918 through August 28, 2026; total eclipses from September 7, 2044 through June 8, 2495; and a second set of partial eclipses from June 19, 2513 through August 13, 2603. The series ends at member 82 as a penumbral eclipse on March 30, 2982.

The longest duration of totality will be produced by member 48 at 105 minutes, 24 seconds on March 24, 2369. All eclipses in this series occur at the Moon's ascending node of orbit.

Greatest	First			
The greatest eclipse of the series will occur on 2369 Mar 24, lasting 105 minutes, 24 seconds.	Penumbral	Partial	Total	Central
The greatest eclipse of the series will occur on 2369 Mar 24, lasting 105 minutes, 24 seconds.	1521 Oct 15	1918 Jun 24	2044 Sep 07	2116 Oct 21
The greatest eclipse of the series will occur on 2369 Mar 24, lasting 105 minutes, 24 seconds.	Last			
The greatest eclipse of the series will occur on 2369 Mar 24, lasting 105 minutes, 24 seconds.	Central	Total	Partial	Penumbral
The greatest eclipse of the series will occur on 2369 Mar 24, lasting 105 minutes, 24 seconds.	2441 May 06	2495 Jun 08	2603 Aug 13	2982 Mar 30

Eclipses are tabulated in three columns; every third eclipse in the same column is one exeligmos apart, so they all cast shadows over approximately the same parts of the Earth.

Series members 17–38 occur between 1801 and 2200:
17	18	19
1810 Apr 19	1828 Apr 29	1846 May 11
20	21	22
1864 May 21	1882 Jun 01	1900 Jun 13
23	24	25
1918 Jun 24	1936 Jul 04	1954 Jul 16
26	27	28
1972 Jul 26	1990 Aug 06	2008 Aug 16
29	30	31
2026 Aug 28	2044 Sep 07	2062 Sep 18
32	33	34
2080 Sep 29	2098 Oct 10	2116 Oct 21
35	36	37
2134 Nov 02	2152 Nov 12	2170 Nov 23
38
2188 Dec 04

=== Tritos series ===
This eclipse is a part of a tritos cycle, repeating at alternating nodes every 135 synodic months (≈ 3986.63 days, or 11 years minus 1 month). Their appearance and longitude are irregular due to a lack of synchronization with the anomalistic month (period of perigee), but groupings of 3 tritos cycles (≈ 33 years minus 3 months) come close (≈ 434.044 anomalistic months), so eclipses are similar in these groupings.

Series members between 1801 and 2200
1808 May 10 (Saros 118)	1819 Apr 10 (Saros 119)	1830 Mar 09 (Saros 120)	1841 Feb 06 (Saros 121)	1852 Jan 07 (Saros 122)
1862 Dec 06 (Saros 123)	1873 Nov 04 (Saros 124)	1884 Oct 04 (Saros 125)	1895 Sep 04 (Saros 126)	1906 Aug 04 (Saros 127)
1917 Jul 04 (Saros 128)	1928 Jun 03 (Saros 129)	1939 May 03 (Saros 130)	1950 Apr 02 (Saros 131)	1961 Mar 02 (Saros 132)
1972 Jan 30 (Saros 133)	1982 Dec 30 (Saros 134)	1993 Nov 29 (Saros 135)	2004 Oct 28 (Saros 136)	2015 Sep 28 (Saros 137)
2026 Aug 28 (Saros 138)	2037 Jul 27 (Saros 139)	2048 Jun 26 (Saros 140)	2059 May 27 (Saros 141)	2070 Apr 25 (Saros 142)
2081 Mar 25 (Saros 143)	2092 Feb 23 (Saros 144)	2103 Jan 23 (Saros 145)	2113 Dec 22 (Saros 146)	2124 Nov 21 (Saros 147)
2135 Oct 22 (Saros 148)	2146 Sep 20 (Saros 149)	2157 Aug 20 (Saros 150)	2168 Jul 20 (Saros 151)	2179 Jun 19 (Saros 152)
2190 May 19 (Saros 153)

=== Inex series ===
This eclipse is a part of the long period inex cycle, repeating at alternating nodes, every 358 synodic months (≈ 10,571.95 days, or 29 years minus 20 days). Their appearance and longitude are irregular due to a lack of synchronization with the anomalistic month (period of perigee). However, groupings of 3 inex cycles (≈ 87 years minus 2 months) comes close (≈ 1,151.02 anomalistic months), so eclipses are similar in these groupings.

Series members between 1801 and 2200
1824 Jan 16 (Saros 131)	1852 Dec 26 (Saros 132)	1881 Dec 05 (Saros 133)
1910 Nov 17 (Saros 134)	1939 Oct 28 (Saros 135)	1968 Oct 06 (Saros 136)
1997 Sep 16 (Saros 137)	2026 Aug 28 (Saros 138)	2055 Aug 07 (Saros 139)
2084 Jul 17 (Saros 140)	2113 Jun 29 (Saros 141)	2142 Jun 08 (Saros 142)
2171 May 19 (Saros 143)	2200 Apr 30 (Saros 144)	

=== Half-Saros cycle ===
A lunar eclipse will be preceded and followed by solar eclipses by 9 years and 5.5 days (a half saros). This lunar eclipse is related to two total solar eclipses of Solar Saros 145.

August 21, 2017	September 1–2, 2035

== See also ==
- List of lunar eclipses and List of 21st-century lunar eclipses
- Solar eclipse of August 12, 2026 – Occurred two weeks prior
