= July 1954 lunar eclipse =

Partial lunar eclipse July 16, 1954

- Partial eclipse
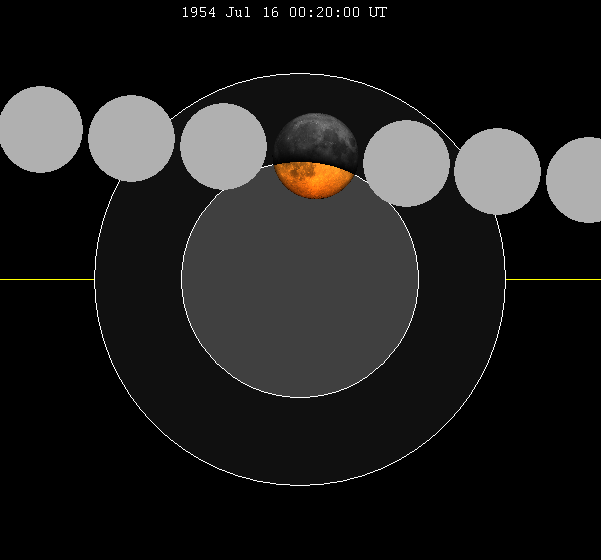
- The Moon's hourly motion shown right to left
- Date: July 15–16, 1954
- Gamma: 0.7877
- Magnitude: 0.4054
- Saros cycle: 138 (26 of 83)
- Partiality: 140 minutes, 55 seconds
- Penumbral: 301 minutes, 37 seconds
Contacts (UTC)
- P1: 21:49:33
- U1: 23:09:58
- Greatest: 0:20:20
- U4: 1:30:53
- P4: 2:51:10

A partial lunar eclipse occurred at the Moon’s ascending node of orbit on Thursday, July 15 and Friday, July 16, 1954, with an umbral magnitude of 0.4054. A lunar eclipse occurs when the Moon moves into the Earth's shadow, causing the Moon to be darkened. A partial lunar eclipse occurs when one part of the Moon is in the Earth's umbra, while the other part is in the Earth's penumbra. Unlike a solar eclipse, which can only be viewed from a relatively small area of the world, a lunar eclipse may be viewed from anywhere on the night side of Earth. The Moon's apparent diameter was near the average diameter because it occurred 6.6 days after apogee (on July 9, 1954, at 9:25 UTC) and 7.8 days before perigee (on July 23, 1954, at 19:30 UTC).

== Visibility ==
The eclipse was completely visible over eastern South America, Africa, Europe, and Antarctica, seen rising over northwestern South America and much of central and eastern North America and setting over eastern Europe, the western half of Asia, and western Australia.

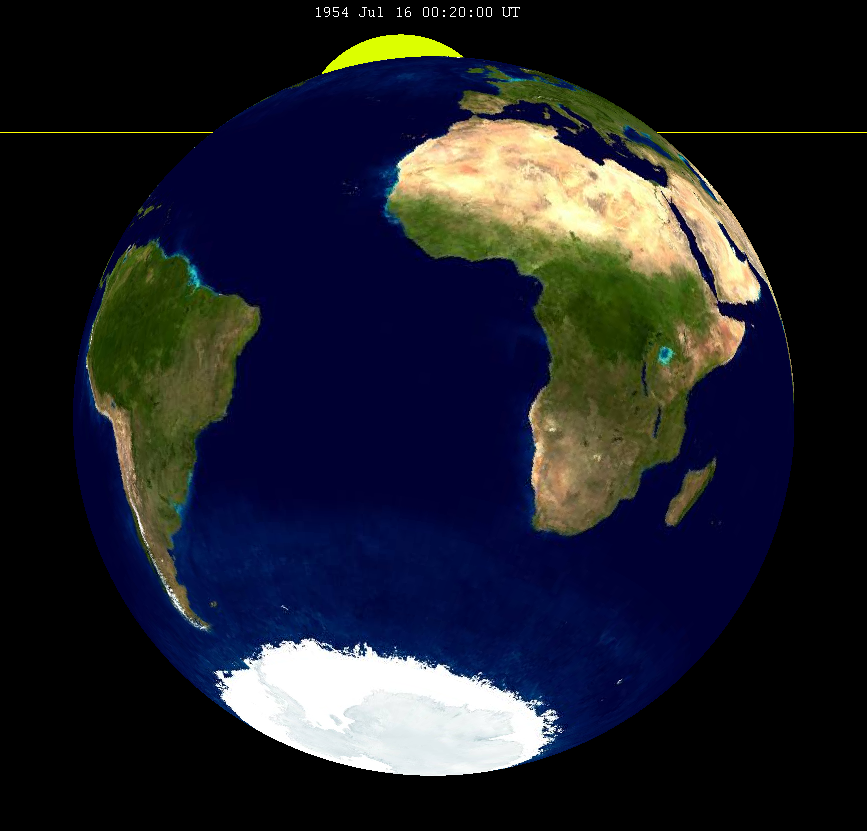
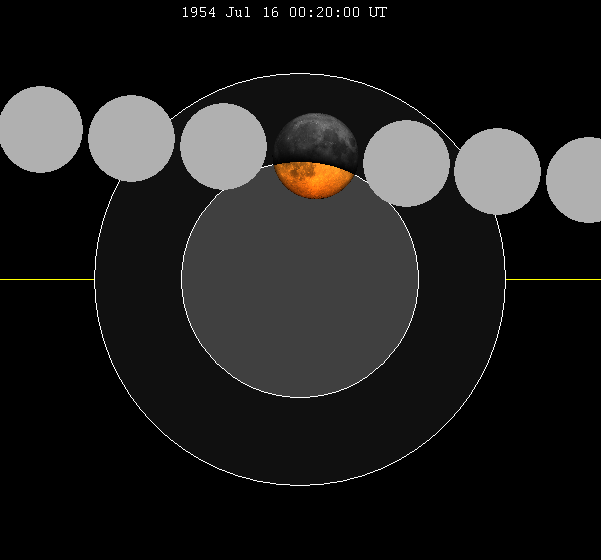

== Eclipse details ==
Shown below is a table displaying details about this particular lunar eclipse. It describes various parameters pertaining to this eclipse.

July 15–16, 1954 Lunar Eclipse Parameters
| Parameter | Value |
|---|---|
| Penumbral Magnitude | 1.42024 |
| Umbral Magnitude | 0.40537 |
| Gamma | 0.78767 |
| Sun Right Ascension | 07h39m05.3s |
| Sun Declination | +21°29'36.6" |
| Sun Semi-Diameter | 15'44.2" |
| Sun Equatorial Horizontal Parallax | 08.7" |
| Moon Right Ascension | 19h38m14.9s |
| Moon Declination | -20°46'21.3" |
| Moon Semi-Diameter | 15'30.4" |
| Moon Equatorial Horizontal Parallax | 0°56'54.4" |
| ΔT | 30.9 s |

== Eclipse season ==
This eclipse is part of an eclipse season, a period, roughly every six months, when eclipses occur. Only two (or occasionally three) eclipse seasons occur each year, and each season lasts about 35 days and repeats just short of six months (173 days) later; thus two full eclipse seasons always occur each year. Either two or three eclipses happen each eclipse season. In the sequence below, each eclipse is separated by a fortnight.

Eclipse season of June–July 1954
| June 30 Descending node (new moon) | July 15–16 Ascending node (full moon) |
|---|---|
| Total solar eclipse Solar Saros 126 | Partial lunar eclipse Lunar Saros 138 |

== Related eclipses ==
=== Eclipses in 1954 ===
- An annular solar eclipse on January 5.
- A total lunar eclipse on January 19.
- A total solar eclipse on June 30.
- A partial lunar eclipse on July 15–16.
- An annular solar eclipse on December 25.

=== Metonic ===
- Preceded by: Lunar eclipse of September 26, 1950
- Followed by: Lunar eclipse of May 3, 1958

=== Tzolkinex ===
- Preceded by: Lunar eclipse of June 3, 1947
- Followed by: Lunar eclipse of August 26, 1961

=== Half-Saros ===
- Preceded by: Solar eclipse of July 9, 1945
- Followed by: Solar eclipse of July 20, 1963

=== Tritos ===
- Preceded by: Lunar eclipse of August 15, 1943
- Followed by: Lunar eclipse of June 14, 1965

=== Lunar Saros 138 ===
- Preceded by: Lunar eclipse of July 4, 1936
- Followed by: Lunar eclipse of July 26, 1972

=== Inex ===
- Preceded by: Lunar eclipse of August 4, 1925
- Followed by: Lunar eclipse of June 25, 1983

=== Triad ===
- Preceded by: Lunar eclipse of September 14, 1867
- Followed by: Lunar eclipse of May 16, 2041

=== Lunar eclipses of 1951–1955 ===
This eclipse is a member of a semester series. An eclipse in a semester series of lunar eclipses repeats approximately every 177 days and 4 hours (a semester) at alternating nodes of the Moon's orbit.

The penumbral lunar eclipses on March 23, 1951 and September 15, 1951 occur in the previous lunar year eclipse set, and the lunar eclipses on June 5, 1955 (penumbral) and November 29, 1955 (partial) occur in the next lunar year eclipse set.

Lunar eclipse series sets from 1951 to 1955
| Descending node | | | | Ascending node | | | |
| Saros | Date Viewing | Type Chart | Gamma | Saros | Date Viewing | Type Chart | Gamma |
| 103 | 1951 Feb 21 | Penumbral | − | 108 | 1951 Aug 17 | Penumbral | −1.4828 |
| 113 | 1952 Feb 11 | Partial | 0.9416 | 118 | 1952 Aug 05 | Partial | −0.7384 |
| 123 | 1953 Jan 29 | Total | 0.2606 | 128 | 1953 Jul 26 | Total | −0.0071 |
| 133 | 1954 Jan 19 | Total | −0.4357 | 138 | 1954 Jul 16 | Partial | 0.7877 |
| 143 | 1955 Jan 08 | Penumbral | −1.0907 | | | | |

=== Saros 138 ===
This eclipse is a part of Saros series 138, repeating every 18 years, 11 days, and containing 82 events. The series started with a penumbral lunar eclipse on October 15, 1521. It contains partial eclipses from June 24, 1918 through August 28, 2026; total eclipses from September 7, 2044 through June 8, 2495; and a second set of partial eclipses from June 19, 2513 through August 13, 2603. The series ends at member 82 as a penumbral eclipse on March 30, 2982.

The longest duration of totality will be produced by member 48 at 105 minutes, 24 seconds on March 24, 2369. All eclipses in this series occur at the Moon's ascending node of orbit.

| Greatest | First | | | |
|---|---|---|---|---|
| The greatest eclipse of the series will occur on 2369 Mar 24, lasting 105 minutes, 24 seconds. | Penumbral | Partial | Total | Central |
| The greatest eclipse of the series will occur on 2369 Mar 24, lasting 105 minutes, 24 seconds. | 1521 Oct 15 | 1918 Jun 24 | 2044 Sep 07 | 2116 Oct 21 |
| The greatest eclipse of the series will occur on 2369 Mar 24, lasting 105 minutes, 24 seconds. | Last | | | |
| The greatest eclipse of the series will occur on 2369 Mar 24, lasting 105 minutes, 24 seconds. | Central | Total | Partial | Penumbral |
| The greatest eclipse of the series will occur on 2369 Mar 24, lasting 105 minutes, 24 seconds. | 2441 May 06 | 2495 Jun 08 | 2603 Aug 13 | 2982 Mar 30 |

Eclipses are tabulated in three columns; every third eclipse in the same column is one exeligmos apart, so they all cast shadows over approximately the same parts of the Earth.

Series members 17–38 occur between 1801 and 2200:
| 17 | 18 | 19 |
|---|---|---|
| 1810 Apr 19 | 1828 Apr 29 | 1846 May 11 |
| 20 | 21 | 22 |
| 1864 May 21 | 1882 Jun 01 | 1900 Jun 13 |
| 23 | 24 | 25 |
| 1918 Jun 24 | 1936 Jul 04 | 1954 Jul 16 |
| 26 | 27 | 28 |
| 1972 Jul 26 | 1990 Aug 06 | 2008 Aug 16 |
| 29 | 30 | 31 |
| 2026 Aug 28 | 2044 Sep 07 | 2062 Sep 18 |
| 32 | 33 | 34 |
| 2080 Sep 29 | 2098 Oct 10 | 2116 Oct 21 |
| 35 | 36 | 37 |
| 2134 Nov 02 | 2152 Nov 12 | 2170 Nov 23 |
38
2188 Dec 04

=== Tritos series ===
This eclipse is a part of a tritos cycle, repeating at alternating nodes every 135 synodic months (≈ 3986.63 days, or 11 years minus 1 month). Their appearance and longitude are irregular due to a lack of synchronization with the anomalistic month (period of perigee), but groupings of 3 tritos cycles (≈ 33 years minus 3 months) come close (≈ 434.044 anomalistic months), so eclipses are similar in these groupings.

Series members between 1801 and 2183
| 1801 Sep 22 (Saros 124) | 1812 Aug 22 (Saros 125) | 1823 Jul 23 (Saros 126) | 1834 Jun 21 (Saros 127) | 1845 May 21 (Saros 128) |
| 1856 Apr 20 (Saros 129) | 1867 Mar 20 (Saros 130) | 1878 Feb 17 (Saros 131) | 1889 Jan 17 (Saros 132) | 1899 Dec 17 (Saros 133) |
| 1910 Nov 17 (Saros 134) | 1921 Oct 16 (Saros 135) | 1932 Sep 14 (Saros 136) | 1943 Aug 15 (Saros 137) | 1954 Jul 16 (Saros 138) |
| 1965 Jun 14 (Saros 139) | 1976 May 13 (Saros 140) | 1987 Apr 14 (Saros 141) | 1998 Mar 13 (Saros 142) | 2009 Feb 09 (Saros 143) |
| 2020 Jan 10 (Saros 144) | 2030 Dec 09 (Saros 145) | 2041 Nov 08 (Saros 146) | 2052 Oct 08 (Saros 147) | 2063 Sep 07 (Saros 148) |
| 2074 Aug 07 (Saros 149) | 2085 Jul 07 (Saros 150) | 2096 Jun 06 (Saros 151) | 2107 May 07 (Saros 152) | |
| | | 2151 Jan 02 (Saros 156) | | 2172 Oct 31 (Saros 158) |
2183 Oct 01 (Saros 159)

=== Inex series ===
This eclipse is a part of the long period inex cycle, repeating at alternating nodes, every 358 synodic months (≈ 10,571.95 days, or 29 years minus 20 days). Their appearance and longitude are irregular due to a lack of synchronization with the anomalistic month (period of perigee). However, groupings of 3 inex cycles (≈ 87 years minus 2 months) comes close (≈ 1,151.02 anomalistic months), so eclipses are similar in these groupings.

Series members between 1801 and 2200
| 1809 Oct 23 (Saros 133) | 1838 Oct 03 (Saros 134) | 1867 Sep 14 (Saros 135) |
| 1896 Aug 23 (Saros 136) | 1925 Aug 04 (Saros 137) | 1954 Jul 16 (Saros 138) |
| 1983 Jun 25 (Saros 139) | 2012 Jun 04 (Saros 140) | 2041 May 16 (Saros 141) |
| 2070 Apr 25 (Saros 142) | 2099 Apr 05 (Saros 143) | 2128 Mar 16 (Saros 144) |
| 2157 Feb 24 (Saros 145) | 2186 Feb 04 (Saros 146) | |

=== Half-Saros cycle ===
A lunar eclipse will be preceded and followed by solar eclipses by 9 years and 5.5 days (a half saros). This lunar eclipse is related to two total solar eclipses of Solar Saros 145.

| July 9, 1945 | July 20, 1963 |

== See also ==
- List of lunar eclipses
- List of 20th-century lunar eclipses
