= Lunar Saros 138 =

Eclipse cycle of the moon

Member 28
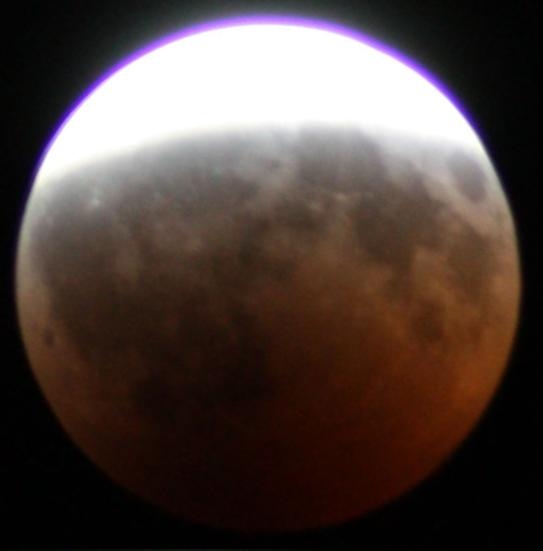
2008 Aug 16

Saros cycle series 138 for lunar eclipses occurs at the moon's ascending node, 18 years 11 and 1/3 days. It contains 82 events.

== Summary ==
This eclipse is a part of Saros series 138, repeating every 18 years, 11 days, and containing 82 events. The series started with a penumbral lunar eclipse on October 15, 1521. It contains partial eclipses from June 24, 1918 through August 28, 2026; total eclipses from September 7, 2044 through June 8, 2495; and a second set of partial eclipses from June 19, 2513 through August 13, 2603. The series ends at member 82 as a penumbral eclipse on March 30, 2982.

The longest duration of totality will be produced by member 48 at 105 minutes, 24 seconds on March 24, 2369. All eclipses in this series occur at the Moon’s ascending node of orbit.

Greatest	First			
The greatest eclipse of the series will occur on 2369 Mar 24, lasting 105 minutes, 24 seconds.	Penumbral	Partial	Total	Central
The greatest eclipse of the series will occur on 2369 Mar 24, lasting 105 minutes, 24 seconds.	1521 Oct 15	1918 Jun 24	2044 Sep 07	2116 Oct 21
The greatest eclipse of the series will occur on 2369 Mar 24, lasting 105 minutes, 24 seconds.	Last			
The greatest eclipse of the series will occur on 2369 Mar 24, lasting 105 minutes, 24 seconds.	Central	Total	Partial	Penumbral
The greatest eclipse of the series will occur on 2369 Mar 24, lasting 105 minutes, 24 seconds.	2441 May 06	2495 Jun 08	2603 Aug 13	2982 Mar 30

Eclipses are tabulated in three columns; every third eclipse in the same column is one exeligmos apart, so they all cast shadows over approximately the same parts of the Earth.

Series members 17–38 occur between 1801 and 2200:
17	18	19
1810 Apr 19	1828 Apr 29	1846 May 11
20	21	22
1864 May 21	1882 Jun 01	1900 Jun 13
23	24	25
1918 Jun 24	1936 Jul 04	1954 Jul 16
26	27	28
1972 Jul 26	1990 Aug 06	2008 Aug 16
29	30	31
2026 Aug 28	2044 Sep 07	2062 Sep 18
32	33	34
2080 Sep 29	2098 Oct 10	2116 Oct 21
35	36	37
2134 Nov 02	2152 Nov 12	2170 Nov 23
38
2188 Dec 04

== List ==
Cat.	Saros	Mem	Date	Time UT (hr:mn)	Type	Gamma	Magnitude	Duration (min)			Contacts UT (hr:mn)						Chart
Cat.	Saros	Mem	Date	Greatest	Type	Gamma	Magnitude	Pen.	Par.	Tot.	P1	P4	U1	U2	U3	U4	Chart
08481	138	1	1521 Oct 15	23:41:27	Penumbral	1.5291	-0.9345	53.1			23:14:54	0:08:00					
08522	138	2	1539 Oct 27	8:11:00	Penumbral	1.5126	-0.9063	71.9			7:35:03	8:46:57					
08565	138	3	1557 Nov 06	16:45:01	Penumbral	1.5003	-0.8857	83.5			16:03:16	17:26:46					
08608	138	4	1575 Nov 18	1:25:13	Penumbral	1.4936	-0.8751	89.6			0:40:25	2:10:01					
08651	138	5	1593 Dec 08	10:08:29	Penumbral	1.4899	-0.8701	93.1			9:21:56	10:55:02					
08695	138	6	1611 Dec 19	18:54:22	Penumbral	1.4891	-0.8700	94.4			18:07:10	19:41:34					
08739	138	7	1629 Dec 30	3:40:31	Penumbral	1.4892	-0.8713	95.0			2:53:01	4:28:01					
08783	138	8	1648 Jan 10	12:26:15	Penumbral	1.4897	-0.8730	95.3			11:38:36	13:13:54					
08828	138	9	1666 Jan 20	21:09:12	Penumbral	1.4886	-0.8717	96.6			20:20:54	21:57:30					
08874	138	10	1684 Feb 01	5:47:50	Penumbral	1.4849	-0.8653	99.6			4:58:02	6:37:38					
08920	138	11	1702 Feb 12	14:21:25	Penumbral	1.4778	-0.8527	104.6			13:29:07	15:13:43					
08966	138	12	1720 Feb 23	22:48:32	Penumbral	1.4666	-0.8322	111.9			21:52:35	23:44:29					
09013	138	13	1738 Mar 06	7:07:15	Penumbral	1.4492	-0.8003	122.2			6:06:09	8:08:21					
09060	138	14	1756 Mar 16	15:17:47	Penumbral	1.4259	-0.7575	134.6			14:10:29	16:25:05					
09106	138	15	1774 Mar 27	23:19:02	Penumbral	1.3960	-0.7026	148.9			22:04:35	0:33:29					
09151	138	16	1792 Apr 07	7:12:01	Penumbral	1.3602	-0.6370	164.1			5:49:58	8:34:04					
09196	138	17	1810 Apr 19	14:54:06	Penumbral	1.3165	-0.5570	180.6			13:23:48	16:24:24					
09241	138	18	1828 Apr 29	22:28:38	Penumbral	1.2674	-0.4671	197.2			20:50:02	0:07:14					
09288	138	19	1846 May 11	5:53:43	Penumbral	1.2111	-0.3643	214.2			4:06:37	7:40:49					
09332	138	20	1864 May 21	13:12:02	Penumbral	1.1502	-0.2531	230.6			11:16:44	15:07:20					
09376	138	21	1882 Jun 01	20:21:58	Penumbral	1.0832	-0.1311	246.8			18:18:34	22:25:22					
09420	138	22	1900 Jun 13	3:27:37	Penumbral	1.0134	-0.0040	261.9			1:16:40	5:38:34					
09462	138	23	1918 Jun 24	10:28:03	Partial	0.9397	0.1297	276.3	82.4		8:09:54	12:46:12	9:46:51			11:09:15	
09504	138	24	1936 Jul 04	17:25:23	Partial	0.8642	0.2668	289.5	116.3		15:00:38	19:50:08	16:27:14			18:23:32	
09545	138	25	1954 Jul 16	0:20:51	Partial	0.7876	0.4054	301.6	140.9		21:50:03	2:51:39	23:10:24			1:31:18	
09586	138	26	1972 Jul 26	7:16:22	Partial	0.7116	0.5427	312.4	160.1		4:40:10	9:52:34	5:56:19			8:36:25	
09627	138	27	1990 Aug 06	14:13:16	Partial	0.6374	0.6766	322.0	175.5		11:32:16	16:54:16	12:45:31			15:41:01	
09668	138	28	2008 Aug 16	21:11:12	Partial	0.5646	0.8076	330.5	188.1		18:25:57	23:56:27	19:37:09			22:45:15	
09709	138	29	2026 Aug 28	4:14:04	Partial	0.4964	0.9299	337.8	198.1		1:25:10	7:02:58	2:35:01			5:53:07	
09750	138	30	2044 Sep 07	11:20:44	Total	0.4318	1.0456	344.0	206.2	33.9	8:28:44	14:12:44	9:37:38	11:03:47	11:37:41	13:03:50	
09791	138	31	2062 Sep 18	18:34:02	Total	0.3735	1.1496	349.3	212.4	59.5	15:39:23	21:28:41	16:47:50	18:04:17	19:03:47	20:20:14	
09832	138	32	2080 Sep 29	1:52:42	Total	0.3203	1.2443	353.7	217.4	73.8	22:55:51	4:49:33	0:04:00	1:15:48	2:29:36	3:41:24	
09874	138	33	2098 Oct 10	9:19:58	Total	0.2749	1.3246	357.4	221.0	82.7	6:21:16	12:18:40	7:29:28	8:38:37	10:01:19	11:10:28	
09916	138	34	2116 Oct 21	16:53:39	Total	0.2353	1.3943	360.5	223.8	88.8	13:53:24	19:53:54	15:01:45	16:09:15	17:38:03	18:45:33	
09958	138	35	2134 Nov 02	0:34:20	Total	0.2022	1.4521	363.1	225.9	93.0	21:32:47	3:35:53	22:41:23	23:47:50	1:20:50	2:27:17	
10002	138	36	2152 Nov 12	8:21:47	Total	0.1753	1.4989	365.4	227.5	95.8	5:19:05	11:24:29	6:28:02	7:33:53	9:09:41	10:15:32	
10045	138	37	2170 Nov 23	16:16:21	Total	0.1554	1.5331	367.2	228.6	97.7	13:12:45	19:19:57	14:22:03	15:27:30	17:05:12	18:10:39	
10088	138	38	2188 Dec 04	0:15:39	Total	0.1394	1.5602	368.8	229.5	98.9	21:11:15	3:20:03	22:20:54	23:26:12	1:05:06	2:10:24	
10131	138	39	2206 Dec 16	8:19:07	Total	0.1275	1.5802	370.2	230.3	99.8	5:14:01	11:24:13	6:23:58	7:29:13	9:09:01	10:14:16	
10175	138	40	2224 Dec 26	16:25:17	Total	0.1183	1.5956	371.5	230.9	100.5	13:19:32	19:31:02	14:29:50	15:35:02	17:15:32	18:20:44	
10220	138	41	2243 Jan 07	0:33:44	Total	0.1116	1.6069	372.5	231.4	101.0	21:27:29	3:39:59	22:38:02	23:43:14	1:24:14	2:29:26	
10266	138	42	2261 Jan 17	8:40:06	Total	0.1036	1.6208	373.4	231.9	101.5	5:33:24	11:46:48	6:44:09	7:49:21	9:30:51	10:36:03	
10312	138	43	2279 Jan 28	16:45:42	Total	0.0954	1.6355	374.2	232.5	102.1	13:38:36	19:52:48	14:49:27	15:54:39	17:36:45	18:41:57	
10359	138	44	2297 Feb 08	0:46:04	Total	0.0832	1.6578	374.9	233.1	102.8	21:38:37	3:53:31	22:49:31	23:54:40	1:37:28	2:42:37	
10405	138	45	2315 Feb 20	8:42:48	Total	0.0684	1.6853	375.4	233.6	103.6	5:35:06	11:50:30	6:46:00	7:51:00	9:34:36	10:39:36	
10451	138	46	2333 Mar 02	16:30:27	Total	0.0466	1.7259	375.9	234.3	104.5	13:22:30	19:38:24	14:33:18	15:38:12	17:22:42	18:27:36	
10497	138	47	2351 Mar 14	0:12:41	Total	0.0207	1.7744	376.3	234.8	105.1	21:04:32	3:20:50	22:15:17	23:20:08	1:05:14	2:10:05	
10542	138	48	2369 Mar 24	7:44:15	Total	-0.0135	1.7885	376.4	235.1	105.4	4:36:03	10:52:27	5:46:42	6:51:33	8:36:57	9:41:48	
10586	138	49	2387 Apr 04	15:07:51	Total	-0.0541	1.7153	376.2	235.0	104.9	11:59:45	18:15:57	13:10:21	14:15:24	16:00:18	17:05:21	
10631	138	50	2405 Apr 14	22:20:34	Total	-0.1033	1.6262	375.5	234.3	103.0	19:12:49	1:28:19	20:23:25	21:29:04	23:12:04	0:17:43	
10675	138	51	2423 Apr 26	5:25:45	Total	-0.1585	1.5262	374.3	232.8	99.1	2:18:36	8:32:54	3:29:21	4:36:12	6:15:18	7:22:09	
10719	138	52	2441 May 6	12:21:25	Total	-0.2213	1.4123	372.3	230.0	92.2	9:15:16	15:27:34	10:26:25	11:35:19	13:07:31	14:16:25	
10763	138	53	2459 May 17	19:09:13	Total	-0.2904	1.2869	369.4	225.7	80.8	16:04:31	22:13:55	17:16:22	18:28:49	19:49:37	21:02:04	
10805	138	54	2477 May 28	1:49:59	Total	-0.3652	1.1507	365.3	219.6	61.5	22:47:20	4:52:38	0:00:11	1:19:14	2:20:44	3:39:47	
10847	138	55	2495 Jun 08	8:25:20	Total	-0.4447	1.0060	360.0	211.2	12.9	5:25:20	11:25:20	6:39:44	8:18:53	8:31:47	10:10:56	
10888	138	56	2513 Jun 19	14:55:56	Partial	-0.5279	0.8543	353.2	200.0		11:59:20	17:52:32	13:15:56			16:35:56	
10928	138	57	2531 Jun 30	21:23:33	Partial	-0.6134	0.6981	344.9	185.7		18:31:06	0:16:00	19:50:42			22:56:24	
10969	138	58	2549 Jul 11	3:50:12	Partial	-0.7000	0.5398	335.1	167.5		1:02:39	6:37:45	2:26:27			5:13:57	
11011	138	59	2567 Jul 22	10:17:26	Partial	-0.7862	0.3821	323.8	144.4		7:35:32	12:59:20	9:05:14			11:29:38	
11051	138	60	2585 Aug 01	16:45:35	Partial	-0.8717	0.2253	310.8	113.3		14:10:11	19:20:59	15:48:56			17:42:14	
11091	138	61	2603 Aug 13	23:17:51	Partial	-0.9539	0.0746	296.6	66.6		20:49:33	1:46:09	22:44:33			23:51:09	
11131	138	62	2621 Aug 24	5:54:22	Penumbral	-1.0327	-0.0701	281.1			3:33:49	8:14:55					
11172	138	63	2639 Sep 04	12:37:54	Penumbral	-1.1060	-0.2049	264.8			10:25:30	14:50:18					
11213	138	64	2657 Sep 14	19:26:58	Penumbral	-1.1750	-0.3318	247.4			17:23:16	21:30:40					
11256	138	65	2675 Sep 26	2:25:48	Penumbral	-1.2363	-0.4449	229.9			0:30:51	4:20:45					
11299	138	66	2693 Oct 06	9:32:29	Penumbral	-1.2917	-0.5469	212.2			7:46:23	11:18:35					
11342	138	67	2711 Oct 18	16:49:35	Penumbral	-1.3388	-0.6339	195.2			15:11:59	18:27:11					
11384	138	68	2729 Oct 29	0:15:40	Penumbral	-1.3791	-0.7084	178.9			22:46:13	1:45:07					
11426	138	69	2747 Nov 09	7:52:28	Penumbral	-1.4115	-0.7681	164.4			6:30:16	9:14:40					
11470	138	70	2765 Nov 19	15:38:17	Penumbral	-1.4371	-0.8155	151.5			14:22:32	16:54:02					
11514	138	71	2783 Nov 30	23:32:00	Penumbral	-1.4570	-0.8521	140.6			22:21:42	0:42:18					
11560	138	72	2801 Dec 11	7:34:19	Penumbral	-1.4707	-0.8771	132.3			6:28:10	8:40:28					
11607	138	73	2819 Dec 22	15:42:44	Penumbral	-1.4797	-0.8931	126.3			14:39:35	16:45:53					
11654	138	74	2838 Jan 01	23:56:51	Penumbral	-1.4851	-0.9024	122.3			22:55:42	0:58:00					
11700	138	75	2856 Jan 13	8:12:54	Penumbral	-1.4895	-0.9093	118.7			7:13:33	9:12:15					
11746	138	76	2874 Jan 23	16:32:19	Penumbral	-1.4918	-0.9122	116.3			15:34:10	17:30:28					
11792	138	77	2892 Feb 04	0:50:55	Penumbral	-1.4950	-0.9164	113.1			23:54:22	1:47:28					
11837	138	78	2910 Feb 15	9:08:12	Penumbral	-1.4998	-0.9233	108.5			8:13:57	10:02:27					
11882	138	79	2928 Feb 26	17:21:42	Penumbral	-1.5081	-0.9361	101.0			16:31:12	18:12:12					
11927	138	80	2946 Mar 09	1:31:32	Penumbral	-1.5198	-0.9552	89.9			0:46:35	2:16:29					
11973	138	81	2964 Mar 19	9:35:34	Penumbral	-1.5366	-0.9832	71.9			8:59:37	10:11:31					
12018	138	82	2982 Mar 30	17:33:19	Penumbral	-1.5589	-1.0211	37.6			17:14:31	17:52:07					

== See also ==
- List of lunar eclipses
  - List of Saros series for lunar eclipses
