= Solar Saros 145 =

Series of solar eclipses

Total solar eclipse of August 11, 1999, from France, member 21 of Saros series 145

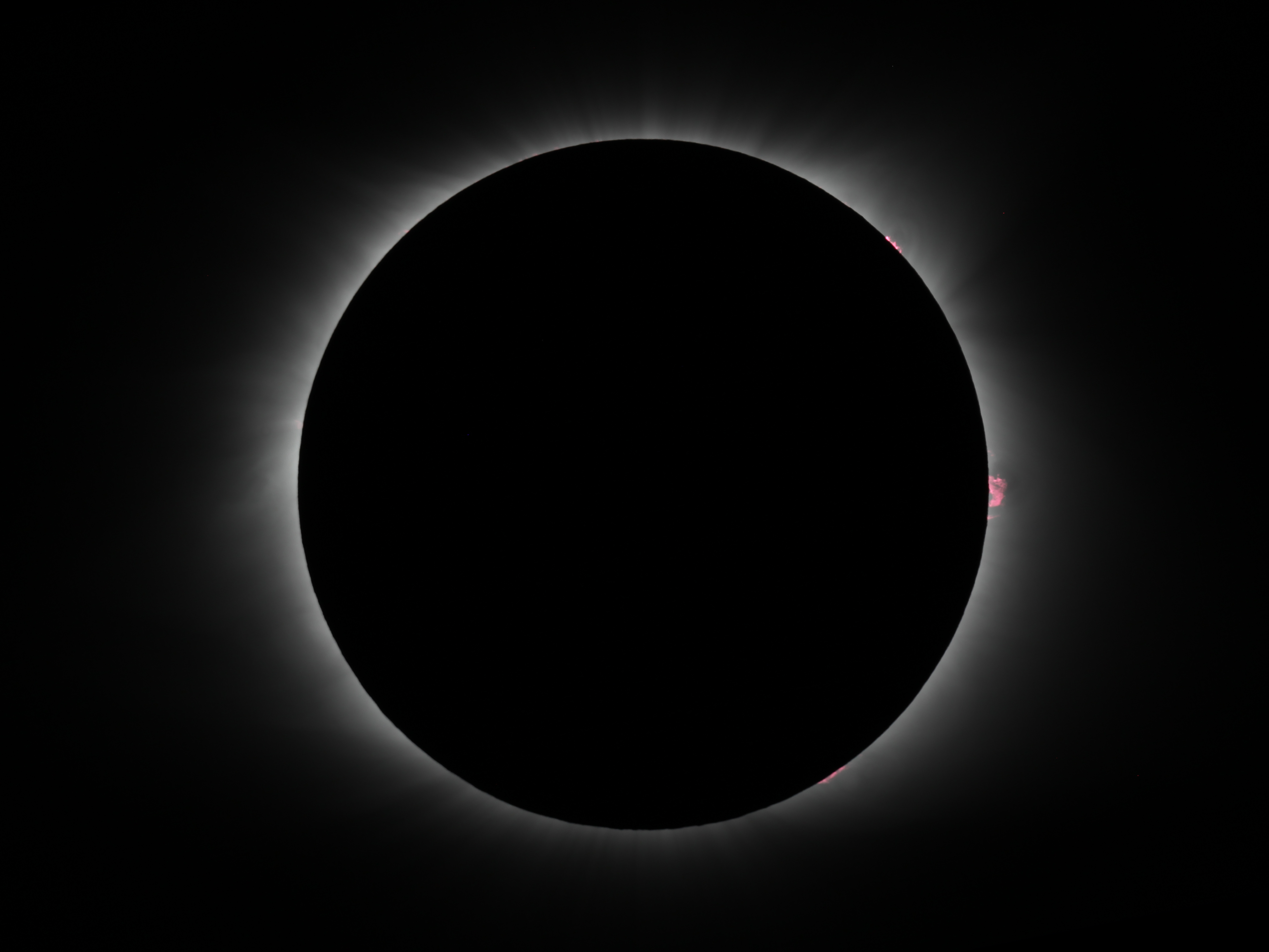
Total solar eclipse of August 21, 2017, from Simpsonville, South Carolina, member 22 of Saros series 145

Animated path of entire Saros.

Saros cycle series 145 for solar eclipses occurs at the Moon's ascending node, repeating every 18 years, 11 days, containing 77 eclipses, 43 of which are umbral (1 annular, 1 hybrid, 41 total). The first eclipse in the series was on 4 January 1639 and the last will be on 17 April 3009. The most recent eclipse was on 21 August 2017 and the next will be on 2 September 2035.

The first umbral eclipse of the series was an annular eclipse on 6 June 1891, followed by a hybrid eclipse on 17 June 1909. Beginning on 29 June 1927 the series produces total eclipses, ending on 9 September 2648. The longest duration eclipse in the cycle will be member 50 at 7 minutes and 12 seconds in length on June 25, 2522.

This solar saros is linked to Lunar Saros 138.

== Umbral eclipses ==
Umbral eclipses (annular, total and hybrid) can be further classified as either: 1) Central (two limits), 2) Central (one limit) or 3) Non-Central (one limit). The statistical distribution of these classes in Saros series 145 appears in the following table.

Classification	Number	Percent
All Umbral eclipses	43	100.00%
Central (two limits)	42	97.67%
Central (one limit)	1	2.33%
Non-central (one limit)	0	0.00%

== All eclipses ==
Saros	Member	Date	Time (Greatest) UTC	Type	Location Lat, Long	Gamma	Mag.	Width (km)	Duration (min:sec)	Ref
145	1	January 4, 1639	4:56:19	Partial	64.6N 80E	1.565	0.0009			
145	2	January 14, 1657	13:08:11	Partial	63.7N 52.7W	1.5547	0.0171			
145	3	January 25, 1675	21:19:48	Partial	62.9N 175.1E	1.5434	0.0346			
145	4	February 5, 1693	5:27:09	Partial	62.2N 44.2E	1.5276	0.0597			
145	5	February 17, 1711	13:30:15	Partial	61.6N 85.4W	1.5077	0.0919			
145	6	February 27, 1729	21:27:02	Partial	61.2N 146.6E	1.4817	0.1347			
145	7	March 11, 1747	5:18:08	Partial	61N 20.2E	1.4504	0.1872			
145	8	March 21, 1765	13:01:45	Partial	61N 104.3W	1.412	0.2524			
145	9	April 1, 1783	20:38:39	Partial	61N 132.8E	1.3671	0.3299			
145	10	April 13, 1801	4:08:06	Partial	61.3N 11.7E	1.3152	0.4208			
145	11	April 24, 1819	11:31:59	Partial	61.7N 108W	1.2579	0.5225			
145	12	May 4, 1837	18:48:28	Partial	62.3N 133.9E	1.1934	0.6381			
145	13	May 16, 1855	2:01:12	Partial	62.9N 16.6E	1.1249	0.7624			
145	14	May 26, 1873	9:08:56	Partial	63.7N 99.6W	1.0513	0.8971			
145	15	June 6, 1891	16:15:36	Annular	74.5N 163.8E	0.9754	0.9981	33	0m 6s	
145	16	June 17, 1909	23:18:38	Hybrid	82.9N 123.6E	0.8957	1.0065	51	0m 24s	
145	17	June 29, 1927	6:23:27	Total	78.1N 73.8E	0.8163	1.0128	77	0m 50s	
145	18	July 9, 1945	13:27:46	Total	70N 17.2W	0.7356	1.018	92	1m 15s	
145	19	July 20, 1963	20:36:13	Total	61.7N 119.6W	0.6571	1.0224	101	1m 40s	
145	20	July 31, 1981	3:46:37	Total	53.3N 134.1E	0.5792	1.0258	108	2m 2s	
145	21	August 11, 1999	11:04:09	Total	45.1N 24.3E	0.5062	1.0286	112	2m 23s	
145	22	August 21, 2017	18:26:40	Total	37N 87.7W	0.4367	1.0306	115	2m 40s	
145	23	September 2, 2035	1:56:46	Total	29.1N 158E	0.3727	1.032	116	2m 54s	
145	24	September 12, 2053	9:34:09	Total	21.5N 41.7E	0.314	1.0328	116	3m 4s	
145	25	September 23, 2071	17:20:28	Total	14.2N 76.7W	0.262	1.0333	116	3m 11s	
145	26	October 4, 2089	1:15:23	Total	7.4N 162.8E	0.2167	1.0333	115	3m 14s	
145	27	October 16, 2107	9:18:27	Total	1.1N 40.6E	0.1778	1.0332	114	3m 16s	
145	28	October 26, 2125	17:30:49	Total	4.5S 83.6W	0.1461	1.0329	112	3m 15s	
145	29	November 7, 2143	1:51:16	Total	9.4S 150.8E	0.1206	1.0326	111	3m 14s	
145	30	November 17, 2161	10:19:30	Total	13.4S 23.6E	0.1012	1.0325	110	3m 13s	
145	31	November 28, 2179	18:54:18	Total	16.5S 104.6W	0.0867	1.0325	110	3m 12s	
145	32	December 9, 2197	3:35:07	Total	18.5S 126E	0.0769	1.0329	111	3m 13s	
145	33	December 21, 2215	12:20:08	Total	19.5S 4.1W	0.0701	1.0336	114	3m 14s	
145	34	December 31, 2233	21:07:37	Total	19.5S 134.7W	0.0649	1.0348	117	3m 18s	
145	35	January 12, 2252	5:57:05	Total	18.5S 94E	0.0608	1.0365	123	3m 23s	
145	36	January 22, 2270	14:46:29	Total	16.7S 37.3W	0.056	1.0385	130	3m 29s	
145	37	February 2, 2288	23:33:47	Total	14.2S 168.4W	0.0492	1.0412	138	3m 39s	
145	38	February 14, 2306	8:17:49	Total	11.3S 61E	0.0394	1.0441	147	3m 49s	
145	39	February 25, 2324	16:57:32	Total	8.1S 68.6W	0.0257	1.0475	158	4m 2s	
145	40	March 8, 2342	1:32:14	Total	4.9S 162.9E	0.0072	1.0511	169	4m 16s	
145	41	March 18, 2360	9:59:22	Total	1.8S 36.4E	-0.0177	1.0549	181	4m 33s	
145	42	March 29, 2378	18:20:23	Total	1.1N 88.6W	-0.048	1.0587	193	4m 51s	
145	43	April 9, 2396	2:33:17	Total	3.4N 148.7E	-0.0851	1.0625	206	5m 12s	
145	44	April 20, 2414	10:39:39	Total	5N 27.7E	-0.1279	1.0661	218	5m 33s	
145	45	April 30, 2432	18:37:31	Total	5.8N 91W	-0.178	1.0694	229	5m 56s	
145	46	May 12, 2450	2:29:44	Total	5.6N 151.7E	-0.233	1.0722	241	6m 19s	
145	47	May 22, 2468	10:15:11	Total	4.2N 36E	-0.2936	1.0744	252	6m 41s	
145	48	June 2, 2486	17:55:28	Total	1.8N 78.7W	-0.3587	1.076	263	6m 59s	
145	49	June 14, 2504	1:31:03	Total	1.9S 167.3E	-0.4278	1.0769	275	7m 10s	
145	50	June 25, 2522	9:03:45	Total	6.6S 53.5E	-0.4991	1.0769	287	7m 12s	
145	51	July 5, 2540	16:34:26	Total	12.4S 60.6W	-0.5722	1.076	300	7m 4s	
145	52	July 17, 2558	0:03:14	Total	19.2S 175W	-0.6466	1.0742	315	6m 43s	
145	53	July 27, 2576	7:32:31	Total	26.9S 69.5E	-0.7203	1.0714	334	6m 12s	
145	54	August 7, 2594	15:02:42	Total	35.6S 47.4W	-0.7928	1.0676	361	5m 32s	
145	55	August 18, 2612	22:35:27	Total	45.2S 166.8W	-0.8629	1.0629	407	4m 45s	
145	56	August 30, 2630	6:10:52	Total	56.1S 68.9E	-0.9302	1.0568	514	3m 53s	
145	57	September 9, 2648	13:51:23	Total (Note: No southern limit)	70.1S 79.1W	-0.9929	1.0479	-	2m 48s	
145	58	September 20, 2666	21:37:07	Partial	72.2S 136E	-1.0506	0.9186			
145	59	October 1, 2684	5:28:03	Partial	72.1S 4.5E	-1.1036	0.8161			
145	60	October 13, 2702	13:25:52	Partial	71.8S 128.5W	-1.1504	0.7261			
145	61	October 23, 2720	21:30:13	Partial	71.2S 97.2E	-1.1917	0.6475			
145	62	November 4, 2738	5:42:27	Partial	70.5S 38.5W	-1.2259	0.5827			
145	63	November 14, 2756	13:59:51	Partial	69.6S 174.9W	-1.2556	0.5271			
145	64	November 25, 2774	22:25:15	Partial	68.6S 47.4E	-1.2785	0.4846			
145	65	December 6, 2792	6:55:37	Partial	67.6S 91W	-1.2973	0.45			
145	66	December 17, 2810	15:31:45	Partial	66.5S 129.7E	-1.3111	0.4248			
145	67	December 28, 2828	0:10:20	Partial	65.4S 9.7W	-1.3228	0.4038			
145	68	January 8, 2847	8:52:24	Partial	64.5S 149.6W	-1.3314	0.3886			
145	69	January 18, 2865	17:34:21	Partial	63.6S 70.9E	-1.3398	0.3737			
145	70	January 30, 2883	2:15:42	Partial	62.8S 68.1W	-1.3484	0.3583			
145	71	February 10, 2901	10:54:17	Partial	62.1S 153.8E	-1.359	0.3395			
145	72	February 21, 2919	19:29:46	Partial	61.7S 16.6E	-1.3716	0.3168			
145	73	March 4, 2937	3:58:34	Partial	61.3S 118.8W	-1.3893	0.2851			
145	74	March 15, 2955	12:21:15	Partial	61.2S 107.5E	-1.4112	0.2456			
145	75	March 25, 2973	20:35:44	Partial	61.2S 24.2W	-1.4393	0.1949			
145	76	April 6, 2991	4:43:03	Partial	61.4S 154.2W	-1.4726	0.1346			
145	77	April 17, 3009	12:39:22	Partial	61.7S 78.6E	-1.5141	0.0596			
