= 1961 lunar eclipse =

Two partial lunar eclipses occurred in 1961:

- 2 March 1961 lunar eclipse
- 26 August 1961 lunar eclipse

== See also ==
- List of 20th-century lunar eclipses
- Lists of lunar eclipses
