= Solar eclipse of August 20, 1952 =

20th-century annular solar eclipse

- Annular eclipse
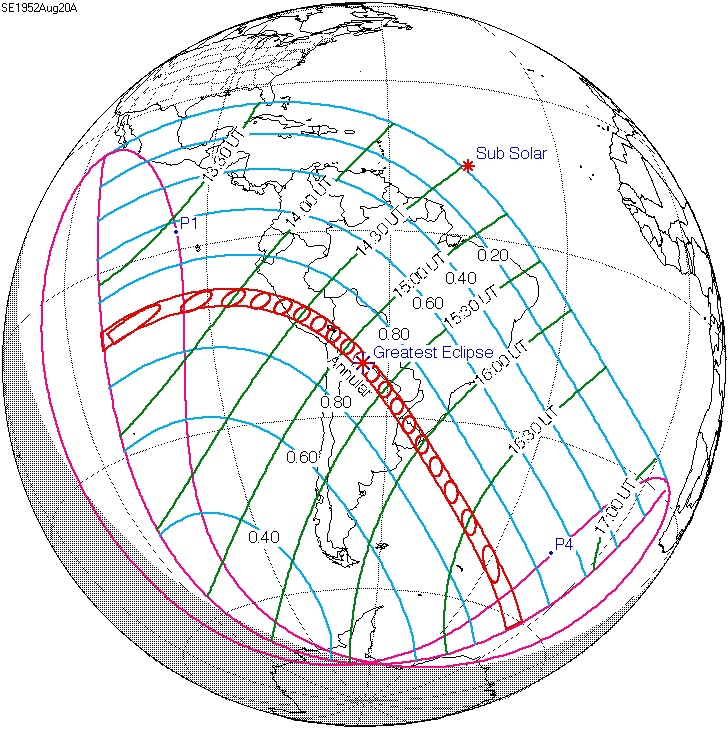
- Map
- Gamma: −0.6102
- Magnitude: 0.942

Maximum eclipse
- Duration: 400 s (6 min 40 s)
- Coordinates: 21.7°S 64.1°W
- Max. width of band: 264 km (164 mi)

Times (UTC)
- Greatest eclipse: 15:13:35

References
- Saros: 144 (13 of 70)
- Catalog # (SE5000): 9403

An annular solar eclipse occurred at the Moon's descending node of orbit on Wednesday, August 20, 1952, with a magnitude of 0.942. A solar eclipse occurs when the Moon passes between Earth and the Sun, thereby totally or partly obscuring the image of the Sun for a viewer on Earth. An annular solar eclipse occurs when the Moon's apparent diameter is smaller than the Sun's, blocking most of the Sun's light and causing the Sun to look like an annulus (ring). An annular eclipse appears as a partial eclipse over a region of the Earth thousands of kilometres wide. Occurring 1.2 days after apogee (on August 19, 1952, at 12:00 UTC), the Moon's apparent diameter was smaller.

Annularity was visible from Peru including the capital city Lima, northeastern Chile, Bolivia including the constitutional capital Sucre and seat of government La Paz, Argentina, Paraguay, southern Brazil and Uruguay. A partial eclipse was visible for most of Central America, the Caribbean, and South America.

== Eclipse details ==
Shown below are two tables displaying details about this particular solar eclipse. The first table outlines times at which the Moon's penumbra or umbra attains the specific parameter, and the second table describes various other parameters pertaining to this eclipse.

August 20, 1952 Solar Eclipse Times
Event	Time (UTC)
First Penumbral External Contact	1952 August 20 at 12:22:27.8 UTC
First Umbral External Contact	1952 August 20 at 13:36:36.8 UTC
First Central Line	1952 August 20 at 13:39:39.7 UTC
First Umbral Internal Contact	1952 August 20 at 13:42:44.8 UTC
Greatest Duration	1952 August 20 at 15:00:09.1 UTC
Greatest Eclipse	1952 August 20 at 15:13:35.2 UTC
Ecliptic Conjunction	1952 August 20 at 15:20:50.2 UTC
Equatorial Conjunction	1952 August 20 at 15:48:35.8 UTC
Last Umbral Internal Contact	1952 August 20 at 16:44:03.7 UTC
Last Central Line	1952 August 20 at 16:47:08.7 UTC
Last Umbral External Contact	1952 August 20 at 16:50:11.3 UTC
Last Penumbral External Contact	1952 August 20 at 18:04:27.3 UTC

August 20, 1952 Solar Eclipse Parameters
Parameter	Value
Eclipse Magnitude	0.94203
Eclipse Obscuration	0.88742
Gamma	−0.61023
Sun Right Ascension	09h58m50.8s
Sun Declination	+12°20'20.6"
Sun Semi-Diameter	15'48.6"
Sun Equatorial Horizontal Parallax	08.7"
Moon Right Ascension	09h57m52.3s
Moon Declination	+11°50'44.7"
Moon Semi-Diameter	14'43.1"
Moon Equatorial Horizontal Parallax	0°54'01.0"
ΔT	30.2 s

== Eclipse season ==
This eclipse is part of an eclipse season, a period, roughly every six months, when eclipses occur. Only two (or occasionally three) eclipse seasons occur each year, and each season lasts about 35 days and repeats just short of six months (173 days) later; thus two full eclipse seasons always occur each year. Either two or three eclipses happen each eclipse season. In the sequence below, each eclipse is separated by a fortnight.

Eclipse season of August 1952
August 5 Ascending node (full moon)	August 20 Descending node (new moon)
Partial lunar eclipse Lunar Saros 118	Annular solar eclipse Solar Saros 144

== Related eclipses ==
=== Eclipses in 1952 ===
- A partial lunar eclipse on February 11.
- A total solar eclipse on February 25.
- A partial lunar eclipse on August 5.
- An annular solar eclipse on August 20.

=== Metonic ===
- Preceded by: Solar eclipse of November 1, 1948
- Followed by: Solar eclipse of June 8, 1956

=== Tzolkinex ===
- Preceded by: Solar eclipse of July 9, 1945
- Followed by: Solar eclipse of October 2, 1959

=== Half-Saros ===
- Preceded by: Lunar eclipse of August 15, 1943
- Followed by: Lunar eclipse of August 26, 1961

=== Tritos ===
- Preceded by: Solar eclipse of September 21, 1941
- Followed by: Solar eclipse of July 20, 1963

=== Solar Saros 144 ===
- Preceded by: Solar eclipse of August 10, 1934
- Followed by: Solar eclipse of August 31, 1970

=== Inex ===
- Preceded by: Solar eclipse of September 10, 1923
- Followed by: Solar eclipse of July 31, 1981

=== Triad ===
- Preceded by: Solar eclipse of October 19, 1865
- Followed by: Solar eclipse of June 21, 2039

=== Solar eclipses of 1950–1953 ===
This eclipse is a member of a semester series. An eclipse in a semester series of solar eclipses repeats approximately every 177 days and 4 hours (a semester) at alternating nodes of the Moon's orbit.

The partial solar eclipse on July 11, 1953 occurs in the next lunar year eclipse set.

Solar eclipse series sets from 1950 to 1953
Ascending node			Descending node		
Saros	Map	Gamma	Saros	Map	Gamma
119	March 18, 1950 Annular (non-central)	0.9988	124	September 12, 1950 Total	0.8903
129	March 7, 1951 Annular	−0.242	134	September 1, 1951 Annular	0.1557
139	February 25, 1952 Total	0.4697	144	August 20, 1952 Annular	−0.6102
149	February 14, 1953 Partial	1.1331	154	August 9, 1953 Partial	−1.344

=== Saros 144 ===
This eclipse is a part of Saros series 144, repeating every 18 years, 11 days, and containing 70 events. The series started with a partial solar eclipse on April 11, 1736. It contains annular eclipses from July 7, 1880 through August 27, 2565. There are no hybrid or total eclipses in this set. The series ends at member 70 as a partial eclipse on May 5, 2980. Its eclipses are tabulated in three columns; every third eclipse in the same column is one exeligmos apart, so they all cast shadows over approximately the same parts of the Earth.

The longest duration of annularity will be produced by member 51 at 9 minutes, 52 seconds on December 29, 2168. All eclipses in this series occur at the Moon’s descending node of orbit.

Series members 5–26 occur between 1801 and 2200:
5	6	7
May 25, 1808	June 5, 1826	June 16, 1844
8	9	10
June 27, 1862	July 7, 1880	July 18, 1898
11	12	13
July 30, 1916	August 10, 1934	August 20, 1952
14	15	16
August 31, 1970	September 11, 1988	September 22, 2006
17	18	19
October 2, 2024	October 14, 2042	October 24, 2060
20	21	22
November 4, 2078	November 15, 2096	November 27, 2114
23	24	25
December 7, 2132	December 19, 2150	December 29, 2168
26
January 9, 2187

=== Metonic series ===
The metonic series repeats eclipses every 19 years (6939.69 days), lasting about 5 cycles. Eclipses occur in nearly the same calendar date. In addition, the octon subseries repeats 1/5 of that or every 3.8 years (1387.94 days). All eclipses in this table occur at the Moon's descending node.

22 eclipse events between March 27, 1884 and August 20, 1971
March 27–29	January 14	November 1–2	August 20–21	June 8
108	110	112	114	116
March 27, 1884			August 20, 1895	June 8, 1899
118	120	122	124	126
March 29, 1903	January 14, 1907	November 2, 1910	August 21, 1914	June 8, 1918
128	130	132	134	136
March 28, 1922	January 14, 1926	November 1, 1929	August 21, 1933	June 8, 1937
138	140	142	144	146
March 27, 1941	January 14, 1945	November 1, 1948	August 20, 1952	June 8, 1956
148	150	152	154	
March 27, 1960	January 14, 1964	November 2, 1967	August 20, 1971	

=== Tritos series ===
This eclipse is a part of a tritos cycle, repeating at alternating nodes every 135 synodic months (≈ 3986.63 days, or 11 years minus 1 month). Their appearance and longitude are irregular due to a lack of synchronization with the anomalistic month (period of perigee), but groupings of 3 tritos cycles (≈ 33 years minus 3 months) come close (≈ 434.044 anomalistic months), so eclipses are similar in these groupings.

The partial solar eclipses on December 7, 2170 (part of Saros 164) and November 7, 2181 (part of Saros 165) are also a part of this series but are not included in the table below.

Series members between 1801 and 2105
September 28, 1810 (Saros 131)	August 27, 1821 (Saros 132)	July 27, 1832 (Saros 133)	June 27, 1843 (Saros 134)	May 26, 1854 (Saros 135)
April 25, 1865 (Saros 136)	March 25, 1876 (Saros 137)	February 22, 1887 (Saros 138)	January 22, 1898 (Saros 139)	December 23, 1908 (Saros 140)
November 22, 1919 (Saros 141)	October 21, 1930 (Saros 142)	September 21, 1941 (Saros 143)	August 20, 1952 (Saros 144)	July 20, 1963 (Saros 145)
June 20, 1974 (Saros 146)	May 19, 1985 (Saros 147)	April 17, 1996 (Saros 148)	March 19, 2007 (Saros 149)	February 15, 2018 (Saros 150)
January 14, 2029 (Saros 151)	December 15, 2039 (Saros 152)	November 14, 2050 (Saros 153)	October 13, 2061 (Saros 154)	September 12, 2072 (Saros 155)
August 13, 2083 (Saros 156)	July 12, 2094 (Saros 157)	June 12, 2105 (Saros 158)		

=== Inex series ===
This eclipse is a part of the long period inex cycle, repeating at alternating nodes, every 358 synodic months (≈ 10,571.95 days, or 29 years minus 20 days). Their appearance and longitude are irregular due to a lack of synchronization with the anomalistic month (period of perigee). However, groupings of 3 inex cycles (≈ 87 years minus 2 months) comes close (≈ 1,151.02 anomalistic months), so eclipses are similar in these groupings.

Series members between 1801 and 2200
November 29, 1807 (Saros 139)	November 9, 1836 (Saros 140)	October 19, 1865 (Saros 141)
September 29, 1894 (Saros 142)	September 10, 1923 (Saros 143)	August 20, 1952 (Saros 144)
July 31, 1981 (Saros 145)	July 11, 2010 (Saros 146)	June 21, 2039 (Saros 147)
May 31, 2068 (Saros 148)	May 11, 2097 (Saros 149)	April 22, 2126 (Saros 150)
April 2, 2155 (Saros 151)	March 12, 2184 (Saros 152)	
