= September 1979 lunar eclipse =

Total lunar eclipse September 6, 1979

- Total eclipse
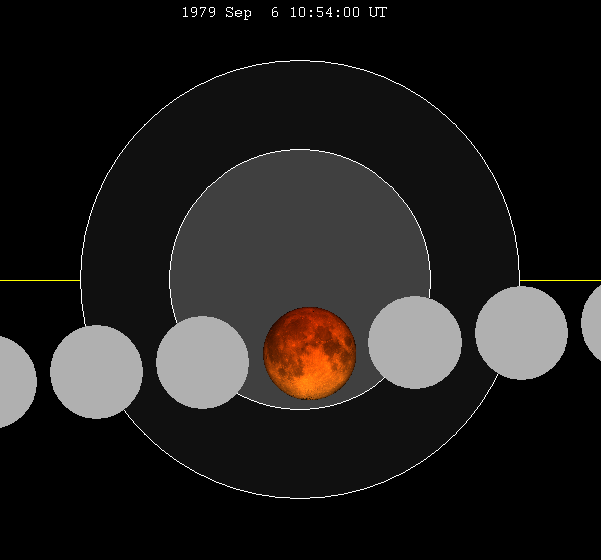
- The Moon's hourly motion shown right to left
- Date: September 6, 1979
- Gamma: −0.4305
- Magnitude: 1.0936
- Saros cycle: 137 (26 of 81)
- Totality: 44 minutes, 25 seconds
- Partiality: 191 minutes, 52 seconds
- Penumbral: 305 minutes, 9 seconds
Contacts (UTC)
- P1: 8:21:37
- U1: 9:18:15
- U2: 10:31:59
- Greatest: 10:54:12
- U3: 11:16:24
- U4: 12:30:08
- P4: 13:26:45

A total lunar eclipse occurred at the Moon’s descending node of orbit on Thursday, September 6, 1979, with an umbral magnitude of 1.0936. A lunar eclipse occurs when the Moon moves into the Earth's shadow, causing the Moon to be darkened. A total lunar eclipse occurs when the Moon's near side entirely passes into the Earth's umbral shadow. Unlike a solar eclipse, which can only be viewed from a relatively small area of the world, a lunar eclipse may be viewed from anywhere on the night side of Earth. A total lunar eclipse can last up to nearly two hours, while a total solar eclipse lasts only a few minutes at any given place, because the Moon's shadow is smaller. Occurring only about 5 hours after perigee (on September 6, 1979, at 6:00 UTC), the Moon's apparent diameter was larger.

== Visibility ==
The eclipse was completely visible over eastern Australia, western North America, and the central and eastern Pacific Ocean, seen rising over the eastern half of Asia and western Australia and setting over North and South America.

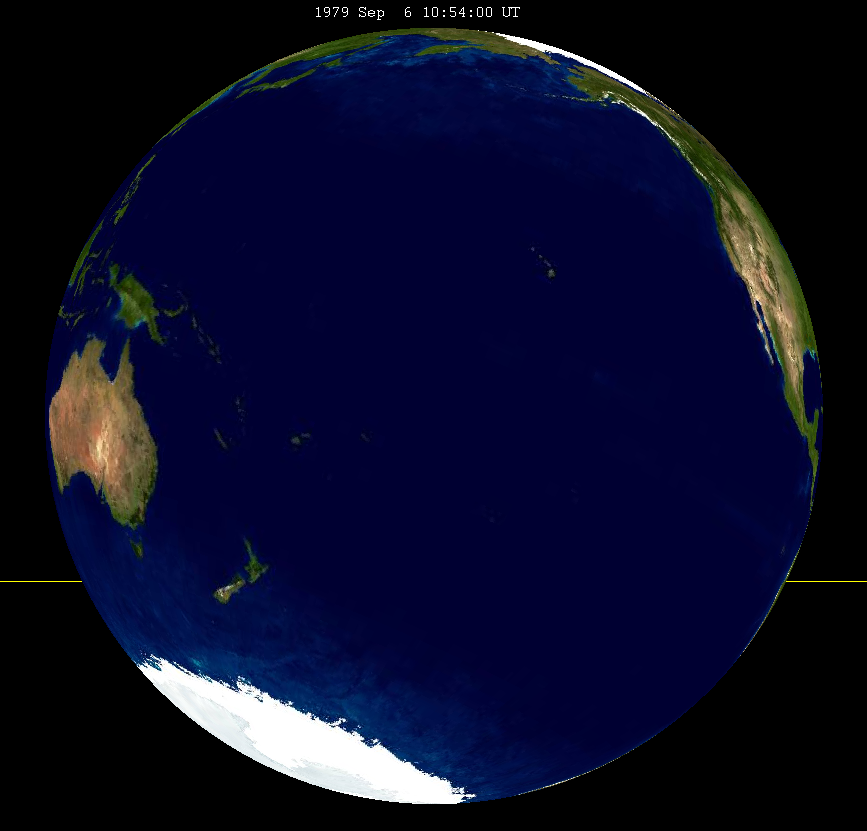
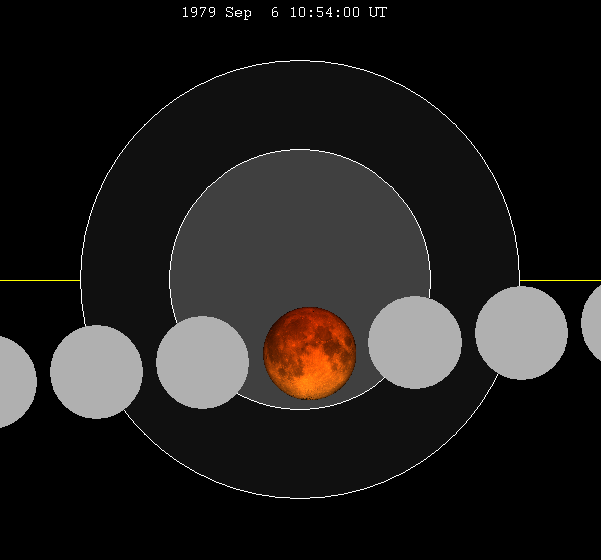

== Eclipse details ==
Shown below is a table displaying details about this particular lunar eclipse. It describes various parameters pertaining to this eclipse.

September 6, 1979 Lunar Eclipse Parameters
Parameter	Value
Penumbral Magnitude	2.04211
Umbral Magnitude	1.09358
Gamma	−0.43050
Sun Right Ascension	10h58m17.1s
Sun Declination	+06°34'46.5"
Sun Semi-Diameter	15'52.1"
Sun Equatorial Horizontal Parallax	08.7"
Moon Right Ascension	22h58m48.1s
Moon Declination	-07°00'03.6"
Moon Semi-Diameter	16'43.7"
Moon Equatorial Horizontal Parallax	1°01'23.8"
ΔT	50.2 s

== Eclipse season ==
This eclipse is part of an eclipse season, a period, roughly every six months, when eclipses occur. Only two (or occasionally three) eclipse seasons occur each year, and each season lasts about 35 days and repeats just short of six months (173 days) later; thus two full eclipse seasons always occur each year. Either two or three eclipses happen each eclipse season. In the sequence below, each eclipse is separated by a fortnight.

Eclipse season of August–September 1979
August 22 Ascending node (new moon)	September 6 Descending node (full moon)
Annular solar eclipse Solar Saros 125	Total lunar eclipse Lunar Saros 137

== Related eclipses ==
=== Eclipses in 1979 ===
- A total solar eclipse on February 26.
- A partial lunar eclipse on March 13.
- An annular solar eclipse on August 22.
- A total lunar eclipse on September 6.

=== Metonic ===
- Preceded by: Lunar eclipse of November 18, 1975
- Followed by: Lunar eclipse of June 25, 1983

=== Tzolkinex ===
- Preceded by: Lunar eclipse of July 26, 1972
- Followed by: Lunar eclipse of October 17, 1986

=== Half-Saros ===
- Preceded by: Solar eclipse of August 31, 1970
- Followed by: Solar eclipse of September 11, 1988

=== Tritos ===
- Preceded by: Lunar eclipse of October 6, 1968
- Followed by: Lunar eclipse of August 6, 1990

=== Lunar Saros 137 ===
- Preceded by: Lunar eclipse of August 26, 1961
- Followed by: Lunar eclipse of September 16, 1997

=== Inex ===
- Preceded by: Lunar eclipse of September 26, 1950
- Followed by: Lunar eclipse of August 16, 2008

=== Triad ===
- Preceded by: Lunar eclipse of November 4, 1892
- Followed by: Lunar eclipse of July 7, 2066

=== Lunar eclipses of 1977–1980 ===
This eclipse is a member of a semester series. An eclipse in a semester series of lunar eclipses repeats approximately every 177 days and 4 hours (a semester) at alternating nodes of the Moon's orbit.

The penumbral lunar eclipse on July 27, 1980 occurs in the next lunar year eclipse set.

Lunar eclipse series sets from 1977 to 1980
Ascending node				Descending node			
Saros	Date Viewing	Type Chart	Gamma	Saros	Date Viewing	Type Chart	Gamma
112	1977 Apr 04	Partial	−0.9148	117	1977 Sep 27	Penumbral	1.0768
122	1978 Mar 24	Total	−0.2140	127	1978 Sep 16	Total	0.2951
132	1979 Mar 13	Partial	0.5254	137	1979 Sep 06	Total	−0.4305
142	1980 Mar 01	Penumbral	1.2270	147	1980 Aug 26	Penumbral	−1.1608

=== Saros 137 ===
This eclipse is a part of Saros series 137, repeating every 18 years, 11 days, and containing 78 events. The series started with a penumbral lunar eclipse on December 17, 1564. It contains partial eclipses from June 10, 1835 through August 26, 1961; total eclipses from September 6, 1979 through June 28, 2466; and a second set of partial eclipses from July 9, 2484 through September 12, 2592. The series ends at member 78 as a penumbral eclipse on April 20, 2953.

The longest duration of totality will be produced by member 44 at 99 minutes, 53 seconds on April 13, 2340. All eclipses in this series occur at the Moon’s descending node of orbit.

Greatest	First			
The greatest eclipse of the series will occur on 2340 Apr 13, lasting 99 minutes, 53 seconds.	Penumbral	Partial	Total	Central
The greatest eclipse of the series will occur on 2340 Apr 13, lasting 99 minutes, 53 seconds.	1564 Dec 17	1835 Jun 10	1979 Sep 06	2051 Oct 19
The greatest eclipse of the series will occur on 2340 Apr 13, lasting 99 minutes, 53 seconds.	Last			
The greatest eclipse of the series will occur on 2340 Apr 13, lasting 99 minutes, 53 seconds.	Central	Total	Partial	Penumbral
The greatest eclipse of the series will occur on 2340 Apr 13, lasting 99 minutes, 53 seconds.	2412 May 26	2466 Jun 28	2592 Sep 12	2953 Apr 20

Eclipses are tabulated in three columns; every third eclipse in the same column is one exeligmos apart, so they all cast shadows over approximately the same parts of the Earth.

Series members 15–36 occur between 1801 and 2200:
15	16	17
1817 May 30	1835 Jun 10	1853 Jun 21
18	19	20
1871 Jul 02	1889 Jul 12	1907 Jul 25
21	22	23
1925 Aug 04	1943 Aug 15	1961 Aug 26
24	25	26
1979 Sep 06	1997 Sep 16	2015 Sep 28
27	28	29
2033 Oct 08	2051 Oct 19	2069 Oct 30
30	31	32
2087 Nov 10	2105 Nov 21	2123 Dec 03
33	34	35
2141 Dec 13	2159 Dec 24	2178 Jan 04
36
2196 Jan 15

=== Tritos series ===
This eclipse is a part of a tritos cycle, repeating at alternating nodes every 135 synodic months (≈ 3986.63 days, or 11 years minus 1 month). Their appearance and longitude are irregular due to a lack of synchronization with the anomalistic month (period of perigee), but groupings of 3 tritos cycles (≈ 33 years minus 3 months) come close (≈ 434.044 anomalistic months), so eclipses are similar in these groupings.

Series members between 1801 and 2187
1805 Jan 15 (Saros 121)	1815 Dec 16 (Saros 122)	1826 Nov 14 (Saros 123)	1837 Oct 13 (Saros 124)	1848 Sep 13 (Saros 125)
1859 Aug 13 (Saros 126)	1870 Jul 12 (Saros 127)	1881 Jun 12 (Saros 128)	1892 May 11 (Saros 129)	1903 Apr 12 (Saros 130)
1914 Mar 12 (Saros 131)	1925 Feb 08 (Saros 132)	1936 Jan 08 (Saros 133)	1946 Dec 08 (Saros 134)	1957 Nov 07 (Saros 135)
1968 Oct 06 (Saros 136)	1979 Sep 06 (Saros 137)	1990 Aug 06 (Saros 138)	2001 Jul 05 (Saros 139)	2012 Jun 04 (Saros 140)
2023 May 05 (Saros 141)	2034 Apr 03 (Saros 142)	2045 Mar 03 (Saros 143)	2056 Feb 01 (Saros 144)	2066 Dec 31 (Saros 145)
2077 Nov 29 (Saros 146)	2088 Oct 30 (Saros 147)	2099 Sep 29 (Saros 148)	2110 Aug 29 (Saros 149)	2121 Jul 30 (Saros 150)
2132 Jun 28 (Saros 151)	2143 May 28 (Saros 152)	2154 Apr 28 (Saros 153)		
2187 Jan 24 (Saros 156)

=== Inex series ===
This eclipse is a part of the long period inex cycle, repeating at alternating nodes, every 358 synodic months (≈ 10,571.95 days, or 29 years minus 20 days). Their appearance and longitude are irregular due to a lack of synchronization with the anomalistic month (period of perigee). However, groupings of 3 inex cycles (≈ 87 years minus 2 months) comes close (≈ 1,151.02 anomalistic months), so eclipses are similar in these groupings.

Series members between 1801 and 2200
1806 Jan 05 (Saros 131)	1834 Dec 16 (Saros 132)	1863 Nov 25 (Saros 133)
1892 Nov 04 (Saros 134)	1921 Oct 16 (Saros 135)	1950 Sep 26 (Saros 136)
1979 Sep 06 (Saros 137)	2008 Aug 16 (Saros 138)	2037 Jul 27 (Saros 139)
2066 Jul 07 (Saros 140)	2095 Jun 17 (Saros 141)	2124 May 28 (Saros 142)
2153 May 08 (Saros 143)	2182 Apr 18 (Saros 144)	

=== Half-Saros cycle ===
A lunar eclipse will be preceded and followed by solar eclipses by 9 years and 5.5 days (a half saros). This lunar eclipse is related to two annular solar eclipses of Solar Saros 144.

August 31, 1970	September 11, 1988

== See also ==
- List of lunar eclipses
- List of 20th-century lunar eclipses
- Solar eclipse of February 26, 1979
