= Lunar Saros 137 =

Series of lunar eclipses

member 26
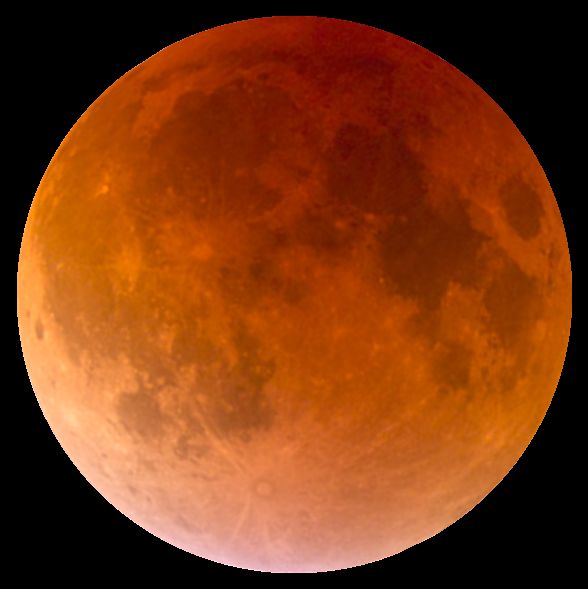
2015 Sep 28

Saros cycle series 137 for lunar eclipses occurs at the moon's descending node, repeats every 18 years 11 and 1/3 days. It contains 78 events.

Cat.	Saros	Mem	Date	Time UT (hr:mn)	Type	Gamma	Magnitude	Duration (min)			Contacts UT (hr:mn)						Chart
Cat.	Saros	Mem	Date	Greatest	Type	Gamma	Magnitude	Pen.	Par.	Tot.	P1	P4	U1	U2	U3	U4	Chart
08582	137	1	1564 Dec 17	21:16:37	Penumbral	-1.5587	-1.0109	23.0			21:05:07	21:28:07					
08625	137	2	1583 Jan 08	5:55:04	Penumbral	-1.5513	-0.9958	38.4			5:35:52	6:14:16					
08668	137	3	1601 Jan 18	14:32:25	Penumbral	-1.5425	-0.9777	50.9			14:06:58	14:57:52					
08713	137	4	1619 Jan 29	23:07:09	Penumbral	-1.5311	-0.9547	63.5			22:35:24	23:38:54					
08757	137	5	1637 Feb 09	7:38:45	Penumbral	-1.5164	-0.9256	76.7			7:00:24	8:17:06					
08801	137	6	1655 Feb 20	16:03:56	Penumbral	-1.4962	-0.8860	91.8			15:18:02	16:49:50					
08846	137	7	1673 Mar 03	0:24:02	Penumbral	-1.4715	-0.8381	107.2			23:30:26	1:17:38					
08892	137	8	1691 Mar 14	8:36:44	Penumbral	-1.4403	-0.7780	123.8			7:34:50	9:38:38					
08938	137	9	1709 Mar 25	16:43:34	Penumbral	-1.4038	-0.7084	140.3			15:33:25	17:53:43					
08985	137	10	1727 Apr 06	0:41:54	Penumbral	-1.3596	-0.6247	157.4			23:23:12	2:00:36					
09031	137	11	1745 Apr 16	8:34:55	Penumbral	-1.3106	-0.5321	173.9			7:07:58	10:01:52					
09078	137	12	1763 Apr 27	16:20:38	Penumbral	-1.2552	-0.4281	190.1			14:45:35	17:55:41					
09124	137	13	1781 May 8	0:01:08	Penumbral	-1.1949	-0.3152	205.6			22:18:20	1:43:56					
09169	137	14	1799 May 19	7:36:00	Penumbral	-1.1294	-0.1930	220.3			5:45:51	9:26:09					
09214	137	15	1817 May 30	15:07:30	Penumbral	-1.0607	-0.0652	233.9			13:10:33	17:04:27					
09260	137	16	1835 Jun 10	22:35:53	Partial	-0.9888	0.0681	246.4	56.8		20:32:41	0:39:05	22:07:29			23:04:17	
09306	137	17	1853 Jun 21	6:01:48	Partial	-0.9146	0.2056	257.8	96.7		3:52:54	8:10:42	5:13:27			6:50:09	
09350	137	18	1871 Jul 02	13:27:48	Partial	-0.8401	0.3432	267.9	122.4		11:13:51	15:41:45	12:26:36			14:29:00	
09393	137	19	1889 Jul 12	20:53:52	Partial	-0.7654	0.4807	276.8	141.7		18:35:28	23:12:16	19:43:01			22:04:43	
09436	137	20	1907 Jul 25	4:22:27	Partial	-0.6924	0.6149	284.5	156.8		2:00:12	6:44:42	3:04:03			5:40:51	
09478	137	21	1925 Aug 04	11:52:57	Partial	-0.6208	0.7463	291.2	168.9		9:27:21	14:18:33	10:28:30			13:17:24	
09520	137	22	1943 Aug 15	19:28:46	Partial	-0.5533	0.8697	296.7	178.4		17:00:25	21:57:07	17:59:34			20:57:58	
09561	137	23	1961 Aug 26	3:08:51	Partial	-0.4894	0.9863	301.4	186.0		0:38:09	5:39:33	1:35:51			4:41:51	
09602	137	24	1979 Sep 06	10:55:02	Total	-0.4305	1.0936	305.1	191.9	44.4	8:22:29	13:27:35	9:19:05	10:32:50	11:17:14	12:30:59	
09643	137	25	1997 Sep 16	18:47:42	Total	-0.3768	1.1909	308.2	196.4	61.5	16:13:36	21:21:48	17:09:30	18:16:57	19:18:27	20:25:54	
09685	137	26	2015 Sep 28	2:48:17	Total	-0.3296	1.2764	310.7	199.9	71.9	0:12:56	5:23:38	1:08:20	2:12:20	3:24:14	4:28:14	
09726	137	27	2033 Oct 08	10:56:23	Total	-0.2889	1.3497	312.6	202.4	78.8	8:20:05	13:32:41	9:15:11	10:16:59	11:35:47	12:37:35	
09766	137	28	2051 Oct 19	19:11:50	Total	-0.2542	1.4118	314.2	204.3	83.6	16:34:44	21:48:56	17:29:41	18:30:02	19:53:38	20:53:59	
09807	137	29	2069 Oct 30	3:35:06	Total	-0.2263	1.4616	315.4	205.6	86.8	0:57:24	6:12:48	1:52:18	2:51:42	4:18:30	5:17:54	
09848	137	30	2087 Nov 10	12:05:33	Total	-0.2043	1.5006	316.4	206.6	88.9	9:27:21	14:43:45	10:22:15	11:21:06	12:50:00	13:48:51	
09890	137	31	2105 Nov 21	20:42:00	Total	-0.1874	1.5301	317.3	207.3	90.4	18:03:21	23:20:39	18:58:21	19:56:48	21:27:12	22:25:39	
09932	137	32	2123 Dec 03	5:24:09	Total	-0.1755	1.5507	318.0	207.7	91.4	2:45:09	8:03:09	3:40:18	4:38:27	6:09:51	7:08:00	
09975	137	33	2141 Dec 13	14:10:16	Total	-0.1671	1.5652	318.7	208.1	92.0	11:30:55	16:49:37	12:26:13	13:24:16	14:56:16	15:54:19	
10019	137	34	2159 Dec 24	23:00:09	Total	-0.1619	1.5737	319.2	208.4	92.4	20:20:33	1:39:45	21:15:57	22:13:57	23:46:21	0:44:21	
10062	137	35	2178 Jan 04	7:50:14	Total	-0.1570	1.5820	319.8	208.8	92.8	5:10:20	10:30:08	6:05:50	7:03:50	8:36:38	9:34:38	
10105	137	36	2196 Jan 15	16:41:55	Total	-0.1537	1.5877	320.3	209.1	93.1	14:01:46	19:22:04	14:57:22	15:55:22	17:28:28	18:26:28	
10149	137	37	2214 Jan 27	1:30:46	Total	-0.1480	1.5979	320.9	209.5	93.6	22:50:19	4:11:13	23:46:01	0:43:58	2:17:34	3:15:31	
10193	137	38	2232 Feb 07	10:17:44	Total	-0.1410	1.6106	321.5	210.0	94.1	7:36:59	12:58:29	8:32:44	9:30:41	11:04:47	12:02:44	
10239	137	39	2250 Feb 17	18:58:32	Total	-0.1291	1.6326	322.2	210.7	95.0	16:17:26	21:39:38	17:13:11	18:11:02	19:46:02	20:43:53	
10285	137	40	2268 Feb 29	3:35:27	Total	-0.1142	1.6602	322.9	211.4	96.0	0:54:00	6:16:54	1:49:45	2:47:27	4:23:27	5:21:09	
10331	137	41	2286 Mar 11	12:04:37	Total	-0.0929	1.6996	323.7	212.3	97.2	9:22:46	14:46:28	10:18:28	11:16:01	12:53:13	13:50:46	
10377	137	42	2304 Mar 22	20:26:42	Total	-0.0661	1.7491	324.6	213.1	98.4	17:44:24	23:09:00	18:40:09	19:37:30	21:15:54	22:13:15	
10423	137	43	2322 Apr 03	4:39:45	Total	-0.0323	1.8116	325.4	213.9	99.4	1:57:03	7:22:27	2:52:48	3:50:03	5:29:27	6:26:42	
10469	137	44	2340 Apr 13	12:45:17	Total	0.0074	1.8576	326.1	214.5	99.9	10:02:14	15:28:20	10:58:02	11:55:20	13:35:14	14:32:32	
10514	137	45	2358 Apr 24	20:41:46	Total	0.0542	1.7720	326.7	214.8	99.5	17:58:25	23:25:07	18:54:22	19:52:01	21:31:31	22:29:10	
10559	137	46	2376 May 5	4:29:55	Total	0.1074	1.6744	326.9	214.4	97.8	1:46:28	7:13:22	2:42:43	3:41:01	5:18:49	6:17:07	
10603	137	47	2394 May 16	12:10:00	Total	0.1667	1.5656	326.6	213.3	94.3	9:26:42	14:53:18	10:23:21	11:22:51	12:57:09	13:56:39	
10649	137	48	2412 May 26	19:43:25	Total	0.2306	1.4479	325.8	211.1	88.2	17:00:31	22:26:19	17:57:52	18:59:19	20:27:31	21:28:58	
10693	137	49	2430 Jun 07	3:09:30	Total	0.3000	1.3201	324.3	207.7	78.4	0:27:21	5:51:39	1:25:39	2:30:18	3:48:42	4:53:21	
10737	137	50	2448 Jun 17	10:30:31	Total	0.3730	1.1854	322.0	202.8	62.6	7:49:31	13:11:31	8:49:07	9:59:13	11:01:49	12:11:55	
10780	137	51	2466 Jun 28	17:46:38	Total	0.4490	1.0448	318.7	196.2	32.2	15:07:17	20:25:59	16:08:32	17:30:32	18:02:44	19:24:44	
10822	137	52	2484 Jul 09	1:00:42	Partial	0.5260	0.9021	314.5	187.6		22:23:27	3:37:57	23:26:54			2:34:30	
10863	137	53	2502 Jul 21	8:11:07	Partial	0.6051	0.7554	309.2	176.6		5:36:31	10:45:43	6:42:49			9:39:25	
10904	137	54	2520 Jul 31	15:22:37	Partial	0.6822	0.6120	303.0	163.3		12:51:07	17:54:07	14:00:58			16:44:16	
10944	137	55	2538 Aug 11	22:33:32	Partial	0.7588	0.4693	295.7	146.7		20:05:41	1:01:23	21:20:11			23:46:53	
10986	137	56	2556 Aug 22	5:48:05	Partial	0.8315	0.3334	287.8	126.6		3:24:11	8:11:59	4:44:47			6:51:23	
11027	137	57	2574 Sep 02	13:03:42	Partial	0.9023	0.2008	278.9	100.5		10:44:15	15:23:09	12:13:27			13:53:57	
11067	137	58	2592 Sep 12	20:25:19	Partial	0.9671	0.0791	269.7	64.3		18:10:28	22:40:10	19:53:10			20:57:28	
11107	137	59	2610 Sep 25	3:50:47	Penumbral	1.0277	-0.0350	260.2			1:40:41	6:00:53					
11147	137	60	2628 Oct 05	11:22:30	Penumbral	1.0821	-0.1379	250.7			9:17:09	13:27:51					
11188	137	61	2646 Oct 16	19:00:12	Penumbral	1.1308	-0.2304	241.4			16:59:30	21:00:54					
11230	137	62	2664 Oct 27	2:45:20	Penumbral	1.1726	-0.3102	232.7			0:48:59	4:41:41					
11273	137	63	2682 Nov 07	10:37:27	Penumbral	1.2077	-0.3776	225.0			8:44:57	12:29:57					
11315	137	64	2700 Nov 18	18:35:06	Penumbral	1.2375	-0.4352	218.0			16:46:06	20:24:06					
11358	137	65	2718 Nov 30	2:39:40	Penumbral	1.2608	-0.4808	212.5			0:53:25	4:25:55					
11400	137	66	2736 Dec 10	10:49:08	Penumbral	1.2799	-0.5183	207.8			9:05:14	12:33:02					
11443	137	67	2754 Dec 21	19:03:15	Penumbral	1.2944	-0.5472	204.3			17:21:06	20:45:24					
11487	137	68	2773 Jan 01	3:19:29	Penumbral	1.3067	-0.5717	201.3			1:38:50	5:00:08					
11532	137	69	2791 Jan 12	11:38:09	Penumbral	1.3165	-0.5914	198.9			9:58:42	13:17:36					
11578	137	70	2809 Jan 22	19:56:13	Penumbral	1.3263	-0.6107	196.3			18:18:04	21:34:22					
11625	137	71	2827 Feb 03	4:12:29	Penumbral	1.3371	-0.6314	193.2			2:35:53	5:49:05					
11672	137	72	2845 Feb 13	12:25:13	Penumbral	1.3502	-0.6561	188.9			10:50:46	13:59:40					
11718	137	73	2863 Feb 24	20:33:14	Penumbral	1.3665	-0.6864	183.1			19:01:41	22:04:47					
11764	137	74	2881 Mar 07	4:34:07	Penumbral	1.3878	-0.7256	174.7			3:06:46	6:01:28					
11810	137	75	2899 Mar 18	12:27:24	Penumbral	1.4146	-0.7748	163.0			11:05:54	13:48:54					
11855	137	76	2917 Mar 29	20:11:52	Penumbral	1.4477	-0.8350	146.6			18:58:34	21:25:10					
11900	137	77	2935 Apr 10	3:47:50	Penumbral	1.4869	-0.9066	123.4			2:46:08	4:49:32					
11945	137	78	2953 Apr 20	11:12:26	Penumbral	1.5341	-0.9928	86.0			10:29:26	11:55:26					

== See also ==
- List of lunar eclipses
  - List of Saros series for lunar eclipses
