= September 1997 lunar eclipse =

Total lunar eclipse September 16, 1997

- Total eclipse
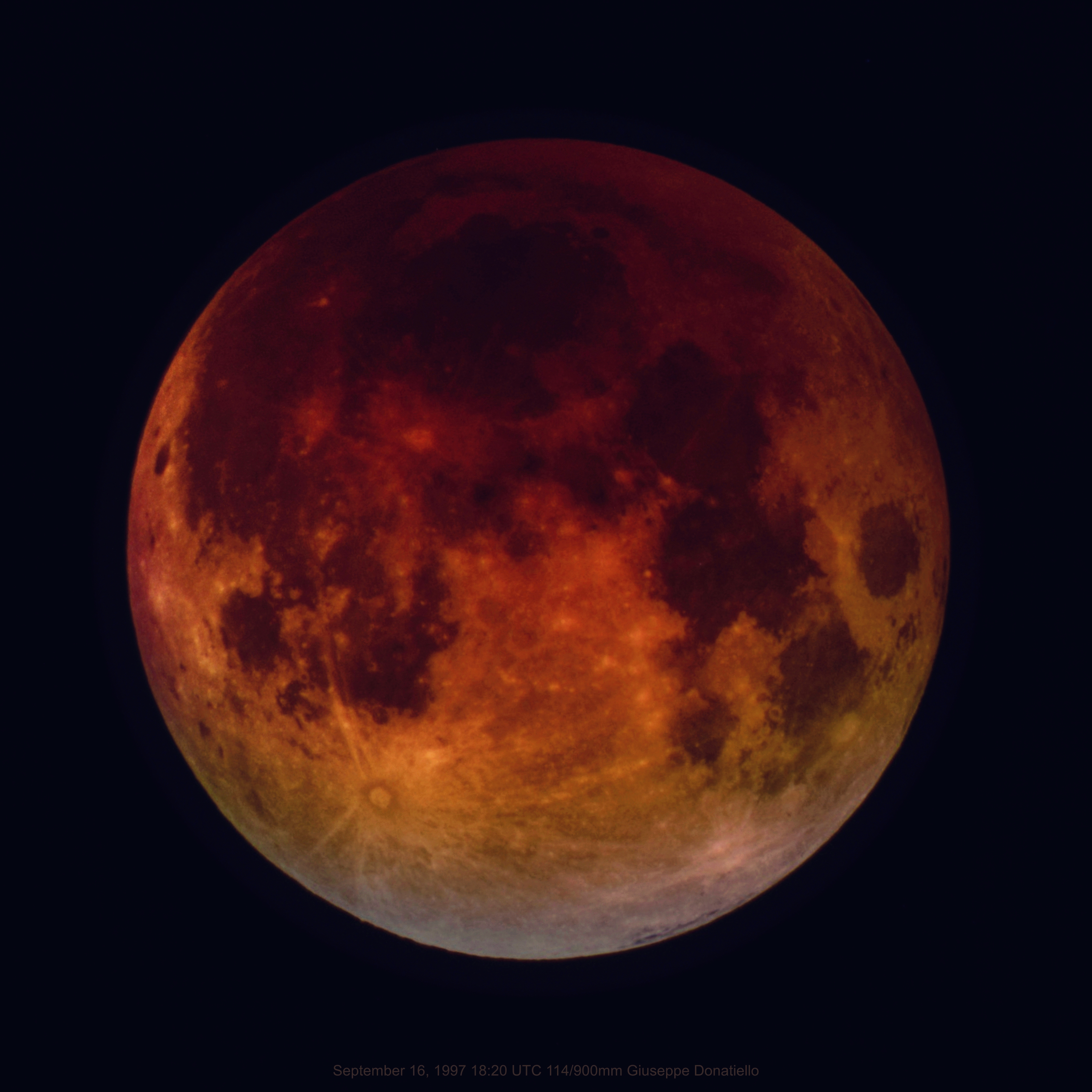
- Totality as viewed from Oria, Italy at 18:20 UTC
- Date: September 16, 1997
- Gamma: −0.3768
- Magnitude: 1.1909
- Saros cycle: 137 (27 of 81)
- Totality: 61 minutes, 31 seconds
- Partiality: 196 minutes, 26 seconds
- Penumbral: 308 minutes, 14 seconds
Contacts (UTC)
- P1: 16:12:32
- U1: 17:08:25
- U2: 18:15:54
- Greatest: 18:46:39
- U3: 19:17:24
- U4: 20:24:52
- P4: 21:20:46

A total lunar eclipse occurred at the Moon’s descending node of orbit on Tuesday, September 16, 1997, with an umbral magnitude of 1.1909. A lunar eclipse occurs when the Moon moves into the Earth's shadow, causing the Moon to be darkened. A total lunar eclipse occurs when the Moon's near side entirely passes into the Earth's umbral shadow. Unlike a solar eclipse, which can only be viewed from a relatively small area of the world, a lunar eclipse may be viewed from anywhere on the night side of Earth. A total lunar eclipse can last up to nearly two hours, while a total solar eclipse lasts only a few minutes at any given place, because the Moon's shadow is smaller. Occurring only about 2.5 hours after perigee (on September 16, 1997, at 16:20 UTC), the Moon's apparent diameter was larger.

This lunar eclipse was the last of an almost tetrad, with the others being on April 4, 1996 (total); September 27, 1996 (total); and March 24, 1997 (partial).

== Visibility ==
The eclipse was completely visible over east Africa, eastern Europe, much of Asia, and western Australia, seen rising over eastern South America, western Europe, and west and central Africa and setting over northeast Asia and eastern Australia.

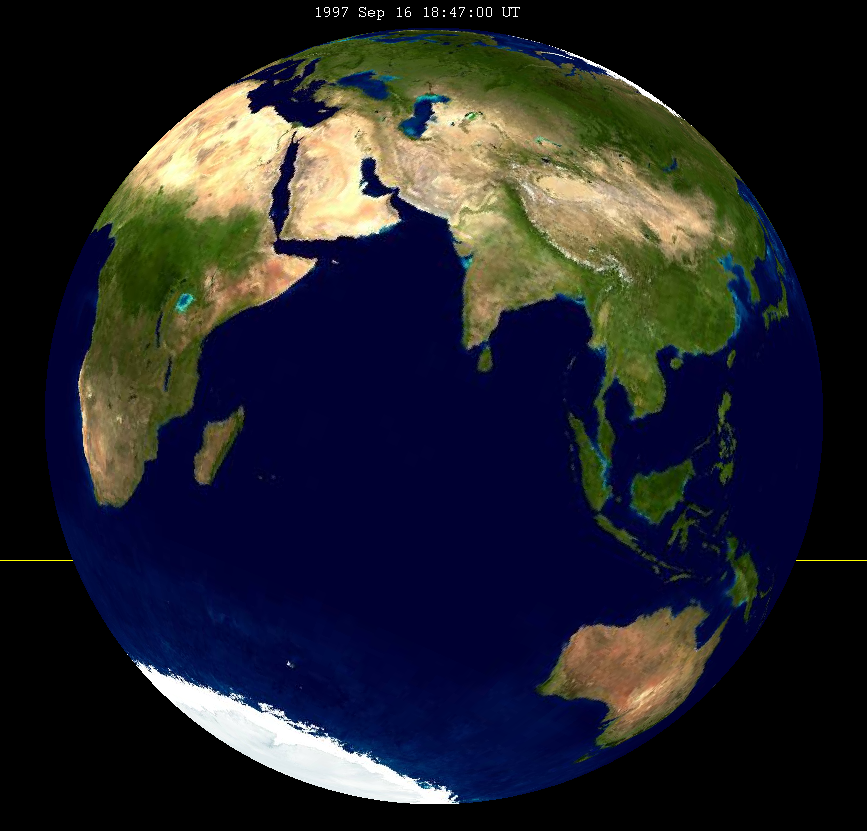
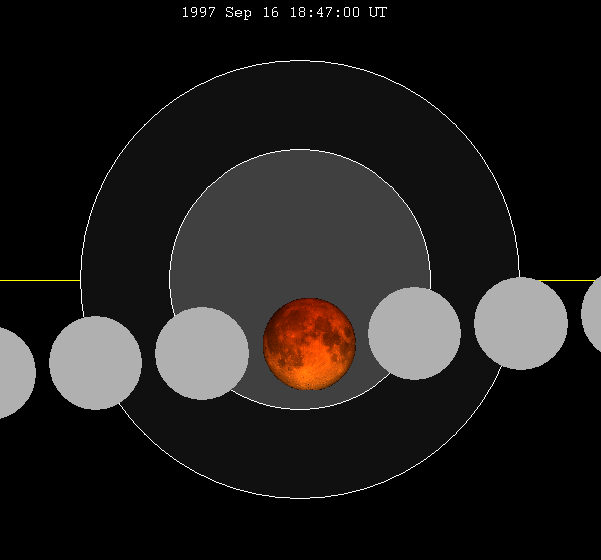

== Eclipse details ==
Shown below is a table displaying details about this particular lunar eclipse. It describes various parameters pertaining to this eclipse.

September 16, 1997 Lunar Eclipse Parameters
Parameter	Value
Penumbral Magnitude	2.14167
Umbral Magnitude	1.19094
Gamma	−0.37684
Sun Right Ascension	11h37m42.6s
Sun Declination	+02°24'38.0"
Sun Semi-Diameter	15'54.7"
Sun Equatorial Horizontal Parallax	08.7"
Moon Right Ascension	23h38m10.7s
Moon Declination	-02°46'41.1"
Moon Semi-Diameter	16'44.2"
Moon Equatorial Horizontal Parallax	1°01'25.5"
ΔT	62.7 s

== Eclipse season ==
This eclipse is part of an eclipse season, a period, roughly every six months, when eclipses occur. Only two (or occasionally three) eclipse seasons occur each year, and each season lasts about 35 days and repeats just short of six months (173 days) later; thus two full eclipse seasons always occur each year. Either two or three eclipses happen each eclipse season. In the sequence below, each eclipse is separated by a fortnight.

Eclipse season of September 1997
September 2 Ascending node (new moon)	September 16 Descending node (full moon)
Partial solar eclipse Solar Saros 125	Total lunar eclipse Lunar Saros 137

== Related eclipses ==
=== Eclipses in 1997 ===
- A total solar eclipse on March 9.
- A partial lunar eclipse on March 24.
- A partial solar eclipse on September 2.
- A total lunar eclipse on September 16.

=== Metonic ===
- Preceded by: Lunar eclipse of November 29, 1993
- Followed by: Lunar eclipse of July 5, 2001

=== Tzolkinex ===
- Preceded by: Lunar eclipse of August 6, 1990
- Followed by: Lunar eclipse of October 28, 2004

=== Half-Saros ===
- Preceded by: Solar eclipse of September 11, 1988
- Followed by: Solar eclipse of September 22, 2006

=== Tritos ===
- Preceded by: Lunar eclipse of October 17, 1986
- Followed by: Lunar eclipse of August 16, 2008

=== Lunar Saros 137 ===
- Preceded by: Lunar eclipse of September 6, 1979
- Followed by: Lunar eclipse of September 28, 2015

=== Inex ===
- Preceded by: Lunar eclipse of October 6, 1968
- Followed by: Lunar eclipse of August 28, 2026

=== Triad ===
- Preceded by: Lunar eclipse of November 17, 1910
- Followed by: Lunar eclipse of July 17, 2084

=== Lunar eclipses of 1995–1998 ===
This eclipse is a member of a semester series. An eclipse in a semester series of lunar eclipses repeats approximately every 177 days and 4 hours (a semester) at alternating nodes of the Moon's orbit.

The penumbral lunar eclipse on August 8, 1998 occurs in the next lunar year eclipse set.

Lunar eclipse series sets from 1995 to 1998
Ascending node				Descending node			
Saros	Date Viewing	Type Chart	Gamma	Saros	Date Viewing	Type Chart	Gamma
112	1995 Apr 15	Partial	−0.9594	117	1995 Oct 08	Penumbral	1.1179
122	1996 Apr 04	Total	−0.2534	127	1996 Sep 27	Total	0.3426
132	1997 Mar 24	Partial	0.4899	137	1997 Sep 16	Total	−0.3768
142	1998 Mar 13	Penumbral	1.1964	147	1998 Sep 06	Penumbral	−1.1058

=== Saros 137 ===
This eclipse is a part of Saros series 137, repeating every 18 years, 11 days, and containing 78 events. The series started with a penumbral lunar eclipse on December 17, 1564. It contains partial eclipses from June 10, 1835 through August 26, 1961; total eclipses from September 6, 1979 through June 28, 2466; and a second set of partial eclipses from July 9, 2484 through September 12, 2592. The series ends at member 78 as a penumbral eclipse on April 20, 2953.

The longest duration of totality will be produced by member 44 at 99 minutes, 53 seconds on April 13, 2340. All eclipses in this series occur at the Moon’s descending node of orbit.

Greatest	First			
The greatest eclipse of the series will occur on 2340 Apr 13, lasting 99 minutes, 53 seconds.	Penumbral	Partial	Total	Central
The greatest eclipse of the series will occur on 2340 Apr 13, lasting 99 minutes, 53 seconds.	1564 Dec 17	1835 Jun 10	1979 Sep 06	2051 Oct 19
The greatest eclipse of the series will occur on 2340 Apr 13, lasting 99 minutes, 53 seconds.	Last			
The greatest eclipse of the series will occur on 2340 Apr 13, lasting 99 minutes, 53 seconds.	Central	Total	Partial	Penumbral
The greatest eclipse of the series will occur on 2340 Apr 13, lasting 99 minutes, 53 seconds.	2412 May 26	2466 Jun 28	2592 Sep 12	2953 Apr 20

Eclipses are tabulated in three columns; every third eclipse in the same column is one exeligmos apart, so they all cast shadows over approximately the same parts of the Earth.

Series members 15–36 occur between 1801 and 2200:
15	16	17
1817 May 30	1835 Jun 10	1853 Jun 21
18	19	20
1871 Jul 02	1889 Jul 12	1907 Jul 25
21	22	23
1925 Aug 04	1943 Aug 15	1961 Aug 26
24	25	26
1979 Sep 06	1997 Sep 16	2015 Sep 28
27	28	29
2033 Oct 08	2051 Oct 19	2069 Oct 30
30	31	32
2087 Nov 10	2105 Nov 21	2123 Dec 03
33	34	35
2141 Dec 13	2159 Dec 24	2178 Jan 04
36
2196 Jan 15

=== Tritos series ===
This eclipse is a part of a tritos cycle, repeating at alternating nodes every 135 synodic months (≈ 3986.63 days, or 11 years minus 1 month). Their appearance and longitude are irregular due to a lack of synchronization with the anomalistic month (period of perigee), but groupings of 3 tritos cycles (≈ 33 years minus 3 months) come close (≈ 434.044 anomalistic months), so eclipses are similar in these groupings.

Series members between 1801 and 2200
1801 Mar 30 (Saros 119)	1812 Feb 27 (Saros 120)	1823 Jan 26 (Saros 121)	1833 Dec 26 (Saros 122)	1844 Nov 24 (Saros 123)
1855 Oct 25 (Saros 124)	1866 Sep 24 (Saros 125)	1877 Aug 23 (Saros 126)	1888 Jul 23 (Saros 127)	1899 Jun 23 (Saros 128)
1910 May 24 (Saros 129)	1921 Apr 22 (Saros 130)	1932 Mar 22 (Saros 131)	1943 Feb 20 (Saros 132)	1954 Jan 19 (Saros 133)
1964 Dec 19 (Saros 134)	1975 Nov 18 (Saros 135)	1986 Oct 17 (Saros 136)	1997 Sep 16 (Saros 137)	2008 Aug 16 (Saros 138)
2019 Jul 16 (Saros 139)	2030 Jun 15 (Saros 140)	2041 May 16 (Saros 141)	2052 Apr 14 (Saros 142)	2063 Mar 14 (Saros 143)
2074 Feb 11 (Saros 144)	2085 Jan 10 (Saros 145)	2095 Dec 11 (Saros 146)	2106 Nov 11 (Saros 147)	2117 Oct 10 (Saros 148)
2128 Sep 09 (Saros 149)	2139 Aug 10 (Saros 150)	2150 Jul 09 (Saros 151)	2161 Jun 08 (Saros 152)	2172 May 08 (Saros 153)
	2194 Mar 07 (Saros 155)			

=== Inex series ===
This eclipse is a part of the long period inex cycle, repeating at alternating nodes, every 358 synodic months (≈ 10,571.95 days, or 29 years minus 20 days). Their appearance and longitude are irregular due to a lack of synchronization with the anomalistic month (period of perigee). However, groupings of 3 inex cycles (≈ 87 years minus 2 months) comes close (≈ 1,151.02 anomalistic months), so eclipses are similar in these groupings.

Series members between 1801 and 2200
1824 Jan 16 (Saros 131)	1852 Dec 26 (Saros 132)	1881 Dec 05 (Saros 133)
1910 Nov 17 (Saros 134)	1939 Oct 28 (Saros 135)	1968 Oct 06 (Saros 136)
1997 Sep 16 (Saros 137)	2026 Aug 28 (Saros 138)	2055 Aug 07 (Saros 139)
2084 Jul 17 (Saros 140)	2113 Jun 29 (Saros 141)	2142 Jun 08 (Saros 142)
2171 May 19 (Saros 143)	2200 Apr 30 (Saros 144)	

=== Half-Saros cycle ===
A lunar eclipse will be preceded and followed by solar eclipses by 9 years and 5.5 days (a half saros). This lunar eclipse is related to two annular solar eclipses of Solar Saros 144.

September 11, 1988	September 22, 2006

== See also ==
- List of lunar eclipses
- List of 20th-century lunar eclipses
