= October 2051 lunar eclipse =

Central lunar eclipse

- Total eclipse
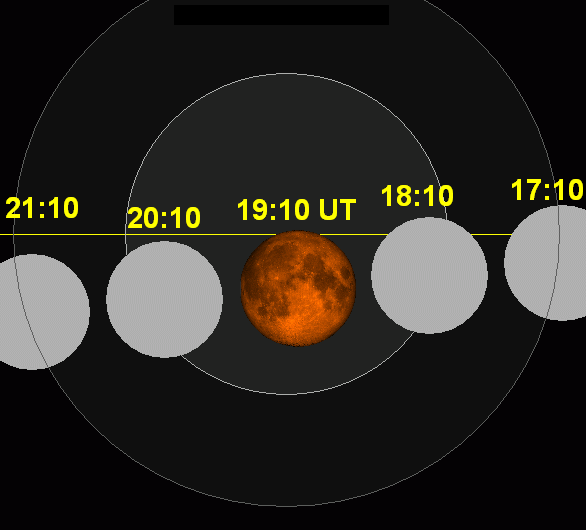
- The Moon's hourly motion shown right to left
- Date: October 19, 2051
- Gamma: −0.2542
- Magnitude: 1.4130
- Saros cycle: 137 (28 of 78)
- Totality: 83 minutes, 34 seconds
- Partiality: 204 minutes, 17 seconds
- Penumbral: 314 minutes, 11 seconds
Contacts (UTC)
- P1: 16:33:07
- U1: 17:28:05
- U2: 18:28:26
- Greatest: 19:10:13
- U3: 19:52:00
- U4: 20:52:21
- P4: 21:47:18

A total lunar eclipse will occur at the Moon's descending node of orbit on Thursday, October 19, 2051, with an umbral magnitude of 1.4130. It will be a central lunar eclipse, in which part of the Moon will pass through the center of the Earth's shadow. A lunar eclipse occurs when the Moon moves into the Earth's shadow, causing the Moon to be darkened. A total lunar eclipse occurs when the Moon's near side entirely passes into the Earth's umbral shadow. Unlike a solar eclipse, which can only be viewed from a relatively small area of the world, a lunar eclipse may be viewed from anywhere on the night side of Earth. A total lunar eclipse can last up to nearly two hours, while a total solar eclipse lasts only a few minutes at any given place, because the Moon's shadow is smaller. Occurring only about 30 minutes after perigee (on October 19, 2051, at 18:40 UTC), the Moon's apparent diameter will be larger.

This lunar eclipse is the last of a tetrad, with four total lunar eclipses in series, the others being on May 6, 2050; October 30, 2050; and April 26, 2051.

This will be the first central eclipse of Saros series 137. Less than a day from perigee, the Moon's apparent diameter will be larger, and be considered a supermoon.

== Visibility ==
The eclipse will be completely visible over east Africa and much of Europe and Asia, seen rising over eastern South America and west Africa and setting over Australia and the western Pacific Ocean.

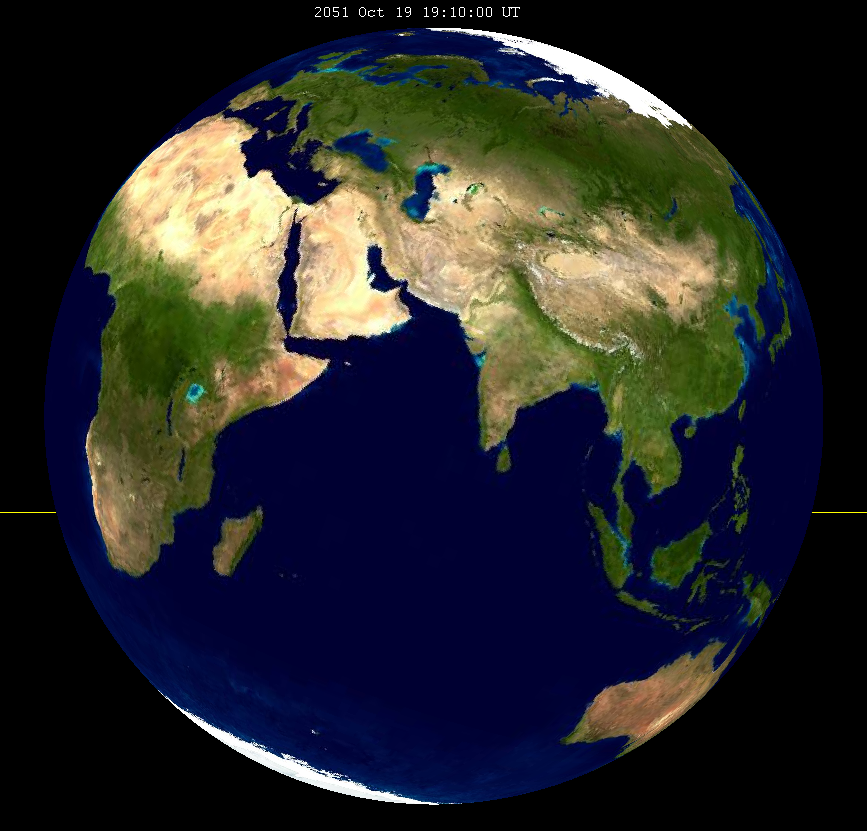
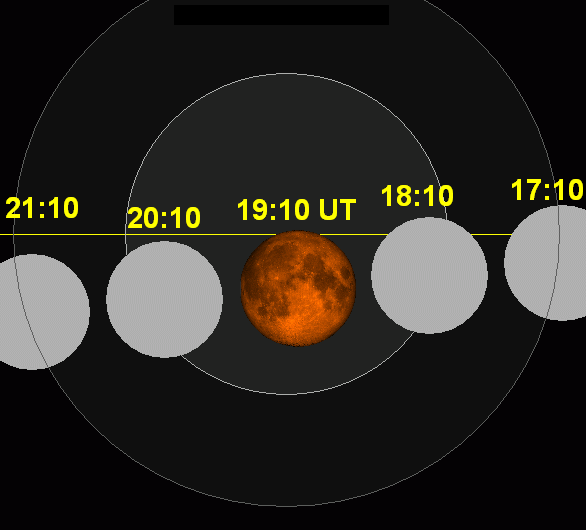

== Eclipse details ==
Shown below is a table displaying details about this particular solar eclipse. It describes various parameters pertaining to this eclipse.

October 19, 2051 Lunar Eclipse Parameters
Parameter	Value
Penumbral Magnitude	2.37193
Umbral Magnitude	1.41297
Gamma	−0.25423
Sun Right Ascension	13h37m47.1s
Sun Declination	-10°10'03.3"
Sun Semi-Diameter	16'03.4"
Sun Equatorial Horizontal Parallax	08.8"
Moon Right Ascension	01h38m04.1s
Moon Declination	+09°55'00.4"
Moon Semi-Diameter	16'44.6"
Moon Equatorial Horizontal Parallax	1°01'27.1"
ΔT	86.3 s

== Eclipse season ==
This eclipse is part of an eclipse season, a period, roughly every six months, when eclipses occur. Only two (or occasionally three) eclipse seasons occur each year, and each season lasts about 35 days and repeats just short of six months (173 days) later; thus two full eclipse seasons always occur each year. Either two or three eclipses happen each eclipse season. In the sequence below, each eclipse is separated by a fortnight.

Eclipse season of October 2051
October 4 Ascending node (new moon)	October 19 Descending node (full moon)
Partial solar eclipse Solar Saros 125	Total lunar eclipse Lunar Saros 137

== Related eclipses ==
=== Eclipses in 2051 ===
- A partial solar eclipse on April 11.
- A total lunar eclipse on April 26.
- A partial solar eclipse on October 4.
- A total lunar eclipse on October 19.

=== Metonic ===
- Preceded by: Lunar eclipse of January 1, 2048
- Followed by: Lunar eclipse of August 7, 2055

=== Tzolkinex ===
- Preceded by: Lunar eclipse of September 7, 2044
- Followed by: Lunar eclipse of November 30, 2058

=== Half-Saros ===
- Preceded by: Solar eclipse of October 14, 2042
- Followed by: Solar eclipse of October 24, 2060

=== Tritos ===
- Preceded by: Lunar eclipse of November 18, 2040
- Followed by: Lunar eclipse of September 18, 2062

=== Lunar Saros 137 ===
- Preceded by: Lunar eclipse of October 8, 2033
- Followed by: Lunar eclipse of October 30, 2069

=== Inex ===
- Preceded by: Lunar eclipse of November 8, 2022
- Followed by: Lunar eclipse of September 29, 2080

=== Triad ===
- Preceded by: Lunar eclipse of December 19, 1964
- Followed by: Lunar eclipse of August 20, 2138

=== Lunar eclipses of 2049–2052 ===
This eclipse is a member of a semester series. An eclipse in a semester series of lunar eclipses repeats approximately every 177 days and 4 hours (a semester) at alternating nodes of the Moon's orbit.

The penumbral lunar eclipse on June 15, 2049 occurs in the previous lunar year eclipse set.

Lunar eclipse series sets from 2049 to 2052
Ascending node				Descending node			
Saros	Date Viewing	Type Chart	Gamma	Saros	Date Viewing	Type Chart	Gamma
112	2049 May 17	Penumbral	−1.1337	117	2049 Nov 09	Penumbral	1.1964
122	2050 May 06	Total	−0.4181	127	2050 Oct 30	Total	0.4435
132	2051 Apr 26	Total	0.3371	137	2051 Oct 19	Total	−0.2542
142	2052 Apr 14	Penumbral	1.0628	147	2052 Oct 08	Partial	−0.9726

=== Saros 137 ===
This eclipse is a part of Saros series 137, repeating every 18 years, 11 days, and containing 78 events. The series started with a penumbral lunar eclipse on December 17, 1564. It contains partial eclipses from June 10, 1835 through August 26, 1961; total eclipses from September 6, 1979 through June 28, 2466; and a second set of partial eclipses from July 9, 2484 through September 12, 2592. The series ends at member 78 as a penumbral eclipse on April 20, 2953.

The longest duration of totality will be produced by member 44 at 99 minutes, 53 seconds on April 13, 2340. All eclipses in this series occur at the Moon’s descending node of orbit.

Greatest	First			
The greatest eclipse of the series will occur on 2340 Apr 13, lasting 99 minutes, 53 seconds.	Penumbral	Partial	Total	Central
The greatest eclipse of the series will occur on 2340 Apr 13, lasting 99 minutes, 53 seconds.	1564 Dec 17	1835 Jun 10	1979 Sep 06	2051 Oct 19
The greatest eclipse of the series will occur on 2340 Apr 13, lasting 99 minutes, 53 seconds.	Last			
The greatest eclipse of the series will occur on 2340 Apr 13, lasting 99 minutes, 53 seconds.	Central	Total	Partial	Penumbral
The greatest eclipse of the series will occur on 2340 Apr 13, lasting 99 minutes, 53 seconds.	2412 May 26	2466 Jun 28	2592 Sep 12	2953 Apr 20

Eclipses are tabulated in three columns; every third eclipse in the same column is one exeligmos apart, so they all cast shadows over approximately the same parts of the Earth.

Series members 15–36 occur between 1801 and 2200:
15	16	17
1817 May 30	1835 Jun 10	1853 Jun 21
18	19	20
1871 Jul 02	1889 Jul 12	1907 Jul 25
21	22	23
1925 Aug 04	1943 Aug 15	1961 Aug 26
24	25	26
1979 Sep 06	1997 Sep 16	2015 Sep 28
27	28	29
2033 Oct 08	2051 Oct 19	2069 Oct 30
30	31	32
2087 Nov 10	2105 Nov 21	2123 Dec 03
33	34	35
2141 Dec 13	2159 Dec 24	2178 Jan 04
36
2196 Jan 15

=== Tritos series ===
This eclipse is a part of a tritos cycle, repeating at alternating nodes every 135 synodic months (≈ 3986.63 days, or 11 years minus 1 month). Their appearance and longitude are irregular due to a lack of synchronization with the anomalistic month (period of perigee), but groupings of 3 tritos cycles (≈ 33 years minus 3 months) come close (≈ 434.044 anomalistic months), so eclipses are similar in these groupings.

Series members between 1801 and 2200
1811 Sep 02 (Saros 115)	1822 Aug 03 (Saros 116)	1833 Jul 02 (Saros 117)	1844 May 31 (Saros 118)	1855 May 02 (Saros 119)
1866 Mar 31 (Saros 120)	1877 Feb 27 (Saros 121)	1888 Jan 28 (Saros 122)	1898 Dec 27 (Saros 123)	1909 Nov 27 (Saros 124)
1920 Oct 27 (Saros 125)	1931 Sep 26 (Saros 126)	1942 Aug 26 (Saros 127)	1953 Jul 26 (Saros 128)	1964 Jun 25 (Saros 129)
1975 May 25 (Saros 130)	1986 Apr 24 (Saros 131)	1997 Mar 24 (Saros 132)	2008 Feb 21 (Saros 133)	2019 Jan 21 (Saros 134)
2029 Dec 20 (Saros 135)	2040 Nov 18 (Saros 136)	2051 Oct 19 (Saros 137)	2062 Sep 18 (Saros 138)	2073 Aug 17 (Saros 139)
2084 Jul 17 (Saros 140)	2095 Jun 17 (Saros 141)	2106 May 17 (Saros 142)	2117 Apr 16 (Saros 143)	2128 Mar 16 (Saros 144)
2139 Feb 13 (Saros 145)	2150 Jan 13 (Saros 146)	2160 Dec 13 (Saros 147)	2171 Nov 12 (Saros 148)	2182 Oct 11 (Saros 149)
2193 Sep 11 (Saros 150)

=== Inex series ===
This eclipse is a part of the long period inex cycle, repeating at alternating nodes, every 358 synodic months (≈ 10,571.95 days, or 29 years minus 20 days). Their appearance and longitude are irregular due to a lack of synchronization with the anomalistic month (period of perigee). However, groupings of 3 inex cycles (≈ 87 years minus 2 months) comes close (≈ 1,151.02 anomalistic months), so eclipses are similar in these groupings.

Series members between 1801 and 2200
1820 Mar 29 (Saros 129)	1849 Mar 09 (Saros 130)	1878 Feb 17 (Saros 131)
1907 Jan 29 (Saros 132)	1936 Jan 08 (Saros 133)	1964 Dec 19 (Saros 134)
1993 Nov 29 (Saros 135)	2022 Nov 08 (Saros 136)	2051 Oct 19 (Saros 137)
2080 Sep 29 (Saros 138)	2109 Sep 09 (Saros 139)	2138 Aug 20 (Saros 140)
2167 Aug 01 (Saros 141)	2196 Jul 10 (Saros 142)	

=== Half-Saros cycle ===
A lunar eclipse will be preceded and followed by solar eclipses by 9 years and 5.5 days (a half saros). This lunar eclipse is related to two total solar eclipses of Solar Saros 144.

October 14, 2042	October 24, 2060

== See also ==
- List of lunar eclipses and List of 21st-century lunar eclipses
