= August 1943 lunar eclipse =

Partial lunar eclipse August 15, 1943

- Partial eclipse
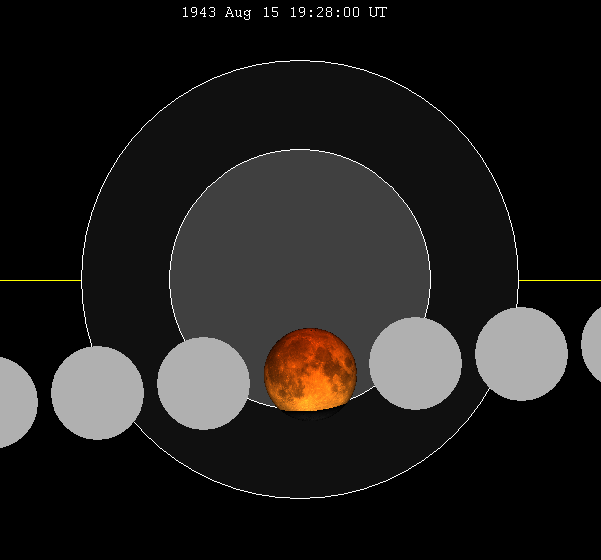
- The Moon's hourly motion shown right to left
- Date: August 15, 1943
- Gamma: −0.5534
- Magnitude: 0.8697
- Saros cycle: 137 (24 of 81)
- Partiality: 178 minutes, 23 seconds
- Penumbral: 296 minutes, 44 seconds
Contacts (UTC)
- P1: 16:59:57
- U1: 17:59:07
- Greatest: 19:28:19
- U4: 20:57:30
- P4: 21:56:41

A partial lunar eclipse occurred at the Moon's descending node of orbit on Sunday, August 15, 1943, with an umbral magnitude of 0.8697. A lunar eclipse occurs when the Moon moves into the Earth's shadow, causing the Moon to be darkened. A partial lunar eclipse occurs when one part of the Moon is in the Earth's umbra, while the other part is in the Earth's penumbra. Unlike a solar eclipse, which can only be viewed from a relatively small area of the world, a lunar eclipse may be viewed from anywhere on the night side of Earth. Occurring only about 10 hours after perigee (on August 15, 1943, at 9:25 UTC), the Moon's apparent diameter was larger.

== Visibility ==
The eclipse was completely visible over east Africa, much of Asia, western Australia, and Antarctica, seen rising over eastern South America, west Africa, and Europe and setting over northeast Asia and eastern Australia.

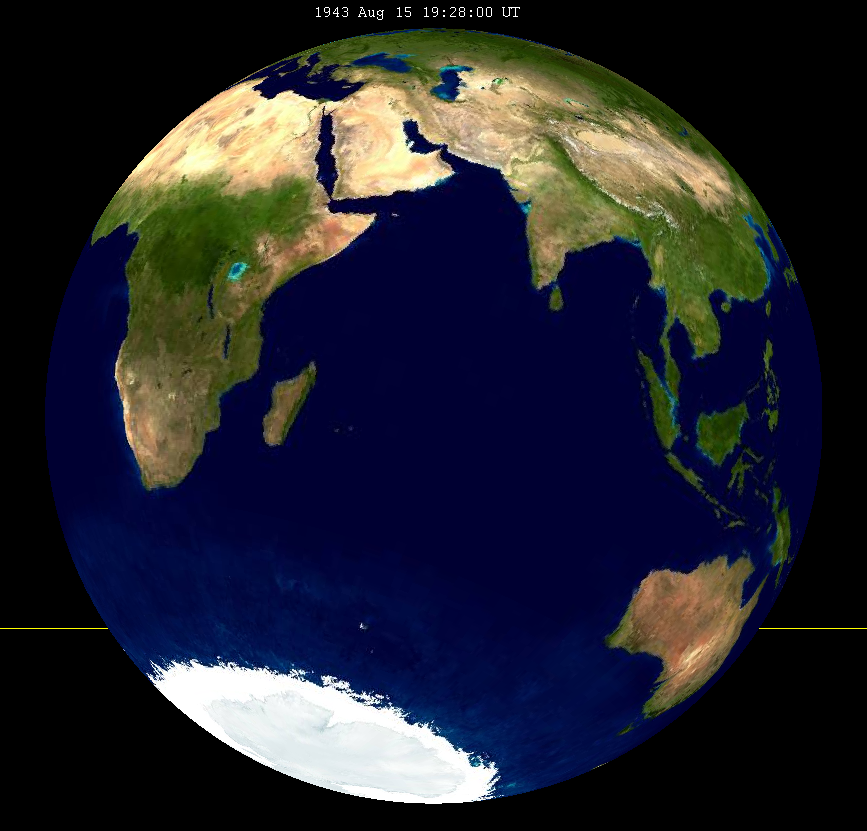
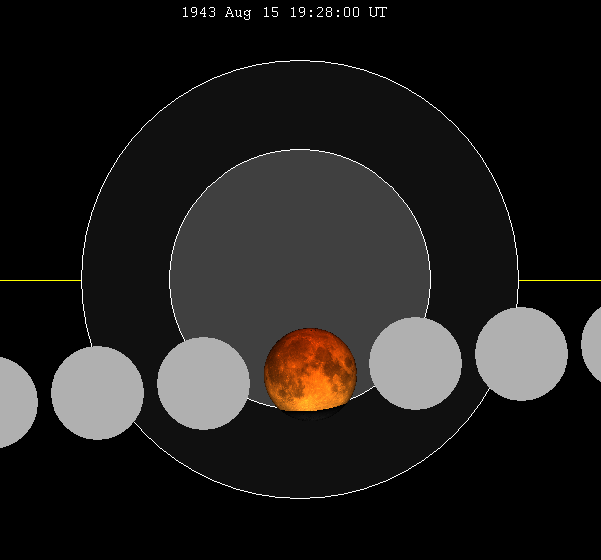

== Eclipse details ==
Shown below is a table displaying details about this particular solar eclipse. It describes various parameters pertaining to this eclipse.

August 15, 1943 Lunar Eclipse Parameters
Parameter	Value
Penumbral Magnitude	1.81515
Umbral Magnitude	0.86970
Gamma	−0.55335
Sun Right Ascension	09h37m47.7s
Sun Declination	+14°09'07.3"
Sun Semi-Diameter	15'47.7"
Sun Equatorial Horizontal Parallax	08.7"
Moon Right Ascension	21h38m19.9s
Moon Declination	-14°42'08.2"
Moon Semi-Diameter	16'42.3"
Moon Equatorial Horizontal Parallax	1°01'18.6"
ΔT	26.2 s

== Eclipse season ==
This eclipse is part of an eclipse season, a period, roughly every six months, when eclipses occur. Only two (or occasionally three) eclipse seasons occur each year, and each season lasts about 35 days and repeats just short of six months (173 days) later; thus two full eclipse seasons always occur each year. Either two or three eclipses happen each eclipse season. In the sequence below, each eclipse is separated by a fortnight.

Eclipse season of August 1943
August 1 Ascending node (new moon)	August 15 Descending node (full moon)
Annular solar eclipse Solar Saros 125	Partial lunar eclipse Lunar Saros 137

== Related eclipses ==
=== Eclipses in 1943 ===
- A total solar eclipse on February 4.
- A partial lunar eclipse on February 20.
- An annular solar eclipse on August 1.
- A partial lunar eclipse on August 15.

=== Metonic ===
- Preceded by: Lunar eclipse of October 28, 1939
- Followed by: Lunar eclipse of June 3, 1947

=== Tzolkinex ===
- Preceded by: Lunar eclipse of July 4, 1936
- Followed by: Lunar eclipse of September 26, 1950

=== Half-Saros ===
- Preceded by: Solar eclipse of August 10, 1934
- Followed by: Solar eclipse of August 20, 1952

=== Tritos ===
- Preceded by: Lunar eclipse of September 14, 1932
- Followed by: Lunar eclipse of July 16, 1954

=== Lunar Saros 137 ===
- Preceded by: Lunar eclipse of August 4, 1925
- Followed by: Lunar eclipse of August 26, 1961

=== Inex ===
- Preceded by: Lunar eclipse of September 4, 1914
- Followed by: Lunar eclipse of July 26, 1972

=== Triad ===
- Preceded by: Lunar eclipse of October 13, 1856
- Followed by: Lunar eclipse of June 15, 2030

=== Lunar eclipses of 1940–1944 ===
This eclipse is a member of a semester series. An eclipse in a semester series of lunar eclipses repeats approximately every 177 days and 4 hours (a semester) at alternating nodes of the Moon's orbit.

The penumbral lunar eclipses on April 22, 1940 and October 16, 1940 occur in the previous lunar year eclipse set, and the penumbral lunar eclipses on July 6, 1944 and December 29, 1944 occur in the next lunar year eclipse set.

Lunar eclipse series sets from 1940 to 1944
Ascending node				Descending node			
Saros	Date Viewing	Type Chart	Gamma	Saros	Date Viewing	Type Chart	Gamma
102	1940 Mar 23	Penumbral	−1.5034	107			
112	1941 Mar 13	Partial	−0.8437	117	1941 Sep 05	Partial	0.9747
122	1942 Mar 03	Total	−0.1545	127	1942 Aug 26	Total	0.1818
132	1943 Feb 20	Partial	0.5752	137	1943 Aug 15	Partial	−0.5534
142	1944 Feb 09	Penumbral	1.2698	147	1944 Aug 04	Penumbral	−1.2843

=== Saros 137 ===
This eclipse is a part of Saros series 137, repeating every 18 years, 11 days, and containing 78 events. The series started with a penumbral lunar eclipse on December 17, 1564. It contains partial eclipses from June 10, 1835 through August 26, 1961; total eclipses from September 6, 1979 through June 28, 2466; and a second set of partial eclipses from July 9, 2484 through September 12, 2592. The series ends at member 78 as a penumbral eclipse on April 20, 2953.

The longest duration of totality will be produced by member 44 at 99 minutes, 53 seconds on April 13, 2340. All eclipses in this series occur at the Moon’s descending node of orbit.

Greatest	First			
The greatest eclipse of the series will occur on 2340 Apr 13, lasting 99 minutes, 53 seconds.	Penumbral	Partial	Total	Central
The greatest eclipse of the series will occur on 2340 Apr 13, lasting 99 minutes, 53 seconds.	1564 Dec 17	1835 Jun 10	1979 Sep 06	2051 Oct 19
The greatest eclipse of the series will occur on 2340 Apr 13, lasting 99 minutes, 53 seconds.	Last			
The greatest eclipse of the series will occur on 2340 Apr 13, lasting 99 minutes, 53 seconds.	Central	Total	Partial	Penumbral
The greatest eclipse of the series will occur on 2340 Apr 13, lasting 99 minutes, 53 seconds.	2412 May 26	2466 Jun 28	2592 Sep 12	2953 Apr 20

Eclipses are tabulated in three columns; every third eclipse in the same column is one exeligmos apart, so they all cast shadows over approximately the same parts of the Earth.

Series members 15–36 occur between 1801 and 2200:
15	16	17
1817 May 30	1835 Jun 10	1853 Jun 21
18	19	20
1871 Jul 02	1889 Jul 12	1907 Jul 25
21	22	23
1925 Aug 04	1943 Aug 15	1961 Aug 26
24	25	26
1979 Sep 06	1997 Sep 16	2015 Sep 28
27	28	29
2033 Oct 08	2051 Oct 19	2069 Oct 30
30	31	32
2087 Nov 10	2105 Nov 21	2123 Dec 03
33	34	35
2141 Dec 13	2159 Dec 24	2178 Jan 04
36
2196 Jan 15

=== Tritos series ===
This eclipse is a part of a tritos cycle, repeating at alternating nodes every 135 synodic months (≈ 3986.63 days, or 11 years minus 1 month). Their appearance and longitude are irregular due to a lack of synchronization with the anomalistic month (period of perigee), but groupings of 3 tritos cycles (≈ 33 years minus 3 months) come close (≈ 434.044 anomalistic months), so eclipses are similar in these groupings.

Series members between 1801 and 2183
1801 Sep 22 (Saros 124)	1812 Aug 22 (Saros 125)	1823 Jul 23 (Saros 126)	1834 Jun 21 (Saros 127)	1845 May 21 (Saros 128)
1856 Apr 20 (Saros 129)	1867 Mar 20 (Saros 130)	1878 Feb 17 (Saros 131)	1889 Jan 17 (Saros 132)	1899 Dec 17 (Saros 133)
1910 Nov 17 (Saros 134)	1921 Oct 16 (Saros 135)	1932 Sep 14 (Saros 136)	1943 Aug 15 (Saros 137)	1954 Jul 16 (Saros 138)
1965 Jun 14 (Saros 139)	1976 May 13 (Saros 140)	1987 Apr 14 (Saros 141)	1998 Mar 13 (Saros 142)	2009 Feb 09 (Saros 143)
2020 Jan 10 (Saros 144)	2030 Dec 09 (Saros 145)	2041 Nov 08 (Saros 146)	2052 Oct 08 (Saros 147)	2063 Sep 07 (Saros 148)
2074 Aug 07 (Saros 149)	2085 Jul 07 (Saros 150)	2096 Jun 06 (Saros 151)	2107 May 07 (Saros 152)	
		2151 Jan 02 (Saros 156)		2172 Oct 31 (Saros 158)
2183 Oct 01 (Saros 159)

=== Inex series ===
This eclipse is a part of the long period inex cycle, repeating at alternating nodes, every 358 synodic months (≈ 10,571.95 days, or 29 years minus 20 days). Their appearance and longitude are irregular due to a lack of synchronization with the anomalistic month (period of perigee). However, groupings of 3 inex cycles (≈ 87 years minus 2 months) comes close (≈ 1,151.02 anomalistic months), so eclipses are similar in these groupings.

Series members between 1801 and 2200
1827 Nov 03 (Saros 133)	1856 Oct 13 (Saros 134)	1885 Sep 24 (Saros 135)
1914 Sep 04 (Saros 136)	1943 Aug 15 (Saros 137)	1972 Jul 26 (Saros 138)
2001 Jul 05 (Saros 139)	2030 Jun 15 (Saros 140)	2059 May 27 (Saros 141)
2088 May 05 (Saros 142)	2117 Apr 16 (Saros 143)	2146 Mar 28 (Saros 144)
2175 Mar 07 (Saros 145)

=== Half-Saros cycle ===
A lunar eclipse will be preceded and followed by solar eclipses by 9 years and 5.5 days (a half saros). This lunar eclipse is related to two total solar eclipses of Solar Saros 144.

August 10, 1934	August 20, 1952

== See also ==
- List of lunar eclipses and List of 21st-century lunar eclipses
