= October 2033 lunar eclipse =

Astronomical event

- Total eclipse
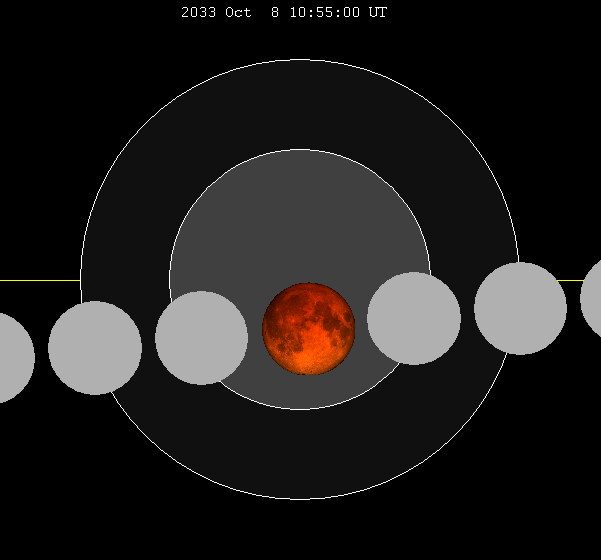
- The Moon's hourly motion shown right to left
- Date: October 8, 2033
- Gamma: −0.2889
- Magnitude: 1.3508
- Saros cycle: 137 (29 of 81)
- Totality: 78 minutes, 48 seconds
- Partiality: 202 minutes, 24 seconds
- Penumbral: 312 minutes, 39 seconds
Contacts (UTC)
- P1: 8:20:05
- U1: 9:15:11
- U2: 10:16:59
- Greatest: 10:56:23
- U3: 11:35:47
- U4: 12:37:35
- P4: 13:32:41

A total lunar eclipse will occur at the Moon's descending node of orbit on Saturday, October 8, 2033, with an umbral magnitude of 1.3508. A lunar eclipse occurs when the Moon moves into the Earth's shadow, causing the Moon to be darkened. A total lunar eclipse occurs when the Moon's near side entirely passes into the Earth's umbral shadow. Unlike a solar eclipse, which can only be viewed from a relatively small area of the world, a lunar eclipse may be viewed from anywhere on the night side of Earth. A total lunar eclipse can last up to nearly two hours, while a total solar eclipse lasts only a few minutes at any given place, because the Moon's shadow is smaller. Occurring only about 3 hours after perigee (on October 8, 2033, at 8:15 UTC), the Moon's apparent diameter will be larger.

This lunar eclipse is the last of a tetrad, with four total lunar eclipses in series, the others being on April 25, 2032; October 18, 2032; and April 14, 2033.

This will also be a supermoon, the first supermoon lunar eclipse since May 16 in 2022.

== Visibility ==
The eclipse will be completely visible over northeast Asia, eastern Australia, western North America and the Pacific Ocean, seen rising over most of Asia and western Australia and setting over eastern North America and South America.

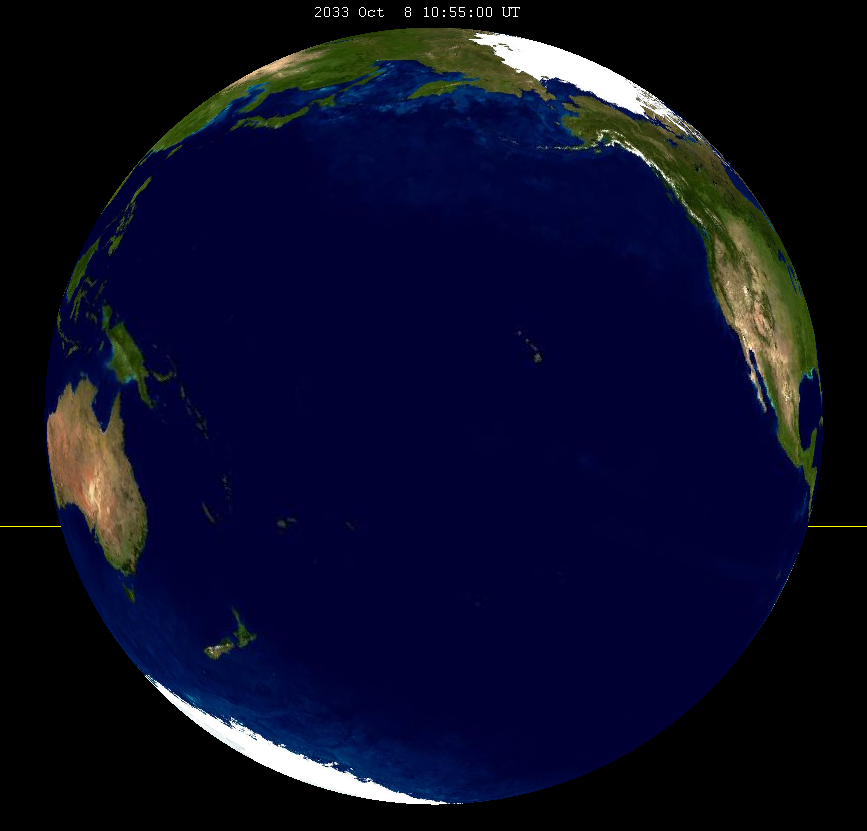
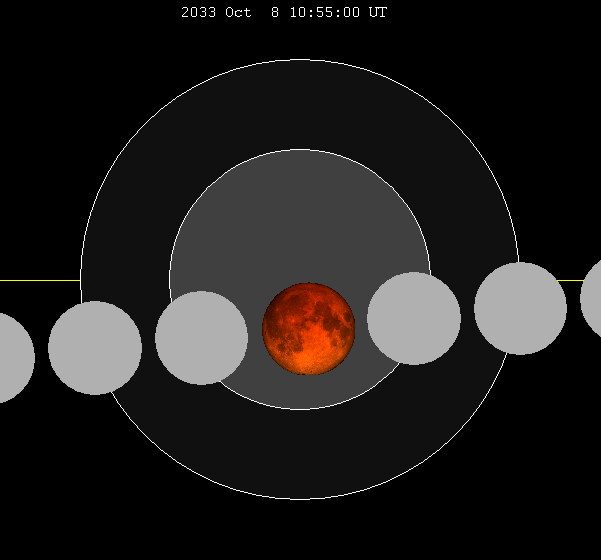

== Eclipse details ==
Shown below is a table displaying details about this particular solar eclipse. It describes various parameters pertaining to this eclipse.

October 8, 2033 Lunar Eclipse Parameters
Parameter	Value
Penumbral Magnitude	2.30682
Umbral Magnitude	1.35080
Gamma	−0.28888
Sun Right Ascension	12h57m01.9s
Sun Declination	-06°05'34.4"
Sun Semi-Diameter	16'00.5"
Sun Equatorial Horizontal Parallax	08.8"
Moon Right Ascension	00h57m22.8s
Moon Declination	+05°48'36.0"
Moon Semi-Diameter	16'44.6"
Moon Equatorial Horizontal Parallax	1°01'27.1"
ΔT	75.8 s

== Eclipse season ==
This eclipse is part of an eclipse season, a period, roughly every six months, when eclipses occur. Only two (or occasionally three) eclipse seasons occur each year, and each season lasts about 35 days and repeats just short of six months (173 days) later; thus two full eclipse seasons always occur each year. Either two or three eclipses happen each eclipse season. In the sequence below, each eclipse is separated by a fortnight.

Eclipse season of September–October 2033
September 23 Ascending node (new moon)	October 8 Descending node (full moon)
Partial solar eclipse Solar Saros 125	Total lunar eclipse Lunar Saros 137

== Related eclipses ==
=== Eclipses in 2033 ===
- A total solar eclipse on March 30.
- A total lunar eclipse on April 14.
- A partial solar eclipse on September 23.
- A total lunar eclipse on October 8.

=== Metonic ===
- Preceded by: Lunar eclipse of December 20, 2029
- Followed by: Lunar eclipse of July 27, 2037

=== Tzolkinex ===
- Preceded by: Lunar eclipse of August 28, 2026
- Followed by: Lunar eclipse of November 18, 2040

=== Half-Saros ===
- Preceded by: Solar eclipse of October 2, 2024
- Followed by: Solar eclipse of October 14, 2042

=== Tritos ===
- Preceded by: Lunar eclipse of November 8, 2022
- Followed by: Lunar eclipse of September 7, 2044

=== Lunar Saros 137 ===
- Preceded by: Lunar eclipse of September 28, 2015
- Followed by: Lunar eclipse of October 19, 2051

=== Inex ===
- Preceded by: Lunar eclipse of October 28, 2004
- Followed by: Lunar eclipse of September 18, 2062

=== Triad ===
- Preceded by: Lunar eclipse of December 8, 1946
- Followed by: Lunar eclipse of August 9, 2120

=== Lunar eclipses of 2031–2034 ===
This eclipse is a member of a semester series. An eclipse in a semester series of lunar eclipses repeats approximately every 177 days and 4 hours (a semester) at alternating nodes of the Moon's orbit.

The penumbral lunar eclipse on June 5, 2031 occurs in the previous lunar year eclipse set.

Lunar eclipse series sets from 2031 to 2034
Ascending node				Descending node			
Saros	Date Viewing	Type Chart	Gamma	Saros	Date Viewing	Type Chart	Gamma
112	2031 May 07	Penumbral	−1.0694	117	2031 Oct 30	Penumbral	1.1774
122	2032 Apr 25	Total	−0.3558	127	2032 Oct 18	Total	0.4169
132	2033 Apr 14	Total	0.3954	137	2033 Oct 08	Total	−0.2889
142	2034 Apr 03	Penumbral	1.1144	147	2034 Sep 28	Partial	−1.0110

=== Saros 137 ===
This eclipse is a part of Saros series 137, repeating every 18 years, 11 days, and containing 78 events. The series started with a penumbral lunar eclipse on December 17, 1564. It contains partial eclipses from June 10, 1835 through August 26, 1961; total eclipses from September 6, 1979 through June 28, 2466; and a second set of partial eclipses from July 9, 2484 through September 12, 2592. The series ends at member 78 as a penumbral eclipse on April 20, 2953.

The longest duration of totality will be produced by member 44 at 99 minutes, 53 seconds on April 13, 2340. All eclipses in this series occur at the Moon’s descending node of orbit.

Greatest	First			
The greatest eclipse of the series will occur on 2340 Apr 13, lasting 99 minutes, 53 seconds.	Penumbral	Partial	Total	Central
The greatest eclipse of the series will occur on 2340 Apr 13, lasting 99 minutes, 53 seconds.	1564 Dec 17	1835 Jun 10	1979 Sep 06	2051 Oct 19
The greatest eclipse of the series will occur on 2340 Apr 13, lasting 99 minutes, 53 seconds.	Last			
The greatest eclipse of the series will occur on 2340 Apr 13, lasting 99 minutes, 53 seconds.	Central	Total	Partial	Penumbral
The greatest eclipse of the series will occur on 2340 Apr 13, lasting 99 minutes, 53 seconds.	2412 May 26	2466 Jun 28	2592 Sep 12	2953 Apr 20

Eclipses are tabulated in three columns; every third eclipse in the same column is one exeligmos apart, so they all cast shadows over approximately the same parts of the Earth.

Series members 15–36 occur between 1801 and 2200:
15	16	17
1817 May 30	1835 Jun 10	1853 Jun 21
18	19	20
1871 Jul 02	1889 Jul 12	1907 Jul 25
21	22	23
1925 Aug 04	1943 Aug 15	1961 Aug 26
24	25	26
1979 Sep 06	1997 Sep 16	2015 Sep 28
27	28	29
2033 Oct 08	2051 Oct 19	2069 Oct 30
30	31	32
2087 Nov 10	2105 Nov 21	2123 Dec 03
33	34	35
2141 Dec 13	2159 Dec 24	2178 Jan 04
36
2196 Jan 15

=== Tritos series ===
This eclipse is a part of a tritos cycle, repeating at alternating nodes every 135 synodic months (≈ 3986.63 days, or 11 years minus 1 month). Their appearance and longitude are irregular due to a lack of synchronization with the anomalistic month (period of perigee), but groupings of 3 tritos cycles (≈ 33 years minus 3 months) come close (≈ 434.044 anomalistic months), so eclipses are similar in these groupings.

Series members between 1801 and 2200
1804 Jul 22 (Saros 116)	1815 Jun 21 (Saros 117)	1826 May 21 (Saros 118)	1837 Apr 20 (Saros 119)	1848 Mar 19 (Saros 120)
1859 Feb 17 (Saros 121)	1870 Jan 17 (Saros 122)	1880 Dec 16 (Saros 123)	1891 Nov 16 (Saros 124)	1902 Oct 17 (Saros 125)
1913 Sep 15 (Saros 126)	1924 Aug 14 (Saros 127)	1935 Jul 16 (Saros 128)	1946 Jun 14 (Saros 129)	1957 May 13 (Saros 130)
1968 Apr 13 (Saros 131)	1979 Mar 13 (Saros 132)	1990 Feb 09 (Saros 133)	2001 Jan 09 (Saros 134)	2011 Dec 10 (Saros 135)
2022 Nov 08 (Saros 136)	2033 Oct 08 (Saros 137)	2044 Sep 07 (Saros 138)	2055 Aug 07 (Saros 139)	2066 Jul 07 (Saros 140)
2077 Jun 06 (Saros 141)	2088 May 05 (Saros 142)	2099 Apr 05 (Saros 143)	2110 Mar 06 (Saros 144)	2121 Feb 02 (Saros 145)
2132 Jan 02 (Saros 146)	2142 Dec 03 (Saros 147)	2153 Nov 01 (Saros 148)	2164 Sep 30 (Saros 149)	2175 Aug 31 (Saros 150)
2186 Jul 31 (Saros 151)	2197 Jun 29 (Saros 152)			

=== Inex series ===
This eclipse is a part of the long period inex cycle, repeating at alternating nodes, every 358 synodic months (≈ 10,571.95 days, or 29 years minus 20 days). Their appearance and longitude are irregular due to a lack of synchronization with the anomalistic month (period of perigee). However, groupings of 3 inex cycles (≈ 87 years minus 2 months) comes close (≈ 1,151.02 anomalistic months), so eclipses are similar in these groupings.

Series members between 1801 and 2200
1802 Mar 19 (Saros 129)	1831 Feb 26 (Saros 130)	1860 Feb 07 (Saros 131)
1889 Jan 17 (Saros 132)	1917 Dec 28 (Saros 133)	1946 Dec 08 (Saros 134)
1975 Nov 18 (Saros 135)	2004 Oct 28 (Saros 136)	2033 Oct 08 (Saros 137)
2062 Sep 18 (Saros 138)	2091 Aug 29 (Saros 139)	2120 Aug 09 (Saros 140)
2149 Jul 20 (Saros 141)	2178 Jun 30 (Saros 142)	

=== Half-Saros cycle ===
A lunar eclipse will be preceded and followed by solar eclipses by 9 years and 5.5 days (a half saros). This lunar eclipse is related to two total solar eclipses of Solar Saros 144.

October 2, 2024	October 14, 2042

== See also ==
- List of lunar eclipses and List of 21st-century lunar eclipses
