= August 1961 lunar eclipse =

Partial lunar eclipse August 26, 1961

- Partial eclipse
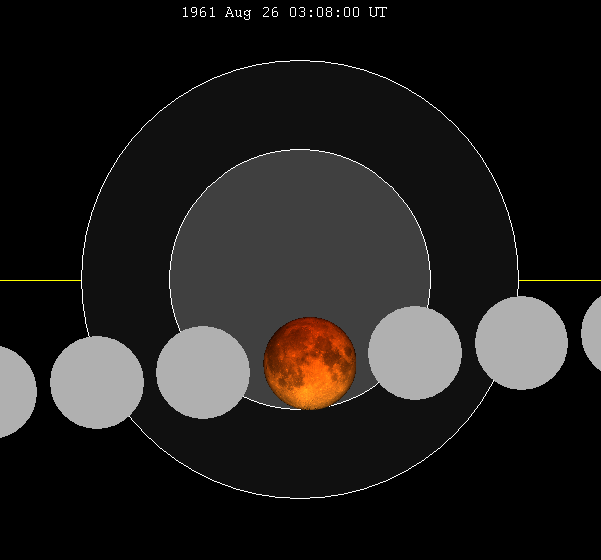
- The Moon's hourly motion shown right to left
- Date: August 26, 1961
- Gamma: −0.4895
- Magnitude: 0.9863
- Saros cycle: 137 (25 of 81)
- Partiality: 185 minutes, 58 seconds
- Penumbral: 301 minutes, 22 seconds
Contacts (UTC)
- P1: 0:37:36
- U1: 1:35:18
- Greatest: 3:08:17
- U4: 4:41:16
- P4: 5:38:58

A partial lunar eclipse occurred at the Moon’s descending node of orbit on Saturday, August 26, 1961, with an umbral magnitude of 0.9863. A lunar eclipse occurs when the Moon moves into the Earth's shadow, causing the Moon to be darkened. A partial lunar eclipse occurs when one part of the Moon is in the Earth's umbra, while the other part is in the Earth's penumbra. Unlike a solar eclipse, which can only be viewed from a relatively small area of the world, a lunar eclipse may be viewed from anywhere on the night side of Earth. Occurring only about 7.5 hours after perigee (on August 25, 1961, at 19:40 UTC), the Moon's apparent diameter was larger.

This nearly total lunar eclipse of Lunar Saros 137 preceded the first total eclipse on September 6, 1979. It was also the largest partial lunar eclipse since October 28, 1939, making it the second largest partial lunar eclipse of the 20th century.

== Visibility ==
The eclipse was completely visible over eastern North America, South America, west Africa, western Europe, and Antarctica, seen rising over western and central North America and the eastern Pacific Ocean and setting over much of Europe, central and east Africa, and west and central Asia.

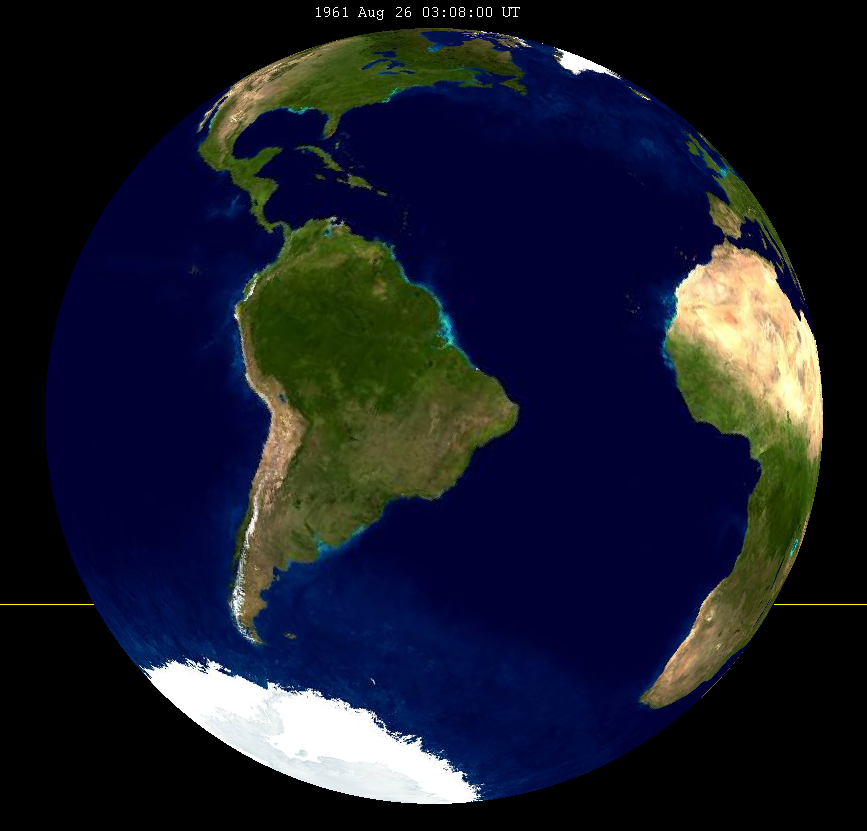
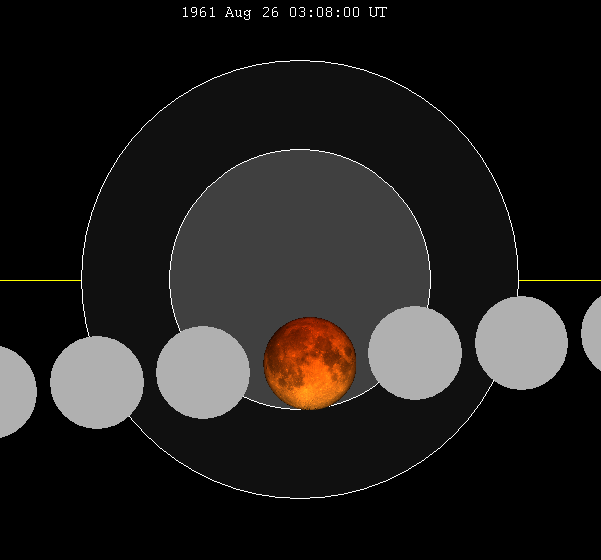

== Eclipse details ==
Shown below is a table displaying details about this particular solar eclipse. It describes various parameters pertaining to this eclipse.

August 26, 1961 Lunar Eclipse Parameters
Parameter	Value
Penumbral Magnitude	1.93301
Umbral Magnitude	0.98626
Gamma	−0.48947
Sun Right Ascension	10h18m26.0s
Sun Declination	+10°31'58.9"
Sun Semi-Diameter	15'49.7"
Sun Equatorial Horizontal Parallax	08.7"
Moon Right Ascension	22h18m58.5s
Moon Declination	-11°00'55.6"
Moon Semi-Diameter	16'43.1"
Moon Equatorial Horizontal Parallax	1°01'21.5"
ΔT	33.8 s

== Eclipse season ==
This eclipse is part of an eclipse season, a period, roughly every six months, when eclipses occur. Only two (or occasionally three) eclipse seasons occur each year, and each season lasts about 35 days and repeats just short of six months (173 days) later; thus two full eclipse seasons always occur each year. Either two or three eclipses happen each eclipse season. In the sequence below, each eclipse is separated by a fortnight.

Eclipse season of August 1961
August 11 Ascending node (new moon)	August 26 Descending node (full moon)
Annular solar eclipse Solar Saros 125	Partial lunar eclipse Lunar Saros 137

== Related eclipses ==
=== Eclipses in 1961 ===
- A total solar eclipse on February 15.
- A partial lunar eclipse on March 2.
- An annular solar eclipse on August 11.
- A partial lunar eclipse on August 26.

=== Metonic ===
- Preceded by: Lunar eclipse of November 7, 1957
- Followed by: Lunar eclipse of June 14, 1965

=== Tzolkinex ===
- Preceded by: Lunar eclipse of July 16, 1954
- Followed by: Lunar eclipse of October 6, 1968

=== Half-Saros ===
- Preceded by: Solar eclipse of August 20, 1952
- Followed by: Solar eclipse of August 31, 1970

=== Tritos ===
- Preceded by: Lunar eclipse of September 26, 1950
- Followed by: Lunar eclipse of July 26, 1972

=== Lunar Saros 137 ===
- Preceded by: Lunar eclipse of August 15, 1943
- Followed by: Lunar eclipse of September 6, 1979

=== Inex ===
- Preceded by: Lunar eclipse of September 14, 1932
- Followed by: Lunar eclipse of August 6, 1990

=== Triad ===
- Preceded by: Lunar eclipse of October 25, 1874
- Followed by: Lunar eclipse of June 26, 2048

=== Lunar eclipses of 1958–1962 ===
This eclipse is a member of a semester series. An eclipse in a semester series of lunar eclipses repeats approximately every 177 days and 4 hours (a semester) at alternating nodes of the Moon's orbit.

The lunar eclipses on May 3, 1958 (partial) and October 28, 1958 (penumbral) occur in the previous lunar year eclipse set, and the penumbral lunar eclipse on July 17, 1962 occurs in the next lunar year eclipse set.

Lunar eclipse series sets from 1958 to 1962
Ascending node				Descending node			
Saros	Date Viewing	Type Chart	Gamma	Saros	Date Viewing	Type Chart	Gamma
102	1958 Apr 04	Penumbral	−1.5381				
112	1959 Mar 24	Partial	−0.8757	117	1959 Sep 17	Penumbral	1.0296
122	1960 Mar 13	Total	−0.1799	127	1960 Sep 05	Total	0.2422
132	1961 Mar 02	Partial	0.5541	137	1961 Aug 26	Partial	−0.4895
142	1962 Feb 19	Penumbral	1.2512	147	1962 Aug 15	Penumbral	−1.2210

=== Saros 137 ===
This eclipse is a part of Saros series 137, repeating every 18 years, 11 days, and containing 78 events. The series started with a penumbral lunar eclipse on December 17, 1564. It contains partial eclipses from June 10, 1835 through August 26, 1961; total eclipses from September 6, 1979 through June 28, 2466; and a second set of partial eclipses from July 9, 2484 through September 12, 2592. The series ends at member 78 as a penumbral eclipse on April 20, 2953.

The longest duration of totality will be produced by member 44 at 99 minutes, 53 seconds on April 13, 2340. All eclipses in this series occur at the Moon’s descending node of orbit.

Greatest	First			
The greatest eclipse of the series will occur on 2340 Apr 13, lasting 99 minutes, 53 seconds.	Penumbral	Partial	Total	Central
The greatest eclipse of the series will occur on 2340 Apr 13, lasting 99 minutes, 53 seconds.	1564 Dec 17	1835 Jun 10	1979 Sep 06	2051 Oct 19
The greatest eclipse of the series will occur on 2340 Apr 13, lasting 99 minutes, 53 seconds.	Last			
The greatest eclipse of the series will occur on 2340 Apr 13, lasting 99 minutes, 53 seconds.	Central	Total	Partial	Penumbral
The greatest eclipse of the series will occur on 2340 Apr 13, lasting 99 minutes, 53 seconds.	2412 May 26	2466 Jun 28	2592 Sep 12	2953 Apr 20

Eclipses are tabulated in three columns; every third eclipse in the same column is one exeligmos apart, so they all cast shadows over approximately the same parts of the Earth.

Series members 15–36 occur between 1801 and 2200:
15	16	17
1817 May 30	1835 Jun 10	1853 Jun 21
18	19	20
1871 Jul 02	1889 Jul 12	1907 Jul 25
21	22	23
1925 Aug 04	1943 Aug 15	1961 Aug 26
24	25	26
1979 Sep 06	1997 Sep 16	2015 Sep 28
27	28	29
2033 Oct 08	2051 Oct 19	2069 Oct 30
30	31	32
2087 Nov 10	2105 Nov 21	2123 Dec 03
33	34	35
2141 Dec 13	2159 Dec 24	2178 Jan 04
36
2196 Jan 15

=== Tritos series ===
This eclipse is a part of a tritos cycle, repeating at alternating nodes every 135 synodic months (≈ 3986.63 days, or 11 years minus 1 month). Their appearance and longitude are irregular due to a lack of synchronization with the anomalistic month (period of perigee), but groupings of 3 tritos cycles (≈ 33 years minus 3 months) come close (≈ 434.044 anomalistic months), so eclipses are similar in these groupings.

Series members between 1801 and 2200
1808 Nov 03 (Saros 123)	1819 Oct 03 (Saros 124)	1830 Sep 02 (Saros 125)	1841 Aug 02 (Saros 126)	1852 Jul 01 (Saros 127)
1863 Jun 01 (Saros 128)	1874 May 01 (Saros 129)	1885 Mar 30 (Saros 130)	1896 Feb 28 (Saros 131)	1907 Jan 29 (Saros 132)
1917 Dec 28 (Saros 133)	1928 Nov 27 (Saros 134)	1939 Oct 28 (Saros 135)	1950 Sep 26 (Saros 136)	1961 Aug 26 (Saros 137)
1972 Jul 26 (Saros 138)	1983 Jun 25 (Saros 139)	1994 May 25 (Saros 140)	2005 Apr 24 (Saros 141)	2016 Mar 23 (Saros 142)
2027 Feb 20 (Saros 143)	2038 Jan 21 (Saros 144)	2048 Dec 20 (Saros 145)	2059 Nov 19 (Saros 146)	2070 Oct 19 (Saros 147)
2081 Sep 18 (Saros 148)	2092 Aug 17 (Saros 149)	2103 Jul 19 (Saros 150)	2114 Jun 18 (Saros 151)	2125 May 17 (Saros 152)
2136 Apr 16 (Saros 153)			2169 Jan 13 (Saros 156)	
2190 Nov 12 (Saros 158)

=== Inex series ===
This eclipse is a part of the long period inex cycle, repeating at alternating nodes, every 358 synodic months (≈ 10,571.95 days, or 29 years minus 20 days). Their appearance and longitude are irregular due to a lack of synchronization with the anomalistic month (period of perigee). However, groupings of 3 inex cycles (≈ 87 years minus 2 months) comes close (≈ 1,151.02 anomalistic months), so eclipses are similar in these groupings.

Series members between 1801 and 2200
1816 Dec 04 (Saros 132)	1845 Nov 14 (Saros 133)	1874 Oct 25 (Saros 134)
1903 Oct 06 (Saros 135)	1932 Sep 14 (Saros 136)	1961 Aug 26 (Saros 137)
1990 Aug 06 (Saros 138)	2019 Jul 16 (Saros 139)	2048 Jun 26 (Saros 140)
2077 Jun 06 (Saros 141)	2106 May 17 (Saros 142)	2135 Apr 28 (Saros 143)
2164 Apr 07 (Saros 144)	2193 Mar 17 (Saros 145)	

=== Half-Saros cycle ===
A lunar eclipse will be preceded and followed by solar eclipses by 9 years and 5.5 days (a half saros). This lunar eclipse is related to two total solar eclipses of Solar Saros 144.

August 20, 1952	August 31, 1970

== See also ==
- List of lunar eclipses
- List of 20th-century lunar eclipses
